= List of Deportivo Saprissa players =

This is a list of notable footballers who have played for Deportivo Saprissa, a football club in Costa Rica. Generally, this refers to players who are considered to have made significant contributions to the club's history and includes players with Wikipedia articles as well as those without articles.

Players are listed by those decades during which they were at the club. Note that some players' Saprissa careers spanned more than one decade, hence their names are repeated accordingly.

== Notable players ==
Note: The Players marked '(c)' have also coached the team

=== 1950s ===
- Sean Sanabria
- Rodolfo Sanabria
- Carlos Lopez
- Greivin Zumbado
- Rigoberto Rojas (Feo) (c)
- Jorge Hernan Monge (Cuty)
- Marvin Rodríguez (c)
- Mario Pérez (Flaco)
- Guillermo Hernández (Coco) (c)
- Constantino Quirós
- Jose Soto
- Ulises Aguero
- Carlos Vivó Gobán
- Giovanny Rodríguez (c)
- Rodolfo Herrera
- Alex Sánchez
- Rubén Jiménez (Rata)
- Álvaro Murillo
- Mario Cordero

=== 1960s ===
- Mario Cordero (Catato) (c)
- Marvin Rodríguez (c)
- Mario Pérez (Flaco)
- Rigoberto Rojas (Feo) (c)
- Jorge Hernan Monge (Cuty)
- Rodolfo Umaña
- Eduardo Umaña (Mudo)
- Hernan Carboni
- Guillermo Hernández (Coco) (c)
- Giovanny Rodríguez (c)
- Álvaro Murillo
- Miguel Cortes
- Victor Manuel Ruiz
- Edgar Marín
- Fernando Hernández (Principe)
- Wálter Elizondo
- Eduardo Chavarria (Lalo)
- Jaime Grant (Jimmy)

=== 1970s ===
- Edgar Marín
- Fernando Hernández (Principe)
- Carlos Solano
- Marco Antonio Rojas
- Wilberth Barquero
- Juan Gutiérrez
- Carlos Santana (c)
- Francisco Hernández
- Heriberto Rojas
- Javier Masís (Michelin)
- Fernando Solano
- Hernán Morales
- Gerardo Ureña (Puro)
- Jose Manuel Rojas (Chinimba)
- Odir Jaques (c)
- Asdrubal Paniagua (Yuba)
- Gerardo Solano

=== 1980s ===
- Evaristo Coronado (c)
- Hernán Medford (Pelicano) (c)
- Alexandre Guimarães (Guima) (c)
- Benjamín Mayorga (Indio)
- Enrique Díaz (Zancudo)
- Alexánder Sáenz
- Luis Fernández
- Rodrigo Kenton
- Alexis Camacho
- Juan Arnoldo Cayasso
- Marco Antonio Rojas
- Rónald Mora (Macho)
- Roger Flores (Capitano)
- Enrique Rivers (c)
- Guillermo Guardia
- Carlos Mario Hidalgo
- Vladimir Quesada (c)
- Freddy Méndez
- Tomás Segura
- Miguel Segura
- Jorge Jiménez
- José Jaikel
- Carlos Vivó Quirós
- Rolando Villalobos (Cadaver) (c)
- Gerardo Ureña (Puro)

=== 1990s ===
- Evaristo Coronado (c)
- Hernán Medford (Pelicano) (c)
- Alexandre Guimarães (Guima) (c)
- Benjamín Mayorga (Indio)
- Enrique Díaz (Zancudo)
- Juan Arnoldo Cayasso
- Marvin Obando
- Victor Badilla
- Roger Flores (Capitano)
- Edwin Salazar (Sarapiqui)
- Giancarlo Morera
- Erick Lonnis (Capi)
- Max Sánchez
- Jervis Drummond
- Hermidio Barrantes
- Juan Carlos Arguedas
- Rolando Fonseca
- Ronald González (c)
- Mauricio Wright
- Randall Row
- Roy Myers (Maravilloso) (c)
- Gerald Drummond
- Víctor Cordero
- Jeaustin Campos (c)
- Steven Bryce
- Javier Wanchope
- Oscar Ramírez (Machillo)
- Vladimir Quesada (c)
- Adrián Mahía
- Adonis Hilario
- Alejandro Larrea

=== 2000s to date ===
- Álvaro Saborío (Sabo)
- Walter Centeno (Paté) (c)
- Jervis Drummond
- Rónald Gómez (La Bala)
- José Francisco Porras (Porritas)
- Ronald González (c)
- Juan Bautista Esquivel (Juancho)
- Gilberto Martínez (El Tuma)
- Alonso Solís (El Mariachi)
- Víctor Cordero
- Daniel Torres
- Try Bennett (Triqui - Triqui)
- Douglas Sequeira (c)
- (Honduras) Amado Guevara ("El Lobo")
- José Luis Cancela
- José Luis López Ramírez (El Pupy)
- Christian Bolaños
- Gabriel Badilla (Gladiador)
- Wilson Muñoz
- Randall Azofeifa
- Gerald Drummond (El Venado)
- Allan Aleman (El Super Raton)
- Keylor Navas (Halcon)
- Celso Borges
