= List of Costa Rica international footballers =

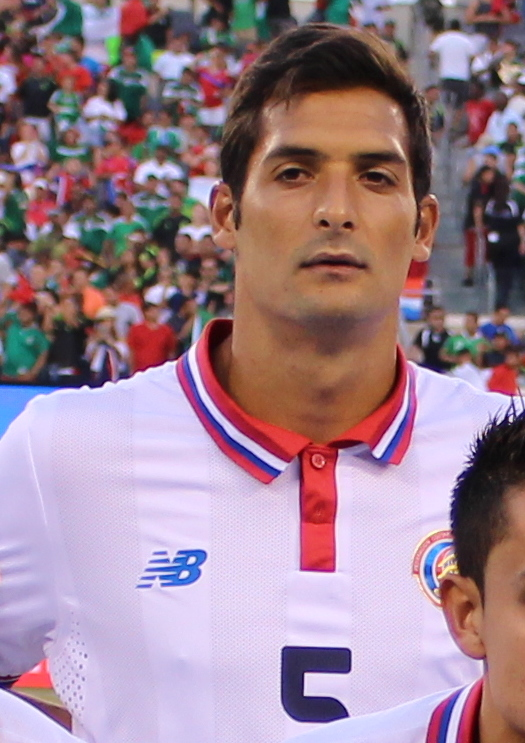
Celso Borges is Costa Rica's most capped international of all time with 163 caps.

The Costa Rica national football team has represented Costa Rica in international football since 1921, when they played their first international, a 7–0 win over El Salvador in the Independence Centenary Games. Organized by the Costa Rican Football Federation, it joined FIFA in 1927 and CONCACAF in 1961.

== Players ==
As of match played 26 March 2024

Key
**Bold**	Played for the national team in the past year

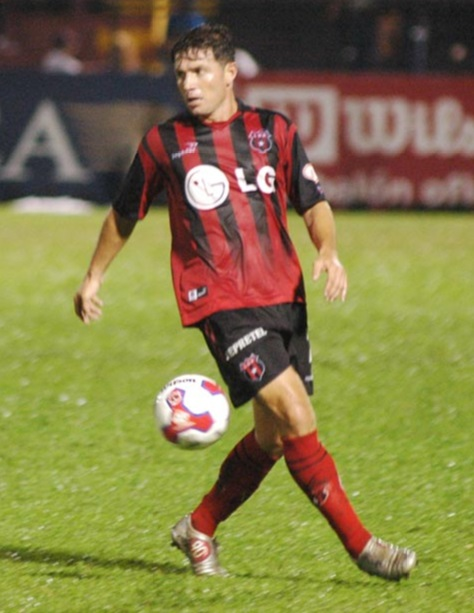
Rolando Fonseca is Costa Rica's top goalscorer with 47 goals from 113 caps.

Costa Rica national team footballers with at least 25 appearances
No.	Name	National career	Caps	Goals
1	Celso Borges	2008–2023	163	27
2	Bryan Ruiz	2005–2022	147	29
3	Walter Centeno	1995–2009	137	24
4	**Joel Campbell**	2011–	136	27
5	Luis Marín	1993–2006	128	5
6	**Keylor Navas**	2008–	114	0
7	Rolando Fonseca	1992–2011	113	47
8	Álvaro Saborío	2002–2021	112	36
9	Mauricio Solís	1993–2006	110	6
10	Michael Umaña	2004–2017	102	1
11	Harold Wallace	1995–2009	101	3
12	Rónald Gómez	1993–2008	91	24
13	**Giancarlo González**	2010–	90	2
14	Hernán Medford	1987–2002	89	18
14	**Francisco Calvo**	2011–	89	10
16	Christian Bolaños	2005–2021	87	6
17	Júnior Díaz	2003–2016	81	1
17	Johan Venegas	2014–	81	11
19	**Yeltsin Tejeda**	2011–	80	1
19	**Bryan Oviedo**	2010–	80	2
21	Cristian Gamboa	2010–2020	79	3
22	Erick Lonnis	1992–2002	76	0
22	Wílmer López	1993–2003	76	6
24	Óscar Ramírez	1985–1997	75	6
24	Óscar Duarte	2010–	75	4
26	Jervis Drummond	1995–2008	73	1
26	Paulo Wanchope	1996–2008	73	45
26	**Kendall Waston**	2013–	73	9
29	Steven Bryce	1998–2005	72	9
30	Jhonny Acosta	2011–2018	70	2
31	Marco Ureña	2009–2020	67	15
31	Mauricio Wright	1995–2005	67	6
33	Austin Berry	1991–2002	65	6
33	Rónald González	1990–2000	65	5
35	David Guzmán	2010–	63	0
35	Jafet Soto	1994–2005	63	10
37	Randall Azofeifa	2005–2018	61	3
37	Leonardo González	2002–2009	61	1
37	Gilberto Martínez	2001–2011	61	0
40	Roy Miller	2005–2015	58	2
41	Mauricio Montero	1985–1996	56	3
41	**Rónald Matarrita**	2015–	56	3
43	Michael Barrantes	2007–2015	54	4
43	José Miguel Cubero	2010–2020	54	2
45	Evaristo Coronado	1983–1992	52	10
45	Enrique Díaz	1979–1992	52	3
47	Víctor Cordero	1995–2008	51	0
47	Marvin Obando	1980–1994	51	1
47	Edgar Quesada	1951–1963	51	3
50	Juan Cayasso	1983–1993	49	9
50	Róger Flores	1983–1991	49	2
52	Carlos Castro	2000–2007	48	1
52	Héctor Marchena	1987–1994	48	0
52	Reynaldo Parks	1993–2003	48	1
52	Alonso Solís	1999–2008	48	8
56	Germán Chavarría	1983–1994	46	1
56	Claudio Jara	1983–1994	46	11
56	Álvaro Grant	1959–1969	46	1
59	Juan José Gámez	1959–1970	45	7
59	Rúben Jiménez	1955–1963	45	11
59	Roy Myers	1990–2000	45	2
62	Ricardo González	1995–2009	44	0
63	Randall Brenes	2005–2014	43	8
63	Wálter Elizondo	1963–1975	43	5
63	Marvin Rodríguez	1955–1961	43	7
66	Douglas Sequeira	1999–2010	42	2
67	Mario Cordero	1950–1963	41	7
68	Carlos Hernández	2004–2014	40	7
69	Pablo Chinchilla	1999–2008	39	1
69	Patrick Pemberton	2010–2017	39	0
71	Álvaro Mesén	1999–2006	38	0
72	Hermidio Barrantes	1989–2000	37	0
73	Álvaro Murillo	1950–1959	36	9
73	Asdrúbal Paniagua	1971–1985	36	0
73	José Salvatierra	2011–2018	36	0
76	Leonel Hernández	1963–1972	35	11
76	Alexander Madrigal	1995–2002	35	2
76	William Sunsing	2000–2009	35	2
76	**Keysher Fuller**	2019–	35	3
80	Rodrigo Cordero	2000–2004	34	1
80	José Luis López	2003–2011	34	0
82	Javier Delgado	1992–2000	33	2
82	Floyd Guthrie	1991–1998	33	3
82	Jose Porras	2004–2007	33	0
85	Luis Diego Arnáez	1991–2004	32	10
85	Alex Sánchez	1950–1963	32	0
85	Carlos Toppings	1979–1984	32	2
85	Rodney Wallace	2011–2018	32	4
89	Francisco Hernández	1967–1980	31	5
89	Edgar Marín	1963–1976	31	4
89	Vladimir Quesada	1989–1996	31	0
92	Leonidas Flores	1984–1996	30	6
93	Gabelo Conejo	1987–1991	29	0
93	Pablo Herrera	2007–2014	29	4
93	Mario Pérez Rodriguez	1955–1971	29	0
96	Danny Fonseca	2003–2008	28	2
96	Víctor Núñez	2006–2013	28	6
96	Óscar Rojas	2001–2012	28	1
96	Erick Scott	2002–2012	28	7
100	Sandro Alfaro	1991–2000	27	1
100	Winston Parks	2001–2011	27	6
100	Roy Sáenz	1965–1970	27	12
100	Juan Ulloa	1955–1962	27	23
104	Gabriel Badilla	2005–2012	26	1
104	Jorge Monge	1955–1961	26	21
104	Allan Oviedo	1996–1999	26	7
107	Carlos Alvarado	1946–1960	25	0
107	Juan Carlos Arguedas	1991–2000	25	4
107	Try Bennett	1995–2007	25	1
107	Freddy Fernández	2007–2009	25	1
107	Andy Herron	2002–2009	25	7
107	Esteban Alvarado	2010–2022	25	0
