= 1993 Copa Interamericana =

- Event: Copa Interamericana
Saprissa	Universidad Católica
(Costa Rica)	(Chile)
4	6
- (on aggregate)

First leg
Saprissa	Universidad Católica
3	1
- Date: September 15, 1994
- Venue: Ricado Saprissa, San José
- Referee: Juan P. Escobar (Guatemala)
- Attendance: 12,000

Second leg
Universidad Católica	Saprissa
5	1
- Date: November 21, 1994
- Venue: San Carlos de Apoquindo, Las Condes
- Referee: Fernando Chappel (Peru)
- Attendance: 5,500

The 1993 Copa Interamericana was the 15th. edition of the Copa Interamericana. The final was contested by Costa Rican team Deportivo Saprissa (winner of 1993 CONCACAF Champions' Cup) and Chilean club Universidad Católica (runner-up of 1993 Copa Libertadores so current champion São Paulo declined to participate). The final was played under a two-leg format in September–November 1994.

The first leg was held in Estadio Ricardo Saprissa Aymá in San José, where Saprissa defeat U. Católica 3–1. The second leg was played at Estadio San Carlos de Apoquindo in Las Condes, where Universidad Católica beat Saprissa 5–1 in extra time. With one win per side, the Chilean team won their first Interamericana cup by goal difference (6–4).

== Qualified teams ==
Team	Qualification	Previous app.
(Chile) Universidad Católica	1993 Copa Libertadores runner-up	None
(Costa Rica) Saprissa	1993 CONCACAF Champions' Cup winner	None

== Venues ==
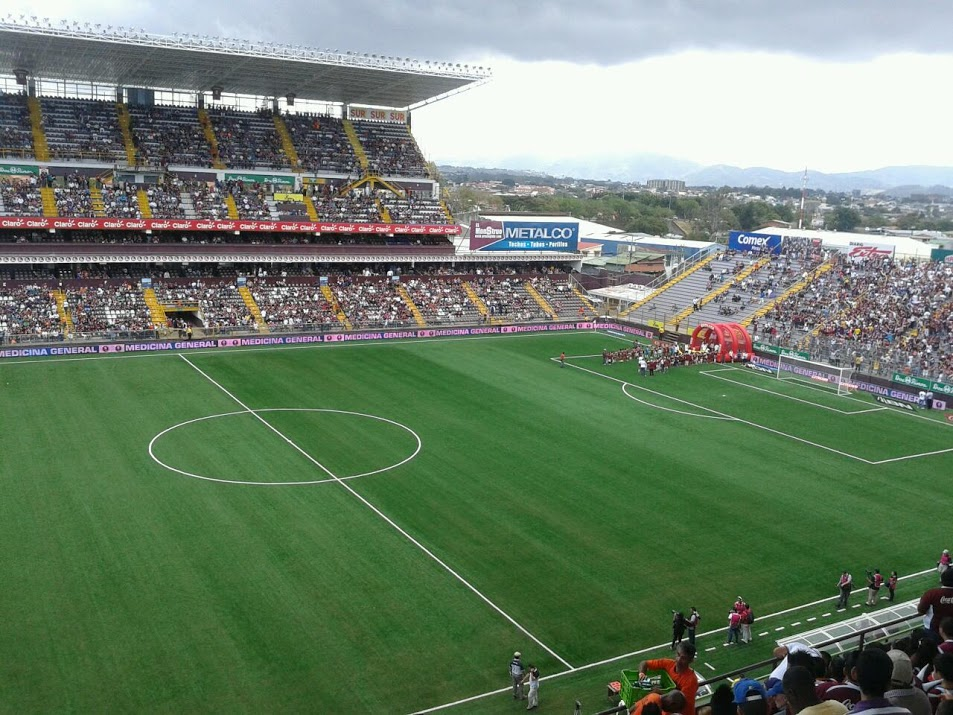
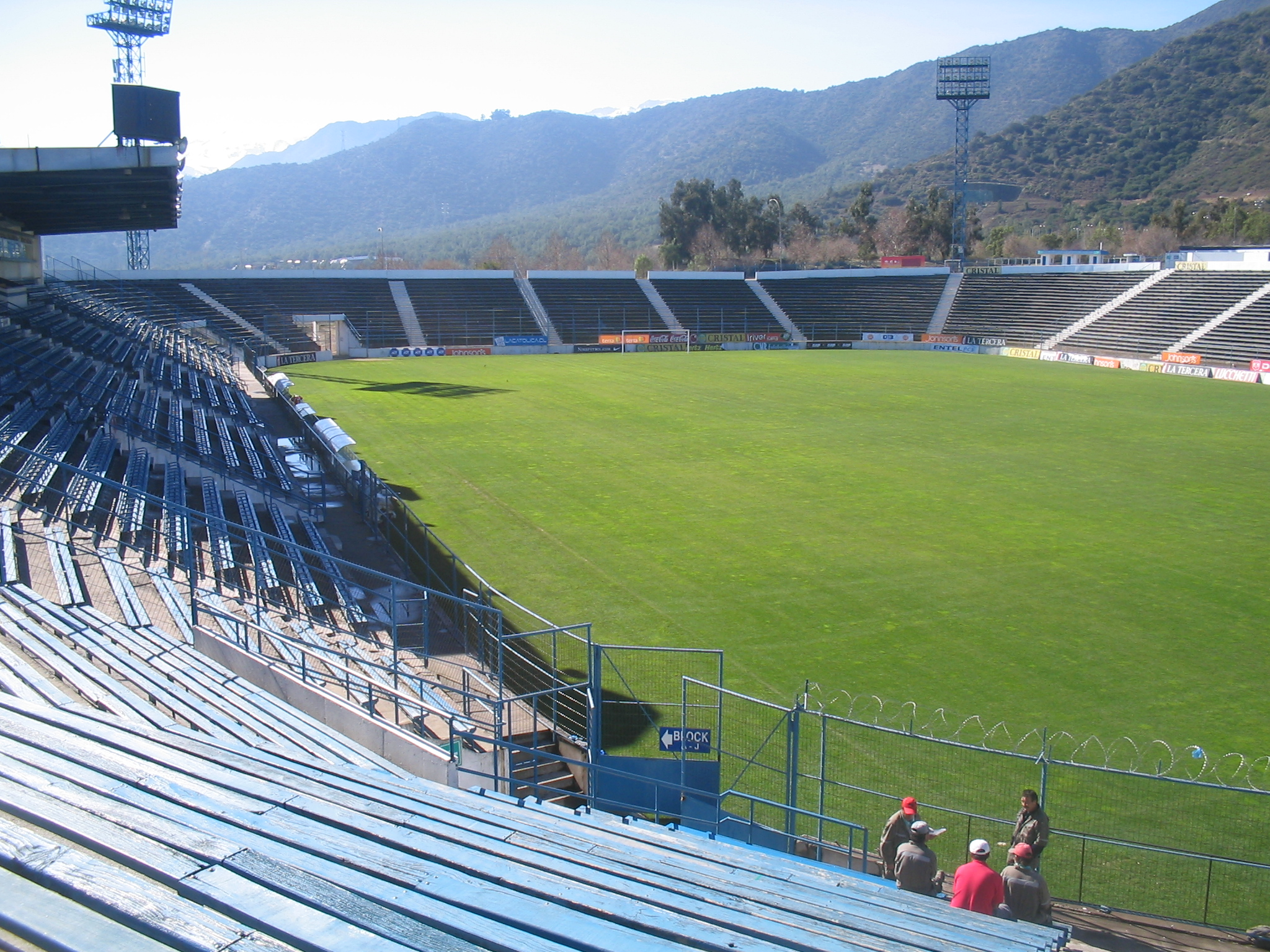
Ricardo Saprissa (left) and San Carlos de Apoquindo stadiums, venues for the series

== Match details ==
=== First leg ===
1993 Copa Interamericana
September 15, 1994
First leg

Saprissa (Costa Rica)	3–1	(Chile) Universidad Católica
Myers 20'; Fonseca 64'; Wanchope 84'	Report	Vázquez 71'

Ricardo Saprissa, San José
Attendance: 12,000
Referee: Juan P. Escobar (Guatemala)

Saprissa	U. Católica

GK	1	(Costa Rica) Erick Lonnis
DF	2	(Costa Rica) Vladimir Quesada
DF	19	(Costa Rica) Mauricio Wright
DF	15	(Costa Rica) Enrique Díaz
DF	3	(Colombia) Edwin Salazar
MF		(Costa Rica) Víctor Cordero
MF		(Costa Rica) Paul Mayorga
MF		(Costa Rica) Óscar Ramírez
FW	7	(Costa Rica) Rolando Fonseca
FW	9	(Costa Rica) Roy Myers	(substituted off) 67'
FW		(Costa Rica) Evaristo Coronado	(substituted off) 71'
Substitutes:
MF		(Costa Rica) Giancarlo Morera	(substituted off) 67'
FW	24	(Costa Rica) Javier Wanchope	(substituted on) 71'
Manager:
(Uruguay) Carlos Linaris

GK	1	(Chile) Patricio Toledo
DF	2	(Chile) Raimundo Tupper
DF	3	(Argentina) Sergio Vázquez
DF		(Chile) Daniel López
DF	6	(Chile) Mario Lepe
MF	4	(Chile) Andrés Romero	(substituted off) b'
MF	8	(Argentina) Jorge G. Vázquez
MF		(Chile) Rodrigo Gómez
MF	10	(Argentina) Néstor Gorosito
FW		(Chile) Luka Tudor	(substituted off) a'
FW	9	(Argentina) Alberto Acosta
Substitutes:
FW		(Chile) Rodrigo Barrera	(substituted on) a'
MF		(Chile) Juvenal Olmos	(substituted on) b'
Manager:
(Chile) Manuel Pellegrini

=== Second leg ===
November 1, 1994
Second leg

Universidad Católica (Chile)	5–1 (a.e.t.)	(Costa Rica) Deportivo Saprissa
Romero 28'; Acosta 30'; Olmos 90'; Ardimán 102'; Barrera 111'	Report	Wanchope 35'

San Carlos de Apoquindo, Las Condes
Attendance: 5,500
Referee: Fernando Chappel (Peru)

U. Católica	Saprissa

GK	1	(Chile) Patricio Toledo
DF	2	(Chile) Raimundo Tupper
DF	3	(Argentina) Sergio Vázquez
DF	4	(Chile) Andrés Romero
DF	13	(Chile) Miguel Ardiman
DF	6	(Chile) Mario Lepe
MF	19	(Chile) Nelson Parraguez
MF	8	(Argentina) Jorge G. Vázquez
MF	10	(Argentina) Néstor Gorosito
FW	9	(Argentina) Alberto Acosta
FW	15	(Chile) Rodrigo Barrera
Substitutes:
FW		(Chile) Rodrigo Barrera	(substituted on) a'
MF		(Chile) Juvenal Olmos	(substituted on) b'
Manager:
(Chile) Manuel Pellegrini

GK	1	(Costa Rica) Erick Lonnis
DF	3	(Colombia) Edwin Salazar
DF	4	(Costa Rica) Rónald González
DF	8	(Costa Rica) Paul Mayorga
DF	2	(Costa Rica) Vladimir Quesada
MF	19	(Costa Rica) Mauricio Wright
MF	15	(Costa Rica) Enrique Díaz
MF	22	(Costa Rica) Óscar Ramírez
MF	24	(Costa Rica) Javier Wanchope
FW	9	(Costa Rica) Roy Myers
FW	7	(Costa Rica) Rolando Fonseca
Substitutes:
		(Costa Rica) Germán Rodríguez	Substituted on
FW		(Costa Rica) Evaristo Coronado	Substituted on
Manager:
(Uruguay) Carlos Linaris
