= Vladimir Quesada =

Costa Rican footballer (born 1966)

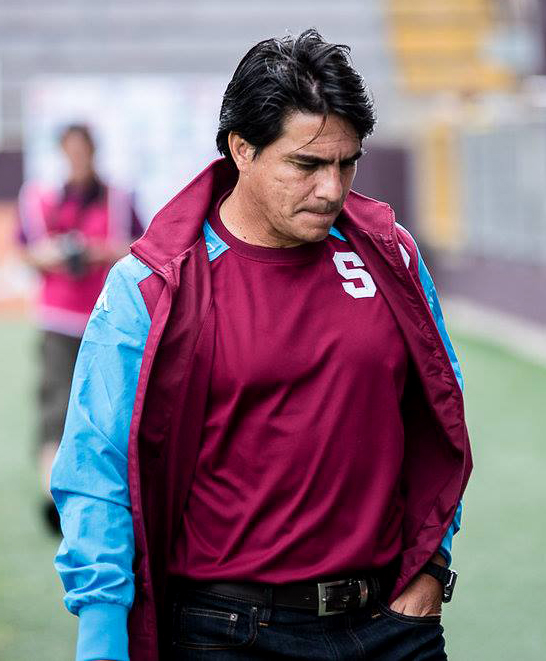
- Quesada as assistant coach for Saprissa in 2016.

Personal information
- Full name: Vladimir Antonio de la Trinidad Quesada Araya
- Date of birth: 12 May 1966 (age 60)
- Place of birth: San José, Costa Rica
- Height: 1.71 m (5 ft 7 1/2 in)
- Position: Rightback

Youth career
- 1978–1985: Saprissa

Senior career*
| Years | Team | Apps | (Gls) |
| 1985–2000 | Saprissa | 400 | (11) |

International career
| 1989–1996 | Costa Rica | 31 | (0) |

Managerial career
- 2002: Saprissa
- 2004–2005: Fusión Tibás
- 2005–2006: Saprissa de Corazón
- 2006–2007: Santos
- 2018–2019: Saprissa
- 2020–2022: Costa Rica U20
- 2023–2024: Saprissa
- 2025–2026: Saprissa
Medal record
Representing Costa Rica
Men's football
CONCACAF Championship
| Gold medal – first place | 1989 | Football |
UNCAF Nations Cup
| Gold medal – first place | 1991 | Football |
- * Club domestic league appearances and goals

Vladimir Antonio de la Trinidad Quesada Araya (born 12 May 1966), is a Costa Rican professional football manager and former player.

== Club career ==
=== Saprissa ===
Vladimir joined Saprissa's youth system in 1978 when he was 12 years old. It wasn’t until the 1985 season that he got his chance with the senior team. Playing as a right-back, Vladimir made his debut on 3 November 1985 in a match against Curridabat, which ended in a 4–2 victory for Saprissa and he played the full match. His first career goal came on 18 September 1988 against Alajuelense, resulting in a 2–2 draw. After forward Evaristo Coronado retired in August 1995, Quesada was chosen as the team captain. His final goal was scored on 1 May 1996, concluding a 4–1 victory over Carmelita. He made a total of 400 league appearances and scored eleven goals. He won six Primera División titles in the 1988, 1989, 1993–94, 1994–95, 1997–98, and 1998–99 seasons.

On the international front, he played 48 matches in Central American and CONCACAF competitions. While at Saprissa, he won the CONCACAF Champions' Cup twice, in 1993 and 1995, and was crowned champion of the Torneo Grandes de Centroamérica in 1998. He was also a runner-up in the 1994 and 1997 editions of the Copa Interamericana, facing the Copa Libertadores champions. On 1 July 2000, he officially retired after fifteen consecutive seasons with the team.

== International career ==
On 1 March 1989, Vladimir was called up alongside Juan Cayasso to join the Costa Rica national team as replacements for Ronald Marín and Joaquín Guillén. His first match under coach Gustavo de Simone was played on 19 March 1989 against the Guatemala team in the first match of the final round of CONCACAF Championship at the Mateo Flores Stadium; Vladimir played the full match, where his team suffered a 1–0 defeat.

He was a part of Costa Rica's World Cup squad in the 1990 World Cup, where he did not make a single appearance.

Under manager Rolando Villalobos, Vladimir played the three matches of the 1991 UNCAF Nations Cup that ended with victories over Honduras (2–0), El Salvador (7–1) and Guatemala (1–0) to become champions of the tournament. That same year, Quesada was also part of the squad that played the inaugural edition of the CONCACAF Gold Cup.

Quesada made a total of 31 performances for the Costa Rica national side, his last match took place on 24 November 1996 in a 1–0 loss against Guatemala.

== Managerial career ==
Quesada pursued studies in Physical Education and Sports Management at the Universidad Nacional (UNA). Starting 3 July 2000, he took on the role of sports secretary for Saprissa. On 15 October 2000, he managed a match against Cartaginés (a 3–0 victory), sharing the head coach position with Evaristo Coronado and Jorge Flores, this one was listed as the main coach. He later served as assistant coach to Argentine Patricio Hernández.

Following Hernández's departure due to poor results on 16 April 2002, the management appointed Vladimir as head coach to finish the Primera División season. He made his solo coaching debut on 21 April in a match against Cartaginés at the Ricardo Saprissa Stadium. Despite a 0–1 defeat, his strategies and improvements in player performance were evident. He coached two more matches to conclude the season, against Herediano (a 0–1 victory) and Pérez Zeledón (a 2–3 loss). On 9 May, he was replaced by Uruguayan Manuel Keosseian and continued coaching Saprissa's youth teams until winning the tournament in 2003.

In July 2004, he was appointed to develop the new Fusión Tibás team in the Liga de Ascenso, combining young and experienced players. He led the team to win the Torneo Apertura and secured the title on 29 December against San Carlos in extra time; the first leg had ended 1–1 at the Carlos Ugalde Stadium, and the second leg also ended 1–1 at the Ricardo Saprissa, with player Armando Alonso scoring the winning goal in the 111th minute. In the Torneo Clausura, his team was eliminated in the semifinals by San Carlos via a penalty shootout (4–5). Having won the previous tournament, the team was seeded for a promotion final against Santacruceña. The first leg on 22 May at the Cacique Diriá Stadium ended in a 3–0 defeat. In the second leg on 28 May at home, his team won 2–1, but it wasn’t enough in the aggregate, so his team finished as league runners-up. On 16 June 2005, the club was dissolved due to acquisition by Deportivo Saprissa. However, Vladimir retained his position and managed Saprissa de Corazón for the 2005–06 season. On 27 March 2006, he was dismissed due to poor results in the Torneo Clausura.

On 11 July 2006, he was appointed head coach of Santos de Guápiles in the Primera División, replacing Uruguayan Daniel Casas. He formally debuted in the Torneo Apertura on 6 August, with a 1–3 loss to Saprissa. He managed a total of sixteen games, winning four, drawing five, and losing seven, with a 35% win rate. On 15 February 2007, he was dismissed after poor performance, having earned two points out of fifteen in the Clausura championship, with losses to Puntarenas (0–2), Cartaginés (1–0), and Saprissa (3–1), and two draws (1–1) against Alajuelense and Brujas.

He served as assistant coach to Carlos Watson during the 2016–17 season with Saprissa, winning the Invierno 2016 championship and finishing as runner-up in the Verano 2017 tournament. Following Watson’s retirement on 17 December 2017, Vladimir was confirmed as the interim coach to face the Torneo Clausura and the CONCACAF Champions League. He debuted on 7 January 2018 with a 0–3 victory over Liberia at the Edgardo Baltodano Stadium. Anecdotally, he was listed as the team’s statistician for the match since he did not yet hold the A-license for top division coaching. This prevented him from holding press conferences after matches, so his assistant Víctor Cordero handled media interactions until the end of the tournament on 20 May, when the team won the league after defeating Herediano in a penalty shootout. On 24 May, Vladimir was confirmed as the permanent coach on a two-year deal and obtained the coaching license needed for press conferences the following season. He was sacked from his duties on 3 February 2019.

On 27 January 2020, Vladimir was appointed head coach of the Costa Rica under-20 team. On 30 April 2022, his team became champions of the UNCAF U-19 Tournament after a comeback 4–5 against El Salvador. Later that year, he led his team in the CONCACAF U-20 Championship and advanced to the next stage, but was eliminated in the quarter-finals by the United States with a score of 2–0. Consequently, the team missed the chance to qualify for the World Cup and the men's Olympic tournament, and at least secured a spot for the tournament in the Central American and Caribbean Games. On 19 October 2022, it was announced that Vladimir would not continue being the manager for the national team.

On 28 March 2023, Vladimir was appointed as interim manager for Saprissa, replacing Jeaustin Campos. His competitive debut came on 29 March with a 1–0 victory against Santos. He led the team to first place and advanced to the semifinals, defeating Herediano in the series. Despite losing the final match to Alajuelense, the series extended to two additional matches, and this time he managed to win with an aggregate score of 3–2, thus securing the league championship. On 6 June 2023, it was confirmed that he would be the permanent head coach of Saprissa for the following season.

Vladimir began the 2023–24 season by winning the Supercopa and the Recopa against Herediano and Cartaginés, respectively. In the Apertura 2023 regular season, he achieved a record of 55 points, making Saprissa the team with the most goals scored (53) and the most victories (18). On 17 December 2023, he won the league title by defeating Herediano in the final, concluding this period with 12 straight victories in the competition. On 13 January 2024, at the start of the Torneo Clausura, a 3–0 victory over Puntarenas extended his winning streak to 13 matches, equaling the record set by Alajuelense in 1998. However, his team was unable to surpass this mark after a 1–0 loss to Pérez Zeledón. At the end of the regular season, Saprissa accumulated 103 points for the entire season and set a new record in the history of semi-annual tournaments. On 26 May 2024, Saprissa defeated Alajuelense with an aggregate score of 3–1 to win another league title.

On 6 October 2024, Quesada left his position as head coach of Saprissa following a 2–3 home defeat to Puntarenas, capping a difficult semester that included elimination from the CONCACAF Central American Cup and losses in the Supercopa, Recopa, and Copa tournaments. Despite winning three league titles during his tenure with the senior team, Saprissa’s board and technical committee decided to part ways due to poor results. Quesada returned to his role in the club’s youth divisions, while his assistants were also dismissed.

On 22 August 2025, Vladimir returned as head coach of Saprissa, replacing Paulo Wanchope after a run of inconsistent results. In the Apertura 2025, the team reached the final but lost to Alajuelense, and also failed to advance from the group stage of the CONCACAF Central American Cup. On 30 January 2026, Saprissa dismissed Quesada following a difficult start to the Clausura 2026, recording one win, one loss, and three draws, including two matches in which the team had to come from behind to secure a point. These results, combined with increasing pressure from the media and supporters, led the club to end his tenure.

== Career statistics ==
=== Club ===
Appearances and goals by club, season and competition
| Club | Season | League | | | Continental | | Other | | Total | |
| Club | Season | Division | Apps | Goals | Apps | Goals | Apps | Goals | Apps | Goals |
|---|---|---|---|---|---|---|---|---|---|---|
| Saprissa | 1985 | Primera División | 6 | 0 | — | | — | | 6 | 0 |
| Saprissa | 1986 | Primera División | 22 | 0 | — | | — | | 22 | 0 |
| Saprissa | 1987 | Primera División | 34 | 0 | 2 (Note: Appearances in CONCACAF Champions' Cup) | 0 | 2 (Note: Appearances in Torneo Centroamericano) | 0 | 38 | 0 |
| Saprissa | 1988 | Primera División | 39 | 2 | — | | — | | 39 | 2 |
| Saprissa | 1989 | Primera División | 33 | 1 | — | | — | | 33 | 1 |
| Saprissa | 1991 | Primera División | 31 | 1 | 2 (Note: Appearances in CONCACAF Champions' Cup) | 1 | 2 (Note: Appearances in CONCACAF Cup Winners Cup) | 0 | 35 | 2 |
| Saprissa | 1992 | Primera División | 33 | 2 | 2 (Note: Appearances in CONCACAF Champions' Cup) | 0 | — | | 35 | 2 |
| Saprissa | 1992–93 | Primera División | 25 | 0 | — | | — | | 25 | 0 |
| Saprissa | 1993–94 | Primera División | 45 | 1 | 5 (Note: Appearances in CONCACAF Champions' Cup) | 0 | — | | 50 | 1 |
| Saprissa | 1994–95 | Primera División | 51 | 2 | 5 (Note: Appearances in CONCACAF Champions' Cup) | 0 | 2 (Note: Appearances in Copa Interamericana) | 0 | 58 | 2 |
| Saprissa | 1995–96 | Primera División | 37 | 2 | 3 (Note: Appearances in CONCACAF Champions' Cup) | 0 | 4 (Note: Appearances in Torneo Grandes de Centroamérica) | 0 | 44 | 2 |
| Saprissa | 1996–97 | Primera División | 17 | 0 | 1 (Note: Appearances in Torneo Grandes de Centroamérica) | 0 | 1 (Note: Appearances in Copa Interamericana) | 0 | 19 | 0 |
| Saprissa | 1997–98 | Primera División | 8 | 0 | 4 (Note: Appearances in CONCACAF Champions' Cup) | 0 | 4 (Note: Appearances in Torneo Grandes de Centroamérica) | 0 | 16 | 0 |
| Saprissa | 1998–99 | Primera División | 7 | 0 | 1 (Note: Appearances in CONCACAF Champions' Cup) | 0 | 7 (Note: Appearances in UNCAF Interclub Cup) | 0 | 15 | 0 |
| Saprissa | 1999-2000 | Primera División | 12 | 0 | — | | 1 (Note: Appearances in UNCAF Interclub Cup) | 0 | 13 | 0 |
| Career total | | | 400 | 11 | 25 | 1 | 23 | 0 | 448 | 12 |

=== International ===
Appearances and goals by national team and year
| National team | Year | Apps | Goals |
|---|---|---|---|
| Costa Rica | 1989 | 8 | 0 |
| Costa Rica | 1990 | 1 | 0 |
| Costa Rica | 1991 | 11 | 0 |
| Costa Rica | 1992 | 6 | 0 |
| Costa Rica | 1996 | 5 | 0 |
| Total | | 31 | 0 |

=== Managerial ===
As of match played 29 January 2026

Managerial record by team and tenure
| Team | From | To | Record | | | | | | | | Ref. |
| Team | From | To | M | W | D | L | GF | GA | GD | Win % | Ref. |
|---|---|---|---|---|---|---|---|---|---|---|---|
| Saprissa | 15 April 2002 | 9 May 2002 | 3 | 1 | 0 | 2 | 3 | 4 | −1 | 33.33 | |
| Fusión Tibás | 24 July 2004 | 15 June 2005 | 40 | 26 | 7 | 7 | 94 | 42 | +52 | 65.00 | |
| Saprissa de Corazón | 16 June 2005 | 27 March 2006 | 32 | 16 | 5 | 11 | 47 | 33 | +14 | 50.00 | |
| Santos | 11 July 2006 | 15 February 2007 | 21 | 4 | 7 | 10 | 18 | 28 | −10 | 19.05 | |
| Saprissa | 18 December 2017 | 3 February 2019 | 64 | 34 | 18 | 12 | 122 | 69 | +53 | 53.13 | |
| Costa Rica U20 | 27 January 2020 | 19 October 2022 | 9 | 4 | 3 | 2 | 18 | 11 | +7 | 44.44 | |
| Saprissa | 28 March 2023 | 6 October 2024 | 103 | 64 | 22 | 17 | 203 | 95 | +108 | 62.14 | |
| Saprissa | 22 August 2025 | 30 January 2026 | 24 | 11 | 8 | 5 | 40 | 29 | +11 | 45.83 | |
| Total | | | 296 | 160 | 70 | 66 | 545 | 311 | +234 | 54.05 | |

== Honours ==
=== Player ===
Saprissa

- Primera División: 1988–89, 1989–90, 1993–94, 1994–95, 1997–98, 1998–99
- CONCACAF Champions Cup: 1993, 1995
- Torneo Grandes de Centroamérica: 1998

Costa Rica

- CONCACAF Championship: 1989
- UNCAF Nations Cup: 1991

=== Manager ===
Saprissa

- Primera División: Clausura 2018, Clausura 2023, Apertura 2023, Clausura 2024
- Supercopa de Costa Rica: 2023
- Recopa de Costa Rica: 2023

Costa Rica U20

- UNCAF U-19 Tournament: 2022

Individual

- Best coach of the season: Clausura 2023, Apertura 2023, Clausura 2024
