= Nelson Parraguez =

Chilean footballer (born 1971)

Personal information
- Full name: Nelson Rodrigo Parraguez Riveros
- Date of birth: April 5, 1971 (age 55)
- Place of birth: Santiago, Chile
- Height: 1.83 m (6 ft 0 in)
- Position: Midfielder

Senior career*
Years	Team	Apps	(Gls)
1989–2000	Universidad Católica	275	(6)
2001	Necaxa	13	(0)
2002	Universidad Católica	10	(0)
2003	Nueva Chicago	13	(0)
2003–2004	Universidad Católica	24	(0)
Total		335	(6)

International career
1991–2001	Chile	52	(0)
- * Club domestic league appearances and goals as of September 2008

Nelson Rodrigo Parraguez Riveros (born April 5, 1971) is a retired Chilean football midfielder who was capped 52 times for the Chile national team between 1991 and 2001, including three games at the 1998 FIFA World Cup.

Paraguez played most of his career for Universidad Católica where he won one league title and two Copa Chile.

He also played abroad for Necaxa of Mexico and Nueva Chicago of Argentina.

== Honours ==
=== Club ===
Universidad Católica

- Copa Interamericana (1): 1993
- Primera División de Chile (1): 1997 Apertura
- Copa Chile (2): 1991, 1995

=== International ===
Chile

- Copa Ciudad de Valparaíso (1): 2000
