= José Porras =

Costa Rican footballer (born 1970)

José Francisco Porras
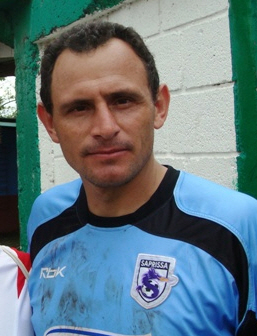
- Porras with Saprissa in 2007

Personal information
- Full name: José Francisco Porras Hidalgo
- Date of birth: November 8, 1970 (age 55)
- Place of birth: Grecia, Alajuela, Costa Rica
- Height: 1.84 m (6 ft 0 in)
- Position: Goalkeeper

Senior career*
Years	Team	Apps	(Gls)
1989–1993	Herediano	23	(0)
1993–1994	Belén	18	(0)
1994–1995	Puntarenas	29	(0)
1995–1996	Carmelita	20	(0)
1996–2000	Saprissa	29	(0)
2000–2002	Carmelita	31	(0)
2002–2008	Saprissa	124	(0)
2009	Carmelita	15	(0)
Total		289	(0)

International career^{‡}
1987	Costa Rica U17		
1989	Costa Rica U20		
2004–2008	Costa Rica	33	(0)
- * Club domestic league appearances and goals as of 20 June 2006 ‡ National team caps and goals as of 21:53, 2 June 2009 (UTC)

José Francisco Porras Hidalgo (born 8 November 1970) is a Costa Rican retired footballer who last played for Carmelita in Costa Rica.

Currently, he is the technical secretary at Saprissa.

== Club career ==
Porras made his debut in Costa Rica's Primera División for Herediano on 3 February 1991 against Guanacasteca and conceded his first league goal three days later against Saprissa. He played for Belén, Puntarenas and Carmelita during the 90s, before joining Saprissa in 1996. He returned to Carmelita in 2000 but rejoined Saprissa in 2002.

Porras spent several years on Saprissa's bench before being given his opportunity to shine. However, because Erick Lonnis, the star goalkeeper for Saprissa and Costa Rica, was at the pinnacle of his career, Porras had to patiently wait for his chance. After Lonnis's retirement, Porras managed to establish himself in both Saprissa's and the national team's goal. With Saprissa, he won three national championships, a UNCAF Cup and a CONCACAF Champions Cup title. With Porras in goal, Saprissa finished third in the FIFA Club World Championship 2005, behind São Paulo and Liverpool. He ended up playing 213 games for Saprissa.

In January 2009, Porras announced his retirement at the end of the 2009 Verano season. He won 9 league titles during his career, 8 with Saprissa and 1 with Herediano.

== International career ==
Porras was a non-playing squad member at the 1989 FIFA World Youth Championship in Saudi Arabia.

He made his international debut for Costa Rica in a June 2004 friendly match against Nicaragua and earned a total of 33 caps, scoring no goals. He represented his country in 7 FIFA World Cup qualification matches and played in the 2006 FIFA World Cup after being named in coach Alexandre Guimarães's selection. He also played at the 2005 and 2007 UNCAF Nations Cup, as well as at the 2005 and 2007 CONCACAF Gold Cups and the 2004 Copa América.

His final international was a November 2007 friendly match against Panama.

== Honours ==
- CONCACAF Gold Cup All-Tournament team (Honorable Mention): 2007

== Personal life ==
Porras is a son of Naín Porras and Edith Hidalgo. He is married to Karla Sánchez and they have a daughter, Karol Sofía and Amanda.
