= Gerardo Ureña =

Costa Rican footballer (born 1955)

Personal information
- Full name: Manuel Gerardo Ureña Picado
- Date of birth: July 6, 1955 (age 71)
- Place of birth: San José, Costa Rica
- Position: Midfielder

Senior career*
Years	Team	Apps	(Gls)
1975–1986	Saprissa		
1986–1987	San Carlos		
1987–1988	Pérez Zeledón		

International career
1979–1980	Costa Rica	7	(0)

Managerial career
- 1992–1995: Sagrada Familia
- 2002–2008: Costa Rica U-17
- 2009: Guanacasteca
- 2010–2012: Aserrí
- 2015: Belén
- * Club domestic league appearances and goals

Manuel Gerardo Ureña Picado (born 6 July 1955) is a retired Costa Rican football player who played most of his career with Deportivo Saprissa, during the 1970s and 1980s. He is the current manager of Costa Rican Primera División side Belén.

== Club career ==
With Saprissa, he won three national championships, starting off as part of the Saprissa team that won 6 national championships in a row during the 70's. He later had spells at San Carlos and Pérez Zeledón.

== International career ==
Nicknamed el Puro, Ureña played for Costa Rica, earning 7 caps. He represented his country in 3 FIFA World Cup qualification matches in 1980.

== Managerial career ==
He has also coached Costa Rica national football team, at the U-17 level but was fired in October 2008 after coaching different national age group teams for over 100 matches. In September 2010 he was announced manager of second division Aserrí.

He became minor league coordinator at Saprissa in 2012. In February 2015, Ureña was appointed manager of Belén.
