= Carlos Linaris =

Uruguayan footballer (born 1951)

Personal information
- Full name: Carlos Orlando Linaris Velo
- Date of birth: 1951 (age 74–75)
- Place of birth: Uruguay
- Height: 1.80 m (5 ft 11 in)
- Position: Midfielder

Senior career*
Years	Team	Apps	(Gls)
1968–1971	Rampla Juniors		
1971–1973	Panathinaikos	1	(0)
1973	Rampla Juniors		
1974–1976	Green Cross-Temuco	81	(11)
1977–1978	Lota Schwager	58	(12)
1979	Huachipato		
1980	River Plate Montevideo		
1981	San Lorenzo		

Managerial career
- 1992–1993: Rampla Juniors
- 1993–1995: Saprissa
- 1999: River Plate Montevideo
- 1999–2000: Universidad SC
- 2000: Herediano
- 2001: Comunicaciones
- 2003: Santos de Guápiles
- 2009: Ramonense
- 2011: Cartaginés
- * Club domestic league appearances and goals

Carlos Orlando Linaris Velo (born 1951) is a Uruguayan former professional footballer who played as a midfielder.

== Playing career ==
When he became 17 years he began his career playing for Rampla Juniors in the first division of Uruguay. In the club of Montevideo played for four years. In 1971 he moved in Greece to play for Panathinaikos. In 1973 he returned to Rampla Juniors and was selected from University of Uruguay playing even parties in Paris. Andrés Prieto recommended Linaris to play for Green Cross-Temuco in Chile. He played for three years between 1974 and 1976.

Next year he played for Lota Schwager, requested by Vicente Cantatore and he made his debut on 6 February for the Copa Chile against Huachipato. The 6th place in the first division was the best run in the team's history and Linaris was one of the best players of the coal team. The following year participated in almost all the games of Lota Schwager and was also scored three goals against Rangers de Talca. Following Lota Schwager, he played for Huachipato.

He ended his career with River Plate Montevideo and San Lorenzo.

== Managerial career ==
Linaris started a career as coach at youth level in his homeland and, subsequently, he led Rampla Juniors.

Linaris developed a Coach career in Costa Rica where he has been coach of Deportivo Saprissa, Santos de Guápiles, Herediano and Cartaginés. With Saprissa he played in the final of the Inter-American Cup against Universidad Católica.
