= 1993 CONCACAF Champions' Cup =

29th edition of premier club football tournament organized by CONCACAF

Tournament details
- Host country: Guatemala
- City: Guatemala City
- Dates: 1 – 5 December (Final Tournament)
- Teams: 4 (from 4 associations)

Final positions
- Champions: (Costa Rica) Saprissa (1st title)
- Runners-up: (Mexico) León

Tournament statistics
- Matches played: 6
- Goals scored: 21 (3.5 per match)

The 1993 CONCACAF Champions' Cup was the 29th edition of the annual international club football competition held in the CONCACAF region (North America, Central America and the Caribbean), the CONCACAF Champions' Cup. It determined that year's club champion of association football in the CONCACAF region and was played from 23 January to 5 December 1993.

The teams were split in two zones (North/Central and Caribbean), being the best three from the North/Central and the best team from Caribbean to qualify to the final tournament. All qualifying matches in the tournament were played under the home/away match system while the final tournament was played in a group system in Guatemala City.

That final stage composed of four teams which played each other in a single round-robin tournament. Costa Rican team Saprissa crowned CONCACAF champion for their first time, after finishing first in the final with a goal difference of +8.

== North and Central American Zone ==
=== Preliminary round ===
Team 1	Agg.	Team 2	1st leg	2nd leg
Acros Real Verdes (Belize)	1 - 5	(Honduras) Real España	1 - 2	0 - 3
Juventus (Belize)	4 w/o 0	(United States) Hercules	2 - 0^{1}	2 - 0^{1}
Diriangén (Nicaragua)	1 - 5	(El Salvador) Alianza	0 - 2	1 - 3
Sporting Colón (Panama)	1 - 4	(Guatemala) Comunicaciones	0 - 1	1 - 3
Plaza Amador (Panama)	9 - 0	(Nicaragua) Juventus Managua	5 - 0	4 - 0

^{1} Hercules withdrew before 1st leg, and both legs awarded 2–0 to Juventus.

Acros Real Verdes (Belize)	1–2	(Honduras) Real España	Belize City, Belize
Goal		Luis Vallejo; Carlos Pavón	Stadium: MCC Grounds

Real España (Honduras)	3–0 (5–1 agg.)	(Belize) Acros Real Verdes	San Pedro Sula, Honduras
José Luis Aguirre; Nahamán González; Jaime Ruiz			Stadium: Estadio FranciscoMorazán

Juventus (Belize)	2–0	(United States) Hercules

Hercules (United States)	0–2 (0–4 w/o agg.)	(Belize) Juventus

Diriangén (Nicaragua)	0–2	(El Salvador) Alianza	Diriamba, Nicaragua
		Hugo Neira; Bernando Orantes	Stadium: Estadio Cacique Diriangén

Alianza (El Salvador)	3–1 (5–1 agg.)	(Nicaragua) Diriangén	San Salvador, El Salvador
Rene Duran; Milton Melendez			Stadium: Estadio Cuscatlán

27 May 1993	Sporting Colón (Panama)	0–1	(Guatemala) Comunicaciones	Colon, Panama
			José Roderico Méndez 86'	Stadium: Estadio Roberto Mariano Bula

Comunicaciones (Guatemala)	3–1 (4–1 agg.)	(Panama) Sporting Colón	Guatemala City, Guatemala
			Stadium: Estadio Doroteo Guamuch Flores

29 May 1993	Juventus Managua (Nicaragua)	0–5	(Panama) Plaza Amador	Panama City, Panama
			Fernando Bolívar; Rolando Botello; Hernán Lorenzo; Carlos Maldonado; Bernardo Rivas	Stadium: Estadio Rommel Fernández

Plaza Amador (Panama)	4–0 (9–0 agg.)	(Nicaragua) Juventus Managua	Panama City, Panama
Carlos Maldonado; Rolando Botello; Hernán Lorenzo			Stadium: Estadio Rommel Fernández

=== First round ===
Team 1	Agg.	Team 2	1st leg	2nd leg
Comunicaciones (Guatemala)	2–5	(Costa Rica) Alajuelense	2–1	0–4
Juventus (Belize)	1–8	(Honduras) Motagua	1–3	0–5
Alianza (El Salvador)	1–5	(Guatemala) Municipal	0–2	1–3
Plaza Amador (Panama)	2–8	(El Salvador) Firpo	2–2	0–6
Real España (Honduras)	0–4	(Mexico) León	0–0	0–4
Saprissa (Costa Rica)	1–1; 6–5 (pen.)	(Mexico) Puebla	1–1	0–0

24 June 1993	Comunicaciones (Guatemala)	2–1	(Costa Rica) Alajuelense	Guatemala City, Guatemala
	José Roderico Méndez			Stadium: Estadio Doroteo Guamuch Flores

Alajuelense (Costa Rica)	4–0 (5–2 agg.)	(Guatemala) Comunicaciones	San José, Costa Rica
Eugenio Dolmo Flores; Ronald Gómez; Alexander Viquez			Stadium: Estadio Alejandro Morera Soto

24 June 1993	Juventus (Belize)	1–3	(Honduras) Motagua	Belize City
			Rui Freitas Santos; Roland Presley Carson	Stadium: MCC Grounds

30 June 1993	Motagua (Honduras)	5–0 (8–1 agg.)	(Belize) Juventus	Tegucigalpa, Honduras
	Jose Ramón Romero; Rui Freitas Santos; Nestor Martinez; Fabricio Perez			Stadium: Estadio Tiburcio Carías Andino

24 June 1993	Alianza (El Salvador)	0–2	(Guatemala) Municipal	San Salvador, El Salvador
			Ruben Gonzalez	Stadium: Estadio Cuscatlán

Municipal (Guatemala)	3–1 (5–1 agg.)	(El Salvador) Alianza	Guatemala City, Guatemala
Ruben Gonzalez; Marvin Gordon; Jorge Rodas			Stadium: Estadio Doroteo Guamuch Flores

23 May 1993	Plaza Amador (Panama)	2–2	(El Salvador) Firpo	Usulután, El Salvador
	Hernan Lorenzo Diaz; Jesus Gonzalez		Jose Garcia; Edgar Henriquez	Stadium: Estadio Sergio Torres

2 June 1993	Firpo (El Salvador)	6–0 (8–2 agg.)	(Panama) Plaza Amador	Panama City, Panama
	Celio Rodríguez			Stadium: Estadio Rommel Fernández

Real España (Honduras)	0–0	(Mexico) León	San Pedro Sula, Honduras
			Stadium: Estadio Francisco Morazán

León (Mexico)	4–0 (4–0 agg.)	(Honduras) Real España	León, Mexico
			Stadium: Estadio León

29 August 1993	Saprissa (Costa Rica)	1–1	(Mexico) Puebla	San Juan de Tibás, Costa Rica
	Roy Myers		Narciso Cuevas	Stadium: Estadio Ricardo Saprissa

Puebla (Mexico)	0–0 (1–1 agg.)	(Costa Rica) Saprissa	Puebla, Mexico
			Stadium: Estadio Cuauhtémoc

=== Second round ===
Team 1	Agg.	Team 2	1st leg	2nd leg
Alajuelensse (Costa Rica)	1 - 2	(Mexico) León	0 - 0	1 - 2
Motagua (Honduras)	0 - 2	(Guatemala) Municipal	0 - 1	0 - 1
Saprissa (Costa Rica)	3 - 2	(El Salvador) Firpo	2 - 0	1 - 2

- León, Municipal and Saprissa advance to the CONCACAF Final Tournament.

Alajuelense (Costa Rica)	0–0	(Mexico) León	San José, Costa Rica
			Stadium: Estadio Alejandro Morera Soto

León (Mexico)	2–1 (2–1 agg.)	(Costa Rica) Alajuelense	León, Mexico
			Stadium: Estadio León

5 September 1993	Motagua (Honduras)	0–1	(Guatemala) Municipal	Tegucigalpa, Honduras
				Stadium: Estadio Nacional Chelato Uclés

19 September 1993	Municipal (Guatemala)	1–0 (2–0 agg.)	(Honduras) Motagua	Guatemala City, Guatemala
				Stadium: Estadio Doroteo Guamuch Flores

19 September 1993 Round 4	Saprissa (Costa Rica)	2–0	(El Salvador) Firpo	San Juan de Tibás, Costa Rica
(UTC−06:00)	Hernan Medford 46'			Stadium: Estadio Ricardo Saprissa

22 September 1993 Round 1	Firpo (El Salvador)	2–1 (2–3 agg.)	(Costa Rica) Saprissa	Usulután, El Salvador
(UTC−06:00)	Raul Diaz Arce; Edgar Henriquez		Rolando Fonseca	Stadium: Estadio Sergio Torres

== Caribbean Zone ==
=== First round ===
Team 1	Agg.	Team 2	1st leg	2nd leg
Zion Inter (United States Virgin Islands)	0 - 4	(Guadeloupe) L'Etoile de Morne-à-l'Eau	0 - 2^{1}	0 - 2^{1}
Club Franciscain (Martinique)	16 - 3	(United States Virgin Islands) Coca Cola Rovers	10 - 1	6 - 2
Aiglon du Lamentin (Martinique)	4 - 0	(Haiti) Racing Gonaïves	2 - 0^{1}	2 - 0^{1}
RKVFC Sithoc (Netherlands Antilles)	4 - 0	(Trinidad and Tobago) Hawks FC	2 - 0^{1}	2 - 0^{1}
AS Club Colonial (French Guiana)	0 - 2	(Suriname) SV Robinhood	0 - 1	0 - 1
AS Juventa (Guadeloupe)	4 - 0	(Haiti) Tempête Football Club	2 - 0^{1}	2 - 0^{1}
SV Leo Victor (Suriname)	1 - 3	(French Guiana) ASL Sport Guyanais	0 - 0	1 - 3
Trintoc F.C. (Trinidad and Tobago)	4 - 0	(Netherlands Antilles) SV Juventus	2 - 0	2 - 0

^{1} Zion Inter, Racing Gonaïves, Tempête and Hawks all withdrew before 1st leg, and their rivals were awarded 2–0 wins in each of both matches.

Club Franciscain (Martinique)	10–1	(United States Virgin Islands) Coca Cola Rovers

Coca Cola Rovers (United States Virgin Islands)	2–6 (3–16 agg.)	(Martinique) Club Franciscain

AS Club Colonial (French Guiana)	0–1	(Suriname) SV Robinhood

SV Robinhood (Suriname)	1–0 (2–0 agg.)	(French Guiana) AS Club Colonial

SV Leo Victor (Suriname)	0–0	(French Guiana) ASL Sport Guyanais

ASL Sport Guyanais (French Guiana)	3–1 (3–1 agg.)	(Suriname) SV Leo Victor

Trintoc F.C. (Trinidad and Tobago)	2–0	(Netherlands Antilles) SV Juventus

SV Juventus (Netherlands Antilles)	0–2 (0–4 agg.)	(Trinidad and Tobago) Trintoc F.C.

=== Second round ===
Team 1	Agg.	Team 2	1st leg	2nd leg
AS Juventa (Guadeloupe)	0 - 3	(Martinique) Club Franciscain	0 - 1	0 - 2
Aiglon du Lamentin (Martinique)	3 - 0	(Guadeloupe) L'Etoile de Morne-à-l'Eau	3 - 0	0 - 0
RKVFC Sithoc (Netherlands Antilles)	2 - 4	(Suriname) SV Robinhood	2 - 1	0 - 3
Trintoc F.C. (Trinidad and Tobago)	3 - 1	(French Guiana) ASL Sport Guyanais	2 - 0	1 - 1

AS Juventa (Guadeloupe)	0–1	(Martinique) Club Franciscain

Club Franciscain (Martinique)	2–0 (3–0 agg.)	(Guadeloupe) AS Juventa

Aiglon du Lamentin (Martinique)	3–0	(Guadeloupe) L'Etoile de Morne-à-l'Eau

L'Etoile de Morne-à-l'Eau (Guadeloupe)	0–0 (0–3 agg.)	(Martinique) Aiglon du Lamentin

RKVFC Sithoc (Netherlands Antilles)	2–1	(Suriname) SV Robinhood

SV Robinhood (Suriname)	3–0 (4–2 agg.)	(Netherlands Antilles) RKVFC Sithoc

Trintoc F.C. (Trinidad and Tobago)	2–0	(French Guiana) ASL Sport Guyanais

ASL Sport Guyanais (French Guiana)	1–1 (1–3 agg.)	(Trinidad and Tobago) Trintoc F.C.

=== Semifinals ===
Team 1	Agg.	Team 2	1st leg	2nd leg
Club Franciscain (Martinique)	1 - 3	(Martinique) Aiglon du Lamentin	1 - 1	0 - 2
SV Robinhood (Suriname)	1 - 0	(Trinidad and Tobago) Trintoc FC	1 - 0	0 - 0

Club Franciscain (Martinique)	1–1	(Martinique) Aiglon du Lamentin

Aiglon du Lamentin (Martinique)	2–0 (3–1 agg.)	(Martinique) Club Franciscain

SV Robinhood (Suriname)	1–0	(Trinidad and Tobago) Trintoc FC

Trintoc FC (Trinidad and Tobago)	0–0 (0–1 agg.)	(Suriname) SV Robinhood

=== Final ===
Team 1	Agg.	Team 2	1st leg	2nd leg
Aiglon du Lamentin (Martinique)	2 - 3	(Suriname) SV Robinhood	1 - 0	1 - 3

- SV Robinhood advance to the CONCACAF Final Tournament.

Aiglon du Lamentin (Martinique)	1–0	(Suriname) SV Robinhood

SV Robinhood (Suriname)	3–1 (3–2 agg.)	(Martinique) Aiglon du Lamentin

== Final tournament ==
Pos	Team	Pld	W	D	L	GF	GA	GD	Pts	Status
1	(Costa Rica) Saprissa	3	1	2	0	11	3	+8	4	1993 CONCACAF Champions' Cup champions
2	(Mexico) León	3	1	2	0	6	2	+4	4	
3	(Guatemala) Municipal	3	1	2	0	3	0	+3	4	
4	(Suriname) Robinhood	3	0	0	3	1	16	−15	0	

=== Matches ===
1 December 1993 Round 1	León (Mexico)	2–2	(Costa Rica) Saprissa	Guatemala City, Guatemala
(UTC−06:00)	Queiroz 36' (pen.) 60'	Report	Ramírez 25'; Díaz 46'	Stadium: Estadio Mateo Flores

1 December 1993 Round 1	Municipal (Guatemala)	3–0	(Suriname) Robinhood	Guatemala City, Guatemala
(UTC−06:00)	Rodas; González	Report		Stadium: Estadio Mateo Flores

3 December 1993 Round 2	León (Mexico)	4–0	(Suriname) Robinhood	Guatemala City, Guatemala
(UTC−06:00)	Queiroz 19' 23'; Vanderley 46'; Ayipei 77'	Report		Stadium: Estadio Mateo Flores

3 December 1993 Round 2	Municipal (Guatemala)	0–0	(Costa Rica) Saprissa	Guatemala City, Guatemala
(UTC−06:00)		Report		Stadium: Estadio Mateo Flores

5 December 1993 Round 3	Robinhood (Suriname)	1–9	(Costa Rica) Saprissa	Guatemala City, Guatemala
(UTC−06:00)	Rigters	Report	Medford; Fonseca; Coronado; Myers	Stadium: Estadio Mateo Flores

5 December 1993 Round 3	Municipal (Guatemala)	0–0	(Mexico) León	Guatemala City, Guatemala
(UTC−06:00)		Report		Stadium: Estadio Mateo Flores

== Champion ==
1993 CONCACAF Champions' Cup Champion
(Costa Rica)
Saprissa
1st title
