= Fernando Hernández (footballer) =

Costa Rican footballer (1944-1997)

Personal information
- Full name: Fernando Hernández Ramírez
- Date of birth: 28 May 1944
- Place of birth: Costa Rica
- Date of death: 4 May 1997 (aged 52)
- Place of death: Costa Rica
- Position: Midfielder

Senior career*
Years	Team	Apps	(Gls)
1965–1978	Saprissa		

International career
1968–1972	Costa Rica	10	(1)
- * Club domestic league appearances and goals

Fernando Hernández Ramírez (May 28, 1944 – May 4, 1997), known in his native Costa Rica as El Príncipe (The Prince), was a footballer.

== Club career ==
He played his entire career for Deportivo Saprissa, and is considered an idol for their fans. He won a total of eleven titles with them, including six consecutive championships from 1972 to 1977, a record both in Costa Rica as well as in the American continent.

== International career ==
He played 10 games for the Costa Rica national football team during the 60's and 70's, scoring one goal. He represented his country in 2 FIFA World Cup qualification matches.

=== International goals ===
Scores and results list Costa Rica's goal tally first.

N.	Date	Venue	Opponent	Score	Result	Competition
1.	6 August 1972	Estadio Nacional, San José, Costa Rica	Mexico	1–0	1-0	Friendly match

== Personal life and death ==
His parents were Víctor Hernández and Teresa Ramírez. His brother, Francisco Hernández, played with Saprissa's midfield too.

Fernando died on May 4, 1997, as a victim of cancer at age 52 years.

== See also ==
- Pastor Pacheco, José Antonio (1998). Historia del Deportivo Saprissa. Fotorama de Centroamérica. ISBN 9977-9939-0-4.
