= Sporting Colón =

- Full name: Sporting Colón
- Nickname(s): Los correcaminos Los tomahawks
- Founded: 1991
- Dissolved: 1994
- Ground: Estadio Roberto Mariano Bula; Colón, Panama
- Capacity: 2,500
- League: ANAPROF
Home colours	Away colours

Sporting Colón was a Panamanian football team based on Colón, Panama.

Los correcaminos, as they were known, was a historic team for Colón as they hold numerous records for the province such as being their first team in ANAPROF, first to reach a final in the 1992–93 season and first to play at an international level during the 1993 season of the CONCACAF Champions' Cup.

== History ==
Sporting Colón's short history in ANAPROF began in 1991 after being promoted from the Copa Rommel Fernández in the 1991 season alongside UTP (up until 1995, the winners from the Copa Rommel Fernández were promoted to ANAPROF). In their first season in the Panamanian top league, Sporting Colón finished in a disappointing 7th place out of 8 teams in the competition. However, the next season proved to be completely different. In the 1992–93 championship, Sporting Colón surprisingly reached the final after a disastrous first round which followed an impressive run in the second round of the championship that granted them the chance to play in ANAPROF's first final against Plaza Amador. Before, however, they defeated Pan de Azúcar 3–2 in extra time in the semifinals. The final was played on January 17, 1993, at the Estadio Revolución (now Estadio Rommel Fernández) and Plaza Amador defeated Sporting Colón 3–0. Nevertheless, this runner-up position gave the correcaminos the chance to play in the CONCACAF Champions' Cup later that year. The next season, however, was Sporting Colón's last in ANAPROF. The year started with a disappointing elimination against Guatemalan side Comunincaciones in the preliminary round of the CONCACAF Champions' Cup competition after being defeated twice on a 4–2 aggregate score. In ANAPROF, although the team finished 3rd in the general table and therefore earning them a spot in the semifinals, they were eliminated by Euro Kickers with a 2–3 aggregate score. Their last game in ANAPROF was on November 21 at the Pedregaleña and they defeated Euro Kickers 1–0.

Although it is still not completely clear why Sporting Colón did not participate in the following season of the ANAPROF championship it has been said that after the split between ANAPROF and LINFUNA (which had the Panamanian Football Federation's endorsement) many sport leaders joined LINFUNA instead of ANAPROF, among those was Colón's sport leadership. As the province already had a team participating in the competition (Árabe Unido) many players from Sporting Colón were forced to leave the team and join Árabe Unido in order to play in LINFUNA (among those included Rogelio Clarke, Martín Tuñon and Eric Medina). After this incident, Sporting Colón ceased to exist as a professional football team.

== Honours ==
- ANAPROF:

- Runners-up (1): 1992–93

- Copa Rommel Fernández: 1

1991

== Performance in CONCACAF competitions ==
- CONCACAF Champions' Cup: 1 appearance

1993: Preliminary Round (North and Central American Zone)

== Historical list of coaches ==
- (Panama) Eugenio Williams (1991)
- (Panama) Luis Hurtado (1992–1993)
- (Peru) Pascual "Chato" Ramirez
