= Marco Antonio Rojas =

Costa Rican footballer (born 1952)

Personal information
- Full name: Marco Antonio Rojas Porras
- Date of birth: November 8, 1952 (age 73)
- Place of birth: San José, Costa Rica
- Height: 1.80 m (5 ft 11 in)
- Position: Goalkeeper

Senior career*
Years	Team	Apps	(Gls)
1972–1987	Saprissa		
1988	Cartaginés		
1988	Limonense		
1989	Saprissa		

International career
–1985	Costa Rica	22	(0)
- * Club domestic league appearances and goals

Marcos Antonio Rojas Porras (born 8 November 1952) is a Costa Rican retired footballer. He is considered by some as the best goalkeeper in Costa Rica's history.

== Club career ==
Rojas played almost his entire career for Deportivo Saprissa, where he is still regarded as an idol. He played a total of 17 seasons, winning seven national titles, including a record six consecutive titles, and three "Fraternidad" international championships with Saprissa, amassing a total of 331 games. He also played for Cartaginés and Limonense in 1988.

In 2007, Rojas was nominated for a place in Costa Rica's sports hall of fame.

== International career ==
Rojas also played for the Costa Rica national football team during the 70's and 80's. He was Costa Rica's captain during the 1984 Olympic Games held in Los Angeles, in which the Ticos beat the then World Cup Champions Italy (1-0). He represented his country in 6 FIFA World Cup qualification matches. He also represented Costa Rica at the 1975 Pan American Games in Mexico.

== Personal life ==
Rojas is married to television presenter Vicky Chávez and they had two daughters, their oldest was killed in a car accident in February 2011.
