= Javier Wanchope =

Costa Rican footballer (born 1968)

Personal information
- Full name: Javier Vicente Wanchope Watson
- Date of birth: August 10, 1968 (age 58)
- Place of birth: Limón, Costa Rica
- Position: Striker

Senior career*
Years	Team	Apps	(Gls)
1985–1991	Herediano		
1986	Curridabat		
1991–1993	Nacional		
1993	Defensor Sporting		
1994–1997	Saprissa		
1997–1998	Carmelita		
1998–1999	Suchitepéquez		
1999–2002	Santa Bárbara		

International career
1989–1996	Costa Rica	11	(0)

Managerial career
- 2006: El Roble de Alajuela
- 2010–2011: Herediano (assistant)
- 2011: Turrialba
- 2012–2013: Panama U20
- 2013–2014: Atlético Chiriquí
- * Club domestic league appearances and goals

Javier Vicente Wanchope Watson (born 10 August 1968) is a former Costa Rican football striker, who played most of his career with Deportivo Saprissa. He is the current manager of Panamanian club Atlético Chiriquí.

He was the second famous Wanchope soccer player to emerge in Costa Rica, after his dad Vicente, who played in the 1950s and 1960 with Herediano and Limonense. His younger brother is international soccer forward Paulo Wanchope, and his uncle is current coach and former player Carlos Watson.

== Club career ==
Javier began his career with Herediano, a team where all his soccer playing family members have played. He was transferred to Club Nacional de Football, where he played for 2 years in the Primera Division Uruguaya. He also played for Defensor Sporting. His style of playing was similar to his brother Paulo's, and was projecting himself to a successful international career when a knee injury cut his career short, and almost ended it before it even started. He returned to his country to play with Deportivo Saprissa, where he won two national championships, as well as two CONCACAF Champions Cups. He was an excellent scorer for Saprissa. He later had spells at Carmelita and Guatemalan side Suchitepéquez before finishing his career at Santa Bárbara.

== International career ==
He played with his national team, during two World Cup qualifiers, and was part of the 1985 FIFA U-16 World Championship held in China, the first FIFA World Cup tournament where Costa Rica ever appeared.

== Managerial career ==
After retiring, Wanchope became manager at second division El Roble and assistant manager at Herediano in 2010 alongside Marvin Obando. In summer 2011 he took charge of Turrialba.

=== Panama ===
He became coach of the Panama national under-20 football team in April 2012 and in June 2013 took the reins at Panamanian outfit Atlético Chiriquí after "Cholito" Méndez resigned. With Chiriquí he won promotion to Panama's top tier in 2014.

== Career statistics ==
=== International ===
Appearances and goals by national team and year
National team	Year	Apps	Goals
Costa Rica	1989	4	0
Costa Rica	1990	–	
Costa Rica	1991	2	0
Costa Rica	1992	–	
Costa Rica	1993	–	
Costa Rica	1994	–	
Costa Rica	1995	–	
Costa Rica	1996	5	0
Total		11	0
