= Miguel Ardiman =

Chilean footballer (born 1967)

Personal information
- Full name: Guillermo Miguel Ardiman Ramírez
- Date of birth: 10 June 1967 (age 59)
- Place of birth: Concepción, Chile
- Height: 1.83 m (6 ft 0 in)
- Positions: Right-back; central defender

Youth career
- Enacar
- Deportes Concepción

Senior career*
Years	Team	Apps	(Gls)
1984–1991	Deportes Concepción		
1992–1993	O'Higgins		
1994–1996	Universidad Católica		
1997–1998	Santiago Wanderers		
1999–2001	Coquimbo Unido		
2002	Deportes Iquique		
2003	Fernández Vial		

International career
1987	Chile B		
1994–1996	Chile	7	(0)

Managerial career
- 2019–: San Pedro de La Paz
Medal record
Men's football
Representing Chile
Pan American Games
Silver medal – second place	1987 Indianapolis	Team
- * Club domestic league appearances and goals

Guillermo Miguel Ardiman Ramírez (born 10 June 1967) is a Chilean football manager and former player who played as a defender.

== Club career ==
Ardiman served as a right-back at Deportes Concepción, and as a central defender at O'Higgins, Universidad Católica, Santiago Wanderers, Coquimbo Unido, Deportes Iquique and Fernández Vial. With Universidad Católica he won the international title of the Copa Interamericana in 1993, scoring a goal in extra time in the final. He also won the Copa Chile in 1995 with the same team.

== International career ==
Ardiman was a member of the Chile squad that won the silver medal in the 1987 Pan American Games.

== Honours ==
Universidad Católica

- Copa Interamericana: 1993
- Copa Chile: 1995

Chile B

- Pan American Games Silver medal: 1987
