= Dos Pinos =

Cooperativa de Productores de Leche Dos Pinos R.L.

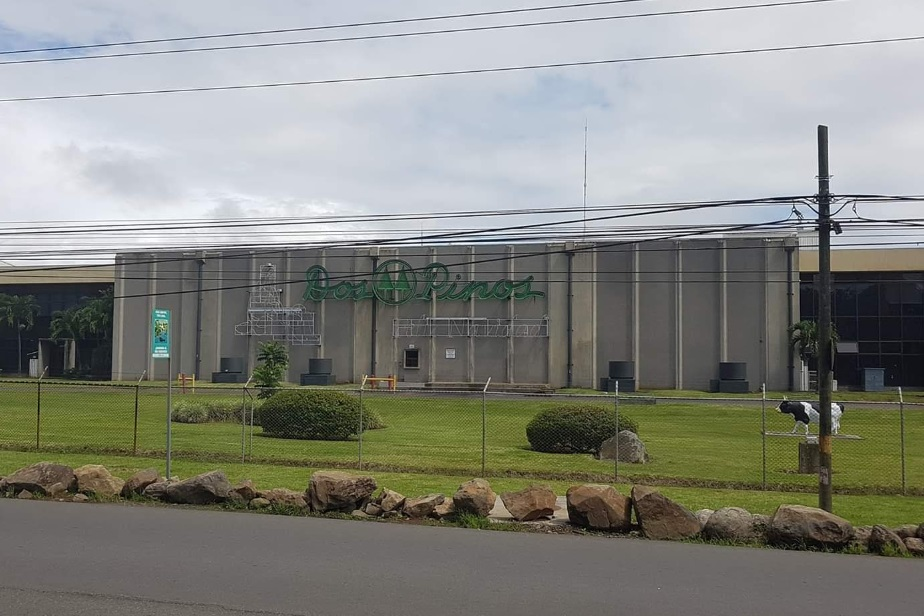
- Company type: Cooperative
- Industry: Food processing
- Founded: 1947
- Headquarters: Alajuela, Costa Rica
- Key people: Gonzalo Chavez (CEO), José Alberto Arguello Rodríguez (President)
- Products: Milk and dairy products, fruit juice, tea, and candy.
- Revenue: US$ 1.1 billion dollars (2017)
- Number of employees: 5600 (2021)
- Website: dospinos.com

Cooperativa de Productores de Leche Dos Pinos R.L (abbreviated as COOPROLE R.L. but more popularly known as “Dos Pinos”) is a Costa Rican cooperative producer of dairy, beverages, and candy products headquartered in Alajuela, Costa Rica. It has a brand portfolio of over 600 brands and its products are sold throughout Central America and the Caribbean.

Dos Pinos is structured as cooperative where partners who invested in the organization share in the profits according to their shares. It is regulated by Costa Rican law under the "Ley general de cooperativas".

== Origins ==
Cooperativa de Productores de Leche R.L. (popularly known as “Dos Pinos”) was founded in 1947 by a group of 25 dairy farmers from Costa Rica seeking to unite in order to have a stable plant through which they could sell their milk due to the issues with the fluctuation of demand on a product that is perishable.

This initial phase of the business of Dos Pinos was successful but it was not until 1952 that it enters the business of processing and pasteurization of milk. In these initial years the cooperative was forced to diversify its business because milk prices were regulated in Costa Rica which limited the profitability of the business. The cooperative decided to focus then on the “noble products” (dairy derivatives) which helped its bottom line and helped it expand its number of processing plants. In 1978 Dos Pinos opened a large powdered milk plant in Ciudad Quesada allowing it to better process milk from the northern part of the country. In 1982 it was reported that the company had 10 operating plants in Costa Rica. In 1985 Dos Pinos opened its dairy aseptic filling plant using Tetra Brik packaging which allowed it to introduce longer lasting milk into the market. In 1988 the firm completed its first formal export order abroad opening itself to selling to nearby countries.

== Expansion ==
In 2007 it opened its operations in Guatemala by building a large distribution center and setting aside space for a future processing plant. In 2008 through an alliance with Cooleche Dos Pinos branded milk started being sold in Panama; also in 2013 the cooperative purchased Planta Nevada from "Cervecería Nacional de Panamá" which produces milk and juice beverages. In August 2015 Dos Pinos acquired the industrial products company “La Completa” in Chontales, Nicaragua in order to boost its presence in that country. In September 2016 Dos Pinos diversified its operations with the acquisition of the “Gallito” candy confectionary subsidiary from Mondelez International by $6.7 million dollars.

== Brands ==
Dairy Products:
- Pinito (powdered milk)
- Delactomy Milk
- Deligurt (liquid yogurt)
- Lula (flavored milk)
- Queso Crema (cream cheese)
- Natilla (sour cream)
Gallito Candy Products:
- Morenito
- Guayabita
- Milán
- Milán Menta
- Tapita
- Fresa
- Piña Colada
- Pie de limón
- Tapita Navideña
- Violetas
- Mentas
- Copetines
- Mini Tapita
- Tri-Tapita
Ice cream products
- Trits
- Vanilla-Strawberry-Lemon
- Milan
- Milan Menta
- Tapita
- Guayabita
- Mini Sandwich
Restaurants
- La Estación Dos Pinos
