= Enrique Rivers =

Costa Rican footballer (born 1961)

Personal information
- Full name: Enrique Rivers Gutiérrez
- Date of birth: January 4, 1961 (age 65)
- Place of birth: Limón, Costa Rica
- Height: 1.70 m (5 ft 7 in)
- Position: Midfielder

Senior career*
| Years | Team | Apps | (Gls) |
| 1978–1979 | Limonense | | |
| 1980–1984 | Saprissa | | |
| 1985 | Comunicaciones | | |
| 1985 | Guanacasteca | | |
| 1986 | Saprissa | | |
| 1987–1988 | Limonense | | (10) |
| 1990–1991 | Herediano | | |
| 1992–1993 | Limonense | | |

International career
| 1983–1989 | Costa Rica | 13 | (1) |

Managerial career
- 1995–1996: Belén (assistant)
- 1996–1997: Herediano (assistant)
- 1997–2000: Saprissa (assistant)
- 2000: Limonense
- 2001: Saprissa
- 2012–: Saprissa de Corazón
- * Club domestic league appearances and goals

Enrique Rivers Gutiérrez (born 4 January 1961) became one of the most famous Costa Rican football players during the 1980s.

== Club career ==
Rivers made his debut in the Costa Rica Primera División in 1978 with hometown club Limonense.

He played most of his career with Saprissa, as well as for Comunicaciones in Guatemala and Herediano. He retired in 1993.

== International career ==
Rivers made his debut for Costa Rica in a March 1983 friendly match against Mexico and he is mostly remembered for scoring the goal against Italy's national team during the 1984 Olympic Games held in Los Angeles. At that period of time, the Italians were the World Cup champions, and their defeat against Costa Rica was a historic event in the football world.

His final international was a May 1989 FIFA World Cup qualification match against Trinidad & Tobago.

== Managerial career ==
After retiring from professional football, Rivers was assistant to manager Alexandre Guimarães for five years at Belén, Herediano and Saprissa, where they won the 1998 and 1999 local championships. His first job in charge was at Limonense in 2000 and he was head coach of Deportivo Saprissa for a short period of time as well, but decided to focus on the coordinating tasks for Saprissa's minor league system, where he has been able to discover and recruit young kids and launch them into successful football careers. In December 2012 he was put in charge of Saprissa's reserve team, Saprissa de Corazón, in the second division.
