= Carlos Santana (footballer) =

Costa Rican footballer (born 1953)

Personal information
- Full name: Carlos Santana Morales
- Date of birth: 12 June 1953 (age 73)
- Position: Midfielder

Senior career*
Years	Team	Apps	(Gls)
1972–1984	Saprissa	419	

International career
- Costa Rica

Managerial career
- CS Uruguay
- 1996–1997: Belén
- 1999: Saprissa
- * Club domestic league appearances and goals

Carlos Santana Morales (born 12 June 1953) is considered one of the best Costa Rican football midfielders during the 1970s and 1980s.

== Club career ==
He played his entire career for Deportivo Saprissa, and was the team's captain for several seasons. Santana played in 419 league games for the club.

Santana helped Saprissa win 7 national titles during the 1970s and 1980s, and was part of the legendary Saprissa team that won 6 national championships in a row during the 1970s.

== International career ==
He played with Costa Rica's national team as well, and was the captain of the team that beat then 1982 FIFA World Cup champions Italy in the 1984 Olympics in Los Angeles.

== Managerial career ==
After his retirement, Santana briefly coached Saprissa, but was dismissed after 4 months in September 1999 and has worked with both Saprissa's minor league system, as well coaching several Costa Rican U-17 and U-20 national teams. He also managed second division Uruguay and Belén.

== Personal life ==
Santana's son Ariel is also a professional football player.
