= Alex Sánchez (footballer, born 1930) =

Costa Rican footballer (1930–2025)

Personal information
- Full name: Alex Sánchez Cruz
- Date of birth: July 20, 1930
- Place of birth: Naranjo, Costa Rica
- Date of death: December 5, 2025 (aged 95)
- Position: Wing-back

Youth career
- 1940–1946: Saprissa
- 1946–1947: Orión
- 1947–1948: Saprissa

Senior career*
Years	Team	Apps	(Gls)
1949–1960	Saprissa		
1960–1963	Alajuelense		

International career
1950–1963	Costa Rica	32	(0)
- * Club domestic league appearances and goals

Alex Sánchez Cruz (July 20, 1930 – December 5, 2025) was a Costa Rican footballer who played as a wing-back.

== Early life ==
Sánchez was born in Naranjo in Costa Rica's Alajuela province. Sánchez started his soccer career at the early age of 10 playing in the Minor League for the Deportivo Saprissa. He started by training twice a day with the club and soon advanced to playing full-time. In 1945, he started in the first ever National Youth Championship, where he won a national title for the first time in his career.

== Club career ==
By 1946, Saprissa had ascended to the Juvenile Division and Sánchez had become the starting goalkeeper. Saprissa won the Championship in the new division by beating the Liga Deportiva Alajuelense in a best-of-three series. The Championship allowed the Deportivo Saprissa, the Minor League branch of a Major League team named Orion F.C., to ascend to the Major Division. The team was renamed Orion F.C., and Sánchez was moved into the position of left wingback. He remained in this position until his retirement.

In 1947, Sánchez played in the Third Division for the newly renamed Orion F.C. and again was part of the team that won the Championship. This continued success prompted Ricardo Saprissa, the team's co-founder and namesake, to register the team in the Third Division of the Major League. That same year the Orion F.C. won the Championship, thus advancing to the Second Division, where the team was renamed back to the Deportivo Saprissa. The next season, the Deportivo Saprissa advanced one last time to the Primera Division, Costa Rica's top soccer league. Sánchez was part of the team that won the first three National Championships in Costa Rica's top league in 1952, 1953 and 1957.

== International career ==
By 1950, Sánchez had earned a spot on the Costa Rica national team. His debut was in the VI Juegos Centroamericanos y del Caribe played in Guatemala. In 1951, he was called once again to play for the National Team at the 1951 Pan American Games, in Argentina where they finished in second place. Sánchez started for the national team in Honduras in 1955, where it would go to finish the tournament undefeated.

In 1956, Sánchez played with the Costa Rica national team at the third and last edition of the invitational Pan American Championship held in Mexico. During just one game he played in three different positions: left wingback, right wingback, and centre back. His versatility earned him the Most Valuable Player trophy.

In 1958, Sánchez participated in the qualifying matches for the 1958 FIFA World Cup held in Sweden. Costa Rica lost a best-of-two series against Mexico, and missed the chance to go on to participate in the FIFA World Cup. He earned a total of 32 caps, scoring no goals.

== Highlights ==
- Costa Rica National Championship in 1952, 1953, and 1957 with the Deportivo Saprissa.
- Champion at the Juegos Centroamericanos y del Caribe in 1955, 1959 and 1963 with the Costa Rica National Team.
- Second place at the Pan American Games (Buenos Aires 1951) and third place at the Pan American Championship (Mexico City 1956) with the Costa Rica National Team.
- World Soccer Tour in 1959 with the Deportivo Saprissa visiting Curaçao, Aruba, Venezuela, Portugal, the Netherlands, Austria, Italy, Israel, Thailand, Vietnam, Hong Kong, Philippines, Indonesia, Australia, New Zealand, Fiji, Hawaii, United States, and Mexico. The tour totaled 22 games and the Deportivo Saprissa finished the tour with a 14–1–7 record.
- Part of the Chaparritos de Oro. The nickname was coined by the Mexican press.

== Personal life and death ==
Sánchez married Sara Arroyo in March 1953. The couple had four children and 10 grandchildren. He resided in San José, Costa Rica, and died on December 5, 2025, at the age of 95.
