= Carlos Watson (footballer) =

Costa Rican football player (born 1951)

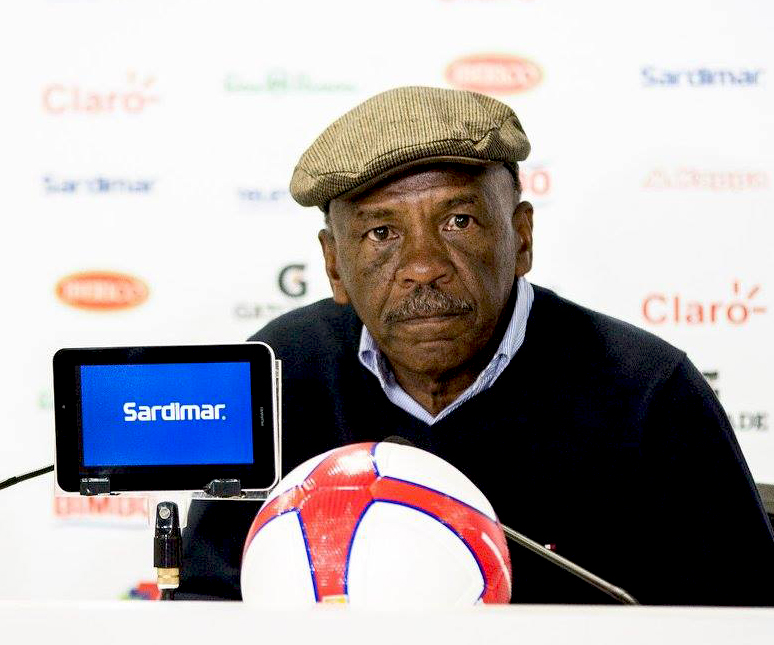

Personal information
- Full name: Carlos Enrique Watson Simes
- Date of birth: November 22, 1951 (age 74)
- Place of birth: Limón, Costa Rica

Youth career
- Cieneguita
- Colegio Nocturno de Limón

Senior career*
Years	Team	Apps	(Gls)
1978–1979	Herediano		
- Yuba Paniagua

Managerial career
- 1983–1984: Alajuelense
- Palmares
- 1992–1993: Carmelita
- 1993–1994: Saprissa
- 1996: Saprissa
- Turrialba
- 1998–2001: Costa Rica U20
- 2001–2002: Herediano
- 2006: Herediano
- 2012–2014: Uruguay de Coronado
- 2015–2017: Deportivo Saprissa
- * Club domestic league appearances and goals

Carlos Enrique Watson Simes (born November 22, 1951) is a Costa Rican former footballer and most recently manager of Deportivo Saprissa.

== Playing career ==
Watson played for his hometown team Limón and was then transferred to Herediano, where he won three national titles during the 70s.

== Managerial career ==
His career as a coach is much more notable, as he has been the coach for Costa Rica's three most important teams, Deportivo Saprissa, Herediano and Alajuelense. With Saprissa he won the CONCACAF Champions Cup in 1993 and with Alajuelense he won two national championships, in 1983 and 1984.

Watson is known in his country more as an excellent coach for minor leagues than everything else. For instance, as General Manager for Saprissa's minor leagues in the mid-1990s, he discovered an excellent generation of players that are still playing football in Costa Rica, some as internationals. He then took over the job as coach for Costa Rica's U-20 national team, with whom he went on to participate in two Football World Youth Championships. The first one was held at Nigeria in 1999 and the second one in Argentina in 2001, taking the team to the second round in both tournaments. From those teams, Costa Rican players such Gilberto Martínez, Winston Parks, José Luis López Ramírez, Pablo Brenes, Michael Umaña, Carlos Hernández among others, made their first appearances as internationals.

In 2007, Watson stood down at Herediano to act as a football consultant. In September 2012, he took over at Uruguay de Coronado replacing Randall Chacón. He resigned from his post in November 2014.

== Personal life ==
Watson is married to Adilia Muñoz Murillo and they have a son and a daughter. He is an uncle of one of Costa Rica's most famous football players, Paulo Wanchope.
