= Víctor Cordero =

Costa Rican footballer (born 1973)

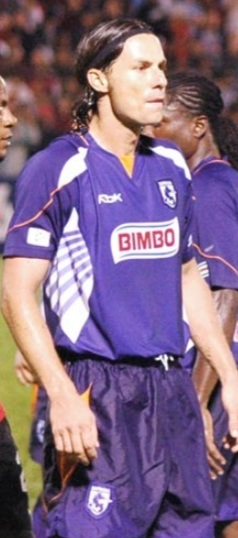
- Cordero with Saprissa in 2006

Personal information
- Full name: Víctor Cordero Flores
- Date of birth: 9 November 1973 (age 52)
- Place of birth: San José, Costa Rica
- Height: 1.83 m (6 ft 0 in)
- Position: Defender

Youth career
- Saprissa

Senior career*
Years	Team	Apps	(Gls)
1991–2011	Saprissa	478	(27)

International career
1995–2008	Costa Rica	51	(0)
- * Club domestic league appearances and goals

Víctor Cordero Flores (born 9 November 1973) is a retired Costa Rican football player, who has played for Saprissa of the Costa Rican first division.

== Club career ==
Cordero made his debut for Saprissa on 1 September 1991 against Limón, coming on as a sub for Alexandre Guimarães and scored his first goal on 29 December 1996 against Cartaginés. He has played his entire career for Saprissa, with whom he has won 11 national championships and three CONCACAF Champions' Cup, and was part of the team that played the 2005 FIFA Club World Championship Toyota Cup, where Saprissa finished third behind São Paulo and Liverpool

He is one of the most title-winning soccer players in Costa Rica's and Saprissa's history, as well as one of Costa Rica's players with most seasons playing under one single team, with 20 straight seasons with Saprissa. He played 478 league games for Saprissa, second to Evaristo Coronado on Saprissa's all-time appearances list.

In May 2011, Cordero announced his retirement from the game.

== International ==
He made his debut for Costa Rica in a September 1995 friendly match against Jamaica and earned a total of 51 caps, scoring no goals. He represented his country in 5 FIFA World Cup qualification matches and played at the 1999 and 2007 UNCAF Nations Cups as well as at the 2000, 2005 and 2007 CONCACAF Gold Cups.

His final international was a June 2008 FIFA World Cup qualification against Grenada.

== Personal life ==
Cordero is married to Sigrid González and they have three sons, Ariel, Julen and Thiago.

== Honours ==
=== National ===
- Primera División de Costa Rica: 11 Titles

1993–94, 1994–95, 1997–98, 1998–99, 2003–04, 2005–06, 2006–07, 2007 Apertura, 2008 Clausura, 2008 Apertura, 2010 Clausura

=== International ===
- CONCACAF Champions' Cup: 3

1993, 1995, 2005

- Copa Interclubes UNCAF: 2

1998, 2003

- UNCAF Nations Cup: 1

1999
