= Mario Cordero =

Costa Rican footballer (1930-2002)

Personal information
- Full name: Mario Cordero Brenes
- Date of birth: 7 April 1930
- Place of birth: San José, Costa Rica
- Date of death: 10 July 2002 (aged 72)
- Place of death: San José, Costa Rica
- Position: Defender

Senior career*
Years	Team	Apps	(Gls)
1949–1951	Saprissa		
1951–1952	Marte		
1952–1964	Saprissa		

International career
1950–1963	Costa Rica	41	(7)

Managerial career
- 1964–1967: Saprissa
- 1965: Costa Rica
- 1968–1970: Saprissa
- 1980: Saprissa
- * Club domestic league appearances and goals

Mario Cordero Brenes (7 April 1930 – 10 July 2002) was a Costa Rican football player and coach; he is still considered in his country as one of the top defenders to have played the game.

== Club career ==
Better known as Catato or Piernas de Oro, he was part of the Deportivo Saprissa team that embarked on a World Tour in 1959, becoming the first Latin American team to do so. Catato was the leader and captain of Deportivo Saprissa during the 1950s and early 1960s. He spent one season in the Mexican league, with Atletico Marte. He retired after a match against the Argentinian team Banfield on 25 December 1964. Catato is remembered for his sportsmanship on and off the field, as well as his excellent positioning, powerful shoot and defensive reliability.

== International career ==
During those years, he played the same role in the Costa Rica national football team, making 41 appearances.

== Managerial career ==
As coach, Catato guided Saprissa to four national titles in the 1960s, adding up to the four he had won previously as a player. He also managed Costa Rica's national team.

== Death ==
He died of respiratory arrest on 10 July 2002 in the Rafael Angel Calderon Guardia Hospital in San José.
