= Marvin Rodríguez =

Costa Rican footballer (1934-2017)

Personal information
- Full name: Marvin Rodríguez Ramírez
- Date of birth: 26 November 1934
- Place of birth: San José, Costa Rica
- Date of death: 16 October 2017 (aged 82)
- Position: Midfielder

Senior career*
Years	Team	Apps	(Gls)
1952–1959	Saprissa		
1960	Alajuelense		
1961–1964	Municipal		
1965–1966	Saprissa		

International career
1955–1961	Costa Rica	43	(7)

Managerial career
- 1964–1965: Municipal
- 1968–1970: Cartaginés
- 1969: Costa Rica
- 1971–1976: Saprissa
- 1978: Aurora
- 1978–1980: Herediano
- 1981–1984: Real España
- 1984–1986: Puntarenas
- 1989: Costa Rica
- 1990–1991: FAS
- 1995–1996: Xelajú
- 1999–2000: Costa Rica
- * Club domestic league appearances and goals

Marvin Rodríguez Ramírez (26 November 1934 – 16 October 2017) was a Costa Rican football coach and midfielder.

He coached the Costa Rica national football team to its debut at the World Cup in 1990.

== Career ==
=== Club ===
Born in barrio Don Bosco, San José, Rodríguez was a local star playing for Deportivo Saprissa back in the 1950s and 1960s. He was part of the Saprissa team that went on a world tour in 1959, becoming the first Latin American team to do such a trip. He also played for Municipal of Guatemala between 1961 and 1964, where he became player-manager. He retired as a player with Saprissa in 1966 after breaking his ankle.

=== International ===
In addition to his club career, Rodríguez made 43 playing appearances for the Costa Rica national football team, scoring 7 goals. In the 1950s, he was part of the team known as Chaparritos de Oro, which against all odds won a silver medal at the Pan-American Games held in Buenos Aires. He represented his country in 14 FIFA World Cup qualification matches.

=== Managerial ===
As a coach, Rodríguez managed his former playing club Saprissa during different stints in the 1970s and early 1980s. He won four national championships coaching Saprissa in the 1970s, to add to the several championships that he had won previously with the team as a player. Most significantly, he led unfashionable Puntarenas to the 1986 league title. As of August 2013, he had coached 683 matches and won 6 Costa Rican league games.

In 1988, he coached Costa Rica's national squad, guiding the team to its first World Cup qualification. Despite such success, he did not coach the team during the 1990 World Cup finals, as Bora Milutinovic was assigned that duty by the Costa Rican Football Federation. Later, Rodríguez coached Municipal, Aurora and Xelajú in Guatemala, winning the national league title with each team as well.

== Personal life ==
Rodríguez was married to Flor de María Vega Durán until his death and they had 4 children together.

== Death ==
Rodríguez died on 16 October 2017.
