= Francisco Hernández (footballer, born 1949) =

Costa Rican footballer (1949–2019)

Personal information
- Full name: Francisco Hernández Ramírez
- Date of birth: 11 July 1949
- Place of birth: Costa Rica
- Date of death: 7 January 2019 (aged 69)
- Position: Striker

Youth career
- 1963–1967: Saprissa

Senior career*
| Years | Team | Apps | (Gls) |
| 1967–1983 | Saprissa | | |

International career
| 1967–1980 | Costa Rica | 31 | (5) |
- * Club domestic league appearances and goals

Francisco Hernández Ramírez (11 July 1949 – 7 January 2019) was a professional football player from Costa Rica.

== Club career ==
Hernández played during the 70s and 80s with Costa Rica's national team and for Saprissa, winning a total of eight titles with them, including the six consecutive championships won by Saprissa from 1972 to 1977, a record both in Costa Rica as well as in the Americas. His brother, Fernando Hernández, El Príncipe, played for Saprissa too. He retired on 27 November 1983.

== International career ==
Hernández played 31 matches for Costa Rica and scored 5 goals. He represented his country in two FIFA World Cup qualification matches and also played for Costa Rica at the 1980 Summer Olympics.

== Honours ==
Deportivo Saprissa

- Central American Club Championship (3): 1972, 1973, 1978
- Primera División de Costa Rica (8): 1969, 1972, 1973, 1974, 1975, 1976, 1977, 1982
- Costa Rican Cup (2): 1970, 1972
- Costa Rican Super Cup: 1976
