= Jorge Monge =

Costa Rican footballer (1938–2019)

Personal information
- Full name: Jorge Hernán Monge Mora
- Date of birth: February 14, 1938
- Place of birth: Desamparados, Costa Rica
- Date of death: November 28, 2019 (aged 81)
- Position: Striker

Youth career
- 1951–1953: Saprissa

Senior career*
Years	Team	Apps	(Gls)
1953–1967	Saprissa	136	(100)

International career
1955–1961	Costa Rica	26	(21)
- * Club domestic league appearances and goals

Jorge Hernán Monge Mora (14 February 1938 – 28 November 2019) was a Costa Rican football player, considered in his country as one of the top strikers ever to have played the game.

== Club career ==
Better known as Cuty, he debuted with Saprissa at the young age of 15. He was part of the Deportivo Saprissa team that went on a World Tour in 1959, becoming the first Latin American team to ever do such a trip. Cuty was the top goal scorer of Deportivo Saprissa during the 50s and beginnings of the 60s.

Cuty won a total of 6 Costa Rican national championships, and was the best goal scorer in several seasons. He still holds the Costa Rican record for most goals scored by a player in a single game, with 6, in 1958 against Club Sport La Libertad.

His career was cut short in 1968, when injuries caused by a car accident forced him to retire. He was only 30 when he quit the fields. He played 136 league games, scoring 93 goals for Saprissa.

== International career ==
During those years, he played the same role in Costa Rica's national squad, team where he played his first game being just 17 years old. In 27 matches, he scored 23 goals, and is still in the top 5 among the best scorers in the Costa Rica national football team. He played in the qualifying rounds of the 1962 FIFA World Cup and was part of the so-called Chaparritos de Oro team that ended 3rd in the 1956 Panamerican Championship.

== Legacy ==
The football stadium in his hometown of Desamparados was named in his honour.
