= Edgar Marín =

Costa Rican footballer (1943–2023)

Personal information
- Full name: Edgar Ceferino Marín Leví
- Date of birth: 22 May 1943
- Place of birth: Pueblo Nuevo, Costa Rica
- Date of death: 16 August 2023 (aged 80)
- Height: 1.65 m (5 ft 5 in)
- Position: Striker

Youth career
- 1956–1962: Saprissa

Senior career*
Years	Team	Apps	(Gls)
1962–1967	Saprissa		
1967–1968	Oakland Clippers	46	(12)
1969	Kansas City Spurs	0	(0)
1970–1979	Saprissa		

International career
1963–1976	Costa Rica	32	(4)
- * Club domestic league appearances and goals

Edgar Ceferino Marín Leví (22 May 1943 – 16 August 2023) was a Costa Rican professional footballer who played as a striker.

== Club career ==
Born in Pueblo Nuevo, Puntarenas, Marín made his league debut in 1962 for Deportivo Saprissa against Uruguay de Coronado and played for them until 1967 before moving to the NASL to play for the Oakland Clippers and Kansas City Spurs. He also failed tests for PEC Zwolle and Go Ahead Eagles in the Netherlands.

Marín won 12 Primera División de Costa Rica titles with Deportivo Saprissa during the 1960s and 1970s. He won six consecutive titles from 1972 to 1977.

Marín retired in 1979.

== International career ==
Marín also represented Costa Rica at the international level, representing his country in 10 FIFA World Cup qualification matches. He won a total of 32 caps, scoring 4 goals.

== Death ==
Edgar Marín died on 16 August 2023, at the age of 80.
