= Enrique Díaz (footballer, born 1959) =

Costa Rican footballer

Personal information
- Full name: Enrique Alberto Díaz Harvey
- Date of birth: February 23, 1959 (age 67)
- Place of birth: Limón, Costa Rica
- Position: Left winger

Youth career
- Deportivo Güilo
- Deportivo Cavallini
- Saprissa

Senior career*
Years	Team	Apps	(Gls)
1977–1979	Limonense		
1979–1980	Ramonense		
1980–1982	Herediano		
1983–1996	Saprissa	444	
Total		676	(88)

International career
1979–1992	Costa Rica	52	(3)
- * Club domestic league appearances and goals

Enrique Alberto Díaz Harvey (born 23 February 1959) is a retired Costa Rican footballer. He is considered one of the best Costa Rican wingers of the 1980s, and one of the most recognized sports figures in his country.

== Club career ==
A speedy left winger, Díaz made his debut in the Costa Rican Primera División for his native Limonense on 17 April 1977 against Puntarenas, then played a year for Ramonense before joining Herediano in 1980, where he won the 1981 league title. He played most of his professional career for Saprissa, amassing 444 league games and helped them to win four national titles during the 1980s and 1990s, as well one CONCACAF Champions Cup in 1993.

He was known as El Zancudo ('leggy') on account of his very long legs. He played a total of 676 official games, scoring 88 goals. A testimonial game against Chilean side Universidad Católica to honor his retirement was suspended after the Chilean side's defender Raimundo Tupper committed suicide a few days before the game in San José.

== International career ==
Díaz made 52 appearances for the senior Costa Rica national football team from 1979 to 1992. He was part of the team that beat then 1982 FIFA World Cup champions Italy in the 1984 Olympics in Los Angeles. He also played with Costa Rica in 8 of the 1990 FIFA World Cup qualifiers, but was dropped by coach Bora Milutinovic from the team that played in the World Cup, alongside Evaristo Coronado and Álvaro Solano despite a national cry for his inclusion.

His final international was a December 1992 FIFA World Cup qualification match against Honduras.

== Retirement ==
Since his retirement in 1996, Enrique has worked with Saprissa's minor league system.

== Personal life ==
Díaz is divorced, has three children, and lives in Desamparados. His son, Junior Díaz, currently plays for Club Sport Herediano and Costa Rica's national squad.

Despite playing for both of their antagonists, Díaz has confessed that he is a LD Alajuelense supporter and that he always wished to play for the manudos during the 80s, however he also criticized then-club president Roberto Chacón as being a cheapskate who did not allow him to fulfill his dream.
