= Erick Lonnis =

Costa Rican footballer (born 1965)

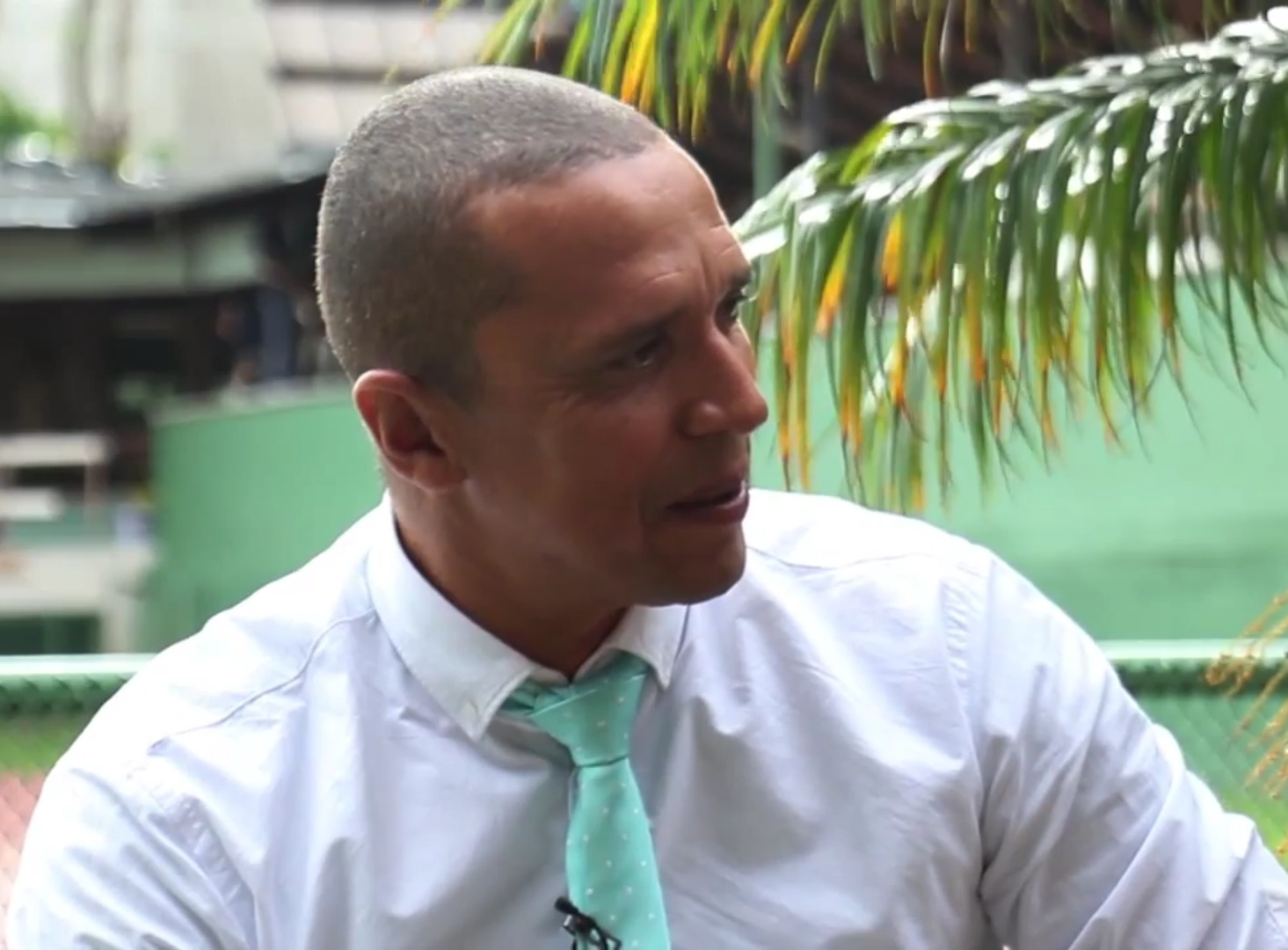
- Lonnis in 2013

Personal information
- Full name: Erick Lonnis Bolaños
- Date of birth: September 9, 1965 (age 61)
- Place of birth: San José, Costa Rica
- Height: 1.82 m (6 ft 0 in)
- Position: Goalkeeper

Senior career*
Years	Team	Apps	(Gls)
1985–1988	Turrialba		
1990–1991	Cartaginés	19	
1992–1993	Carmelita	63	
1993–2003	Saprissa	362	

International career
1992–2002	Costa Rica	76	(0)
- * Club domestic league appearances and goals

Erick Lonnis Bolaños (born 9 September 1965) is a Costa Rican former professional footballer who played as a goalkeeper during the 1990s and early 2000s.

== Club career ==
Lonnis made his debut in the Costa Rica Premier Division for Cartaginés on 22 July 1990 against Herediano and also played for Carmelita. He however played the majority of his career for Deportivo Saprissa, where he reached local stardom, becoming one of the most emblematic figures for the fans, either as Saprissa's or Costa Rica's national squad goalkeeper. He was the captain for Saprissa during several seasons, where he won four national championships, as well as two CONCACAF Champions Cup in 1993 and 1995. He totalled 362 games for the club.

== International career ==
Lonnis made his debut for Costa Rica in a December 1992 FIFA World Cup qualification match against St Vincent & the Grenadines and earned a total of 76 caps, scoring no goals. He holds the record for the goalkeeper with the most appearances for the senior Costa Rica national football team. He represented his country in 9 FIFA World Cup qualifiers and was the captain of Costa Rica's team that played the 2002 FIFA World Cup held in Korea and Japan, where he reaffirmed the leadership and excellent reflexes that characterized him through all his career. He also played at the 1993, 1995, 1997, 1999 and 2001 UNCAF Nations Cups as well as at the 1993, 1998 and 2002 CONCACAF Gold Cups and the 1997 and 2001 Copa América tournaments.

His final international was the final 2002 World Cup match against Brazil.

== Retirement ==
After retiring in April 2003 due to injury, Lonnis became the assistant of Costa Rica's national squad, due to his vast experience as a player and his leadership. On May 7 officially turned down Carmelita's offer to be their head coach.

== Personal life ==
Lonnis married former beauty queen Tatiana Bolaños in 2002 but they later separated. However, their first child, daughter Isabella, was born in July 2013.
