= Roy Myers =

Costa Rican footballer (born 1969)

Personal information
- Full name: Roy Anthony Myers Francis
- Date of birth: April 13, 1969 (age 57)
- Place of birth: La Francia de Siquirres, Costa Rica
- Height: 1.84 m (6 ft 1/2 in)
- Position: Midfielder

Senior career*
Years	Team	Apps	(Gls)
1987–1991	Limonense	81	(15)
1991–1998	Saprissa	329	(31)
1992	→ Peñarol (loan)		
1996–1997	→ Pachuca (loan)	32	(4)
1997	→ Tolima (loan)		
1999	MetroStars	7	(0)
1999–2000	Los Angeles Galaxy	27	(4)
2000	MetroStars	17	(1)
2001	Saprissa	17	(5)
2001	MetroStars	3	(0)
2001–2002	Saprissa	12	(0)
2003	Herediano	17	(2)
2003	Cartaginés	11	(1)
2004	Santa Bárbara	4	(0)
2004-2005	Fusión Tibás	?	(?)

International career
1990–2000	Costa Rica	48	(2)

Managerial career
- 2009–2010: Saprissa
- 2011–2012: Costa Rica U20 (assistant)
- * Club domestic league appearances and goals

Roy Anthony Myers Francis (born April 13, 1969 in La Francia de Siquirres) is a Costa Rican former football player who played most of his career with Deportivo Saprissa.

== Club career ==
Myers was known as El Maravilloso (The Marvellous) due to his natural talent to play the game, becoming a typical number 10. He made his professional debut for hometown club Limonense but in his country he played mostly with Saprissa, winning three national championships with them, as well as two CONCACAF Champions Cups. During his time with Saprissa, Myers was once suspended for 7 matches after insulting the referee and refusing to leave the pitch. He had several spells abroad, playing in Uruguay with Peñarol in an injury-hit 1992, Pachuca of Mexico in the mid 1990s, Tolima of Colombia in 1997 and later in Major League Soccer, where he played with the MetroStars and the Los Angeles Galaxy.

He finished his career at Cartaginés, where he was suspended for two matches and handed a fine for pushing a referee when three teammates were fined as well.

== International career ==
Myers made his debut for Costa Rica in a June 1990 FIFA World Cup match against Brazil and earned a total of 48 caps, scoring 2 goals. He represented his country in 8 FIFA World Cup qualification matches and played at the 1990 FIFA World Cup held in Italy. He also played at the 1993, 1995 and 1999 UNCAF Nations Cups as well as at the 1993 and 1998 CONCACAF Gold Cups and the 1997 Copa América.

He collected his final cap in September 2000 in a World Cup qualifier against Barbados .

=== International goals ===
Scores and results list Costa Rica's goal tally first.

N.	Date	Venue	Opponent	Score	Result	Competition
1.	11 July 1993	Estadio Azteca, Mexico City, Mexico	Canada	1–1	1–1	1993 CONCACAF Gold Cup
2.	18 July 1993	Estadio Azteca, Mexico City, Mexico	Martinique	1–0	3–1	1993 CONCACAF Gold Cup

== Managerial career ==
Myers became interim coach at Saprissa on 12 November 2009 but was fired in November 2010. In December 2011 he became assistant at the Costa Rica national under-20 football team.

== Personal life ==
Myers' brother Michael Myers also played professionally and made it to the national team. Roy is married to Rogena McCook and they have two children.
