= Deportivo Saprissa =

Association football club in San José

Saprissa
- Full name: Deportivo Saprissa, SAD
- Nicknames: Los Morados (The Maroon Ones); El Monstruo (The Monster); La S (The S); El Glorioso (The Glorious); El Sapri (The Sapri); Rey de Copas (King of Cups) El Equipo del Siglo (Team of the Century)
- Founded: 16 July 1935; 91 years ago
- Ground: Estadio Ricardo Saprissa Aymá
- Capacity: 23,112
- Owner: Horizonte Morado
- Chairman: Roberto Artavia
- Manager: Erick Lonnis Bolaños
- Coach: Hernán Medford
- League: Liga Promerica
- Apertura 2024: 1st (champions)
- Website: www.saprissa.com
Home colours	Away colours

Deportivo Saprissa is a Costa Rican sports club, mostly known for its football team. The club is based in San Juan de Tibás, San José, and play their home games at the Estadio Ricardo Saprissa Aymá. Their colours are burgundy and white. It is the main team representing the capital, but with the distinction of being massively followed throughout the whole country and overseas. The club was founded in 1935 and has competed in the Costa Rican first division since 1949. The name of the team comes from one of the club's main founders, Ricardo Saprissa Aymá. One of the most popular nicknames for the team El Monstruo Morado (The Maroon Monster) can be traced back to 1987, when the Costa Rican newspaper Diario Extra gave the team the nickname during a derby, because of the club's enormous following. A reporter commented that the sea of fans in the stands at the Estadio Ricardo Saprissa Aymá in Tibás wearing purple, and the tremendous noise they were generating, made him feel like he was "in the presence of a thousand headed monster". Saprissa immediately adopted the nickname El Monstruo Morado. It remains the most lauded football team in the whole region.

Saprissa has won 40 Primera División de Costa Rica championships, including six consecutive national titles in the 70s. It stands as one of the more successful teams in the CONCACAF region as well, having won the CONCACAF Champions' Cup three times – in 1993, 1995, and 2005. Saprissa has also won five Central American crowns in 1972, 1973, 1978, 1998, and 2003.

For the period 1 September 2007 to 31 August 2008 the club was ranked the 106th best team in the world by the International Federation of Football History & Statistics, an organization recognized by FIFA.

Saprissa has regularly appeared in the CONCACAF Champions Cup finals in recent decades, with three first-place finishes and four runners-up finishes. One of the club's most notable moments came in 2005 when Saprissa became the second club in CONCACAF to finish third in the FIFA Club World Cup together with the Mexican club Necaxa who accomplished it in 2000 and were joined by two more Mexican clubs, in 2012 by C.F. Monterrey and in 2017 by C.F Pachuca.

The club was chosen by the IFFHS as the CONCACAF team of the 20th Century. This event gave Saprissa worldwide recognition. Their main partner is a Costa Rican Investment Consortium named Horizonte Morado (Purple Horizon), composed mainly of Juan Carlos Rojas Callán, Edgar Zurcher, and Televisora de Costa Rica.

== History ==
Deportivo Saprissa was founded on 16 July 1935, by Roberto Fernández who named his team after the man who sponsored their uniform, Don Ricardo Saprissa Aymá. The club entered the Costa Rican Third Division as Saprissa F.C. They were promoted to the Primera División de Costa Rica, making their debut in the top flight on 21 August 1949. That year Saprissa actually won the first final match against Gimnástica Española with 0–3 score, then lost the away game by 6–2 to be defeated again 2–1 in a third game. They were accepted in 1st category as a favor granted by the administrative entity of that time. One of the most notable achievement of their early years, was to win the third and second division titles undefeated. The club has remained in the Costa Rican top flight ever since.

=== Recent events ===
In 2003, the majority of the club's stock was bought by Mexican entrepreneur Jorge Vergara, the then owner of Mexican football club Club Deportivo Guadalajara and later owner of Major League Soccer club Chivas USA.

Saprissa won the 2005 CONCACAF Champions Cup, beating Mexican club UNAM in the final over two legs, in May 2005. This was the last time a Central American club won the Champions Cup.

As CONCACAF club champions they qualified for the 2005 FIFA Club World Championship, held in Japan in December 2005. They beat Australian club Sydney FC in the quarter-finals thanks to a goal by Christian Bolaños. In the semi-finals they were beaten 3–0 by English club Liverpool, who were the Champions League holders that year, making it the strongest team in Europe. In the third place match they beat Al Ittihad of Saudi Arabia 3–2. Álvaro Saborío scored two goals, and Rónald Gómez scored an astonishing free-kick final goal in the 89th minute to seal the win. After this "late goal" Costa Rican people start calling the late-game goal "La Saprihora" (The Sapritime) in honor to this late goal even though this event happened in 2005 people still using this name for most of the Saprissa goals scored after the minute 85. They finished the competition in third place behind São Paulo of Brazil and Liverpool. Saborío was joint top scorer, and Bolaños was awarded the Bronze Ball by FIFA as third best player of the championship out of 5 teams.

In 2008, Saprissa also reached the Champions Cup final, but lost to Pachuca. This was the last Central American appearance at the final.

In 2012, Saprissa inaugurated its 1st division female team.

== Team colours ==
Even though the original colours were red and white, the team is known by their purple-burgundy colour. Red and white were utilised very briefly, and Ricardo Saprissa's influence from the Polo Club of Barcelona had the team try red and blue instead, even though this is the origin of the colour used throughout all of its history. When the new kit for 1937 (red and blue) was being manufactured, some of the threads got mixed evenly along the sides of the jerseys, producing a type of purple, resembling a burgundy/maroon colour. This new colour went down well with everyone involved, it reflected class and originality, and it was selected as the team's official colour. It was decided that the team's shield would appear on the chest of the uniform, with a notable bold white letter "S".

Saprissa utilizes a purple/burgundy jersey with white and grey details, and white shorts with burgundy and grey details for home games. For away games, a white jersey with burgundy and grey details is used, and white shorts with burgundy and grey details.

== Kit history ==
=== Jersey Suppliers ===
Manufacturer	Period	Sponsor	Notes
	1935–1977		
	1978–1979	(Costa Rica) Olympo	
	1980–1981	(Japan) National	
(Costa Rica) Desport	1982–1985	(Germany) Bayer	
(Costa Rica) Desport	1986–1990	(United States) Coca-Cola	
(United Kingdom) Reebok	1990–1991	(United States) Coca-Cola	
(Mexico) Garcis	1992–1993	(United States) Coca-Cola	
(Costa Rica) Trooper	1993–1994	(United States) Coca-Cola	
(United States) Lanzera	1994	(United States) Coca-Cola	
(United Kingdom) Umbro	1995	(United States) Coca-Cola	
(Costa Rica) Medfsport	1995	(United States) Coca-Cola	
(Costa Rica) Medfsport	1996	(United States) Colgate	
(United Kingdom) Reebok	1996–1997	(United States) Colgate	
(United Kingdom) Reebok	1997–1998	(South Korea) LG	
(Costa Rica) Tropper	1998	(South Korea) LG	
(Germany) Adidas	1998–1999	(South Korea) LG	
(Mexico) Atletica	2000–2003	(South Korea) LG	
	2003–2004		
(United Kingdom) Reebok	2004–2006		
(United Kingdom) Reebok	2006–2011	(Mexico) Bimbo	
(Spain) Joma	2012–2013	(Mexico) Bimbo (United States) Papa John's	
(Spain) Joma	2014	(Mexico) Bimbo (Costa Rica) Ibérico	
(Italy) Kappa	2015–2016	(Mexico) Bimbo (Costa Rica) Ibérico	
(Italy) Kappa	2017–2018	(Mexico) Bimbo (China) Huawei	
(Italy) Kappa	2018–2019	(Costa Rica) Kölbi (China) Huawei	
(Italy) Kappa	2019	(Costa Rica) Kölbi (Costa Rica) Tío Pelón	
(Italy) Kappa	2020–2021	(Costa Rica) Kölbi (Costa Rica) BAC Credomatic	
(Italy) Kappa	2021–2022	(Costa Rica) BAC Credomatic (Costa Rica) Tropical	
(Italy) Kappa	2021–2022	(Costa Rica) Dos Pinos (United States) Gatorade	
(Italy) Kappa	2022–2023	(Costa Rica) BAC Credomatic (Costa Rica) LIBERTY	
(Italy) Kappa	2024	(Costa Rica) BAC Credomatic (United States) Johnny Rockets	
(Italy) Kappa	2024	(Costa Rica) Banco Nacional (United States) Mastercard	
(Italy) Kappa	2025	(United States) Burger King (Mexico) Omnilife	
(Italy) Kappa	2025	(Costa Rica) Dominos (Costa Rica) Monge	
(Italy) Kappa	2026	(Costa Rica) Grupo INS (Costa Rica) Medismart	
(Italy) Kappa	2026	(United States) Burger King (Costa Rica) FUTV	
(Italy) Kappa	2026	(Costa Rica) BAC Credomatic (England) Castrol	

== Stadium ==
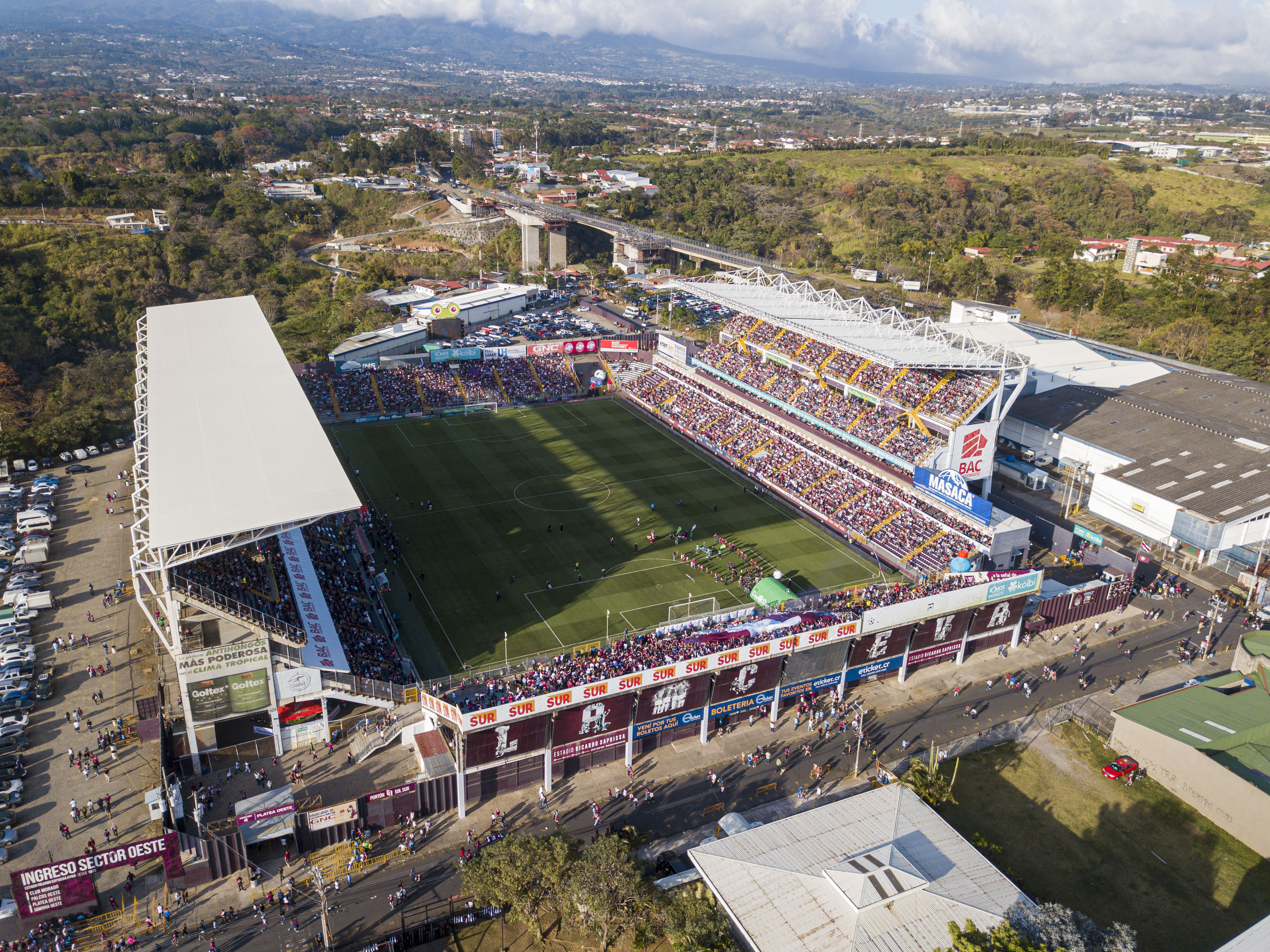
Saprissa Stadium packed before a Clasico

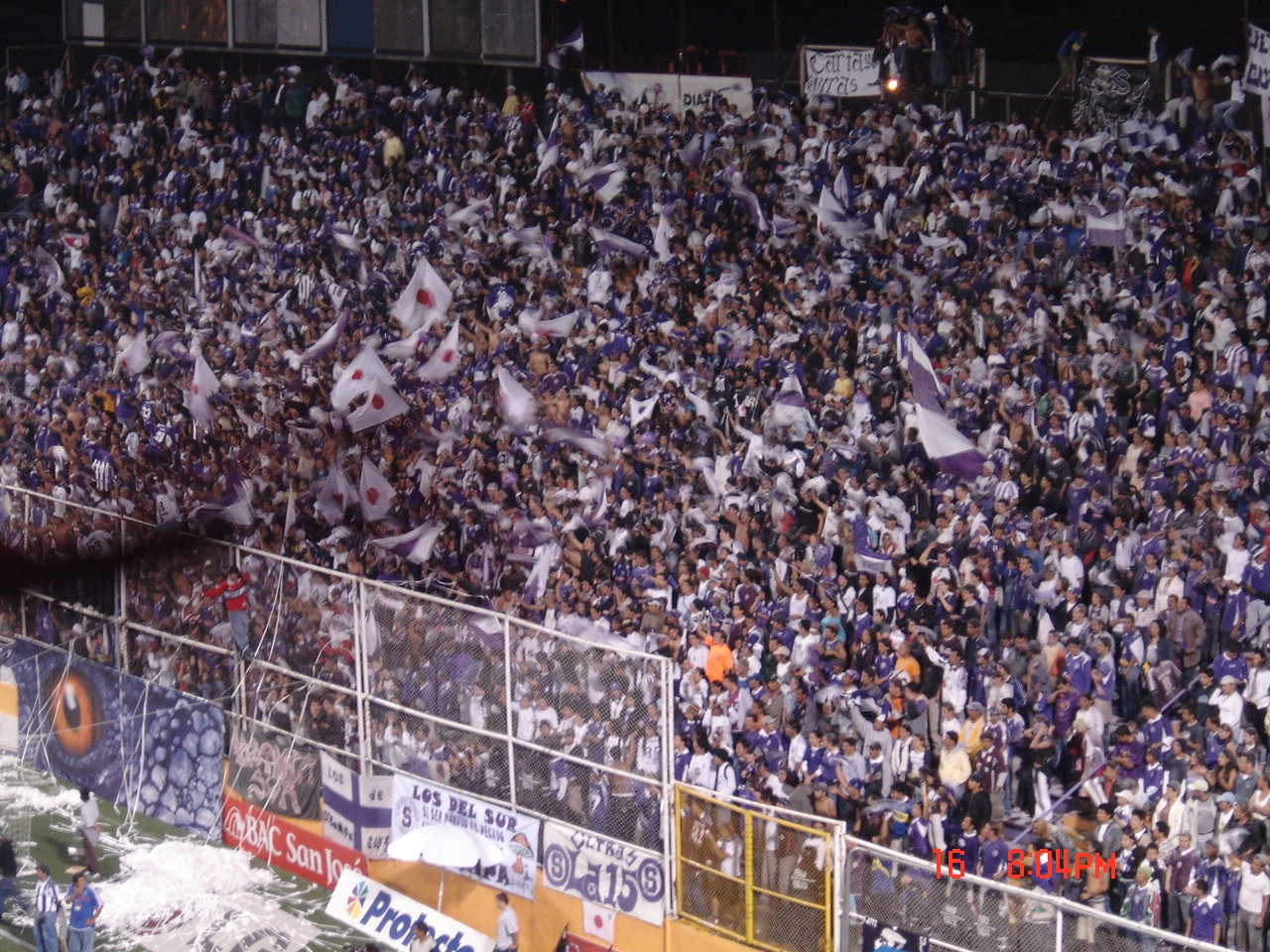
Fans of La Ultra Morada in La Cueva

Saprissa plays home games at the Estadio Ricardo Saprissa Aymá named after Ricardo Saprissa. They originally played at the Costa Rica National Stadium, which they rented and shared.

A new site for a stadium was bought in 1965 and on 27 August 1972 after six years of construction and upgrades, Estadio Ricardo Saprissa was officially opened. The first match was between Deportivo Saprissa and Comunicaciones of Guatemala. The match ended in a 1–1 draw with Peter Sandoval of Comunicaciones scoring the first goal at the new stadium.

The stadium is called Estadio Ricardo Saprissa Aymá, named after the founder of the club. There is a bust of Don Ricardo in one of the corners of the stadium. The stadium is also nicknamed La Cueva del Monstruo (The Monster's Cave/Lair) or La Cueva (The Lair), after the nickname of the club, El Monstruo Morado ("The Purple Monster"). It has a seating capacity of 24,000 and is overlooked by local mountains and downtown San Jose.

The stadium has great fame internationally, especially with all the national teams that play against Costa Rica.

The stadium celebrated its 50th anniversary in 2022, having hosted over 1,500 official matches.

== Supporters ==
La Ultra Morada (The Purple Ultra) is the club's most radical supporters group, even though it is not recognized as an official or formal part of the club. This group is always set on the south side of the stadium. La Ultra Morada is categorized as an "ultras group" or "ultras movement", being similar to what is more commonly known to outsiders as "hooligans"; even though members of La Ultra Morada, or simply La Ultra, emphasize their support for the club by creating a passionate atmosphere during matches. The group was the first Ultras group in Costa Rica, formed in 1995 when then-Saprissa president Enrique Artiñano brought fans from the Chilean football club Universidad Católica to help build a similar ultras group to their Los Cruzados for Saprissa. In the mid-to-late 1990s the Ultras began to develop the image of being football hooligans when violence began to break out with opposition fans during games. Due to the negative atmosphere and press coverage, Saprissa officials stepped in to restore order to a group that they had help create. The group is sub-divided in smaller groups called peñas. They maintain the style of a classic Ultras group, with chants, choreos, pyro shows (flares and gunpowder), abundant flags, giant banners, and the constant beat of an oversized bass drum.

There are, however, several different other supporter group that are legally recognized by the club. These groups occupy different zones in the stadium, and they are mainly groups that get organized with transportation, original merchandise, and massive displays for the team during a game (confetti, balloons, banners, flares, etc.)

== Mascot ==
The official mascot of the team is a cartoonish purple dragon, which was based on the Dragon Elliot from Pete's Dragon, and similar to one from Dragon Tales and many other dragons from children's shows. Because of this, many of the fans call the mascot Un monstruo amigable which means "a friendly monster". The mascot was meant to appeal to children in general, but it ended up being loved by the entirety of the fans. This caused it to be present in all kinds of paraphernalia and merchandise. It is the most recognizable and appreciated mascot in all the region. However, in early 2010, a new mascot was introduced. The mascot was designed in Mexico and many club supporters felt that it was a campy, superhero-like purple monster. As a result, the new mascot was highly rejected by the fans, claiming that "No queremos un dinosaurio super héroe, queremos al espíritu del equipo" (We don't want a super hero dinosaur, we want the original spirit of the team). The new mascot was replaced immediately after the strong rejection, and the team now has a new mascot that resembles the original. The new costume was manufactured by Fernando Thiel, a widely recognized Argentina-born puppeteer who lives in Costa Rica.

== Rivalries ==
=== El Clásico ===
When Deportivo Saprissa faces Alajuelense, it is known as El Clásico. Saprissa is the team from Tibás, in San José, while Alajuelense is from Alajuela. The first duel between these teams was on October 12, 1949, in a match where Alajuelense won by 6–5. The current score of victories is 139 for Saprissa, 107 for Alajuelense and 109 draws.

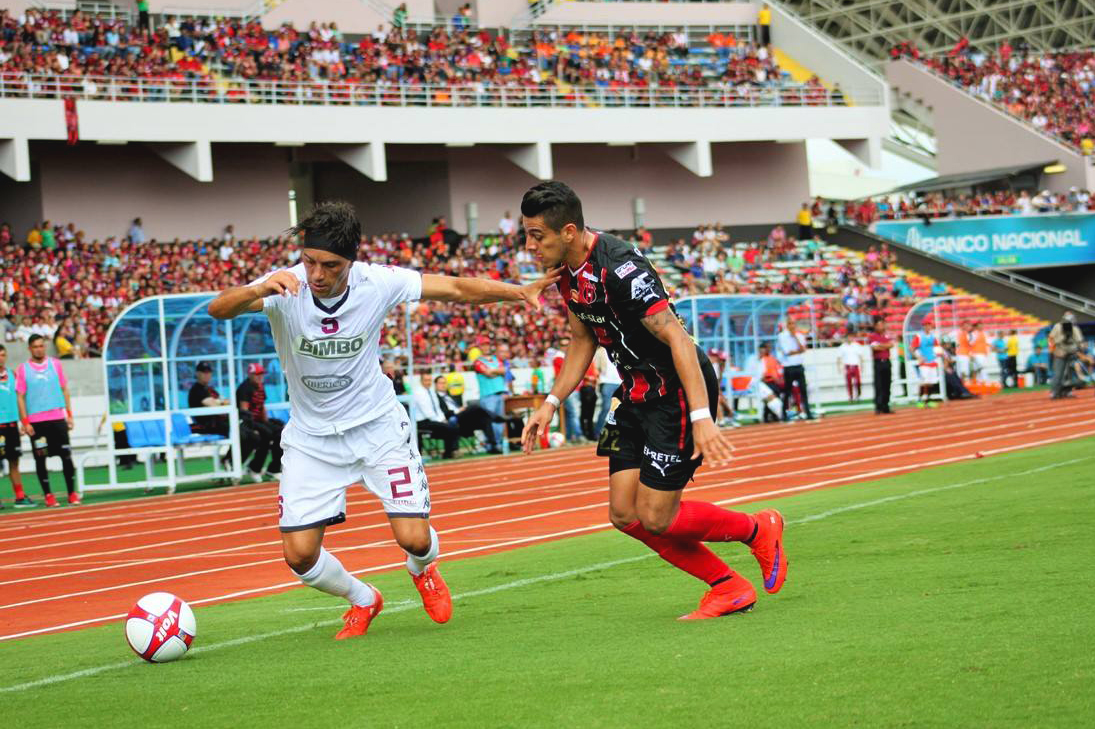
Christian Bolaños disputing the ball against Rónald Matarrita in 2015

== Honours ==
=== National ===
- Primera División de Costa Rica
  - Champions (40): 1952, 1953, 1957, 1962, 1964, 1965, 1967, 1968, 1969, 1972, 1973, 1974, 1975, 1976, 1977, 1982, 1988, 1989, 1993–94, 1994–95, 1997–98, 1998–99, 2003–04, 2005–06, 2006–07, Invierno 2007, Verano 2008, Invierno 2008, 2010 Verano, 2014 Verano, 2014 Invierno, 2015 Invierno, 2016 Invierno, Clausura 2018, Clausura 2020, Clausura 2021, Apertura 2022, Clausura 2023, Apertura 2023, Clausura 2024
  - Runners-up (19): 1950, 1956, 1958, 1959, 1961, 1963, 1966, 1970, 1971, 1984, 1991, 1992, 1996–97, 1999–00, 2002–03, Verano 2017, Apertura 2018, Clausura 2019, Apertura 2021
- Torneo de Copa de Costa Rica
  - Champions (8): 1950, 1956, 1960, 1963, 1970, 1972, 2013, 2026
  - Runners-up (7): 1953, 1954, 1961, 1963, 1967, 2014, 2023
- Supercopa de Costa Rica
  - Champions (4): 1963 (shared), 1976, 2021, 2023
  - Runners-up (2): 2020, 2024
- Segunda División de Costa Rica
  - Champions (1): 1948
- Tercera División de Costa Rica
  - Champions (1): 1947

=== International ===
==== Worldwide ====
- FIFA Club World Cup
  - Third place (1): 2005

==== Intercontinental ====
- Copa Interamericana
  - Runners-up (2): 1993, 1995

==== Continental ====
- CONCACAF Champions Cup
  - Champions (3): 1993, 1995, 2005
  - Runners-up (3): 1973, 2004, 2008
- CONCACAF League
  - Champions (1): 2019
  - Runners-up (1): 2020

==== Regional ====
- Copa Fraternidad/Torneo Grandes de Centroamérica/Copa Interclubes UNCAF
  - Champions (5): 1972, 1973, 1978, 1998, 2003
  - Runners-up (7): 1971, 1974, 1996, 1997, 2001, 2004, 2007

=== Friendly ===
- Torneo Relámpago de Fútbol de Costa Rica: 1949, 1957
- Copa Mayid Barzuna: 1954
- Trofeo Vuelta al Mundo: 1959
- Copa Ricardo Saprissa: 1982, 1989
- Copa Camel: 1985
- Copa 90 Minutos por la Vida: 1999, 2004, 2007, 2009, 2011

=== Awards ===
- CONCACAF League Fair Play
  - Winners (1): 2019

== Performance in CONCACAF competitions ==
- CONCACAF Champions Cup: 38 appearances

1963 – (bronze) Semi-finals
1965 – (Note: Saprissa actually qualified to the Final Round by winning the Central American Zone, but due to the Caribbean Zone's cancellation and no club entering the North American Zone, the tournament was cancelled and declared void.)
1969 – (bronze) Semi-finals
1970 – (bronze) Semi-finals (Note: Saprissa withdrew from the tournament at this stage.)
1971 – Second round
1973 – (silver) Runners-up
1974 – First round
1975 – (bronze) Semi-finals
1977 – (bronze) Semi-finals
1978 – Third round
1983 – First round
1986 – First round
1987 – Quarter-finals

1991 – Fourth round
1992 – First round
1993 – (gold) Champion
1995 – (gold) Champion
1996 – Second round
1998 – (bronze) Third place (Note: Unlike most other editions of the tournament, an actual Third Place Match was played.)
1999 – Quarter-finals
2002 – Round of 16
2004 – (silver) Runners-up
2005 – (gold) Champion
2006 – Semi-finals
2008 – (silver) Runners-up

2008–09 – Group stage
2009–10 – Group stage
2010–11 – (bronze) Semi-finals
2014–15 – Quarter-finals
2015–16 – Group stage
2016–17 – Quarter-finals
2018 – Round of 16
2019 – Round of 16
2020 – Round of 16
2021 – Round of 16
2022 – Round of 16

2024 – First Round
2025 – First Round

- CONCACAF Central American Cup: 3 appearances

2023 – Quarter-finals
2024 – Quarter-finals
2025 – Group stage

- CONCACAF League: 3 appearances

2019 – (gold) Champion
2020 – (silver) Runners-up
2021 – Quarter-finals

== Player records ==
Appearances
#	Name	Career	Apps	Goals
1	Evaristo Coronado	1981–95	537	148
2	Víctor Cordero	1991–11	478	
3	Jervis Drummond	1995–10	452	
4	Walter Centeno	1995–12	449	89
5	Enrique Díaz	1983–96	444	
6	Carlos Santana	1972–84	419	
7	Vladimir Quesada	1985–99	412	
8	Francisco Hernández	1967–83	401	74
9	Erick Lonnis	1993–03	362	
10	Heriberto Rojas	1963–77	336	

Goalscorers
#	Player	Career	Apps	Goals
1	Evaristo Coronado	1981–95	537	148
2	Edgar Marín			108
3	Eduardo Chavarría			104
4	Álvaro Saborío	2001–06, 2017	155	96
5	Jorge Monge	1953–67	136	93
6	Alonso Solís	1996–12		93
7	Walter Centeno	1995–12	449	89
8	Rodolfo Herrera			84
9	Víctor Ruíz			78
10	Francisco Hernández	1967–83	401	74

== Current squad ==
As of 21 August 2026

Note: Flags indicate national team as defined under FIFA eligibility rules; some limited exceptions apply. Players may hold more than one non-FIFA nationality.

No.	Pos.	Nation	Player
3	DF	CRC	Pablo Arboine
4	DF	CRC	Kendall Waston
5	DF	CRC	Joseph Mora
6	DF	CRC	Óscar Duarte
7	FW	PAN	Newton Williams (on loan from Antigua GFC)
8	MF	CRC	David Guzmán
10	MF	CRC	Jefferson Brenes
11	FW	NCA	Bancy Hernández (on loan from Real Estelí)
12	DF	CRC	Ricardo Blanco
13	GK	CRC	Isaac Alfaro
14	FW	CRC	Ariel Rodríguez
17	DF	CRC	Gerald Taylor
19	FW	CRC	Keyshwen Arboine
20	MF	ARG	Mariano Torres (captain)
21	DF	PAN	Fidel Escobar
22	DF	CRC	Jorkaeff Azofeifa

No.	Pos.	Nation	Player
23	FW	CUB	Luis Paradela
24	FW	CRC	Orlando Sinclair
25	MF	CRC	Sebastián Acuña
26	FW	CRC	Andrey Soto
27	DF	CRC	Samir Taylor
28	FW	CRC	Gerson Torres
31	MF	CRC	Sebastián Padilla
39	MF	CRC	Alberth Barahona
40	GK	CRC	Abraham Madriz
41	MF	CRC	Fabricio Urbina
42	DF	CRC	Julián González
48	DF	CRC	Thiago Cordero
49	FW	CRC	Johnny Myrie
50	MF	CRC	Mathias Elizondo
53	DF	CRC	José Carvajal

=== Out on loan ===
Note: Flags indicate national team as defined under FIFA eligibility rules; some limited exceptions apply. Players may hold more than one non-FIFA nationality.

No.	Pos.	Nation	Player
—	GK	CRC	Minor Álvarez (at Xelajú)

== Non-playing staff ==
Name	Role
(Costa Rica) Vladimir Quesada	Head coach
(Costa Rica)	Assistant coach
(Costa Rica)	Head Athletic Trainer
(Costa Rica) Róger Mora	Goalkeeping coach
(Costa Rica) Esteban Campos	Team Doctor
(Costa Rica) José Francisco Porras
(Costa Rica) Juan Gabriel Rodríguez

== List of coaches ==
- (Costa Rica) Roberto Fernández "Beto" (1936–47)
- (Costa Rica) José Francisco García "Pachico" (1947–50)
- (Brazil) Otto Bumbel (1951–53)
- (Costa Rica) José Francisco García "Pachico" (1953–55)
- (Costa Rica) Alfredo Piedra "Chato" (1955–56)
- (Argentina) Carlos Peucelle (1957–58)
- (Spain) Eduardo Viso Abella (1958–61)
- (Brazil) Jorge Thomas (1961)
- (Costa Rica) Alfredo Piedra "Chato" (1962–64)
- (Costa Rica) Mario Cordero "Catato" (1964–67)
- (Argentina) José Ramos Costa (1967)
- (Costa Rica) Mario Cordero "Catato" (1968–70)
- (Costa Rica) Marvin Rodríguez (1971–76)
- (Slovakia) Jozef Karel (1977–79)
- (Costa Rica) Giovanni Rodríguez (1979–80)
- (Brazil) Marcos Pavlovsky (1980)
- (Costa Rica) Mario Cordero "Catato" (1980)
- (Costa Rica) Wálter Elizondo (1981–82)
- (Costa Rica) Giovanni Rodríguez (1982–83)
- (Chile) Javier Mascaró (1983)
- (Uruguay) José Mattera (1984–85)
- (Costa Rica) Marvin Rodríguez (1985–86)
- (Peru) Walter Ormeño (1986)
- (Costa Rica) Rigoberto Rojas "Feo" (1986)
- (Costa Rica) Guillermo Hernández "Coco" (1986–87)
- (Uruguay) Raúl Higinio Bentancor (1987–88)
- (Czech Republic) Josef Bouska (1988–91)
- (Brazil) Odir Jacques (1991)
- (Costa Rica) Rolando Villalobos (1991–92)
- (Brazil) Odir Jacques (1992–93)
- (Italy) Fabrizio Poletti (1993)
- (Uruguay) Julio César Cortés "Pocho" (1993)
- (Costa Rica) Carlos Watson (1993–94)
- (Uruguay) Carlos Linaris (1994–95)
- (Colombia) Luis García "Chiqui" (1995–96)
- (Costa Rica) Carlos Watson (1996)
- (Argentina) Jorge Olguín (1996–97)
- (Costa Rica) Alexandre Guimarães (1997–99)
- (Costa Rica) Carlos Santana (1999)
- (Costa Rica) Jorge Flores (1999)
- (Costa Rica) Alexandre Guimarães (1999–00)
- (Peru) Miguel Company (2000)
- (Costa Rica) Jorge Flores (2000)
- (Brazil) Valdeir Vieira "Badú" (3 Nov 2000–01)
- (Costa Rica) Evaristo Coronado (2001)
- (Costa Rica) Enrique Rivers (2001)
- (Argentina) Patricio Hernández (2001–02)
- (Costa Rica) Vladimir Quesada (2002)
- (Uruguay) Manuel Keosseian (10 May 2002 – 30 June 2003)
- (Costa Rica) Hernán Medford (1 July 2003 – 30 October 2006)
- (Costa Rica) Jeaustin Campos (1 July 2007 – 2 November 2009)
- (Costa Rica) Roy Myers (1 Jan 2010 – 31 December 2010)
- (Mexico) Juan Manuel Álvarez (1 Jan 2011 – 30 June 2011)
- (Costa Rica) Alexandre Guimarães (1 July 2011 – 31 May 2012)
- (Uruguay) Daniel Casas (1 July 2012 – 31 December 2012)
- (Costa Rica) Rónald González Brenes (1 Jan 2013 – 30 September 2014)
- (Costa Rica) Jeaustin Campos (30 September 2014 – 17 September 2015)
- (Costa Rica) Douglas Sequeira (18 September 2015 – 15 October 2015)
- (Costa Rica) Carlos Watson (15 Oct 2015 – 17 December 2017)
- (Costa Rica) Vladimir Quesada (18 Dec 2017 – 3 February 2019)
- (Costa Rica) Walter Centeno (3 Feb 2019 – 7 February 2021)
- (Costa Rica) Roy Myers (8 Feb 2021 – 18 April 2021)
- (Costa Rica) Mauricio Wright (20 Apr 2021 – 9 November 2021)
- (Spain) Iñaki Alonso (10 Nov 2021 – 13 Jul 2022)
- (Costa Rica) Jeaustin Campos (14 July 2022 – March 28, 2023)
- (Costa Rica) Vladimir Quesada (30 March 2023 – 6 Oct 2024)
- (Argentina) José Giacone (7 Oct 2024 - 3 March 2025)
- (Costa Rica) Paulo Wanchope (5 March 2025 - 22 August 2025)
- (Costa Rica) Vladimir Quesada (22 August 2025 – 30 January 2026)
- (Costa Rica) Hernán Medford (2 February 2026 – )

== See also ==
- CONCACAF Champions Cup and Champions League records and statistics
- List of Deportivo Saprissa players
