= Evaristo Coronado =

Costa Rican footballer (born 1960)

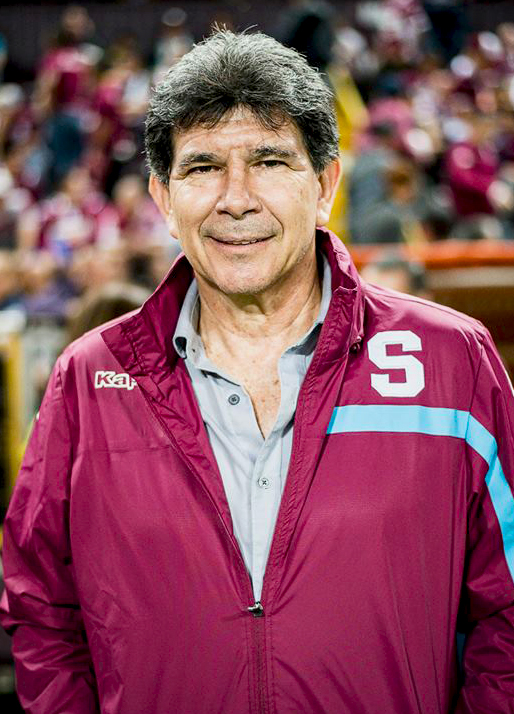

Personal information
- Full name: Evaristo Coronado Salas
- Date of birth: September 13, 1960 (age 66)
- Place of birth: Ciudad Cortés, Costa Rica
- Height: 1.80 m (5 ft 11 in)
- Position: Striker

Youth career
- Deportivo Saprissa

Senior career*
Years	Team	Apps	(Gls)
1981–1995	Deportivo Saprissa	537	(148)

International career
1983–1992	Costa Rica	52	(10)
- * Club domestic league appearances and goals

Evaristo Coronado Salas (born 13 September 1960) is considered the best Costa Rican football striker during the 1980s.

== Club career ==
Born in Ciudad Cortés, Coronado is one of the most recognized sports figures in his country. He played his entire career of 14 seasons for Deportivo Saprissa, where he holds the team record for most appearances made and goals scored ever. He made his debut on 3 May 1981 against Herediano and scored his first goal on 24 May 1981 against San Carlos. He scored a total of 148 league goals in 537 games dressed as a Morado (purple), the nickname of the Saprissa players. Coronado helped Saprissa win five national titles during the 1980s and 1990s, as well as two CONCACAF Champions Cups, in 1993 and 1995. Coronado topped the league's goalscoring charts twice in 1981 and 1988 and after his retirement, briefly coached the club. He retired on 27 August 1995 after a friendly game against Guatemalan side Comunicaciones.

He was known as El Caballero del Futbol (The Gentleman of Football), because of his style of playing the game, always very fair and respectful of his adversaries and referees, even before FIFA's Fair Game philosophy was enumerated. He was well known for never having received a red-card. Because of his goalscoring talents, mostly with his head, he was also referred to as Evagol.

== International career ==
He played with the Ticos as well, making his debut in 1983 and scored in the 1984 Olympics in Los Angeles. He was Costa Rica's top scorer in the 1990 FIFA World Cup qualifiers, but was dropped by coach Bora Milutinovic from the team that played in the World Cup, despite a national cry for his inclusion.

He totalled 52 caps, scoring 10 goals, and played his final international in a FIFA World Cup qualification game against Mexico on November 22, 1992.

== Personal life ==
He is married to Patricia Hernández and they have two children, Carla and Alexander.
