= List of Al Ain FC seasons =

Al Ain Football Club is an association football club based in Al Ain, Abu Dhabi, that competes in UAE Pro League, the top-division football league in United Arab Emirates. Founded in 1968 by players from Al Ain, members of a Bahraini group of exchange students and the Sudanese community working in the United Arab Emirates. Al Ain is one of only three clubs never to have been relegated from the top level of Emirati football since 1975–76 season, the others being Al Nasr and Al Wasl.

== Key ==
- Pos. = Position
- Div. = Division
- C = Champion
- RU = Final (Runner-up)
- SF = Semi-finals
- QF = Quarter-finals
- R16/R32 = Round of 16, round of 32, etc.
- R1/R2 = First round, second round, etc.
- GS = Group stage
- PO = Play-off
- QS = Qualifying Stage
- LS = League stage
- W = Withdrew

Champions	Runners-up	3rd Place	Advanced to next round but the cup continued in next season

== Seasons ==
=== Pre-Football League era ===
Season	Div.	Pos.	Cup		Manager
1969–70 (Note: from 1969 to 1974, Al Ain competed in the championship and Cup of the Abu Dhabi region organised by Abu Dhabi Football Association.)	Abu Dhabi Championship		Abu Dhabi Ruler Cup	Not held	(United Arab Emirates) Nasser Dhaen
1970–71	Abu Dhabi Championship		Abu Dhabi Ruler Cup	RU	(United Arab Emirates) Nasser Dhaen
1971–72	Abu Dhabi Championship	Not completed	Abu Dhabi Ruler Cup	RU	(Egypt) Abdelaziz Hammami
1972–73	Abu Dhabi Championship		Abu Dhabi Ruler Cup		(Egypt) Abdelaziz Hammami
1973–74	Abu Dhabi Championship	1st	Abu Dhabi Ruler Cup	Not held	(Syria) Ahmed Alyan
1974–75 (Note: Played as Categorization League and organised by UAEFA, included four clubs from Abu Dhabi region, Al Ain, Al Emirates qualified to 1975–76 UAE Football League, Al Jazira, Abu Dhabi to 1975–76 First Division League.)	Abu Dhabi Championship	1st	UAE President's Cup	R16	(Syria) Ahmed Alyan

=== Football League and Pro League era ===
Season	Div.	Pos.	Pl.	W	D	L	GS	GA	GD	P	President's Cup	Federation Cup / League Cup (Note: Starting from the 2008-09 season or whats known as the Pro Era, UAE Federation Cup was replaced with UAE League Cup.)	Super Cup	GCC		ACCC		Asia		Other competitions		Top scorer		Manager
1975–76	1	2nd	16	10	4	2	33	15	+18	24	Not completed	Not held						–		–				(Syria) Ahmed Alyan
1976–77	1	1st	3	2	1	0	6	3	+3	5	Quarter-finals	Not held						–		–		(Tunisia) Mohieddine Habita		(Tunisia) Humaid Dhib
1977–78	1	2nd	24	15	4	5	–			34	Cancelled	Not held						–		–				(Tunisia) Humaid Dhib
1978–79	1	3rd	20	–						27	RU	Not held						–		–				(Syria) Ahmed Alyan
1979–80	1	8th	18	3	6	9	28	40	−12	12	Semi-Finals	Not held						–		–				(Tunisia) Abdelmajid Chetali
1980–81	1	1st	18	10	4	4	24	22	+2	24	RU	Not held						–		–		(United Arab Emirates) Ahmed Abdullah		(Tunisia) Abdelmajid Chetali (Morocco) Ahmed Nagah*
1981–82	1	2nd	18	–						21	Quarter-finals	Not held				–		–		–				(Morocco) Ahmed Nagah
1982–83	1	5th	18	6	7	5	21	21	0	19	Quarter-finals	Not held		–		Not held		–		Joint League	C			(Brazil) Nelsinho Rosa
1983–84	1	1st	18	12	3	3	35	18	+17	27	Semi-Finals	Not held		–		–		–		–		(United Arab Emirates) Ahmed Abdullah		(Brazil) Nelsinho Rosa
1984–85	1	8th	–								Quarter-finals	Group Stage	Not held	Gulf Club Champions Cup	GS	–		–		Joint League	4th			(Brazil) Nelsinho Rosa (Socialist Federal Republic of Yugoslavia) Miljan Miljanić
1985–86	1	9th	18	4	2	12	27	47	−20	14	Semi-Finals	RU	Not held	–		–		–		–				(Brazil) Nelsinho Rosa (Socialist Federal Republic of Yugoslavia) Miljan Miljanić
1986–87	1	3rd	20	11	3	6	32	23	+9	25	Semi-Finals	Not held	Not held	–		–		–		–				(Brazil) Jair Picerni (Brazil) João Francisco
1987–88	1	5th	22	9	6	7	26	24	+2	33	Round of 16		Not held	–		–		–		–				(Brazil) João Francisco
1988–89	1	5th	22	8	9	5	29	21	+8	25	Quarter-finals	C	Not held	–		–		–		–				(Brazil) Zé Mario
1989–90	1	7th	26	9	9	8	36	26	+10	27	RU	Not held	–	Not held		Not held		–		–				(Brazil) Zé Mario
1990–91 (Note: cancelled due to Gulf War.)	1	8th	13	5	5	3	15	10	+5	15	Semi-Finals	Not held	Not held	–		cancelled (Note: cancelled due to Gulf War.)		–		–				(Algeria) Mahieddine Khalef
1991–92	1	7th	30	13	8	9	42	35	+7	34	Round of 16	Not held	Not held	–		–		–		–				(Algeria) Mahieddine Khalef
1992–93	1	1st	22	15	5	2	54	13	+41	35	Round of 16	Group Stage	–	–		–		–		–		(United Arab Emirates) Saif Sultan		(Egypt) Yusri Abdul Ghani (Brazil) Amarildo
1993–94	1	2nd	18	12	5	1	31	10	+21	29	RU	RU	RU	–		–		–		–				(Brazil) Amarildo
1994–95	1	2nd	18	7	9	2	26	15	+11	23	RU	–	1st	Gulf Club Champions Cup	5th	–		–		–				(Brazil) Amarildo (Egypt) Shaker Abdel-Fattah
1995–96	1	3rd	18	6	7	5	17	11	+6	25	Round of 16	Not held	4th	–		–		Asian Cup Winners' Cup	R2	–				(Argentina) Ángel Marcos
1996–97	1	5th	28	10	11	7	40	31	+9	41	Round of 16	Not held	Not held	–		–		–		–				(Brazil) Lori Sandri (Egypt) Yusri Abdul Ghani (Brazil) Cabralzinho
1997–98	1	1st	32	17	9	6	49	29	+20	61	Semi-Finals	Not held	Not held	–		–		–		–		(United Arab Emirates) Salem Johar		(Brazil) Cabralzinho (Egypt) Shaker Abdel-Fattah
1998–99	1	2nd	33	16	9	8	58	36	+22	57	C	Not held	Not held	–		–		Asian Club Championship	3rd	–		(Burkina Faso) Seydou Traoré	15	(Portugal) Nelo Vingada (Romania) Ilie Balaci
1999–2000	1	1st	22	13	7	2	48	25	+23	47	Round of 16	Group Stage	Not held	–		–		Asian Cup Winners' Cup	R1	–		(United Arab Emirates) Majid Al Owais	15	(Romania) Ilie Balaci
2000–01	1	4th	22	10	4	8	33	27	+6	34	C	Group Stage	Not held	Gulf Club Champions Cup	C	–		Asian Club Championship	R2	–		(Burundi) Juma Mossi	15	(Argentina) Oscar Fulloné (Tunisia) Mrad Mahjoub (United Arab Emirates) Ahmed Abdullah * (Romania) Anghel Iordănescu
2001–02	1	1st	22	14	5	3	44	23	+21	47	Semi-Finals	Group Stage	RU	–		Arab Club Champions Cup	W (Note: Al-Ain withdrew the tournament, Al-Rayyan replaced it.)	Asian Cup Winners' Cup	QF	–		(Ivory Coast) Joël Tiéhi	19	(Bosnia and Herzegovina) Džemal Hadžiabdić
2002–03	1	1st	22	14	6	2	51	20	+31	48	Quarter-finals	Not held	C	–		–		AFC Champions League	C	–		(Ivory Coast) Boubacar Sanogo	24	(France) Bruno Metsu
2003–04	1	1st	16	11	3	2	34	17	+17	36	Semi-Finals	Not held	Not held	Not held		–		AFC Champions League	bye GS (Note: bye through the Group Stage as the reigning champions)	–		(Brazil) Rodrigo Mendes	19	(France) Bruno Metsu
2004–05	1	2nd	26	18	3	5	54	26	+28	57	C	C	Not held	–		–				–				
2004–05	1	2nd	26	18	3	5	54	26	+28	57	C	C	Not held	–		–		AFC Champions League	QF	–		(Brazil) Edílson	22	(France) Alain Perrin (Tunisia) Mohammad El Mansi * (Czech Republic) Milan Máčala
2004–05	1	2nd	26	18	3	5	54	26	+28	57	C	C	Not held	–		–		AFC Champions League	QF	–		(Brazil) Edílson	22	(France) Alain Perrin (Tunisia) Mohammad El Mansi * (Czech Republic) Milan Máčala
2005–06	1	4th	22	13	2	7	42	23	+19	41	C	C	Not held	–		–				–				
2005–06	1	4th	22	13	2	7	42	23	+19	41	C	C	Not held	–		–		AFC Champions League	RU	–		(Serbia) Nenad Jestrović	14	(Czech Republic) Milan Máčala (Tunisia) Mohammad El Mansi *
2005–06	1	4th	22	13	2	7	42	23	+19	41	C	C	Not held	–		–		AFC Champions League	QF	–		(Serbia) Nenad Jestrović	14	(Czech Republic) Milan Máčala (Tunisia) Mohammad El Mansi *
2006–07	1	9th	22	7	7	8	22	26	−4	28	RU	Group Stage	Not held	–		–				–				
2006–07	1	9th	22	7	7	8	22	26	−4	28	RU	Group Stage	Not held	–		–		AFC Champions League	QF	–		(Serbia) Nenad Jestrović	9	(Romania) Anghel Iordănescu (Netherlands) Tiny Ruys * (Italy) Walter Zenga
2006–07	1	9th	22	7	7	8	22	26	−4	28	RU	Group Stage	Not held	–		–		AFC Champions League	GS	–		(Serbia) Nenad Jestrović	9	(Romania) Anghel Iordănescu (Netherlands) Tiny Ruys * (Italy) Walter Zenga
2007–08	1	6th	22	9	5	8	41	36	+5	32	Round of 16	Not held	Not held	–		–		–		–		(The Gambia) Ousman Jallow	11	(Brazil) Tite (Germany) Winfried Schäfer
2008–09	1	3rd	22	12	7	3	40	20	+20	43	C	C	–	Not held		–		–		–		(Brazil) André Dias	23	(Germany) Winfried Schäfer
2009–10	1	3rd	22	14	3	5	57	29	+28	45	Round of 16	Semi-Finals	C	–		–		AFC Champions League	GS	–		(Argentina) José Sand	33	(Germany) Winfried Schäfer (Morocco) Rachid Benmahmoud * (Brazil) Toninho Cerezo (United Arab Emirates) Abdulhameed Al Mistaki *
2010–11	1	10th	22	6	7	9	33	35	−2	25	Round of 16	RU	–	–		–		AFC Champions League	GS	–		(Argentina) José Sand (United Arab Emirates) Omar Abdulrahman	11	(United Arab Emirates) Abdulhameed Al Mistaki * (United Arab Emirates) Ahmed Abdullah * (Brazil) Alexandre Gallo
2011–12	1	1st	22	17	4	1	52	16	+36	55	Quarter-Finals	Group Stage	–	–		–		–		–		(Ghana) Asamoah Gyan	27	(Romania) Cosmin Olăroiu
2012–13	1	1st	26	20	2	4	74	26	+48	62	Semi-Finals	Group Stage	C	–		–		AFC Champions League	GS	–		(Ghana) Asamoah Gyan	32	(Romania) Cosmin Olăroiu
2013–14	1	6th	26	12	7	7	52	33	+19	43	C	Group Stage	RU	–		–		AFC Champions League	QF	–		(Ghana) Asamoah Gyan	45	(Uruguay) Jorge Fossati (United Arab Emirates) Ahmed Abdullah * (Spain) Quique Flores (Croatia) Zlatko Dalić
2014–15	1	1st	26	18	6	2	62	19	+43	60	Quarter-Finals	Group Stage	RU	–		–				–				
2014–15	1	1st	26	18	6	2	62	19	+43	60	Quarter-Finals	Group Stage	RU	–		–		AFC Champions League	SF	–		(Ghana) Asamoah Gyan	24	(Croatia) Zlatko Dalić
2014–15	1	1st	26	18	6	2	62	19	+43	60	Quarter-Finals	Group Stage	RU	–		–		AFC Champions League	R16	–		(Ghana) Asamoah Gyan	24	(Croatia) Zlatko Dalić
2015–16	1	2nd	26	18	3	5	53	24	+29	57	RU	Group Stage	C	Cancelled		–		AFC Champions League	QF	Emirati-Moroccan Super Cup	C	(Brazil) Dyanfres Douglas	18	(Croatia) Zlatko Dalić
2016–17	1	4th	26	17	4	5	58	37	+21	55	Quarter-Finals	Group Stage	–	Cancelled		Arab Club Champions Cup	W (Note: Al-Ain withdrew the tournament, Al-Wahda replaced it.)	AFC Champions League	RU	–		(Brazil) Caio Lucas	18	(Croatia) Zlatko Dalić (Croatia) Joško Španjić * (Croatia) Zoran Mamić
2016–17	1	4th	26	17	4	5	58	37	+21	55	Quarter-Finals	Group Stage	–	Cancelled		Arab Club Champions Cup	W	AFC Champions League	QF	–		(Brazil) Caio Lucas	18	(Croatia) Zlatko Dalić (Croatia) Joško Španjić * (Croatia) Zoran Mamić
2017–18	1	1st	22	16	5	1	65	23	+42	53	C	Quarter-Finals	–	Not held		–		AFC Champions League	QF	–		(Sweden) Marcus Berg	35	(Croatia) Zoran Mamić
2017–18	1	1st	22	16	5	1	65	23	+42	53	C	Quarter-Finals	–	Not held		–		AFC Champions League	R16	–		(Sweden) Marcus Berg	35	(Croatia) Zoran Mamić
2018–19	1	4th	26	14	4	8	45	35	+10	46	Round of 16	Quarter-Finals	RU	Not held		Arab Club Champions Cup	R32	AFC Champions League	GS	FIFA Club World Cup	RU	(Brazil) Caio Lucas	17	(Croatia) Zoran Mamić (Croatia) Željko Sopić * (Spain) Juan Garrido
2019–20 (Note: 2019–20 UAE football season was cancelled due to the COVID-19 pandemic in the United Arab Emirates.)	1	2nd	19	11	4	4	46	21	+25	37	Final	Semi-Finals	–	Not held		—		AFC Champions League	GS	—		(Togo) Kodjo Laba	28	(Croatia) Ivan Leko (Iraq) Ghazi Fahad * (Portugal) Pedro Emanuel
2020–21	1	6th	26	11	8	7	39	33	+6	41	Round of 16	First Round	–	Not held		—		AFC Champions League	QS	—		(Togo) Kodjo Laba	13	(Portugal) Pedro Emanuel
2021–22	1	1st	26	20	5	1	57	17	+40	65	Quarter-finals	C	–	Not held		—		—		—		(Togo) Kodjo Laba	31	(Ukraine) Serhii Rebrov
2022–23	1	2nd	26	16	6	4	67	31	+36	54	RU	RU	RU	Not held		—		—		—		(Togo) Kodjo Laba	31	(Ukraine) Serhii Rebrov
2023–24	1	3rd	26	14	3	9	54	37	+17	45	Quarter-finals	RU	—	Not held		—		AFC Champions League	C	—		(Morocco) Soufiane Rahimi	23	(Netherlands) Alfred Schreuder (Argentina) Hernán Crespo
2024–25	1	5th	26	12	8	9	56	32	+24	44	Quarter-finals	Quarter-finals	—	Not held		—		AFC Champions League	LS	FIFA Intercontinental Cup	R2	(Togo) Kodjo Fo-Doh Laba	20	(Argentina) Hernán Crespo (Portugal) Leonardo Jardim (Serbia) Vladimir Ivić
2024–25	1	5th	26	12	8	9	56	32	+24	44	Quarter-finals	Quarter-finals	—	Not held		—		AFC Champions League	LS	FIFA Club World Cup	GS	(Togo) Kodjo Fo-Doh Laba	20	(Argentina) Hernán Crespo (Portugal) Leonardo Jardim (Serbia) Vladimir Ivić
