= 1998–99 Al Ain FC season =

Al Ain
1998–99 season
- President: Mohammed Bin Zayed
- Manager: Nelo Vingada (from 1998 until 15 November 1998); Ilie Balaci (from 15 November 1998)
- UAE Football League: 2nd
- President's Cup: Winners
- Asian Club Championship: Third place
- Top goalscorer: League: Seydou Traoré (11); All: Seydou Traoré (15)
Home colours	Away colours	Third colours

The 1998–99 season was Al Ain Football Club's 31st in existence and the club's 24th consecutive season in the top-level football league in the UAE.

== Club ==
=== Technical staff ===
Position	Name
Head coach	(Portugal) Nelo Vingada (Sacked) (Romania) Ilie Balaci
Assistant coach	(Portugal) António Simões
Goalkeeping coach	(Iraq) Samir Shaker
Team Manager	(United Arab Emirates) Rabea Ibrahim

== Competitions ==
=== Overview ===
Competition	First match	Last match	Starting round	Final position	Record							
Competition	First match	Last match	Starting round	Final position	Pld	W	D	L	GF	GA	GD	Win %
Football League	2 October 1998	6 May 1999	Matchday 1	2nd	33	16	9	8	58	36	+22	48.48
President's Cup	9 May 1999	27 May 1999	Round of 16	Winners	4	4	0	0	7	2	+5	100.00
Asian Club Championship	4 September 1998	30 April 1999	First round	Third place	9	6	0	3	22	10	+12	66.67
Total					46	26	9	11	87	48	+39	56.52

Last updated: 27 May 1999
Source: Competitions

=== UAE Football League ===
==== League table ====
Pos	Team	Pld	W	D	L	GF	GA	GD	Pts
1	Al Wahda	33	19	8	6	68	35	+33	65
2	Al Ain	33	16	9	8	58	36	+22	57
3	Al-Nasr	33	16	8	9	64	49	+15	56
4	Al Wasl	33	16	7	10	63	37	+26	55
5	Al Ahli	33	15	7	11	69	54	+15	52

Source: rsssf.com

==== Results by round ====
Round	1	2	3	4	5	6	7	8	9	10	11	12	13	14	15	16	17	18	19	20	21	22	23	24	25	26	27	28	29	30	31	32	33
Ground	A	A	H	A	H	A	H	A	H	A	H	H	H	A	H	A	H	A	H	A	H	A	A	A	H	A	H	A	H	A	H	A	H
Result	D	L	L	W	L	D	W	L	W	D	W	W	W	D	D	W	W	D	L	D	D	W	W	L	W	D	L	W	W	W	L	W	W
Position			10	9			11	11	7																		5					2	2

Updated to match(es) played on 6 May 1999. Source: UAE Pro League
A = Away; H = Home; W = Win; D = Draw; L = Loss

==== Matches ====
2 October 1998 1	Baniyas	0–0	Al Ain	Abu Dhabi
		Report

15 October 1998 3	Al Ain	0–1	Sharjah	Al-Ain
		Report; Report	I. Mohamed 7'	Stadium: Tahnoun bin Mohammed; Referee: Saeed Abdullah

31 October 1998 5	Al Ain	2–3	Al Wahda	Al-Ain
	Pele 12'; M. Mohamed 78'	Report	Alboury Lah 43'; A. Jumaa 45'; F. Ismail 89'	Stadium: Tahnoun bin Mohammed

7 November 1998 6	Al Shabab	1–1	Al Ain	Dubai
	Marcal 75'			Stadium: Maktoum bin Rashid Al Maktoum

10 November 1998 2	Al Wasl	1–0	Al Ain	Dubai
	Darwish 52'			Stadium: Zabeel Stadium

13 November 1998 7	Al Ain	1–0	Al Jazira	Al-Ain
	Pele 44'			Stadium: Tahnoun bin Mohammed

19 November 1998 8	Al Ahli	1–0	Al Ain	Dubai
	Shah 21'	Report; Report		Stadium: Rashid Stadium

23 November 1998 4	Al Khaleej	2–5	Al Ain	Khor Fakkan
	Benmahmoud; N. Hamdan	Report	Traoré; Al Owais; Pele; J. Tawfiq; H. Saeed

27 November 1998 9	Al Ain	2–1	Al Nasr	Al-Ain
	Pele 17'; J. Tawfiq 28' (pen.)	Report; Report	Geert 26'	Stadium: Tahnoun bin Mohammed

4 December 1998 10	Al Shaab	1–1	Al Ain	Sharjah
	S. Yousif 81'		Al Owais 88'	Stadium: Khalid bin Mohammed Stadium

10 December 1998 11	Al Ain	5–0	Ras Al Khaimah	Al-Ain
	Al Owais 30', 34'; J. Tawfiq 36'; Traoré 55'			Stadium: Tahnoun bin Mohammed

25 December 1998 12	Al Ain	2–1	Baniyas	Al-Ain
	Al Owais 29'		A. Traoré 70'	Stadium: Tahnoun bin Mohammed

31 December 1998 13	Al Ain	2–1	Al Wasl	Al-Ain
	Pele 11'; Hamdoon 31' (pen.)		H. Yousuf 40' (pen.)	Stadium: Tahnoun bin Mohammed

7 January 1999 14	Sharjah	1–1	Al Ain	Sharjah
	Jumaa 59'		Traoré 26'	Stadium: Sharjah Stadium

11 January 1999 15	Al Ain	1–1	Al Khaleej	Al-Ain
	Traoré 35'		Annan 90'	Stadium: Tahnoun bin Mohammed

25 January 1999 16	Al Wahda	1–2	Al Ain	Abu Dhabi
	A. Jumaa 39'		Al Owais 47', 48'	Stadium: Al Nahyan Stadium

28 January 1999 17	Al Ain	1–0	Al Shabab	Al-Ain
				Stadium: Tahnoun bin Mohammed

3 February 1999 18	Al Jazira	1–1	Al Ain	Abu Dhabi
	Tiéhi 90'		J. Tawfiq 89' (pen.)

12 February 1999 19	Al Ain	2–3	Al Ahli	Al-Ain
	Traoré 7', 89'		S. Abdullah 17'; F. Khalil 62'; Atiq 72'	Stadium: Tahnoun bin Mohammed

17 February 1999 20	Al Nasr	0–0	Al Ain	Dubai
				Stadium: Al Maktoum Stadium

5 March 1999 23	Baniyas	2–4	Al Ain	Abu Dhabi
	A. Traoré 44'; Kambou 75'		Traoré 15', 83'; Pele 80'; Al Nowais 85'

10 March 1999 24	Al Wasl	3–0	Al Ain	Dubai
	M. Omar 80', 87'; Otokoré 83'			Stadium: Zabeel Stadium

14 March 1999 25	Al Ain	5–1	Sharjah	Al-Ain
	J. Tawfiq 7', 38'; Al Nowais 13'; G. Harib 25'; Pele 45'		Ereyahi 24'	Stadium: Tahnoun bin Mohammed

18 March 1999 26	Al Khaleej	1–1	Al Ain	Khor Fakkan
	Annan 50'		Al Nowais 70'

22 March 1999 21	Al Ain	1–1	Al Shaab	Al-Ain
	S. Rashed 69'		Al-Doukhi 76'	Stadium: Tahnoun bin Mohammed

25 March 1999 27	Al Ain	1–2	Al Wahda	Al-Ain
	H. Saeed 61'		F. Masoud 4'; Alboury Lah 85'	Stadium: Tahnoun bin Mohammed

1 April 1999 28	Al Shabab	0–1	Al Ain	Dubai
			Traoré 25'	Stadium: Maktoum bin Rashid Al Maktoum

4 April 1999 22	Ras Al Khaimah	2–7	Al Ain	Ras al-Khaimah
	Nouh 22'; Drigo 52'		A. Gharib 12'; H. Saeed 13'; G. Harib 51', 76'; Traoré 53'; A. Ali 60'; M. Abdullah 90'

7 April 1999 29	Al Ain	1–0	Al Jazira	Al-Ain
	Al Nowais 75'			Stadium: Tahnoun bin Mohammed

14 April 1999 30	Al Ahli	0–2	Al Ain	Dubai
			H. Saeed 36', 80'	Stadium: Rashid Stadium

18 April 1999 31	Al Ain	1–3	Al Nasr	Al-Ain
	Al Nowais 9'		Mossi 1', 53'; E. Juma 85'	Stadium: Tahnoun bin Mohammed

22 April 1999 32	Al Shaab	1–3	Al Ain	Sharjah
	Moudakkar 63'		H. Mubarak 11'; M. Mohamed 16', 17'	Stadium: Khalid bin Mohammed Stadium

6 May 1999 33	Al Ain	2–0	Ras Al Khaimah	Al-Ain
	Traoré 32'; M. Mohamed 77'			Stadium: Tahnoun bin Mohammed

=== UAE President's Cup ===
9 May 1999 Round of 16	Al Ain	2–0	Al Dhaid	Dubai
	Al Owais 5'; Al Nowais 26'			Stadium: Zabeel Stadium

12 May 1999 Quarter-finals	Al Ain	2–1	Al Shaab	Abu Dhabi
	Traoré 32'; Al Owais 86'		Al Doukhi 20'	Stadium: Al Nahyan Stadium

19 May 1999 Semi-finals	Al Ain	2–1	Al Wasl	Abu Dhabi
7:30 GMT+4 (UAE Time)	Al Nowais 77'; Traoré 90'	Report	Otokoré 40'	Stadium: Al Jazira Stadium

27 May 1999 Final	Al Ain	1–0 (a.e.t.)	Al Shabab	Abu Dhabi
	H. Mubarak 101'	Report		Stadium: Al Nahyan Stadium; Attendance: 10,000; Referee: Fareed Ali

=== Asian Club Championship ===
==== First round ====
4 September 1998 First leg	Al Ain (United Arab Emirates)	5–2	Oman	Al Ain
	Daoudi 7'; J. Tawfiq 18' (pen.); Traoré 20'; Al Nowais 64'; Pelé 75'	Report	M. Zayed 45'; D. Salem 85' (pen.)	Stadium: Tahnoun bin Mohammed

18 September 1998 Second leg	Oman	0–2	(United Arab Emirates) Al Ain	Muscat
		Report	H. Saeed 30'; Daoudi 65'

==== Round of 16 ====
9 October 1998 First leg	Al Ain (United Arab Emirates)	3–1	(Lebanon) Al-Ansar	Al Ain
	H. Saeed 10', 56'; Pelé 45'	Report	Prosper 26'

25 October 1998 Second leg	Al-Ansar (Lebanon)	1–0	(United Arab Emirates) Al Ain	Beirut

==== Quarter-finals ====
Team	Pld	W	D	L	GF	GA	GD	Pts
(United Arab Emirates) Al-Ain	3	2	0	1	7	2	+5	6
(Iran) Esteghlal	3	2	0	1	3	2	+1	6
(Saudi Arabia) Al-Hilal	3	1	0	2	5	5	0	3
(Turkmenistan) Köpetdag Aşgabat	3	1	0	2	4	10	−6	3

Source: AFC

25 February 1999	Al Ain (United Arab Emirates)	6–1	(Turkmenistan) Köpetdag Aşgabat	Al Ain
	Al Owais 5', 80'; Shila 14', 41'; Pelé 55'; H. Saeed	Report	Bairamov 20'	Stadium: Tahnoun bin Mohammed

27 February 1999	Al Ain (United Arab Emirates)	0–1	(Iran) Esteghlal	Al Ain
			Akbarpour 70'	Stadium: Tahnoun bin Mohammed

1 March 1999	Al Ain (United Arab Emirates)	1–0	(Saudi Arabia) Al-Hilal	Al Ain
	G. Harib 68'			Stadium: Tahnoun bin Mohammed

==== Semi-finals ====
28 April 1999	Al-Ain (United Arab Emirates)	2–2^{(aet, 2–4 PK)}	(Japan) Júbilo Iwata	Tehran
	Al Nowais 35', 66'		Tanaka 15'; Fujita 37'	Stadium: Azadi Stadium

==== Third place ====
30 April 1999	Al-Ain (United Arab Emirates)	3–2	(China) Dalian Wanda	Tehran
	Traoré 7'; Pelé 61'; G. Harib 80'		Yan Song 23'; Němeček 44'	Stadium: Azadi Stadium

== Statistics ==
=== Goalscorers ===
As of 27 May 1999

Includes all competitive matches. The list is sorted alphabetically by surname when total goals are equal.

Rank	Pos.	Player	Football League	President's Cup	Asian Club Championship	Total
1	FW	(Burkina Faso) Seydou Traoré	11	2	2	15
2	FW	(United Arab Emirates) Majid Al Owais	7	2	2	11
2	MF	(Ghana) Abedi Pele	7	0	4	11
4	FW	(United Arab Emirates) Fahad Al Nowais	5	2	3	10
5	MF	(United Arab Emirates) Helal Saeed	5	0	4	9
6	MF	(United Arab Emirates) Jasem Tawfiq	6	0	1	7
7	MF	(United Arab Emirates) Gharib Harib	3	0	2	5
8	FW	(United Arab Emirates) Musabbah Mohamed	4	0	0	4
8	MF	(United Arab Emirates) Salem Johar	4	0	0	4
10	MF	(United Arab Emirates) Hamad Mubarak	1	1	0	2
10	FW	(United Arab Emirates) Abdullah Shila	0	0	2	2
10	MF	(Morocco) Rachid Daoudi	0	0	2	2
14	DF	(United Arab Emirates) Mohamad Abdullah	1	0	0	1
14	DF	(United Arab Emirates) Abdullah Ali	1	0	0	1
14	MF	(United Arab Emirates) Awad Gharib	1	0	0	1
14	MF	(United Arab Emirates) Sultan Rashed	1	0	0	1
14	DF	(United Arab Emirates) Mohammed Hamdoon	1	0	0	1
Own goals (from the opponents)			0	0	0	0
Totals			58	7	22	87

== Awards ==
Asian Club Championship

Award	Player
Most Valuable Player	(Burkina Faso) Seydou Traoré
