= 2000–01 Al Ain FC season =

Al Ain
2000–01 season
- President: Mohammed Bin Zayed
- Manager: Oscar Fulloné (from 29 June 2000 until 13 November 2000); Mrad Mahjoub (from 13 November 2000 until 13 March 2001); Anghel Iordănescu (from 13 March 2001)
- UAE Football League: 4th
- President's Cup: Winners
- Federation Cup: Group Stage
- Gulf Club Champions Cup: Winners
- Asian Club Championship: Second round
- Top goalscorer: League: Juma Mossi (15); All: Juma Mossi (8)
Home colours	Away colours
- All statistics correct as of 7 June 2001.

The 2000–01 season was Al Ain Football Club's 33rd in existence and the club's 26th consecutive season in the top-level football league in the UAE.

== Club ==
=== Technical staff ===
Position	Name
Sporting Director	(Tunisia) Mrad Mahjoub
Head coach	(Argentina) Oscar Fulloné (Sacked) (Tunisia) Mrad Mahjoub (Caretaker) (Romania) Anghel Iordănescu
Assistant coach	(United Arab Emirates) Ahmed Abdullah (United Arab Emirates) Abdulhameed Al Mistaki (Tunisia) Mohammad El Mansi
Fitness coach	(Morocco) Abdulrahim Dazaz
Physiotherapist	(Poland) Wiesław Sojka (Brazil) Edimar Da Silva
Team Manager	(United Arab Emirates) Butti Al Shamsi

Last updated: 13 March 2001

== Competitions ==
=== Overview ===
Competition	First match	Last match	Starting round	Final position	Record							
Competition	First match	Last match	Starting round	Final position	Pld	W	D	L	GF	GA	GD	Win %
Football League	18 October 2000	14 March 2001	Matchday 1	4th	22	10	4	8	33	27	+6	45.45
President's Cup	5 April 2001	7 June 2001	Group stage	Winners	9	8	0	1	21	9	+12	88.89
Federation Cup	6 September 2000	5 October 2000	Group stage	Group stage	5	2	0	3	11	12	−1	40.00
Gulf Club Champions Cup	3 January 2001	14 January 2001	First round	Winners	5	4	0	1	6	4	+2	80.00
Asian Club Championship	11 September 2000	16 November 2000	First round	Second round	4	1	1	2	7	6	+1	25.00
Total					45	25	5	15	78	58	+20	55.56

Last updated: 7 June 2001
Source: Competitions

=== UAE Football League ===
==== League table ====
Pos	Team	Pld	W	D	L	GF	GA	GD	Pts
2	Al Ahli (Dubai)	22	13	3	6	47	36	+11	42
3	Al Jazira	22	11	5	6	47	33	+14	38
4	Al Ain	22	10	4	8	33	27	+6	34
5	Al Wasl	22	9	5	8	42	32	+10	32
6	Al-Shaab	22	8	8	6	32	26	+6	32

Source: rsssf.org

==== Matches ====
18 October 2000 1	Al Ain	0–0	Al Shabab	Al Ain
19:00 GMT+4 (UAE Time)		Report		Stadium: Tahnoun bin Mohammed; Referee: Younis Al Yassi

22 October 2000 3	Al Ain	3–1	Al Nasr	Al Ain
	H. Saeed 78'; G. Harib 85'	Report	Y. Mousa 2'	Stadium: Tahnoun bin Mohammed; Referee: Musallam Ahmad

26 October 2000 2	Al Wahda	1–0	Al Ain	Abu Dhabi
	Tondelua 60'	Report		Stadium: Al Nahyan Stadium; Referee: Fareed Al-Marzouqi

9 November 2000 5	Al Ain	1–2	Sharjah	Al Ain
	Al Owais 79'	Report	Al Anberi 45'; Fadhli 85'	Stadium: Tahnoun bin Mohammed; Referee: Hassan Eisa

22 November 2000 7	Al Ain	1–0	Emirates	Al Ain
	Mossi 40'	Report		Stadium: Tahnoun bin Mohammed; Referee: Musallam Ahmad

25 November 2000 4	Al Shaab	1–1	Al Ain	Sharjah
	Diop 83'	Report		Stadium: Khalid bin Mohammed Stadium; Referee: Saeed Abdullah

1 December 2000 8	Al Ahli	1–2	Al Ain	Dubai
	F. Khalil 19'	Report	S. Khater 31'; Mossi 40'	Stadium: Rashid Stadium; Referee: Musallam Ahmad

7 December 2000 9	Al Ain	6–2	Ittihad Kalba	Al Ain
21:30 GMT+4 (UAE Time)	Mossi 48'; Sandro 71'; S. Khater 80'	Report	J. Mohamed 26'; I. Mohamed 65'	Stadium: Tahnoun bin Mohammed

14 December 2000 10	Al Jazira	2–1	Al Ain	Abu Dhabi
21:30 GMT+4 (UAE Time)	Suhail 52', 84'	Report	Mossi 76'	Stadium: Al Jazira Stadium

17 December 2000 6	Al Wasl	2–1	Al Ain	Dubai
21:30 GMT+4 (UAE Time)	M. Omar 12'; Daoudi 90' (pen.)	Report	S. Khater 33'	Stadium: Zabeel Stadium

20 December 2000 11	Ahli Al Fujairah	0–1	Al Ain	Fujairah
21:30 GMT+4 (UAE Time)		Report	J. Khater 64'	Stadium: Fujairah Stadium

24 December 2000 12	Al Shabab	2–1	Al Ain	Dubai
21:30 GMT+4 (UAE Time)	Adamu 24', 53'	Report	G. Harib 72'	Stadium: Maktoum bin Rashid Al Maktoum; Referee: Saeed Abdullah

19 January 2001 14	Al Nasr	1–1	Al Ain	Dubai
19:00 GMT+4 (UAE Time)	Kadem .A 41'	Report	G. Harib 21'	Stadium: Al Maktoum Stadium; Referee: Fareed Al-Marzouqi

25 January 2001 15	Al Ain	1–2	Al Shaab	Al Ain
	S. Khater 26'		A. Ibrahim 55'; Jesmi 69'	Stadium: Tahnoun bin Mohammed

28 January 2001 16	Sharjah	1–0	Al Ain	Sharjah
	Fadhli 26'	Report		Stadium: Sharjah Stadium

31 January 2001 17	Al Ain	1–0	Al Wasl	Al Ain
	Mossi 81'	Report		Stadium: Tahnoun bin Mohammed; Referee: Abdulaziz Al Mulla

19 February 2001 18	Emirates	2–3	Al Ain	Ras al-Khaimah
	Moustawdaa 84', 88'	Report	Mossi 4', 46', 68'	Stadium: Emirates Club Stadium; Referee: Fareed Al-Marzouqi

23 February 2001 19	Al Ain	1–3	Al Ahli	Al-Ain
19:00 GMT+4 (UAE Time)	G. Harib 50'	Report	Benmahmoud 58', 77'; Hassan .A 84'	Stadium: Tahnoun bin Mohammed; Referee: Ali Bujsaim

26 February 2001 20	Ittihad Kalba	1–2	Al Ain	Kalba
	Skočić 30'	Report	Sandro 43'; R. Yaslam 56'	Stadium: Ittihad Kalba Stadium; Referee: Musallam Ahmad

3 March 2001 21	Al Ain	3–1	Al Jazira	Al Ain
	Sandro 38'; S. Khater 63', 90'	Report	Suhail 82'	Stadium: Tahnoun bin Mohammed

10 March 2001 13	Al Ain	1–1	Al Wahda	Al Ain
19:00 GMT+4 (UAE Time)	G. Harib 60'	Report	Abdulsalam 57'	Stadium: Tahnoun bin Mohammed; Referee: Mohamed Omar

14 March 2001 22	Al Ain	2–1	Ahli Al Fujairah	Al Ain
	S. Khater 40' (pen.); G. Harib 85'	Report	S. Ali 58' (o.g.)	Stadium: Tahnoun bin Mohammed; Referee: Mohamed Al-Zarouni

=== UAE President's Cup ===
==== Group D ====
Team	Pld	W	D	L	GF	GA	GD	Pts
Al Ain	5	4	0	1	12	6	+6	12
Al Jazira	5	3	2	0	11	2	+9	11
Ahli Al Fujairah	5	2	2	1	8	7	+1	8
Dubai	5	1	2	2	6	6	0	5
Al Dhaid	5	1	1	3	9	16	−7	4
Hatta	5	0	1	4	5	14	−9	1

Source: rsssf.org, alainteam.com

5 April 2001 Round 1	Al Jazira	2–0	Al Ain	Abu Dhabi
19:30	Ebiede 14'; M. Saad 48'	Report; Report		Stadium: Al Jazira Stadium; Referee: Mohamed Omar

11 April 2001 Round 2	Al Ain	2–1	Al Dhaid	Al Ain
19:30	R. Yaslam 21', 43'	Report; Report	Traoré 60' (pen.)	Stadium: Tahnoun bin Mohammed; Referee: Mohamed Al-Zarouni

18 April 2001 Round 3	Dubai	1–3	Al Ain	Dubai
19:30	(pen.)	Report	Mossi 65', 81'	Stadium: Dubai Club Stadium

27 April 2001 Round 4	Al Ain	4–1	Ahli Al Fujairah	Al Ain
19:30	R. Yaslam 38', 84'; A. Ali 64'; Mossi 71'	Report; Report	H. Abdullah 76'	Stadium: Tahnoun bin Mohammed; Referee: Khaled Al-Doukhi

2 May 2001 Round 5	Hatta	1–3	Al Ain	Hatta
19:30	26'	Report	Tiéhi 13', 52'; Mossi 85'	Stadium: Hatta Stadium

23 May 2001 Round of 16	Ittihad Kalba	0–3	Al Ain	Sharjah
19:45		Report; Report	Mossi 16', 79'; Tiéhi 73'	Stadium: Sharjah Stadium

27 May 2001 Quarter-finals	Al Ain	1–0	Al Nasr	Abu Dhabi
20:45	Tiéhi 53'	Report; Report		Stadium: Al Jazira Stadium

30 May 2001 Semi-finals	Al Ain	2–1	Al Shabab	Abu Dhabi
19:45	Tiéhi 39'	Report	Denílson 31'	Stadium: Al Nahyan Stadium

7 June 2001 Final	Al Ain	3–2	Al Shaab	Abu Dhabi
19:45 GMT+4 (UAE Time)	S. Yousif 71' (o.g.); Tiéhi 85'; Mossi 90'	Report	Brusselers 44', 79'	Stadium: Zayed Sports City; Attendance: 25,000; Referee: Mohamed Omar

=== UAE Federation Cup ===
==== Group A ====
Team	Pld	W	D	L	GF	GA	GD	Pts
Al Shaab	5	4	1	0	12	6	+6	13
Al Shabab	5	3	2	0	17	3	+14	11
Al Jazira	5	2	2	1	10	9	+1	8
Al Ain	5	2	0	3	11	12	−1	6
Ittihad Kalba	5	1	1	3	6	15	−9	4
Sharjah	5	0	0	5	3	14	−11	0

Source: rsssf.org

6 September 2000 1	Ittihad Kalba	1–5	Al Ain	Kalba
19:00	A. Hassan 18' (pen.)	Report	M. Abdullah 4'; Hamdoon 8' (pen.); J. Khater 59'; A. Ali 73'; F. Ali 93'	Stadium: Ittihad Kalba Stadium

17 September 2000 2	Al Ain	2–3	Al Jazira	Al Ain
19:00	G. Harib 68'; M. Abdullah 89'	Report	Tiéhi 60'; S. Obaid 87'; Ebiede 90'	Stadium: Tahnoun bin Mohammed; Referee: Ali Bujsaim

2 October 2000 3	Al Ain	1–5	Al Shabab	Al Ain
19:00	Musabbah .S 39'	Report	Denílson 29', 89'; Adamu 69', 70', 90'	Stadium: Tahnoun bin Mohammed; Referee: Mohamed Omar

29 September 2000 5	Al Ain	1–2	Al Shaab	Al Ain
19:00	G. Harib 71' (pen.)	Report	S. Ibraheem 74', 85'	Stadium: Tahnoun bin Mohammed; Referee: Abdullah Al Bannai

5 October 2000 4	Sharjah	1–2	Al Ain	Sharjah
19:00	A. Ibrahim 89'	Report	G. Harib 21'	Stadium: Sharjah Stadium; Referee: Fareed Al-Marzouqi

=== Gulf Club Champions Cup ===
Team	Pts	Pld	W	D	L	GF	GA	GD
(United Arab Emirates) Al Ain	12	5	4	0	1	6	4	+2
(Saudi Arabia) Al Ittihad	10	5	3	1	1	10	1	+9
(Oman) Dhofar	10	5	3	1	1	6	4	+2
(Kuwait) Al Salmiya	5	5	1	2	2	5	6	−1
(Qatar) Al-Ittihad	4	5	1	1	3	7	7	0
(Bahrain) Riffa	1	5	0	1	4	5	17	−12

3 January 2001 1	Al Ain (United Arab Emirates)	2–1	(Bahrain) Riffa	Al Ain
	S. Khater 53'	Report; Report	H. Darwish 82'	Stadium: Tahnoun bin Mohammed

6 January 2001 2	Al Ain (United Arab Emirates)	2–1	(Kuwait) Al Salmiya	Al Ain
17:00 GMT+4 (UAE Time)	S. Khater 47'; G. Harib 70'	Report	Al-Huwaidi 85'	Stadium: Tahnoun bin Mohammed

8 January 2001 3	Al Ain (United Arab Emirates)	1–0	(Qatar) Al-Ittihad	Al Ain
18:30 GMT+4 (UAE Time)	G. Harib 44'	Report		Stadium: Tahnoun bin Mohammed; Referee: Youssef Fadhel Al-Balushi (Oman)

12 January 2001 4	Al Ain (United Arab Emirates)	1–0	(Oman) Dhofar	Al Ain
18:30 GMT+4 (UAE Time)	Fahad .A 9'	Report		Stadium: Tahnoun bin Mohammed

14 January 2001 5	Al Ain (United Arab Emirates)	0–2	(Saudi Arabia) Al Ittihad	Al Ain
17:00 GMT+4 (UAE Time)		Report	Al-Yami 22', 77'	Stadium: Tahnoun bin Mohammed

=== Asian Club Championship ===
==== First round ====
11 September 2000 First leg	Al-Zawraa (Iraq)	2–1	(United Arab Emirates) Al Ain	Amman
	E. Mohammed 13', 37'	Report	S. Khater 70'	Stadium: Amman International Stadium; Attendance: 3,000; Referee: Abdulmajeed Abdulaziz (Bahrain)

22 September 2000 Second leg	Al Ain (United Arab Emirates)	4–0 (5–2 agg.)	(Iraq) Al-Zawraa	Al Ain
20:00	Rey 28', 78'; Berti 40' (pen.); F. Ali 86'	Report		Stadium: Tahnoun bin Mohammed; Referee: Khaled Dalu (Syria)

==== Second round ====
2 November 2000 First leg	Persepolis (Iran)	2–0	(United Arab Emirates) Al Ain	Tehran
15:30 GMT+4 (UAE Time)	Rafat 20', 55'	Report		Stadium: Azadi Stadium; Attendance: 80,000; Referee: Abdul Rahman Al-Zaid (Saudi Arabia)

16 November 2000 Second leg	Al Ain (United Arab Emirates)	2–2 (a.e.t.) (2–4 agg.)	(Iran) Persepolis	Al Ain
19:00 GMT+4 (UAE Time)	Sandro 58'; S. Khater 71' (pen.)	Report	Peyrovani 81'; Khanmohammadi 90'	Stadium: Tahnoun bin Mohammed

== Statistics ==
=== Goalscorers ===
As of 7 June 2001

Includes all competitive matches. The list is sorted alphabetically by surname when total goals are equal.

Rank	Pos.	Player	Football League	President's Cup	Federation Cup	Gulf Club Champions Cup	Asian Club Championship	Total
1	FW	(Burundi) Juma Mossi	8	7	0	0	0	15
2	MF	(United Arab Emirates) Gharib Harib	6	0	3	2	0	11
2	MF	(United Arab Emirates) Subait Khater	7	0	0	2	2	11
4	MF	(United Arab Emirates) Salem Johar	5	2	1	1	0	9
5	FW	(Ivory Coast) Joël Tiéhi	0	6	0	0	0	6
6	DF	(United Arab Emirates) Rami Yaslam	1	4	0	0	0	5
7	FW	(Brazil) Sandro Oliveira	3	0	0	0	1	4
8	FW	(Argentina) Emiliano Rey	0	0	0	0	2	2
8	DF	(United Arab Emirates) Mohamad Abdullah	0	0	2	0	0	2
8	DF	(United Arab Emirates) Juma Khater	1	0	1	0	0	2
8	DF	(United Arab Emirates) Abdullah Ali	0	1	1	0	0	2
8	FW	(United Arab Emirates) Faisal Ali	0	0	1	0	1	2
13	FW	(United Arab Emirates) Majid Al Owais	1	0	0	0	0	1
13	MF	(United Arab Emirates) Helal Saeed	1	0	0	0	0	1
13	MF	(Argentina) Sergio Berti	0	0	0	0	1	1
13	DF	(United Arab Emirates) Fahad Ali	0	0	0	1	0	1
13	FW	(United Arab Emirates) Musabbah Salem	0	0	1	0	0	1
13	DF	(United Arab Emirates) Mohammed Hamdoon	0	0	1	0	0	1
Own goals (from the opponents)			0	1	0	0	0	1
Totals			33	21	11	6	7	78

=== Hat-tricks ===
Player	Against	Result	Date	Competition	Round
(United Arab Emirates) Salem Johar	Ittihad Kalba	6–2 (H)	7 December 2000	Football League	9
(Burundi) Juma Mossi	Emirates	2–3 (A)	19 February 2001	Football League	18

^{4} – Player scored four goals.
