= 1998–99 UAE Football League =

UAE Football League
- Season: 1998–99
- Champions: Al Wahda
- Relegated: Sharjah; Ras Al Khaimah
- Asian Club Championship: Al Wahda
- Top goalscorer: Alboury Lah (29 goals)

Statistics of UAE Football League for the 1998–99 season.

== Overview ==
It was contested by 12 teams, and Al Wahda won the league.

== Personnel ==
| Team | Head coach |
|---|---|
| Al Ahli | (Federal Republic of Yugoslavia) Ljupko Petrović |
| Al Ain | (Romania) Ilie Balaci |
| Al Jazira | (Netherlands) Rinus Israël |
| Al Khaleej | |
| Al-Nasr | |
| Al-Shaab | |
| Al Shabab | |
| Al Wahda | (Netherlands) Ruud Krol |
| Al Wasl | (Brazil) Paulo Campos |
| Baniyas | |
| Ras Al Khaimah | |
| Sharjah | (Belgium) Henri Depireux |

== Foreign players ==
| Club | Player 1 | Player 2 | Player 3 | Former players |
|---|---|---|---|---|
| Al Ahli | (Morocco) Rachid Benmahmoud | (Nigeria) Anthony Nwaigwe | (Nigeria) Kingsley Obiekwu | (Burkina Faso) Seydou Traoré (Iran) Hashem Heydari |
| Al Ain | (Burkina Faso) Seydou Traoré | (Ghana) Abedi Pele | (Morocco) Rachid Daoudi | |
| Al Jazira | (Brazil) Toninho | (Ivory Coast) Joël Tiéhi | | |
| Al Khaleej | (Belgium) Abdoulaye Demba | (Tunisia) Mourad Chebbi | | |
| Al-Nasr | (Burundi) Juma Mossi | (Netherlands) Geert Brusselers | (Senegal) Pape Malick Diop | |
| Al-Shaab | | | | |
| Al Shabab | (Ghana) Baba Adamu | (Kuwait) Jasem Al-Huwaidi | | |
| Al Wahda | (Senegal) Alboury Lah | (Senegal) Amara Traoré | (Sierra Leone) Lamin Conteh | (Zambia) Kalusha Bwalya |
| Al Wasl | (Burkina Faso) Kassoum Ouédraogo | (Ivory Coast) Didier Otokoré | | |
| Baniyas | (Burkina Faso) Abdoulaye Traoré | (Burkina Faso) Romeo Kambou | | |
| Ras Al Khaimah | (Argentina) Alejandro Giuntini | | | |
| Sharjah | | | | |

== League standings ==
| Pos | Team | Pld | W | D | L | GF | GA | GD | Pts |
|---|---|---|---|---|---|---|---|---|---|
| 1 | Al Wahda | 33 | 19 | 8 | 6 | 68 | 35 | +33 | 65 |
| 2 | Al Ain | 33 | 16 | 9 | 8 | 58 | 36 | +22 | 57 |
| 3 | Al-Nasr | 33 | 16 | 8 | 9 | 64 | 49 | +15 | 56 |
| 4 | Al Wasl | 33 | 16 | 7 | 10 | 63 | 37 | +26 | 55 |
| 5 | Al Ahli | 33 | 15 | 7 | 11 | 69 | 54 | +15 | 52 |
| 6 | Al Jazira | 33 | 13 | 8 | 12 | 55 | 40 | +15 | 47 |
| 7 | Al-Shaab | 33 | 11 | 12 | 10 | 52 | 48 | +4 | 45 |
| 8 | Al Shabab | 33 | 12 | 7 | 14 | 41 | 51 | −10 | 43 |
| 9 | Al Khaleej | 33 | 11 | 9 | 13 | 65 | 69 | −4 | 42 |
| 10 | Baniyas | 33 | 10 | 10 | 13 | 44 | 52 | −8 | 40 |
| 11 | Sharjah | 33 | 9 | 10 | 14 | 43 | 58 | −15 | 37 |
| 12 | Ras Al Khaimah | 33 | 2 | 1 | 30 | 35 | 126 | −91 | 7 |

Source: rsssf.com
