= 1998–99 Club Atlético Boca Juniors season =

Boca Juniors football season

Boca Juniors
1998–99 season
- President: Mauricio Macri
- Manager: Carlos Bianchi
- Stadium: La Bombonera
- Apertura Tournament: Champion (23rd. title)
- Clausura Tournament: Champion (24th. title)
- Copa Mercosur: Quarter-finals
- Top goalscorer: League: All: Martín Palermo (32)
Home colours	Away colours

The 1998–99 Club Atlético Boca Juniors season was the 69th consecutive Primera División season played by the senior squad.

== Summary ==
After the 1998 FIFA World Cup in France, a new head coach arrived to the club: Carlos Bianchi former Velez Sarsfield manager wherein clinched 1994 Intercontinental Cup, 1994 Copa Libertadores and several local titles. The squad is reinforced with Barijho (a petition from Bianchi), Pereda and right back defender Hugo Ibarra. Also midfielder José Basualdo returned to the club. Finally, the team won undefeated the Apertura Tournament after a drought of 6 years aimed by a solid formation with Martin Palermo scoring 20 goals in 19 matches.

== Special uniforms ==
Alternate kits only worn in 1998 Copa Mercosur:

Home	Away	Third

== Squad ==
Note: Flags indicate national team as defined under FIFA eligibility rules; some limited exceptions apply. Players may hold more than one non-FIFA nationality.

No.	Pos.	Nation	Player
1	GK	COL	Oscar Córdoba
2	DF	COL	Jorge Bermúdez
3	DF	ARG	Rodolfo Arruabarrena
4	DF	ARG	Hugo Ibarra
5	MF	COL	Mauricio Serna
6	DF	ARG	Walter Samuel
7	FW	ARG	Guillermo Barros Schelotto
8	MF	ARG	Diego Cagna
9	FW	ARG	Martín Palermo
10	MF	ARG	Juan Román Riquelme
11	DF	ARG	Fernando Navas
12	GK	ARG	Roberto Abbondanzieri
13	DF	ARG	Christian Traverso

No.	Pos.	Nation	Player
15	DF	ARG	Anibal Matellán
16	MF	ARG	Ariel Rosada
17	MF	ARG	Gustavo Barros Schelotto
18	MF	ARG	José Basualdo
19	DF	ARG	César La Paglia
20	DF	ARG	Emiliano Rey
21	FW	ARG	Christian Giménez
24	DF	PER	José Pereda
27	FW	ARG	Antonio Barijho
28	FW	ARG	Ariel Carreño
29	DF	ARG	Adrián Guillermo
—	FW	ARG	Fernando Ortiz

=== Transfers ===
In
Pos.	Name	from	Type
FW	Antonio Barijho		
DF	Hugo Ibarra		
MF	José Horacio Basualdo		
MF	José Antonio Pereda	Universitario de Deportes	
MF	Gustavo Barros Schelotto	Gimnasia y Esgrima (LP)	

Out
Pos.	Name	To	Type
FW	Claudio Caniggia		
MF	Diego Latorre		
DF	Nelson Vivas	Arsenal F.C.	
DF	Nestor Fabbri	FC Nantes Atlantique	
DF	Héctor Pineda	Udinese Calcio	Definitive
MF	Nolberto Solano	Newcastle United	

==== January ====
In
Pos.	Name	From	Type

Out
Pos.	Name	To	Type

== Competitions ==
=== Torneo Apertura ===
==== League table ====
Pos	Team	Pld	W	D	L	GF	GA	GD	Pts
1	Boca Juniors	19	13	6	0	45	18	+27	45
2	Gimnasia y Esgrima (LP)	19	10	6	3	31	23	+8	36
3	Racing	19	9	6	4	39	29	+10	33
4	Lanús	19	8	6	5	20	20	0	30
5	Colón	19	7	5	7	28	27	+1	26

==== Matches ====
9 August 1998 1	Ferro Carril Oeste	2–4	Boca Juniors	Buenos Aires
	Giaccone 73' (pen.); Martens 90'		Sartori 6', o.g.' Navas 18'; Palermo 20'; Riquelme 45'	Stadium: Ferro C. Oeste; Referee: Fabián Madorrán

16 August 1998 2	Boca Juniors	3–2	Gimnasia y Esgrima (J)	Buenos Aires
	Cagna 38'; Palermo 45'; Riquelme 62'		Palermo 48' (o.g.); Aguirrez 53'	Stadium: La Bombonera; Referee: Horacio Elizondo

23 August 1998 3	Boca Juniors	2–2	Argentinos Juniors	Buenos Aires
	Palermo 59', 64'	Report	Quinteros 14', 52'	Stadium: La Bombonera; Referee: Daniel Giménez

30 August 1998 4	Gimnasia y Esgrima (LP)	0–0	Boca Juniors	La Plata
		Report		Stadium: Juan C. Zerillo; Referee: Francisco Lamolina

6 September 1998 5	Boca Juniors	6–2	Huracán	Buenos Aires
	Navas 8'; Palermo 16', 90'; Giménez 48'; Guillermo B.S. 84'; Basualdo 87'	Report	Montenegro 63'; Silvera 85'	Stadium: La Bombonera; Referee: Claudio Martín

13 September 1998 6	Belgrano (C)	2–4	Boca Juniors	Córdoba
	Enría 73'; Artime 79'	Report	F. Ortiz 35'; Palermo 46', 90'; Guillermo B.S. 86'	Stadium: Chateau Carreras; Referee: Angel Sánchez

20 September 1998 7	Boca Juniors	2–1	Newell's Old Boys	Buenos Aires
	Palermo 64', 79'	Report	Faggiani 90'	Stadium: La Bombonera; Referee: Fabián Madorrán

27 September 1998 8	Racing	1–1	Boca Juniors	Avellaneda
	Úbeda 80'		Arruabarrena 41'	Stadium: Presidente Perón; Referee: Horacio Elizondo

4 October 1998 9	Boca Juniors	3–0	Platense	Buenos Aires
		Report	Basualdo 5'; Riquelme 51'; Samuel 61'	Stadium: La Bombonera; Referee: Angel Sánchez

10 October 1998 10	Colón	0–3	Boca Juniors	Santa Fe
		Report	Basualdo 18'; Palermo 43'; Guillermo B.S. 75'	Stadium: Brigadier López; Referee: Oscar Sequeira

18 October 1998 11	Boca Juniors	2–0	Vélez Sarsfield	Buenos Aires
	Palermo 3', 76'	Report		Stadium: La Bombonera; Referee: Horacio Elizondo

25 October 1998 12	River Plate	0–0	Boca Juniors	Buenos Aires
				Stadium: Monumental; Referee: Angel Sánchez

1 November 1998 13	Boca Juniors	3–0	Estudiantes LP	Buenos Aires
	Palermo 10'; Cagna 34'; Navas 90'			Stadium: La Bombonera; Referee: Fabián Madorrán

8 November 1998 14	San Lorenzo	1–3	Boca Juniors	Buenos Aires
	Gorosito 40' (pen.)	Report	Paleermo 35'; Cagna 71'; Guillermo B.S. 83'	Stadium: Nuevo Gasómetro; Referee: Daniel Giménez

15 November 1998 15	Boca Juniors	2–1	Talleres (C)	Buenos Aires
	Guillermo B.S. 1'; Palermo 90'	Report	Zelaya 83'	Stadium: La Bombonera; Referee: Roberto Ruscio

21 November 1998 16	Rosario Central	2–3	Boca Juniors	Rosario
	Maceratesi 10', 58'	Report	Palermo 33', 87'; Cagna 34'	Stadium: Gigante de Arroyito; Referee: Oscar Sequeira

29 November 1998 17	Boca Juniors	0–0	Independiente	Buenos Aires
		Report		Stadium: La Bombonera; Referee: Daniel Giménez

6 December 1998 18	Lanús	1–1	Boca Juniors	Lanús
	Belloso 10'	Report	Barijho 69'	Stadium: Lanús Stadium; Attendance: Horacio Elizondo

13 December 1998 19	Boca Juniors	3–1	Unión (SF)	Buenos Aires
	Palermo 5', 52'; Arruabarrena 8'	Report	Castillo 57'	Stadium: La Bombonera

=== Torneo Clausura ===
==== League table ====
Pos	Team	Pld	W	D	L	GF	GA	GD	Pts
1	Boca Juniors	19	13	5	1	35	11	+24	44
2	River Plate	19	11	4	4	37	19	+18	37
3	San Lorenzo	19	10	6	3	33	19	+14	36
4	Rosario Central	19	9	5	5	24	20	+4	32
5	Independiente	19	8	5	6	32	26	+6	29

==== Matches ====
7 March 1999 1	Boca Juniors	3–0	Ferro Carril Oeste	Buenos Aires
	Palermo 13', 65'; Guillermo B.S. 88'	Report		Stadium: La Bombonera; Referee: Oscar Sequeira

13 March 1999 2	Gimnasia y Esgrima (J)	0–2	Boca Juniors	Jujuy
		Report	Palermo 62'; Guillermo B.S. 67'	Stadium: 23 de Agosto; Referee: Daniel Giménez

21 March 1999 3	Argentinos Juniors	0-3	Boca Juniors

28 March 1999 4	Boca Juniors	1-1	Gimnasia y Esgrima (LP)	La Boca
				Stadium: La Bombonera

1 April 1999 5	Huracán	0-1	Boca Juniors

4 April 1999 6	Boca Juniors	1-0	Belgrano (C)	La Boca
				Stadium: La Bombonera

10 April 1999 7	Newell's Old Boys	0-1	Boca Juniors

18 April 1999 8	Boca Juniors	4-0	Racing	La Boca
				Stadium: La Bombonera

24 April 1999 9	Platense	0-2	Boca Juniors

27 April 1999 10	Boca Juniors	1-1	Colon	La Boca
				Stadium: La Bombonera

2 May 1999 11	Velez Sarsfield	0-3	Boca Juniors

9 May 1999 12	Boca Juniors	2-1	River Plate	La Boca
				Stadium: La Bombonera

15 May 1999 13	Estudiantes La Plata	1-1	Boca Juniors

23 May 1999 14	Boca Juniors	3-0	San Lorenzo de Almagro	La Boca
				Stadium: La Bombonera

30 May 1999 15	Talleres (C)	0-0	Boca Juniors

2 June 1999 16	Boca Juniors	1-0	Rosario Central	La Boca
				Stadium: La Bombonera

6 June 1999 17	Independiente	4-0	Boca Juniors

13 June 1999 18	Boca Juniors	4-1	Lanús	La Boca
				Stadium: La Bombonera

19 June 1999 19	Unión de Santa Fe	2-2	Boca Juniors

== Copa Mercosur ==
=== Group stage ===
Pos	Team	Pld	W	D	L	GF	GA	GD	Pts	Qualification	(Argentina) VEL	(Argentina) BOC	(Brazil) FLA	(Paraguay) CER
1	(Argentina) Vélez Sársfield	6	3	2	1	7	6	+1	11	Advance to Quarter-finals	—	2–1	1–0	1–1
2	(Argentina) Boca Juniors	6	3	0	3	11	7	+4	9	Advance to Quarter-finals	0–1	—	3–0	3–1
3	(Brazil) Flamengo	6	3	0	3	7	8	−1	9		2–0	0–2	—	2–0
4	(Paraguay) Cerro Porteño	6	1	2	3	9	13	−4	5		2–2	3–2	2–3	—

5 August 1998 1	Boca Juniors (Argentina)	0–1	(Argentina) Vélez Sarsfield	Buenos Aires
		Report	Pellegrino 21'	Stadium: La Bombonera

19 August 1998 2	Cerro Porteño (Paraguay)	3–2	(Argentina) Boca Juniors	Asunción
	da Silva 21'; Fernández 54'; Gavilán 87'	Report	Ortiz 32'; Palermo 78'	Stadium: Defensores del Chaco

2 September 1998 3	Flamengo (Brazil)	0–2	(Argentina) Boca Juniors	Rio de Janeiro
		Report	Rey 19'; Matellán 83'	Stadium: Maracanã

17 September 1998 4	Vélez Sarsfield (Argentina)	2–1	(Argentina) Boca Juniors	Buenos Aires
	Camps 2'; Bassedas 34'	Report	Cagna 90'	Stadium: José Amalfitani

30 September 1998 5	Boca Juniors (Argentina)	3–1	(Paraguay) Cerro Porteño	Buenos Aires
	Giménez 51'; Palermo 69'; Basualdo 84'	Report	Ovelar 64'	Stadium: La Bombonera

14 October 1998 6	Boca Juniors (Argentina)	3–0	(Brazil) Flamengo	Buenos Aires
	La Paglia 6'; Cagna 32'; Navas 44'	Report		Stadium: La Bombonera

=== Knock-out stage ===
Quarter-finals

29 October 1998 1st Leg	Palmeiras (Brazil)	3–1	(Argentina) Boca Juniors	São Paulo
	Almir 27'; Arílson 48'; Magrão 89'	Report	Rey 51' (pen.)	Stadium: Parque Antártica

4 November 1998 2nd Leg	Boca Juniors (Argentina)	1–1 (2–4 agg.)	(Brazil) Palmeiras	Buenos Aires
	Palermo 58'	Report	Alex 80'	Stadium: La Bombonera

== Statistics ==
=== Players statistics ===
No.	Pos	Nat	Player	Total		Apertura 98		Clausura 99	
No.	Pos	Nat	Player	Apps	Goals	Apps	Goals	Apps	Goals
1	GK	(Colombia) COL	Oscar Córdoba	27	0	19	0	8	0
4	DF	(Argentina) ARG	Hugo Ibarra	25	0	13	0	12	0
6	DF	(Argentina) ARG	Walter Samuel	34	2	17	1	17	1
2	DF	(Colombia) COL	Jorge Bermudez	32	3	16	0	16	3
3	DF	(Argentina) ARG	Rodolfo Arruabarrena	36	3	18	2	18	1
8	MF	(Argentina) ARG	Diego Cagna	35	5	19	4	16	1
5	MF	(Colombia) COL	Mauricio Serna	29	0	18	0	11	0
18	MF	(Argentina) ARG	José Basualdo	33	3	16	3	17	0
10	MF	(Argentina) ARG	Juan Román Riquelme	37	10	19	3	18	7
9	FW	(Argentina) ARG	Martín Palermo	35	32	19	20	16	12
7	FW	(Argentina) ARG	Guillermo Barros Schelotto	28	10	14	5	14	5
12	GK	(Argentina) ARG	Roberto Abbondanzieri	8	0	0	0	8	0
	DF	(Argentina) ARG	Emiliano Rey	1	0	1	0		
19	DF	(Argentina) ARG	César La Paglia	9	0	7	0	2	0
15	DF	(Argentina) ARG	Anibal Matellán	14	0	7	0	7	0
13	DF	(Argentina) ARG	Christian Traverso	21	0	10	0	11	0
17	MF	(Argentina) ARG	Gustavo Barros Schelotto	9	0	3	0	6	0
27	FW	(Argentina) ARG	Antonio Barijho	12	5	6	1	6	4
11	DF	(Argentina) ARG	Fernando Navas	25	3	12	3	13	0
	DF	(Argentina) ARG	Adrián Guillermo	6	0	6	0		
24	MF	(Peru) PER	José Pereda	19	0	6	0	13	0
21	FW	(Argentina) ARG	Christian Giménez	10	1	4	1	6	0
	FW	(Argentina) ARG	Fernando Ortiz	1	1	1	1	-	-
28	FW	(Argentina) ARG	Ariel Carreño	1	0	1	0		
16	FW	(Argentina) ARG	Ariel Rosada	2	0	1	0	1	0
22	DF	(Argentina) ARG	Sebastián Battaglia	4	0	0	0	4	0
	GK	(Argentina) ARG	Christian Muñoz	4	0	0	0	4	0
	MF	(Argentina) ARG	Guillermo Valdez	2	0	0	0	2	0
	DF	(Argentina) ARG	Fabricio Coloccini	1	1	0	0	1	1
	MF	(Argentina) ARG	Juan Arostegui	1	0	0	0	1	0
	MF	(Argentina) ARG	Christian Dollberg	1	0	0	0	1	0
	MF	(Argentina) ARG	Iván Furios	1	0	0	0	1	0
	MF	(Argentina) ARG	Esteban José Herrera	1	0	0	0	1	0
