= Otokoré =

Otokoré is a surname. Notable people with the surname include:

- Didier Otokoré (born 1969), Ivorian footballer
- Safia Otokoré (born 1969), French politician
