= 1999 UAE President's Cup final =

- Event: 1998–99 UAE President's Cup
Al Ain	Al Shabab
1	0
- Date: 27 May 1999
- Venue: Al Nahyan Stadium, Abu Dhabi
- Referee: Fareed Ali

The 1999 UAE President's Cup final was the 23rd final of the Emirati competition, the UAE President's Cup. The final was played at Al Nahyan Stadium, in Abu Dhabi, on 27 May 1999. Al Ain beat Al Shabab 1–0 to win their first title.

== Match details ==
27 May 1999

Al Ain	1–0 (a.e.t.)	Al Shabab
H. Mubarak 101'	Report

Al Nahyan Stadium, Abu Dhabi
Attendance: 10,000
Referee: Fareed Ali

GK	1	(United Arab Emirates) Mutaz Abdulla
DF	6	(United Arab Emirates) Mohamed Hamdoon
DF	19	(United Arab Emirates) Fahad Ali (yellow card)
DF	18	(United Arab Emirates) Abdullah Ali (substituted off)
DF	3	(United Arab Emirates) Yousef Hareb (yellow card)
MF	5	(United Arab Emirates) Sultan Rashed
MF	20	(United Arab Emirates) Helal Saeed
MF	10	(Ghana) Abedi Pele (C)
FW	7	(Burkina Faso) Seydou Traoré
FW	23	(United Arab Emirates) Majid Al Owais
FW	13	(United Arab Emirates) Fahad Al Nowais (yellow card) (substituted off)
Substitutes:
GK	22	(United Arab Emirates) Zakria Ahmed
DF	17	(United Arab Emirates) Awad Gharib
DF	4	(United Arab Emirates) Ali Msarri
MF	8	(United Arab Emirates) Jasem Tawfiq
MF	16	(United Arab Emirates) Rami Yaslam
MF	25	(United Arab Emirates) Hamad Mubarak (substituted on)
FW	9	(United Arab Emirates) Musabah Mohamed	Substituted on
Manager:
(Romania) Ilie Balaci

GK	1	(United Arab Emirates) Hassan Al Shareef
DF	6	(United Arab Emirates) Jamal Matar
DF	4	(United Arab Emirates) Ibrahim Habita
DF	21	(United Arab Emirates) Obaid Habita (yellow card) (red card)
DF	25	(United Arab Emirates) Abdullah Darwish (substituted off) 45+1'
MF	16	(United Arab Emirates) Yousef Fikri
MF	17	(United Arab Emirates) Abdulkhaleq Fadel (yellow card) (red card)
MF	9	(United Arab Emirates) Walid Obaid (substituted off)
FW	10	(United Arab Emirates) Bakheet Saad
FW	14	(United Arab Emirates) Khamees Saad (C)
FW	20	(Kuwait) Jasem Al-Huwaidi (yellow card)
Substitutes:
GK	22	(United Arab Emirates) Obaid Al-Taweela
DF	24	(Brazil) Sandro Marcal	Substituted on
DF	2	(United Arab Emirates) Eisa Mohammed	(substituted on) 45+1'
	13	(United Arab Emirates) Ahmed Ibrahim
	18	(United Arab Emirates) Abbas Abdullah
	23	(United Arab Emirates) Mohamed Ali
	11	(United Arab Emirates) Joher Saad
	12	(United Arab Emirates) Eid Salman
Manager:
(United Arab Emirates) Abdullah Saqer

1999 UAE President's Cup winners
Al Ain
1st Title
