= 2003–04 Al Ain FC season =

Al Ain
2003–04 season
- President: Mohammed Bin Zayed
- Manager: Bruno Metsu (from 14 July 2002 until 1 June 2004); Alain Perrin (from 13 July 2004)
- Stadium: Tahnoun bin Mohammed
- UAE Football League: 1st
- President's Cup: Semi-finals
- Top goalscorer: League: Boubacar Sanogo (11); All: Rodrigo Mendes (18)
Home colours

The 2003–04 season was Al Ain Football Club's 36th season in existence and the club's 29th consecutive season in the top-level football league in the UAE.

== Competitions ==
=== Overview ===
Competition	First match	Last match	Starting round	Final position	Record							
Competition	First match	Last match	Starting round	Final position	Pld	W	D	L	GF	GA	GD	Win %
Football League	25 January 2004	24 May 2004	Group stage	Winners	16	11	3	2	34	17	+17	68.75
President's Cup	18 September 2003	25 April 2004	Group stage	Semi-finals	15	9	3	3	33	12	+21	60.00
Total					31	20	6	5	67	29	+38	64.52

Last updated: 24 May 2004
Source: Competitions

=== UAE Football League ===
==== Group stage ====
===== Group A =====
Pos	Team	Pld	W	D	L	GF	GA	GD	Pts
1	Al Ain	10	6	3	1	17	7	+10	21
2	Al Shabab	10	6	1	3	14	9	+5	19
3	Al Jazira	10	5	3	2	16	10	+6	18
4	Al-Nasr	10	4	0	6	13	17	−4	12
5	Al Khaleej	10	2	2	6	10	20	−10	8
6	Sharjah	10	1	3	6	10	17	−7	6

Source: rsssf.org

==== Matches ====
25 January 2004 1	Al Nasr	0–5	Al Ain	Dubai
17:10		Report	Ishak 3', 44'; Mendes 81'; Al-Wehaibi 89'; M. Omar 92'	Stadium: Al Maktoum Stadium

30 January 2004 2	Al Ain	0–0	Sharjah	Al Ain
19:45		Report		Stadium: Tahnoun bin Mohammed

5 February 2004 3	Al Jazira	1–1	Al Ain	Abu Dhabi
17:25	Becerra 19'	Report	Mendes 79'	Stadium: Al Jazira Stadium

22 February 2004 4	Al Khaleej	1–1	Al Ain	Khor Fakkan
17:30	T. Sulaiman 30'	Report	G. Harib 24'

26 February 2004 5	Al Ain	2–1	Al Shabab	Al Ain
19:55	S. Rashed 7'; M. Omar 88'	Report	S. Saad 33'	Stadium: Tahnoun bin Mohammed

9 March 2004 6	Al Ain	2–0	Al Nasr	Al Ain
20:00	S. Khater 16'; Sanogo 32'	Report		Stadium: Tahnoun bin Mohammed

15 March 2004 7	Sharjah	1–2	Al Ain	Sharjah
17:40	El Assas 84'	Report	Sanogo 51'; Mendes 82'	Stadium: Sharjah Stadium

21 March 2004 8	Al Ain	2–1	Al Jazira	Al Ain
20:00	Sanogo 15', 70'	Report	Becerra 47' (pen.)	Stadium: Tahnoun bin Mohammed

7 April 2004 9	Al Ain	2–1	Al Khaleej	Al Ain
19:10	Sanogo 40', 94'	Report	Malallah 42'	Stadium: Tahnoun bin Mohammed

15 April 2004 10	Al Shabab	1–0	Al Ain	Dubai
19:10	Jadílson 76'	Report		Stadium: Maktoum bin Rashid Al Maktoum

==== Championship Playoff ====
Pos	Team	Pld	W	D	L	GF	GA	GD	Pts
1	Al Ain	6	5	0	1	17	10	+7	15
2	Al Ahli	6	4	1	1	17	12	+5	13
3	Al Shabab	6	2	1	3	11	10	+1	7
4	Al Wasl	6	0	0	6	4	17	−13	0

Source: rsssf.org

==== Matches ====
29 April 2004 1	Al Ain	6–4	Al Ahli	Al Ain
19:30	Sanogo 26' (pen.), 57'; M. Omar 41', 63', 78' (pen.); Mendes 75' (pen.)	Report	Mitrović 24', 53'; Karimi 43' (pen.), 71' (pen.)	Stadium: Tahnoun bin Mohammed

4 May 2004 2	Al Shabab	2–3	Al Ain	Dubai
19:10	Geraldo 45'; E. Obaid 88'	Report	M. Omar 30'; Sanogo 46', 89'	Stadium: Maktoum bin Rashid Al Maktoum

9 May 2004 3	Al Ain	4–1	Al Wasl	Al Ain
19:30	Mendes 32', 52'; R. Yaslam 39'; Sanogo 71'	Report	Vahedi 72'	Stadium: Tahnoun bin Mohammed

15 May 2004 4	Al Ahli	1–0	Al Ain	Dubai
19:30	Mitrović 33'	Report		Stadium: Rashid Stadium

20 May 2004 5	Al Ain	2–1	Al Shabab	Al Ain
19:30	M. Omar 29', 87'	Report	Geraldo 45' (pen.)	Stadium: Tahnoun bin Mohammed

24 May 2004 6	Al Wasl	1–2	Al Ain	Dubai
19:30	Fairooz 53'	Report	M. Omar 14', 20'	Stadium: Zabeel Stadium

=== UAE President's Cup ===
==== Group C ====
Team	Pld	W	D	L	GF	GA	GD	Pts
Al Wasl	12	10	1	1	27	13	+14	31
Al Ain	12	7	3	2	29	10	+19	24
Ittihad Kalba	12	7	1	4	29	23	+6	22
Baniyas	12	5	3	4	20	17	+3	18
Hatta	12	4	5	3	20	17	+3	17
Al Urooba	12	2	0	10	19	41	−22	6
Al Arabi	12	0	1	11	12	35	−23	1

Source: rsssf.org

18 September 2003 1	Al Ain	5–1	Ittihad Kalba	Al Ain
19:00	M. Omar 19'; Mendes 67', 71', 88'; Ishak 77'	Report	H. Saeed 27'	Stadium: Tahnoun bin Mohammed; Referee: Abdullah Al Bannai

24 September 2003 2	Al Ain	6–0	Al Urooba	Al Ain
18:55	Mendes 24', 37'; M. Omar 58', 87'; F. Ali 79'	Report		Stadium: Tahnoun bin Mohammed; Referee: Hamad Bin Hanifa

29 September 2003 3	Al Ain	0–0	Hatta	Al Ain
18:45		Report		Stadium: Tahnoun bin Mohammed; Referee: Ali Al Mulla

23 October 2003 7	Al Wasl	2–1	Al Ain	Dubai
18:25	Al Baloshi 46'; Fairooz 57'	Report	H. Abdullah 1'	Stadium: Zabeel Stadium; Referee: Salah Amen

29 October 2003 4	Baniyas	1–4	Al Ain	Abu Dhabi
21:00	Dbash 66'	Report	H. Abdullah 15', 22'; Mendes 65', 84'	Referee: Musallam Ahmad

2 November 2003 5	Al Ain	2–1	Al Arabi	Al Ain
21:00	Mendes 77', 84'	Report	Wahaib 34'	Stadium: Tahnoun bin Mohammed; Referee: Hamad Bin Hanifa

6	Al Ain	bye

6 November 2003 8	Ittihad Kalba	1–1	Al Ain	Kalba
21:00	Khlifi 89'	Report	Al Thaibani 61'	Stadium: Ittihad Kalba Stadium; Referee: Ali Al Mulla

13 November 2003 9	Al Urooba	1–3	Al Ain	Fujairah
21:00	Ricardo 23'	Report	Ishak 8', 64', 89'	Stadium: Al Urooba Club Stadium; Referee: Abdelwahid Khatir

17 December 2003 10	Hatta	2–1	Al Ain	Hatta
18:10 GMT+4 (UAE Time)	S. Amer 13'; Boujara 55'	Report	G. Harib 81'	Stadium: Hamdan Bin Rashid Stadium; Referee: Abdullah Mohammed Al-Shehhi

23 December 2003 11	Al Ain	1–1	Baniyas	Al Ain
18:10	Al Sharji 37'	Report	Al Nofali 77'	Stadium: Tahnoun bin Mohammed; Referee: Ali Al-Badwawi

28 December 2003 12	Al Arabi	0–2	Al Ain	Umm Al Quwain
18:15		Report	Mendes 47'; G. Harib 71'	Stadium: Umm al Quwain Stadium; Referee: Abdelwahid Khatir

13	Al Ain	bye

8 January 2004 14	Al Ain	3–0	Al Wasl	Al Ain
18:25	Ishak 35', 44'; Mendes 37'	Report		Stadium: Tahnoun bin Mohammed; Referee: Mohamed Al Junaibi

19 January 2004 Round of 16	Al Ain	3–1	Al Dhafra	Abu Dhabi
17:30	M. Omar 4'; G. Harib 9'; Ishak 24'	Report	Kambou 59'	Stadium: Al Nahyan Stadium

19 April 2004 Quarter-finals	Al Jazira	1–1 (2–4 p)	Al Ain	Dubai
18:05	Becerra 69'	Report	Mendes 67'	Stadium: Rashid Stadium

25 April 2004 Semi-finals	Al Shaab	0–0 (4–1 p)	Al Ain

== Statistics ==
=== Goalscorers ===
As of 24 May 2004

Includes all competitive matches. The list is sorted alphabetically by surname when total goals are equal.

Rank	Pos.	Player	Football League	President's Cup	Total
1	FW	(Brazil) Rodrigo Mendes	6	12	18
2	FW	(United Arab Emirates) Mohammad Omar	10	4	14
3	FW	(Ivory Coast) Boubacar Sanogo	11	0	11
4	FW	(United Arab Emirates) Naseeb Ishak	2	7	9
5	MF	(United Arab Emirates) Gharib Harib	1	3	4
6	DF	(United Arab Emirates) Hassan Abdullah	0	3	3
7	DF	(United Arab Emirates) Ali Al Sharji	0	1	1
7	MF	(United Arab Emirates) Rami Yaslam	1	0	1
7	FW	(United Arab Emirates) Faisal Ali	0	1	1
7	MF	(United Arab Emirates) Ali Al-Wehaibi	1	0	1
7	MF	(United Arab Emirates) Subait Khater	1	0	1
7	MF	(United Arab Emirates) Sultan Rashed	1	0	1
7	MF	(United Arab Emirates) Salem Johar	0	1	1
7	MF	(United Arab Emirates) Adnan Al Thaibani	0	1	1
Own goals (from the opponents)			0	0	0
Totals			34	33	67
