= 1998 Copa Mercosur =

Copa Mercosur 1998
Tournament details
- Dates: 29 July – 29 December 1998
- Teams: 20 (from 5 associations)

Final positions
- Champions: (Brazil) Palmeiras (1st title)
- Runners-up: (Brazil) Cruzeiro

Tournament statistics
- Matches played: 75
- Goals scored: 218 (2.91 per match)
- Top scorer(s): (Brazil) Alex (Brazil) Fábio Júnior (6 goals each)

The Copa Mercosur 1998 was the first season of the Copa Mercosur, CONMEBOL's club tournament.

The competition started on 29 July 1998 and concluded on 29 December 1998 with Palmeiras beating Cruzeiro in the final.

== Participants ==
Country	Team
Argentina (6 berths)	Boca Juniors
Argentina (6 berths)	Independiente
Argentina (6 berths)	Racing
Argentina (6 berths)	River Plate
Argentina (6 berths)	San Lorenzo
Argentina (6 berths)	Vélez Sársfield
Brazil (7 berths)	Corinthians
Brazil (7 berths)	Cruzeiro
Brazil (7 berths)	Grêmio
Brazil (7 berths)	Flamengo
Brazil (7 berths)	Palmeiras
Brazil (7 berths)	São Paulo
Brazil (7 berths)	Vasco da Gama
Chile (3 berths)	Colo-Colo
Chile (3 berths)	Universidad Católica
Chile (3 berths)	Universidad de Chile
Paraguay (2 berths)	Cerro Porteño
Paraguay (2 berths)	Olimpia
Uruguay (2 berths)	Nacional
Uruguay (2 berths)	Peñarol

== Details ==
- The 20 teams were divided into 5 groups of 4 teams. Each team plays the other teams in the group twice. The top team from each group qualified for the quarter-finals along with the best 3 runners up.
- From the quarter-finals to the final, two legs were played in each round. In the result of a draw, the match was decided by a penalty shoot out.

== Group stage ==
=== Group A ===
Pos	Team	Pld	W	D	L	GF	GA	GD	Pts	Qualification	(Brazil) CRU	(Argentina) SAN	(Brazil) SAO	(Chile) COL
1	(Brazil) Cruzeiro	6	3	1	2	15	7	+8	10	Advance to Quarter-finals	—	2–1	5–1	5–0
2	(Argentina) San Lorenzo	6	3	1	2	11	8	+3	10	Advance to Quarter-finals	2–1	—	3–2	3–0
3	(Brazil) São Paulo	6	2	1	3	8	12	−4	7		1–1	2–1	—	1–0
4	(Chile) Colo-Colo	6	2	1	3	5	12	−7	7		2–1	1–1	2–1	—

=== Group B ===
Pos	Team	Pld	W	D	L	GF	GA	GD	Pts	Qualification	(Brazil) PAL	(Uruguay) NAC	(Argentina) IND	(Chile) UC
1	(Brazil) Palmeiras	6	6	0	0	16	3	+13	18	Advance to Quarter-finals	—	3–1	2–1	1–0
2	(Uruguay) Nacional	6	3	0	3	10	14	−4	9		0–5	—	2–1	1–0
3	(Argentina) Independiente	6	2	0	4	12	15	−3	6		0–3	4–3	—	6–2
4	Universidad de Chile	6	1	0	5	7	13	−6	3		1–2	1–3	3–0	—

=== Group C ===
Pos	Team	Pld	W	D	L	GF	GA	GD	Pts	Qualification	(Argentina) RAC	(Paraguay) OLI	(Brazil) COR	(Uruguay) PEÑ
1	(Argentina) Racing	6	4	2	0	9	4	+5	14	Advance to Quarter-finals	—	1–0	1–0	0–0
2	(Paraguay) Olimpia	6	3	1	2	13	12	+1	10	Advance to Quarter-finals	2–4	—	2–2	4–2
3	(Brazil) Corinthians	6	1	2	3	7	8	−1	5		1–2	1–2	—	1–1
4	(Uruguay) Peñarol	6	0	3	3	6	11	−5	3		1–1	2–3	0–2	—

=== Group D ===
Pos	Team	Pld	W	D	L	GF	GA	GD	Pts	Qualification	(Argentina) VEL	(Argentina) BOC	(Brazil) FLA	(Paraguay) CER
1	(Argentina) Vélez Sársfield	6	3	2	1	7	6	+1	11	Advance to Quarter-finals	—	2–1	1–0	1–1
2	(Argentina) Boca Juniors	6	3	0	3	11	7	+4	9	Advance to Quarter-finals	0–1	—	3–0	3–1
3	(Brazil) Flamengo	6	3	0	3	7	8	−1	9		2–0	0–2	—	2–0
4	(Paraguay) Cerro Porteño	6	1	2	3	9	13	−4	5		2–2	3–2	2–3	—

=== Group E ===
Pos	Team	Pld	W	D	L	GF	GA	GD	Pts	Qualification	(Argentina) RIV	(Brazil) VAS	(Brazil) GRE	(Chile) CAT
1	(Argentina) River Plate	6	2	3	1	8	7	+1	9	Advance to Quarter-finals	—	1–1	3–1	1–1
2	(Brazil) Vasco da Gama	6	2	3	1	4	3	+1	9		0–0	—	1–0	1–0
3	(Brazil) Grêmio	6	2	1	3	10	9	+1	7		2–3	1–0	—	5–1
4	(Chile) Universidad Católica	6	1	3	2	6	9	−3	6		2–0	1–1	1–1	—

=== Ranking of second placed teams ===
Pos	Grp	Team	Pld	W	D	L	GF	GA	GD	Pts	Qualification
1	A	(Argentina) San Lorenzo	6	3	1	2	11	8	+3	10	Advance to Quarter-finals
2	C	(Paraguay) Olimpia	6	3	1	2	13	12	+1	10	Advance to Quarter-finals
3	D	(Argentina) Boca Juniors	6	3	0	3	11	7	+4	9	Advance to Quarter-finals
4	E	(Brazil) Vasco da Gama	6	2	3	1	4	3	+1	9	
5	B	(Uruguay) Nacional	6	3	0	3	10	14	−4	9	

Source: RSSSF
Rules for classification: 1) points in all group matches; 2) total goal differential; 3) total goals scored; 4) lots drawn by CONMEBOL.

== Quarter-finals ==
=== First leg ===
1998-10-29

Palmeiras (Brazil)	3–1	(Argentina) Boca Juniors
Almir 27'; Arílson 48'; Magrão 89'		Rey 51' (pen.)

1998-10-28

River Plate (Argentina)	1–2	(Brazil) Cruzeiro
Gallardo 78' (pen.)		Marcelo 32'; Fábio Júnior 71'

1998-10-27

Vélez Sársfield (Argentina)	3–4	(Paraguay) Olimpia
Husaín 19'; Pandolfi 70'; Bassedas 74'		Caballero 27'; González 55'; Santa Cruz 65'; Paredes 89'

1998-10-29

San Lorenzo (Argentina)	0–0	(Argentina) Racing

=== Second leg ===
1998-11-05

Boca Juniors (Argentina)	1–1	(Brazil) Palmeiras
Palermo 58'		Alex 80'

Palmeiras won 4–2 on aggregate.

1998-11-05

Cruzeiro (Brazil)	2–0	(Argentina) River Plate
Fábio Júnior 36'; Gilberto 83'

Cruzeiro won 4–1 on aggregate.

1998-11-04

Olimpia (Paraguay)	2–1	(Argentina) Vélez Sársfield
Santa Cruz 24' 40'		Camps 65'

Olimpia won 6–4 on aggregate.

1998-11-05

Racing (Argentina)	1–1	(Argentina) San Lorenzo
Delgado 71' (pen.)		Acosta 75'

1–1 on aggregate. San Lorenzo won 2–0 on penalties.

== Semi-finals ==
=== First leg ===
1998-11-10

Palmeiras (Brazil)	2–0	(Paraguay) Olimpia
Alex 45' 49'

1998-11-19

Cruzeiro (Brazil)	1–0	(Argentina) San Lorenzo
Alex Alves 19'

=== Second leg ===
1998-11-17

Olimpia (Paraguay)	0–1	(Brazil) Palmeiras
		Oséas 19'

Match abandoned after 69 minutes due to crowd trouble. Result allowed to stand. Palmeiras won 3–0 on aggregate.

1998-12-02

San Lorenzo (Argentina)	1–1	(Brazil) Cruzeiro
Basavilbazo 38'		Djair 63'

Cruzeiro won 2–1 on aggregate.

== Final ==
=== First leg ===
1998-12-16

Cruzeiro (Brazil)	2–1	(Brazil) Palmeiras
Marcelo 21'; Fábio Júnior 90' (pen.)		Roque Júnior 44'

Mineirão, Belo Horizonte
Attendance: 40,000
Referee: Sidrack Marinho

=== Second leg ===
1998-12-26

Palmeiras (Brazil)	3–1	(Brazil) Cruzeiro
Cléber 7'; Oséas 54'; Paulo Nunes 89'		Fábio Júnior 2' (pen.)

Parque Antárctica, São Paulo
Attendance: 49,400
Referee: Claudio Vinicius Cerdeira

=== Play Off ===
1998-12-29

Palmeiras (Brazil)	1–0	(Brazil) Cruzeiro
Arce 62'

Parque Antárctica, São Paulo
Referee: Luciano Almeida

Copa Mercosur
1998 Winner

Palmeiras
First Title
