= Al Ain FC in international football =

- Club: Al Ain FC
- Most appearances: Omar Abdulrahman (61)
- Top scorer: Omar Abdulrahman; Asamoah Gyan (18)
- First entry: 1995 Asian Cup Winners' Cup
- Latest entry: 2023–24 AFC Champions League

Titles
- Champions League: 2: 2003, 2024
- GCC Champions League: 1: 2001

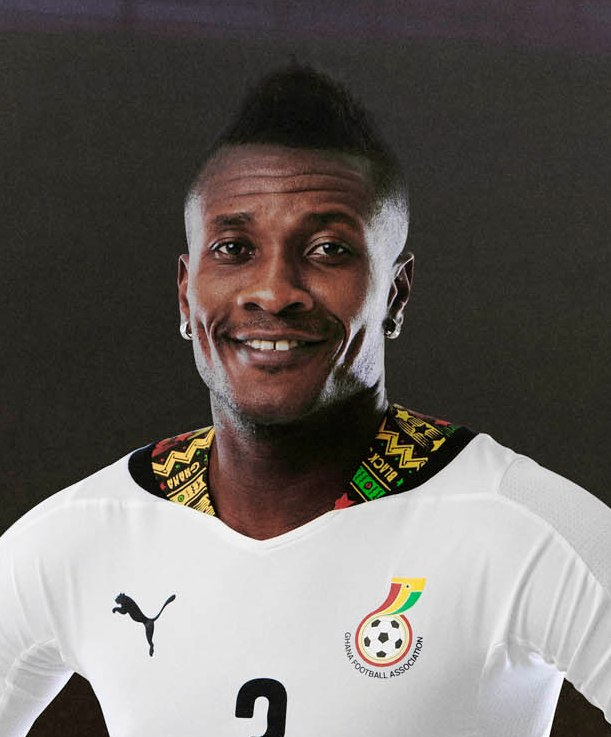
Asamoah Gyan Al Ain's top foreign goalscorer in AFC Champions League with 18 goals

Al Ain FC is an Emirati football club in Al Ain, United Arab Emirates that competes in the UAE Pro League, it has contested in various international competitions and has won two titles so far. It has made the most appearances in the AFC Champions League out any other team in the United Arab Emirates and is by far the only team in the UAE to win a Champions League title after winning the 2003 Asian CL Final.

== History ==
Al Ain first contested participation was in 1995 Asian Cup Winners' Cup where they lost to Kazma SC 0–6 on aggregate. Al Ain won their first international title in the 2001 Gulf Club Champions Cup after finishing first in a round-robin tournament, however only two years later Al Ain would win its first major international title after beating BEC Tero Sasana 2–1 on aggregate, Al Ain became the first Emirati team to win the Asian Cup and is by far the only UAE side to do so in present time. Al Ain would qualify for the final of the ACL twice only to lose both finals. Al Ain also qualified for the 2018 FIFA Club World Cup Final where they lost to Real Madrid CF 1–4.

== Overall record ==
As of 26 June 2025. Legend: GF = Goals For. GA = Goals Against. GD = Goal Difference.

Competition	Played	Won	Drew	Lost	GF	GA	GD	Win%
Club Championship / Champions League (Note: does not include 4 match in play-off round.)	145	61	40	44	237	192	+45	42.07
Cup Winners' Cup	8	3	0	5	7	12	−5	37.50
GCC Champions League	14	5	3	6	13	19	−6	35.71
Arab Champions League	2	1	0	1	2	2	+0	50.00
FIFA Club World Cup	7	2	2	3	11	21	−10	28.57
Total	176	72	45	59	270	246	+24	40.91

=== Participations ===
- W : Withdrew, QS : Qualifying stage, R1 : First round, R2 : Second round, GS : Group stage, R16 : Round of 16, QF : Quarterfinals, SF : Semifinal, R : Runner-up, C : Champions
- ^{RR} Round-robin tournament

Competition	No.	Result																		
AFC Champions League Elite	17																			
AFC Champions League Elite	17	Season	2003	2004	2005	2006	2007	2010	2011	2013	2014	2015	2016	2017	2018	2019	2020	2021	2024	2025
AFC Champions League Elite	17	Round	C	QF	RU	QF	GS	GS	GS	GS	SF	R16	RU	QF	R16	GS	GS	QS	C	GS
Asian Club Championship	2																			
Asian Club Championship	2	Season	1999	2001																
Asian Club Championship	2	Round	3rd	R2																
Asian Cup Winners' Cup	3																			
Asian Cup Winners' Cup	3	Season	1995	2000	2002															
Asian Cup Winners' Cup	3	Round	R2	R1	QF															
Arab Club Champions Cup	3																			
Arab Club Champions Cup	3	Season	2001	2017	2019															
Arab Club Champions Cup	3	Round	W	W	R1															
GCC Club Cup	4																			
GCC Club Cup	4	Edition	1985	1995	2001	2025–26														
GCC Club Cup	4	Round	3rd^{RR}	5th^{RR}	C^{RR}															
FIFA Club World Cup	2																			
FIFA Club World Cup	2	Edition	2018	2025																
FIFA Club World Cup	2	Round	RU	GS																

== International competitions ==
Match won	Match drawn	Match lost	Champions	Runners-up

=== AFC Champions League/AFC Champions League Elite ===
Season	Round	Club	Home	Away	Aggregate
2003	Group stage	(Saudi Arabia) Al-Hilal	1–0		1st
2003	Group stage	(Qatar) Al-Sadd	2–0		1st
2003	Group stage	(Iran) Esteghlal	3–1		1st
2003	Semi-finals	(China) Dalian Shide	4–2	3–4	7–6
2003	Final	(Thailand) BEC Tero Sasana	2–0	0–1	2–1
2004	Quarter-finals	(South Korea) Jeonbuk Hyundai Motors	0–1	1–4	1–5
2005	Group stage	(Syria) Al-Wahda	3–0	3–2	1st
2005	Group stage	(Iran) Sepahan	3–2	1–1	1st
2005	Group stage	(Saudi Arabia) Al-Shabab	3–0	0–1	1st
2005	Quarter-finals	(Iran) PAS Tehran	1–1	3–3	4–4 (a)
2005	Semi-finals	(China) Shenzhen	6–0	0–0	6–0
2005	Final	(Saudi Arabia) Al-Ittihad	1–1	2–4	3–5
2006	Group stage	(Saudi Arabia) Al-Hilal	2–0	1–2	1st
2006	Group stage	(Uzbekistan) Mash'al	2–1	1–1	1st
2006	Group stage	(Iraq) Al-Minaa	2–1	2–1	1st
2006	Quarter-finals	(Kuwait) Al-Qadsia	2–2	0–3	2–5
2007	Group stage	(Saudi Arabia) Al-Shabab	0–2	0–2	3rd
2007	Group stage	(Syria) Al-Ittihad	1–1	0–0	3rd
2007	Group stage	(Iran) Sepahan	3–2	1–1	3rd
2010	Group stage	(Uzbekistan) Pakhtakor	0–1	2–3	4th
2010	Group stage	(Iran) Sepahan	2–0	0–0	4th
2010	Group stage	(Saudi Arabia) Al-Shabab	2–1	2–3	4th
2011	Play off round	(Indonesia) Sriwijaya	4–0		
2011	Group stage	(South Korea) FC Seoul	0–1	0–3	3rd
2011	Group stage	(China) Hangzhou Greentown	1–0	0–0	3rd
2011	Group stage	(Japan) Nagoya Grampus	3–1	0–4	3rd
2013	Group stage	(Saudi Arabia) Al-Hilal	3–1	0–2	3rd
2013	Group stage	(Iran) Esteghlal	0–1	0–2	3rd
2013	Group stage	(Qatar) Al-Rayyan	2–1	1–2	3rd
2014	Group stage	(Qatar) Lekhwiya	2–1	5–0	1st
2014	Group stage	(Saudi Arabia) Al-Ittihad	1–1	1–2	1st
2014	Group stage	(Iran) Tractor Sazi	3–1	2–2	1st
2014	Round of 16	(United Arab Emirates) Al-Jazira	2–1	2–1	4–2
2014	Quarter-finals	(Saudi Arabia) Al-Ittihad	2–0	3–1	5–1
2014	Semi-finals	(Saudi Arabia) Al-Hilal	2–1	0–3	2–4
2015	Group stage	(Saudi Arabia) Al-Shabab	0–0	1–0	1st
2015	Group stage	(Iran) Naft Tehran	3–0	1–1	1st
2015	Group stage	(Uzbekistan) Pakhtakor	1–1	1–0	1st
2015	Round of 16	(United Arab Emirates) Al-Ahli	3–3	0–0	3–3 (a)
2016	Group stage	(Qatar) El-Jaish	1–2	1–2	2nd
2016	Group stage	(Saudi Arabia) Al-Ahli	1–0	2–1	2nd
2016	Group stage	(Uzbekistan) Nasaf Qarshi	2–0	1–1	2nd
2016	Round of 16	(Iran) Zob Ahan	1–1	2–0	3–1
2016	Quarter-finals	(Uzbekistan) Lokomotiv Tashkent	0–0	1–0	1–0
2016	Semi-finals	(Qatar) El-Jaish	3–1	2–2	5–3
2016	Final	(South Korea) Jeonbuk Hyundai Motors	1–1	1–2	2–3
2017	Group stage	(Iran) Zob Ahan	1–1	3–0	1st
2017	Group stage	(Uzbekistan) Bunyodkor	3–0	3–2	1st
2017	Group stage	(Saudi Arabia) Al-Ahli	2–2	2–2	1st
2017	Round of 16	(Iran) Esteghlal	6–1	0–1	6–2
2017	Quarter-finals	(Saudi Arabia) Al-Hilal	0–0	0–3	0–3
2018	Play off round	(Bahrain) Malkiya	2–0		
2018	Group stage	(Saudi Arabia) Al-Hilal	2–1	0–0	2nd
2018	Group stage	(Qatar) Al-Rayyan	1–1	4–1	2nd
2018	Group stage	(Iran) Esteghlal	2–2	1–1	2nd
2018	Round of 16	(Qatar) Al-Duhail	2–4	1–4	3–8
2019	Group stage	(Saudi Arabia) Al-Hilal	0–1	0–2	4th
2019	Group stage	(Iran) Esteghlal	1–2	1–1	4th
2019	Group stage	(Qatar) Al-Duhail	0–2	2–2	4th
2020	Play off round	(Uzbekistan) Bunyodkor	1–0		
2020	Group stage	(Iran) Sepahan	0–4	0–0	4th
2020	Group stage	(Saudi Arabia) Al-Nassr	1–2	1–0	4th
2020	Group stage	(Qatar) Al-Sadd	3–3	0–4	4th
2021	Play off round	(Iran) Foolad	0–4		
2023–24
2023–24	Group stage	(Uzbekistan) Pakhtakor	1–3	3–0	1st
2023–24	Group stage	(Turkmenistan) Ahal	4–2	2–1	1st
2023–24	Group stage	(Saudi Arabia) Al-Fayha	4–1	3–2	1st
2023–24	Round of 16	(Uzbekistan) Nasaf	2–1	0–0	2–1
2023–24	Quarter-finals	(Saudi Arabia) Al-Nassr	1–0	3–4 (a.e.t.)	4–4 (3–1 p)
2023–24	Semi-finals	(Saudi Arabia) Al Hilal	4–2	1–2	5–4
2023–24	Final	(Japan) Yokohama F. Marinos	5–1	1–2	6–3
2024–25
2024–25	League Stage	(Qatar) Al Sadd	1–1	—	8th
2024–25	League Stage	(Qatar) Al Gharafa	—	2–4	8th
2024–25	League Stage	(Saudi Arabia) Al Hilal	4–5	—	8th
2024–25	League Stage	(Saudi Arabia) Al Nassr	—	1–5	8th
2024–25	League Stage	(Saudi Arabia) Al Ahli	1–2	—	8th
2024–25	League Stage	(Uzbekistan) Pakhtakor	—	1–1	8th
2024–25	League Stage	(Qatar) Al Rayyan	1–2	—	8th
2024–25	League Stage	(Iraq) Al Shorta	—	0–2	8th

=== Asian Club Championship ===
Season	Round	Club	Home	Away	Aggregate
1998–99	First round	Oman	5–2	2–0	7–2
1998–99	Second round	(Lebanon) Al-Ansar	3–1	0–1	3–2
1998–99	Group stage	(Turkmenistan) Köpetdag Aşgabat	6–1		1st
1998–99	Group stage	(Iran) Esteghlal	0–1		1st
1998–99	Group stage	(Saudi Arabia) Al-Hilal	1–0		1st
1998–99	Semi-finals	(Japan) Júbilo Iwata	2–2 (p) (2–4)		
1998–99	Third place match	(China) Dalian Shide	3–2		
2000–01	First round	(Iraq) Al-Zawraa	1–2	4–0	5–2
2000–01	Second round	(Iran) Persepolis	0–2	2–2 (a.e.t.)	2–4

=== Asian Cup Winners' Cup ===
Season	Round	Club	Home	Away	Aggregate
1995	Second round	(Kuwait) Kazma	0–4	0–2	0–6
1999–2000	First round	(Syria) Al-Jaish	1–2	1–0	2–2 (a)
2001–2002	Second round	(Jordan) Al-Wehdat	2–0	1–2	3–2
2001–2002	Quarter-finals	(Qatar) Al-Sadd	2–1	0–1	2–2 (a)

=== Arab Club Champions Cup ===
Season	Round	Club	Home	Away	Aggregate
2018–19	First round	(Algeria) ES Sétif	1–2	1–0	2–2 (a)

=== GCC Champions League ===
Season	Round	Club	Home	Away	Aggregate
1985	Group stage	(Saudi Arabia) Al-Ahli	0–2	4–1	3rd
1985	Group stage	(Oman) Fanja	2–3	1–2	3rd
1995	Round robin	(Kuwait) Kazma	0–0		5th
1995	Round robin	(Qatar) Al-Arabi	1–2		5th
1995	Round robin	(Saudi Arabia) Al-Shabab	1–1		5th
1995	Round robin	(Oman) Dhofar	0–0		5th
1995	Round robin	(Bahrain) Riffa	0–2		5th
2001	Round robin	(Bahrain) Riffa	2–1		C
2001	Round robin	(Kuwait) Al-Salmiya	2–1		C
2001	Round robin	(Qatar) Al-Gharafa	1–0		C
2001	Round robin	(Oman) Dhofar	1–0		C
2001	Round robin	(Saudi Arabia) Al-Ittihad	0–2		C

=== FIFA Club World Cup ===
Season	Round	Club	Result
2018	First round	(New Zealand) Team Wellington	3–3 (p) (4–3)
2018	Second round	(Tunisia) Espérance de Tunis	3–0
2018	Semi-finals	(Argentina) River Plate	2–2 (p) (5–4)
2018	Final	(Spain) Real Madrid	1–4
2025	Group G	(Italy) Juventus FC	0–5
2025	Group G	(England) Manchester City F.C.	0–6
2025	Group G	(Morocco) Wydad AC	2–1

== Statistics ==
=== By club ===
Opposition	Played	Won	Drawn	Lost	For	Against	Win%
(Saudi Arabia) Al-Hilal	16	7	2	7	17	20	43.75
(Iran) Esteghlal	10	2	3	5	14	13	20.00
(Saudi Arabia) Al-Shabab	9	3	2	4	9	10	33.33
(Iran) Sepahan	8	3	4	1	10	10	37.50
(Saudi Arabia) Al-Ittihad	7	2	2	3	10	11	28.57
(Saudi Arabia) Al-Ahli	6	2	2	2	8	11	33.33
(Qatar) Al-Sadd	6	2	2	2	8	10	33.33
(Qatar) Al-Duhail	6	2	1	3	12	13	33.33
(Uzbekistan) Pakhtakor	6	2	1	3	8	8	33.33
(Saudi Arabia) Al-Nassr	4	2	0	2	6	6	50.00
(Iran) Zob Ahan	4	2	2	0	7	2	50.00
(Uzbekistan) Nasaf	4	2	2	0	5	2	50.00
(Qatar) Al-Rayyan	4	2	1	1	8	5	50.00
(Qatar) El-Jaish	4	1	1	2	7	7	25.00
(South Korea) Jeonbuk	4	0	1	3	3	8	0.00
(Uzbekistan) Bunyodkor	3	3	0	0	7	2	100.00
(Kuwait) Kazma	3	0	1	2	0	6	0.00
(China) Dalian Shide	3	2	0	1	10	8	66.67
(Saudi Arabia) Al-Fayha	2	2	0	0	7	3	100.00
(Iran) Persepolis	2	0	1	1	2	4	0.00
(Iran) Tractor	2	1	1	0	5	3	50.00
(Iran) Naft Tehran	2	1	1	0	4	1	50.00
(Iran) PAS	2	0	2	0	4	4	0.00
(Uzbekistan) Mash'al	2	1	1	0	3	2	50.00
(Uzbekistan) Lokomotiv	2	1	1	0	1	0	50.00
(Syria) Al-Wahda	2	2	0	0	6	2	100.00
(Syria) Al-Jaish	2	1	0	1	2	2	50.00
(Syria) Al-Ittihad	2	0	2	0	1	1	0.00
(Kuwait) Qadsia	2	0	1	1	2	5	0.00
(China) Shenzhen	2	1	1	0	6	0	50.00
(China) Zhejiang	2	1	1	0	1	0	50.00
(Japan) Nagoya Grampus	2	1	0	1	3	5	50.00
(Japan) Yokohama F. Marinos	2	1	0	1	6	3	50.00
(Turkmenistan) Ahal	2	2	0	0	6	3	100.00
Oman	2	2	0	0	7	2	100.00
(Oman) Dhofar	2	1	1	0	1	0	50.00
(Oman) Fanja	2	1	0	1	4	4	50.00
(Bahrain) Riffa	2	1	0	1	2	3	50.00
(Iraq) Al-Mina'a	2	2	0	0	4	2	100.00
(Iraq) Al-Zawraa	2	1	0	1	5	2	50.00
(South Korea) Seoul	2	0	0	2	0	4	0.00
(United Arab Emirates) Shabab Al Ahli	2	0	2	0	3	3	0.00
(United Arab Emirates) Al-Jazira	2	2	0	0	4	2	100.00
(Jordan) Al-Wehdat	2	1	0	1	3	2	50.00
(Qatar) Al-Gharafa	2	1	0	1	3	4	50.00
(Algeria) ES Sétif	2	1	0	1	2	2	50.00
(Thailand) Police Tero	2	1	0	1	2	1	50.00
(Lebanon) Al-Ansar	2	1	0	1	3	2	50.00
(Iran) Foolad	1	0	0	1	0	4	0.00
(Qatar) Al-Arabi	1	0	0	1	1	2	0.00
(Kuwait) Al-Salmiya	1	1	0	0	2	1	100.00
(Japan) Júbilo Iwata	1	0	1	0	2	2	0.00
(Bahrain) Malkiya	1	1	0	0	2	0	100.00
(Spain) Real Madrid	1	0	0	1	1	4	0.00
(Argentina) River Plate	1	0	1	0	2	2	0.00
(Indonesia) Sriwijaya	1	1	0	0	4	0	100.00
(Turkmenistan) Köpetdag Aşgabat	1	1	0	0	6	1	100.00
(New Zealand) Team Wellington	1	0	1	0	3	3	0.00
(Tunisia) ES Tunis	1	1	0	0	3	0	100.00
(Italy) Juventus	1	0	0	1	0	5	0.00
(England) Manchester City	1	0	0	1	0	6	0.00
(Morocco) Wydad AC	1	1	0	0	2	1	100.00

=== By competition ===
Al Ain FC in international football by competition (Note: included 4 match in play-off round.)
Competition	Played	Won	Drew	Lost	GF	GA	GD	Win%
Club Championship / Champions League	148	64	39	45	243	195	+48	43.24
Cup Winners' Cup	8	3	0	5	7	12	−5	37.50
GCC Champions League	14	5	3	6	13	19	−6	35.71
Arab Champions League	2	1	0	1	2	2	+0	50.00
FIFA Club World Cup	4	1	2	1	9	9	+0	25.00
Total	176	74	44	58	274	237	+37	42.05

As of 25 May 2024.

=== By country ===
Country	Played	Won	Drawn	Lost	For	Against	Win%
Saudi Arabia	44	18	8	18	57	61	40.91
Iran	31	9	14	8	46	41	29.03
Qatar	23	8	5	10	39	41	34.78
Uzbekistan	17	9	5	3	24	14	52.94
China	7	4	2	1	17	8	57.14
South Korea	6	0	1	5	3	12	0.00
Kuwait	6	1	2	3	4	12	16.67
Syria	6	3	2	1	9	5	50.00
Oman	6	4	1	1	12	6	66.67
Japan	5	2	1	2	11	10	40.00
Iraq	4	3	0	1	9	4	75.00
United Arab Emirates	4	2	2	0	7	5	50.00
Bahrain	3	2	0	1	4	3	66.67
Turkmenistan	3	3	0	0	12	4	100.00
Algeria	2	1	0	1	2	2	50.00
Jordan	2	1	0	1	3	2	50.00
Lebanon	2	1	0	1	3	2	50.00
Thailand	2	1	0	1	2	1	50.00
Tunisia	1	1	0	0	3	0	100.00
New Zealand	1	0	1	0	3	3	0.00
Indonesia	1	1	0	0	4	0	100.00
Argentina	1	0	1	0	2	2	0.00
Spain	1	0	0	1	1	4	0.00
Italy	1	0	0	1	0	5	0.00
England	1	0	0	1	0	6	0.00
Morocco	1	1	0	0	2	1	100.00
