= Grigore Arezanov =

Romanian footballer

Personal information
- Full name: Grigore Arezanov
- Date of birth: 28 February 1958
- Place of birth: Jegălia/Călărași, Romania
- Position: Right back

Senior career*
Years	Team	Apps	(Gls)
1975–1983	CIL Sighet		
1983–1985	FC Baia Mare	37	(1)
1985–1987	CIL Sighet		
1989–1990	Minerul Baia Borşa		
1990–1991	CIL Sighet		
- * Club domestic league appearances and goals

Grigore "Gogu" Arezanov (born 28 February 1958, in Jegălia/Călărași, Romania) is a Romanian retired football player, who played as a defender. He was involved in an incident in 1984, in which Universitatea Craiova and Romania national football team player Ilie Balaci suffered a severe cruciate ligament injury.

He was often called in the 80's Vasile Arezanov, but his personal name is Grigore.

== Career ==
Arezanov played, during his professional career, only for teams from Maramureș County. He made his senior debut in 1975, and played eight Divizia B seasons for CIL Sighetu Marmației until he signed with FC Baia Mare, a top-tier team. He made his Divizia A debut on 10 September 1983, in a match against FC Olt Scorniceşti, ended 0–0.

He scored his only Divizia A goal on 21 February 1984, bringing the victory for FC Baia Mare against Universitatea Craiova, in the match in which he injured Ilie Balaci. He played only two seasons at Dealu Florilor, returning to CIL Sighet in 1985. He also had a short spell at Minerul Baia Borşa, in Divizia C.

After his professional retirement, he moved in Hungary, and played, until 2003, at amateur level. He now resides in Sighetu Marmației.

== Ilie Balaci incident ==
On 21 February 1984, in a Divizia A match between his team, FC Baia Mare, and Universitatea Craiova, Grigore Arezanov committed a foul on Romanian international midfielder Ilie Balaci as a result of which Balaci suffered a severe cruciate ligament injury.

Ilie Balaci's injury took him out of action for almost a year, and, because an older meniscus injury, he played only 67 matches in his last five competitive seasons. The midfielder also missed Euro 1984 because of the injury.

After this incident, Arezanov was often named as "Balaci's Executioner" in the match-programmes. In a 2010 interview, Grigore Arezanov stated that his tackle was without intent and Ilie Balaci was, at the date of the match, his football idol.
