= Adrián Guillermo =

Argentine footballer (born 1980)

Sergio Adrián Guillermo (born 15 March 1980) is an Argentine former professional footballer who played as a forward.

== Career ==
Guillermo was nicknamed "Escobillon". He started his career with Argentine side Boca.

Outside of Argentina, he played in Spain, Bolivia, Mexico and Paraguay.
