= Safia Otokoré =

French politician

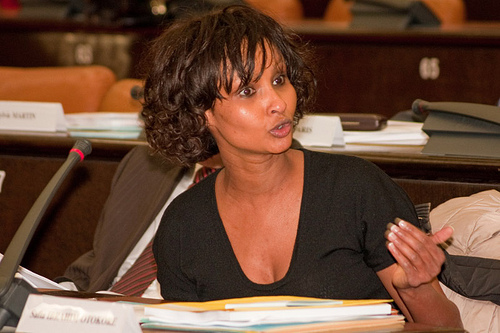
- Safia Otokoré at the Regional Council of Bourgogne-Franche-Comté in 2009
- Born: Safia Ibrahim; October 17, 1969 (age 55); French Territory of the Afars and the Issas
- Spouse: Didier Otokoré

Safia Otokoré (born Safia Ibrahim; October 17, 1969, in the French Territory of the Afars and the Issas, in present-day Djibouti) is a French politician and member of the Socialist Party.

== Biography ==
She was born to parents who were refugees from Somalia. She married Didier Otokoré, who at the time of their marriage played football for AJ Auxerre.

Otokoré ran marathons.

== Political career ==
Otokoré served as a regional councilor, vice president of the regional council, and an advisor for international development for Burgundy.

She was a supporter of Pierre Moscovici and often served as his press officer. In June 2012, she was a member of his ministerial cabinet in charge of communication.

She has consistently spoken out for women's rights and promoted sports.

== Works ==
- Safia Otokoré and Pauline Guéna, Safia: un conte de fées républicain, récit Safia Otokoré (Paris: J'AI LU, 2006) ISBN 2290353000, 978-2290353004—autobiography (in French)
