= Luciano Almeida =

Brazilian footballer (born 1975)

Personal information
- Full name: Luciano Silva Almeida
- Date of birth: April 14, 1975 (age 51)
- Place of birth: Santana do Livramento, Brazil
- Height: 1.80 m (5 ft 11 in)
- Position: Left back

Team information
- Current team: Caxias

Youth career
- 1994–1995: Caxias

Senior career*
| Years | Team | Apps | (Gls) |
| 1996–1997 | Caxias | ? | (?) |
| 1997 | → Internacional | 18 | (0) |
| 1998 | → América-MG | 11 | (0) |
| 1998–1999 | Caxias | ? | (?) |
| 1999–2000 | → Juventude | 8 | (0) |
| 2000–2001 | Caxias | ? | (?) |
| 2001 | Ponte Preta | 0 | (0) |
| 2002 | Goiás | 0 | (0) |
| 2002–2005 | Criciúma | 55 | (5) |
| 2005–2006 | Goiás | 28 | (3) |
| 2007–2008 | Botafogo | 30 | (2) |
| 2009 | Vitória | 4 | (0) |
| 2009– | Caxias | ? | (?) |
- * Club domestic league appearances and goals as of August 16, 2009

Luciano Silva Almeida (born April 14, 1975) is a Brazilian left back. He currently plays for Caxias.

== Honours ==
Internacional

- Rio Grande do Sul State League: 1997

Goiás

- Goiás State League: 2002, 2006
- Brazilian Center-West Cup: 2002

Criciúma

- Brazilian League - Second Division: 2002
- Santa Catarina State League: 2005

Botafogo

- Rio de Janeiro's Cup: 2007, 2008

Vitória

- Bahia State League: 2009
