= Omran Jesmi =

Emirati footballer (born 1976)

Personal information
- Date of birth: 1 September 1976 (age 50)
- Place of birth: United Arab Emirates
- Position: Defender

Senior career*
Years	Team	Apps	(Gls)
2000–2007	Al Shaab		
2007–2012	Al Jazira		

International career
2004	United Arab Emirates	2	(0)
- * Club domestic league appearances and goals

Omran Mohamed Al Jesmi is a UAE football defender who played for United Arab Emirates in the 2004 Asian Cup. He also played for Al Shabab and Al Jazira
