= Abdoulaye Traoré (Burkinabé footballer) =

Burkinabé footballer

Abdoulaye Traore (born 29 November 1974, in Upper Volta) is a retired Burkinabé footballer. He last played as an attacking midfielder for USFAS Bamako.

== Career ==
He requested for his release from Malaysian Super League side Perak FA.

== International career ==
Traoré was a member of the Burkina Faso national football team.

== Clubs ==
- 1997–1998 : (Burkina Faso) USFA Ouagadougou
- 1998–2000 : (United Arab Emirates) Bani Yas Club
- 2000–2001 : (Burkina Faso) ASF Bobo-Dioulasso
- 2001–2006 : (United Arab Emirates) Bani Yas Club
- 2006–2007 : (Malaysia) Perak FA
- 2007–2008 : (Mali) USFAS Bamako
