= Obaid Al-Taweela =

Emirati footballer (born 1976)

Personal information
- Full name: Obaid Mohamed Majid Al-Taweela
- Date of birth: 26 August 1979 (age 47)
- Place of birth: Dubai, UAE
- Height: 1.85 m (6 ft 1 in)
- Position: Goalkeeper

Youth career
- 1988–1999: Dubai

Senior career*
Years	Team	Apps	(Gls)
2000–2005	Dubai	21	(0)
2005	Thun	0	(0)
2006–2013	Al-Ahli	66	(0)
2013–2014	Baniyas	4	(0)
2014–2016	Al-Shaab	43	(0)
2014	→ Al-Wasl (loan)	2	(0)

International career
2008–2012	UAE	5	(0)
- * Club domestic league appearances and goals

Obaid Al-Taweela is a retired football player from the United Arab Emirates, who played for Dubai, Thun, Al-Ahli, Baniyas and Al-Shaab. He was also loaned to Al-Wasl.
