= Slaviša Mitrović =

Bosnia and Herzegovina footballer

Personal information
- Date of birth: July 5, 1977 (age 49)
- Place of birth: Visoko, SFR Yugoslavia
- Height: 1.92 m (6 ft 3 1/2 in)
- Position: Forward

Youth career
- Szeged

Senior career*
Years	Team	Apps	(Gls)
1993–1994	Szeged		
1994–1995	Bečej	0	(0)
1996	Nyíregyháza		
1999–2004	Național București	63	(18)
2002	→ Suwon Bluewings (loan)	7	(0)
2004	Național București	9	(4)
2004	Al-Ahli		
2004–2005	Național București		
2005–2006	Al-Wahda		
2006–2007	Al-Wakrah		
2007	Concordia Chiajna		
Total		79	(22)
- * Club domestic league appearances and goals

Slaviša Mitrović (Славиша Митровић; born July 5, 1977) is a retired Bosnian-Herzegovinian Serb footballer.

== Club career ==
A big forward, Mitrović played in the UAE League with Alahli and Al-Wahda (UAE) and in Romanian League with Național București and in the Second Division with SC Concordia Chiajna. He was the second top scorer with Alahli in UAE League with 19 goals.
