= Mrad Mahjoub =

Tunisian football manager

Personal information
- Date of birth: 1945 (age 80–81)

Managerial career
- Years: Team
- c. 1985: Tunisia U20
- 1992–1993: Tunisia
- 2000–2001: Al Ain
- 2005: Espérance
- 2006–2007: CS Sfaxien
- 2008–2009: Al Ahli
- 2010: Club Africain

Mrad Mahjoub (born 1945) is a Tunisian football manager. He managed Tunisia at the 1985 FIFA World Youth Championship and later the full national team, as well as Tunisia's largest football clubs.
