= 18th GCC Club Championship =

2001 GCC Club Championship
Tournament details
- Host country: United Arab Emirates
- Dates: 3–14 January 2001
- Teams: 6 (from AFC/UAFA confederations)

Final positions
- Champions: (United Arab Emirates) Al Ain (1st title)
- Runners-up: (Saudi Arabia) Al-Ittihad

The 18th GCC Club Championship (Arabic: بطولة الأنديـة الخليجية أبطال الدوري) was the eighteenth edition of the GCC Club Championship for clubs of the Gulf Cooperation Council nations.

The competition started on January 3, 2001, and concluded on January 14, in which Al Ain lifted the trophy for the first time ever.

== Results ==
Team	Pts	Pld	W	D	L	GF	GA	GD
(United Arab Emirates) Al Ain	12	5	4	0	1	6	4	+2
(Saudi Arabia) Al Ittihad	10	5	3	1	1	10	1	+9
(Oman) Dhofar	10	5	3	1	1	6	4	+2
(Kuwait) Al Salmiya	5	5	1	2	2	5	6	−1
(Qatar) Al Gharafa	4	5	1	1	3	7	7	0
(Bahrain) Riffa	1	5	0	1	4	5	17	−12

All match were played in United Arab Emirates.

=== Round 1 ===
3 January 2001

Al Ain (United Arab Emirates)	2–1	(Bahrain) Riffa
S. Khater 52'; Joher 85'		H. Husain 81'

Tahnoun bin Mohammed, Al Ain
4 January 2001

Al Salmiya (Kuwait)	1–0	(Saudi Arabia) Al Ittihad
Al-Huwaidi 30'		Al-Sadiq (red card) 26'

4 January 2001

Dhofar (Oman)	2–1	(Qatar) Al Gharafa

=== Round 2 ===
6 January 2001

Riffa (Bahrain)	1–4	(Qatar) Al Gharafa

6 January 2001

Al Ain (United Arab Emirates)	2–1	(Kuwait) Al Salmiya
S. Khater 48'; Harib 69'		Al-Huwaidi 81'

Tahnoun bin Mohammed, Al Ain
7 January 2001

Dhofar (Oman)	0–0	(Saudi Arabia) Al Ittihad

=== Round 3 ===
8 January 2001

Al Ain (United Arab Emirates)	1–0	(Qatar) Al Gharafa
Harib 45'

Tahnoun bin Mohammed, Al Ain
9 January 2001

Dhofar (Oman)	1–0	(Kuwait) Al Salmiya

9 January 2001

Riffa (Bahrain)	0–7	(Saudi Arabia) Al Ittihad

=== Round 4 ===
11 January 2001

Riffa (Bahrain)	1–1	(Kuwait) Al Salmiya

11 January 2001

Al Gharafa (Qatar)	0–1	(Saudi Arabia) Al Ittihad

12 January 2001

Al Ain (United Arab Emirates)	1–0	(Oman) Dhofar
F. Ali 12'

Tahnoun bin Mohammed, Al Ain

=== Round 5 ===
13 January 2001

Al Salmiya (Kuwait)	2–2	(Qatar) Al Gharafa

14 January 2001

Dhofar (Oman)	3–2	(Bahrain) Riffa

14 January 2001

Al Ain (United Arab Emirates)	0–2	(Saudi Arabia) Al Ittihad

Tahnoun bin Mohammed, Al Ain
