= Emiliano Rey =

Argentine footballer

Emiliano Juan Rey (born January 1, 1975, in Mar del Plata, Buenos Aires) is an Argentine former footballer who played for clubs in Argentina, Chile, Colombia, Ecuador, Peru, Italy and United Arab Emirates.

== Teams ==
- (Argentina) Boca Juniors 1997–1998
- (Ecuador) Barcelona 1998
- (Colombia) Deportivo Cali 1999
- Universidad de Chile 1999
- (Italy) Torres Sassari 2002
- (United Arab Emirates) Al Ain 2003
- (Argentina) Aldosivi de Mar del Plata 2003–2005
- (Argentina) Cadetes de Mar del Plata 2006

== Titles ==
- Universidad de Chile 1999 (Chilean Primera División Championship)
