= Didier Otokoré =

Ivorian footballer (born 1969)

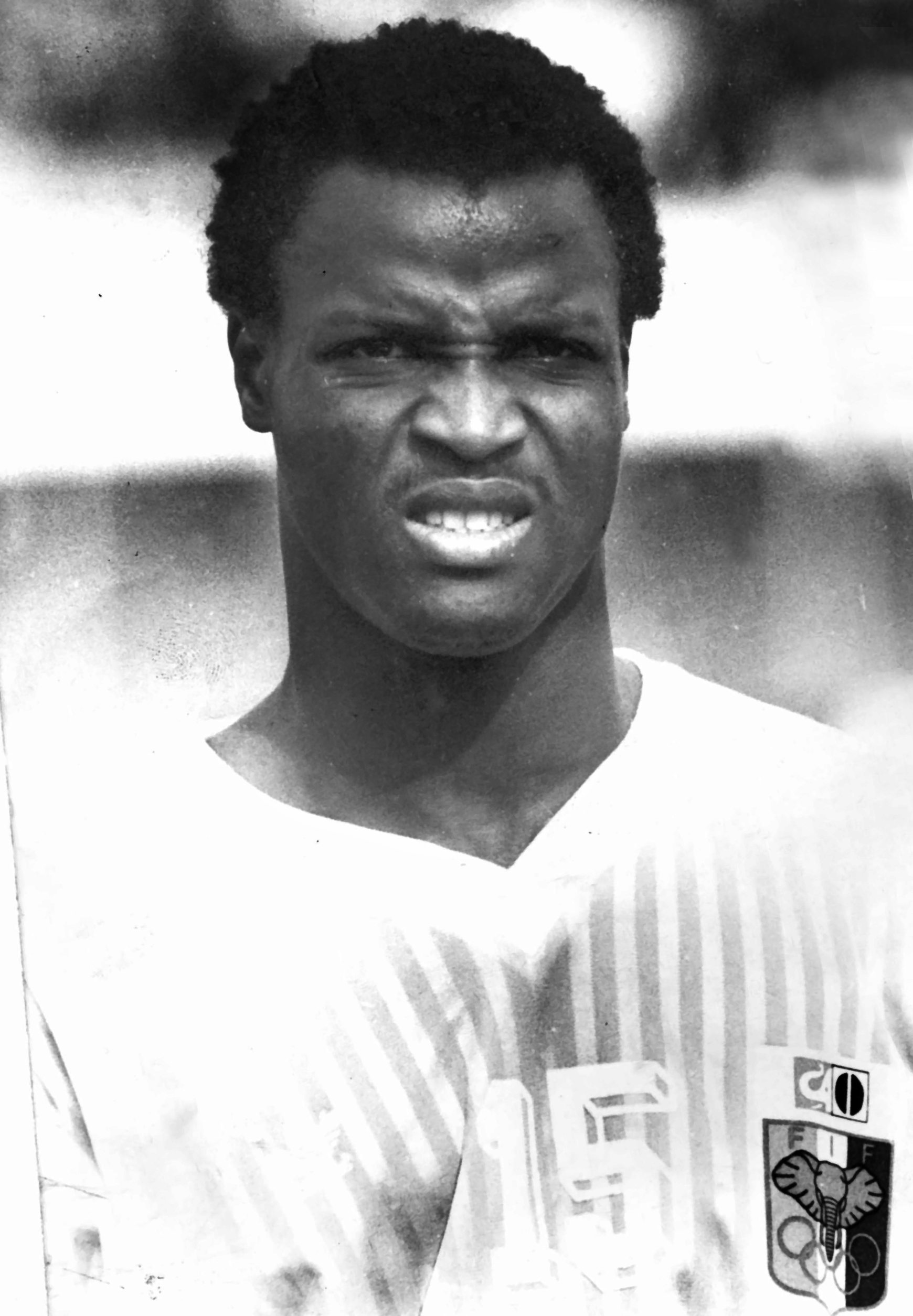

Personal information
- Full name: Didier Otokoré
- Date of birth: 26 March 1969 (age 57)
- Place of birth: Gagnoa, Ivory Coast
- Height: 1.70 m (5 ft 7 in)
- Position: Attacking midfielder

Youth career
- 1984–1985: Stade Abidjan
- 1985–1987: Auxerre

Senior career*
Years	Team	Apps	(Gls)
1987–1993	Auxerre	97	(12)
1993	Sochaux	11	(1)
1993–1994	Cannes	11	(0)
1994–1995	Guingamp	13	(1)
1995–1996	Auxerre	0	(0)
1996–1998	Louhans-Cuiseaux	57	(2)
1998–1999	Al Wasl		
1999–2000	Al-Fujairah SC		
2000–2001	Bourg-Peronnas	24	(3)

International career
1988–1993	Ivory Coast	67	(6)
- * Club domestic league appearances and goals

Didier Otokoré (born 26 March 1969) is an Ivorian retired footballer who played mostly as an attacking midfielder.

Best known for his spell with AJ Auxerre, he spent most of his career in France.

== Club career ==
Otokoré was signed at just 16 by AJ Auxerre, going on to finish his football grooming in the club's youth system, under first-team coach Guy Roux. Never an undisputed starter during his six years in the main squad (tops 23 Ligue 1 matches in 1989–90, mostly as a substitute), he did manage to be relatively used. Also, during that season, but in the UEFA Cup, he arguably had his most memorable performance for the club, scoring twice in a 3–1 win at NK Dinamo Zagreb, after a 0–1 home loss.

Otokoré then split 1993–94 with FC Sochaux-Montbéliard and AS Cannes, returning two years later to Auxerre, without any impact. After a couple of seasons in the second level with CS Louhans-Cuiseaux, he took his game to the United Arab Emirates, then returned in 2000 to France, with amateurs FC Bourg-Peronnas, retiring in 2001.

== International career ==
After he had already lived for the requested years in France, Otokoré was eligible to represent France internationally, being summoned for its Espoirs in February 1988; however, a judicial battle between both Football Federations ensued, and the player ended up playing for the Ivory Coast; in his first match, at the 1988 African Cup of Nations, on 16 March, against Zaire, he played 60 minutes, being immediately sent home afterwards.

Otokoré also represented his nation at the 1992 edition.

== Personal life ==
Otokoré holds Ivorian and French nationalities.

He is married to Safia Otokoré, a French politician.
