= Ilie Balaci =

Romanian footballer and manager (1956–2018)

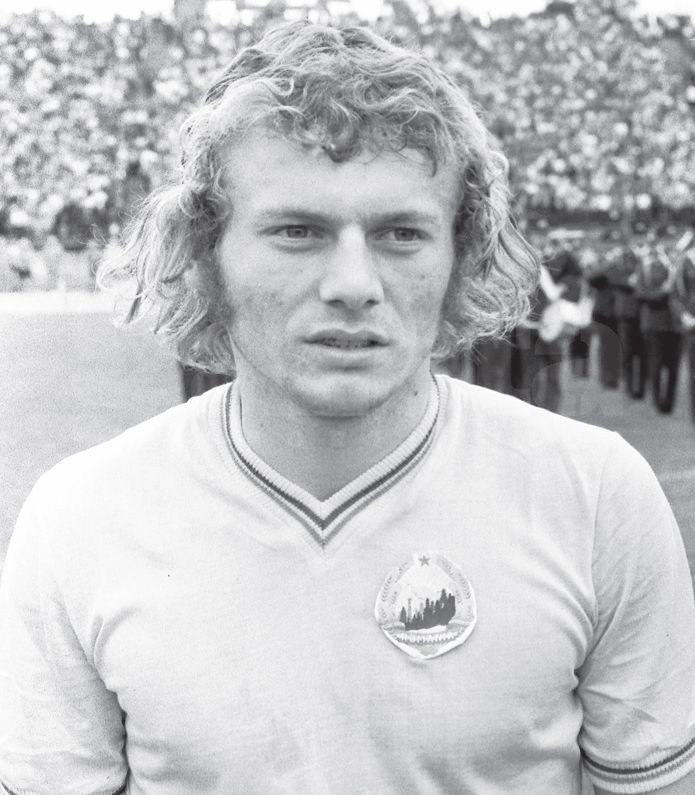
- Balaci with Romania in the 1970s

Personal information
- Date of birth: 13 September 1956
- Place of birth: Bistreț, Romania
- Date of death: 21 October 2018 (aged 62)
- Place of death: Craiova, Romania
- Height: 1.71 m (5 ft 7 in)
- Position: Midfielder

Youth career
- 1965–1973: Universitatea Craiova

Senior career*
Years	Team	Apps	(Gls)
1973–1984	Universitatea Craiova	285	(76)
1985–1986	Olt Scornicești	30	(7)
1986–1988	Dinamo București	32	(1)
1988–1989	Pandurii Târgu Jiu	7	(0)
1989–1990	Drobeta Turnu-Severin	10	(5)
Total		364	(89)

International career
1974–1986	Romania	65	(8)

Managerial career
- 1988–1989: Pandurii Târgu Jiu
- 1989–1991: Drobeta Turnu-Severin
- 1991–1992: Club Africain
- 1992–1994: Olympique Casablanca
- 1994–1996: Al Shabab
- 1996–1997: Al-Nassr
- 1997–1998: Al Hilal
- 1998: Universitatea Craiova
- 1998–2000: Al Ain
- 2000–2001: Al Hilal
- 2001: Universitatea Craiova
- 2001–2002: Al Sadd
- 2002–2003: Al Hilal
- 2003–2005: Al-Ahli
- 2005–2006: Al-Arabi
- 2006: Al Shabab
- 2007–2009: Universitatea Craiova (general manager)
- 2009–2010: Kazma
- 2011: Raja Casablanca
- 2013: Al-Nahda
- 2016: Al-Hilal Omdurman
- 2017–2018: Al-Suwaiq
- * Club domestic league appearances and goals

Ilie Balaci (Romanian pronunciation: [iˈli.e ˈbalatʃʲ]; 13 September 1956 – 21 October 2018) was a Romanian professional football player and manager.

A midfielder, he spent 12 of his 15 years as a professional with Universitatea Craiova, appearing in more than 300 official games with the club and winning seven major titles. Nicknamed Minunea blondă ("the Blonde Wonder"), Balaci is considered one of the greatest Romanian footballers of all time.

== Club career ==
Balaci was a product of Universitatea Craiova's youth system, where he started to play football at age 9. He made his Divizia A debut on 12 August 1973, when Universitatea's coach Constantin Cernăianu used him as a starter in a 1–1 draw against Jiul Petroșani at the age of 16. On 25 November he scored his first goal when he opened the score after 40 seconds, defeating goalkeeper Vasile Stan with a 25-meter shot in an eventual 2–1 loss to Nicolae Dobrin's Argeș Pitești. He managed to win the league title in his first season, contributing with three goals scored in 27 appearances. In the same season, he played four games in the UEFA Cup campaign, as "U" Craiova got past Fiorentina in the first round, being eliminated in the following one by Standard Liège.

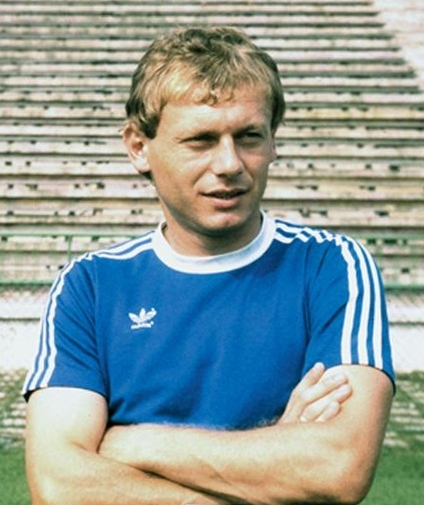
Balaci with Universitatea Craiova

Balaci went on to play twelve seasons for "U" Craiova, being part of the "Craiova Maxima" generation, helping them win two consecutive league titles in 1980 and 1981. At the first one he contributed with six goals scored in the 26 appearances given to him by coach Valentin Stănescu and in the second he netted 12 goals in the 29 matches coach Ion Oblemenco used him. He also won the Cupa României four times, playing in all the finals, opening the score in the 2–1 win against Steaua București in the one in 1977 and he netted a brace in the 6–0 victory over Politehnica Timișoara in the 1981 final.

Balaci played a total of 35 games and scored seven goals for "U" Craiova in European competitions. In the second round of the 1979–80 UEFA Cup he netted a goal in the 4–0 aggregate win over Leeds United, as Universitatea became the first Romanian club that eliminated a team from England in European competitions. Afterwards, they reached the quarter-finals in the 1981–82 European Cup by eliminating Olympiacos and Kjøbenhavns Boldklub, with Balaci scoring once against the latter, being eliminated with 3–1 on aggregate by Bayern Munich. He was an integral part of the team that reached the 1982–83 UEFA Cup semi-finals, appearing in seven matches in the campaign, scoring three goals against Shamrock Rovers, Fiorentina and one from a free kick in the second leg of the semi-final against Benfica, as the team got eliminated after 1–1 on aggregate on the away goal rule.

In December 1982, he signed a pre-contract with Italian side AC Milan, but the transfer did not materialize because Romania's communist regime did not allow it. On 21 February 1984 in a FC Baia Mare – "U" Craiova league match, Baia Mare's defender Grigore Arezanov gave a hard tackle with both feet on Balaci's leg which caused him an injury from which he never completely recovered.

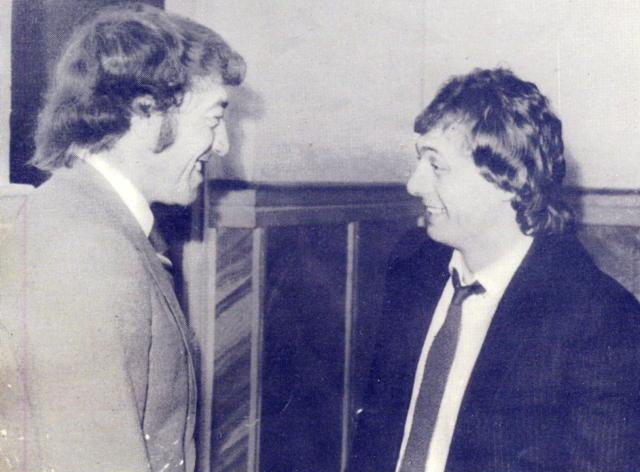
Balaci (right) pictured with Nicolae Dobrin

In the middle of the 1984–85 season, Balaci transferred from Universitatea Craiova to Olt Scornicești, where he spent one and a half seasons with 30 Divizia A appearances in which he scored seven goals. Then, he switched teams again, moving in the 1986–87 season to Dinamo București. He spent two seasons at Dinamo, under the leadership of Mircea Lucescu, appearing in 32 Divizia A games in which he scored one goal, and also making three appearances in European competitions. However, Balaci did not win any major trophies whilst he was playing for Dinamo. He eventually ended his career, after spending two years as a player-coach in the second league at Pandurii Târgu Jiu and Drobeta Turnu-Severin respectively. During his whole career, Balaci played 347 Divizia A matches in which he scored 84 goals and he was the Romanian Footballer of the Year in 1981 and 1982.

== International career ==
Balaci played 65 matches and scored eight goals for Romania, making his debut on 23 March 1974, aged 17, under coach Valentin Stănescu in a 1–0 friendly loss to France. He played three games in the Euro 1976 qualifiers and scored his first goal for the national team at age 20 in a 3–2 friendly loss to Czechoslovakia. Subsequently, he played one game in the 1973–76 Balkan Cup, five matches in which he scored one goal in the 1977–80 Balkan Cup, three in the 1978 World Cup qualifiers, two in the Euro 1980 qualifiers and seven games with one goal netted in the 1982 World Cup qualifiers.

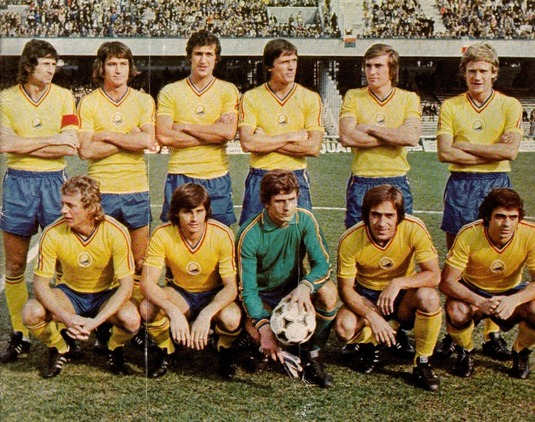
Balaci (bottom row, first from left) with Romania at the Stadio San Paolo in Naples, Italy, February 1980.

Balaci became captain of the national team during the successful Euro 1984 qualifiers, where he played six matches. Among these games was a praised performance in Romania's 1–0 victory against World Cup holders Italy, where he assisted László Bölöni's goal, showcased his dribbling abilities, and excelled against his direct opponent Claudio Gentile. However, coach Mircea Lucescu could not select him in the squad for the final tournament due to the injury he suffered in a Divizia A match from Grigore Arezanov. He played one match in the 1986 World Cup qualifiers and made his last appearance for the national team on 10 September 1986 in a 4–0 victory against Austria in the Euro 1988 qualifiers.

For helping his country qualify to Euro 1984, Balaci was decorated by President of Romania Traian Băsescu on 25 March 2008 with the Ordinul "Meritul Sportiv" – (The Medal "The Sportive Merit") class III. In 2022, the International Federation of Football History & Statistics (IFFHS) included Balaci in its "Romania's all-time dream team" first XI.

== Managerial career ==
After retiring as a footballer, Balaci went on to coach lower league sides Pandurii Târgu Jiu and Drobeta-Turnu Severin. In 1991, he coached clubs in North Africa and the Arab world, he became one of the most successful managers there having won over 22 major trophies domestic and international.

He took charge of Tunisia's Club Africain and Moroccan club Olympique Casablanca in the early 1990s guiding them to their first African Champions League, the league title and the Tunis Cup. He then managed UAE, Qatari and Saudi Arabian clubs Al Shabab, Al Nassr, Al Hilal, Al Ain and Al Sadd winning the championship and domestic cup with each side. At the beginning of the 1998–99 Divizia A season, Balaci was put in charge of Universitatea Craiova but after a 1–0 loss against Oțelul Galați in the 7th round, he lost his temper and threw a pair of football shoes in referees Aron Huzu's head for which he received a one year suspension, after which he decided to resign. In the second half of the 2000–01 Divizia A season, Balaci returned to Universitatea Craiova but his second spell lasted only a month. In June 2003, he was appointed manager of Al Ahli until January 2005, where he won the UAE President's Cup. He then went on to join Qatari side Al-Arabi in the 2005–06 season, before moving to the United Arab Emirates club Al Shabab for a second spell, but without success. In August 2007, Balaci was hired as general manager of Universitatea Craiova whom he also coached in two periods, and remained there for two seasons. On 22 July 2009, Balaci was named head coach of Kuwait club Kazma. He had an impressive start with the Kuwaiti side at the 2010 AFC Cup.

On 11 July 2011, he returned to Morocco signing for Raja Casablanca but was sacked following a financial dispute with the club in September after just two months. Raja appointed Bertrand Marchand as his replacement.

On 4 June 2013, Balaci signed a contract with newly promoted Saudi Premier League side Al-Nahda saving the club from relegation. In September 2013, he was sacked as coach due to a poor start to the season with only one point from the first four matches.

In April 2016, he took over the head coach position at Omdurman-based club Al-Hilal. Balaci was sacked in September 2016 after the team clinched the title with three games left to play. Balaci thought that the club's owners did not want the title win associated with his name.

In July 2017, Balaci was unveiled as the new manager of Omani side Al-Suwaiq. Although the team was assured of top of the championship with 38 points from 15 games Balaci decided to terminate his contract in March 2018 with 12 games left on the season.

== Personal life and death ==
Balaci said that he was born on 8 September 1956 but his birth date was declared by his relatives to the People's Council only on 13 September 1956. He had two daughters; the elder, Lorena, was married to footballer Eugen Trică and divorced in 2015, the younger, Liana, is a former professional tennis player married to fellow tennis player Adrian Ungur.

Balaci died of a myocardial infarction on 21 October 2018, aged 62, while visiting his mother in Craiova.

== Playing statistics ==
Scores and results list Romania's goal tally first, score column indicates score after each Balaci goal.

List of international goals scored by Ilie Balaci
#	Date	Venue	Cap	Opponent	Score	Result	Competition
1	6 October 1976	Letenský Stadion, Prague, Czechoslovakia	11	Czechoslovakia	1–0	2–3	Friendly
2	3 May 1978	Stadionul 23 August, Bucharest, Romania	22	Bulgaria	2–0	2–0	1977–80 Balkan Cup
3	21 March 1979	Stadionul Steaua, Bucharest, Romania	24	Greece	2–0	3–0	Friendly
4	9 September 1981	Stadionul 23 August, Bucharest, Romania	39	Bulgaria	1–0	1–2	Friendly
5	10 October 1981	Stadionul 23 August, Bucharest, Romania	41	Switzerland	1–0	1–2	1982 World Cup qualifiers
6	1 September 1982	Stadionul 23 August, Bucharest, Romania	51	Denmark	1–0	1–0	Friendly
7	9 March 1983	Stadionul 23 August, Târgu Mureș, Romania	56	Turkey	1–0	3–1	Friendly
8	9 March 1983	Stadionul 23 August, Târgu Mureș, Romania	56	Turkey	2–0	3–1	Friendly

== Managerial overview ==
Season	Club	Titles
1988–89	Pandurii Târgu Jiu	
1989–90	Drobeta Turnu-Severin	
1990–91	Drobeta Turnu-Severin	
1991–92	Club Africain	CAF Champions League, Afro-Asian Club Championship, Tunisian League, Tunisia Cup
1992–93	Olympique Casablanca	Arab Cup Winners' Cup, Moroccan Cup
1993–94	Olympique Casablanca	Arab Cup Winners' Cup, Moroccan League
1994–95	Al Shabab	UAE Pro-League
1995–96	Al Shabab	UAE President's Cup
1996–97	Al Nasr	Gulf Club Champions Cup
1997–98	Al Hilal	Gulf Club Champions Cup, Saudi Premier League
1998–99	Universitatea Craiova	
1998–99	Al Ain	UAE President's Cup
1999–00	Al Ain	UAE Pro-League
2000–01	Al Hilal	Arab Cup Winners' Cup, Asian Super Cup
2000–01	Universitatea Craiova	
2001–02	Al Sadd	Arab Champions League, Emir of Qatar Cup
2002–03	Al Hilal	Saudi Crown Prince Cup
2003–04	Al Ahli	UAE President's Cup
2004–05	Al Ahli	
2005–06	Al Arabi	
2006–07	Al Shabab	
2009–10	Kazma	
2011–12	Raja Casablanca	
2013–14	Al-Nahda	
2016	Al-Hilal Omdurman	Sudan Premier League
2017–18	Al-Suwaiq Club	

== Honours ==
=== Player ===
Universitatea Craiova

- Divizia A: 1973–74, 1979–80, 1980–81
- Cupa României: 1976–77, 1977–78, 1980–81, 1982–83

Romania

- Balkan Cup: 1977–80

=== Individual ===
- Romanian Footballer of the Year: 1981, 1982
