= Juma Mossi =

Burundian footballer

Personal information
- Date of birth: 7 July 1973 (age 53)
- Position: Striker

Youth career
- 1988–1989: Union Sporting de Bujumbura

Senior career*
Years	Team	Apps	(Gls)
1989–1993	Vital'O	193	(98)
1993–1997	FC 105 Libreville	202	(102)
1997–1998	Jomo Cosmos	5	(3)
1998–1999	Y.R. K.V. Mechelen	38	(15)
1999–2001	Al-Nasr	157	(50)
2001–2002	Al Ain	82	(20)
2001–2002	Al Ahli SC	32	(15)
2002–2003	Qatar SC	30	(14)
2002–2003	Dubai Club	27	(19)
2005–2006	K. Rupel Boom FC	13	(4)

International career^{‡}
1992–	Burundi	47	(27)
- * Club domestic league appearances and goals as of 12 February 2014 ‡ National team caps and goals as of 12 February 2014

Juma Mossi (born 7 July 1973) is a Burundian retired footballer who served as captain of the Burundian national team. Having been given the nickname "Mossi" in recognition of his superior ability that evoked comparisons to Brazilian footballer Pelé, he is considered by many Burundian football experts to be the greatest Burundian footballer of all time. He found fame in Gabon's Ligue 1 with FC 105 de Libreville and Overseas.

His sons, Hilali Mwamba Mossi and Juma Mossi Junior have also become footballers; Juma Mossi Junior has started with Anderlecht fc Football Academy in Belgium, and Hilali Mossi playing the second division SC Eendracht Aalst in Belgium.

== Early life ==
Juma Mossi was born into a family in the town of Bujumbura, and grew up in the town of Buyenzi at the western outskirts of the city Bujumbura.

== Playing career ==
While he was young, playing in the Union Sporting Bujumbura, it was under the order of coach Piere Nkurunziza, President of the Republic of Burundi.

Juma Mossi was one of the pioneers of Burundi football in the world. One of the first great Burundian players to make an impact on African, Asian, and European club football, he played for teams in Belgium, Qatar, and most famously in Africa, where he was very instrumental as one of the first exports of Burundian football. He started his career with Vital'O and helped them reach the 1992 African Cup Winners' Cup. He had then a stint with FC 105 Libreville in Gabon, followed by a professional career in South Africa with Jomo Cosmos. Mossi played also at the professional level for Y.R. K.V. Mechelen in Belgium before being lured by the petro-dollars in Dubai where he played respectively for Al-Nasr Dubai, Al-Ain Dubai and Al-Ahli Doha and Qatar Sports Club .

Amongst his international accolades, he was often included in Burundian National Football League as The best player and Top Scorer with Vital'O FC and in Gabon National Football League as The best player and Top Scorer with FC 105 de Libreville also and captained since 1992 up 2003 the Burundian Football Nation Team Intamba M'Urugamba,

He left Vital'O after the 1992 African Champions League lost against Africa Sport D'Abidja to join FC 105 de Libreville in Gabon.

Juma Mossi went on to sign a two-year contract with Al Ain Club in the United Arab Emirates and was nominated one of the best foreign players to play in the UAE league.

He was the captain of Burundian's national football team for eleven years (1992–2003) and was one of the first Burundian football players to earn a top placing in Burundian National Football League of the Year voting in 1993 and 1994. He is arguably Burundian's most decorated and honoured football player ever, winning the Burundian Football Magazine of the Year Award three times.

At the club level, he was a key figure in Vital'O's dominance of the National league – resulting in four league championships and one African Champions League final appearance. An attacking strcker, Mossi became as famous for his sublime dribbling skills, as he did for his knack for scoring spectacular and often very important goals. Many such goals became regular "Goals of the Week" on RTNB's weekly "Burundian Football" program. At Bujumbura, he was a member of the team's "Magical Trio", along with Marik Djabile and Mbuyi Jean Marie.

== International career ==
Mossi starred in the Burundian national team that almost qualified for the African Nations Cup in 1993, only to lose in the penalties against Titi Camara's Guinea.
