= Seydou Traoré (footballer) =

Burkinabé footballer (born 1970)

Personal information
- Date of birth: September 17, 1970 (age 56)
- Place of birth: Grand Lahou, Ivory Coast
- Height: 1.82 m (6 ft 0 in)
- Position: Forward

Senior career*
Years	Team	Apps	(Gls)
1985–1993	Africa Sports		
1994	RC Kadiogo		
1995–1998	FC Bressuire		
1998–1999	Al-Ahli Dubai		
1999	Al-Ain		
1999–2000	Qatar SC		
2000–2001	Al-Ahli ad-Dōḥa		
2002	Al-Ain		
2002–2007	Al-Qadisiya		
2007–2008	AS Taissy	2	(0)

International career
1994–2001	Burkina Faso	42	(5)
- * Club domestic league appearances and goals

Seydou Traoré (born September 17, 1970) is a former professional footballer who played as a forward. Born in Ivory Coast, he played for the Burkina Faso national team at international level.

== Career ==
Traoré played for FC Bressuire, Qatar SC, Al-Ain and Al-Qadisiya.

He played for the Burkina Faso national team at the 2000 African Cup of Nations.
