= 1958 FIFA World Cup qualification (UEFA) =

Tournament details
- Dates: 30 September 1956 - 5 February 1958
- Teams: 27 (from 1 confederation)

Tournament statistics
- Matches played: 54
- Goals scored: 228 (4.22 per match)
- Attendance: 2,784,921 (51,573 per match)
- Top scorer: (England) Tommy Taylor (8 goals)

Listed below are the dates and results for the 1958 FIFA World Cup qualification rounds for the European zone (UEFA). For an overview of the qualification rounds, see the article 1958 FIFA World Cup qualification.

== Format ==
Sweden, the hosts of the World Cup, and West Germany, the defending champions, qualified automatically for the final tournament. The 27 teams were divided into 9 groups, each featuring 3 teams. The teams played against each other on a home-and-away basis with the group winners qualifying. One runner-up was randomly drawn for the CAF/AFC-UEFA play-off. East Germany, Iceland and the Soviet Union took part for the first time. Albania were the only UEFA member not to enter.

== Summary ==
Winner of each group qualified directly for the 1958 FIFA World Cup
Team was drawn randomly to play in the AFC/CAF–UEFA play-off
Other teams were eliminated

Group 1	Group 2	Group 3	Group 4	Group 5	Group 6	Group 7	Group 8	Group 9
England	France	Hungary	Czechoslovakia	Austria	Soviet Union	Yugoslavia	Northern Ireland	Scotland
Republic of Ireland	Belgium	Bulgaria	Wales	Netherlands	Poland	Romania	Italy	Spain
Denmark	Iceland	Norway	East Germany	Luxembourg	Finland	Greece	Portugal	Switzerland

== Groups ==
=== Group 1 ===
Pos	Team	Pld	W	D	L	GF	GA	GR	Pts	Qualification	England national football team	Republic of Ireland national football team	Denmark national football team
1	England	4	3	1	0	15	5	3.000	7	Qualification to 1958 FIFA World Cup	—	5–1	5–2
2	Republic of Ireland	4	2	1	1	6	7	0.857	5		1–1	—	2–1
3	Denmark	4	0	0	4	4	13	0.308	0		1–4	0–2	—

Source: FIFA

=== Group 2 ===
Pos	Team	Pld	W	D	L	GF	GA	GR	Pts	Qualification	France national football team	Belgium national football team	Iceland national football team
1	France	4	3	1	0	19	4	4.750	7	Qualification to 1958 FIFA World Cup	—	6–3	8–0
2	Belgium	4	2	1	1	16	11	1.455	5		0–0	—	8–3
3	Iceland	4	0	0	4	6	26	0.231	0		1–5	2–5	—

Source: FIFA

=== Group 3 ===
Pos	Team	Pld	W	D	L	GF	GA	GR	Pts	Qualification	Hungary national football team	Bulgaria national football team	Norway national football team
1	Hungary	4	3	0	1	12	4	3.000	6	Qualification to 1958 FIFA World Cup	—	4–1	5–0
2	Bulgaria	4	2	0	2	11	7	1.571	4		1–2	—	7–0
3	Norway	4	1	0	3	3	15	0.200	2		2–1	1–2	—

Source: FIFA

=== Group 4 ===
Pos	Team	Pld	W	D	L	GF	GA	GR	Pts	Qualification	Czechoslovakia national football team	Wales national football team	East Germany national football team
1	Czechoslovakia	4	3	0	1	9	3	3.000	6	Qualification to 1958 FIFA World Cup	—	2–0	3–1
2	Wales	4	2	0	2	6	5	1.200	4	Drawn for CAF/AFC–UEFA play-off	1–0	—	4–1
3	East Germany	4	1	0	3	5	12	0.417	2		1–4	2–1	—

Source: FIFA

=== Group 5 ===
Pos	Team	Pld	W	D	L	GF	GA	GR	Pts	Qualification	Austria national football team	Netherlands national football team	Luxembourg national football team
1	Austria	4	3	1	0	14	3	4.667	7	Qualification to 1958 FIFA World Cup	—	3–2	7–0
2	Netherlands	4	2	1	1	12	7	1.714	5		1–1	—	4–1
3	Luxembourg	4	0	0	4	3	19	0.158	0		0–3	2–5	—

Source: FIFA

=== Group 6 ===
Pos	Team	Pld	W	D	L	GF	GA	GR	Pts	Qualification	Soviet Union national football team	Poland national football team	Finland national football team
1	Soviet Union	4	3	0	1	16	3	5.333	6 (Note: As the Soviet Union and Poland finished level on points, a play-off on neutral ground was played to determine the group winner. The Soviet Union won the play-off 2–0 to win the group.)	Qualification to 1958 FIFA World Cup	—	3–0	2–1
2	Poland	4	3	0	1	9	5	1.800	6		2–1	—	4–0
3	Finland	4	0	0	4	2	19	0.105	0		0–10	1–3	—

Source: FIFA

=== Group 7 ===
Pos	Team	Pld	W	D	L	GF	GA	GR	Pts	Qualification	Yugoslavia national football team	Romania national football team	Greece national football team
1	Yugoslavia	4	2	2	0	7	2	3.500	6	Qualification to 1958 FIFA World Cup	—	2–0	4–1
2	Romania	4	2	1	1	6	4	1.500	5		1–1	—	3–0
3	Greece	4	0	1	3	2	9	0.222	1		0–0	1–2	—

Source: FIFA

=== Group 8 ===
Pos	Team	Pld	W	D	L	GF	GA	GR	Pts	Qualification	Northern Ireland national football team	Italy national football team	Portugal national football team
1	Northern Ireland	4	2	1	1	6	3	2.000	5	Qualification to 1958 FIFA World Cup	—	2–1	3–0
2	Italy	4	2	0	2	5	5	1.000	4		1–0	—	3–0
3	Portugal	4	1	1	2	4	7	0.571	3		1–1	3–0	—

Source: FIFA

=== Group 9 ===
Pos	Team	Pld	W	D	L	GF	GA	GR	Pts	Qualification	Scotland national football team	Spain national football team	Switzerland national football team
1	Scotland	4	3	0	1	10	9	1.111	6	Qualification to 1958 FIFA World Cup	—	4–2	3–2
2	Spain	4	2	1	1	12	8	1.500	5		4–1	—	2–2
3	Switzerland	4	0	1	3	6	11	0.545	1		1–2	1–4	—

Source: FIFA

== Inter-confederation play-off ==
Pos	Team	Pld	W	D	L	GF	GA	GD	Pts	Qualification	(Wales)	(Israel)
1	Wales	2	2	0	0	4	0	+4	4	1958 FIFA World Cup	—	2–0
2	Israel	2	0	0	2	0	4	−4	0		0–2	—

Source: FIFA

== Qualified Teams ==
The following 12 countries qualified for the 1958 FIFA World Cup

Team	Qualified as	Qualified on	Previous appearances in FIFA World Cup^{1}
Sweden	Hosts	23 June 1950	3 (1934, 1938, 1950)
West Germany	Defending champions	4 July 1954	3 (1934^{2}, 1938^{2}, **1954**)
England	Group 1 winners	19 May 1957	2 (1950, 1954)
France	Group 2 winners	27 October 1957	4 (1930, 1934, 1938, 1954)
Hungary	Group 3 winners	10 November 1957	3 (1934, 1938, 1954)
Czechoslovakia	Group 4 winners	27 October 1957	3 (1934, 1938, 1954)
Austria	Group 5 winners	29 September 1957	2 (1934, 1954)
Soviet Union	Group 6 winners	24 November 1957	0 (debut)
Yugoslavia	Group 7 winners	17 November 1957	3 (1930, 1950, 1954)
Northern Ireland	Group 8 winners	15 January 1958	0 (debut)
Scotland	Group 9 winners	24 November 1957	1 (1954)
Wales	AFC/CAF-UEFA play-off winners	5 February 1958	0 (debut)

^{1} Bold indicates champions for that year. Italic indicates hosts for that year.
^{2}Competed as Germany

== Goalscorers ==
8 goals

- (England) Tommy Taylor

7 goals

- (France) Thadée Cisowski

5 goals

- (Scotland) Jackie Mudie

4 goals

- (Belgium) Paul Vandenberg
- (Czechoslovakia) Tadeusz Kraus
- (England) John Atyeo
- (Hungary) Ferenc Machos
- (Poland) Edward Jankowski
- (Soviet Union) Nikita Simonyan
- (Spain) Ladislao Kubala

3 goals

- (Austria) Gerhard Hanappi
- (Belgium) Maurice Willems
- (Bulgaria) Hristo Iliev
- (France) Jean Vincent
- (Republic of Ireland) Dermot Curtis
- (Netherlands) Abe Lenstra
- (Netherlands) Noud van Melis
- (Soviet Union) Anatoli Ilyin
- (Soviet Union) Eduard Streltsov
- (Wales) Des Palmer
- (Socialist Federal Republic of Yugoslavia) Muhamed Mujić

2 goals

- (Austria) Hans Buzek
- (Austria) Theodor Wagner
- (Belgium) Henri Coppens
- (Belgium) Victor Mees
- (Belgium) Richard Orlans
- (Bulgaria) Georgi Dimitrov
- (Bulgaria) Panayot Panayotov
- (Denmark) Ove Bech Nielsen
- (East Germany) Günther Wirth
- (England) Duncan Edwards
- (France) Célestin Oliver
- (France) Roger Piantoni
- (France) Joseph Ujlaki
- (Hungary) Lajos Csordás
- (Hungary) Nándor Hidegkuti
- (Iceland) Ríkharður Jónsson
- (Iceland) Þórður Jónsson
- (Iceland) Þórður Þórðarson
- (Italy) Guido Gratton
- (Netherlands) Cor van der Gijp
- (Northern Ireland) Jimmy McIlroy
- (Norway) Harald Hennum
- (Poland) Lucjan Brychczy
- (Poland) Gerard Cieślik
- (Portugal) Manuel Vasques
- (Romania) Alexandru Ene
- (Soviet Union) Anatoli Isayev
- (Soviet Union) Igor Netto
- (Spain) Estanislao Basora
- (Spain) Alfredo di Stéfano
- (Spain) Luis Suárez Miramontes
- (Switzerland) Josef Hügi
- (Switzerland) Roger Vonlanthen
- (Wales) Ivor Allchurch
- (Wales) Cliff Jones
- (Socialist Federal Republic of Yugoslavia) Miloš Milutinović

1 goal

- (Austria) Robert Dienst
- (Austria) Walter Haummer
- (Austria) Karl Koller
- (Austria) Ernst Kozlicek
- (Austria) Helmut Senekowitsch
- (Austria) Karl Stotz
- (Austria) Otto Walzhofer
- (Belgium) André van Herpe
- (Belgium) Denis Houf
- (Belgium) André Piters
- (Bulgaria) Spiro Debarski
- (Bulgaria) Todor Diev
- (Bulgaria) Ivan Petkov Kolev
- (Bulgaria) Krum Yanev
- (Czechoslovakia) Vlastimil Bubník
- (Czechoslovakia) Pavol Molnár
- (Czechoslovakia) Anton Moravčík
- (Czechoslovakia) Ladislav Novák
- (Denmark) Aage Rou Jensen
- (Denmark) John Jensen
- (East Germany) Manfred Kaiser
- (East Germany) Helmut Müller
- (East Germany) Willy Tröger
- (England) Johnny Haynes
- (Finland) Olavi Lahtinen
- (Finland) Mauri Vanhanen
- (France) Said Brahimi
- (France) René Dereuddre
- (France) Maryan Wisnieski
- (Greece) Kostas Nestoridis
- (Greece) Vaggelis Panakis
- (Hungary) József Bozsik
- (Hungary) Károly Sándor
- (Hungary) Lajos Tichy
- (Republic of Ireland) George Cummins
- (Republic of Ireland) Johnny Gavin
- (Republic of Ireland) Alf Ringstead
- (Italy) Sergio Cervato
- (Italy) Dino da Costa
- (Italy) Gino Pivatelli
- (Luxembourg) Jean-Pierre Fiedler
- (Luxembourg) Johnny Halsdorf
- (Luxembourg) Léon Letsch
- (Netherlands) Toon Brusselers
- (Netherlands) Coen Dillen
- (Netherlands) Kees Rijvers
- (Netherlands) Servaas Wilkes
- (Northern Ireland) Billy Bingham
- (Northern Ireland) Tommy Casey
- (Northern Ireland) Wilbur Cush
- (Northern Ireland) Billy Simpson
- (Norway) Kjell Kristiansen
- (Poland) Ginter Gawlik
- (Portugal) Matateu
- (Portugal) António Dias Teixeira
- (Romania) Cornel Cacoveanu
- (Romania) Titus Ozon
- (Romania) Iosif Petschovsky
- (Romania) Nicolae Tătaru
- (Scotland) John Hewie
- (Scotland) Tommy Ring
- (Scotland) Archie Robertson
- (Scotland) Alex Scott
- (Scotland) Gordon Smith
- (Soviet Union) Genrich Fedosov
- (Soviet Union) Valentin Kozmich Ivanov
- (Soviet Union) Boris Tatushin
- (Soviet Union) Yuri Voinov
- (Spain) Miguel González
- (Spain) Enrique Mateos
- (Switzerland) Robert Ballaman
- (Switzerland) Ferdinando Riva
- (Wales) Dave Bowen
- (Wales) Mel Charles
- (Wales) Roy Vernon
- (Socialist Federal Republic of Yugoslavia) Dobrosav Krstić
- (Socialist Federal Republic of Yugoslavia) Aleksandar Petaković

1 own goal

- (Norway) Edgar Falch (playing against Hungary)
- (Wales) Ray Daniel (playing against Czechoslovakia)

== See also ==
- 1958 FIFA World Cup qualification
