= 1958 FIFA World Cup qualification =

1958 FIFA World Cup Qualification
Tournament details
- Dates: 30 September 1956 – 5 February 1958
- Teams: 55 (from 6 confederations)

Tournament statistics
- Matches played: 89
- Goals scored: 341 (3.83 per match)
- Top scorer: (England) Tommy Taylor (8 goals)

A total of 55 teams entered the 1958 FIFA World Cup qualification rounds, competing for a total of 16 spots in the final tournament. Sweden as the hosts and West Germany, as the defending champions, qualified automatically, leaving 14 spots open for competition.

== Qualification process ==
The qualification rounds for the four previous World Cups differed widely, with controversial rules and many withdrawals. From this tournament onwards, FIFA divided the teams into several continental zones, assigned a pre-determined number of places in the final tournament to each zone, and delegated the organisation of the qualifying tournaments to its confederations: UEFA of Europe, CONMEBOL of South America, NAFC of North America, CCCF of Central America and Caribbean, CAF of Africa and AFC of Asia (and OFC of Oceania after it was formed later).

The 16 spots available in the 1958 World Cup would be distributed among the continental zones as follows:

- Europe (UEFA): 11 places, 2 of them went to automatic qualifiers Sweden and West Germany, while the other 9 places were contested by 27 teams.
- South America (CONMEBOL): 3 places, contested by 9 teams.
- North, Central America and Caribbean (NAFC/CCCF): 1 place, contested by 6 teams.
- Africa (CAF) and Asia (AFC): 1 place, contested by 11 teams (including Israel, Cyprus and Turkey).

However, FIFA also imposed a rule that no team would qualify without playing at least one match because many teams qualified for previous World Cups without playing due to withdrawals of their opponents. Because Israel won the African and Asian zone under this circumstance, FIFA required them to enter a play-off against a team from Europe who initially did not qualify, with the winner of this play-off qualifying. Therefore, effectively in the end, a total of 11.5 places were granted to Europe while only 0.5 places were granted to Africa and Asia.

A total of 46 teams played at least one qualifying match. A total of 89 qualifying matches were played, and 341 goals were scored (an average of 3.83 per match).

Listed below are the dates and results of the qualification rounds.

== Confederation qualification ==
=== AFC and CAF ===
Group 1

Pos	Team	Pld	Pts
1	Indonesia	2	2
2	China	2	2
3	Taiwan	0	0

Group 2

Pos	Team	Pld	Pts
1	Israel	0	0
2	Turkey	0	0

Group 3

Pos	Team	Pld	Pts
1	Egypt	0	0
2	Cyprus	0	0

Group 4

Pos	Team	Pld	Pts
1	Sudan	2	3
2	Syria	2	1

Second round

Pos	Team	Pld	Pts
1	Israel	0	0
2	Sudan	0	0
3	Egypt	0	0
4	Indonesia	0	0

Third round

Pos	Team	Pld	Pts
1	Israel	0	0
2	Sudan	0	0

=== CCCF and NAFC ===
The 6 teams were divided into 2 groups with 3 teams each (Group 1 with teams from North America and Group 2 with teams from Central America and Caribbean). The teams played each other on a home-and-away basis. The group winners advanced to the Final Round. The two teams played against each other on a home-and-away basis with the winner qualifying for the final tournament.

Group 1

Pos	Team	Pld	Pts
1	Mexico	4	8
2	Canada	4	4
3	United States	4	0

Source: FIFA
Group 2

Pos	Team	Pld	Pts
1	Costa Rica	4	8
2	Curaçao	3	2
3	Guatemala	3	0

Source: FIFA

Final Round

Pos	Team	Pld	Pts
1	Mexico	2	3
2	Costa Rica	2	1

Source: FIFA

=== CONMEBOL ===
The 9 teams were divided into 3 groups of 3 teams each. The teams played against each other on a home-and-away basis. The group winners would qualify.

Group 1

Pos	Team	Pld	Pts
1	Brazil	2	3
2	Peru	2	1
3	Venezuela	0	0

Source: FIFA
Group 2

Pos	Team	Pld	Pts
1	Argentina	4	6
2	Bolivia	4	4
3	Chile	4	2

Source: FIFA
Group 3

Pos	Team	Pld	Pts
1	Paraguay	4	6
2	Uruguay	4	5
3	Colombia	4	1

=== UEFA ===
The 27 teams were divided into 9 groups, each featuring 3 teams. The teams played against each other on a home-and-away basis. The group winners would qualify. Denmark, East Germany, Iceland and the Soviet Union made their debuts in World Cup qualification.

Group 1
Group 2
Group 3

Pos	Team	Pld	Pts
1	England	4	7
2	Republic of Ireland	4	5
3	Denmark	4	0

Source: FIFA

Pos	Team	Pld	Pts
1	France	4	7
2	Belgium	4	5
3	Iceland	4	0

Source: FIFA

Pos	Team	Pld	Pts
1	Hungary	4	6
2	Bulgaria	4	4
3	Norway	4	2

Source: FIFA
Group 4
Group 5
Group 6

Pos	Team	Pld	Pts
1	Czechoslovakia	4	6
2	Wales	4	4
3	East Germany	4	2

Source: FIFA

Pos	Team	Pld	Pts
1	Austria	4	7
2	Netherlands	4	5
3	Luxembourg	4	0

Source: FIFA

Pos	Team	Pld	Pts
1	Soviet Union	4	6
2	Poland	4	6
3	Finland	4	0

Source: FIFA
Group 7
Group 8
Group 9

Pos	Team	Pld	Pts
1	Yugoslavia	4	6
2	Romania	4	5
3	Greece	4	1

Source: FIFA

Pos	Team	Pld	Pts
1	Northern Ireland	4	5
2	Italy	4	4
3	Portugal	4	3

Source: FIFA

Pos	Team	Pld	Pts
1	Scotland	4	6
2	Spain	4	5
3	Switzerland	4	1

Source: FIFA

== Inter-confederation play-offs: AFC/CAF v UEFA ==
A special play-off was created between Israel and the runner-up of one of the UEFA/CONMEBOL/CCCF/NAFC Groups, where the teams played against each other on a home-and-away basis, with the winner qualifying. Two-time champions Uruguay withdrew, while Northern Ireland and Italy had one final match yet to play, so all three were left out. Belgium, Bulgaria, Wales, Netherlands, Poland, Romania, Spain, Peru, Bolivia and Costa Rica were left to draw. After Belgium refused, Wales, the runner-up of UEFA Group 4, was the team drawn from the UEFA group runners-up.

Pos	Team	Pld	W	D	L	GF	GA	GD	Pts	Qualification	(Wales)	(Israel)
1	Wales	2	2	0	0	4	0	+4	4	1958 FIFA World Cup	—	2–0
2	Israel	2	0	0	2	0	4	−4	0		0–2	—

Source: FIFA

== Qualified teams ==
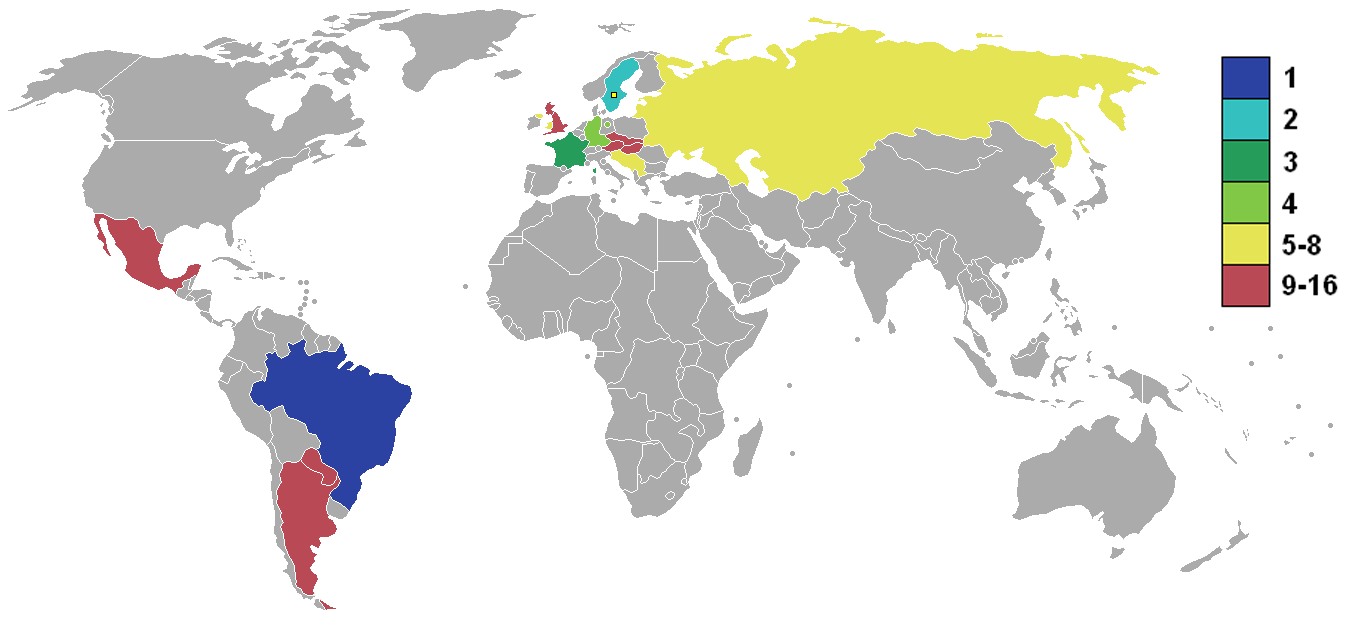
Qualifying countries

Team	Date of qualification	Finals appearance	Streak	Last appearance
Argentina	27 October 1957	3rd	1	1934
Austria	29 September 1957	3rd	2	1954
Brazil	21 April 1957	6th	6	1954
Czechoslovakia	27 October 1957	4th	2	1954
England	19 May 1957	3rd	3	1954
France	27 October 1957	5th	2	1954
Hungary	10 November 1957	4th	2	1954
Mexico	27 October 1957	4th	3	1954
Northern Ireland	15 January 1958	1st	1	—
Paraguay	14 July 1957	3rd	1	1950
Scotland	6 November 1957	2nd	2	1954
Sweden (hosts)	23 June 1950	4th	1	1950
Soviet Union	24 November 1957	1st	1	—
Wales	5 February 1958	1st	1	—
West Germany (defending champions)	4 July 1954	4th	2	1954
Yugoslavia	17 November 1957	4th	3	1954

== Goalscorers ==
8 goals

- (England) Tommy Taylor

7 goals

- (France) Thadée Cisowski

5 goals

- (Mexico) Crescencio Gutiérrez
- (Scotland) Jackie Mudie

4 goals

- (Belgium) Paul Vandenberg
- (Czechoslovakia) Tadeusz Kraus
- (England) John Atyeo
- (Hungary) Ferenc Machos
- (Indonesia) Rusli Ramang
- (Poland) Edward Jankowski
- (Soviet Union) Nikita Simonyan
- (Spain) Ladislao Kubala

3 goals

- (Argentina) Omar Oreste Corbatta
- (Argentina) Norberto Menéndez
- (Austria) Gerhard Hanappi
- (Belgium) Maurice Willems
- (Bolivia) Máximo Alcócer
- (Bulgaria) Hristo Iliev
- (Costa Rica) Jorge Hernán Monge
- (Costa Rica) Rodolfo Herrera González
- (Costa Rica) Álvaro Murillo
- (France) Jean Vincent
- (Republic of Ireland) Dermot Curtis
- (Mexico) Alfredo Hernández
- (Mexico) Héctor Hernández
- (Mexico) Salvador Reyes Monteón
- (Netherlands) Abe Lenstra
- (Netherlands) Noud van Melis
- (Paraguay) Juan Bautista Agüero
- (Paraguay) Florencio Amarilla
- (Soviet Union) Anatoli Ilyin
- (Soviet Union) Eduard Streltsov
- (Wales) Des Palmer
- (Socialist Federal Republic of Yugoslavia) Muhamed Mujić

2 goals

- (Argentina) Roberto Zárate
- (Austria) Hans Buzek
- (Austria) Theodor Wagner
- (Belgium) Henri Coppens
- (Belgium) Victor Mees
- (Belgium) Richard Orlans
- (Bulgaria) Georgi Dimitrov
- (Bulgaria) Panayot Panayotov
- (Canada) Art Hughes
- (Canada) Brian Philley
- (Canada) Gogie Stewart
- (Costa Rica) Mario Cordero
- (Costa Rica) Rubén Jiménez Rodríguez
- (Costa Rica) Danilo Montero Campos
- (Colony of Curaçao and Dependencies) Wilfred de Lanoy
- (Denmark) Ove Bech Nielsen
- (East Germany) Günther Wirth
- (England) Duncan Edwards
- (France) Célestin Oliver
- (France) Roger Piantoni
- (France) Joseph Ujlaki
- (Guatemala) Francisco López Contreras
- (Hungary) Lajos Csordás
- (Hungary) Nándor Hidegkuti
- (Iceland) Ríkharður Jónsson
- (Iceland) Þórður Jónsson
- (Iceland) Þórður Þórðarson
- (Italy) Guido Gratton
- (Mexico) Carlos González
- (Mexico) Ligorio López
- (Mexico) Enrique Sesma
- (Netherlands) Cor van der Gijp
- (Northern Ireland) Jimmy McIlroy
- (Norway) Harald Hennum
- (Paraguay) Ángel Jara Saguier
- (Paraguay) Enrique Jara Saguier
- (Poland) Lucjan Brychczy
- (Poland) Gerard Cieślik
- (Portugal) Manuel Vasques
- (Romania) Alexandru Ene
- (Soviet Union) Anatoli Isayev
- (Soviet Union) Igor Netto
- (Spain) Estanislao Basora
- (Spain) Alfredo di Stéfano
- (Spain) Luis Suárez Miramontes
- (Switzerland) Josef Hügi
- (Switzerland) Roger Vonlanthen
- (United States) Ed Murphy
- (Wales) Ivor Allchurch
- (Wales) Cliff Jones
- (Socialist Federal Republic of Yugoslavia) Miloš Milutinović

1 goal

- (Argentina) Norberto Conde
- (Argentina) Eliseo Prado
- (Austria) Robert Dienst
- (Austria) Walter Haummer
- (Austria) Karl Koller
- (Austria) Ernst Kozlicek
- (Austria) Helmut Senekowitsch
- (Austria) Karl Stotz
- (Austria) Otto Walzhofer
- (Belgium) André Van Herpe
- (Belgium) Denis Houf
- (Belgium) André Piters
- (Bolivia) Ricardo Alcón
- (Bolivia) Ausberto García
- (Bolivia) Máximo Ramírez
- (Brazil) Didi
- (Brazil) Índio
- (Bulgaria) Spiro Debarski
- (Bulgaria) Todor Diev
- (Bulgaria) Ivan Petkov Kolev
- (Bulgaria) Krum Yanev
- (Canada) Norm McLeod
- (Canada) Ostap Steckiw
- (Chile) Guillermo Díaz
- (Chile) Jaime Ramírez
- (China) Nian Weisi
- (China) Sun Fucheng
- (China) Wang Lu
- (China) Zhang Honggen
- (Colombia) Carlos Arango
- (Colombia) Ricardo Díaz
- (Colombia) Jaime Gutiérrez
- (Costa Rica) Juan Soto Quiros
- (Colony of Curaçao and Dependencies) Edgard Meulens
- (Colony of Curaçao and Dependencies) Hubert Sambo
- (Czechoslovakia) Vlastimil Bubník
- (Czechoslovakia) Pavol Molnár
- (Czechoslovakia) Anton Moravčík
- (Czechoslovakia) Ladislav Novák
- (Denmark) Aage Rou Jensen
- (Denmark) John Jensen
- (East Germany) Manfred Kaiser
- (East Germany) Helmut Müller
- (East Germany) Willy Tröger
- (England) Johnny Haynes
- (Finland) Olavi Lahtinen
- (Finland) Mauri Vanhanen
- (France) Said Brahimi
- (France) René Dereuddre
- (France) Maryan Wisnieski
- (Greece) Kostas Nestoridis
- (Greece) Vaggelis Panakis
- (Guatemala) Augusto Espinoza
- (Guatemala) Jorge Vickers
- (Hungary) József Bozsik
- (Hungary) Károly Sándor
- (Hungary) Lajos Tichy
- (Indonesia) Eddang Witarsa
- (Republic of Ireland) George Cummins
- (Republic of Ireland) Johnny Gavin
- (Republic of Ireland) Alf Ringstead
- (Italy) Sergio Cervato
- (Italy) Dino da Costa
- (Italy) Gino Pivatelli
- (Luxembourg) Jean-Pierre Fiedler
- (Luxembourg) Johnny Halsdorf
- (Luxembourg) Léon Letsch
- (Mexico) Jaime Belmonte
- (Netherlands) Toon Brusselers
- (Netherlands) Coen Dillen
- (Netherlands) Kees Rijvers
- (Netherlands) Servaas Wilkes
- (Northern Ireland) Billy Bingham
- (Northern Ireland) Tommy Casey
- (Northern Ireland) Wilbur Cush
- (Northern Ireland) Billy Simpson
- (Norway) Kjell Kristiansen
- (Paraguay) Óscar Aguilera
- (Peru) Alberto Terry
- (Poland) Ginter Gawlik
- (Portugal) Matateu
- (Portugal) António Dias Teixeira
- (Romania) Cornel Cacoveanu
- (Romania) Titus Ozon
- (Romania) Iosif Petschovsky
- (Romania) Nicolae Tătaru
- (Scotland) John Hewie
- (Scotland) Tommy Ring
- (Scotland) Archie Robertson
- (Scotland) Alex Scott
- (Scotland) Gordon Smith
- (Soviet Union) Genrich Fedosov
- (Soviet Union) Valentin Kozmich Ivanov
- (Soviet Union) Boris Tatushin
- (Soviet Union) Yuri Voinov
- (Spain) Miguel González
- (Spain) Enrique Mateos
- (Sudan) Suleiman Faris
- (Sudan) Siddiq Manzul
- (Switzerland) Robert Ballaman
- (Switzerland) Ferdinando Riva
- (Syria) Jabra Al-Zarqa
- (United States) Harry Keough
- (United States) Ruben Mendoza
- (United States) James Murphy
- (Uruguay) Javier Ambrois
- (Uruguay) Eladio Benítez
- (Uruguay) William Martínez
- (Uruguay) Óscar Míguez
- (Wales) Dave Bowen
- (Wales) Mel Charles
- (Wales) Roy Vernon
- (Socialist Federal Republic of Yugoslavia) Dobrosav Krstić
- (Socialist Federal Republic of Yugoslavia) Aleksandar Petaković

1 own goal

- (Norway) Edgar Falch (playing against Hungary)
- (Wales) Ray Daniel (playing against Czechoslovakia)

== Notes ==
- Wales is the only team to ever qualify after having been eliminated and then reinstated. Their qualification meant that all four Home Nations qualified (the only time in history), and that no team from the separate African and Asian zone qualified. This remained Wales' only appearance in the finals until 2022, when they qualified through the European zone for the first time.
- Two-time former champions Uruguay, who in their three previous appearances had always benefited from direct qualifications or withdrawals, now failed in what was the first time they actually had to play qualifying games.
- Italy were eliminated in qualifying for the first time.
