= 1958 FIFA World Cup qualification (CCCF and NAFC) =

Sports tournament

Tournament details
- Dates: 10 February – 27 October 1957
- Teams: 6

Tournament statistics
- Matches played: 13
- Goals scored: 58 (4.46 per match)
- Top scorer: (Mexico) Crescencio Gutiérrez (5 goals)

The 1958 FIFA World Cup qualification for North, Central America and the Caribbean serves as the preliminary tournament for the region. Six teams entered the tournament to compete for one place in the final tournament.

== Format ==
There were two rounds of play:

- First Round: The 6 teams were divided into 2 groups with 3 teams each (Group 1 with teams from North America and Group 2 with teams from Central America and Caribbean). The teams played against each other on a home-and-away basis. The group winners advanced to the Final Round.
- Final Round: The 2 teams played against each other on a home-and-away basis. The winner qualified.

== First round ==
=== Group 1 ===
Pos	Team	Pld	W	D	L	GF	GA	GR	Pts	Qualification	Mexico national football team	Canada men's national soccer team	United States men's national soccer team
1	Mexico	4	4	0	0	18	2	9.000	8	Qualification to Final Round	—	3–0	6–0
2	Canada	4	2	0	2	8	8	1.000	4		0–2	—	5–1
3	United States	4	0	0	4	5	21	0.238	0		2–7	2–3	—

Source: FIFA
7 April 1957

Mexico	6–0	United States
C. Gutiérrez 14', 26'; Reyes 33', 69', 76'; H. Hernández 63'	Report

Estadio Ciudad de los Deportes, Mexico City, Mexico
Attendance: 60,000
Referee: Van Rosberg (Netherlands Antilles)

28 April 1957

United States	2–7	Mexico
E. Murphy 5', 45'	Report	A. Hernández 22', 36', 82'; C. Gutiérrez 38'; H. Hernández 65', 87'; Sesma 79'

Memorial Stadium, Long Beach, United States
Attendance: 12,500
Referee: Morgan (Canada)

22 June 1957

Canada	5–1	United States
McLeod 32'; Philley 35'; Hughes 55', 80'; Stewart 57'	Report	Keough 25' (pen.)

Varsity Stadium Toronto, Canada
Attendance: 7,567
Referee: Sadler (Canada)

30 June 1957

Mexico	3–0	Canada
C. González 5', 72'; C. Gutiérrez 46'	Report

Estadio Ciudad de los Deportes, Mexico City, Mexico
Attendance: 60,000
Referee: Van Rosberg (Netherlands Antilles)

3 July 1957

Canada	0–2	Mexico
	Report	C. Gutiérrez 8'; Sesma 28'

Estadio Ciudad de los Deportes, Mexico City, Mexico
Attendance: 35,000
Referee: Van Rosberg (Netherlands Antilles)

6 July 1957

United States	2–3	Canada
Mendoza 42'; J. Murphy 80'	Report	Philley 9'; Steckiw 14'; Stewart 25'

Public School Grounds, St. Louis, United States
Attendance: 1,500
Referee: Lutostanski (United States)

=== Group 2 ===
Pos	Team	Pld	W	D	L	GF	GA	GR	Pts	Qualification	Costa Rica national football team	Netherlands Antilles national football team	Guatemala national football team
1	Costa Rica	4	4	0	0	15	4	3.750	8	Qualification to Final Round	—	4–0	3–1
2	Curaçao	3	1	0	2	4	7	0.571	2		1–2	—	NP
3	Guatemala	3	0	0	3	4	12	0.333	0		2–6	1–3	—

Source: FIFA
10 February 1957

Guatemala	2–6	Costa Rica
Vickers 19'; Espinoza 87'	Report	Hernán 11', 28', 38'; Jiménez 17'; Montero 48'; Murillo 78'

Estadio Mateo Flores, Guatemala City, Guatemala
Referee: Sundheim (Colombia)

17 February 1957

Costa Rica	3–1 (66')	Guatemala
Jiménez 12'; Cordero 28'; Herrera 65'	Report	López 61'

Estadio Nacional de la Sabana, San José, Costa Rica
Referee: Orrego (Colombia)

3 March 1957

Costa Rica	4–0	Curaçao
Herrera 16', 63'; Murillo 35', 67'	Report

Estadio Nacional de la Sabana, San José, Costa Rica
Referee: McKenna (England)

14 March 1957

Guatemala	1–3	Curaçao
López 51'	Report	De Lanoy 23', 31'; Meulens 65'

Estadio Mateo Flores, Guatemala City, Guatemala
Referee: Sundheim (Colombia)

4 August 1957

Curaçao	1–2	Costa Rica
Sambo 21'	Report	Cordero 53'; Montero 60'

Rif Stadion, Willemstad, Territory of Curaçao
Referee: Orlandini (Italy)

Curaçao	Not played	Guatemala

== Final round ==
Pos	Team	Pld	W	D	L	GF	GA	GR	Pts	Qualification	(Mexico)	(Costa Rica)
1	Mexico	2	1	1	0	3	1	3.000	3	Qualification to 1958 FIFA World Cup	—	2–0
2	Costa Rica	2	0	1	1	1	3	0.333	1		1–1	—

Source: FIFA
20 October 1957

Mexico	2–0	Costa Rica
Belmonte 77'; López 86'	Report

Estadio Ciudad de los Deportes, Mexico City, Mexico
Attendance: 80,000
Referee: Husband (England)

27 October 1957

Costa Rica	1–1	Mexico
Soto 32'	Report	López 27'

Estadio Nacional, San José, Costa Rica
Attendance: 35,738
Referee: Husband (England)

== Qualified teams ==
Team	Qualified as	Qualified on	Previous appearances in FIFA World Cup^{1}
Mexico	Final Round winners	27 October 1957	3 (1930, 1950, 1954)

^{1} Bold indicates champions for that year. Italic indicates hosts for that year.

== Goalscorers ==
There were 58 goals scored in 13 matches, for an average of 4.46 goals per match.

5 goals

- (Mexico) Crescencio Gutiérrez

3 goals

- (Mexico) Salvador Reyes Monteón
- (Mexico) Hector Hernández
- (Mexico) Alfredo Hernández
- (Costa Rica) Jorge Hernán Monge
- (Costa Rica) Álvaro Murillo
- (Costa Rica) Rodolfo Herrera González

2 goals

- (Mexico) Enrique Sesma
- (Mexico) Carlos González
- (Mexico) Ligorio López
- (Canada) Brian Philley
- (Canada) Art Hughes
- (Canada) Gogie Stewart
- (Costa Rica) Rubén Jiménez Rodríguez
- (Costa Rica) Danilo Montero Campos
- (Costa Rica) Mario Cordero
- (United States) Ed Murphy
- (Guatemala) López
- (Netherlands Antilles) Wilfred de Lanoy

1 goal

- (United States) Harry Keough
- (United States) Ruben Mendoza
- (United States) James Murphy
- (Canada) Norm McLeod
- (Canada) Ostap Steckiw
- (Guatemala) Jorge Vickers
- (Guatemala) Augusto Espinoza
- (Netherlands Antilles) Hubert Sambo
- (Netherlands Antilles) Edgard Meulens
- (Costa Rica) Juan Soto Quiros
- (Mexico) Jaime Belmonte
