= 1957–58 in Belgian football =

Football in Belgium
- Season: 1957–58

The 1957–58 season was the 55th season of competitive football in Belgium. Standard Liège won their first Division I title. R Antwerp FC entered the 1957–58 European Champion Clubs' Cup as Belgian title holder. The Belgium national football team finished their 1958 FIFA World Cup qualification campaign in the second place of Group 2, 2 points behind France, and thus did not qualify for the World Cup finals in Sweden.

== Overview ==
At the end of the season, R Daring Club de Bruxelles and KRC Mechelen were relegated to Division II and were replaced in Division I by K Beringen FC and RRC Tournaisien from Division II.
The bottom 2 clubs in Division II (ASV Oostende KM and R Uccle Sport) were relegated to Division III, to be replaced by (RFC Renaisien and RFC Sérésien) from Division III.
The bottom 2 clubs of each Division III league K Tubantia FC, RCS Boussu-Bois, RAS Herstal and R Stade Louvain were relegated to Promotion, to be replaced by KFC Waeslandia Burcht, RUS Tournaisienne, R Fléron FC and R Stade Waremmien from Promotion.

== National team ==
| Date | Venue | Opponents | Score* | Comp | Belgium scorers |
|---|---|---|---|---|---|
| September 4, 1957 | Laugardalsvöllur, Reykjavík (A) | Iceland | WCQ | F | André Van Herpe, Maurice Willems, Paul Vandenberg (3) |
| October 27, 1957 | Heysel Stadium, Brussels (H) | France | 0-0 | WCQ |
| November 17, 1957 | Feijenoord Stadion, Rotterdam (A) | The Netherlands | 2-5 | F | Paul Vandenberg, Denis Houf |
| December 8, 1957 | 19 Mayıs Stadium, Ankara (A) | Turkey | 1-1 | F | Armand Jurion |
| March 2, 1958 | Heysel Stadium, Brussels (H) | Germany | 0-2 | F |
| April 13, 1958 | Bosuilstadion, Antwerp (H) | The Netherlands | 2-7 | F | Henri Coppens (2) |
| May 26, 1958 | Hardturm, Zürich (A) | Switzerland | 2-0 | F | Jacques Stockman, Marcel Paeschen |

* Belgium score given first

Key

- H = Home match
- A = Away match
- N = On neutral ground
- F = Friendly
- WCQ = World Cup qualification
- o.g. = own goal

== European competitions ==
R Antwerp FC lost in the first round of the 1957–58 European Champion Clubs' Cup to title holder Real Madrid of Spain (defeat 1-2 at home and defeat 6-0 away).

== Honours ==
| Competition | Winner |
|---|---|
| Division I | Standard Liège |
| Division II | K Beringen FC |
| Division III | RFC Renaisien and RFC Sérésien |
| Promotion | KFC Waeslandia Burcht, RUS Tournaisienne, R Fléron FC and R Stade Waremmien |

== Final league tables ==
=== Premier Division ===
- 1957-58 Top scorer: Jef Van Gool (R Antwerp FC) and Jef Vliers (R Beerschot AC) with 25 goals.
- 1957 Golden Shoe: Armand Jurion (RSC Anderlechtois)
