= 1958 FIFA World Cup qualification (AFC and CAF) =

1958 FIFA World Cup qualification in Asia and Africa

Tournament details
- Dates: 8 March 1957 – 5 February 1958
- Teams: 6 (from 1 confederation)

Tournament statistics
- Matches played: 5
- Goals scored: 12 (2.4 per match)
- Top scorer: (Indonesia) Rusli Ramang (4 goals)

The 1958 FIFA World Cup qualification for Asia and Africa served as the preliminary tournament for the region. The winner of the tournament went on to face a European team in an Inter-confederation play-off. For an overview of the qualification rounds, see the article 1958 FIFA World Cup qualification.

FIFA rejected the entries of Ethiopia and South Korea, whereas Chinese Taipei withdrew. The remaining 8 teams played in a knockout tournament, with matches on a home-and-away basis. The tournament winner would qualify. As all their opening teams declined to play them, Israel won the tournament and advanced to the qualification play-off against Wales.

== Format ==
There were four rounds:

- First Round: 8 teams were divided into 4 groups of 2 teams to determine four winners.
- Second Round: The 4 first round winners played in one group with 2 advancing to the third round.
- Third Round: The remaining two teams contested one spot in the CAF/AFC–UEFA play-off.

== Result ==
=== First round ===
==== Group 1 ====
| Pos | Team | Pld | W | D | L | GF | GA | GR | Pts | Qualification | (Indonesia) | (China) | (Taiwan) |
|---|---|---|---|---|---|---|---|---|---|---|---|---|---|
| 1 | Indonesia | 2 | 1 | 0 | 1 | 5 | 4 | 1.250 | 2 | Second round with superior goal average | — | 2–0 | — |
| 2 | China | 2 | 1 | 0 | 1 | 4 | 5 | 0.800 | 2 | | 4–3 | — | — |
| 3 | Taiwan | 0 | 0 | 0 | 0 | 0 | 0 | — | 0 | Withdrew | — | — | — |

12 May 1957

| Indonesia | 2–0 | China |
|---|---|---|
| Ramang 47', 80' | Report |

Ikada Stadium, Jakarta
Referee: Jonni (Italy)

2 June 1957

| China | 4–3 | Indonesia |
|---|---|---|
| Zhang Honggen 1'; Nian Weisi 9'; Sun Fucheng 47'; Wang Lu 75' | Report | Ramang 25', 55'; Witarsa 70' |

Xiannongtan Stadium, Beijing
Referee: Chakravarti (India)
23 June 1957

| Indonesia | 0–0 (a.e.t.) | China |
|---|---|---|
| | Report |

Aung San Stadium, Rangoon (Burma)
Referee: U Ba Thaung (Burma)

==== Group 2 ====
| Pos | Team | Pld | W | D | L | GF | GA | GR | Pts | Qualification | (Israel) | (Turkey) |
|---|---|---|---|---|---|---|---|---|---|---|---|---|
| 1 | Israel | 0 | 0 | 0 | 0 | 0 | 0 | — | 0 | Second round | — | — |
| 2 | Turkey | 0 | 0 | 0 | 0 | 0 | 0 | — | 0 | Withdrew | — | — |

==== Group 3 ====
| Pos | Team | Pld | W | D | L | GF | GA | GR | Pts | Qualification | (Egypt) | (Cyprus) |
|---|---|---|---|---|---|---|---|---|---|---|---|---|
| 1 | Egypt | 0 | 0 | 0 | 0 | 0 | 0 | — | 0 | second round | — | — |
| 2 | Cyprus | 0 | 0 | 0 | 0 | 0 | 0 | — | 0 | Withdrew | — | — |

==== Group 4 ====
| Pos | Team | Pld | W | D | L | GF | GA | GR | Pts | Qualification | (Sudan) | (Syria) |
|---|---|---|---|---|---|---|---|---|---|---|---|---|
| 1 | Sudan | 2 | 1 | 1 | 0 | 2 | 1 | 2.000 | 3 | Second Round | — | 1–0 |
| 2 | Syria | 2 | 0 | 1 | 1 | 1 | 2 | 0.500 | 1 | | 1–1 | — |

8 March 1957

| Sudan | 1–0 | Syria |
|---|---|---|
| Manzul 78' (pen.) | Report |

Khartoum Stadium, Khartoum
Attendance: 12,500
Referee: Riccardo Pieri (Italy)

24 May 1957

| Syria | 1–1 | Sudan |
|---|---|---|
| Al-Zarqa 70' | Report | Faris 38' |

Abbasiyyin Stadium, Damascus
Attendance: 12,500
Referee: Konstantinos Ioannidis (Greece)

=== Second round ===
| Pos | Team | Pld | W | D | L | GF | GA | GD | Pts | Qualification | Israel national football team | Sudan national football team | Egypt national football team | Indonesia national football team |
|---|---|---|---|---|---|---|---|---|---|---|---|---|---|---|
| 1 | Israel | 0 | 0 | 0 | 0 | 0 | 0 | 0 | 0 | Third round | — | — | — | — |
| 2 | Sudan | 0 | 0 | 0 | 0 | 0 | 0 | 0 | 0 | Third round | — | — | — | — |
| 3 | Egypt | 0 | 0 | 0 | 0 | 0 | 0 | 0 | 0 | Withdrew | — | — | — | — |
| 4 | Indonesia | 0 | 0 | 0 | 0 | 0 | 0 | 0 | 0 | Withdrew | — | — | — | — |

=== Third round ===
| Pos | Team | Pld | W | D | L | GF | GA | GR | Pts | Qualification | (Israel) | (Sudan) |
|---|---|---|---|---|---|---|---|---|---|---|---|---|
| 1 | Israel | 0 | 0 | 0 | 0 | 0 | 0 | — | 0 | Inter-Confederation play-off | — | — |
| 2 | Sudan | 0 | 0 | 0 | 0 | 0 | 0 | — | 0 | Withdrew | — | — |

== Goalscorers ==
There were 12 goals scored in 4 matches, for an average of 3 goals per match.

4 goals

- (Indonesia) Rusli Ramang

1 goal

- (China) Zhang Honggen
- (China) Nian Weisi
- (China) Sun Fucheng
- (China) Wang Lu
- (Sudan) Siddiq Manzul
- (Sudan) Suleiman Faris
- (Indonesia) Endang Witarsa
- (Syria) Jabra Al-Zarqa

== Inter-confederation play-off ==
| Pos | Team | Pld | W | D | L | GF | GA | GD | Pts | Qualification | (Wales) | (Israel) |
|---|---|---|---|---|---|---|---|---|---|---|---|---|
| 1 | Wales | 2 | 2 | 0 | 0 | 4 | 0 | +4 | 4 | 1958 FIFA World Cup | — | 2–0 |
| 2 | Israel | 2 | 0 | 0 | 2 | 0 | 4 | −4 | 0 | | 0–2 | — |

Source: FIFA
