= Hungary national football team results (1950–1969) =

This article provides details of international football games played by the Hungary national football team from 1950 to 1969. The national team earned a reputation during this time period as one of the most feared national teams in history.

== Results ==
=== 1950 ===
30 April 1950 Friendly	Hungary	5–0	Czechoslovakia	Hungary

14 May 1950 Friendly	Austria	5–3	Hungary	Austria

4 June 1950 Friendly	Poland	2–5	Hungary	Poland

24 September 1950 Friendly	Hungary	12–0	Albania	Hungary

29 October 1950 Friendly	Hungary	4–3	Austria	Hungary

12 November 1950 Friendly	Bulgaria	1–1	Hungary	Bulgaria

=== 1951 ===
27 May 1951 Friendly	Hungary	6–0	Poland	Hungary

14 October 1951 Friendly	Czechoslovakia	1–2	Hungary	Czechoslovakia

18 November 1951 Friendly	Hungary	8–0	Finland	Hungary

=== 1952 ===
18 May 1952 Friendly	Hungary	5–0	East Germany	Hungary

24 May 1952 Friendly	Soviet Union	1–1	Hungary	Soviet Union

27 May 1952 Friendly	Soviet Union	2–1	Hungary	Soviet Union

15 June 1952 Friendly	Poland	1–5	Hungary	Poland

22 June 1952 Friendly	Finland	1–6	Hungary	Finland

15 July 1952 1952 Summer Olympics PR	Hungary	2–1	Romania	Kupittaa, Turku
19:00	Czibor 21'; Kocsis 73'	Report	Suru 86'	Attendance: 10,588; Referee: Nikolay Latyshev (URS)

21 July 1952 1952 Summer Olympics 1R	Hungary	3–0	Italy	Töölön Pallokenttä, Helsinki
19:00	Palotás 11', 20'; Kocsis 83'	Report		Attendance: 13,870; Referee: Karel van der Meer (NED)

24 July 1952 1952 Summer Olympics QF	Hungary	7–1	Turkey	Kotkan Urheilukeskus, Kotka
19:00	Palotás 18'; Kocsis 32', 90'; Lantos 48'; Puskás 54', 72'; Bozsik 70'	Report	Guder 57'	Attendance: 4,743; Referee: Waldemar Karni (FIN)

28 July 1952 1952 Summer Olympics SF	Hungary	6–0	Sweden	Olympic Stadium, Helsinki
19:00	Puskás 1'; Palotás 16'; Lindh 36' (o.g.); Kocsis 65', 69'; Hidegkuti 67'	Report		Attendance: 30,471; Referee: William Ling (GBR)

2 August 1952 1952 Summer Olympics F	Hungary	2–0	Yugoslavia	Olympic Stadium, Helsinki
19:00	Puskás 70'; Czibor 88'	Report		Attendance: 58,553; Referee: Arthur Ellis (GBR)

20 September 1952 Dr Gero International Cup	Switzerland	2–4	Hungary	Switzerland

19 October 1952 Friendly	Hungary	5–0	Czechoslovakia	Hungary

=== 1953 ===
26 April 1953 Friendly	Hungary	1–1	Austria	Hungary

17 May 1953 Dr Gero International Cup	Italy	0–3	Hungary	Italy

5 July 1953 Friendly	Sweden	2–4	Hungary	Sweden

4 October 1953 Friendly	Bulgaria	1–1	Hungary	Bulgaria

4 October 1953 Friendly	Czechoslovakia	1–5	Hungary	Czechoslovakia

11 October 1953 Friendly	Austria	2–3	Hungary	Austria

15 November 1953 Friendly	Hungary	2–2	Sweden	Hungary

25 November 1953 Friendly	England	3–6	Hungary	London, England
	Sewell 13'; Mortensen 38'; Ramsey 57' (pen.)	Report	Hidegkuti 1', 20', 53'; Puskás 24', 29'; Bozsik 50'	Stadium: Wembley Stadium; Attendance: 100,000; Referee: Leo Horn (Netherlands)

=== 1954 ===
12 February 1954 Friendly	Egypt	0–3	Hungary	Egypt

11 April 1954 Friendly	Austria	0–1	Hungary	Hungary

23 May 1954 Friendly	Hungary	7–1	England	Budapest, Hungary
	Lantos 10'; Puskás 17', 71'; Kocsis 19', 57'; Hidegkuti 59'; Tóth 63'		Broadis 68'	Stadium: Népstadion; Attendance: 92,000; Referee: Giorgio Bernardi (Italy)

17 June 1954 1954 World Cup GS	Hungary	9–0	South Korea	Hardturm Stadium, Zürich
18:00	Puskás 12', 89'; Lantos 18'; Kocsis 24', 36', 50'; Czibor 59'; Palotás 75', 83'	Report		Attendance: 13,000; Referee: Raymond Vincenti (France)

20 June 1954 1954 World Cup GS	Hungary	8–3	West Germany	St. Jakob Stadium, Basel
16:50	Kocsis 3', 21', 69', 78'; Puskás 17'; Hidegkuti 52', 54'; J. Tóth 75'	Report	Pfaff 25'; Rahn 77'; Herrmann 84'	Attendance: 56,000; Referee: William Ling (England)

27 June 1954 1954 World Cup QF	Hungary	4–2	Brazil	Wankdorf Stadium, Bern
17:00 CET	Hidegkuti 4'; Kocsis 7', 88'; Lantos 60' (pen.)	Report	Djalma Santos 18' (pen.); Julinho 65'	Attendance: 40,000; Referee: Arthur Ellis (England)

30 June 1954 1954 World Cup SF	Hungary	4–2 (a.e.t.)	Uruguay	Stade Olympique de la Pontaise, Lausanne
18:00 (CET)	Czibor 13'; Hidegkuti 46'; Kocsis 111', 116'	Report	Hohberg 75', 86'	Attendance: 45,000; Referee: Benjamin Griffiths (Wales)

4 July 1954 1954 World Cup F	West Germany	3–2	Hungary	Wankdorf Stadium, Bern
17:00 CET	Morlock 10'; Rahn 18', 84'	Report	Puskás 6'; Czibor 8'	Attendance: 62,500; Referee: William Ling (England)

19 September 1954 Friendly	Hungary	5–1	Romania	Hungary

26 September 1954 Friendly	Soviet Union	1–1	Hungary	Soviet Union

10 October 1954 Friendly	Hungary	5–1	Switzerland	Hungary

24 October 1954 Friendly	Hungary	4–1	Czechoslovakia	Hungary

14 November 1954 Friendly	Hungary	4–1	Austria	Hungary

8 December 1954 Friendly	Scotland	2–4	Hungary	Scotland

=== 1955 ===
24 April 1955 Dr Gero International Cup	Austria	2–2	Hungary	Austria

8 May 1955 Friendly	Norway	0–5	Hungary	Norway

11 May 1955 Friendly	Sweden	3–7	Hungary	Sweden

15 May 1955 Friendly	Denmark	0–6	Hungary	Denmark

19 May 1955 Friendly	Finland	1–9	Hungary	Finland

29 May 1955 Friendly	Hungary	3–1	Scotland	Hungary

17 September 1955 Dr Gero International Cup	Switzerland	4–5	Hungary	Switzerland

25 September 1955 Friendly	Hungary	1–1	Soviet Union	Hungary

2 October 1955 Dr Gero International Cup	Czechoslovakia	1–3	Hungary	Czechoslovakia

16 October 1955 Dr Gero International Cup	Hungary	6–1	Austria	Hungary

13 November 1955 Friendly	Hungary	4–2	Sweden	Hungary

27 November 1955 Dr Gero International Cup	Hungary	2–0	Italy	Hungary

=== 1956 ===
19 February 1956 Friendly	Turkey	3–1	Hungary	Turkey

29 February 1956 Friendly	Lebanon	1–4	Hungary	Lebanon

29 April 1956 Dr Gero International Cup	Hungary	2–2	Yugoslavia	Hungary

20 May 1956 Dr Gero International Cup	Hungary	2–4	Czechoslovakia	Hungary

3 June 1956 Friendly	Belgium	5–4	Hungary	Belgium

9 June 1956 Friendly	Portugal	2–2	Hungary	Lisbon, Portugal
18:00 (+1:00)	Águas 45'; Vasques 65'		51' Kocsis; 59' Lantos	Stadium: Estádio Nacional; Attendance: 70,000; Referee: Vicenzo Orlandini (Italy)

15 July 1956 Friendly	Hungary	4–1	Poland	Hungary

16 September 1956 Dr Gero International Cup	Yugoslavia	1–3	Hungary	Yugoslavia

23 September 1956 Friendly	Soviet Union	0–1	Hungary	Soviet Union

7 October 1956 Friendly	France	1–2	Hungary	France

14 October 1956 Friendly	Austria	0–2	Hungary	Austria

=== 1957 ===
12 June 1957 1958 World Cup qualification	Norway	2–1	Hungary	Oslo, Norway
	Hennum 10'; K. Kristiansen 78'	Report	Tichy 43'	Attendance: 25,724; Referee: Helge (Denmark)

16 June 1957 Friendly	Sweden	0–0	Hungary	Sweden

23 June 1957 1958 World Cup qualification	Hungary	4–1	Bulgaria	Budapest, Hungary
	Machos 5', 14', 30'; Bozsik 52'	Report	Kolev 69'	Stadium: Nepstaditon; Attendance: 60,000; Referee: Guigue (France)

15 September 1957 1958 World Cup qualification	Bulgaria	1–2	Hungary	Sofia, Bulgaria
	Diev 43'	Report	Hidegkuti 2', 34'	Stadium: Vasil Levski; Attendance: 50,000; Referee: Bernardi (Italy)

22 September 1957 Friendly	Hungary	1–2	Soviet Union	Hungary

6 October 1957 Friendly	Hungary	2–0	France	Hungary

10 November 1957 1958 World Cup qualification	Hungary	5–0	Norway	Budapest, Hungary
	Sándor 12'; Csordás 20', 71'; Machos 69'; Falch 74' (o.g.)	Report		Attendance: 91,000; Referee: Dusch (West Germany)

22 December 1957 Friendly	West Germany	1–0	Hungary	West Germany

=== 1958 ===
20 April 1958 Friendly	Hungary	2–0	Yugoslavia	Hungary

7 May 1958 Friendly	Scotland	1–1	Hungary	Scotland

8 June 1958 1958 World Cup	Hungary	1–1	Wales	Jernvallen, Sandviken
19:00 (CET)	Bozsik 5'	Report	J. Charles 27'	Attendance: 15,343; Referee: José María Codesal (Uruguay)

12 June 1958 1958 World Cup	Sweden	2–1	Hungary	Råsunda Stadium, Solna
19:00 (CET)	Hamrin 34', 55'	Report	Tichy 77'	Attendance: 38,850; Referee: Jack Mowat (Scotland)

15 June 1958 1958 World Cup	Hungary	4–0	Mexico	Jernvallen, Sandviken
19:00 (CET)	Tichy 19', 46'; Sándor 54'; Bencsics 69'	Report		Attendance: 13,300; Referee: Arne Eriksson (Finland)

17 June 1958 1958 World Cup PO	Wales	2–1	Hungary	Råsunda Stadium, Solna
19:00 (CET)	I. Allchurch 55'; Medwin 76'	Report	Tichy 33'	Attendance: 2,823; Referee: Nikolay Latyshev (Soviet Union)

14 September 1958 Friendly	Poland	1–3	Hungary	Poland

28 September 1958 1960 European Nations' Cup R16	Soviet Union	3–1	Hungary	Central Lenin Stadium, Moscow
19:00	Ilyin 4'; Metreveli 20'; Ivanov 32'	Report	Göröcs 84'	Attendance: 100,572; Referee: Alfred Grill (Austria)

5 October 1958 Friendly	Yugoslavia	4–4	Hungary	Yugoslavia

26 October 1958 Friendly	Romania	1–2	Hungary	Romania

23 November 1958 Friendly	Hungary	3–1	Belgium	Hungary

=== 1959 ===
19 April 1959 Friendly	Hungary	4–0	Yugoslavia	Hungary

1 May 1959 Friendly	East Germany	0–1	Hungary	East Germany

28 June 1959 Friendly	Hungary	2–3	Sweden	Hungary

27 September 1959 1960 European Nations' Cup R16	Hungary	0–1	Soviet Union	Népstadion, Budapest
15:30		Report	Voynov 58'	Attendance: 78,481; Referee: Jozef Kowal (Poland)

11 October 1959 Friendly	Yugoslavia	2–4	Hungary	Yugoslavia

25 October 1959 Dr Gero International Cup	Hungary	8–0	Switzerland	Hungary

8 November 1959 Friendly	Hungary	4–3	West Germany	Hungary

29 November 1959 Dr Gero International Cup	Italy	1–1	Hungary	Italy

=== 1960 ===
22 May 1960 Friendly	Hungary	2–0	England	Hungary

5 June 1960 Friendly	Hungary	3–3	Scotland	Hungary

9 October 1960 Friendly	Hungary	1–1	Yugoslavia	Hungary

30 October 1960 Friendly	Belgium	2–1	Hungary	Brussels

13 November 1960 Friendly	Hungary	1–1	Poland	Hungary

20 November 1960 Friendly	Hungary	2–0	Austria	Hungary

=== 1961 ===
17 February 1961 Friendly	United Arab Republic	0–2	Hungary

16 April 1961	Hungary	2–0	East Germany

30 April 1961	Netherlands	0–3	Hungary

7 May 1961 Friendly	Yugoslavia	2–4	Hungary

28 May 1961 Friendly	Hungary	3–2	Wales

11 June 1961 Friendly	Hungary	1–2	Austria

10 September 1961	East Germany	2–3	Hungary

8 October 1961 Friendly	Austria	2–1	Hungary

22 October 1961	Hungary	3–3	Netherlands

9 December 1961 Friendly	Chile	5–1	Hungary

13 December 1961 Friendly	Chile	0–0	Hungary

23 December 1961 Friendly	Uruguay	1–1	Hungary

=== 1962 ===
18 April 1962 Friendly	Hungary	1–1	Uruguay

29 April 1962 Friendly	Hungary	2–1	Turkey

31 May 1962	Hungary	2–1	England

3 June 1962	Hungary	6–1	Bulgaria

6 June 1962	Hungary	0–0	Argentina

10 June 1962	Czechoslovakia	1–0	Hungary

24 June 1962 Friendly	Austria	1–2	Hungary

2 September 1962 Friendly	Poland	0–2	Hungary

14 October 1962 Friendly	Hungary	0–1	Yugoslavia

28 October 1962 Friendly	Hungary	2–0	Austria

7 November 1962	Hungary	3–1	Wales

11 November 1962 Friendly	France	2–3	Hungary

=== 1963 ===
20 March 1963	Wales	1–1	Hungary

5 May 1963 Friendly	Sweden	2–1	Hungary

19 May 1963 Friendly	Hungary	6–0	Denmark

2 June 1963 Friendly	Czechoslovakia	2–2	Hungary

21 September 1963 Friendly	Soviet Union	1–1	Hungary

6 October 1963 Friendly	Yugoslavia	2–0	Hungary

19 October 1963	East Germany	1–2	Hungary

27 October 1963 Friendly	Hungary	2–1	Austria

3 November 1963	Hungary	3–3	East Germany

=== 1964 ===
25 April 1964	France	1–3	Hungary

3 May 1964 Friendly	Austria	1–0	Hungary

23 May 1964	Hungary	2–1	France

17 June 1964	Spain	2–1	Hungary

20 June 1964	Hungary	3–1	Denmark

4 October 1964 Friendly	Switzerland	0–2	Hungary

11 October 1964 Friendly	Hungary	2–2	Czechoslovakia

25 October 1964 Friendly	Hungary	2–1	Yugoslavia

=== 1965 ===
5 May 1965 Friendly	England	1–0	Hungary

23 May 1965	East Germany	1–1	Hungary

13 June 1965	Austria	0–1	Hungary

27 June 1965 Friendly	Hungary	2–1	Italy

5 September 1965	Hungary	3–0	Austria

9 October 1965	Hungary	3–2	East Germany

=== 1966 ===
3 May 1966 Friendly	Poland	1–1	Hungary

8 May 1966 Friendly	Yugoslavia	2–0	Hungary

5 June 1966 Friendly	Hungary	3–1	Switzerland

13 July 1966	Portugal	3–1	Hungary

15 July 1966	Hungary	3–1	Brazil

20 July 1966	Hungary	3–1	Bulgaria

23 July 1966	Soviet Union	2–1	Hungary

7 September 1966	Netherlands	2–2	Hungary

21 September 1966	Hungary	6–0	Denmark

28 September 1966 Friendly	Hungary	4–2	France

30 October 1966 Friendly	Hungary	3–1	Austria

=== 1967 ===
23 April 1967 Friendly	Hungary	1–0	Yugoslavia

10 May 1967	Hungary	2–1	Netherlands

24 May 1967	Denmark	0–2	Hungary

6 September 1967 Friendly	Austria	1–3	Hungary

27 September 1967	Hungary	3–1	East Germany

29 October 1967	East Germany	1–0	Hungary

=== 1968 ===
4 May 1968	Hungary	2–0	Soviet Union

11 May 1968	Soviet Union	3–0	Hungary

=== 1969 ===
25 May 1969	Hungary	2–0	Czechoslovakia

8 June 1969	Republic of Ireland	1–2	Hungary

15 June 1969	Denmark	3–2	Hungary

14 September 1969	Czechoslovakia	3–3	Hungary

24 September 1969 Friendly	Sweden	2–0	Hungary

22 October 1969	Hungary	3–0	Denmark

5 November 1969	Hungary	4–0	Republic of Ireland

3 December 1969	Czechoslovakia	4–1	Hungary
