= Geert Brusselers =

Dutch football coach and a former player

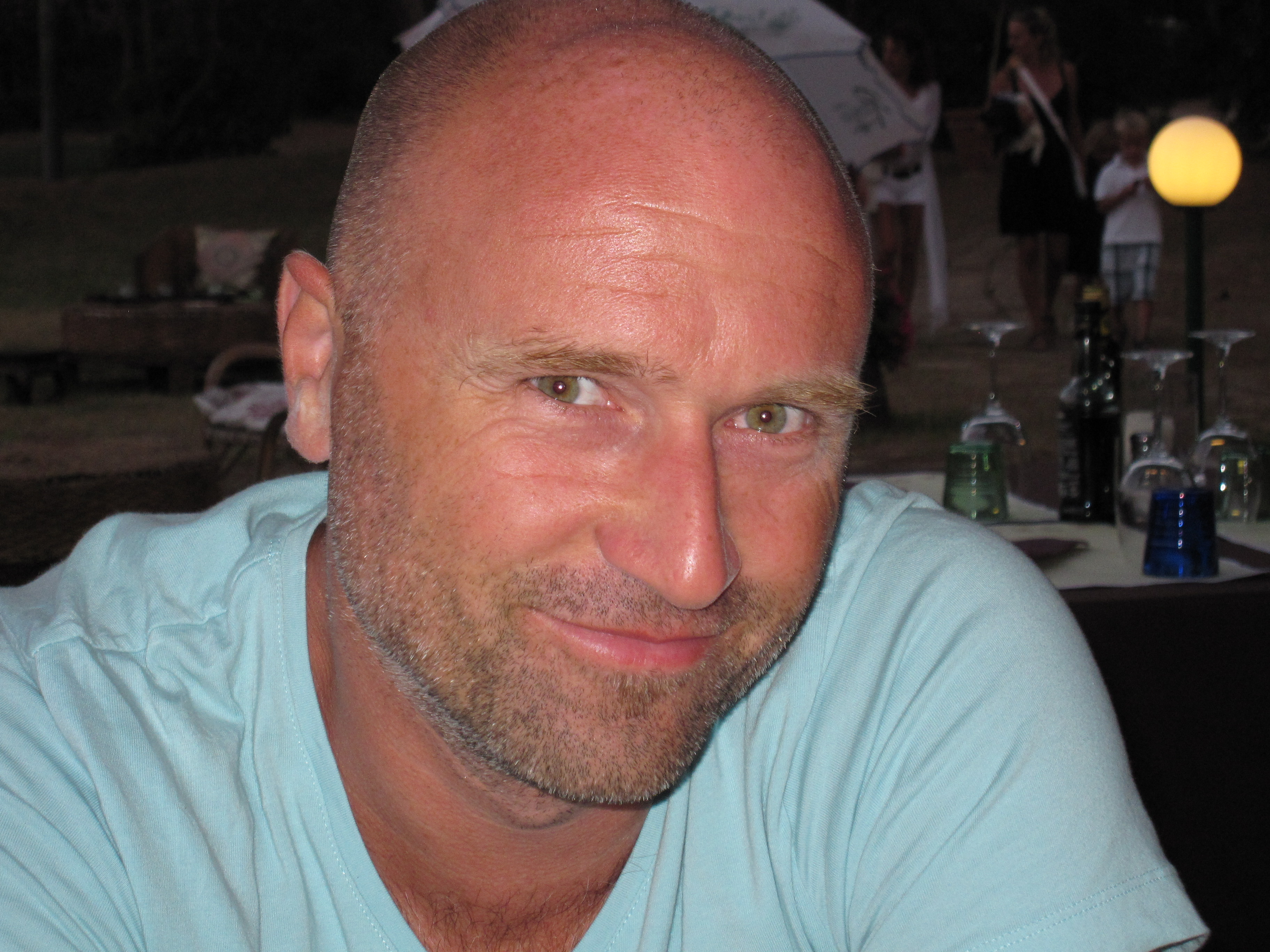
- Geert Brusselers in 2010

Personal information
- Full name: Geert Brusselers
- Date of birth: 6 January 1970 (age 56)
- Place of birth: Eindhoven, Netherlands
- Height: 1.83 m (6 ft 0 in)
- Position: Midfielder

Youth career
- BSC Roosendaal
- Valkenswaard
- PSV

Senior career*
Years	Team	Apps	(Gls)
1989–1991	Fortuna Sittard	51	(2)
1991–1992	FC Den Bosch	33	(13)
1992–1998	NAC	185	(20)
1998–1999	Al-Nasr	29	(13)
1999–2000	Germinal Beerschot	29	(0)
2000–2001	Al-Shaab	29	(8)
2001–2002	Ajax Cape Town	19	(1)
2002–2004	Fortuna Sittard	46	(4)
2004	Calgary Mustangs	27	(3)
Total		448	(64)

Managerial career
- 2010–2011: NAC (U-21 assistant)
- 2011–2014: NAC (U-19)
- 2012–2015: NAC (youth coordinator)
- 2015–2017: PSV (U-19)
- * Club domestic league appearances and goals

Geert Brusselers (born January 6, 1970, in Eindhoven, Netherlands) is a Dutch retired football coach and a former player. He managed the Under-19 squad of PSV.

== Club career ==
Geert began his football career with the amateurs of BSC Roosendaal and Valkenswaard. Afterward he transferred to PSV but never managed to break through into the first squad. After his time with PSV, he played for Fortuna Sittard (1989–1991), FC Den Bosch (1991–1992), NAC Breda (1992–1998), Al Nasr (United Arab Emirates; 1998–1999), Germinal Beerschot (Belgium; 1999–2000), Al-Shaab (United Arab Emirates; 2000–2001), Ajax Cape Town (South Africa; 2001–2002), Fortuna Sittard (2002–2004) and the Calgary Mustangs (Canada; 2004).

== Personal life ==
Geert is the father of former NAC player Bodi Brusselers and a son of former PSV player Toon Brusselers.

In 2022, Brusselers suffered a cerebral infarction during a heart surgery which forced him to retire from football.
