= Bodi Brusselers =

Dutch professional footballer

Personal information
- Date of birth: 12 December 1998 (age 27)
- Place of birth: Bavel, Netherlands
- Height: 1.79 m (5 ft 10 in)
- Position: Attacking midfielder

Youth career
- VV Bavel
- 2009–2016: NAC

Senior career*
Years	Team	Apps	(Gls)
2016–2019	NAC	7	(1)
2018–2019	→ Helmond Sport (loan)	16	(1)
2019–2020	Helmond Sport	10	(1)
2020	Doxa Drama		
2021	EN THOI Lakatamia	8	(0)
- * Club domestic league appearances and goals as of 02:28, 28 January 2020 (UTC)

Bodi Brusselers (born 12 December 1998) is a Dutch retired footballer who played as an attacking midfielder.

== Club career ==
Brusselers is a youth exponent from NAC Breda. He made his Eerste Divisie debut on 5 August 2016 against Jong FC Utrecht.

After having spent the 2018–19 season on loan at Helmond Sport, the club signed him permanently on 24 August 2019. After short spells in Greece and Cyprus, Brusselers had to retire due to persistent injury aged 22 years.

== Personal life ==
Bodi is a son of former NAC player Geert Brusselers and a grandson of former PSV player Toon Brusselers.
