= 1958 FIFA World Cup qualification (AFC/CAF–UEFA play-off) =

- The match programme for the second leg of the play-off
- Event: 1958 FIFA World Cup qualification
Israel	Wales
(Israel)	(Wales)
- Wales won 4–0 on points and qualified for the 1958 FIFA World Cup

First leg
Israel	Wales
0	2
- Date: 15 January 1958
- Venue: Ramat Gan Stadium, Ramat Gan
- Referee: Maurice Guigue (France)
- Attendance: 55,000

Second leg
Wales	Israel
2	0
- Date: 5 February 1958
- Venue: Ninian Park, Cardiff
- Referee: Klaas Schipper (Netherlands)
- Attendance: 38,000

The AFC/CAF–UEFA qualification play-off for the 1958 FIFA World Cup was a two-legged home-and-away association football match between the winners of the African/Asian region, Israel, and a randomly drawn group runner-up from Europe, Wales. The matches were played on 15 January and 5 February 1958 in Ramat Gan and Cardiff, respectively.

Wales had finished second in their qualifying group to Czechoslovakia. Israel had advanced from the AFC/CAF qualification zone without playing a match after several teams withdrew from the competition for political reasons. FIFA introduced a rule that a team could not qualify for a World Cup without playing and organised a play-off match to decide on qualification. Wales were drawn as the opponents and the two sides met in Ramat Gan for the first leg. Wales won the first match 2–0, following goals from Ivor Allchurch and Dave Bowen. The second leg ended with the same result with Allchurch scoring again and Cliff Jones adding a second.

With Wales qualifying, this remains the only time that a country played at the World Cup finals after having been eliminated in the regular qualifiers. This also remains the only time that all four British Home Nations qualified for the World Cup finals. Wales went on to reach the quarter-finals at the 1958 World Cup, before being eliminated by Brazil.

== Background ==
Wales were drawn into group 4 of the European qualifying zone for the 1958 FIFA World Cup, where they faced Czechoslovakia and East Germany. Wales manager Jimmy Murphy was leading the side in World Cup qualifying for the first time and his side won their first match after defeating Czechoslovakia 1–0 in Cardiff following a goal from Roy Vernon, despite missing several players due to injury and withdrawals. Wales travelled to East Germany for their next fixture, but chose to take only twelve players, eleven starters and one substitute, to save money. One of the players, Derek Tapscott, was ruled out of the tie with injury shortly beforehand and John Charles arrived late due to club commitments. The match was East Germany's first competitive fixture in the nation's history and they claimed a 2–1 victory in a match attended by around 110,000.

Wales continued to Czechoslovakia for their next match six days later. The squad had only ten fit players following the match against East Germany and an outcry from the Welsh media prompted Ray Daniel and Des Palmer to be called up as replacements. During the game, Daniel inadvertently gave the opposition the lead after scoring an own goal following a corner kick. The Czechs added a second goal after an hour to secure a 2–0 victory. Wales' hopes of qualification were ended when Czechoslovakia recorded consecutive victories over East Germany. In their final group game, Wales defeated East Germany 4–1 following a hat-trick from Palmer and an own goal from the opposition goalkeeper. As a result, Wales finished second in the group behind Czechoslovakia, and were therefore eliminated from the European qualification zone.

For the qualifying stages of the 1958 FIFA World Cup, Israel were regarded as an Asian team and took part in the African and Asian qualification zone. A total of 11 teams were competing for one direct qualification spot to the 1958 FIFA World Cup finals. Israel were drawn into group 2 of the first round against Turkey. However, their opponents refused to compete in the Asian group, claiming that they should be included in the European qualifying section. The world football governing body, FIFA, subsequently allowed Israel to advance to the second round automatically where they were drawn against Indonesia. However, with ongoing political upheaval in Indonesia, the nation applied to FIFA to play against Israel on neutral ground. Their approach was rejected and Indonesia subsequently withdrew, allowing Israel to advance to the final round.

Israel were paired with Sudan in the last round, with the winner advancing to the World Cup. Sudan had also advanced from the previous round without playing a fixture after Egypt had withdrawn due to Israel's presence owing to tensions between the two nations following the Suez Crisis. Sudan refused to play against Israel for political reasons, so Israel were therefore named the African and Asian qualification zone winners without playing a match. This would have granted Israel qualification to the World Cup, but FIFA decided to introduce a rule that no team would qualify without playing at least one match, except for the defending champions and the hosts. This was because many teams had qualified for previous World Cups without playing due to withdrawals of their opponents. As Israel had advanced automatically through all three rounds under these circumstances, they still had to face another team before they could qualify. Therefore, a play-off match was created by FIFA between Israel and the runner-up of a group from one of the other qualifying regions, UEFA, CONMEBOL and NAFC/CCCF, where the teams would play against each other on a home-and-away basis. The winner of this play-off would then directly qualify for the 1958 World Cup in Sweden. Therefore, effectively, only 0.5 places were granted to Africa and Asia for the finals.

A drawing of lots took place in December 1957 to determine which team would face Israel in the play-offs. Ahead of the draw, Uruguay withdrew, while Italy and Northern Ireland had not finished their qualification group, leaving nine teams in the draw. Belgium were selected first but rejected the opportunity so the draw was made again and Wales were selected and would therefore take part in the play-off against Israel. Therefore, the play-off winners would make their World Cup finals debut, as both Israel and Wales had never previously qualified.

== Summary ==
Pos	Team	Pld	W	D	L	GF	GA	GD	Pts	Qualification	(Wales)	(Israel)
1	Wales	2	2	0	0	4	0	+4	4	1958 FIFA World Cup	—	2–0
2	Israel	2	0	0	2	0	4	−4	0		0–2	—

Source: FIFA

== Matches ==
=== First leg ===
==== Summary ====
Israel goalkeeper Ya'akov Hodorov catches the ball under pressure during the first leg

Wales travelled to Israel with little support, although 90 Welsh servicemen did secure a flight from a military base in Cyprus to attend the match. An error in preparation meant the side arrived in Israel without a ball. As a result, the team were limited to physical training beforehand. Wales were heavy favourites ahead of the tie with their only other weakness believed to be the heat, with temperatures expected to be around 80 °F (27 °C). Murphy banned his players from using the hotel pool during their stay.

The match was attended by around 55,000 spectators, including the British ambassador to Israel. Wales had an early goal ruled out after Ivor Allchurch was caught offside before he found the net again after 38 minutes to open the scoring. After receiving a pass from Terry Medwin, Allchurch found space on the edge of the penalty area and scored from 20 yards (18 m) out. Allchurch continued to cause problems for the opposition defence, shooting wide after collecting a Stuart Williams free-kick and drawing a save from Israeli goalkeeper Ya'akov Hodorov.

Wales eventually scored a second through Dave Bowen midway through the second half, also from 20 yards out. Wales received a blow late in the game when John Charles went down injured. He returned to the field to finish the game but struggled for the final minutes of the game. The victory was the first time Wales had won a match outside the United Kingdom.

==== Details ====
15 January 1958

Israel	0–2	Wales
	Report	I. Allchurch 38'; Bowen 63'

Ramat Gan Stadium, Ramat Gan
Attendance: 55,000
Referee: Maurice Guigue (France)

Israel	Wales

GK	Ya'akov Hodorov
DF	Avraham Levkowitch
DF	Hanoch Mordkowitch
DF	Noah Reznik
MF	Nahum Stelmach
MF	Gideon Tish
FW	Aharon Amar
FW	Yehoshua Glazer
FW	Yosef Goldstein
FW	Itzhak Nahmias
FW	Zeharia Ratzabi
Manager:
Moshe Varon

GK	Jack Kelsey
DF	Mel Hopkins
DF	Stuart Williams
DF	Mel Charles
MF	Dave Bowen
MF	Alan Harrington
FW	John Charles
FW	Len Allchurch
FW	Terry Medwin
FW	Ivor Allchurch
FW	Cliff Jones
Manager:
Jimmy Murphy

=== Second leg ===
==== Summary ====
Wales remained heavy favourites to advance following the first leg. They made minor changes to the side, Medwin and John Charles switched positions to allow the latter to play centre-forward. The only other change saw Ron Hewitt make his international debut in place of Len Allchurch. Israel made one change to their starting eleven from the first leg, Boshos Gegosian replaced Zebaria Tetzabi. Yosef Goldstein had been a doubt with an ankle injury but recovered to play.

Already trailing by two goals from the first leg, Israel struggled to impose themselves on the second leg as Wales again dominated the tie. Israeli goalkeeper Hodorov won plaudits for his performance in the match, making several saves to deny Wales a goal. His efforts also included using his body to stop advancing players; one collision with an opposition player left him with a broken nose and concussion but he continued playing. Israel adopted a more physical style of play in the second leg and were cited by the referee on several occasions for "frequent use ... of the late tackle, of body checking and other obstructionist methods." Charles, who had recovered from his injury in the first leg, was the main target of these methods and they proved effective as he struggled to gain a foothold in the game. The impetus of the Welsh attack was instead provided by Cliff Jones and Medwin.

Israel struggled to create many attacking opportunities, their best chance of the game fell to Yehoshua Glazer who was denied by Wales goalkeeper Jack Kelsey, who saved with his knee. Wales were frustrated in front of goal for much of the match despite the Israeli defence being "beset by wave after wave of red shirts". Wales scored their first goal after 76 minutes through Allchurch who held off several tackles before shooting into the roof of the net from a narrow angle. Mewdin's forward play continued to excel and he created the second goal after breaking into the Israeli penalty area before pulling the ball back across the box. Charles missed the first attempt but the ball fell to Jones who added a second for Wales.

==== Details ====
5 February 1958

Wales	2–0	Israel
I. Allchurch 76'; Jones 80'	Report

Ninian Park, Cardiff
Attendance: 38,000
Referee: Klaas Schipper (Netherlands)

Wales	Israel

GK	Jack Kelsey
DF	Mel Hopkins
DF	Stuart Williams
DF	Mel Charles
MF	Dave Bowen
MF	Alan Harrington
FW	John Charles
FW	Ron Hewitt
FW	Terry Medwin
FW	Ivor Allchurch
FW	Cliff Jones
Manager:
Jimmy Murphy

GK	Ya'akov Hodorov
DF	Avraham Levkowitch
DF	Hanoch Mordkowitch
DF	Noah Reznik
MF	Nahum Stelmach
MF	Gideon Tish
FW	Aharon Amar
FW	Yehoshua Glazer
FW	Yosef Goldstein
FW	Itzhak Nahmias
FW	Boshos Gegosian
Manager:
Moshe Varon

== Aftermath ==
As of March 2023, Wales' victory remains the only time a team have qualified for a World Cup having been eliminated from the normal qualifying process. It also remains the only time that all four Home Nations have qualified for a World Cup. Despite the clear margin of victory, newspaper reports after the game were scathing of Wales' performance with The Times remarking that Wales would "do little more than make the journey to Scandinavia". At the World Cup, Wales advanced from their group after winning a play-off match against Hungary. In the quarter-finals, they were eliminated by Brazil after losing 1–0.

Murphy's attendance at the second leg meant he was forced to miss a match in his other role as assistant manager to Matt Busby at Manchester United. The following night, United played Red Star Belgrade in the European Cup and were travelling back to Manchester via Munich when the team's airplane crashed on the runway at Munich-Riem Airport, resulting in the Munich air disaster which caused 23 fatalities.

Israel would eventually qualify for their currently only World Cup in 1970, where they were eliminated in the group stage, while Wales would not qualify for a World Cup again until 2022.
