= Eine =

Eine may refer to:

- EINE, a text editor
- Eine (river), in Germany
- Eine, Belgium, a village
- Ben Eine (born 1970), British street artist
