= James W. Murphy =

James W. Murphy may refer to:

- James W. Murphy (politician) (1852–?), Wisconsin state legislator
- James William Murphy (1858–1927), United States Representative from Wisconsin
- James Murphy (soccer, born 1936), retired American soccer player
- James W. Murphy (horse trainer) (1926–2009), America racehorse trainer - namesake of the James W. Murphy Stakes
