= 1963–64 in Belgian football =

Football in Belgium
- Season: 1963–64

The 1963–64 season was the 61st season of competitive football in Belgium. RSC Anderlechtois won their 10th Division I title. Standard Liège entered the 1963–64 European Champion Clubs' Cup as Belgian title holder and RFC Liégeois and ARA La Gantoise entered the 1963–64 Inter-Cities Fairs Cup. The Belgian Cup competition resumed to allow the cup winner to enter the 1964–65 European Cup Winners' Cup, and was won by ARA La Gantoise against KFC Diest (4-2 after extra time). The Belgium national football team played 6 friendly games (2 wins, 2 draws, 2 losses).

== Overview ==
At the end of the season, KFC Turnhout and RFC Malinois were relegated to Division II and were replaced in Division I by RU Saint-Gilloise and R Tilleur FC from Division II.
The bottom 2 clubs in Division II (KRC Mechelen and K Kortrijk Sport) were relegated to Division III, to be replaced by K Waterschei SV Thor Genk and K Sint-Niklaasse SK from Division III.
The bottom clubs of each Division III league (K Tongerse SV Cercle, K Daring Club Leuven, KFC Eeklo and KFC Waeslandia Burcht) were relegated to the Promotion, to be replaced by K Van Neste Genootschap Oostende, RCS Schaerbeek, KFC Winterslag and R Wavre Sports from Promotion.

== National team ==
Date	Venue	Opponents	Score*	Comp	Belgium scorers
October 20, 1963	Olympic Stadium, Amsterdam (A)	Netherlands	1-1	F	Paul Van Den Berg
December 1, 1963	Mestalla Stadium, Valencia (A)	Spain	2-1	F	Paul Van Den Berg, Wilfried Puis
December 25, 1963	Parc des Princes, Paris (A)	France	2-1	F	Paul Van Himst (2)
March 22, 1964	Bosuilstadion, Antwerp (H)	Netherlands	0-0	F
April 15, 1964	Charmilles Stadium, Geneva (A)	Switzerland	0-2	F
May 3, 1964	Heysel Stadium, Brussels (H)	Portugal	1-2	F	Paul Van Den Berg

* Belgium score given first

Key

- H = Home match
- A = Away match
- N = On neutral ground
- F = Friendly
- o.g. = own goal

== European competitions ==
Standard Liège lost in the preliminary round of the 1963–64 European Champion Clubs' Cup to IFK Norrköping of Sweden (won 1–0 at home, lost 0–2 away).

2 Belgian clubs entered the Inter-Cities Fairs Cup (for the first time):
In the First Round, RFC Liégeois defeated FC Aris Bonnevoie of Luxembourg (win 2–0 away, drew 0–0 at home) while ARA La Gantoise were eliminated by FC Köln of West Germany (lost 1–3 away, drew 1–1 at home).
In the Second Round, RFC Liégeois defeated Arsenal FC (drew 1–1 away, won 3–1 at home).
In the Quarter Finals, they beat Spartak Brno of Czechoslovakia (won 2–0 at home, lost 0–2 away, won 1–0 in the play-off game).
In the Semifinals, RFC Liégeois lost against Real Zaragoza of Spain (win 1–0 at home, lost 1–2 away, lost 0–2 in the play-off game).

== Honours ==
Competition	Winner
Division I	RSC Anderlechtois
Cup	ARA La Gantoise
Division II	RU Saint-Gilloise
Division III	K Waterschei SV Thor Genk and K Sint-Niklaasse SK
Promotion	K Van Neste Genootschap Oostende, RCS Schaerbeek, KFC Winterslag and R Wavre Sports

== Final league tables ==
=== Premier Division ===
- 1963-64 Top scorer: Paul Van Himst (RSC Anderlechtois) with 26 goals.
- 1963 Golden Shoe: Jean Nicolay (Standard Liège)
