= Ya'akov Hodorov =

Israeli footballer

Ya'akov Hodorov יעקב חודורוב

Personal information
- Full name: Ya'akov Hodorov
- Date of birth: 16 June 1927
- Place of birth: Rishon LeZion, Mandatory Palestine
- Date of death: 31 December 2006 (aged 79)
- Place of death: Jerusalem, Israel
- Position: Goalkeeper

Senior career*
Years	Team	Apps	(Gls)
1942–44	Maccabi Rishon LeZion		
1944–47	Hapoel Rishon LeZion		
1947–62	Hapoel Tel Aviv		
1962–64	Hapoel Ramat Gan		
1964–65	Shimshon Tel Aviv		
1965–66	Hapoel Holon		

International career
1949–64	Israel	31	(0)
Medal record
Men's football
Representing Israel
AFC Asian Cup
Runner-up	1956 Hong Kong
Runner-up	1960 South Korea
- * Club domestic league appearances and goals

Ya'akov "Yankele" Hodorov (Hebrew: יעקב חודורוב; 16 June 1927 – 31 December 2006) was an Israeli football goalkeeper in the 1940s, 1950s, and 1960s. He is one Israel's best goalkeepers of all time and the leading goalkeeper of his generation.

== Football career ==
Hodorov started his football career at Maccabi Rishon LeZion at the age of 15. After a few years, he moved to local rival Hapoel Rishon LeZion, where he first got national recognition as the team reached the cup final in 1946. Shortly afterward he moved to Hapoel Tel Aviv, the club where he stayed for most of his career. At Hapoel Tel Aviv he won the Israeli league championship in 1957 and the Israeli state cup in 1960. Later he joined Hapoel Ramat Gan and won another league title in 1964, and afterward played at Shimshon Tel Aviv and ended his career with Hapoel Holon, where he also had a short spell as coach.

He was 5 ft 10in (1.78 m) tall and nicknamed "the Bird".

Hodorov made his debut for the national team in a friendly match against Cyprus in 1949, and for the next decade played in almost all international matches. He soon became the hero of the team that struggled against European opponents. He reached his peak in the latter half of the 1950s.

The most memorable match of his career was in 1958 FIFA World Cup qualification against Wales at Cardiff, in which he suffered a broken nose in a collision with Welsh striker John Charles, but continued to play and made dozens of acrobatic saves.

Other notable matches were against USSR at Ramat Gan Stadium in 1956 Olympic qualification, where he played with a broken finger, and Israel's sensational win over Yugoslavia at Belgrade in 1960 Olympic qualification.

Hodorov received lucrative offers from several European professional clubs, including Arsenal FC, but he turned them down and chose to play his entire career in the then-amateur Israeli league.

== Awards and recognition ==
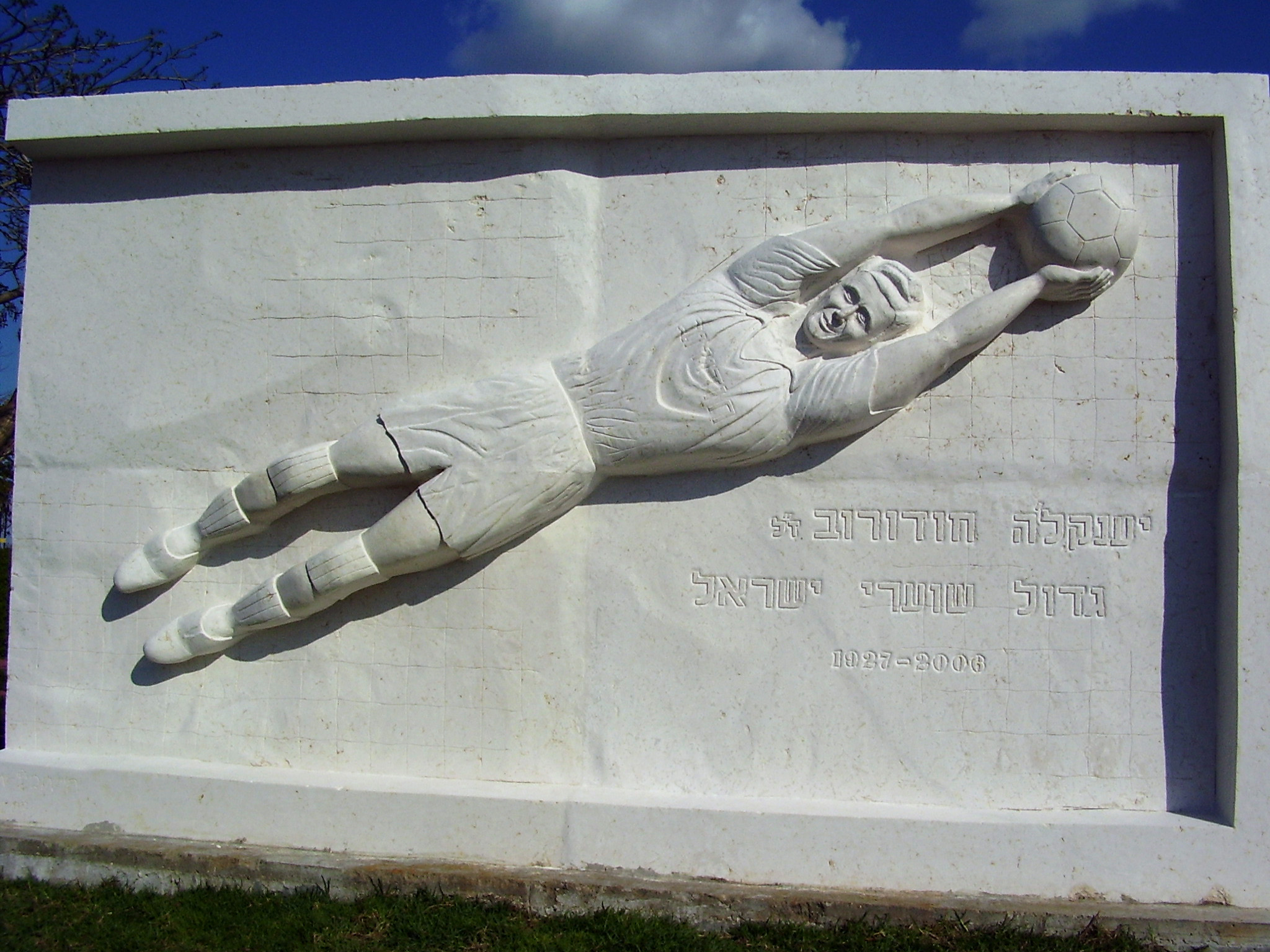
Relief of Hodorov, Haberfeld Stadium, Rishon Lezion

In 2006, Hodorov was awarded the Israel Prize for his contribution to sports, one of few sportspeople who received this honour. Several days before he was due to receive the prize he suffered a stroke and was unable to attend the ceremony. This stroke eventually led to his death several months later on New Year's Eve 2006 at the age of 79.

== In popular culture ==
He is the last footballer (before repetition in the fade-out) to be mentioned in Arik Einstein's song Ve'ele Shemot (these are the names) that repeats several times the text: "And we will finish at Hodorov".

== Honours ==
Israel

- AFC Asian Cup: Runner-up, 1956, 1960

== See also ==
- List of Israel Prize recipients
