= 1958 FIFA World Cup qualification – UEFA Group 3 =

Football tournament

The three teams in this group played against each other on a home-and-away basis. The group winner Hungary qualified for the sixth FIFA World Cup held in Sweden.

== Table ==
Pos	Team	Pld	W	D	L	GF	GA	GR	Pts	Qualification	Hungary national football team	Bulgaria national football team	Norway national football team
1	Hungary	4	3	0	1	12	4	3.000	6	Qualification to 1958 FIFA World Cup	—	4–1	5–0
2	Bulgaria	4	2	0	2	11	7	1.571	4		1–2	—	7–0
3	Norway	4	1	0	3	3	15	0.200	2		2–1	1–2	—

Source: FIFA

== Matches ==
22 May 1957

Norway	1 – 2	Bulgaria
Hennum 47'	Report	G. Dimitrov 38', 75'

Ullevaal, Oslo, Norway
Attendance: 27,542
Referee: Lindberg (Sweden)

12 June 1957

Norway	2 – 1	Hungary
Hennum 10'; K. Kristiansen 78'	Report	Tichy 43'

Attendance: 25,724
Referee: Helge (Denmark)

23 June 1957

Hungary	4 – 1	Bulgaria
Machos 5', 14', 30'; Bozsik 52'	Report	Kolev 69'

Népstadion, Budapest, Hungary
Attendance: 60,000
Referee: Guigue (France)

15 September 1957

Bulgaria	1 – 2	Hungary
Diev 43'	Report	Hidegkuti 2', 34'

Vasil Levski, Sofia, Bulgaria
Attendance: 50,000
Referee: Bernardi (Italy)

3 November 1957

Bulgaria	7 – 0	Norway
Iliev 6', 60', 74'; Panayotov 29', 32'; Yanev 59'; Debarski 77'	Report

Vasil Levski, Sofia, Bulgaria
Attendance: 22,120
Referee: Macko (Czechoslovakia)

10 November 1957

Hungary	5 – 0	Norway
Sándor 12'; Csordás 20', 71'; Machos 69'; Falch 74' (o.g.)	Report

Attendance: 91,000
Referee: Dusch (West Germany)
