= André Van Herpe =

Belgian footballer (1933–2024)

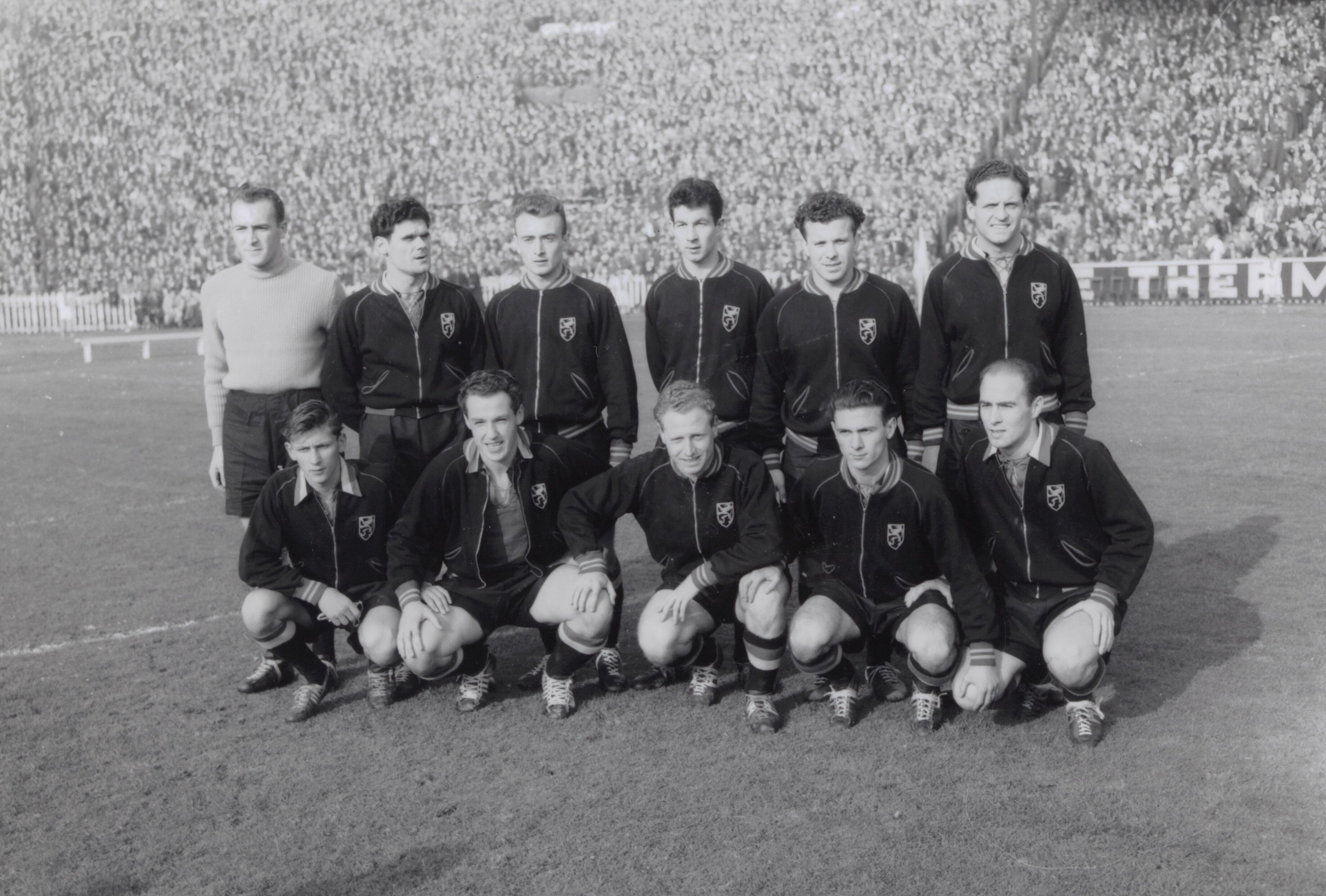
- Van Herpe with the Belgium national team in 1956

Personal information
- Date of birth: 26 October 1933
- Place of birth: Eine, Belgium
- Date of death: 26 March 2024 (aged 90)
- Position: Midfielder

Youth career
- Merksplas SK

Senior career*
Years	Team	Apps	(Gls)
1952–1962	ARA La Gantoise		
1962–1963	Racing Club de Bruxelles		
1963–1964	Racing White		
1964–1966	Stade Kortrijk		

International career
1952–1954	Belgium U19	3	(0)
1956–1958	Belgium	7	(1)
- * Club domestic league appearances and goals

André Van Herpe (26 October 1933 – 26 March 2024) was a Belgian footballer who played as a midfielder, notably for ARA La Gantoise. He made seven appearances for the Belgium national team from 1956 to 1958. He was also named in Belgium's squad for the qualification tournament for the 1958 FIFA World Cup.

== Career ==
Van Herpe was born in Eine, Belgium. He started playing football aged 12 at Merksplas SK. From 1952 to 1962 he played for ARA La Gantoise in Ghent, finishing second in the league in 1954–55 and third three times in 1953–54, 1956–57 and 1957–58. He moved to Racing Club de Bruxelles at the age of 28 and later to Stade Kortrijk.

== Style of play ==
Van Herpe's outstanding attributes were his technique, passing and work ethic. His teammate Léon Mokuna called him ARA La Gantoise's best player.

== Death ==
Van Herpe died on 26 March 2024, at the age of 90. His death was announced by his former club K.A.A. Gent on 28 March 2024.
