= Jef Van Gool =

Belgian footballer

Personal information
- Date of birth: 27 April 1935 (age 91)
- Place of birth: Belgium
- Position: Striker

Senior career*
Years	Team	Apps	(Gls)
1954–1966	Royal Antwerp	250	(124)
1966–1970	Mons		
1970–1973	Sparta Linkeroever FC		
- * Club domestic league appearances and goals

Jef Van Gool (born 27 April 1935) was a Belgian football player who finished top scorer of the Belgian First Division with 25 goals (together with Jozef Vliers) in 1958 while playing for Antwerp.
