= 1958 FIFA World Cup qualification – UEFA Group 1 =

Football tournament

The three teams in this group played against each other on a home-and-away basis. The group winner England qualified for the sixth FIFA World Cup held in Sweden.

== Standings ==
| Pos | Team | Pld | W | D | L | GF | GA | GR | Pts | Qualification | England national football team | Republic of Ireland national football team | Denmark national football team |
|---|---|---|---|---|---|---|---|---|---|---|---|---|---|
| 1 | England | 4 | 3 | 1 | 0 | 15 | 5 | 3.000 | 7 | Qualification to 1958 FIFA World Cup | — | 5–1 | 5–2 |
| 2 | Republic of Ireland | 4 | 2 | 1 | 1 | 6 | 7 | 0.857 | 5 | | 1–1 | — | 2–1 |
| 3 | Denmark | 4 | 0 | 0 | 4 | 4 | 13 | 0.308 | 0 | | 1–4 | 0–2 | — |

Source: FIFA

== Matches ==
3 October 1956

| Republic of Ireland | 2 – 1 | Denmark |
|---|---|---|
| Curtis 27'; Gavin 45' (pen.) | Report | Aa. Jensen 85' |

Dalymount Park, Dublin, Ireland
Attendance: 36,000
Referee: Bond (England)

5 December 1956

| England | 5 – 2 | Denmark |
|---|---|---|
| Taylor 2', 22', 53'; Edwards 66', 77' | Report | O. Nielsen 27', 64' |

Attendance: 60,000
Referee: Guigue (France)

8 May 1957

| England | 5 – 1 | Republic of Ireland |
|---|---|---|
| Taylor 10', 19', 40'; Atyeo 38', 90' | Report | Curtis 56' |

Wembley Stadium (1923), London, England
Attendance: 52,000
Referee: Phillips (Scotland)

15 May 1957

| Denmark | 1 – 4 | England |
|---|---|---|
| J. Jensen 27' | Report | Haynes 28'; Taylor 71', 86'; Atyeo 75' |

Attendance: 35,000
Referee: Dusch (West Germany)

19 May 1957

| Republic of Ireland | 1 – 1 | England |
|---|---|---|
| Ringstead 3' | Report | Atyeo 90' |

Dalymount Park, Dublin, Ireland
Attendance: 36,000
Referee: Philips (Scotland)

2 October 1957

| Denmark | 0 – 2 | Republic of Ireland |
|---|---|---|
| | Report | Cummins 53'; Curtis 61' |

Attendance: 28,000
Referee: Schulz (East Germany)
