= Pinula Contreras =

Guatemalan football player and coach (1934–2026)

Personal information
- Full name: Francisco López Contreras
- Date of birth: 17 September 1934
- Place of birth: Santa Catarina Pinula, Guatemala Department, Guatemala
- Date of death: 13 September 2026 (aged 91)
- Position: Outside right

Senior career*
Years	Team	Apps	(Gls)
1955–1968	Comunicaciones		

International career
1957–	Guatemala		
Medal record
Men's football
Representing Guatemala
CONCACAF Championship
Runner-up	1965 Guatemala
- * Club domestic league appearances and goals

Francisco "Pinula" López Contreras (17 September 1934 – 13 September 2026) was a Guatemalan football player and coach. He played the majority of his playing career at C.S.D. Comunicaciones of Guatemala City and was also a member of the Guatemala national team, playing in two World Cup qualifying campaigns.

== Club career ==
Born in Santa Catarina Pinula, source of his nickname, López played as an outside right and made his domestic league debut with Comunicaciones in 1955, and would go on to play 14 seasons at that club, winning four league titles, one domestic cup, and four Campeón de Campeones (Guatemala Super Cup). In 1956 he helped Comunicaciones win their first ever league title by scoring the championship-winning goal against arch-rivals CSD Municipal. Two seasons later he would score again in the decisive match against Xelajú M.C. at the Estadio Mario Camposeco in a 3–0 win that gave the title to Comunicaciones.

On 18 January 1959, Comunicaciones played a friendly match against Santos FC, with Brazil's Pelé in its squad, at the Estadio Mateo Flores. Santos took a 2–0 lead with goals by Pelé and Pepe, and nine minutes before the match ended, "Pinula" made it 2–1.

Facing Municipal again in the title match of the 1959-60 season, Comunicaciones won 2–1 with the 1–1 equalizer netted by "Pinula". The title allowed Comunicaciones to compete in the first CONCACAF Champions' Cup in 1962, with "Pinula" scoring against C.D. Águila in the first round, and helping the team reach the final of the tournament against Guadalajara. He was also part of the Comunicaciones squad that played an exhibition match against Spanish club Real Madrid on 20 August 1960.

== International career ==
"Pinula" was part of the Guatemala national team which entered World Cup qualification for the first time during the 1958 World Cup qualifiers, and continued to represent the team four years later for the 1962 process. During the first stage of the latter, in a 4–4 draw against Costa Rica, "Pinula" scored three goals becoming the only Guatemalan player to score a hat-trick against Costa Rica in a World Cup qualification match. In total, he scored five goals in six World Cup qualification matches. He also played at the 1961 CCCF Championship and at the 1963 CONCACAF Championship.

== Coaching career ==
López Contreras has been a coach in the youth divisions of Comunicaciones, as well as of the senior team. He has also managed a number of teams in lower divisions, including Coatepeque, Nueva Santa Rosa, Santa Catarina Pinula, Mixco, Fraijanes, Villa Canales, and Boca del Monte. The municipal stadium of Santa Catarina Pinula, the Estadio Pinula Contreras, was renamed in his honor.

== Death ==
Contreras died on 13 September 2026, four days before his 92nd birthday.

== Honours ==
Guatemala

- CONCACAF Championship: Runner-up, 1965
