= Jabra Al-Zarqa =

Palestinian and Syrian footballer

Personal information
- Full name: Jabra Al-Zarqa
- Place of birth: Haifa, Mandatory Palestine
- Position: Forward

Senior career*
Years	Team	Apps	(Gls)
1944–1948	Shabab Al-Arab Haifa		
1949	Al-Ahli SC		
1950–1960	Al-Jaish SC		
1951	Shabiba Mazraa		

International career
1951–1957	Syria		(1+)
- * Club domestic league appearances and goals

Jabra Al-Zarqa (Arabic: جبرا الزرقا) is a former footballer. Born in Mandatory Palestine, he represented the Syria national team.

Al-Zarqa started his career at Shabab Al-Arab Haifa, where in 1945, after scoring a hat-trick in a 4–3 win against British army team Wanderers, he was offered a contract by Arsenal. After fleeing Haifa in 1948, Al-Zarqa played in Jordan for Al Ahli SC. He retired from football in 1960. He also played for Shabiba Mazraa in Lebanon, and scored two goals in the 1951 Lebanese FA Cup final against Nejmeh.

He was part of Syria's team at the 1951 Mediterranean Games and helped them win the 1957 Arab Games. Al-Zarqa scored Syria's first ever goal in FIFA World Cup qualification, in a 1–1 draw with Sudan during 1958 FIFA World Cup qualification.

In March 2022, he was chosen by the IFFHS for their men's all-time Palestine dream team.
