= Alfredo Hernández (footballer, born 1935) =

Mexican footballer (1935–2003)

Personal information
- Full name: Alfredo Rafael Hernández García
- Date of birth: 18 June 1935
- Place of birth: Mexico
- Date of death: 17 January 2003 (aged 67)
- Position: Midfielder

Senior career*
Years	Team	Apps	(Gls)
- Club León
- C.F. Monterrey

International career
1957–1962	Mexico	6	(2)
- * Club domestic league appearances and goals

Alfredo Rafael Hernández García (18 June 1935 – 17 January 2003), nicknamed Fello, was a Mexican football midfielder who played for Mexico in the 1958 and 1962 FIFA World Cups. He also played for Club León and C.F. Monterrey.

Hernández died on 17 January 2003, at the age of 67.
