= Álvaro Murillo =

Costa Rican footballer (1930-1985)

Personal information
- Full name: Álvaro Murillo Rojas
- Date of birth: 24 November 1930
- Place of birth: San Pedro de Poás, Costa Rica
- Date of death: 28 June 1985 (aged 54)
- Place of death: Heredia, Costa Rica
- Position: Striker

Youth career
- 1940: Oriente de Heredia
- 1941–1945: Herediano

Senior career*
Years	Team	Apps	(Gls)
1945–1947	Orión		
1947–1960	Deportivo Saprissa		
1962–1964	Orión		
1964	Deportivo Saprissa		

International career
1950–1960	Costa Rica	36	(9)
- * Club domestic league appearances and goals

Álvaro Murillo Rojas (24 November 1930 - 28 June 1985) was a Costa Rican footballer.

He was one of the top goal scorers in the history of the Primera División de Costa Rica, and was considered to be one of the best forwards in Costa Rica during the 1950s. In 1979, he was voted best Costa Rican football player of all-time by fans, journalists, former players and officials.

== Club career ==
Murillo came through the Herediano youth system and started his senior career with Orión in 1945. He then played almost his entire career with Deportivo Saprissa, winning three league titles and holding the club record for most goals scored until it was broken in the 1970s by Edgar Marín.

Murillo was part of the Saprissa team that went on a World Tour in 1959, becoming the first Latin American football squad to ever undertake such a trip. He was also the Tour's top goal scorer, which led to offers from European clubs such as Genoa of Italy, Huracán of Argentina and Austria Wien, as well as teams from Venezuela and Mexico. However, Murillo preferred to stay with Saprissa in Costa Rica because he was going to school during that period of time.

== International career ==
With Costa Rica's national team, Murillo was part of the Chaparritos de Oro squad that won a silver medal in the Pan-American Games held in Buenos Aires during the 1950s. He earned a total of 36 caps, scoring 9 goals and represented his country in 6 FIFA World Cup qualification matches.

== Retirement ==
After retiring as a players, Murillo was member of the board of Saprissa.

== Personal life and death ==
Rojas was born to Carlos Murillo and Carmen Rojas and had a brother and sister. He was married to Julieta Jenkins and they had 5 children themselves. He died in 1985 in Heredia, aged 54.
