= Ginter Gawlik =

Polish footballer (1930–2005)

Personal information
- Date of birth: 5 December 1930
- Place of birth: Borsigwerk, Germany
- Date of death: 22 August 2005 (aged 74)
- Place of death: Würzburg, Germany
- Height: 1.80 m (5 ft 11 in)
- Positions: Defender; midfielder

Senior career*
Years	Team	Apps	(Gls)
1942–1944	Reichsbahn SV Borsigwerk		
1945–1950	Górnik Biskupice		
1950–1964	Górnik Zabrze	136	(21)
1964–1965	Polonia Sydney		
1966–1967	Polonia Sydney		

International career
1957–1958	Poland	7	(1)

Managerial career
- 1966–1967: Polonia Sydney (player-manager)
- * Club domestic league appearances and goals

Ginter Gawlik (5 December 1930 – 22 August 2005) was a Polish footballer. He spent most of career playing for Polish team Górnik Zabrze.

Gawlik, who was not raised in Poland (until 1945, Zabrze, then called Hindenburg, belonged to Germany), started his career in the mid-1940s for the German team Reichsbahn SV Borsigwerk. After 1945, he played for Górnik Biskupice and in 1950 he moved to Górnik Zabrze, a powerhouse of Polish football. While playing for Górnik, the team won 5 Polish football championships in the late 1950s and early 1960s. Also, he played for the Poland national team, scoring one goal in 7 games. His debut took place on 23 June 1957 in Chorzów, when Poland beat the Soviet Union 2–1.

== Honours ==
Górnik Zabrze

- Ekstraklasa: 1957, 1959, 1961, 1962–63, 1963–64
