= Sun Fucheng =

Chinese football coach and player

Sun Fucheng 孙福成
Personal information
- Full name: Sun Fucheng
- Date of birth: 19 November 1927
- Place of birth: Dalian, Liaoning, China
- Date of death: 3 April 1983 (aged 55)
- Place of death: Beijing, China
- Position: Forward

Senior career*
Years	Team	Apps	(Gls)
1951–1959	Liaoning		
1959–1963	Beijing		

International career
1951–1960	China	2	(1)

Managerial career
- 1960–1973: Beijing
- * Club domestic league appearances and goals

Sun Fucheng (Chinese: 孙福成;November 19, 1927 – April 3, 1983) was a Chinese international football player and coach. As a player, he was one of the first footballers to play for the People's Republic of China at the international level, and as a coach, he was the very managers to manage a fully professional Chinese football club, with his stint at Beijing FC.

== Football career ==
Sun Fucheng wa born in Dalian. in 1951, Sun began his football career playing for the Liaoning FC.in 1952, he was selected to take part in China. in 1957, Sun take part in China's first ever qualification for the 1958 FIFA World Cup. after 1960, Sun went to Beijing FC as a player and manager.

== Management career ==
Sun Fucheng was retired in 1963, then he work as management of Beijing FC until 1973.

== Death ==
On April 3, 1983, Sun Fucheng died of lung cancer in Beijing, age 56.
