= Mauri Vanhanen =

Finnish footballer (1931–2014)

Personal information
- Date of birth: 1 June 1931
- Place of birth: Kotka, Finland
- Date of death: 24 April 2014 (aged 82)
- Position: Forward

Senior career*
Years	Team	Apps	(Gls)
1948–1964	Kotkan Työväen Palloilijat		

International career
1957	Finland	3	(2)
- * Club domestic league appearances and goals

Mauri Vanhanen (1 June 1931 – 24 April 2014) was a Finnish footballer who played as a forward. He made three appearances for the Finland national team in 1957. He died on 24 April 2014, at the age of 82.
