= Ove Bech Nielsen =

Danish footballer (1932–2016)

Personal information
- Date of birth: 3 August 1932
- Place of birth: Copenhagen, Denmark
- Date of death: 24 February 2016 (aged 83)

International career
Years	Team	Apps	(Gls)
1954–1958	Denmark	8	(3)

Ove Bech Nielsen (3 August 1932 – 24 February 2016) was a Danish footballer. Between 1951 and 1958 he played for Akademisk Boldklub. He played in eight matches for the Denmark national football team from 1954 to 1958. He was also named in Denmark's squad for the qualification tournament for the 1958 FIFA World Cup.
