= Wang Lu (footballer) =

Chinese football player and manager

Wang Lu 王陆
Personal information
- Full name: Wang Lu
- Date of birth: 1930
- Place of birth: Shunyi, Hebei, China
- Date of death: February 7, 2007 (aged 76–77)
- Place of death: Beijing, China
- Position: Forward

Senior career*
Years	Team	Apps	(Gls)
- Beijing

International career
1953–1957	China	6	(2)

Managerial career
- Beijing
- Beijing sport college
- Beijing Youth Team
- * Club domestic league appearances and goals as of May 7, 2010

Wang Lu (Chinese: 王陆; 1930 – February 7, 2007) was a Chinese football player and manager.

== Playing career ==
Wang Lu was called up to the China national football team and was the captain in 1953. In 1954, China sent China youth football team to Hungary to study, Wang Lu was the coach and captain. In 1957, he represented China in the qualification for the 1958 FIFA World Cup.

== Management career ==
Since 1959, Wang successively served as the coach of Beijing football team, Beijing sport college team and Beijing youth team. He led the Beijing youth team won the China football league championship. He was named senior football coach in 1992.

== Death ==
On 7 February 2007, Wang died of liver cancer in Beijing, age 77.
