= Ligorio López =

Mexican footballer (1933-1993)

Personal information
- Full name: Antonio Ligorio López Altamirano
- Date of birth: 3 July 1933
- Place of birth: Mexico
- Date of death: 31 August 1993 (age 60)
- Position: Forward

Senior career*
Years	Team	Apps	(Gls)
- Irapuato FC

International career
1957–1958	Mexico	7	(2)
- * Club domestic league appearances and goals

Antonio Ligorio López Altamirano (3 July 1933 – 31 August 1993) was a Mexican professional football forward who played for Mexico in the 1958 FIFA World Cup. He also played for Irapuato FC.
