= Johny Halsdorf =

Luxembourgish footballer

Personal information
- Date of birth: 24 July 1934 (age 92)

International career
| Years | Team | Apps | (Gls) |
| 1955–1959 | Luxembourg | 12 | (4) |

Johny Halsdorf (born 24 July 1934) is a Luxembourgish footballer. He played in twelve matches for the Luxembourg national football team from 1955 to 1959.
