= Crescencio Gutiérrez =

Mexican footballer (1933–2025)

Personal information
- Full name: Crescencio Gutiérrez Aldana
- Date of birth: 26 October 1933
- Place of birth: Guadalajara, Mexico
- Date of death: 21 July 2025 (aged 91)
- Place of death: Jalisco, Mexico
- Position: Forward

Senior career*
Years	Team	Apps	(Gls)
1950–1962	Guadalajara	?	(72)
1962–?	Morelia		
?	Atlas		

International career
1956–1961	Mexico	12	(6)
- * Club domestic league appearances and goals

Crescencio Gutiérrez Aldana (Spanish: [kɾeˈsensjo ɣuˈtjeres alˈðana]; 26 October 1933 – 21 July 2025) was a Mexican professional footballer who played as a forward.

== Career ==
Gutiérrez, nicknamed "Mellone", due to his similarity both physically and in his style of play to Paraguayan striker Atilio Mellone, made his professional debut in 1950 at the age of 17 with Guadalajara. During his career at Guadalajara, he was part of the Campeonísimo, winning five Primera División titles (1956–57, 1958–59, 1959–60, 1960–61 and 1961–62). He led the league in goal-scoring during the 1956–57 season.

Gutiérrez later played for Morelia and Atlas.

He played for Mexico at the 1958 FIFA World Cup.

== Death ==
Gutiérrez died in July 2025, at the age of 91.
