= Eine, Belgium =

Eine
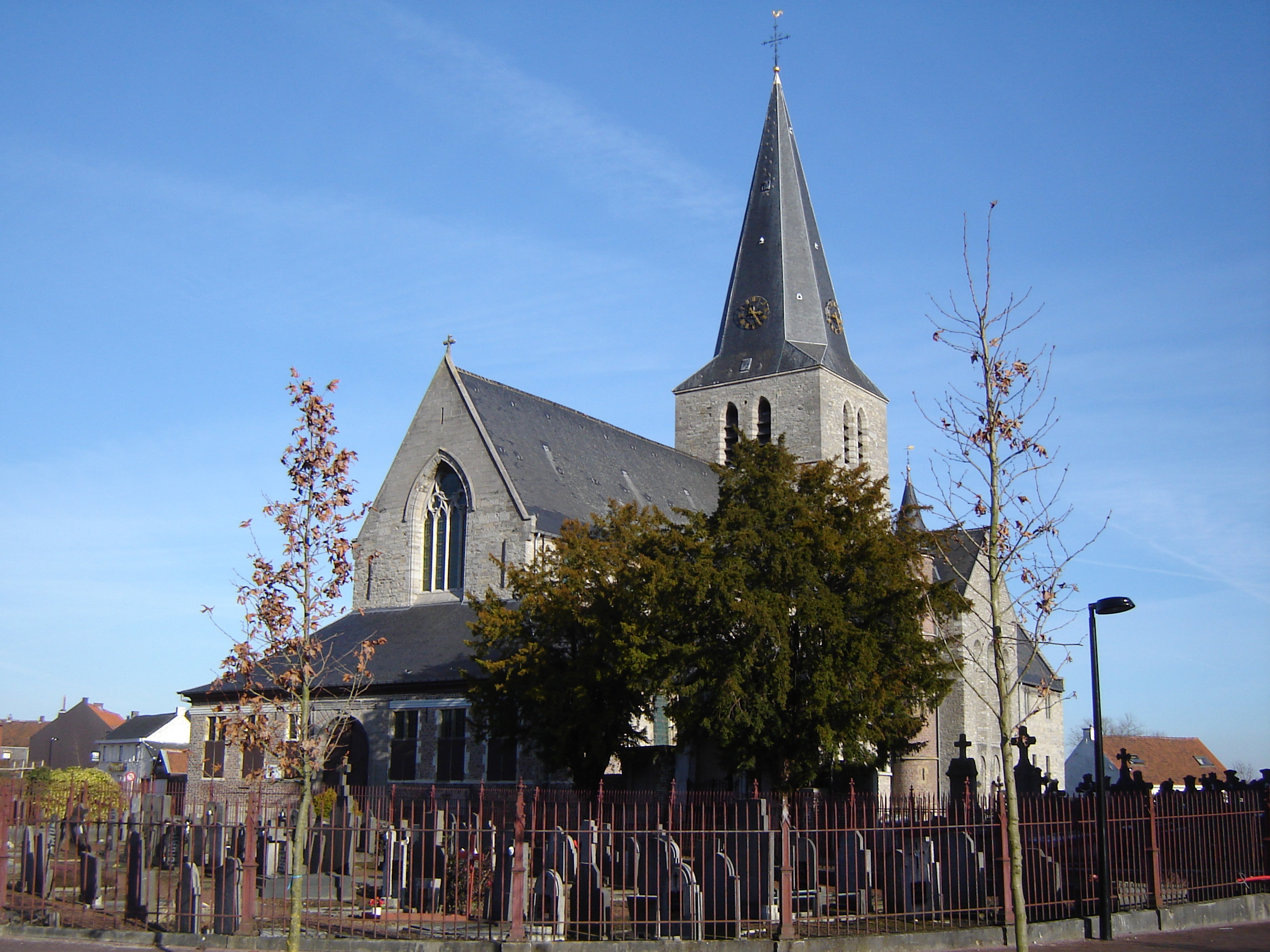
- Saint Eligius church, Eine (2009)

- Location within Belgium
- Coordinates: 50°52′N 3°37′E
- Country: Belgium
- Region: Flemish Region
- Province: East Flanders
- Arrondissement: Oudenaarde
- Municipality: Oudenaarde

Area
  - Total: 8.96 km^{2} (3.46 sq mi)

Population (2021)
  - Total: 5,165
  - Density: 576/km^{2} (1,490/sq mi)
- Postal code: 9700
- Area code: 055

Eine (Dutch pronunciation: [ˈɛinə]) is a village located in the province of East Flanders, Belgium. Since 1965, it has been a deelgemeente (subdivision) of the municipality of Oudenaarde.

== Overview ==
The village lies in the Flemish Ardennes, on the left bank of the Scheldt; the Marollebeek goes through the village. Eine borders Bevere to the centre of Oudenaarde. Saint Eligius is the patron saint of the village. Eine was part of the Diocese of Tournai in the 7th century.

Eine was originally a headland on the Scheldt. In the Middle Ages, it was transformed in an area shaped like an 8 and surrounded by a canal. A castle was built on the small circle and a church on the large circle which is still slightly visible. In 1708, the Battle of Oudenarde was partially fought in Eine. In 1857, the railway line from Oudenaarde to Ghent was built, and the village started to industrialise. Eine was severely damaged in 1918. During the 20th century, it started to become part of the urban area of Oudenaarde.

The central cemetery, the recycling center, and the water treatment plant of Oudenaarde are located in Eine. There is also a brewery, Brouwerij Cnudde.

== Gallery ==
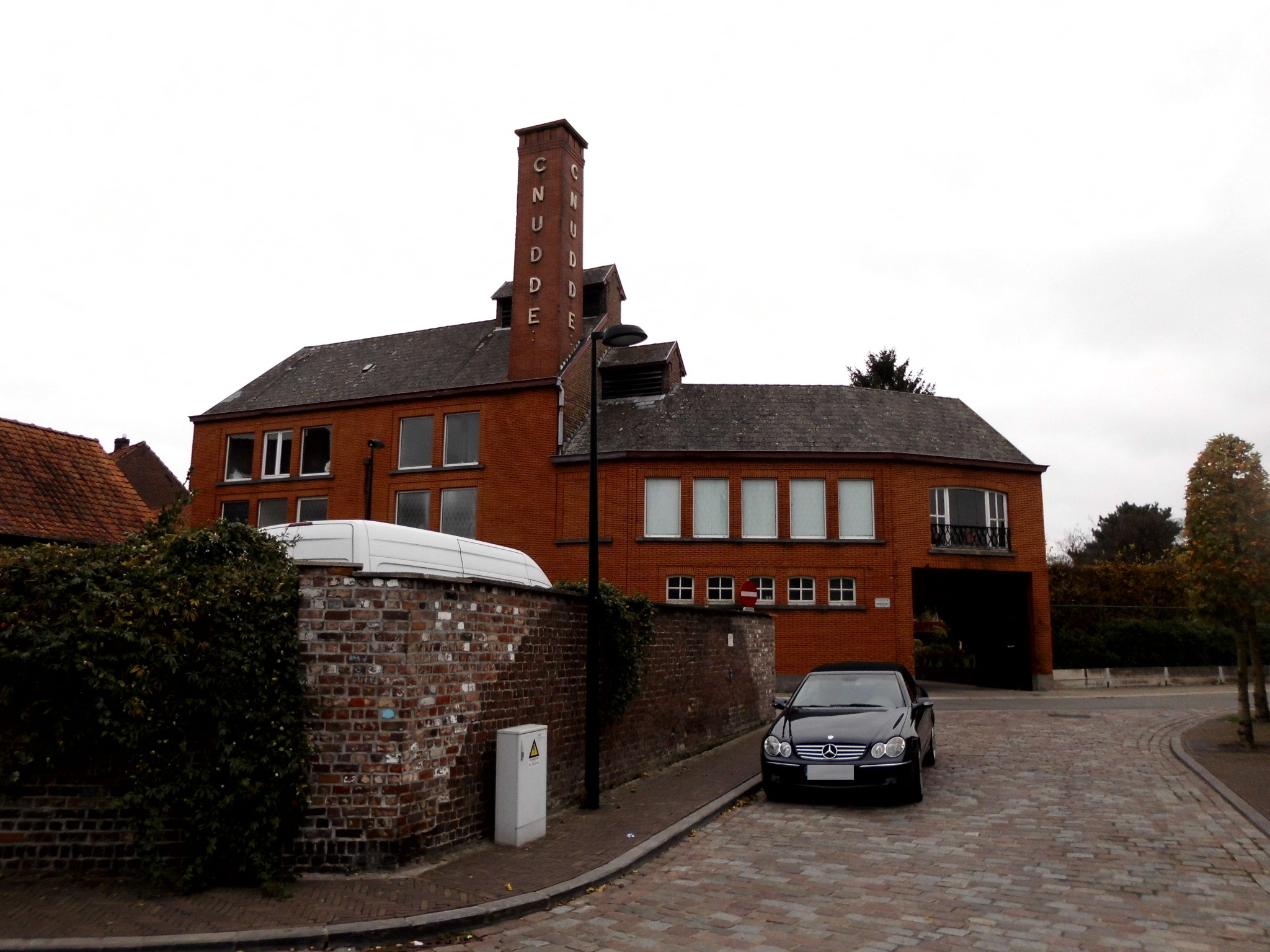
Cnudde brewery

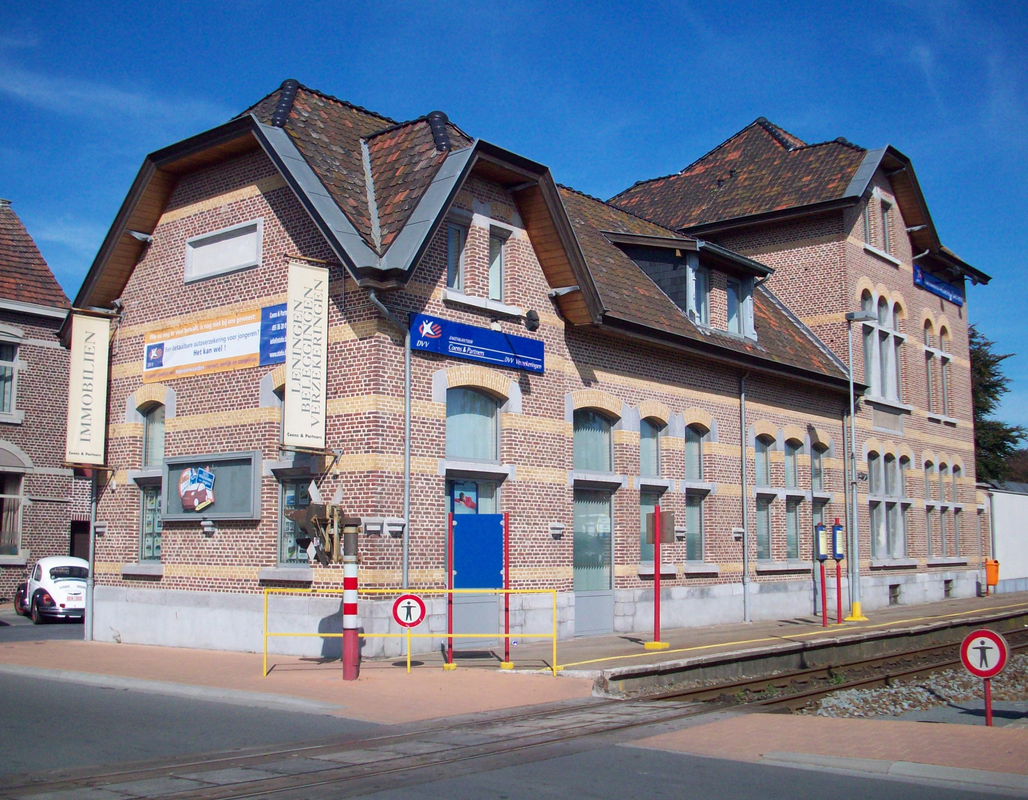
Eine railway station

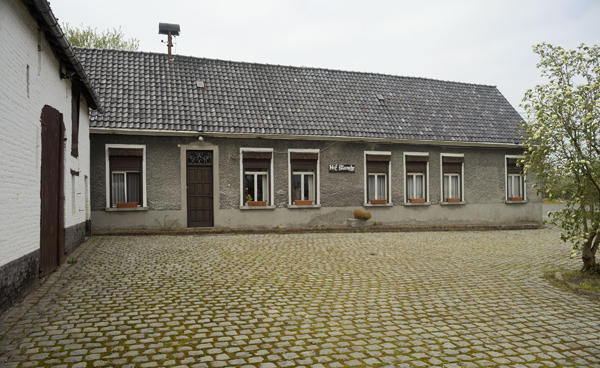
Building in Eine

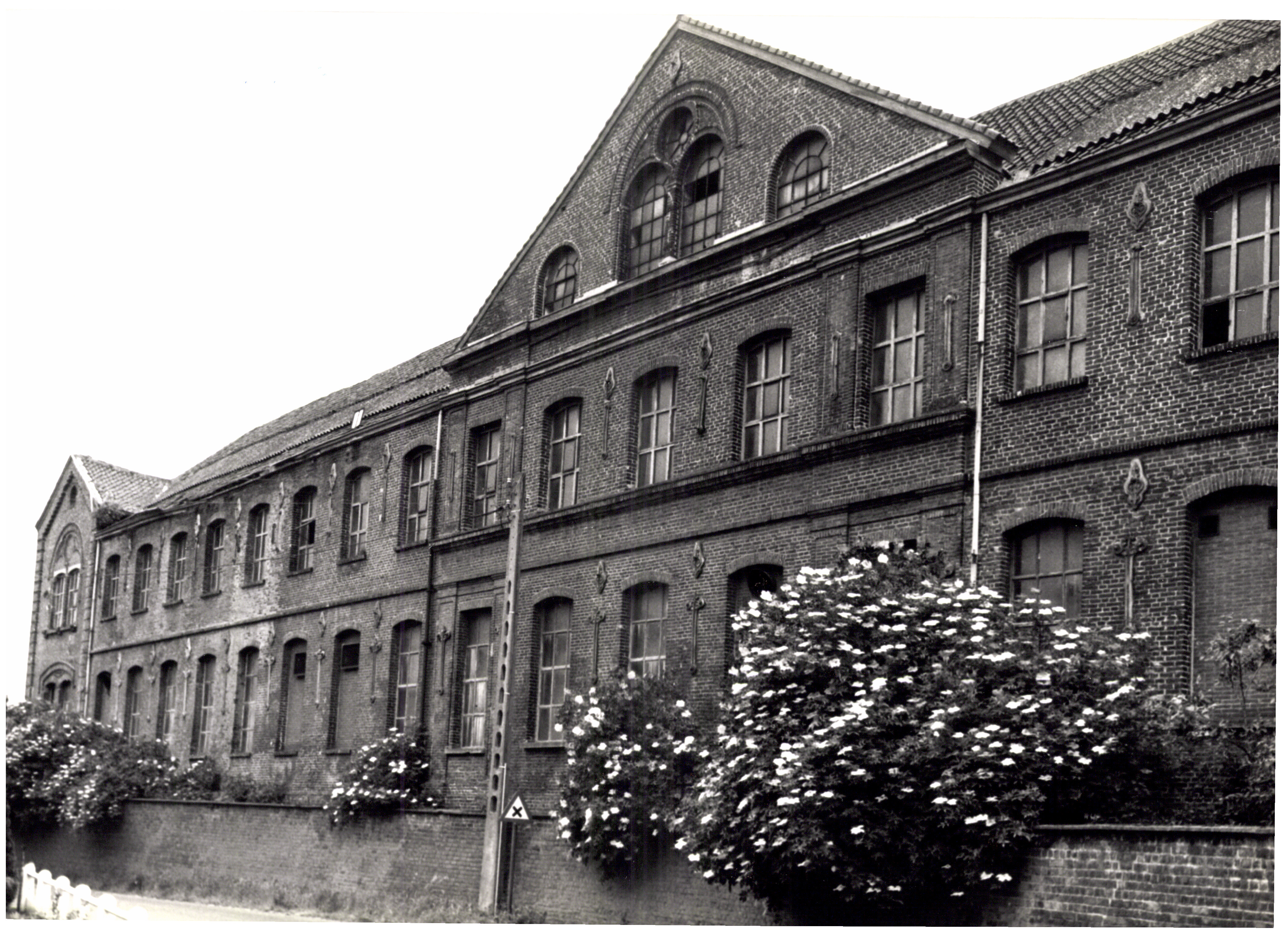
Flax spinning mill
