= 1958 FIFA World Cup qualification – UEFA Group 7 =

Football tournament

The three teams in this group played against each other on a home-and-away basis. The group winner Yugoslavia qualified for the 1958 FIFA World Cup held in Sweden.

== Table ==
Pos	Team	Pld	W	D	L	GF	GA	GR	Pts	Qualification	Yugoslavia national football team	Romania national football team	Greece national football team
1	Yugoslavia	4	2	2	0	7	2	3.500	6	Qualification to 1958 FIFA World Cup	—	2–0	4–1
2	Romania	4	2	1	1	6	4	1.500	5		1–1	—	3–0
3	Greece	4	0	1	3	2	9	0.222	1		0–0	1–2	—

Source: FIFA

== Matches ==
5 May 1957

Greece	0 – 0	Yugoslavia
	Report

Attendance: 30,000
Referee: Devillers (France)

16 June 1957

Greece	1 – 2	Romania
Panakis 29'	Report	A. Ene 15'; Ozon 78'

Attendance: 18,000
Referee: Harzic (France)

29 September 1957

Romania	1 – 1	Yugoslavia
A. Ene 78'	Report	Mujić 79'

Attendance: 110,000
Referee: Grill (Austria)

3 November 1957

Romania	3 – 0	Greece
Petschovsky 51' (pen.); Tătaru 64'; Cacoveanu 67'	Report

Attendance: 60,000
Referee: Schwinte (France)

10 November 1957

Yugoslavia	4 – 1	Greece
Mujić 6', 61'; Krstić 9'; Petaković 67'	Report	Nestoridis 28'

Attendance: 45,000
Referee: Jonni (Italy)

17 November 1957

Yugoslavia	2 – 0	Romania
Milutinović 52', 58'	Report

Attendance: 55,000
Referee: Seipelt (Austria)
