= James Murphy (soccer, born 1936) =

American soccer player (1936–2025)

23rd Sheriff of City of St. Louis Sheriff's Department
- In office November 08, 1988 – February 24, 2016
- Director of Public Safety: Charlene Deeken
- Mayor of St. Louis: Francis Slay
- Preceded by: Gordon D. Schweitzer
- Succeeded by: Vernon Betts

Personal details
- Born: James W. Murphy; July 2, 1936
- Died: March 15, 2025 (aged 88) St. Louis, Missouri

James W. Murphy (July 2, 1936 – March 17, 2025) was an American soccer player who was a member of the St. Louis Kutis in the mid-1950s. He earned two caps, scoring one goal, with the United States national team in 1957.

== Biography ==
Murphy was born on July 2, 1936. In 1957, Kutis won the National Challenge Cup. Consequently, the United States Soccer Federation replaced the U.S. national team with the Kutis club in the middle of the 1958 FIFA World Cup qualification campaign. Kutis, acting as the U.S. national team, lost two games to Canada and the U.S. had failed to qualify for a second straight Cup final. However, Murphy scored in 3–2 loss on July 6, 1957. He was inducted into the St. Louis Soccer Hall of Fame in 1989.

In 1989, he was elected Sheriff of St. Louis. On March 17, 2025, he died at the age of 88.
