= Toon Brusselers =

Dutch footballer

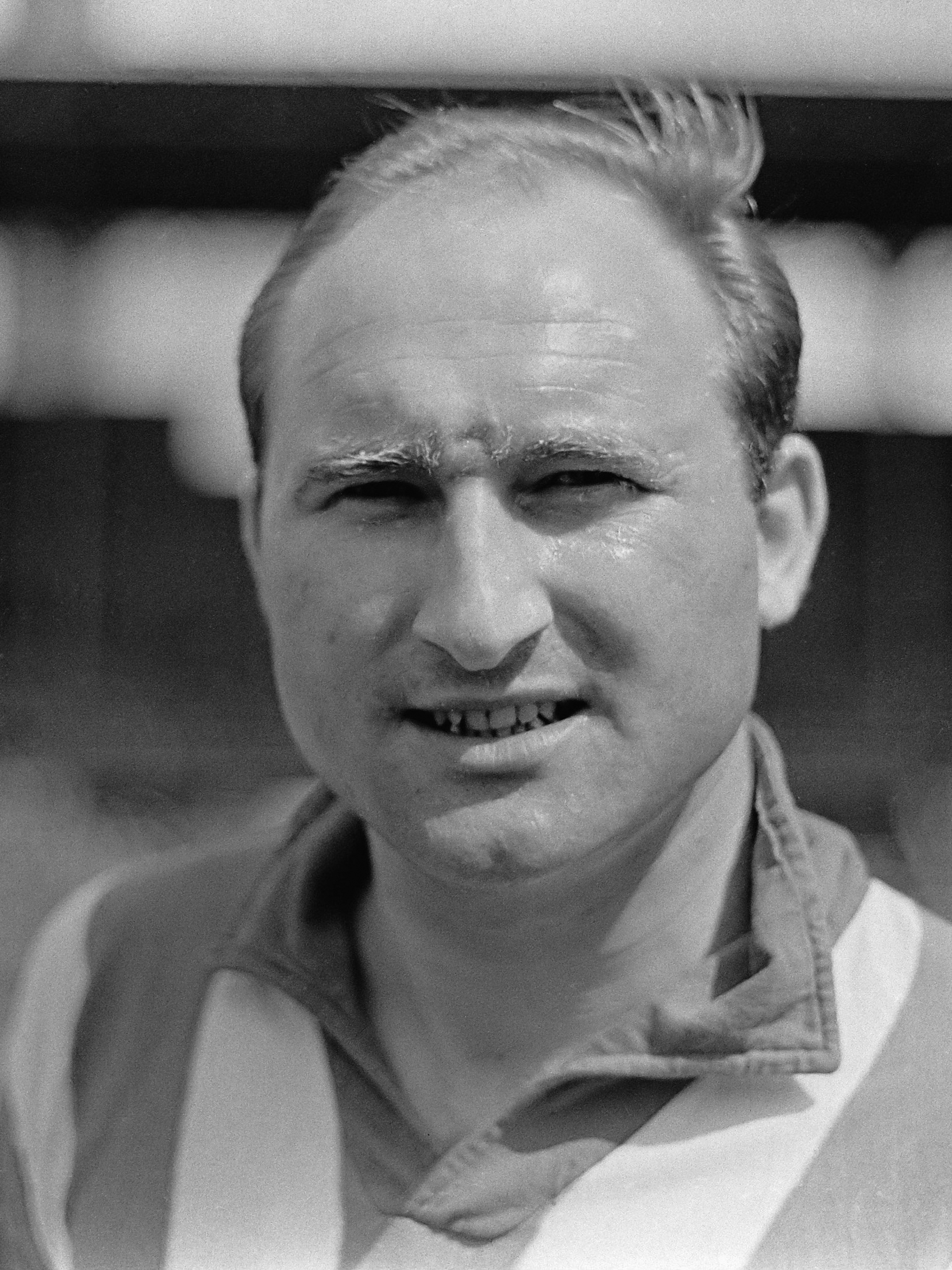
- Brusselers in 1961

Personal information
- Date of birth: 7 July 1933
- Place of birth: Leuven, Belgium
- Date of death: 20 May 2005 (aged 71)
- Position: Midfielder

Youth career
- 1950-1951: AGOVV

Senior career*
Years	Team	Apps	(Gls)
1956–1965	PSV	240	(47)
1965–1967	Den Bosch	48	(16)

International career
1955–1962	Netherlands	4	(2)
- * Club domestic league appearances and goals

Toon Brusselers (7 July 1933 – 20 May 2005) was a footballer. Born in Belgium, he played in four matches for the Netherlands national football team from 1955 to 1962. He was also named in Netherlands's squad for the qualification tournament for the 1958 FIFA World Cup.
