= Edgar Falch =

Norwegian footballer (1930-2013)

Personal information
- Full name: Edgar Falch
- Date of birth: 2 November 1930
- Place of birth: Stavanger, Norway
- Date of death: 18 November 2013 (aged 83)
- Position: Defender

Senior career*
Years	Team	Apps	(Gls)
1950–1961	Viking	139	(9)

International career
1954–1959	Norway	28	(1)
- * Club domestic league appearances and goals

Edgar Falch (2 November 1930 – 18 November 2013) was a Norwegian international football defender. Falch played for Viking his entire career where he played 139 league games and scored nine goals. He won the league with Viking in 1957–58 and the Cup in 1953 and 1959. Falch was capped 28 times for Norway.

Falch died in Stavanger in November 2013, aged 83. He was the grandfather of the goalkeeper Aslak Falch.
