= Paul Vandenberg =

Belgian footballer

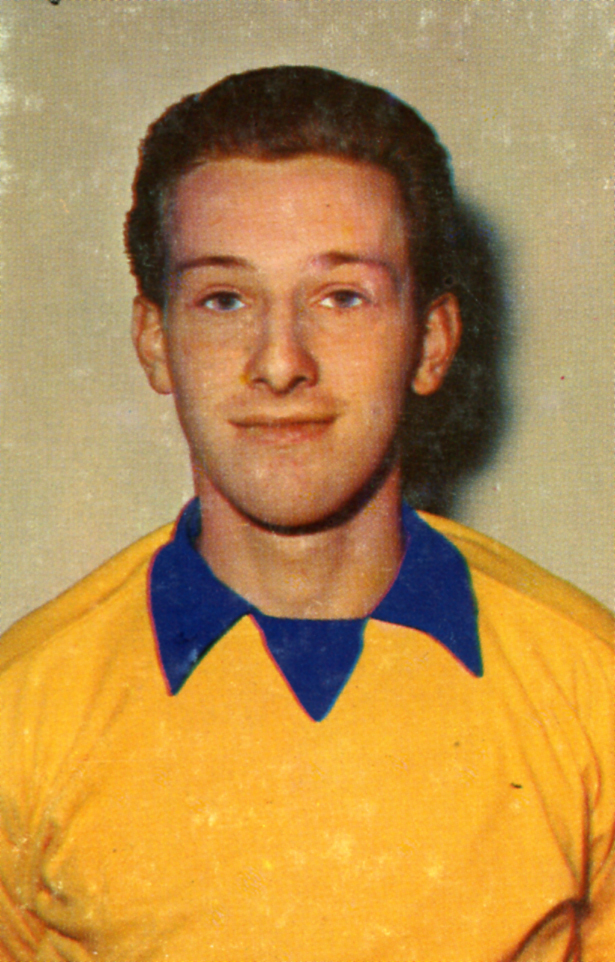

Personal information
- Full name: Paul Herman Marie Ghislain Vandenberg
- Date of birth: 11 October 1936 (age 90)
- Place of birth: Saint-Gilles, Belgium
- Position: Midfielder

Youth career
- R. Union Saint-Gilloise

Senior career*
Years	Team	Apps	(Gls)
1954–1965	R. Union Saint-Gilloise		
1965–1967	Standard de Liège	40	(5)
1967–1968	R.S.C. Anderlecht		
1968–1970	Crossing Club de Schaerbeek		

International career
1957–1967	Belgium	38	(16)
- * Club domestic league appearances and goals

Paul Herman Marie Ghislain Vandenberg (born 11 October 1936) is a former international Belgian footballer.
