= Ferenc Machos =

Hungarian footballer

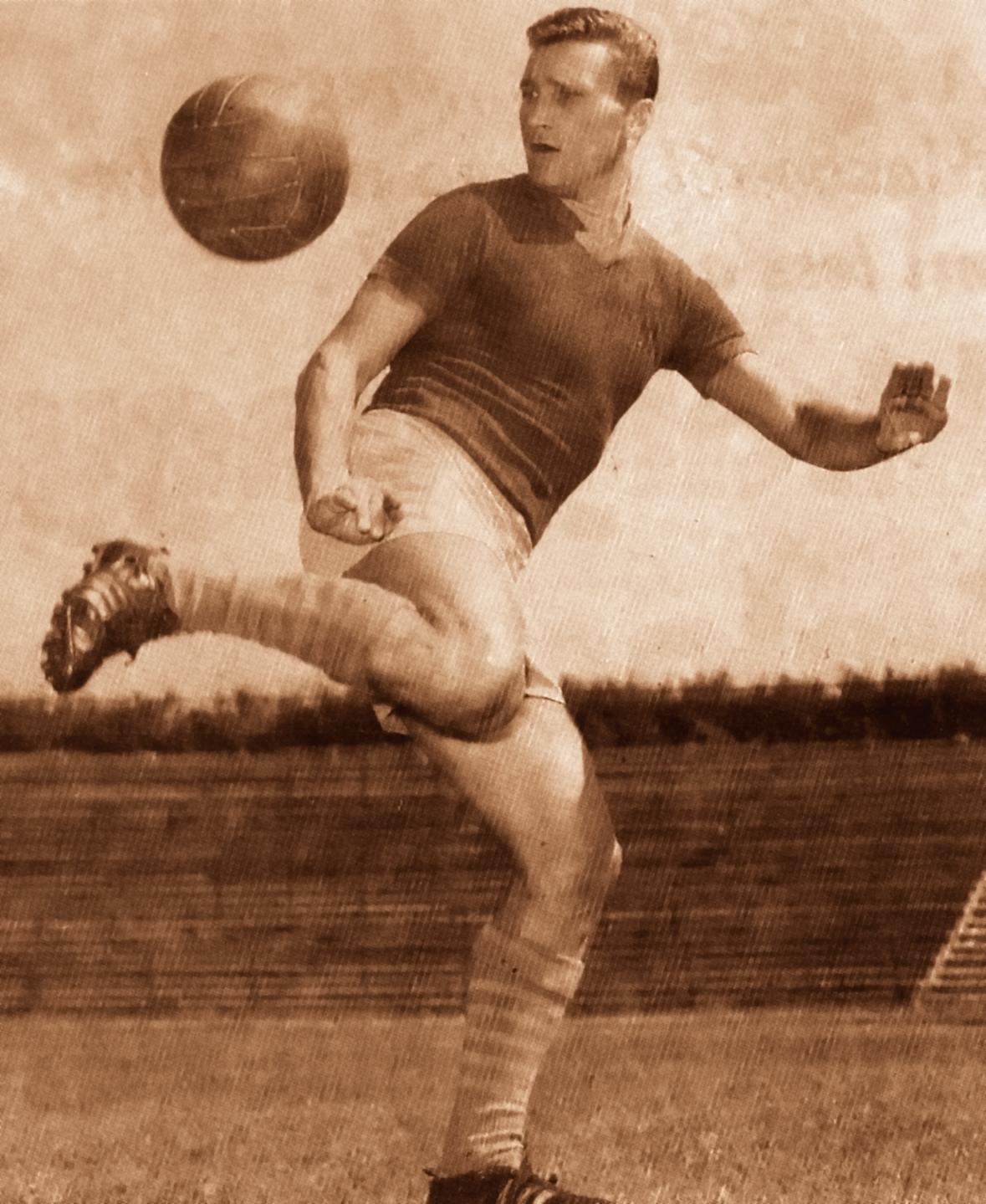
- Ferenc Machos during training at the Vasas field on Fáy Street.

Personal information
- Date of birth: 30 June 1932
- Place of birth: Tatabánya, Hungary
- Date of death: 3 December 2006 (aged 74)
- Place of death: Budapest, Hungary
- Position: Forward

Senior career*
Years	Team	Apps	(Gls)
1954–1959	Budapest Honvéd FC	95	(59)
1960–1965	Vasas SC	105	(59)
Total		200	(118)

International career
1954–1963	Hungary	29	(14)

Managerial career
- 1970–1972: Vasas SC
Medal record
Representing Hungary
FIFA World Cup
Runner-up	1954 Switzerland
- * Club domestic league appearances and goals

Ferenc Machos (30 June 1932 – 3 December 2006) was a Hungarian football forward who played for Hungary in the 1954 FIFA World Cup. He also played for Budapest Honvéd FC.
