= Denmark national football team results (1950–1959) =

This is a list of Association football games played by the Denmark national football team between 1950 and 1959. During the 1950s, the Danish national team played 72 games, winning 25, drawing 14, and losing 33. In these games, they scored 138 goals, while conceding 163 to their opponents. The first game of the 1950s was the May 28, 1950, game against Yugoslavia, the 162nd overall Danish national team game. The last game of the 1950s was the December 6, 1959, game against Bulgaria, the 233rd game of the Danish national team.

== Key ==
- ENQ - European Nations Cup Qualifying match
- F – Friendly match
- NC - Nordic Football Championship match
- OG - Olympic Games match
- OGQ - Olympic Games Qualifying match
- OT - Other tournament(s)
- WCQ – World Cup Qualifying match

== Games ==
Note that scores are written Denmark first

| # | Date | Venue | Opponents | Score | Comp | Denmark scorers |
|---|---|---|---|---|---|---|
| 162 | 1950-05-28 | JNA Stadium, Belgrade (A) | Yugoslavia | 1-5 | F | Axel Pilmark |
| 163 | 1950-06-22 | Idrætsparken, Copenhagen (H) | Norway | 4-0 | NC | Poul Erik "Popper" Petersen, Edwin Hansen, Jens Peter Hansen, Aage Rou Jensen |
| 164 | 1950-06-25 | Aarhus Stadion, Aarhus (H) | Norway | 1-4 | NC | Aage Rou Jensen |
| 165 | 1950-08-27 | Olympic Stadium, Helsinki (A) | Finland | 2-1 | NC | Poul Erik "Popper" Petersen, Holger Seebach |
| 166 | 1950-09-10 | Idrætsparken, Copenhagen (H) | Yugoslavia | 1-4 | F | Edwin Hansen |
| 167 | 1950-10-15 | Råsunda Stadium, Stockholm (A) | Sweden | 0-4 | NC | |
| 168 | 1950-11-05 | Prater Stadium, Vienna (A) | Austria | 1-5 | F | Erik Kuld Jensen |
| 169 | 1951-05-12 | Hampden Park, Glasgow (A) | Scotland | 1-3 | F | Jørgen W. Hansen |
| 170 | 1951-06-17 | Idrætsparken, Copenhagen (H) | Austria | 3-3 | F | Aage Rou Jensen (2), Knud Lundberg |
| 171 | 1951-09-16 | Ullevaal Stadion, Oslo (A) | Norway | 0-2 | NC | |
| 172 | 1951-09-30 | Idrætsparken, Copenhagen (H) | Finland | 1-0 | NC | Hilmar Staalgaard |
| 173 | 1951-10-21 | Idrætsparken, Copenhagen (H) | Sweden | 3-1 | NC | Poul "Rassi" Rasmussen, Knud Lundberg, Hilmar Staalgaard |
| 174 | 1952-05-25 | Idrætsparken, Copenhagen (H) | Scotland | 1-2 | F | Poul "Rassi" Rasmussen |
| 175 | 1952-06-11 | Bislett Stadium, Oslo (N) | Sweden | 0-2 | OT | |
| 176 | 1952-06-22 | Råsunda Stadium, Stockholm (A) | Sweden | 3-4 | NC | Poul "Rassi" Rasmussen, Poul Erik "Popper" Petersen, Holger Seebach |
| 177 | 1952-07-15 | Tammela Stadion, Tampere (N) | Greece | 2-1 | OG | Poul Erik "Popper" Petersen, Holger Seebach |
| 178 | 1952-07-21 | Kupittaa Stadion, Turku (N) | Poland | 2-0 | OG | Holger Seebach, Svend "Boston" Nielsen |
| 179 | 1952-07-25 | Pallokenttä, Helsinki (N) | Yugoslavia | 3-5 | OG | Knud Lundberg, Holger Seebach, Jens Peter Hansen |
| 180 | 1952-09-21 | Idrætsparken, Copenhagen (H) | Netherlands | 3-2 | F | Kurt "Nikkelaj" Nielsen, Poul Erik "Popper" Petersen |
| 181 | 1952-10-05 | Olympic Stadium, Helsinki (A) | Finland | 1-2 | NC | Per Jensen |
| 182 | 1952-10-19 | Idrætsparken, Copenhagen (H) | Norway | 1-3 | NC | Per Jensen |
| 183 | 1953-06-21 | Idrætsparken, Copenhagen (H) | Sweden | 1-3 | NC | Holger Seebach |
| 184 | 1953-06-27 | St. Jakob-Park, Basel (A) | Switzerland | 4-1 | F | Knud Ove Sørensen, Aage Rou Jensen (2), Jens Peter Hansen |
| 185 | 1953-08-09 | Idrætsparken, Copenhagen (H) | Iceland | 4-0 | F | Holger Seebach (2), Erik Nielsen, Erik Hansen |
| 186 | 1953-09-13 | Ullevaal Stadion, Oslo (A) | Norway | 1-0 | NC | Bent Sørensen |
| 187 | 1953-10-04 | Idrætsparken, Copenhagen (H) | Finland | 6-1 | NC | Jens Peter Hansen (2), Poul Erik "Popper" Petersen, Bent Sørensen, Kurt "Nikkelaj" Nielsen (2) |
| 188 | 1954-06-04 | Malmö Idrottsplats, Malmö (N) | Norway | 1-2 (aet) | OT | Valdemar Kendzior |
| 189 | 1954-06-13 | Olympic Stadium, Helsinki (A) | Finland | 2-2 | NC | Valdemar Kendzior (2) |
| 190 | 1954-09-19 | Idrætsparken, Copenhagen (H) | Switzerland | 1-1 | F | Jørgen Olesen |
| 191 | 1954-10-10 | Råsunda Stadium, Stockholm (A) | Sweden | 2-5 | NC | Jens Peter Hansen, Bent Sørensen |
| 192 | 1954-10-31 | Idrætsparken, Copenhagen (H) | Norway | 0-1 | NC | |
| 193 | 1955-03-13 | Olympic Stadium, Amsterdam (A) | Netherlands | 1-1 | F | Vagn Birkeland |
| 194 | 1955-05-15 | Idrætsparken, Copenhagen (H) | Hungary | 0-6 | F | |
| 195 | 1955-06-19 | Idrætsparken, Copenhagen (H) | Finland | 2-1 | NC | Jens Peter Hansen (2) |
| 196 | 1955-06-03 | Melavollur, Reykjavík (A) | Iceland | 4-0 | F | Aage Rou Jensen, Jens Peter Hansen, Poul Pedersen (2) |
| 197 | 1955-09-11 | Ullevaal Stadion, Oslo (A) | Norway | 1-1 | NC | Jørgen Jacobsen |
| 198 | 1955-10-02 | Idrætsparken, Copenhagen (H) | England | 1-5 | NC | Knud Lundberg |
| 199 | 1955-10-16 | Idrætsparken, Copenhagen (H) | Sweden | 3-3 | NC | Ove Andersen (2), Knud Lundberg |
| 200 | 1956-05-23 | Dynamo Stadium, Moscow (A) | USSR | 1-5 | F | Knud Lundberg |
| 201 | 1956-06-24 | Idrætsparken, Copenhagen (H) | Norway | 2-3 | NC | Knud Lundberg, Poul Pedersen |
| 202 | 1956-07-01 | Idrætsparken, Copenhagen (H) | USSR | 2-5 | F | Ove Andersen, Aage Rou Jensen |
| 203 | 1956-09-16 | Olympic Stadium, Helsinki (A) | Finland | 4-0 | NC | Poul Pedersen, Jørgen Hansen, Ove Andersen (2) |
| 204 | 1956-10-03 | Dalymount Park, Dublin (A) | Republic of Ireland | 1-2 | WCQ | Aage Rou Jensen |
| 205 | 1956-10-21 | Råsunda Stadium, Stockholm (A) | Sweden | 1-1 | NC | Jens Peter Hansen |
| 206 | 1956-11-04 | Idrætsparken, Copenhagen (H) | Netherlands | 2-2 | F | Jørgen Olesen, Knud Lundberg |
| 207 | 1956-12-05 | Molineux, Wolverhampton (A) | England | 2-5 | WCQ | Ove Bech Nielsen (2) |
| 208 | 1957-05-15 | Idrætsparken, Copenhagen (H) | England | 1-4 | WCQ | John Jensen |
| 209 | 1957-05-26 | Idrætsparken, Copenhagen (H) | Bulgaria | 1-1 | F | Aage Rou Jensen |
| 210 | 1957-06-18 | Olympic Stadium, Helsinki (A) | Finland | 0-2 | OT | |
| 211 | 1957-06-19 | Tammela Stadion, Tampere (N) | Norway | 2-0 | OT | Egon Jensen, Jørgen Hansen |
| 212 | 1957-06-30 | Idrætsparken, Copenhagen (H) | Sweden | 1-2 | NC | Jens Peter Hansen |
| 213 | 1957-07-10 | Laugardalsvöllur, Reykjavík (A) | Iceland | 6-2 | OT | Egon Jensen (3), Poul Pedersen, Jens Peter Hansen (2) |
| 214 | 1957-09-22 | Ullevaal Stadion, Oslo (A) | Norway | 2-2 | NC | Poul Pedersen, Peder Kjær |
| 215 | 1957-10-02 | Idrætsparken, Copenhagen (H) | Republic of Ireland | 0-2 | WCQ | |
| 216 | 1957-10-13 | Idrætsparken, Copenhagen (H) | Finland | 3-0 | NC | Finn Alfred Hansen, Ove Bech Nielsen, Mogens Machon |
| 217 | 1958-05-15 | Aarhus Stadion, Aarhus (H) | Curaçao | 3-2 | F | Poul Pedersen, Henning Enoksen (2) |
| 218 | 1958-05-25 | Idrætsparken, Copenhagen (H) | Poland | 3-2 | F | Jørn Sørensen, Poul Pedersen (2) |
| 219 | 1958-06-29 | Idrætsparken, Copenhagen (H) | Norway | 1-2 | NC | Poul Pedersen |
| 220 | 1958-09-14 | Olympic Stadium, Helsinki (A) | Finland | 4-1 | NC | Poul Pedersen, Mogens Machon, John Danielsen (2) |
| 221 | 1958-09-24 | Idrætsparken, Copenhagen (H) | West Germany | 1-1 | F | Henning Enoksen |
| 222 | 1958-10-15 | Idrætsparken, Copenhagen (H) | Netherlands | 1-5 | F | Henning Enoksen |
| 223 | 1958-10-26 | Råsunda Stadium, Stockholm (A) | Sweden | 4-4 | NC | Ole Madsen (2), Henning Enoksen, Jørn Sørensen |
| 224 | 1959-06-21 | Idrætsparken, Copenhagen (H) | Sweden | 0-6 | NC | |
| 225 | 1959-06-26 | Laugardalsvöllur, Reykjavík (A) | Iceland | 4-2 | OGQ | Jens Peter Hansen (2), Ole Madsen (2) |
| 226 | 1959-07-02 | Idrætsparken, Copenhagen (H) | Norway | 2-1 | OGQ | Henning Enoksen, Ole Madsen |
| 227 | 1959-08-18 | Idrætsparken, Copenhagen (H) | Iceland | 1-1 | OGQ | Henning Enoksen |
| 228 | 1959-09-13 | Ullevaal Stadion, Oslo (A) | Norway | 4-2 | OGQ; NC | Harald Nielsen, Henning Enoksen (2), Poul Pedersen |
| 229 | 1959-09-23 | Idrætsparken, Copenhagen (H) | Czechoslovakia | 2-2 | ENQ | Poul Pedersen, Bent Hansen |
| 230 | 1959-10-04 | Idrætsparken, Copenhagen (H) | Finland | 4-0 | NC | Harald Nielsen (3), John Kramer |
| 231 | 1959-10-18 | Stadion Za Lužánkami, Brno (A) | Czechoslovakia | 1-5 | ENQ | John Kramer |
| 232 | 1959-12-02 | Olympic Stadium, Athens (A) | Greece | 3-1 | F | Henning Enoksen (2), Poul Pedersen |
| 233 | 1959-12-06 | Vasil Levski National Stadium, Sofia (A) | Bulgaria | 1-2 | F | Henning Enoksen |

== See also ==
- List of Denmark national football team results
- Denmark national football team statistics

== Sources ==
- Landsholdsdatabasen at Danish Football Association
- A-LANDSKAMPE - 1950 - 1959 at Haslund.info
