= Denmark national football team records and statistics =

The Denmark national football team statistics show the accomplishments of the players and coaches of the Danish men's ever since the controlling organ of the team, the Danish Football Association (DBU), started registering official games at the 1908 Summer Olympics.

== Key ==
**Bold**	Currently available for selection. Correct as of 7 June 2026.
Pos	Positions
GK	Goalkeeper
DF	Defender
MF	Midfielder
FW	Forward

== Most appearances ==
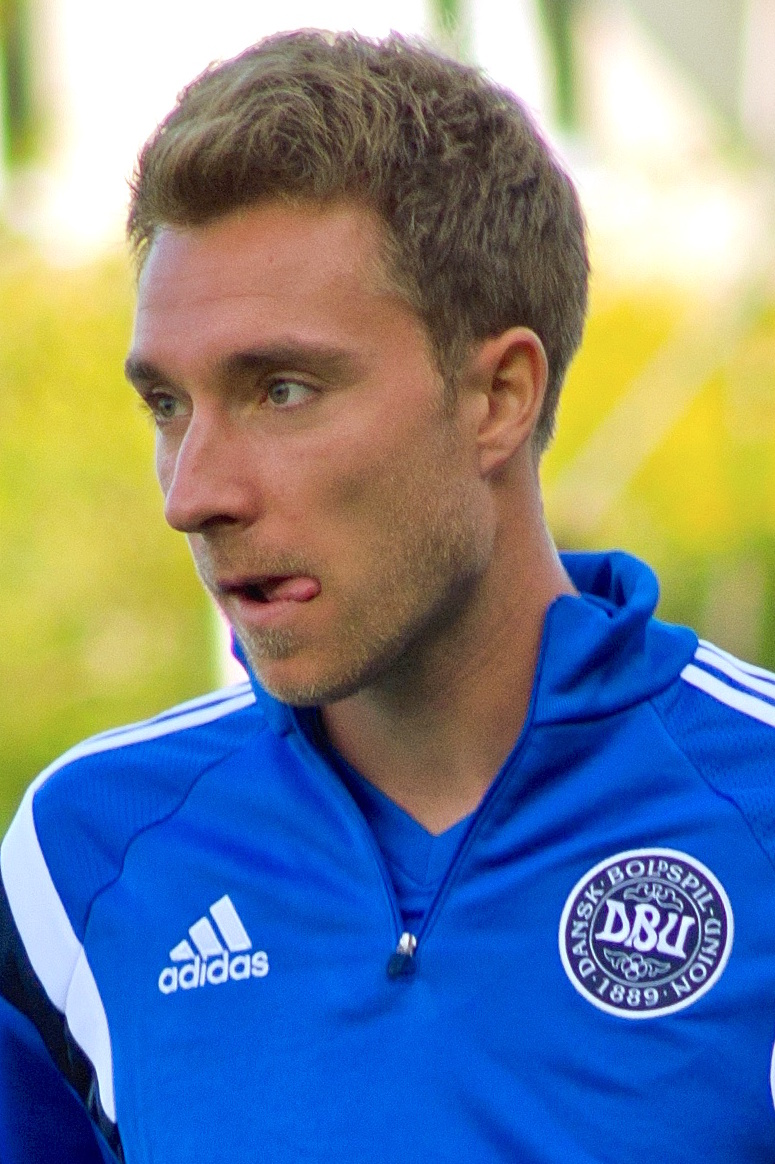
Midfielder Christian Eriksen has made the most appearances for the national team with 151 caps since his debut in 2010.

As of match played 14 November 2026

Rank	Player	Career	Caps	Goals
1	**Christian Eriksen**	2010–present	151	46
2	Simon Kjær	2009–2024	132	5
3	Peter Schmeichel*	1987–2001	129	1
4	Dennis Rommedahl	2000–2013	126	21
5	Kasper Schmeichel	2013–2025	120	0
6	Jon Dahl Tomasson	1997–2010	112	52
7	Thomas Helveg	1994–2007	108	2
8	Michael Laudrup	1982–1998	104	37
9	**Pierre-Emile Højbjerg**	2014–present	103	13
10	Martin Jørgensen	1998–2011	102	12
10	Morten Olsen	1970–1989	102	4
12	Thomas Sørensen	1997–2012	101	0
13	Christian Poulsen	2001–2012	92	6
14	John Sivebæk*	1982–1992	87	1
15	Jan Heintze	1987–2002	86	4
15	Yussuf Poulsen	2014–2024	86	14
17	Lars Olsen*	1986–1996	84	4
18	Brian Laudrup*	1987–1998	82	21
19	Lars Jacobsen	2006–2015	81	1
19	Nicklas Bendtner	2006–2018	81	30
19	William Kvist	2007–2018	81	2
19	Thomas Delaney	2013–2024	81	8
19	**Andreas Christensen**	2015–present	81	4
24	Jesper Grønkjær	1999–2010	80	5
25	Kim Vilfort*	1983–1996	77	14

* denotes winners of the 1992 European Championship.

== Goalscorers ==
=== Top goalscorers ===
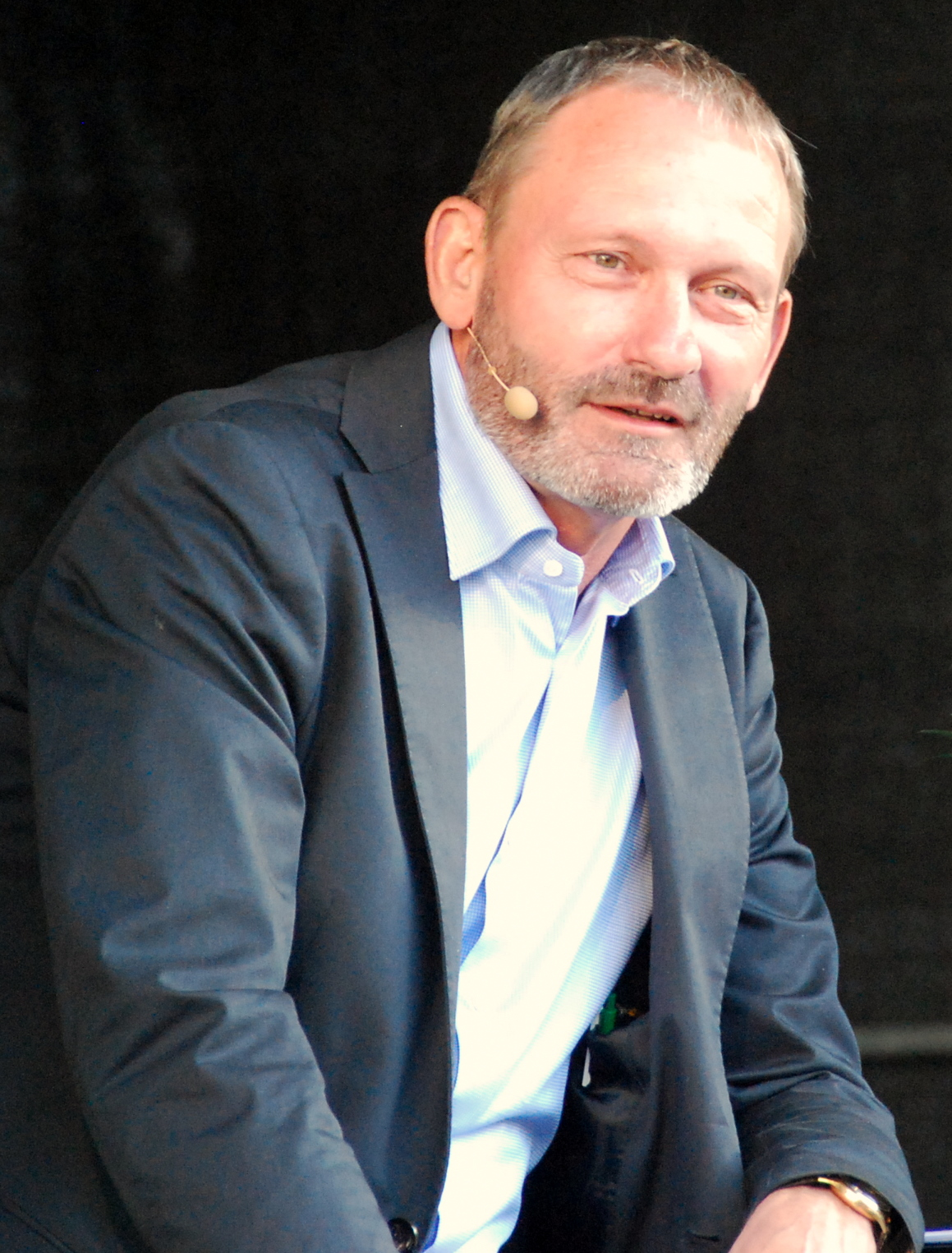
Forward Preben Elkjær averaged the most goals in the modern era, scoring at least one goal every other match.

As of match played 7 June 2026

This is a list of players with 10 goals or more for Denmark. With 52 goals each, Poul "Tist" Nielsen and Jon Dahl Tomasson currently share the Danish men's goalscoring record.

Rank	Player	Pos.	Career	Goals	Caps	Avg.
1	Poul "Tist" Nielsen (list)	FW	1910–1925	52	38	1.368
1	Jon Dahl Tomasson	FW	1997–2010	52	112	0.464
3	**Christian Eriksen**	MF	2010–present	46	151	0.305
4	Pauli Jørgensen	FW	1925–1939	44	47	0.936
5	Ole Madsen	FW	1958–1969	42	50	0.84
6	Preben Elkjær	FW	1977–1988	38	69	0.551
7	Michael Laudrup	MF	1982–1998	37	104	0.356
8	Nicklas Bendtner	FW	2006–2017	30	81	0.37
9	Henning Enoksen	FW	1958–1966	29	54	0.537
10	Michael Rohde	FW	1915–1931	22	40	0.55
10	Ebbe Sand	FW	1998–2004	22	66	0.333
12	Flemming Povlsen*	FW	1987–1994	21	62	0.339
12	Brian Laudrup*	FW	1987–1998	21	82	0.256
12	Dennis Rommedahl	FW	2000–2013	21	126	0.167
15	Allan Simonsen	FW	1972–1986	20	55	0.364
16	**Rasmus Højlund**	FW	2022–present	19	41	0.463
17	Jens Peter Hansen	FW	1949–1961	18	38	0.474
18	Karl Aage Hansen	FW	1943–1948	17	22	0.773
18	Karl Aage Præst	FW	1945–1949	17	24	0.708
18	Poul Pedersen	FW	1953–1964	17	50	0.34
21	Harald Nielsen	FW	1959–1960	15	14	1.071
21	Kaj Uldaler	FW	1927–1939	15	38	0.395
23	Frank Arnesen	MF	1977–1987	14	52	0.269
23	Kim Vilfort*	MF	1983–1996	14	77	0.182
23	Yussuf Poulsen	FW	2014–2024	14	86	0.163
26	Lars Elstrup*	FW	1988–1993	13	34	0.382
26	**Pierre-Emile Højbjerg**	MF	2014–present	13	103	0.126
28	Kaj Hansen	FW	1936–1946	12	27	0.444
28	**Kasper Dolberg**	FW	2016–present	12	56	0.214
28	**Joakim Mæhle**	DF	2020–present	12	65	0.185
28	Daniel Agger	DF	2005–2016	12	75	0.16
28	Martin Jørgensen	MF	1998–2011	12	102	0.118
33	Søren Larsen	FW	2005–2010	11	20	0.55
33	Aage Rou Jensen	FW	1945–1957	11	30	0.367
33	Kristen Nygaard	FW	1970–1979	11	36	0.306
33	Per Røntved	DF	1970–1982	11	75	0.147
37	Lars Bastrup	FW	1975–1983	10	30	0.333
37	Helmuth Søbirk	FW	1935–1945	10	30	0.333
37	Henry Hansen	FW	1922–1934	10	38	0.263
37	**Mikkel Damsgaard**	MF	2020-present	10	45	0.222
37	Knud Lundberg	FW	1943–1956	10	39	0.256
37	Søren Lerby	MF	1978–1989	10	67	0.149
37	**Martin Braithwaite**	FW	2013–present	10	69	0.145

* denotes winners of the 1992 European Championship.

=== Highest goal average ===
Only people with at least five goals have been included.

Rank	Player	Career	Goals/cap	Goals	Caps
1	Poul "Tist" Nielsen	1910–1925	1.37	52	38
2	Erik Dyreborg	1967	1.33	8	6
3	John Hansen	1948	1.25	10	8
4	Kaj Christiansen	1943–1948	1.20	6	5
4	Iver Schriver	1971	1.20	6	5
6	Harald Nielsen	1959–1960	1.07	15	14
7	Pauli Jørgensen	1925–1939	0.94	44	47
8	Anthon Olsen	1912–1927	0.88	14	16
9	Ole Madsen	1958–1969	0.84	42	50
10	Sophus "Krølben" Nielsen	1908–1919	0.80	16	20

== Team captains ==
As of 29 June 2024

The ten players with the most caps as Danish team captains are:

Rank	Player	Captain years	Caps (total)	Percentage
1	Lars Olsen*	1987–1994	69 (84)	82.1%
2	Simon Kjær	2016–2024	67 (132)	50.8%
3	Morten Olsen	1980–1989	50 (102)	49%
4	Per Røntved	1972–1982	38 (75)	50.7%
5	Jon Dahl Tomasson	2004–2010	36 (112)	32.1%
6	Daniel Agger	2010–2016	34 (75)	45.3%
7	Peter Schmeichel*	1996–2001	30 (129)	23.3%
8	Ole Madsen	1962–1969	28 (51)	54.9%
8	Michael Laudrup	1994–1998	28 (104)	25.7%
10	Knud Lundberg	1947–1956	27 (39)	69.2%

Players still playing or available for selection are in bold.

* denotes winners of the 1992 European Championship.

== Cards ==
As of 7 June 2026

=== Cautions ===
Rank	Player	Career	Caps	Cautions
1	Thomas Helveg	1994–2008	108	15
1	Thomas Gravesen	1998–2006	66	15
3	Preben Elkjær	1977–1988	69	12
3	**Pierre-Emile Højbjerg**	2014–present	103	12
3	**Joachim Andersen**	2019–present	57	12
6	Christian Poulsen	2001–2012	92	11
6	Simon Kjær	2009–2024	132	11
8	Stig Tøfting	1993–2002	41	10
9	John Jensen*	1986–1995	69	9
9	Søren Lerby	1978–1989	67	9
9	Peter Schmeichel*	1987–2001	129	9
9	Daniel Jensen	2002–2010	52	9
9	William Kvist	2007–2018	81	9

Players still playing or available for selection are in bold.

* denotes winners of the 1992 European Championship.

=== Sending-offs ===
Rank	Player	Career	Caps	Sending-offs
1	Morten Wieghorst	1994–2004	30	2
2	Ernst Nilsson	1920–1937	40	1
2	Torben Nielsen	1969–1972	26	1
2	Per Røntved	1970–1982	75	1
2	Frank Arnesen	1977–1987	52	1
2	Klaus Berggreen	1979–1988	46	1
2	Miklos Molnar	1990–2000	18	1
2	Per Frandsen	1990–2003	23	1
2	Thomas Gravesen	1998–2003	66	1
2	Niclas Jensen	1998–2008	62	1
2	Jesper Grønkjær	1999–2010	80	1
2	Christian Poulsen	2001–2012	92	1
2	**Rasmus Kristensen**	2021–present	34	1

Players still playing or available for selection are in bold.

* denotes winners of the 1992 European Championship.

== Managers ==
As of 4 October 2026

The management statistics are:

Note that the Denmark national football team has not had a designated team manager for every match.

Manager	Years	G	W	D	L	GF	GA	Win %
Charles Williams	1908–1910	4	3	0	1	28	4	75.00
Axel Andersen Byrval	1913–1915; 1917–1918	16	14	1	1	68	12	87.50
Jack Carr (caretaker)	1920	1	0	0	1	0	1	0.00
Edward Magner (caretaker)	1939	2	2	0	0	11	3	100.00
Sophus Nielsen (caretaker)	1940	2	0	2	0	4	4	0.00
J.D. Butler (caretaker)	1946	2	1	0	1	4	3	50.00
Axel Bjerregaard & Ove Bøje (caretakers)	1948	3	2	0	1	12	2	66.67
Robert Mountford (caretaker)	1948	4	3	0	1	15	11	75.00
Axel Bjerregaard (caretaker)	1952	3	2	0	1	7	6	66.67
Alf Young (caretaker)	1956	1	0	0	1	1	2	0.00
Lajos Szendrödi (caretaker)	1956	1	0	1	0	1	1	0.00
Arne Sørensen	1956–1961	41	20	8	13	94	78	48.78
Poul Petersen	1962–1966	47	17	8	22	85	94	36.17
Erik Hansen & Ernst Netuka (caretaker)	1967	8	4	2	2	29	11	50.00
Erik Hansen & Henry From (caretaker)	1968–1969	11	4	1	6	21	17	36.36
John Hansen & Henry From (caretaker)	1969	9	5	1	3	20	12	55.56
Rudi Strittich	1970–1975	61	20	11	30	80	102	32.79
Kurt Nielsen	1976–1979	31	13	6	12	55	45	41.94
Sepp Piontek	1979–1990	115	52	24	39	167	123	45.22
Richard Møller Nielsen	1987–1988; 1990–1996	73	40	18	15	116	55	54.79
Bo Johansson	1996–2000	40	17	9	14	51	43	42.50
Morten Olsen	2000–2015	166	80	42	44	258	178	48.19
Åge Hareide	2016–2020	42	21	18	3	81	26	50.00
John Jensen (caretaker) (Note: Caretaker manager for Denmark's replacement squad in a friendly match against Slovakia.)	2018	1	0	0	1	0	3	0.00
Kasper Hjulmand (Note: Ebbe Sand was caretaker on 11 November 2020, while Hjulmand was unable to perform duties. Sand was given credit for the match result.)	2020–2024	54	32	8	14	100	46	59.26
Ebbe Sand (interim)	2020	1	1	0	0	2	0	100.00
Lars Knudsen (caretaker)	2024	4	2	1	1	6	3	50.00
Brian Riemer (Note: Denmark was leading Ukraine 2–1 on 7 June 2026 before the match was abandoned in the 79th minute.)	2024–present	20	10	5	5	40	26	50.00
Managers total		**763**	**365**	**166**	**232**	**1,356**	**911**	**47.84**
no manager		169	73	25	71	366	331	43.20
Total		**932**	**438**	**191**	**303**	**1,722**	**1,242**	**47.00**

== Matches ==
As of 7 June 2026

Decade	Played	Won	Drawn	Lost	For	Against	Diff	%Won	%Drawn	%Lost	Average Points per match
1900s	3	2	0	1	26	3	+23	67%	0%	33%	2.00
1910s	30	23	1	6	108	33	+75	77%	3%	20%	2.33
1920s	40	17	9	14	75	61	+14	43%	23%	35%	1.50
1930s	46	21	5	20	119	99	+20	46%	11%	43%	1.48
1940s	42	21	7	14	105	76	+29	50%	17%	33%	1.67
1950s	72	25	14	33	138	163	−25	35%	19%	46%	1.24
1960s	91	40	13	38	195	160	+35	44%	14%	42%	1.46
1970s	97	35	19	43	140	152	−12	36%	20%	44%	1.28
1980s	115	56	22	37	187	119	+68	49%	19%	32%	1.65
1990s	102	52	27	23	140	83	+57	51%	26%	23%	1.79
2000s	109	54	30	25	171	98	+73	50%	28%	23%	1.76
2010s	106	46	30	30	167	113	+54	44%	28%	28%	1.58
2020s	75	43	14	18	143	67	+76	57%	19%	24%	1.91
**Total**	**928**	**436**	**191**	**301**	**1,724**	**1,241**	**+483**	**47%**	**21%**	**32%**	**1.62**

Note that average points per game is calculated by using 3 points for a win and 1 point for a draw.

== Footnotes ==
1. GF = Goals for
2. GA = Goals against
3. Richard Møller Nielsen coached 8 matches in the 1988 Summer Olympics qualification campaign, winning 6, drawing 1 and losing 1, with the combined score 25–3.
4. Last updated 30 June 2014.
5. In all 169 matches, played through 1911–12 (5 matches), 1916 (4), 1919–20 (6), 1920–38 (77), 1939 (4), 1940–45 (12), 1946–47 (10), 1948–52 (24), 1952–56 (24), 1957 (1), 1959 (1) and 1961 (1).
