= List of Denmark international footballers =

This list of Denmark international footballers contains football players who have played for the Denmark national football team, listed according to their number of caps. As more than 750 players have played for the team since it started officially registering its players in 1908, only players with 25 or more official caps are included. Goalkeeper Sophus Hansen was the first Dane to reach 25 caps, doing so on June 5, 1919. Since then, more than 120 Danish footballers have reached 25 caps for the Danish national team.

== Key ==
	Tournament medalists at the: 1908 OG – 1908 Olympic Games - (silver) Runners-up; 1912 OG – 1912 Olympic Games - (silver) Runners-up; 1948 OG – 1948 Olympic Games - (bronze) Third place; 1960 OG – 1960 Olympic Games - (silver) Runners-up; 1992 EC – 1992 European Championship - (gold) Winners; 1995 CC – 1995 Confederations Cup - (gold) Winners
**Bold**	Currently available for selection. Correct as of 1 October 2026.
Pos	Positions
GK	Goalkeeper
DF	Defender
MF	Midfielder
FW	Forward

== List of players ==
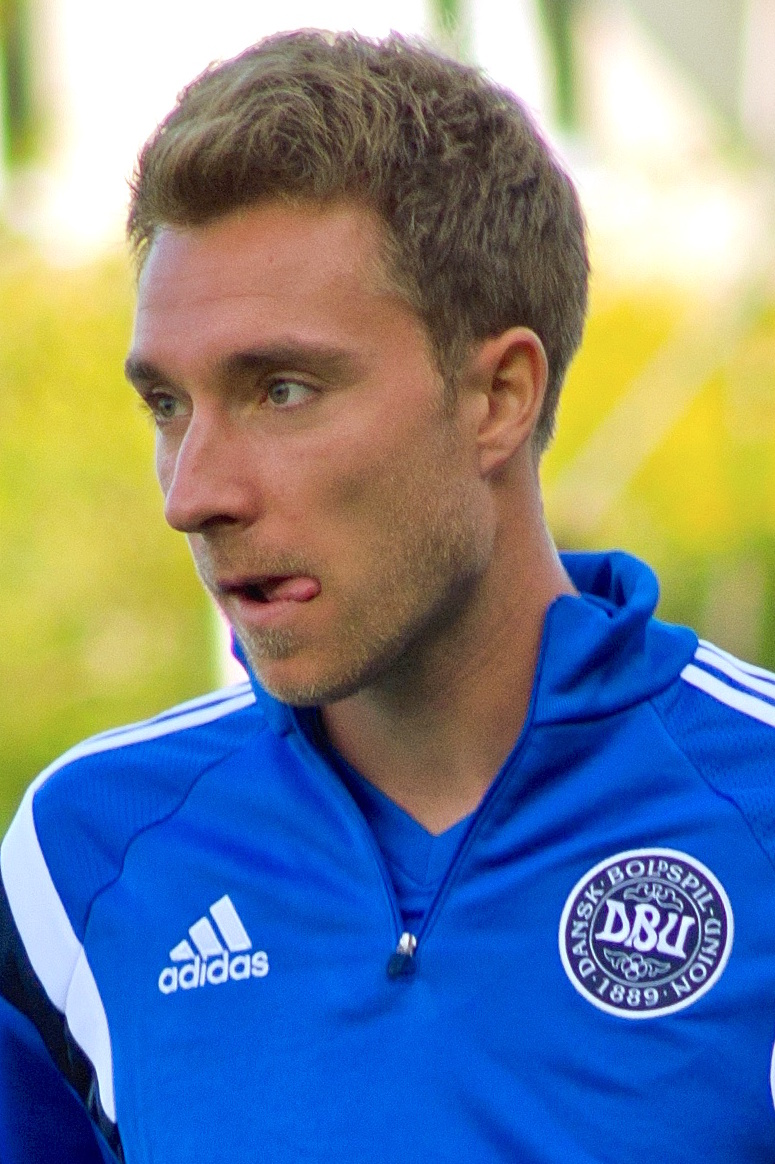
Midfielder Christian Eriksen is Denmark's most capped men's player with 151 appearances.

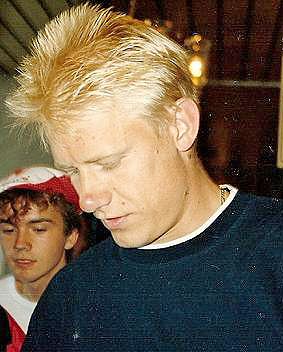
Goalkeeper Peter Schmeichel (129 caps) is the third most capped Danish men's footballer of all time, and the first Dane to reach 125 caps. He represented Denmark in four European Championships and the 1998 World Cup. He was on the 1992 European Championship winning team and was named World's Best Goalkeeper of the Year in 1992 and 1993.

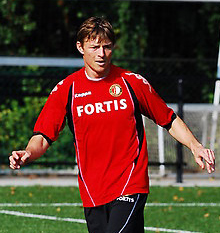
Forward Jon Dahl Tomasson (112 caps) is the top goalscorer for the Danish men's team with 52 goals (joint with Poul "Tist" Nielsen). He was the Danish top goalscorer at the 2002 World Cup and 2004 European Championship with a combined seven goals in eight games. He played in a total four international tournaments.

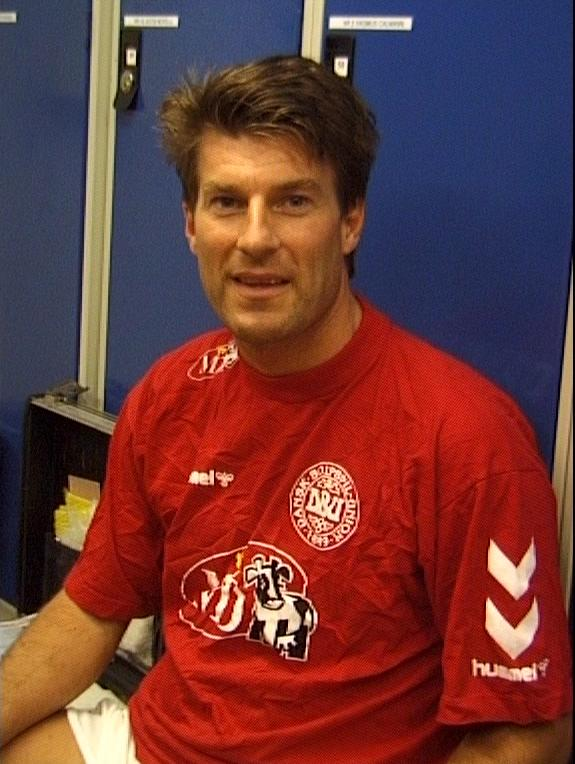
Midfielder Michael Laudrup (104 caps) is officially named the best Danish footballer of all time by the Danish Football Association. He represented Denmark in three European Championships, won the 1995 Confederations Cup, and was the first Dane to have played two World Cups. He started his national team career as a forward, but eventually settled as a midfielder.

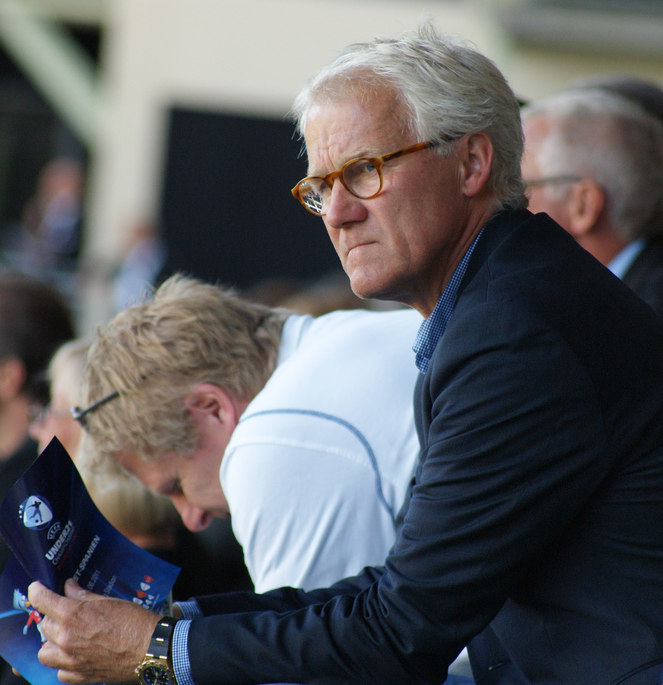
Defender Morten Olsen (102 caps) is the first Dane to reach 100 caps and set a record of 50 games as team captain. He represented Denmark at the 1986 World Cup and two European Championships. He later became national team manager and is the only person in football to reach 100 international caps as both player and manager.

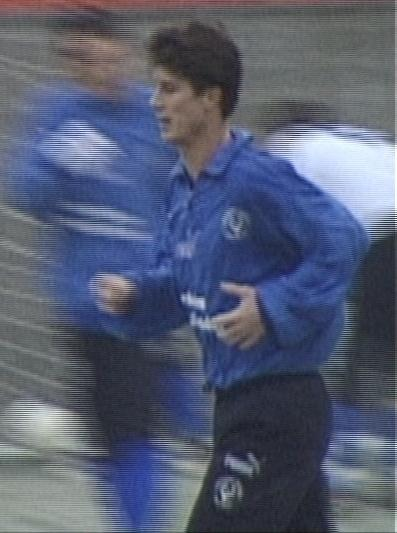
Forward Brian Laudrup (82 caps) was in the winning team at the 1992 European Championship and 1995 Confederations Cup. He was the Danish top goalscorer at the 1996 European Championship with three goals in three games and also played at the 1998 World Cup. He won a record four Danish Footballer of the Year awards.

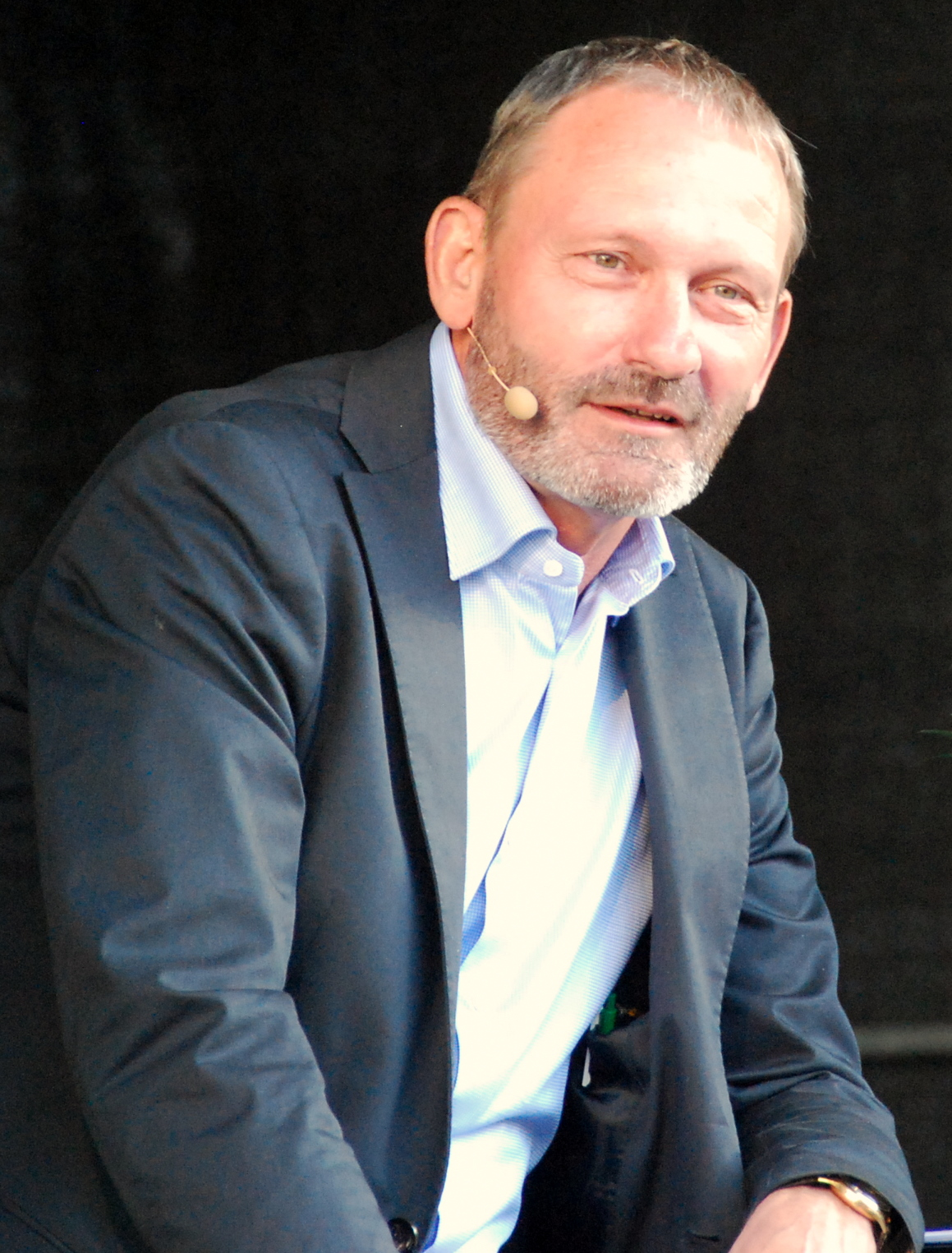
Forward Preben Elkjær (69 caps) was the Danish top goalscorer at the 1984 European Championship and 1986 World Cup with a combined six goals in eight games, and was named the third most outstanding player of that World Cup. He also represented Denmark at the 1988 European Championships.

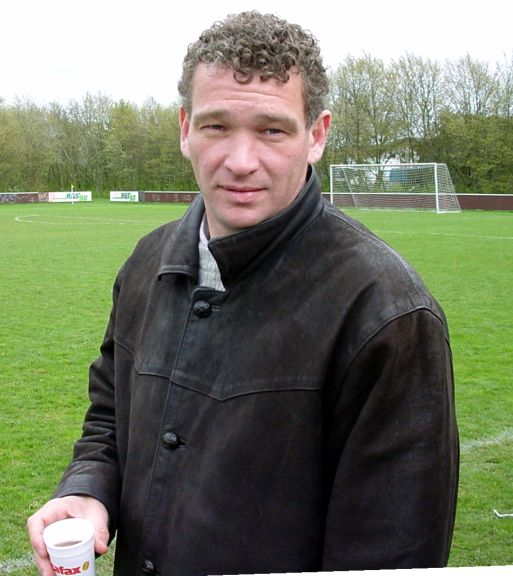
Midfielder John "Faxe" Jensen (69 caps) was part of the 1992 European Championship winning team, and scored the first goal in the final. He represented Denmark in three European Championships.

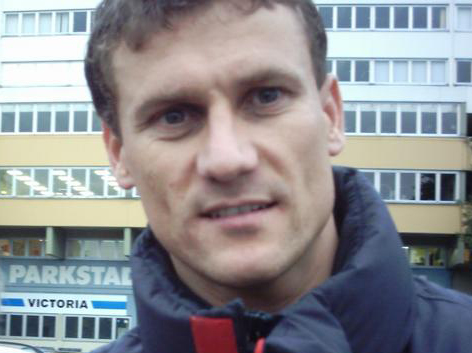
Forward Ebbe Sand (66 caps) scored the fastest World Cup goal by a substitute (16 seconds) at the 1998 World Cup. He represented Denmark in two World Cups and two European Championships.

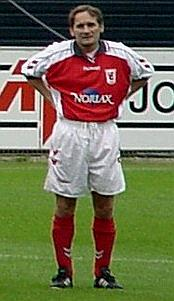
Forward Allan Simonsen (55 caps) is the first (and only) Dane to be named European Footballer of the Year. He played in all three major international tournaments; the 1972 Summer Olympics, 1984 European Championship and 1986 World Cup.

#	Name	Pos.	First cap	Last cap	Caps	Goals	Medals
1	**Christian Eriksen**	MF	2010	2026	151	46	
2	Simon Kjær	DF	2009	2024	132	5	
3	Peter Schmeichel	GK	1987	2001	129	1	1992 EC (gold)
4	Dennis Rommedahl	MF/FW	2000	2013	126	21	
5	Kasper Schmeichel	GK	2013	2025	120	0	
6	Jon Dahl Tomasson	FW	1997	2010	112	52	
7	Thomas Helveg	DF	1994	2007	108	2	
8	Michael Laudrup	MF/FW	1982	1998	104	37	1995 CC (gold)
9	Morten Olsen	DF	1970	1989	102	4	
9	Martin Jørgensen	MF	1998	2011	102	12	
11	Thomas Sørensen	GK	1999	2012	101	0	
12	**Pierre-Emile Højbjerg**	MF	2014	2026	100	11	
13	Christian Poulsen	MF	2001	2012	92	6	
14	John Sivebæk	DF	1982	1992	87	1	1992 EC (gold)
15	Jan Heintze	DF	1987	2002	86	4	
15	**Yussuf Poulsen**	FW	2014	2024	86	14	
17	Lars Olsen	DF	1986	1996	84	4	1992 EC (gold)
18	Brian Laudrup	FW	1987	1998	82	21	1992 EC (gold); 1995 CC (gold)
18	**Andreas Christensen**	DF	2015	2026	82	4	
20	Lars Jacobsen	DF	2006	2015	81	1	
20	Nicklas Bendtner	FW	2006	2018	81	30	
20	William Kvist	MF	2007	2018	81	2	
20	Thomas Delaney	MF	2013	2024	81	8	
24	Jesper Grønkjær	MF/FW	1999	2010	80	5	
25	Kim Vilfort	MF	1983	1996	77	14	1992 EC (gold)
26	Per Røntved	DF	1970	1982	75	11	
26	Daniel Agger	DF	2005	2016	75	12	
28	Jens Jørn Bertelsen	MF	1976	1987	69	2	
28	Preben Elkjær	FW	1977	1988	69	38	
28	John "Faxe" Jensen	MF	1986	1995	69	4	1992 EC (gold)
28	**Martin Braithwaite**	FW	2013	2023	69	10	
32	Søren Lerby	MF	1978	1989	67	10	
33	Brian Steen Nielsen	MF	1990	2002	66	3	1995 CC (gold)
33	René Henriksen	DF	1998	2004	66	0	
33	Ebbe Sand	FW	1998	2004	66	22	
33	Thomas Gravesen	MF	1998	2006	66	5	
37	Henning Munk Jensen	DF	1966	1978	62	1	
37	Flemming Povlsen	FW	1987	1994	62	21	1992 EC (gold)
37	Niclas Jensen	DF	1998	2008	62	0	
37	**Joakim Mæhle**	DF	2020	2026	62	11	
41	Søren Busk	DF	1979	1988	61	2	
41	Marc Rieper	DF	1990	1998	61	2	1995 CC (gold)
43	Michael Krohn-Dehli	MF	2006	2018	59	6	
43	Jannik Vestergaard	DF	2013	2025	59	3	
45	Bent Hansen	MF	1958	1965	58	1	1960 OG (silver)
46	Jes Høgh	DF	1991	2000	57	1	1995 CC (gold)
47	**Kasper Dolberg**	FW	2016	2025	56	12	
48	Allan Simonsen	FW	1972	1986	55	20	
49	Henning Enoksen	FW	1958	1966	54	29	1960 OG (silver)
49	Kent Nielsen	DF	1983	1992	54	3	1992 EC (gold)
49	**Jens Stryger Larsen**	MF	2016	2023	54	3	
49	**Joachim Andersen**	DF	2019	2026	54	2	
53	Martin Laursen	DF	2000	2008	53	2	
54	Frank Arnesen	MF	1977	1987	52	14	
54	Daniel Jensen	MF	2002	2010	52	3	
56	Ivan Nielsen	DF	1980	1989	51	0	
56	Lasse Schöne	MF	2009	2021	51	3	
58	Poul Pedersen	FW	1953	1964	50	17	1960 OG (silver)
58	Ole Madsen	FW	1958	1969	50	42	
60	Pauli Jørgensen	FW	1925	1939	47	44	
60	Claus Jensen	MF	2000	2007	47	8	
60	Thomas Kahlenberg	MF	2003	2015	47	5	
63	Klaus Berggreen	MF	1979	1988	46	5	
64	Johnny Hansen	DF	1965	1978	45	3	
65	Valdemar Laursen	MF	1918	1934	44	1	
65	Fritz Tarp	DF	1918	1934	44	0	
65	Michael Schjønberg	DF	1995	2000	44	3	1995 CC (gold)
65	Allan Nielsen	MF	1995	2002	44	7	
65	**Daniel Wass**	MF	2011	2022	44	1	
65	**Andreas Cornelius**	FW	2012	2022	44	9	
71	Jesper Olsen	MF	1980	1990	43	5	
71	**Mikkel Damsgaard**	MF	2020	2026	43	10	
73	Jørgen Olesen	MF	1951	1962	42	2	
74	Svend Jensen	GK	1927	1939	41	0	
74	Ole Rasmussen	MF	1975	1984	41	1	
74	Stig Tøfting	MF	1993	2002	41	2	
74	Christian Nørgaard	MF	2020	2026	41	2	
78	Michael Rohde	FW	1915	1931	40	22	
78	Ernst Nilsson	FW	1920	1937	40	8	
78	**Andreas Skov Olsen**	FW	2020	2025	40	8	
81	Knud Lundberg	FW	1943	1956	39	10	1948 OG (bronze)
81	Jens Jørgen Hansen	DF	1962	1971	39	0	
81	Ole Qvist	GK	1979	1986	39	0	
81	John Helt	MF	1982	1990	39	0	
81	Henrik Larsen	MF	1989	1996	39	5	1992 EC (gold)
86	Poul "Tist" Nielsen	FW	1910	1925	38	52	1912 OG (silver)
86	Henry Hansen	FW	1922	1934	38	10	
86	Kaj Uldaler	FW	1927	1939	38	15	
86	Jens Peter Hansen	FW	1949	1961	38	18	
86	**Rasmus Højlund**	FW	2022	2026	38	15	
91	Ulrik Le Fevre	FW	1965	1976	37	7	
91	Mathias Jørgensen	DF	2008	2024	37	2	
91	**Jonas Wind**	FW	2020	2025	37	8	
91	**Rasmus Kristensen**	DF	2021	2026	37	2	
95	Kristen Nygaard	FW	1970	1979	36	11	
96	Troels Rasmussen	GK	1982	1991	35	0	
96	Jakob Poulsen	MF	2009	2015	35	5	
98	Poul Petersen	DF	1946	1952	34	0	1948 OG (bronze)
98	Lars Elstrup	FW	1988	1993	34	13	1992 EC (gold)
100	Flemming Ahlberg	DF	1972	1978	33	0	
100	Jan Mølby	MF	1982	1990	33	2	
100	Per Krøldrup	MF	2004	2010	33	0	
103	Poul Jensen	DF	1959	1962	32	0	1960 OG (silver)
103	Jan Bartram	MF	1985	1991	32	5	
103	**Mathias Jensen**	MF	2020	2026	32	1	
106	Sophus Hansen	GK	1911	1920	31	0	1912 OG (silver)
106	Christian Grøthan	DF	1915	1923	31	3	
106	Henry From	GK	1957	1961	31	0	1960 OG (silver)
106	Jørn Sørensen	FW	1958	1961	31	6	1960 OG (silver)
106	Heino Hansen	MF	1972	1978	31	5	
106	Simon Poulsen	DF	2007	2014	31	0	
112	Poul Jensen	DF	1921	1931	30	0	
112	Eyolf Kleven	MF	1930	1942	30	8	
112	Helmuth Søbirk	FW	1935	1945	30	10	
112	Arne Sørensen	MF	1937	1946	30	4	
112	Aage Rou Jensen	FW	1945	1957	30	11	
112	Lars Bastrup	FW	1975	1983	30	10	
112	Henrik Andersen	DF	1985	1994	30	2	1992 EC (gold)
112	Morten Wieghorst	MF	1994	2004	30	3	1995 CC (gold)
112	Stephan Andersen	GK	2007	2014	30	0	
112	**Morten Hjulmand**	MF	2023	2026	30	1	
122	Jan Larsen	DF	1968	1971	29	0	
122	Svend Andresen	DF	1970	1975	29	0	
122	Jørgen Rasmussen	DF	1971	1975	29	0	
125	Oscar Jørgensen	MF	1932	1945	28	0	
125	Eigil Nielsen	GK	1940	1951	28	0	1948 OG (bronze)
125	Leif Nielsen	GK	1964	1967	28	0	
125	Benny Nielsen	FW	1970	1980	28	7	
125	Bjarne Goldbæk	MF	1987	2001	28	0	
130	Ivar Lykke	DF	1911	1920	27	0	1912 OG (silver)
130	Steen Steensen Blicher	DF	1918	1927	27	5	
130	Kaj Hansen	FW	1936	1946	27	12	
130	John Danielsen	FW	1958	1964	27	7	1960 OG (silver)
130	John Lauridsen	MF	1981	1988	27	3	
130	Søren Colding	DF	1996	2004	27	0	
130	Peter Ankersen	DF	2013	2020	27	1	
137	Paul Berth	MF	1911	1922	26	1	1912 OG (silver)
137	Flemming Nielsen	MF	1954	1960	26	4	1960 OG (silver)
137	Verner Nielsen	DF	1955	1958	26	0	
137	Kjeld Thorst	FW	1963	1969	26	6	
137	Torben Nielsen	DF	1969	1972	26	0	
137	Ole Kjær	GK	1977	1984	26	0	
137	Bent Christensen	FW	1989	1994	26	8	1992 EC (gold)
137	**Pione Sisto**	FW	2015	2021	26	1	
137	Henrik Dalsgaard	DF	2016	2021	26	1	
146	Poul L. Hansen	DF	1935	1946	25	0	
146	Ivan Jensen	MF	1945	1949	25	2	1948 OG (bronze)
146	Hans Christian Nielsen	DF	1958	1961	25	0	1960 OG (silver)
146	Ole Sørensen	FW	1961	1969	25	7	
146	Sten Ziegler	MF	1971	1981	25	1	
146	Jacob Laursen	DF	1995	1999	25	0	1995 CC (gold)
146	Michael Silberbauer	MF	2002	2012	25	1	

== See also ==
- Denmark national football team records and statistics
- List of Denmark men's international footballers (1–24 caps)
