= Denmark national football team results (1980–1989) =

This is a list of Association football games played by the Denmark national football team between 1980 and 1989. During the 1980s, the Danish national team played 115 games, winning 56, drawing 22, and losing 37. In these games, they scored 187 goals, while conceding 119 to their opponents. The first game of the 1980s was the May 7, 1980, game against Sweden, the 422nd overall Danish national team game. The last game of the 1980s was the November 15, 1989, game against Romania, the 536th game of the Danish national team.

== Key ==
- EC – European Championship match
- ECQ – European Championship Qualifying match
- F – Friendly match
- NC - Nordic Football Championship match
- OGQ - Olympic Games Qualifying match
- OT - Other tournament(s)
- WC – World Cup match
- WCQ – World Cup Qualifying match

== Games ==
Note that scores are written Denmark first

#	Date	Venue	Opponents	Score	Comp	Denmark scorers
422	1980-05-07	Nya Ullevi, Gothenburg (A)	Sweden	1-0	NC	Jens Steffensen
423	1980-05-21	Idrætsparken, Copenhagen (H)	Spain	2-2	F	Allan Simonsen, Lars Bastrup
424	1980-06-04	Idrætsparken, Copenhagen (H)	Norway	3-1	NC	Benny Nielsen (pen), Frank Arnesen, Preben Elkjær
425	1980-07-12	Idrætsparken, Copenhagen (H)	USSR	0-2	F	
426	1980-08-27	Stade Olympique de la Pontaise, Lausanne (A)	Switzerland	1-1	F	Lars Bastrup
427	1980-09-27	Stadion Centralni, Ljubljana (A)	Yugoslavia	1-2	WCQ	Frank Arnesen
428	1980-10-15	Idrætsparken, Copenhagen (H)	Greece	0-1	WCQ	
429	1980-11-01	Stadio Olimpico, Rome (A)	Italy	0-2	WCQ	
430	1980-11-19	Idrætsparken, Copenhagen (H)	Luxembourg	4-0	WCQ	Frank Arnesen (2), Preben Elkjær, Allan Simonsen
431	1981-04-15	Idrætsparken, Copenhagen (H)	Romania	2-1	F	Allan Simonsen, Lars Bastrup
432	1981-05-01	Stade Municipal, Luxembourg (A)	Luxembourg	2-1	WCQ	Preben Elkjær, Frank Arnesen
433	1981-05-14	Malmö Stadion, Malmö (A)	Sweden	2-1	NC	Lars Bastrup, Preben Elkjær
434	1981-06-03	Idrætsparken, Copenhagen (H)	Italy	3-1	WCQ	Per Røntved, Frank Arnesen, Lars Bastrup
435	1981-08-12	Tammela Stadion, Tampere (A)	Finland	2-1	NC	John Lauridsen, Henrik Eigenbrod
436	1981-08-26	Idrætsparken, Copenhagen (H)	Iceland	3-0	F	Allan Simonsen (2), Lars Lundkvist
437	1981-09-09	Idrætsparken, Copenhagen (H)	Yugoslavia	1-2	WCQ	Preben Elkjær
438	1981-09-23	Idrætsparken, Copenhagen (H)	Norway	2-1	NC	Preben Elkjær, Frank Arnesen (pen)
439	1981-10-14	Harilaou, Salonika (A)	Greece	3-2	WCQ	Søren Lerby, Frank Arnesen, Preben Elkjær
440	1982-05-05	Idrætsparken, Copenhagen (H)	Sweden	1-1	NC	Frank Arnesen
441	1982-05-19	Prater Stadion, Vienna (A)	Austria	0-1	F	
442	1982-05-27	Idrætsparken, Copenhagen (H)	Belgium	1-0	F	Preben Elkjær
443	1982-06-15	Ullevaal, Oslo (A)	Norway	1-2	NC	Michael Laudrup
444	1982-08-11	Idrætsparken, Copenhagen (H)	Finland	3-2	NC	Lars Bastrup, Søren Lerby, Søren Busk
445	1982-09-01	August 23, Bucharest (A)	Romania	0-1	F	
446	1982-09-22	Idrætsparken, Copenhagen (H)	England	2-2	ECQ	Allan Hansen, Jesper Olsen
447	1982-10-27	Idrætsparken, Copenhagen (H)	Czechoslovakia	1-3	F	Michael Laudrup
448	1982-11-10	Stade Municipal, Luxembourg (A)	Luxembourg	2-1	ECQ	Søren Lerby, Klaus Berggreen
449	1983-04-27	Idrætsparken, Copenhagen (H)	Greece	1-0	ECQ	Søren Busk
450	1983-05-04	Aarhus Stadion, Aarhus (H)	Norway	1-2	OGQ	Morten Donnerup
451	1983-05-19	Aarhus Stadion, Aarhus (H)	Norway	2-2	OGQ	Michael Manniche, Brian Chrøis
452	1983-06-01	Idrætsparken, Copenhagen (H)	Hungary	3-1	ECQ	Preben Elkjær, Jesper Olsen, Allan Simonsen (pen)
453	1983-06-22	Aarhus Stadion, Aarhus (H)	Finland	3-0	OGQ	Michael Spangsborg, Michael Laudrup (2)
454	1983-08-17	Ullevaal, Oslo (A)	Norway	1-1	OGQ	Michael Manniche
455	1983-08-24	Keskuskenttä, Rovaniemi (A)	Finland	0-0	OGQ	
456	1983-09-07	Idrætsparken, Copenhagen (H)	France	3-1	F	Michael Laudrup(2), Kenneth Brylle
457	1983-09-21	Wembley Stadium, London (A)	England	1-0	ECQ	Allan Simonsen (pen)
458	1983-10-05	Aarhus Stadion, Aarhus (H)	Poland	0-1	OGQ	
459	1983-10-12	Idrætsparken, Copenhagen (H)	Luxembourg	6-0	ECQ	Michael Laudrup (3), Preben Elkjær (2), Allan Simonsen
460	1983-10-26	Népstadion, Budapest (A)	Hungary	0-1	ECQ	
461	1983-11-16	Spiros Louis, Athens (A)	Greece	2-0	ECQ	Preben Elkjær, Allan Simonsen
462	1984-03-14	Olympisch Stadion, Amsterdam (A)	Netherlands	0-6	F	
463	1984-04-11	Estadio Luis Casanova, Valencia (A)	Spain	1-2	F	John Eriksen
464	1984-04-18	Ernst-Grube-Stadion, Magdeburg (A)	East Germany	0-4	OGQ	
465	1984-04-22	Motor Stadium, Lublin (A)	Poland	0-0	OGQ	
466	1984-05-16	Strahov, Prague (A)	Czechoslovakia	0-1	F	
467	1984-06-06	Nya Ullevi, Gothenburg (A)	Sweden	1-0	F	Preben Elkjær
468	1984-06-08	Idrætsparken, Copenhagen (H)	Bulgaria	1-1	F	Michael Laudrup
469	1984-06-12	Parc des Princes, Paris (A)	France	0-1	EC	
470	1984-06-16	Stade Gerland, Lyon (N)	Yugoslavia	5-0	EC	Frank Arnesen (2), Klaus Berggreen, Preben Elkjær, John Lauridsen
471	1984-06-19	Stade de la Meinau, Strasbourg (N)	Belgium	3-2	EC	Frank Arnesen, Kenneth Brylle, Preben Elkjær
472	1984-06-24	Stade Gerland, Lyon (N)	Spain	1-1	EC	Søren Lerby
473	1984-09-12	Idrætsparken, Copenhagen (H)	Austria	3-1	F	Michael Laudrup, Flemming Christensen, Henrik Eigenbrod
474	1984-09-26	Idrætsparken, Copenhagen (H)	Norway	1-0	WCQ	Preben Elkjær
475	1984-10-17	Wankdorf Stadion, Bern (A)	Switzerland	0-1	WCQ	
476	1984-11-14	Idrætsparken, Copenhagen (H)	Republic of Ireland	3-0	WCQ	Preben Elkjær (2), Søren Lerby
477	1985-01-27	Norte e Sur, Tegucigalpa (A)	Honduras	0-1	F	
478	1985-05-08	Idrætsparken, Copenhagen (H)	East Germany	4-1	F	Michael Laudrup (2), John Lauridsen, Klaus Berggreen
479	1985-06-05	Idrætsparken, Copenhagen (H)	USSR	4-2	WCQ	Preben Elkjær (2), Michael Laudrup (2)
480	1985-09-11	Idrætsparken, Copenhagen (H)	Sweden	0-3	F	
481	1985-09-25	Lenin Stadium, Moscow (A)	USSR	0-1	WCQ	
482	1985-10-09	Idrætsparken, Copenhagen (H)	Switzerland	0-0	WCQ	
483	1985-10-16	Ullevaal, Oslo (A)	Norway	5-1	WCQ	Michael Laudrup, Søren Lerby (pen), Preben Elkjær, Klaus Berggreen (2)
484	1985-11-13	Lansdowne Road, Dublin (A)	Republic of Ireland	4-1	WCQ	Preben Elkjær (2), Michael Laudrup, John Sivebæk
485	1986-03-26	Windsor Park, Belfast (A)	Northern Ireland	1-1	F	Flemming Christensen
486	1986-04-09	Vasil Levski National Stadium, Sofia (A)	Bulgaria	0-3	F	
487	1986-05-13	Ullevaal, Oslo (A)	Norway	0-1	F	
488	1986-05-16	Idrætsparken, Copenhagen (H)	Poland	1-0	F	Preben Elkjær
489	1986-06-04	Neza 86, Nezahualcoyotl (N)	Scotland	1-0	WC	Preben Elkjær
490	1986-06-08	Neza 86, Nezahualcoyotl (N)	Uruguay	6-1	WC	Preben Elkjær (3), Søren Lerby, Michael Laudrup, Jesper Olsen
491	1986-06-13	Corregidora, Querétaro (N)	West Germany	2-0	WC	Jesper Olsen, John Eriksen
492	1986-06-18	Corregidora, Querétaro (N)	Spain	1-5	WC	Jesper Olsen
493	1986-09-10	Zentralstadion, Leipzig (A)	East Germany	1-0	F	John Eriksen
494	1986-09-24	Idrætsparken, Copenhagen (H)	Germany	0-2	F	
495	1986-10-29	Idrætsparken, Copenhagen (H)	Finland	1-0	ECQ	Jens Jørn Bertelsen
496	1986-11-12	Tehelné Park, Bratislava (A)	Czechoslovakia	0-0	ECQ	
497	1987-04-29	Olympiastadion, Helsinki (A)	Finland	1-0	ECQ	Jan Mølby
498	1987-05-20	Levadias, Levadia (A)	Greece	5-0	OGQ	Flemming Povlsen, Claus Nielsen (2), Ulrik Moseby, Kim Vilfort
499	1987-06-03	Idrætsparken, Copenhagen (H)	Czechoslovakia	1-1	ECQ	Jan Mølby
500	1987-06-10	Aalborg Stadion, Aalborg (H)	Romania	8-0	OGQ	Claus Nielsen (3), Ulrik Moseby, Bjørn Kristensen, Lars Olsen, Flemming Povlsen, John Jensen
501	1987-08-26	Råsunda, Stockholm (A)	Sweden	0-1	F	
502	1987-09-03	Stadionul Dumitru Sechelariu, Bacău (A)	Romania	2-1	OGQ	Kent Nielsen, Lars Olsen
503	1987-09-09	Ninian Park, Cardiff (A)	Wales	0-1	ECQ	
504	1987-09-23	Volksparkstadion, Hamburg (A)	West Germany	0-1	F	Preben Elkjær
505	1987-10-14	Idrætsparken, Copenhagen (H)	Wales	1-0	ECQ	Preben Elkjær
506	1987-10-28	Stadion Florian Kryger, Szczecin (A)	Poland	2-0	OGQ	Kim Vilfort (2)
507	1987-11-18	Aarhus Stadion, Aarhus (H)	West Germany	0-1	OGQ	
508	1988-03-30	Stadion an der Bremer Brücke, Osnabrück (A)	West Germany	1-1	OGQ	Claus Nielsen
509	1988-04-20	Aalborg Stadion, Aalborg (H)	Greece	4-0	OGQ	Flemming Povlsen (2), Brian Laudrup, Claus Nielsen
510	1988-04-27	Prater Stadion, Vienna (A)	Austria	0-1	F	
511	1988-05-10	Népstadion, Budapest (A)	Hungary	2-2	F	Per Frimann, John Eriksen
512	1988-05-18	Aarhus Stadion, Aarhus (H)	Poland	3-0	OGQ	Bjørn Kristensen, Flemming Povlsen, Kim Vilfort
513	1988-06-01	Idrætsparken, Copenhagen (H)	Czechoslovakia	0-1	F	
514	1988-06-05	Odense Stadion, Odense (H)	Belgium	3-1	F	Morten Olsen, John Eriksen (2)
515	1988-06-11	Niedersachsen Stadion, Hannover (N)	Spain	2-3	EC	Michael Laudrup, Flemming Povlsen
516	1988-06-14	Parkstadion, Gelsenkirchen (A)	West Germany	0-2	EC	
517	1988-06-17	Müngersdorfer Stadion, Köln (N)	Italy	0-2	EC	
518	1988-08-31	Råsunda, Stockholm (A)	Sweden	2-1	F	Lars Elstrup (2)
519	1988-09-14	Wembley Stadium, London (A)	England	0-1	F	
520	1988-09-28	Idrætsparken, Copenhagen (H)	Iceland	1-0	F	Jan Bartram
521	1988-10-19	Spiros Louis, Athens (A)	Greece	1-1	WCQ	Flemming Povlsen
522	1988-11-02	Idrætsparken, Copenhagen (H)	Bulgaria	1-1	WCQ	Lars Elstrup
523	1989-02-08	Ta'Qali Stadium, Valletta (A)	Malta	2-0	OT	Lars Elstrup, Henrik Larsen
524	1989-02-10	Ta'Qali Stadium, Valletta (N)	Finland	0-0	OT	
525	1989-02-12	Ta'Qali Stadium, Valletta (N)	Algeria	0-0	OT	
526	1989-02-22	Arena Garibaldi, Pisa (A)	Italy	0-1	F	
527	1989-04-12	Aalborg Stadion, Aalborg (H)	Canada	2-0	F	Lars Elstrup, own goal (Ian Bridge)
528	1989-04-26	Vasil Levski National Stadium, Sofia (A)	Bulgaria	2-0	WCQ	Flemming Povlsen, Brian Laudrup
529	1989-05-17	Idrætsparken, Copenhagen (H)	Greece	7-1	WCQ	Brian Laudrup, Jan Bartram, Kent Nielsen, Flemming Povlsen, Kim Vilfort, Henrik Andersen, Michael Laudrup
530	1989-06-07	Idrætsparken, Copenhagen (H)	England	1-1	F	Lars Elstrup
531	1989-06-14	Idrætsparken, Copenhagen (H)	Sweden	6-0	OT	Flemming Povlsen, Lars Elstrup (2), Henrik Andersen, Jan Bartram, Michael Laudrup
532	1989-06-18	Idrætsparken, Copenhagen (H)	Brazil	4-0	OT	Morten Olsen, Michael Laudrup (2), Lars Olsen
533	1989-08-23	Olympisch Stadion, Bruges (A)	Belgium	0-3	F	
534	1989-09-06	Olympisch Stadion, Amsterdam (A)	Netherlands	2-2	F	Jan Bartram, Jan Heintze
535	1989-10-11	Idrætsparken, Copenhagen (H)	Romania	3-0	WCQ	Kent Nielsen, Brian Laudrup, Flemming Povlsen
536	1989-11-15	August 23, Bucharest (A)	Romania	1-3	WCQ	Flemming Povlsen

== See also ==
- List of Denmark national football team results
- Denmark national football team statistics

== Sources ==
- Landsholdsdatabasen at Danish Football Association
- A-LANDSKAMPE - 1980 - 1989 at Haslund.info
