= Denmark national football team results =

For lists of Denmark national football team results see:

- Denmark national football team results (1908–1929)
- Denmark national football team results (1930–1949)
- Denmark national football team results (1950–1959)
- Denmark national football team results (1960–1969)
- Denmark national football team results (1970–1979)
- Denmark national football team results (1980–1989)
- Denmark national football team results (1990–1999)
- Denmark national football team results (2000–2009)
- Denmark national football team results (2010–2019)
- Denmark national football team results (2020–present)
- Denmark national football team results (unofficial matches)
