= Denmark national football team results (1990–1999) =

This is a list of association football games played by the Denmark national football team from 1990 to 1999. During the 1990s, the Danish national team played 102 games, winning 52, drawing 27, and losing 23. In these games, they scored 140 goals, while conceding 83 to their opponents. The first game of the 1990s was the 5 February 1990 game against the United Arab Emirates, the 537th overall Danish national team game. The last game of the 1990s was the 17 November 1999 game against Israel, the 638th game of the Danish national team.

== Key ==
- EC – European Championship match
- ECQ – European Championship Qualifying match
- F – Friendly match
- IC1 – Artemio Franchi Trophy
- IC2 – Confederations Cup
- OT – Other tournament(s)
- WC – World Cup match
- WCQ – World Cup Qualifying match

== Games ==
Note that scores are written Denmark first

#	Date	Venue	Opponents	Score	Comp	Denmark scorers
537	1990-02-05	Al-Maktoum Stadium, Dubai (A)	UAE	1-1	F	John Larsen
538	1990-02-14	Nasser Stadium, Cairo (A)	Egypt	0-0	F	
539	1990-04-11	Idrætsparken, Copenhagen (H)	Turkey	1-0	F	Lars Jakobsen
540	1990-05-15	Wembley, London (A)	England	0-1	F	
541	1990-05-30	Parkstadion, Gelsenkirchen (A)	Germany	0-1	F	
542	1990-06-06	Lerkendal Stadion, Trondheim (A)	Norway	2-1	F	Flemming Povlsen, Michael Laudrup
543	1990-09-05	Arosvallen, Västerås (A)	Sweden	1-0	F	Bent Christensen
544	1990-09-11	Idrætsparken, Copenhagen (H)	Wales	1-0	F	Brian Laudrup
545	1990-10-10	Idrætsparken, Copenhagen (H)	Faroe Islands	4-1	ECQ	Michael Laudrup (2), Lars Elstrup, Flemming Povlsen
546	1990-10-17	Windsor Park, Belfast (A)	Northern Ireland	1-1	ECQ	Jan Bartram
547	1990-11-14	Idrætsparken, Copenhagen (H)	Yugoslavia	0-2	ECQ	
548	1991-04-09	Odense Stadion, Odense (H)	Bulgaria	1-1	F	Jes Høgh
549	1991-05-01	Crvena Zvesda Stadium, Beograd (A)	Yugoslavia	2-1	ECQ	Bent Christensen (2)
550	1991-06-05	Odense Stadion, Odense (H)	Austria	2-1	ECQ	Bent Christensen (2)
551	1991-06-12	Malmö Stadion, Malmö (N)	Italy	0-2	OT	
552	1991-06-15	Idrottsparken, Norrköping (A)	Sweden	0-4	OT	
553	1991-09-04	Laurgardalsvöllur, Reykjavík (A)	Iceland	0-0	F	
554	1991-09-25	Landskrona IP, Landskrona (N)	Faroe Islands	4-0	ECQ	Kim Christofte, Bent Christensen, Frank Pingel, Kim Vilfort
555	1991-10-09	Ernst Happel, Wien (A)	Austria	3-0	ECQ	own goal (Peter Artner), Flemming Povlsen, Bent Christensen
556	1991-11-13	Odense Stadion, Odense (H)	Northern Ireland	2-1	ECQ	Flemming Povlsen (2)
557	1992-04-08	Inönü Stadi, Ankara (A)	Turkey	1-2	F	Lars Elstrup
558	1992-04-29	Aarhus Stadion, Aarhus (H)	Norway	1-0	F	Lars Elstrup
559	1992-06-03	Brøndby Stadion, Copenhagen (H)	CIS	1-1	F	Bent Christensen
560	1992-06-11	Malmö Stadion, Malmö (N)	England	0-0	EC	
561	1992-06-14	Nya Ullevi, Gothenburg (A)	Sweden	0-1	EC	
562	1992-06-17	Malmö Stadion, Malmö (N)	France	2-1	EC	Henrik Larsen, Lars Elstrup
563	1992-06-22	Nya Ullevi, Gothenburg (N)	Netherlands	2-2	EC	Henrik Larsen
564	1992-06-26	Nya Ullevi, Gothenburg (N)	Germany	2-0	EC	John Jensen, Kim Vilfort
565	1992-08-26	Zalgiris, Vilnius (A)	Latvia	0-0	WCQ	
566	1992-09-09	Parken Stadium, Copenhagen (H)	Germany	1-2	F	Lars Elstrup
567	1992-09-23	Zalgiris, Vilnius (A)	Lithuania	0-0	WCQ	
568	1992-10-14	Parken Stadium, Copenhagen (H)	Republic of Ireland	0-0	WCQ	
569	1992-11-18	Windsor Park, Belfast (A)	Northern Ireland	1-0	WCQ	Henrik Larsen
570	1993-01-30	Sun Devil Stadium, Tempe (A)	United States	2-2	F	Mark Strudal, Jakob Kjeldbjerg
571	1993-02-24	Estadio Mundialista, Mar del Plata (A)	Argentina	1-1	IC1	own goal (Nestor Craviotto)
572	1993-03-31	Parken Stadium, Copenhagen (H)	Spain	1-0	WCQ	Flemming Povlsen
573	1993-04-14	Parken Stadium, Copenhagen (H)	Latvia	2-0	WCQ	Kim Vilfort, Mark Strudal
574	1993-04-28	Lansdowne Road, Dublin (H)	Republic of Ireland	1-1	WCQ	Kim Vilfort
575	1993-06-02	Parken Stadium, Copenhagen (H)	Albania	4-0	WCQ	John Jensen, Frank Pingel (2), Peter Møller
576	1993-08-25	Parken Stadium, Copenhagen (H)	Lithuania	4-0	WCQ	Lars Olsen, Frank Pingel, Brian Laudrup
577	1993-09-08	Qemel Stafa, Tirana (A)	Albania	1-0	WCQ	Frank Pingel
578	1993-10-13	Parken Stadium, Copenhagen (H)	Northern Ireland	1-0	WCQ	Brian Laudrup
579	1993-11-17	Estadio Ramón Sánchez Pizjuán, Seville (A)	Spain	0-1	WCQ	
580	1994-03-09	Wembley, London (A)	England	0-1	F	
581	1994-04-20	Parken Stadium, Copenhagen (H)	Hungary	3-1	F	Michael Laudrup (2), Flemming Povlsen
582	1994-05-26	Parken Stadium, Copenhagen (H)	Sweden	1-0	F	Michael Laudrup
583	1994-06-01	Ullevaal, Oslo (H)	Norway	1-2	F	Flemming Povlsen
584	1994-08-17	Parken Stadium, Copenhagen (H)	Finland	2-1	F	Brian Laudrup, Morten Wieghorst
585	1994-09-07	Gradski Stadium, Skopje (A)	Macedonia	1-1	ECQ	Flemming Povlsen
586	1994-10-12	Parken Stadium, Copenhagen (H)	Belgium	3-1	ECQ	Kim Vilfort, John Jensen, Mark Strudal
587	1994-11-16	Estadio Ramón Sánchez Pizjuán, Seville (A)	Spain	0-3	ECQ	
588	1995-01-08	King Fahd International Stadium, Riyadh (A)	Saudi Arabia	2-0	IC2	Brian Laudrup, Morten Wieghorst
589	1995-01-10	King Fahd International Stadium, Riyadh (A)	Mexico	1-1	IC2	Peter Rasmussen
590	1995-01-13	King Fahd International Stadium, Riyadh (A)	Argentina	2-0	IC2	Michael Laudrup, Peter Rasmussen
591	1995-03-29	Tsirion, Limassol (A)	Cyprus	1-1	ECQ	Michael Schjønberg
592	1995-04-26	Parken Stadium, Copenhagen (H)	Macedonia	1-0	ECQ	Peter Nielsen
593	1995-05-31	Olympiastadion, Helsinki (A)	Finland	1-0	F	Mikkel Beck
594	1995-06-07	Parken Stadium, Copenhagen (H)	Cyprus	4-0	ECQ	Kim Vilfort (2), Brian Laudrup, Michael Laudrup
595	1995-08-16	Razdan Stadium, Yerevan (A)	Armenia	2-0	ECQ	Michael Laudrup, Allan Nielsen
596	1995-09-06	King Baudouin Stadium, Brussels (A)	Belgium	3-1	ECQ	Michael Laudrup, Mikkel Beck, Kim Vilfort
597	1995-10-11	Parken Stadium, Copenhagen (H)	Spain	1-1	ECQ	Kim Vilfort
598	1995-11-15	Parken Stadium, Copenhagen (H)	Armenia	3-1	ECQ	Michael Schjønberg, Mikkel Beck, Michael Laudrup
599	1996-03-27	Olympic Stadium, Munich (A)	Germany	0-2	F	
600	1996-04-24	Parken Stadium, Copenhagen (H)	Scotland	2-0	F	Michael Laudrup, Brian Laudrup
601	1996-06-02	Parken Stadium, Copenhagen (H)	Ghana	1-0	F	Thomas Helveg
602	1996-06-09	Hillsborough Stadium, Sheffield (N)	Portugal	1-1	EC	Brian Laudrup
603	1996-06-16	Hillsborough Stadium, Sheffield (N)	Croatia	0-3	EC	
604	1996-06-19	Hillsborough Stadium, Sheffield (N)	Turkey	3-0	EC	Brian Laudrup (2), Allan Nielsen
605	1996-08-14	Nya Ullevi, Gothenburg (A)	Sweden	1-0	F	Ole Bjur
606	1996-09-01	Stadion Centralni, Ljubljana (A)	Slovenia	2-0	WCQ	Allan Nielsen, Michael Schjønberg
607	1996-10-09	Parken Stadium, Copenhagen (H)	Greece	2-1	WCQ	own goal (Theodoros Zagorakis), Brian Laudrup
608	1996-11-09	Parken Stadium, Copenhagen (H)	France	1-0	F	Per Pedersen
609	1997-03-29	Poljud Stadium, Split (A)	Croatia	1-1	WCQ	Brian Laudrup
610	1997-04-30	Parken Stadium, Copenhagen (H)	Slovenia	4-0	WCQ	Allan Nielsen (2), Per Pedersen, Brian Laudrup
611	1997-06-08	Parken Stadium, Copenhagen (H)	Bosnia-Herzegovina	2-0	WCQ	Marc Rieper, Miklos Molnar
612	1997-08-20	Koševo Stadium, Sarajevo (A)	Bosnia-Herzegovina	0-3	WCQ	
613	1997-09-10	Parken Stadium, Copenhagen (H)	Croatia	3-1	WCQ	Brian Laudrup, Michael Laudrup, Miklos Molnar
614	1997-10-11	Panathinaiko Stadium, Athens (A)	Greece	0-0	WCQ	
615	1998-03-25	Ibrox Stadium, Glasgow (A)	Scotland	1-0	F	Brian Laudrup
616	1998-04-22	Parken Stadium, Copenhagen (H)	Norway	0-2	F	
617	1998-05-28	Malmö Stadion, Malmö (A)	Sweden	0-3	F	
618	1998-06-05	Parken Stadium, Copenhagen (H)	Cameroon	1-2	F	Peter Møller
619	1998-06-12	Stade Félix Bollaert, Lens (N)	Saudi Arabia	1-0	WC	Marc Rieper
620	1998-06-18	Stadium Municipal, Toulouse (N)	South Africa	1-1	WC	Allan Nielsen
621	1998-06-24	Stade Gerland, Lyon (A)	France	1-2	WC	Michael Laudrup (pen)
622	1998-06-28	Stade de France, St. Denis (N)	Nigeria	4-1	WC	Peter Møller, Brian Laudrup, Ebbe Sand, Thomas Helveg
623	1998-07-03	Stade de la Beaujoire, Nantes (N)	Brazil	2-3	WC	Martin Jørgensen, Brian Laudrup
624	1998-08-19	Letná Stadium, Prague (A)	Czech Republic	1-0	F	Thomas Gravesen
625	1998-09-05	Dinamo Stadion, Minsk (A)	Belarus	0-0	ECQ	
626	1998-10-10	Parken Stadium, Copenhagen (H)	Wales	1-2	ECQ	Søren Frederiksen
627	1998-10-14	Hardturm, Zürich (A)	Switzerland	1-1	ECQ	Ole Tobiasen
628	1999-02-10	Poljud Stadium, Split (A)	Croatia	1-0	F	Ebbe Sand
629	1999-03-27	Parken Stadium, Copenhagen (H)	Italy	1-2	ECQ	Ebbe Sand
630	1999-04-28	Parken Stadium, Copenhagen (H)	South Africa	1-1	F	Ebbe Sand
631	1999-06-05	Parken Stadium, Copenhagen (H)	Belarus	1-0	ECQ	Jan Heintze
632	1999-06-09	Anfield Road, Liverpool (N)	Wales	2-0	ECQ	Jon Dahl Tomasson, Stig Tøfting (pen)
633	1999-08-18	Parken Stadium, Copenhagen (H)	Netherlands	0-0	F	
634	1999-09-04	Parken Stadium, Copenhagen (H)	Switzerland	2-1	ECQ	Allan Nielsen, Jon Dahl Tomasson
635	1999-09-08	Stadio San Paolo, Naples (A)	Italy	3-2	ECQ	Martin Jørgensen (pen), Morten Wieghorst, Jon Dahl Tomasson
636	1999-10-10	Parken Stadium, Copenhagen (H)	Iran	0-0	F	
637	1999-11-13	Ramat Gan Stadium, Ramat Gan (A)	Israel	5-0	ECQ	Jon Dahl Tomasson (2), Stig Tøfting, Martin Jørgensen, Brian Steen Nielsen
638	1999-11-17	Parken Stadium, Copenhagen (H)	Israel	3-0	ECQ	Ebbe Sand, Brian Steen Nielsen, Jon Dahl Tomasson

== See also ==
- List of Denmark national football team results
- Denmark national football team statistics

== Sources ==
- Landsholdsdatabasen at Danish Football Association
- A-LANDSKAMPE - 1990 - 1999 at Haslund.info
