= Poul Erik Petersen =

Danish footballer

Poul Erik "Popper" Petersen (7 May 1927 – 14 October 1992) was a Danish amateur association football player, who played for Køge Boldklub in Denmark. He was the top goalscorer of the 1952 Danish football championship. He played 15 games and scored six goals for the Denmark national football team. He represented Denmark at the 1952 Summer Olympics.
