= Ove Andersen (footballer) =

Danish footballer

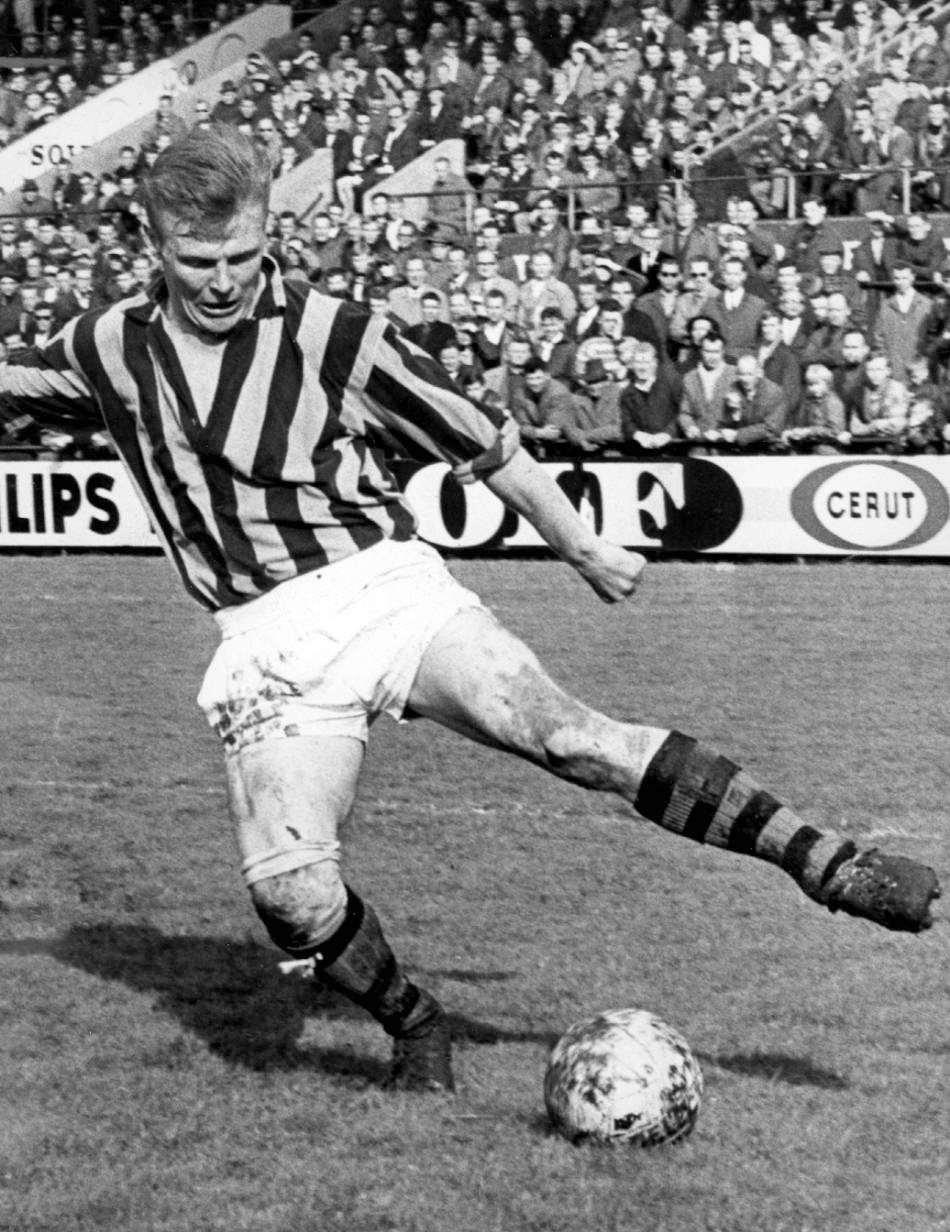
- Andersen in 1955

Personal information
- Date of birth: 30 June 1937 (age 89)
- Place of birth: Copenhagen, Denmark
- Position: Forward

Senior career*
Years	Team	Apps	(Gls)
1955–1965	Brønshøj Boldklub		

International career
1954	Denmark U19	1	(0)
1956	Denmark U21	2	(0)
1965	Denmark B	1	(0)
1955–1965	Denmark	12	(5)
- * Club domestic league appearances and goals

Ove Andersen (born 30 June 1937) is a Danish former footballer who played as a forward for Brønshøj Boldklub. He made 12 appearances for the Denmark national team from 1956 to 1963.
