= Jørgen Olesen =

Danish footballer (1924-1999)

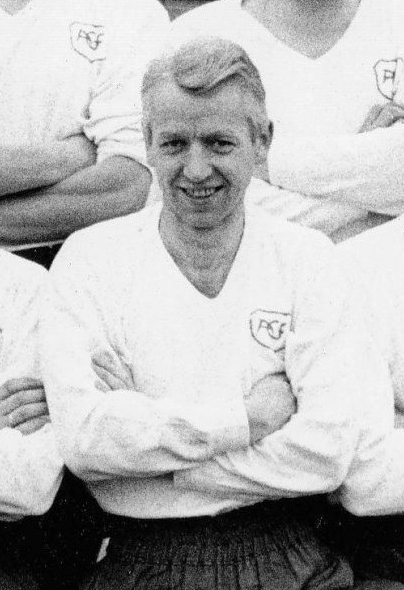
- Jørgen Olesen in 1960

Personal information
- Full name: Jørgen Christian Thomdahl Olesen
- Date of birth: 21 January 1924
- Place of birth: Aarhus, Denmark
- Date of death: 13 June 1999 (aged 75)
- Place of death: Viby, Denmark
- Position: Midfielder

Youth career
- 1933–: AGF

Senior career*
Years	Team	Apps	(Gls)
1945–1962	AGF		

International career
1951–1962	Denmark	42	(2)
- * Club domestic league appearances and goals

Jørgen Christian Thomdahl Olesen (21 January 1924 – 13 June 1999) was a Danish association football player, who played 42 games and scored two goals for the Denmark national football team. Born in Aarhus, he played his entire career as a midfielder for local club Aarhus Gymnastik Forening (AGF). He was also part of Denmark's squad at the 1952 Summer Olympics, but he did not play in any matches. He died in the Aarhus suburb Viby in June 1999, 75 years old. In 2022, Olesen was posthumously inducted into the Danish football Hall of Fame, with his son receiving the honor for his late father's at Parken Stadium.
