= Kurt Nielsen (footballer) =

Danish footballer and manager (1924–1986)

Personal information
- Full name: Kurt Børge Nikolaj Nielsen
- Date of birth: 2 September 1924
- Place of birth: Skovshoved, Denmark
- Date of death: 17 July 1986 (aged 61)
- Place of death: Nykøbing Falster, Denmark
- Position: Striker

Senior career*
Years	Team	Apps	(Gls)
1937–1953	Skovshoved IF		
1954–1956	Marseille	3	(1)
1954–1955	Aix (loan)	16	(7)

International career
1952–1953	Denmark	3	(3)

Managerial career
- 19XX–19XX: Skovshoved IF
- 1961–1965: B 1901
- 1965–1967: Frederikshavn fI
- 1967–1975: B 1901
- 1976–1979: Denmark
- 1978–1980: Herfølge BK
- 1980–1981: B 1901
- 198X–198X: Fakse BK
- * Club domestic league appearances and goals

Kurt Børge Nikolaj "Nikkelaj" Nielsen (2 September 1924 – 17 July 1986) was a Danish professional football player and manager, who most prominently coached the Denmark national team from 1976 to 1979.

He started his career for Danish club Skovshoved IF, before he moved abroad to play professionally for French clubs Olympique de Marseille and AS Aix. He played three matches and scored three goals for the Denmark national team during 1952 and 1953, before his professional career hindered further games. Following his retirement in 1956, Nikkelaj coached a number of Danish clubs, before he was appointed Denmark national team manager in 1976. He coached Denmark to 13 wins in his 31 games in charge, but did not manage to qualify Denmark for any major tournaments.
