= Erik Hansen (footballer) =

Danish footballer (1922–2010)

Personal information
- Full name: Erik Richard Hansen
- Date of birth: 16 November 1922
- Place of birth: Copenhagen, Denmark
- Date of death: 8 August 2010 (aged 87)
- Position: Midfielder

Senior career*
Years	Team	Apps	(Gls)
- Kjøbenhavns Boldklub

International career
1951–1953	Denmark	7	(1)
- * Club domestic league appearances and goals

Erik Richard Hansen (16 November 1922 – 8 August 2010) was a Danish football player and coach who played as a midfielder. He made seven appearances for the Denmark national team from 1951 to 1953.

Hansen played for Kjøbenhavns Boldklub and reached 150 matches for the club.

At KB he was famous for his highly unorthodox penalty kick method, where he would start all the way from midfield and make a zig-zaging run to the ball to confuse the goalkeeper.

After his playing career Hansen was a part of the committee to choose to Danish national team. The committee's task was to select the players, which often was a tedious and ineffective progress. During his tenure, the responsibility was consolidated to one person, making him a de facto head coach position.

He also worked as the owner of a sports wear store until his retirement.
