= Denmark national football team results (2020–present) =

This article provides details of international football games played by the Denmark national football team from 2020 to present.

== Results ==
Key
Win
Draw
Defeat

=== 2020 ===
5 September 2020 2020–21 Nations League	Denmark	0–2	Belgium	Copenhagen, Denmark
20:45 UTC+2		Report	Denayer 9'; Mertens 77'	Stadium: Parken Stadium; Attendance: 0 (Note: Due to the COVID-19 pandemic in Europe, all matches scheduled for September 2020 were played behind closed doors.); Referee: Sandro Schärer (Switzerland)

8 September 2020 2020–21 Nations League	Denmark	0–0	England	Copenhagen, Denmark
20:45 UTC+2		Report		Stadium: Parken Stadium; Attendance: 0 Referee: István Kovács (Romania)

7 October 2020 Friendly	Denmark	4–0	Faroe Islands	Herning, Denmark
18:00 UTC+2	Skov Olsen 22'; Eriksen 27' (pen.); Mæhle 32'; Cornelius 45'	Report		Stadium: MCH Arena; Attendance: 207; Referee: Glenn Nyberg (Sweden)
Note: The match was originally scheduled for 27 March 2020, but postponed due to the COVID-19 pandemic in Denmark.

11 October 2020 2020–21 Nations League	Iceland	0–3	Denmark	Reykjavík, Iceland
18:45 UTC+0		Report	Sigurjónsson 45' (o.g.); Eriksen 46'; Skov 61'	Stadium: Laugardalsvöllur; Attendance: 60; Referee: Bojan Pandžić (Sweden)

14 October 2020 2020–21 Nations League	England	0–1	Denmark	London, England
19:45 UTC+1		Report	Eriksen 35' (pen.)	Stadium: Wembley Stadium; Attendance: 0 (Note: Due to the COVID-19 pandemic in the United Kingdom, England played their home matches behind closed doors.); Referee: Jesús Gil Manzano (Spain)

11 November 2020 Friendly	Denmark	2–0	Sweden	Brøndby, Denmark
19:30 UTC+1	Wind 61'; Bah 74'	Report		Stadium: Brøndby Stadium; Attendance: 141; Referee: Espen Eskås (Norway)
Note: The match was originally scheduled for 7 June 2020, but postponed due to the COVID-19 pandemic in Denmark.

15 November 2020 2020–21 Nations League	Denmark	2–1	Iceland	Copenhagen, Denmark
20:45 UTC+1	Eriksen 12' (pen.), 90+2' (pen.)	Report	Kjartansson 85'	Stadium: Parken Stadium; Attendance: 141; Referee: Halil Umut Meler (Turkey)

18 November 2020 2020–21 Nations League	Belgium	4–2	Denmark	Leuven, Belgium
20:45 UTC+1	Tielemans 3'; Lukaku 57', 69'; De Bruyne 87'	Report	Wind 17'; Chadli 86' (o.g.)	Stadium: Den Dreef; Attendance: 0 Referee: Slavko Vinčić (Slovenia)

=== 2021 ===
25 March 2021 2022 World Cup qualification	Israel	0–2	Denmark	Tel Aviv, Israel
19:00 UTC+2		Report	Braithwaite 13'; Wind 67'	Stadium: Bloomfield Stadium; Attendance: 5,000; Referee: Craig Pawson (England)

28 March 2021 2022 World Cup qualification	Denmark	8–0	Moldova	Herning, Denmark
18:00 UTC+2	Dolberg 19' (pen.), 48'; Damsgaard 21', 29'; Stryger Larsen 35'; Jensen 39'; Skov 81'; Ingvartsen 89'	Report		Stadium: MCH Arena; Attendance: 0 Referee: Aliyar Aghayev (Azerbaijan)

31 March 2021 2022 World Cup qualification	Austria	0–4	Denmark	Vienna, Austria
20:45 UTC+2		Report	Skov Olsen 58', 74'; Mæhle 63'; Højbjerg 67'	Stadium: Ernst-Happel-Stadion; Attendance: 0 Referee: Artur Soares Dias (Portugal)

2 June 2021 Friendly	Germany	1–1	Denmark	Innsbruck, Austria
21:00 UTC+2	Neuhaus 48'	Report	Poulsen 71'	Stadium: Tivoli Stadion Tirol; Attendance: 0 Referee: Julian Weinberger (Austria)

6 June 2021 Friendly	Denmark	2–0	Bosnia and Herzegovina	Brøndby, Denmark
18:00 UTC+2	Braithwaite 18'; Cornelius 73'	Report		Stadium: Brøndby Stadium; Attendance: 7,459; Referee: Petri Viljanen (Finland)

12 June 2021 Euro 2020 Group B	Denmark	0–1	Finland	Copenhagen, Denmark
18:00 UTC+2		Report	Pohjanpalo 60'	Stadium: Parken Stadium; Attendance: 15,200; Referee: Anthony Taylor (England)
Note: In the 43rd minute, the match was suspended after Danish midfielder Christian Eriksen collapsed on the pitch. Eriksen was transferred to a local hospital and stabilised. The match was resumed at 20:30 CEST, with the last four minutes of the first half to be completed prior to a five-minute half-time break.

17 June 2021 Euro 2020 Group B	Denmark	1–2	Belgium	Copenhagen, Denmark
18:00 UTC+2	Poulsen 2'	Report	T. Hazard 55'; De Bruyne 70'	Stadium: Parken Stadium; Attendance: 23,395; Referee: Björn Kuipers (Netherlands)

21 June 2021 Euro 2020 Group B	Russia	1–4	Denmark	Copenhagen, Denmark
21:00 UTC+2	Dzyuba 70' (pen.)	Report	Damsgaard 38'; Poulsen 59'; Christensen 79'; Mæhle 82'	Stadium: Parken Stadium; Attendance: 23,644; Referee: Clément Turpin (France)

26 June 2021 Euro 2020 R16	Wales	0–4	Denmark	Amsterdam, Netherlands
18:00 UTC+2	Wilson (red card) 90'	Report	Dolberg 27', 48'; Mæhle 88'; Braithwaite 90+4'	Stadium: Johan Cruyff Arena; Attendance: 14,645; Referee: Daniel Siebert (Germany)

3 July 2021 Euro 2020 QF	Czech Republic	1–2	Denmark	Baku, Azerbaijan
20:00 UTC+4	Schick 49'	Report	Delaney 5'; Dolberg 42'	Stadium: Olympic Stadium; Attendance: 16,306; Referee: Björn Kuipers (Netherlands)

7 July 2021 Euro 2020 SF	England	2–1 (a.e.t.)	Denmark	London, England
20:00 UTC+1	Kjær 39' (o.g.); Kane (penalty missed) 104', 104'	Report	Damsgaard 30'	Stadium: Wembley Stadium; Attendance: 64,950; Referee: Danny Makkelie (Netherlands)

1 September 2021 2022 World Cup qualification	Denmark	2–0	Scotland	Copenhagen, Denmark
20:45 UTC+2	Wass 14'; Mæhle 15'	Report		Stadium: Parken Stadium; Attendance: 34,562; Referee: Ovidiu Haţegan (Romania)

4 September 2021 2022 World Cup qualification	Faroe Islands	0–1	Denmark	Tórshavn, Faroe Islands
19:45 UTC+1		Report	Wind 85'	Stadium: Tórsvøllur; Attendance: 4,620; Referee: Fran Jović (Croatia)

7 September 2021 2022 World Cup qualification	Denmark	5–0	Israel	Copenhagen, Denmark
20:45 UTC+2	Poulsen 28'; Kjær 31'; Skov Olsen 41'; Delaney 58'; Cornelius 90+1'	Report		Stadium: Parken Stadium; Attendance: 35,158; Referee: Tobias Stieler (Germany)

9 October 2021 2022 World Cup qualification	Moldova	0–4	Denmark	Chișinău, Moldova
21:45 UTC+3		Report	Skov Olsen 23'; Kjær 34' (pen.); Nørgaard 39'; Mæhle 44'	Stadium: Zimbru Stadium; Attendance: 2,642; Referee: João Pinheiro (Portugal)

12 October 2021 2022 World Cup qualification	Denmark	1–0	Austria	Copenhagen, Denmark
20:45 UTC+2	Mæhle 53'	Report		Stadium: Parken Stadium; Attendance: 35,843; Referee: Ivan Kružliak (Slovakia)

12 November 2021 2022 World Cup qualification	Denmark	3–1	Faroe Islands	Copenhagen, Denmark
20:45 UTC+1	Skov Olsen 18'; Bruun Larsen 63'; Mæhle 90+3'	Report	K. Olsen 89'	Stadium: Parken Stadium; Attendance: 35,531; Referee: Radu Petrescu (Romania)

15 November 2021 2022 World Cup qualification	Scotland	2–0	Denmark	Glasgow, Scotland
19:45 UTC+0	Souttar 35'; Adams 86'	Report		Stadium: Hampden Park; Attendance: 49,527; Referee: Alejandro Hernández Hernández (Spain)

=== 2022 ===
26 March 2022 Friendly	Netherlands	4–2	Denmark	Amsterdam, Netherlands
20:45 UTC+1	Bergwijn 16', 71'; Aké 29'; Depay 38' (pen.)	Report	Vestergaard 20'; Eriksen 48'	Stadium: Johan Cruyff Arena; Attendance: 39,440; Referee: Lawrence Visser (Belgium)

29 March 2022 Friendly	Denmark	3–0	Serbia	Copenhagen, Denmark
18:00 UTC+2	Mæhle 15'; Lindstrøm 53'; Eriksen 57'	Report		Stadium: Parken Stadium; Attendance: 35,010; Referee: Felix Zwayer (Germany)

3 June 2022 2022–23 Nations League	France	1–2	Denmark	Saint-Denis, France
20:45 UTC+2	Benzema 51'	Report	Cornelius 68', 89'	Stadium: Stade de France; Attendance: 75,833; Referee: Felix Zwayer (Germany)

6 June 2022 2022–23 Nations League	Austria	1–2	Denmark	Vienna, Austria
22:15 UTC+2	Schlager 67'	Report	Højbjerg 28'; Stryger Larsen 84'	Stadium: Ernst-Happel-Stadion; Attendance: 18,700; Referee: Willie Collum (Scotland)
Note: The match was originally scheduled to kick-off at 20:45, but was delayed to 22:15 due to a power outage in the stadium area.

10 June 2022 2022–23 Nations League	Denmark	0–1	Croatia	Copenhagen, Denmark
20:45 UTC+2		Report	Pašalić 69'	Stadium: Parken Stadium; Attendance: 35,862; Referee: Bartosz Frankowski (Poland)

13 June 2022 2022–23 Nations League	Denmark	2–0	Austria	Copenhagen, Denmark
20:45 UTC+2	Wind 21'; Skov Olsen 37'	Report		Stadium: Parken Stadium; Attendance: 35,230; Referee: Alejandro Hernández Hernández (Spain)

22 September 2022 2022–23 Nations League	Croatia	2–1	Denmark	Zagreb, Croatia
20:45 UTC+2	Sosa 49'; Majer 79'	Report	Eriksen 77'	Stadium: Stadion Maksimir; Attendance: 22,715; Referee: Davide Massa (Italy)

25 September 2022 2022–23 Nations League	Denmark	2–0	France	Copenhagen, Denmark
20:45 UTC+2	Dolberg 33'; Skov Olsen 39'	Report		Stadium: Parken Stadium; Attendance: 36,064; Referee: István Kovács (Romania)

22 November 2022 2022 World Cup Group D	Denmark	0–0	Tunisia	Al Rayyan, Qatar
16:00 UTC+3		Report		Stadium: Education City Stadium; Attendance: 42,495; Referee: César Arturo Ramos (Mexico)

26 November 2022 2022 World Cup Group D	France	2–1	Denmark	Doha, Qatar
19:00 UTC+3	Mbappé 61', 86'	Report	A. Christensen 68'	Stadium: Stadium 974; Attendance: 42,860; Referee: Szymon Marciniak (Poland)

30 November 2022 2022 World Cup Group D	Australia	1–0	Denmark	Al Wakrah, Qatar
18:00 UTC+3	Leckie 60'	Report		Stadium: Al Janoub Stadium; Attendance: 41,232; Referee: Mustapha Ghorbal (Algeria)

=== 2023 ===
23 March 2023 Euro 2024 qualifying	Denmark	3–1	Finland	Copenhagen, Denmark
20:45 CET	Højlund 21', 82', 90+3'	Report	Antman 54'	Stadium: Parken Stadium; Attendance: 35,851; Referee: Daniel Siebert (Germany)

26 March 2023 Euro 2024 qualifying	Kazakhstan	3–2	Denmark	Astana, Kazakhstan
15:00 CET	Zaynutdinov 73' (pen.); Tagybergen 86'; Aymbetov 89'	Report	Højlund 21', 36'	Stadium: Astana Arena; Attendance: 28,697; Referee: Novak Simović (Serbia)

16 June 2023 Euro 2024 qualifying	Denmark	1–0	Northern Ireland	Copenhagen, Denmark
20:45 CEST	Wind 47'	Report		Stadium: Parken; Attendance: 35,701; Referee: Daniel Stefański (Poland)

19 June 2023 Euro 2024 qualifying	Slovenia	1–1	Denmark	Ljubljana, Slovenia
20:45 CEST	Šporar 25'	Report	Højlund 42'	Stadium: Stožice Stadium; Attendance: 14,382; Referee: François Letexier (France)

7 September 2023 Euro 2024 qualifying	Denmark	4–0	San Marino	Copenhagen, Denmark
20:45 CEST	Højbjerg 26'; Mæhle 28'; Wind 40'; Eriksen 90+3'	Report		Stadium: Parken; Attendance: 36,262; Referee: Vitālijs Spasjoņņikovs (Latvia)

10 September 2023 Euro 2024 qualifying	Finland	0–1	Denmark	Helsinki, Finland
18:00 CEST		Report	Højbjerg 86'	Stadium: Helsinki Olympic Stadium; Attendance: 32,571; Referee: Szymon Marciniak (Poland)

14 October 2023 Euro 2024 qualifying	Denmark	3–1	Kazakhstan	Copenhagen, Denmark
20:45 CEST	Wind 36'; Skov 45+1', 48'	Report	Vorogovskiy 58'	Stadium: Parken; Attendance: 35,845; Referee: Michael Oliver (England)

17 October 2023 Euro 2024 qualifying	San Marino	1–2	Denmark	Serravalle, San Marino
20:45 CEST	Kjær 61' (o.g.)	Report	Højlund 42'; Yurary 70'	Stadium: Stadio Olimpico de Serravalle; Attendance: 2,984; Referee: Viktor Kopiievskyi (Ukraine)

17 November 2023 Euro 2024 qualifying	Denmark	2–1	Slovenia	Copenhagen, Denmark
20:45 CET	Mæhle 26'; Delaney 54'	Report	Janža 30'	Stadium: Parken; Attendance: 35,608; Referee: José María Sánchez Martínez (Spain)

20 November 2023 Euro 2024 qualifying	Northern Ireland	2–0	Denmark	Belfast, Northern Ireland
20:45 CET	Price 60'; Charles 81'	Report		Stadium: Windsor Park; Attendance: 17,366; Referee: Jérôme Brisard (France)

=== 2024 ===
23 March 2024 Friendly	Denmark	0–0	Switzerland	Copenhagen, Denmark
20:00 UTC+1		Report		Stadium: Parken Stadium; Attendance: 30,731; Referee: Allard Lindhout (Netherlands)

26 March 2024 Friendly	Denmark	2–0	Faroe Islands	Brøndby, Denmark
20:15 UTC+1	Højbjerg 8'; Daramy 52'			Stadium: Brøndby Stadium; Attendance: 17,332; Referee: Philip Farrugia (Malta)

5 June 2024 Friendly	Denmark	2–1	Sweden	Copenhagen, Denmark
19:00 UTC+2	Højbjerg 2'; Eriksen 86'	Report	Isak 9'	Stadium: Parken Stadium; Attendance: 35,522; Referee: Kristoffer Hagenes (Norway)

8 June 2024 Friendly	Denmark	3–1	Norway	Brøndby, Denmark
19:30 UTC+2	Højbjerg 12'; Vestergaard 21'; Poulsen 90'	Report	Haaland 72'	Stadium: Brøndby Stadium; Attendance: 23,390; Referee: Stéphanie Frappart (France)

16 June 2024 Euro 2024 Group C	Slovenia	1–1	Denmark	Stuttgart, Germany
18:00 CEST	Janža 77'	Report	Eriksen 17'	Stadium: MHPArena; Attendance: 54,000; Referee: Sandro Schärer (Switzerland)

20 June 2024 Euro 2024 Group C	Denmark	1–1	England	Frankfurt, Germany
18:00 CEST	Hjulmand 34'	Report	Kane 18'	Stadium: Waldstadion; Attendance: 46,177; Referee: Artur Soares Dias (Portugal)

25 June 2024 Euro 2024 Group C	Denmark	0–0	Serbia	Munich, Germany
21:00 CEST		Report		Stadium: Allianz Arena; Attendance: 64,288; Referee: François Letexier (France)

29 June 2024 Euro 2024 R16	Germany	2–0	Denmark	Dortmund, Germany
21:00 UTC+2	Havertz 53' (pen.); Musiala 68'	Report		Stadium: Westfalenstadion; Attendance: 61,612; Referee: Michael Oliver (England)

5 September 2024 2024–25 Nations League	Denmark	2–0	Switzerland	Copenhagen, Denmark
20:45 CEST	Dorgu 82'; Højbjerg 90+2'	Report		Stadium: Parken Stadium; Attendance: 26,024; Referee: Daniel Siebert (Germany)

8 September 2024 2024–25 Nations League	Denmark	2–0	Serbia	Copenhagen, Denmark
18:00 CEST	Grønbæk 36'; Yurary 61'	Report		Stadium: Parken Stadium; Attendance: 34,902; Referee: Chris Kavanagh (England)

12 October 2024 2024–25 Nations League	Spain	1–0	Denmark	Murcia, Spain
20:45 CEST	Zubimendi 79'	Report		Stadium: Estadio Nueva Condomina; Attendance: 29,870; Referee: Ivan Kružliak (Slovakia)

15 October 2024 2024–25 Nations League	Switzerland	2–2	Denmark	St. Gallen, Switzerland
20:45 CEST	Freuler 26'; Amdouni 45+1' (pen.)	Report	Isaksen 27'; Eriksen 69'	Stadium: Kybunpark; Attendance: 16,182; Referee: Halil Umut Meler (Turkey)

15 November 2024 2024–25 Nations League	Denmark	1–2	Spain	Copenhagen, Denmark
20:45 CET	Isaksen 84'	Report	Oyarzabal 15'; Pérez 58'	Stadium: Parken Stadium; Attendance: 36,985; Referee: Rade Obrenović (Slovenia)

18 November 2024 2024–25 Nations League	Serbia	0–0	Denmark	Leskovac, Serbia
20:45 CET		Report		Stadium: Dubočica Stadium; Attendance: 7,295; Referee: Felix Zwayer (Germany)

=== 2025 ===
20 March 2025 2024–25 Nations League QF	Denmark	1–0	Portugal	Copenhagen, Denmark
20:45 CET	Højlund 78'	Report		Stadium: Parken Stadium; Attendance: 36,322; Referee: Irfan Peljto (Bosnia and Herzegovina)

23 March 2025 2024–25 Nations League QF	Portugal	5–2 (a.e.t.) (5–3 agg.)	Denmark	Lisbon, Portugal
19:45 WET	Andersen 38' (o.g.); Ronaldo 72'; Trincão 86', 91'; Ramos 115'	Report	Kristensen 56'; Eriksen 76'	Stadium: Estádio José Alvalade; Attendance: 47,123; Referee: Slavko Vinčić (Slovenia)

7 June 2025 Friendly	Denmark	2–1	Northern Ireland	Copenhagen, Denmark
19:00 CEST	Isaksen 45+2'; Eriksen 67'	Report	P. Højbjerg 6' (o.g.)	Stadium: Parken Stadium; Attendance: 22,151; Referee: Antoniou Menelaos (Cyprus)

10 June 2025 Friendly	Denmark	5–0	Lithuania	Odense, Denmark
19:00 CEST	Biereth 12'; Eriksen 18'; Dolberg 23'; Kristensen 48'; Dreyer 62'	Report		Stadium: Odense Stadium; Attendance: 13,087; Referee: Rohit Saggi (Norway)

5 September 2025 2026 World Cup qualification	Denmark	0–0	Scotland	Copenhagen, Denmark
20:45 CEST		Report		Stadium: Parken Stadium; Attendance: 35,369; Referee: Daniel Siebert (Germany)

8 September 2025 2026 World Cup qualification	Greece	0–3	Denmark	Piraeus, Greece
21:45 EEST		Report	Damsgaard 32'; Christensen 62'; Højlund 81'	Stadium: Karaiskakis Stadium; Attendance: 31,172; Referee: Donatas Rumšas (Lithuania)

9 October 2025 2026 World Cup qualification	Belarus	0–6	Denmark	Zalaegerszeg, Hungary
20:45 CEST		Report	Froholdt 14'; Højlund 19', 45'; Dorgu 45+6'; Dreyer 66', 78'	Stadium: ZTE Arena; Attendance: 0 Referee: Filip Glova (Slovakia)
Note: Due to the Belarusian involvement in the Russian invasion of Ukraine, Belarus are required to play their home matches at neutral venues and behind closed doors.

12 October 2025 2026 World Cup qualification	Denmark	3–1	Greece	Copenhagen, Denmark
20:45 CEST	Højlund 21'; Andersen 40'; Damsgaard 41'	Report	Tzolis 63'	Stadium: Parken Stadium; Attendance: 35,623; Referee: Michael Oliver (England)

15 November 2025 2026 World Cup qualification	Denmark	2–2	Belarus	Copenhagen, Denmark
20:45 CET	Damsgaard 11'; Isaksen 79'	Report	Hramyka 62'; Dziemchanka 65'	Stadium: Parken Stadium; Attendance: 35,493; Referee: Sven Jablonski (Germany)

18 November 2025 2026 World Cup qualification	Scotland	4–2	Denmark	Glasgow, Scotland
19:45 GMT	McTominay 3'; Shankland 78'; Tierney 90+3'; McLean 90+8'	Report	Højlund 57' (pen.); Dorgu 81'	Stadium: Hampden Park; Attendance: 49,587; Referee: Szymon Marciniak (Poland)

=== 2026 ===
26 March 2026 2026 World Cup qualification play-offs	Denmark	4–0	North Macedonia	Copenhagen, Denmark
20:45 CET	Damsgaard 50'; Isaksen 58', 59'; Nørgaard 75'	Report		Stadium: Parken Stadium; Attendance: 35,746; Referee: Felix Zwayer (Germany)

31 March 2026 2026 World Cup qualification play-offs	Czech Republic	2–2 (a.e.t.) (3–1 p)	Denmark	Prague, Czech Republic
20:45 CEST or 19:45 BST	Šulc 3'; Krejčí 100'	Report	Andersen 72'; Høgh 111'	Stadium: Fortuna Arena; Attendance: 18,215; Referee: Maurizio Mariani (Italy)
	Penalties
	Chorý (penalty scored); Souček (penalty scored); Krejčí (penalty missed); Sadílek (penalty scored)		(penalty missed) Højlund; (penalty scored) Eriksen; (penalty missed) Dreyer; (penalty missed) Jensen

3 June 2026 Friendly	Denmark	0–0	DR Congo	Liège, Belgium
20:00 UTC+2		Report		Stadium: Stade Maurice Dufrasne; Attendance: 23,043; Referee: Lothar D'Hondt (Belgium)

7 June 2026 Friendly	Denmark	2–1 (Abandoned)	Ukraine	Odense, Denmark
18:30 UTC+2	Dorgu 13'; Mæhle 36'	Report	Tsyhankov 44'	Stadium: Odense Stadium; Attendance: 12,017; Referee: Sigurd Kringstad (Norway)
Note: The match was abandoned after the 79th minute, following Denmark midfielder Christian Eriksen suffering an on-field collapse.

24 September 2026 2026–27 Nations League	Norway	3–2	Denmark	Oslo, Norway
20:45 UTC+2	Bobb 14'; Haaland 18', 74'	Report	Damsgaard 25'; Højlund 60'	Stadium: Ullevaal Stadion; Attendance: 25,002; Referee: Tobias Stieler (Germany)

27 September 2026 2026–27 Nations League	Denmark	2–0	Wales	Copenhagen, Denmark
18:00 UTC+2	B. Davies 53' (o.g.); Isaksen 66'	Report		Stadium: Parken Stadium; Attendance: 34,588; Referee: Willy Delajod (France)

1 October 2026 2026–27 Nations League	Denmark	2–4	Portugal	Copenhagen, Denmark
20:45 UTC+2	Damsgaard 23'; Højlund 53'	Report	João Cancelo 13'; Gonçalo Ramos 25'; Vitinha 67'; João Félix 87'	Stadium: Parken Stadium; Attendance: 35,951; Referee: Mykola Balakin (Ukraine)

4 October 2026 2026–27 Nations League	Wales	0–1	Denmark	Cardiff, Wales
19:45 UTC+1		Report	Højlund 75' (pen.)	Stadium: Cardiff City Stadium; Attendance: 25,108; Referee: Irfan Peljto (Bosnia and Herzegovina)

14 November 2026 2026–27 Nations League	Portugal	1–4	Denmark	Braga, Portugal
19:45 UTC+0	Silva 90+3'	Report	Højbjerg 43' (pen.); Højlund 50', 57'; Andersen 75'	Stadium: Estádio Municipal de Braga; Attendance: 24,879; Referee: Rade Obrenovič (Slovenia)

17 November 2026 2026–27 Nations League	Denmark	2–3	Norway	Copenhagen, Denmark
20:45 UTC+1	Højlund 11'; Højbjerg 14'	Report	Haaland 37', 90+6' (pen.); Ødegaard 83'	Stadium: Parken Stadium; Attendance: 36,047; Referee: Halil Umut Meler (Turkey)

== Forthcoming fixtures ==
The following match is scheduled:

== Head to head records ==
As of 17 November 2026

Head to head records
Opponent	P	W	D	L	GF	GA	W%	D%	L%
Australia	1	0	0	1	0	1	0	0	100
Austria	4	4	0	0	9	1	100	0	0
Belarus	2	1	1	0	8	2	50	50	0
Belgium	3	0	0	3	3	8	0	0	100
Bosnia and Herzegovina	1	1	0	0	2	0	100	0	0
Croatia	2	0	0	2	1	3	0	0	100
Czech Republic	2	1	1	0	4	2	50	50	0
DR Congo	1	0	1	0	0	0	0	100	0
England	4	1	2	1	3	3	25	50	25
Faroe Islands	4	4	0	0	10	1	100	0	0
Finland	3	2	0	1	4	2	66.67	0	33.33
France	3	2	0	1	5	3	66.67	0	33.33
Germany	2	0	1	1	1	3	0	50	50
Greece	2	2	0	0	6	1	100	0	0
Iceland	2	2	0	0	5	1	100	0	0
Israel	2	2	0	0	7	0	100	0	0
Kazakhstan	2	1	0	1	5	4	50	0	50
Lithuania	1	1	0	0	5	0	100	0	100
Moldova	2	2	0	0	12	0	100	0	0
Norway	3	1	0	2	7	7	33.33	0	33.33
Netherlands	1	0	0	1	2	4	0	0	100
Northern Ireland	3	2	0	1	3	3	50	0	50
North Macedonia	1	1	0	0	4	0	100	0	0
Portugal	4	2	0	2	9	10	50	0	50
Russia	1	1	0	0	4	1	100	0	0
San Marino	2	2	0	0	6	1	100	0	0
Scotland	4	1	1	2	4	6	25	25	25
Serbia	4	2	2	0	5	0	50	50	0
Slovenia	3	1	2	0	4	3	33.33	66.67	0
Spain	2	0	0	2	1	3	0	0	100
Sweden	2	2	0	0	4	1	100	0	0
Switzerland	3	1	2	0	4	2	33.33	66.67	0
Tunisia	1	0	1	0	0	0	0	100	0
Ukraine	1	1	0	0	2	1	100	0	0
Wales	3	3	0	0	7	0	100	0	0
Totals	81	46	14	21	156	77	56.79	17.28	25.93

=== FIFA Top 20 ===
As of 8 September 2025

The table shows Denmark's results against any team ranked in the FIFA Top 20 since 2020.

Head to head records
Opponent	P	W	D	L	GF	GA	W%	D%	L%
Belgium	3	0	0	3	3	8	0	0	100
Croatia	2	0	0	2	1	3	0	0	100
England	4	1	2	1	3	3	25	50	25
France	3	2	0	1	5	3	66.67	0	33.33
Germany	2	0	1	1	1	3	0	50	50
Netherlands	1	0	0	1	2	4	0	0	100
Norway	3	1	0	2	7	7	33.33	0	33.33
Portugal	4	2	0	2	9	10	50	0	50
Spain	2	0	0	2	1	3	0	0	100
Sweden	2	2	0	0	4	1	100	0	0
Switzerland	3	1	2	0	4	2	33.33	66.67	0
Wales	3	3	0	0	7	0	100	0	0
Totals	32	12	5	15	47	47	37.5	15.63	46.88
