= Torben Nielsen =

Danish footballer and manager

Personal information
- Full name: Torben Nielsen
- Date of birth: 7 December 1945 (age 80)
- Place of birth: Frederiksberg, Denmark
- Position: Defender

Senior career*
| Years | Team | Apps | (Gls) |
| 1964–1972 | B 1903 | | |
| 1972–1974 | 1. FSV Mainz 05 | | |
| 1974–1976 | FK Pirmasens | 76 | (3) |
| 197?–197? | Helsingborgs IF | | |
| 1980 | Hillerød G&IF | | |

International career
| 1968 | Denmark U-21 | 2 | (0) |
| 1969–1972 | Denmark | 26 | (0) |

Managerial career
- 1980: Hillerød G&IF (player coach)
- 1981–1982: Kastrup BK
- * Club domestic league appearances and goals

Torben Nielsen (born 7 December 1945) is a Danish former football player and manager. He was a defender, and played 26 games for the Denmark national football team.

Born in Copenhagen, he started his career with B 1903 and made his debut for the Danish national team in May 1969. In 1972, he signed a professional contract with German club 1. FSV Mainz 05 in the Regionalliga Südwest league. As a professional, he missed participation with Denmark at the 1972 Summer Olympics, and played his last national team game in October 1972. In 1974, he moved to German 2nd Bundesliga South club FK Pirmasens, where he played 76 games and scored three goals as a midfielder until 1976. He ended his footballing career with Helsingborgs IF in Sweden. He moved to the Danish club Hillerød G&IF, playing the lower regional levels, SBU Series 1, as a player coach during the fall season of 1980, before being signed as a coach on 1 January 1981 for Kastrup Boldklub. Nielsen aborted a managerial career after being fired by Kastrup Boldklub, and settled at Helsingborg.
