= Jens Peter Hansen =

Danish footballer (1927-1996)

Personal information
- Full name: Jens Peter Hansen
- Date of birth: 15 March 1927
- Place of birth: Esbjerg, Denmark
- Date of death: 16 November 1996 (aged 69)
- Place of death: Esbjerg, Denmark
- Positions: Left winger; centre-forward

Senior career*
Years	Team	Apps	(Gls)
1943–1966	Esbjerg fB	465	(150)

International career
1946–1949	Denmark U21	2	(1)
1952–1960	Denmark B	3	(3)
1949–1961	Denmark	38	(18)
- * Club domestic league appearances and goals

Jens Peter Hansen, alternatively spelled Jens Peder Hansen (15 March 1927 – 16 November 1996) was a Danish footballer who played 465 games and scored 150 goals for Esbjerg fB in Denmark. He was the top goalscorer of the 1951 Danish football championship, and played 38 games and scored 18 goals for the Denmark national football team. He represented Denmark at the 1952 Summer Olympics. He also played for the Denmark national under-21 football team.

== Club career ==
Hansen made his first-team debut as a 16-year-old, and would go on to play continuously for the club's first team for more than 22 years and achieve the unusual feat of playing alongside his son, Jørgen Peter Hansen, who made 37 appearances for the club between in the period 1964 and 1969.

In total, Hansen made 465 appearances between 1942 and 1966, in which he scored 150 goals for Esbjerg fB, and is only surpassed in terms of number of matches by Ole Kjær (474 matches) and in number of goals only by Michael Pedersen (159 goals). Hansen experienced helping to bring home the club's first Danish Championship in 1961, where at age 34 he was ten years older than the team's second oldest player. Hansen had an important share when the championship had to be decided in the last round away against Køge Boldklub. Esbjerg had to win the match to become champions. Køge took the 1–0 lead, but Hansen later scored directly from a corner kick, and Esbjerg ended up winning 2–1.

He also won the championship in 1962, 1963 and 1965 as well as the Danish Cup in 1964.

Hansen never went abroad to play professionally despite receiving offers from Sampdoria and Hull City. (Note: Professionalism (then referred to as betalt fodbold) in Danish football was only introduced in 1978.) After ending his active career, he joined Esbjerg's veteran team on several occasions to play matches in Canada, where a Danish emigrant who had seen Hansen play in his heyday, invited the team – with everything paid for – to come to his new homeland, provided that Jens Peder Hansen joined.

== International career ==
Hansen gained two caps for Denmark U21 team after World War II, after which he made his senior debut for Denmark in August 1949 in Aarhus against Iceland, who played their first international away game and thus also their first game on a grass pitch. 22-year-old Hansen played centre-forward and scored two goals in the match, which Denmark won 5–1.

He first played his final international match twelve years later and would during his national team career, among others, participate at the 1952 Summer Olympics in Helsinki, where he played all three matches. Hansen managed to play all five attacking positions for the national team in a period where the game was played after a fairly fixed system. He gained 38 caps from 1949 to 1961 and scored 18 goals.

== Style of play ==
Hansen was known for his narrow, fast moves and his unpredictable dribbling. He was a mood player who in his best days was difficult to control. Although he was distinctly right-footed, he mostly played on the left side, often cutting inside to score. Noted for his entertaining style, he was a popular figure also among opposing fans. In 1962, Hansen was apparently bored during a match against AB, and suddenly he left the pitch to buy a sausage by the hot dog stand, whereupon he came back and played on – to the great amusement of the audience and the coach's corresponding anger.

== Outside football ==
Besides football, Hansen first worked as a depot worker at DSB, then as a municipal worker in Esbjerg Sports Park and later a driver. In 1962, he wrote the book Kom Så Jens Peder.

At the end of his life, Jens Peder Hansen was the coach of Esbjerg IF 92. He died on 16 November 1996.
