= Aage Rou Jensen =

Danish footballer (1924–2009)

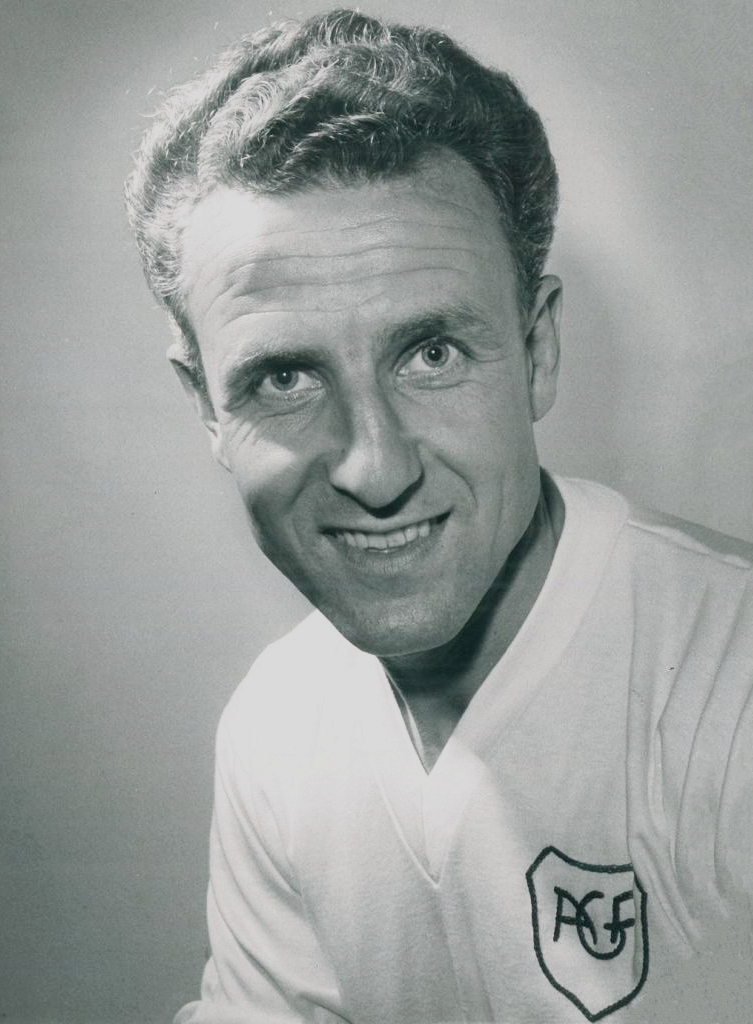

Personal information
- Full name: Aage Rou Jensen
- Date of birth: 24 September 1924
- Place of birth: Aarhus, Denmark
- Date of death: 8 June 2009 (aged 84)
- Place of death: Aarhus, Denmark
- Position: Striker

Senior career*
Years	Team	Apps	(Gls)
1941–1962	AGF	410	(89)

International career
1945	Denmark U21	1	(0)
1952–1957	Denmark B	7	(2)
1945–1957	Denmark	30	(11)

Managerial career
- AGF
- * Club domestic league appearances and goals

Aage Rou Jensen (24 September 1924 – 8 June 2009) was a Danish international footballer who played over 400 times for AGF. He was a reserve member of the Danish squad at the 1952 Summer Olympics. He later became manager of AGF.
