= Knud Lundberg =

Danish sportsperson (1920–2002)

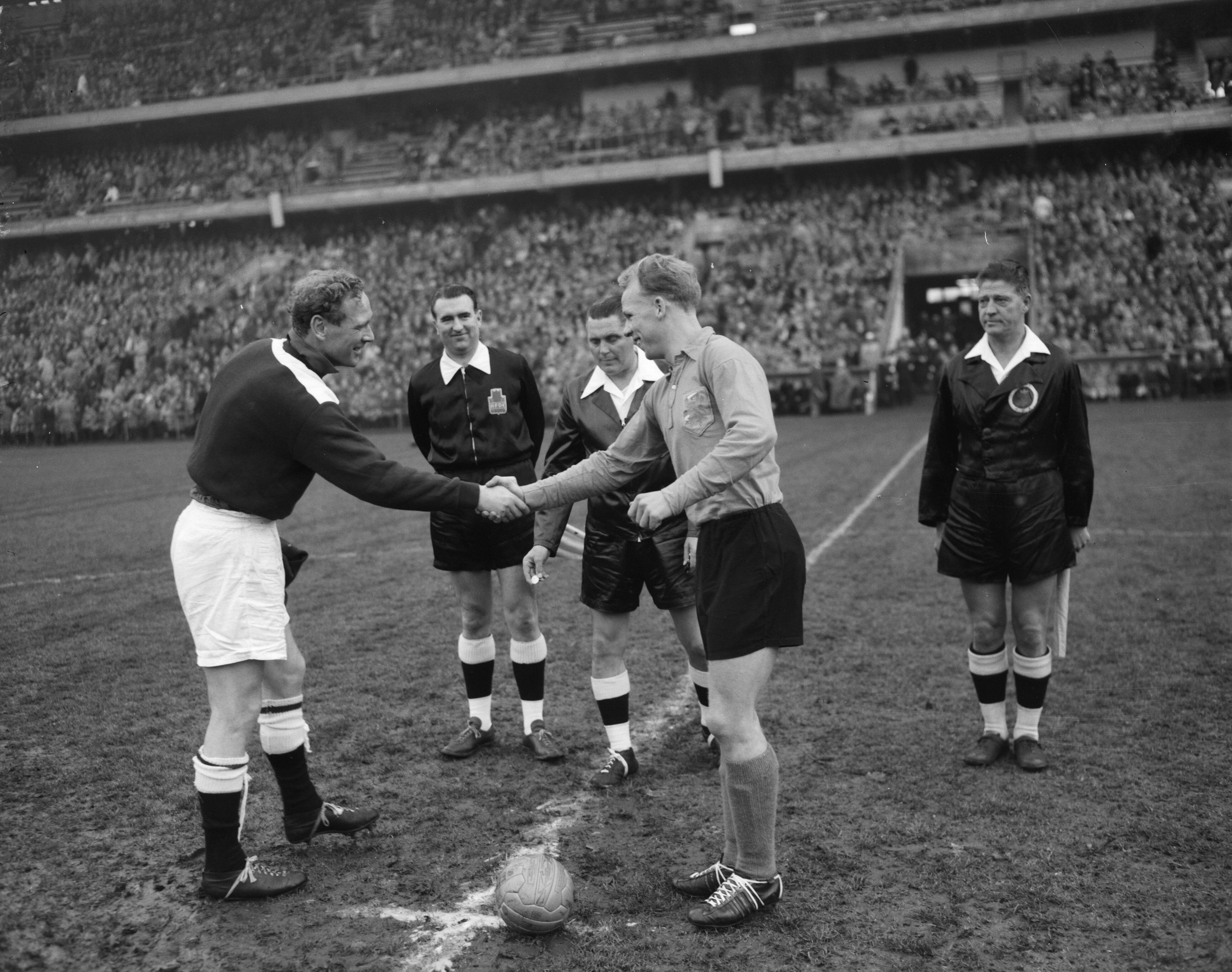
- Lundberg (1956)
- Born: 14 May 1920; Copenhagen, Denmark
- Died: 12 August 2002 (aged 82); Gentofte
Association football career
- Position: Forward
Senior career*
Years	Team	Apps	(Gls)
1939–1959	AB		
International career
1944–1956	Denmark	38	(10)
Managerial career
- 1971: AB
- * Club domestic league appearances and goals
Handball career
- Sport: Handball

Senior clubs
- Years: Team
- –: Handelsstandens Gymnastikforening
National team
Years	Team	Apps	(Gls)
1940–1956	Denmark	23	(26)
- Updated on 12 June 2020

Career history
- 1950–1953: Denmark 18 (74 points)

Basketball career

Medal record

Men's football

Representing Denmark

Olympic Games
Bronze medal – third place	1948 London	Team competition

Knud Lundberg (14 May 1920 – 12 August 2002) was a Danish multi-talented sportsperson, who most notably won a bronze medal with the Denmark national football team at the 1948 Summer Olympics. He represented the Denmark national team in football, handball and basketball, and he won the Danish national championship in all three disciplines. He played his footballing career at Akademisk Boldklub.

In his civil life, Lundberg studied medicine and sports. Along with his athletic career, Lundberg worked as a sports journalist, and he was the first sports editor at the Danish newspaper Dagbladet Information, a sports editor at the social democratic newspaper Aktuelt, editor of the annual Fodbold Jul are among his other editorial posts. After ending his sporting career, he, among other things, was a social democratic regional politician and a writer. The number of books written solely by Lundberg or teaming up with other writers adds up to more than 50 with themes ranging from health to sports and fiction. His writings included the four-volume Dansk Fodbold; a chronicle of Danish football from 1939 to 1989, published for the 100th anniversary of the Danish Football Association.

In the last years of his life, Lundberg suffered from Alzheimer's disease.
