= Frank Arnesen =

Danish footballer (born 1956)

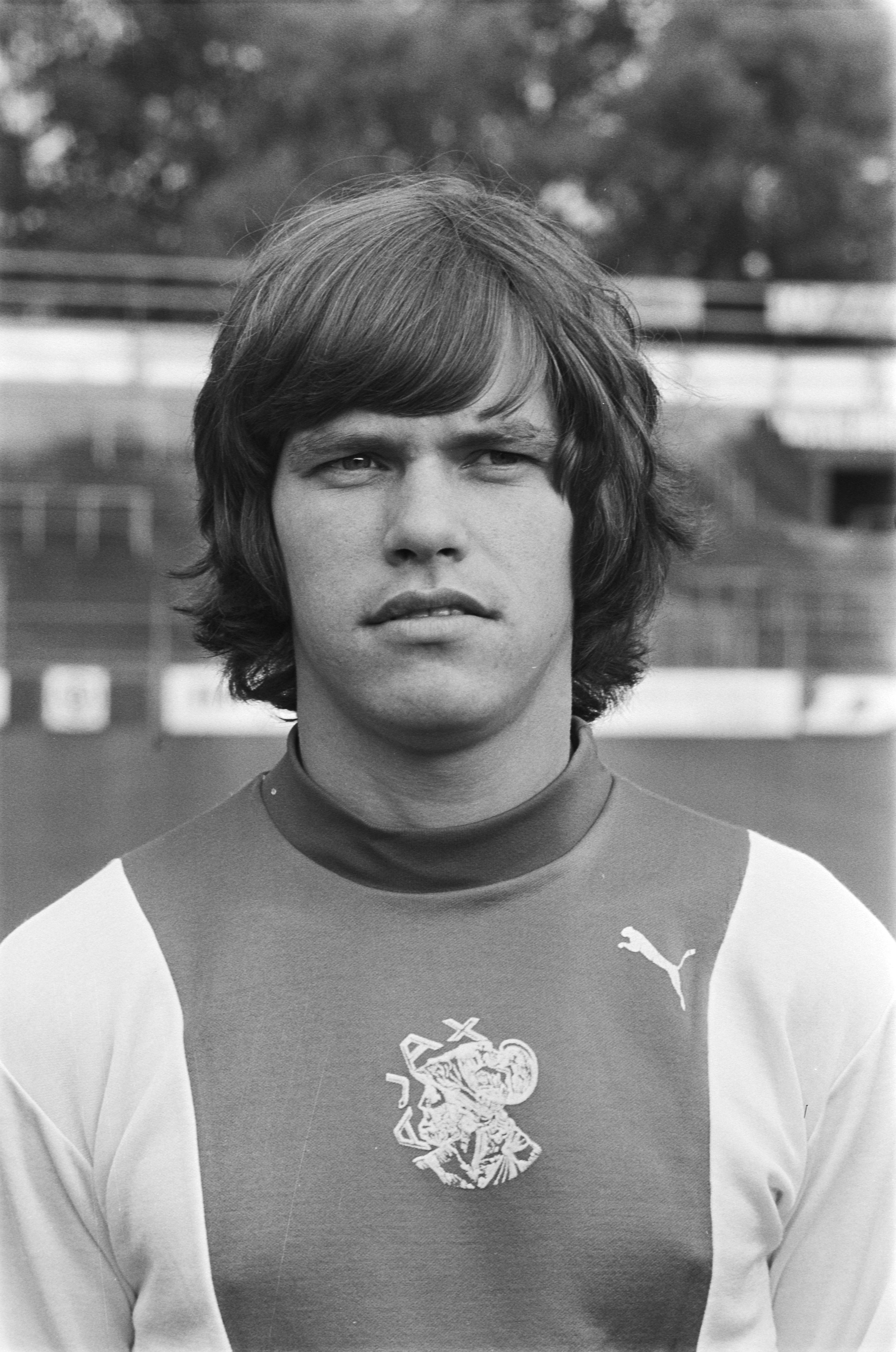
- Arnesen playing for Ajax Amsterdam in the 1978–79-season

Personal information
- Date of birth: 30 September 1956 (age 70)
- Place of birth: Copenhagen, Denmark
- Height: 1.81 m (5 ft 11 in)
- Position: Midfielder

Youth career
- 1974–1975: Fremad Amager

Senior career*
Years	Team	Apps	(Gls)
1975–1981	Ajax	209	(75)
1981–1983	Valencia	32	(13)
1983–1985	Anderlecht	50	(15)
1985–1988	PSV	55	(11)
Total		346	(114)

International career
1973	Denmark U17	1	(1)
1973–1975	Denmark U19	13	(4)
1975–1976	Denmark U21	4	(0)
1977–1987	Denmark	52	(14)
- * Club domestic league appearances and goals

Frank Arnesen (born 30 September 1956) is a Danish former footballer and football director. Arnesen was the director of football at English football clubs Tottenham Hotspur and Chelsea, and was sporting director at Hamburger SV, Metalist Kharkiv, PAOK and Feyenoord.

As a player, he most notably played with Dutch clubs Ajax and PSV Eindhoven, winning the 1988 European Cup with PSV. Arnesen was capped 52 times and scored 14 goals for the Danish national team, and participated in the Euro 1984 and 1986 FIFA World Cup tournaments.

== Playing career ==
Arnesen moved from his childhood club Fremad Amager, in the lower leagues of Danish football, to the big Dutch team Ajax in November/December 1975. At the time he was only 19, and made the move together with Fremad Amager teammate Søren Lerby, who was only 17. Arnesen got his debut with Ajax three or four months later, on 7 March 1976, in a 1–1 draw with Utrecht. It was also in his time at Ajax that Arnesen debuted for the Danish national team, in a 1977 friendly 1–0 loss against Sweden, in Malmö. In Arnesen's six seasons at Ajax, he won three Dutch Eredivisie championship titles in 1977, 1979, and 1980, and won the KNVB Cup in 1979, beating Twente 3–0 in the final. In 1978, 1980 and 1981, Ajax also reached the KNVB Cup finals, but lost. In 1980, Arnesen and Ajax reached the semi-final of the European Cup, before they were eliminated by English team Nottingham Forest, the European Cup winners in the 1978-1979 and 1979–1980 seasons (2–0 away loss, 1–0 home win, 31 goals for and eight goals against in the 1979-80 tournament).

In the summer of 1981, Arnesen was bought by the Spanish football club Valencia, and two years later he went to Belgium to play for Anderlecht. In November 1985, Arnesen returned to the Netherlands to play for Ajax' rivals PSV Eindhoven. Here, he saw three extremely successful seasons, winning the Eredivisie three consecutive seasons (1986, 1987 and 1988), with fellow Danes Jan Heintze, Søren Lerby and Ivan Nielsen. Arnesen stopped his international career in 1987, after the Danish team qualified for the Euro 1988. In 1988, he won the KNVB Cup once more, and he was part of the PSV team that conquered the European Cup, though he did not play in the final match due to an injury.

== Management career ==
After his active career, Arnesen was first appointed assistant coach at PSV under Bobby Robson from 1991 to 1993, and in 1994 he became the club's general manager. Arnesen spent ten years as director of football at PSV Eindhoven, and was credited with discovering major talents, such as Brazilian striker Ronaldo and Dutch players Jaap Stam, Ruud van Nistelrooy and Arjen Robben. In May 2004, Arnesen was brought to Tottenham Hotspur, replacing David Pleat. Arnesen was to function as the manager responsible for player transfers and scouting for new talent, while coach Jacques Santini handled the daily training sessions and match setups - an arrangement identical to Arnesen's days as PSV manager. Things did not work out well, and Santini left within months, citing "personal problems" as his reason for leaving. Arnesen's original hire for assistant coach, Martin Jol, was put in charge of the club.

Arnesen was suspended by Spurs on 4 June 2005 for expressing a desire to move to rival club Chelsea, after Chelsea allegedly made an illegal approach to sign him as manager. Arnesen was photographed aboard one of Roman Abramovich's three luxury yachts on 22 June 2005, thus reinforcing Tottenham's compensation claim. Arnesen was recommended to Abramovich by Piet de Visser. Later on, one of the reasons to end José Mourinho's contract would have been that Mourinho did not want to engage with Abramovich's football consultants. On 24 June, both clubs announced that they had reached a financial settlement, later disclosed to be £5 million, but widely reported to be closer to £8 million, and Arnesen would move to Chelsea, filling in the role of head talent scout, in charge of discovering footballing talents. Arnesen has since played a key role in bringing Salomon Kalou, Florent Malouda and Mikel John Obi to Chelsea. But the club has still pursued expensive purchases of established international players, rather than unearthing and developing young talent as hoped. On 27 November 2010, Chelsea announced that Arnesen had resigned as sporting director, and would be leaving the club at the end of the 2010–11 season. On 20 February, he decided to join Hamburger SV for the foreseeable future as sporting director, instead of returning to Ajax.

As sporting director of Hamburg, Arnesen took Chelsea youngsters to Hamburg like Jacopo Sala, Michael Mancienne, Gökhan Töre, Slobodan Rajković (all permanent) and Jeffrey Bruma (on loan). On 10 October 2011, Arnesen took over the additional task of the head coach of Hamburger SV for just one match, before hiring and installing a permanent new coach with Thorsten Fink.

On 22 May 2013, Hamburg confirmed that Arnesen had agreed to depart from his role as sporting director at the club. Arnesen was with the club for two years, including a spell as interim manager.

On 30 January 2014, Metalist Kharkiv announced that Arnesen will take over the role of sporting director from 1 February 2014. This position was only held for a month, as Arnesen and Metalist agreed that Arnesen could leave the club, due to the ongoing violent political situation in Ukraine.

Speaking on the official Metalist Kharkiv website, Arnesen said:

"I want to thank everyone in "Metalist". I got acquainted with all staff during this short period and realized that true professionals and very nice people work in the club. Also I would like to apologize to the fans, but the circumstances were stronger than me. The situation in Ukraine forced me to make this choice. I want to wish everyone at Metalist and throughout the Ukraine all the best in these difficult times".

On 27 May 2015, PAOK announced that Arnesen would be the new sporting director of the club for the next three years. After nine months, it was announced that his contract was terminated.

== Honours ==
Ajax

- Eredivisie: 1976–77, 1978–79, 1979–80
- KNVB Cup: 1978–79

Anderlecht

- Belgian First Division A: 1984–85
- UEFA Cup: 1983–84 (runners-up)
- Jules Pappaert Cup: 1983, 1985

PSV

- Eredivisie: 1985–86, 1986–87, 1987–88
- KNVB Cup: 1987–88
- European Cup: 1987–88

Individual

- UEFA Euro Team of the Tournament: 1984
- Danish Football Hall of Fame: Inductee

== See also ==
- AFC Ajax-PSV Eindhoven rivalry
- Big Three (Netherlands)

Sporting positions
Preceded by David Pleat	Tottenham Hotspur F.C. Director of Football; 2004–2005	Succeeded by Damien Comolli
