= 1952–55 Nordic Football Championship =

Tournament details
- Host countries: Denmark; Finland; Norway; Sweden
- Dates: 22 June 1952 – 16 October 1955
- Teams: 4

Final positions
- Champions: Sweden (4th title)
- Runners-up: Norway
- Third place: Denmark
- Fourth place: Finland

Tournament statistics
- Matches played: 24
- Goals scored: 105 (4.38 per match)
- Top scorer(s): (Sweden) Nils-Åke Sandell (10 goals)

The 1952–55 Nordic Football Championship was the sixth tournament staged. Four Nordic countries participated: Denmark, Finland, Norway and Sweden. Sweden won the tournament, its fourth Nordic Championship win.

== Results ==
=== 1952 ===
22 June 1952
15:00 (UTC+1:00)

Sweden	4-3	Denmark
Bengtsson 5'; Brodd 8'; Sandell 19', 76'	Report	Rasmussen 52'; Petersen 59'; Seebach 77'

Råsunda Stadium, Stockholm
Attendance: 36,700
Referee: Edvin Pedersen (Norway)
31 August 1952
13:15 (UTC+1:00)

Norway	7-2	Finland
Thoresen 18', 55'; Kristiansen 36', 47', 75'; Sørensen 70', 85'	Report	Lehtovirta 16'; Rikberg 80'

Ullevaal Stadion, Oslo
Attendance: 24,025
Referee: John Nilsson (Sweden)
21 September 1952
14:00 (UTC+2:00)

Finland	1-8	Sweden
Råberg 10', 48', 58'; Persson 24', 50', 83'; Sandin 25'; Sandberg 70'	Report	Pelkonen 51'

Olympic Stadium, Helsinki
Attendance: 20,132
Referee: Edvin Pedersen (Norway)
5 October 1952
14:00 (UTC+2:00)

Finland	2-1	Denmark
Rikberg 18'; Rytkönen 71'	Report	Jensen 64'

Olympic Stadium, Helsinki
Attendance: 9,022
Referee: Erik Westman (Sweden)
5 October 1952
13:15 (UTC+1:00)

Norway	1-2	Sweden
Johannessen 42'; Persson 73'	Report	Jacobsson 32'

Ullevaal Stadion, Oslo
Attendance: 36,458
Referee: Leo Helge (Denmark)
19 October 1952
13:30 (UTC+1:00)

Denmark	1-3	Norway
Jensen 57'	Report	Sørensen 19'; Nordahl 61'; Jevne 77'

Idrætsparken Copenhagen
Attendance: 41,000
Referee: Gösta Lindberg (Sweden)

=== 1953 ===
21 June 1953
13:30 (UTC+1:00)

Denmark	1-3	Sweden
Seebach 46'	Report	Thillberg 24', 65'; L. Eriksson 56'

Idrætsparken Copenhagen
Attendance: 39,500
Referee: Johan Alho (Finland)
16 August 1953
15:00 (UTC+1:00)

Sweden	4-0	Finland
Sandberg 22'; Sandell 24', 61'; Sandin 56'	Report

Råsunda Stadium, Stockholm
Attendance: 27,161
Referee: Aksel Asmussen (Denmark)
30 August 1953
14:00 (UTC+2:00)

Finland	1-4	Norway
Lahtinen 39'	Report	Hennum 6'; Thoresen 8', 44'; Angell-Hansen 47'

Olympic Stadium, Helsinki
Attendance: 20,819
Referee: Helge Andersen (Denmark)
13 September 1953
13:15 (UTC+1:00)

Norway	0-1	Denmark
Sørensen 32'	Report

Ullevaal Stadion, Oslo
Attendance: 35,552
Referee: Gösta Lindberg (Sweden)
4 October 1953
13:30 (UTC+1:00)

Denmark	6-1	Finland
Hansen 11', 36'; Petersen 25'; Sørensen 32'; Nielsen 50', 61'	Report	Køppen 40' (o.g.)

Idrætsparken Copenhagen
Attendance: 32,200
Referee: Edvin Pedersen (Norway)
18 October 1953
14:00 (UTC+1:00)

Sweden	0-0	Norway
	Report

Råsunda Stadium, Stockholm
Attendance: 27,025
Referee: Folke Nyberg (Finland)

=== 1954 ===
13 June 1954
18:00 (UTC+2:00)

Finland	2-2	Denmark
Myntti 45'; Hiltunen 58'	Report	Kendzior 64', 78' (pen.)

Olympic Stadium, Helsinki
Attendance: 17,539
Referee: Erik Westman (Sweden)
15 August 1954
17:00 (UTC+2:00)

Finland	1-10	Sweden
Lahtinen 40'	Report	Hamrin 6', 71', 80'; Eklund 7', 30', 48'; Thillberg 16', 59'; J. Eriksson 18', 21'

Olympic Stadium, Helsinki
Attendance: 15,409
Referee: Øivind Helgesen (Norway)
29 August 1954
13:15 (UTC+1:00)

Norway	3-1	Finland
Dybwad 57'; Johannessen 59'; Hennum 62'	Report	Hiltunen 6'

Ullevaal Stadion, Oslo
Attendance: 21,048
Referee: Helge Andersen (Denmark)
19 September 1954
13:15 (UTC+1:00)

Norway	1-1	Sweden
Sundby 75'	Report	Eriksson 68'

Ullevaal Stadion, Oslo
Attendance: 35,427
Referee: Tauno Aro (Finland)
10 October 1954
14:00 (UTC+1:00)

Sweden	5-2	Denmark
J. Eriksson 9'; Sandell 12', 38', 60'; K. Hansen 36' (o.g.)	Report	Hansen 6'; Sørensen 17'

Råsunda Stadium, Stockholm
Attendance: 36,700
Referee: Finn Bråthen (Norway)
31 October 1954
13:30 (UTC+1:00)

Denmark	0-1	Norway
	Report	Hennum 81'

Idrætsparken Copenhagen
Attendance: 36,200
Referee: John Erik Andersson (Sweden)

=== 1955 ===
19 June 1955
13:30 (UTC+1:00)

Denmark	2-1	Finland
Hansen 24' (pen.), 62'	Report	Lehmusvirta 59'

Idrætsparken Copenhagen
Attendance: 22,000
Referee: John Nilsson (Sweden)
14 August 1955
19:00 (UTC+2:00)

Finland	1-3	Norway
Hiltunen 6'	Report	Hennum 26', 55'; Kure 70'

Olympic Stadium, Helsinki
Attendance: 16,916
Referee: Ludvig Jørkov (Denmark)
28 August 1955
13:30 (UTC+1:00)

Sweden	3-0	Finland
Sandell 39', 58'; Lindskog 82'	Report

Olympiastadion, Helsingborg
Attendance: 19,593
Referee: Josef Larsen (Norway)
11 September 1955
13:15 (UTC+1:00)

Norway	1-1	Denmark
Nielsen 52' (o.g.)	Report	Jacobsen 75'

Ullevaal Stadion, Oslo
Attendance: 33,836
Referee: Aarne Eriksson (Finland)
25 September 1955
13:30 (UTC+1:00)

Sweden	1-1	Norway
Nilsson 4'	Report	Kotte 7'

Råsunda Stadium, Stockholm
Attendance: 27,375
Referee: Leo Helge (Denmark)
16 October 1955
13:30 (UTC+1:00)

Denmark	3-3	Sweden
Andersen 12', 81'; Lundberg 36'	Report	Nilsson 36'; Sandell 63'; Hamrin 89'

Idrætsparken Copenhagen
Attendance: 50,200
Referee: Finn Bråthen (Finland)

== Table ==
'Two points for a victory, one point for a draw, no points for a loss.

	Team	Pld	W	D	L	GF	GA	GD	Pts
1	Sweden	12	8	4	0	44	14	+30	20
2	Norway	12	6	4	2	25	12	+13	16
3	Denmark	12	3	3	6	23	26	–3	9
4	Finland	12	1	1	10	13	53	–40	3

== Winners ==
1952–55 Nordic Football Championship winners

Sweden
Fourth title

== Statistics ==
=== Goalscorers ===
There were 105 goals scored in 24 matches, for an average of 4.38 goals per match.

10 goals

- (Sweden) Nils-Åke Sandell

5 goals

- (Norway) Harald Hennum
- (Denmark) Jens Peder Hansen

4 goals

- (Sweden) Hasse Persson
- (Sweden) John Eriksson
- (Sweden) Henry Thillberg
- (Sweden) Kurt Hamrin
- (Norway) Gunnar Thoresen

3 goals

- (Denmark) Bent Sørensen
- (Finland) Matti Hiltunen
- (Norway) Odd Wang Sørensen
- (Norway) Kjell Kristiansen
- (Sweden) Birger Eklund
- (Sweden) Lars Råberg

2 goals

- (Denmark) Per Jensen
- (Denmark) Kurt Nielsen
- (Denmark) Ove Andersen
- (Sweden) Bertil Nilsson
- (Denmark) Poul Erik Petersen
- (Denmark) Valdemar Kendzior
- (Denmark) Holger Seebach
- (Finland) Nils Rikberg
- (Finland) Olavi Lahtinen
- (Norway) Henry Johannessen
- (Sweden) Gösta Sandberg
- (Sweden) Herbert Sandin

1 goal

- (Denmark) Knud Lundberg
- (Denmark) Jørgen Jacobsen
- (Denmark) Poul Åge Rasmussen
- (Finland) Aulis Rytkönen
- (Finland) Kalevi Lehtovirta
- (Finland) Simo Lehmusvirta
- (Finland) Seppo Pelkonen
- (Finland) Stig-Göran Myntti
- (Norway) Tor Jevne
- (Norway) Reidar Sundby
- (Norway) Pål Angell-Hansen
- (Norway) Hans Nordahl
- (Norway) Harry Kure
- (Norway) Arne Kotte
- (Norway) Gunnar Dybwad
- (Sweden) Karl-Alfred Jacobsson
- (Sweden) Yngve Brodd
- (Sweden) Lars Eriksson
- (Sweden) Bengt Lindskog
- (Sweden) Sylve Bengtsson

3 own goals

- (Denmark) Erik Køppen (against Finland)
- (Denmark) Kurt Hansen (against Sweden)
- (Denmark) Verner Nielsen (against Norway)

== See also ==
- Balkan Cup
- Baltic Cup
- Central European International Cup
- Mediterranean Cup
