= List of Djurgårdens IF Fotboll players (1–24 appearances) =

This list is about Djurgårdens IF players with between 1 and 24 league appearances. For a list of all Djurgårdens IF players with a Wikipedia article, see Category:Djurgårdens IF Fotboll players. For the current Djurgårdens IF first-team squad, see First-team squad.

This is a list of Djurgårdens IF players with fewer than 25 league appearances. Since playing their first competitive match, more than 400 players have made a league appearance for the club, many of whom have played between 1 and 25 matches.

== Players ==
Matches of current players as of before 2026 season.

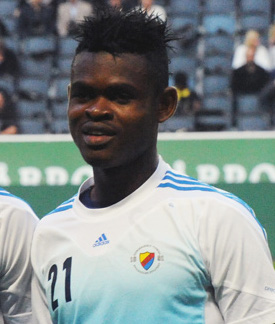
Godsway Donyoh has made 20 league appearances for Djurgårdens IF.

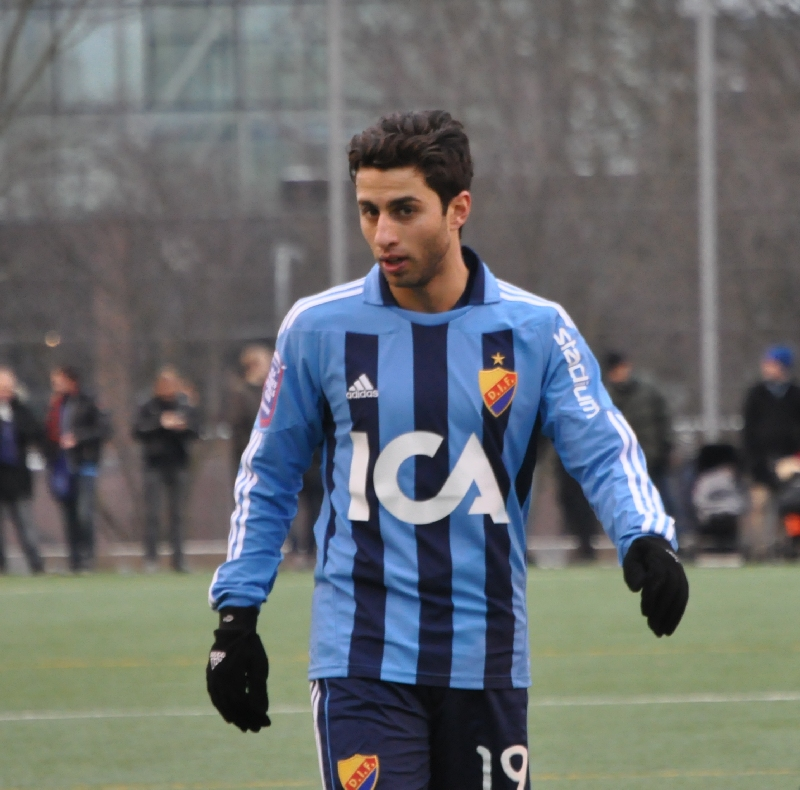
Nahir Oyal has made 14 league appearances for Djurgårdens IF.

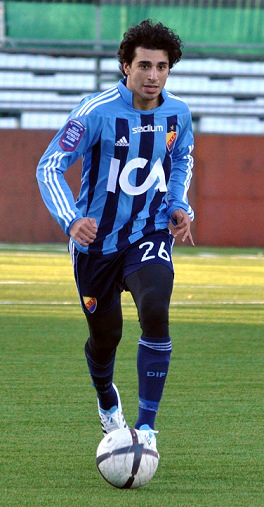
André Calisir has made seven league appearances for Djurgårdens IF.

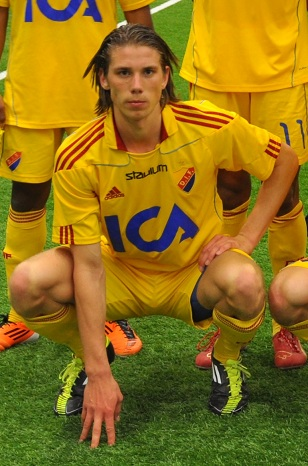
Carl Björk has made six league appearances for Djurgårdens IF.

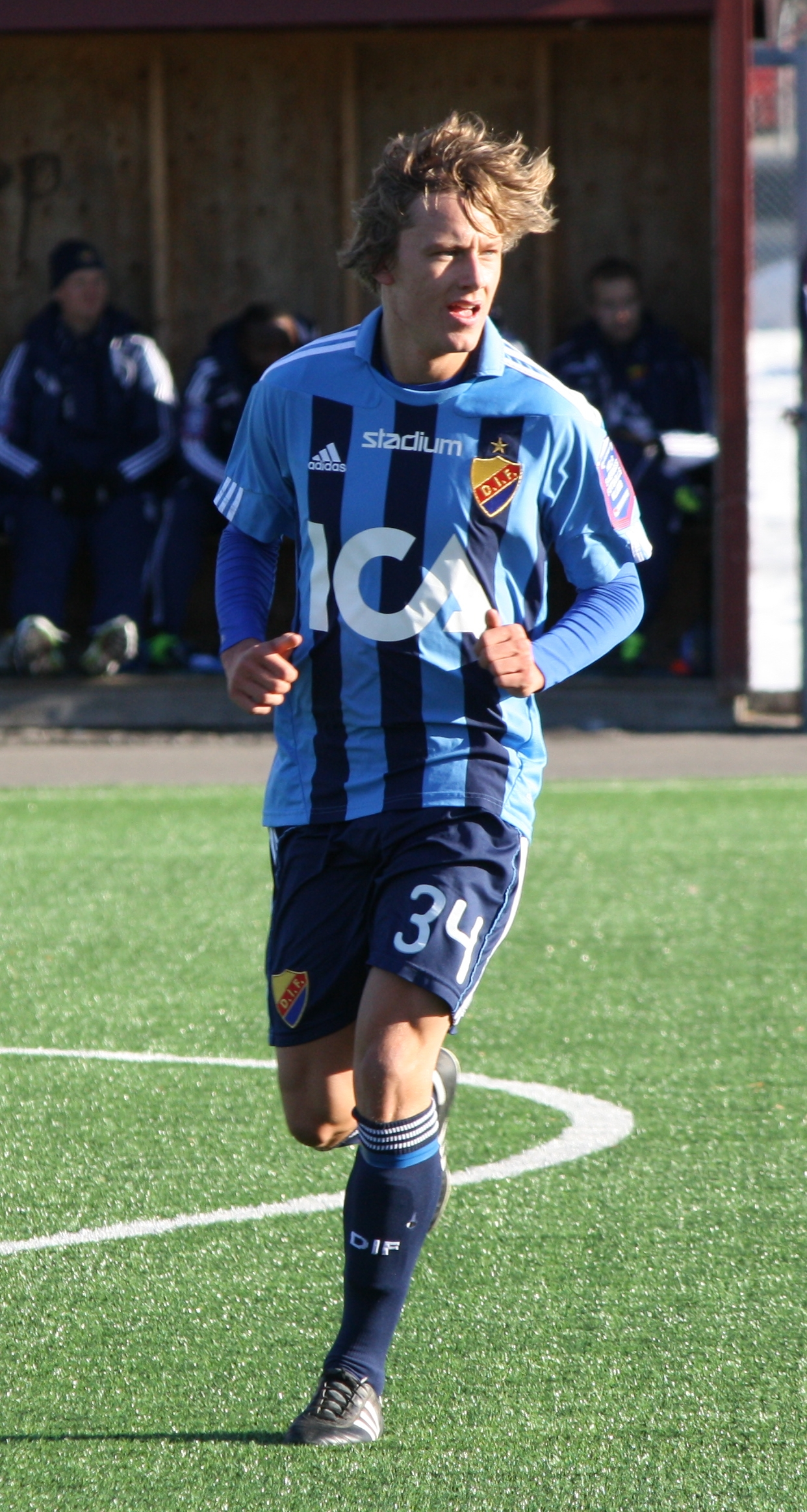
Joakim Alriksson has made five league appearances for Djurgårdens IF.

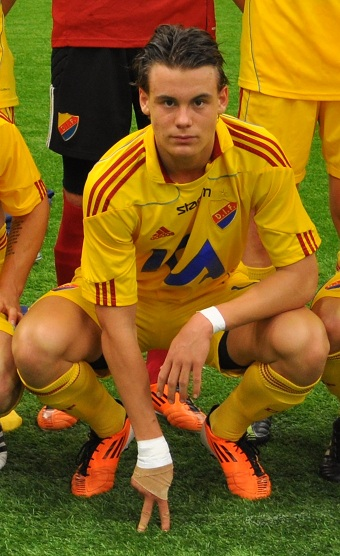
Philip Sparrdal Mantilla has made four league appearances for Djurgårdens IF.

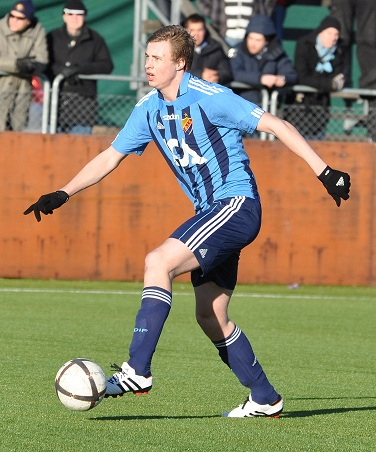
Daniel Jarl has made two league appearances for Djurgårdens IF.

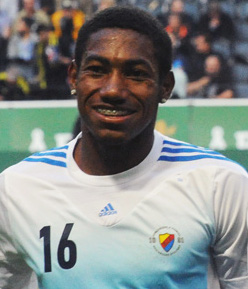
Pablo Dyego has made one league appearances for Djurgårdens IF.

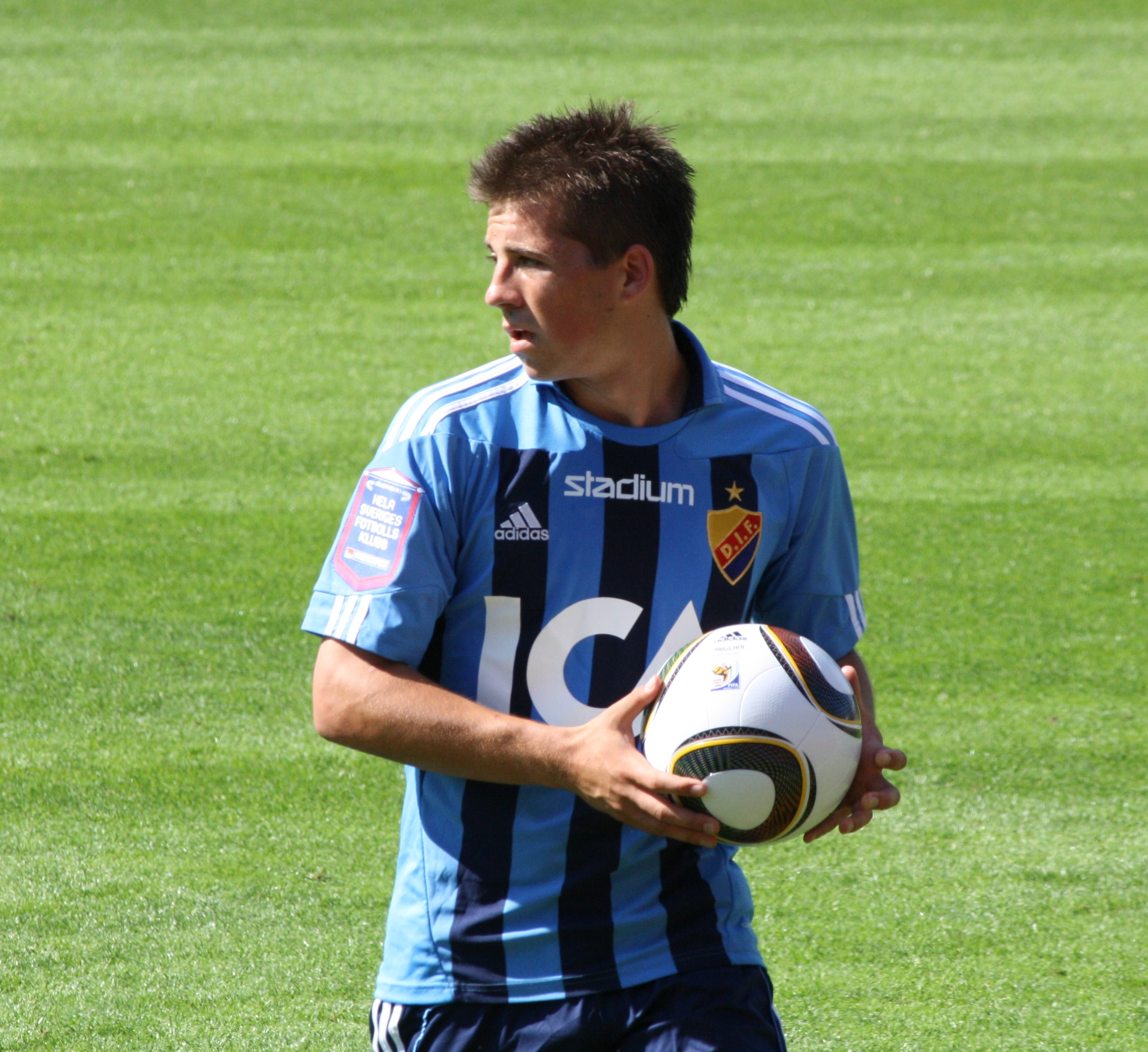
Danilo Kuzmanović has made one league appearances for Djurgårdens IF.

Name	Nationality	Position	Djurgården career	League apps	League goals
Folke Holmberg	Sweden		1951–1953	24	12
Bo Björkman	Sweden			24	9
Algot Haglund	Sweden			24	6
Jesper Jansson	Sweden	DF	1996	24	1
Feliciano Magro	Switzerland	MF	2005–2007	24	1
Peter Magnusson	Sweden	DF	2008–2010	24	0
Geert den Ouden	Netherlands	FW	2003–2004	23	14
Santeri Haarala	Finland	FW	2024-2026	23	2
Filip Manojlović	Serbia	GK	2025-	23	0
Daniel Stensson	Sweden	MF	2024-	23	0
Isak Hien	Sweden	DF	2021–2022	22	2
Gösta Karlsson	Sweden			22	2
Hugo Söderström	Sweden			22	2
Björn Carlsson	Sweden		1976–1978	22	1
Erik Lindbom	Sweden			21	16
Teddy Sheringham	England	FW	1985	21	13
Nyasha Mushekwi	Zimbabwe	FW	2015	21	12
Gunnar Blomström	Sweden			21	4
Kjetil Osvold	Norway	MF	1988	21	3
Johan Wallinder	Sweden		2001–2002	21	3
Jesper Nyholm	Philippines	DF	2020-2021	21	1
Carlos Banda	Sweden		1996–1999	21	0
Pierre Bengtsson	Sweden	DF	2022-2024	21	0
Lars Pettersson	Sweden	GK	1978–1979	21	0
Oskar Wahlström	Sweden	GK	2004–2009	21	0
Oscar Palm	Sweden			20	7
Godsway Donyoh	Ghana	FW	2013	20	2
Albert Öijermark	Sweden			20	2
Moon Seon-min	Korea	MF	2015–2016	20	2
Lennart Pettersson	Sweden		1950–1951	20	1
Birger Warneby	Sweden			20	0
Helge Hagberg	Sweden			20	0
Thomas Hanzon	Sweden		1979–1980	20	0
Johan Elmander	Sweden	FW	2002–2003	19	12
Hilmer Pettersson	Sweden		1950–1952	19	8
Thomas Sunesson	Sweden	FW	1986–1987	19	4
Oliver Berg	Norway	FW	2023	19	3
Christian Gröning	Sweden			19	3
Boyd Mwila	Zambia	FW	2009–2011	19	2
Roger Lindevall	Sweden			19	1
Branko Markovic	Sweden		1985–1986	19	1
Ivar Andersson	Sweden			19	0
Andreas Dahlén	Sweden	DF	2012	19	0
Kennet Johansson	Sweden	DF	1983–1984	19	0
Herman Nordegren	Sweden			19	0
Bo Finnhammar	Sweden		1953–1958	18	10
Mikael Anderson	Iceland	FW	2025-2026	18	6
Stefan Hermansson	Sweden			18	3
Gustaf Ekberg	Sweden			18	1
Georg Emke	Sweden			18	1
Zakaria Sawo	Sweden	FW	2025-2026	18	1
Sixten Sandberg	Sweden			17	5
Björn Persson	Sweden			17	4
Stefan Rexin	Sweden			17	3
Marc Pedersen	Denmark	DF	2012–2013	17	1
Rikard Andersson	Sweden			17	0
Rolf Fransson	Sweden			17	0
Jacob Rinne	Sweden	GK	2024-	17	0
Bengt Meijer	Sweden			16	3
Samuel Leach Holm	Sweden	MF	2024	16	2
Musa Qurbanlı	Azerbaijan	FW	2023-2024	16	2
Sigvard Bergh	Sweden			16	1
Martin Andersson	Sweden	MF	2008–2010	16	0
Viktor Bergh	Sweden	DF	2024-2026	16	0
Peter Eriksson	Sweden			16	0
Allan Fredberg	Sweden			16	0
Ernst Wahlberg	Sweden			15	13
Åke Pettersson	Sweden			15	3
Ulf Schramm	Sweden			15	3
Yosif Ayuba	Sweden		2009–2012	15	1
Mark Mayambela	South Africa	MF	2014–2015	15	1
Eje Nilsson	Sweden			15	1
Martin Lossman	Sweden			15	0
Per-Erik Olsson	Sweden			14	6
Arvid Schough	Sweden			14	6
Karl-Erik Jonsson	Sweden			14	3
Ricardo Santos	Brazil	FW	2012	14	3
Lars Åhs	Sweden			14	2
Hans Garpe	Sweden			14	2
Kjell Nyberg	Sweden		1970–1971	14	2
Jean Söderberg	Sweden			14	2
Stig Sundqvist	Sweden			14	2
Ibrahim Ba	France	MF	2005	14	1
Luis Solignac	Argentina	FW	2013	14	1
Brian Span	United States	MF	2012–2013	14	1
Bertil Andersson	Sweden			14	0
Mats Karlsson	Sweden		1966–1967	14	0
Gunnar Lundgren	Sweden			14	0
Lars Lundkvist	Sweden			14	0
Kenneth Maron	Sweden			14	0
Rune Othberg	Sweden		1955–1956	14	0
Nahir Oyal	Sweden	MF	2012–2015	14	0
Carl Runn	Sweden			14	0
Leif Strandh	Sweden			14	0
Jörgen Sundström	Sweden	FW	2000–2001	14	0
Søren Larsen	Denmark	FW	2004–2005	13	10
Gunnar Galin	Sweden		1927; 1929–1931	13	5
Sven Krantz	Sweden		1975–1976	13	2
Ove Rübsamen	Sweden		1975	13	2
Ivar Friberg	Sweden			13	1
Ingvar Sandberg	Sweden		1968–1971	13	1
Björn Jansson	Sweden			13	0
Allan Persson	Sweden			13	0
Peter Therkildsen	Denmark	DF	2024-2025	13	0
Hans Johansson	Sweden			12	5
Chic Charnley	England	MF	1992–1993	12	3
Brian McDermott	England	MF	1986	12	2
Roland Magnusson	Sweden			12	1
Leo Cornic	Norway	DF	2021–2022	12	0
Sven Lindberg	Sweden			12	0
Aki Riihilahti	Finland	MF	2007–2009	12	0
Aleksandr Vasyutin	Russia	GK	2021–2022	12	0
Per Larner	Sweden			11	10
Vitomir Štavljanin	Serbia	FW	1993	11	3
Sead Hakšabanović	Montenegro	MF	2022	11	2
Felix Vá	Angola	FW	2023-2024	11	2
Tomas Backman	Sweden	MF	2004–2007	11	1
Noel Milleskog	Sweden	FW	2023-2024	11	1
Hilmer Österqvist	Sweden			11	1
Albion Ademi	Albania	MF	2021-2023	11	0
Isak Alemayehu	Sweden	MF	2022-2025	11	0
Bo Braastrup Andersen	Denmark	GK	1999	11	0
Gösta Andersson	Sweden			11	0
Jan Åslund	Sweden			11	0
Lars Åstrand	Sweden		1987–1988	11	0
Patrik Eklöf	Sweden			11	0
Peter Hallström	Sweden			11	0
Erik Johansson	Sweden	DF	2018	11	0
Leif Lövegaard	Sweden			11	0
Luis Antonio Rodríguez	Argentina	MF	2010	11	0
Melcher Johansson-Säwensten	Sweden			10	3
Lars Carlsson	Sweden			10	0
Otto Elmblad	Sweden			10	0
Jan Aronsson	Sweden		1959	9	2
Jesper Blomqvist	Sweden	MF	2003–2005	9	1
Dan Burlin	Sweden	MF	2009	9	1
Anders Nilsson	Sweden		1990–1991	9	1
Ivan Nyhlén	Sweden			9	1
Knut Sandlund	Sweden			9	1
David Högberg	Sweden			9	0
Ronny Skoog	Sweden		1973–1974	9	0
Christer Willborg	Sweden			9	0
Jeppe Okkels	Denmark	FW	2025-	8	4
Sten-Olof Hoflin	Sweden			8	3
Malcolm Macdonald	England	FW	1979	8	2
Dan Bingestam	Sweden			8	1
Juraj Dovičovič	Slovakia	MF	2004	8	1
Oscar Pettersson	Sweden	FW	2019-2020	8	1
Gale Agbossoumonde	United States	DF	2011	8	0
Wilhelm Arwe	Sweden			8	0
Pär Cederqvist	Sweden	FW	2003–2004	8	0
Gustaf Dahlberg	Sweden			8	0
Amadou Doumbouya	Guinea	MF	2022	8	0
Per Eriksson	Sweden			8	0
Martin Fredriksson	Sweden			8	0
Stuart Garnham	England	GK	1981–1982	8	0
Sten Grönqvist	Sweden			8	0
Henry Hagelin	Sweden			8	0
Mihlali Mayambela	South Africa	MF	2016–2019	8	0
Pär Millqvist	Sweden		1986	8	0
Carlos Moros Gracia	Spain	DF	2023-2024	8	0
Hampus Nilsson	Sweden	GK	2015–2016	8	0
Holger Oscarsson	Sweden			8	0
Bertil Andersson	Sweden			7	8
Stig Eriksson	Sweden			7	3
Åke Andersson	Sweden	FW	1927	7	2
Åke Grübb	Sweden			7	2
Nicolaj Agger	Denmark	FW	2011	7	1
Nino Žugelj	Slovenia	FW	2025-	7	1
Aziz Corr Nyang	Gambia	MF	2002–2004	7	0
André Calisir	Sweden	DF	2007–2011	7	0
Ernst Engdahl	Sweden			7	0
Karl-Erik Isaksson	Sweden			7	0
Per-Anders Eklund	Sweden			6	3
Carl Björk	Sweden	FW	2011–2012	6	1
Valdemar Johannesson	Sweden			6	1
Sven Landberg	Sweden			6	1
Sven-Olof Wikman	Sweden			6	1
Jacob Bergström	Sweden	FW	2023	6	0
Brandt	Sweden			6	0
Omar Eddahri	Sweden	MF	2018	6	0
Adama Guira	Burkina Faso	MF	2011	6	0
Kjell Gustafsson	Sweden		1977	6	0
Oscar Jansson	Sweden	GK	2024	6	0
Johan Johnsson	Sweden			6	0
Karl Johansson	Sweden			6	0
Erik Lavass	Sweden			6	0
Torgny Matsson	Sweden			6	0
Knut Persson	Sweden			6	0
Christian Rubio Sivodedov	Sweden	MF	2014	6	0
Arne Lundh	Sweden			5	2
Per-Olof Magnusson	Sweden			5	2
Ronnie Aronsson	Sweden			5	1
Jonny Eriksson	Sweden			5	1
Siyabonga Nomvethe	South Africa	FW	2005	5	1
Joakim Alriksson	Sweden		2010–2011	5	0
Ivar André	Sweden			5	0
Adam Bergmark Wiberg	Sweden	FW	2019	5	0
Ture Fröberg	Sweden			5	0
Haruna Garba	Nigeria	FW	2017	5	0
Glenn Holm	Sweden			5	0
Kasper Jensen	Denmark	GK	2012–2013	5	0
Rami Kaib	Tunisia	DF	2023-2024	5	0
Sven Källén	Sweden			5	0
Alhaji Kamara	Sierra Leone	FW	2012	5	0
Ernst Karlberg	Sweden			5	0
Ingemar Lindevall	Sweden			5	0
Knut Lund	Sweden			5	0
Kristoffer Näfver	Sweden	MF	2008	5	0
John Strömberg	Sweden			5	0
Englund	Sweden			4	1
Friberg	Sweden			4	1
Tommy Johansson	Sweden			4	1
Pettersson	Sweden			4	1
Lars Pilö	Sweden	FW	1973–1974	4	1
Johan Andersson	Sweden	DF	2018-2019	4	0
Andersson	Sweden			4	0
Leif Claesson	Sweden		1969–1970	4	0
Hellgren	Sweden			4	0
Kalipha Jawla	Sweden	FW	2025-	4	0
Per Johansson	Sweden	DF	2007–2008	4	0
Movsisyan	Armenia	FW	2018	4	0
Jan Olofsson	Sweden		1968	4	0
Olsson	Sweden		1989	4	0
Julius Orest	Sweden		1945–1946	4	0
Philip Sparrdal Mantilla	Sweden	DF	2011–2014	4	0
Anders Westberg	Sweden	FW	1982–1983	4	0
Grönqvist	Sweden			3	1
Bo Hegland	Norway	FW	2025-	3	1
Larsson	Sweden			3	1
Andersson	Sweden		1965	3	0
Berglund	Sweden			3	0
Bergman	Sweden			3	0
Bergqvist	Sweden			3	0
Bogren	Sweden			3	0
Edvinger	Sweden			3	0
Daniel Hesser	Sweden		1993–1994	3	0
Johansson	Sweden			3	0
Jonsson	Sweden	DF	2020-2022	3	0
Jovovic	Serbia	MF	1997	3	0
Kristoffersen	Norway	FW	2017	3	0
Lorichs	Sweden			3	0
Lundberg	Sweden			3	0
Nebojša Marinković	Serbia	MF	2008	3	0
Mitku	Sweden	MF	2020	3	0
Nierenburg	Sweden		1959	3	0
Olsson	Sweden			3	0
Pettersson	Sweden			3	0
Ringbom	Sweden			3	0
Rosenkvist	Sweden			3	0
Sandberg	Sweden		1977	3	0
Johnny Wendt	Sweden	MF	1985–1986	3	0
Wickberg	Sweden			3	0
Lindvall	Sweden			2	1
Nils Nilsson	Sweden			2	1
Wodelius	Sweden			2	1
Andersson	Sweden			2	0
Bergström	Sweden			2	0
Brick	Sweden			2	0
Erik Burman	Sweden			2	0
Tony Dinning	England	MF	1993	2	0
Michael Englund	Sweden	DF	1981–1982	2	0
Flygar	Sweden			2	0
Gillström	Sweden			2	0
Oscar Gustafsson	Sweden			2	0
Jansson	Sweden			2	0
Jansson	Sweden			2	0
Johansson	Sweden			2	0
Johansson	Sweden			2	0
Johansson	Sweden			2	0
Daniel Jarl	Sweden	DF	2010–2013	2	0
Jörnlind	Sweden		1965	2	0
Trimi Makolli	Sweden	FW	2009–2013	2	0
Möller	Sweden		1962–1963	2	0
Nilsson	Sweden			2	0
Öhrström	Sweden			2	0
Pettersson	Sweden			2	0
André Picornell	Sweden	GK	2023-2024	2	0
Ahmed Saeed	Sweden	MF	2025-	2	0
Birger Sandberg	Sweden			2	0
Sipöcz	Sweden			2	0
Tim Söderström	Sweden	MF	2013–2015	2	0
Richard Spong	Sweden		2003–2004	2	0
Harry Sundberg	Sweden			2	0
Westling	Sweden			2	0
Pagguy Zunda	Sweden	FW	2000–2002	2	0
Brolin	Sweden			1	1
Gunnarsson	Sweden			1	1
Hinze	Sweden			1	1
Albihn	Sweden			1	0
Alexander Andersson	Sweden	MF	2025-	1	0
Andersson	Sweden			1	0
Karl Andersson	Sweden			1	0
Andersson	Sweden			1	0
Andersson	Sweden		1972	1	0
Göran Aral	Sweden		1975	1	0
Leif Aronsson	Sweden		1959	1	0
Alieu Atlee Manneh	Sweden	DF	2025-	1	0
Bengtsson	Sweden			1	0
Bergvall	Sweden			1	0
Björkman	Sweden			1	0
Blomqvist	Sweden			1	0
Anders Byrén	Sweden		1985	1	0
Carlsson	Sweden			1	0
Dahlstedt	Sweden			1	0
Dantowicth	Sweden			1	0
Pablo Dyego	Brazil	MF	2013	1	0
Eriksson	Sweden			1	0
Fagerberg	Sweden			1	0
Frank	Sweden		1957–1958	1	0
Alexandros Garcia Tsotidis	Sweden	FW	2022-	1	0
Gunnarsson	Sweden		1965	1	0
Jesper Håkansson	Denmark		2005–2006	1	0
Johansson	Sweden			1	0
Johansson	Sweden			1	0
Johansson	Sweden			1	0
Johansson	Sweden			1	0
Oscar Jonsson	Sweden		2016–2018	1	0
Danilo Kuzmanović	Serbia	DF	2010–2011	1	0
Levin	Sweden			1	0
Lindgren	Sweden			1	0
Patrik Luxenburg	Sweden		1990	1	0
Misiorny	Sweden	GK	1975	1	0
Bosse Nilsson	Sweden	DF	1967–1968	1	0
Wilmer Odefalk	Sweden	MF	2023	1	0
Magnus Olsson	Sweden			1	0
Pettersson	Sweden			1	0
Pettersson	Sweden			1	0
Pruscha	Sweden			1	0
Rockström	Sweden			1	0
Rohlin	Sweden		1986	1	0
Rothenberg	Sweden			1	0
Malkolm Nilsson Säfqvist	Sweden	GK	2024-2026	1	0
Sahlin	Sweden			1	0
Schmidt	Sweden			1	0
Schönning	Sweden			1	0
Schönwall	Sweden			1	0
Olle Sjösteen	Sweden		2000	1	0
Ströbeck	Sweden			1	0
Filip Tasic	Sweden		2016–2017	1	0
Wahlgren	Sweden			1	0
Wiman	Sweden		1979	1	0

== Sources ==
- Alsjö, Martin (2011). 100 år med Allsvensk fotboll (in Swedish). Idrottsförlaget. pp. 307–309. ISBN 978-91-977326-7-3.
- Persson, Gunnar; Glanell, Thomas; Lundgren, Lars; Stark, Janne; Strömberg, Robert, eds. (1988). Allsvenskan genom tiderna. Stockholm: Strömbergs idrottsböcker. ISBN 91-86184-35-0.
- Rehnberg, Bo; Wickman, Mats, eds. (2010). Djurgårdens IF 100 år: 1891–1991 [Djurgårdens IF 100 Years: 1891–1991] (in Swedish). Stockholm: Sellin & partner. ISBN 978-91-7055-029-4.
- "Årets football 1962" [1982 Football of the year].
- "Årets football 1983" [1983 Football of the year].
- "Årets football 1984" [1984 Football of the year].
- "Årets football 1985" [1985 Football of the year].
- "Årets football 1986" [1986 Football of the year].
- "Årets football 1988" [1988 Football of the year].
- "Årets football 1994" [1994 Football of the year].
- "Årets football 1995" [1995 Football of the year].
- "Årets football 1998" [1998 Football of the year].
- "Årets football 1999" [1999 Football of the year].
