= Nordic Cup (football) =

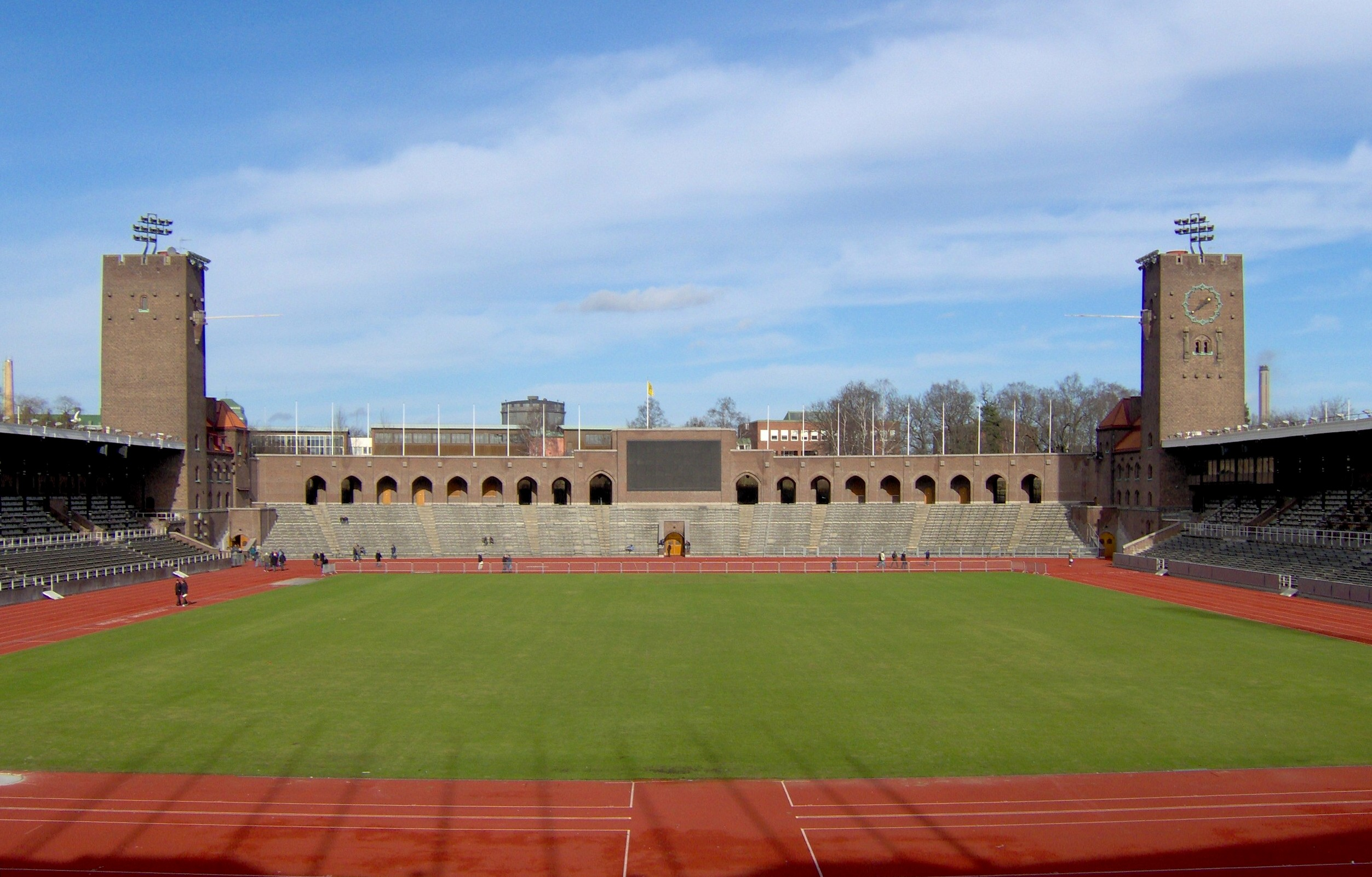
- The Stockholm Olympic Stadium in Stockholm hosted the final

Tournament details
- Dates: 19 June 1959 – 31 July 1962
- Teams: 16 (from 4 associations)

Final positions
- Champions: (Finland) Helsinki-Alliance
- Runners-up: (Sweden) Djurgården

Tournament statistics
- Matches played: 30
- Goals scored: 112 (3.73 per match)

The Nordic Cup (Danish: Nordisk cup; Swedish: Nordisk cup) was a cup competition for club teams from Denmark, Finland, Norway, and Sweden staged on one occasion, starting in June 1959 and ending on 31 July 1962.

== Summary ==
In December 1958, the group Stævnet proposed a cup competition for club teams from the Nordic countries at a Scandinavian football conference in Copenhagen, which was decided and 16 teams were invited. The teams responding to the invitation were IFK Norrköping, Djurgården, IFK Göteborg, GAIS, Malmö FF, Hälsingborg, Örgryte and AIK from Sweden, Viking FK, Skeid, and Fredrikstad from Norway, and Vejle, KB, AB, Frem, and Skovshoved from Denmark, while the Finnish teams only wanted to join as a combination team, which initially was rejected.

Initially the final was scheduled to be played in autumn 1960, but the participating team had problems finding match days and the semi-finals were rescheduled to spring 1961.

The Nordic cup saw low attendances.

On 31 July 1962, the first edition of the cup ended with a final on Stockholm Olympic Stadium between Djurgården of Stockholm and the Helsinki-Alliance, which the Helsinki team won with 1–0 on a penalty in first half, and won the trophy donated by Scandinavian Airlines.

== Teams ==
(Denmark) AB	(Denmark) Vejle	(Sweden) AIK	(Sweden) IFK Göteborg
(Denmark) Frem	(Finland) Helsinki-Alliance	(Sweden) Djurgården	(Sweden) IFK Norrköping
(Denmark) KB	(Norway) Fredrikstad	(Sweden) GAIS	(Sweden) Malmö FF
(Denmark) Skovshoved	(Norway) Skeid	(Sweden) Hälsingborg	(Sweden) Örgryte

== Results ==
Round of 16
(Norway) Fredrikstad	2	0	2
(Sweden) AIK	2	4	6
(Denmark) Vejle	3	0	3
(Sweden) IFK Norrköping	3	6	9
(Denmark) Skovshoved	0	1	1
(Sweden) Djurgården	3	5	8
(Sweden) IFK Göteborg	1	2	3
(Denmark) KB	1	3	4
(Sweden) GAIS	1	1	2
(Finland) Helsinki-Alliance	2	1	3
(Norway) Skeid	0	2	2
(Sweden) Örgryte	1	3	4
(Denmark) Frem	5	0	5
(Sweden) Hälsingborg	1	0	1
(Denmark) AB	1	0	1
(Sweden) Malmö FF	3	2	5

Quarter-finals
(Sweden) AIK	2	2	4
(Sweden) IFK Norrköping	5	6	11
(Sweden) Djurgården	1	1	2
(Denmark) KB	0	0	0
(Finland) Helsinki-Alliance (ct)	1	3 (2)	6
(Sweden) Örgryte	0	4 (2)	6
(Denmark) Frem	2	2	4
(Sweden) Malmö FF	0	2	2

Semi-finals
(Sweden) IFK Norrköping	0	3	3
(Sweden) Djurgården	2	5	7
(Finland) Helsinki-Alliance	2	3	5
(Denmark) Frem	1	1	2

Final
31 July 1962 – Stockholm
(Sweden) Djurgården	0
(Finland) Helsinki-Alliance	1

=== Round of 16 ===
Team 1	Agg.	Team 2	1st leg	2nd leg
Skeid (Norway)	2–4	(Sweden) Örgryte	0–1	2–3
IFK Göteborg (Sweden)	3–4	(Denmark) KB	1–1	2–3
Vejle (Denmark)	3–9	(Sweden) IFK Norrköping	3–3	0–6
Fredrikstad (Norway)	2–6	(Sweden) AIK	2–2	0–4
GAIS (Sweden)	2–3	(Finland) Helsinki-Alliance	1–2	1–1
AB (Denmark)	1–5	(Sweden) Malmö FF	1–3	0–2
Frem (Denmark)	5–1	(Sweden) Hälsingborg	5–1	0–0
Skovshoved (Denmark)	1–8	(Sweden) Djurgården	0–3	1–5

==== Matches ====
9 June 1959

Skeid (Norway)	0–1	(Sweden) Örgryte
		Wetterlind

Oslo
Attendance: 7,213
11 August 1959

Örgryte (Sweden)	3–2	(Norway) Skeid
Börjesson (2); Simonsson		Langhus

Nya Ullevi, Gothenburg
Attendance: 2,845

Örgryte won 4–2 on aggregate.

10 June 1959

IFK Göteborg (Sweden)	1–1	(Denmark) KB

Nya Ullevi, Gothenburg
Attendance: 5,525
12 August 1959

KB (Denmark)	3–2	(Sweden) IFK Göteborg
Jensen (2); Krahmer		Berndtsson; Andersson

Copenhagen

KB won 4–3 on aggregate.

16 June 1959

Vejle (Denmark)	3–3	(Sweden) IFK Norrköping
Enoksen (3)		Holmqvist (2); Bild

Vejle
29 July 1959

IFK Norrköping (Sweden)	6–0	(Denmark) Vejle
Holmqvist (2); Johnsson; Källgren; Bild; Eriksson

Norrköping
Attendance: 3,856

IFK Norrköping won 9–3 on aggregate.

24 June 1959

Fredrikstad (Norway)	2–2	(Sweden) AIK
		Mellberg (2)

Fredrikstad
29 July 1959

AIK (Sweden)	4–0	(Norway) Fredrikstad
Backman (2); Andersson; Skiöld

Råsunda Stadium, Solna
Attendance: 1,829
Referee: Tore Sjöberg (Sweden)

AIK won 6–2 on aggregate.

1 July 1959

GAIS (Sweden)	1–2	(Finland) Helsinki-Alliance

28 July 1959

Helsinki-Alliance (Finland)	1–1	(Sweden) GAIS
Rosquist		Jakobsson

Helsinki

Helsinki-Alliance won 3–2 on aggregate.

28 July 1959

AB (Denmark)	1–3	(Sweden) Malmö FF
Madsen		Nilsson (2); Svensson

Copenhagen
4 August 1959

Malmö FF (Sweden)	2–0	(Denmark) AB
Svahn; Svensson

Malmö
Attendance: 2,972

Malmö FF won 5–1 on aggregate.

30 July 1959

Frem (Denmark)	5–1	(Sweden) Hälsingborg
Andersen (2); Hansen (2); Petersen		Ahlberg

Frederiksberg Stadium, Copenhagen
Attendance: 4,500
Referee: Frede Hansen (Denmark)
5 August 1959

Hälsingborg (Sweden)	0–0	(Denmark) Frem

Olympia, Hälsingborg
Attendance: 2,697
Referee: Evert Månsson (Sweden)

Frem won 5–1 on aggregate.

4 August 1959

Skovshoved (Denmark)	0–3	(Sweden) Djurgården
		Eriksson; Hellström; Nilsson

Parken, Copenhagen
Attendance: 3,500
8 September 1959

Djurgården (Sweden)	5–1	(Denmark) Skovshoved
Tumba (2); Rydberg; Karlsson; Hellström		Wollertsen

Råsunda Stadium, Solna
Attendance: 2,206

Djurgården won 8–1 on aggregate.

=== Quarter-finals ===
Originally, the matches were supposed to be played before 15 November 1959.

Team 1	Agg.	Team 2	1st leg	2nd leg	Replay
Helsinki-Alliance (Finland)	6–6 (ct)	(Sweden) Örgryte	1–0	3–4	2–2
Djurgården (Sweden)	2–0	(Denmark) KB	1–0	1–0	
AIK (Sweden)	4–11	(Sweden) IFK Norrköping	2–5	2–6	
Frem (Denmark)	4–2	(Sweden) Malmö FF	2–0	2–2	

==== Matches ====
9 September 1959

Helsinki-Alliance (Finland)	1–0	(Sweden) Örgryte
Ekman

Helsinki Olympic Stadium, Helsinki
13 October 1959

Örgryte (Sweden)	4–3	(Finland) Helsinki-Alliance
Börjesson (2); Simonsson; Wetterlind		Kankkonen (2); Nevalainen

Nya Ullevi, Gothenburg
Attendance: 3,744
28 June 1960

Helsinki-Alliance (Finland)	2–2	(Sweden) Örgryte
Pärnänen; Kankkonen (p)		Lindkvist; Simonsson

Helsinki
Attendance: 6,000

Helsinki-Alliance won on coin flipping.

20 October 1959

Djurgården (Sweden)	1–0	(Denmark) KB
Hellström

Råsunda Stadium, Solna
Attendance: 1,098
1 June 1960

KB (Denmark)	0–1	(Sweden) Djurgården
		Eklund

Parken, Copenhagen
Attendance: 5,500

Djurgården won 2–0 on aggregate.

22 October 1959

AIK (Sweden)	2–5	(Sweden) IFK Norrköping
Mellberg; Johansson		Martinsson (2); Jonsson; Bild; Eriksson

Råsunda Stadium, Solna
Attendance: 1,022
Referee: Yngve Johansson (Sweden)
8 November 1959

IFK Norrköping (Sweden)	6–2	(Sweden) AIK
Källgren (3); Bild (2); Martinsson		Bengtsson; Johansson

Idrottsparken, Norrköping
Attendance: 1,319
Referee: Hans Olsson (Sweden)

IFK Norrköping won 11–4 on aggregate.

31 March 1960

Frem (Denmark)	2–0	(Sweden) Malmö FF
Andersen (1, 1p)

Parken, Copenhagen
Attendance: 4,000
Referee: Valdemar Hansen (Denmark)
28 June 1960

Malmö FF (Sweden)	2–2	(Denmark) Frem
Tillberg; Svensson		Nielsen (p); Johansen

Malmö Stadium, Malmö
Attendance: 2,700
Referee: Edvin Mårtensson (Sweden)

Frem won 4–2 on aggregate.

=== Semi-finals ===
Team 1	Agg.	Team 2	1st leg	2nd leg
IFK Norrköping (Sweden)	3–7	(Sweden) Djurgården	0–2	3–5
Helsinki-Alliance (Finland)	5–2	(Denmark) Frem	2–1	3–1

==== Matches ====
9 April 1961

IFK Norrköping (Sweden)	0–2	(Sweden) Djurgården
		Skiöld; Karlsson

Idrottsparken, Norrköping
Attendance: 4,156
25 June 1962

Djurgården (Sweden)	5–3	(Sweden) IFK Norrköping
Eriksson (4); Karlsson		Lagerlund (2); Löfgren

Råsunda Stadium, Solna
Attendance: 4,230

Djurgården won 7–3 on aggregate.

4 August 1961

Helsinki-Alliance (Finland)	2–1	(Denmark) Frem
Kankkonen (2)		Gronemann

Helsinki Olympic Stadium, Helsinki
Attendance: 5,000
Referee: Hirviniemi (Finland)
15 August 1961

Frem (Denmark)	1–3	(Finland) Helsinki-Alliance
Petersen		Stück (3)

Østerbro Stadium, Copenhagen
Attendance: 3,400
Referee: Ejner Poulsen (Denmark)

Helsinki-Alliance won 5–2 on aggregate.

=== Final ===
31 July 1962
18:30

Djurgården (Sweden)	0–1	(Finland) Helsinki-Alliance
		(p)

Stockholm Olympic Stadium, Stockholm
Attendance: 1,761
Referee: Jarl Hansen (Denmark)

Djurgården
1	(Sweden) Arne Arvidsson
2	(Sweden) Jan Karlsson
3	(Sweden) Lars Arnesson
4	(Sweden) Gösta Sandberg
5	(Sweden) Lars Broström
6	(Sweden) Hans Mild
7	(Sweden) Hans Karlsson
8	(Sweden) Leif Skiöld
9	(Sweden) Leif Eriksson
10	(Sweden) Lars-Olof Sandberg
11	(Sweden) Jan Åslund

Helsinki-Alliance
1	(Finland) Anders Westerholm
2	(Finland) Reijo Jalava
3	(Finland) Karl Ström
4	(Finland) Stig Holmqvist
5	(Finland) Pertti Hartikainen
6	(Finland) Sakari Pihlamo
7	(Finland) Eero Rauniola
8	(Finland) Hannu Kankkonen
9	(Finland) Raimo Kauppinen
10	(Finland) Paavo Lyytikäinen
11	(Finland) Ilka Hayla

== See also ==
- Royal League
