= 1959 Djurgårdens IF season =

Djurgården
1959 season
- Manager: Lajos Szendrődi (spring); Birger Sandberg & Knut Hallberg (autumn)
- Stadium: Råsunda Stadium
- Allsvenskan: Winner
- Top goalscorer: League: Sven Tumba (11); All: Sven Tumba (11)
- Highest home attendance: 48,894 (11 October vs IFK Göteborg, Allsvenskan)
- Lowest home attendance: 5,352 (13 August vs GAIS, Allsvenskan)
- Average home league attendance: 22,696

The 1959 season was Djurgårdens IF's 59th in existence, their 15th season in Allsvenskan and their 10th consecutive season in the league. They were competing in Allsvenskan.

== Player statistics ==
Appearances for competitive matches only.

No.	Pos	Nat	Player	Total		Allsvenskan	
No.	Pos	Nat	Player	Apps	Goals	Apps	Goals
		(Sweden) SWE	Hans Andersson-Tvilling	8	3	8	3
	GK	(Sweden) SWE	Arne Arvidsson	22	0	22	0
		(Sweden) SWE	Jan Aronsson	9	2	9	2
		(Sweden) SWE	Leif Aronsson	1	0	1	0
		(Sweden) SWE	Lars Broström	21	0	21	0
		(Sweden) SWE	Birger Eklund	12	5	12	5
		(Sweden) SWE	John Eriksson	11	3	11	3
		(Sweden) SWE	Stig Gustafsson	22	0	22	0
		(Sweden) SWE	Olle Hellström	22	0	22	0
		(Sweden) SWE	Karl Erik Isaksson	1	0	1	0
		(Sweden) SWE	Hans Karlsson	18	7	18	7
		(Sweden) SWE	Hans Mild	22	0	22	0
		(Sweden) SWE	Eje Nilsson	6	1	6	1
		(Sweden) SWE	Nils Nilsson	2	1	2	1
		(Sweden) SWE	Sigge Parling	22	0	22	0
		(Sweden) SWE	Åke Rydberg	6	4	6	4
		(Sweden) SWE	Gösta Sandberg	21	10	21	10
		(Sweden) SWE	Sven Tumba	16	11	16	11

=== Goals ===
==== Total ====
Name	Goals
(Sweden) Sven Tumba	11
(Sweden) Gösta Sandberg	10
(Sweden) Hans Karlsson	7
(Sweden) Birger Eklund	5
(Sweden) Åke Rydberg	4
(Sweden) Hans Andersson-Tvilling	3
(Sweden) John Eriksson	3
(Sweden) Jan Aronsson	2
(Sweden) Eje Nilsson	1
(Sweden) Nils Nilsson (footballer)	1

== Competitions ==
=== Allsvenskan ===
==== League table ====
Pos	Team	Pld	W	D	L	GF	GA	GD	Pts	Qualification or relegation
1	Djurgårdens IF (C)	22	11	10	1	46	20	+26	32	
2	IFK Norrköping	22	14	3	5	58	30	+28	31	
3	IFK Göteborg	22	14	3	5	56	28	+28	31	Qualification to European Cup preliminary round (Note: IFK Göteborg qualified for the European Cup as Allsvenskan leaders in the spring of 1959.)
4	Örgryte IS	22	13	4	5	53	38	+15	30	
5	Malmö FF	22	12	4	6	50	29	+21	28	

Rules for classification: 1) points; 2) goal difference; 3) number of goals scored.
(C) Champions

=== Nordic Cup ===
The tournament continued into the 1960 season.

==== Round of 16 ====
4 August 1959	Skovshoved (Denmark)	0–3	(Sweden) Djurgården	Copenhagen
			Eriksson; Hellström; Nilsson	Stadium: Parken; Attendance: 3,500

8 September 1959	Djurgården (Sweden)	5–1	(Denmark) Skovshoved	Solna
	Tumba (2); Rydberg; Karlsson; Hellström		Wollertsen	Stadium: Råsunda Stadium; Attendance: 2,206

==== Quarter-finals ====
20 October 1959	Djurgården (Sweden)	1–0	(Denmark) KB	Solna
	Hellström			Stadium: Råsunda Stadium; Attendance: 1,098
