= Helsinki-Alliance =

Football team from Helsinki

Helsinki-Alliance (Swedish: Helsingforsalliansen) was a football team from Helsinki that took part in the 1959–62 Nordic Cup and eventually won the tournament after having beaten Djurgården in the final. The team consisted of players otherwise representing other clubs in Helsinki.

In the final, the team fielded Anders Westerholm, Reijo Jalava, Karl Ström, Stig Holmqvist, Pertti Hartikainen, Sakari Pihlamo, Eero Rauniola, Hannu Kankkonen, Raimo Kauppinen, Paavo Lyytikäinen, and Ilka Hayla.

== Honours ==
=== Cups ===
- Nordic Cup:
  - Winners (1): 1959–62
