= Djurgårdens IF Fotboll in European football =

Swedish club in European football

Djurgårdens IF in European football
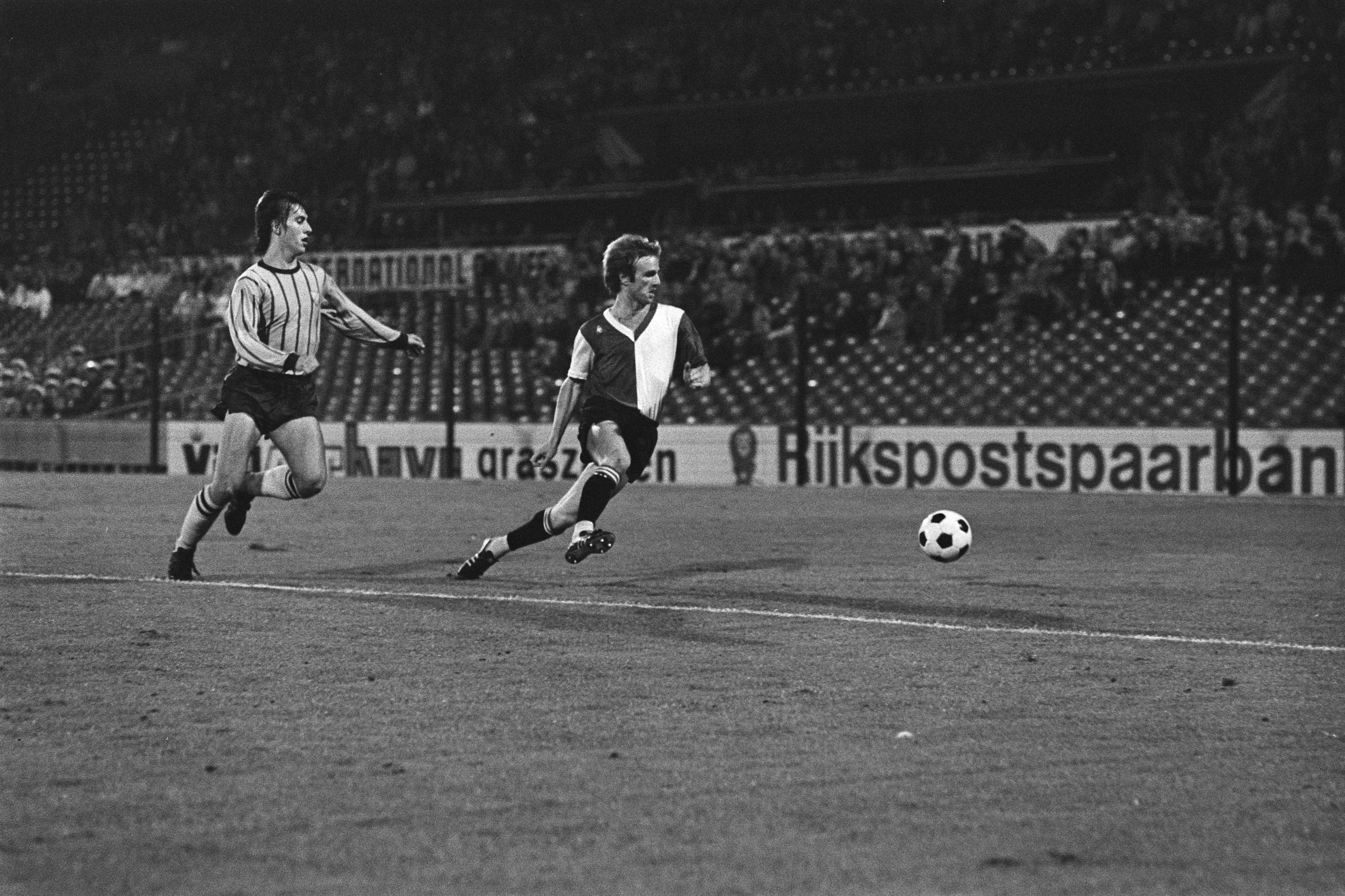
- Djurgården against Feyenoord at Feijenoord Stadion, Rotterdam, during the 1976–77 UEFA Cup
- Club: Djurgårdens IF
- Most appearances: Haris Radetinac (29)
- Top scorer: Joel Asoro (8)
- First entry: 1955–56 European Cup
- Latest entry: 2024–25 UEFA Conference League

Djurgårdens Idrottsförening, also known simply as Djurgårdens IF, is a Swedish professional football club based in Stockholm. The club have participated in 20 editions of the club competitions governed by UEFA, the chief authority for football across Europe, during 18 seasons. These include seven seasons in the European Cup and Champions League, nine seasons in the UEFA Cup and Europa League, three seasons in the UEFA Europa Conference League, three seasons in the Cup Winners' Cup and one season in the Intertoto Cup.

Djurgården's first match in European football was against Gwardia Warsaw of Poland in the 1955–56 European Cup, a 0–0 draw in Stockholm. John Eriksson scored Djurgården's first goal in European football in the return leg in Warsaw.

Djurgården reached the quarter-final of the inaugural European Cup, where they lost to Hibernian FC of Scotland. Other merits include reaching the group stage of the UEFA Europa Conference League in 2022–23, and qualifying for the round of 16, which they lost against Lech Poznań of Poland. In 2024–25, Djurgården reached the league phase of the UEFA Conference League, where they finished 5th and again qualified for the round of 16. In said tournament, Djurgården then advanced to the semi-finals by beating Rapid Wien of Austria, which they lost to Chelsea, 1–5 on aggregate.

Djurgården's 8–0 victory over Apollon Limassol of Cyprus in the 1996 UEFA Intertoto Cup is the club's most decisive win in European competitions, while the team's heaviest defeat is 0–6, against Bulgarian club Levski Sofia in the 1965–66 European Cup. With 26 appearances in European competitions, Haris Radetinac is Djurgården's most capped player. Joel Asoro has scored the most European goals with 8.

Djurgården also competed in the non-UEFA European competitions the 1964–65 Inter-Cities Fairs Cup, the 1966–67 Inter-Cities Fairs Cup, and in 13 instances of the Intertoto Cup before it became a UEFA competition (1963–64, 1965–66, 1967, 1968, 1969, 1970, 1971, 1972, 1973, 1974, 1976, 1989, and 1991). Furthermore, Djurgården competed in the inter-Nordic competitions the 1959–62 Nordic Cup, the 2004–05 Royal League, and the 2005–06 Royal League. Of these competitions, Djurgården reached the final of the 1959–62 Nordic Cup, which they lost to Helsinki-Alliance of Finland. They also reached the semi-finals of the 2005–06 Royal League, which they lost to Lillestrøm SK of Norway. To these results, a heavier loss than the one above, 0–7 against Wacker Innsbruck in the 1967 Intertoto Cup, can also be included.

== Key ==
- S = Seasons
- Pld = Played
- W = Games won
- D = Games drawn
- L = Games lost
- GF = Goals for
- GA = Goals against
- GD = Goal difference
- Final = Final
- SF = Semi-finals
- QF = Quarter-finals
- R16 = Round of 16
- 2R = Round 2
- 1R = Round 1
- GS = Group stage
- LP = League phase
- PO = Play-off round
- QR = Qualifying round
- 3QR = Third qualifying round
- 2QR = Second qualifying round
- 1QR = First qualifying round
- PR = Preliminary round
- a.e.t. = Match determined after extra time
- a = Match determined by away goals rule
- p = Match determined by penalty shoot-out
- Agg = Aggregated score
- Ref = Reference

Djurgården's score is noted first in all of the match results given below.

== Overall record ==
=== By competition ===
Tournament	Pld	W	D	L	GF	GA	GD	Win%
European Cup/UEFA Champions League	17	4	5	8	17	30	−13	23.5
UEFA Cup/UEFA Europa League	26	9	7	10	34	39	−5	34.6
UEFA Europa Conference League/UEFA Conference League	34	20	4	10	57	38	+19	58.8
European Cup Winners' Cup/UEFA Cup Winners' Cup	8	1	4	3	10	11	−1	12.5
UEFA Intertoto Cup	4	2	0	2	15	6	+9	50.0
Total	89	36	20	33	133	124	+9	40.4

=== By opponent club country ===
Country	Pld	W	D	L	GF	GA	GD	Win%
Austria	4	1	1	2	6	6	+0	25.0
Belgium	2	2	0	0	5	2	+3	100.0
Bulgaria	2	1	0	1	2	7	−5	50.0
Croatia	2	2	0	0	4	1	+3	100.0
Cyprus	5	3	0	2	16	4	+12	60.0
Czech Republic	2	0	0	2	1	5	−4	0.0
Denmark	2	1	1	0	3	1	+2	50.0
England	2	0	0	2	1	5	−4	0.0
Estonia	2	0	2	0	2	2	+0	0.0
Faroe Islands	1	1	0	0	5	1	+4	100.0
Finland	2	1	1	0	4	2	+2	50.0
France	2	0	0	2	1	3	−2	0.0
Germany	1	0	0	1	2	3	−1	0.0
Gibraltar	1	1	0	0	2	1	+1	100.0
Greece	1	1	0	0	2	1	+1	100.0
Hungary	1	0	0	1	0	2	−2	0.0
Iceland	3	1	1	1	3	5	−2	33.3
Republic of Ireland	6	3	3	0	7	2	+5	50.0
Italy	2	0	1	1	3	6	−3	0.0
Lithuania	2	1	1	0	2	0	+2	50.0
Luxembourg	4	2	1	1	8	1	+7	50.0
Netherlands	4	2	0	2	5	8	−3	50.0
Norway	6	5	0	1	15	11	+4	83.3
Poland	7	2	1	4	7	11	−4	28.6
Portugal	1	0	0	1	1	2	−1	0.0
Romania	3	2	0	1	6	3	+3	66.7
Scotland	2	0	0	2	1	4	−3	0.0
Serbia	4	0	3	1	6	9	−3	0.0
Slovakia	2	1	0	1	2	3	−1	50.0
Slovenia	2	2	0	0	2	0	+2	100.0
Spain	2	0	1	1	2	4	−2	0.0
Switzerland	2	0	1	1	2	3	−1	0.0
Ukraine	2	0	1	1	2	3	−1	0.0
Wales	3	1	1	1	3	3	+0	33.3

=== By club ===
Clubs Djurgården have played against a minimum of three times:

Country	Pld	W	D	L	GF	GA	GD	Win%
(Republic of Ireland) Shamrock Rovers	4	3	1	0	6	1	+5	75.0

== Matches ==
=== UEFA Champions League ===
Season	Stage	Opponent		Date	Venue	Score	Agg	Ref
Season	Stage	Team	Country	Date	Venue	Score	Agg	Ref
European Cup
1955–56	1R	Gwardia Warszawa	Poland	20 September 1955	Stockholm Olympic Stadium, Stockholm	0–0	4–1	
1955–56	1R	Gwardia Warszawa	Poland	12 October 1955	Polish Army Stadium, Warsaw	4–1	4–1	
1955–56	QF	Hibernian FC	Scotland	23 November 1955	Firhill Park, Glasgow	1–3	1–4	
1955–56	QF	Hibernian FC	Scotland	28 November 1955	Easter Road, Edinburgh	0–1	1–4	
1965–66	PR	Levski Sofia	Bulgaria	12 September 1965	Stockholm Olympic Stadium, Stockholm	2–1	2–7	
1965–66	PR	Levski Sofia	Bulgaria	3 October 1965	Vasil Levski National Stadium, Sofia	0–6	2–7	
1967–68	1R	Górnik Zabrze	Poland	20 September 1967	Silesian Stadium, Chorzów	0–3	0–4	
1967–68	1R	Górnik Zabrze	Poland	4 October 1967	Stockholm Olympic Stadium, Stockholm	0–1	0–4	
UEFA Champions League
2003–04	2QR	FK Partizan	Serbia and Montenegro	30 July 2003	Partizan Stadium, Belgrade	1–1	3–3	
2003–04	2QR	FK Partizan	Serbia and Montenegro	6 August 2003	Råsunda Stadium, Solna	2–2 (a)	3–3	
2004–05	2QR	Kaunas	Lithuania	28 July 2004	Råsunda Stadium, Solna	0–0	2–0	
2004–05	2QR	Kaunas	Lithuania	4 August 2004	Darius and Girėnas Stadium, Kaunas	2–0	2–0	
2004–05	3QR	Juventus	Italy	10 August 2004	Stadio delle Alpi, Turin	2–2	3–6	
2004–05	3QR	Juventus	Italy	25 August 2004	Råsunda Stadium, Solna	1–4	3–6	
2006–07	2QR	MFK Ružomberok	Slovakia	26 July 2006	Råsunda Stadium, Solna	1–0	2–3	
2006–07	2QR	MFK Ružomberok	Slovakia	2 August 2006	Štadión MFK Ružomberok, Ružomberok	1–3	2–3	
2020–21	1QR	Ferencváros	Hungary	19 August 2020	Groupama Arena, Budapest	0–2		

=== UEFA Europa League ===
Season	Stage	Opponent		Date	Venue	Score	Agg	Ref
Season	Stage	Team	Country	Date	Venue	Score	Agg	Ref
UEFA Cup
1971–72	1R	OFK Belgrade	Yugoslavia	15 September 1971	Omladinski Stadium, Belgrade	1–4	3–6	
1971–72	1R	OFK Belgrade	Yugoslavia	29 September 1971	Stockholm Olympic Stadium, Stockholm	2–2	3–6	
1974–75	1R	IK Start	Norway	18 September 1974	Kristiansand Stadion, Kristiansand	2–1	7–1	
1974–75	1R	IK Start	Norway	2 October 1974	Stockholm Olympic Stadium, Stockholm	5–0	7–1	
1974–75	2R	Dukla Prague	Czechoslovakia	23 October 1974	Stockholm Olympic Stadium, Stockholm	0–2	1–5	
1974–75	2R	Dukla Prague	Czechoslovakia	6 November 1974	Stadion Juliska, Prague	1–3	1–5	
1976–77	1R	Feyenoord	Netherlands	15 September 1976	Feijenoord Stadion, Rotterdam	0–3	2–4	
1976–77	1R	Feyenoord	Netherlands	29 September 1976	Stockholm Olympic Stadium, Stockholm	2–1	2–4	
2002–03	QR	Shamrock Rovers	Republic of Ireland	15 August 2002	Tolka Park, Dublin	3–1	5–1	
2002–03	QR	Shamrock Rovers	Republic of Ireland	29 August 2002	Råsunda Stadium, Solna	2–0	5–1	
2002–03	1R	FC Copenhagen	Denmark	19 September 2002	Parken, Copenhagen	0–0	3–1	
2002–03	1R	FC Copenhagen	Denmark	3 October 2002	Råsunda Stadium, Solna	3–1	3–1	
2002–03	2R	Bordeaux	France	29 October 2002	Råsunda Stadium, Solna	0–1	1–3	
2002–03	2R	Bordeaux	France	12 November 2002	Stade Chaban-Delmas, Bordeaux	1–2	1–3	
2004–05	1R	Utrecht	Netherlands	16 September 2004	Stadion Galgenwaard, Utrecht	0–4	3–4	
2004–05	1R	Utrecht	Netherlands	30 September 2004	Råsunda Stadium, Solna	3–0	3–4	
2005–06	2QR	Cork City	Republic of Ireland	11 August 2005	Råsunda Stadium, Solna	1–1	1–1 (a)	
2005–06	2QR	Cork City	Republic of Ireland	25 August 2005	Turners Cross, Cork	0–0	1–1 (a)	
2008–09	1QR	Flora	Estonia	17 July 2008	Råsunda Stadium, Solna	0–0	2–2 (a)	
2008–09	1QR	Flora	Estonia	31 July 2008	A. Le Coq Arena, Tallinn	2–2	2–2 (a)	
2008–09	2QR	Rosenborg	Norway	14 August 2008	Råsunda Stadium, Solna	2–1	2–6	
2008–09	2QR	Rosenborg	Norway	28 August 2008	Lerkendal Stadion, Trondheim	0–5	2–6	
UEFA Europa League
2018–19	2QR	Mariupol	Ukraine	26 July 2018	Tele2 Arena, Stockholm	1–1	2–3	
2018–19	2QR	Mariupol	Ukraine	2 August 2018	Chornomorets Stadium, Odesa	1–2 (a.e.t)	2–3	
2020–21	2QR	Europa	Gibraltar	17 September 2020	Tele2 Arena, Stockholm	2–1		
2020–21	3QR	CFR Cluj	Romania	24 September 2020	Tele2 Arena, Stockholm	0–1		

=== UEFA Conference League ===
Season	Stage	Opponent		Date	Venue	Score	Agg	Ref
Season	Stage	Team	Country	Date	Venue	Score	Agg	Ref
UEFA Europa Conference League
2022–23	2QR	Rijeka	Croatia	21 July 2022	Stadion Rujevica, Rijeka	2–1	4–1	
2022–23	2QR	Rijeka	Croatia	28 July 2022	Tele2 Arena, Stockholm	2–0	4–1	
2022–23	3QR	Sepsi OSK	Romania	4 August 2022	Stadionul Sepsi Arena, Sfântu Gheorghe	3–1	6–2	
2022–23	3QR	Sepsi OSK	Romania	11 August 2022	Tele2 Arena, Stockholm	3–1	6–2	
2022–23	PO	APOEL	Cyprus	17 August 2022	Tele2 Arena, Stockholm	3–0	5–3	
2022–23	PO	APOEL	Cyprus	23 August 2022	GSP Stadium, Nicosia	2–3	5–3	
2022–23	GS	Shamrock Rovers	Republic of Ireland	8 September 2022	Tallaght Stadium, Dublin	0–0	1st	
2022–23	GS	Molde	Norway	15 September 2022	Tele2 Arena, Stockholm	3–2	1st	
2022–23	GS	Gent	Belgium	6 October 2022	Ghelamco Arena, Ghent	1–0	1st	
2022–23	GS	Gent	Belgium	13 October 2022	Tele2 Arena, Stockholm	4–2	1st	
2022–23	GS	Molde	Norway	27 October 2022	Aker Stadion, Molde	3–2	1st	
2022–23	GS	Shamrock Rovers	Republic of Ireland	3 November 2022	Tele2 Arena, Stockholm	1–0	1st	
2022–23	R16	Lech Poznań	Poland	9 March 2023	Stadion Poznań, Poznań	0–2	0–5	
2022–23	R16	Lech Poznań	Poland	16 March 2023	Tele2 Arena, Stockholm	0–3	0–5	
2023–24	2QR	Luzern	Switzerland	27 July 2023	Tele2 Arena, Stockholm	1–2	2–3	
2023–24	2QR	Luzern	Switzerland	3 August 2023	Swissporarena, Lucerne	1–1	2–3	
UEFA Conference League
2024–25	2QR	Progrès Niederkorn	Luxembourg	25 July 2024	Tele2 Arena, Stockholm	3–0	3–1	
2024–25	2QR	Progrès Niederkorn	Luxembourg	1 August 2024	Stade Municipal, Differdange	0–1	3–1	
2024–25	3QR	Ilves	Finland	8 August 2024	Tammelan Stadion, Tampere	1–1	4–2	
2024–25	3QR	Ilves	Finland	15 August 2024	Tele2 Arena, Stockholm	3–1	4–2	
2024–25	PO	NK Maribor	Slovenia	22 August 2024	Tele2 Arena, Stockholm	1–0	2–0	
2024–25	PO	NK Maribor	Slovenia	29 August 2024	Ljudski vrt, Maribor	1–0	2–0	
2024–25	LP	LASK	Austria	3 October 2024	Raiffeisen Arena, Linz	2–2	5th	
2024–25	LP	Vitória de Guimarães	Portugal	24 October 2024	Tele2 Arena, Stockholm	1–2	5th	
2024–25	LP	Panathinaikos	Greece	7 November 2024	Tele2 Arena, Stockholm	2–1	5th	
2024–25	LP	The New Saints	Wales	28 November 2024	New Meadow, Shrewsbury	1–0	5th	
2024–25	LP	Víkingur Reykjavík	Iceland	12 December 2024	Kópavogsvöllur, Kópavogur	2–1	5th	
2024–25	LP	Legia Warsaw	Poland	19 December 2024	Tele2 Arena, Stockholm	3–1	5th	
2024–25	R16	Pafos	Cyprus	6 March 2025	Alphamega Stadium, Limassol	0–1	3–1	
2024–25	R16	Pafos	Cyprus	13 March 2025	3 Arena, Stockholm	3–0	3–1	
2024–25	QF	Rapid Wien	Austria	10 April 2025	3 Arena, Stockholm	0–1	4–2	
2024–25	QF	Rapid Wien	Austria	17 April 2025	Allianz Stadion, Vienna	4–1 (a.e.t.)	4–2	
2024–25	SF	Chelsea	England	1 May 2025	3 Arena, Stockholm	1–4	1–5	
2024–25	SF	Chelsea	England	8 May 2025	Stamford Bridge, London	0–1	1–5	

=== UEFA Cup Winners' Cup ===
Season	Stage	Opponent		Date	Venue	Score	Agg	Ref
Season	Stage	Team	Country	Date	Venue	Score	Agg	Ref
European Cup Winners' Cup
1975–76	1R	Wrexham	Wales	16 September 1975	Racecourse Ground, Wrexham	1–2	2–3	
1975–76	1R	Wrexham	Wales	30 September 1975	Stockholm Olympic Stadium, Stockholm	1–1	2–3	
1989–90	1R	US Luxembourg	Luxembourg	12 September 1989	Stade Achille Hammerel, Luxembourg	0–0	5–0	
1989–90	1R	US Luxembourg	Luxembourg	27 September 1989	Råsunda Stadium, Solna	5–0	5–0	
1989–90	2R	Real Valladolid	Spain	18 October 1989	Estadio Nuevo José Zorrilla, Valladolid	0–2	2–4	
1989–90	2R	Real Valladolid	Spain	1 November 1989	Råsunda Stadium, Solna	2–2	2–4	
1990–91	1R	Fram	Iceland	19 September 1990	Laugardalsvöllur, Reykjavík	0–3	1–4	
1990–91	1R	Fram	Iceland	3 October 1990	Råsunda Stadium, Solna	1–1	1–4	

=== UEFA Intertoto Cup ===
Season	Stage	Opponent		Date	Venue	Score	Agg	Ref
Season	Stage	Team	Country	Date	Venue	Score	Agg	Ref
1996	GS	LASK	Austria	22 June 1996	Union-Stadion, Wels	0–2	3rd	
1996	GS	Apollon Limassol	Cyprus	29 June 1996	Stockholm Olympic Stadium, Stockholm	8–0	3rd	
1996	GS	Werder Bremen	Germany	7 July 1996	Weserstadion, Bremen	2–3	3rd	
1996	GS	B68 Toftir	Faroe Islands	20 July 1996	Stockholm Olympic Stadium, Stockholm	5–1	3rd	

=== Non-UEFA matches ===
Tournament	Pld	W	D	L	GF	GA	GD	Win%
Inter-Cities Fairs Cup	4	0	1	3	4	12	−8	0.0
Intertoto Cup	78	22	12	44	99	155	−56	28.2
Nordic Cup	7	6	0	1	17	5	+12	85.7
Royal League	16	5	2	9	19	26	−7	31.3
Total	105	33	15	57	139	198	−59	31.4

==== Inter-Cities Fairs Cup ====
Season	Stage	Opponent		Date	Venue	Score	Agg	Ref
Season	Stage	Team	Country	Date	Venue	Score	Agg	Ref
1964–65	1R	Manchester United	England	23 September 1964	Råsunda Stadium, Solna	1–1	2–7	
1964–65	1R	Manchester United	England	27 October 1964	Old Trafford, Manchester	1–6	2–7	
1966–67	1R	Lokomotive Leipzig	East Germany	24 August 1966	Stockholm Olympic Stadium, Stockholm	1–3	2–5	
1966–67	1R	Lokomotive Leipzig	East Germany	27 September 1966	Zentralstadion, Leipzig	1–2	2–5	

==== Intertoto Cup ====
Season	Stage	Opponent		Date	Venue	Score	Agg	Ref
Season	Stage	Team	Country	Date	Venue	Score	Agg	Ref
1963–64	GS	Rapid Wien	Austria	23 June 1963	Stockholm Olympic Stadium, Stockholm	0–3	4th	
1963–64	GS	PSV	Netherlands	30 June 1963	(away)	0–2	4th	
1963–64	GS	VfR Neumünster	West Germany	7 July 1963	(away)	1–2	4th	
1963–64	GS	PSV	Netherlands	14 July 1963	(home)	0–1	4th	
1963–64	GS	VfR Neumünster	West Germany	21 July 1963	(home)	4–2	4th	
1963–64	GS	Rapid Wien	Austria	28 July 1963	(away)	1–3	4th	
1965–66	GS	Fortuna '54	Netherlands	18 June 1965	(home)	0–1	3rd	
1965–66	GS	Grasshopper Club	Switzerland	25 June 1965	(away)	2–4	3rd	
1965–66	GS	Kaiserslautern	West Germany	2 July 1965	(away)	3–0	3rd	
1965–66	GS	Kaiserslautern	West Germany	9 July 1965	(home)	1–1	3rd	
1965–66	GS	Grasshopper Club	Switzerland	17 July 1965	(home)	3–2	3rd	
1965–66	GS	Fortuna '54	Netherlands	23 July 1965	(away)	0–3	3rd	
1967	GS	Zagłębie Sosnowiec	Poland	1 July 1967	(home)	1–2	4th	
1967	GS	Schalke 04	West Germany	8 July 1967	(away)	0–2	4th	
1967	GS	Wacker Innsbruck	Austria	16 July 1967	(home)	0–7	4th	
1967	GS	Zagłębie Sosnowiec	Poland	22 July 1967	(away)	1–4	4th	
1967	GS	Schalke 04	West Germany	30 July 1967	(home)	4–1	4th	
1967	GS	Wacker Innsbruck	Austria	5 August 1967	(away)	0–2	4th	
1968	GS	Werder Bremen	West Germany	29 June 1968	(away)	2–1	3rd	
1968	GS	Szombierki Bytom	Poland	6 July 1968	(home)	4–2	3rd	
1968	GS	VSS Košice	Czechoslovakia	13 July 1968	(home)	0–1	3rd	
1968	GS	VSS Košice	Czechoslovakia	21 July 1968	(away)	2–3	3rd	
1968	GS	Szombierki Bytom	Poland	28 July 1968	(away)	1–3	3rd	
1968	GS	Werder Bremen	West Germany	3 August 1968	(home)	3–4	3rd	
1969	GS	Wiener SC	Austria	28 June 1969	(away)	0–6	4th	
1969	GS	Zagłębie Sosnowiec	Poland	5 July 1969	(away)	0–3	4th	
1969	GS	SpVgg Fürth	West Germany	12 July 1969	(home)	1–3	4th	
1969	GS	Wiener SC	Austria	19 July 1969	(home)	5–2	4th	
1969	GS	Zagłębie Sosnowiec	Poland	26 July 1969	(home)	2–1	4th	
1969	GS	SpVgg Fürth	West Germany	2 August 1969	(away)	1–1	4th	
1970	GS	Hannover 96	West Germany	23 May 1970	(home)	2–1	3rd	
1970	GS	Twente	Netherlands	27 May 1970	(away)	1–4	3rd	
1970	GS	Union Teplice	Czechoslovakia	31 May 1970	(home)	1–2	3rd	
1970	GS	Hannover 96	West Germany	6 June 1970	(away)	1–1	3rd	
1970	GS	Twente	Netherlands	13 June 1970	(home)	2–2	3rd	
1970	GS	Union Teplice	Czechoslovakia	21 June 1970	(away)	1–3	3rd	
1971	GS	Grasshopper Club	Switzerland	30 June 1971	(away)	2–0	2nd	
1971	GS	Austria Salzburg	Austria	3 July 1971	(home)	0–3	2nd	
1971	GS	Internacionál Slovnaft	Czechoslovakia	10 July 1971	(home)	2–3	2nd	
1971	GS	Grasshopper Club	Switzerland	17 July 1971	(home)	1–0	2nd	
1971	GS	Austria Salzburg	Austria	24 July 1971	(away)	1–1	2nd	
1971	GS	Internacionál Slovnaft	Czechoslovakia	31 July 1971	(away)	2–1	2nd	
1972	GS	Zürich	Switzerland	24 June 1972	(away)	0–0	4th	
1972	GS	Slovan Bratislava	Czechoslovakia	1 July 1972	(home)	2–3	4th	
1972	GS	First Vienna	Austria	8 July 1972	(home)	1–3	4th	
1972	GS	Slovan Bratislava	Czechoslovakia	15 July 1972	(away)	1–4	4th	
1972	GS	First Vienna	Austria	22 July 1972	(away)	0–3	4th	
1972	GS	Zürich	Switzerland	29 July 1972	(home)	2–1	4th	
1973	GS	Næstved	Denmark	30 June 1973	(away)	1–0	3rd	
1973	GS	Union Teplice	Czechoslovakia	7 July 1973	(away)	1–1	3rd	
1973	GS	Austria Klagenfurt	Austria	14 July 1973	(away)	0–2	3rd	
1973	GS	Union Teplice	Czechoslovakia	21 July 1973	(home)	1–6	3rd	
1973	GS	Austria Klagenfurt	Austria	28 July 1973	(home)	2–0	3rd	
1973	GS	Næstved	Denmark	4 August 1973	(home)	1–1	3rd	
1974	GS	Hamburger SV	West Germany	23 June 1974	(home)	1–3	3rd	
1974	GS	Vitória de Guimarães	Portugal	29 June 1974	(away)	0–5	3rd	
1974	GS	Neuchâtel Xamax	Switzerland	6 July 1974	(home)	4–2	3rd	
1974	GS	Hamburger SV	West Germany	13 July 1974	(away)	0–2	3rd	
1974	GS	Vitória de Guimarães	Portugal	20 July 1974	(home)	3–1	3rd	
1974	GS	Neuchâtel Xamax	Switzerland	27 July 1974	(away)	1–1	3rd	
1976	GS	ROW Rybnik	Poland	26 June 1976	(home)	3–0	1st	
1976	GS	Sturm Graz	Austria	3 July 1976	(away)	0–1	1st	
1976	GS	St. Gallen	Switzerland	10 July 1976	(home)	3–2	1st	
1976	GS	St. Gallen	Switzerland	17 July 1976	(away)	0–0	1st	
1976	GS	Sturm Graz	Austria	24 July 1976	(home)	3–0	1st	
1976	GS	ROW Rybnik	Poland	31 July 1976	(away)	2–5	1st	
1989	GS	Stal Mielec	Poland	5 July 1989	(home)	1–4	4th	
1989	GS	Stuttgarter Kickers	West Germany	8 July 1989	(home)	0–1	4th	
1989	GS	Stuttgarter Kickers	West Germany	12 July 1989	(away)	0–0	4th	
1989	GS	Næstved	Denmark	15 July 1989	(away)	2–0	4th	
1989	GS	Stal Mielec	Poland	19 July 1989	(away)	0–1	4th	
1989	GS	Næstved	Denmark	22 July 1989	(home)	1–2	4th	
1991	GS	Austria Wien	Austria	29 June 1991	(away)	0–1	3rd	
1991	GS	Union Cheb	Czechoslovakia	3 July 1991	(home)	0–0	3rd	
1991	GS	B. 1903	Denmark	6 July 1991	(home)	1–2	3rd	
1991	GS	B. 1903	Denmark	13 July 1991	(away)	3–2	3rd	
1991	GS	Union Cheb	Czechoslovakia	10 July 1991	(away)	0–1	3rd	
1991	GS	Austria Wien	Austria	17 July 1991	(home)	1–2	3rd	

==== Nordic Cup ====
Season	Stage	Opponent		Date	Venue	Score	Agg	Ref
Season	Stage	Team	Country	Date	Venue	Score	Agg	Ref
1959–62	R16	Skovshoved	Denmark	4 August 1959	Parken, Copenhagen	3–0	8–1	
1959–62	R16	Skovshoved	Denmark	8 September 1959	Råsunda Stadium, Solna	5–1	8–1	
1959–62	QF	KB	Denmark	20 October 1959	Råsunda Stadium, Solna	1–0	2–0	
1959–62	QF	KB	Denmark	1 June 1960	Parken, Copenhagen	1–0	2–0	
1959–62	SF	IFK Norrköping	Sweden	9 April 1961	Idrottsparken, Norrköping	2–0	7–3	
1959–62	SF	IFK Norrköping	Sweden	25 June 1962	Råsunda Stadium, Solna	5–3	7–3	
1959–62	Final	Helsinki-Alliance	Finland	31 July 1962	Stockholm Olympic Stadium, Stockholm	0–1		

==== Royal League ====
Season	Stage	Opponent		Date	Venue	Score	Agg	Ref
Season	Stage	Team	Country	Date	Venue	Score	Agg	Ref
2004–05	GS	Rosenborg	Norway	11 November 2004	Lerkendal stadion, Trondheim	4–4	4th	
2004–05	GS	Vålerenga	Norway	2 December 2004	Vallhall Arena, Oslo	1–3	4th	
2004–05	GS	Esbjerg	Denmark	5 December 2004	Råsunda Stadium, Solna	0–3	4th	
2004–05	GS	Vålerenga	Norway	12 February 2005	Råsunda Stadium, Solna	0–1	4th	
2004–05	GS	Esbjerg	Denmark	17 February 2005	Esbjerg Idrætspark, Esbjerg	0–1	4th	
2004–05	GS	Rosenborg	Norway	24 February 2005	Råsunda Stadium, Solna	0–1	4th	
2005–06	GS	AaB	Denmark	24 November 2005	Aalborg Stadion, Aalborg	3–1	1st	
2005–06	GS	IFK Göteborg	Sweden	27 November 2005	Södertälje Fotbollsarena, Södertälje	0–1	1st	
2005–06	GS	Lyn	Norway	8 December 2005	Ullevaal stadion, Oslo	2–1	1st	
2005–06	GS	AaB	Denmark	13 December 2005	Södertälje Fotbollsarena, Södertälje	2–1	1st	
2005–06	GS	IFK Göteborg	Sweden	12 February 2006	Nya Ullevi, Gothenburg	0–2	1st	
2005–06	GS	Lyn	Norway	16 February 2006	Södertälje Fotbollsarena, Södertälje	1–1	1st	
2005–06	QF	Vålerenga	Norway	23 February 2006	Södertälje Fotbollsarena, Södertälje	2–1	5–2	
2005–06	QF	Vålerenga	Norway	9 March 2006	Tønsberg Gressbane, Tønsberg	3–1	5–2	
2005–06	SF	Lillestrøm	Norway	16 March 2006	Södertälje Fotbollsarena, Södertälje	1–3	1–4	
2005–06	SF	Lillestrøm	Norway	26 March 2006	Åråsen stadion, Lillestrøm	0–1	1–4	
