= Charles Gustafsson =

Swedish footballer

Personal information
- Full name: Charles Gustafsson
- Date of birth: 25 December 1932 (age 93)
- Place of birth: Kristianstad, Sweden
- Position: Midfielder

Senior career*
Years	Team	Apps	(Gls)
1946–1949	Önnestads BI		
1949–1954	IFK Kristianstad		
1954–1961	Malmö FF	108	(96)
1962	Borrby IF		

International career
1955–1957	Sweden	2	(0)

Managerial career
- Örtofta IS
- * Club domestic league appearances and goals

Charles Gustafsson (born 25 December 1932) is a Swedish former footballer who played as a midfielder.

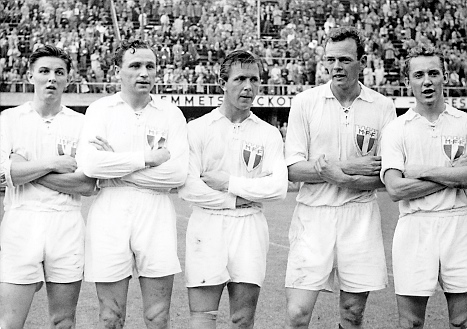
Malmö FF players in 1955: from left Charles Gustafsson, Henry Thillberg, Nils-Åke Sandell, Bengt Lindskog and Bertil Nilsson.
