= Nils-Åke Sandell =

Swedish footballer and manager

Personal information
- Full name: Nils-Åke Sandell
- Date of birth: 5 February 1927
- Place of birth: Lund, Sweden
- Date of death: 29 May 1992 (aged 65)
- Position: Striker

Senior career*
Years	Team	Apps	(Gls)
1943–1949	Lunds BK	?	(?)
1949–1951	IFK Malmö	60	(73)
1951–1952	Lunds BK	?	(?)
1952–1956	Malmö FF	68	(62)
1956–1958	SPAL 1907	49	(13)
1958–1959	Malmö FF	4	(2)

International career
1952–1956	Sweden	20	(20)

Managerial career
- 1959–1963: Malmö FF
- Skurups AIF
- Lunds BK
- Lunds BoIS
- Tomelilla IF
- Ystads IF
- IFK Trelleborg
- 1980–1982: IFK Malmö
- * Club domestic league appearances and goals

Nils-Åke Sandell (5 February 1927 – 29 May 1992) was a Swedish footballer and manager.

== Club career ==
Sandell grew up in the working class area of Väster in Lund, and started his playing career with his local club Lunds BK, where two of his uncles worked. He made his debut at the age of 16, and was a prolific goalscorer in the third tier. After a brief period at IFK Malmö, he returned to Lunds BK, before moving to Malmö FF for the 1952 season. On 9 October 1955, he scored Malmö FF's 1000th Allsvenskan goal in a 5–1 win against Norrby IF. After spending 4 years with Malmö FF, Sandell had garnered a reputation for being a goalscorer and tried his luck in Italy and SPAL 1907. After his period in Italy, Sandell returned to Malmö FF and played one last season in 1958.

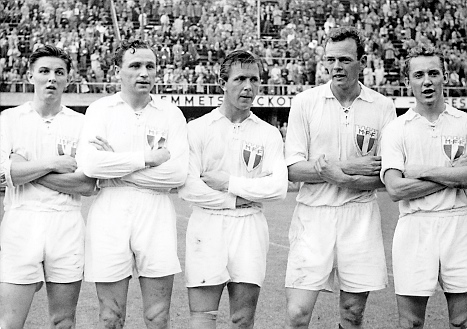
Malmö FF players in 1955: from left Charles Gustafsson, Henry Thillberg, Nils-Åke Sandell, Bengt Lindskog and Bertil Nilsson.

== International career ==
He played a crucial role in Sweden's triumph at the 1952–55 Nordic Football Championship, being the top goal scorer of the tournament with 10 goals in 8 caps, and he was also part of Sweden's squad for the football tournament at the 1952 Summer Olympics, but he did not play in any matches.

== Managerial career ==
After returning from Italy and playing in the final of games of the 1958 season, Sandell was asked by chairman Eric Persson to become manager of Malmö FF. He managed the club from 1959 to 1963 winning no titles. Sandell's managerial career continued at regional clubs in Skåne, and he finished his career at IFK Malmö, nearly managing to promote them to Allsvenskan in 1980.

== Honours ==
Sweden

- Summer Olympics bronze medal: 1952
- Nordic Football Championship: 1952–1955

Individual

- Nordic Football Championship top scorer: 1952–1955

== Sources ==
- Malmström, Håkan (2010). 100 MFF:ARE. Sydsvenska Dagbladets AB. pp. 100–101. ISBN 978-91-85319-71-8.
