= Lars Pettersson =

Lars Pettersson may refer to:

- Lars Pettersson (canoeist), Swedish sprint canoer
- Lars Pettersson (ice hockey), Swedish ice hockey and bandy player
- Lars Pettersson (footballer), Swedish footballer
