= Curt Hansen =

Curt, Kurt, or Curtis Hansen or Hanson is the name of:

- Curt Hansen (chess player) (born 1964), Danish chess Grandmaster
- Curt Hansen (actor) (born 1987), American actor and singer
- Curt Hanson (1943–2017), Iowa politician
- Curtis Hanson (1945–2016), filmmaker
- Curtis LeRoy Hansen (1933–2023), American judge
- Curtis Hanson, an actor who appeared in The Goonies
- Kurt Hansen (speedway rider), in 1986 Individual Speedway World Championship
- Kurt Hansen (footballer, born 1951), Danish footballer
- Kurt Hansen (footballer, born 1928)
- Kurt Hanson from National Outdoor Book Award
