= Bengt Lindskog =

Swedish footballer

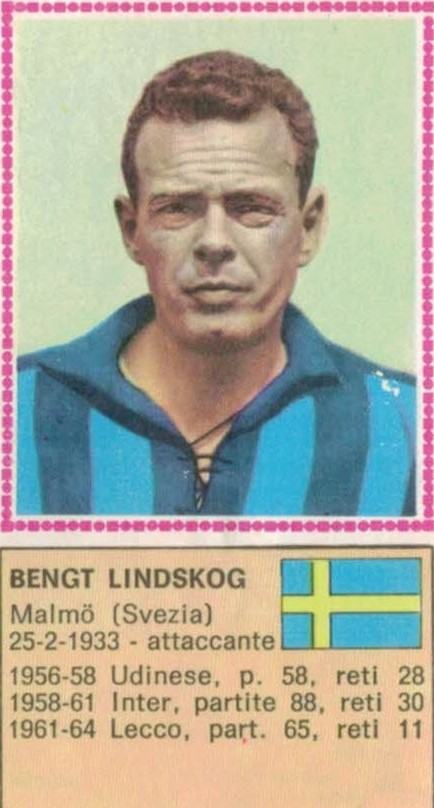

Personal information
- Date of birth: 25 February 1933
- Place of birth: Furulund, Sweden
- Date of death: 27 January 2008 (aged 74)
- Position: Midfielder

Senior career*
Years	Team	Apps	(Gls)
1952–1955	Helsingborg	40	(14)
1955–1956	Malmö FF	19	(13)
1956–1958	Udinese	58	(28)
1958–1961	Inter Milan	88	(32)
1961–1964	Lecco	65	(11)
1965–1967	IFK Malmö		
Total		270+	(98+)

International career
1955–1965	Sweden	14	(1)
- * Club domestic league appearances and goals

Bengt Lindskog (25 February 1933 – 27 January 2008) was a Swedish footballer who played at both professional and international levels, as a midfielder.

== Career ==
=== Club career ===
Born in Furulund, Lindskog played club football in Sweden and Italy for Helsingborg, Malmö FF, Udinese, Inter Milan, Lecco and IFK Malmö.

=== International career ===
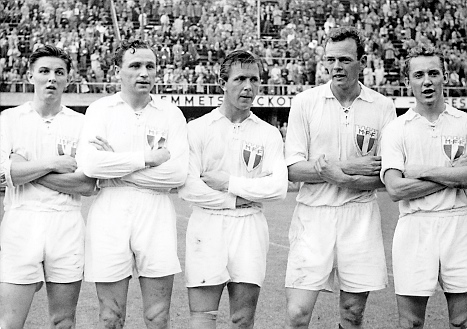
Malmö FF players in 1955: from left Charles Gustafsson, Henry Thillberg, Nils-Åke Sandell, Bengt Lindskog and Bertil Nilsson.

Lindskog earned 14 caps for the Sweden national team between 1955 and 1965. Before the 1958 World Cup, which was held on home soil in Sweden, Lindskog transferred from Udinese to Inter; his new contract did not allow him to participate in the tournament. He did, however, participate in qualifying matches for the 1966 World Cup.
