= Täby IS =

Swedish sports club

- Full name: Täby Idrottssällskap
- Founded: 1923

Täby IS is a Swedish cross-country skiing, track and field athletics and non-competitive floorball team from Täby outside Stockholm. The club also had a football section which in 2012 merged with IFK Täby to form Täby FK.

== Background ==
Täby IS's football section played its last season in Division 4 Stockholm Norra which is the sixth tier of Swedish football. They played their home matches at the Tibblevallen in Täby. Notable former Täby IS players include Kenneth Italiener, Magnus Eriksson, Andrés Thorleifsson, and Daniel Sundgren. They are now operating as Täby FK.

The club was affiliated to Stockholms Fotbollförbund.

== Season to season ==
Season	Level	Division	Section	Position	Movements
2006*	Tier 6	Division 4	Stockholm Norra	2nd	Promotion Playoffs – Promoted
2007	Tier 5	Division 3	Norra Svealand	5th	
2008	Tier 5	Division 3	Norra Svealand	4th	
2009	Tier 5	Division 3	Norra Svealand	5th	
2010	Tier 5	Division 3	Norra Svealand	11th	Relegated
2011	Tier 6	Division 4	Stockholm Norra		

* League restructuring in 2006 resulted in a new division being created at Tier 3 and subsequent divisions dropping a level.
