= Arne Kotte =

Norwegian footballer (1935-2015)

Personal information
- Date of birth: 20 March 1935
- Place of birth: Steinkjer, Norway
- Date of death: 8 July 2015 (aged 80)
- Place of death: Steinkjer, Norway
- Position: Forward

Youth career
- Steinkjer

Senior career*
Years	Team	Apps	(Gls)
1951–1952	Steinkjer		
1952–1955	Vålerenga		
1955–1956	Steinkjer		
1956–1957	Palermo	0	(0)
1958–1960	Frigg Oslo		
1960–1965	Steinkjer		

International career
1953–1954	Norway U21	3	(3)
1953	Norway B	1	(0)
1953–1961	Norway	19	(3)
- * Club domestic league appearances and goals

Arne Kotte (20 March 1935 – 8 July 2015) was a Norwegian footballer who played as a forward.

He was active at club level in Norway and Italy, and he represented Norway at senior international level.

== Career ==
Born in Steinkjer, Kotte played for Steinkjer, Vålerenga, Palermo and Frigg Oslo. He started his career with Steinkjer, before moving to Oslo in the summer of 1952 where he joined Vålerenga. He played three seasons for the Oslo club before returning to Steinkjer in the summer of 1955.

On 12 August 1956, Kotte signed a professional contract with Italian team Palermo. By doing so he became the first professional footballer from Steinkjer to play abroad. However, he suffered a knee injury five minutes into his first Palermo training match, which put him out of action for six months. He was eventually released by the club due to them filling their quota of foreign players after they signed Argentine Santiago Vernazza as a replacement for him. He had a trial with Spanish club Barcelona in the autumn of 1957, where he played three friendly matches, but the trial spell was cut short because of the knee injury, and he was not offered a contract by Barcelona.

Kotte returned to Norway in late 1957, and subsequently joined Frigg ahead of the 1958 season. He played three seasons for the Oslo club before once again moving back to Steinkjer, where he played out the remainder of his career before retiring as a player in 1965.

He won 19 international caps for Norway between 1953 and 1961, scoring three goals. One of his caps was earned in a FIFA World Cup qualifying match. He also played for Norway at under-21 and B level.

== Later life and death ==
After retiring from playing in 1965, Kotte was active as a coach and referee. Kotte died in Steinkjer on 8 July 2015.

== Career statistics ==
=== International goals ===
#	Date	Venue	Opponent	Score	Result	Competition
1.	25 May 1955	Bislett Stadium, Oslo, Norway	Republic of Ireland	1–3	Loss	Friendly
2.	25 September 1955	Råsunda Stadium, Solna, Sweden	Sweden	1–1	Draw	1952–55 Nordic Cup
3.	5 November 1961	Empire Stadium, Gżira, Malta	Malta	1–1	Draw	Friendly
Correct as of 9 March 2017
