= Andrés Thorleifsson =

Icelandic-born Swedish footballer

Personal information
- Full name: Andrés Thorlacius; Thorleifsson
- Date of birth: 19 July 1988 (age 38)
- Place of birth: Iceland
- Height: 1.92 m (6 ft 3 1/2 in)
- Position: Forward

Youth career
- 1993–2002: Riala GoIF
- 2003–2004: IK Sirius
- 2005–2006: AIK

Senior career*
Years	Team	Apps	(Gls)
2007	FC Väsby United	1	(0)
2008	Täby IS	3	(0)
2009	Råsunda IS	9	(0)
2010	Sollentuna United FF	0	(0)
2010–2012	Riala GoIF	49	(81)
2012	→ Riala GoIF 2	0	(0)
2013	BKV Norrtälje	21	(27)
2014	Falkenbergs FF	7	(0)
2015–	Riala GoIF	0	(0)

Managerial career
- 2015–: Riala GoIF
- * Club domestic league appearances and goals as of 1 November 2014

Andrés Thorlacius Thorleifsson (born 19 July 1988) is a Swedish footballer who plays for Riala GoIF as a defender. He used to be a striker, but moved back to the defender position when he ended his professional career 2014.
