= Kenneth Maron =

Swedish footballer

Personal information
- Full name: Kenneth André Maron; Kenneth André Italiener
- Date of birth: 16 June 1973 (age 53)
- Place of birth: Täby, Sweden
- Positions: Defender; midfielder

Youth career
- Täby IS

Senior career*
Years	Team	Apps	(Gls)
–1994	Täby IS		
1994–1995	Djurgårdens IF	14	(0)
1996–?	Älvsjö AIK		
?–2005	IFK Täby		
2006–?	Täby IS		
- * Club domestic league appearances and goals

Kenneth André Maron (later Kenneth André Italiener; born 16 June 1973) is a Swedish former footballer who played as a defender and midfielder, most notably for Djurgårdens IF in Allsvenskan.

== Playing career ==
=== Täby IS ===
Maron started off his career with his hometown team Täby IS. In 1993, Täby IS was a mid-table team in Division 3 Norra Svealand when they were drawn to play the Division 1 Norra team Djurgårdens IF in the 1993–94 Svenska Cupen. Djurgården ended up winning the game 2–1, but Maron put in such an impressive performance for Täby that Djurgården decided to sign him for the upcoming 1994 Division 1 Norra season.

=== Djurgårdens IF ===
In 1994, Maron played in nine league games as Djurgården won the Division 1 Norra title and was promoted to Allsvenskan. During the 1995 Allsvenskan season, he played in five league games for Djurgården as his team finished sixth in the table and qualified for the 1996 UEFA Intertoto Cup group stage.

=== Later career ===
Maron left Djurgården after the 1995 season and signed for Älvsjö AIK in Division 2 Västra Svealand in January 1996. He would later go on to represent both IFK Täby and Täby IS.

== Honours ==
Djurgårdens IF

- Division 1 Norra: 1994
