= Matti Hiltunen =

Finnish footballer (born 1933)

Personal information
- Date of birth: 26 January 1933 (age 93)
- Position: Forward

International career
| Years | Team | Apps | (Gls) |
| 1953–1963 | Finland | 19 | (5) |

Matti Hiltunen (born 26 January 1933) is a Finnish footballer who played as a forward in 19 matches for the Finland national team from 1953 to 1963. He was also named in Finland's squad for the Group 2 qualification tournament for the 1954 FIFA World Cup.
