= Allan Fredberg =

Swedish footballer

Personal information
- Place of birth: Sweden

Senior career*
Years	Team	Apps	(Gls)
	Djurgården	16	(0)
- * Club domestic league appearances and goals

Allan Fredberg is a Swedish retired footballer. He made 16 Allsvenskan appearances for Djurgården in the 1930s.
