= Sixten Sandberg =

Swedish footballer

Senior career*
Years	Team	Apps	(Gls)
- Djurgården
- * Club domestic league appearances and goals

Sixten Sandberg is a Swedish retired footballer. Sandberg made 17 Allsvenskan appearances for Djurgården and scored 5 goals.
