= Leif Aronsson =

Swedish footballer (1938–1987)

Personal information
- Full name: Leif Aronsson
- Date of birth: 27 January 1938
- Place of birth: Karlskoga, Sweden
- Date of death: 17 January 1987 (aged 48)
- Place of death: Degerfors, Sweden
- Position: Winger

Senior career*
Years	Team	Apps	(Gls)
–1958	Degerfors IF		
1959	Djurgårdens IF	1	(0)
1959–1971	Degerfors IF		
1972–1980	Hova IF		
1981–1982	Bäckhammars SK		

International career
	Sweden U23	8	(1)
	Sweden B	5	(1)
1962	Sweden	1	(0)
- * Club domestic league appearances and goals

Leif Aronsson (27 January 1938 – 17 January 1987) was a Swedish footballer. He made one appearance for Sweden, 134 Allsvenskan appearances for Degerfors IF and one Allsvenskan appearance for Djurgårdens IF. He was the brother of fellow footballer Jan Aronsson.
