= Roger Lindevall =

Swedish footballer

Senior career*
Years	Team	Apps	(Gls)
- Djurgården
- * Club domestic league appearances and goals

Roger Lindevall is a Swedish retired footballer. Lindevall made 19 Allsvenskan appearances for Djurgården and scored one goal.
