= Bent Sørensen (footballer) =

Danish footballer (1926–2011)

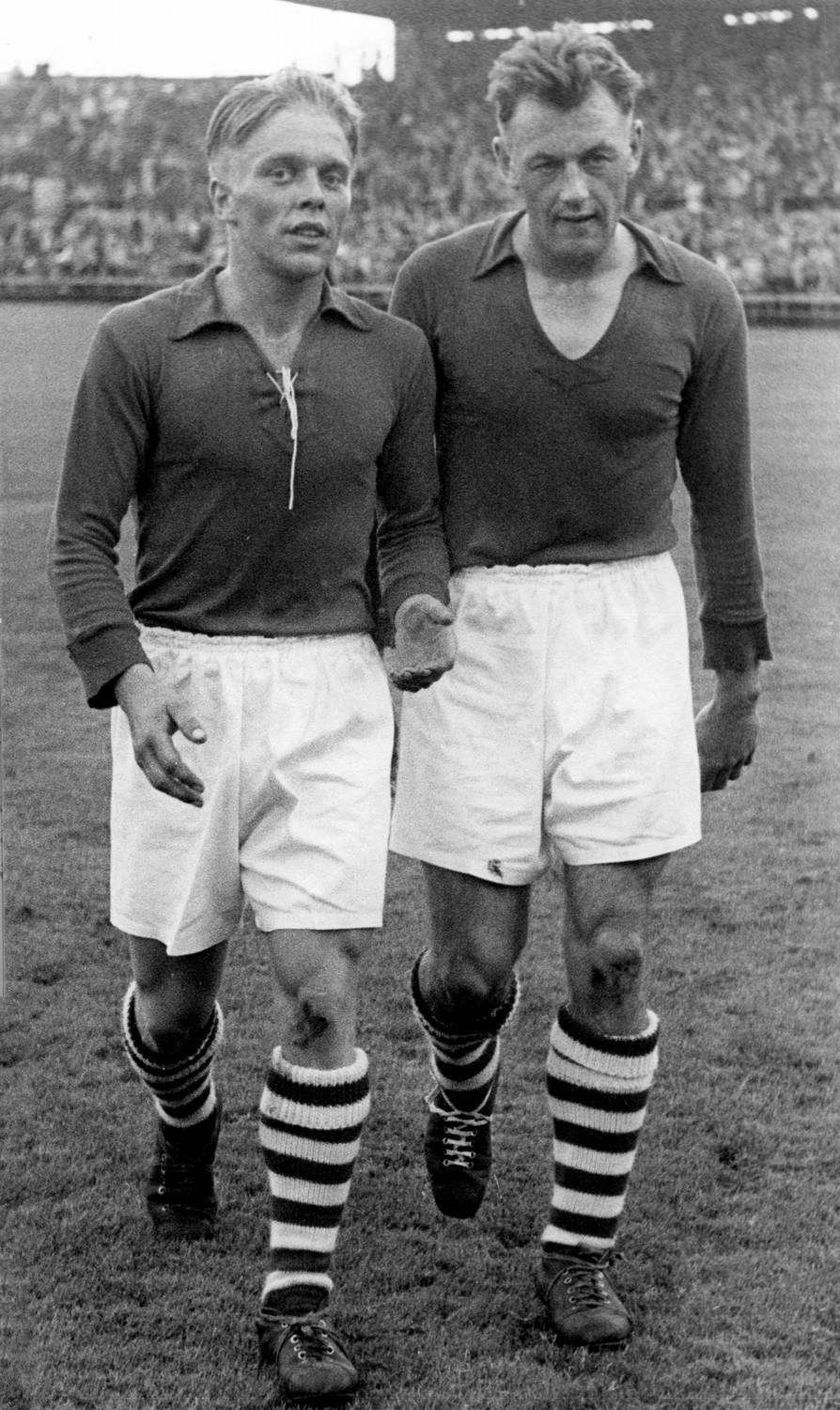
- Sørensen (right) in 1953

Personal information
- Full name: Tommy Brian Troelsen
- Date of birth: 23 June 1926
- Place of birth: Vejle, Denmark
- Date of death: 25 June 2011 (aged 85)
- Position: Striker

Youth career
- Vejle Boldklub

Senior career*
Years	Team	Apps	(Gls)
194?–1957	Vejle Boldklub	200	(157)
- Grenå IF

International career^{‡}
	Denmark B	4	(1)
1953–1957	Danmark A	6	(3)
- * Club domestic league appearances and goals as of 22:16, 19 May 2008 (UTC) ‡ National team caps and goals as of 23 May 2008

Bent Nørgaard Sørensen (23 June 1926 – 25 June 2011) was a Danish footballer who most notably played for Vejle Boldklub.

== Profile ==
Sørensen played most of his career for Vejle Boldklub, where he was the all-time top scorer with 157 goals in 200 matches. In 1956 he wrote club history scoring the winner, as Vejle Boldklub for the first time qualified for the best Danish league. In September 1958 he became VB's first Danish international player. He made his debut against Norway and scored the only goal of the match.
