= Täby FK =

Swedish football club

- Full name: Täby Fotbollsklubb
- Nickname: TFK
- Founded: 2012; 14 years ago
- Ground: Tibblevallen, Täby or Vikingavallen, Täby
- Capacity: Tibblevallen (2000) Vikingavallen (2750)
- League: Division 2 Norra Svealand
- 2024: Ettan Norra, 15th of 16
Home colours

Täby FK is a Swedish football club based in Täby, Stockholm.

== History ==
The club was founded in 2012 when the football sections of Täby IS and IFK Täby merged. In 2019 they won Division 2 Norra Svealand and gained promotion to Division 1, the third highest league, where they will be playing in 2020. During the 2020/21 season, the club reached its highest position ever 11th in Division 1 Norra with a young and talented squad where the oldest player was their captain at 23 years old.

== Season to season ==
Season	Level	Division	Section	Position	Movements
2019	Tier 4	Division 2		1st	Promoted
2020	Tier 3	Division 1	Norra	11th	
2021	Tier 3	Division 1	Norra	13th	

== Current squad ==
As of 7 February 2025

Note: Flags indicate national team as defined under FIFA eligibility rules; some limited exceptions apply. Players may hold more than one non-FIFA nationality.

No.	Pos.	Nation	Player
1	MF	SUI	Tyron Zecchin
2	DF	SWE	Yusuf Aksoy
3	DF	SWE	Noel Berg
4	DF	SWE	Erik Johansson Olsson]
5	DF	SWE	Abiel Sequar
6	MF	SWE	Erik Kask
9	FW	SWE	Albin Linnér
12	DF	SWE	Conrad Johansson
16	MF	SWE	William Hjälte
17	MF	SWE	Adam Rissel

No.	Pos.	Nation	Player
18	MF	SWE	Philip De Fine Licht
19	FW	SWE	Viktor Sluug
20	MF	SWE	Gabriel Kalaitzidis
22	FW	SWE	De Bievre Ilunga
23	MF	SWE	Léon Sy Birgersson
27	MF	SWE	Adam Zenzén
35	GK	SWE	Leo Iacobaeus
—	DF	SWE	Victor Danev
—	MF	GHA	Glorie Kabundu
—	FW	SWE	Ekin Bulut
