= Verner Nielsen =

Danish footballer (1931–2023)

Eigil Verner Nielsen
Personal information
- Date of birth: 14 May 1931
- Place of birth: Nørresundby, Denmark
- Date of death: 22 February 2023 (aged 91)
- Position(s): Defender

Eigil Verner Nielsen (14 May 1931 – 22 February 2023) was a Danish football player in the defender position, who played 26 games for the Denmark national football team.

== Biography ==
Nielsen was born in Nørresundby, and was spotted by Knud Lundberg, coach of Copenhagen club Akademisk Boldklub (AB), during a summer trip to northern Jutland. Nielsen became the first player with no academic background to play for AB, where he gained popularity due to his fighting spirit and technique. He made his debut for the Danish national team in September 1955.

After ending his active career, he ran an auto repair shop, but continued to play football even after he turned 75. He died on 22 February 2023, at the age of 91.
