= Stefan Rexin =

Swedish footballer (1957–2019)

Senior career*
Years	Team	Apps	(Gls)
- Djurgården
- * Club domestic league appearances and goals

Stefan Rexin (29 June 1957 – May 2019) was a Swedish footballer. Rexin made 1 Allsvenskan appearances for Djurgården 1986 and scored 0 goals.
