= Bo Björkman =

Swedish footballer

Senior career*
Years	Team	Apps	(Gls)
- Djurgården
- * Club domestic league appearances and goals

Bo Björkman is a Swedish retired footballer. Björkman made 24 Allsvenskan appearances for Djurgården and scored 9 goals.
