= Stefan Hermansson =

Swedish footballer

Personal information
- Date of birth: 3 June 1961 (age 65)

Senior career*
Years	Team	Apps	(Gls)
1986–1987	Djurgården	18	(3)
- * Club domestic league appearances and goals

Stefan Hermansson (born 3 June 1961) is a Swedish retired footballer. Hermansson made 13 Allsvenskan appearances for Djurgården and scored 1 goal.
