= Jørgen Jacobsen =

Danish footballer (1933-2010)

Personal information
- Date of birth: 14 October 1933
- Date of death: 26 August 2010 (aged 76)

International career
Years	Team	Apps	(Gls)
1954–1955	Denmark	3	(1)

Jørgen Jacobsen (14 October 1933 – 26 August 2010) was a Danish footballer. He played in three matches for the Denmark national football team from 1954 to 1955.
