= Erik Køppen =

Danish footballer (1923–2019)

Personal information
- Date of birth: 9 March 1923
- Place of birth: Copenhagen, Denmark
- Date of death: 10 November 2019 (aged 96)
- Position: Right-back

Senior career*
Years	Team	Apps	(Gls)
1941–1958	Kjøbenhavns Boldklub		

International career
1949–1956	Denmark	21	(0)
- * Club domestic league appearances and goals

Erik Køppen (9 March 1923 – 10 November 2019) was a Danish footballer who played as a right-back. He made 21 appearances for the Denmark national team from 1949 to 1956.
