= Nils Rikberg =

Finnish footballer (1928-2002)

Personal information
- Full name: Nils Bertil Rikberg
- Date of birth: 29 March 1928
- Place of birth: Pernå, Finland
- Date of death: 10 August 2002 (aged 74)
- Place of death: Turku, Finland
- Position: Striker

Senior career*
Years	Team	Apps	(Gls)
1951	Loviisan Tor		
1952-1953	Kotkan Jäntevä	35	(24)
1953–1954	Toulouse	4	(2)
1954–1957	Sète	51	(7)
1960–1961, 1964-1965	Åbo IFK		(10)

International career
1952–1960	Finland	15	(7)
- * Club domestic league appearances and goals

Nils Bertil Rikberg (29 March 1928 in Pernå – 10 August 2002 in Turku) was a Finnish footballer who competed in the 1952 Summer Olympics. He became one of the first professional footballers of Finland when he transferred to France in 1953.
