= Bengt Meijer =

Swedish footballer

Senior career*
Years	Team	Apps	(Gls)
- Djurgården
- * Club domestic league appearances and goals

Bengt Meijer is a Swedish retired footballer who made sixteen Allsvenskan appearances for Djurgården and scored three goals.
