= Herman Nordegren =

Swedish footballer

Senior career*
Years	Team	Apps	(Gls)
- Djurgården
- * Club domestic league appearances and goals

Herman Nordegren is a Swedish retired footballer. Nordegren made 19 Allsvenskan appearances for Djurgården and scored 0 goals.
