= Knut Hallberg =

Swedish football manager

Managerial career
- Years: Team
- 1959: Djurgårdens IF

Knut Hallberg is a Swedish football manager. He was Djurgårdens IF manager in 1959 together with Birger Sandberg.
