= Lars Eriksson (footballer, born 1926) =

Swedish footballer

Personal information
- Date of birth: 6 February 1926
- Place of birth: Hofors, Sweden
- Date of death: 1 February 1994 (aged 67)
- Height: 1.81 m (5 ft 11 in)
- Position: Midfielder

Senior career*
Years	Team	Apps	(Gls)
1951–1953	Degerfors	36	(17)
1954	FC Sète	12	(2)
1954–1955	Toulouse	18	(3)
1955–1956	FC Sète	30	(6)
1956–1958	Grenoble	52	(10)
1957–1959	Sandvikens IF	20	(1)

International career
1952–1953	Sweden	10	(2)
- * Club domestic league appearances and goals

Lars Eriksson (6 February 1926 – 1 February 1994) was a Swedish footballer who played as a midfielder.

== Career ==
He made ten appearances for the Sweden national team from 1952 to 1953. He was also part of Sweden's squad for the football tournament at the 1952 Summer Olympics, but he did not play in any matches.
