= Seppo Pelkonen =

Finnish footballer (1930-2008)

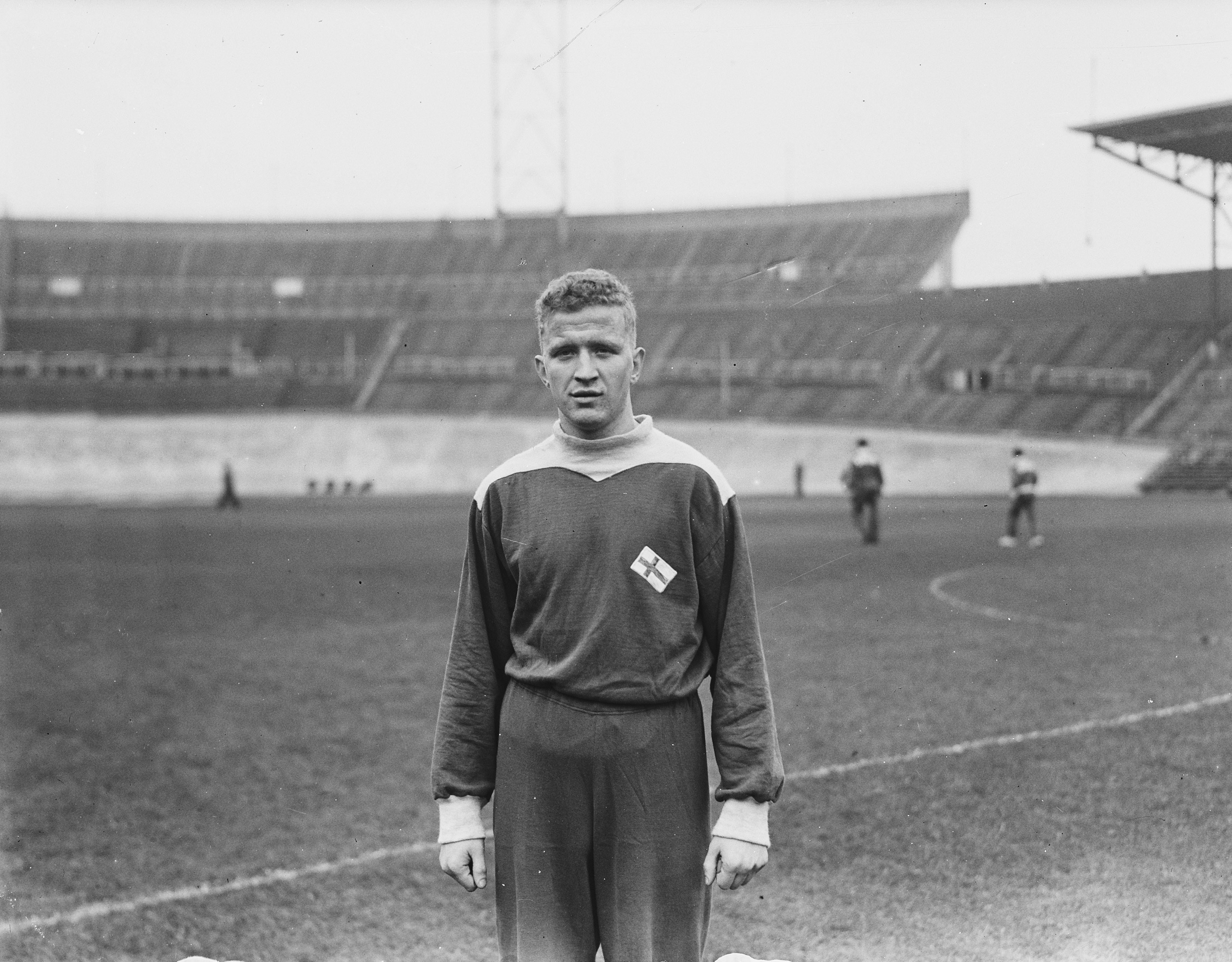
- Pelkonen in 1951

Personal information
- Date of birth: 13 April 1930
- Date of death: 11 September 2008 (aged 78)
- Position: Midfielder

International career
Years	Team	Apps	(Gls)
1951–1955	Finland	16	(2)

Seppo Pelkonen (13 April 1930 – 11 September 2008) was a Finnish footballer. He played in 16 matches for the Finland national football team from 1951 to 1955. He was also part of Finland's team at the 1952 Summer Olympics, and for their qualification matches for the 1954 FIFA World Cup.
