= Rikard Andersson =

Swedish footballer

Senior career*
Years	Team	Apps	(Gls)
- Djurgården
- * Club domestic league appearances and goals

Rikard Andersson is a Swedish retired footballer. Andersson made 17 Svenska Serien and Allsvenskan appearances for Djurgården and scored 0 goals.
