= Pål Angell-Hansen =

Norwegian footballer (1925-1990)

Personal information
- Date of birth: 16 May 1925
- Date of death: 23 September 1990 (aged 65)
- Position: Forward

International career
Years	Team	Apps	(Gls)
1953	Norway	1	(1)

Pål Angell-Hansen (16 May 1925 – 23 September 1990) was a Norwegian footballer. He played in one match for the Norway national football team in 1953.
