= Tor Jevne =

Norwegian footballer (1928-2001)

Personal information
- Date of birth: 21 November 1928
- Place of birth: Lillehammer, Norway
- Date of death: 24 May 2001 (aged 72)
- Position: Forward

International career
Years	Team	Apps	(Gls)
1952–1953	Norway	1	(0)

Tor Jevne (21 November 1928 – 24 May 2001) was a Norwegian footballer. He played in three matches for the Norway national football team from 1952 to 1953. He was also part of Norway's squad for the 1952 Summer Olympics, but he did not play in any matches.
