= Anders Westerholm =

Finnish footballer (1937-2004)

Personal information
- Date of birth: 1 September 1937
- Date of death: 2004 (aged 66–67)

International career
Years	Team	Apps	(Gls)
1959–1961	Finland	9	(0)

Anders Westerholm (1 September 1937 – 2004) was a Finnish footballer. He played in nine matches for the Finland national football team from 1959 to 1961.
