= Hannu Kankkonen =

Finnish footballer (1934–2013)

Personal information
- Date of birth: 26 January 1934
- Date of death: 23 September 2013 (aged 79)
- Position: Centre forward

International career
Years	Team	Apps	(Gls)
1954–1964	Finland	23	(5)

Hannu Kankkonen (26 January 1934 – 23 September 2013) was a Finnish footballer who played as a centre forward. He made 23 appearances for the Finland national team from 1954 to 1964. He played for Barry Town in 1960
