= Birger Sandberg =

Swedish footballer and manager (1918–1998)

Personal information
- Date of birth: 19 February 1918
- Date of death: 26 August 1998 (aged 80)

Managerial career
- Years: Team
- 1959: Djurgårdens IF

Birger "Farsan" Sandberg (18 February 1918 – 28 June 1998) was a Swedish football player and manager. He was Djurgårdens IF manager in 1959 together with Knut Hallberg.
