= Åke Rydberg =

Swedish footballer and ice hockey player (born 1938)

- Born: 3 September 1938 (age 87) Kalmar, Sweden
- Shot: Left
- Played for: Djurgården
- Playing career: 1955–1964

Åke Rydberg (born 3 September 1938) is a Swedish retired professional ice hockey player and footballer. Rydberg was part of the Djurgården Swedish champions' team of 1958, 1959, 1960, 1961, 1962, and 1963.
