= Lars Pettersson (footballer) =

Swedish footballer

Personal information
- Date of birth: 29 March 1953

Youth career
- Hudiksvalls IF

Senior career*
Years	Team	Apps	(Gls)
1978	Djurgården	11	(0)
1979	Djurgården	10	(0)
- * Club domestic league appearances and goals

Lars Pettersson (born 29 March 1953) is a Swedish retired footballer (goalkeeper). Pettersson made 21 Allsvenskan appearances for Djurgården in 1978 and 1979.
