= Per Jensen =

Danish footballer (1930–2009)

Personal information
- Full name: Per Allex Jensen
- Date of birth: 10 December 1930
- Place of birth: Copenhagen, Denmark
- Date of death: 14 December 2009 (aged 79)
- Position: Striker

Senior career*
Years	Team	Apps	(Gls)
1947–1953	Kjøbenhavns Boldklub		
1953–1954	Saint-Etienne		
1954–1955	Triestina	14	(3)
1956–1959	Kjøbenhavns Boldklub		

International career
1952	Denmark	2	(2)
- * Club domestic league appearances and goals

Per Alex Jensen (10 December 1930 – 14 December 2009), known as Per Jensen, was a Danish football (soccer) player. He started his career as an amateur player with Kjøbenhavns Boldklub (KB) and was the top goalscorer of the 1959 Danish football championship. He moved abroad to play professionally for AS Saint-Etienne in France and Italian club US Triestina, before ending his career back with KB. He played two games and scored two goals for the Denmark national football team in 1952. Jensen died on 14 December 2009, at the age of 79.
