= Kurt Hansen (footballer, born 1928) =

Danish footballer (1928–2018)

Personal information
- Full name: Kurt Egon Hansen
- Date of birth: 1 February 1928
- Date of death: 21 February 2018 (aged 90)
- Position: Left-back

Senior career*
Years	Team	Apps	(Gls)
1946–1956	Boldklubben Frem		

International career
1953–1954	Denmark	3	(0)
- * Club domestic league appearances and goals

Kurt Egon Hansen (1 February 1928 – 21 February 2018) was a Danish footballer who played as a left-back. He made three appearances for the Denmark national team from 1953 to 1954.
