= Reijo Jalava =

Finnish footballer (1932-2001)

Personal information
- Date of birth: 18 February 1932
- Date of death: 25 January 2001 (aged 68)

International career
Years	Team	Apps	(Gls)
1956–1961	Finland	18	(0)

Reijo Jalava (18 February 1932 – 25 January 2001) was a Finnish footballer. He played in 18 matches for the Finland national football team from 1956 to 1961.

Later he worked as a kit manager of HJK Helsinki, the club he represented as a player.

== Honours ==
HJK

- SM-sarja: 1964
- Finnish Cup: 1966
