= Lars Broström =

Swedish footballer (1931–2013)

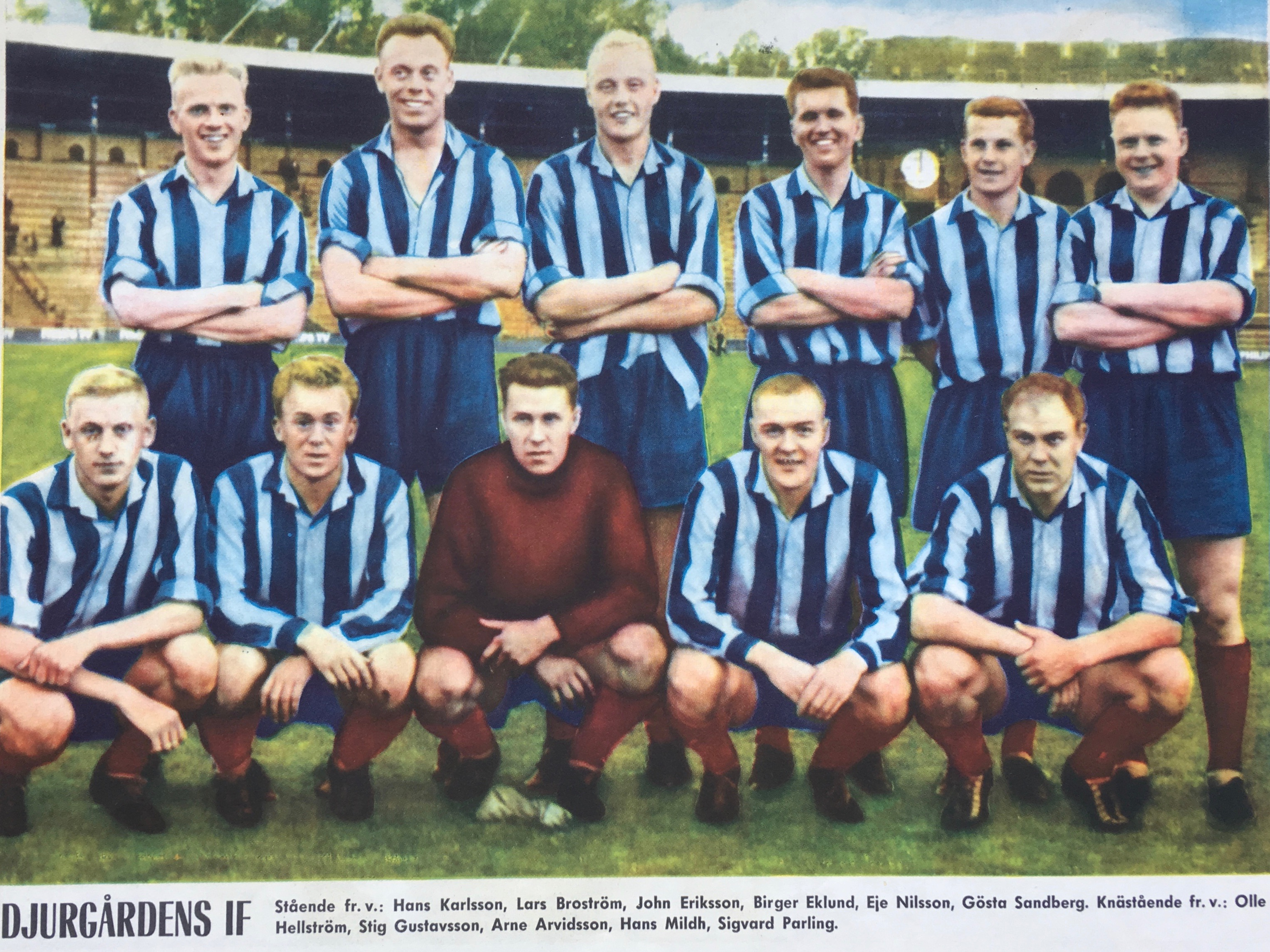
- Djurgårdens IF in 1960; Broström standing, second player from the left.

Personal information
- Date of birth: 26 July 1931
- Date of death: 4 August 2013 (aged 82)
- Position: Defender

Senior career*
Years	Team	Apps	(Gls)
–1956	Värtans IK		
1956–1963	Djurgårdens IF	121	(0)
1964–1968	IFK Stockholm		

International career
1957–1962	Sweden B	6	(0)
1958–1963	Sweden	3	(0)
- * Club domestic league appearances and goals

Lars Broström (26 July 1931 — 4 August 2013) was a Swedish footballer. He made 110 Allsvenskan appearances for Djurgårdens IF.

Broström also played bandy for Djurgårdens IF.

== Honours ==
=== Club ===
Djurgårdens IF

- Division 2 Svealand (1): 1961
- Allsvenskan: 1959
