= Paavo Lyytikäinen =

Finnish footballer (1930-2015)

Personal information
- Date of birth: 14 April 1930
- Date of death: 11 July 2015 (aged 85)
- Position: Inside forward

Senior career*
Years	Team	Apps	(Gls)
1954-1957	Helsingin Jalkapalloklubi	53	(8)
1958-1965	Kronohagens IF		

International career
1961	Finland	1	(0)
- * Club domestic league appearances and goals

Paavo Lyytikäinen (14 April 1930 – 11 July 2015) was a Finnish footballer. He played in one match for the Finland national football team in 1961. He started his career at HJK. In 1958 he switched to KIF where he played until 1965 apart from 1963 season. He played a total of 8 seasons in the highest level of Finnish football. For HJK he played 53 games and scored 8 times while for KIF he played 71 games and scored 20 goals, in addition he scored 22 goals in 3 seasons in the second tier for KIF.
