= Jan Aronsson =

Swedish footballer (1931–2016)

Personal information
- Date of birth: 28 November 1931
- Place of birth: Karlskoga, Sweden
- Date of death: 4 January 2016 (aged 84)
- Place of death: Emmaboda, Sweden
- Position: Forward

Senior career*
Years	Team	Apps	(Gls)
–1956	Degerfors IF		
1956–1958	Lanerossi Vicenza	63	(16)
1959	Djurgårdens IF	9	(2)
1960–1965	Degerfors IF		
1966–1967	Mariestads BK		
1968–1969	Östby IF		
1969–1970	Emmaboda IS		

International career
	Sweden U23	2	(0)
	Sweden B	2	(0)
1953–1954	Sweden	2	(0)
- * Club domestic league appearances and goals

Jan Aronsson (28 November 1931 – 4 January 2016) was a Swedish footballer who played as a forward. He made two appearances for Sweden, 220 Allsvenskan appearances for Degerfors IF and nine Allsvenskan appearances for Djurgårdens IF.
