= Birger Eklund =

Swedish footballer (1929–2015)

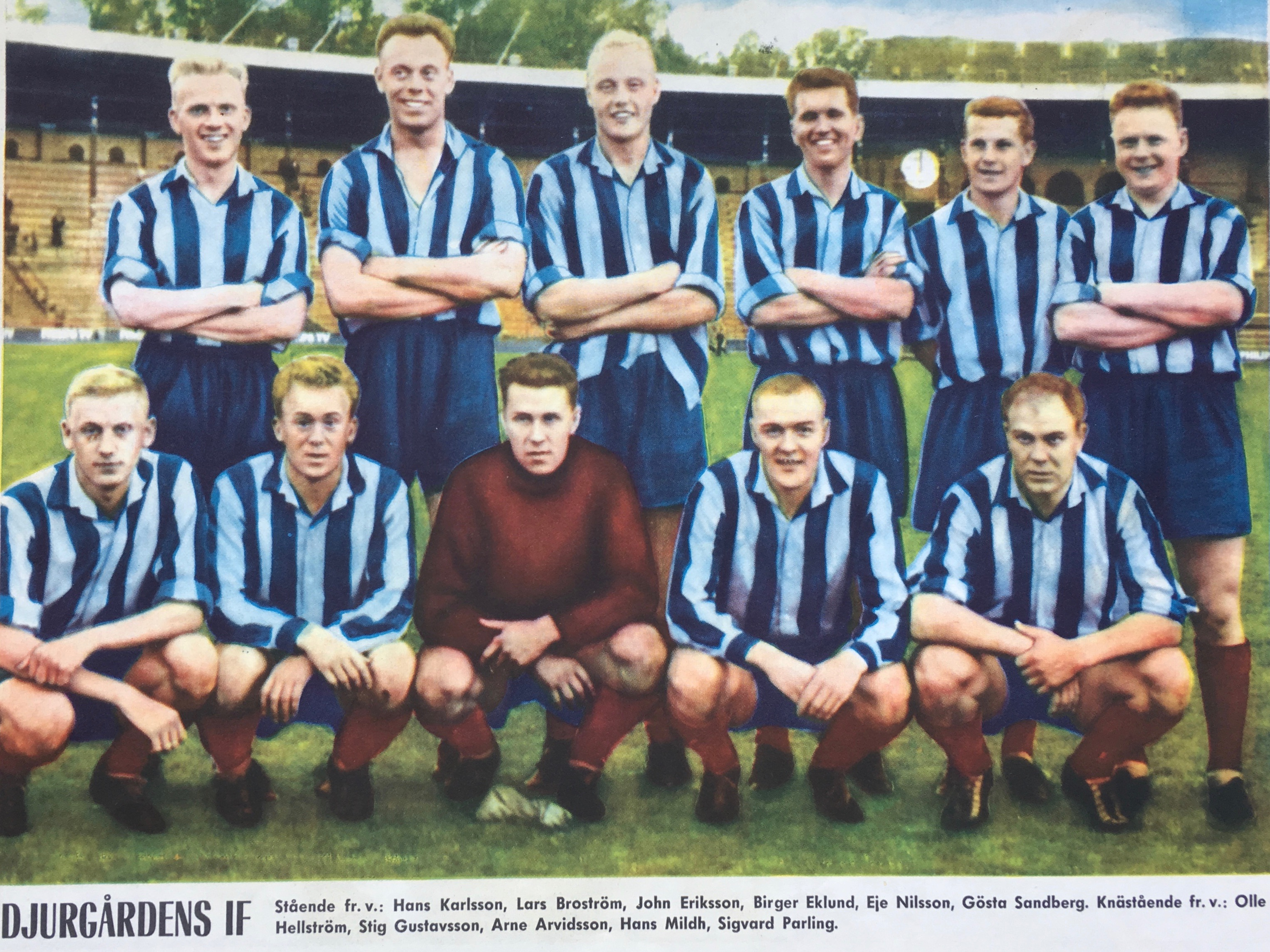
- Djurgårdens IF in 1960; Birger Eklund, standing player, third from the right.

Personal information
- Date of birth: 22 October 1929
- Date of death: 6 December 2015 (aged 86)
- Position: Striker

Senior career*
Years	Team	Apps	(Gls)
- Djurgårdens IF

International career
1954	Sweden	2	(3)
- * Club domestic league appearances and goals

Birger Eklund (22 October 1929 – 6 December 2015) was a Swedish footballer. He made 128 Allsvenskan appearances for Djurgårdens IF and scored 38 goals.

== Honours ==
=== Club ===
Djurgårdens IF

- Allsvenskan (2): 1954–55, 1959
