= Bertil Nilsson =

Swedish footballer

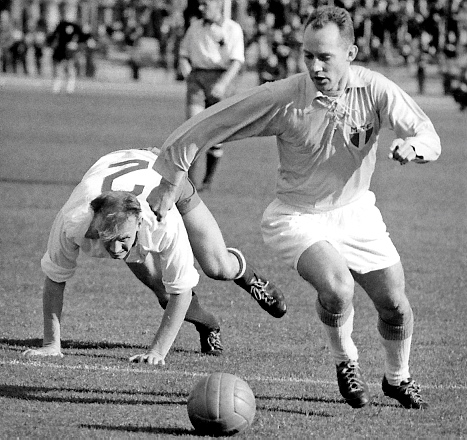

Personal information
- Date of birth: 16 January 1936 (age 90)
- Place of birth: Sweden
- Position: Midfielder

Senior career*
| Years | Team | Apps | (Gls) |
| 1953–1960 | Malmö FF | | |
- Gislaveds IS
- IS Halmia
| 1964–1966 | Malmö FF | | |
- Landskrona BoIS
- Lunds BK

International career
| | Sweden | 6 | (?) |
- * Club domestic league appearances and goals

Bertil "Klumpen" Nilsson (born 16 January 1936) is a Swedish former footballer.

== Career ==
Nillson started his career at Malmö FF and made his Allsvenskan debut at seventeen years of age. In the middle of his career he moved to Gislaved because of his work and took up playing with local team Gislaveds IS. He was later convinced to move to Halmstad to play for IS Halmia which he did until 1964 when he returned to Malmö FF. Nilsson won the league with Malmö in 1965 before he finished his career playing for Landskrona BoIS and later Lunds BK. During his career he also played six times for Sweden, he earned the first cap at nineteen years of age.

== Personal life ==
Bertil Nilsson is the son of former Malmö FF player and manager Sven Nilsson. His father was the manager of the club when they won their first league title in 1944. His father also earned a cap for Sweden.

== Honours ==
=== Club ===
Malmö FF

- Allsvenskan: 1965
