= Henry Thillberg =

Swedish footballer (1930–2022)

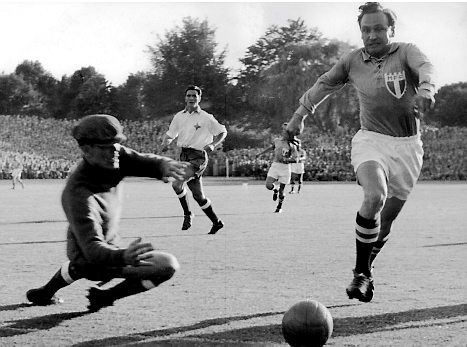
- Thillberg (right) and IFK Norrköping's Bengt Nyholm in 1955

Personal information
- Date of birth: 17 August 1930
- Place of birth: Sweden
- Date of death: 6 February 2022 (aged 91)
- Position: Midfielder

Senior career*
Years	Team	Apps	(Gls)
1951–1962	Malmö FF	177	(42)

International career
1953–1959	Sweden	22	(8)
- * Club domestic league appearances and goals

Henry Thillberg (17 August 1930 – 6 February 2022) was a Swedish footballer who played his entire career at Malmö FF as a midfielder. In 1961, he gave up soccer. He died from heart failure on 6 February 2022, at the age of 91.
