= United States men's national soccer team results (1950–1969) =

This is a compilation of every international soccer game played by the United States men's national soccer team from 1950 through 1969. It includes the team's record for that year, each game and the date played. It also lists the U.S. goal scorers.

The format is: home team listed first, U.S. listed first at home or neutral site.

Records are in win–loss–tie format. Games decided in penalty kicks are counted as ties, as per the FIFA standard.

== 1950 ==
Wins	Losses	Draws
1	2	0

Win Draw Loss

June 25 World Cup GS	United States	1–3	Spain	Curitiba, Brazil
		Report	Igoa 81'; Basora 83'; Zarra 89'	Attendance: 9,511

June 29 World Cup GS	United States	1–0	England	Belo Horizonte, Brazil
	Gaetjens 38'	Report		Stadium: Estádio Independência; Attendance: 10,151

July 2 World Cup GS	United States	2–5	Chile	Recife, Brazil
	Wallace 47'; Maca 68' (pen.)	Report	Robledo 16'; Riera 32'; Cremaschi 54', 82'; Prieto 60'	Stadium: Estádio Ilha do Retiro; Attendance: 8,501

== 1951 ==
Wins	Losses	Draws
0	0	0

== 1952 ==
Wins	Losses	Draws
0	1	0

Win Draw Loss

April 30 Friendly	Scotland	6–0	United States	Glasgow, Scotland
	Reilly 9', 11', 34'; McMillan 29', 89'; O'Connell 60' (o.g.)			Stadium: Hampden Park; Attendance: 107,765; Referee: Douglas Gerrard (Scotland)

== 1953 ==
Wins	Losses	Draws
0	1	0

Win Draw Loss

June 8 Friendly	United States	3–6	England	New York, New York
	Decker 61', 69'; Atheneos 66' (pen.)	Report	Broadis 43'; Lofthouse 48', 62'; Finney 50', 73'; Froggatt 80'	Stadium: Yankee Stadium; Attendance: 7,271

== 1954 ==
Wins	Losses	Draws
2	2	0

Win Draw Loss

January 10 WCQ	Mexico	4–0	United States	Mexico City, Mexico
	Balcázar 5'; Lamadrid 16', 47'; Naranjo 63'			Stadium: Estadio Olímpico de los Deportes; Attendance: 60,000; Referee: Godfrey Sunderland (England)

January 14 WCQ	Mexico	3–1	United States	Mexico City, Mexico
	Torres 60', 89'; Lamadrid 82'		Looby 6'	Stadium: Estadio Olímpico de los Deportes; Attendance: 40,000; Referee: John Best (United States)

April 3 WCQ	Haiti	2–3	United States	Port-au-Prince, Haiti
	Ellie 60' (pen.); Haig 89'		Casey 20'; Chacurian 42'; Looby 83'	Stadium: Stade Sylvio Cator; Referee: Walter Van Rosberg (Netherlands Antilles)

April 4 WCQ	Haiti	0–3	United States	Port-au-Prince, Haiti
			Looby 22', 65'; Mendoza 31'	Stadium: Stade Sylvio Cator; Attendance: 6,000; Referee: Walter Van Rosberg (Netherlands Antilles)

== 1955 ==
Wins	Losses	Draws
0	1	0

Win Draw Loss

August 25 Friendly	Iceland	3–2	United States	Reykjavík, Iceland
	Gudmannson; Thórdarson	Report	Looby	Stadium: Melavöllur; Attendance: 9,500; Referee: Ludvig Jørkov (Denmark)

== 1956 ==
Wins	Losses	Draws
0	0	0

== 1957 ==
Wins	Losses	Draws
0	4	0

Win Draw Loss

April 7 WCQ R1	Mexico	6–0	United States	Mexico City, Mexico
	Gutierrez 14', 26'; Reyes 33', 69', 76'; H. Hernández 63'			Stadium: Estadio Olímpico Universitario; Attendance: 60,000; Referee: Walter Van Rosberg (Netherlands Antilles)

April 28 WCQ R1	United States	2–7	Mexico	Long Beach, California
	Murphy 6', 43'		A. Hernández 22', 36', 82'; Gutiérrez 38'; H. Hernández 65', 87'; Sesma 79'	Stadium: Veterans Memorial Stadium; Attendance: 12,500; Referee: Raymond Morgan (Canada)

June 22 WCQ R1	Canada	5–1	United States	Toronto, Canada
	McLeod 32'; Philley 35'; Hughes 55', 80'; Stewart 57'		Keough 25' (pen.)	Stadium: Varsity Stadium; Attendance: 7,567; Referee: Walter Van Rosberg (Netherlands Antilles)

July 6 WCQ R1	United States	2–3	Canada	St. Louis, Missouri
	Mendoza 42'; Murphy 80'		Philley 9'; Steckiw 14'; Stewart 25'	Stadium: Public School Ground; Attendance: 1,500; Referee: Walter Van Rosberg (Netherlands Antilles)

== 1958 ==
Wins	Losses	Draws
0	0	0

== 1959 ==
Wins	Losses	Draws
0	1	0

Win Draw Loss

May 28 Friendly	United States	1–8	England	Los Angeles, California
	Murphy 18'	Report	Bradley 35'; Flowers 52', 69'; Charlton 64', 82' (pen.), 85'; Kevan 74'; Haynes 87'	Stadium: Wrigley Field; Attendance: 13,000; Referee: Raymond Morgan (Bermuda)

== 1960 ==
Wins	Losses	Draws
0	1	1

Win Draw Loss

November 6 WCQ R1	United States	3–3	Mexico	Los Angeles, California
	Bicek 31'; Fister 58'; Zerhusen 85'		Mercado 7'; Reyes 17', 21'	Stadium: Wrigley Field; Attendance: 8,000; Referee: Dan Kulai (Canada)

November 13 WCQ R1	Mexico	3–0	United States	Mexico City, Mexico
	Mercado 5'; Reyes 35'; Diaz 38'			Stadium: Estadio Olímpico Universitario; Attendance: 80,000; Referee: Gabriel Sanchez (Honduras)

== 1961 ==
Wins	Losses	Draws
0	1	0

Win Draw Loss

February 5 Friendly	Colombia	2–0	United States	Bogotá, Colombia
	Perez; Arias			Stadium: Estadio Nemesio Camacho; Attendance: 30,000

== 1962 ==
Wins	Losses	Draws
0	0	0

== 1963 ==
Wins	Losses	Draws
0	0	0

== 1964 ==
Wins	Losses	Draws
0	1	0

Win Draw Loss

May 27 Friendly	United States	0–10	England	New York, New York
		Report	Hunt 4', 22', 53', 64'; Pickering 6', 47', 74'; Paine 49', 68'; Charlton 67'	Stadium: Downing Stadium; Attendance: 5,062; Referee: Ray Morgan (Canada)

== 1965 ==
Wins	Losses	Draws
1	1	2

Win Draw Loss

March 7 WCQ R1	United States	2–2	Mexico	Los Angeles, California
	Shmotolocha 49'; Bicek 59'		González 34'; Reyes 65' (pen.)	Stadium: Los Angeles Memorial Coliseum; Attendance: 19,337; Referee: Raymond Morgan (Bermuda)

March 12 WCQ R1	Mexico	2–0	United States	Mexico City, Mexico
	Diaz 8'; Navarro 56'			Stadium: Estadio Olímpico Universitario; Attendance: 64,285; Referee: Jose Urtrecho Gutierrez (Nicaragua)

March 17 WCQ R1	Honduras	0–1	United States	San Pedro Sula, Honduras
			Murphy 70'	Stadium: Estadio Francisco Morazán; Attendance: 1,268; Referee: Guillermo Umana (Costa Rica)

March 21 WCQ R1	Honduras	1–1	United States	Tegucigalpa, Honduras
	Taylor 85'		Murphy 80'	Stadium: Estadio Nacional; Attendance: 2,331; Referee: Rodolfo Navarro (Nicaragua)

== 1966 ==
Wins	Losses	Draws
0	0	0

== 1967 ==
Wins	Losses	Draws
0	0	0

== 1968 ==
Wins	Losses	Draws
3	4	1

Win Draw Loss

September 15 Friendly	United States	3–3	Israel	New York, New York
	Roy 50'; Millar 79', 84'		Spiegler 3', 10'; Spiegel	Stadium: Yankee Stadium; Attendance: 10,118; Referee: John Di Salvatore (United States)

September 25 Friendly	United States	0–4	Israel	Philadelphia, Pennsylvania
			Spiegler 71', 79', 83', 89'	Stadium: Temple Stadium; Attendance: 7,161; Referee: James Black (United States)

October 17 WCQ R1	Canada	4–2	United States	Toronto, Canada
	McPate 40', 68'; Pattersen 79'; Vigh 89'		Roy 38'; Stritzl 90'	Stadium: Varsity Stadium; Attendance: 5,959; Referee: Franz Figaroa (Netherlands Antilles)

October 21 Friendly	Haiti	5–2	United States	Port-au-Prince, Haiti
			Stritzl; Millar	Stadium: Stade Sylvio Cator; Attendance: 2,464; Referee: Rolado Lacossade (Haiti)

October 23 Friendly	Haiti	1–0	United States	Port-au-Prince, Haiti
				Stadium: Stade Sylvio Cator; Attendance: 5,641; Referee: Frida Saintelus (Haiti)

October 27 WCQ R1	United States	1–0	Canada	Atlanta, Georgia
	Albrecht 50'			Stadium: Atlanta–Fulton County Stadium; Attendance: 2,727; Referee: Juan Soto (Costa Rica)

November 2 WCQ R1	United States	6–2	Bermuda	Kansas City, Missouri
	Millar 22', 63', 82'; Baker 25', 56'; Cann 60' (o.g.)		Trott 34'; Best 51'	Stadium: Municipal Stadium; Attendance: 2,265; Referee: Feliz Fingal (Netherlands Antilles)

November 10 WCQ R1	Bermuda	0–2	United States	Hamilton, Bermuda
			Smith 8' (o.g.); Roy 41'	Stadium: National Stadium; Attendance: 2,942; Referee: Felipe Burego (Mexico)

== 1969 ==
Wins	Losses	Draws
0	2	0

Win Draw Loss

April 20 WCQ SF	Haiti	2–0	United States	Port-au-Prince, Haiti
	Obas 8'; G. Saint-Vil 54'			Stadium: Stade Sylvio Cator; Attendance: 6,917; Referee: Javier Galindo Segura (Mexico)

May 11 WCQ SF	United States	0–1	Haiti	San Diego, California
			G. Saint-Vil 43'	Stadium: San Diego Stadium; Attendance: 4,274; Referee: Keith Dustan (Bermuda)

== See also ==
- United States at the FIFA World Cup
