= 1954 FIFA World Cup qualification =

1954 FIFA World Cup Qualification
Tournament details
- Dates: 9 May 1953 – 4 April 1954
- Teams: 39 (played at least 1 game) (from 4 confederations)

Tournament statistics
- Matches played: 57
- Goals scored: 208 (3.65 per match)
- Top scorer: (West Germany) Max Morlock (6 goals)

A total of 39 (not counted Iceland, Bolivia, Cuba, Costa Rica, State of Vietnam and India) teams entered the 1954 FIFA World Cup qualification rounds, competing for a total of 16 spots in the final tournament. Switzerland, as the hosts, and Uruguay, as the defending champions, qualified automatically, leaving 14 spots open for competition.

The remaining 37 teams were divided into 13 groups, based on geographical considerations, as follows:

- Groups 1 to 10 – Europe and the Near East: 11 places contested by 27 teams (including Egypt and Israel).
- Groups 11 and 12 – The Americas: 2 places contested by 7 teams.
- Group 13 – Asia: 1 place contested by 3 teams.

Rejected: Iceland, Bolivia, Cuba, Costa Rica, State of Vietnam and India

Withdrawals: Poland, Republic of China, Peru

From the remaining 34 teams, 1 qualified without playing any qualifying match: Hungary

A total of 33 teams played at least one qualifying match. A total of 57 qualifying matches were played, and 208 goals were scored (an average of 3.65 per match).

Listed below are the dates and results of the qualification rounds.

== Groups ==
The 13 groups had different rules, as follows:

- Groups 1, 2, 4, 7, 8, and 10 had 3 teams each. The teams played against each other on a home-and-away basis. The group winners would qualify.
- Groups 5, 6 and 9 had 2 teams each. The teams played against each other on a home-and-away basis. The group winners would qualify.
- Group 3 had 4 teams. The teams played against each other once, either home or away. The group winner and runner-up would qualify.
- Group 11 had 4 teams. The teams played against each other on a home-and-away basis. The group winner would qualify.
- Group 12 had 3 teams. The teams played against each other twice. The group winner would qualify.
- Group 13 had 3 teams. After Republic of China withdrew before the matches began, the remaining 2 teams played each other twice. The group winner would qualify.

=== Group 1 ===
Pos.	Team	Pld	W	D	L	GF	GA	GD	Pts	Qualification
1	West Germany	4	3	1	0	12	3	+9	7	Final Tournament
2	Saar	4	1	1	2	4	8	−4	3	
3	Norway	4	0	2	2	4	9	−5	2	

24 June 1953

Norway	2–3	Saar
Thoresen 3'; Dahlen 15'	Report	Binkert 16'; Otto 30'; Siedl 55'

Bislett Stadion, Oslo, Norway
Attendance: 21,000
Referee: J. Bronkhorst (Netherlands)

19 August 1953

Norway	1–1	West Germany
Hennum 41'	Report	F. Walter 44'

Ullevaal Stadion, Oslo, Norway
Attendance: 32,266
Referee: W. B. Aussum (Netherlands)

11 October 1953

West Germany	3–0	Saar
Morlock 13', 50'; Schade 70'	Report

Neckarstadion, Stuttgart, West Germany
Attendance: 48,000
Referee: Karel van der Meer (Netherlands)

8 November 1953

Saar	0–0	Norway
	Report

Ludwigsparkstadion, Saarbrücken, Saarland
Attendance: 42,000
Referee: Leo Horn (Netherlands)

22 November 1953

West Germany	5–1	Norway
Morlock 27', 63'; O. Walter 69'; F. Walter 80'; Rahn 88'	Report	Nordahl 26'

Volksparkstadion, Hamburg, West Germany
Attendance: 76,000
Referee: Arthur Luty (England)

28 March 1954

Saar	1–3	West Germany
Martin 68' (pen.)	Report	Morlock 36', 48'; Schäfer 84'

Ludwigsparkstadion, Saarbrücken, Saarland
Attendance: 53,000
Referee: J. Bronkhorst (Netherlands)

West Germany qualified.

=== Group 2 ===
Pos.	Team	Pld	W	D	L	GF	GA	GD	Pts	Qualification
1	Belgium	4	3	1	0	11	6	+5	7	Final Tournament
2	Sweden	4	1	1	2	9	8	+1	3	
3	Finland	4	0	2	2	7	13	−6	2	

25 May 1953

Finland	2–4	Belgium
Lehtovirta 49', 75'	Report	Coppens 4', 26', 83'; Anoul 9'

Olympiastadion, Helsinki, Finland
Attendance: 2,377
Referee: Helge (Denmark)

28 May 1953

Sweden	2–3	Belgium
Bengtsson 20'; Selmosson 26'	Report	Anoul 28'; Straetmans 37'; Lemberechts 40'

Råsunda Stadion, Stockholm, Sweden
Attendance: 34,029
Referee: Mowat (Scotland)

5 August 1953

Finland	3–3	Sweden
Lehtovirta 63'; Lahtinen 67'; Rikberg 70'	Report	Sandell 9', 71'; Persson 23'

Olympiastadion, Helsinki, Finland
Attendance: 13,849
Referee: Baalstad (Norway)

16 August 1953

Sweden	4–0	Finland
Sandberg 22'; Sandell 24', 61'; Sandin 56'	Report

Råsunda Stadion, Stockholm, Sweden
Attendance: 27,138
Referee: Asmussen (Denmark)

23 September 1953

Belgium	2–2	Finland
Bollen 25', 75'	Report	Lahtinen 83'; Vaihela 90'

Heysel Stadion, Brussels, Belgium
Attendance: 13,804
Referee: Baumberger (Switzerland)

8 October 1953

Belgium	2–0	Sweden
Coppens 23'; Mees 49'	Report

Heysel Stadion, Brussels, Belgium
Attendance: 31,563
Referee: Schipper (Netherlands)

Belgium qualified. This was the first time Sweden failed to qualify.

=== Group 3 ===
This group was also the 1953–54 British Home Championship.

Pos.	Team	Pld	W	D	L	GF	GA	GD	Pts	Qualification
1	England	3	3	0	0	11	4	+7	6	Final Tournament
2	Scotland	3	1	1	1	8	8	0	3	Final Tournament
3	Northern Ireland	3	1	0	2	4	7	−3	2	
4	Wales	3	0	1	2	5	9	−4	1	

3 October 1953

Northern Ireland	1–3	Scotland
Lockhart 72' (pen.)	Report	Fleming 47', 69'; Henderson 89'

Windsor Park, Belfast, Northern Ireland
Attendance: 58,248
Referee: Arthur Edward Ellis (England)

10 October 1953

Wales	1–4	England
Allchurch 22'	Report	Wilshaw 45', 49'; Lofthouse 52', 53'

Ninian Park, Cardiff, Wales
Attendance: 61,000
Referee: Charles Faultless (Scotland)

4 November 1953

Scotland	3–3	Wales
Brown 19'; Johnstone 42'; Reilly 58'	Report	Charles 49', 88'; Allchurch 73'

Hampden Park, Glasgow, Scotland
Attendance: 71,413
Referee: Thomas Mitchell (Northern Ireland)

11 November 1953

England	3–1	Northern Ireland
Hassall 10', 60'; Lofthouse 75'	Report	McMorran 54'

Goodison Park, Liverpool, England
Attendance: 40,000
Referee: Robert Smith (Wales)

31 March 1954

Wales	1–2	Northern Ireland
Charles 80'	Report	McParland 1', 52'

Racecourse Ground, Wrexham, Wales
Attendance: 32,817
Referee: Charles Faultless (Scotland)

3 April 1954

Scotland	2–4	England
Brown 7'; Ormond 89'	Report	Broadis 13'; Nicholls 50'; Allen 68'; Mullen 83'

Hampden Park, Glasgow, Scotland
Attendance: 134,544
Referee: Thomas Mitchell (Northern Ireland)

England and Scotland qualified.

=== Group 4 ===
Pos.	Team	Pld	W	D	L	GF	GA	GD	Pts	Qualification
1	France	4	4	0	0	20	4	+16	8	Final Tournament
2	Republic of Ireland	4	2	0	2	8	6	+2	4	
3	Luxembourg	4	0	0	4	1	19	−18	0	

20 September 1953

Luxembourg	1–6	France
Kohn 6'	Report	Piantoni 5'; Kopa 10'; Cicci 41'; Glovacki 44'; Kargu 73'; Flamion 88'

Stade Municipal, Luxembourg, Luxembourg
Referee: Dörflinger (Switzerland)

4 October 1953

Republic of Ireland	3–5	France
Ryan 58' (pen.); Walsh 83'; O'Farrell 88'	Report	Glovacki 23'; Penverne 40'; Ujlaki 50', 69'; Flamion 72'

Dalymount Park, Dublin, Ireland
Referee: Franken (Belgium)

28 October 1953

Republic of Ireland	4–0	Luxembourg
Fitzsimons 14', 83'; Ryan 48' (pen.); Eglington 59'	Report

Dalymount Park, Dublin, Ireland
Referee: Bond (England)

25 November 1953

France	1–0	Republic of Ireland
Piantoni 73'	Report

Parc des Princes, Paris, France
Referee: Van Nuffel (Belgium)

17 December 1953

France	8–0	Luxembourg
Desgranges 2', 88'; Vincent 6', 10'; Fontaine 21', 75', 80'; Foix 57'	Report

Parc des Princes, Paris, France
Referee: Roeykens (Belgium)

7 March 1954

Luxembourg	0–1	Republic of Ireland
	Report	Cummins 67'

Stade Municipal, Luxembourg, Luxembourg
Referee: Ausum (Netherlands)

France qualified.

=== Group 5 ===
Pos.	Team	Pld	W	D	L	GF	GA	GD	Pts	Qualification
1	Austria	2	1	1	0	9	1	+8	3	Final Tournament
2	Portugal	2	0	1	1	1	9	−8	1	

27 September 1953

Austria	9–1	Portugal
Ocwirk 13'; Probst 14', 19', 31', 59', 70'; Happel 68' (pen.); Wagner 83'; Dienst 87'	Report	Águas 60'

Praterstadion, Vienna, Austria
Referee: Bauwens (Belgium)

29 November 1953

Portugal	0–0	Austria
	Report

Estádio Nacional, Lisbon, Portugal
Referee: Harzic (France)

Austria qualified.

=== Group 6 ===
Pos.	Team	Pld	W	D	L	GF	GA	GD	Pts	Qualification
1	Spain	2	1	0	1	4	2	+2	2	
1	Turkey	2	1	0	1	2	4	−2	2	Final Tournament

6 January 1954

Spain	4–1	Turkey
Venancio 13'; Gaínza 48'; González 49'; Alsua 65'	Report	Recep 31'

Santiago Bernabéu Stadium, Madrid, Spain
Referee: Vincentini (France)

14 March 1954

Turkey	1–0	Spain
Burhan 16'	Report

Mithat Paşa Stadium, Istanbul, Turkey
Referee: Schmetzer (West Germany)

Spain and Turkey finished level on points, and a play-off on neutral ground was played to decide who would qualify.

17 March 1954

Turkey	2–2 (a.e.t.)	Spain
Burhan 25'; Suat 64'	Report	Artetxe 11'; Escudero 78'

Stadio Olimpico, Rome, Italy
Referee: Bernardi (Italy)

Luigi Franco Gemma, a 14-year-old Italian boy whose father worked at the stadium, picked Turkey's name from the lots with his eyes blindfolded. Therefore, Turkey qualified. This was the first time Spain failed to qualify for the final tournament.

=== Group 7 ===
Since FIFA rejected the entry of Iceland and Poland withdrew, the Group was scratched and Hungary qualified automatically. This was the last time any country qualified for the World Cup automatically since FIFA subsequently introduced regulations to stipulate that no country other than the hosts (and until 2002, the defending champions) could qualify without playing at least one game.

=== Group 8 ===
Pos.	Team	Pld	W	D	L	GF	GA	GD	Pts	Qualification
1	Czechoslovakia	4	3	1	0	5	1	+4	7	Final Tournament
2	Romania	4	2	0	2	5	5	0	4	
3	Bulgaria	4	0	1	3	3	7	−4	1	

14 June 1953

Czechoslovakia	2–0	Romania
Pažický 54'; Vlk 63'	Report

Strahov Stadium, Prague, Czechoslovakia
Attendance: 50,000
Referee: Pósa (Hungary)

28 June 1953

Romania	3–1	Bulgaria
Pecsovszky 20', 30'; Ene 82'	Report	Tashkov 53'

23 August Stadium, Bucharest, Romania
Attendance: 60,000
Referee: Schulz (East Germany)

6 September 1953

Bulgaria	1–2	Czechoslovakia
Bozhkov 55' (pen.)	Report	Vlk 5', 40'

Vasil Levski National Stadium, Sofia, Bulgaria
Attendance: 40,000
Referee: Aleksandrowicz (Poland)

11 October 1953

Bulgaria	1–2	Romania
Kolev 28'	Report	Serfözö 27'; Călinoiu 52'

Vasil Levski National Stadium, Sofia, Bulgaria
Attendance: 40,000
Referee: Dorogi (Hungary)

25 October 1953

Romania	0–1	Czechoslovakia
	Report	Šafránek 38' (pen.)

23 August, Bucharest, Romania
Attendance: 90,000
Referee: Schulz (East Germany)

8 November 1953

Czechoslovakia	0–0	Bulgaria
	Report

Tehelne Pole, Bratislava, Czechoslovakia
Attendance: 30,000
Referee: Chkhatarashvili (Soviet Union)

Czechoslovakia qualified. This was the first time Romania failed to qualify.

=== Group 9 ===
Pos.	Team	Pld	W	D	L	GF	GA	GD	Pts	Qualification
1	Italy	2	2	0	0	7	2	+5	4	Final Tournament
2	Egypt	2	0	0	2	2	7	−5	0	

13 November 1953

Egypt	1–2	Italy
Ad-Diba 33'		Frignani 62'; Muccinelli 79'

Al Ahly Stadium, Cairo, Egypt
Attendance: 22,000
Referee: Steiner (Austria)

24 January 1954

Italy	5–1	Egypt
Pandolfini 1'; Frignani 62'; Boniperti 65', 86'; Ricagni 84'		El-Hamouly 32'

Milan Municipality Stadium, Milan, Italy
Attendance: 40,000
Referee: Horn (Netherlands)

Italy qualified.

=== Group 10 ===
Pos.	Team	Pld	W	D	L	GF	GA	GD	Pts	Qualification
1	Yugoslavia	4	4	0	0	4	0	+4	8	Final Tournament
2	Greece	4	2	0	2	3	2	+1	4	
3	Israel	4	0	0	4	0	5	−5	0	

9 May 1953

Yugoslavia	1–0	Greece
Matošić 71'	Report

Stadion JNA, Belgrade, Yugoslavia
Attendance: 50,000
Referee: Steiner (Austria)

1 November 1953

Greece	1–0	Israel
Bembis 52'	Report

Leoforos Alexandras Stadium, Athens, Greece
Attendance: 22,000
Referee: Massai (Italy)

8 November 1953

Yugoslavia	1–0	Israel
Milutinović 3'	Report

Stadion Gradski Park, Skopje, Yugoslavia
Attendance: 25,000
Referee: Alsteen (Belgium)

8 March 1954

Israel	0–2	Greece
	Report	Kokkinakis 61'; Kamaras 83'

Ramat Gan Stadium, Ramat Gan, Israel
Attendance: 35,000
Referee: Buchmüller (Switzerland)

21 March 1954

Israel	0–1	Yugoslavia
	Report	Zebec 80'

Ramat Gan Stadium, Ramat Gan, Israel
Attendance: 50,000
Referee: Leafe (England)

28 March 1954

Greece	0–1	Yugoslavia
	Report	Veselinović 50'

Leoforos Alexandras Stadium, Athens, Greece
Attendance: 25,000
Referee: Rufli (Switzerland)

Yugoslavia qualified.

=== Group 11 ===
FIFA rejected the entry of Bolivia.

Pos.	Team	Pld	W	D	L	GF	GA	GD	Pts	Qualification
1	Brazil	4	4	0	0	8	1	+7	8	Final Tournament
2	Paraguay	4	2	0	2	8	6	+2	4	
3	Chile	4	0	0	4	1	10	−9	0	
—	Peru	Withdrew								

14 February 1954

Paraguay	4–0	Chile
Lugo 30'; J. Parodi 52'; Hermosilla 70'; S. Parodi 79'

Estadio Libertad, Asunción, Paraguay
Attendance: 15,000
Referee: Erich Steiner (Austria)

21 February 1954

Chile	1–3	Paraguay
Robledo 16'		Lugo 17', 63'; J. Parodi 84'

Estadio Nacional, Santiago, Chile
Attendance: 42,130
Referee: Raymond Vincenti (France)

28 February 1954

Chile	0–2	Brazil
		Baltazar 38', 63'

Estadio Nacional, Santiago, Chile
Attendance: 25,085
Referee: Raymond Vincenti (France)

7 March 1954

Paraguay	0–1	Brazil
		Baltazar 52'

Estadio Libertad, Asunción, Paraguay
Attendance: 15,000
Referee: Erich Steiner (Austria)

14 March 1954

Brazil	1–0	Chile
Baltazar 35'

Maracanã Stadium, Rio de Janeiro, Brazil
Attendance: 112,809
Referee: Erich Steiner (Austria)

21 March 1954

Brazil	4–1	Paraguay
Botelho 60', 85'; Baltazar 62'; Maurinho 90'		Martínez 75'

Maracanã Stadium, Rio de Janeiro, Brazil
Attendance: 112,809
Referee: Raymond Vincenti (France)

Brazil qualified. This was the first time they had to play qualifying matches.

=== Group 12 ===
FIFA rejected the entries of Costa Rica and Cuba. The United States played all their games away from home.

Pos.	Team	Pld	W	D	L	GF	GA	GD	Pts	Qualification
1	Mexico	4	4	0	0	19	1	+18	8	Final Tournament
2	United States	4	2	0	2	7	9	−2	4	
3	Haiti	4	0	0	4	2	18	−16	0	

19 July 1953

Mexico	8–0	Haiti
Balcázar 23', 26', 76'; Gómez 27'; Tellez 34'; Arnauda 38', 69', 85'

Estadio Olímpico de los Deportes, Mexico City, Mexico
Referee: William Crawford (England)

27 December 1953

Haiti	0–4	Mexico
		Ávalos 6'; Lamadrid 15', 59'; Balcázar 65'

Stade Paul-Magloire, Port-au-Prince, Haiti
Attendance: 27,000
Referee: Walter Van Rosberg (Netherlands Antilles)

10 January 1954

Mexico	4–0	United States
Balcázar 5'; Scheppel 16' (o.g.); Lamadrid 47'; Naranjo 63'

Estadio Olímpico de los Deportes, Mexico City, Mexico
Attendance: 60,000
Referee: Godfrey Sunderland (England)

14 January 1954

Mexico	3–1	United States
A. Torres 60', 89'; Lamadrid 82'		Looby 6'

Estadio Olímpico de los Deportes, Mexico City, Mexico
Attendance: 40,000
Referee: John Best (United States)

3 April 1954

Haiti	2–3	United States
Ellie 60' (pen.), 89'		Casey 20'; Chacurian 42'; Looby 83'

Stade Paul-Magloire, Port-au-Prince, Haiti
Referee: Walter Van Rosberg (Netherlands Antilles)

4 April 1954

Haiti	0–3	United States
		Looby 22', 65'; Mendoza 31'

Stade Paul-Magloire, Port-au-Prince, Haiti
Attendance: 6,000
Referee: Walter Van Rosberg (Netherlands Antilles)

Mexico qualified.

=== Group 13 ===
FIFA rejected the entries of India and the State of Vietnam. Both games were played in Japan.

Pos.	Team	Pld	W	D	L	GF	GA	GD	Pts	Qualification
1	South Korea	2	1	1	0	7	3	+4	3	Final Tournament
2	Japan	2	0	1	1	3	7	−4	1	
	Taiwan	Withdrew								

7 March 1954

Japan	1–5	South Korea
Naganuma 16'		Chung Nam-sik 22', 83'; Choi Kwang-suk 34'; Choi Chung-min 68', 87'

Meiji Jingu Gaien Stadium, Tokyo, Japan
Attendance: 8,000
Referee: Haran (Hong Kong)

14 March 1954

South Korea	2–2	Japan
Chung Nam-sik 20'; Choi Chung-min 43'		Iwatani 17', 61'

Meiji Jingu Gaien Stadium, Tokyo, Japan
Attendance: 13,000
Referee: Haran (Hong Kong)

South Korea qualified.

== Qualified teams ==
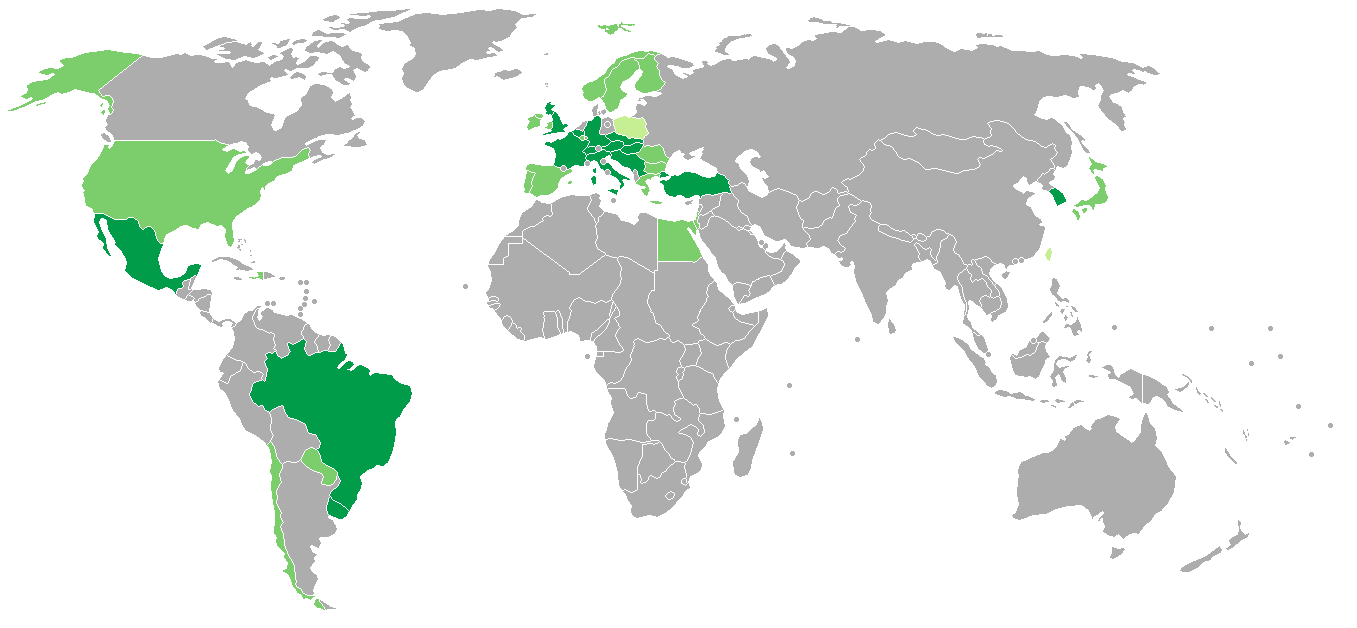
FIFA World Cup qualification 1954

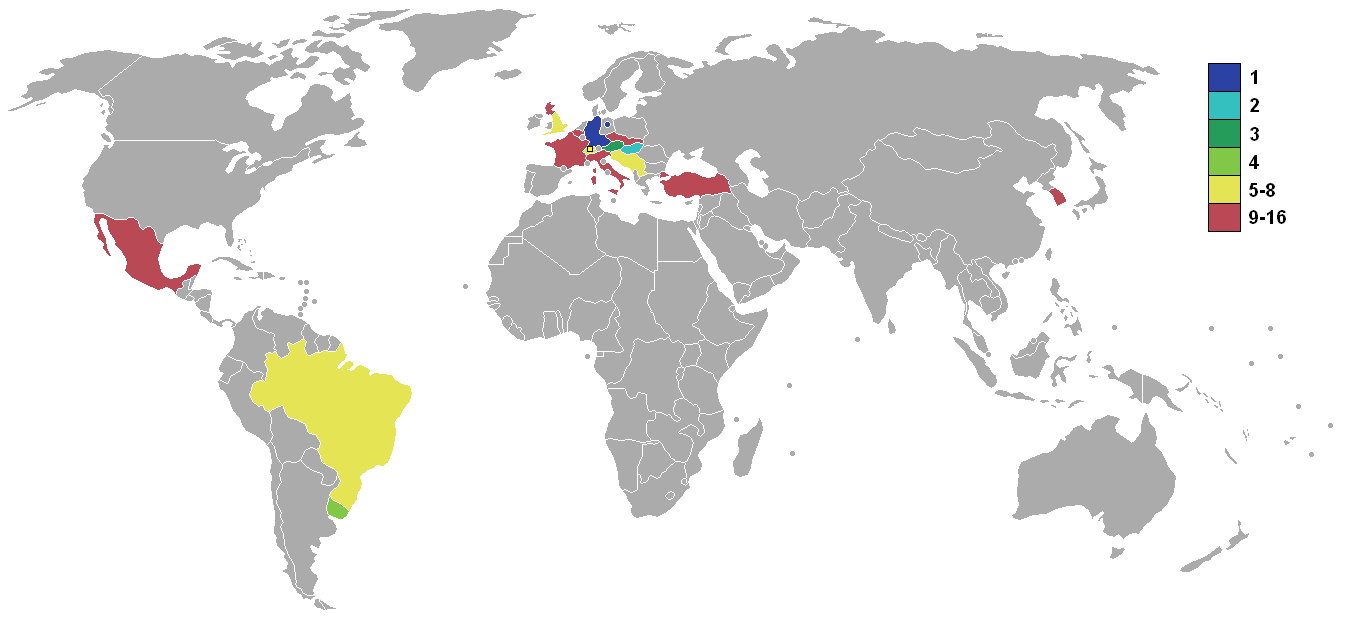
Qualifying countries

Team	Date of qualification	Finals appearance	Streak	Last appearance
Austria	29 November 1953	3rd	1	1938
Belgium	8 October 1953	4th	1	1938
Brazil	21 March 1954	5th	5	1950
Czechoslovakia	25 October 1953	3rd	1	1938
England	11 November 1953	2nd	2	1950
France	25 November 1953	4th	1	1938
Hungary (w)		3rd	1	1938
Italy	24 January 1954	4th	4	1950
South Korea	14 March 1954	1st	1	—
Mexico	14 January 1954	3rd	2	1950
Scotland	31 March 1954	1st	1	—
Switzerland (h)	22 July 1946	4th	4	1950
Turkey	17 March 1954	1st	1	—
Uruguay (c)	16 July 1950	3rd	2	1950
West Germany	28 March 1954	3rd	1	1938
Yugoslavia	28 March 1954	3rd	2	1950

(h) – qualified automatically as hosts

(c) – qualified automatically as defending champions

(w) – qualified automatically because Poland withdrew

== Goalscorers ==
6 goals

- (West Germany) Max Morlock

5 goals

- (Austria) Erich Probst
- (Brazil) Baltazar
- (Mexico) Tomás Balcázar

4 goals

- (Belgium) Henri Coppens
- (Mexico) José Luis Lamadrid
- (Sweden) Nils-Åke Sandell
- (United States) Bill Looby

3 goals

- (Czechoslovakia) František Vlk
- (England) Nat Lofthouse
- (Finland) Kalevi Lehtovirta
- (France) Just Fontaine
- (Mexico) Pedro Arnauda
- (Paraguay) Manuel Lugo
- (South Korea) Choi Chung-min
- (South Korea) Chung Nam-sik
- (Wales) John Charles

2 goals

- (Belgium) Léopold Anoul
- (Belgium) Mathieu Bollen
- (Brazil) Júlio Botelho
- (England) Harold Hassall
- (England) Dennis Wilshaw
- (Finland) Olavi Lahtinen
- (France) Jean Desgranges
- (France) Pierre Flamion
- (France) Léon Glovacki
- (France) Roger Piantoni
- (France) Joseph Ujlaki
- (France) Jean Vincent
- (Haiti) Gerard Ellie
- (Republic of Ireland) Arthur Fitzsimons
- (Republic of Ireland) Reg Ryan
- (Italy) Giampiero Boniperti
- (Italy) Amleto Frignani
- (Japan) Toshio Iwatani
- (Mexico) Alfredo Torres
- (Northern Ireland) Peter McParland
- (Paraguay) José Parodi
- (Romania) József Pecsovszky
- (Scotland) Allan Brown
- (Scotland) Charlie Fleming
- (Turkey) Burhan Sargın
- (Wales) Ivor Allchurch
- (West Germany) Fritz Walter

1 goal

- (Austria) Robert Dienst
- (Austria) Ernst Happel
- (Austria) Ernst Ocwirk
- (Austria) Theodor Wagner
- (Belgium) Victor Lemberechts
- (Belgium) Victor Mees
- (Belgium) Jean-Louis Straetmans
- (Brazil) Maurinho
- (Bulgaria) Stefan Bozhkov
- (Bulgaria) Ivan Kolev
- (Bulgaria) Dobromir Tashkov
- (Chile) Ted Robledo
- (Czechoslovakia) Emil Pažický
- (Czechoslovakia) František Šafránek
- (Egypt) Ad-Diba
- (Egypt) Alaa El-Hamouly
- (England) Ronnie Allen
- (England) Ivor Broadis
- (England) Jimmy Mullen
- (England) Johnny Nicholls
- (Finland) Nils Rikberg
- (Finland) Jorma Vaihela
- (France) Raymond Cicci
- (France) Jacques Foix
- (France) Édouard Kargu
- (France) Raymond Kopa
- (France) Armand Penverne
- (Greece) Thanasis Bembis
- (Greece) Georgios Kamaras
- (Greece) Dimitris Kokkinakis
- (Republic of Ireland) George Cummins
- (Republic of Ireland) Tommy Eglington
- (Republic of Ireland) Frank O'Farrell
- (Republic of Ireland) Davy Walsh
- (Italy) Ermes Muccinelli
- (Italy) Egisto Pandolfini
- (Italy) Eduardo Ricagni
- (Japan) Ken Naganuma
- (Luxembourg) Antoine Kohn
- (Mexico) Rafael Ávalos
- (Mexico) Gregorio Gómez
- (Mexico) José Naranjo
- (Mexico) Nicolás Tellez
- (Northern Ireland) Norman Lockhart
- (Northern Ireland) Eddie McMorran
- (Norway) Knut Dahlen
- (Norway) Harald Hennum
- (Norway) Hans Nordahl
- (Norway) Gunnar Thoresen
- (Paraguay) Ireneo Hermosilla
- (Paraguay) Eulogio Martínez
- (Paraguay) Silvio Parodi
- (Portugal) José Águas
- (Romania) Valeriu Călinoiu
- (Romania) Alexandru Ene
- (Romania) Gavril Serfözö
- (Saar Protectorate) Herbert Binkert
- (Saar Protectorate) Herbert Martin
- (Saar Protectorate) Werner Otto
- (Saar Protectorate) Gerhard Siedl
- (Scotland) Jackie Henderson
- (Scotland) Bobby Johnstone
- (Scotland) Willie Ormond
- (Scotland) Lawrence Reilly
- (South Korea) Choi Kwang-suk
- (Spain) Rafael Alsua
- (Spain) José Artetxe
- (Spain) Adrián Escudero
- (Spain) Agustín Gaínza
- (Spain) Miguel González
- (Spain) Venancio García
- (Sweden) Bengt Berndtsson
- (Sweden) Hans Persson
- (Sweden) Gösta Sandberg
- (Sweden) Herbert Sandin
- (Sweden) Arne Selmosson
- (Turkey) Recep Adanır
- (Turkey) Suat Mamat
- (United States) Cornelius Casey
- (United States) Efrain Chacurian
- (United States) Ruben Mendoza
- (West Germany) Helmut Rahn
- (West Germany) Horst Schade
- (West Germany) Hans Schäfer
- (West Germany) Ottmar Walter
- (Socialist Federal Republic of Yugoslavia) Frane Matošić
- (Socialist Federal Republic of Yugoslavia) Miloš Milutinović
- (Socialist Federal Republic of Yugoslavia) Todor Veselinović
- (Socialist Federal Republic of Yugoslavia) Branko Zebec

1 own goal

- (United States) William Scheppel (playing against Mexico)

== Notes ==
- Turkey qualified via the drawing of lots, after they and Spain finished level on points in Group 6 and a drawn play-off match in Rome.
- For the first time, qualification matches were actually played in South America; in the four previous World Cups, the South American teams qualified automatically through withdrawals (in the case of 1934) or through the South American Football Championship (for the 1938 and 1950 tournaments), while there was no qualifying process in 1930. Argentina did not take part in the qualification process.
- As the French-occupied Saarland protectorate did not become part of Germany until 1957, the Saarland national team entered their only World Cup competition and actually had to play Germany in the qualifiers.
- The entries of Bolivia, Costa Rica, Cuba, Iceland, India, and South Vietnam were rejected by FIFA because they were submitted after the official deadline had passed.
- After being banned from the 1950 tournament following the Second World War, Germany and Japan were both allowed to play again. West Germany qualified and became champions after defeating Hungary with a score of 3–2 in the final that became known as the Miracle of Bern.
