= Japan–South Korea football rivalry =

International football rivalry

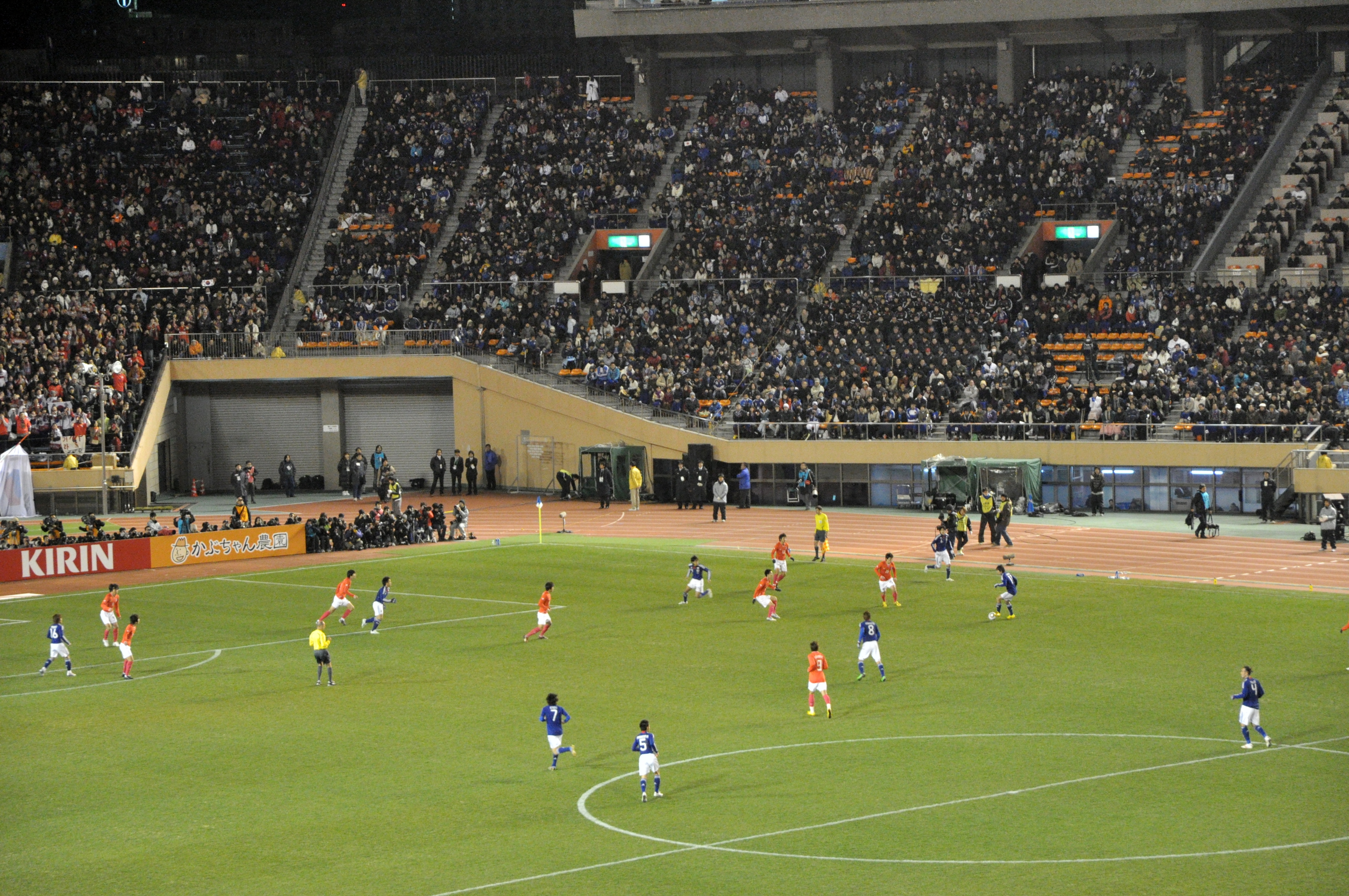
- Japan and South Korea contesting the 2010 East Asian Football Championship
- Location: Asia (AFC); East Asia (EAFF)
- Teams: Japan; South Korea
- First meeting: 7 March 1954; FIFA World Cup qualification Japan 1–5 South Korea
- Latest meeting: 15 July 2025; EAFF E-1 Football Championship; South Korea 0–1 Japan

Statistics
- Total meetings: 82 (Note: AFC Asian Cup and Asian Games (until 1998) matches are generally recognised as international "A" matches by FIFA and Asian nations, but Japan does not recognise some of them including three matches against South Korea (on 1 August 1967, 6 December 1988 and 7 December 1998).)
- Most wins: South Korea (42)
- Top scorer: Kunishige Kamamoto (7)
- All-time series: Japan: 17; Drawn: 23; South Korea: 42
- Largest victory: South Korea 5–1 Japan; 7 March 1954; 1954 FIFA World Cup qualification

The Japan–South Korea football rivalry is a rivalry between the Japan national football team and South Korea national football team, and is one of the Japan–South Korea sports rivalries. The two have played each other officially since 1954. These matches are known as Nikkansen (Japanese: 日韓戦) or Haniljeon (Korean: 한일전) in their respective languages.

== History ==
The historical and regional conflicts between Japan and South Korea, including Japanese occupation of Korea until 1945, have greatly influenced the football rivalry between the two countries. Their first encounter in football was a two-legged qualifier for the 1954 FIFA World Cup. Both matches were held in Japan, with the South Korean government banning the Japan national team from entering their country at the time. South Korea qualified for the 1954 World Cup after defeating Japan 7–3 on aggregate. The two countries also met in the two-legged final of the 1986 FIFA World Cup qualification, and South Korea once again advanced to the World Cup by winning 3–1 on aggregate.

Japan conceded the World Cup berth to South Korea one more time despite a 1–0 derby win in 1994. Japan claimed the top spot before the last match in Asia's round-robin tournament, but was overtaken by Saudi Arabia and South Korea after drawing 2–2 with Iraq in that match. The draw between Japan and Iraq was called the "Agony of Doha" in Japan and the "Miracle of Doha" in South Korea.

The "Japan–South Korea Regular Match" was held 15 times from 1972 to 1991, and South Korea led the event with 10 wins, 2 draws and 3 losses. Its revival was steadily expected by the press, but on the contrary, there were no "A" team matches between the two countries for ten years between 2011 and 2021, apart from the games at the EAFF Championship. Some of the causes were scheduling conflicts and poor diplomatic relations.

South Korea overwhelmingly led the first 50 matches with 32 wins, 11 draws and 7 losses, but the rivalry has become a very close contest since the early 1990s following the establishment of the J.League. From 2021 to 2023, South Korea suffered five consecutive defeats against Japan at all age levels of men's football, all by the same scoreline of 3–0, including the "A" team friendly on 25 March 2021. (Note: The five matches with the same scoreline of 3–0 include the international "A" friendly match in March 2021, the 2022 U-16 International Dream Cup in June 2022, the 2022 AFC U-23 Asian Cup quarter-final in June 2022, the 2022 EAFF E-1 Football Championship in July 2022, and the 2023 AFC U-17 Asian Cup final in July 2023.) In 2023, JoongAng Ilbo surveyed 30 executives in the Korea Football Association, mostly K League club administrators, and 80% agreed that Japan overtook South Korea ten years ago.

== Level of matches ==
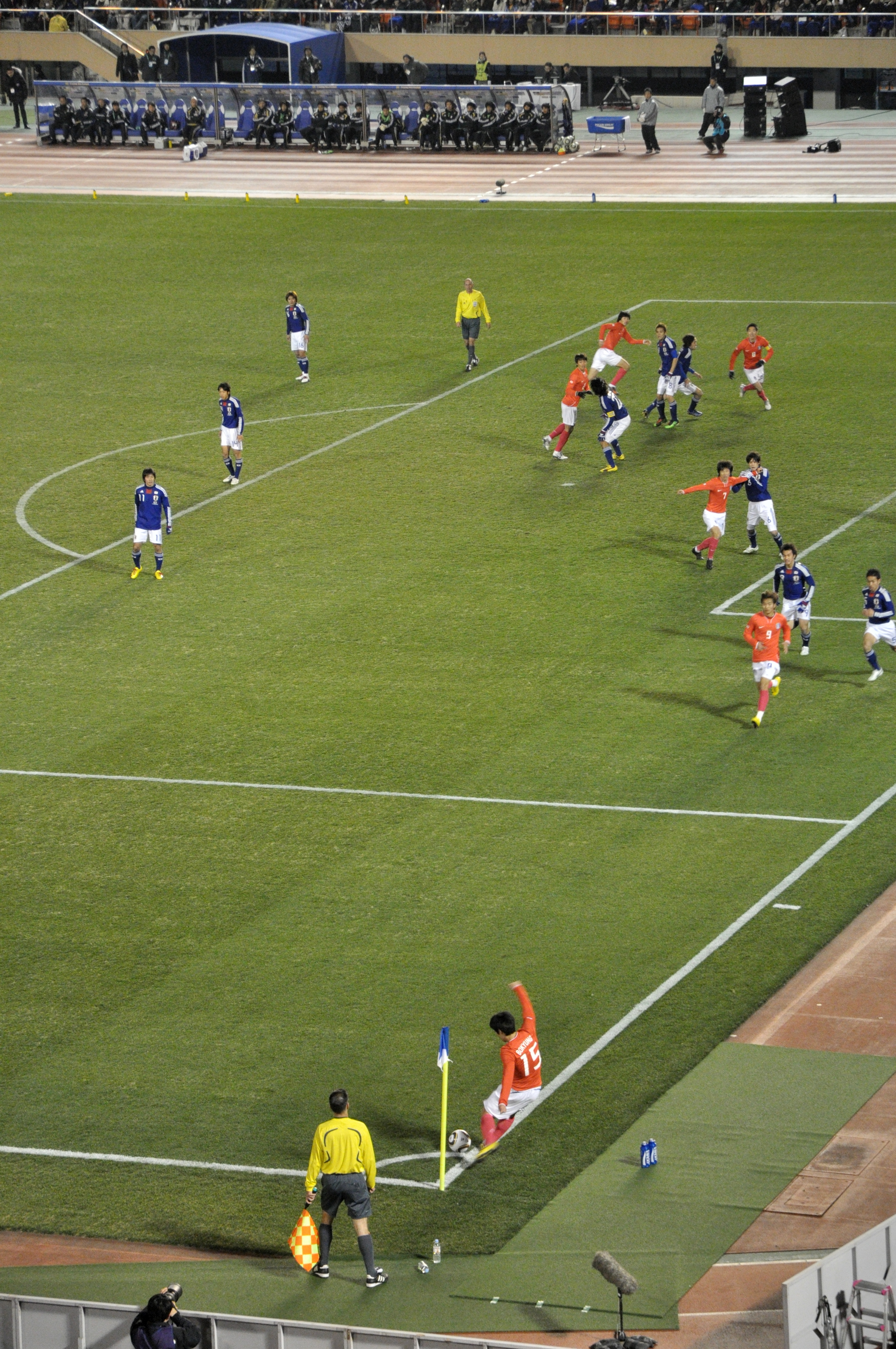
The match between the two teams at the 2010 East Asian Football Championship

The highest level of matches which the two nations could contest are the FIFA World Cup, FIFA World Cup qualification and the AFC Asian Cup. As of 2024, their last meeting at these levels dates back to the 1998 FIFA World Cup qualifiers and the 2011 AFC Asian Cup. They have never met at the FIFA World Cup.

In the EAFF Championships, both countries field mostly players from their domestic leagues rather than their best players based in Europe. The difference in levels between their first-team squad and their domestic league squad depends on the number of players playing in Europe. Japan has had a boom of Europe-based players since the 2010s, hence their domestic league squad is described as the third or fourth national squad.

On the other hand, as of the mid-2020s, South Korea's first team does not consist of many players from Europe, hence their domestic-league squad in EAFF is described as 1.5 or "slightly below 1.5" squad. However, Japanese and Korean fans and media still take much pride in their EAFF rivalry. Japan's coach Vahid Halilhodžić played with his third squad and lost to South Korea 4–1 in Tokyo at the 2017 EAFF E-1 Football Championship, leading to heavy domestic criticism and contributing to him being sacked just before the 2018 FIFA World Cup.

== Men's matches ==
=== Head-to-head record ===
As of 15 July 2025

Venue	Japan wins	South Korea wins	Draws	Japan goals	South Korea goals
At Japan home	8	16	8	38	48
At South Korea home	6	15	3	18	35
Neutral venue	3	11	12	21	41
Total	17	42	23	77	124

=== List ===
No.	Date	Venue	Competition	Home	Score	Away	Goals (home)	Goals (away)	Ref.
1	7 March 1954	Meiji Shrine Stadium, Tokyo	1954 FIFA World Cup qualification	Japan	1–5	South Korea	Ken Naganuma (16)	Chung Nam-sik (22, 83), Choi Kwang-seok (34), Choi Chung-min (68, 87)	
2	14 March 1954	Meiji Shrine Stadium, Tokyo	1954 FIFA World Cup qualification	South Korea	2–2	Japan	Chung Nam-sik (24), Choi Chung-min (43)	Toshio Iwatani (16, 60)	
3 (Note: Olympic qualifiers until 1988 are generally not recognised as international "A" matches by FIFA, but are recognised by Asian nations including Japan and South Korea.)	3 June 1956	Meiji Shrine Stadium, Tokyo	1956 Summer Olympics qualification	Japan	2–0	South Korea	Masao Uchino (54), Isao Iwabuchi (77)		
4	10 June 1956	Meiji Shrine Stadium, Tokyo	1956 Summer Olympics qualification	South Korea	2–0	Japan	Sung Nak-woon (59), Choi Kwang-seok (65)		
5	5 September 1959	Stadium Merdeka, Kuala Lumpur	1959 Merdeka Tournament	Japan	0–0	South Korea			
6	6 September 1959	Stadium Merdeka, Kuala Lumpur	1959 Merdeka Tournament	South Korea	3–1	Japan	Choi Chung-min (2), Cho Yoon-ok (8), Cha Tae-sung (57)	Masao Uchino (12)	
7	13 December 1959	Korakuen Velodrome, Tokyo	1960 Summer Olympics qualification	South Korea	2–0	Japan	Choi Jung-min (51), Moon Jung-sik (57)		
8	20 December 1959	Korakuen Velodrome, Tokyo	1960 Summer Olympics qualification	Japan	1–0	South Korea	Hiroshi Ninomiya (70)		
9	6 November 1960	Hyochang Stadium, Seoul	1962 FIFA World Cup qualification	South Korea	2–1	Japan	Chung Soon-cheon (39, 41)	Koji Sasaki (21)	
10	11 June 1961	Korakuen Velodrome, Tokyo	1962 FIFA World Cup qualification	Japan	0–2	South Korea		Chung Soon-cheon (20), Yoo Pan-soon (71)	
11	30 August 1962	Gelora Bung Karno Stadium, Jakarta	1962 Asian Games	South Korea	1–0	Japan	Cho Yoon-ok (80)		
12	13 August 1963	Stadium Merdeka, Kuala Lumpur	1963 Merdeka Tournament	South Korea	1–1	Japan	Cha Tae-sung (64)	Shozo Tsugitani (65)	
13	1 August 1967	Taipei Municipal Stadium, Taipei	1968 AFC Asian Cup qualification	Japan	2–1	South Korea	Katsuyoshi Kuwahara (40), Hamada Hiroshi (46)	Jung Byung-tak (52)	
14	7 October 1967	National Stadium, Tokyo	1968 Summer Olympics qualification	Japan	3–3	South Korea	Teruki Miyamoto (13), Ryuichi Sugiyama (37), Kunishige Kamamoto (70)	Lee Hoi-taek (54), Huh Yoon-jung (69, 72)	
15	12 October 1969	Dongdaemun Stadium, Seoul	1970 FIFA World Cup qualification	South Korea	2–2	Japan	Kim Ki-bok (8), Park Soo-il (38)	Teruki Miyamoto (33), Yasuyuki Kuwahara (50)	
16	18 October 1969	Dongdaemun Stadium, Seoul	1970 FIFA World Cup qualification	South Korea	2–0	Japan	Jeong Kang-ji (17, 40)		
17	2 August 1970	Stadium Merdeka, Kuala Lumpur	1970 Merdeka Tournament	South Korea	1–1	Japan	Park Lee-chun (89)	Takeo Takahashi (60)	
18	18 December 1970	Supachalasai National Stadium, Bangkok	1970 Asian Games	Japan	1–2	South Korea	Tadahiko Ueda (73)	Jeong Kang-ji (40), Park Lee-chun (114)	
19	2 October 1971	Dongdaemun Stadium, Seoul	1972 Summer Olympics qualification	South Korea	2–1	Japan	Park Soo-duk (47), Chung Kyu-poong (83)	Yoshikazu Nagai (51)	
20	26 July 1972	Stadium Merdeka, Kuala Lumpur	1972 Merdeka Tournament	South Korea	3–0	Japan	Park Soo-duk (27, 64), Park Lee-chun (58)		
21	14 September 1972	National Stadium, Tokyo	Friendly	Japan	2–2	South Korea	Kunishige Kamamoto (18, 89)	Park Lee-chun (48), Lee Cha-man (65)	
22	23 June 1973	Dongdaemun Stadium, Seoul	Friendly	South Korea	2–0	Japan	Lee Cha-man (56), Kim Jae-han (74)		
23	28 September 1974	National Stadium, Tokyo	Friendly	Japan	4–1	South Korea	Kunishige Kamamoto (35, 53), Daishiro Yoshimura (39), Kozo Arai (89)	Kim Jae-han (65)	
24	9 August 1975	Stadium Merdeka, Kuala Lumpur	1975 Merdeka Tournament	South Korea	3–1	Japan	Cha Bum-kun (4, 42, 47)	Hiroshi Ochiai (17)	
25	8 September 1975	Dongdaemun Stadium, Seoul	Friendly	South Korea	3–0	Japan	Cho Dong-hyun (3), Park Sang-in (20), Lee Young-moo (30)		
26	21 March 1976	National Stadium, Tokyo	1976 Summer Olympics qualification	Japan	0–2	South Korea		Lee Young-moo (2), Park Sang-in (71)	
27	27 March 1976	Dongdaemun Stadium, Seoul	1976 Summer Olympics qualification	South Korea	2–2	Japan	Kim Jin-kook (3), Cha Bum-kun (77)	Kunishige Kamamoto (40, 88)	
28	18 August 1976	Stadium Merdeka, Kuala Lumpur	1976 Merdeka Tournament	South Korea	0–0	Japan			
29	4 December 1976	National Stadium, Tokyo	Friendly	Japan	1–2	South Korea	Yoshikazu Nagai (33)	Huh Jung-moo (72), Hwang Jae-man (76)	
30	26 March 1977	National Stadium, Tokyo	1978 FIFA World Cup qualification	Japan	0–0	South Korea			
31	3 April 1977	Dongdaemun Stadium, Seoul	1978 FIFA World Cup qualification	South Korea	1–0	Japan	Cha Bum-kun (83 (pen.))		
32	15 June 1977	Dongdaemun Stadium, Seoul	Friendly	South Korea	2–1	Japan	Kim Jin-kook (21), Kim Sung-nam (25)	Nobutoshi Kaneda (55)	
33	19 July 1978	Stadium Merdeka, Kuala Lumpur	1978 Merdeka Tournament	South Korea	4–0	Japan	Cho Kwang-rae (20), Cha Bum-kun (44), Park Sung-hwa (75), Kim Ho-gon (88)		
34	15 December 1978	Chulalongkorn University Stadium, Bangkok	1978 Asian Games	South Korea	3–1	Japan	Lee Young-moo (8), Park Sung-hwa (28), Oh Seok-jae (68)	Hisashi Kato (87)	
35	4 March 1979	National Stadium, Tokyo	Friendly	Japan	2–1	South Korea	Hiroyuki Usui (21), Kazuyoshi Nakamura (25)	Oh Seok-jae (87)	
36	16 June 1979	Dongdaemun Stadium, Seoul	Friendly	South Korea	4–1	Japan	Park Sung-hwa (15, 25, 54), Shin Hyun-ho (73)	Yoshikazu Nagai (47)	
37	22 March 1980	Stadium Merdeka, Kuala Lumpur	1980 Summer Olympics qualification	South Korea	3–1	Japan	Huh Jung-moo (34 (pen.)), Cho Kwang-rae (57, 79)	Ikuo Takahara (89)	
38	8 March 1981	National Stadium, Tokyo	Friendly	Japan	0–1	South Korea		Chung Hae-won (39)	
39	21 June 1981	Busan Gudeok Stadium, Busan	1981 President's Cup	South Korea	2–0	Japan	Oh Seok-jae (43), Lee Tae-yeop (77)		
40	21 March 1982	Dongdaemun Stadium, Seoul	Friendly	South Korea	3–0	Japan	Kang Shin-woo (2), Choi Soon-ho (38), Lee Kang-jo (52)		
41	25 November 1982	Chhatrasal Stadium, New Delhi	1982 Asian Games	Japan	2–1	South Korea	Kazushi Kimura (58), Nobutoshi Kaneda (79)	Kang Shin-woo (21)	
42	6 March 1983	National Stadium, Tokyo	Friendly	Japan	1–1	South Korea	Koji Tanaka (6)	Kim Kyung-ho (90)	
43	30 September 1984	Seoul Olympic Stadium, Seoul	Friendly	South Korea	1–2	Japan	Lee Kyung-nam (42)	Kazushi Kimura (36), Takashi Mizunuma (50)	
44	2 October 1985	National Stadium, Tokyo	1986 FIFA World Cup qualification	Japan	1–2	South Korea	Kazushi Kimura (43)	Chung Yong-hwan (30), Lee Tae-ho (42)	
45	3 November 1985	Seoul Olympic Stadium, Seoul	1986 FIFA World Cup qualification	South Korea	1–0	Japan	Huh Jung-moo (61)		
46	26 October 1988	National Stadium, Tokyo	Friendly	Japan	0–1	South Korea		Choi Soon-ho (43)	
47	6 December 1988	Qatar SC Stadium, Doha	1988 AFC Asian Cup	South Korea	2–0	Japan	Hwang Sun-hong (13), Kim Joo-sung (35)		
48	5 May 1989	Dongdaemun Stadium, Seoul	Friendly	South Korea	1–0	Japan	Lee Tae-ho (63)		
49	27 July 1990	Workers' Stadium, Beijing	1990 Dynasty Cup	South Korea	2–0	Japan	Hwang Sun-hong (34), Kim Joo-sung (66)		
50	27 July 1991	Nagasaki Athletic Stadium, Nagasaki	Friendly	Japan	0–1	South Korea		Ha Seok-ju (62)	
51	22 August 1992	Workers' Stadium, Beijing	1992 Dynasty Cup	South Korea	0–0	Japan			
52	29 August 1992	Workers' Stadium, Beijing	1992 Dynasty Cup	Japan	2–2 (pen. 4–2)	South Korea	Masashi Nakayama (82), Takuya Takagi (96)	Jung Jae-kwon (32), Kim Jung-hyuk (97)	
53	25 October 1993	Khalifa International Stadium, Doha	1994 FIFA World Cup qualification	Japan	1–0	South Korea	Kazuyoshi Miura (60)		
54	11 October 1994	Hiroshima Stadium, Hiroshima	1994 Asian Games	Japan	2–3	South Korea	Kazuyoshi Miura (30), Masami Ihara (86)	Yoo Sang-chul (51), Hwang Sun-hong (77, 89 (pen.))	
55	21 February 1995	Hong Kong Stadium, Hong Kong	1995 Dynasty Cup	South Korea	1–1	Japan	Lee Woo-young (67)	Hisashi Kurosaki (47)	
56	26 February 1995	Hong Kong Stadium, Hong Kong	1995 Dynasty Cup	Japan	2–2 (pen. 5–3)	South Korea	Masahiro Fukuda (2), Motohiro Yamaguchi (87)	Lee Ki-hyung (26, 90+2)	
57	21 May 1997	National Stadium, Tokyo	Friendly	Japan	1–1	South Korea	Kazuyoshi Miura (88 (pen.))	Yoo Sang-chul (56)	
58	28 September 1997	National Stadium, Tokyo	1998 FIFA World Cup qualification	Japan	1–2	South Korea	Motohiro Yamaguchi (65)	Seo Jung-won (83), Lee Min-sung (86)	
59	1 November 1997	Seoul Olympic Stadium, Seoul	1998 FIFA World Cup qualification	South Korea	0–2	Japan		Hiroshi Nanami (1), Wagner Lopes (37)	
60	1 March 1998	International Stadium, Yokohama	1998 Dynasty Cup	Japan	2–1	South Korea	Masashi Nakayama (17), Shoji Jo (88)	Lee Sang-yoon (21)	
61	1 April 1998	Seoul Olympic Stadium, Seoul	Friendly	South Korea	2–1	Japan	Lee Sang-yoon (40), Hwang Sun-hong (72)	Masashi Nakayama (61)	
62	7 December 1998	Rajamangala Stadium, Bangkok	1998 Asian Games	Japan	0–2	South Korea		Choi Yong-soo (31 (pen.)), 46)	
63	26 April 2000	Seoul Olympic Stadium, Seoul	Friendly	South Korea	1–0	Japan	Ha Seok-ju (78)		
64	20 December 2000	National Stadium, Tokyo	2000 Kirin Challenge Cup	Japan	1–1	South Korea	Toshihiro Hattori (56)	Ahn Jung-hwan (14)	
65	16 April 2003	Seoul World Cup Stadium, Seoul	Friendly	South Korea	0–1	Japan		Yuichiro Nagai (90+2)	
66	31 May 2003	National Stadium, Tokyo	Friendly	Japan	0–1	South Korea		Ahn Jung-hwan (86)	
67	10 December 2003	International Stadium, Yokohama	2003 East Asian Football Championship	Japan	0–0	South Korea			
68	7 August 2005	Daegu World Cup Stadium, Daegu	2005 East Asian Football Championship	South Korea	0–1	Japan		Yuji Nakazawa (86)	
69	28 July 2007	Gelora Sriwijaya Stadium, Palembang	2007 AFC Asian Cup	South Korea	0–0 (pen. 6–5)	Japan			
70	23 February 2008	Olympic Sports Center, Chongqing	2008 East Asian Football Championship	Japan	1–1	South Korea	Koji Yamase (68)	Yeom Ki-hun (14)	
71	14 February 2010	National Stadium, Tokyo	2010 East Asian Football Championship	Japan	1–3	South Korea	Yasuhito Endō (23 (pen.))	Lee Dong-gook (33 (pen.)), Lee Seung-yeoul (39), Kim Jae-sung (70)	
72	24 May 2010	Saitama Stadium 2002, Saitama	2010 Kirin Challenge Cup	Japan	0–2	South Korea		Park Ji-sung (6), Park Chu-young (90+1 (pen.))	
73	12 October 2010	Seoul World Cup Stadium, Seoul	Friendly	South Korea	0–0	Japan			
74	25 January 2011	Al-Gharrafa Stadium, Doha	2011 AFC Asian Cup	Japan	2–2 (pen. 3–0)	South Korea	Ryoichi Maeda (36), Hajime Hosogai (97 (pen.))	Ki Sung-yueng (23 (pen.)), Hwang Jae-won (120)	
75	10 August 2011	Sapporo Dome, Sapporo	2011 Kirin Challenge Cup	Japan	3–0	South Korea	Shinji Kagawa (35, 55), Keisuke Honda (53)		
76	28 July 2013	Seoul Olympic Stadium, Seoul	2013 EAFF East Asian Cup	South Korea	1–2	Japan	Yun Il-lok (33)	Yoichiro Kakitani (24, 90+1)	
77	5 August 2015	Wuhan Sports Center Stadium, Wuhan	2015 EAFF East Asian Cup	Japan	1–1	South Korea	Hotaru Yamaguchi (39)	Jang Hyun-soo (26 (pen.))	
78	16 December 2017	Ajinomoto Stadium, Tokyo	2017 EAFF E-1 Football Championship	Japan	1–4	South Korea	Yu Kobayashi (3 (pen.))	Kim Shin-wook (13, 35), Jung Woo-young (23), Yeom Ki-hun (69)	
79	18 December 2019	Busan Asiad Main Stadium, Busan	2019 EAFF E-1 Football Championship	South Korea	1–0	Japan	Hwang In-beom (28)		
80	25 March 2021	Nissan Stadium, Yokohama	Friendly	Japan	3–0	South Korea	Miki Yamane (16), Daichi Kamada (27), Wataru Endo (83)		
81	27 July 2022	Toyota Stadium, Toyota	2022 EAFF E-1 Football Championship	Japan	3–0	South Korea	Yuki Soma (49), Sho Sasaki (64), Shuto Machino (72)		
82	15 July 2025	Yongin Mireu Stadium, Yongin	2025 EAFF E-1 Football Championship	South Korea	0–1	Japan		Ryo Germain (8)	

== Women's matches ==
=== Head-to-head record ===
As of 29 September 2026

Venue	Japan wins	South Korea wins	Draws
At Japan home	9	0	3
At South Korea home	4	1	6
Neutral venue	8	3	3
Total	21	4	12

=== List ===
No.	Date	Venue	Competition	Home	Score	Away	Goals (home)	Goals (away)	Ref.
1	6 September 1990	Dongdaemun Stadium, Seoul	Friendly	South Korea	1–13	Japan	Kang Gui-nyeo (67)	Etsuko Handa (2, 10), Takako Tezuka (8, 16, 38, 55), Kaori Nagamine (15, 80), Futaba Kioka (21, 67), Michiko Matsuda (32), Akemi Noda (39), Midori Honda (75)	
2	9 September 1990	Dongdaemun Stadium, Seoul	Friendly	South Korea	0–5	Japan		Kyoko Kuroda (21), Takako Tezuka (25, 42), Futaba Kioka (30), Asako Takakura (63)	
3	29 September 1990	Haidian Stadium, Beijing	1990 Asian Games	Japan	8–1	South Korea	Futaba Kioka (22, 34), Kaori Nagamine (40, 46), Etsuko Handa (64), Akemi Noda (73), Kazuko Hironaka (75), Yuriko Mizuma (77)	Han Eun-kyung	
4	4 October 1994	Takegahana Stadium, Fukuyama	1994 Asian Games	Japan	5–0	South Korea			
5	23 September 1995	Kota Kinabalu	1995 AFC Women's Championship	Japan	1–0	South Korea	Akemi Noda (63)		
6	24 October 1998	Seoul Olympic Stadium, Seoul	Friendly	South Korea	1–1	Japan	Cha Sung-mi		
7	26 October 1998	Misari Football Stadium, Hanam	Friendly	South Korea	1–1	Japan	Jin Suk-hee		
8	30 May 1999	Nishikyogoku Athletic Stadium, Kyoto	Friendly	Japan	1–1	South Korea	Tamaki Uchiyama (31)	Tomoe Sakai (24 o.g.)	
9	3 June 1999	National Stadium, Tokyo	Friendly	Japan	3–2	South Korea	Nami Otake (13), Tamaki Uchiyama (73), Yayoi Kobayashi (82)	Cha Sung-mi (15), Kwon Min-joo (20)	
10	3 August 2001	Ulsan Munsu Football Stadium, Ulsan	Toto Cup	South Korea	1–1	Japan	Kang Sun-mi (19)	Yayoi Kobayashi (35)	
11	14 December 2001	Yunlin County Stadium, Dounan	2001 AFC Women's Championship	South Korea	1–2	Japan	Lee Ji-eun (27)	Yayoi Kobayashi (10), Mio Otani (89)	
12	31 August 2002	Wuhan	Friendly	South Korea	0–0	Japan			
13	7 October 2002	Masan Stadium, Masan	2002 Asian Games	South Korea	0–1	Japan		Homare Sawa (15)	
14	21 June 2003	Rajamangala Stadium, Bangkok	2003 AFC Women's Championship	Japan	0–1	South Korea		Hwang In-sun (18)	
15	22 July 2003	Sendai Stadium, Sendai	Friendly	Japan	5–0	South Korea	Mio Otani (5), Tomomi Miyamoto (41), Eriko Arakawa (71, 83), Aya Miyama (79)		
16	6 August 2005	Daegu World Cup Stadium, Daegu	2005 EAFF Women's Football Championship	South Korea	0–0	Japan			
17	10 December 2006	Qatar SC Stadium, Doha	2006 Asian Games	Japan	3–1	South Korea	Azusa Iwashimizu (47), Miyuki Yanagita (72), Yūki Nagasato (82)	Park Hee-young (89)	
18	3 June 2007	National Stadium, Tokyo	2008 Summer Olympics qualifiers	Japan	6–1	South Korea	Tomomi Miyamoto (18), Shinobu Ohno (20), Eriko Arakawa (23), Lee Gye-rim (34 o.g.), Mio Otani (65), Homare Sawa (67)	Jung Hae-in (73)	
19	10 June 2007	Bucheon Stadium, Bucheon	2008 Summer Olympics qualifiers	South Korea	2–2	Japan	Kim Jin-hee (4), Park Hee-young (63)	Shinobu Ohno (10), Aya Miyama (36)	
20	21 February 2008	Yongchuan Stadium, Chongqing	2008 EAFF Women's Football Championship	Japan	2–0	South Korea	Eriko Arakawa (14), Shinobu Ohno (56)		
21	29 May 2008	Thống Nhất Stadium, Ho Chi Minh	2008 AFC Women's Asian Cup	Japan	1–3	South Korea	Yuki Nagasato (10)	Cha Yun-hee (18), Park Hee-young (31, 54)	
22	13 February 2010	Ajinomoto Stadium, Tokyo	2010 EAFF Women's Football Championship	Japan	2–1	South Korea	Shinobu Ohno (7), Mami Yamaguchi (17)	Yoo Young-a (75)	
23	18 June 2011	Ningineer Stadium, Matsuyama	Friendly	Japan	1–1	South Korea	Aya Miyama (70)	Ji So-yun (75)	
24	3 September 2011	Jinan Olympic Sports Center, Jinan	2012 Summer Olympics qualifiers	South Korea	1–2	Japan	Ji So-yun (30)	Mizuho Sakaguchi (10), Shinobu Ohno (45+1)	
25	27 July 2013	Seoul Olympic Stadium, Seoul	2013 EAFF Women's East Asian Cup	South Korea	2–1	Japan	Ji So-yun (13, 66)	Yūki Nagasato (72)	
26	4 August 2015	Wuhan Sports Center Stadium, Wuhan	2015 EAFF Women's East Asian Cup	Japan	1–2	South Korea	Emi Nakajima (30)	Cho So-hyun (54), Jeon Ga-eul (90+3)	
27	2 March 2016	Kincho Stadium, Osaka	2016 Summer Olympics qualifiers	Japan	1–1	South Korea	Mana Iwabuchi (84)	Jung Seol-bin (87)	
28	8 December 2017	Fukuda Denshi Arena, Chiba	2017 EAFF E-1 Football Championship	Japan	3–2	South Korea	Mina Tanaka (8), Emi Nakajima (71), Mana Iwabuchi (83)	Cho So-hyun (14 (pen.)), Han Chae-rin (80)	
29	10 April 2018	Amman International Stadium, Amman	2018 AFC Women's Asian Cup	South Korea	0–0	Japan			
30	28 August 2018	Gelora Sriwijaya Stadium, Palembang	2018 Asian Games	South Korea	1–2	Japan	Lee Min-a (68)	Yuika Sugasawa (5), Lim Seon-joo (86 o.g.)	
31	17 December 2019	Busan Gudeok Stadium, Busan	2019 EAFF E-1 Football Championship	South Korea	0–1	Japan		Yuka Momiki (88 (pen.))	
32	27 January 2022	Shree Shiv Chhatrapati Sports Complex, Pune	2022 AFC Women's Asian Cup	Japan	1–1	South Korea	Riko Ueki (1)	Seo Ji-youn (85)	
33	19 July 2022	Kashima Soccer Stadium, Kashima	2022 EAFF E-1 Football Championship	Japan	2–1	South Korea	Hinata Miyazawa (33), Fuka Nagano (65)	Ji So-yun (59)	
34	26 October 2024	Japan National Stadium, Tokyo	Friendly	Japan	4–0	South Korea	Hikaru Kitagawa (32), Aoba Fujino (34), Mina Tanaka (37), Momoko Tanikawa (56)		
35	13 July 2025	Hwaseong Sports Complex, Hwaseong	2025 EAFF E-1 Football Championship	South Korea	1–1	Japan	Jeong Da-bin (86)	Yui Narumiya (37)	
36	18 March 2026	Stadium Australia, Sydney	2026 AFC Women's Asian Cup	South Korea	1–4	Japan	Kang Chae-rim (78)	Riko Ueki (15), Maika Hamano (25), Saki Kumagai (75), Remina Chiba (81)	
37	29 September 2026	Shizuoka Stadium, Fukuroi	2026 Asian Games	Japan	2–0	South Korea	Chiina Kamiya (54, 63)		

== See also ==
- Japan–South Korea baseball rivalry
