= Paul Danilo =

American soccer player

Paul "Doots" Danilo
Personal information
- Full name: Paul Danilo
- Date of birth: July 5, 1919
- Place of birth: South Fayette Township, Pennsylvania, United States
- Date of death: September 2, 2013 (aged 94)
- Place of death: Bridgeville, Pennsylvania, United States
- Height: 5 ft 7 in (1.70 m)
- Position: Outside right

Youth career
- Christian Brothers College

Senior career*
Years	Team	Apps	(Gls)
1937	Morgan		
1937–1938	Heidelberg		
1939–1946	Morgan		
1946–1947	Pittsburgh Indians		
1947–1952	Morgan		

Managerial career
- 1953–1957: Morgan
- * Club domestic league appearances and goals

Paul “Doots” Danilo (July 5, 1919 – September 2, 2013) was an American soccer outside right who played most of his career with amateur teams in western Pennsylvania. He scored the winning goal in the 1940 National Amateur Cup and later served as a coach and administrator on both the local and national levels. Danilo is a member of the National Soccer Hall of Fame.

== Player ==
In 1937, Danilo joined the Morgan Soccer Club which competed in the Keystone League. At the time, western Pennsylvania was one of the dominant regions in U.S. soccer. Danilo jumped to Heidelberg later in 1937 for a single season before returning to Morgan in 1939. In 1940, he scored the winning goal as Morgan won the National Amateur Cup final. In 1946, he signed with the Pittsburgh Indians of the North American Soccer Football League, winning the 1947 league title. He returned to Morgan the next season and retired from playing in 1952.

== Coach and administrator ==
Danilo became the head coach for Morgan in 1953, a position he held for four seasons. He also served as secretary and then president of the West Penn Soccer Association and was the Commissioner of both the National Challenge Cup and National Amateur Cup.

Danilo was inducted into the National Soccer Hall of Fame in 1997. He is the son in-law of Daniel Zampini, also a member of the National Soccer Hall of Fame.
