= Antonín Šolc =

Czech footballer

Personal information
- Full name: Antonín Šolc
- Date of birth: 16 June 1928
- Date of death: 5 January 1996 (aged 67)
- Position: Forward

Youth career
- Satalice

Senior career*
Years	Team	Apps	(Gls)
1951	ATK Praha		
1955	Jiskra Liberec		
1956–1963	Baník Kladno		
- * Club domestic league appearances and goals

Antonín Šolc (16 June 1928 – 5 January 1996) was a Czech footballer who played as a forward. He played his club football in Czechoslovakia for Dukla Prague, Jiskra Liberec and Baník Kladno.
