= 1954 FIFA World Cup qualification Group 13 =

Football tournament qualification stage

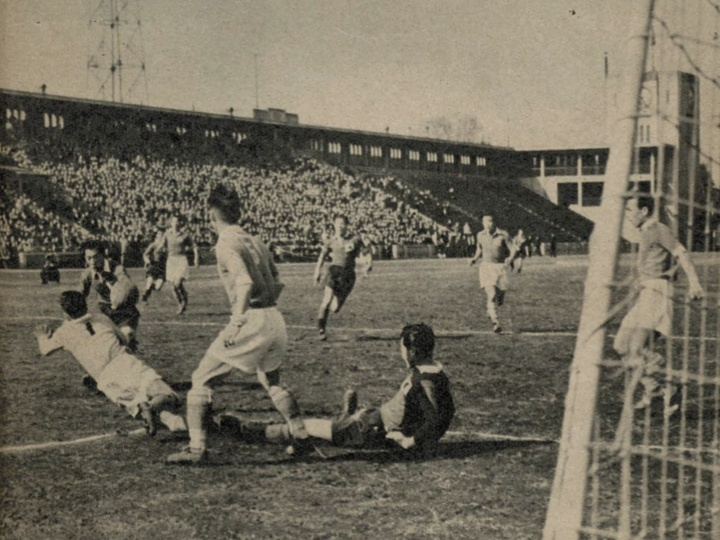
1954 FIFA World Cup Asian Qualifiers: Japan vs. South Korea

The Group 13 qualifiers for the 1954 FIFA World Cup were contested by teams from Asia. Following the rejection of entries from India and Vietnam, the group was organized into a three-team round-robin tournament between Japan, the Republic of China, and South Korea. The Republic of China later withdrew, leaving Japan and South Korea to play a pair of matches.

Both matches were played at Meiji Jingu Gaien Stadium due to a refusal by South Korean president Rhee Syng-man to allow the entry of Japanese players. The tournament was played less than a decade after the end of World War II, which ended the occupation of Korea under Japanese rule. South Korea won the first leg 5–1 and drew 2–2 in the second leg to earn qualification to their first FIFA World Cup. It was the last qualification tournament not organized by the Asian Football Confederation (AFC), which was established in May 1954.

== Table and fixtures ==
Final table										Results			Home							Away						
Rank	Team	Pld	W	D	L	GF	GA	GD	Pts	(South Korea)	(Japan)	(Taiwan)	Pld	W	D	L	GF	GA	Pts	Pld	W	D	L	GF	GA	Pts
1	South Korea	2	1	1	0	7	3	+4	3	X	5–1	–	0	0	0	0	0	0	0	2	1	1	0	7	3	3
2	Japan	2	0	1	1	3	7	–4	1	2–2	X	–	2	0	1	1	3	7	1	0	0	0	0	0	0	0
–	Taiwan	–	–	–	–	–	–	–	–	–	–	X	–	–	–	–	–	–	–	–	–	–	–	–	–	–

7 March 1954

Japan	1–5	South Korea
Ken Naganuma 16'		Chung Nam-sik 22', 83'; Choi Kwang Suk 34'; Choi Chung-min 68', 87'

Meiji Jingu Gaien Stadium, Tokyo, Japan
Referee: Haran (Hong Kong)

14 March 1954

South Korea	2–2	Japan
Chung Nam-sik 24'; Choi Chung-min 43'		Toshio Iwatani 17', 61'

Meiji Jingu Gaien Stadium, Tokyo, Japan
Referee: Haran (Hong Kong)
