= Gil Heron =

Jamaican footballer (1922–2008)

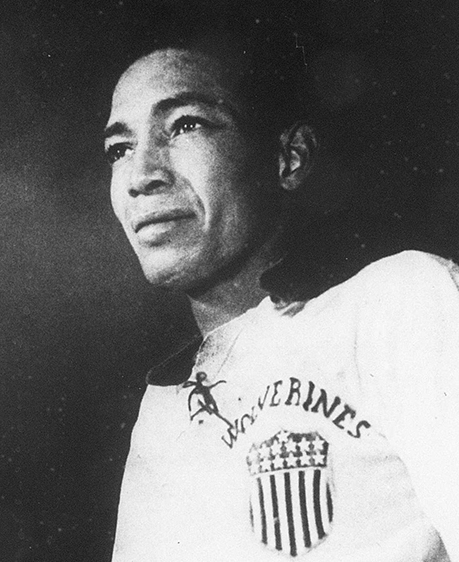
- Heron in Ebony magazine, 1947

Personal information
- Full name: Gilbert Saint Elmo Heron
- Date of birth: 9 April 1922
- Place of birth: Kingston, Jamaica
- Date of death: 27 November 2008 (aged 86)
- Place of death: Detroit, Michigan, United States
- Position: Centre forward

Senior career*
Years	Team	Apps	(Gls)
–	Detroit Venetia	?	(?)
1946	Detroit Wolverines	?	(?)
1947	Chicago Maroons	?	(?)
1949	Chicago Sparta	?	(?)
–	Detroit Corinthians	?	(?)
1951–1952	Celtic	5	(2)
1952–1953	Third Lanark	7	(5)
1953–1954	Kidderminster Harriers	?	(10)
–	Detroit Corinthians	?	(?)
–	Windsor Corinthians	?	(?)
Total		?	(?)

International career
- Jamaica
- * Club domestic league appearances and goals

Gilbert Saint Elmo Heron (9 April 1922 – 27 November 2008) was a Jamaican professional footballer. He was the first black player to play for Scottish club Celtic and was the father of poet and musician Gil Scott-Heron.

== Career ==
Born Gilbert Heron in Kingston, Jamaica, to Walter Gilbert Heron and Lucille Gentles, he came from a family of means. He played for St Georges College, a prominent Jamaican high school, and won the Manning Cup and Oliver Shield in 1937 – a statement of island-wide, schoolboy football supremacy. He went on to represent a Caribbean all-star football team and beat Jamaican Olympian Herb McKenley as a schoolboy.

He moved to Canada as a youth and was later enlisted in the Royal Canadian Air Force. As well as being a track athlete and a boxer, he played football and broke through during his stay there. A centre forward, he signed for Detroit Corinthians and the champion Detroit Wolverines, where he was top goalscorer in the 1946 season of the North American Soccer Football League. He then played for the Chicago Maroons in 1947.

After playing for Chicago Sparta in 1949, he played for Windsor Corinthians in 1950 and was twice selected to all-star teams against the touring England national team. After missing the first match with the Ontario All-Stars on May 24 (on account of a league suspension in Detroit), he recorded an assist for the Essex All-Stars in the June 17 match (albeit a 9–2 loss to England). Both Gil and his brother Lee played for the Essex All-Stars.

He was spotted by a scout from Glasgow club Celtic while the club was on tour in North America and he was signed by the Scottish club in 1951 after being invited over for a trial. Becoming the first black player for Celtic, and one of the first to play professionally in Scotland, Heron went on to score on his debut on 18 August 1951 in a League Cup tie against Morton that Celtic won 2–0. Heron only played five first-team matches in all, scoring twice. He was released by the club the next year after making one appearance in the Scottish Football League (having been unable to displace the established John McPhail) and joined Third Lanark, where he played in seven League Cup matches, scoring five goals but did not appear in the League.

Next, he went to English club Kidderminster Harriers, before moving back to North America.

In 1957, he played for Windsor Corinthians and was again selected to Ontario's Essex All-Stars to face a touring English team, Tottenham Hotspur, on 22 May.

== Personal life ==
While in Chicago, Heron met Bobbie Scott, a singer, with whom he had a son in 1949, Gil Scott-Heron, who became a famed poet and musician. They separated when Heron left for Scotland and did not meet again until Scott-Heron was 26. Heron had three more children with his wife Margaret Frize (deceased), whom he met while in Glasgow, Scotland: Gayle, Denis and his youngest child Kenneth, who was killed in Detroit. His older brother, Roy Trevor Gilbert Heron, served with the Norwegian Merchant Navy during World War II and then joined the Canadian army, later moving to Canada, where he became active in black Canadian politics.

At Celtic, he earned the nicknames "The Black Arrow" and "The Black Flash". While living in Glasgow, he played cricket with leading local clubs such as Poloc. He later became a published poet, with one of his works, "The Great Ones", describing leading players from his time playing football in Scotland.

Heron died in Detroit of a heart attack on 27 November 2008, aged 86.
