= Nicholas DiOrio =

American soccer player

Nick DiOrio
Personal information
- Full name: Nicholas DiOrio
- Date of birth: February 4, 1921
- Place of birth: Morgan, Pennsylvania, Allegheny County, United States
- Date of death: September 11, 2003 (aged 82)
- Place of death: Green Tree, Pennsylvania, United States
- Height: 5 ft 7 in (1.70 m)
- Position: Forward

Youth career
- Avella Juniors

Senior career*
Years	Team	Apps	(Gls)
–1946	Morgan Strasser		
1946	Pittsburgh Strasser		
1947	Chicago Vikings		
1947–1949	Morgan Strasser		
1949–?	Harmarville Hurricanes		
- Pittsburgh Beadling
- * Club domestic league appearances and goals

Nicholas DiOrio (February 4, 1921 – September 11, 2003) was an American soccer player who played as a forward. He was a member of the U.S. national team at the 1950 FIFA World Cup. He is a member of the National Soccer Hall of Fame.

== Youth ==
DiOrio grew up in the Pittsburgh, Pennsylvania area and graduated from South Fayette Township High School in 1939. During high school, he was best known as an outstanding basketball player, reputedly scoring fifty points in one game. While he played basketball in school, he was an excellent soccer player for his club team, Avella Juniors. In 1939, his club won the U-19 national championship, known as the McGuire Cup.

== Club career ==
While making a living as a factory worker, DiOrio devoted his spare time to his passion, playing soccer. In 1942, he was on the roster of Morgan Strasser when it lost the National Amateur Cup to Fall River. However, the team took the cup in 1943 with a victory over Santa Maria S.C. In 1944, Morgan Strasser went to a third straight Amateur Cup final, but lost to S.C. Eintracht. In 1946, DiOrio left Morgan Strasser, for the Pittsburgh Strasser of the newly established North American Soccer Football League. In 1947 he moved to the Chicago Vikings. After the collapse of the NAFSL, following the 1947 season, DiOrio signed with the Pittsburgh Indians in September. In 1949, the club won the National Challenge Cup. In 1950, he was with Pittsburgh Harmarville when they lost the National Amateur Cup final to Ponta Delgada S.C. In 1951, DiOrio lost another Amateur Cup final, his fourth. However, Harmarville followed those two losses with a National Challenge Cup championship in 1952. At some point, he left Harmarville and signed with Pittsburgh Beadling, with whom he finished his career in 1959. During his twenty years of playing soccer, DiOrio won the National Amateur Cup, National Challenge Cup, and five Keystone Senior League championships.

== National team ==
While DiOrio was selected to the U.S. roster for the 1950 FIFA World Cup, he never entered a game.

== Soccer management ==
After retiring from playing in 1959, DiOrio continued to coach soccer teams. In 1971, he became the president of the West Penn Soccer Association.

== Non-soccer career ==
While soccer remained at the center of his life, including leading him to his wife whom he met through a team sponsored by her father's beer garden, Jack's Supper Club, he earned a living as a factory worker in Bridgeville, Pennsylvania. He also worked for the county road maintenance department.

DiOrio was inducted, along with the rest of the 1950 U.S. World Cup team, into the National Soccer Hall of Fame in 1976. He is also a member of state and regional halls of fame.

He died of colorectal cancer on 11 September 2003, at the age of 82.
