= Ireneo Hermosilla =

Paraguayan footballer (1928-before 01/04/2003)

Inociencio González
Personal information
- Date of birth: 31 January 1928
- Date of death: before 1 April 2003
- Position: Midfielder

Senior career*
Years	Team	Apps	(Gls)
1952-1953	Club Libertad		
1956	Club Libertad		

International career
1953-1956	Paraguay	20	(1)
Medal record
Representing Paraguay
Copa América
Winner	1953 Peru
- * Club domestic league appearances and goals

Ireneo Hermosilla (31 January 1928 - before 1 April 2003) was a Paraguayan footballer. He was part of Paraguay's squad that won the 1953 South American Championship.

== International career ==
Hermosilla was selected in Paraguay's squad for the 1953 South American Championship. He earned his first cap in the first game of the tournament against Chile on 25 February.

On 14 February 1954, during a 1954 FIFA World Cup qualification game against Chile Hermosilla scored his only goal for Paraguay.

Hermosilla was also part of Paraguay's squad for the 1956 South American Championship during which he played four games.

The friendly game against Brazil on 12 June 1956 was his 20th and last cap with Paraguay.
