= North American Soccer Football League =

Defunct soccer league in the United States and Canada

The North American Soccer Football League, also known as the North American Football League, was a soccer league that operated for two seasons, 1946 and 1947.

Fred Weiszmann was the league founder and first president in 1946 while Leslie O'Connor was the president in 1947 (as elected in December 1946).

Financial problems reduced the league to five teams in September 1947. The Maroons and Vikings of Chicago were replaced with the Chicago Tornadoes. The remaining teams were the St. Louis Raiders, Pittsburgh Indians, Toronto Greenbacks, and Detroit Pioneers. The Tornadoes were a combination of the best players from the old Vikings and Maroons.

== 1946 season ==
The 1946 season featured a 20-match schedule from 7 June to 1 September, with all five teams playing eight matches each. The Detroit Wolverines clinched the title on 24 August after rivals Toronto lost their second-last match of the season. Toronto won their last game of the season over Detroit on 25 August, but still finished one point back in the standings. Detroit and Toronto were then scheduled to meet in a two-match playoff, with Toronto winning the first match on 21 September. Detroit claimed that they did not want to complete the series as they had already won the league's championship.

== 1947 season ==
The 1947 season featured a 30-match schedule from 6 April to 30 August, with all six teams scheduled to play 10 matches each. The champion Detroit Wolverines had dropped out of the league, while both the Detroit Pioneers and St. Louis Raiders were added to the league. The Pittsburgh Indians and Toronto Greenbacks finished tied for first place with 14 points each, thus requiring a two-match playoff to decide a champion. The two matches were played in October (after the Fall Season had started), with Pittsburgh winning both matches to claim the championship.

== 1947 Fall season ==
After league meetings in July, the 1947 Fall season was scheduled to feature seven teams with the return of the Detroit Wolverines. The league decided against adding a team from Cleveland. By the time the season started in September, however, the revised schedule featured just four teams (without the Wolverines, Chicago Maroons, and Chicago Vikings). A fifth team, the new Chicago Tornadoes, was set to replace the two Chicago teams. Despite all the schedule revisions, only three teams were in action from 6 September to 4 October: Pittsburgh Indians, St. Louis Raiders, and Toronto Greenbacks.

== Champions ==
- 1946 season: Detroit Wolverines
- 1947 season: Pittsburgh Indians

== Teams from 1946 to 1947 ==
- Chicago Maroons (1946, 1947)
- Chicago Vikings (1946, 1947)
- Detroit Pioneers (1947)
- Detroit Wolverines (1946)
- Morgan Strassers / Pittsburgh Indians (1946, 1947)
- St. Louis Raiders (1947)
- Toronto Greenbacks (1946, 1947)
- Chicago Tornadoes (Fall 1947)

== Significant players ==
- Dick Arends with Toronto in '46 and '47 and on loan to Chicago Vikings in '46
- Paul Danilo with Pittsburgh in '46 and '47
- Nicholas DiOrio with Pittsburgh in '46 and Chicago in '47
- Gil Heron with Detroit Corinthians in '46 (top league goal scorer) and father of Gil Scott-Heron died 27 November 2008
- Doug McMahon with Chicago in '46
- Les Medley with Toronto in '47
- Harry Phillips with Toronto in '46 and '47 and on loan to Chicago Vikings in '46

== Sources ==
- NASFL
- Obituary: Nicholas DiOrio / Competed in 1950 World Cup
