= 1947 North American Soccer Football League season =

North American Soccer Football League
- Season: 1947
- Dates: 6 April- 30 August 1947
- Champions: Pittsburgh Indians
- Matches: 30
- Goals: 103 (3.43 per match)

The 1947 North American Soccer Football League season featured a 30-match schedule from 6 April to 30 August, with all six teams scheduled to play 10 matches each. The champion Detroit Wolverines had dropped out of the league, while both the Detroit Pioneers and St. Louis Raiders were added to the league. The Pittsburgh Indians and Toronto Greenbacks finished tied for first place with 14 points each, thus requiring a two-match playoff to decide a champion. The two matches were played in October (after the Fall Season had started), with Pittsburgh winning both matches to claim the championship.

== League standings ==
Team	Pld	W	D	L	GF	GA	GAv	Pts
Pittsburgh Indians	10	5	4	1	18	16	1.125	14
Toronto Greenbacks	10	6	2	2	26	18	1.444	14
St. Louis Raiders	10	4	3	3	20	19	1.053	11
Chicago Maroons	10	3	3	4	16	12	1.333	9
Detroit Pioneers	10	2	3	5	13	21	0.619	7
Chicago Vikings	10	2	1	7	10	17	0.588	5

Source: rsssf.com
Rules for classification: 2pts for win, 1pt for draw.

FINAL: Pittsburgh defeated Toronto 3–2, 3–2.

== See also ==
- 1946 North American Soccer Football League season
