= 1955 Czechoslovak First League =

Czechoslovak First League
- Season: 1955
- Dates: 12 March – 27 November
- Champions: Slovan Bratislava
- Relegated: Tankista Prague; Jiskra Liberec
- European Cup: Slovan Bratislava
- Top goalscorer: Emil Pažický (19 goals)

Statistics of Czechoslovak First League in the 1955 season.

== Overview ==
It was contested by 12 teams, and Slovan Bratislava won the championship. Emil Pažický was the league's top scorer with nineteen goals.

== Stadia and locations ==
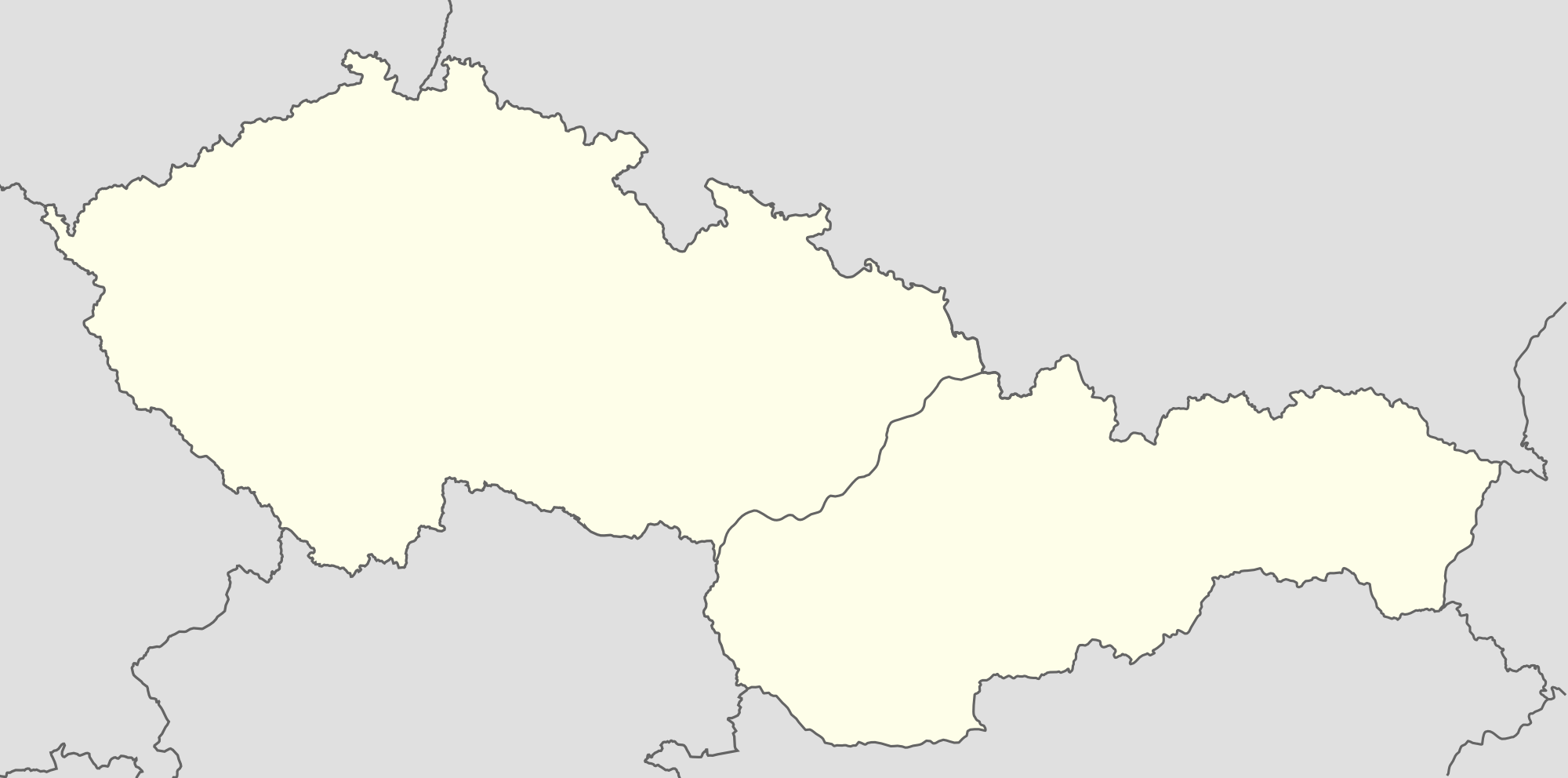
Location of clubs in the 1955 Czechoslovak First League

== League standings ==
Pos	Team	Pld	W	D	L	GF	GA	GR	Pts	Qualification or relegation
1	Slovan Bratislava (C)	22	13	5	4	41	14	2.929	31	Qualification for the European Cup preliminary round
2	ÚDA Prague	22	11	7	4	44	21	2.095	29	
3	Spartak Prague Sokolovo	22	10	7	5	50	29	1.724	27	
4	Tatran Prešov	22	10	5	7	23	25	0.920	25	
5	Dynamo Prague	22	10	4	8	38	42	0.905	24	
6	Baník Kladno	22	10	3	9	38	30	1.267	23	
7	CH Bratislava	22	9	4	9	34	31	1.097	22	
8	Spartak Trnava	22	8	5	9	24	35	0.686	21	
9	Iskra Žilina	22	7	6	9	28	24	1.167	20	
10	Baník Ostrava	22	9	1	12	29	37	0.784	19	
11	Tankista Prague (R)	22	4	8	10	29	45	0.644	16	Relegation to Czechoslovak Second League
12	Jiskra Liberec (R)	22	3	1	18	25	70	0.357	7	Relegation to Czechoslovak Second League

Source: rsssf.com
(C) Champions; (R) Relegated

== Results ==
Home \ Away	KLA	OST	BRA	DYN	ŽIL	LIB	SLO	SPA	TRN	TAN	PRE	ÚDA
Banik Kladno		5–0	2–1	1–2	1–0	3–2	2–0	3–0	1–1	6–1	0–0	0–1
Baník Ostrava	4–1		3–1	5–0	0–0	2–1	0–2	1–3	1–2	0–3	1–0	0–3
ČH Bratislava	1–2	2–1		4–0	1–1	4–1	0–2	1–3	1–0	2–2	0–2	2–0
Dynamo Prague	2–1	4–0	1–1		2–1	7–2	1–2	1–5	4–2	0–2	1–1	2–0
Iskra Žilina	1–2	1–0	0–1	0–2		6–1	1–2	0–0	5–0	2–1	4–0	2–2
Jiskra Liberec	3–1	2–3	1–5	0–3	0–1		0–5	0–4	0–1	1–5	0–1	3–2
Slovan Bratislava	2–0	0–1	3–1	3–1	4–0	4–2		2–0	1–0	6–0	1–1	1–1
Spartak Sokolovo Prague	3–2	2–4	4–2	6–1	1–2	4–1	1–1		1–1	1–1	5–0	1–1
Spartak Trnava	2–1	2–1	0–0	1–1	1–0	1–2	1–0	2–4		3–1	3–1	0–3
Tankista Prague	0–2	1–2	0–1	1–2	1–1	2–2	0–0	0–0	1–1		2–1	4–4
Tatran Prešov	3–1	1–0	1–2	0–0	2–0	2–1	0–0	2–1	3–0	1–0		0–3
ÚDA Prague	1–1	1–0	2–1	4–1	0–0	4–0	1–0	1–1	3–0	7–1	0–1	

Source: statistiky1ligy.fotbal.cz
Legend: Blue = home team win; Yellow = draw; Red = away team win.
