= František Vlk =

Czech footballer

Personal information
- Full name: František Vlk
- Date of birth: 30 May 1925
- Date of death: 4 August 2003 (aged 78)
- Position: Forward

Senior career*
Years	Team	Apps	(Gls)
1945–1948	Slavia Prague		
1948	ATK Praha		
1949–1950	Slavia Prague		
1950	ATK Praha		
1951	Slavia Prague		
1952	Ingstav Teplice		
1955	Jiskra Liberec		

International career
1953	Czechoslovakia B	1	(1)
1948–1953	Czechoslovakia	14	(4)
- * Club domestic league appearances and goals

František Vlk (30 May 1925 – 4 August 2003) was a Czech footballer who played as a forward. He played his club football in Czechoslovakia for Slavia Prague, ATK Praha, Ingstav Teplice and Jiskra Liberec. He celebrated the 1946–47 Czechoslovak First League title with Slavia. He died on 4 August 2003, at the age of 78.
