= Carl Fister =

Austrian-American soccer player

Personal information
- Date of birth: August 11, 1935 (age 91)
- Position: Forward

Senior career*
Years	Team	Apps	(Gls)
1960–1961	New York Hungaria		

International career
1960	United States MNT	2	(1)
Medal record
New York Hungaria
Winner	Cosmopolitan Soccer League	1960–61
- * Club domestic league appearances and goals

Carl "Karl" Fister (born August 11, 1935) is a former Austrian-American soccer center forward who earned two caps, scoring one goal, with the U.S. national team in 1960. Fister's two caps both came in matches against Mexico in qualification for the 1962 FIFA World Cup. Fister scored in the first of the two games, a 3–3 tie. However, the U.S. lost seven days later putting them out of contention for the finals.

Fister played his club ball in the German American Soccer League and was a member of the German-American League Junior All Stars tour of West Germany in July and August 1960. At the time, he played for New York Hungaria.
