= 1946 North American Soccer Football League season =

North American Soccer Football League
- Season: 1946
- Dates: 7 June- 1 September 1946
- Champions: Detroit Wolverines
- Matches played: 20
- Goals scored: 116 (5.8 per match)

The 1946 North American Soccer Football League season featured a 20-match schedule from 7 June to 1 September, with all five teams playing eight matches each. The Detroit Wolverines clinched the title on 24 August after rivals Toronto lost their second-last match of the season. Toronto won their last game of the season over Detroit on 25 August, but still finished one point back in the standings. Detroit and Toronto were then scheduled to meet in a two-match playoff, with Toronto winning the first match on 21 September. Detroit claimed that they did not want to complete the series since they had already won the league's championship.

== League standings ==
Team	Pld	W	D	L	GF	GA	GAv	Pts
Detroit Wolverines	8	5	1	2	29	25	1.160	11
Toronto Greenbacks	8	5	0	3	23	16	1.438	10
Chicago Maroons	8	4	0	4	19	21	0.905	8
Pittsburgh Strassers	8	3	0	5	23	26	0.885	6
Chicago Vikings	8	2	1	5	22	28	0.786	5

Source: rsssf.com
Rules for classification: 2pts for win and 1pt for draw

Final: Toronto defeated Detroit 3–0, __-__.

== See also ==
- 1947 North American Soccer Football League season
