= Cornelius Casey =

Irish-American soccer player

Neil Casey
Personal information
- Full name: Cornelius F. Casey
- Date of birth: January 9, 1929
- Place of birth: Cahersiveen, County Kerry, Ireland
- Date of death: October 17, 2001 (aged 72)
- Place of death: Burlington, Vermont, U.S.
- Position: Left winger

Senior career*
Years	Team	Apps	(Gls)
- New York Americans

International career
1954	United States	4	(1)
- * Club domestic league appearances and goals

Cornelius "Neil" Casey (January 9, 1929 – October 17, 2001) was a former Irish-American football (soccer) player. He earned four caps, scoring one goal, as a member of the U.S. national team.

== Youth ==
Casey was born in Cahersiveen, County Kerry, Ireland. His mother died when he was six and he lived most of his youth in a Cork City orphanage. He left the orphanage when he was eighteen, served two years in the Irish Army, then moved to the United States, settling in New York City when he was twenty-one. He work at the NYSC. Soon after his arrival he entered the U.S. Army, serving during the Korean War.

== Professional career ==
When Casey arrived in New York, he joined the German-American soccer team, most likely in the German American Soccer League. In 1951, Casey played for the New York Americans of the American Soccer League. In 1954, they won the league title and the National Challenge Cup against St Louis.

== National team ==
Casey earned all four of his caps in the four World Cup qualification matches played by the U.S. national team in 1954. His first cap came in a January 10, 1954 qualification loss to Mexico. That was followed by another loss to Mexico four days later which put the U.S. out of the cup. In April, the U.S., with Casey, flew to Haiti for two meaningless qualification games. Despite the lack of significance, the U.S. won both games, played on the third and fourth of April. Casey opened the scoring in the twentieth minute of the April 3rd game, a 3-2 U.S. victory.

== Personal life ==
Following his retirement from playing, Casey helped establish the first youth league in Ridgefield. He graduated from New York University with a bachelor's degree in engineering and later earned a master's degree in electrical engineering from the University of Connecticut. He worked for Barnes Engineering of Connecticut as an aerospace engineer for thirty-two years. He specialized in rocket guidance and infrared systems and worked on the Apollo Missions. In 1994, he retired to Vermont. Casey died of lung cancer on October 17, 2001. He is buried in Burlington, Vermont in New Mount Calvery Cemetery. Casey also had seven children, most of which reside in Fairfield County, Connecticut.

== Career statistics ==
=== International goals ===
#	Date	Venue	Opponent	Score	Result	Competition
1.	3 March 1954	Paul Magloire Stadium, Port-au-Prince, Haiti	Haiti	2-3	Win	1954 FIFA World Cup Q.
Correct as of 27 August 2011
