= Bill Sheppell =

American soccer player

Personal information
- Full name: William Ross Sheppell
- Date of birth: March 11, 1926
- Place of birth: Newark, New Jersey, United States
- Date of death: August 24, 2012 (aged 86)
- Place of death: Pleasant Plain, Ohio, United States
- Position: Forward

College career
| Years | Team | Apps | (Gls) |
| 1947–1950 | Seton Hall Pirates | | |

Senior career*
| Years | Team | Apps | (Gls) |
| 1943–1947 | Kearny Celtic | | |
| 1947–1954 | Newark German-Americans | | |

International career
| 1949–1954 | United States | 11 | (0) |
- * Club domestic league appearances and goals

William Sheppell (March 11, 1926 - August 24, 2012), also known as Billy Sheppell, was an American soccer forward who played in both the American Soccer League and German American Soccer League. He earned ten caps with the U.S. national team in 1949 and 1954 and was a member of the 1952 U.S. Olympic Soccer team.

== Club career ==
Sheppell grew up in New Jersey and attended Kearny High School where he was an outstanding high school soccer player, graduating in 1944. In 1999, he was named by The Star-Ledger as one of the top ten New Jersey high school soccer players of the 1940s-1960s.

In 1943, while still in high school, Sheppell signed with Kearny Celtic of the American Soccer League (ASL). He played with Celtic until the end of the 1946–1947 season. That year, Sheppell entered Seton Hall University, where he played on the school's soccer team. He was a 1948 Second Team and a 1950 First Team All American in 1950.

As he did in high school, Sheppell played for an outside club team during the scholastic off season. In 1947, he joined the Newark German-Americans of the German American Soccer League. He spent seven seasons with Newark, retiring from playing in 1954.

== National and Olympic teams ==
In 1948, Sheppell joined the national team for a game with Israel. While the U.S. won by a score of 3–2, the game is not recognized as an official international match.

Sheppell earned his first official cap with the U.S. national team on October 19, 1949, in a 4–0 loss to Scotland. Sheppell remained with the national team as it traveled to Mexico for the 1949 North American Cup (NAC). Participation at the 1950 FIFA World Cup was determined by the NAC, as the top two teams would qualify. The U.S. began the tournament with a 6–0 loss to Mexico, but then tied Cuba 1-1. The team again fell to Mexico 6–2, but with a 5–2 win over Cuba, finished second and qualified for the World Cup. Sheppell was a starter in all four games. However, he was not selected for the U.S. roster at the World Cup.

In 1952, Sheppell rejoined the national team for another blowout at the hands of Scotland. This time a 6–0 loss on April 30, 1952. Another two years passed before he played an international match, but he was an integral part of the national team which played four qualification games in 1954 for the 1954 FIFA World Cup. Two losses to Mexico knocked the U.S. out of contention for a berth in the finals, despite two subsequent victories over Haiti. Following these four games, Sheppell never again played for the U.S.

In 1952, Sheppell was selected for the Sheppell had also been part of the U.S. team which competed at the 1952 Summer Olympics. That tournament used a single elimination format and the U.S. lost to Italy in the first game.
