= Ruben Mendoza =

American soccer player and coach

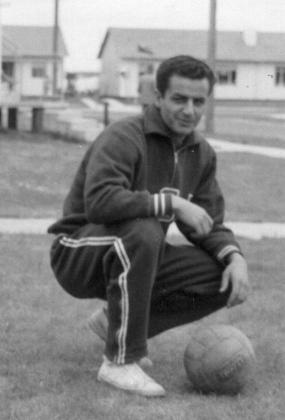
- Mendoza at the 1956 Summer Olympics

Personal information
- Full name: Ruben Michael Mendoza
- Date of birth: June 2, 1931
- Place of birth: St. Louis, Missouri, U.S.
- Date of death: April 11, 2010 (aged 78)
- Place of death: St. Louis, Missouri, U.S.
- Height: 5 ft 9 in (1.75 m)
- Position: Forward

Youth career
- 1944–1947: Atlante' Juniors

Senior career*
Years	Team	Apps	(Gls)
1951	Zenthoefer Furs	20	(20)
1952	St. Louis Raiders		
1953–1960	St. Louis Kutis		

International career
1954–1959	United States	4	(2)
- * Club domestic league appearances and goals

Ruben Michael Mendoza (June 2, 1931 – April 11, 2010) was an American soccer forward who was a dominant player in the St. Louis leagues during the 1950s and 1960s. He earned four caps with the U.S. national team and was a member of the 1952, 1956 and 1960 U.S. Olympic teams.

== Club career ==
=== Youth ===
Although he was born in St. Louis, Missouri, Mendoza's family moved to the Mexican state of Durango when he was eight. Mendoza began playing street soccer, as most young boys did at the time, while living in Durango. However, he eventually joined an organized team, the Atlante' Juniors team, going on to win the championship title in 1946.

When he was 16, Mendoza returned to the U.S. where he settled in his home town of Granite City, IL. Upon his return to the St Louis area he played for many local teams until he landed a spot with Zenthoefer Furs in 1951.

=== St. Louis leagues ===
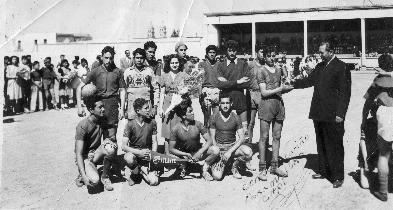
Mendoza accepts the Champions trophy as captain of the Atlante' Juniors team, Durango, Mexico, c. 1946

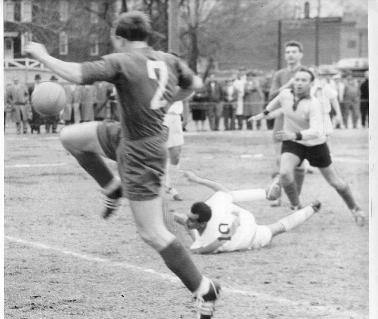
Mendoza (#10) watching his bicycle shot go into the net

Mendoza played ten seasons in the St. Louis Major League, St. Louis Municipal League and St. Louis Soccer League with Zenthoefer Furs, St. Louis Raiders and St. Louis Kutis between 1951 and 1960. A prolific goal scorer, he spent most of his years either on the left wing or as a forward where he had a reputation for his headers. Wearing the number 10 jersey, he was known throughout the league for his ability to perform and score using the "bicycle kick". Unfortunately, St. Louis teams and leagues rarely kept accurate statistics for these years so there is a lack of data.

Mendoza won the league title in 1951 with Zenthoefer before moving to Raiders for the 1952 season. That year the Raiders won both the league title and National Amateur Cup. After Raiders won the Amateur Cup, Tom Kutis, owner of the Kutis Funeral Home, began sponsoring the team. The team, now known as St. Louis Kutis, went on to win the 1953, 1954, 1957 and 1960 league titles. St. Louis Kutis went on to win the National Amateur Cup every year from 1956 to 1960. In 1954, SL Kutis was runner-up in the National Challenge Cup before taking the title in 1957. In the 1950s, the U.S. Soccer Federation (USSF) frequently had difficulty fielding the U.S. national team and in 1957, USSF selected SL Kutis to represent the U.S. in the qualifying rounds for the 1958 FIFA World Cup. Despite its domestic success, the SL Kutis team was unable to take the U.S. to the cup finals. His teammates with SL Kutis included such U.S. greats as Bill Looby, Harry Keough and Frank Borghi.

=== Yearly record ===
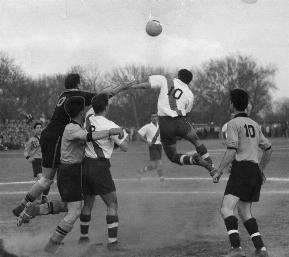
Mendoza (#10) heading ball playing for the St. Louis Kutis in the 1950s

Year	Team	Record	League	Amateur Cup	National Cup
1951	Zenthoefer Furs	16–5–2	Champion		
1952	St. Louis Raiders	15–4–2	Champion	Champion	
1953	St. Louis Kutis	12–1–3	Champion		
1954	St. Louis Kutis	14–0–1	Champion		Final
1955	St. Louis Kutis	8–?–?			
1956	St. Louis Kutis	unknown		Champion	
1957	St. Louis Kutis	unknown	Champion	Champion	Champion
1958	St. Louis Kutis	unknown		Champion	
1959	St. Louis Kutis	unknown		Champion	Semis
1960	St. Louis Kutis	unknown	Champion	Champion	Semis

=== Exhibitions ===
Mendoza's teams played various touring European club teams, winning more than they lost. For example, in 1951 Eintracht Frankfurt toured the U.S. They racked up a record of 6–2 with the only losses coming from Zenthoefers and Scottish club Celtic. In 1955, Nürnberg toured the U.S., running to a 5–1–1 record. This time Kutis, led by Mendoza, was the only U.S. team to defeat the German club, the tie coming from English club Sunderland. Finally, in 1956 Schwaben Augsburg toured the U.S., finishing 5–1. The only loss coming again from Kutis.

== International career ==
=== Senior team ===
Mendoza earned four caps with the U.S. national team between 1954 and 1959, scoring two goals. While this number does not seem impressive by today's standards, it must be recalled that these caps were earned during an era when the U.S. National Team did not play very frequently. He earned his first cap in an April 4, 1954, World Cup qualifier victory over Haiti in Port-au-Prince, Haiti. Mendoza scored the second U.S. goal in the thirty-first minute. Mendoza did not play again for the U.S. for two more years. His second game with the national team did not go as well as the first, as the U.S. was crushed 7–2 by Mexico in an April 28, 1957, World Cup qualifying match. Six weeks later, the U.S. hosted Canada in a World Cup qualifying game. While the score was closer than the Mexico game, the U.S. still lost, 3-2 despite a goal from Mendoza. Two weeks later, the U.S. was officially out of the 1958 FIFA World Cup when Canada again defeated the U.S. 5–1. This was the last game played by Mendoza.

=== Olympic teams ===
In addition to his games with the U.S. national team, Mendoza was in the starting lineup for the U.S. at both the 1952 Summer Olympics in Helsinki, Finland and the 1956 Summer Olympics in Melbourne, Australia and was a member of the 1960 U.S. Olympic squad.

The U.S. played only one game in 1952, an 8–0 loss to Italy. It had also lost to Scotland in a pre-game exhibition match. In 1956, the U.S. Olympic team went on an Asian tour prior to the games. During this tour, the U.S. performed well, raising hopes which were crushed by a 9–1 loss to Yugoslavia in the only U.S. match of the tournament. The 1960 Olympic team did not qualify for and did not attend the 1960 games.

=== Pre-1956 Olympic Games tour ===
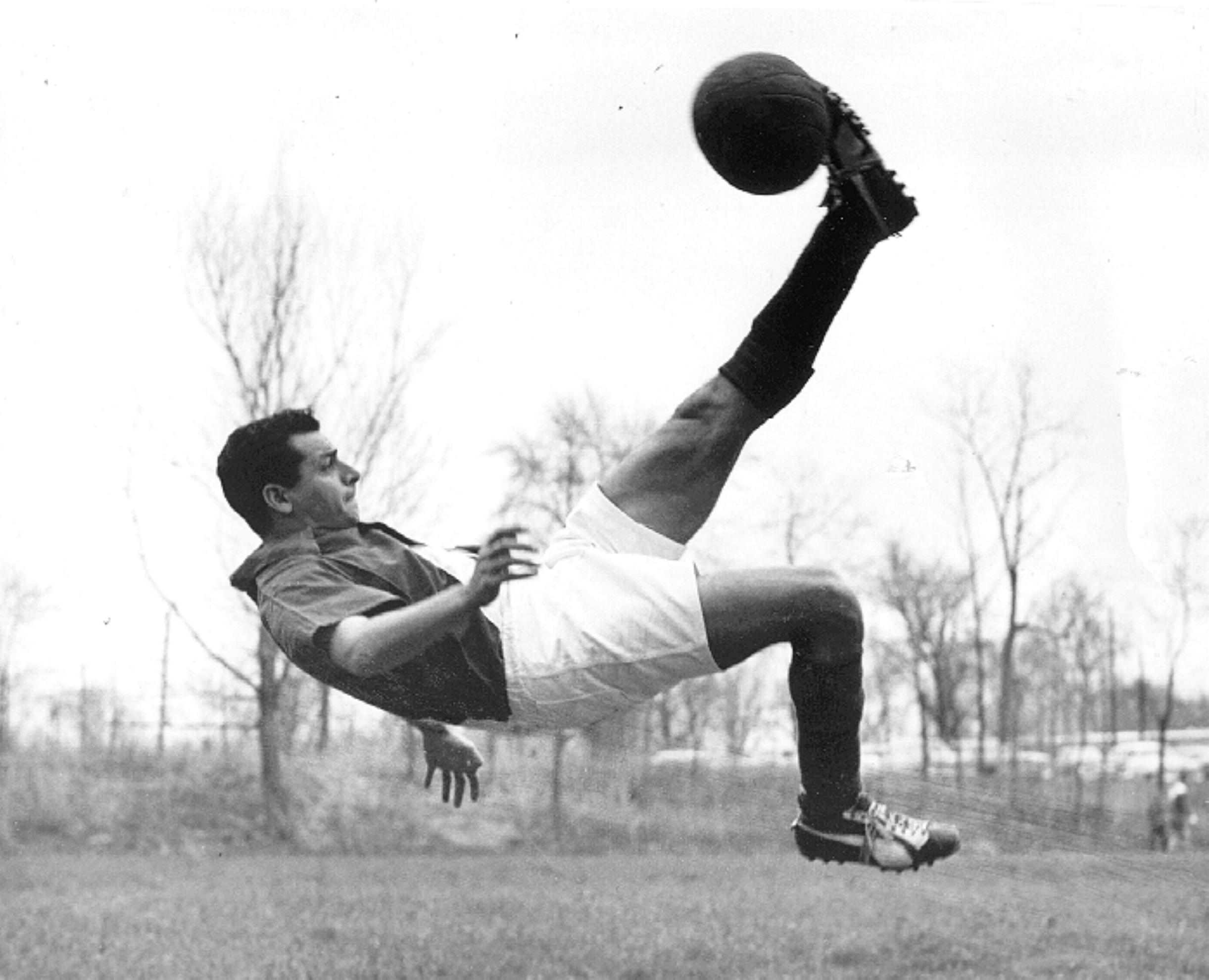
Mendoza bicycle kick

- Japan 3–5 U.S.
- Kansei 0–6 U.S.
- South Korea 1–0 U.S.
- Taiwan 1–6 U.S.
- Hong Kong 2–1 U.S.
- Philippines 0–4 U.S.
- Singapore 1–2 U.S.
- Indonesia 7–5 U.S.

== Coaching career ==
After suffering numerous knee injuries Mendoza retired from playing and moved into the coaching ranks. He began a soccer program across the river from St. Louis in Granite City, Illinois, becoming a pioneer in an area which later produced national team defender Steve Trittschuh, a former player under Mendoza. By the mid-1970s, Mendoza could claim with some accuracy that nearly every soccer player from Granite City had been either coached by him personally or by a coach trained by Mendoza. His club teams won the Illinois State Cup each year throughout the 1970s and early 1980s. One U-13 team advanced to and won the Midwest Regional competition (Detroit, MI) against 7 neighboring states.

Mendoza had the satisfaction of seeing the local high school, consisting of players who had almost entirely been coached as youth players by himself, win the Illinois high school state championship in 1972 and each year from 1976 to 1980, then again in 1982, 1987, 1989 and 1990.

On October 4, 1984, he was inducted into the St. Louis Soccer Hall of Fame.

== Death ==
Ruben Mendoza died on April 11, 2010, at Barnes–Jewish Hospital. His family said he had been battling Alzheimer's disease, diabetes and congestive heart failure.
