= St. Louis Kutis S.C. =

Kutis S.C.
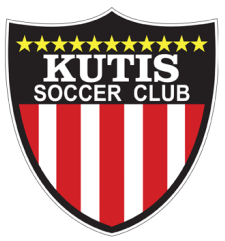
- Full name: St. Louis Kutis Soccer Club
- Founded: 1947; 78 years ago
- Website: http://kutissoccer.com/
colors

St. Louis Kutis Soccer Club, better known as St. Louis Kutis, is an amateur American soccer club in St. Louis, Missouri. Founded in 1947 as the "St. Louis Raiders", the club was known as "Paul Schulte" during the 1948–49 season, "McMahon's" during the 1949–50 season and "Zenthoefer's" in the 1950–51 season. In 1953, the team was renamed "St. Louis Kutis". The club gained its greatest prominence in the 1950s when it dominated both St. Louis and national soccer competitions. In 1958, the United States Soccer Federation used Kutis, with a few guest players, as the U.S. national team in two World Cup qualifying matches.

== History ==
=== St. Louis Raiders ===
On March 21, 1947, Gene Thumm and local businessman Nick Jost, who was inducted into the St. Louis Soccer Hall of Fame on November 11, 1976, called a meeting of soccer players and formed the Raiders club. The Raiders were established as a professional team and entered the North American Soccer Football League (NASFL) that had been established in 1946 as a professional league spanning the midwest U.S. The NASFL planned a two part season for 1947. The first half would run from April to June, the second half from September to October. The league only lasted the first half and a few games of the second half as financial difficulties led to it folding. Hall of Famer Werner Nilsen coached Raiders during 1947

With the collapse of the NASFL, Raiders became an amateur club and entered the newly established St. Louis Major League. Raiders tied St. Louis Simpkins-Ford for second in the league's standings. The team was sponsored by "Paul Schulte" for the 1948–49 season. Sponsorship was changed once again to "McMahons" for the 1949–50 season. The team regained the Raiders name briefly up to November of the 1950–51 season when Walter Zenthoefer began sponsorship of the club. In 1951, Raiders finished third in the league. Raiders dominated the 1952 St. Louis Major Soccer League season. They ran to a 15–4–2 record and took the league title with a four point lead over St. Louis Simpkins-Ford. The team also won the National Amateur Cup with a 4–3 victory over Ludlow Lusitano, but lost in the second round of the National Challenge Cup.

=== St. Louis Kutis ===
Following their victory in the National Amateur Cup, Tom Kutis of Kutis Funeral Home took over sponsorship of the team and renamed it St. Louis Kutis S.C. Some periodicals refer to Kutis as the Undertakers but this was not a common practice. When Kutis took on his new team, he decided to stock his team with local talent. St. Louis had one of the richest pools of soccer talent in the U.S. Kutis did not stop there, but also decided to sponsor three additional clubs, one adult, one for teenagers and one for boys age seven to ten. In this way, he created a club farm system which fed players to his senior team. On a side note, Kutis also sponsored several bowling, baseball, softball and basketball teams at the time.

=== Years of dominance ===
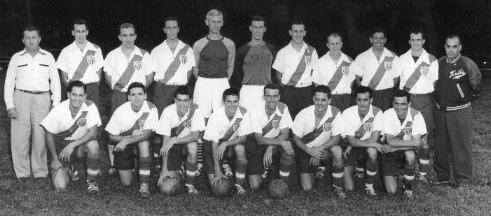
St. Louis Kutis team c. 1957.

In its first year in existence, Kutis won the St. Louis Major Soccer League title with a 12–1–3 record. In addition, the club’s lower division team took the St. Louis Municipal League Championship title. While Kutis entered the National Challenge Cup for the first time, it was an inauspicious start. The team defeated the Chicago Falcons 2–0. However the Falcons managed to show that Kutis had used ineligible players. In the replay, Kutis and Chicago played first to a scoreless tie, then in the third match, Chicago overcame Kutis 2–1. Chicago then went on to win the National Cup.

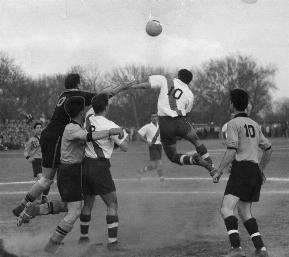
Ruben Mendoza (#10) heading the ball during a Kutis match

In 1954, the St. Louis Major Soccer League folded and was replaced by the St. Louis Municipal League, formerly the lower competition, as the city’s highest league. Since Kutis had fielded a team in both leagues in 1953, the club decided to place both in the Municipal league. The top Kutis club took the North Division title and the overall league title while the reserve team was second in the South Division. This year, Kutis made it to the National Challenge Cup Final, before falling 1–0 and 2–0 to the professional New York Americans.

The Municipal League folded at the end of the 1954 season, to be replaced by the Khoury League. However, Kutis decided to withdraw his club from league play and field it as an independent team playing an exhibition schedule only. While this schedule featured teams mainly from St. Louis and Chicago, Kutis also took on Nürnberg (a 3–2 victory).

Kutis S.C. kit worn in the 1950s

Despite not playing in an organized league for the rest of the decade, Kutis rose to become one of the dominant teams on a national level. They went on to win the National Amateur Cup six consecutive years (1956–1961) and were perennial contenders for the National Challenge Cup, finally winning the title in 1957.

In 1957-58, the success of Kutis was such that the Soccer Federation chose it to represent the U.S. in the two 1958 FIFA World Cup qualifying matches that year. During World Cup qualifications, Kutis club lost to the Canadian national team 3-2 on July 6, 1957 in St. Louis. In 1960, one of the Kutis club teams won the St. Louis Municipal League title. In 1963 and 1964, the Junior Team took the National Junior Cup titles.

=== Years of decline ===
Kutis continued to find success into the late 1960s, mostly in the National Amateur Cup. However, by the late 1960s, the rise first of the National Professional Soccer League then its successor league, the North American Soccer League, saw the rapid rise in professional U.S. soccer. By the early 1970s a local amateur club such as Kutis could no longer compete successfully.

=== Brief resurgence ===
The collapse of the NASL in the early 1980s, accompanied by the collapse of the American Soccer League, led to a brief resurgence of local and independent "super clubs" such as Kutis. This resurgence put them back into contention for the U.S. Cup in the mid and late 1980s, but as the various independent clubs began to coalesce into leagues, such as the Western Soccer League, third American Soccer League and the Lone Star Soccer Alliance, Kutis again faded from the national scene. In 2007, Kutis forfeited its Open Cup qualifying game with AAFC Elite.

Nowadays, Kutis S.C. focus on children's soccer.

== Record ==
Year	League	Regular Season	Amateur Cup	National Cup
1947	NASFL	3rd		
1947–1948	SLML	2d		
1948				
1949				
1950				
1951	SLML	3rd		
1952	SLML	Champion	Champion	Second round
1953	12–1–3	Champion		Western Final
1954	14–0–1	Champion		Final
1955	8–0–0	Did not enter		
1956			Champion	
1957			Champion	Champion
1958			Champion	
1959			Champion	Semifinals
1960		Champion	Champion	Semifinals
1961			Champion	
1962				Semifinals
1963				Semifinals
1964				Quarterfinals
1965				Quarterfinals
1966				
1967			Final	Quarterfinals
1968				
1969			Final	
1970				
1971			Champion	
1972				
1973				
1974				
1975				Semifinals
1976				
1977				
1978				
1979				
1980				Region II Final
1981				
1982				
1983				Final
1984				
1985				Final
1986				Champion

== Coaches ==
- Werner Nilsen 1946–1947
- Bob Corbett 1947–1948
- Joe Carenza, Sr 1954–
- Jim Henson 1986
- Tony Glavin 1991–2000

== Honors ==
- National Challenge Cup (2): 1957, 1986
- Runners-up (3): 1954, 1983, 1985
- National Amateur Cup (8): 1952, 1956, 1957, 1958, 1959, 1960, 1961, 1971
- Runners-up (2): 1967, 1969
- St. Louis Major Soccer League (3): 1952, 1953, 1954
- Runners-up (1): 1948
- St. Louis Municipal Soccer League (1): 1960
