= Alfredo Torres =

Mexican footballer (1935–2022)

Personal information
- Full name: Juan Alfredo Torres González
- Date of birth: 31 May 1935
- Place of birth: Zapopan, Jalisco, Mexico
- Date of death: 10 November 2022 (aged 87)
- Place of death: Guadalajara
- Position: Forward

Youth career
- Imperio

Senior career*
Years	Team	Apps	(Gls)
1951–1970	Atlas		

International career
1953–1954	Mexico	5	(2)

Managerial career
- 1971–1972: Atlas
- 1976–1977: Atlas
- 1978–1980: Atlas
- 1984–1985: Atlas
- 1986: Atlas
- * Club domestic league appearances and goals

Juan Alfredo Torres González (31 May 1935 – 10 November 2022) was a Mexican footballer who played as a forward. He played for the Mexico national team in the 1954 FIFA World Cup.

== Career ==
Torres began playing youth football with local side Club Imperio. He joined Club Atlas at age 16, and would spend nearly twenty years playing for the club. He also participated in the first match held at Estadio Jalisco on 31 January 1960.

After he retired from playing football in 1970, Torres became a manager. He led Atlas on several occasions, helping the club gain promotion to the Primera in the 1971–72 and 1978–79 seasons.
