= José Naranjo (footballer, born 1926) =

Mexican footballer

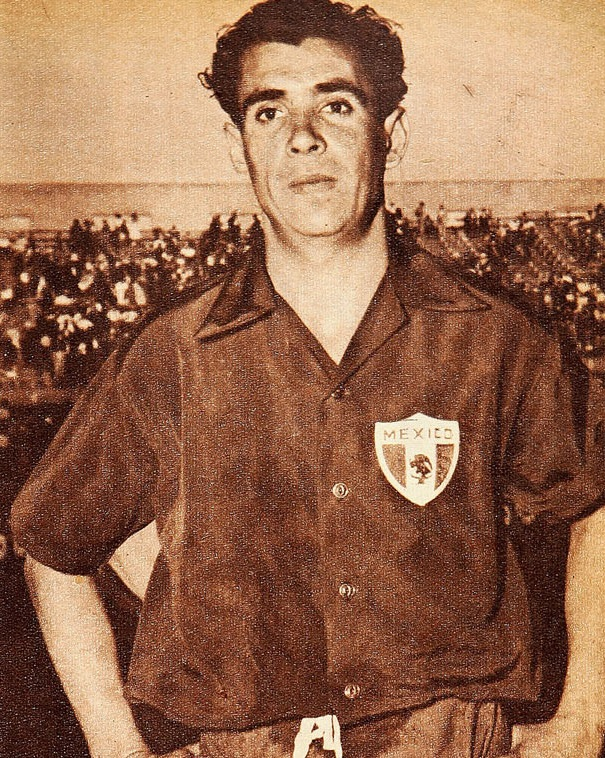

Personal information
- Full name: José Naranjo Rivera
- Date of birth: 19 March 1926
- Place of birth: La Experiencia, Jalisco, Mexico
- Date of death: 13 December 2012 (aged 86)
- Position: Forward

Senior career*
Years	Team	Apps	(Gls)
- CD Oro

International career
1949–1956	Mexico	15	(3)
- * Club domestic league appearances and goals

José Naranjo Rivera (19 March 1926 – 13 December 2012) was a Mexican football forward who played for Mexico in the 1950 and 1954 FIFA World Cups. He also played for CD Oro.
