= Pittsburgh Indians =

Mid-twentieth-century American soccer club

Pittsburgh Indians were a mid-twentieth-century American soccer club based in Pittsburgh, Pennsylvania. It began as Pittsburgh Stasser before becoming the Indians in 1947.

== History ==
In 1946, several successful Midwest U.S. teams organized the first professional, regional soccer league outside of the east coast. The North American Soccer Football League played an eight-game season in 1946, then the first half of the 1947 season before collapsing in the fall of 1947. Peter Strasser entered a team, known as Pittsburgh Stasser in the league. Pittsburgh was renamed the Indians in 1947 and led the standings for the first half of the season. As the league collapsed soon after, they are considered the de facto 1947 champions.

== Year-by-year ==
Year	League	Reg. season	Challenge Cup
1946	NASFL	3rd	?
1947	NASFL	1st	?
