= Bill Looby =

American soccer player

Personal information
- Full name: William Edward Looby
- Date of birth: November 20, 1931
- Place of birth: St. Louis, Missouri, U.S.
- Date of death: December 9, 1998 (aged 67)
- Place of death: St. Louis, Missouri, U.S.
- Height: 5 ft 11 in (1.80 m)
- Position: Forward

Senior career*
Years	Team	Apps	(Gls)
1949–1950	Dohle's		
1950	→ Lennemann's		
1950	Zenthoefer Furs		
1950–1952	St. Louis Raiders		
1954–1970	→ St. Louis Kutis		

International career
1954–1959	United States	9	(6)
Medal record
Men's soccer
Representing the United States
Pan American Games
Bronze medal – third place	1959 Chicago	Team competition
- * Club domestic league appearances and goals

Bill Looby (November 20, 1931 – December 9, 1998) was an American soccer forward who spent his entire career in the St. Louis Leagues. He was a member of the U.S. Olympic soccer team at the 1956 Summer Olympics and earned nine caps, scoring six goals, with the United States men's national soccer team between 1954 and 1959. He was a member of the 1959 bronze medal Pan American Team, scoring six goals in those games as well. Looby is a member of the Saint Louis Soccer Hall of Fame and the National Soccer Hall of Fame.

== Professional ==
Looby played forward both professionally and for the U.S. national team. In the fall of 1949, he played for Dohle's of the St. Louis Major League. In January 1950, the team was briefly renamed Selby's before becoming Lenneman's as the team's sponsorship changed.

In April 1950, Looby signed with Zenthoefer Furs in the St. Louis Municipal League.

In the fall of 1950, he joined the St. Louis Raiders which won the National Amateur Cup in 1952. After that victory, Tom Kutis, owner of the Kutis Funeral Home, began to sponsor the team.

Looby played the next two seasons with the Grapette Soccer team, rejoining the team, now known as St. Louis Kutis, in 1954, where he played until 1970. In 1954, he led the Municipal League in scoring. Looby played in Kutis' six consecutive National Amateur Cup championships (1956–1961). He also scored goals in both games of the 1957 National Challenge Cup championship over New York Hakoah. In 1958, the U.S. Soccer Football Association used the Kutis team as the U.S. national team in two world cup qualifying games against Canada. Another memorable event for Looby as a Kutis team member took place on May 5, 1955, when Kutis defeated 1. FC Nürnberg, 3–2. Looby scored a goal in this game. The Nürnberg team in 1955 featured four players from the 1954 West German World Cup championship team. Seven years later, in 1962, Kutis defeated Nurenberg a second time by the same score of 3–2. Looby also scored a goal in this game.

== National team ==
In 1954 Looby became a member of the U.S. National Team. In 1956, he played for the U.S. Olympic team at the 1956 Summer Olympics. He also played in several games in the U.S. team's tour of the Orient leading up to the Olympic games in Australia. Looby earned nine caps with the senior national team, scoring six goals. He earned his first cap and scored his first goal for the U.S. in a 1954 World Cup qualifier against Mexico. He played his last game with the national team in 1959.

In 1959, Looby was a member of the U.S. Pan American team which took the bronze medal. He scored six goals in that tournament.

He was also a member of the 1960 U.S. Olympic team, a finalist for the 1952 US Olympic team, and an alternate for the 1964 Olympic team.

He was inducted into the St. Louis Soccer Hall of Fame in 1984 and the National Soccer Hall of Fame in 2001.
