= José Luis Lamadrid =

Mexican footballer (1930–2021)

Personal information
- Full name: José Luis Lamadrid Prados
- Date of birth: 3 July 1930
- Place of birth: Mexico City, Mexico
- Date of death: 3 October 2021 (aged 91)
- Position: Forward

Senior career*
Years	Team	Apps	(Gls)
1949–1950	Club España		
1950–1951	Club América		
1951–1954	Necaxa		
1954–1955	Toluca		
1955–1956	Club América		
1957	C.D. Cuautla		

International career
1952–1954	Mexico	7	(5)
- * Club domestic league appearances and goals

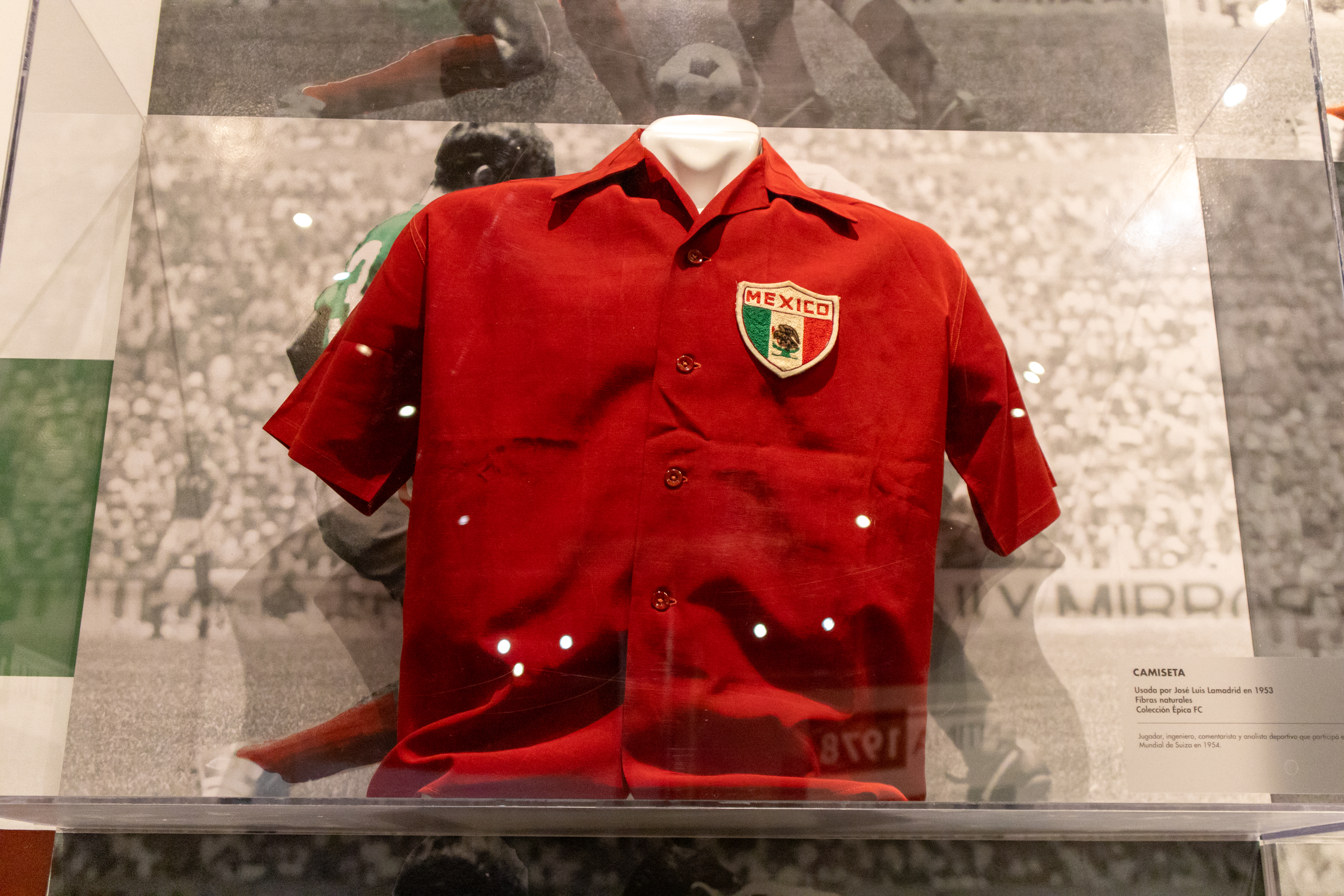
Shirt worn by José Luis Lamadrid in 1953.

José Luis Lamadrid Prados (3 July 1930 – 3 October 2021) was a Mexican professional footballer who played as a forward for Club Necaxa and who represented Mexico in the 1954 FIFA World Cup. He was also a commentator along with Fernando Marcos for TV Azteca in the 1990s.
