= Jiskra Liberec =

- Full name: Jiskra Liberec
- Founded: 1922
- Dissolved: 1958

Jiskra Liberec was a Czechoslovak football club from the town of Liberec, which played one season in the Czechoslovak First League. It was founded in 1922 as Rapid Horní Růžodol. The club featured in the 1955 Czechoslovak First League, finishing bottom of the league and winning only three of their 22 matches.

The club ceased to exist in 1958, following a merger with Slavoj Liberec to form a new club, Slovan Liberec.

== Historical names ==
- 1922 – Rapid Horní Růžodol
- 1945 – Rapid Liberec
- 1948 – Sokol Liberec–Horní Růžodol
- 1950 – Kolora Liberec
- 1953 – Jiskra Kolora Liberec
- 1956 – Lokomotiva Liberec
- 1957 – Jiskra Sběrné suroviny Liberec
- 1958 – merged with Slavoj Liberec to form Slovan Liberec
