= Chung Nam-sik =

South Korean footballer and manager

Chung Nam-sik 정남식
Personal information
- Full name: Chung Nam-sik
- Date of birth: 16 February 1917
- Place of birth: Gimje, Zenrahoku-dō, Korea, Empire of Japan
- Date of death: 5 April 2005 (aged 88)
- Place of death: South Korea
- Position: Striker

Senior career*
Years	Team	Apps	(Gls)
- Bosung College
- Joseon Industries FC
- Joseon Textile FC
- Defense Security Command (army)

International career
1946–1954	South Korea		

Managerial career
- 1959: South Korea (coach)
- 1965–1966: South Korea
Medal record
Men's football
Representing South Korea
Asian Games
Silver medal – second place	1954 Manila	Team
- * Club domestic league appearances and goals

Chung Nam-sik (Korean: 정남식; Hanja: 鄭南湜, 16 February 1917 – 5 April 2005) was a Korean football player and manager. He played as a striker for the South Korea national team during the 1940s and 1950s, including at the 1948 Summer Olympics.

== Honors ==
=== Manager ===
South Korea

- Merdeka Tournament: 1965
