= Deaths in September 2013 =

The following is a list of notable deaths in September 2013.

Entries for each day are listed alphabetically by surname. A typical entry lists information in the following sequence:

- Name, age, country of citizenship and reason for notability, established cause of death, reference.

== September 2013 ==
=== 1 ===
- Manuel Andrés, 83, Spanish writer and actor, respiratory failure.
- Zvonko Bušić, 67, Croatian airplane hijacker (TWA Flight 355), suicide by gunshot.
- Joaquim Justino Carreira, 63, Portuguese-born Brazilian Roman Catholic prelate, Bishop of Guarulhos (since 2011).
- Pál Csernai, 80, Hungarian footballer and manager (FC Bayern Munich, North Korea).
- Ignacio Eizaguirre, 92, Spanish footballer (Valencia, Real Sociedad, national team).
- Ole Ernst, 73, Danish actor.
- Philip I. Marcus, 86, American virologist.
- Tommy Morrison, 44, American heavyweight champion boxer (WBO) and actor (Rocky V), multiple organ failure.
- Chris Packer, 60, Australian sailor.
- Christoph Schumann, 44, German political scientist.
- Gordon Steege, 95, Australian military officer, RAAF flying ace.
- Margaret Mary Vojtko, 83, American linguist.
- Ken Wallis, 97, British autogyro exponent and James Bond stunt pilot.

=== 2 ===
- Levon Ananyan, 66, Armenian journalist and translator.
- Valérie Benguigui, 52, French César Award-winning actress, breast cancer.
- Terry Clawson, 73, English rugby league player.
- Ronald Coase, 102, British economist, laureate of the Nobel Prize in Economics (1991).
- Paul Danilo, 94, American soccer player and coach.
- Arthur J. Deikman, 83, American psychiatrist, Parkinson's disease.
- Ricardo Elmont, 58, Surinamese judoka.
- David Jacobs, 87, British radio and television broadcaster (Juke Box Jury, Any Questions?).
- Pablo Krögh, 50, Chilean actor (Dawson Isla 10), tongue cancer.
- Olga Lowe, 93, British stage and film actress.
- Makoto Moroi, 82, Japanese composer.
- Noel Olsen, 67, British doctor, prostate cancer.
- Frederik Pohl, 93, American science fiction author (Man Plus, Gateway).
- Henry Putzel Jr., 99, American lawyer and Reporter of Decisions of the United States Supreme Court.
- Shahid Qureshi, 77, Pakistani cricketer.
- Isidro Sánchez García-Figueras, 76, Spanish footballer.
- Sir Paul Scoon, 78, Grenadian politician, Governor-General (1978–1992).
- Boris Sergeyevich Sokolov, 99, Russian geologist and paleontologist.
- Alain Testart, 67, French social anthropologist.
- Hugh van Cutsem, 72, British horse breeder.
- Dame Juliet Wheldon, 63, British civil servant.

=== 3 ===
- Anna Beneck, 71, Italian butterfly swimmer.
- Ariel Castro, 53, American convicted kidnapper and rapist, suicide by hanging.
- Alvin Eisenman, 92, American graphic designer and academic.
- Donald Featherstone, 95, British wargamer, complications from a fall.
- Pedro Ferriz Santa Cruz, 92, Mexican journalist.
- Albert Heffer, 79, South African cricketer.
- Ralph M. Holman, 99, American judge, Associate Justice of the Oregon Supreme Court (1965–1980).
- José Ramón Larraz, 84, Spanish movie director (Vampyres) and comics writer.
- Janet Lembke, 80, American writer.
- Rick McCann, 69, Canadian ice hockey player (Detroit Red Wings).
- Don Meineke, 82, American basketball player (Fort Wayne Pistons).
- Lewis Morley, 88, British Hong Kong-born Australian photographer (Christine Keeler, Joe Orton).
- Dick Ukeiwé, 84, New Caledonian politician, member of the French Senate (1983–1992) and the European Parliament (1989–1994).nut

=== 4 ===
- Ferdinand Biwersi, 79, German football referee.
- Raphael Dinyando, 53, Namibian politician and diplomat, Ambassador to Austria (since 2010), MP for Rundu (2000–2010), Mayor of Rundu (1993–1998), cancer.
- Sir Arthur George, 98, Australian lawyer and soccer administrator.
- Sankie Maimo, 82–83, Cameroonian dramatist and playwright.
- Michel Pagé, 63, Canadian politician.
- Jules Paivio, 97, Canadian cartographer and teacher, last surviving Canadian veteran of the Spanish Civil War.
- Dick Raaijmakers, 83, Dutch composer, theater maker and theorist.
- Lennart Risberg, 78, Swedish Olympic light-heavyweight boxer (1956).
- Daniele Seccarecci, 33, Italian bodybuilder, heaviest male competitor, myocardial infarction.
- Stanislav Stepashkin, 73, Soviet Olympic boxing champion (1964).
- Shinya Taniguchi, 32, Japanese Olympic swimmer (2000), stomach cancer.
- Casey Viator, 62, American bodybuilder, AAU Mr. America (1971), heart attack.
- Joe Warham, 93, English rugby league coach (Leeds).

=== 5 ===
- Sushmita Banerjee, 49, Indian writer, shot. (body discovered on this date)
- Edwin Bideau, 62, American politician, member of the Kansas House of Representatives (1985–1988, since 2012).
- Mel Cooke, 79, New Zealand rugby league player (Canterbury).
- Robert Farrar Capon, 87, American Episcopal priest and author.
- Willie Frazier, 71, American football player (Houston Oilers, San Diego Chargers).
- Geoffrey Goodman, 91, British journalist and trade unionist.
- Lakhumal Hiranand Hiranandani, 96, Indian otorhinolaryngologist, social activist and philanthropist.
- Isamu Jordan, 37, American journalist, musician and academic, suicide.
- Maurice Lerner, 77, American Mafia hit man.
- Lloyd Mayer, 63, American gastroenterologist and immunologist, brain cancer.
- Rochus Misch, 96, German SS non-commissioned officer, last survivor of the Führerbunker.
- Gene Nottolini, 69, American judge, leukemia.
- Marijan Novović, 66, Serbian basketball coach and player.
- John H. Stennis, 78, American politician, member of the Mississippi House of Representatives (1969–1984).
- Mireya Véliz, 98, Chilean actress.
- Sangeen Zadran, 45, Pakistani militant, shadow governor of Paktika Province, drone strike.

=== 6 ===
- Ann C. Crispin, 63, American science fiction author (The Han Solo Trilogy, Sarek), bladder cancer.
- Dick Hess, 74, American politician, member of the Pennsylvania House of Representatives (since 1987), complications from surgery.
- Barbara Hicks, 89, English actress (Brazil, Howards End).
- Bobby Martin, 83, American music producer, arranger and songwriter.
- Khin Maung Kyi, 86, Burmese economist.
- Santiago Rosario, 74, Puerto Rican baseball player (Kansas City Athletics).
- Sir Cameron Rusby, 87, British vice admiral.
- Adin Talbar, 91, German-born Israeli diplomat.
- Bill Wallis, 76, British actor (Brazil, The Other Boleyn Girl, War and Remembrance).
- Frederick Zugibe, 85, American medical examiner and Shroud of Turin investigator.

=== 7 ===
- Jean Anyon, 72, American educationalist.
- Albert Allen Bartlett, 90, American physicist.
- Romesh Bhandari, 85, Indian politician, Foreign Secretary (1985–1986), Governor of Uttar Pradesh (1996–1998).
- Frank Blevins, 74, Australian politician, Deputy Premier of South Australia (1992–1993), cancer.
- Alexander Cools, 71, Dutch behavioral pharmacologist.
- Wolfgang Frank, 62, German football player and coach, cancer.
- Susan Fuentes, 58, Filipino singer, complications from kidney ailment.
- Joseph Granville, 90, American financial writer, pneumonia.
- Barney Hayhoe, Baron Hayhoe, 88, British politician, MP for Heston and Isleworth (1970–1974) and Brentford and Isleworth (1974–1992).
- Pete Hoffman, 94, American cartoonist.
- Ilja Hurník, 90, Czech composer and essayist.
- Fred Katz, 94, American jazz cellist and composer.
- Kuluypa Konduchalova, 93, Soviet-born Kyrgyz teacher and politician, Minister of Culture (1958–1980).
- Ted Loden, 73, British army colonel, shot.
- Mehdi Mohammadi, 60, Iranian football player and coach, heart attack.
- Vitthalbhai Patel, 78, Indian songwriter and politician.
- Barry Smith, 58, Canadian ice hockey player (Boston Bruins).
- Marek Špilár, 38, Slovak footballer, suicide by self-defenestration.
- Dokka Umarov, 49, Chechen Islamic extremist militant, poisoned.

=== 8 ===
- Fernando Compte, 82, Spanish wrestler.
- Louise Currie, 100, American film actress (Adventures of Captain Marvel, Citizen Kane).
- Loo-Chi Hu, 88, Chinese-born New Zealand marine equipment designer, fisheries consultant and tai chi teacher.
- Léopold Jorédié, 66, New Caledonian politician, Vice President (1999–2001).
- Ahmed Kebaili, 88, Algerian cyclist.
- José Guadalupe Padilla Lozano, 92, Mexican Roman Catholic prelate, Bishop of Veracruz (1963–2000).
- Don Reichert, 81, Canadian artist.
- Harris Rowe, 89, American politician, businessman, and lawyer.
- Tore Sinding-Larsen, 83, Norwegian judge.
- Lacey Baldwin Smith, 90, American historian.
- Jean Véronis, 58, French linguist and blogger.
- Carl von Gerber, 82, Swedish Olympic sprint canoer (1960, 1964).
- Cal Worthington, 92, American car dealer, natural causes.

=== 9 ===
- Sunila Abeysekera, 61, Sri Lankan human rights campaigner.
- Alberto Bevilacqua, 79, Italian writer and film director, cardiac arrest.
- Patricia Blair, 80, American actress (The Rifleman, Daniel Boone), breast cancer.
- Champignon, 35, Brazilian musician (Charlie Brown Jr., Revolucionnários, A Banca), suicide by gunshot.
- Susan Fitzgerald, 64, Irish actress (Angela's Ashes), colorectal cancer.
- Forrest, 60, American singer, stroke.
- Saburo Kamei, 75, Japanese voice actor (Fist of the North Star).
- Saul Landau, 77, American filmmaker, bladder cancer.
- Mamafaka, 34, Thai graphic designer and street artist, surfing incident.
- Dorothy Swain Lewis, 97, American aviator.
- Bill Ray, 91, American politician, member of the Alaska House of Representatives (1965–1971) and Senate (1971–1987).
- Rebecca Sedwick, 12, American cyberbullying victim, suicide by jumping.
- Gunnar Høst Sjøwall, 77, Norwegian photographer.
- Shalom Yoran, 88, Polish Jewish partisan and author (The Defiant).

=== 10 ===
- Robert Chamberlin, 93, American Politician
- Damian Gardiner, 44, Irish Olympic equestrian, esophageal cancer.
- Richard Grey, 6th Earl Grey, 74, British peer and businessman.
- György Gurics, 84, Hungarian Olympic wrestler, bronze medalist (1952).
- John Hambrick, 73, American television news anchor (WNBC, WEWS), actor and announcer, lung cancer.
- Barry Hancock, 74, English footballer (Port Vale).
- Ibrahim Makhous, 88, Syrian politician.
- Constantin Moldoveanu, 69, Romanian soccer player.
- Anne-Sylvie Mouzon, 57, Belgian politician, member of the Brussels Regional Parliament (since 1989), cancer.
- Don Nelson, 86, American screenwriter (The Adventures of Ozzie and Harriet), Parkinson's disease.
- Josef Němec, 79, Czech Olympic boxer, bronze medalist (1960).
- Lyn Peters, 72, Argentine-born British model and actress (Get Smart, Hogan's Heroes).
- Glen Pommerening, 85, American politician and lawyer.
- Peter Paul Prabhu, 82, Indian Roman Catholic prelate, Archbishop of Tituli in Numidia (since 1993).
- Ivan Sag, 63, American linguist, cancer.
- Clay Shaw, 74, American politician, member of U.S. House of Representatives from Florida (1981–2007), Mayor of Fort Lauderdale (1975–1981), lung cancer.
- Kjell Sjöberg, 76, Swedish Olympic ski jumper.
- Glen Skov, 82, Canadian ice hockey player (Detroit Red Wings).
- Corey Swinson, 43, American football player (St. Louis Rams).
- Jack Vance, 80, Canadian army lieutenant general.

=== 11 ===
- Marshall Berman, 72, American philosopher and writer.
- Fernand Boone, 79, Belgian footballer.
- Francisco Chavez, 66, Filipino human rights lawyer, Solicitor General (1987–1992), stroke.
- Ramachandra Deva, 67, Indian poet, playwright and critic.
- Keith Dunstan, 88, Australian newspaper columnist and writer, cancer.
- Jimmy Fontana, 78, Italian singer-songwriter ("Il mondo"), composer ("Che sarà") and actor (Crazy Desire).
- Edith Guillaume, 69–70, Danish mezzo-soprano.
- Albert Jacquard, 87, French geneticist and essayist.
- Albert Jones, 93, New Zealand amateur astronomer.
- Pierre Léon, 87, French-Canadian linguist and writer, cancer.
- Flora Arca Mata, 95, American teacher.
- Demetrius Newton, 85, American politician and civil rights attorney.
- Fritz Nussbaum, 89, Swiss Olympic athlete.
- Mats Olsson, 83, Swedish musician.
- Prince Jazzbo, 62, Jamaican reggae DJ, lung cancer.
- Virgil A. Richard, 76, American army brigadier general.
- William Sullivan, 91, American politician and lawyer, member of the Kentucky Senate (1954–1958, 1966–1982).
- Andrzej Trybulec, 72, Polish mathematician and computer scientist.
- Tom Vernon, 74, British writer and broadcaster (Fat Man series), heart attack.

=== 12 ===
- Fathi Tawfiq Abdulrahim, Yemeni politician and businessman.
- Abu Mansoor Al-Amriki, 29, American Islamist, shot. (death announced on this date)
- Ray Dolby, 80, American audio engineer and inventor (Dolby NR, surround sound), leukemia.
- Warren Giese, 89, American college football coach and politician, member of the South Carolina Senate (1985–2004).
- William Graham, 87, American television director (The X-Files, Batman, The Fugitive), pneumonia.
- Sheldon Hackney, 79, American educationalist.
- Erich Loest, 87, German author and screenwriter (Nikolaikirche), suicide by self-defenestration.
- Rod Masterson, 68, American actor (Tightrope), complications from Parkinson's disease.
- Candace Pert, 67, American neuroscientist, cardiovascular arrest.
- Vinod Raina, Indian educationist, cancer.
- Joan Regan, 85, British traditional pop singer.
- Otto Sander, 72, German actor (Wings of Desire, Das Boot).
- Robert Steiner, 95, British radiologist.
- Avrum Stroll, 92, American philosopher and author.
- Frank Tripucka, 85, American football player (Denver Broncos, Detroit Lions), heart failure.

=== 13 ===
- Olusegun Agagu, 65, Nigerian politician, Governor of Ondo State (2003–2009).
- Rafiquddin Ahmad, 81, Bangladeshi businessman and educationalist.
- Peter Aston, 74, English composer.
- Robert J. Behnke, 83, American fisheries biologist.
- James Bradford, 84, American Olympic weightlifter (1952, 1960).
- Rick Casares, 82, American football player (Chicago Bears).
- Ronnie Clark, 81, Scottish footballer.
- Nora Daza, 84, Filipina chef.
- Carlos Eiras, 81, Argentine Olympic skier.
- Wayne Green, 91, American magazine publisher.
- Jimmy Herman, 72, Canadian actor (Dances with Wolves, North of 60, Grey Owl).
- Anwar Hossain, 82, Bangladeshi actor.
- Dan Osinski, 79, American baseball player (Los Angeles Angels, Boston Red Sox).
- Antoneta Papapavli, 75, Albanian stage actress.
- Methodius Petrovtsy, 72, Ukrainian Orthodox bishop.
- Patti Webster, 49, American publicist (Usher, Janet Jackson), brain cancer.

=== 14 ===
- Maksym Bilyi, 24, Ukrainian footballer, brain tumor.
- Sir John Curtiss, 88, British Royal Air Force officer.
- Osama El-Baz, 83, Egyptian diplomat.
- Faith Leech, 72, Australian Olympic champion freestyle swimmer (1956).
- Roy Mackal, 88, American biologist, cryptozoologist, and author, heart failure.
- Athar Mahmood, 61, Pakistani diplomat.
- Peter Morley, 84, British businessman and football club chairman (Crystal Palace).
- Jorge Pedreros, 71, Chilean musician and comedian, pneumonia.
- Apoorva Sengupta, 75, Indian cricketer.
- Amund Venger, 69, Norwegian politician.

=== 15 ===
- Sanaullah Khan Niazi, 53, Pakistani general, roadside IED blast.
- Munzir Al-Musawa, 40, Indonesian Islamic scholar, complications of asthma and encephalitis.
- Jerry G. Bishop, 77, American disc jockey and television personality, creator of Svengoolie, heart attack.
- Gerard Cafesjian, 88, American businessman and philanthropist.
- Margaret Cooper, 91, English nurse and nurse-tutor.
- Henry Rudolph Immerwahr, 97, German classical scholar.
- Elizabeth Wright Ingraham, 91, American architect and educator, congestive heart failure.
- Joyce Jacobs, 91, British-born Australian actress (A Country Practice).
- Jackie Lomax, 69, English guitarist and singer-songwriter.
- William Clyde Martin Jr., 83, American physicist.
- Assan Musa Camara, 91, Gambian politician, Foreign Minister (1967–1974), Vice President (1972–1982), President (1981).
- Tomás Ó Canainn, 82, Irish uilleann piper.
- Émile Turlant, 109, French centenarian, France's oldest living man.
- Paolo Zantelli, 48, Italian F2 racing boat pilot, boat race collision.

=== 16 ===
- Scott Adams, 46, American football player (Minnesota Vikings, New Orleans Saints), heart attack.
- Philip Berg, 86, American rabbi, Leader of the Kabbalah Centre (since 1969).
- Jack Britto, 87, Pakistani Olympic hockey player (1952).
- Mac Curtis, 74, American rockabilly singer, injuries received in a traffic collision.
- David Cheung, 77, Hong Kong educator and pastor, member of the Legislative Council of Hong Kong (1988–1991).
- Daniel Díaz Torres, 64, Cuban film director, cancer.
- Ratiba El-Hefny, 82, Egyptian opera singer and director (Cairo Opera House).
- Stanley Elkins, 88, American historian.
- Susan Farmer, 71, American politician, Secretary of State of Rhode Island (1982–1986), cancer.
- Eduardo García de Enterría, 90, Spanish jurist, awarded Prince of Asturias Award for Social Sciences (1984).
- Terrie Hall, 53, American CDC spokesperson and anti-tobacco advocate, cancer.
- Kim Hamilton, 81, American actress (To Kill a Mockingbird, Days of Our Lives, Star Trek: The Next Generation).
- Joan Hanke-Woods, 67, American Hugo Award-winning artist.
- George Hockham, 74, British electrical engineer.
- Tammareddy Krishna Murthy, 93, Indian film producer.
- Jim Palmer, 80, American basketball player (New York Knicks).
- Juan Luis Panero, 71, Spanish poet.
- Chin Peng, 89, Malaysian politician, leader of the Malayan Communist Party.
- Jimmy Ponder, 67, American jazz guitarist, lung cancer.
- Howard Sheppard, 79, Canadian politician, member of the Legislative Assembly of Ontario (1981–1987).
- Fred Sherman, 81, American biologist.
- David Avraham Spector, 58, Dutch-born Israeli rabbi, cancer.
- Patsy Swayze, 86, American dancer and choreographer (Urban Cowboy, Hope Floats, Big Top Pee-wee), complications from a stroke.
- Arend van der Wel, 80, Dutch football player.

=== 17 ===
- Otha Bailey, 83, American Negro league baseball player.
- Ted Connelly, 94, Australian politician, Speaker of the South Australian House of Assembly (1975–1977).
- Martí de Riquer i Morera, 99, Spanish Catalan linguist and nobleman, 8th Count of Casa Dávalos, veteran of the Spanish Civil War.
- Michael Giannatos, 72, Greek actor (Midnight Express, Munich, Captain Corelli's Mandolin), heart attack.
- Kristian Gidlund, 29, Swedish musician (Sugarplum Fairy) and journalist, stomach cancer.
- Larry Lake, 70, American-born Canadian broadcaster and musician.
- Peter K. Leisure, 84, American senior judge of the District Court for the Southern District of New York.
- Pierre Macq, 83, Belgian physicist, Rector of Universite Catholique de Louvain (1986–1995).
- Jack Mangan, 86, Irish Gaelic footballer.
- Bernie McGann, 76, Australian jazz alto saxophonist, complications from heart surgery.
- Alex Naumik, 64, Lithuanian-born Norwegian artist, songwriter and record producer.
- Michael J. Noonan, 78, Irish politician, TD for Limerick West (1969–1977); Minister for Defence (1987–1989).
- Dick O'Neal, 78, American basketball player (Texas Christian University).
- Marvin Rainwater, 88, American country and rockabilly singer ("Whole Lotta Woman"), heart failure.
- Eiji Toyoda, 100, Japanese industrialist (Toyota Motor Company), heart failure.
- Allan Walsh, 73, Australian politician, member of the New South Wales Legislative Assembly for Maitland (1981–1991).
- Rein Welschen, 72, Dutch politician, Mayor of Eindhoven (1992–2003).

=== 18 ===
- Torleiv Anda, 92, Norwegian diplomat and politician.
- Veliyam Bharghavan, 85, Indian politician.
- Lindsay Cooper, 62, British rock and jazz bassoonist and oboist (Henry Cow, Comus, Feminist Improvising Group), multiple sclerosis.
- Rafael Corkidi, 83, Mexican cinematographer.
- Joy Covey, 50, American business executive (Amazon.com), bicycle collision.
- Johannes van Dam, 66, Dutch food journalist.
- Stanislas Dombeck, 81, French footballer (Tours, Stade Français, Rennes, Amiens) and coach (Tours).
- Allan Ellis, 62, American football player (Chicago Bears, San Diego Chargers), heart attack.
- Pavlos Fyssas, 34, Greek anti-fascist rapper, stabbed.
- Dame Monica Gallagher, 90, Australian community worker and church activist.
- Marta Heflin, 68, American actress (Come Back to the Five and Dime, Jimmy Dean, Jimmy Dean, A Perfect Couple).
- Johnny Laboriel, 71, Mexican rock 'n' roll singer, prostate cancer.
- Arthur Lamothe, 84, French-born Canadian film director and producer.
- Dominique Loiseau, 64, French watchmaker.
- Donald Low, 68, Canadian microbiologist, key figure in Toronto SARS outbreak, brain cancer.
- Stephen Malawista, 79, American medical researcher, discovered Lyme disease.
- Ken Norton, 70, American former WBC heavyweight champion boxer and actor (Mandingo, Drum), heart failure.
- Lisa Otto, 93, German operatic soprano.
- Carlos Alberto Raffo, 87, Argentine-born Ecuadorian footballer (Emelec).
- Marcel Reich-Ranicki, 93, German literary critic.
- Luigi Rapini, 89, Italian Olympic basketball player.
- Richard C. Sarafian, 83, American film and television director (I Spy, Vanishing Point, 77 Sunset Strip), complications from pneumonia.

=== 19 ===
- Amidou, 78, Moroccan actor (Ronin, Spy Game, Rules of Engagement).
- Robert Barnard, 76, English crime writer and critic.
- Sven Josef Cyvin, 82, Norwegian chemist.
- Øystein Fischer, 71, Norwegian physicist.
- Brian Furniss, 78, English cricketer (Derbyshire).
- Mary Jean Harrold, 66, American computer scientist, cancer.
- Patrick Kay, 92, British Royal Marines major general.
- Gerrie Mühren, 67, Dutch footballer (Ajax, national team), European Cup winner (1971, 1972, 1973), complications from myelodysplastic syndrome.
- John Reger, 82, American football player (Pittsburgh Steelers, Washington Redskins).
- Viktor Tišler, 71, Slovenian Olympic ice hockey player.
- William Ungar, 100, Polish-born American Holocaust survivor and memoirist.
- John D. Vanderhoof, 91, American politician, Governor of Colorado (1973–1975).
- Bob Wallace, 75, New Zealand test driver and automotive engineer.
- Hiroshi Yamauchi, 85, Japanese businessman, President of Nintendo (1949–2002, 2002–2005), owner of Seattle Mariners, complications from pneumonia.
- Saye Zerbo, 81, Burkinabé politician, President of Upper Volta (1980–1982).

=== 20 ===
- Ercan Aktuna, 73, Turkish footballer (Fenerbahçe).
- D. J. R. Bruckner, 79, American journalist.
- George Bryan, 92, British businessman, founder of Drayton Manor Theme Park.
- Carolyn Cassady, 90, American beat writer.
- Jim Charlton, 102, Canadian coin dealer and numismatic publisher.
- Robert W. Ford, 90, British diplomat and radio operator.
- Robert J. Odegard, 92, American businessman and politician.
- Robert L. Reymond, 80, American Christian theologian.
- Ron Richards, 85, Australian football player (Collingwood).
- Angelo Savoldi, 99, American professional wrestler and promoter.
- Ernest Schultz, 82, French soccer player.
- James B. Vaught, 86, American army lieutenant general, drowned.
- Gilles Verlant, 56, Belgian journalist and music critic.

=== 21 ===
- Ruhila Adatia-Sood, 31, Kenyan radio presenter, shot.
- Kofi Awoonor, 78, Ghanaian poet and diplomat, shot.
- Michel Brault, 85, Canadian film director.
- Justo Galaviz, 59, Venezuelan Olympic cyclist.
- Harl H. Haas Jr., 80, American politician and jurist.
- Tarō Ishida, 69, Japanese voice actor (Astro Boy, Akira), myocardial infarction.
- Walt Linden, 89, American baseball player (Boston Braves).
- Chester Moody, 78, American Negro league baseball player.
- Francis Peay, 69, American football player (New York Giants, Green Bay Packers, Kansas City Chiefs) and coach (Northwestern University).
- Joshua Ribera, 18, British rapper, stabbed.
- Peter Solan, 84, Slovak film director.
- René Solís, 88, Cuban baseball player.
- Roman Vlad, 93, Romanian-born Italian composer, pianist and musicologist.
- Walter Wallmann, 80, German politician.
- Ko Wierenga, 80, Dutch politician, Mayor of Enschede (1977–1994).

=== 22 ===
- Gary Brandner, 80, American horror author (The Howling), esophageal cancer.
- Jane Connell, 87, American stage, musical theatre and television actress (Mame).
- Kenneth Eager, 84, British sculptor.
- Manuel González, 84, Spanish footballer.
- David H. Hubel, 87, Canadian-born American neurologist, laureate of the Nobel Prize in Physiology or Medicine (1981).
- Álvaro Mutis, 90, Colombian poet, novelist and essayist.
- John E. Naus, 89, American Jesuit priest.
- Dave Nichol, 73, Canadian product marketeer (Loblaw).
- Phyllis Pond, 82, American politician, member of the Indiana House of Representatives (since 1978).
- Howard Riopelle, 91, Canadian ice hockey player (Montreal Canadiens).
- Mohan Singh, 68, Indian politician, member of the Lok Sabha for Deoria (1991–1996; 1998–1999; 2004–2009), cancer.
- Hans Erich Slany, 86, German industrial designer, founded TEAMS Design.
- Luciano Vincenzoni, 87, Italian screenwriter (For a Few Dollars More, The Good, the Bad and the Ugly), lung cancer.

=== 23 ===
- Abdel Hamid al-Sarraj, 87–88, Syrian army officer and politician, Chairman of the Executive Council of the Northern Region of the United Arab Republic (1960–1961).
- Severiano Álvarez, 80, Spanish writer.
- Eivinn Berg, 82, Norwegian ambassador and politician, traffic collision.
- Acharya Buddharakkhita, 91, Indian Buddhist monk, founded the Maha Bodhi Society.
- Denys Chamay, 71, Swiss Olympic fencer.
- Gil Dozier, 79, American politician and convicted extortionist, Louisiana Commissioner of Agriculture and Forestry (1976–1980).
- Oscar Espinosa Chepe, 72, Cuban economist, liver disease.
- Harry Goodwin, 89, British photographer.
- Anthony Hawkins, 80, Australian actor (Special Squad).
- John Hipwell, 65, Australian rugby union player and national team captain.
- Rex Hobcroft, 88, Australian pianist, conductor, composer and music administrator.
- Hannu Kankkonen, 79, Finnish footballer.
- Annette Kerr, 93, British actress.
- Christopher Koch, 81, Australian novelist (The Year of Living Dangerously), cancer.
- Rupert Kratzer, 68, German Olympic cyclist.
- Paul Kuhn, 85, German musician.
- Trevor Lummis, 83, British social historian.
- Gia Maione, 72, American jazz singer.
- Vlatko Marković, 76, Croatian footballer (NK Dinamo Zagreb, Wiener Sport-Club), President of the Croatian Football Federation (1999, 2005, 2006–2012), Alzheimer's disease.
- Ruth Patrick, 105, American ecology pioneer.
- Hugo Raes, 84, Belgian writer and poet.
- Geo Saizescu, 80, Romanian film director, screenwriter and actor.
- Kirsten Sørlie, 86, Norwegian actress and stage director.
- Robert C. Stebbins, 98, American herpetologist and illustrator.
- Stanisław Szozda, 62, Polish Olympic silver-medalist cyclist (1972, 1976).
- Yu Guangyuan, 98, Chinese economist.

=== 24 ===
- Clive Akerman, 73, English philatelist.
- Sverre Bruland, 90, Norwegian conductor.
- Austin Cooper, 84, Canadian criminal lawyer.
- Bernard Corboz, 65, Swiss judge, Vice-President of the Federal Supreme Court (2005–2006).
- Paul Dietzel, 89, American football player and coach.
- Louis Euzet, 90, French parasitologist.
- Pietro Farina, 71, Italian Roman Catholic prelate, Bishop of Alife-Caiazzo (1999–2009) and Caserta (since 2009).
- Margaret Feilman, 92, Australian town planner and architect.
- Boris Karvasarsky, 82, Ukrainian-born Russian psychiatrist.
- Anthony Lawrence, 101, British journalist.
- Paddy McFlynn, 96, Irish sports administrator.
- Sagadat Nurmagambetov, 89, Kazakh politician and Soviet army general, Minister of Defense (1992–1995).
- Paul Oliver, 29, American football player (San Diego Chargers), suicide by gunshot.
- Viktor Zinger, 71, Russian Olympic ice hockey champion (1968), world champion (1965–1969).
- Ian O. Paquit, 21, Philippine Army enlisted soldier, died from wounds from Zamboanga City crisis

=== 25 ===
- Aube, 64, Japanese musician.
- Miron Babiak, 81, Polish Antarctic research ship captain.
- Elisabeth Borchers, 87, German writer and poet.
- Adalbert Brunke, 101, German Evangelical-Lutheran prelate, Bishop of Kap-Orange (1972–1978), pastor to Nelson Mandela.
- Choi In-ho, 67, South Korean writer, salivary gland cancer.
- Dayjur, 26, American-bred, British-trained Thoroughbred racehorse, euthanized.
- Ron Fenton, 72, English football player and coach (Nottingham Forest).
- Timothy Joseph Lyne, 94, American Roman Catholic prelate, Auxiliary Bishop of Chicago (1983–1995).
- José Montoya, 81, American poet, artist and educator, co-founder of Royal Chicano Air Force, lymphoma.
- Billy Mure, 97, American guitarist.
- Vladimir Oidupaa, 64, Russian Tuvan musician.
- Hans-Joachim Rotzsch, 84, German choral conductor.
- Bill Stewart, 85, American baseball player.
- Pablo Verani, 75, Italian-born Argentinian politician, Senator (since 2007).
- Bennet Wong, 83, Canadian psychiatrist.
- George N. Zenovich, 91, American politician and judge, member of the California State Senate (1971–1979).

=== 26 ===
- Azizan Abdul Razak, 68, Malaysian politician, Menteri Besar of Kedah (2008–2013), heart attack.
- Denis Brodeur, 82, Canadian Olympic bronze-medalist ice hockey player (1956) and photographer.
- Don Donovan, 83, Irish football player and manager (Grimsby Town, Everton, Boston United).
- Seánie Duggan, 90, Irish hurler (Galway).
- Ellis Evans, 83, Welsh Celtic scholar.
- Ronald Gerritse, 61, Dutch civil servant.
- Anup Ghatak, 72, Indian cricketer.
- Arnstein Johansen, 88, Norwegian accordionist.
- Harold E. Kleinert, 91, American surgeon.
- Evelyn G. Lowery, 88, American civil rights activist (Selma to Montgomery marches), complications from a stroke.
- Robert Martensen, 66, American physician, historian and author.
- Mustapha Masmoudi, 75-76, Tunisian politician and diplomat.
- Mario Montez, 78, American drag artist and actor.
- Takafusa Nakamura, 87, Japanese economist, hepatitis.
- Sos Sargsyan, 83, Armenian actor.
- Helge Solvang, 100, Norwegian war sailor.

=== 27 ===
- George Bignotti, 97, American motorsport mechanic and team owner.
- Gates Brown, 74, American baseball player (Detroit Tigers).
- John Calvert, 102, American magician.
- Oscar Castro-Neves, 73, Brazilian bossa nova musician.
- Berty Premalal Dissanayake, 59, Sri Lankan politician, Chief Minister of the North Central Province (1999–2012).
- Mauricio González-Gordon y Díez, 89, Spanish conservationist and sherry trader.
- Ernst Gutting, 94, German Roman Catholic prelate, Auxiliary Bishop of Speyer (1971–1994).
- Elvin R. Heiberg III, 81, American army general, Chief of Engineers (1984–1988).
- Jock Kane, 92, British intelligence officer.
- Ferenc Kárpáti, 86, Hungarian military officer and politician, Minister of Defence (1985–1990).
- Birger Kivelä, 92, Finnish Olympic diver (1952).
- Tuncel Kurtiz, 77, Turkish actor, fall.
- A. C. Lyles, 95, American producer (Deadwood, Rawhide).
- Silvano Montevecchi, 75, Italian Roman Catholic prelate, Bishop of Ascoli Piceno (since 1997).
- Albert Naughton, 84, English rugby league player (Widnes, Warrington).
- Jay Robinson, 83, American actor (Dracula, Days of Our Lives, The Robe).
- Aluthwewa Soratha Thera, 70, Sri Lankan monk.

=== 28 ===
- Carlo Castellaneta, 83, Italian author and journalist, pneumonia.
- James Emanuel, 92, American poet and academic.
- Faz Fazakas, 95, American puppeteer, engineer, and special effects designer.
- Jonathan Fellows-Smith, 81, South African cricketer.
- Farouk Janeman, 60, Fijian football player and manager (Ba).
- T. M. Kamble, 67, Indian politician, leader of Republican Party of India (Democratic), heart attack.
- Patricia Kenner, 84, American politician and registered nurse.
- Sandro Mariátegui Chiappe, 91, Peruvian politician, Prime Minister (1984), Senator (1980–1992), heart failure.
- Odlanier Mena, 87, Chilean army general and intelligence chief, suicide by gunshot.
- Turgut Özakman, 83, Turkish author.
- Anatoli Parov, 57, Russian footballer.
- Igor Romishevsky, 73, Russian Olympic ice hockey champion (1968, 1972), world champion (1968–1971).
- Ted Rusoff, 74, Canadian-born Italian actor (The Passion of the Christ, The Last Temptation of Christ, The Nativity Story), injuries sustained in a traffic collision.
- Walter Schmidinger, 80, Austrian actor.
- Michael Sullivan, 96, English art historian.
- Remo Tomasi, 81, Italian Olympic speed skater.
- B. B. Watson, 60, American country music singer.
- George Amon Webster, 67, American Southern gospel singer, cancer.

=== 29 ===
- Harold Agnew, 92, American physicist, leukemia.
- Anton Benning, 95, German World War II Luftwaffe ace.
- Patricia Castell, 87, Argentinian actress, pneumonia.
- Pete Cenarrusa, 95, American politician, Secretary of State of Idaho (1967–2003), lung cancer.
- Carl Joachim Classen, 85, German classical scholar.
- S. N. Goenka, 89, Burmese-born Indian Vipassana teacher.
- Lawrence Goodwyn, 85, American writer and political theorist.
- L. C. Greenwood, 67, American football player (Pittsburgh Steelers), kidney failure.
- Marcella Hazan, 89, Italian-born American cookbook author.
- Yury Isakov, 63, Soviet Olympic athlete.
- Pete Kettela, 75, American football executive and coach (Edmonton Eskimos).
- Bob Kurland, 88, American basketball player (Oklahoma A&M Aggies), Olympic champion (1948, 1952).
- Robert Leeson, 85, English children's writer.
- Michael Maher, 77, Australian politician, MP for Lowe (1982–1987).
- Charles McKean, 67, Scottish architectural historian.
- Roy Peterson, 77, Canadian editorial cartoonist.
- Gene Petit, 63, American professional wrestler (WWF).
- Hugh de Wardener, 97, British medical doctor.
- Scott Workman, 47, American stuntman (Crank, Iron Man 2, End of Days), cancer.
- Toyoko Yamasaki, 88, Japanese writer, heart failure.

=== 30 ===
- Kazys Bobelis, 90, Lithuanian politician, MP for Marijampolė (1992–2006).
- John Flanagan, 71, Scottish footballer (Partick Thistle).
- David Gitari, 76, Kenyan primate and Archbishop of the Anglican Church of Kenya (1997–2002).
- Anthony Hinds, 91, British screenwriter and producer.
- Kinmont Hoitsma, 79, American Olympic fencer.
- John Hopkins, 86, British-born Australian conductor and music administrator.
- Ruth Maleczech, 74, American actress (Nick and Norah's Infinite Playlist, The Crucible), cancer.
- Evelyn M. Nowak, 100, American politician.
- Janet Powell, 71, Australian politician, Leader of the Australian Democrats (1990–1991), Senator for Victoria (1986–1993), pancreatic cancer.
- Ramblin' Tommy Scott, 96, American country and rockabilly musician, complications from traffic collision.
- Olive Stevenson, 82, British academic and social worker.
- James Street, 65, American football player (University of Texas), heart attack.
- Rangel Valchanov, 84, Bulgarian actor and film director, cancer.
- Zulema, 66, American R&B singer (Faith Hope and Charity).
