= Corboz =

Corboz is a surname. Notable people with the surname include:

- Bernard Corboz (1948–2013), Swiss judge
- Daphne Corboz (born 1993), French-American soccer player
- Mael Corboz (born 1994), American soccer player, brother of Daphne
- Michel Corboz (1934–2021), Swiss conductor
- Rachel Corboz, American soccer player
