= Guido van der Werve =

Dutch filmmaker and visual artist

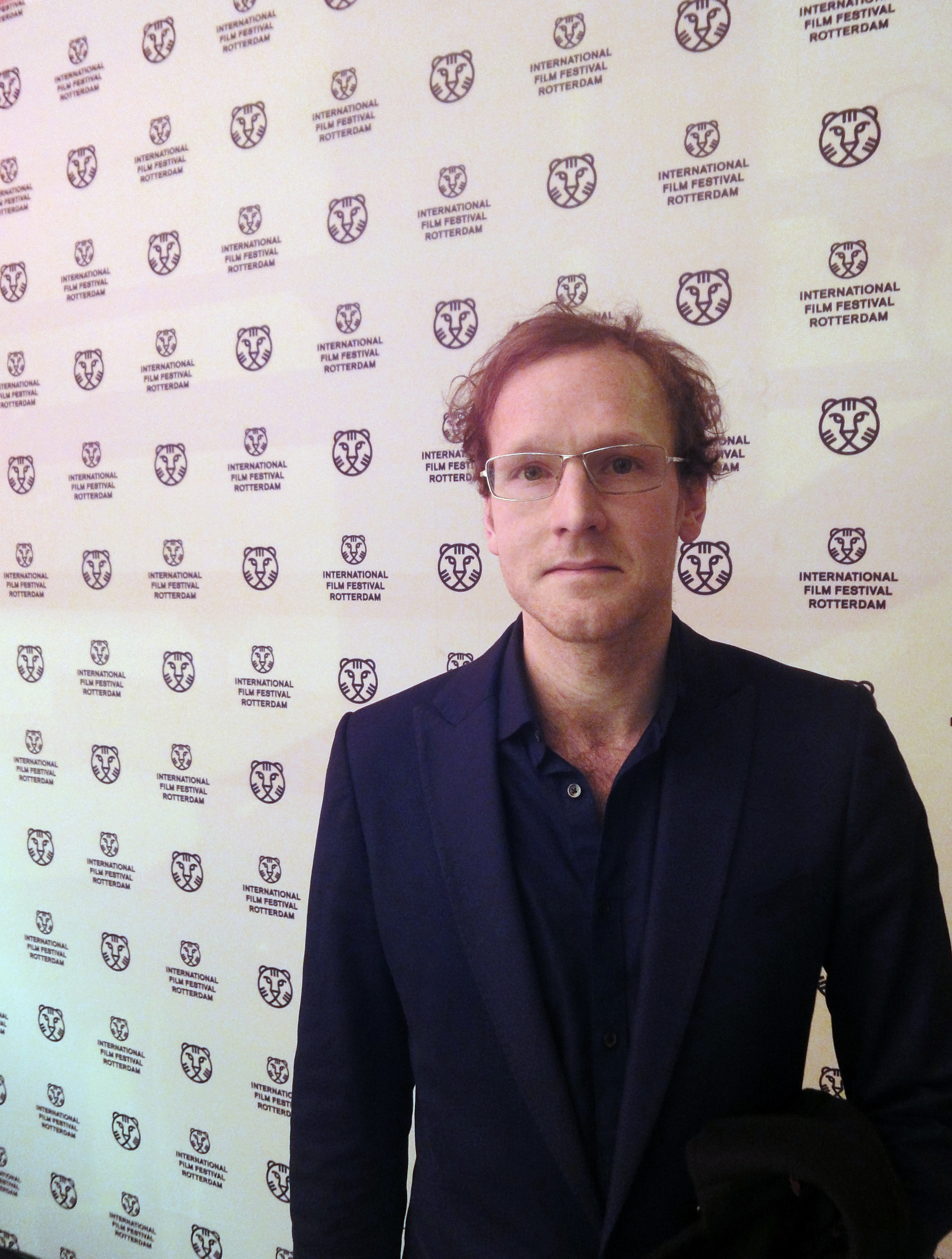
- Guido van der Werve, IFFR (2013)
- Born: 1977 (age 48–49); Papendrecht, Netherlands
- Occupations: Filmmaker, visual artist

Guido van der Werve (born 1977) is a Dutch filmmaker and visual artist.

== Personal details ==
Van der Werve was born in Papendrecht, the Netherlands and currently lives and works in Finland and Berlin. He pursued studies in industrial design, archaeology, music composition, and Russian language and literature at several universities in the Netherlands before beginning to create his first video documented performances at the Gerrit Rietveld Academy around 2000. Van der Werve initially started out doing performances but because he disliked the live aspect, he started to film them with simple video cameras. The registrations became gradually more cinematic and professional over the years. Having a background in music Van der Werve tries to create visual art, which communicates as direct as music. In 2006 Van der Werve did a residency at the Rijksakademie van Beeldende Kunsten in Amsterdam. In 2008 he moved to New York. From 2010 on Van der Werve has been living in the Finnish countryside and Berlin. Van der Werve is an avid runner and triathlete.

In 2016 he had a serious accident. Realizing an inferiority complex saved his life, he made an auto fiction feature film out of it.

== Works ==
Van der Werve has created a variety of works, including a series of film and videos and a musical composition titled by number in chronological order from two to seventeen. Number ten and number fifteen being monographs each about the five years of works prior to the book.

Works include:

- Nummer twee, Just because I'm standing here doesn't mean I want to.

03'08", 35mm, Papendrecht NL, 2003

- Nummer drie, Take step fall

10'38", 35mm, Amsterdam NL, 2004

- Nummer vier, I don't want to get involved in this. I don't want to be part of this. Talk me out of it.

11'49", 35mm, Zandvoort, Siitama & Enschede NL 2005

- Nummer zes, Steinway grand piano, Wake me up to go to sleep, and all the colors of the rainbow.

17'09", 35mm, Amsterdam NL, 2006

- Nummer zeven, The clouds are more beautiful from above

8'48", HD video, Amsterdam NL, 2006

- Nummer acht, everything is going to be alright

10'10", 16 mm film to HD, Golf of Bothnia FI, 2007

- Nummer negen, The day I didn't turn with the world

8'40", time-lapse photography to HD video, Geographic Northpole, 2007

- Nummer twaalf, variations on a theme

40'00", 4k video. Marshall Chess Club, Mt St Helens & San Andreas Fault USA, 2009

- Nummer dertien, effugio c, you're always only half a day away

12 hours, HD video, Hassi Finland, 2011

- Nummer veertien, home

54'00", 4k video, Poland, Holland, Germany, France, Egypt, India and Greece, 2012

- Nummer zestien, The present moment

Three-channel HD video installation with player piano, Amsterdam, 2016

- Nummer zeventien killing time - attempt one: from the deepest ocean to the highest mountain

2015

- Nummer achttien, the breath of life

2023

Besides his films, Guido van der Werve did several live performances of the music of his films accompanied by an orchestra.

In 2011, Van der Werve performed at the grand opening program for the St. Louis location of the World Chess Hall of Fame. He performed his piece, "Number Twelve : Chess Piano Concert in Three Movements" which combined the mechanics of a piano with the layout of a traditional chess board.

In 2008 he created "Nummer acht :, everything is going to be alright" where he is seen walking 15 metres (49 ft) in front of an icebreaker.

For his film "Number Nine : the day I didn't turn with the world", he went to the geographical North Pole where he turned with the sun for 24 hours, thus not turning with the world for one day. This marked the start of a series of endurance based works:

In 2009 he started the annual Running for Rachmaninoff run, running from his gallery, Luhring Augustine, to the grave of composer Sergei Rachmaninoff in Valhalla in Upstate NY, a 55 km run. The first year only Guido completed the run, in 2011 he finished with 2 people and in 2012 three persons managed to complete the run. Participants have to carry with them a booklet of Chamomile flowers to be placed on the grave. The 2015-2016 Running for Rachmanninoff run was run by the artist alone back to back on December 31 of 2015 and January 1 of 2016

A documentation of this run (on slides) is the first part of "Nummer dertien", the first performance through which he started incorporating sports in his art. Other parts of "Nummer dertien" feature Van der Werve in a 12-hour video work in which the artist is running around his house in Finland for 12 hours and climbing to the summit of Aconcagua and "Nummer veertien" where he completed a 1600 km triathlon (7x the ironman distance) from Warshaw to Paris. Music often plays a key role in van der Werve's work, being trained as a classical musician he seeks for a similar directness to his art as music has.

Works by Guido van der Werve are a.o. in the collections of The Museum of Modern Art in New York, Stedelijk Museum in Amsterdam, the Netherlands, Hirshhorn Museum, Washington D.C., Museum Boijmans Van Beuningen, Rotterdam, The Netherlands and Museum Catharijne Convent, Utrecht, The Netherlands.

== Reviews and articles ==
On Nummer Veertien: Tineke Reijnders in Ons Erfdeel

Jerry Saltz in New York magazine

Christopher Knight in the Los Angeles Times

Roberta Smith in the New York Times

On Nummer acht and Nummer negen Jessica Dawson in the Washington Post

Raul Martinez in Art in America

== Awards and prizes ==
2013

- Gouden Kalf for best short film at the Dutch Film Festival in Utrecht, NL for Nummer veertien, home
- Nominated for the Tiger Award for short films at the International Film Festival Rotterdam for Nummer veertien, home

2012

- Charlotte Köhlerprijs

2011

- Prix de Rome, nomination, SMART Project Space, Amsterdam, NL

2010

- Prix International d’Art Contemporain. Foundation PrincePierre de Monaco, MC
- Future Generation Art Prize. nomination, PinchukArtCentre, UA
- Number one artist at Elsevier top 100 Dutch Artists

2009

- Foundation for Contemporary Arts, Grants to Artists Award, NY, USA

2008

- Nominated for; Gouden Kalf for Best Short Film, Dutch Film Festival Utrecht, NL

2007

- Volkskrant Beeldende Kunst Prijs, NL
- Shortlisted for the Future Generation Art Price, Pinchuk Foundation Kyiv, Ukraine
- Peter Paul Peterich fonds, Prins Bernhard Cultuurfonds. NL

2006

- Best Experimental Film, Kerry Film Festival. IE

2005

- Nominated for; Prix de Rome, NL

2004

- Nominated for; de NPS Prijs voor de Korte Film, NL
- Diamond Award, Zebra film poetry award festival, Berlin, DE

2003

- One minute award (tommy), Audience choice of best of five years one minutes, NL
- René Coelho award, the Netherlands Media Art Institute, Montevideo/TBA, Amsterdam, NL

== Galleries ==
Guido van der Werve is represented by:

- Monitor gallery, Rome
- Grimm gallery, Amsterdam
- Luhring Augustine, New York City
- Marc Foxx is Closed
