= SMART Project Space =

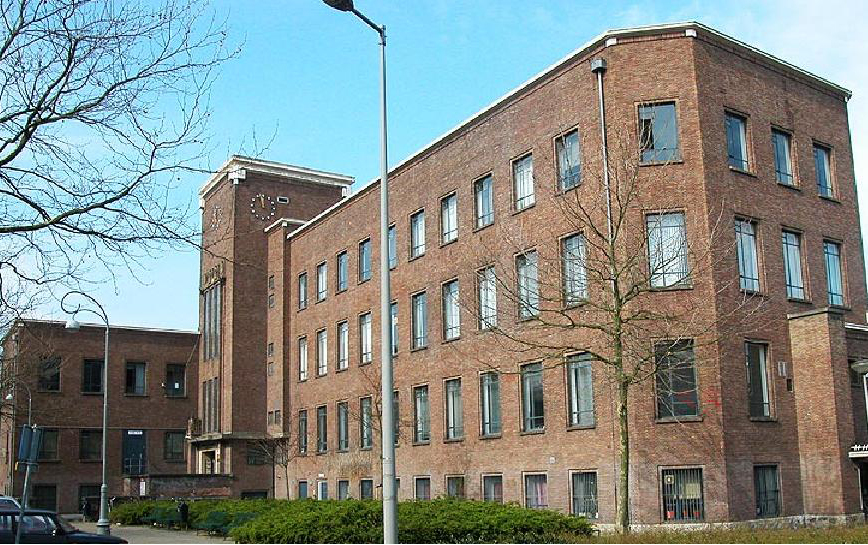
SMART Project Space, Arie Biemondstraat 111, Amsterdam, the Netherlands

SMART Project Space (SPS or SMART) was a publicly funded foundation for Contemporary Art founded in 1994 by the innovative cultural mediator Thomas Peutz. SPS closed its innovative exhibition programme in 2013, but remains a creative industries incubator, offering studio space to artists currently under the remit of SMART Estate Incorporation. Located in the old west of Amsterdam, SMART Project Space was a pioneering institution. It put the artist at the core of its programmes and sought stimulating and new relationships between the artist and the wider community. SMART commissioned, produced, and showcased some 70 contemporary visual art exhibitions, hosted hundreds of films, music and performance events, drawing together a wide range of creative approaches across disciplines.

SMART developed different platforms of artistic production and creative research - visual arts, to music and film, design and architecture and social art practice. It was an artistic community embedded in its neighbourhood, a laboratory for creative research and activity, and a research centre alternative to the existing institutional structures.

SMART was publicly funded by the Mondriaan Foundation, City of Amsterdam; Bureau Broedplaatsen, Stichting DOEN, The Netherlands Film Fund, Prins Bernhard Cultuurfonds, VSBfonds, Amsterdam Fund for the Arts, Culture Ireland.

== History ==
SMART Project Space, Centre for Contemporary Art was founded as an alternative art space in 1994 by Thomas Peutz. It was first located in the centre of the city on the Kloveniersburgwal, number 7. SMART moved further along the street in 1997 to the so-called Bushuis at number 48 (now a library of the University of Amsterdam) where it began to organise events alongside its exhibition activities. In 2000 SMART relocated to the extensive disused laboratory building of the former Jan Swammerdam Institute of the University on the 1e Constantijn Huygensstraat. The experimental arts programme developed into a mix of exhibition, cinema, music and performance and was a creative hive of activity. There were 44 studios on the upper two floors rented to artists, musicians, tech start ups, designers and architects, an exhibition space, a cinema and the hip media cafe/restaurant De Ruimte (the space) owned by the Hip Hop cafe De Duivel. After opening its doors it became a hub for artists, filmmakers, designers, TV presenters and anyone who wanted in on the scene. SMART was the first exhibition venue to open its doors 7 days per week until late. It grew to become one of the hippest cultural venues in the city and was the heart of the creative industries in the early 2000s. After a two-year struggle with the Local city Council to keep the building, Thomas Peutz developed one of the first major capital development projects. In 2004 SMART relocated one final time to the Pathological Anatomical Laboratory from the 1930s (PAL) in the Old West neighborhood of Amsterdam which is known for its diverse and eclectic ethnic and artistic community. Thomas Peutz established SMART Estate Incorporation, bringing together investors to make the purchase of the building possible. The re-development was fully finished in 2008. There are four levels separated according to function. Artist studios and administrative office space are on the top floor. 600 m^{2} of exhibition space, including a main space and a smaller project space are on the first floor. An auditorium, two cinemas and a café/restaurant, LAB111, which is accessed through the main lobby. Lab111 was awarded a "9+" score by "notoriously finicky food critic Johannes van Dam."

== Exhibitions ==
The curatorial approach aims to keep the exhibition structure as flexible as possible with four core Statement exhibitions per year. Simultaneously, solo presentations that reinforce the annual programme are exhibited. Often, artists are granted total freedom to realize their projects. Since its founding in 1994, SMART has organized and produced over 70 exhibitions featuring national and international artists. Some examples of past exhibitions are: Hohere wesen befahlen: anders malen! (2001),Endure (2002),Hit & Run: Interventions in the City of Istanbul (2004), ADAM 30: international art projects through the city of Amsterdam (2005), Gavin Wades project Kiosk 7 (2008), Coalesce: Happenstance (2009), Modernity and Aesthetics of the New Black Atlantic (2010), Smooth Structures (2010), Hadley+Maxwell (2010)Chto Delat?: what is to be done between tragedy and farce (2011).

== Studios ==
SMART provides 12 studios for national and international artists as a space for experimentation, contemplation and production. Ten are reserved for Dutch residents and the remainder are awarded to the International Studio Programme, which provides foreign artists with an opportunity to live and work in Amsterdam for short periods of time, usually between 3–6 months. Additionally, two guest apartments are available to foreign curators and art critics travelling to Amsterdam for research purposes.

== Cinema ==
SMART Cinema presents a mix of Art House and Experimental Film. SMART Cinema´s programming focuses on a varied selection of films and video productions chosen for their stylistic originality and for the topics they address. Films and videos shown include recent art house feature films, independent documentaries, video art, old classics, modern countercultural flicks, and milestone avant-garde productions. It works with all Dutch distributors of art house, animation and independent content and with a growing number of international programme partners, highlighting productions that are released nationally. SMART Cinema is a podium for films that have not been acquired by Dutch distributors and has worked in association with The Rotterdam Film Festival, Goethe Institute, Hip Hop Amsterdam Film Festival, and The Film Krant. Recent SMART Cinema programs have featured films by critic Jacques Rancière.
