= Ronald Bandell =

Dutch civil servant and politician (1946–2015)

Ronald Johan Gottlieb Bandell (24 August 1946 – 16 November 2015) was a Dutch civil servant and politician of the Political Party of Radicals (PPR) and later the Labour Party (PvdA).

Bandell was born in Gouda. He was mayor of Moordrecht (1977–1987), Krimpen aan de Lek (1982–1985, acting), Papendrecht (1987–1995), Alkmaar (1995–2000), and Dordrecht (2000–2010).

In 2014 he became seriously ill and died at the age of 69 in Rotterdam in 2015. He is survived by his wife, children & spouses, and grandchildren.
