= Papendrecht =

- Municipality
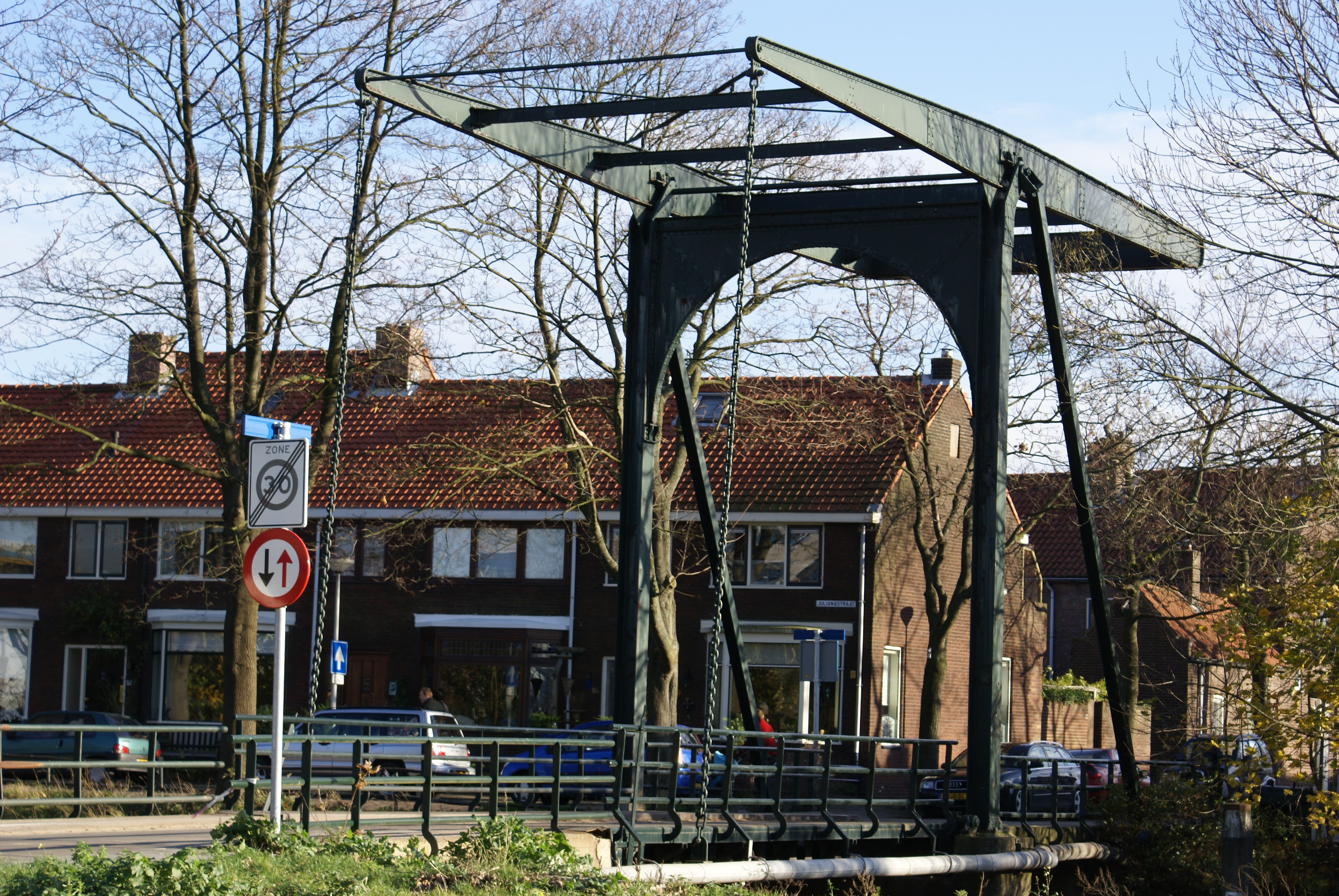
- Drawbridge in Papendrecht

- Flag Coat of arms

- Location in South Holland
- Coordinates: 51°50′N 4°41′E
- Country: Netherlands
- Province: South Holland

Government
  - Body: Municipal council
  - Mayor: Margreet van Driel (No party)

Area
  - Total: 10.79 km^{2} (4.17 sq mi)
  - Land: 9.41 km^{2} (3.63 sq mi)
  - Water: 1.38 km^{2} (0.53 sq mi)
- Elevation: −1 m (−3.3 ft)

Population (January 2021)
  - Total: 32,171
  - Density: 3,419/km^{2} (8,860/sq mi)
- Demonym: Papendrechter
- Time zone: UTC+1 (CET)
  - Summer (DST): UTC+2 (CEST)
- Postcode: 3350–3356
- Area code: 078
- Website: www.papendrecht.nl
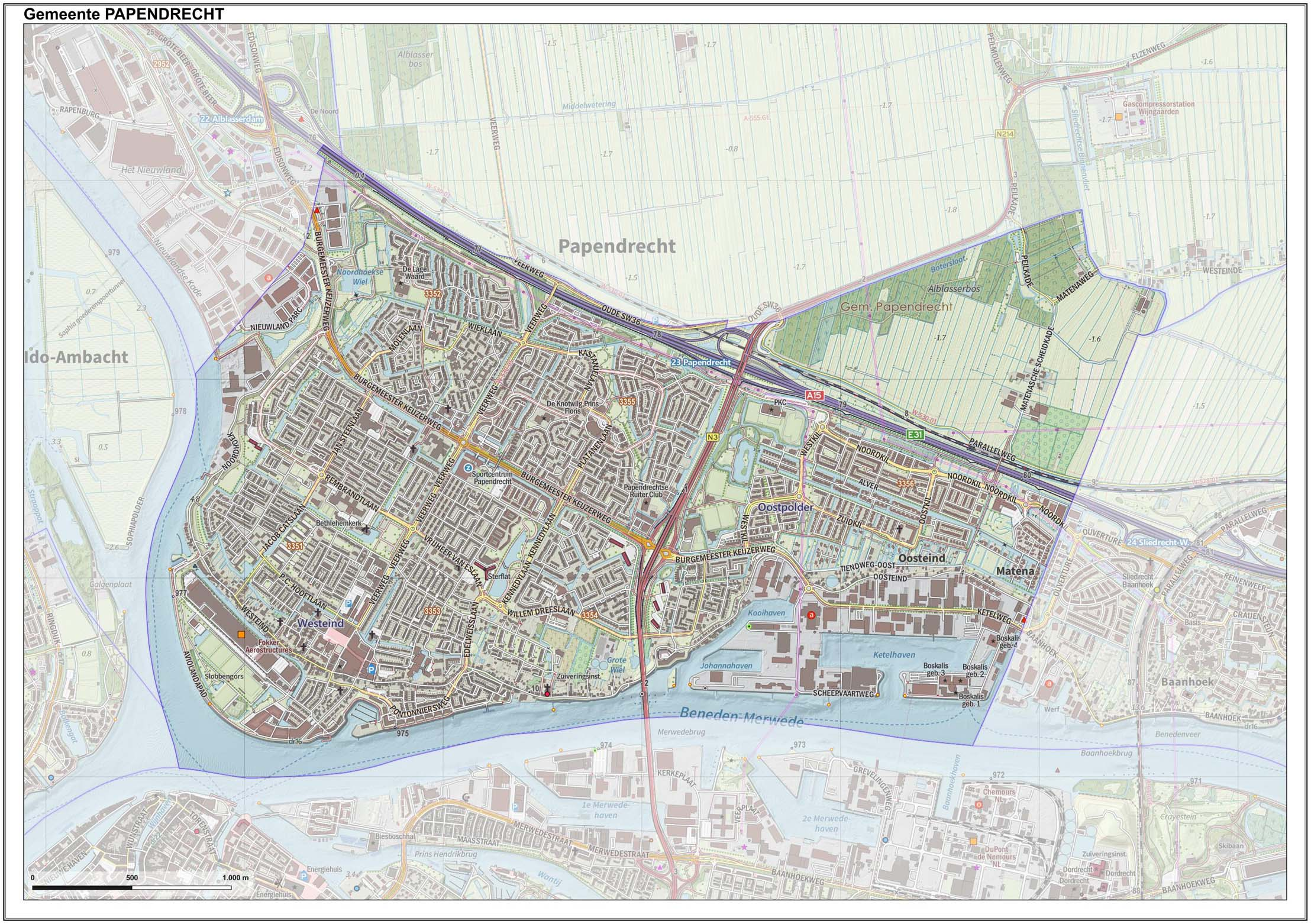
- Map of municipality of Papendrecht, June 2015

Papendrecht (Dutch pronunciation: [ˈpaːpə(n)drɛxt]) is a town and municipality in the western Netherlands, in the province of South Holland, at the crossing of the River Beneden Merwede and the Noord River. The municipality had a population of 32,171 in 2021 and covers an area of 10.79 km^{2} (4.17 sq mi) of which 1.38 km^{2} (0.53 sq mi) is water.

Although Papendrecht is first mentioned in documents dating back to 1105, it remained a small settlement until the 1950s. In the 1960s its development accelerated and almost its entire area is now urbanized.

== Economy ==
The largest company headquartered in Papendrecht is Royal Boskalis.

The aerospace company Fokker Technologies is also headquartered in Papendrecht.

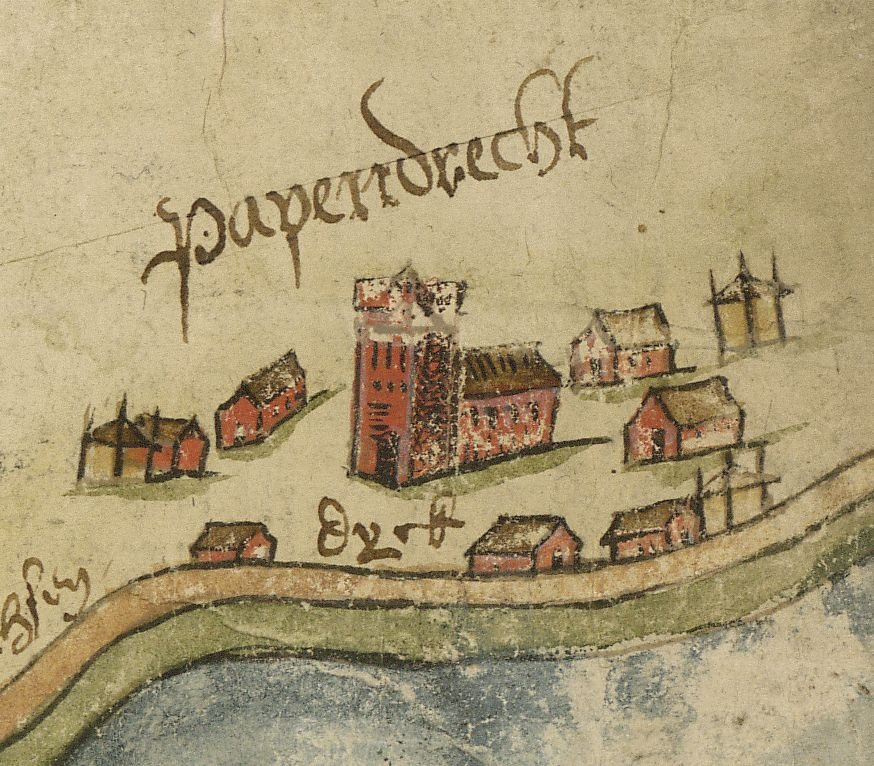
Detail of Papendrecht from 1615.

== Transportation ==
Papendrecht has three water taxi stops, one at the Beneden Merwede River, one at the Noord River, and one near Kooihaven. Bus services are provided by Arriva. Bus service Qliner (part of Arriva) has a stop in Papendrecht for its bus service from Dordrecht to Utrecht and back.

== Notable people ==
- Anton Willem Nieuwenhuis (1864–1953) a Dutch explorer and physician, studied the Dayak people
- Carel Visser (1928–2015) a Dutch abstract-minimalist, constructivist sculptor
- Jan Klijnjan (1945–2022) a Dutch former international footballer with over 300 club caps
- Ronald Bandell (1946–2015) a Dutch civil servant and politician, Mayor of Papendrecht 1987–1995
- Yolanda Hadid (born 1964) a Dutch-American TV personality and former model
- Guido van der Werve (born 1977) a Dutch filmmaker and visual artist
- Liza van der Most (born 1993) a Dutch footballer, who has played 137 games for AFC Ajax women
- Julia Bergshoeff (born 1997) a Dutch fashion model
- Naomi Visser (born 2001) a Dutch gymnast

== Gallery ==
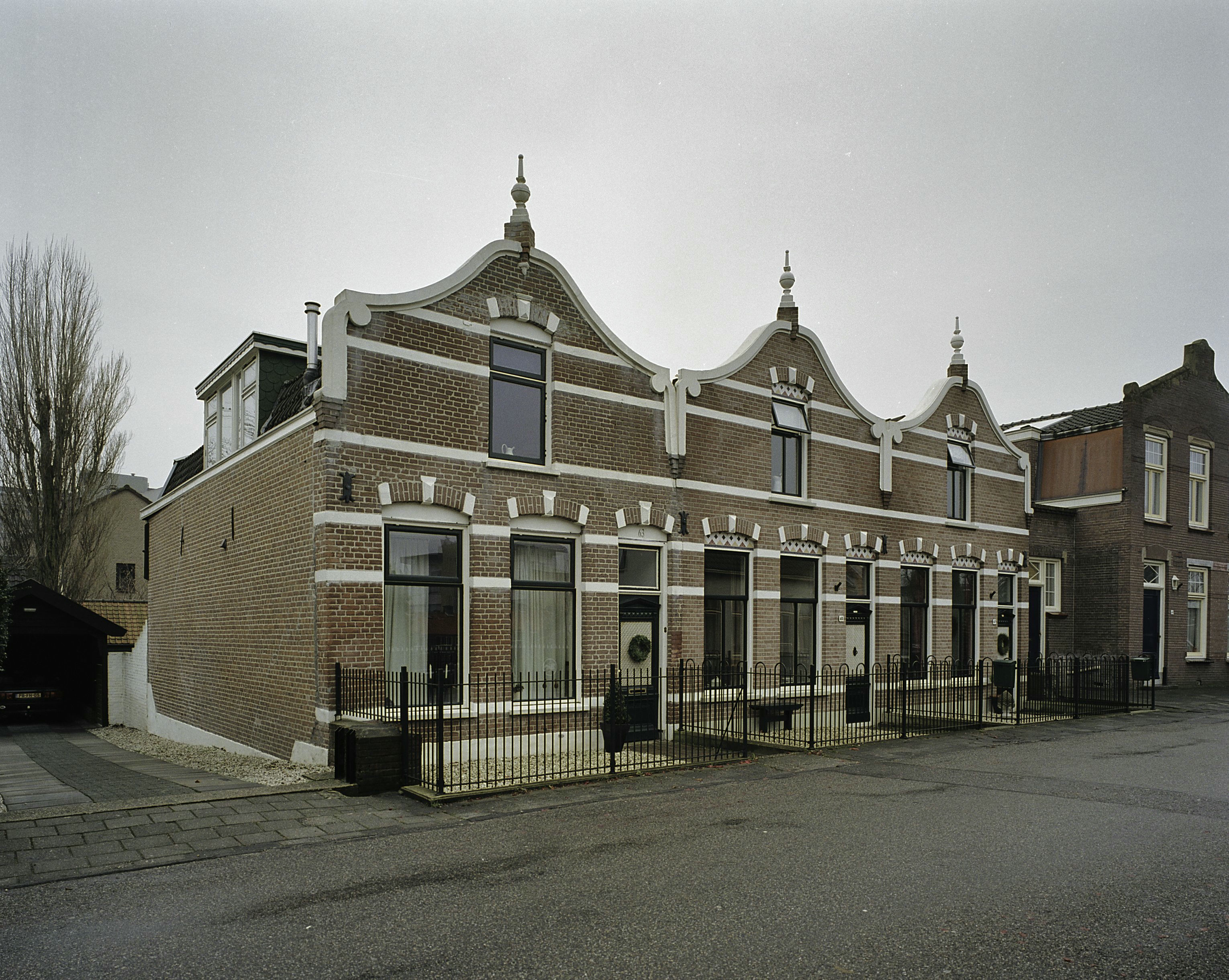
Papendrecht, house fronts

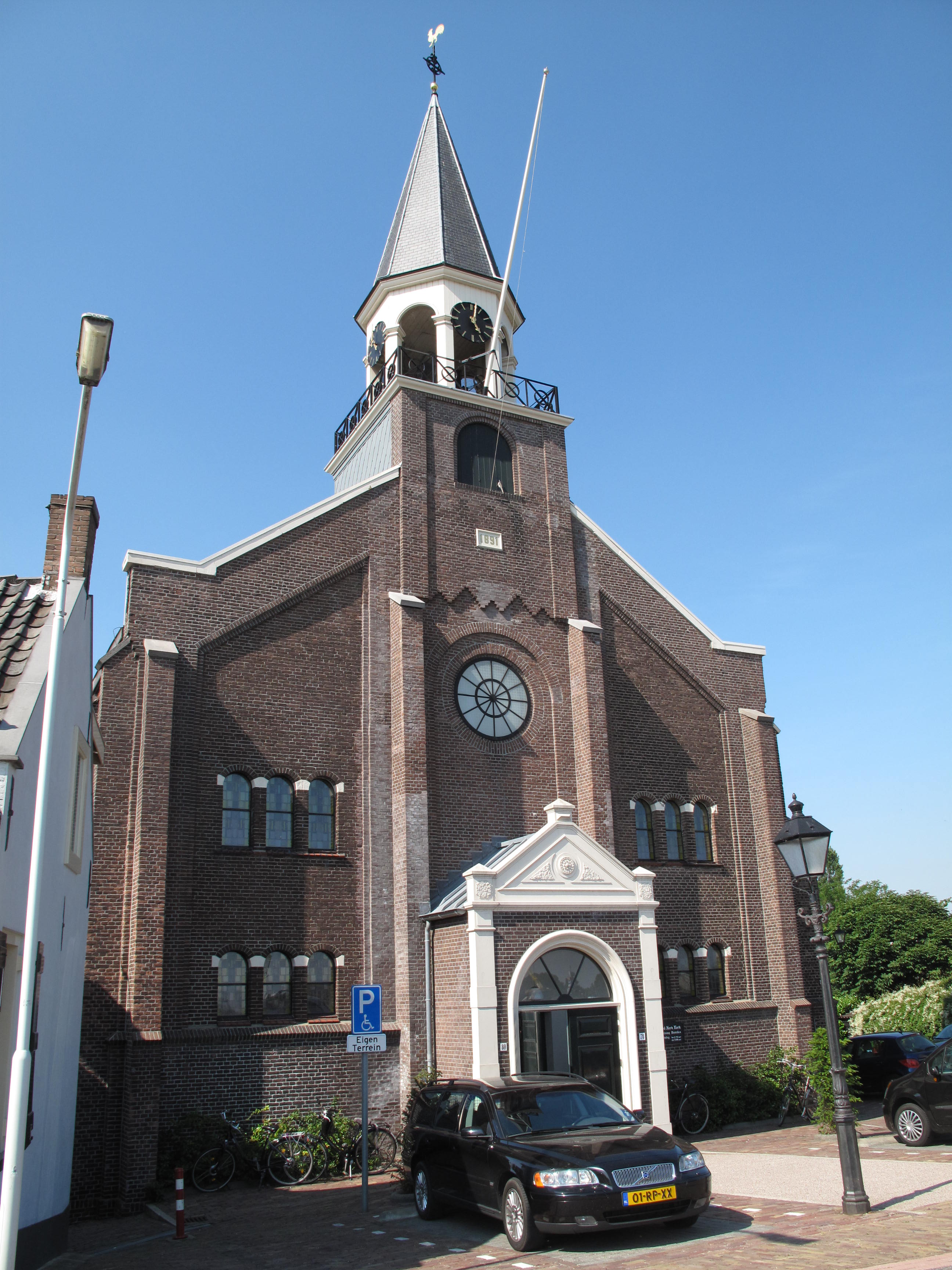
Papendrecht, church

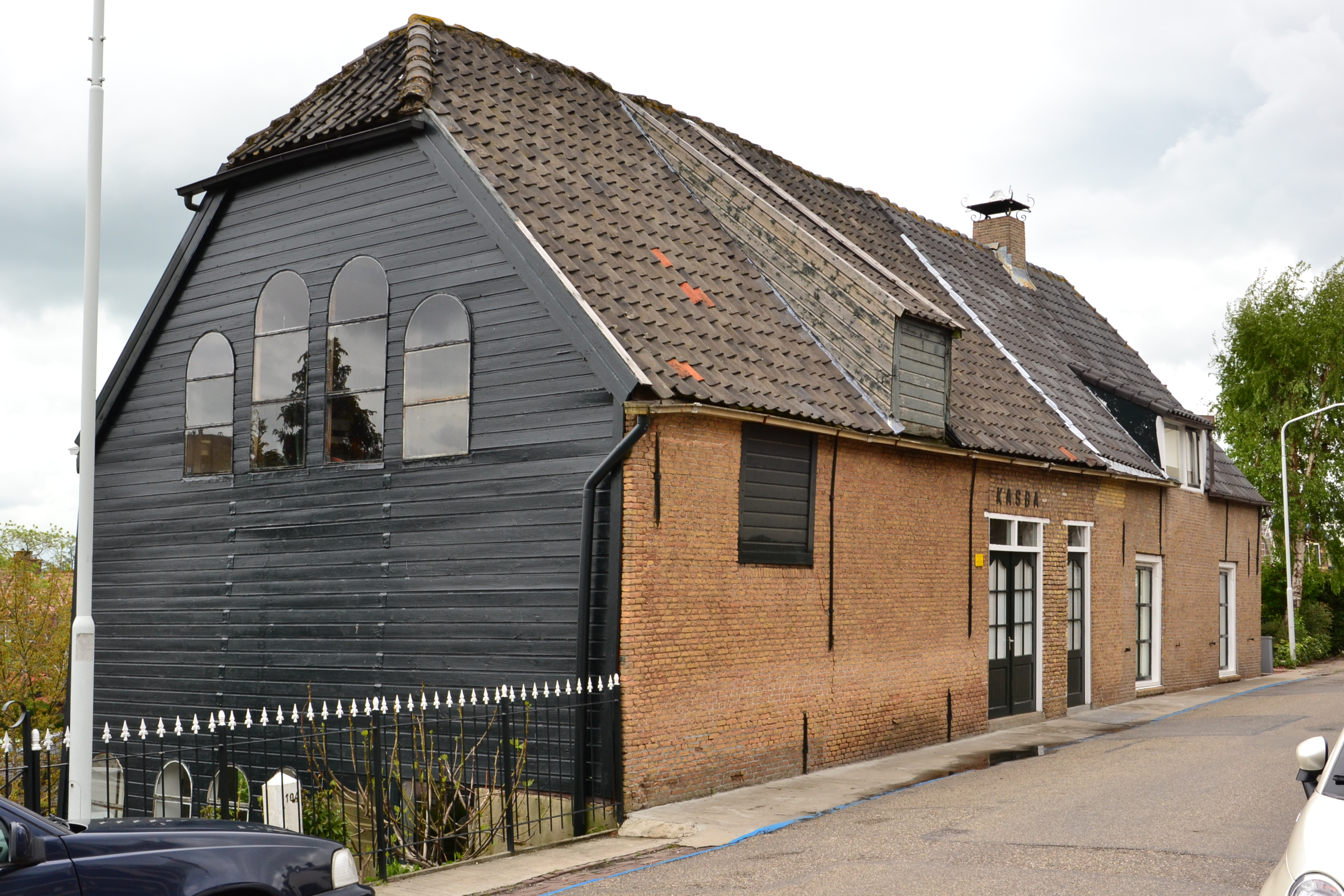
Papendrecht Kasba

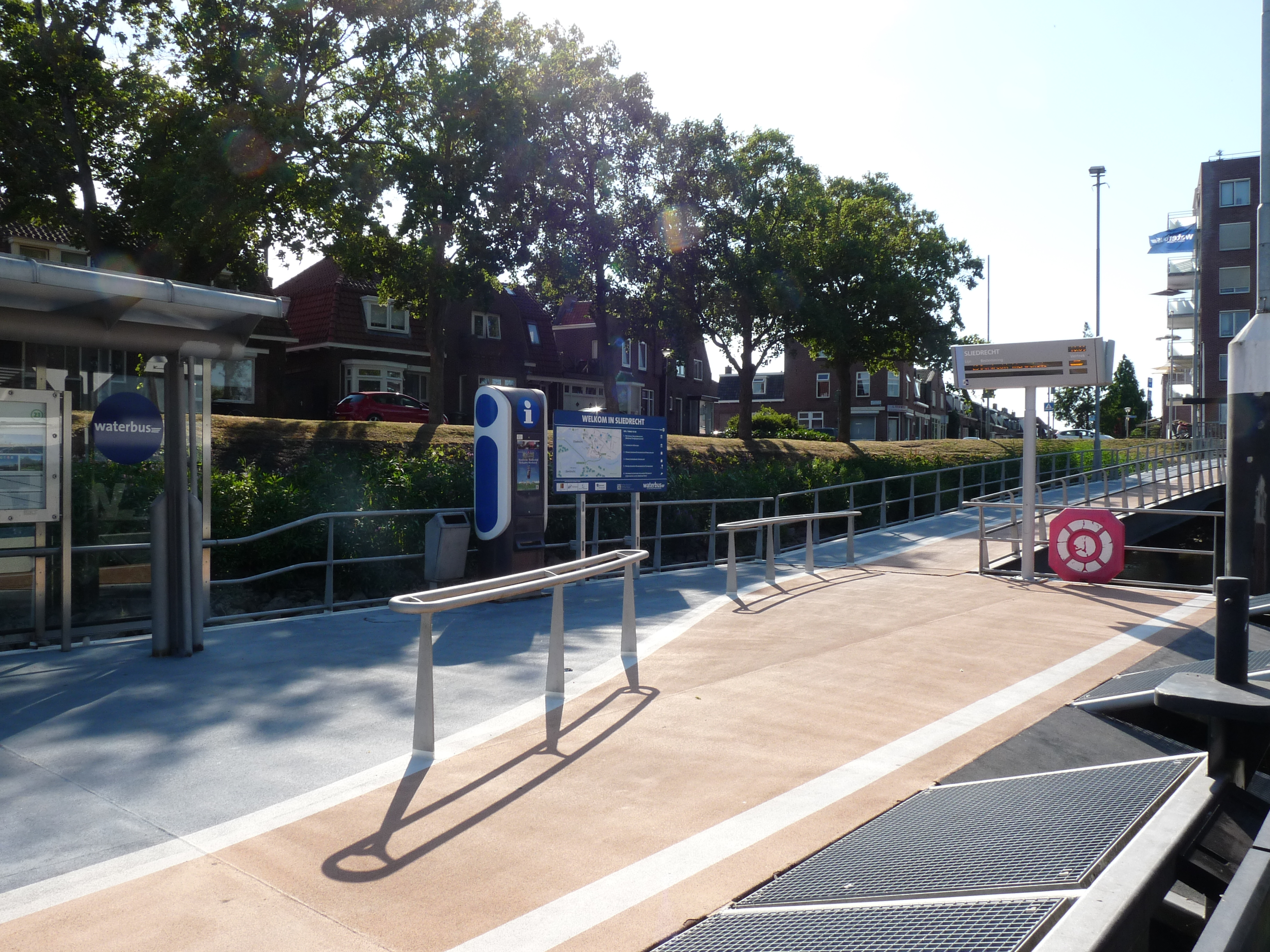
Sliedrecht: waterbus stop
