= Gene Nottolini =

American judge

Gene Nottolini (July 9, 1944 – September 5, 2013) was an American judge, who served as Chief Judge over the Kane County, Illinois area for three years. In 1968, Nottolini joined an Elgin law firm and handled mainly criminal law, until he was promoted as associate judge in late 1984. Upon Judge Joseph McCarthy's full retirement, Nottolini was made an official circuit judge in 1988 and shortly after was appointed the ruler figure of the Family Court Division in 1991. The height of his career occurred in 1993 as he was elected chief judge and continued that position until 1996. He fully retired in late 2005.

== Personal life ==
Nottolini was born and raised as a Catholic in Elgin, Illinois. He attended St. Joseph Catholic School and graduated from St. Edward Central Catholic High School.
