= Daniele Seccarecci =

Italian bodybuilder

- Professional bodybuilder

Personal info
- Born: 10 June 1980; Livorno, Italy
- Died: 3 September 2013 (aged 33); Taranto, Italy

Best statistics
- Height: 1.88 m (6 ft 2 in)
- Weight: 134 kg (295 lb)

Professional (Pro) career
- Best win: Grand Prix IFBB Taranto; 2004
- Active: 2000-2013

Daniele Seccarecci (10 June 1980 – 3 September 2013) was an Italian bodybuilder.

== Biography ==
Born in Livorno, at a young age he moved with his family to Syracuse. From an early age he became interested in the world of bodybuilding, getting good results in the junior category. At 26 years he turned professional and at the 2006 Spanish Grand Prix he went close to qualifying for the Mister Olympia. He was certified in 2010 by the Guinness World Records as the heaviest competitive bodybuilder, with a competition weight of 135 kg (298 lbs). He had an affair with porn star Brigitta Bulgari, whom he casually met at Milan's airport and then a relation with professional bodybuilder Daniela D'Emilia. He was arrested in 2011 under charges of illegal steroid marketing and briefly subject to home detention. He died of a heart attack on 4 September 2013 at 33 years of age in Taranto, just 4 days after his last competition.

== Professional career ==
Year	Location	Event	Category	Result
2000	California	Venice Beach Grand Prix	Juniores	1
2001	Italy	Campionati italiani IFBB	Juniores	1
2003	Italy	Selezioni mondiali WPP	Juniores	1
2003	Italy	Selezioni mondiali WPP	Heavyweight	2
2003		Notte dei campioni IFBB	Heavyweight	4
2003		Ludus maximus IFBB	Heavyweight	4
2004	Italy	Campionati italiani IFBB	Heavyweight	2
2004	Taranto	Grand Prix IFBB Taranto	Heavyweight	1
2005		Campionati mondiali IFBB	Heavyweight	4
2005		Notte dei campioni IFBB	Heavyweight	3
2006		Campionati europei IFBB	Heavyweight	3
2006	Santa Susanna	Santa Susanna Pro Grand Prix IFBB	Heavyweight	5
2006	Austria	Austria Pro Grand Prix IFBB	Heavyweight	8
2006	Romania	Romania Pro Grand Prix IFBB	Heavyweight	5
2007	Pasadena	Iron Man Pro Grand Prix IFBB	Heavyweight	15
2007	Sacramento	Sacramento Pro Grand Prix IFBB	Heavyweight	10
2007	Atlantic City	IFBB Atlantic City Pro	Heavyweight	16
2008	Houston	IFBB Houston Pro Bodybuilding, Fitness & Figure	Heavyweight	8
2009		IFBB Europa Show of Champions	Heavyweight	10
2009	Atlantic City	IFBB Atlantic City Bodybuilding, Fitness & Figure	Heavyweight	11
2010	New York City	IFBB New York Pro Bodybuilding & Bikini	Heavyweight	12
2011	Tijuana	IFBB Tijuana International Pro Bodybuilding & Bikini	Heavyweight	NP
2012	Madrid	IFBB Arnold Classic Europe	Heavyweight	14
2012	Prague	IFBB EVL´s Prague Pro	Heavyweight	14
2013	Lahti	IFBB Nordic Pro	Heavyweight	6
