= Vinod Raina =

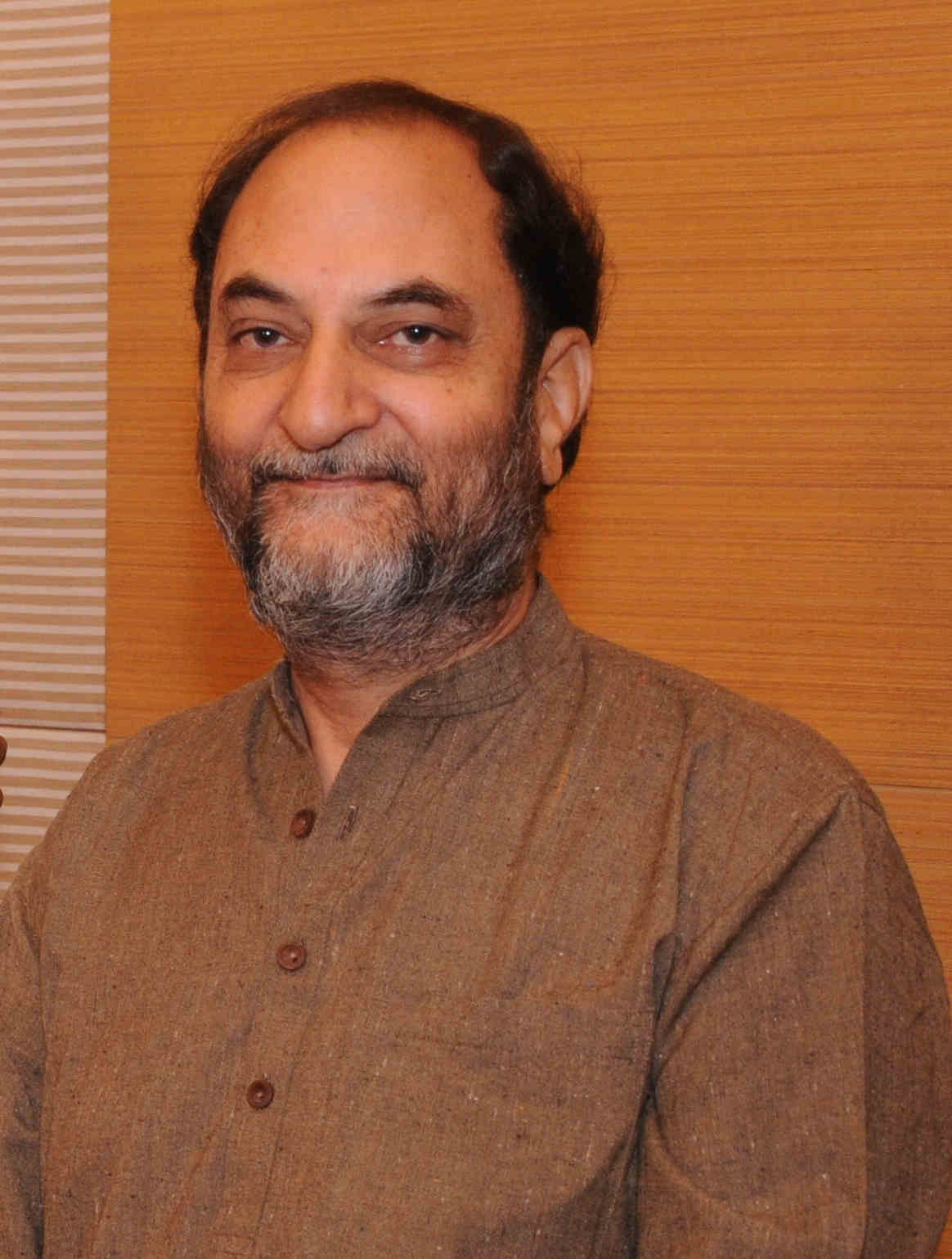
- Vinod Raina
- Occupations: Educationalist & Activist

Vinod Raina (died 12 September 2013) was an Indian educationist. He was a member of drafting of the Right to Education Act.

== Career ==
Vinod Raina resigned from his job at Delhi University to work on education reforms in India. He was one of the co-founders of the Bharat Gyan Vigyan Samiti(BGVS) and All-India People’s Science Network (AIPSN).

He was a Homi Bhabha Fellow, a fellow of the Nehru Memorial Museum and Library, New Delhi, Asia Leadership Fellow, Japan, and an Honorary Fellow of the Indian Science Writers Association. Dr. Raina worked with the Bhopal Gas Disaster victims and the anti-Narmada dam campaign.

He helped conceptualize the Victims of Development project and co-edited the subsequent volume ‘The Dispossessed’.

Dr. Raina was also a member of the International Council of the World Social Forum.

== Death ==
He died of cancer on 12 September 2013.

Very few people know he was suffering from cancer for the last few years of his life. During this period, he actively continued his work, and poured energies into the implementation of the Right to Education Act, as well as the various people's groups and policy committees that he was a part of.

== Awards and honours ==
- Fellow - Homi Bhabha
- Fellow - Nehru Memorial Museum and Library, New Delhi
- Honorary Fellow - Indian Science Writers Association.
- Asia Leadership Fellow (Japan) in 2002.

== Writings /Publications ==
- Where do children go after class VIII?
- The national curriculum framework
- Twenty years of relentless struggle - Bhopal Gas Disaster
- Killing the bill

Books

- Making Sense of Community Participation, Community Participation and Empowerment in Primary Education

== See also ==
- Right of Children to Free and Compulsory Education Act
- World social forum
- Narmada Bachao Andolan
- Bhopal disaster
