= Paolo Zantelli =

Italian motorboat racer (died 2013)

Personal information
- Nationality: Italian
- Died: 15 September 2013 (aged 47–48) Italy
- Years active: c. 1996–2013

Sport
- Sport: Powerboat racing
- Event: UIM F2
Medal record
Gold medal – first place	European Championship	2 times
Silver medal – second place	European Championship	1 time
Bronze medal – third place	European Championship	1 time

Paolo Zantelli (died September 15, 2013) was an Italian F2 racing boat pilot, known for winning two gold European championships, and one silver and one bronze. Zantelli was considered Italy's leading expert of his sports category following a career in the UIM F2 division that spanned 17 years. Zantelli died in hospital at the age of 48, after his racing boat collided with another boat, leaving him underwater and unconscious. He remained underwater for several minutes before being pulled out by life guards. He was then rushed to a hospital in critical condition but soon died of his injuries.
