= Evelyn M. Nowak =

American politician (1913-2013)

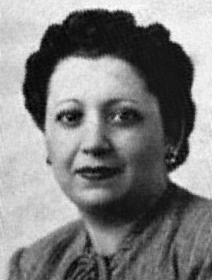

Member of the Michigan House of Representatives from the Wayne County 1st district
- In office January 1, 1945 – 1946

Personal details
- Born: May 18, 1913 Detroit, Michigan, US
- Died: September 30, 2013 (aged 100)
- Party: Democratic
- Spouse: Francis J. Nowak

Evelyn M. Nowak (May 18, 1913 – September 30, 2013) was an American politician, who served as a member of the Michigan House of Representatives from the Wayne County, Michigan 1st district.

== Early life ==
Nowak was born in Detroit, Michigan on May 18, 1913 to John W. and Emma Marshick. Nowak graduated from Western High School in Detroit.

== Career ==
On November 7, 1944, Nowak was elected to as a member of the Michigan House of Representatives where represented the Wayne County 1st distinct. Nowak was sworn in on January 3, 1945. In 1946, Nowak was not re-elected. Nowak was a Democrat.

== Personal life ==
Nowak married Francis J. Nowak, who would also be elected to the Michigan Legislature on July 1, 1939. Together, they had one child.

== Death ==
Nowak died on September 30, 2013.
