= Mamafaka =

Thai graphic designer and street artist

Pharuephon "Tum" Mukdasanit, also known as "Mamafaka" (14 September 1978 – 9 September 2013), was a Thai graphic designer and street artist, best known as the creator of one of the most recognizable characters in Thai pop art: 'MR.HELLYEAH!' a hairy, one-eyed monster with a moustache which appeared on picture frames, paintings, T-shirts, shoes, skateboards, bags, furniture, iPhone cases, graffiti, and champagne bottles. His work also appeared on many local and international fashion and design magazines such as Wallpaper*, CG+ and Territory.

== Life and career ==
Pharuephon was born and raised in Khon Kaen at 13 September 1978. In an interview with BK, he stated that he was "inspired by a Thai designer, Tnop Wangsillapakun", after seeing his work on a magazine from Hong Kong as a child. "I thought, if I really set my mind to design, I could go that far. His courage has always been my biggest inspiration" Pharuephon added.

After finishing a vocational course, he enrolled at Rangsit University, taking up graphic design, "where he fell in love with art", according to the Bangkok Post.

In 2002, during his studies at Rangsit University, he met Rukkit Kuanhawate, another graphic designer, and gathered five other design friends to establish a design group called "B.O.R.E.D." As a result, most Thai graphic designers know him as "Mamafaka B.O.R.E.D." The group was involved in many events, from the Fat Festival to Tiger Translate, and was influential to street art and pop-cultural enthusiasts in Bangkok, and is still going strong in the graphic industry in Thailand.

In 2004, he worked with Ogilvy & Mather right after graduation. Some time later, he moved to work with Creative Juice, Bangkok as a graphics designer, winning a substantial number of awards during his advertising career such as the B.A.D award, Adsman, and Adfest. However his advertising career was only but a brief one.

Throughout his career, he has been involved in several projects, including Tiger Beer's "Tiger translate festival", Bangkok design festival, and a fixed gear event called Ride a Life.

Pharuephon became a freelance designer in 2011, specializing in graphic design, street art and illustration. He then created the fictional character MR.HELLYEAH!, which is a hairy, one-eyed monster with a moustache. The success of MR.HELLYEAH! proved that he would soon launch his own line of product. He was in high demand, working with well-known brands: Converse, Vans, Inc., K-Swiss, Billabong, Preduce Skateboard, CE Toys, M150, Isuzu, Smirnoff, V.O.X, Yamaha, and Tiger Beer. In addition, throughout his career, he was still actively creating fine arts for galleries and exhibitions through Bangkok.

His most recent works include a limited edition design for Vespa in 2013, on top of working with several mini-exhibitions for various brands in late 2012. One of them included his personal brand called 'URFACE', which designs and manufactures bags.

== Death ==
While on holiday in Phuket, Pharuephon reportedly had a surfing accident in Kata Beach on the morning of 7 September 2013. While unconscious, he was rescued by lifeguards and was rushed to Patong Hospital, later moving to Bangkok Hospital, Phuket. After being in a coma for 48 hours, Pharuephon died on 9 September. Pharuephon's funeral was held at his birth province, Khon Kaen, in the North-east of Thailand.
