= Jean Véronis =

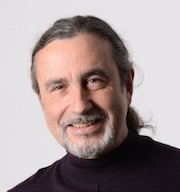
- Born: 3 June 1955; Toulon, France
- Died: 8 September 2013 (aged 58)

Academic background
- Education: Paul Cézanne University

Jean Véronis (3 June 1955 – 8 September 2013) was a French linguist, computer scientist and blogger, and a research professor at Aix-Marseille University. His research interests included natural language processing, text mining and standardisation. He was a founder of the field that is now called digital humanities.

In 2006, his blog was listed among the 15 most influential by Le Monde.

== Bibliography ==
- Contribution to the study of error in natural language man-machine dialogue /Contribution a l'etude de l'erreur dans le dialogue homme-machine en language naturel. Ph.D. Thesis, Aix-Marseille University. 1988. http://hdl.handle.net/10068/23512 / http://www.sudoc.fr/006502245
- Text Encoding Initiative - Background and Context. Nancy Ide and Jean Véronis. 1995. ISBN 978-0-7923-3704-1
- Parallel Text Processing: Alignment and Use of Translation Corpora (Text, Speech and Language Technology). Jean Véronis. 2000
- Parallel Text Processing: Alignment and Use of Translation Corpora (Text, Speech and Language Technology). Jean Véronis. Second edition 2010. ISBN 978-90-481-5555-2
- Les mots de Nicolas Sarkozy. Louis-Jean Calvet and Jean Véronis. 2008. ISBN 978-2-02-095631-4
- Les politiques mis au Net : l'aventure du PoliTIC'Show. Estelle Veronis, Jean Véronis and Nicolas Voisin. 2007. ISBN 978-2-35341-010-1
- Combat Pour l'Elysée : Paroles de prétendants. Louis-Jean Calvet, Jean Véronis and Plantu. 2006. ISBN 978-2-02-089206-3
