= Isamu Jordan =

American journalist, musician, and professor

- Born: Isamu Lee Jordan; Spokane, Washington, US
- Died: September 5, 2013 (aged 37); Spokane, Washington, US
- Other name: Som Jordan
- Education: BA in English Education and Journalism
- Alma mater: Washington State University
- Occupations: Musician, journalist, professor
- Years active: 1990–2013
- Employer(s): The Spokesman-Review, Whitworth University
- Organization: The Som Show
- Known for: Spokane's Online Music Awards, known as "The Sommy Awards"
- Spouse: Rachel Shulman
- Children: 2

Isamu Jordan (September 28, 1975 – September 5, 2013) was an American journalist, musician, and professor. When he was 15 years old, he joined the staff of The Spokesman-Review, where he wrote articles for Our Generation, the teen section of the newspaper. After earning a Bachelor's degree in English and Journalism, he returned to the paper, where he wrote articles about music and pop culture. He also wrote and edited articles for the weekly news magazine Spokane7, which provided coverage on local entertainment, art and culture, dining, and sporting events. As a musician, he was a member of the band The Dead Casuals and was known for establishing the hip hop orchestra, Flying Spiders, in which he was the lead vocalist. As the creator, producer, and director of The Som Show, Jordan provided booking support and concert promotions for local bands and music artists, while his multimedia music website featured artist profiles, events, and venues, along with videos and concert reviews. Spokane's Online Music Awards, known as The Sommy Awards, honored local bands and musicians through nominations made through his website. In addition to his background in journalism and music, Jordan was an adjunct professor and Program Director of Intercultural Student Services at Whitworth University.

== Personal background ==
Isamu Lee "Som" Jordan was born on September 28, 1975, in Spokane, Washington. He was the son of Charles Knight and Tangi Jordan. Raised by his grandmother Carrie Jordan, on the Eastside of Spokane, WA he graduated from Lewis and Clark High School in 1993. During high school, he was chosen by The Spokesman-Review newspaper as one of the first writers for the paper's Our Generation publication, a section of the newspaper that focused on youth issues, written by teenagers from throughout the city. He attended Washington State University, earning a Bachelor's degree in English Education and Journalism.

On February 14, 2001, Jordan married Rachel (née Shulman) Jordan. They had two sons, Caleb and Osiah.

== Professional background ==
Journalism

When Jordan was 15 years old, he joined the staff of The Spokesman-Review, writing for the teen section of the newspaper, titled Our Generation. His first article was an interview with Sir Mix-a-Lot. He later stated that this work taught him that he could "actually get paid to go to concerts and hang out with celebrities." He continued writing for the newspaper through high school, after which he began attending Washington State University. During his summer breaks, he returned to intern with The Spokesman-Review.

After graduating, he joined the staff of The Spokesman-Review on a full-time basis, initially writing articles about Spokane neighborhood news. He later became a music journalist and critic, focusing solely on the local music scene. Throughout his career with the newspaper, his writing focused on music, pop culture, and the Spokane nightlife for Spokane7. He remained with the company through 2008, when his employment ended as a result of corporate-wide restructuring and layoffs.

Academics

Jordan was a civic leader who often spoke in local schools and at community events. In November 2010, Jordan joined the staff of Whitworth University. While he initially served as the Interim Coordinator of Intercultural Student Services, he was later promoted to Program Director of the department and adjunct professor of Communication Studies and Applied Journalism. He was also the faculty advisor of the online radio station Whitworth.FM.

Music

In 2010, Jordan formed the band Flying Spiders, in which he served as the emcee and lead vocalist. He was also a songwriter and performing as a rapper. In 2010, he started working as a DJ with AMP'D Entertainment, an events production company. As the creator, producer, and director of The Som Show, Jordan provided booking support and concert promotions for local bands and music artists, while his multimedia music website featured artist profiles, events, and venues, along with audio and video downloads. Spokane's Online Music Awards, known as The Sommy Awards, honored local bands and musicians through nominations made through his website.

== Death ==
Jordan died on September 5, 2013, from a suicide. According to the family spokesperson, Anne Walter, Jordan had "battled very serious depression. A lot of his struggle was fighting it. Trying to keep it private." Walter was one of Jordan's first editors at the newspaper. She is the godmother of Jordan's two sons, while her husband, author Jess Walter, is their godfather. Following his death, benefit concerts and auctions were held throughout the city to provide financial support for his family and establish scholarships for his children.
