= Christoph Schumann =

German political scientist

Christoph Schumann (25 April 1969 – 1 September 2013) was a German political scientist.

== Career ==
After graduating with an Abitur from Ernst-Mach-Gymnasium Haar in 1988 and serving in alternative civilian service in Munich, Schumann studied history, political science and Islamic studies from 1993 to 1996 at the University of Würzburg. He finished his thesis with the title „Radikalnationalismus in Syrien und Libanon. Politische Sozialisation und Elitenbildung, 1930–1958“ ("Radical Nationalism in Syria and Lebanon. Political Socialisation and Elite Formation, 1930–1958"), in July 2000. From 2007 to 2009 he was assistant professor at the Institute for Islamic Studies and Modern Oriental Philology at the University of Bern. From February 2009 until his death, he was professor for politics and contemporary history of the Middle East at the Institute for Political Science at the University of Erlangen-Nuremberg, where he had already worked as a research assistant from 2000 to 2007.

== Christoph Schumann remembrance award ==
In remembrance of Christoph Schumann, the Faculty of Humanities, Social Sciences, and Theology at the University of Erlangen-Nuremberg awards a remembrance award in honour of Schumann to students with excellent bachelor's or master's theses about the contemporary Middle East.
