= Ramachandra Deva =

Noted writer in Kannada (1948–2013)

Ramachandra Deva (Ramachandrayya Deva) (22 March 1948 – 11 September 2013) was an Indian writer. Deva was born in Kote Mundugaru village in Karnataka, India, to Deva Raghavendrayya and Honnamma.

== Education ==
Deva completed his schooling in Kalmadka, Balila, Panja and Puttur and received BA and MA degrees in English literature from the University of Mysore. Bangalore University awarded him a Ph.D for his comparative analysis of Shakespeare translations in English and Indian languages, with particular reference to Kannada-language versions of his plays.

He worked as an English lecturer at Milagres College, Kalyanapura; Banumaiah College, Mysore; and National College, Bangalore. Deva served as librarian for the United States Library of Congress Office. He went on to work as assistant editor for the newspaper Prajavani, worked as head of printers' Prakashana and worked as a successful farmer. He translated William Shakespeare's Hamlet and Macbeth to Kannada in the 1970s, which have received considerable praise and are popularly staged.

== Works ==
Deva was an accomplished Kannada poet, writer and playwright. His works include Indraprastha, Mathaduva mara, Samagra kavya (poetry), Dangeya prakarana, Moogela mattu itara kathegalu (stories), Shakespeare yeradu samskrutigalalli (research work), Mucchu mathu itara lekhanagalu, Matukate (collection of articles), and plays like Kudure banthu kudure, Kolalu mattu shankha, and Kalemba kambavu. He wrote scripts for a film by Indian director Girish Kasaravalli and for a documentary on Bhutaradhane by B.V. Karanth. He was the chairman of Bodhi Trust which is a literary cultural organization that publishes books.His work “Mutthu Mattu Ithara Lekhanagalu” won the prestigious “Inandar Award”.

He also held Kavyodyoga, an archive for Indian poetry in English translation and also the other Indian languages.

== Death and legacy ==
Deva died on 11 September 2013 due to a heart ailment at the age of 67 in Bangalore. His plays and translations continue to be popular and staged regularly, paying homage to his talent.
