= Ko Wierenga =

Dutch politician

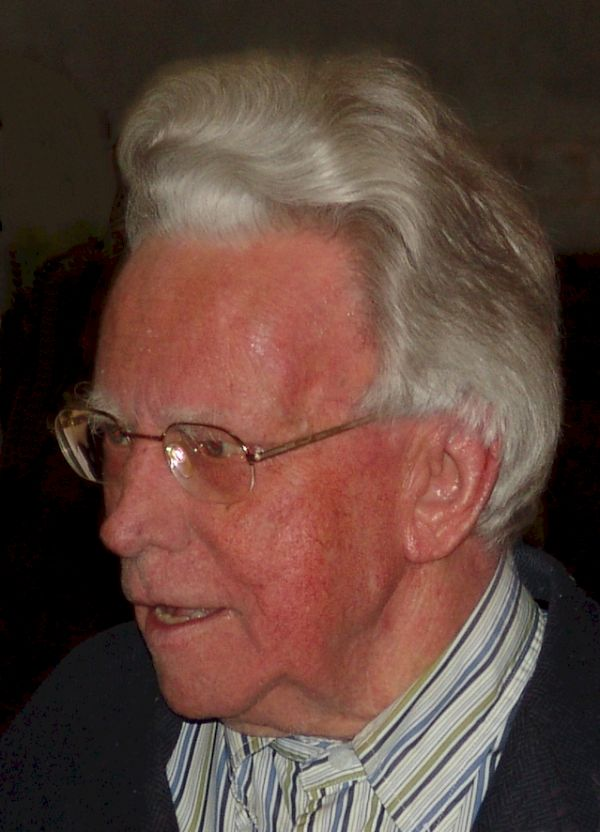
- Wierenga in 2007

Mayor of Enschede
- In office September 1977 – April 1994
- Preceded by: Auke Johannes Vleer
- Succeeded by: Jan Mans

Personal details
- Born: 6 March 1933; Borger, Netherlands
- Died: 21 September 2013; Enschede, Netherlands
- Political party: Labour Party (PvdA)

Heiko "Ko" Wierenga (6 March 1933 – 21 September 2013) was a Dutch politician and member of the Labour Party (PvdA). He served as the Mayor of the municipality of Enschede from September 1977 until April 1994. Under Wierenga, artwork by Joop Hekman, called Het ei van Ko, was installed near Enschede's town hall in 1984.

Prior to becoming Mayor, Wierenga served in the House of Representatives from 1967 to 1977. He then worked for the Centraal Bureau voor de Arbeidsvoorziening as leaving the mayor's office in 1994.

Wierenga was honored as a Knight of the Order of the Netherlands Lion on 29 April 1987.

Ko Wierenga died on 21 September 2013 at the age of 80.

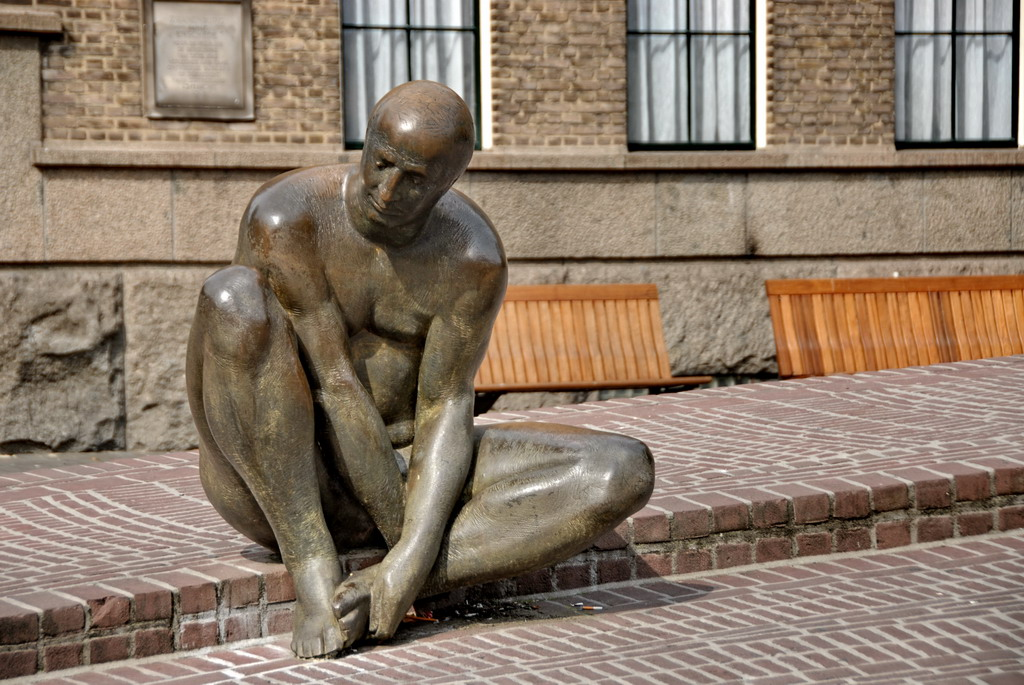
Het ei van Ko (detail) in the Langestraat, Enschede
