= Shahid Qureshi (cricketer) =

Pakistani cricketer (1938–2013)

Personal information
- Born: 1938
- Died: 2 September 2013 (aged 74–75)
- Source: ESPNcricinfo, 31 May 2016

Shahid Qureshi (1938 – 2 September 2013) was a Pakistani cricketer. He played twenty first-class cricket matches for several domestic teams in Pakistan between 1954 and 1965. A motorcycle accident brought an end to his cricketing career.

He moved to the US with his family and spent many years in the Chicago and Houston areas. He left behind a wife, Azra Qureshi, daughter Ambreen Khan, son Amar Qureshi, and 6 grandchildren: Amaan, Soman, Samah, Maha, Muhammad, and Hamza. All live in Dallas and Houston.
