= Flora Arca Mata =

- Mata in 2009
- Born: December 19, 1917; Honolulu, Hawaii
- Died: September 11, 2013 (aged 95); Stockton, California
- Occupation: Teacher
- Known for: First Filipino American teacher in California
- Spouse: Vidal Mata
- Children: 2

Academic background
- Education: University of California, Los Angeles

Flora Arca Mata (December 19, 1917 – September 11, 2013) was an American teacher in Stockton, California. She became the first Filipino American teacher in California. In 2019, a new elementary school was named after her in the Stockton Unified School District.

== Biography ==
Mata was born in Honolulu, to Jose Arca and Victoria Salcedo, who were from Cavite and Bacolod respectively. Mata's family moved to Stockton when she was two; they were attracted to Stockton because of Little Manila, which had one of the largest Filipino communities in the United States at the time. She was the second youngest of six siblings. While baptized a Roman Catholic, as a child she attended an interfaith Protestant church, and converted to Protestantism. In 1930, her father who was working as a labor contractor, died in an automobile accident.

Funded by an older sister, who was working as a farmworker, Mata attended college at the University of California, Los Angeles (UCLA). While at UCLA, she got to know her fellow student Jackie Robinson. She became the first Filipino American to graduate from UCLA. She married her classmate Vidal Mata. The then-Dean of UCLA encouraged both of them to move to Hawaii, due to the difficulty of educated Filipinos to be hired as professionals in California during that time. After graduating in 1940 she worked as a tutor and domestic worker for the Dorrance family; her husband worked for Boris Karloff. Later that year, they moved to the Philippines, where they sought jobs as teachers. They remained in the Philippines during World War II and returned to the United States afterward with Karloff's assistance.

In 1948, Mata was hired as a teacher by the Stockton Unified School District; she became the first Filipino American teacher in California. Throughout her career, Mata taught in schools outside of north Stockton, as it was uncommon for minority teachers to teach in schools in north Stockton. In 1980, Mata retired, yet continued to substitute teach well into the rest of the decade.

In 2013, Mata died, survived by two children, and twenty one grandchildren and great-grandchildren, one of whom is a kindergarten teacher.

== Legacy ==
In late 2019, through the efforts of the Filipino American community, a new elementary school in the Quail Lakes neighborhood of Stockton was named after Mata. The efforts were led by the organization Little Manila Rising, who initially placed her name as an option for the new school.
