= Scott Workman =

American stuntman and actor

William Scott Workman (September 16, 1966 – September 29, 2013) was an American stuntman and actor whose career spanned over the course of 20 years. Workman's contributed to both film and television, including the films Crank and End of Days. Workman participated in several Marvel Cinematic Universe productions, beginning with Iron Man 2 and continuing posthumously with Captain America: The Winter Soldier. Television credits include The X-Files, Buffy the Vampire Slayer and Sons of Anarchy.

Workman died of cancer on September 29, 2013, in Calabasas, California, aged 47.
