= Methodius Petrovtsy =

Ukrainian Orthodox bishop

Bishop Methodius (secular name Dmitry Ivanovich Petrovtsy; October 30, 1941 – September 13, 2013) was a bishop of the Ukrainian Orthodox Church (Moscow Patriarchate)

== Notes ==
- Obituary in Russian
