= Patricia Kenner =

Member of the South Dakota House of Representatives from the 27th district
- In office 1975–1979

Member of the Rapid City Board of Education
- In office 1972–1988
- Succeeded by: Bill Echterling

Personal details
- Born: Patricia Eileen Maguire; July 9, 1929 Triumph, Minnesota
- Died: September 28, 2013 (aged 84) Rapid City, South Dakota
- Party: Democratic
- Children: 7

Patricia Eileen Kenner (née Maguire, July 9, 1929 – September 28, 2013) was an American politician and registered nurse. She served two terms in the South Dakota House of Representatives as a member of the Democratic Party.

== Early life and education ==
Kenner was born on July 9, 1929, in Triumph, Minnesota to parents Gerald and Ethel Maguire. At an early age, her family moved to South Dakota, where she attended Rapid City High School. She became a registered nurse after attending the University of South Dakota for one year of pre-medical and St. John's McNamara (now Rapid City Regional Hospital) for three years of nursing.

In 1952, she married her husband, Robert Kenner, with whom she had 7 children.

== Political career ==
In May 1972, Kenner filed to run for a five-year term on the Rapid City, South Dakota Board of Education, winning election the following month.

In 1974, she won election to the South Dakota House of Representatives as one of six representatives from the 27th district. (Note: At the time, South Dakota's 27th district elected three state senators and six state representatives to the South Dakota Legislature. Today, all 35 of South Dakota's legislative districts elect one state senator and two state representatives.) During her time in the House, she sponsored bills related to education, healthcare, and the environment, including the first "generic drug bill", which allowed pharmacists to substitute brand-name prescriptions with their generic equivalents. She was re-elected to the House in 1976, but lost re-election in 1978.

Following her time in the House, Kenner continued her position as a member of the Rapid City Board of Education, being elected the Board's president in 1984. She lost re-election to the Board in 1988 to challenger Bill Echterling.

== Later life ==
After losing re-election, Kenner continued to serve on various state councils, including the Vocational Education, Private Industry, and Community Health Advisory Councils, as well as the South Dakota Department of Labor's Workforce Development Council, a position she held until 2010. She was also a member of the Rapid City Public Art Committee, where she served until her resignation in 2001.

In 2002, Kenner, a Roman Catholic, was named by Bishop Blase Cupich to a review board for sexual abuse cases in the Diocese of Rapid City. The review board was designed to advise Bishop Cupich on ensuring the diocese's compliance with the then-recently approved Charter for the Protection of Children and Young People.

== Death ==
Kenner died on September 28, 2013, in Rapid City, South Dakota, at the age of 84.

== Honors ==
During her lifetime, Kenner was honored by multiple organizations throughout South Dakota. In 1988, the South Dakota Legislature unanimously passed HCR1002, a bill which honored Kenner as the Outstanding School Board member of the year. Governor Bill Janklow proclaimed August 22, 2002 to be Patricia Kenner Day in her honor. She also received the Equity Award from the South Dakota American Association of University Women, the Award of Merit from the South Dakota Vocational Education Association, and the Distinguished Service Award from the Western Dakota Vocational Technical Institute.
