= Ernst Gutting =

- Titular bishop of Sufar
- Church: Roman Catholic Church
- See: Titular see of Sufar
- In office: 1971–2013
- Predecessor: Carlos Schmitt
- Successor: Robert Francis Prevost Later Leo XIV
- Previous posts: Auxiliary Bishop of Diocese of Speyer; Bishop

Orders
- Ordination: July 3, 1949

Personal details
- Born: January 30, 1919 Ludwigshafen, Germany
- Died: September 27, 2013 (aged 94) Kaiserslautern, Germany
- Coat of arms

Ernst Gutting (January 30, 1919 – September 27, 2013) was a German prelate of the Roman Catholic Church. As of 2013 he was the oldest German Roman Catholic bishop.

Gutting was born in Ludwigshafen, Germany, and was ordained a priest on July 3, 1949. Gutting was appointed auxiliary bishop of the Diocese of Speyer, as well as titular bishop of Sufar, on May 31, 1971 and ordained a bishop on September 12, 1971. Gutting retired as auxiliary bishop of the Diocese of Speyer on February 24, 1994.
