= Dominique Loiseau =

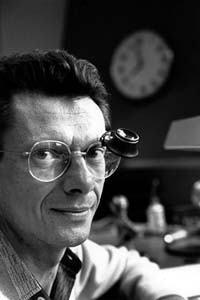
- Loiseau in 1990, photo by Erling Mandelmann
- Born: 16 February 1949; Boulogne-Billancourt, France
- Died: 18 September 2013 (aged 64)
- Education: Philosophy, Nanterre university. Ecole d’Horlogerie d’Anet, Dreux.
- Occupation: watchmaker

Dominique Loiseau (16 February 1949 – 18 September 2013) was a French and Swiss watchmaker who worked at the highest levels of complex horology from the mid 1970s onwards. He was the creator of several notable timepieces, including six Montres de Sables, the Rose de Temps clock, the Renaissance or Capriccio pocket watches and the Blancpain 1735 wristwatch. In 2011 he presented, the Loiseau 1f4, one of the most complicated automatic watches with eight patents. Loiseau announced in 2012 a collaboration with Swiss watch manufacturer Girard-Perregaux.

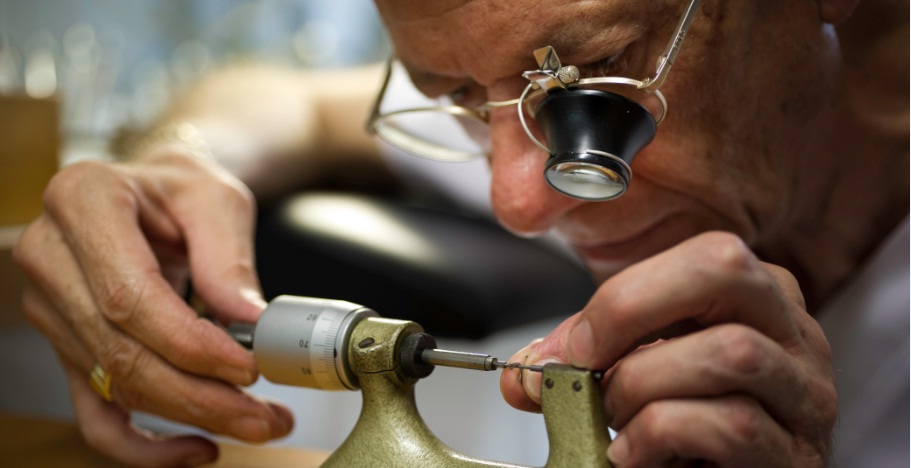
Dominique Loiseau

== His life ==
Loiseau was born in Boulogne-Billancourt. Originally, Dominique ignored his father's desire that he continue the family's watchmaking tradition of father and grandfather alike, beginning instead his life as an academic with studies of literature, art and history, later obtaining a degree in philosophy at the University of Paris at Nanterre. By pure coincidence, the period of his studies there were centered within the hotbed episode of French student revolution marked by the May 1968 protests that would later spread across the nation, changing French society forever....and Dominique Loiseau himself. His experiences during this revolutionary period in contemporary European history made him think again about the future and his father's respect for ‘creating with one’s own hands’. This led him to the decision to study watchmaking at the renowned l’Ecole d’horlogerie d’Anet at Dreux in France later followed by a study at the Technicum de La Chaux-de-Fonds, in Switzerland. Shortly after completing these studies, he was appointed head of restoration at the musée international d'horlogerie in la Chaux-de-Fonds where he worked for three years, later embarking on a large series of high-profile restorations with his own company, among which was the restoration of the Pierre Jaquet-Droz automata La Musicienne.

In the end, what would fire his spirit would be the creation and design of clocks, pocket watches and wristwatches to the highest standards of horology, which he would invent and construct from a blank canvas. Working behind the scenes for various brands, he went on to create one after another in quick succession: the Renaissance, a Grande Sonnerie complication pocket watch; the free-form Cappriccio tourbillon pocket watch; the highly complex Rose des Temps table clock; the 6 Montres des Sables, a series of pocket watches each with a different complication; the Alpha-Omega automaton; and the widely acclaimed Blancpain 1735, recipient of numerous prizes and accolades.

== See also ==
- Girard-Perregaux
- Blancpain
