= Khin Maung Kyi =

- ခင်မောင်ကြည်
- Born: 10 September 1926; Pyinmana, British Burma
- Died: 6 September 2013 (aged 86); Singapore
- Education: University of Rangoon; Harvard University; Cornell University
- Occupation: Economist

Khin Maung Kyi (Burmese: ခင်မောင်ကြည်; 10 September 1926 – 6 September 2013) was a Burmese economist and scholar. He also served as a government consultant to several of Burma's ministries.

== Early life and education ==
Khin Maung Kyi was born in Phyu, a small town in central Burma. He earned a bachelor's degree in commerce at the University of Rangoon. Thereafter, he received a scholarship to attend Harvard University, where he earned a master's degree in business administration. He went on to earn a doctorate in management at Cornell University.

== Career ==
From 1954 to 1978, he worked as a lecturer and professor at the University of Rangoon's Institute of Economics. In 1978, Khin Maung Kyi left the country. He accepted a teaching post in Malaysia to teach as a professor of agribusiness at Universiti Pertanian Malaysia. He later became an Associate professor in the School of Management(National University of Singapore) in 1979 a position he held until 1988. In 1983, he founded the Asia Pacific Journal of Management, which became the National University of Singapore's School of Management's (now NUS Business School) flagship journal. From 1983 to September 1988, he served as the journal's first editor-in-chief. In 1991, he became a senior fellow at National University of Singapore's Department of Business Policy.

== Death ==
Khin Maung Kyi died on 6 September 2013, four days before his 87th birthday. Although he suffered from various illnesses in his remaining years, his cause of death was attributed to complications from a lung infection. His wife and four children survived him.

== Notable works ==
- Economic Development of Burma: A Vision and a Strategy (2000)
