= Noel Olsen =

British physician (1946–2013)

Noel David Lyche Olsen (20 January 1946 – 2 September 2013) was a doctor and public health consultant who lobbied the tobacco, food and alcohol industries to stop promoting unhealthy lifestyles.

== Early life and education ==
Olsen was born in Hampstead, north London where he attended Mill Hill School. After graduation from high school, he moved to St George's, University of London where he was trained as a physician. By 1969, he got qualified by the board and went into pulmonology career. After being appointed as the youngest consultant in his homeland, the United Kingdom, Olsen was appointed as consultant chest physician at Barking and Dagenham hospital in 1974. The hospital failed to satisfy his learning about lung cancer treatment, resulting in his interest shift toward the social origins of disease. Soon, Olsen chose to resume his practice in public health medicine, receiving an MSc from the London School of Hygiene & Tropical Medicine and later becoming NHS fellow at Henley Business School.

== Career ==
Olsen was a campaigner for healthy living. In 1979 he showed politicians the alarming causes of deaths in their constituency, eventually opening their eyes toward the size of their local problem. In 1980s, prior to attending the annual meeting of the British American Tobacco (to ask them sensitive questions), Olsen bought company's shares. He also was an instigator of National Taskforce for Physical Activity, the Air Quality Strategy Forum, and the Fuel Poverty Advisory Group whose job was to monitor fuel poverty in the United Kingdom. Olsen was also a supporter of Action on Smoking and Health and the National Heart Forum, raising public awareness for lung cancer and other forms of inhaling diseases. His pressure of tobacco, food and alcohol industries led to the nationwide government endorsed health warning label campaign which was adopted to be used on cigarette packets and the passing of the Tobacco Advertising and Promotions Act in 2002.

Despite his crusade for better heath, Olsen died of prostate cancer at the age of 67.
