= Lloyd Mayer =

American gastroenterologist (1952–2013)

- Lloyd Mayer, Co-Director of the Immunology Institute at Mount Sinai
- Born: June 21, 1952; Bronx, NY
- Died: September 5, 2013 (aged 61); New York, NY
- Education: Union College; Mount Sinai School of Medicine
- Years active: 1976-2013
- Known for: Crohn's disease, colitis, inflammatory bowel disease, CCFA, gp180, immunology, immunobiology, gastroenterology
- Spouse: Jill Mayer
- Medical career
- Profession: gastroenterologist and immunologist
- Institutions: Mount Sinai Medical Center
- Sub-specialties: gastroenterology immunology microbiology
- Research: Crohn's disease, colitis, inflammatory bowel disease, CCFA, gp180, immunology, immunobiology, gastroenterology
- Awards: Graduated from the Icahn School of Medicine at Mount Sinai in 1976 and received the Mosby Award for Clinical Excellence at that time. Saul Horowitz Award, Irma T. Hirschl Trust Career Development Award, Jeffrey Modell Foundation Lifetime Achievement Award, Jaffe Food Allergy Institute Award for Scientific Excellence, Crohn's and Colitis Foundation of America (CCFA) Scientific Achievement Award, Chief of the Division of Clinical Immunology at Mount Sinai, Vice Chair of Medicine at Mount Sinai, David and Dorothy Merksamer Professor of Medicine in 1994, Professor of Immunobiology and Chair of the Immunobiology Center, Chief of the Division of Gastroenterology from 2003 to 2010, Professor and Co-Director of the Immunology Institute. Chairman of the National Scientific Advisory Committee of the CCFA from 2008-2012.

Lloyd Mayer (June 21, 1952 – September 5, 2013) was an American gastroenterologist and immunologist. He was Professor and Co-Director of the Immunology institute at the Mount Sinai Medical Center, now known as the Marc and Jennifer Lipschultz Precision Immunology Institute.

Mayer's research on inflammatory bowel disease pathogenesis was among the first to demonstrate the role played by T-regulatory cells in setting the stage for chronic mucosal inflammation (IBD). He was the first to describe the role of T cells in immunoglobulin class switching and to identify a novel T-cell-derived cytokine (446-BCDF) that stimulates antibody secretion by human B cells.

Mayer was Professor and Co-Director of the Immunology institute at the Mount Sinai Medical Center and the Dorothy and David Merksamer Professor of Medicine, as well as Professor of Microbiology at the Mount Sinai School of Medicine.

Mayer was the author of multiple book chapters and close to 200 peer-reviewed papers. He has been included in New York Magazine’s list of Best Doctors since its inception in the 1990s.

Dr. Mayer died following a three-year battle with brain cancer (Glioblastoma) in September 2013.

== Biography ==
Mayer was born in 1952. He earned his medical degree from the Mount Sinai School of Medicine in 1976. He completed an internship and a residency in Internal Medicine at Bellevue Hospital Center/New York University in 1979 and a fellowship in Gastroenterology at the Mount Sinai Medical Center in 1981.

Mayer held an appointment at the Rockefeller University from 1980–1984, first as a post-doctoral fellow then Assistant Professor. He was Associate Professor of Medicine and Microbiology at Mount Sinai Medical Center from 1985–1986 and was named Director of the Division of Clinical Immunology in 1986. He was named Professor of both Medicine and Microbiology in 1990, then Vice Chair of Medicine. In 1994, he became the David and Dorothy Merksamer Chair of Medicine, and in 1997, Professor of Immunobiology and Chair of Mount Sinai's Immunobiology Center.

From 1992–1997, Mayer served on the Immunological Sciences Study Section of the National Institutes of Health.

Mayer served as Director of the Mount Sinai's Division of Gastroenterology from 2003–2010. In 2007, he was named Co-Director of Mount Sinai's Immunology Institute. He has served as Chairman of the National Scientific Advisory Committee of the Crohn's & Colitis Foundation of America since 2008.

Mayer was elected to the American Society for Clinical Investigation in 1991 and the Association of American Physicians in 1997. He was an active member of the American Board of Internal Medicine and Gastroenterology at the time of his death.

== Honors and awards ==
- Sigma Xi (Science Honor Society), 1972
- Alpha Omega Alpha, 1975 and 1976
- Mosby Award for Clinical Excellence, 1976
- Irma T. Hirschl Trust Award, 1986
- Saul Horowitz, Jr. Award, 1986
- Jeffrey Modell Foundation Lifetime Achievement Award, 1990
- American Society for Clinical Investigation, 1991
- Immunological Sciences Study section, 1992–1997
- Association of American Physicians, 1997
- Jaffe Food Allergy Institute Scientific Achievement Award, 1998
- Scientific Achievement Award, Crohn's and Colitis Foundation of America, 2000
- Jacobi Medallion, 2002
- Scientific Achievement in IBD: Basic Research Award, Crohn's & Colitis Foundation of America, 2010

== Current research ==
=== Grants ===
A partial list of active grants on which Mayer is a principal or co-investigator:

- Immunologic Basis of Cow Milk-Induced Hypersensitivities, NIH/NIAD, 5 U19 AI044236-11
- Innate/Adaptive Immune Interaction in Gut Inflammation, NIH/NIDDK, 5 P01 DK072201-04
- Cellular & Molecular Defects in Human B Cell Development, NIH/NIAID, 5 P01 AI061093-05
- Immunobiology of Peanut Allergy and its Treatment: A Prototype, NIH/NIAID, 1 U19 AI066738-03
- Epithelial TLR Signaling and IgA Production, NIH/NIAID, 1 R21 AI083381-01
- Oral Vaccine Platform for Class A Bacterial Agents, NIH, 1 R01 AI084952
- Generation and Characterization of Intestinal CD8+ Regulatory T cell lines, NIH 1 RC1 DK086605

=== Clinical trials ===
Active clinical trials include:

- Infliximab for post-op recurrence of Crohn's disease

== Publications ==
Partial list:

- Blázquez, Ana Belén; Knight, Adina Kay; Getachew, Hoheteberhan; Bromberg, Jonathan S.; Lira, Sergio A.; Mayer, Lloyd; Berin, M. Cecilia (January 2010). "A functional role for CCR6 on proallergic T cells in the gastrointestinal tract". Gastroenterology. 138 (1): 275–84.e1–4. doi:10.1053/j.gastro.2009.09.016. PMC 2813342. PMID 19782082.
- Sicherer, Scott H.; Wood, Robert A.; Stablein, Donald; Burks, A. Wesley; Liu, Andrew H.; Jones, Stacie M.; Fleischer, David M.; Leung, Donald Y.M.; Grishin, Alexander (May 2010). "Immunologic features of infants with milk or egg allergy enrolled in an observational study (Consortium of Food Allergy Research) of food allergy". J. Allergy Clin. Immunol. 125 (5): 1077–1083.e8. doi:10.1016/j.jaci.2010.02.038. PMC 2868273. PMID 20451041.
- Sandborn, WJ; Colombel, J-F; Frankel, M; Hommes, D; Lowder, J; Mayer, L; Plevy, S; Stokkers, P; Travis, S; et al. (2010). "Anti-CD3 Antibody Visilizumab is Not Effective in Patients with Intravenous Corticosteroid-Refractory Ulcerative Colitis" (PDF). Gut. 59 (11): 1485–92. doi:10.1136/gut.2009.205443. PMID 20947884. S2CID 39461570.
- Blázquez, AB; Mayer, L; Berin, MC. (2010). "Thymic Stromal Lymphopoietin is Required for Gastrointestinal Allergy but not Oral Tolerance". Gastroenterology. 139 (4): 1301–9. doi:10.1053/j.gastro.2010.06.055. PMID 20600023.
- Murphy, Seamus Joseph; Mayer, Lloyd; Abreu, Maria T. (January 2011). "Mesalamine (5-aminosalicylic acid) therapy well tolerated in a patient with aspirin hypersensitivity and ulcerative colitis". J. Clin. Gastroenterol. 45 (1): 83–4. doi:10.1097/MCG.0b013e3181dffcb4. PMID 20535023.
- Roda, Giulia; Caponi, Alessandra; Benevento, Marco; Nanni, Paolo; Mezzanotte, Laura; Belluzzi, Andrea; Mayer, Lloyd; Roda, Aldo (July 2010). "New proteomic approaches for biomarker discovery in inflammatory bowel disease". Inflamm. Bowel Dis. 16 (7): 1239–46. doi:10.1002/ibd.21212. PMID 20127998. S2CID 9266393.
- Baumgart DC, Targan SR, Dignass AU, et al. (April 2010). "Prospective randomized open-label multicenter phase I/II dose escalation trial of visilizumab (HuM291) in severe steroid-refractory ulcerative colitis". Inflamm. Bowel Dis. 16 (4): 620–9. doi:10.1002/ibd.21084. PMID 19714757. S2CID 32967093.
- Viejo-Borbolla, A; Martin, A P; Muniz, L R; Shang, L; Marchesi, F; Thirunarayanan, N; Harpaz, N; Garcia, R A; et al. (2010). "Attenuation of TNF-driven murine ileitis by intestinal expression of the viral immunomodulator CrmD". Mucosal Immunology. 3 (6): 633–44. doi:10.1038/mi.2010.40. PMC 2979317. PMID 20664576.
- Bongers, Gerold; Maussang, David; Muniz, Luciana R.; Noriega, Vanessa M.; Fraile-Ramos, Alberto; Barker, Nick; Marchesi, Federica; Thirunarayanan, Nanthakumar; Vischer, Henry F. (November 2010). "The cytomegalovirus-encoded chemokine receptor US28 promotes intestinal neoplasia in transgenic mice". J. Clin. Invest. 120 (11): 3969–78. doi:10.1172/JCI42563. PMC 2964974. PMID 20978345.
- Yu, Joyce E.; De Ravin, Suk See; Uzel, Gulbu; Landers, Carol; Targan, Stephan; Malech, Harry L.; Holland, Steven M.; Cao, Wenqing; Harpaz, Noam (January 2011). "High levels of Crohn's disease-associated anti-microbial antibodies are present and independent of colitis in chronic granulomatous disease". Clin. Immunol. 138 (1): 14–22. doi:10.1016/j.clim.2010.08.003. PMC 3061829. PMID 20956091.
- Dahan, S; Rabinowitz, K; Martin, AP; Berin, MC; Unkeless, JC; Mayer, L (2011). "The Notch-1 signaling pathway regulates intestinal epithelial barrier function in mice and humans through interaction with CD4+ T cells". Gastroenterology. 140 (2): 550–9. doi:10.1053/j.gastro.2010.10.057. PMC 3031772. PMID 21056041.
- Fukata, Masayuki; Shang, Limin; Santaolalla, Rebeca; Sotolongo, John; Pastorini, Cristhine; España, Cecilia; Ungaro, Ryan; Harpaz, Noam; Cooper, Harry S (July 2011). "Constitutive activation of epithelial TLR4 augments inflammatory responses to mucosal injury and drives colitis-associated tumorigenesis". Inflamm. Bowel Dis. 17 (7): 1464–73. doi:10.1002/ibd.21527. PMC 3117047. PMID 21674704.
- Hovhannisyan, Z; Treatman, J; Littman, D; Mayer, L (2011). "Characterization of IL-17-producing regulatory T cells in inflamed gut mucosa". Gastroenterology. 140 (3): 957–65. doi:10.1053/j.gastro.2010.12.002. PMC 3049831. PMID 21147109.
- Dotan, Iris; Werner, Lael; Vigodman, Sharon; Agarwal, Shradha; Pfeffer, Jorge; Horowitz, Noya; Malter, Lisa; Abreu, Maria; Ullman, Thomas (February 2012). "Normal response to vaccines in inflammatory bowel disease patients treated with thiopurines". Inflamm. Bowel Dis. 18 (2): 261–8. doi:10.1002/ibd.21688. PMC 3919517. PMID 21438101.
- Dunkin, David; Berin, M. Cecilia; Mayer, Lloyd (December 2011). "Allergic sensitization can be induced via multiple physiologic routes in an adjuvant-dependent manner". J. Allergy Clin. Immunol. 128 (6): 1251–1258.e2. doi:10.1016/j.jaci.2011.06.007. PMC 3197891. PMID 21762973.
- Ouyang, Xinshou; Zhang, Ruihua; Yang, Jianjun; Li, Qingshan; Qin, Lihui; Zhu, Chen; Liu, Jianguo; Ning, Huan; Shin, Min Sun (2011). "Transcription factor IRF8 directs a silencing programme for TH17 cell differentiation". Nature Communications. 2 (5): 314. Bibcode:2011NatCo...2..314O. doi:10.1038/ncomms1311. PMC 3112536. PMID 21587231.
