= Manuel González (footballer, born 1929) =

Spanish footballer

Personal information
- Full name: Manuel González Tello
- Date of birth: 21 February 1929
- Place of birth: El Perchel, Spain
- Date of death: 22 September 2013 (aged 84)
- Place of death: Pamplona, Spain
- Height: 1.82 m (5 ft 11 1/2 in)
- Position: Defender

Senior career*
Years	Team	Apps	(Gls)
1950	Murcia	9	(1)
1953–1960	Osasuna	156	(3)
1960	Málaga		
1960	Osasuna	0	(0)
Total		165	(4)
- * Club domestic league appearances and goals

Manuel González Tello (21 February 1929 – 22 September 2013) was a Spanish professional footballer who played as a defender.

== Career ==
González's senior career began with Murcia, making nine appearances and scoring one goal (versus Linense) during the 1949–50 Segunda División season. In 1953, González joined La Liga's Osasuna. He made his professional debut on 13 September during a 2–0 loss to Real Madrid at the Estadio Chamartín. Osasuna were relegated in that campaign, remaining in tier two until 1956 when González scored once in twenty-nine fixtures as Osasuna won the 1955–56 title. He subsequently featured ninety-nine times and netted twice in four future seasons in La Liga. González had a short spell with Málaga in 1960.

After leading Málaga to the 1960 Tercera División trophy, he returned to Osasuna later that year. The final match of his career was a 1960–61 Copa del Generalísimo tie with Extremadura in October 1960. González died in September 2013 in Pamplona, aged 84.

== Career statistics ==
Club statistics
Club	Season	League			Cup (Note: Includes the Copa del Rey)		League Cup		Continental		Other		Total	
Club	Season	Division	Apps	Goals	Apps	Goals	Apps	Goals	Apps	Goals	Apps	Goals	Apps	Goals
Murcia	1949–50	Segunda División	9	1	0	0	—		—		0	0	9	1
Osasuna	1953–54	La Liga	28	0	0	0	—		—		0	0	28	0
Osasuna	1954–55	Segunda División	0	0	0	0	—		—		0	0	0	0
Osasuna	1955–56	Segunda División	29	1	4	0	—		—		0	0	33	1
Osasuna	1956–57	La Liga	28	1	1	0	—		—		0	0	29	1
Osasuna	1957–58	La Liga	27	0	2	0	—		—		0	0	29	0
Osasuna	1958–59	La Liga	29	1	2	0	—		—		0	0	31	1
Osasuna	1959–60	La Liga	15	0	0	0	—		—		0	0	15	0
Osasuna	1960–61	Segunda División	0	0	1	0	—		—		0	0	1	0
Osasuna	Total		156	3	10	0	—		—		0	0	166	3
Career total			165	4	10	0	—		—		0	0	175	4

== Honours ==
Osasuna

- Segunda División: 1955–56
