= Ronnie Clark =

Scottish footballer

Personal information
- Full name: Ronald Clark
- Date of birth: 21 May 1932
- Place of birth: Clarkston, Scotland
- Date of death: 13 September 2013 (aged 81)
- Place of death: Dumfries, Scotland
- Position: Left winger

Senior career*
Years	Team	Apps	(Gls)
1951–1956	Kilmarnock	16	(3)
1956–1958	Gillingham	33	(6)
1958–1959	Oldham Athletic	4	(0)
- Bedford Town
- * Club domestic league appearances and goals

Ronald Clark (21 May 1932 – 13 September 2013) was a Scottish professional footballer. He played as a left winger.

Clark started his career at the Scottish club Kilmarnock in 1951. He played only 16 matches in a five-year spell at the club, scoring three goals. He moved to Gillingham in 1956, where he had much more of an opportunity to play After spending two seasons at the club, playing 33 three matches and scoring 6 goals, Clark transferred to Oldham Athletic. In 1959, having made only four appearances for Oldham, he then transferred to Bedford Town.
