= Bernard Corboz =

Bernard Corboz (2 April 1948 – 24 September 2013) was a Swiss judge who served as the vice-president of the Federal Supreme Court of Switzerland from 2005 to 2006.

Corboz was elected to the Supreme Court in 1988.
