= Johannes van Dam =

Dutch journalist (1946–2013)

Johannes van Dam (9 October 1946 in Amsterdam – 18 September 2013 in Amsterdam) was a Dutch journalist and the country's best-known writer on food. Van Dam wrote a regular column on food for the national daily Het Parool for almost 25 years.

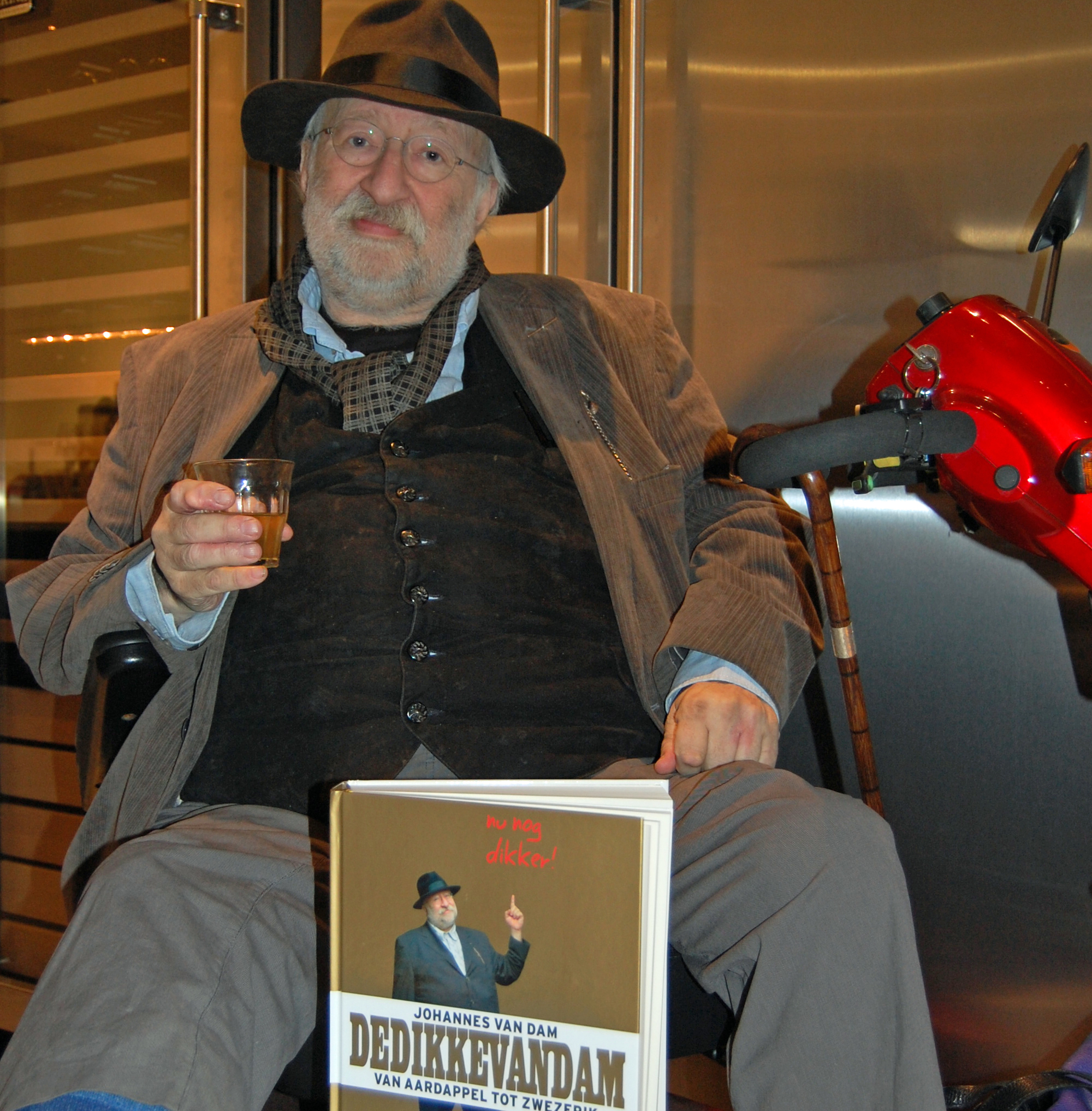
Johannes van dam

Van Dam studied medicine and psychology and worked in the newspaper business from 1967 to 1981 (for Het Vrije Volk and Haagse Post), before running a cookbook store in Amsterdam, in 1983. In 1986 he started writing a column on food for the Dutch weekly Elsevier, and in 1989 sold the bookstore and began writing full-time, for Het Parool and the Belgian daily De Morgen in addition to Elsevier. He published a book on food, De Dikke Van Dam, in 2005. He died in an Amsterdam hospital in 2013 after suffering for some time from health problems, including diabetes. His biography, written by Jeroen Thijssen, was published on November 9, 2018.
