= Carré (surname) =

Carré is a surname. Notable people with the surname include:

- Albert Carré (1852–1938), French theatre director, opera director, actor, librettist; nephew of Michel Carré
- Ambroise-Marie Carré, French Roman Catholic priest, writer and member of the French Academy
- Antoine Carré (politician) (born 1943), French politician
- Antoine Carré (guitarist), French baroque guitarist and composer
- Cyrille Carré (born 1984), French sprint canoeist
- Désiré Carré (1923–2014), French footballer
- Fabrice Carré (1855–1921), French playwright and librettist
- Ferdinand Carré (1824–1900), French engineer
- Géraldine Carré (1969–2024), French journalist and television presenter
- Hendrik Carré (1656–1721), Dutch Golden Age painter
- Hervé Carré (born 1944), French economist
- Isabelle Carré (born 1971), French actress
- Jean-Michel Carré, French television director
- Jean Nicolas Louis Carré (1770–1845), French general
- John le Carré (1931–2020), pseudonym of English writer David John Moore Cornwell
- Juliette Carré (1933–2023), French actress
- Lilli Carré (born 1983), American cartoonist
- Louis Carré (1925–2002), Belgian footballer and manager
- Louis Carré (art dealer) (1897–1977), French art dealer
- Louis Carré (mathematician) (1663–1711), French mathematician
- Marie Carré (died 1984), French nun and conspiracy theorist
- Mathilde Carré, French World War II spy and double agent
- Michel Carré (1821–1872), French librettist
- Michel Carré (director) (1865–1945), French actor and film director
- Olivier Carré (born 1961), French politician
- Pierre-Marie Carré (born 1947), French Roman Catholic bishop
- Roger Carré (1921–1996), French footballer
- Jim Carrey (born 1962), Canadian-American actor, whose surname was anglicized from 'Carré'

== See also ==
- Carré (disambiguation)
- Carle, surnames
- Carle (given name)
- Carree (name)
- Carry (name)
