= 1952–53 in Belgian football =

Football in Belgium
- Season: 1952–53

The 1952–53 season was the 50th season of competitive football in Belgium. RFC Liégeois won their 5th Division I title. This was the first season since the 1952 reform of the national competitions. A new level of football was introduced at the top of the league system. The divisions were also renamed, with the top level being named Division I (one league of 16 teams), the second level Division II (one league of 16 teams), the 3rd level Division III (2 leagues of 16 teams each) and the lowest level remaining the Promotion (4 leagues of 16 teams each). The Belgium national football team played 6 friendly games (3 wins, 3 losses) and then started their 1954 FIFA World Cup qualification campaign with 2 away wins in Finland and Sweden.

== Overview ==
At the end of the season, RRC de Gand and Beringen FC were relegated to Division II and were replaced in Division I by 2 clubs from Lier: Division II winner K Lyra and runner-up K Lierse SK.
The bottom 2 clubs in Division II (FC Renaisien and Stade Louvain) were relegated to Division III, while both Division III winners (K Tubantia FC and R Uccle Sport) qualified for Division II.
The bottom club of each Division III league were relegated to Promotion: Helzold FC, K Mol Sport, RAA Louviéroise and Union Halloise, to be replaced by K Sint-Niklaasse SK, RCS La Forestoise, SRU Verviers and K Willebroekse SV.

== National team ==
Date	Venue	Opponents	Score*	Comp	Belgium scorers
October 19, 1952	Bosuilstadion, Antwerp (H)	The Netherlands	2-1	F	Léopold Anoul, Joseph Mermans
November 26, 1952	Wembley Stadium, London (A)	England	0-5	F
December 25, 1952	Stade Olympique, Colombes (A)	France	1-0	F	Jean Straetmans
March 19, 1953	Camp de Les Corts, Barcelona (A)	Spain	1-3	F	Victor Lemberechts
April 19, 1953	Olympic Stadium, Amsterdam (A)	The Netherlands	2-0	F	Henri Coppens, Augustin Janssens
May 14, 1953	Heysel Stadium, Brussels (H)	Yugoslavia	1-3	F	Léopold Anoul
May 25, 1953	Helsinki Olympic Stadium, Helsinki (A)	Finland	4-2	WCQ	Henri Coppens (3), Léopold Anoul
May 28, 1953	Råsunda Stadium, Stockholm (A)	Sweden	3-2	WCQ	Léopold Anoul, Jean Straetmans, Victor Lemberechts

* Belgium score given first

Key

- H = Home match
- A = Away match
- N = On neutral ground
- F = Friendly
- WCQ = World Cup qualification
- o.g. = own goal

== Honours ==
Competition	Winner
Division I	RFC Liégeois
Division II	K Lyra
Division III	K Tubantia FC and R Uccle Sport
Promotion	K Sint-Niklaasse SK, RCS La Forestoise, SRU Verviers and K Willebroekse SV

== Final league tables ==
=== Premier Division ===
Top scorer: Henri Coppens (R Beerschot AC) with 35 goals.
