= History of the Belgium national football team =

The history of the Belgium national football team officially dates back to their first international in 1904. The Royal Belgian Football Association, which governs the team, co-founded the international governing bodies FIFA (in 1910) and UEFA (in 1954). As of 2026, Belgium has qualified for fifteen FIFA World Cups and seven UEFA European Championships (including an automatical qualification as co-hosts in 2000). In the periods of 1920 to 1938, 1970 to 2002, and since 2014, Belgium participated in many international tournaments, including three Olympic football tournaments in the 1920s. So far, the national side is considered to have had two golden generations: one in the 1980s and early 1990s, and one since the mid 2010s.

== Timeline ==
=== Spread of football in Belgium (1860–99) ===
Belgium was the first mainland European country to play association football, after the Irish student Cyril B. Morrogh walked with a leather ball into the Josephites College of Melle on 26 October 1863. British teachers helped to popularise the sport in schools. Initially, association football was an elitist pastime, but over the following decades, it supplanted rugby as the most popular national football sport. In 1895, the national athletics sports union was founded, predecessor of the later national football association, under the name UBSSA (Union Belge des Sociétés de Sports Athlétiques); the UBSSA organised the first league in Belgian football in 1896.

=== Birth of a national team (1900–04) ===
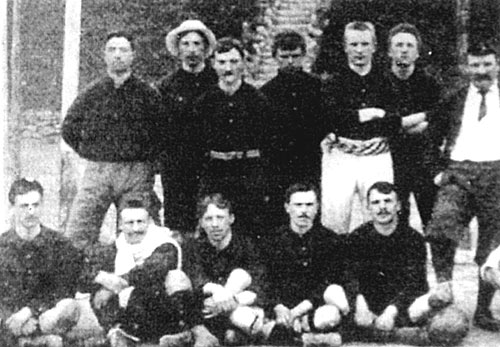
The Belgian team before making their international debut against France, on 1 May 1904

On 11 October 1900, Beerschot Athletic Club president of honour Jorge Díaz announced that Antwerp would host a series of challenge matches between Europe's best football teams. The prize was the Coupe Vanden Abeele, a cup offered by the Antwerp football director Frédéric Vanden Abeele. After some organizational difficulties, on 28 April 1901, Beerschot's pitch hosted its first tournament, in which a Belgian selection faced a Dutch team made up of players from third-level sides led by ex-footballer Cees van Hasselt. Naturally, the hosts had little trouble claiming the cup, defeating the Netherlands by 8–0. As a result of the games not being sanctioned by the Royal Dutch Football Association (KNVB), only players from the second division were available to Van Hasselt, so Belgium also won the next matches, although with more leveled scores (1–0, 2–1, 6–4). However these results were not recognized by FIFA since the Belgian team contained some English players, such as Herbert Potts, who scored 12 of "Belgium's" 17 goals.

On 1 May 1904, the Belgian team played their first official game, against France at the Stade Vivier d'Oie ("Goose Pond Stadium") in Uccle. The game was attended by 1,500 spectators and ended in a 3–3 draw, leaving neither side in possession of the Évence Coppée Trophy. Twenty days later, the Belgian and French football associations joined five other national teams in founding the International Federation of Association Football, or FIFA. At that time, Belgium's national squad was chosen by a committee of representatives from the country's six or seven main clubs.

=== Early days (1905–19) ===
Belgium would play twice a year against the Netherlands beginning from 1905 onwards, generally once in Antwerp and once in Rotterdam. From these beginnings until 1925, Belgian-Dutch cup trophies would be awarded in the "Low Countries derby".

After a 1905 match, a Dutch reporter wrote that three Belgian footballers "work[ed] as devils". A year later, journalist Pierre Walckiers nicknamed the team The Red Devils, inspired by their team colours and that year's achievement of three consecutive victories, a 0–5 win versus France and 5–0 and 2–3 wins against the Netherlands. In his match report for the last game in the UBSSA magazine La Vie Sportive, Walckiers called the players petits diables rouges ("little red devils").

In 1910, former Scottish footballer William Maxwell was assigned as first manager of the Red Devils. Under his charge, Alphonse Six made his international début; Six was one of Belgium's greatest players in the prewar period and regarded as the most skillful attacker outside the British Isles. Since 1912, UBSSA began governing football only and was renamed UBSFA. (Note: UBSFA was the acronym for the organisation's French name: Union Belge des Sociétés de Football-Association. In 1920 it received the title of "Royal Union" for its 25th year of existence, and hence became the Royal Belgian Football Association.) International football was largely suspended during the First World War, with no official games hosted or played between 1915 and 1918. During the war, the national team only played unrecognised friendlies in and against France. Regrettably, three Belgian international players died in the war.

=== 6 major interwar tournaments (1920–39) ===
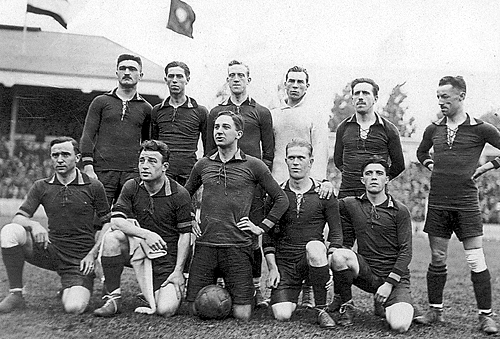
Belgium's 1920 Olympic champions before the final

In 1920 at their first official Olympic appearance, the Red Devils won the gold medal on home soil after a controversial final in which their opponents Czechoslovakia left the pitch. While their results in the three Summer Olympics of the 1920s were meritorious (four wins in seven games), the team lost every match of their three FIFA World Cup participations in the 1930s. Raymond "Ray" Braine was one of the most talented Belgian players in the 1920s–1930s era, winning eight club titles and becoming four times top scorer in the Belgian and Czechoslovak first divisions.

=== World War II (1940–45) ===
International football tournaments were suspended in most of the 1940s following the outbreak of World War Two. With exception of one game in 1944 against France, the national football team ceased its official activities. The traditional derby against the Netherlands was kept alive in the wartime, with many unofficial games against them.

=== Little success in afterwar decades (1945–69) ===
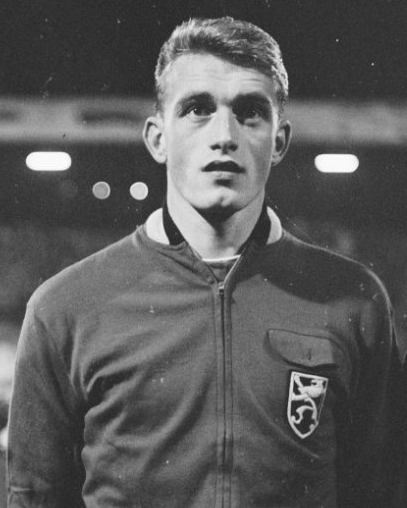
Paul Van Himst is considered one of Belgium's best players ever.

Belgium's gifted players in the 1940s and 1950s included attackers Henri "Rik" Coppens, Joseph "Jef" Mermans and Léopold "Pol" Anoul, and centre back Louis Carré.

Belgium qualified for one out of eight major tournaments in the 1950s and 1960s only, the 1954 World Cup in Switzerland. One day before the 1954 World Cup commenced, the RBFA co-founded the European football federation UEFA after consultation with the existing French and Italian associations. According to journalist Henry Guldemont, some of his Swiss colleagues regarded the 1954 Belgian team as "favourites for the world title" after a promising 4–4 opener against England. However, in the second and last group match against Italy, Belgium was defeated 1–4 and was unable to proceed to the knockout rounds. In 1958 FIFA World Cup qualification, as runner-up in UEFA Group 2, Belgium were then drawn as lucky loser to play off against Israel but declined. Two encouraging results in these decades were the two home wins against reigning world champions: 2–0 versus Germany in 1954 and 5–1 against Brazil in 1963. In between, Belgium also defeated Hungary's Golden Team, with a remarkable 5–4 result in 1956. Such performances in friendly matches delivered the Belgian squad the dubious nickname "world champion of the friendlies", as Pelé testified.

=== Resurrection and first Euro finals (1970–78) ===
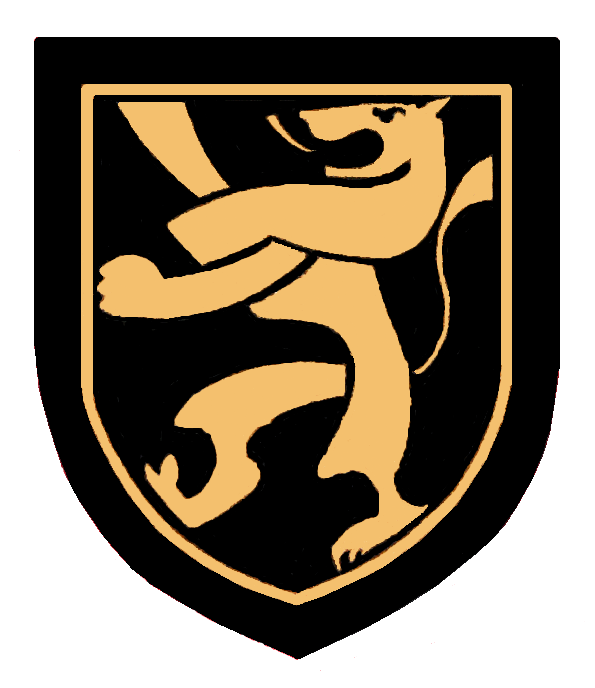
1948–1980 Belgium lion emblem

The team's prospects improved in the early 1970s. Under Raymond Goethals, Belgium obtained their first wins at World and European Championships (in 1970 and 1972, respectively). The Euro 1972 tournament, in which they finished third, was their first appearance at the European Championships. The period was also the glory days of four-time Belgian Golden Shoe and Belgian joint-topscorer Paul Van Himst, later elected Belgium's Golden Player between 1954 and 2004. After 1972, the next three attempts to qualify for a major tournament were all in vain. In their qualifiers for the 1974 FIFA World Cup they became the only national team to miss out on the World Cup without ever conceding a goal, as they finished behind rivals Netherlands on goal difference. Since the 1970s a key strength of the Belgian team became its systematic use of the offside trap, a defensive tactic developed in the 1960s at Anderlecht under French coach Pierre Sinibaldi.

==== Belgium League XI ====
In the early 1970s, a selection of the best players in the Belgian First Division played some matches against selections of other countries' top divisions (among others two against Italy's National League team). The squad featured mainly Belgian international football players and just like the Belgium national team at that time it was also managed by Raymond Goethals, but it was no proper national team as some foreigners were included as well. The Dutch sports columnist and former Anderlecht striker Jan Mulder wrote about his unique experience as "half Red Devil", when he was selected for a home match of the Belgian League XI against the Italian League team on 15 December 1971. Mulder was warmly welcomed in the group by Goethals with knocks on the chest and the words "You can do it, strong Hollander, you can do it, kicking the Italianer knockout!". After he made the 2–1 winning goal in the 84th minute, the trainer embraced him and shouted multiple times "Haven't I said it!".

=== Golden Generation (1978–2002) ===
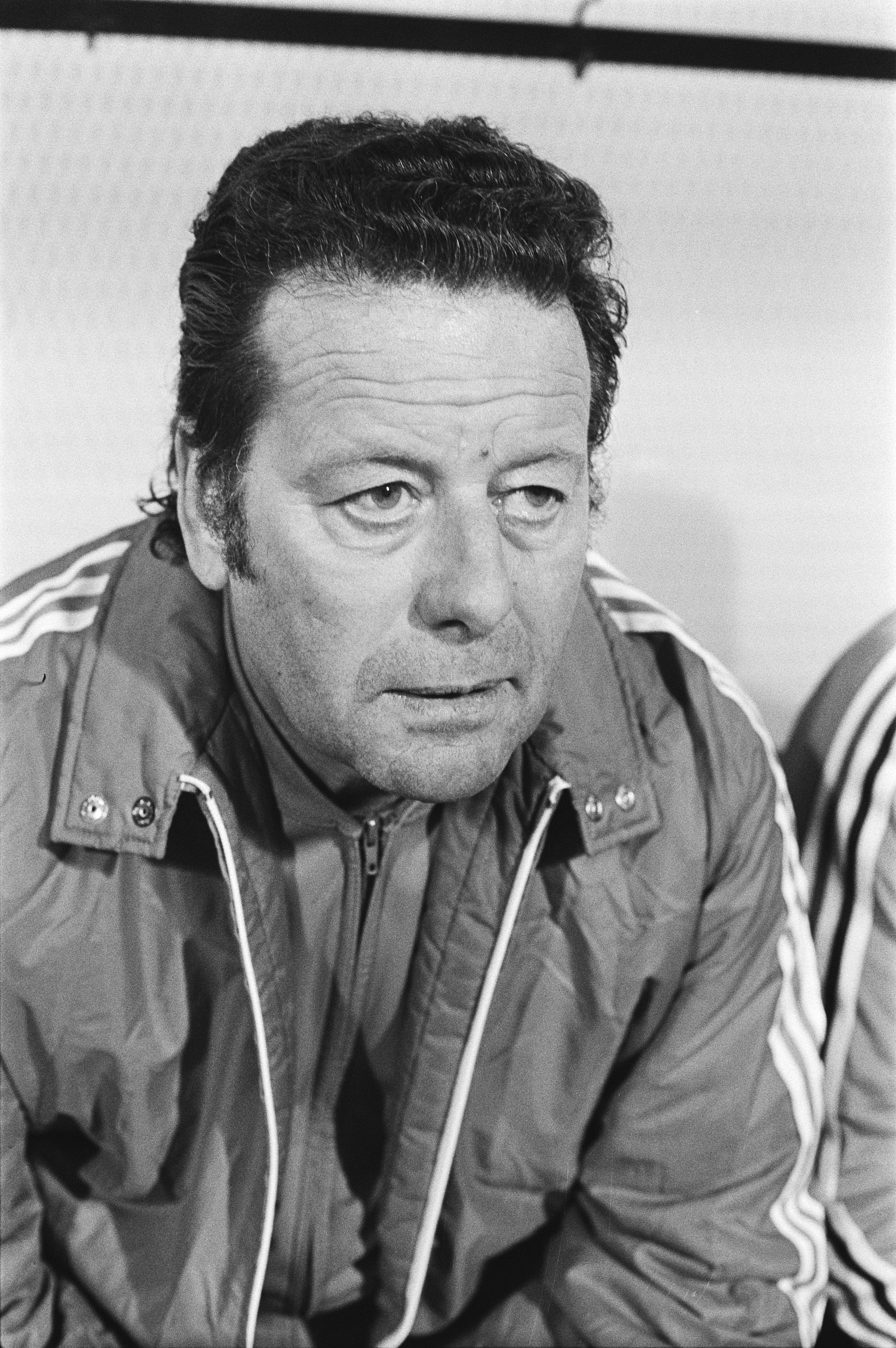
Under Guy Thys, Belgium reached the Euro 1980 final and the 1986 World Cup semifinals.

Belgium's most successful period started when they finished second in the UEFA Euro 1980. The 1980s and early 1990s are generally considered the first golden age of the national team. Under the leadership of Guy Thys, who coached more than 100 official games, they established a reputation of being a physical, well-organized team that was difficult to play against.

Between 1982 and 2002, Belgium qualified for every FIFA World Cup, and in most World Cups they also made it to the second round. After Thys, also managers Paul Van Himst and Robert Waseige guided a national selection past the first round. In the opening game of the 1982 tournament, the team achieved a surprising 0–1 win over reigning world champions Argentina. Apart from FIFA recognitions for individual players, the team as a collective reached the semifinals in 1986. While the World Cups of 1990 and 1994 were reached directly, the national squad had to struggle through play-off rounds again to qualify for the 1998 and 2002 World Cups. In 2002, prior to the World Cup of that year, Belgium achieved a 1–2 away win against title defenders France. After the Euro 1980 final, Belgium did not convince anymore at the continental level, with early exits in their two appearances at the UEFA Euro 1984 and UEFA Euro 2000 tournaments respectively. In the late 1990s they played three friendly tournaments in Morocco, Cyprus and Japan, and in the last they shared the 1999 Kirin Cup with Peru.

The team's rigorous organization was reinforced by several world-class players such as goalkeepers Jean-Marie Pfaff and Michel Preud'homme, right-back Eric Gerets, midfielders Jan Ceulemans and Franky Van der Elst, playmaker Enzo Scifo and striker Luc Nilis, all of whom had retired from international football by 2000. Pfaff, Ceulemans and Van der Elst appeared in Pelé's selection of 125 greatest living footballers in 2004. After the 2002 World Cup, also other valuable players in their thirties stopped playing with the national side, including Marc Wilmots and Gert Verheyen. Coach Waseige left as well, creating a place for Aimé Anthuenis.

=== Decline (2002–2011) ===
Belgium did not reach Portugal's Euro 2004, and after failing to qualify for the FIFA World Cup for the first time since 1978, the contract of national coach Aimé Anthuenis was not renewed beyond 2005. René Vandereycken was appointed to replace Anthuenis in January 2006, but the performances of the team did not improve and they slipped to an all-time low 71st position in the FIFA World Rankings in June 2007. After failing to qualify for Euro 2008 and a generally poor performance in the 2010 FIFA World Cup qualifiers, where Belgium ended fourth in their group (two places below the play-off spot), coach Vandereycken was sacked in April 2009. His assistant Franky Vercauteren would take over ad interim.

In the meantime, a promising new generation appeared to arise as Belgium's U-21 selection qualified for the 2008 Summer Olympics in 2007, and the Young Red Devils squad placed fourth at Beijing 2008. These young players, many of which would grow into the senior national team, were characterized by mostly defensive skills and also a strong midfield. Yet, their appearance in the senior team did not result in immediate success. After a 2–1 loss against Armenia in September 2009, interim-coach Vercauteren resigned and made way for new coach Dick Advocaat. However, in April 2010, after only six months at the helm, Advocaat resigned as manager of Belgium amid speculation that he was to become coach of Russia. Georges Leekens was announced as his successor in May 2010, signing a contract until 2012. During Leekens' second term of office (having previously managed Belgium from 1997 to 1999) the Red Devils narrowly missed the Euro 2012 play-offs.

=== Beginning of renewal (2012–present) ===
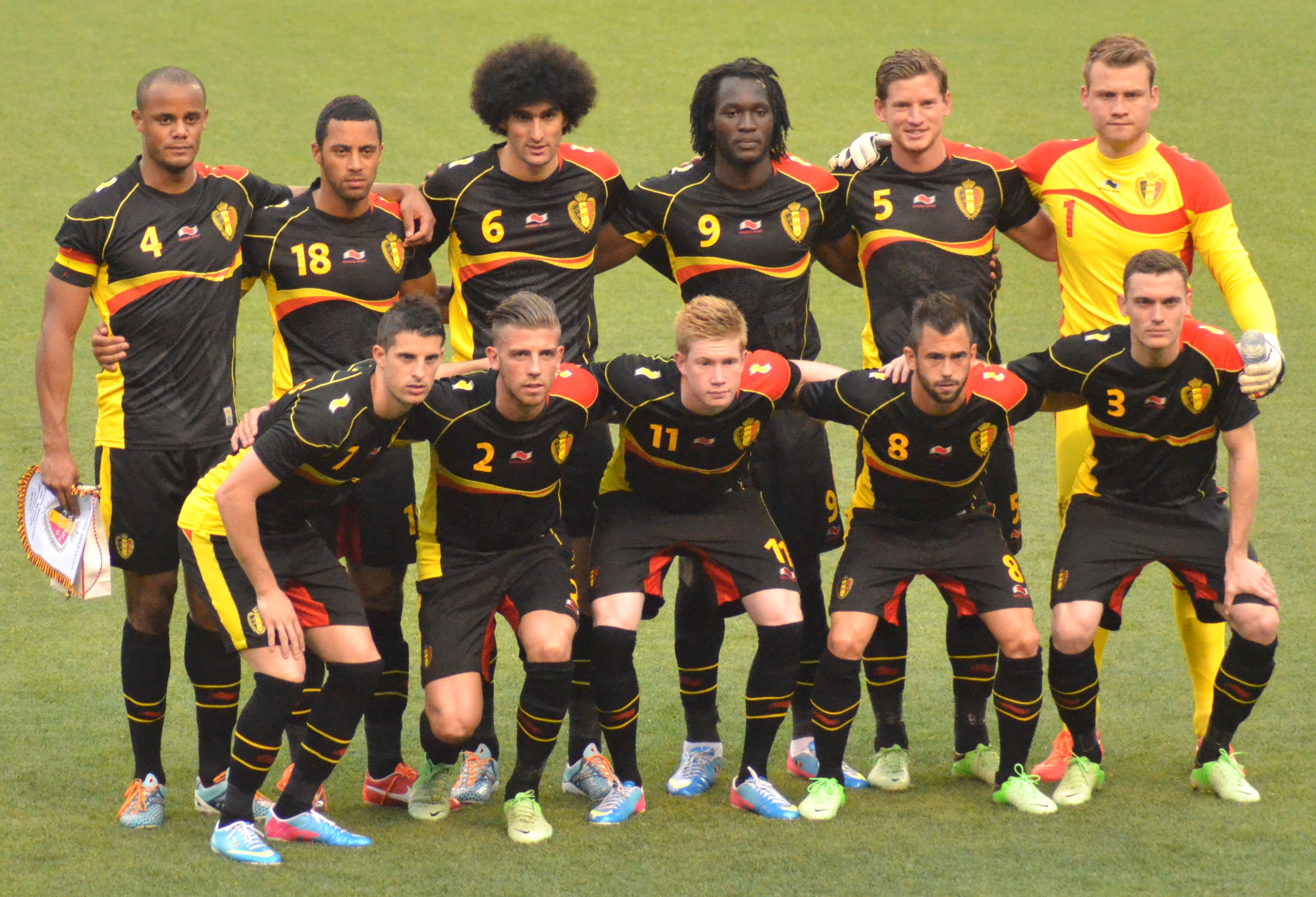
The Belgian team in 2013

Leekens left in May 2012 and signed for Club Brugge, stating his work was 90% completed. Assistant manager Marc Wilmots (assistant since 2009) was asked to replace Leekens and under his reign, the team improved, rising to a high of fifth on the FIFA World Rankings in October 2013. By 2013, several foreign media regarded this Belgium national side during the 2014 World Cup qualifiers as a new golden generation. Belgium had a broad potential to create chances, mainly with players such as attackers Kevin Mirallas, Christian Benteke and Romelu Lukaku, as well as midfielders Marouane Fellaini, Axel Witsel, Mousa Dembélé, Kevin De Bruyne and Eden Hazard. The solid defence has also been well noticed with outfield players such as Vincent Kompany, Thomas Vermaelen, Toby Alderweireld and Jan Vertonghen as well as the goalkeepers Thibaut Courtois and Simon Mignolet. Coach Wilmots was credited with "not only giving the young group confidence in themselves as well as enjoying a close relationship with his players but also at the same time being capable of instilling discipline to the squad". Belgium finally qualified as group winners after 8 wins and 2 draws. At the 2014 World Cup finals, the young and internationally less experienced squad continued its success by managing a streak of four wins, earning a spot for Belgium in the quarter-finals for only the second time in its history. This result is eclipsed only by the fourth place acquired in 1986.

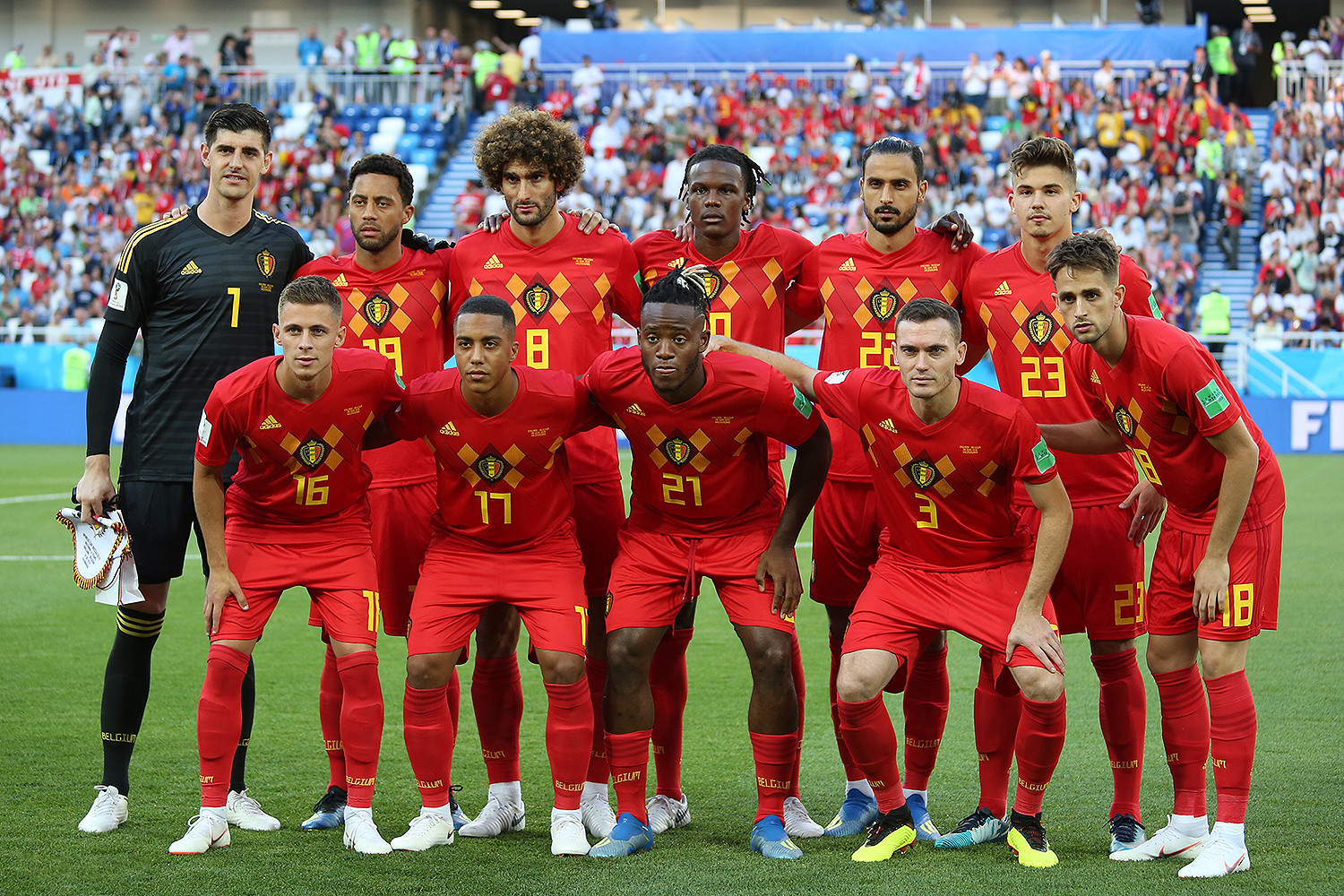
The Belgian football team at the group phase of the FIFA World Cup 2018

In June 2014, Wilmots prolonged his managerial contract until 2018 (including the World Cup in Russia). Players such as Adnan Januzaj, Divock Origi, Radja Nainggolan and Michy Batshuayi added up to the offensive potential of his squad. The team reached several more FIFA rank records during this period, reaching for the first time fourth in October 2014, third in April 2015 and second in June 2015. Belgium qualified for Euro 2016 with a match to spare in October 2015, resulting in the first position in the FIFA World Rankings in November 2015. In the 2018 World Cup qualifying allocation, they were seeded first in their group.

== Kit history ==
=== Kit sponsorship ===
Kit Supplier	Period	Notes
Umbro	Early 1970s	
Adidas	1974–1980	
Admiral	1981–1982	
Adidas	1982–1991	
Diadora	1992–1999	
Nike	1999–2010	
Burrda	2010–2014	
Adidas	2014–present	

=== Kit evolution ===
Throughout the footballing nation's sartorial history, the outfield players wore home equipments with the following colour patterns:

1901 (unofficial) - -	1904, 1905–1957 -	1904–1905 - -	1958–1970; 2015–2017 -	1970–1979* - -	1980, 2006–2010 -	1981–2006, 2010–2015, 2017–

* In 1970, the all-white away combination also started getting used in home games; in the rest of the decade it was systematically worn.

== See also ==
- Évence Coppée Trophy
- Belgium at the FIFA World Cup
- Belgium at the UEFA European Championship
- Colours of the Belgium national football team
