= 1953–54 in Belgian football =

Football in Belgium
- Season: 1953–54

The 1953–54 season was the 51st season of competitive football in Belgium. RSC Anderlechtois won their 5th Division I title. The Belgium national football team qualified for the 1954 FIFA World Cup and was drawn unseeded in Group 4 with the unseeded organizing country Switzerland against which they did not play, and seeded teams England and Italy. The Belgian Cup resumed in 1953–54 with Standard Liège winning in the final against RC Mechelen KM.

== Overview ==
Belgium finished first of Group 2 in the 1954 FIFA World Cup qualification with 7 points, ahead of Sweden (3 points) and Finland (2 points). They thus qualified for the final tournament in Switzerland as one of the 11 European countries. The final tournament consisted of a first round with 4 groups of 4 teams. Belgium was drawn in Group 4. In each group, the 2 seeded teams would play one game against each unseeded team. In case both teams are level after 90 minutes, extra time would be played. In Group 4, England and Italy were the 2 seeded teams and Switzerland and Belgium were unseeded. Belgium and Switzerland thus played 2 games, against England and Italy. Belgium drawn against England after extra time (4-4) and lost to Italy, while Switzerland lost to England (2-0) and beat Italy (2-1). A play-off game was then played between Switzerland and Italy (2 points each) to determine the 2nd qualifying spot for the quarter-finals. Switzerland beat Italy 4–1. Belgium finished last of Group 4 with 1 point.

At the end of the season, R Daring Club de Bruxelles and K Lyra were relegated to Division II and were replaced in Division I by Division II winner K Waterschei SV Thor and runner-up RRC de Bruxelles.
The bottom 2 clubs in Division II (RUS Tournaisienne and K Tubantia FC) were relegated to Division III, while both Division III winners (KFC Izegem and SRU Verviers) qualified for Division II.
The bottom 2 clubs of each Division III league were relegated to the Promotion: Rupel SK, K Olse Merksem SC, K Winterslag FC and R Herve FC. to be replaced by RRFC Montegnée, RFC Bressoux, RAA Louviéroise and KSV Waregem from Promotion.

== National team ==
Date	Venue	Opponents	Score*	Comp	Belgium scorers
September 23, 1953	Heysel Stadium, Brussels (H)	Finland	2-2	WCQ	Mathieu Bollen (2)
October 8, 1953	Heysel Stadium, Brussels (H)	Sweden	2-0	WCQ	Henri Coppens, Victor Mees
October 25, 1953	Feijenoord Stadion, Rotterdam (A)	The Netherlands	0-1	F
November 22, 1953	Hardturm, Zürich (A)	Switzerland	2-2	F	Hippolyte Van Den Bosch (2)
March 14, 1954	Heysel Stadium, Brussels (H)	Portugal	0-0	F
April 4, 1954	Bosuilstadion, Antwerp (H)	The Netherlands	4-0	F	Joseph Mermans, Henri Coppens (2), Rinus Terlouw (o.g.)
May 9, 1954	Stadion Maksimir, Zagreb (A)	Yugoslavia	2-0	F	Henri Coppens, Joseph Mermans
May 30, 1954	Heysel Stadium, Brussels (H)	France	3-3	F	Joseph Mermans, Léopold Anoul (2)
June 17, 1954	St. Jakob-Park, Basel (N)	England	4-4 (aet)	WCFR	Léopold Anoul (2), Henri Coppens, Jimmy Dickinson (o.g.)
June 20, 1954	Cornaredo Stadium, Lugano (N)	Italy	1-4	WCFR	Léopold Anoul

* Belgium score given first

Key

- H = Home match
- A = Away match
- N = On neutral ground
- F = Friendly
- WCQ = World Cup qualification
- WCFR = World Cup first round
- o.g. = own goal
- aet = after extra time

== Honours ==
Competition	Winner
Division I	RSC Anderlechtois
Cup	Standard Liège
Division II	K Waterschei SV Thor
Division III	KFC Izegem and SRU Verviers
Promotion	RRFC Montegnée, RFC Bressoux, RAA Louviéroise and KSV Waregem

== Final league tables ==
=== Premier Division ===
Top scorer: Hippolyte Van Den Bosch (RSC Anderlechtois) with 29 goals.
