= Belgium at the FIFA World Cup =

International football delegation

Belgium national football team at the 2026 FIFA World Cup in the United States

Belgium have appeared in the finals tournament of the FIFA World Cup on 15 occasions, the first being at the first FIFA World Cup in 1930 where they finished in 11th place and played the first ever World Cup match against the United States. The inaugural FIFA World Cup final was officiated by the Belgian referee John Langenus.

Traditionally, Belgium's greatest rival is the Netherlands. The two countries have met each other twice in the history of the FIFA World Cup, with one win for Belgium (USA 1994) and one draw (France 1998). The team that has played the most against Belgium in the finals is the continuum USSR/Russia: five times, with three victories for Belgium and two for the Soviet Union.

Belgium's best finish in the World Cup is third, at the 2018 tournament in Russia. Belgium previously finished fourth in the 1986 edition in Mexico.

Belgium's first World Cup match in 1930, against the United States

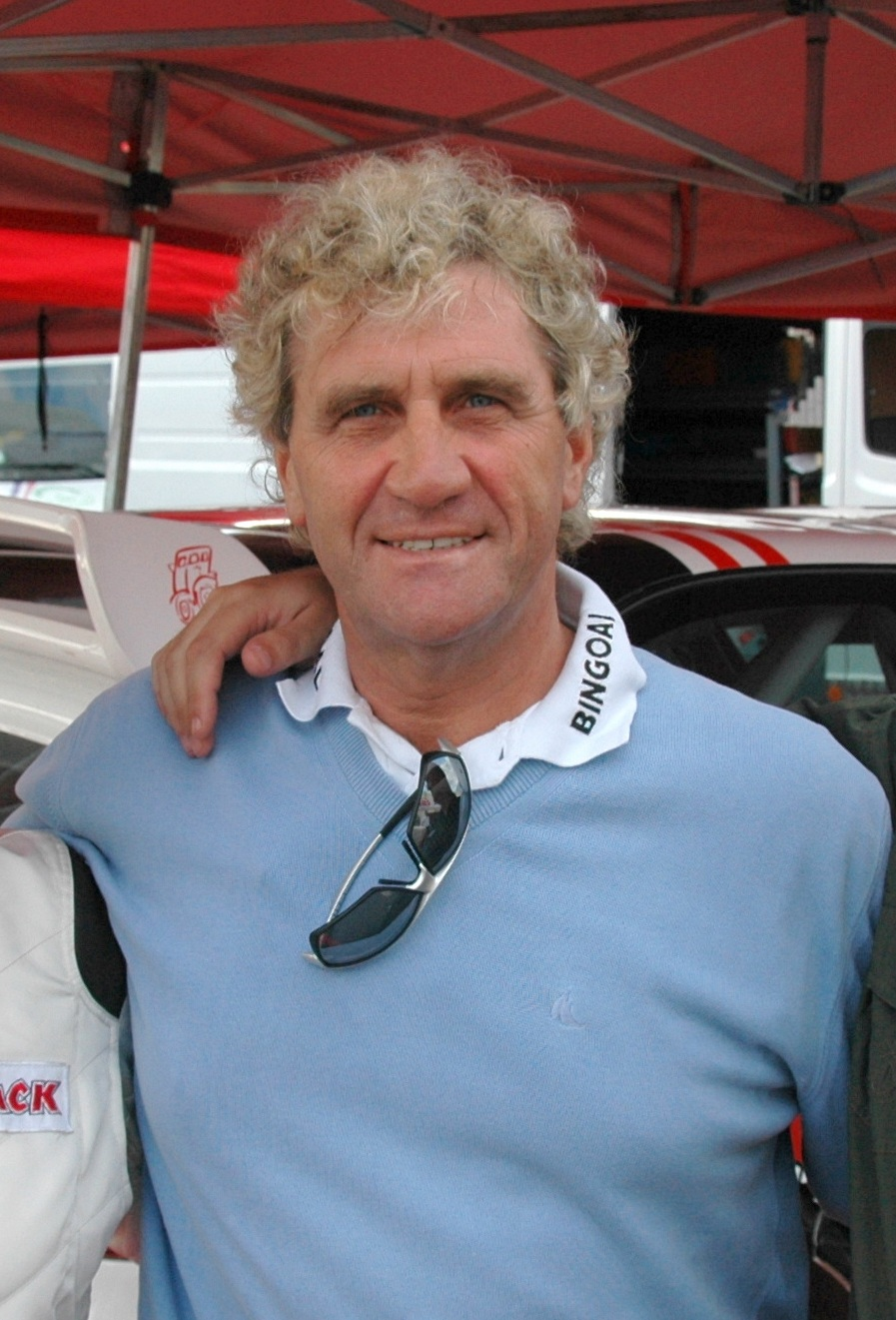
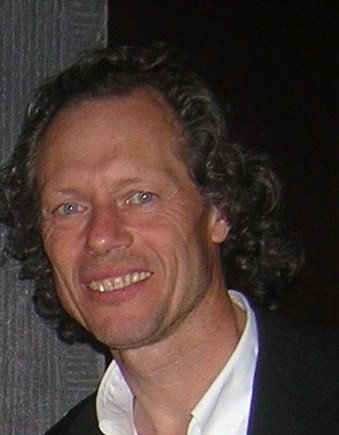
In their golden era, Belgium featured two goalkeepers who were named the best at that position in the World Cup; Jean-Marie Pfaff (left) in 1986 and Michel Preud'homme (right) in 1994.

== FIFA World Cup record ==
Belgian's first five appearances at the FIFA World Cup between 1930 and 1970 were not successful, as they failed to advance beyond the first round. After two scoreless defeats at the inaugural World Cup in 1930, Belgium scored their first two World Cup goals in 1934 against Germany, by virtue of Bernard Voorhoof. However, both in 1934 and 1938 the Red Devils went out with a single loss. In 1954 they held England to a draw (4–4) and in 1970 they achieved their first World Cup win, against El Salvador (3–0).

Belgium qualified for six successive World Cups from 1982 to 2002, and reached the second phase in five of these tournaments. Their fourth-place finish in the 1986 was the best placing in their World Cup history until 2018, when they finished third after beating England 2–0 in Saint Petersburg.

=== 1930 FIFA World Cup ===
Pos	Team	Pld	W	D	L	GF	GA	GD	Pts	Qualification
1	United States	2	2	0	0	6	0	+6	4	Advance to the knockout stage
2	Paraguay	2	1	0	1	1	3	−2	2	
3	Belgium	2	0	0	2	0	4	−4	0	

Source: ESPN
13 July 1930
15:00 UYT (UTC−03:30)

United States	3–0	Belgium
McGhee 23'; Florie 45'; Patenaude 69'	Report

Estadio Parque Central, Montevideo
Attendance: 10,000
Referee: José Macías (Argentina)

20 July 1930
15:00 UYT (UTC−03:30)

Paraguay	1–0	Belgium
Vargas Peña 40'	Report

Estadio Centenario, Montevideo
Attendance: 900
Referee: Ricardo Vallarino (Uruguay)

=== 1934 FIFA World Cup ===
The group stage used in the first World Cup was discarded in favour of a straight knockout tournament.

27 May 1934
16:30 (CEST)

Germany	5 – 2	Belgium
Kobierski 25'; Siffling 49'; Conen 66', 70', 87'	Report	Voorhoof 29', 43'

Stadio Giovanni Berta, Florence
Attendance: ~8,000
Referee: Francesco Mattea (Italy)

=== 1938 FIFA World Cup ===
5 June 1938
17:00 (WEST)

France	3–1	Belgium
Veinante 1'; Nicolas 16', 69'	Report	Isemborghs 38'

Stade Olympique de Colombes, Paris
Attendance: 30,454
Referee: Hans Wüthrich (Switzerland)

=== 1954 FIFA World Cup ===
According to journalist Henry Guldemont, some of his Swiss colleagues regarded the 1954 Belgian team as "favourites for the world title" after a promising 4–4 opener against England. However, in the second and last group match against Italy, Belgium was defeated 1–4 and was unable to proceed to the finals.

Pos	Team	Pld	W	D	L	GF	GA	GD	Pts	Qualification
1	England	2	1	1	0	6	4	+2	3	Advance to the knockout stage
2	Switzerland	2	1	0	1	2	3	−1	2 (Note: Second place decided over through play-off: Switzerland 4–1 Italy)	Advance to the knockout stage
3	Italy	2	1	0	1	5	3	+2	2	
4	Belgium	2	0	1	1	5	8	−3	1	

Source: FIFA
Notes:
17 June 1954
18:10 (CET)

England	4–4 (a.e.t.)	Belgium
Broadis 26', 63'; Lofthouse 36', 91'	Report	Anoul 5', 71'; Coppens 67'; Dickinson 94' (o.g.)

St. Jakob Stadium, Basel
Attendance: 40,000
Referee: Emil Schmetzer (West Germany)

20 June 1954
17:00 (CET)

Italy	4–1	Belgium
Pandolfini 41' (pen.); Galli 48'; Frignani 58'; Lorenzi 78'	Report	Anoul 81'

Cornaredo Stadium, Lugano
Attendance: 26,000
Referee: Carl Erich Steiner (Austria)

=== 1970 FIFA World Cup ===
Pos	Team	Pld	W	D	L	GF	GA	GD	Pts	Qualification
1	Soviet Union	3	2	1	0	6	1	+5	5 (Note: Having finished level on both points and goal difference, the Soviet Union and Mexico were separated by the drawing of lots.)	Advance to knockout stage
2	Mexico	3	2	1	0	5	0	+5	5	Advance to knockout stage
3	Belgium	3	1	0	2	4	5	−1	2	
4	El Salvador	3	0	0	3	0	9	−9	0	

Source: FIFA
Notes:
3 June 1970
16:00

Belgium	3–0	El Salvador
Van Moer 12', 54'; Lambert 76' (pen.)	Report

Estadio Azteca, Mexico City
Attendance: 92,205
Referee: Andrei Rădulescu (Romania)

6 June 1970
16:00

Soviet Union	4–1	Belgium
Byshovets 14', 63'; Asatiani 57'; Khmelnytskyi 76'	Report	Lambert 86'

Estadio Azteca, Mexico City
Attendance: 95,261
Referee: Rudolf Scheurer (Switzerland)

11 June 1970
16:00

Mexico	1–0	Belgium
Peña 14' (pen.)	Report

Estadio Azteca, Mexico City
Attendance: 108,192
Referee: Ángel Norberto Coerezza (Argentina)

=== 1982 FIFA World Cup ===
In the first game of the 1982 World Cup, held at Camp Nou, Belgium celebrated one of their most famous victories: a 1–0 win over the defending champions, Argentina, with a goal by Erwin Vandenbergh. After reaching to the second group stage, Belgium lost 3–0 to Poland after a hat-trick from Zbigniew Boniek. Their last match against the Soviet Union ended in a 1–0 loss.

==== Group 3 ====
Pos	Team	Pld	W	D	L	GF	GA	GD	Pts	Qualification
1	Belgium	3	2	1	0	3	1	+2	5	Advance to second round
2	Argentina	3	2	0	1	6	2	+4	4	Advance to second round
3	Hungary	3	1	1	1	12	6	+6	3	
4	El Salvador	3	0	0	3	1	13	−12	0	

Source: FIFA
13 June 1982
20:00 CEST

Argentina	0–1	Belgium
	Report	Vandenbergh 62'

Camp Nou, Barcelona
Attendance: 95,500
Referee: Vojtěch Christov (Czechoslovakia)

19 June 1982
21:00 CEST

Belgium	1–0	El Salvador
Coeck 19'	Report

Nuevo Estadio, Elche
Attendance: 15,000
Referee: Malcolm Moffat (Northern Ireland)

22 June 1982
21:00 CEST

Belgium	1–1	Hungary
Czerniatynski 76'	Report	Varga 27'

Nuevo Estadio, Elche
Attendance: 37,000
Referee: Clive White (England)

==== Group A ====
Pos	Team	Pld	W	D	L	GF	GA	GD	Pts	Qualification
1	Poland	2	1	1	0	3	0	+3	3	Advance to knockout stage
2	Soviet Union	2	1	1	0	1	0	+1	3	
3	Belgium	2	0	0	2	0	4	−4	0	

Source: FIFA
28 June 1982
21:00 CEST

Poland	3–0	Belgium
Boniek 4', 26', 53'	Report

Camp Nou, Barcelona
Attendance: 65,000
Referee: Luis Paulino Siles (Costa Rica)

1 July 1982
21:00 CEST

Belgium	0–1	Soviet Union
	Report	Oganesian 48'

Camp Nou, Barcelona
Attendance: 45,000
Referee: Michel Vautrot (France)

=== 1986 FIFA World Cup ===
Four years later they achieved their best World Cup run to that point when they placed fourth at Mexico 1986. Qualifying as one best third-placed teams, in the knockout phase Belgium surprisingly won against Soviet Union after extra time (4–3), despite an opposing player, Igor Belanov, scoring a hat-trick. Brazil and Austria are the only other teams to have achieved this in the World Cup (in 1938 and 1954 respectively). Belgium also beat Spain on penalties after a 1–1 draw, but they lost 2–0 to the eventual champions, Argentina, in the semi-finals, with both goals scored by Diego Maradona. In the match for third place Belgium lost to France 4–2 after extra time. Their captain, Jan Ceulemans, and their goalkeeper, Jean-Marie Pfaff, were the first Belgian players to be selected in the All-Star Team of a World Cup. Enzo Scifo was selected as the best young player of the tournament.

Pos	Team	Pld	W	D	L	GF	GA	GD	Pts	Qualification
1	Mexico (H)	3	2	1	0	4	2	+2	5	Advance to knockout stage
2	Paraguay	3	1	2	0	4	3	+1	4	Advance to knockout stage
3	Belgium	3	1	1	1	5	5	0	3	Advance to knockout stage
4	Iraq	3	0	0	3	1	4	−3	0	

Source: FIFA
(H) Hosts
3 June 1986 (first round)
12:00 CST

Belgium	1–2	Mexico
Vandenbergh 45'	Report	Quirarte 23'; Sánchez 39'

Estadio Azteca, Mexico City
Attendance: 110,000
Referee: Carlos Espósito (Argentina)

8 June 1986 (first round)
12:00 CST

Iraq	1–2	Belgium
Radhi 59'	Report	Scifo 16'; Claesen 21' (pen.)

Estadio Nemesio Díez, Toluca
Attendance: 20,000
Referee: Jesús Díaz (Colombia)

11 June 1986 (first round)
12:00 CST

Paraguay	2–2	Belgium
Cabañas 50', 76'	Report	Vercauteren 30'; Veyt 59'

Estadio Nemesio Díez, Toluca
Attendance: 16,000
Referee: Bogdan Dotchev (Bulgaria)

15 June 1986 (second round)
16:00 CST

Soviet Union	3–4 (a.e.t.)	Belgium
Belanov 27', 70', 111' (pen.)	Report	Scifo 56'; Ceulemans 77'; Demol 102'; Claesen 110'

Estadio Nou Camp, León
Attendance: 32,277
Referee: Erik Fredriksson (Sweden)

22 June 1986 (quarter-final)
16:00 CST

Spain	1–1 (a.e.t.)	Belgium
Señor 85'	Report	Ceulemans 35'
Penalties
Señor (penalty scored); Eloy (penalty missed); Chendo (penalty scored); Butragueño (penalty scored); Víctor (penalty scored)	4 – 5	(penalty scored) Claesen; (penalty scored) Scifo; (penalty scored) Broos; (penalty scored) Vervoort; (penalty scored) L. Van der Elst

Estadio Cuauhtémoc, Puebla
Attendance: 45,000
Referee: Siegfried Kirschen (East Germany)

25 June 1986 (semi-final)
16:00 CST

Argentina	2–0	Belgium
Maradona 51', 63'	Report

Estadio Azteca, Mexico City
Attendance: 114,500
Referee: Antonio Márquez Ramírez (Mexico)

28 June 1986 (match for third place)
12:00 CST

France	4–2 (a.e.t.)	Belgium
Ferreri 27'; Papin 43'; Genghini 104'; Amoros 111' (pen.)	Report	Ceulemans 11'; Claesen 73'

Estadio Cuauhtémoc, Puebla
Attendance: 21,000
Referee: George Courtney (England)

=== 1990 FIFA World Cup ===
In the 1990 FIFA World Cup, Belgium survived the group phase by wins against South Korea and Uruguay (2–0 and 3–1). In the second round they did well against England, dominating the match by periods and with Enzo Scifo even hitting the woodwork twice. With a persisting 0–0 penalties seemed unavoidable, but eventually they lost in the last minute of extra time after a "nearly blind" volley by David Platt. Scifo was elected as second best player of the 1990 World Cup after Lothar Matthäus.

Pos	Team	Pld	W	D	L	GF	GA	GD	Pts	Qualification
1	Spain	3	2	1	0	5	2	+3	5	Advance to knockout stage
2	Belgium	3	2	0	1	6	3	+3	4	Advance to knockout stage
3	Uruguay	3	1	1	1	2	3	−1	3	Advance to knockout stage
4	South Korea	3	0	0	3	1	6	−5	0	

Source: FIFA
Rules for classification: Group stage tiebreakers
12 June 1990
17:00

Belgium	2–0	South Korea
Degryse 53'; De Wolf 64'	Report

Stadio Marc'Antonio Bentegodi, Verona
Attendance: 32,790
Referee: Vincent Mauro (United States)

17 June 1990
21:00

Belgium	3–1	Uruguay
Clijsters 16'; Scifo 22'; Ceulemans 48'	Report	Bengoechea 74'

Stadio Marc'Antonio Bentegodi, Verona
Attendance: 33,759
Referee: Siegfried Kirschen (East Germany)

21 June 1990
17:00

Belgium	1–2	Spain
Vervoort 28'	Report	Míchel 20' (pen.); Górriz 38'

Stadio Marc'Antonio Bentegodi, Verona
Attendance: 35,950
Referee: Juan Carlos Loustau (Argentina)

26 June 1990 (second round)
21:00

England	1–0 (a.e.t.)	Belgium
Platt 119'	Report

Stadio Renato Dall'Ara, Bologna
Attendance: 34,520
Referee: Peter Mikkelsen (Denmark)

=== 1994 FIFA World Cup ===
In the 1994 FIFA World Cup two 1–0 wins in round 1 against Morocco and the Netherlands were remarkably not enough to finish second, but Belgium advanced as they were among the best four third-placed teams. In the second round they lost to title defenders Germany (3–2). During this last game, the Belgians were frustrated that Swiss referee Kurt Röthlisberger had not awarded them a penalty kick when German defender Thomas Helmer brought down their striker Josip Weber in the penalty area with a bump from behind. After the match, Röthlisberger was sent home. Michel Preud'homme was elected as best goalkeeper of the tournament.

Pos	Team	Pld	W	D	L	GF	GA	GD	Pts	Qualification
1	Netherlands	3	2	0	1	4	3	+1	6 (Note: Head-to-head result: Netherlands 2–1 Saudi Arabia.)	Advance to knockout stage
2	Saudi Arabia	3	2	0	1	4	3	+1	6	Advance to knockout stage
3	Belgium	3	2	0	1	2	1	+1	6	Advance to knockout stage
4	Morocco	3	0	0	3	2	5	−3	0	

Source: FIFA
Notes:
19 June 1994
12:30 EDT

Belgium	1–0	Morocco
Degryse 11'	Report

Citrus Bowl, Orlando
Attendance: 61,219
Referee: José Torres Cadena (Colombia)

25 June 1994
12:30 EDT

Belgium	1–0	Netherlands
Albert 65'	Report

Citrus Bowl, Orlando
Attendance: 62,387
Referee: Renato Marsiglia (Brazil)

29 June 1994
12:30 EDT

Belgium	0–1	Saudi Arabia
	Report	Al-Owairan 5'

RFK Stadium, Washington
Attendance: 52,959
Referee: Hellmut Krug (Germany)

2 July 1994 (second round)
12:00

Germany	3 – 2	Belgium
Völler 6', 40'; Klinsmann 11'	Report	Grün 8'; Albert 90'

Soldier Field, Chicago
Attendance: 60,246
Referee: Kurt Röthlisberger (Switzerland)

=== 1998 FIFA World Cup ===
In 1998 Belgium was one of only three teams, along with hosts and eventual world champions France and Italy, not to lose a single game. Three draws in the first round – against Netherlands, Mexico and South Korea – proved not enough to reach the knockout stage. In 1998 Enzo Scifo and Franky Van der Elst appeared in their fourth World Cups, setting a Belgian record.

Pos	Team	Pld	W	D	L	GF	GA	GD	Pts	Qualification
1	Netherlands	3	1	2	0	7	2	+5	5	Advance to knockout stage
2	Mexico	3	1	2	0	7	5	+2	5	Advance to knockout stage
3	Belgium	3	0	3	0	3	3	0	3	
4	South Korea	3	0	1	2	2	9	−7	1	

Source: FIFA
13 June 1998 (first round)
21:00

Netherlands	0–0	Belgium
	Report

Stade de France, Saint-Denis
Attendance: 75,000
Referee: Pierluigi Collina (Italy)

20 June 1998 (first round)
17:30

Belgium	2–2	Mexico
Wilmots 43', 47'	Report	García Aspe 55' (pen.); Blanco 62'

Parc Lescure, Bordeaux
Attendance: 31,800
Referee: Hugh Dallas (Scotland)

25 June 1998 (first round)
16:00

Belgium	1–1	South Korea
Nilis 7'	Report	Yoo Sang-Chul 71'

Parc des Princes, Paris
Attendance: 45,500
Referee: Márcio Rezende de Freitas (Brazil)

=== 2002 FIFA World Cup ===
With two ties, the 2002 FIFA World Cup did not start well for Belgium, but the team improved during the tournament. Captain Marc Wilmots was notable for scoring in every match of the first round. Belgium won the decisive group match against Russia with 3–2 and in the second round they had to play against eventual champions Brazil. In this 1/8th final, referee Peter Prendergast disallowed a headed goal by Wilmots that would have given Belgium a 0–1 lead, after a "phantom foul" on Roque Júnior. Eventually Brazil won 2–0, but Brazilian coach Luiz Felipe Scolari admitted after this match that Belgium was a tough edge and after the tournament he declared that the match against the Red Devils had been the hardest for Brazil to win. With the World Cup final still to go, the team did win the tournament's fair-play award. Marc Wilmots equalled the record of Enzo Scifo and Franky Van der Elst by appearing in 4 World Cup squads, although he did not play in his first World Cup in 1990. Wilmots also scored his 5th World Cup goal against Russia, which made him Belgium's top scorer in World Cup Finals matches until the 2018 world cup when Romelu Lukaku also scored his 5th World Cup goal.

Pos	Team	Pld	W	D	L	GF	GA	GD	Pts	Qualification
1	Japan (H)	3	2	1	0	5	2	+3	7	Advance to knockout stage
2	Belgium	3	1	2	0	6	5	+1	5	Advance to knockout stage
3	Russia	3	1	0	2	4	4	0	3	
4	Tunisia	3	0	1	2	1	5	−4	1	

Source: FIFA
Rules for classification: Tie-breaking criteria
(H) Hosts
4 June 2002
18:00

Japan	2–2	Belgium
Suzuki 59'; Inamoto 67'	Report	Wilmots 57'; Van Der Heyden 75'

Saitama Stadium, Saitama
Attendance: 55,256
Referee: William Mattus (Costa Rica)

10 June 2002
18:00

Tunisia	1–1	Belgium
Bouzaiene 17'	Report	Wilmots 13'

Ōita Big Eye Stadium, Ōita
Attendance: 52,000
Referee: Mark Shield (Australia)

14 June 2002
15:30

Belgium	3–2	Russia
Walem 7'; Sonck 78'; Wilmots 82'	Report	Beschastnykh 52'; Sychev 88'

Shizuoka Ecopa Stadium, Fukuroi, Shizuoka
Attendance: 46,640
Referee: Kim Milton Nielsen (Denmark)

17 June 2002 (second round)
20:30

Brazil	2–0	Belgium
Rivaldo 67'; Ronaldo 87'	Report

Kobe Wing Stadium, Kobe
Attendance: 40,440
Referee: Peter Prendergast (Jamaica)

=== 2014 FIFA World Cup ===
In 2014, Belgium started as group favourites and beat all group opponents with the smallest margin. Thereafter, they advanced to the round of 16 and played the United States. The Red Devils needed extra time to proceed to the next stage (2–1), where they faced Argentina. In a balanced quarter-final against the Albiceleste, the World Cup ended for Belgium as they failed to equalize after Gonzalo Higuaín's early goal.

Pos	Team	Pld	W	D	L	GF	GA	GD	Pts	Qualification
1	Belgium	3	3	0	0	4	1	+3	9	Advance to knockout stage
2	Algeria	3	1	1	1	6	5	+1	4	Advance to knockout stage
3	Russia	3	0	2	1	2	3	−1	2	
4	South Korea	3	0	1	2	3	6	−3	1	

Source: FIFA
Rules for classification: Tie-breaking criteria
17 June 2014
13:00

Belgium	2–1	Algeria
Fellaini 70'; Mertens 80'	Report	Feghouli 25' (pen.)

Estádio Mineirão, Belo Horizonte
Attendance: 56,800
Referee: Marco Rodríguez (Mexico)

22 June 2014
13:00

Belgium	1–0	Russia
Origi 88'	Report

Estádio do Maracanã, Rio de Janeiro
Attendance: 73,819
Referee: Felix Brych (Germany)

26 June 2014
17:00

South Korea	0–1	Belgium
	Report	Vertonghen 78'

Arena de São Paulo, São Paulo
Attendance: 61,397
Referee: Benjamin Williams (Australia)

1 July 2014 (round of 16)
17:00

Belgium	2–1 (a.e.t.)	United States
De Bruyne 93'; Lukaku 105'	Report	Green 107'

Arena Fonte Nova, Salvador
Attendance: 51,227
Referee: Djamel Haimoudi (Algeria)

5 July 2014 (quarter-finals)
13:00

Argentina	1–0	Belgium
Higuaín 8'	Report

Estádio Nacional Mané Garrincha, Brasília
Attendance: 68,551
Referee: Nicola Rizzoli (Italy)

=== 2018 FIFA World Cup ===
Pos	Team	Pld	W	D	L	GF	GA	GD	Pts	Qualification
1	Belgium	3	3	0	0	9	2	+7	9	Advance to knockout stage
2	England	3	2	0	1	8	3	+5	6	Advance to knockout stage
3	Tunisia	3	1	0	2	5	8	−3	3	
4	Panama	3	0	0	3	2	11	−9	0	

Source: FIFA
Rules for classification: Group stage tiebreakers
18 June 2018
18:00 MSK (UTC+3)

Belgium	3–0	Panama
Mertens 47'; Lukaku 69', 75'	Report

Fisht Olympic Stadium, Sochi
Attendance: 43,257
Referee: Janny Sikazwe (Zambia)

23 June 2018
15:00 MSK (UTC+3)

Belgium	5–2	Tunisia
E. Hazard 6' (pen.), 51'; Lukaku 16', 45+3'; Batshuayi 90'	Report	Bronn 18'; Khazri 90+3'

Spartak Stadium, Moscow
Attendance: 44,190
Referee: Jair Marrufo (United States)

28 June 2018
20:00 KALT (UTC+2)

England	0–1	Belgium
	Report	Januzaj 51'

Kaliningrad Stadium, Kaliningrad
Attendance: 33,973
Referee: Damir Skomina (Slovenia)

2 July 2018
21:00 MSK (UTC+3)
Round of 16

Belgium	3–2	Japan
Vertonghen 69'; Fellaini 74'; Chadli 90+4'	Report	Haraguchi 48'; Inui 52'

Rostov Arena, Rostov-on-Don
Attendance: 41,466
Referee: Malang Diedhiou (Senegal)

6 July 2018
21:00 MSK (UTC+3)
Quarter-final

Brazil	1–2	Belgium
Renato Augusto 76'	Report	Fernandinho 13' (o.g.); De Bruyne 31'

Kazan Arena, Kazan
Attendance: 42,873
Referee: Milorad Mažić (Serbia)

10 July 2018
21:00 MSK (UTC+3)
Semi-final

France	1–0	Belgium
Umtiti 51'	Report

Krestovsky Stadium, Saint Petersburg
Attendance: 64,286
Referee: Andrés Cunha (Uruguay)

14 July 2018
17:00 MSK (UTC+3)
Match for third place

Belgium	2–0	England
Meunier 4'; E. Hazard 82'	Report

Krestovsky Stadium, Saint Petersburg
Attendance: 64,406
Referee: Alireza Faghani (Iran)

=== 2022 FIFA World Cup ===
Pos	Team	Pld	W	D	L	GF	GA	GD	Pts	Qualification
1	Morocco	3	2	1	0	4	1	+3	7	Advance to knockout stage
2	Croatia	3	1	2	0	4	1	+3	5	Advance to knockout stage
3	Belgium	3	1	1	1	1	2	−1	4	
4	Canada	3	0	0	3	2	7	−5	0	

Source: FIFA
Rules for classification: Group stage tiebreakers
23 November 2022
22:00

Belgium	1–0	Canada
Batshuayi 44'

Ahmad bin Ali Stadium, Al Rayyan
Attendance: 40,432
Referee: Janny Sikazwe (Zambia)

27 November 2022
16:00

Belgium	0–2	Morocco
		Saïss 73'; Aboukhlal 90+2'

Al Thumama Stadium, Doha
Attendance: 43,738
Referee: César Arturo Ramos (Mexico)

1 December 2022
18:00

Croatia	0–0	Belgium

Ahmad bin Ali Stadium, Al Rayyan
Attendance: 43,984
Referee: Anthony Taylor (England)

=== 2026 FIFA World Cup ===
==== Group stage ====
Pos	Team	Pld	W	D	L	GF	GA	GD	Pts	Qualification
1	Belgium	3	1	2	0	6	2	+4	5 (Note: Tied on head-to-head result (Belgium 1–1 Egypt). Overall goal difference was used as the tiebreaker.)	Advance to knockout stage
2	Egypt	3	1	2	0	5	3	+2	5	Advance to knockout stage
3	Iran	3	0	3	0	3	3	0	3	
4	New Zealand	3	0	1	2	4	10	−6	1	

Source: FIFA
Notes:
June 15, 2026
12:00 p.m. UTC−7

Belgium	1–1	Egypt
Hany 66' (o.g.)	(Note: "Belgium vs Egypt | First Stage | FIFA World Cup 2026". FIFA. Retrieved June 15, 2026.; "Match Report – Group G – Belgium v. Egypt". FIFA. Retrieved June 15, 2026.; "Post match summary report – Group G – Belgium v. Egypt". FIFA. June 15, 2026. Retrieved June 17, 2026.)	Ashour 19'

Lumen Field, Seattle
Attendance: 66,775
Referee: Ramon Abatti (Brazil)

June 21, 2026
12:00 p.m. UTC−7

Belgium	0–0	Iran
	(Note: "Belgium vs IR Iran | First Stage | FIFA World Cup 2026". FIFA. Retrieved June 21, 2026.; "Match Report – Group G – Belgium v. IR Iran". FIFA. June 21, 2026. Retrieved June 21, 2026.; "Post match summary report – Group G – Belgium v. IR Iran". FIFA. June 22, 2026. Retrieved June 22, 2026.)

SoFi Stadium, Inglewood
Attendance: 70,317
Referee: Darío Herrera (Argentina)

June 26, 2026
8:00 p.m. UTC−7

New Zealand	1–5	Belgium
Just 84'	(Note: "New Zealand vs Belgium | First Stage | FIFA World Cup 2026". FIFA. Retrieved June 27, 2026.; "Match Report – Group G – New Zealand v. Belgium". FIFA. June 27, 2026. Retrieved June 27, 2026.; "Post match summary report – Group G – New Zealand v. Belgium". FIFA. June 27, 2026. Retrieved June 27, 2026.)	Trossard 28', 50'; De Bruyne 66'; Lukaku 86'; Saelemaekers 90+4'

BC Place, Vancouver
Attendance: 52,497
Referee: Adham Makhadmeh (Jordan)

==== Knockout stage ====
Round of 32

July 1, 2026
1:00 p.m. UTC−7

Belgium	3–2 (a.e.t.)	Senegal
Lukaku 86'; Tielemans 89', 120+5' (pen.)	(Note: "Belgium vs Senegal | Round of 32 | FIFA World Cup 2026". FIFA. Retrieved June 28, 2026.; "Match Report – Round of 32 – Belgium v. Senegal". FIFA. July 1, 2026. Retrieved July 1, 2026.; "Post match summary report – Round of 32 – Belgium v. Senegal". FIFA. July 1, 2026. Retrieved July 3, 2026.)	Diarra 25'; I. Sarr 51'

Lumen Field, Seattle
Attendance: 66,925
Referee: Saíd Martínez (Honduras)

Round of 16

July 6, 2026
5:00 p.m. UTC−7

United States	1–4	Belgium
Tillman 31'	(Note: "USA vs Belgium | Round of 16 | FIFA World Cup 2026". FIFA. Retrieved July 7, 2026.; "Match Report – Round of 16 – USA v. Belgium". FIFA. July 7, 2026. Retrieved July 7, 2026.; "Post match summary report – Round of 16 – USA v. Belgium". FIFA. July 7, 2026. Retrieved July 7, 2026.)	De Ketelaere 9', 33'; Vanaken 57'; Lukaku 90+3'

Lumen Field, Seattle
Attendance: 66,925
Referee: Adham Makhadmeh (Jordan)

Quarter-finals

July 10, 2026
12:00 p.m. UTC−7

Spain	2–1	Belgium
Fabián 30'; Merino 88'	(Note: "Spain vs Belgium | Quarter-final | FIFA World Cup 2026". FIFA. Retrieved July 10, 2026.; "Match Report – Quarter-final – Spain v. Belgium". FIFA. July 10, 2026. Retrieved July 10, 2026.; "Post match summary report – Quarter-final – Spain v. Belgium". FIFA. July 11, 2026. Retrieved July 11, 2026.)	De Ketelaere 41'

SoFi Stadium, Inglewood
Attendance: 70,492
Referee: Michael Oliver (England)

== Overview ==
=== Tournaments ===
Champions Runners-up Third place

FIFA World Cup record											Qualification record						
Year	Host(s)	Round	Position	Pld	W	D	L	GF	GA	Squad	Pos.	Pld	W	D	L	GF	GA
1930	Uruguay	Group stage	11th	2	0	0	2	0	4	Squad	Qualified as invitees						
1934	Italy	Round of 16	15th	1	0	0	1	2	5	Squad	2nd	2	0	1	1	6	8
1938	France	Round of 16	13th	1	0	0	1	1	3	Squad	2nd	2	1	1	0	4	3
1950	Brazil	Did not enter									Did not enter						
1954	Switzerland	Group stage	12th	2	0	1	1	5	8	Squad	1st	4	3	1	0	11	6
1958	Sweden	Did not qualify									2nd	4	2	1	1	16	11
1962	Chile	Did not qualify									3rd	4	0	0	4	3	10
1966	England	Did not qualify									Play-off	5	3	0	2	12	5
1970	Mexico	Group stage	10th	3	1	0	2	4	5	Squad	1st	6	4	1	1	14	8
1974	West Germany	Did not qualify									2nd	6	4	2	0	12	0
1978	Argentina	Did not qualify									2nd	6	3	0	3	7	6
1982	Spain	Second group stage	10th	5	2	1	2	3	5	Squad	1st	8	5	1	2	12	9
1986	Mexico	Fourth place	4th	7	2	2	3	12	15	Squad	Play-off	8	4	2	2	9	5
1990	Italy	Round of 16	11th	4	2	0	2	6	4	Squad	1st	8	4	4	0	15	5
1994	United States	Round of 16	11th	4	2	0	2	4	4	Squad	2nd	10	7	1	2	16	5
1998	France	Group stage	19th	3	0	3	0	3	3	Squad	Play-off	10	7	1	2	23	13
2002	South Korea; Japan	Round of 16	14th	4	1	2	1	6	7	Squad	Play-off	10	7	2	1	27	6
2006	Germany	Did not qualify									4th	10	3	3	4	16	11
2010	South Africa	Did not qualify									4th	10	3	1	6	13	20
2014	Brazil	Quarter-finals	6th	5	4	0	1	6	3	Squad	1st	10	8	2	0	18	4
2018	Russia	Third place	3rd	7	6	0	1	16	6	Squad	1st	10	9	1	0	43	6
2022	Qatar	Group stage	23rd	3	1	1	1	1	2	Squad	1st	8	6	2	0	25	6
2026	Canada; Mexico; United States	Quarter-finals	6th	6	3	2	1	14	7	Squad	1st	8	5	3	0	29	7
2030 (Note: Additional matches are scheduled to be played in Argentina, Paraguay, and Uruguay in commemoration of the 100th anniversary of the first World Cup, however they are not considered to be official hosts of the tournament.)	Spain; Portugal; Morocco	To be determined									To be determined						
2034	Saudi Arabia	To be determined									To be determined						
Total		Third place	15/23	57	24	12	21	83	81	—	15/23	149	88	30	31	331	154
Champions Runners-up Third place

Belgium's World Cup record
First Match	United States 3–0 Belgium (13 July 1930; Montevideo, Uruguay)
Biggest Win	Belgium 5–1 New Zealand (26 June 2026; Vancouver, Canada)
Biggest Defeat	United States 3–0 Belgium (13 July 1930; Montevideo, Uruguay); Germany 5–2 Belgium (27 May 1934; Florence, Italy); Italy 4–1 Belgium (20 June 1954; Lugano, Switzerland); Soviet Union 4–1 Belgium (6 June 1970; Mexico City, Mexico); Poland 3–0 Belgium (28 June 1982; Barcelona, Spain)
Best Result	Third place in 2018
Worst Result	Group stage in 1930, 1934, 1938, 1954, 1970, 1998 and 2022

=== Matches ===
List of FIFA World Cup matches
Year	Round	Opponent	Score	Result	Record
1930	Round 1	United States	0–3	Loss	0–0–1
1930	Round 1	Paraguay	0–1	Loss	0–0–2
1934	Round 1	Germany	2–5	Loss	0–0–3
1938	Round 1	France	1–3	Loss	0–0–4
1954	Group stage	England	4–4 (a.e.t.)	Draw	0–1–4
1954	Group stage	Italy	1–4	Loss	0–1–5
1970	Group stage	El Salvador	3–0	Win	1–1–5
1970	Group stage	Soviet Union	1–4	Loss	1–1–6
1970	Group stage	Mexico	0–1	Loss	1–1–7
1982	Group stage 1	Argentina	1–0	Win	2–1–7
1982	Group stage 1	El Salvador	1–0	Win	3–1–7
1982	Group stage 1	Hungary	1–1	Draw	3–2–7
1982	Group stage 2	Poland	0–3	Loss	3–2–8
1982	Group stage 2	Soviet Union	0–1	Loss	3–2–9
1986	Group stage	Mexico	1–2	Loss	3–2–10
1986	Group stage	Iraq	2–1	Win	4–2–10
1986	Group stage	Paraguay	2–2	Draw	4–3–10
1986	Round of 16	Soviet Union	4–3 (a.e.t.)	Win	5–3–10
1986	Quarter-final	Spain	1–1 (a.e.t.) (5–4 p)	Draw	5–4–10
1986	Semi-final	Argentina	0–2	Loss	5–4–11
1986	Match for third place	France	2–4 (a.e.t.)	Loss	5–4–12
1990	Group stage	South Korea	2–0	Win	6–4–12
1990	Group stage	Uruguay	3–1	Win	7–4–12
1990	Group stage	Spain	1–2	Loss	7–4–13
1990	Round of 16	England	0–1 (a.e.t.)	Loss	7–4–14
1994	Group stage	Morocco	1–0	Win	8–4–14
1994	Group stage	Netherlands	1–0	Win	9–4–14
1994	Group stage	Saudi Arabia	0–1	Loss	9–4–15
1994	Round of 16	Germany	2–3	Loss	9–4–16
1998	Group stage	Netherlands	0–0	Draw	9–5–16
1998	Group stage	Mexico	2–2	Draw	9–6–16
1998	Group stage	South Korea	1–1	Draw	9–7–16
2002	Group stage	Japan	2–2	Draw	9–8–16
2002	Group stage	Tunisia	1–1	Draw	9–9–16
2002	Group stage	Russia	3–2	Win	10–9–16
2002	Round of 16	Brazil	0–2	Loss	10–9–17
2014	Group stage	Algeria	2–1	Win	11–9–17
2014	Group stage	Russia	1–0	Win	12–9–17
2014	Group stage	South Korea	1–0	Win	13–9–17
2014	Round of 16	United States	2–1 (a.e.t.)	Win	14–9–17
2014	Quarter-final	Argentina	0–1	Loss	14–9–18
2018	Group stage	Panama	3–0	Win	15–9–18
2018	Group stage	Tunisia	5–2	Win	16–9–18
2018	Group stage	England	1–0	Win	17–9–18
2018	Round of 16	Japan	3–2	Win	18–9–18
2018	Quarter-final	Brazil	2–1	Win	19–9–18
2018	Semi-final	France	0–1	Loss	19–9–19
2018	Match for third place	England	2–0	Win	20–9–19
2022	Group stage	Canada	1–0	Win	21–9–19
2022	Group stage	Morocco	0–2	Loss	21–9–20
2022	Group stage	Croatia	0–0	Draw	21–10–20
2026	Group stage	Egypt	1–1	Draw	21–11–20
2026	Group stage	Iran	0–0	Draw	21–12–20
2026	Group stage	New Zealand	5–1	Win	22–12–20
2026	Round of 32	Senegal	3–2 (a.e.t.)	Win	23–12–20
2026	Round of 16	United States	4–1	Win	24–12–20
2026	Quarter-final	Spain	1–2	Loss	24–12–21

== Player records ==
=== Most appearances ===
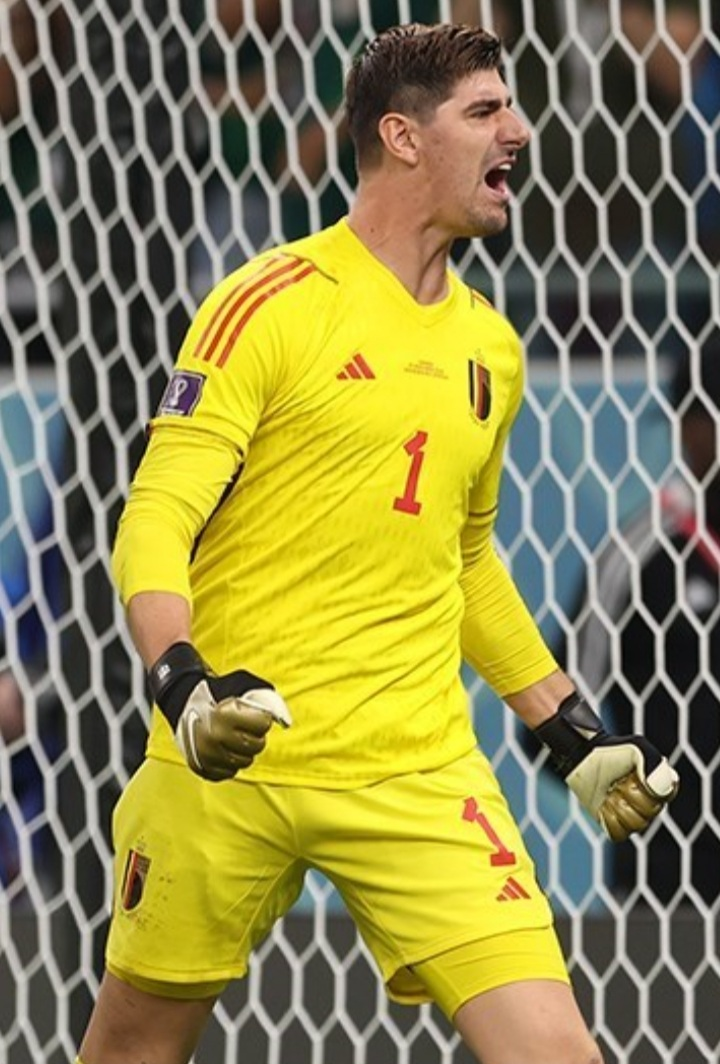
Thibaut Courtois, Belgium's record holder for World Cup appearances.

Rank	Player	Matches	World Cups
1	Thibaut Courtois	21	2014, 2018, 2022 and 2026
2	Kevin De Bruyne	18	2014, 2018, 2022 and 2026
2	Romelu Lukaku	18	2014, 2018, 2022 and 2026
4	Enzo Scifo	17	1986, 1990, 1994 and 1998
5	Jan Ceulemans	16	1982, 1986 and 1990
6	Axel Witsel	15	2014, 2018, 2022 and 2026
7	Franky van der Elst	14	1986, 1990, 1994 and 1998
7	Eden Hazard	14	2014, 2018 and 2022
7	Jan Vertonghen	14	2014, 2018 and 2022
10	Toby Alderweireld	13	2014, 2018 and 2022
10	Dries Mertens	13	2014, 2018 and 2022

=== Goalscorers ===
Romelu Lukaku, Belgium's all-time top scorer at the World Cup.

After Belgium failed to score at the inaugural 1930 FIFA World Cup, Bernard Voorhoof made history on 27 May 1934 when he scored his country's first-ever goal at the tournament, netting a brace in their round of 16 match against Germany in Florence.

Player	Goals	1930	1934	1938	1954	1970	1982	1986	1990	1994	1998	2002	2014	2018	2022	2026
Romelu Lukaku	8												1	4		3
Marc Wilmots	5										2	3				
Jan Ceulemans	4							3	1							
Léopold Anoul	3				3											
Nico Claesen	3							3								
Enzo Scifo	3							2	1							
Eden Hazard	3													3		
Kevin De Bruyne	3												1	1		1
Charles De Ketelaere	3															3
Bernard Voorhoof	2		2													
Raoul Lambert	2					2										
Wilfried Van Moer	2					2										
Erwin Vandenbergh	2						1	1								
Marc Degryse	2								1	1						
Philippe Albert	2									2						
Dries Mertens	2												1	1		
Jan Vertonghen	2												1	1		
Marouane Fellaini	2												1	1		
Michy Batshuayi	2													1	1	
Leandro Trossard	2															2
Youri Tielemans	2															2
Hendrik Isemborghs	1			1												
Henri Coppens	1				1											
Ludo Coeck	1						1									
Alexandre Czerniatynski	1						1									
Franky Vercauteren	1							1								
Daniel Veyt	1							1								
Stéphane Demol	1							1								
Michel De Wolf	1								1							
Lei Clijsters	1								1							
Patrick Vervoort	1								1							
Georges Grün	1									1						
Luc Nilis	1										1					
Peter Van der Heyden	1											1				
Johan Walem	1											1				
Wesley Sonck	1											1				
Divock Origi	1												1			
Adnan Januzaj	1													1		
Nacer Chadli	1													1		
Thomas Meunier	1													1		
Alexis Saelemaekers	1															1
Hans Vanaken	1															1
Own goals	3				1									1		1
Total	83	0	2	1	5	4	3	12	6	4	3	6	6	16	1	14

== Awards ==
=== Team ===
- FIFA Fair Play Trophy 2002

=== Individual ===
- Golden Glove 1986: Jean-Marie Pfaff
- Golden Glove 1994: Michel Preud'homme
- Golden Glove 2018: Thibaut Courtois
- Best Young Player Award 1986: Enzo Scifo
- Silver Ball 2018: Eden Hazard
- FIFA All Star Team 1994: Michel Preud'homme
- FIFA All Star Team 2018: Thibaut Courtois and Eden Hazard
- FIFA.com Dream Team 2018: Thibaut Courtois and Kevin De Bruyne

== See also ==
- Belgium national football team records and statistics
- Belgium at the UEFA European Championship
