= Carree (name) =

Carree is a surname. Notable people with this name include the following:

- Franciscus Carree (ca. 1630 - 1669), Dutch painter
- Isaac Carree (born 1973), American musician
- Michiel Carree (1657 – 1727), Dutch painter

== See also ==
- Carré (surname)
- Carré Otis
- Carrie (name)
- Carrer (disambiguation)
