= 1954 FIFA World Cup qualification Group 2 =

The three teams in this group played against each other on a home-and-away basis. The group winner Belgium qualified for the fifth FIFA World Cup held in Switzerland.

== Table and Matches ==
Final table													Home							Away						
Rank	Team	Pld	W	D	L	GF	GA	GD	Pts	(Belgium)	(Sweden)	(Finland)	Pld	W	D	L	GF	GA	Pts	Pld	W	D	L	GF	GA	Pts
1.	Belgium	4	3	1	0	11	6	+5	7	X	2:0	2:2	2	1	1	0	4	2	3	2	2	0	0	7	4	4
2.	Sweden	4	1	1	2	9	8	+1	3	2:3	X	4:0	2	1	0	1	6	3	2	2	0	1	1	3	5	1
3.	Finland	4	0	2	2	7	13	-6	2	2:4	3:3	X	2	0	1	1	5	7	1	2	0	1	1	2	6	1

25 May 1953	Finland	2 – 4	Belgium	Helsinki, Finland
	Lehtovirta 49', 75'	Report	Coppens 4', 26', 83'; Anoul 9'	Stadium: Olympiastadion; Referee: Helge (Denmark)

28 May 1953	Sweden	2 – 3	Belgium	Stockholm, Sweden
	Bengtsson 20'; Selmosson 26'	Report	Anoul 28'; Straetmans 37'; Lemberechts 40'	Stadium: Råsunda Stadion; Referee: Mowat (Scotland)

5 August 1953	Finland	3 – 3	Sweden	Helsinki, Finland
	Lehtovirta 63'; Lahtinen 67'; Rikberg 70'	Report	Sandell 9', 71'; Persson 23'	Stadium: Olympiastadion; Referee: Baalstad (Norway)

16 August 1953	Sweden	4 – 0	Finland	Stockholm, Sweden
	Sandberg 22'; Sandell 24', 61'; Sandin 56'	Report		Stadium: Råsunda Stadion; Referee: Asmussen (Denmark)

23 September 1953	Belgium	2 – 2	Finland	Brussels, Belgium
	Bollen 25' 75'	Report	Lahtinen 83'; Vaihela 90'	Stadium: Heysel Stadion; Referee: Baumberger (Switzerland)

8 October 1953	Belgium	2 – 0	Sweden	Brussels, Belgium
	Coppens 23'; Mees 49'	Report		Stadium: Heysel Stadion; Referee: Schipper (Netherlands)

Belgium qualified.

== Team stats ==
=== Belgium ===
Head coach: (England) Bill Gormlie (first and second match); (Scotland) Doug Livingstone (third and fourth match)

Pos.	Player	DoB	Games played	Goals	Minutes played	Sub off	Sub on	(Finland)	(Sweden)	(Finland)	(Sweden)	Club
FW	Léopold Anoul	August 19, 1922	4	2	360	0	0	90	90	90	90	(Belgium) FC Liégeois
MF	Fernand Blaise	February 7, 1925	1	0	90	0	0	90	B	-	-	(Belgium) Standard Liège
FW	Mathieu Bollen	December 31, 1928	2	2	180	0	0	-	-	90	90	(Belgium) Waterschei Thor
MF	Louis Carré	January 7, 1925	4	0	360	0	0	90	90	90	90	(Belgium) FC Liégeois
FW	Henri Coppens	April 29, 1930	4	4	360	0	0	90	90	90	90	(Belgium) Beerschot VAV
GK	François Daenen	August 18, 1919	2	0	180	0	0	B	90	90	B	(Belgium) FC Tilleur
DF	Henri Dirickx	July 7, 1927	2	0	180	0	0	90	B	B	90	(Belgium) Union Saint-Gilloise
DF	Marcel Dries	September 19, 1929	2	0	180	0	0	B	90	90	B	(Belgium) Berchem Sport
GK	Léopold Gernaey	February 25, 1927	1	0	90	0	0	-	-	B	90	(Belgium) AS Oostende
MF	Joseph Givard	May 7, 1923	1	0	90	0	0	-	-	-	90	(Belgium) Standard Liège
FW	Augustin Janssens	September 24, 1930	3	0	270	0	0	90	90	90	-	(Belgium) Union Saint-Gilloise
FW	Victor Lemberechts	May 18, 1924	2	1	180	0	0	90	90	-	-	(Belgium) KV Mechelen
MF	Robert Maertens	January 24, 1930	4	0	360	0	0	90	90	90	90	(Belgium) FC Antwerp
MF	Victor Mees	January 27, 1927	3	1	270	0	0	B	90	90	90	(Belgium) FC Antwerp
FW	Joseph Mermans	February 16, 1922	1	0	90	0	0	90	B	B	B	(Belgium) RSC Anderlecht
GK	Armand Seghers	June 21, 1926	1	0	90	0	0	90	B	-	-	(Belgium) AA Gent
FW	Jean Straetmans	June 13, 1930	1	1	90	0	0	B	90	-	-	(Belgium) White Star AC
DF	Alfons Van Brandt	June 24, 1927	4	0	360	0	0	90	90	90	90	(Belgium) Lierse SK
FW	Fernand Van Gestel	January 20, 1930	2	0	180	0	0	-	-	90	90	(Belgium) Lyra TSV
MF	Robert Van Kerkhoven	October 1, 1924	0	0	0	0	0	B	B	B	B	(Belgium) Daring Bruxelles

=== Sweden ===
Head coach: (Sweden) Putte Kock

Pos.	Player	DoB	Games played	Goals	Minutes played	Sub off	Sub on	(Belgium)	(Finland)	(Finland)	(Belgium)	Club
FW	Hans Andersson		2	0	180	0	0	90	-	-	90	(Sweden) Djurgårdens IF
FW	Jan Aronsson		1	0	90	0	0	-	-	-	90	(Sweden) Degerfors IF
FW	Sylve Bengtsson	July 2, 1930	1	1	90	0	0	90	-	-	-	(Sweden) Halmstads BK
DF	Orvar Bergmark	November 16, 1930	4	0	360	0	0	90	90	90	90	(Sweden) Örebro SK
FW	Lars Eriksson		2	0	180	0	0	90	90	-	-	(Sweden) Degerfors IF
MF	Bengt Gustavsson	January 13, 1928	4	0	360	0	0	90	90	90	90	(Sweden) IFK Norrköping
FW	Kurt Hamrin	November 19, 1934	1	0	90	0	0	-	-	-	90	(Sweden) AIK
FW	Lennart Holmqvist		1	0	90	0	0	-	90	-	-	(Sweden) IFK Norrköping
DF	Gösta Lindh	August 8, 1924	4	0	360	0	0	90	90	90	90	(Sweden) Örebro SK
FW	Gösta Löfgren	August 29, 1923	2	0	180	0	0	-	-	90	90	(Sweden) Motala AIF
FW	Hans Persson	1929	1	1	90	0	0	-	90	-	-	(Sweden) Helsingborgs IF
DF	Lennart Samuelsson	July 7, 1924	3	0	270	0	0	90	-	90	90	(Sweden) IF Elfsborg
FW	Gösta Sandberg	August 6, 1932	3	1	270	0	0	90	-	90	90	(Sweden) Djurgårdens IF
DF	Sune Sandbring	April 10, 1928	1	0	90	0	0	-	90	-	-	(Sweden) Malmö FF
FW	Nils-Åke Sandell	February 5, 1927	2	4	180	0	0	-	90	90	-	(Sweden) Malmö FF
FW	Herbert Sandin		1	0	90	0	0	-	-	90	-	(Sweden) IFK Norrköping
FW	Arne Selmosson	March 29, 1931	1	1	90	0	0	90	-	-	-	(Sweden) Jönköpings Södra IF
GK	Kalle Svensson	November 11, 1925	4	0	360	0	0	90	90	90	90	(Sweden) Hälsingborgs IF
MF	Sven-Ove Svensson	1922	4	0	360	0	0	90	90	90	90	(Sweden) Hälsingborgs IF
MF	Henry Tillberg		2	0	180	0	0	-	90	90	-	(Sweden) Malmö FF

=== Finland ===
Head coach: (Finland) Aatos Lehtonen

Pos.	Player	DoB	Games played	Goals	Minutes played	Sub off	Sub on	(Belgium)	(Sweden)	(Sweden)	(Belgium)	Club
FW	Rainer Forss	October 20, 1930	3	0	270	0	0	90	90	90	-	(Finland) Pyrkivä Turku
FW	Matti Hiltunen	January 26, 1933	1	0	90	0	0	90	-	-	-	(Finland) Koparit
GK	Matti Jokinen	November 8, 1928	1	0	90	0	0	90	-	-	-	(Finland) Vasa IFK
GK	Aarre Klinga	March 20, 1930	2	0	180	0	0	-	90	90	-	(Finland) KIF Helsinki
DF	Pekka Kupiainen	November 25, 1929	1	0	90	0	0	-	-	-	90	(Finland) KTP Kotka
FW	Olavi Lahtinen	January 5, 1929	4	1	360	0	0	90	90	90	90	(Finland) HJK Helsinki
MF	Martti Laitinen	August 2, 1925	1	0	90	0	0	90	-	-	-	(Finland) Helsingin Ponnistus
MF	Lauri Lehtinen	August 19, 1927	3	0	270	0	0	90	90	90	-	(Finland) HJK Helsinki
FW	Kalevi Lehtovirta	February 20, 1928	4	3	360	0	0	90	90	90	90	(Finland) /2 TPS Turku
DF	Åke Lindman	January 11, 1928	3	0	270	0	0	-	90	90	90	(Finland) /2 HIFK
DF	Kurt Martin	March 13, 1923	4	0	360	0	0	90	90	90	90	(Finland) Vasa IFK
FW	Stig-Göran Myntti	August 6, 1925	3	0	270	0	0	90	90	90	-	(Finland) Vasa IFK
DF	Sulo Parkkinen	April 24, 1930	1	0	90	0	0	90	-	-	-	(Finland) KTP Kotka
MF	Seppo Pelkonen	March 13, 1930	3	0	270	0	0	-	90	90	90	(Finland) KuPS
DF	Aimo Pulkkinen	June 14, 1928	2	0	180	0	0	-	90	90	-	(Finland) FC Haka
FW	Nils Rikberg	March 29, 1928	3	1	270	0	0	-	90	90	90	(Finland) /2 ÅIFK Turku
GK	Mauno Rintanen	November 28, 1925	1	0	90	0	0	-	-	-	90	(Finland) HJK Helsinki
FW	Aulis Rytkönen	January 5, 1929	1	1	90	0	0	-	-	-	90	(France) Toulouse FC
DF	Reino Suojanen	September 3, 1925	1	0	90	0	0	-	-	-	90	(Finland) Pyrkivä Turku
FW	Jorma Vaihela	September 30, 1925	2	1	180	0	0	90	-	-	90	(Finland) RU-38 Pori
