= Carrer =

Carrer is a surname. Notable people with the name include:

- Gabriel Carrer (born 1981), Canadian director and screenwriter
- Gustavo Carrer (1885–1968), Italian footballer
- Pavlos Carrer (1829–1896) Greek composer

== See also ==
- Career (disambiguation)
- Carré (disambiguation)
- Carree (name)
