= Antoine Carré =

Antoine Carré may refer to:

- Antoine Carré (politician), member of the National Assembly of France
- Antoine Carré (guitarist), baroque guitarist and composer
- Antoine Carre (explorer), French explorer and fur trader
