= Hendrik Carré =

Dutch painter

Hendrik Carré (October 2, 1656, Amsterdam – July 7, 1721, The Hague), was a Dutch Golden Age painter.

== Biography ==
According to Houbraken he was a pupil first of Jacob Jordaens in Antwerp, and then Juriaen Jacobsze in Leeuwarden, where he painted for Henry Casimir II, Prince of Nassau-Dietz.

According to the RKD he was the son of Franciscus Carree and became Jacobsze's pupil in Leeuwarden in 1669. He married in The Hague in 1683, where he stayed. His pupils were his sons Hendrik and Franciscus Abraham, his younger brothers Abraham and Michiel, Carel Galois, Emilie Raes, and Pieter de Raep. He painted Italianate landscapes and genre pieces.
