= Sulo Parkkinen =

Finnish footballer (1930-2013)

Personal information
- Date of birth: 21 April 1930
- Date of death: 10 June 2013 (aged 83)

International career
Years	Team	Apps	(Gls)
1953–1955	Finland	2	(0)

Sulo Parkkinen (21 April 1930 – 10 June 2013) was a Finnish footballer. He played in two matches for the Finland national football team from 1953 to 1955. He was also part of Finland's team at the 1952 Summer Olympics, and for their qualification matches for the 1954 FIFA World Cup.
