= Michiel Carree =

Dutch Golden Age painter

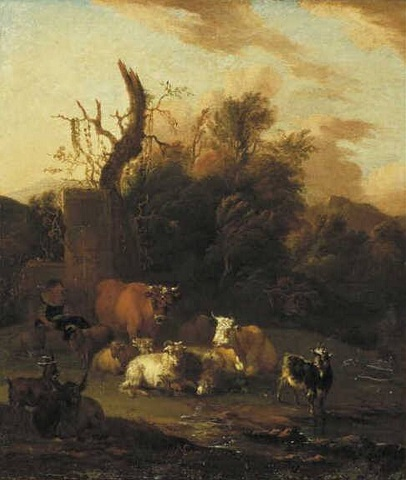
Michiel Carree. Wooded Landscape with Cattle. 1685. Rotterdam, Museum Boijmans Van Beuningen.

Michiel Carree or Carré (1657 – October 1727) was a Dutch Golden Age painter.

Carree was born in The Hague. He received his first instructions from his elder brother Hendrik Carré, and afterwards became the scholar of Nicolaas Berchem, but unfortunately did not profit by the example and practice of so excellent a master, but preferred to follow the style of a much inferior artist named Gabriel van der Leeuw. According to Houbraken he was in England and knew Pieter Gerritsz van Roestraten. Houbraken also stated Carree was the teacher of the painter Jan de Visscher, and mentioned him again as his informant about a portrait by Katharina Rozee. Houbraken also stated that Michiel Carré resided some time in England, and that his works were not popular here, but Horace Walpole makes no mention of him in his 'Anecdotes.' He was a landscape painter of some celebrity, since at the death of Abraham Begeyn he was invited to Berlin by the King of Prussia, who appointed him one of his painters. On the death of Frederick he returned to Holland, and resided chiefly at Alkmaar, where he died in 1728. His greatest merit was the uncommon facility and baldness of his pencil, which was well suited to the works upon which he was principally engaged, the decoration of halls and large apartments. One of his best productions is to be seen in a saloon at the Hague, where he has represented in a large landscape, the History of Jacob and Esau. Some of his easel paintings, landscapes with cattle, are very good. Examples of these can be found in the Brunswick Gallery, and the Rotterdam Museum. He died in Alkmaar.

Jacob Campo Weyerman mentioned his daughter Alida Carree, who was a good watercolor painter and ivory fan painter. He also mentioned a son Hendrik Carré the Younger who died in the Hague in 1726.

According to the RKD he was the son of Franciscus Carré and he worked in Amsterdam 1686-1692, England 1692-1695, and Berlin 1697-1713. He is known for Italianate landscapes and was court painter in Berlin to Frederick III of Brandenburg.
