= Hendrik Carré II =

Dutch painter

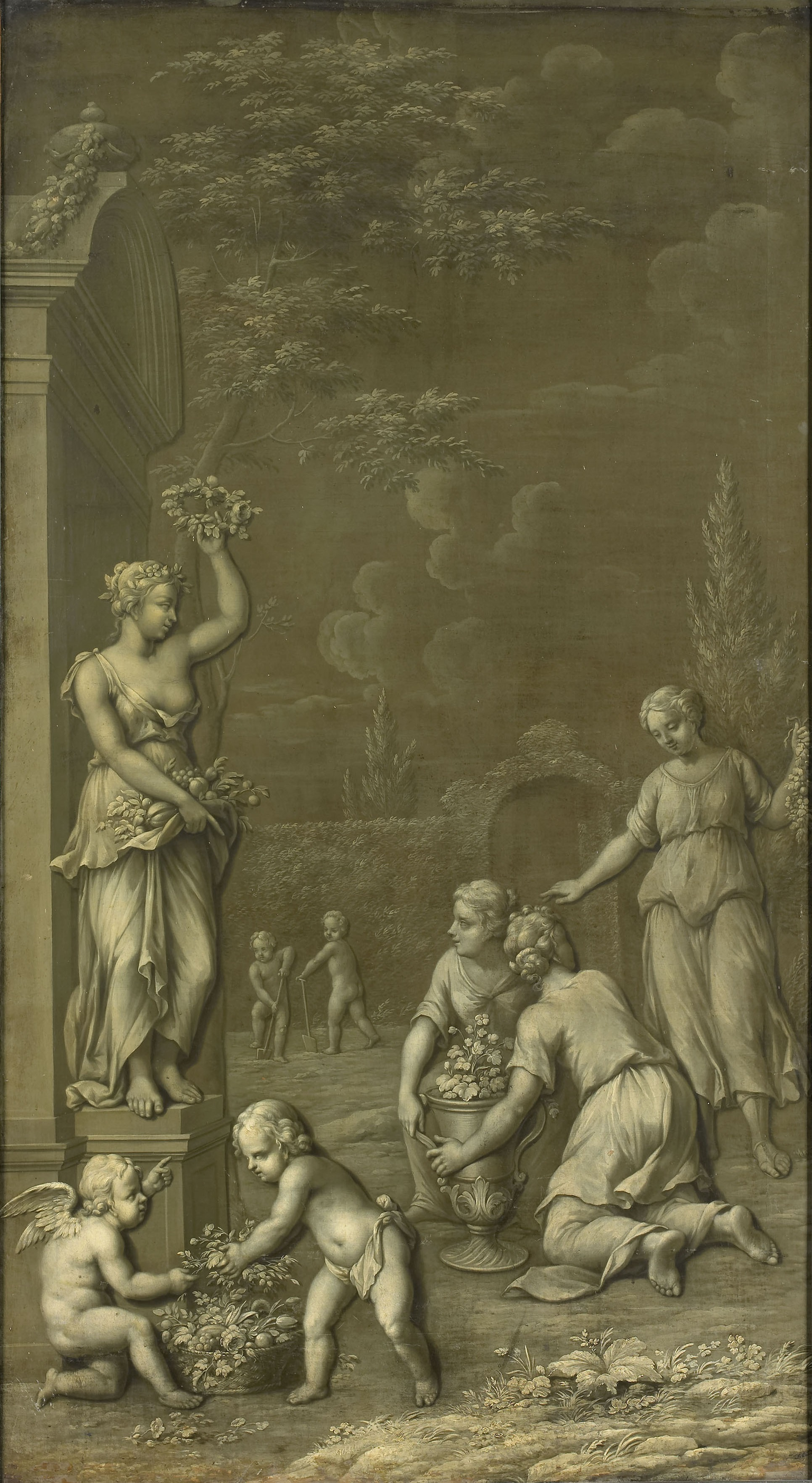
Grisaille

Hendrik Carré the Younger (1696–1775), was an 18th-century painter from the Dutch Republic.

== Biography ==
He was born in The Hague as the son of Hendrik Carré. He became a member of the Confrerie Pictura in 1719. He was the younger brother of Abraham and the older brother of Johannes, and is known for miniatures, wall decorations, grisailles, and stage decorations for the French theatre of the Hague. He died in The Hague.

== Works ==
His grisaille oil painting Hulde aan Pomona (Homage to Pomona) is in the collection of the Rijksmuseum, Netherlands.
