= Aimo Pulkkinen =

Finnish footballer (1928–2018)

Personal information
- Date of birth: 14 June 1928
- Date of death: 5 May 2018 (aged 89)

International career
Years	Team	Apps	(Gls)
1953–1958	Finland	8	(0)

Aimo Pulkkinen (14 June 1928 – 5 May 2018) was a Finnish footballer. He played in eight matches for the Finland national football team from 1953 to 1958. He was also named in Finland's squad for the Group 2 qualification tournament for the 1954 FIFA World Cup.
