= Aarre Klinga =

Finnish footballer (born 1930)

Personal information
- Date of birth: 28 March 1930

International career
Years	Team	Apps	(Gls)
1953–1959	Finland	9	(0)

Aarre Klinga (born 28 March 1930, date of death unknown) was a Finnish footballer. He played in nine matches for the Finland national football team from 1953 to 1959. He was also named in Finland's squad for the Group 2 qualification tournament for the 1954 FIFA World Cup.
