= Martti Laitinen =

Finnish footballer (1929–2017)

Personal information
- Date of birth: 9 May 1929
- Date of death: 7 February 2017 (aged 87)

International career
Years	Team	Apps	(Gls)
1952–1953	Finland	2	(0)

Martti Laitinen (9 May 1929 – 7 February 2017) was a Finnish footballer. He played in two matches for the Finland national football team from 1952 to 1953. He was also part of Finland's team for their qualification matches for the 1954 FIFA World Cup.
