= Juriaen Jacobsze =

Dutch painter

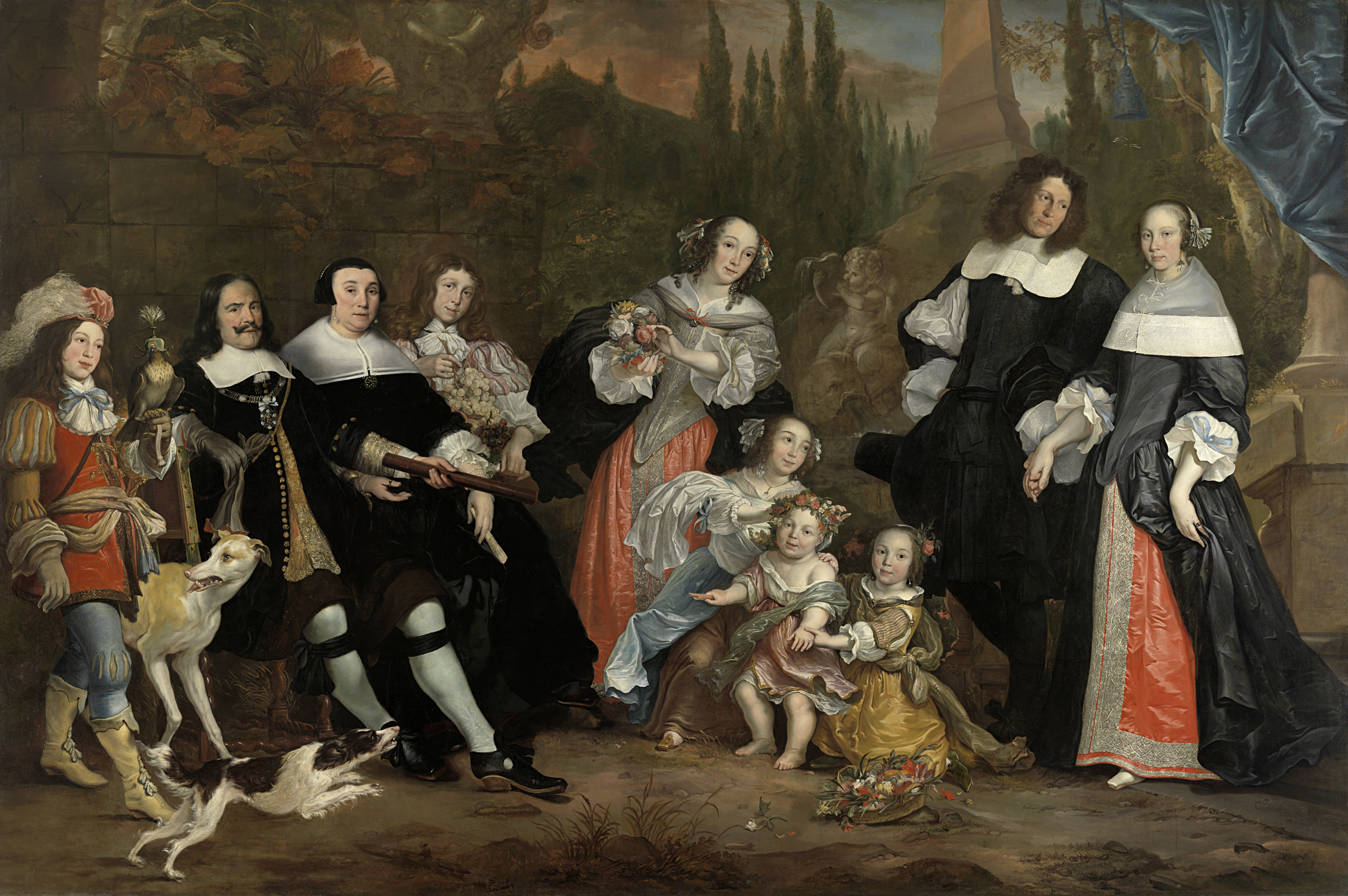
Michiel de Ruyter and his family by Juriaen Jacobsze, 1662

Juriaen Jacobsz, also known as Georg Albert Jacobsz (December 17, 1624, Hamburg – 1685, Leeuwarden), was a Dutch Golden Age portrait and animal painter. He was a pupil of Frans Snyders in Antwerp and a teacher of Hendrik Carré in Leeuwarden. In Leeuwarden he became court painter to Henry Casimir II, Prince of Nassau-Dietz. According to the Netherlands Institute for Art History, he was in Antwerp from 1652 to 1658, in Amsterdam from 1659 to 1664, then travelled to Leeuwarden in 1665, where he stayed. His pupils were Hendrik Carré and David Klöcker Ehrenstrahl.
