= Lennart Holmqvist =

Swedish footballer

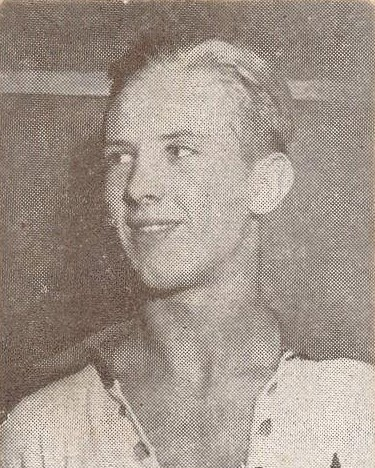
- Lennart Holmqvist with IFK Norrköping, 1950.

Personal information
- Date of birth: 9 January 1933
- Date of death: 14 December 1996 (aged 63)

Senior career*
Years	Team	Apps	(Gls)
- IFK Norrköping

International career
1951–1953	Sweden	2	(0)
- * Club domestic league appearances and goals

Lennart Holmqvist (9 January 1933 – 14 December 1996) was a Swedish footballer. He played in two matches for the Sweden men's national football team from 1951 to 1953. He was also named in Sweden's squad for the Group 2 qualification tournament for the 1954 FIFA World Cup.

Holmqvist played his football for IFK Norrköping.
