= Pekka Kupiainen =

Finnish footballer (1929–2019)

Personal information
- Date of birth: 25 November 1929
- Date of death: 4 March 2019 (aged 89)
- Position: Centre-half

Senior career*
Years	Team	Apps	(Gls)
1951–1955	Kotkan Jäntevä		

International career
1953–1955	Finland	6	(0)
- * Club domestic league appearances and goals

Pekka Kupiainen (25 November 1929 – 4 March 2019) was a Finnish footballer who played as a centre-half. He made six appearances for the Finland national team from 1953 to 1955. He was also part of Finland's team for their qualification matches for the 1954 FIFA World Cup. He played three seasons in Mestaruussarja with Jäntevä Kotka. He played 52 games and scored 2 goals. He also played two seasons in Suomensarja. Kupiainen died on 4 March 2019, at the age of 89.
