= Katharina Rozee =

Dutch artist (1632–1682)

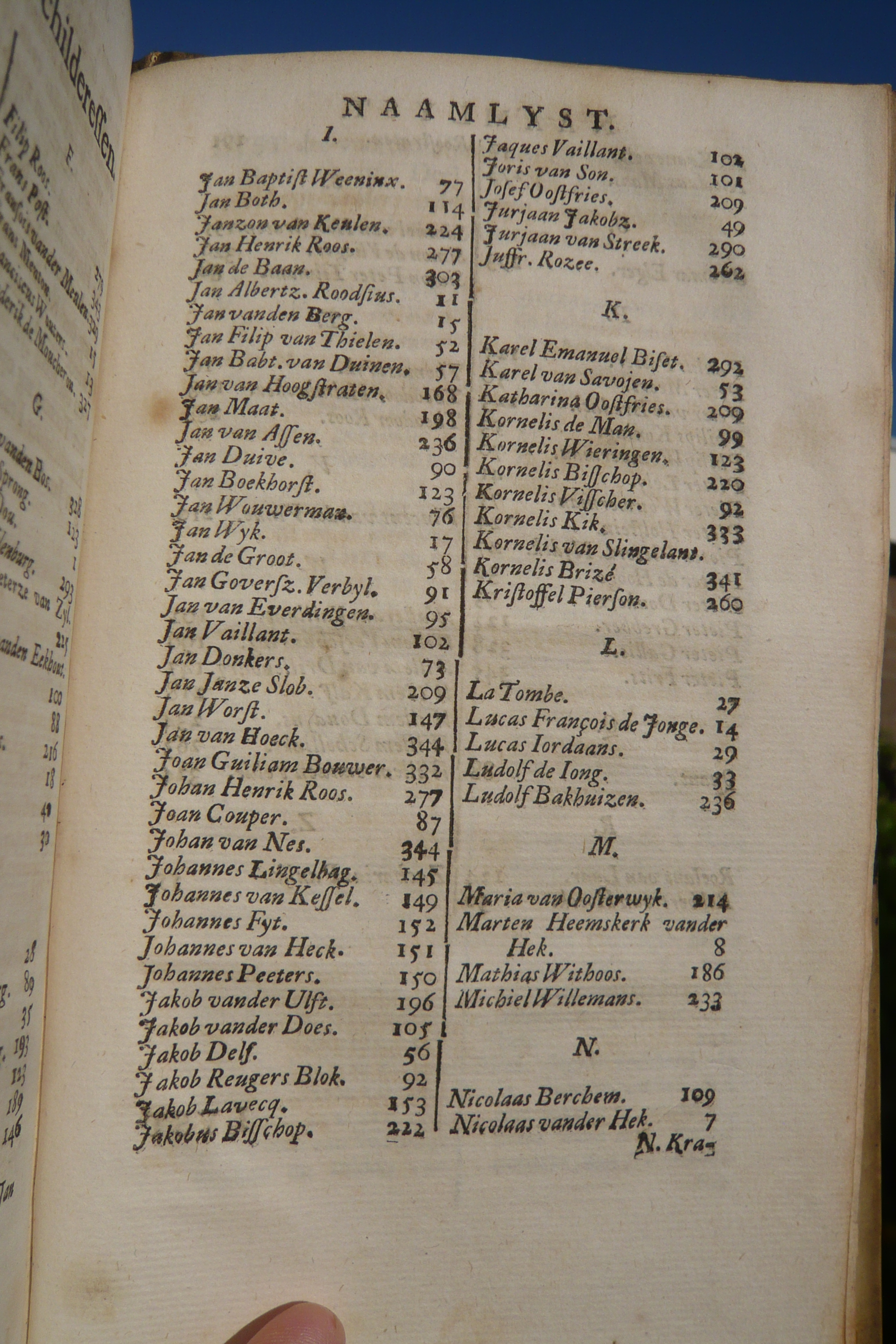
In Arnold Houbraken's De groote schouburgh der Nederlantsche konstschilders en schilderessen from 1719, she is referred to as "Juffr. Rozee".

Katharina, or Catharina Rozee (1632 in Leiden – 1682 in Leiden), was a Dutch Golden Age artist. She is remembered for her ability to create exceptionally realistic images in the medium of embroidery.

== Biography ==
Rozee was born in the city of Leiden in the Netherlands. Accounts of her life claim that she was able to depict landscapes, animals, flowers, and insects with such detail and naturalism that her work was often mistaken for an oil painting. One work in particular, described by the biographer Jacob Weyerman, depicted the trunk of a tree with a spider spinning its web and was said to have sold for “five hundred guilders”. In fact, Rozee's work was so realistic that she was stigmatized as a witch and sorceress.

According to Houbraken she made clever designs with silk fibers on panels of landscapes, animals, flowers and insects that looked so real that they confounded their viewers and common folk claimed she must be a magician. Her works were in great demand, and one of her works with "a landscape with a tree stump and a spider in its web" fetched 500 guilders.

Houbraken's source was Michiel Carré, who told him about a portrait she made with such natural skin tones "that it looked like an oil painting". One of her best works was purchased by the Grand Duke of Florence. She died unmarried at age 50.

Rozee's artwork was owned by well-known figures including Michiel Carré (1657–1747), the court painter of the King of Prussia, and Cosimo III de’ Medici, the Grand Duke of Tuscany. Miss Rozee died at age fifty and no known works survive.
