= Reino Suojanen =

Finnish footballer (1925-2016)

Personal information
- Date of birth: 3 September 1925
- Date of death: 8 March 2016 (aged 90)

International career
Years	Team	Apps	(Gls)
1951–1953	Finland	3	(0)

Reino Suojanen (3 September 1925 – 8 March 2016) was a Finnish footballer. He played in three matches for the Finland national football team from 1951 to 1953. He was also part of Finland's team for their qualification matches for the 1954 FIFA World Cup.
