= Kurt Martin (footballer) =

Finnish footballer (1923-2006)

Personal information
- Date of birth: 13 March 1923
- Place of birth: Vaasa, Finland
- Date of death: 1 November 2006 (aged 83)
- Position: Defender

International career
Years	Team	Apps	(Gls)
- Finland

Kurt Martin (13 March 1923 – 1 November 2006) was a Finnish footballer. He was named in Finland's squad for the Group 2 qualification tournament for the 1954 FIFA World Cup. He was also part of Finland's squad for the 1952 Summer Olympics, but he did not play in any matches.
