= Herbert Sandin =

Swedish footballer(1928

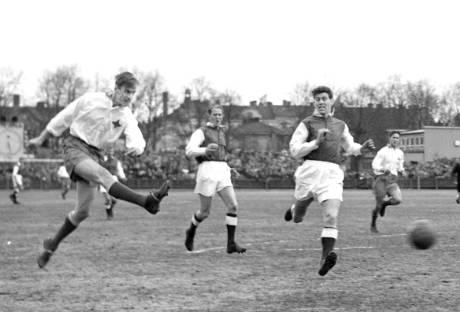
- IFK Norrköping, 1956

Personal information
- Date of birth: 29 February 1928
- Place of birth: Kramfors, Sweden
- Date of death: 27 December 2007 (aged 79)
- Position: Forward

International career
Years	Team	Apps	(Gls)
1951–1953	Sweden	5	(2)

Herbert Sandin (29 February 1928 – 27 December 2007) was a Swedish footballer who played as a forward. He made five appearances for the Sweden national team from 1951 to 1953. He was also named in Sweden's squad for the Group 2 qualification tournament for the 1954 FIFA World Cup.
