= Olavi Lahtinen =

Finnish footballer (1929-1965)

Personal information
- Date of birth: 5 January 1929
- Date of death: 12 May 1965 (aged 36)
- Position: Inside forward

Senior career*
Years	Team	Apps	(Gls)
1948-1958	Helsingin Jalkapalloklubi		
1959-1961	Helsingin Palloseura	49	(9)

International career
1953–1958	Finland	27	(7)
- * Club domestic league appearances and goals

Olavi Lahtinen (5 January 1929 – 12 May 1965) was a Finnish footballer. He played in 27 matches for the Finland national football team from 1953 to 1958. He was also named in Finland's squad for the Group 2 qualification tournament for the 1954 FIFA World Cup. In Mestaruussarja he played 185 games and scored 55 goals. He also scored 44 goals in second level Suomensarja for Helsingin Jalkapalloklubi.
