= François Daenen =

Belgian footballer

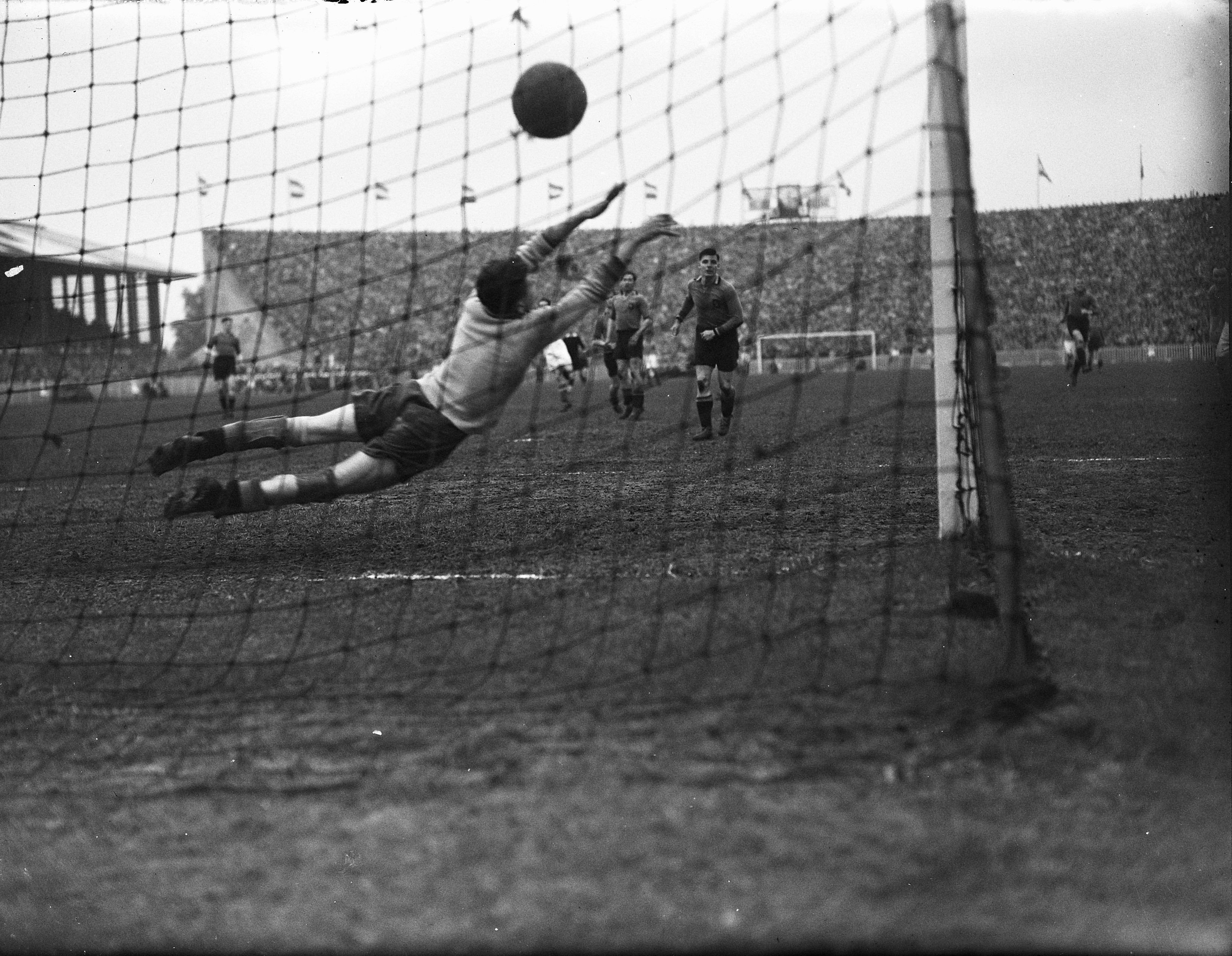

Personal information
- Date of birth: 18 August 1919
- Date of death: 16 April 2001 (aged 81)
- Position: Goalkeeper

International career
Years	Team	Apps	(Gls)
1945–1953	Belgium	17	(0)

François Daenen (18 August 1919 – 16 April 2001) was a Belgian footballer. He played in 17 matches for the Belgium national football team from 1945 to 1953. He was also named in Belgium's squad for the Group 2 qualification tournament for the 1954 FIFA World Cup.
