= Mathieu Bollen =

Belgian footballer

Personal information
- Date of birth: 31 December 1928
- Place of birth: Genk, Belgium
- Date of death: 28 August 2008 (aged 79)
- Position: Midfielder

International career
Years	Team	Apps	(Gls)
1953–1959	Belgium	4	(2)

Mathieu Bollen (31 December 1928 – 28 August 2008) was a Belgian footballer. He played in four matches for the Belgium national football team from 1953 to 1959. He was also named in Belgium's squad for the Group 2 qualification tournament for the 1954 FIFA World Cup.
