= Hervé Carré =

French economist

Hervé Carré (born 24 September 1944) is a French economist and was Eurostat's general director between 2006 and 2008.

== Career ==
After graduating in econometrics in Paris, Carré joined the European Commission in 1973 as an administrator. Between 1988 and 1993, he was the head of both the "national and Community monetary policies" and "international monetary and financial matters" within the Commission. In 1991 he was seconded to the US Federal Reserve Board in Washington, and between 1992 and 1993 he advised the Minister of Finance of Portugal. He then returned to the European Commission in 1994 as Director for monetary matters and became the "Director for Economy of the euro zone and the European Union" between 1999 and 2002. As a member of the Economic and Financial Committee (formerly the Monetary Committee) he was involved in all negotiations concerning the creation of the euro. From 2002 to 2005 he was the minister for economic, financial, and development affairs at the Delegation of the European Commission in Washington D.C. In 2005, he became the Deputy Director-General of the Directorate General for Economic and Financial Affairs. On 18 May 2006 he became Director-General of Eurostat. His background in econometrics and extensive experience in monetary and financial policies of the European Union gave him excellence for guiding Eurostat's affairs.

== Bibliography ==
- Biography - European Commission website
