= Augustin Janssens =

Belgian footballer (born 1930)

Personal information
- Date of birth: 24 September 1930
- Position: Forward

Senior career*
Years	Team	Apps	(Gls)
- Union SG
- Daring Club de Bruxelles
- Olympic Charleroi

International career
1952–1956	Belgium	9	(1)
- * Club domestic league appearances and goals

Augustin Janssens (born 24 September 1930) is a Belgian former footballer who played as a forward. He made nine appearances for the Belgium national team from 1952 to 1956. He was also named in Belgium's squad for the Group 2 qualification tournament for the 1954 FIFA World Cup.
