= Jean-Louis Straetmans =

Belgian footballer (1931–2016)

Personal information
- Date of birth: 26 September 1931
- Place of birth: Woluwe-Saint-Pierre, Belgium
- Date of death: 9 October 2016 (aged 85)
- Position: Forward

Senior career*
Years	Team	Apps	(Gls)
1949–1963	White Star Woluwé		
1963–1964	RWS Bruxelles		

International career
1952–1956	Belgium	5	(2)
- * Club domestic league appearances and goals

Jean-Louis Straetmans (26 September 1931 – 9 October 2016) was a Belgian footballer who played as a forward. He made five appearances for the Belgium national team from 1952 to 1956.

== Club career ==
Straetmans was born in Woluwe-Saint-Pierre. He scored 151 goals in 273 matches in the Belgian Second Division for White Star, ranking fifth in the list of the league's top scorers as of 2008. He never played in the first tier.

He retired from playing in 1959, after breaking his heel when he fell from a scaffolding while working as a painter.

== International career ==
Named in Belgium's squad for the Group 2 qualification tournament for the 1954 FIFA World Cup, he scored goals that helped Belgium achieve qualification for the World Cup before missing out on the tournament through injury.

== Personal life and death ==
After his retirement from playing Straetmans worked as a sporting director for White Star and Racing White.

He was married to Monique Noël and owned a painting shop.

He died on 9 October 2016, at the age of 85.
