= Géraldine Carré =

French journalist and television presenter (1969–2024)

- Born: 15 September 1969; Lyon, France
- Died: 3 May 2024 (aged 54); Mallorca, Spain
- Education: Diplôme national de licence
- Occupations: Journalist; Television presenter

Géraldine Carré (15 September 1969 – 3 May 2024) was a French journalist and television presenter. She was also a voice actress, providing dubs for documentaries and advertisements. She published a book on motherhood with Alix Girod de l'Ain in 1998.

Carré began her career on radio in 1990 on Europe 2 and hosted shows until 2002. In 1994, she joined television on Paris Première, TF1, and France 2, and Canal+.

== Biography ==
Born in Lyon on 15 September 1969, Carré completed her secondary education in 1987 before earning a Diplôme national de licence in modern literature. She joined the Agence France Presse in 1988 and lived in Lyon, doing freelance journalism with local newspapers and magazines. She then hosted two daily shows for Europe 2 once she joined radio: Sortir and Vas-y, moi j'en viens. In addition to her time at Europe 2, she also held a stint at Europe 1.

In 1994, Carré joined television with Paris Première, hosting a weekly talk show titled Tout-Paris. In 1996, she joined the set of Télé qua non on France 2 with Christophe Dechavanne. The following year, she joined Daniela Lumbroso on Et si ça vous arrivait for TF1. From 2001 to 2003, she hosted Confessions intimes on TF1. From September 2003 to June 2004, she presented the daily show La vie en clair on Canal+, a show produced by Réservoir Prod.

Carré was married to Patrick Bauer and was the mother of four children. She lived in Mallorca, Spain, and died there from cancer in May 2024, at the age of 54.
