= Career (disambiguation) =

A career is an individual's journey through learning, work and other aspects of life.

Career or Careers may also refer to:

- Career (1938 film), a 1938 Swedish drama film
- Career (1939 film), a 1939 American drama film
- Career (1959 film), a 1959 American drama film
- Career (play), a 1956 play by James Lee, later made into the 1959 film
- Careers (film), a 1929 drama film
- Careers (album), a 2014 album by the American duo Beverly
- Careers (board game), a board game first manufactured by Parker Brothers in 1955
- "Career" (Shifting Gears), an episode of the American TV series Shifting Gears

== See also ==
- Career criminal
- Career soldier
