= Marie Carré =

French nun and writer

Personal details
- Born: 1905 Unknown
- Died: c. 1984 Unknown
- Profession: Writer

Marie Carré (1905-1984) was a French nurse who later in life converted from Protestantism to become Roman Catholic nun. She is known primarily in the English-speaking world for having published a purported memoir entitled AA-1025: The Memoirs of an Anti-Apostle, which some consider to be Traditionalist Catholic propaganda.

== Life ==
Carré grew up a Calvinist Protestant in France. In 1964, she converted to Catholicism and became a nun much later in life. A picture of Carré was made available on the Internet by Chiré: Diffusion de la Pensee Francaise.

== AA-1025: The Memoirs of an Anti-Apostle ==
Carré claimed that, while working as a nurse in a Paris hospital in the late 1960s, a severely injured man, who had a Slavic look, was brought in after being in a car accident. Carré alleged that she tried to communicate with the man to ask him some questions but he didn't or couldn't respond. She even tried to get him to answer her questions by blinking his eyes but he didn't. The man survived for a few hours before he succumbed to his injuries. Having no form of identification Carré was instructed to go through his belongings in order to possibly identify him. She did not succeed in discovering his name, but she did allegedly discover in his briefcase a 100-page-typed memoir. She began reading the papers partly to find some information to identify him and partly out of curiosity.

The memoir claimed that he was an undercover agent of the Soviet Union ordered to infiltrate the Catholic Church by becoming a priest and to advance modernist ideas through a teaching position that would undermine the main teachings of the Church during the Second Vatican Council in subtle ways, by turn of phrase methods. The document gave details and even told of a murder of a priest he had committed in order to get his way. No one ever claimed his belongings and Carré eventually decided to publish the memoir. It was printed in France in May 1972 and eventually was translated into several other languages.

== Criticism ==
In a 2002 critique of Catholic conspiracy theories for Crisis magazine, Sandra Miesel wrote:

Further evidence of faith in Communist trickiness is the persistent popularity of Anti-Apostle 1025 by Marie Carré, originally published in France in 1972. This purports to be a memoir by the 1025th Red to penetrate Catholic seminaries, but it is manifestly a feeble example of radical traditionalist propaganda that even fails to factor in the Russian purges. The main character is a Polish orphan—the careful reader will note he’s a Jew—recruited by a Soviet spymaster between the World Wars to penetrate and subvert the Catholic Church.

The article was taken down in 2016 by Crisis editor Michael Warren Davis upon the request of The Remnant editor Michael Matt, though it can still be found on the Internet Archive through the Wayback Machine. Matt had described the article as "yellow journalism", calling it "uncharitable in the extreme, if not libelous" and a "slanderous, SPLC-accommodating rant".

Catholic philosopher and theologian Alice von Hildebrand argues that:

AA-1025 may be a literary invention of Marie Carre, but one must admit that she hits the bull's eye from the first page to the last. Some people have extraordinary talents to foresee the future. Carre certainly had an extraordinary perception of how best to harm the Church. How surprising indeed that all her inventions have become reality in the post-conciliar Church.

Von Hildebrand received a detailed response by Miesel, who stated that:

No one ever wrote a memoir the way this book is written. Important events could not have occurred as described. The protagonist couldn’t have crossed the sealed Polish-Russian border in 1931. He couldn’t have been reporting to the same intelligence handler throughout the Russian purges (which are never mentioned) and World War II (during the 1,000-day siege of Leningrad). His account of meeting the spy “chief” contains not a word of hard description, somehow failing to notice that the unnamed Yezhov was a dwarf. Moreover, the protagonist never uses a word of Marxist jargon.

It hardly took much prophetic skill to “predict” the vernacular Mass in 1972 when AA-1025 was written. As for “hitting the bull’s eye from the first page to the last,” do we have ordained fathers and mothers celebrating Mass on the family table before dinner every night? Are the naves of our churches filled with communion tables for groups of twelve? Have we abolished infant baptism, marriage ceremonies, private confession, vestments, altar cloths, candles, the Sign of the Cross, the Sunday Mass obligation, the term “Catholic”? Are believers in union with the pope ever likely to do so? As I said, AA-1025 is a fable seething with hatred of ecumenism. I don’t understand why someone of Dr. von Hildebrand’s stature would give it a second glance.

== Death ==
Carré died in France in 1984.

== Bibliography ==
- Les J3 Contre Lucifer (French, 1958, Coutances, Éditions Notre-Dame).
- La Belle et la mort (French, Paris, Mignard, 1962).
- J'ai choisi l'unité (French, 1964, Apostolat des Éditions).
- Les mémoires d'une jeune fille gaie (French, 1965, Paris, Nouvelles Éditions Debresse).
- Yo escogí la unidad (Spanish, 1968, Edic. Paulinas).
- Vie de Jésus (French, 1970, Ed. Saint Michel; Extrait de "Itinéraires". 117–128, novembre 1967-décembre 1968).
- La messe. Lettre ouverte à Jésus de Nazareth en Galilée (French, 1973, Ed. Diffusion de la Pensée Française).
- Es 1025, ou les mémoires d'un anti-apôtre (French, 1973).
- L'Islam et nous (French, 1975, Paris : La Pensée universelle).
- Es 1025 ou les memoires d'un Anti-Apôtre (French, 1978, Éditions Du Chiré, Chiré-en-Montreuil France).
- Dood aan de kerk of de gedenkschriften van een tegenapostel : ES 1025 (Dutch, 1973, Gent, Leven en Aktie).
- Le Pasteur des Pasteurs (French, 1980, Ed. Paris, TEQUI).
- AA-1025: The Memoirs of an Anti-Apostle (English, 1991, TAN Books).

== See also ==
- Bella Dodd
