= Carré =

Carré is a French word, which means "square". Carré may also refer to:

== People ==
- Carré (surname)
- Carré Otis, American model and actress

== Places ==
- Fort Carré, sixteenth-century fort in France
- Vieux Carré, French Quarter of New Orleans
- Chapeau Carré, second highest peak on the island of Carriacou in the Grenada Grenadines
- Chapeau Carré, populated place near Boucan-Carré, Haiti
- Bonnet Carré Spillway, a flood control structure near New Orleans, Louisiana

== Other ==
- Carré Theatre, one of the leading theatres in the Netherlands, founded by Oscar Carré
- Carré (Stockhausen), composition for four orchestras and four choirs by Karlheinz Stockhausen
- Carré, an infantry battle formation, more usually known as the infantry square
- A type of bet in Roulette

== See also ==
Carrè

- Carle (disambiguation)
- Carrè, town in Italy

Carrée

- Equirectangular projection, also known as plate carrée
- Maison Carrée, temple at Nîmes in southern France
- French name for the double whole note, which has a rectangular notehead in mensural notation
