= Jean Nicolas Louis Carré =

French general

Jean Nicolas Louis Carré (19 February 1770 – 1845) was a French general. He held the rank of maréchal de camp.
