= Antoine Carré (guitarist) =

Late 17th-century French guitarist and composer

- Occupations: guitarist and composer
- Known for: baroque guitar

Antoine Carré (also Anthoine, fl. late 17th century) was a baroque guitarist and composer. He published two books of guitar tablatures.

== Works ==
The first book is titled Livre de Guitarre Contenant Plusieurs pièces Composées et mises au Jour par le Sieur De La Grange Avec La Manière de toucher sur La Partie ou basse Continüe, published in Paris in 1671 and is dedicated to the Princess Sophia of the Palatinate. The second book, Livre de Pièces de Guitarre et de Musique, Comparé et mis au jour Par Anthoine Carré Sieur Delagrange was also published in Paris (c. 1675, 1690 or 1720; but probably between 1675 and 1690).
