= Louis Carré (footballer) =

Belgian footballer and coach

Personal information
- Full name: Louis Aimé Carré
- Date of birth: 7 January 1925
- Place of birth: Liège, Belgium
- Date of death: 10 June 2002 (aged 77)
- Place of death: Liège, Belgium
- Height: 1.79 m (5 ft 10 in)
- Position: Defensive midfielder

Senior career*
Years	Team	Apps	(Gls)
1945–1959	RFC de Liège	416	(1)

International career
1948–1958	Belgium	56	(0)

Managerial career
- 1982: RFC de Liège
- * Club domestic league appearances and goals

Louis Aimé Carré (French pronunciation: [lwi kaʁe]; 7 January 1925 – 10 June 2002) was a Belgian football player and coach. As a player, Carré played at both professional and international levels as a defensive midfielder, before becoming a coach.

== Career ==
Carré played at club level for RFC de Liège between 1945 and 1959, making 416 appearances.

Carré also played at international level for Belgium, earning 56 caps between 1948 and 1958, and participating at the 1954 FIFA World Cup.

Carré later became a football coach, and managed RFC de Liège briefly in 1982.

== Honours ==
RFC Liège

- Belgian First Division: 1951–52, 1952–53
