= Franciscus Carree =

Dutch painter

Franciscus Carree or Frans Carré (ca. 1630 - 1669) was a Dutch painter.

He was either born in Leeuwarden or Antwerp. In 1649 he married Janneke Padtbrugge in The Hague where he became a member of the guild, and spent most of his career. Between 1658 and 1661 he lived in Amsterdam. It is not known who was his instructor, but he grew to be sufficiently esteemed to be appointed first painter to the Stadtholder William Frederick in Leeuwarden in 1664. He excelled in painting landscapes and village festivals, but his works are little known outside his own country. He left an etching of the funeral catafalque of the Stadtholder in November 1664. He died at Amsterdam, The Hague, or Leeuwarden in 1669.
