= Henri Coppens =

Belgian footballer

Rik Coppens
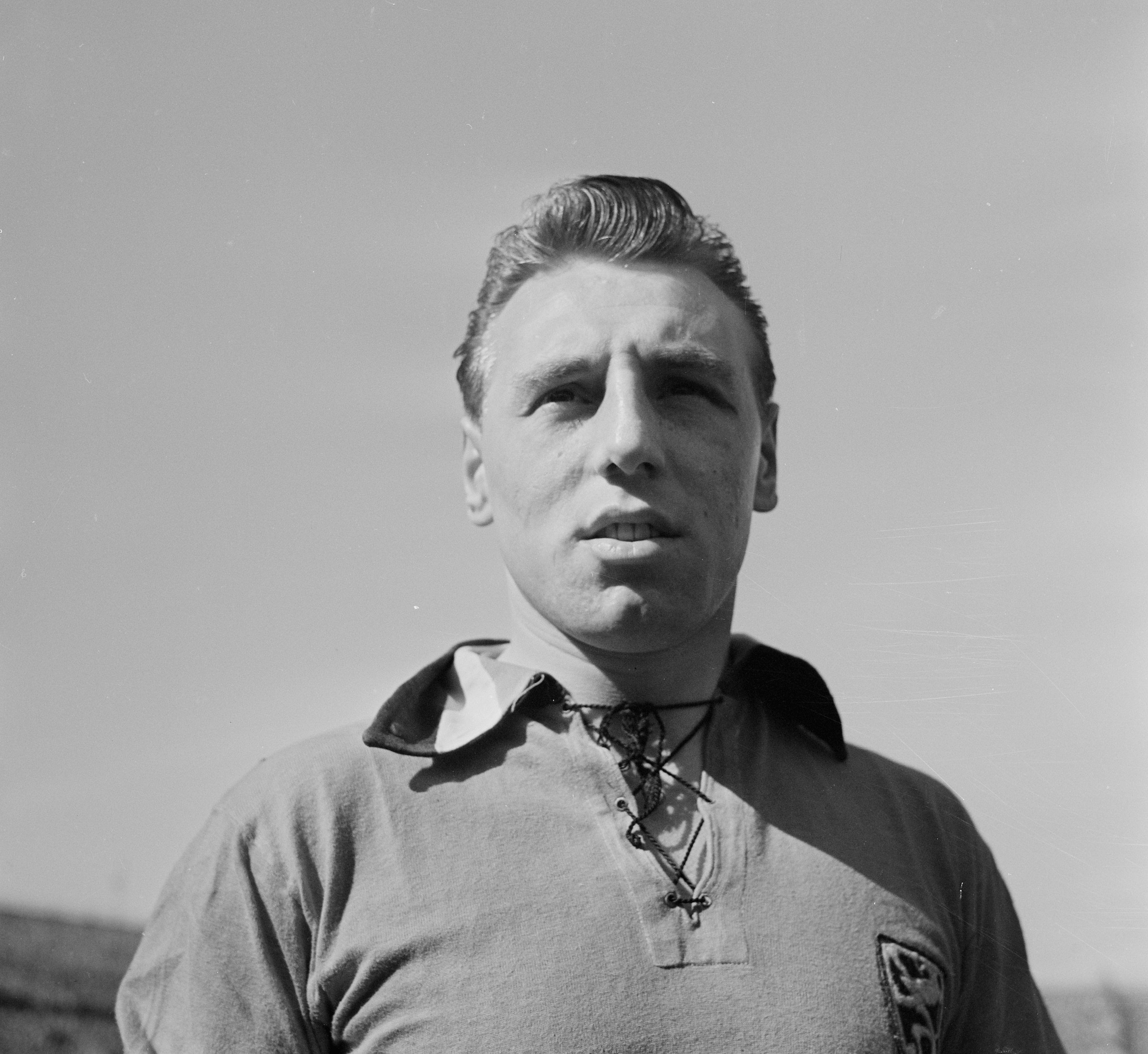
- Coppens in 1953

Personal information
- Full name: Henri François Louis Coppens
- Date of birth: 29 April 1930
- Place of birth: Antwerp, Belgium
- Date of death: 5 February 2015 (aged 84)
- Place of death: Wilrijk, Belgium
- Position: Striker

Senior career*
Years	Team	Apps	(Gls)
1946–1961	K. Beerschot V.A.C.	389	(261)
1961–1962	Olympique Charleroi	27	(3)
1962–1967	RWD Molenbeek	121	(32)
1967–1969	Berchem Sport	45	(8)
1969–1970	Tubantia Borgerhout VK		
Total		555	(301)

International career
1949–1959	Belgium	47	(21)

Managerial career
- 1971–1974: Berchem Sport
- 1974–1978: K. Beerschot V.A.C.
- 1978–1981: Berchem Sport
- 1981–1982: Club Brugge
- 1982–1984: K. Beerschot V.A.C.
- * Club domestic league appearances and goals

Henri 'Rik' François Louis Coppens (29 April 1930 – 5 February 2015) was a Belgian footballer who played as a striker. He played 389 games and scored 261 goals for Beerschot AC. Coppens won the first Belgian Golden Shoe in 1954. After his career as a player, he became a coach with Tubantia Borgerhout (1970–1971), Berchem (1971–1974 and 1977–1981), Beerschot (1974–1977 and 1981–1984) and Club Brugge (1981).

== Honours ==
=== Individual ===
- Belgian First Division top scorer: 1952-53 (35 goals), 1954-55 (35 goals)
- Belgian Golden Shoe: 1954
- Belgian Golden Shoe of the 20th Century: 4th place
- Voetbal International's 50 World Stars by Raf Willems (1999)
- Platina Eleven (Best Team in 50 Years of Golden Shoe Winners) (2003)
