= Léopold Anoul =

Belgian footballer

Pol Anoul

Personal information
- Full name: Léopold René Jean Victor Anoul
- Date of birth: 19 August 1922
- Place of birth: Saint-Nicolas, Liège, Belgium
- Date of death: 5 February 1990 (aged 67)
- Place of death: Liège, Belgium
- Height: 1.76 m (5 ft 9 1/2 in)
- Position: Forward

Senior career*
Years	Team	Apps	(Gls)
1939–1942	Saint-Nicolas FC	?	(?)
1942–1957	RFC Liège	361	(134)
1957–1960	Standard Liège	38	(6)
Total		399	(140)

International career
1947–1954	Belgium	48	(20)
- * Club domestic league appearances and goals

Léopold "Pol" Anoul (19 August 1922 – 11 February 1990) was a Belgian footballer.

During his club career he played for Royal FC Liégeois (1942–1957) and Standard Liège (1957–1960). From 1947 to 1954, he earned 48 caps and scored 20 goals for the Belgium national football team, including 3 goals in the 1954 FIFA World Cup.

His nickname was "l'homme de Colombes" (the man from Colombes) after a wonderful goal he scored for Belgium against France in the stadium of Colombes near Paris.

== Honours ==
RFC Liège

- Belgian First Division: 1951–52, 1952–53
- Belgian Second Division: 1943–44
- Belgian Third Division: 1942–43

Standard Liège

- Belgian First Division: 1957–58
