= List of Denmark international footballers (1–24 caps) =

List of Danish footballers

This is a list of Denmark international footballers – football players who have played in one to 24 matches for the Denmark men's national football team.

== Key ==
	Tournament medalists at the: 1908 OG – 1908 Olympic Games - (silver) Runners-up; 1912 OG – 1912 Olympic Games - (silver) Runners-up; 1948 OG – 1948 Olympic Games - (bronze) Third place; 1960 OG – 1960 Olympic Games - (silver) Runners-up; 1992 EC – 1992 European Championship - (gold) Winners; 1995 CC – 1995 Confederations Cup - (gold) Winners
**Bold**	Currently available for selection. Correct as of 1 October 2026.
Pos	Positions
GK	Goalkeeper
DF	Defender
MF	Midfielder
FW	Forward

== List of players ==
Name	Pos.	First cap	Last cap	Caps	Goals	Medals
Carl Aage Præst	FW	1945	1949	24	17	
Brian Priske	DF	2003	2007	24	0	
Kenneth Perez	MF	2003	2008	24	2	
Niki Zimling	MF	2008	2014	24	1	
Jørgen Hansen	FW	1955	1962	23	3	
Per Frandsen	MF	1990	2003	23	0	
Riza Durmisi	DF	2015	2018	23	0	
**Alexander Bah**	DF	2020	2026	23	1	
Edvin Frigast Larsen	GK	1921	1929	22	0	
Karl Aage Hansen	FW	1943	1948	22	17	
Erik Sandvad	MF	1967	1971	22	0	
Kresten Bjerre	MF	1967	1973	22	12	
Lars Larsen	DF	1974	1979	22	0	
Peter Løvenkrands	FW	2002	2010	22	1	
Nicolai Boilesen	DF	2011	2022	22	1	
Knud Christophersen	DF	1929	1934	21	6	
Johannes Pløger	FW	1940	1948	21	8	
Erik Køppen	DF	1949	1956	21	0	
Jens Petersen	MF	1962	1964	21	1	
Henning Jensen	FW	1972	1980	21	9	
Viktor Fischer	FW	2012	2018	21	3	
Sophus Nielsen	FW	1908	1919	20	16	1908 OG (silver); 1912 OG (silver)
Christen Brøgger	DF	1952	1956	20	0	
Erik Pondal Jensen	MF	1954	1959	20	0	
Erling Linde Larsen	DF	1956	1959	20	0	
John Madsen	MF	1961	1963	20	0	
Kaj Johansen	DF	1962	1963	20	0	
Carl Bertelsen	FW	1962	1964	20	9	
Bent Jensen	FW	1968	1972	20	13	
Flemming Lund	FW	1972	1979	20	2	
Bjørn Kristensen	DF	1987	1993	20	2	
Peter Møller	FW	1991	2005	20	5	
Claus Thomsen	MF	1995	1999	20	0	
Søren Larsen	FW	2005	2010	20	11	
Leon Andreasen	MF	2007	2014	20	3	
Alf Olsen	FW	1912	1926	19	8	
Tom Søndergaard	FW	1964	1967	19	4	
Finn Laudrup	FW	1967	1979	19	6	
Mogens Therkildsen	GK	1971	1973	19	0	
Jørgen Kristensen	FW	1971	1978	19	3	
Birger Jensen	GK	1973	1979	19	0	
John Larsen	DF	1984	1990	19	1	
Kim Christofte	DF	1984	1992	19	1	(gold) 1992 EC
Jakob Friis-Hansen	DF	1990	1996	19	0	
Mikkel Beck	FW	1995	2000	19	3	
Jan Michaelsen	MF	2000	2004	19	1	
Vilhelm Wolfhagen	FW	1908	1917	18	14	1908 OG (silver); 1912 OG (silver)
Eigil Thielsen	FW	1933	1942	18	6	
Egon Sørensen	GK	1937	1945	18	0	
Knud Bastrup-Birk	DF	1943	1951	18	0	
Axel Pilmark	MF	1947	1950	18	1	
Dion Ørnvold	MF	1947	1951	18	0	
Jørgen Wagner Hansen	FW	1947	1952	18	5	
Ove Flindt Bjerg	FW	1970	1979	18	1	
Hans Ewald Hansen	MF	1971	1974	18	1	
Ole Madsen	DF	1980	1984	18	0	
Miklos Molnar	FW	1990	2000	18	2	
Michael Gravgaard	DF	2005	2007	18	5	
**Jesper Lindstrøm**	MF	2020	2025	18	1	
**Victor Kristiansen**	DF	2023	2025	18	0	
**Victor Nelsson**	DF	2020	2026	18	0	
Georg Brysting	DF	1912	1918	17	0	
Holger Seebach	FW	1947	1953	17	9	
Erik Terkelsen	MF	1950	1957	17	0	
Leif Hartwig	DF	1964	1966	17	0	
John Steen Olsen	FW	1966	1973	17	3	
Knud Engedal	GK	1968	1969	17	0	
Jack Hansen	MF	1971	1975	17	1	
John Andersen	DF	1975	1979	17	0	
John Eriksen	FW	1981	1988	17	6	
Pierre Larsen	MF	1983	1988	17	0	
Per Frimann	FW	1983	1989	17	1	
Kasper Bøgelund	DF	2002	2008	17	0	
**Gustav Isaksen**	FW	2024	2026	17	7	
Anton Olsen	FW	1912	1927	16	14	1912 OG (silver)
Harry Bendixen	DF	1924	1928	16	1	
Poul Andersen	DF	1952	1957	16	0	
Tommy Troelsen	FW	1959	1968	16	5	
Flemming Mortensen	DF	1968	1977	16	0	
Ole Bjørnmose	MF	1971	1977	16	2	
Benno Larsen	GK	1974	1977	16	0	
Allan Hansen	MF	1977	1985	16	3	
Kenneth Brylle	FW	1980	1988	16	2	
Johnny Mølby	MF	1989	1993	16	0	(gold) 1992 EC
**Patrick Dorgu**	DF	2024	2026	16	4	
Nils Middelboe	MF	1908	1920	15	7	1908 OG (silver); 1912 OG (silver)
Vilhelm Jørgensen	DF	1917	1923	15	0	
Viggo Jensen	MF	1945	1948	15	1	
Poul Erik Petersen	FW	1950	1953	15	6	
Erik Lykke Sørensen	GK	1963	1971	15	0	
Leif Sørensen	FW	1964	1969	15	3	
Keld Pedersen	FW	1965	1973	15	3	
Henning Boel	DF	1966	1971	15	0	
Niels-Christian Holmstrøm	FW	1968	1976	15	4	
Niels Tune	DF	1975	1978	15	1	
Torben Piechnik	DF	1991	1996	15	0	(gold) 1992 EC
**Victor Froholdt**	MF	15	1	2025	2026	
Oskar Nørland	FW	1908	1916	14	0	1908 OG (silver); 1912 OG (silver)
Einar Larsen	FW	1923	1929	14	3	
Harald Lyngsaa	FW	1940	1950	14	2	
Jørgen Leschly Sørensen	FW	1946	1949	14	8	
Edvin Hansen	DF	1948	1951	14	3	
Per Henriksen	GK	1953	1956	14	0	
Harald Nielsen	FW	1959	1960	14	15	
Erik Gaardhøje	GK	1961	1963	14	0	
Finn Wiberg	FW	1966	1970	14	5	
Keld Bak	FW	1966	1972	14	3	
Birger Pedersen	MF	1970	1972	14	1	
Claus Nielsen	FW	1986	1991	14	7	
Jakob Kjeldbjerg	DF	1992	1994	14	1	
**Robert Skov**	MF	2019	2023	14	7	
Svend Aage Castella	DF	1911	1916	13	1	1912 OG (silver)
Viggo Jørgensen	FW	1920	1926	13	6	
Poul Toft Jensen	MF	1935	1938	13	0	
Svend Nielsen	DF	1950	1952	13	2	
Niels Møller	MF	1966	1970	13	0	
Peter Rasmussen	FW	1989	1996	13	2	
Jens Risager	DF	1994	1996	13	0	
Peter Madsen	FW	2001	2005	13	3	
Morten Rasmussen	FW	2008	2016	13	4	
Nicklas Pedersen	FW	2010	2013	13	1	
Ove Jensen	GK	1945	1948	12	0	
Ove Andersen	FW	1955	1965	12	5	
Egon Jensen	MF	1957	1966	12	4	
Birger Larsen	DF	1963	1966	12	0	
John Worbye	DF	1966	1967	12	0	
Johnny Hansen	MF	1987	1991	12	0	
Søren Andersen	FW	1993	2000	12	0	
Rasmus Würtz	MF	2005	2014	12	0	
**Mohamed Daramy**	FW	2021	2026	12	1	
Poul Zølck	DF	1927	1931	11	0	
Søren Jensen	DF	1931	1933	11	0	
Børge Mathiesen	MF	1937	1945	11	1	
Kaj Jørgensen	GK	1950	1956	11	0	
Børge Bastholm Larsen	DF	1954	1959	11	0	
Poul Andersen	DF	1955	1960	11	0	
Karl Hansen	DF	1964	1965	11	0	
Børge Enemark	MF	1965	1969	11	0	
Kaj Paulsen	GK	1969	1970	11	0	
Jan Johnsen Sørensen	FW	1977	1980	11	3	
Michael Manniche	FW	1981	1987	11	2	
Flemming Christensen	FW	1982	1989	11	2	
Morten Bruun	MF	1990	1992	11	0	(gold) 1992 EC
Frank Pingel	FW	1991	1994	11	5	
Jan Kristiansen	MF	2003	2007	11	0	
Jesper Christiansen	GK	2005	2010	11	0	
Thomas Enevoldsen	MF	2009	2011	11	1	
Lasse Vibe	MF	2014	2017	11	1	
Otto Larsen	FW	1918	1923	10	0	
Walther Christensen	MF	1939	1942	10	1	
Egon Johansen	DF	1940	1947	10	0	
Kurt Præst	FW	1968	1970	10	0	
Erik Nielsen	DF	1969	1971	10	0	
Jørgen Markussen	FW	1970	1972	10	1	
Eigil Nielsen	FW	1971	1975	10	0	
Helge Vonsyld	DF	1973	1974	10	0	
Lars Lundkvist	FW	1978	1983	10	1	
Morten Donnerup	MF	1982	1986	10	1	
Ejner Rahbek	DF	1983	1988	10	0	
Ulrik Moseby	MF	1987	1989	10	2	
Mogens Krogh	GK	1992	1998	10	0	(gold) 1992 EC
Peter Nielsen	MF	1992	2002	10	1	(gold) 1992 EC
Per Nielsen	DF	2002	2006	10	0	
Frederik Rønnow	GK	2016	2024	10	0	
**Lukas Lerager**	MF	2017	2019	10	1	
**Albert Grønbæk**	FW	2024	2026	10	1	

=== 1-9 caps ===
Name	Pos.	Caps	Goals	First cap	Last cap	Medals
Leo Dannin	FW	9	0	1920	1922	
Hans Steffensen	MF	9	0	1933	1935	
Alex Friedmann	FW	9	2	1937	1942	
Jørgen Johansen	GK	9	0	1952	1953	
John Amdisen	DF	9	0	1955	1961	
Ove Hansen	DF	9	0	1956	1957	
Eyvind Clausen	FW	9	3	1962	1963	
Preben Arentoft	MF	9	0	1965	1971	
Jørgen Jørgensen	FW	9	1	1966	1975	
Niels Sørensen	MF	9	1	1974	1975	
Peter Poulsen	MF	9	0	1976	1979	
Jens Steffensen	DF	9	1	1976	1980	
Klaus Nørregaard	MF	9	1	1977	1980	
Frank Olsen	DF	9	0	1979	1981	
Henrik Eigenbrod	DF	9	2	1981	1984	
Mark Strudal	FW	9	3	1988	1995	
Henrik Risom	DF	9	0	1989	1992	
Steven Lustü	DF	9	0	2000	2005	
Martin Vingaard	MF	9	1	2008	2011	
**Christian Gytkjær**	FW	9	5	2016	2019	
**Mika Biereth**	FW	9	1	2025	2025	
**Anders Dreyer**	FW	9	3	2021	2026	
Sven Knudsen	FW	8	3	1913	1916	
Sofus Johansen	MF	8	0	1925	1931	
Carl Stoltz	FW	8	3	1925	1936	
Palle Christensen	DF	8	0	1926	1928	
Børge Havn	DF	8	0	1927	1929	
Børge Overgaard	MF	8	0	1945	1948	
John Hansen	FW	8	10	1948	1948	
Steen Blicher	MF	8	0	1951	1952	
Ove Bech Nielsen	FW	8	3	1954	1958	
Mogens Berg	FW	8	1	1964	1971	
Poul Bilde	FW	8	0	1965	1968	
Bent Schmidt Hansen	FW	8	0	1966	1967	
Steen Rømer	FW	8	4	1968	1969	
Jan Andersen	FW	8	0	1969	1970	
Allan Michaelsen	MF	8	1	1969	1972	
Flemming Pedersen	DF	8	0	1970	1972	
Peter Dahl	FW	8	3	1971	1975	
Viggo Jensen	MF	8	0	1971	1973	
Peter Dahl	FW	8	3	1971	1975	
Lars Høgh	GK	8	0	1983	1995	
Morten Bisgaard	FW	8	1	1996	2000	
Thomas Røll Larsen	MF	8	1	2002	2004	
Thomas Rasmussen	DF	8	0	2003	2008	
Nicolai Stokholm	MF	8	0	2006	2013	
Morten Nordstrand	FW	8	3	2007	2009	
Tobias Mikkelsen	FW	8	1	2011	2012	
Jores Okore	DF	8	0	2011	2014	
Casper Sloth	MF	8	0	2012	2014	
Kasper Kusk	MF	8	0	2013	2014	
**Jacob Bruun Larsen**	FW	8	1	2019	2025	
Charles Buchwald	DF	7	0	1908	1912	1908 OG (silver); 1912 OG (silver)
Harald Hansen	DF	7	0	1908	1912	1908 OG (silver); 1912 OG (silver)
Gunnar Aaby	MF	7	1	1918	1921	
Carl Hansen	FW	7	3	1918	1921	
Samuel Thorsteinsson	MF	7	1	1918	1919	
Aage Jørgensen	MF	7	0	1923	1929	
Ejnar Andersen	DF	7	0	1933	1937	
Hilmar Staalgaard	FW	7	2	1941	1951	
Niels Bennike	FW	7	0	1945	1950	
Erik Hansen	MF	7	1	1951	1953	
Dan Ohland-Andersen	DF	7	0	1951	1957	
Kaj Hansen	DF	7	0	1963	1967	
Leif Printzlau	FW	7	1	1968	1972	
Per Poulsen	GK	7	0	1974	1978	
Bjarne Pettersson	FW	7	3	1974	1980	
Kurt Hansen	FW	7	1	1976	1978	
Jan Ingemann Sørensen	FW	7	0	1976	1979	
Brian Chrøis	MF	7	1	1983	1984	
Marc Nygaard	FW	7	0	2000	2008	
Mads Junker	FW	7	1	2006	2012	
Mikkel Beckmann	MF	7	0	2008	2011	
Thomas Kristensen	MF	7	0	2008	2012	
Mike Jensen	MF	7	0	2010	2018	
**Lucas Andersen**	FW	7	0	2014	2020	
**Jonas Knudsen**	DF	7	0	2014	2019	
**Kasper Høgh**	FW	7	1	2026	2026	
Svend Knudsen	MF	6	0	1918	1919	
Georg Taarup	FW	6	2	1932	1934	
Sigfred Jensen	MF	6	0	1933	1939	
Henry Nielsen	FW	6	0	1933	1937	
Willy Larsson	DF	6	0	1939	1939	
Jørgen Hammeken	MF	6	0	1946	1947	
Erik Nielsen	FW	6	1	1953	1955	
Bent Sørensen	FW	6	3	1953	1957	
Mogens Machon	FW	6	2	1957	1958	
Benny Lohse	MF	6	0	1958	1962	
Helge Jørgensen	FW	6	2	1962	1962	
Ole Fritsen	FW	6	3	1964	1973	
Max Møller	GK	6	0	1964	1965	
Bent Wolmar	DF	6	0	1964	1964	
Erik Dyreborg	FW	6	8	1967	1967	
Flemming Kjærsgaard	FW	6	0	1968	1970	
Niels-Henrik Yde	DF	6	0	1968	1968	
Bent Outzen	MF	6	1	1970	1971	
Jens Kolding	FW	6	0	1973	1981	
Ole Skouboe	FW	6	0	1973	1980	
Torsten Andersen	FW	6	1	1977	1979	
Per Steffensen	MF	6	0	1987	1988	
Brian Jensen	DF	6	0	1991	1994	
Per Pedersen	FW	6	2	1991	1997	
Søren Frederiksen	FW	6	1	1994	1999	
Erik Bo Andersen	FW	6	0	1995	1996	
Ole Tobiasen	DF	6	1	1997	1998	
Morten Skoubo	FW	6	1	2003	2011	
Martin Retov	MF	6	0	2004	2008	
Jonas Borring	MF	6	1	2008	2009	
Anders Møller Christensen	DF	6	0	2008	2017	
Patrick Mtiliga	DF	6	0	2008	2012	
Kasper Lorentzen	MF	6	1	2010	2012	
Simon Makienok	FW	6	0	2013	2013	
**Philip Billing**	MF	6	0	2020	2025	
**Matt O'Riley**	MF	6	0	2023	2025	
**Lucas Høgsberg**	DF	6	0	2025	2026	
Bernhard Andersen	FW	5	1	1918	1920	
Søren Andersen	FW	5	0	1951	1952	
Vagn Birkeland	FW	5	1	1954	1955	
Arne Toft	DF	5	1	1971	1974	
Jens Torstensen	FW	5	0	1951	1956	
Oskar Theisen	FW	5	3	1939	1943	
Chris Sørensen	DF	5	0	2007	2009	
Dennis Sørensen	FW	5	0	2006	2008	
Erling Sørensen	FW	5	2	1941	1948	
Knud Sørensen	FW	5	1	1953	1953	
Erik Sviatchenko	DF	5	1	2015	2016	
Kjeld Seneca	MF	5	0	1974	1976	
Iver Schriver	FW	5	6	1971	1971	
Svend Ringsted	DF	5	0	1918	1921	
Poul Rasmussen	FW	5	3	1949	1952	
Max Rasmussen	MF	5	0	1972	1972	
Kaj Poulsen	FW	5	1	1965	1966	
Svend Petersen	FW	5	2	1926	1932	
John Petersen	MF	5	0	1964	1966	
Flemming Nielsen	DF	5	0	1978	1979	
René Møller	FW	5	1	1966	1967	
Vilhelm Munk Nielsen	FW	5	0	1981	1983	
Anders Lindegaard	GK	5	0	2010	2011	
Ulrik Laursen	DF	5	1	2007	2008	
Emil Larsen	FW	5	0	2012	2014	
Bent Krog	MF	5	0	1961	1961	
Victor Klein	MF	5	3	1915	1917	
Knud Kastrup	FW	5	0	1923	1927	
Michael Jakobsen	DF	5	0	2009	2009	
Ole Højgaard	DF	5	0	1979	1979	
Jan Højland	MF	5	0	1974	1978	
Jørgen Iversen	FW	5	1	1937	1940	
Jørgen Henriksen	GK	5	0	1967	1972	
Mogens Hansen	FW	5	1	1976	1984	
Harry Hansen	FW	5	2	1916	1922	
Niels Hagenau	GK	5	0	1971	1971	
Svend Aage Eriksen	FW	5	3	1928	1933	
Ole Forsing	FW	5	1	1970	1971	
Kai Frandsen	FW	5	1	1949	1950	
Torben Frank	FW	5	0	1991	1992	(gold) 1992 EC
Poul Graae	GK	5	0	1920	1925	
Claus Christiansen	DF	5	0	1991	1993	(gold) 1992 EC
Hans Jørgen Christiansen	DF	5	0	1968	1969	
Kaj Christiansen	FW	5	6	1943	1948	
**Anders Christiansen**	MF	5	0	2014	2021	
**Jens Jønsson**	MF	5	0	2020	2021	
**Oliver Provstgaard**	DF	5	0	2026	2026	
Egon Andersen		4	0	1936	1936	
Henrik Agerbeck		4	0	1978	1979	
Martin Albrechtsen		4	0	2001	2006	
Martin Bernburg		4	1	2008	2009	
Harald Bohr		4	2	1908	1910	1908 OG (silver)
Keld Bordinggaard		4	0	1983	1990	
Orla Brixler		4	0	1938	1943	
Helge Bronée		4	1	1945	1946	
Bent Christensen		4	0	1988	1989	
Ole Østergaard		4	0	1983	1983	
Ove Sørensen		4	0	1936	1938	
Peter Skov-Jensen		4	0	2002	2004	
Magnus Simonsen		4	0	1922	1927	
Svend Sanvig		4	0	1934	1936	
Thomas Rytter		4	0	1996	2003	
Frank Reckendorff		4	3	1949	1954	
Svend Remtoft		4	0	1923	1924	
Jørn Rasmussen		4	0	1970	1970	
Hjalte Nørregaard		4	0	2008	2009	
Svend Olsen		4	0	1930	1932	
Knud Pedersen		4	0	1965	1965	
Ernst Nielsen		4	0	1934	1937	
Frank Nielsen		4	0	1975	1976	
Carsten Nielsen		4	0	1975	1979	
Birger Mauritzen		4	1	1975	1976	
Eli Larsen		4	0	1933	1934	
Søren Larsen		4	0	1973	1975	
Haldur Lasthein		4	0	1925	1931	
August Lindgren		4	3	1908	1910	1908 OG (silver)
Karsten Lund		4	2	1968	1968	
Peter Kjær		4	0	2001	2002	
Frank Klausen		4	0	1983	1983	
John Kramer		4	2	1959	1959	
Jesper Kristensen		4	0	1994	1995	
Leon Jessen		4	0	2009	2010	
Jack Johnson		4	0	1951	1954	
Emil Jørgensen		4	1	1911	1912	1912 OG (silver)
Gert Jørgensen		4	2	1977	1978	
Lars Jakobsen		4	1	1990	1990	
Bjarne Jensen		4	0	1988	1989	
Erik Jensen		4	0	1955	1957	
Erik Kuld Jensen		4	1	1947	1950	
John Jensen		4	1	1957	1958	
Kristian Middelboe		4	0	1908	1910	1908 OG (silver)
Finn Alfred Hansen		4	1	1957	1958	
Leif Hansen		4	0	1983	1983	
Steen Hansen		4	0	1981	1984	
Per Funch Jensen		4	0	1959	1959	
Kurt Grønning		4	0	1963	1964	
Alfred Hansen		4	0	1937	1940	
Povl Frederiksen		4	0	1970	1971	
Svend Erik Christensen		4	1	1975	1977	
Hans Colberg		4	0	1948	1950	
Georg Dahlfelt		4	0	1950	1950	
Ludvig Drescher		4	0	1908	1910	1908 OG (silver); 1912 OG (silver)
Henning Elting		4	0	1949	1950	
**Filip Jørgensen**	GK	4	0	2025	2026	
**Mads Hermansen**	GK	4	0	2026	2026	
**Adam Daghim**	FW	4	0	2026	2026	
Svend Albrechtsen		3	2	1938	1939	
Hans Aabech		3	0	1973	1974	
Knud Andersen		3	2	1937	1937	
Poul Andersen		3	0	1979	1980	
Uffe Bech		3	0	2014	2014	
Ib Bengtsson		3	0	1949	1950	
Nicki Bille		3	1	2013	2013	
Ole Bjur		3	1	1996	1997	
Børge Christensen		3	0	1954	1956	
Kim Christensen		3	0	2010	2010	
Michael Christensen		3	0	1983	1983	
Mikkel Thygesen		3	0	2006	2008	
Poul-Erik Thygesen		3	0	1970	1970	
Kim Ziegler		3	0	1982	1982	
Knud Herbert Sørensen		3	0	1976	1977	
Johnny Thomsen		3	0	2010	2011	
Ulrich Thychosen		3	0	1980	1981	
Fridtjof Steen		3	0	1920	1924	
Ole Steffensen		3	0	1968	1969	
Bo Svensson		3	0	2006	2011	
Edmund Sørensen		3	0	1945	1945	
Søren Skov		3	0	1982	1982	
Michael Spangsborg		3	1	1983	1983	
Kris Stadsgaard		3	0	2009	2012	
Oluf Skjelmose		3	0	1934	1934	
Henrik Skouboe		3	0	1977	1979	
Thorvald Schultz		3	0	1923	1925	
Brian Rasmussen		3	0	1989	1990	
Søren Rieks		3	1	2009	2010	
Michael Schäfer		3	0	1980	1983	
Ernst Petersen		3	0	1916	1918	
Johnny Petersen		3	0	1970	1970	
Knud Nørregaard		3	0	1974	1975	
Agner Pedersen		3	0	1933	1934	
Henrik Pedersen		3	0	2000	2004	
Kaj Nielsen		3	0	1952	1953	
Kurt Nielsen		3	3	1952	1953	
Emil Møller		3	0	1932	1933	
Aksel Nielsen		3	0	1938	1938	
Erling Nielsen		3	0	1958	1964	
Lars Lunde		3	0	1983	1987	
Carl Lundsteen		3	3	1934	1934	
Per Madsen		3	0	1969	1970	
Peder Kjær		3	1	1957	1957	
Villy Kragh		3	0	1959	1962	
Claus Larsen		3	0	1975	1975	
Orla Laugesen		3	0	1935	1938	
Peter Johansson		3	1	1972	1972	
John Jørgensen		3	0	1955	1955	
Arne Karlsen		3	0	1959	1960	
Henning Jensen		3	0	1931	1932	
Heinz Hildebrandt		3	0	1970	1972	
Carl Holm		3	0	1949	1952	
Eiler Holm		3	0	1923	1928	
Sigurd Iversen		3	0	1947	1947	
Jørgen Jacobsen		3	1	1954	1955	
Johannes Hansen		3	0	1913	1917	
Kurt Hansen		3	0	1953	1954	
Svend Hansen		3	0	1928	1928	
Henning Helbrandt		3	0	1961	1961	
Kristian Gyldenstein		3	3	1911	1913	
Allan Hansen		3	0	1975	1978	
Egon Hansen		3	1	1965	1965	
Torben Christensen		3	0	1984	1985	
Bruno Eliasen		3	0	1958	1963	
Erik Glümer		3	0	1938	1940	
**Elias Jelert**	DF	3	0	2023	2024	
**Gustav Isaksen**	FW	3	1	2026	2026	
Christian Andersen		2	0	1969	1969	
Jakob Ahlmann		2	0	2014	2014	
Johan Absalonsen		2	1	2009	2009	
Henrik Andersen		2	0	1915	1916	
Kaj Andersen		2	0	1963	1963	
Knud Andersen		2	0	1924	1924	
Niels Erik Andersen		2	0	1966	1966	
Jesper Bech		2	0	2006	2009	
Thomas Augustinussen		2	0	2008	2009	
Søren Berg		2	0	2003	2006	
Henrik Bernburg		2	0	1968	1970	
Ødbert Bjarnholt		2	0	1911	1914	1908 OG (silver)
Olaf Brockhoff		2	0	1935	1936	
Palle Bruun		2	1	1963	1963	
**Andreas Maxsø**	DF	2	0	2020	2022	
**Jens Stage**	MF	2	0	2021	2024	
**Morten Frendrup**	MF	2	0	2024	2025	
**William Osula**	FW	2	0	2026	2026	
**Nikolas Nartey**	MF	2	0	2026	2026	
Hans Andersen		1	0	1963	1963	
Peter Andersen		1	0	1908	1908	
Hans Henrik Andreasen		1	0	2010	2010	
Børge Bach		1	0	1973	1973	
Christian Bannis		1	0	2018	2018	
Per Bartram		1	0	1975	1975	
Mads Bertelsen		1	0	2018	2018	
Kurt Berthelsen		1	0	1972	1972	
Michael Birkedal		1	0	1982	1982	
Henning Bjerregaard		1	0	1954	1954	
Leslie Bolton		1	0	1938	1938	
Christian Bommelund Christensen		1	0	2018	2018	
Carsten Brandenborg		1	0	1972	1972	
Per Brandtmar		1	0	1941	1941	
Otto Bresling		1	0	1940	1940	
Kim Brodersen		1	0	1993	1993	
August Bøge		1	1	1926	1926	
Curt Christensen		1	0	1949	1949	
Hans Christensen		1	0	1934	1934	
Jørgen Christensen		1	0	1970	1970	
Reinholdt Christensen		1	1	1938	1938	
Tommy Christensen		1	0	1983	1983	
Poul Christiansen		1	0	1925	1925	
Hjalmar Christoffersen		1	0	1912	1912	1912 OG (silver)
Kevin Conboy		1	0	2012	2012	
Carsten Dethlefsen		1	0	1994	1994	
Heine Fernandez		1	0	1991	1991	
Adam Fogt		1	0	2018	2018	
**Jonas Lössl**	GK	1	0	2016	2016	
**Oliver Abildgaard**	MF	1	0	2020	2020	
**Oliver Christensen**	GK	1	0	2020	2020	
**Kristian Pedersen**	DF	1	0	2020	2020	
**Marcus Ingvartsen**	FW	1	0	2021	2021	
**Mikael Uhre**	FW	1	0	2021	2021	
**Nicolai Vallys**	MF	1	0	2023	2023	
**Mads Roerslev**	DF	1	0	2024	2024	
**Conrad Harder**	FW	1	0	2025	2025	
**Mathias Kvistgaarden**	FW	1	0	2025	2025	
**Carlo Holse**	FW	1	0	2025	2025	
**Anton Gaaei**	DF	1	0	2025	2025	
**Thomas Jørgensen**	GK	1	0	2026	2026	
**Mads Bidstrup**	MF	1	0	2026	2026	
Carl Emil Christiansen		2	1	1962	1962	
Steen Danielsen		2	0	1974	1974	
Bent Dideriksen		2	0	1957	1957	
Theill Drengsgaard		2	0	1956	1957	
Hans Erfurt		2	0	1989	1989	
Erik Eriksen		2	0	1929	1929	
**Rasmus Falk**	MF	2	0	2013	2020	
Henning Frandsen		1	0	1949	1949	
John Frandsen		1	0	1973	1973	
Thomas Frandsen		1	0	2002	2002	
Svend Frederiksen		2	0	1941	1941	
Carsten Fredgaard		1	0	1999	1999	
Anders Fønss		1	0	2018	2018	
Thomas Gaardsøe		2	1	2003	2004	
Johannes Gandil		1	0	1908	1908	1908 OG (silver)
Rasmus Gaudin		1	0	2018	2018	
Ralf Ginsborg		2	0	1952	1952	
Bjarke Gundlev		1	0	1957	1957	
Christoffer Haagh		1	0	2018	2018	
Mogens Haastrup		2	0	1970	1970	
Heini Hald		2	0	1965	1965	
Alan Hansen		2	0	1983	1983	
Axel Hansen		2	0	1927	1935	
Bent Hansen		1	0	1971	1971	
Bo Hansen		1	0	1995	1995	
Ejner Hansen		1	0	1931	1931	
Esben Hansen		1	0	2007	2007	
Gert Hansen		2	0	1961	1961	
Hans Hansen		2	0	1920	1920	
Johnny Hansen		2	0	1989	1989	
Kian Hansen		2	0	2014	2015	
Niels Hansen		2	0	1928	1928	
Palle Hansen		1	0	1979	1979	
Raymond Hansen		1	0	1935	1935	
Svend Hansen		1	0	1931	1931	
Svend Hansen		2	1	1942	1949	
Tommy Hansen		2	0	1973	1975	
Torben Hansen		1	0	1973	1973	
Valdemar Hansen		2	0	1972	1973	
Vagn Hedeager		1	0	1967	1967	
Werner Hedegaard		1	0	1934	1934	
Nicklas Helenius		2	0	2012	2012	
Carsten Hemmingsen		1	0	1995	1995	
Peter Hertz		1	0	1980	1980	
Svend Holm		1	0	1919	1919	
Daniel Holm		1	0	2018	2018	
Svend Hugger		2	0	1950	1950	
Anders Hunsballe		1	0	2018	2018	
Børge Hylle		2	0	1951	1951	
Oskar Højbye		1	0	2018	2018	
Lars Højer Nielsen		1	0	1993	1993	
Steffen Højer		1	0	1996	1996	
Johnny Jacobsen		1	0	1980	1980	
Christopher Jakobsen		1	0	2018	2018	
Jørn Jegsen		2	0	1943	1945	
Ejner Jensen		1	0	1955	1955	
Erhardt Jensen		1	0	1918	1918	
Frede Jensen		1	0	1945	1945	
Henning Gronemann		1	0	1954	1954	
Henrik Jensen		1	0	1982	1982	
Jens Jensen		1	0	1920	1920	
Karsten Jensen		2	0	1973	1973	
Nils Jensen		1	0	1961	1961	
Per Jensen		2	2	1952	1952	
Preben Jensen		2	0	1962	1962	
Robert Jensen		1	0	1925	1925	
Allan Jepsen		2	0	2005	2006	
Claus Johansen		1	0	1972	1972	
Martin Johansen		1	0	1993	1993	
Michael Johansen		2	0	2000	2002	
Nicolai Johansen		1	0	2018	2018	
Rasmus Johansson		1	0	2018	2018	
Jesper Juelsgård		2	0	2012	2014	
Jørgen Juul Jensen		1	0	1990	1990	
Bendt Jørgensen		2	0	1950	1951	
Helge Jørgensen		2	0	1937	1938	
Kurt Jørgensen		2	0	1988	1988	
Mads Jørgensen		1	0	2001	2001	
Bashkim Kadrii		1	0	2011	2011	
Palle Kähler		2	0	1964	1964	
Jonas Kamper		1	0	2006	2006	
Brian Kaus		1	0	1993	1993	
Kasper Kempel		1	0	2018	2018	
Valdemar Kendzior		2	3	1954	1954	
Arne Kleven		2	0	1927	1931	
Egon Knudsen		2	0	1938	1940	
Per Knudsen		2	0	1948	1952	
Jens-Carl Kristensen		1	0	1955	1955	
Martin Kristensen		1	0	1952	1952	
Tommy Kristiansen		2	0	1977	1979	
Carl Larsen		1	0	1937	1937	
Michael Larsen		2	0	1993	1993	
Thomas Larsen		2	0	1980	1980	
Jan Lauridsen		1	0	1988	1988	
Rajko Lekić		1	0	2010	2010	
Michael Lumb		2	0	2009	2010	
Jens Lundgaard		1	0	1937	1937	
Ivar Lykke		2	0	1975	1975	1912 OG (silver)
Søren Lyng		2	0	1990	1991	
Bent Løfqvist		1	0	1961	1961	
Frank Løndal		1	0	1984	1984	
Aksel Madsen		1	0	1949	1949	
Kay Madsen		1	0	1928	1928	
Poul Mathiasen		1	0	1975	1975	
Poul Mejer		2	0	1961	1962	
Peter Nymann Mikkelsen		1	0	2010	2010	
Eigil Misser		2	0	1963	1963	
Finn Mittet		2	0	1955	1955	
Otto Moltke		1	0	1919	1919	
Christian Morville		1	0	1912	1912	1912 OG (silver)
Kristian Mosegaard		2	0	1957	1957	
Hartvig Møller		1	0	1949	1949	
Richard Møller Nielsen		2	0	1959	1961	
Svend Møllnitz		1	0	1927	1927	
Adolph Mølsgaard		1	0	1937	1937	
Alex Nielsen		1	0	1983	1983	
Allan Nielsen		2	0	1984	1984	
Arno Nielsen		2	1	1939	1939	
Arthur Nielsen		1	0	1935	1935	
Benny Nielsen		1	0	1978	1978	
Daniel Nielsen		1	0	2018	2018	
Erik Nielsen		1	0	1962	1962	
Hugo Nielsen		2	0	1935	1935	
John Nielsen		2	0	1938	1938	
Jørgen Nielsen		1	0	1953	1953	
Kai Nielsen		1	0	1934	1934	
Lasse Nielsen		1	0	2012	2012	
Leo Nielsen		1	0	1946	1946	
Michael Mio Nielsen		1	0	1993	1993	
Poul Nielsen		1	0	1948	1948	
Poul Nielsen		1	0	1920	1920	
Wilhelm Nielsen		1	0	1925	1925	
Christian Offenberg		1	0	2018	2018	
Arnold Olsen		1	0	1950	1950	
Danny Olsen		1	0	2014	2014	
Holger Olsen		1	0	1949	1949	
Otto Palby		2	0	1916	1919	
Gustaf Pålsson		2	1	1945	1947	
Bent Pedersen		2	0	1956	1956	
Carsten Pedersen		1	0	1987	1987	
Axel Petersen		1	0	1946	1946	
Axel Petersen		2	0	1911	1912	1912 OG (silver)
Claes Petersen		1	1	1949	1949	
Erik Rasmus Petersen		1	0	1955	1955	
Kjeld Petersen		2	0	1963	1963	
Knud Petersen		1	0	1957	1957	
Leif Petersen		1	0	1951	1951	
Leif Petersen		1	0	1956	1956	
Jan Pettersson		1	0	1974	1974	
John Pettersson		2	0	1949	1954	
Christopher Poulsen		2	0	2008	2008	
John Povelsen		1	0	1977	1977	
Axel Preno		2	0	1922	1923	
Leif Raaby		1	0	1974	1974	
Anders Randrup		1	0	2008	2008	
Svend Aage Rask		1	0	1969	1969	
Bjørn Rasmussen		2	0	1908	1908	1908 OG (silver)
Egon Rasmussen		2	2	1961	1961	
Erik Rasmussen		2	0	1990	1991	
Jørgen Rasmussen		1	1	1964	1964	
Ole Rasmussen		2	0	1984	1985	
Peder Rasmussen		1	1	1937	1937	
Richard Rasmussen		1	0	1913	1913	
Arne Rastad		2	0	1973	1973	
Hans Rützebeck		1	0	1915	1915	
Martin Ryding		1	0	1923	1923	
James Rønvang		2	0	1950	1951	
Kim Sander		2	0	1980	1980	
Helge Scharff		1	0	1917	1917	
Johannes Schmidt		1	0	1955	1955	
Asbjørn Sennels		2	0	2003	2004	
Brian Skaarup		1	0	1990	1990	
Karl Aage Skouborg		1	0	1974	1974	
John Stampe		1	0	1985	1985	
Ronald Stelmer		1	0	1978	1978	
Kurt Stendal		1	1	1973	1973	
Finn Sterobo		2	0	1962	1962	
Jacob Svinggaard		1	0	1990	1990	
Anders Sørensen		1	0	1974	1974	
Erik Sørensen		1	0	1939	1939	
Erik Sørensen		2	0	1974	1974	
Erling Sørensen		1	0	1959	1959	
Frederik Sørensen		1	0	2017	2017	
Knud Sørensen		2	1	1935	1938	
Knud Herbert Sørensen		2	0	1958	1958	
Ove Sørensen		1	0	1966	1966	
Per Friis Sørensen		1	0	1970	1970	
Poul Sørensen		1	0	1932	1932	
Tage Sørensen		1	0	1945	1945	
Holger Teilmann		1	0	1915	1915	
Nicolaj Thomsen		1	0	2014	2014	
Børge Thorup		1	0	1965	1965	
Axel Thufason		2	0	1911	1912	1912 OG (silver)
Steen Thychosen		2	0	1984	1986	
Ib Thygesen		1	0	1955	1955	
Finn Trikker		1	0	1979	1979	
Karl Vilhelmsen		1	1	1923	1923	
Simon Vollesen		1	0	2018	2018	
Kaj Wagener		1	0	1972	1972	
Per Wind		2	0	1977	1977	
Poul Erik Østergaard		1	0	1979	1979	

== See also ==
- List of Denmark international footballers, players with 25 caps or more
