= Børge =

Børge is a male Norwegian and Danish given name, a younger variant of Birger. The Swedish spelling is Börje. Notable people with the name include:

- Børge Andersen (chess player) (1934–1993), Danish chess player
- Børge Kaas Andersen (1937–2019), Danish rower
- Børge Bach (1945–2016), Danish footballer
- Børge Bæth (1920–1981), Danish swimmer
- Børge Bak (1912–1990), Danish inventor, violinist, chemist and professor
- Børge Børresen (1919–2007), Danish Dragon class sailor
- Børge Brende (born 1965), Norwegian politician and diplomat
- Børge Christensen (footballer) (1931–2014), Danish footballer
- Børge Christensen (sport shooter) (1912–1967), Danish sports shooter
- Børge Enemark (1943–1996), Danish footballer
- Børge Frederiksen (born 1920), Danish badminton player
- Børge Fristrup (1918–1985), Danish geographer
- Børge Gissel (1915–2002), Danish cyclist
- Børge Møller Grimstrup (1906–1972), Danish actor
- Børge Hansen (1931–2018), Danish rower
- Børge Havn (1902–1958), Danish footballer
- Børge Hernes (born 1976), Norwegian footballer
- Børge Holm (1910–1971), Dutch boxer
- Børge Hougaard (1921–2012), Danish rower
- Børge Hylle (1926–1990), Danish footballer
- Børge Jensen (1911–1967), Danish wrestler
- Børge Jessen (1907–1993), Danish mathematician
- Børge Josefsen (born 1953), Norwegian footballer
- Børge Krogh (1942–2022), Danish boxer
- Børge Larsen (1911–1979), Danish middle-distance runner
- Børge Bastholm Larsen (1931–1960), Danish footballer
- Børge Johannes Lauritsen (1916–1944), Danish resistance member
- Børge Lund (born 1979), Norwegian handball player
- Børge Mathiesen (1918–1962), Danish footballer
- Børge Minerth (1920–1980), Danish gymnast
- Børge Mogensen (1914–1972), Danish furniture designer
- Børge Monberg (1905–1990), Danish field hockey player
- Børge Mørk (born 1971), Norwegian swimmer
- Børge Mortensen (1921–2005), Danish cyclist
- Børge Müller (1909–1963), Danish screenwriter
- Børge Nielsen (gymnast) (1924–2017), Danish gymnast
- Børge Raahauge Nielsen (1920–2010), Danish rower
- Børge Saxil Nielsen (1920–1977), Danish cyclist
- Børge Nyrop (1881–1948), Danish painter
- Børge Obel (born 1948), Danish organizational theorist
- Børge Olsen-Hagen (1883–1936), Norwegian journalist, newspaper editor and politician
- Børge Ousland (born 1962), Norwegian polar explorer, photographer and writer
- Børge Willy Redsted Pedersen, the birthname of Sven Hassel (1917–2012), Danish writer
- Børge Petersen-Øverleir (born 1967), Musical artist
- Børge Rannestad (born 1973), Norwegian footballer
- Børge Ring (1921–2018), Danish animator
- Børge Rosenbaum, the birthname of Victor Borge (1909–2000), Danish-American comedian and pianist
- Børge Johan Schultz (1764–1826)
- Børge Thorup (born 1943), Danish footballer

== See also ==
- Borg (disambiguation)
- Borge (disambiguation)
- Borger (disambiguation)
