= Hans Hansson =

Hans Hansson may refer to:

== Sportspeople ==
- Hans Hansson (ice hockey) (born 1949), Swedish ice hockey player
- Hans Hansson (skier) (1919–2003), Swedish alpine skier
- Hans Hansson (wrestler) (1901–1971), Swedish wrestler
- Hans Hansson (tennis), Australian tennis player

== Others ==
- Hans Hansson i Stocksäter (1893–1978), Swedish politician
- Hans Kristian Hansson (1895–1959), Norwegian jurist and civil servant
- Thors Hans Hansson (born 1950), Swedish physicist

== See also ==
- Hans Hanson (disambiguation)
- Hans Hansen (disambiguation)
- Hanson (surname)
