= Hedegaard =

Hedegaard is a surname. Notable people with the surname include:

- Hedegaard (DJ), full name Rasmus Hedegaard, Danish DJ and record producer.
- Connie Hedegaard (born 1960), Danish politician
- Harry Hedegaard (1894–1939), Danish swimmer
- Holger Hedegaard (fl. 2006), final mayor of Vinderup Municipality in Denmark
- Kirsten Hedegaard Jensen (born 1935), Danish swimmer
- Lars Hedegaard (born 1942), Danish historian, journalist and author
- Lars Hedegaard Andersen (born 1975), Danish cricketer
- Martin Hoberg Hedegaard (born 1992), Danish singer, also known by his mononym Martin
- Mikkel Hedegaard, Danish footballer
- Morten Hedegaard (born 1972), Danish cricketer
- Werner Hedegaard (1911–1975), Danish footballer

== See also ==
- DAVA Foods, formerly known as Hedegaard Foods
