= Dideriksen =

Dideriksen is a surname. Notable people with the surname include:

- Amalie Dideriksen (born 1996), Danish cyclist
- Bent Dideriksen (born 1931), Danish footballer
- Katrina Rose Dideriksen (born 1983), American stage actress

== See also ==
- Didriksen
- Paul Diderichsen (1905–1964), Danish linguist
