= Thorst =

Surname list

Thorst is a surname. Notable people with the surname include:

- Kjeld Thorst (born 1940), Danish footballer and manager
- Søren Thorst (born 1965), Danish footballer, son of Kjeld

== See also ==
- Horst (given name)
- Thorsten
