= Alfred Hansen =

Alfred Hansen may refer to:

- Alfred G. Hansen (born 1933), United States Air Force general
- Alfred Hansen (cinematographer) (1885–1935), German cinematographer
- Alfred Hansen (footballer) (1913–1995), Danish footballer
