= Hans Hansen =

Hans Hansen may refer to:

== Painters ==
- Hans Hansen (Faroese painter) (1920–1970)
- Hans Hansen (Danish painter) (1769–1828)

== Politicians ==
- Hans Christian Albert Hansen (1847–1925), Norwegian politician for the Conservative Party
- H. C. Hansen (1906–1960), social democrat and Prime Minister of Denmark
- Hans Nicolai Hansen (1835–1910), Danish politician, lawyer and speaker of the Landsting
- Hans Ove Hansen (1904–1994), politician in Saskatchewan, Canada

== Architects ==
- Hans Christian Hansen (architect) (1803–1883), Danish architect mainly active in Athens and Copenhagen
- Hans Hansen (architect) (1889–1966), German architect, member of the Glass Chain correspondence

== Sportspeople ==
- Hans Hansen (rower) (1915–2006), Norwegian competition rower and Olympic medalist
- Hans Jørgen Hansen (1879–1966), Danish field hockey player
- Hans Fróði Hansen (born 1975), football player from the Faroe Islands
- Hans Trier Hansen (1893–1980), Danish Olympic gymnast
- Hans Ewald Hansen (1944–2026), Danish footballer
- Hans Hansen (footballer)

== Others ==
- Hans Hansen (composer) (1817–1878), Danish composer
- Hans A. Hansen (1872–1915), U.S. Navy sailor and Medal of Honor recipient
- Hans Jacob Hansen (1855–1936), Danish zoologist
- Hans Morten Hansen (born 1964), Norwegian stand-up comedian
- Hans Peter Hansen (1829–1899), Danish xylographer
- Hans Andrew Hansen (1968– ), American horticulturist/plant breeder

== See also ==
- Hans Hansen Bergen (c. 1610–1654), settler of the Dutch colony of New Amsterdam
- Hans Hanson (disambiguation)
- Hans Hansson (disambiguation)
