= Niels Andersen =

Niels Andersen may refer to:

- Niels Andersen (sport shooter) (1867–1930), Danish sport shooter
- Niels Andersen (actor) (born 1942), Danish actor
- Niels Erik Andersen (born 1945), Danish football player
- Niels Andersen (businessman) (1835–1911), Danish businessman and politician
- Niels Siggaard Andersen, Danish and later Norwegian curler
