= Aksel Madsen =

- Aksel Madsen (athlete)
- Aksel Madsen (footballer)
