= Borger =

Borger may refer to:

- Borger (name), a surname and given name
- Borger, Netherlands
- Borger, Texas, U.S.

== See also ==
- Boorger
- Börger
- Borge (disambiguation)
- Børge
- Burger (disambiguation)
