= Raymond Hanson =

Raymond Hanson or Hansen may refer to:

- Raymond Alvah Hanson (1923–2009), American entrepreneur, inventor and engineer
- Raymond Hanson (composer) (1913–1976), Australian composer and lecturer
- Raymond Hanson (cricketer) (born 1951), English cricketer
- Ray Hanson (1895–1982), American football coach
- Raymond Hansen (footballer), Danish footballer
