= Poul Andersen =

Poul Andersen may refer to:

- Poul Andersen (resistance member) (1922–2006), printer, publisher and Danish resistance member
- Poul Andersen (footballer, born 1928) (1928–2010), Danish footballer
- Poul Andersen (footballer, born 1930) (1930–1995), Danish footballer
- Poul Andersen (footballer, born 1953), Danish footballer

== See also ==
- Poul Anderson (1926–2001), American science fiction author
- Paul Anderson (disambiguation)
