= Helge Jørgensen =

- Helge Jørgensen (footballer, born 1912)
- Helge Jørgensen (footballer, born 1937)
