= Kjeld Thorst =

Danish football player and manager (1940–2026)

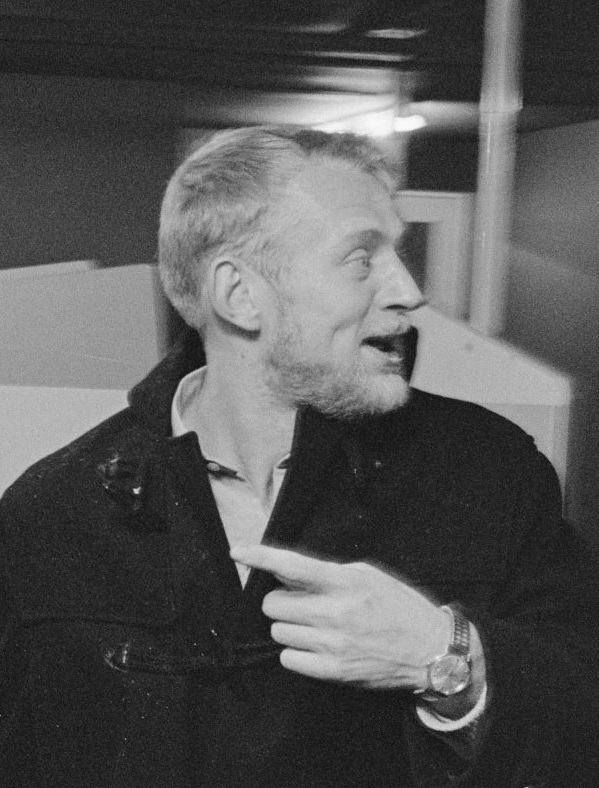
- Thorst in 1966

Personal information
- Date of birth: 13 May 1940
- Place of birth: Øster Svenstrup, Denmark
- Date of death: 3 November 2026 (aged 86)
- Place of death: Sulsted, Denmark
- Position: Forward

Youth career
- Skovsgaard Boldklub

Senior career*
Years	Team	Apps	(Gls)
1957–1960	Ranum IF		
1961–1971	AaB	265	(78)

International career
1961–1962	Denmark U21	8	(3)
1963–1969	Denmark	26	(6)

Managerial career
- 197?–197?: Sulsted IF
- 1975–1976: AaB
- * Club domestic league appearances and goals

Kjeld Thorst (13 May 1940 – 3 November 2026) was a Danish football player and coach who played as a forward. After beginning his senior career with Ranum IF, he spent most of his playing career with AaB, where he became one of the club's leading forwards, scoring a club-record 78 league goals and helping the side win the 1965–66 Danish Cup. He was capped 26 times by the Denmark national team between 1963 and 1969, scoring six goals, and represented Denmark at the 1964 European Nations' Cup. After retiring as a player, he later coached AaB from 1976 to 1977.

== Club career ==
Thorst began playing football with Skovsgaard Boldklub, where he spent his youth career, before starting his senior career with Ranum IF in Series 1 at the age of 16. In 1961, he joined AaB after being recommended by fellow student and future club-mate Heini Hald at Ranum Seminarium.

He made his AaB debut on 30 April 1961 in the Danish 2nd Division, scoring a hat-trick in a 4–3 win over Odense KFUM. He soon established himself as one of the club's leading players and served for many years as team captain.

In 1964, Thorst scored the decisive goal as AaB secured promotion back to the Danish top flight. Two years later, he was part of the side that won the club's first Danish Cup title, defeating Kjøbenhavns Boldklub 3–1 after extra time in the 1966 final. He also captained AaB to a third-place league finish in 1969.

Thorst initially retired in 1969 at the age of 29, though he later made a brief comeback in 1971. Across his career with AaB, he made 265 appearances and scored 88 goals in all competitions; his 78 league goals remained a club record.

== International career ==
Thorst made his debut for the Denmark national team on 15 September 1963 in an away match against Norway at Ullevaal, scoring on his debut. He was the first AaB player to represent Denmark since Egon Johansen.

He made an immediate impact at international level, scoring five goals in his first seven appearances. One of his most notable performances came in a 3–2 win over Romania on 3 November 1963, when he scored after only 20 seconds and added a second goal later in the match. He also scored for Denmark against Sweden and Israel.

Thorst was part of the Denmark side that reached the final tournament of the 1964 European Nations' Cup. During his international career, he won 26 caps and scored six goals, and captained Denmark on one occasion.

== Coaching career ==
After his playing career, Thorst coached Sulsted IF before returning to AaB as first-team coach in 1976. He remained in the role until 1977 and subsequently served in a leadership role at the club.

== Personal life ==
Thorst was the father of former AaB defender Søren Thorst. After his football career, he worked as a teacher at Sulsted Skole. For his contribution to AaB, he was later chosen by the club's official supporters' club as Århundredets AaB'er ("AaB'er of the Century").

=== Death ===
On 3 November 2026, AaB announced that Thorst had died earlier that day. He was 86.

== Honours ==
AaB

- Danish Cup: 1965–66
