= Børge Christensen =

Børge Christensen may refer to:

- Børge Christensen (footballer) (1931–2014), Danish footballer
- Børge Christensen (sport shooter) (1912–1967), Danish sport shooter
