= Bilde =

Bilde is a surname. Notable people with the surname include:

- Bruno Bilde (born 1976), French politician
- Dennis Bilde (born 1989), Danish bridge player
- Dominique Bilde (born 1953), French politician
- Gilles De Bilde (born 1971), Belgian footballer
- Poul Bilde (1938–2021), Danish footballer
