= Egon Johansen (footballer) =

Danish footballer (1917–2003)

Personal information
- Full name: Jens Christian Egon Johansen
- Date of birth: 25 December 1917
- Place of birth: Skalborg, Denmark
- Date of death: 8 July 2003 (aged 85)
- Position: Centre-half

Youth career
- 1928–1936: AaB

Senior career*
Years	Team	Apps	(Gls)
1936–1953	AaB	252	(0)

International career
1940–1947	Denmark	10	(0)
- * Club domestic league appearances and goals

Jens Christian Egon Johansen (25 December 1917 – 8 July 2003) was a Danish footballer who spent his entire senior career with AaB as a defender, primarily as a centre-half. A first-team player from 1936 to 1951, he was one of the leading figures in AaB's side of the 1940s and helped the club secure a place in the new Danish 1st Division in 1945. He was capped 10 times by the Denmark national football team between 1940 and 1947. After retiring as a player, he remained closely involved with AaB for decades as a youth coach, board member and club official, and also served on the Danish Football Association's selection committee.

== Early life ==
Johansen was born on 25 December 1917 in Skalborg, south of Aalborg, the youngest of three children. His father worked for the Danish State Railways, first as a parcel master and later as a train inspector.

He joined AaB as a boy after impressing in a school tournament, entering the club at the age of 10. As a youth player, Johansen was selected for various Jutland representative teams and won several regional youth titles.

== Club career ==
Johansen made his first-team debut for AaB on 21 May 1936 at the age of 18. He established himself as the club's regular centre-half the following year, after the departure of Svend Sanvig, and remained a first-team player until 1951. His career at AaB was interrupted only by the years of the German occupation of Denmark, during which he fled to Sweden after the arrest of the Danish police on 19 September 1944.

Alongside fellow Denmark international Orla Brixler, Johansen was regarded as one of the key players in helping AaB secure a place in the new Danish 1st Division in 1945. The club remained in the top flight for two seasons before dropping out, beginning a long period outside the highest division.

Johansen played his final league match for AaB on 26 August 1951, when the club lost 2–0 to local rivals Aalborg Chang in the opening match of the season. He was credited with 217 league appearances for AaB and no goals, while other sources gives him 254 appearances for the club in all competitions and describes that total as a club record at the time.

His playing career was effectively ended in 1953, when he contracted polio. Although he recovered relatively well, the illness left him with minor lasting problems in one arm and several fingers.

== International career ==
Johansen made his debut for the Denmark national team on 6 October 1940 in a 1–1 draw with Sweden at Råsunda. He later recalled being so nervous during the match that he asked teammate Børge Mathiesen afterwards what had happened in the opening 20 minutes.

From 1940 to 1947, he won 10 caps for Denmark. His international career was interrupted by World War II, and there was a break in his appearances between 1942 and his return in 1946. According to one source, seven of his internationals came against Sweden, and his only victory for Denmark was a 7–1 win over Norway in 1946.

Johansen also represented the Jutland FA selection, for whom he was credited with 27 appearances. He was reported to have been the first player to reach 25 matches for the representative side.

== War years and police service ==
Alongside his football career, Johansen worked as a police officer in Aalborg and later served for 40 years as a police assistant. Following the German action against the Danish police on 19 September 1944, he went into hiding and eventually escaped to Sweden by fishing boat from Sæby.

In Sweden, he was placed in a former military camp north of Malmö, where Danish police refugees underwent drills and weapons training. Near the end of the war, he was selected for a planned football match in Stockholm between Danish football refugees in Sweden and the Sweden national team, but the match was never played because of Germany's capitulation.

A few days after the end of the war, Johansen took part in a large freedom march with other returning policemen.

== Later involvement in football ==
After his playing career, Johansen remained closely involved with AaB as a youth coach, board member and member of the club's playing committee. He also continued to play oldboys football until his health forced him to stop.

From 1962 to 1972, he served on the Danish Football Association (DBU)'s selection committee. Another source states that he also later held a senior leadership role at AaB and served on a DBU playing committee.

Johansen remained associated with AaB for decades and was described as having been a club member for 75 years. He continued to attend the club's social events until shortly before his death.

== Personal life and death ==
Johansen lived most of his life in the Aalborg area. His son, Claus Johansen, was selected for a Denmark amateur trial match against England in 1972, shortly after Johansen had stepped down from the national selection committee.

He died on 8 July 2003 at the age of 85, and is buried at Almen Cemetery in Aalborg.
