= John Jorgensen =

John Jorgensen may refer to:

- John Jørgensen, Danish speedway rider
- John Jørgensen (footballer)
- Spider Jorgensen (1919–2003), American baseball player, born John Donald Jorgensen
- Johnny Jorgensen (1921–1973), American basketball player

== See also ==
- John Jorgenson (born 1956), American musician
