= Borge =

Borge may refer to:

== Places ==
=== Antarctica ===
- Borge Bay, small bay on the east side of Signy Island, in the South Orkney Islands
- Borge Point, headland forming the east side of Mikkelsen Harbor, Trinity Island, in the Palmer Archipelago

=== Norway ===
- Borge Municipality (Østfold), former municipality in Østfold county
- Borge Municipality (Nordland), former municipality in Nordland county
- Borge Church, parish church in Vestvågøy, Nordland county

=== Spain ===
- El Borge, town and municipality in the province of Málaga

== People ==
=== Surname ===
- Borge (surname)

=== Given name ===
- Børge, including a list of people so named

== See also ==
- Börger
- Borges (disambiguation)
- Borger (disambiguation)
- Borgue (disambiguation)
