= Søren Larsen (disambiguation) =

Søren Larsen is a Danish football player.

Søren Larsen may also refer to:

- Søren Larsen, Danish-built tall ship, now based in Australia
- Søren Absalon Larsen (1871–1957), Danish physicist, known for the "Larsen Effect"
- Soren Larsen (fictional ship)
- Søren Sebber Larsen (born 1966), Danish composer
- Søren Kusk (Søren Kusk Larsen, born 1960), Danish footballer and manager
- Søren Larsen (footballer, born 1949)
