= 1960 Danish football air crash =

1960 aviation accident

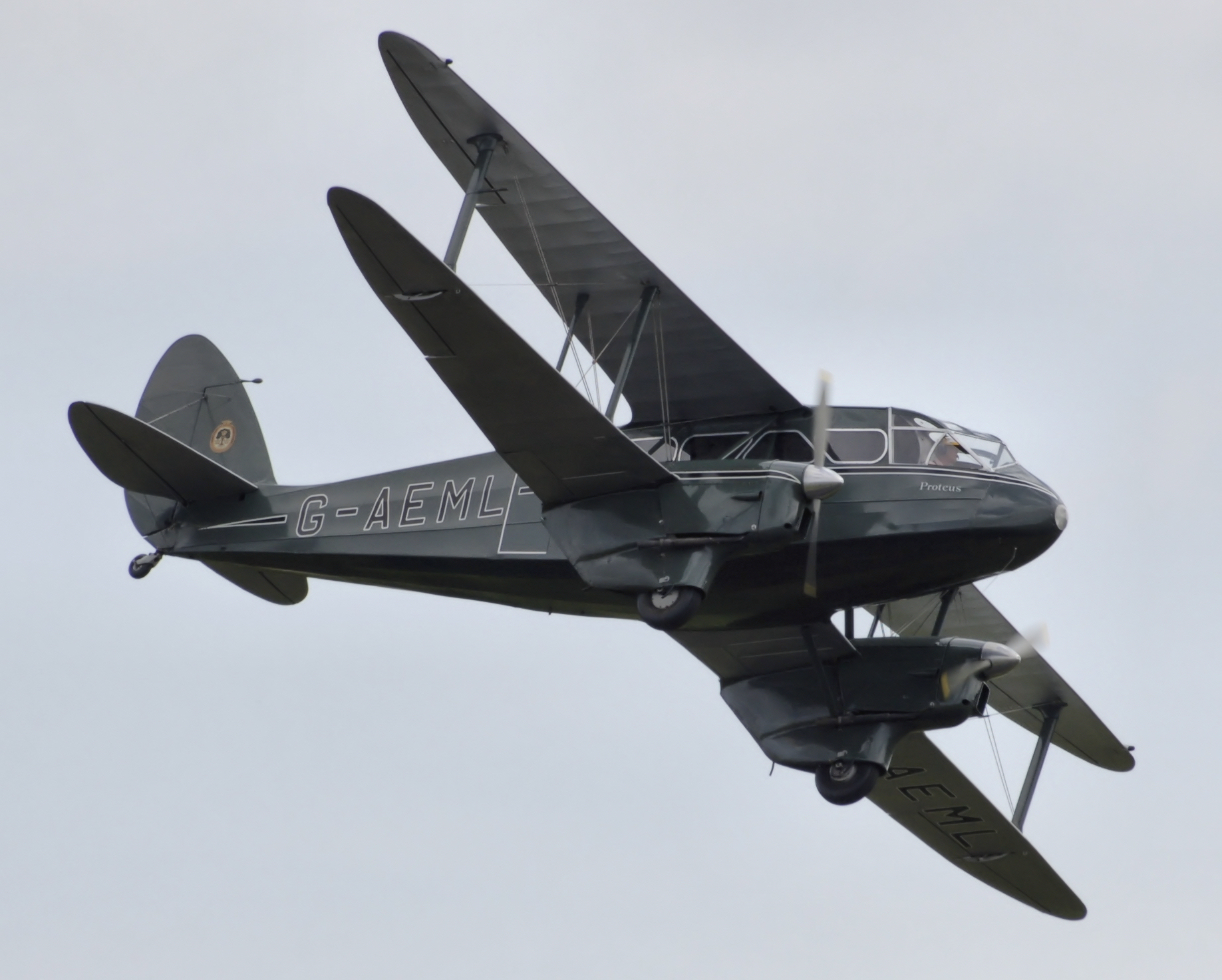
- A Dragon Rapide similar to the accident aircraft

Accident
- Date: 16 July 1960
- Summary: Loss of control in severe weather
- Site: Øresund

Aircraft
- Aircraft type: de Havilland Dragon Rapide
- Operator: Zonens Redningskorps
- Flight origin: Copenhagen Airport
- Destination: Herning Airport
- Passengers: 8
- Crew: 1
- Fatalities: 8
- Injuries: 1
- Survivors: 1

On 16 July 1960, after taking off from Copenhagen Airport at 15.38 local time, a de Havilland Dragon Rapide plane, (registration OY-DZY) chartered to the Danish Football Association, crashed into the Øresund about 50 metres (160 ft) from shore after the pilot lost control of the aircraft in severe weather. All eight passengers died; the pilot survived but required a leg to be amputated.

== Accident ==
Witnesses reported that shortly after taking off, one the plane's engines failed as the aircraft was only 300 feet (91 m) from the surface. The plane then went into a spin and crashed into the water about 150 feet (46 m) beyond the end of the runway. In the immediate aftermath, all sporting events throughout Denmark were cancelled. A scheduled exhibition football match by Manchester United in August was cancelled out of respect for the players' families.

== Footballers ==
The plane was carrying eight association football players to Herning Airport for a final trial match at Herning stadium to select the Danish squad for the 1960 Olympic tournament. Three of the eight had been provisionally selected for the squad; the rest were B-team and youth internationals with a last chance to impress the selectors.

The dead included:

Player	Age	Club	Caps	Position	Day-job	Notes
Per Funch Jensen	21	KB	4	Goalkeeper	Butcher	Selected for the Olympics.
Erik Pondal Jensen	29	AB	20	Half-back	Engineer	First reserve for the Olympics.
Søren Andersen	23	Frem	0	Striker	Warehouse worker	
Børge Bastholm Larsen	29	Køge	11	Full-back	Customs official	Selected for the Olympics.
Arne Karlsen	20	KB	3	Centre half	Blacksmith's apprentice	Selected for the Olympics.

Two fishermen found pilot Stig Vindeløv alive in the wreckage, along with Per Funch Jensen, who died en route to hospital.

== Second aircraft ==
A smaller plane waiting for clearance to take off when the accident occurred was due to carry four other players to the same match: Erik Dyreborg, Hans Christian Andersen, Bent Jørgensen, and Bjarne Eklund. These were all youth players. Dyreborg was reassigned from the first plane to make room for a kit basket.

== Olympics ==
After the accident, the Danish FA considered withdrawing from the Olympic tournament. In the event, they won the silver medal, losing to Yugoslavia in the final.

== See also ==
- List of accidents involving sports teams
