= Borger (name) =

Borger or Börger is a name, primarily used as a surname.

Notable people with the name include:

== Surname ==
- Andrew Borger, American drummer
- Asaf Borger, known as Borgore
- Bill Borger (born 1974), Canadian businessman
- David Borger (born 1969), Australian politician
- Egon Börger (born 1946), German computer scientist
- Elias Annes Borger (1784–1820), Dutch poet
- Gloria Borger (born 1952), American journalist
- Jamie Borger, (born 1964), Swedish drummer
- Jessica Borger, Australian immunologist and STEM advocate
- John Borger (Canadian football) (born 1935), former Canadian football player
- Julian Borger, British journalist
- Karla Borger, German beach volleyball player
- Nicolai Borger (born 1974), German writer
- Patrik Borger (born 1979), German football coach and former footballer
- Rykle Borger, German assyriologist
- Sebastian Borger, German journalist
- Wilhelm Börger (1896–1962), German politician

== Given name ==
- Borger Breeveld (born 1944), Surinamese actor and journalist
- Borger Kristoffersson Hoen (1799–1877), Norwegian farmer and politician
- Borger A. Lenth (born 1937), Norwegian civil servant, banker and lawyer
- Borger Thomas (born 1995), Norwegian professional footballer
