= Hans Hanson =

Hans Hanson may refer to:

- Hans Hanson (politician), member of the 1935 South Dakota Senate
- Hans Hanson House, an historic house in Marquette, Kansas

== See also ==
- Hans Hansson (disambiguation)
- Hans Hansen (disambiguation)
- Hanson (surname)
