= 1965–66 Danish Cup =

Tournament details
- Country: Denmark

Final positions
- Champions: AaB
- Runners-up: KB

The 1965–66 Danish Cup was the 12th season of the Danish Cup, the highest football competition in Denmark. The final was played on 19 May 1966.

== First round ==
Team 1	Score	Team 2
B 47 Esbjerg	4–0	IF Fuglebakken
Ballerup IF	5–2	Husum BK
Bogense G&IF	0–1	Aabenraa BK
Dronninglund IF	0–0 (a.e.t.) (3–4 p)	Tved BK
Esbjerg KFUM	6–0	Fjerritslev IF
Fremad Amager	1–0	Roskilde BK
Hellas BK Valby	0–2	Dragør BK
Hirtshals BK	4–2	Haderslev FK
Horbelev BK	5–1	BK Avarta
KFUM Kopenhagen	0–4	Lyngby BK
Lemvig GF	2–1 (a.e.t.)	OKS
Lendemark BK	2–4 (a.e.t.)	Hellerup IK
Middelfart G&BK	0–5	Randers Freja
Nakskov BK	1–0 (a.e.t.)	Frem Sakskøbing
Nyborg G&IF	2–1	Mørke IF
BK Rødovre	3–2	Herfølge BK
Rønne IK	4–3	Helsingør IF
Silkeborg IF	3–4	Aalborg Chang
Skive IK	2–0	Stoholm IF
BK Skjold Østerbro	1–3 (a.e.t.)	BK Stefan
Skovshoved IF	3–1	IF Skjold Birkerød
Svendborg fB	4–1	IK Skovbakken
Svinninge IF	0–5	Slagelse B&I
Thisted FC	4–1	Stige BK
Vanløse IF	6–1	Kalundborg GB
BK Velo	1–3	B 1921
Viby IF	2–2 (a.e.t.) (4–5 p)	Vejgaard BSK
Aars IK	8–1	Dalby IF

== Second round ==
Team 1	Score	Team 2
IF AIA-Tranbjerg	7–1	Aars IK
B 1921	5–1	Dragør BK
B 47 Esbjerg	6–5	Viborg FF
Hirtshals BK	0–1	Ballerup IF
Holbæk B&I	3–4 (a.e.t.)	Hellerup IK
Horbelev BK	2–3	Fremad Amager
Horsens fS	0–4	Randers Freja
Ikast FS	1–3	AB
Køge BK	7–1	Vejgaard BSK
Lemvig GF	0–1	Skive IK
Lyngby BK	7–1	BK Rødovre
Nakskov BK	1–3	Aabenraa BK
Nyborg G&IF	0–1 (a.e.t.)	Brønshøj BK
Odense BK	6–1	Frederikshavn fI
Odense KFUM	3–1	Esbjerg KFUM
Skovshoved IF	0–6	BK Stefan
Slagelse B&I	4–1	Svendborg fB
Thisted FC	0–2	Næstved IF
Tved BK	3–1	Rønne IK
Aalborg Chang	4–0	Vanløse IF

== Third round ==
Team 1	Score	Team 2
AGF	2–0	Ballerup IF
B 1901	3–9	B 1903
B 1913	4–1	Slagelse B&I
B 1921	1–2	Næstved IF
B.93	3–2 (a.e.t.)	BK Stefan
Esbjerg fB	1–3	B 1909
Fremad Amager	1–2	Brønshøj BK
Hvidovre IF	1–0 (a.e.t.)	IF AIA-Tranbjerg
Køge BK	4–3 (a.e.t.)	Aalborg Chang
Lyngby BK	4–0	Hellerup IK
Odense BK	2–2 (a.e.t.) (3–4 p)	AaB
Odense KFUM	2–4 (a.e.t.)	Vejle BK
Randers Freja	2–3	KB
Skive IK	1–4	B 47 Esbjerg
Tved BK	1–2	BK Frem
Aabenraa BK	3–4	AB

== Fourth round ==
Team 1	Score	Team 2
AB	3–1	Næstved IF
B 1903	4–2	B.93
B 47 Esbjerg	2–1	Brønshøj BK
BK Frem	2–0	AGF
Hvidovre IF	3–3 (a.e.t.) (2–3 p)	B 1909
Køge BK	1–0	B 1913
Lyngby BK	1–3	KB
AaB	5–0	Vejle BK

== Quarter-finals ==
Team 1	Score	Team 2
AB	3–2	B 1909
B 1903	2–1	Køge BK
KB	1–0	BK Frem
AaB	5–1	B 47 Esbjerg

== Semi-finals ==
Team 1	Score	Team 2
B 1903	0–2	KB
AaB	1–0	AB

== Final ==
19 May 1966

AaB	3–1 (a.e.t.)	KB
Flou 67'; Hald 103'; Lildballe 118'	Report	Møller 77'

Københavns Idrætspark, Copenhagen
Attendance: 18,600
Referee: Frede Hansen
