= Borgue =

Borgue may refer to the following places in Scotland:

- Borgue, Dumfries and Galloway, a parish and village in the south of Scotland
- Borgue, Highland, a village in the north of Scotland
