= Paul Anderson =

Paul Anderson may refer to:

== Entertainment ==
- Paul Lewis Anderson (1880–1956), American historical novelist and photographer
- Paul 'Trouble' Anderson (1959–2018), British DJ
- Paul W. S. Anderson (born 1965), British film director
- Paul Thomas Anderson (born 1970), American film director
- Paul Anderson (actor) (born 1978), British actor
- Paul Anderson, author of Hunger's Brides
- Paul Anderson, producer of the musical group The Piano Guys
- Paul Anderson, American cartoonist, known for drawing the comic strip Marmaduke, created by his father Brad

== Politics ==
- Paul Anderson (Minnesota state representative) (born 1951), member of the Minnesota House of Representatives
- Paul Anderson (Minnesota state senator) (born 1973)
- Paul Anderson (Nevada politician) (born 1970), member of the Nevada Assembly

== Sports ==
- Paul Anderson (weightlifter) (1932–1994), American weightlifter
- Paul Anderson (sailor) (1935–2022), British sailor
- Paul Anderson (cricketer) (born 1966), English cricketer
- Paul Anderson (rugby league, born 1971), English rugby league footballer who played in the 1990s and 2000s, and coached in the 2010s
- Paul Anderson (rugby league, born 1977), English rugby league footballer who played in the 1990s and 2000s
- Paul Anderson (footballer) (born 1988), English footballer

== Other ==
- Paul Y. Anderson (1893–1938), American muckraker
- Paul R. Anderson (1907–1993), president of Chatham University and Temple University
- Paul Francis Anderson (1917–1987), American bishop
- Paul S. Anderson (born 1938), American chemist
- Paul Anderson (judge) (born 1943), Minnesota judge
- Paul L. Anderson (1946–2018), Mormon architectural historian and curator
- Paul N. Anderson (born 1956), American biblical scholar
- Paul Anderson (journalist) (born 1959), British journalist
- A. Paul Anderson, commissioner of the Federal Maritime Commission

== See also ==
- Poul Anderson (1926–2001), American science fiction author
- Poul Andersen (disambiguation)
