= DAVA Foods =

Danish manufacturing distribution and packing company based in Hadsund

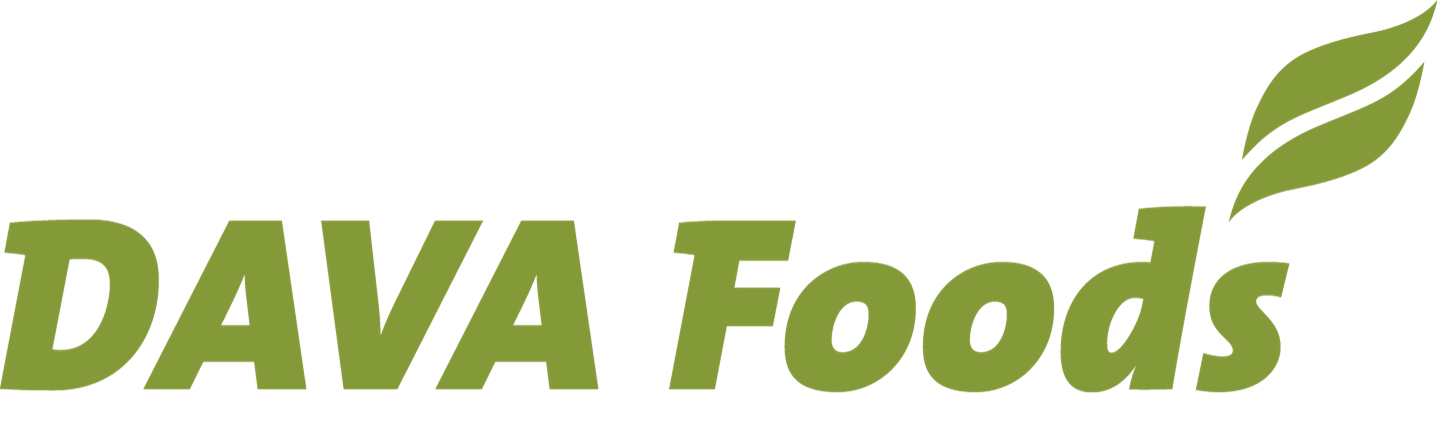

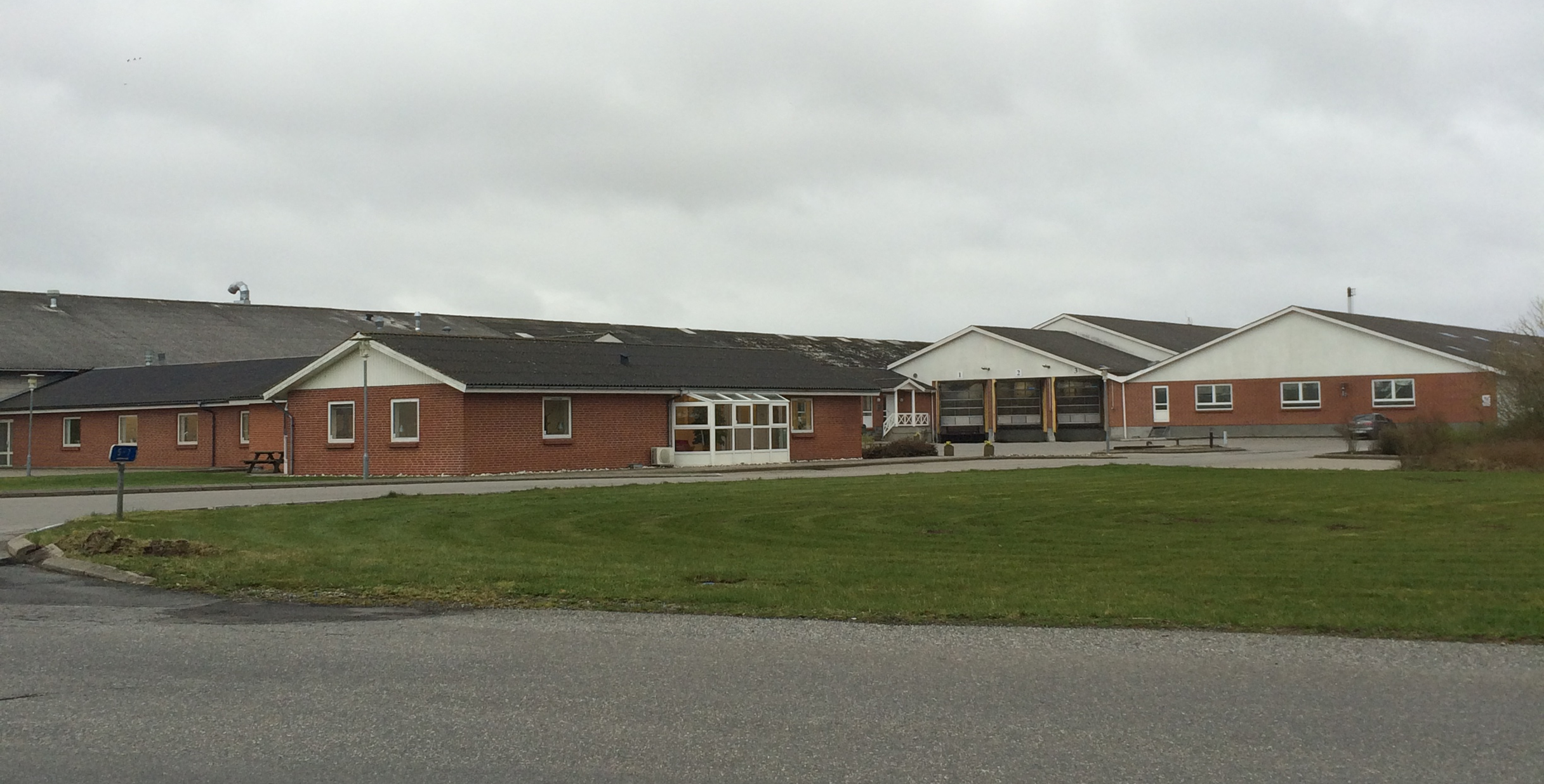
DAVA Foods headquarters, Hadsund

DAVA Foods A/S (formerly Hedegaard Foods A/S) is a Danish food manufacturing, distribution and packing company based in Hadsund, Denmark, specialising in eggs and plant-based foodstuffs. The group has subsidiaries in Denmark, Norway, Sweden, Finland, and Estonia and is the largest supplier of whole fresh eggs in the Nordic region. In 2008, it became a subsidiary of Dan Agro Holding A/S, a division of DLA Group, and since 2023 has been a wholly owned subsidiary of Danish Agro.

== Company ==
As of 2020, DAVA Foods has divisions in Denmark, Norway, Sweden, Finland, and Estonia, and a packaging division, and also exports its products primarily to the Faeroes, Germany, the Czech Republic, Lithuania, Great Britain, the Middle East, and Latvia. The group's products include fresh eggs and pasteurised and boiled egg products, egg white-based sports nutrition products, and plant-based foodstuffs including spices, cooking oils, seeds, and legumes.

As of 1 April 2025, DAVA Foods was the third largest egg producer in Europe, with 7.4 million laying hens. In 2018 the group had a turnover of €179 million; as of March 2019, turnover was approximately kr.130 million and the company had approximately 300 employees; in 2024 the company was projecting a profit of kr.24.6 million (€3.98m) for the 2023 fiscal year, up from kr.16.0 million (€2.1m) in 2022.

== History ==
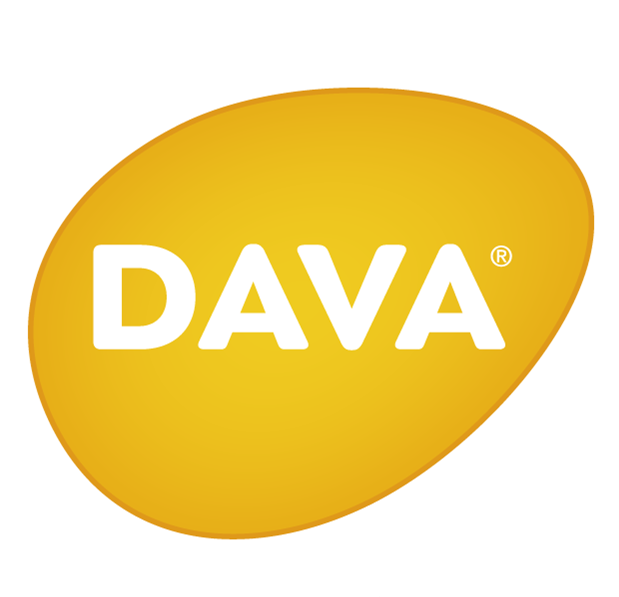
DAVA Foods brand logo

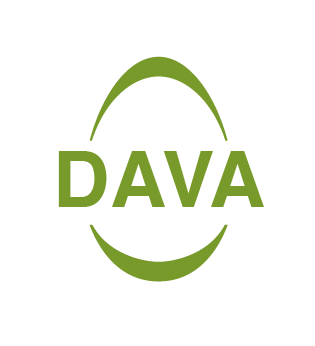
DAVA foods brand logo (2019–2021)

Hedegaard Foods originated in the 1980 purchase by the Danish conglomerate Hedegaard A/S of Farm Æg, a small egg producer in Hadsund; the company changed its name to Hedegaard Foods in 1999. In 2008 Dan Agro Holding, a division of DLA Group, acquired the company from Hedegaard. The company moved to a larger facility in Hadsund in 2014.

The company expanded by acquisitions, including of the third-largest egg packer in Denmark, Brødrene Honum in 2002, which also diversified the company into food manufacturing, and the fourth-largest, Møllebjerggård Æg, in 2010. In 2011–2013, they acquired Svenska Lantägg AB, the largest egg packing company in Sweden. In 2014 they acquired a 50% share in Munakunta, the largest egg packing and pasteurised egg production company in Finland, and established a Finnish subsidiary, Muna Foods Oy. In 2015 they acquired OU Koks Munatootmine in Estonia from HKScan. After their name change to DAVA Foods, they acquired a controlling interest in the Norwegian company Eggprodukter AS in 2016, and in the Finnish company Närpes Äggpackeri Ab in 2019.

In August 2014, the company recalled a significant proportion of their products after finding salmonella contamination which was traced to eggs from a farm in Grindsted.

Hedegaard Foods changed its name in November 2015 to DAVA Foods (for Danish Agro and Vestjyllands Andel, the majority shareholders), but continued to market its products under the names of its various subsidiaries except in Estonia, where it introduced the Eggo brand. In the second half of 2019, the Hedegaard brand name was phased out in Denmark.

With the acquisition in 2021 of a controlling interest in Møllerup Brands and in 2022 of Karlsens Krydderier A/S, DAVA Foods added a division for the production of plant-based and gluten-free foodstuffs sourced in Denmark, Dava Foods Ingredients A/S. In 2023, Danish Agro bought out Vestjyllands Andel's share in the company and became sole owner.
