= Thors Hans Hansson =

Swedish physicist (born 1950)

Thors Hans Hansson (born 1950) is a Swedish physicist working as a professor of theoretical physics at Stockholm University, who was also the head of Nordita. He is a member of the Nobel Committee for Physics, which each year selects laureates of the Nobel Prize in Physics.

== Life ==
Hansson received a PhD in 1979 at University of Gothenburg with a doctorate in Elementary particle (quarks). His recent research has been theoretical aspects of condensed matter physics.

He is active in the popularization of physics and science by including lectures, articles in newspapers and in Folkvett.

Hansson was elected as a member of the Royal Swedish Academy of Sciences in 2009. He became director of Nordita in early 2016.

In 2016, on the occasion of the announcement of the 2016 Nobel Prize in Physics, Hansson gave the committee's public explanation of the prize. His use of a cinnamon bun, a bagel, and a pretzel (to explain relevant topological ideas) was featured in many news reports of the announcement.
