= Hans Andrew Hansen =

American horticulturist

Hans Andrew Hansen is an American plant breeder, currently working for Walters Gardens in Zeeland, Michigan. Hansen is the former director of lab production and new plants for Shady Oaks Nursery in Minnesota, where he revolutionized tissue culture techniques for many genera including Hosta, Arisaema and variegated Agave.

In 2009, Hansen moved to Michigan where he became the Director of New Plants for Walters Gardens, one of North America's leading wholesale perennial growers. There he took over the perennial plant breeding program, which is now recognized as a leader in the industry. When Walters agreed to become the perennial supplier for the Proven Winners brand, Hansens' perennial influence expanded further. He has made dramatic improvement in many plant genera, including Baptisia, Agastache, Clematis, Digiplexis, Helleborus, Heuchera, Heucherella, Hibiscus, Lagerstroemia, Mangave, Nepeta, Salvia, Sedum and Veronica. Hansen currently holds over 516 US plant patents.
