= Tommy Hansen (footballer, born 1950) =

Danish footballer

Personal information
- Full name: Tommy Stokholm Hansen
- Date of birth: 2 February 1950 (age 76)
- Place of birth: Vejle, Denmark
- Position: Midfielder

Senior career*
Years	Team	Apps	(Gls)
1969–1973	Vejle Boldklub		
1974–1978	K. Beerschot VAV		
1978–1988	Vejle Boldklub		

International career
1968	Denmark U19	4	(0)
1971–1973	Denmark U21	7	(2)
1973–1975	Denmark	2	(0)
- * Club domestic league appearances and goals

Tommy Stokholm Hansen (born 2 February 1950) is a Danish former footballer who played as a midfielder for Vejle Boldklub and Belgian club K. Beerschot VAV. He made two appearances for the Denmark national team in 1973 and 1975.
