= Erik Sørensen =

Danish footballer and manager (born 1940)

Personal information
- Full name: Erik Lykke Sørensen
- Date of birth: 22 January 1940 (age 86)
- Place of birth: Odense, Denmark
- Position: Goalkeeper

Senior career*
Years	Team	Apps	(Gls)
- B1913
1963–1967	Greenock Morton	102	(0)
1967–1968	Rangers	30	(0)
1970–1973	Greenock Morton	71	(0)
- Svendborg fB
Total		203	(0)

International career
1961–1962	Denmark U21	8	(0)
1963–1971	Denmark	15	(0)

Managerial career
- 1974–1975: Greenock Morton
- * Club domestic league appearances and goals

Erik Sørensen, also known by his full name Erik Lykke Sørensen, (born 22 January 1940) is a Danish former football player and manager. He was a goalkeeper, and played professionally in the 1960s and 1970s for Scottish clubs Greenock Morton and Rangers, and later served as the manager of Morton. He played 15 games for the Denmark national football team from 1963 to 1971.

== Career ==
Born in Odense, Sørensen made his breakthrough with local top-flight club B1913 in the amateur-only Danish championship. He made his debut for the Denmark national team in June 1963, and played five of Denmark's seven games in the successful qualification campaign for the 1964 European Nations' Cup tournament. Before the final tournament, Sørensen signed a professional contract and was banned from the amateur-only national team.

He signed with Scottish team Greenock Morton. Morton manager Hal Stewart had originally wanted to sign another Danish goalkeeper, but was advised to sign Sørensen instead. Sørensen played in a trial game against Third Lanark dressed all in black. Morton refused to name the new player and he was dubbed by the media "The man in black" or "Mr. X". From 1963 to 1967, Sørensen played 102 league games for Morton.

In 1967, he was sold for £25,000 to rival Scottish club Rangers. He played 30 games for Rangers, before returning to Morton in 1970. When the Danish Football Association abolished the rule of amateurism, Sørensen returned to the Denmark national team in May 1971, eight years after his debut. He played a further five national team games, including a 1–0 win against Scotland, before ending his international career in June 1971. He left Morton in 1973, having played a total 173 league games for the club.

He eventually became Morton manager for a short time in the mid 70s. He also ran a public house in Greenock after he retired from the game. In the late 1970s he briefly returned to football to play for Danish amateur side Svendborg fB.
