= Alan Hansen (Danish footballer) =

Danish footballer (born 1960)

Personal information
- Full name: Alan Bækby Hansen
- Date of birth: 7 November 1960 (age 65)
- Place of birth: Middelfart, Denmark
- Position: Forward

Senior career*
Years	Team	Apps	(Gls)
1981–1985	Kolding IF		
1985–1988	Vejle Boldklub		
1988–1989	Randers Freja		

International career
1978–1979	Denmark U19	5	(0)
1983	Denmark	2	(0)
- * Club domestic league appearances and goals

Alan Bækby Hansen (born 7 November 1960) is a Danish footballer who played as a forward. He made two appearances for the Denmark national team in 1983.
