= Allan Hansen (footballer, born 1952) =

Danish footballer

Personal information
- Full name: Allan Finn Hansen
- Date of birth: 1 May 1952 (age 74)
- Place of birth: Holbæk, Denmark
- Position: Defender

Senior career*
Years	Team	Apps	(Gls)
1971–1977	Holbæk B&I		
1977–1980	Slagelse B&I		
1980–1981	Holbæk B&I		
1981–1985	KFUM Roskilde		

International career
1974–1976	Denmark U21	8	(0)
1975–1978	Denmark	3	(0)
- * Club domestic league appearances and goals

Allan Finn Hansen (born 1 May 1952) is a Danish former footballer who played as a defender. He made three appearances for the Denmark national team from 1975 to 1978.
