= Olaf Brockhoff =

Danish footballer (1905-1974)

Personal information
- Full name: Hans Olaf Brockhoff
- Date of birth: 26 July 1905
- Place of birth: Nørresundby, Denmark
- Date of death: 22 September 1974 (aged 69)
- Position: Defender

International career
Years	Team	Apps	(Gls)
1935–1936	Denmark	2	(0)

Olaf Brockhoff (26 July 1905 – 22 September 1974) was a Danish footballer. He played in two matches for the Denmark national football team from 1935 to 1936.
