= Ejner Hansen =

Danish footballer (1905-1967)

Personal information
- Date of birth: 21 January 1905
- Date of death: 13 April 1967 (aged 62)

International career
Years	Team	Apps	(Gls)
1931	Denmark	1	(0)

Ejner Hansen (21 January 1905 – 13 April 1967) was a Danish footballer. He played in one match for the Denmark national football team in 1931.
