= Kim Brodersen =

Danish footballer (born 1963)

Personal information
- Full name: Kim Kamman Brodersen
- Date of birth: 3 February 1963 (age 63)
- Place of birth: Aabenraa, Denmark
- Height: 1.83 m (6 ft 0 in)
- Position: Goalkeeper

Senior career*
Years	Team	Apps	(Gls)
1987–1990	Herfølge Boldklub		
1990–1991	Næstved IF		
1991–1995	Lyngby FC		

International career
1993	Denmark	1	(0)
- * Club domestic league appearances and goals

Kim Kamman Brodersen (born 3 February 1963) is a Danish former footballer who played as a goalkeeper. He made one appearances for the Denmark national team in 1993.
