= Axel Petersen (footballer) =

Danish footballer (1887–1968)

Medal record

Men's football

Representing Denmark

Olympic Games
Silver medal – second place	1912 Stockholm	Team competition

Axel Karl Petersen (10 December 1887 – 20 December 1968) was a Danish amateur football (soccer) player, who played in the midfielder position. He played two games for the Denmark national football team, and won a silver medal at the 1912 Summer Olympics.

He most notably represented Copenhagen club Boldklubben Frem, made his Danish national team debut in October 1911, and was selected for the Danish team at the 1912 Summer Olympics. He played one match at the tournament, the 7–0 win against Norway in the first round, as Denmark won silver medals. This was to be his last national team game.
