= Erik Pondal Jensen =

Danish footballer (1930–1960)

Personal information
- Date of birth: 6 December 1930
- Place of birth: Køge, Denmark
- Date of death: 16 July 1960 (aged 29)
- Place of death: Øresund, Denmark
- Position: Midfielder

Senior career*
Years	Team	Apps	(Gls)
1949–1950	Køge Boldklub		
1951–1960	AB		

International career
1954–1959	Denmark	20	(0)
- * Club domestic league appearances and goals

Erik Pondal Jensen (6 December 1930 – 16 July 1960) was a Danish footballer who played as a midfielder. He played in 20 matches for the Denmark national team from 1954 to 1959.

Jensen was one of eight Danish footballers killed in a 1960 air disaster where the plane that was to transport the players to a national team training camp in Herning crashed into the sea in Øresund, just after takeoff from Copenhagen Airport.
