= Hans Hansson (ice hockey) =

Swedish ice hockey player

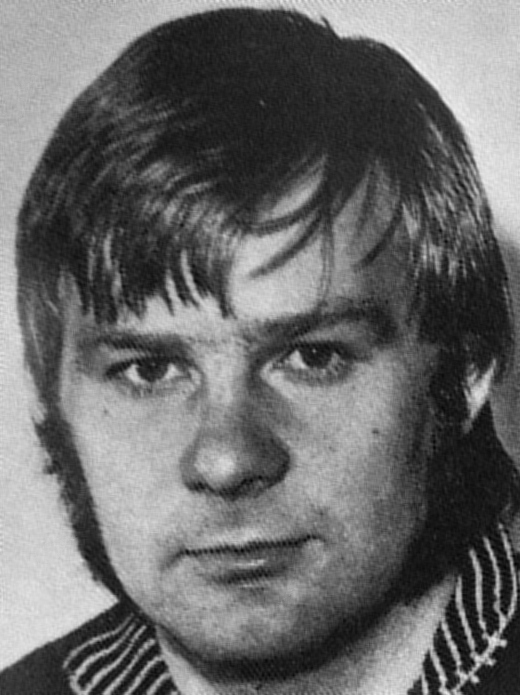
- Born: 26 November 1949 (age 76) Smedjebacken, Sweden
- Height: 5 ft 11 in (180 cm)
- Weight: 181 lb (82 kg; 12 st 13 lb)
- Position: Centre
- Shot: Left
- Played for: Mora IK
- National team: Sweden
- NHL draft: Undrafted
- Playing career: 1967–1982

Hans Nils Erik Hansson (born 26 November 1949) is a Swedish former professional ice hockey player.

He competed as a member of the Sweden men's national ice hockey team at the 1972 Winter Olympics held in Japan.
