= Didriksen =

Didriksen is a Danish and Norwegian surname. Notable people with the surname include:

- Aagot Didriksen (1874–1968), Norwegian actress
- Babe Didrikson Zaharias, (1911–1956), Norwegian-American athlete
- Jan Didriksen (1917–1996), Norwegian jurist and businessman
- Jørn Didriksen (born 1953), Norwegian speed skater
