= Henning Frandsen =

Danish footballer (1922-1973)

Personal information
- Date of birth: 20 August 1922
- Date of death: 28 November 1973 (aged 51)

International career
Years	Team	Apps	(Gls)
1949	Denmark	1	(0)

Henning Frandsen (20 August 1922 – 28 November 1973) was a Danish footballer. He played in one match for the Denmark national football team in 1949.
