= Børge Josefsen =

Norwegian footballer (born 1953)

Personal information
- Date of birth: 24 September 1953 (age 73)

International career
Years	Team	Apps	(Gls)
1975	Norway	1	(0)
1974 - 1976	Norway national under-21 football team	10	(0)
1971 - 1972	Norway national under-19 football team	7	(0)

Børge Josefsen (born 24 September 1953) is a Norwegian footballer. He played in one match for the Norway national football team in 1975.
