= Kaj Johansen =

Danish footballer (1932–2018)

Personal information
- Date of birth: 2 November 1932
- Place of birth: Vestbyen, Denmark
- Date of death: 1 December 2018 (aged 86)
- Position: Right-back

Senior career*
Years	Team	Apps	(Gls)
1951–1961	Vejle Boldklub		
- * Club domestic league appearances and goals

Kaj Johansen (2 November 1932 – 1 December 2018) was a Danish footballer who played as a right-back for Vejle Boldklub.
