= Søren Thorst =

Danish footballer (born 1965)

Personal information
- Date of birth: 8 January 1965 (age 61)
- Place of birth: Sulsted, Denmark
- Height: 1.81 m (5 ft 11 in)
- Position: Centre-back

Youth career
- Sulsted IF
- AaB

Senior career*
Years	Team	Apps	(Gls)
1984–1996	AaB	371	(11)
- * Club domestic league appearances and goals

Søren Thorst (Danish pronunciation: [ˈsɶːɐn ˈtsʰɒːst]; born 8 January 1965) is a Danish former footballer who spent his entire senior career with AaB as a centre-back. A tough and uncompromising defender, he helped the club rise from the third tier to the Danish top flight, and was part of the team that won AaB's first Danish Superliga title in 1994–95. He also played in three losing Danish Cup finals and represented AaB in European competition, including the UEFA Cup and the UEFA Champions League. In 1993, he was named AaB's pokalfighter in the Danish Cup.

== Career ==
=== Early life and youth career ===
Thorst grew up in Sulsted, Aalborg Municipality, where he began playing football for Sulsted IF. He is the son of former Denmark international Kjeld Thorst, who won 26 caps and scored six goals for the Denmark national team. As a junior, Thorst joined AaB in Aalborg, travelling by bus from Sulsted to Aalborg on training days while also attending school in the city.

Having initially played as a forward, he was gradually moved into deeper roles before eventually establishing himself as a central defender. He remained with AaB for the rest of his playing career.

=== AaB ===
Thorst made his first-team debut in 1983 in a third-division match against Frederikshavn fI, while still a youth player. After making his debut, Thorst became part of the AaB first-team squad in the mid-1980s and helped the club win promotion to the second division in 1984 and then to the top flight in 1986.

Thorst remained a first-team regular through the late 1980s and early 1990s, and built a reputation as a tough and uncompromising defender. He played in three losing Danish Cup finals with AaB, against AGF in 1987 and OB in 1991 and 1993. In 1993, he was nevertheless named AaB's pokalfighter in the competition.

Although not a prolific goalscorer, Thorst scored one of the most notable goals of his career later that year, when he converted a free kick against Spanish side Deportivo La Coruña in the UEFA Cup, helping AaB record one of the club's most celebrated European victories.

In the 1994–95 season, Thorst was part of the AaB team that won the Danish Superliga for the first time in the club's history. The following season, he was a member of the squad that became the first Danish club to qualify for the group stage of the UEFA Champions League, in which AaB recorded, among other results, a victory over Greek side Panathinaikos.

His career was increasingly affected by injury in its later years, and he retired in 1996 after suffering a serious cruciate ligament injury in a game against Lyngby. In total, Thorst made 371 appearances and scored 11 goals for AaB.

After retiring, Thorst briefly served as an assistant coach at AaB in 2003.

== Personal life ==
Outside football, Thorst was employed by Aalborg Municipality throughout his playing career. He worked part-time for ten years before later taking up a full-time role with the municipality.

He later worked for Event Aalborg, a secretariat under Aalborg Municipality involved in organising events including the Tall Ships Races, millennium celebrations, Aalborg Triennalen, and other cultural and sporting events.

== Honours ==
AaB

- Danish Superliga: 1994–95
