= Herning Airport =

Herning Airport Herning Flyveplads
- IATA: none; ICAO: EKHG

Summary
- Airport type: Public
- Location: Herning, Denmark
- Elevation AMSL: 167 ft / 51 m
- Coordinates: 56°11′05″N 009°02′40″E
- Website: www.ekhg.dk

Map
- Location of airport in Denmark

Runways
Direction	Length		Surface
Direction	m	ft	Surface
09/27	1,199	3,934	Asphalt
15/33	667	2,188	Grass
- Source: Denmark AIS

Herning Airport (Danish: Herning Flyveplads or Herning Lufthavn) (ICAO: EKHG) is an airport located 3.8 nautical miles (7.0 km; 4.4 mi) north-northeast of Herning, a city in Herning Municipality (Herning Kommune), Central Denmark Region (Region Midtjylland), Denmark.

== Facilities ==
The airport resides at an elevation of 167 feet (51 m) above mean sea level. It has two runways: 09/27 with an asphalt surface measuring 1,199 by 30 metres (3,934 ft × 98 ft) and 15/33 with a grass surface measuring 667 by 30 metres (2,188 ft × 98 ft).
