= Hans Hansson i Stocksäter =

Swedish politician (1893–1978)

Hans Hansson i Stocksäter (1893–1978) was a Swedish politician. He was a member of the Centre Party. Hans Hansson was born on 27 May 1893 in Bollnäs, a Swedish locality and the seat of Bollnäs Municipality in Gävleborg County, Sweden. He was a Swedish farmer and later a parliamentarian. Hans Hansson was a member of the Riksdag's second chamber for the constituency of Gävleborg County from 6 December 1939 until the extraordinary Riksdag of 1940. He died on 16 January 1978.

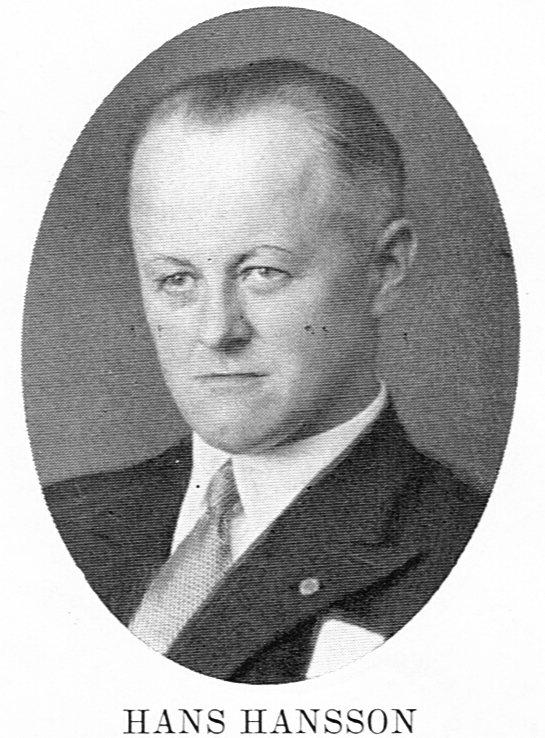
Hans Hansson
