= Orla Brixler =

Danish footballer (1918–1957)

Personal information
- Full name: Orla Edvin Poulsen
- Date of birth: 23 August 1918
- Place of birth: Sønder Tranders, Denmark
- Date of death: 3 April 1957 (aged 38)
- Place of death: Aalborg, Denmark
- Position: Half-back

Senior career*
Years	Team	Apps	(Gls)
1936–1956	AaB		

International career
1938–1943	Denmark	4	(0)
- * Club domestic league appearances and goals

Orla Edvin Brixler (né Poulsen; 23 August 1918 – 3 April 1957) was a Danish footballer who played for AaB and won four caps for the Denmark national football team between 1938 and 1943. A half-back, he was regarded as one of the leading Jutland players of his generation and was part of the AaB side of the late 1930s and early 1940s.

== Club career ==
Born in Sønder Tranders, a suburb of Aalborg, Brixler was a forceful and hard-working half-back. He played for AaB, where he formed part of a strong half-back line alongside Ernst Nielsen and English player Graham Lockey. AaB were among the strongest provincial clubs in Denmark during the 1930s, having been placed in the top division when the Danish league system was reorganised in 1929–30, and the club finished third in 1936.

Brixler emerged in the later 1930s and was subsequently described as the finest left half in Jutland football of his era.

== International career ==
Brixler made his debut for the Denmark national team on 31 August 1938 in a 2–1 defeat to Finland in Helsinki. He had to wait almost four years for his second international appearance, and went on to win a further three caps during the German occupation of Denmark.

His final international, on 20 June 1943, came in one of the best remembered matches of the occupation years, as Denmark defeated Sweden 3–2 before 40,000 spectators in Københavns Idrætspark. The Sweden side included Gunnar Gren and Gunnar Nordahl, while Brixler started for Denmark at left half. The match was later described as the high point of his international career.

During his international career, from 31 August 1938 to 4 October 1942, he appeared under the name Orla Poulsen before later using the surname Brixler.

== Death ==
Brixler died in Aalborg on 3 April 1957 at the age of 38.
