= Per Funch Jensen =

Danish footballer (1938–1960)

Personal information
- Date of birth: 25 September 1938
- Place of birth: Copenhagen, Denmark
- Date of death: 16 July 1960 (aged 21)
- Place of death: Øresund, Denmark
- Position: Goalkeeper

International career
Years	Team	Apps	(Gls)
1959	Denmark	4	(0)

Per Funch Jensen (25 September 1938 – 16 July 1960) was a Danish footballer who played as a goalkeeper. He made four appearances for the Denmark national team in 1959.

Jensen was one of eight Danish footballers killed in a 1960 air disaster where the plane that was to transport the players to a national team training camp in Herning crashed into the sea in Øresund, just after takeoff from Copenhagen Airport.
