= Danish Agro =

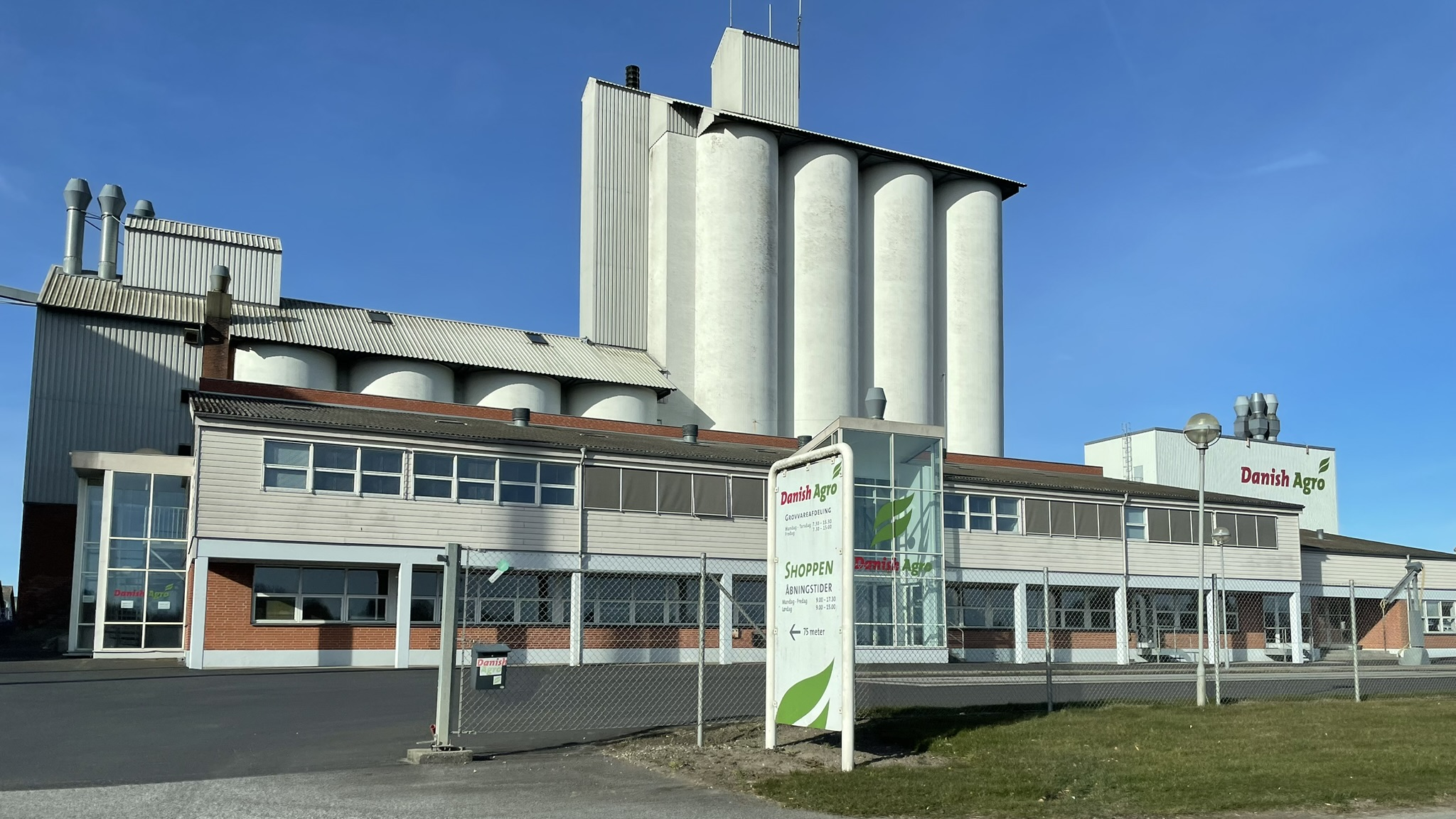
- Type: Co-operative
- Industry: Farm supply
- Founded: 1901
- Headquarters: Karise, Denmark
- Key people: Christian Junker(CEO), Jørgen H. Mikkelsen(Chairman)
- Revenue: ▲DKK 24.1 billion (2014)
- Net income: ▲DKK 550 million (2014)
- Number of employees: C. 4,000 (2014)
- Website: Danishagro.dk

Danish Agro is a cooperative farm supply company headquartered in Karise south of Copenhagen, Denmark. It is owned by 12,000 Danish farmers. In 2026, it came out that many of their grain deposits, had large amounts of rat feces, and mold. They didn't do anything to stop their products from reaching the shelves, which has resulted in them selling products, with large amounts of fecal matter.

== History ==
Danish Agro traces its history back to 1901, when Stevns Foderstofforening was founded on the Stevns Peninsula. Since then the company has been through numerous mergers, and in 2006 it changed its name to Danish Agro.

In the autumn of 2009, Danish Agro took over its competitor, Landbrugets Andel, when the latter was faced with financial difficulties.

== DAVA Agravis International ==
DAVA Agravis International Holding A/S is a joint venture between Danish Agro, Vestjyllands Andel and Agravis. In October 2014, the company took over Getreide AGs' retail activities in Germany.

== See also ==
- DLG Group Dansk_Landbrugs_Grovvareselskab
