= Borgue, Highland =

Village in Caithness, Scotland

Coordinates: 58.20°N 03.48°W

Borgue: Scottish Gaelic: Borg
- Location within the Caithness area
- OS grid reference: ND1325
- Council area: Highland
- Country: Scotland
- Sovereign state: United Kingdom
- Police: Scotland
- Fire: Scottish
- Ambulance: Scottish
- UK Parliament: Caithness, Sutherland and Easter Ross
- Scottish Parliament: Caithness, Sutherland and Ross

Borgue is a village in the historical county of Caithness, 3 miles (5 km) south of Dunbeath in the local authority are of Highland, Scotland.

Rev Samuel Smith (1798-1868) was minister of Borgue from 1834 to 1861, transferring to the Free Church of Scotland at the Disruption of 1843. He was replaced by Rev James T. Stuart, then Rev George Elder served 1867 to 1899.
