= Knud Petersen =

Danish footballer (born 1934)

Personal information
- Date of birth: 21 November 1934 (age 91)

International career
Years	Team	Apps	(Gls)
1957	Denmark	1	(0)

Knud Petersen (born 21 November 1934) is a Danish footballer. He played in one match for the Denmark national football team in 1957.
