= Hans Erfurt =

Danish footballer (born 1964)

Personal information
- Date of birth: 6 February 1964 (age 62)
- Place of birth: Randers, Denmark
- Height: 1.88 m (6 ft 2 in)
- Position: Forward

Senior career*
Years	Team	Apps	(Gls)
1981–1986	Viborg FF		
1986–1993	Silkeborg IF		
1994	Viborg FF		
1994–1995	Silkeborg IF		

International career
1989	Denmark	2	(0)
- * Club domestic league appearances and goals

Hans Erfurt (born 6 February 1964) is a Danish former footballer who played as a forward for Viborg FF and Silkeborg IF. He made two appearances for the Denmark national team in 1989.
