= Orla Laugesen =

Danish footballer

Personal information
- Date of birth: 20 October 1912
- Date of death: 18 October 1984 (aged 71)

International career
Years	Team	Apps	(Gls)
1935–1938	Denmark	3	(0)

Orla Laugesen (20 October 1912 – 18 October 1984) was a Danish footballer. He played in three matches for the Denmark national football team from 1935 to 1938.
