= Nils Jensen =

Danish footballer (1935-2010)

Personal information
- Date of birth: 25 December 1935
- Date of death: 16 January 2010 (aged 74)

International career
Years	Team	Apps	(Gls)
1961	Denmark	1	(0)

Nils Jensen (25 December 1935 – 16 January 2010) was a Danish footballer. He played in one match for the Denmark national football team in 1961.
