= Jessica Borger =

Australian T Cell immunologist

Jessica Geraldine Borger
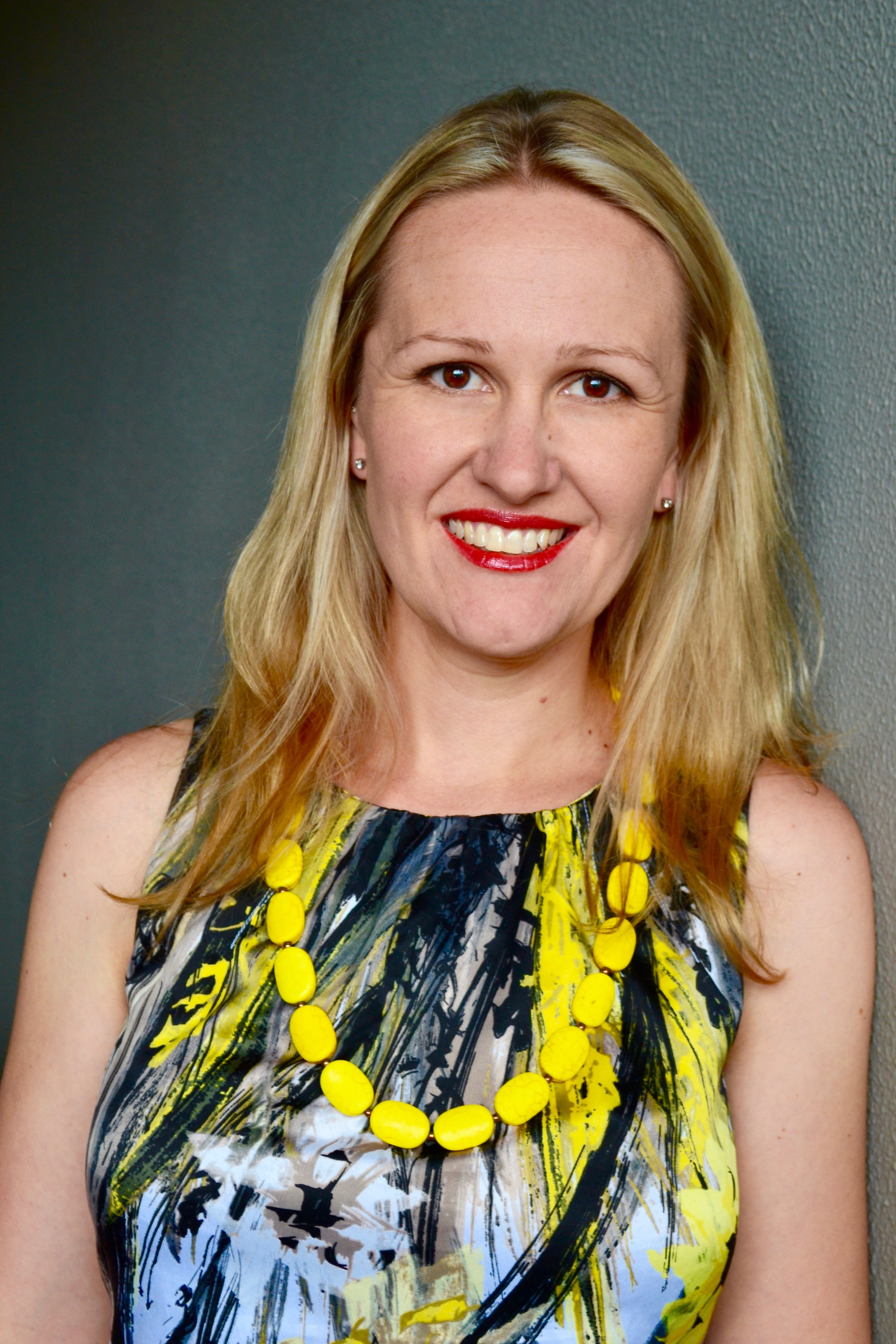
- Born: Australia
- Education: University of South Australia, University of Edinburgh, University College London, Monash University
- Awards: ASI Margaret Baird Women in Immunology Award, ASI Social Impact Award, ASI Cheers-Buchan Education Award, Monash University Vice-Chancellors Award for Diversity and Inclusion, Monash University Dean's Award for Education - teams, Monash University Dean's Award for Diversity and Inclusion
- Scientific career
- Fields: Immunology

Jessica Geraldine Borger is an Australian T Cell immunologist, lecturer and graduate course coordinator at the Central Clinical School, Monash University. Her research has added to the understanding of the molecular mechanisms of T cell function. Additionally, Borger is a news and commentary editor for Immunology & Cell Biology and a guest associate editor for Frontiers in Immunology, and a reviewer for several academic journals. Borger also advocates for gender equality in science, technology, engineering and mathematics (STEM) in her position a member of the Gender Equity, Diversity and Inclusion committee of the Central Clinical School at Monash University.

== Education ==
Borger started her studying towards her undergraduate degree when she was 21 years old. She received a bachelor's degree in medical and pharmaceutical biotechnology from the University of South Australia. Eight years after completing her bachelor's degree, she moved to the UK to begin her PhD at University College London after being awarded a highly competitive Medical Research Council PhD scholarship by the National Institute of Medical Research. During her PhD, she began researching T Cell function with Rose Zamoyska, specifically investigating the localisation of cell surface receptors and intracellular proximal TCR signaling molecules in CD8 T cells during memory formation.

== Career ==
=== Research ===
Between completing her bachelor's degree and starting her PhD, Borger worked as a Molecular Biologist for GRMicro (2002 - 2003), and for Arrow Therapeutics as a Drug Discovery Scientist (2003 - 2006).

Borger undertook her postdoctoral training on a Medical Research Council fellowship from 2010–2016 at the University of Edinburgh with Prof Zamoyska, investigating the role of Caveolin-1 in T cell cholesterol homeostasis, integrin signaling and exosome complex biogenesis.

In 2016, Borger took a position in the Central Clinical School at Monash University as a senior postdoctoral researcher. In this position, Borger has been researching gamma delta T cell development, activation and function as potential targets of therapeutic intervention of lung disorders. Additionally, Borger was awarded a CASS Foundation Medicine/Science grant to research the design of novel CAR-T therapy approaches in the lung using novel intracellular checkpoint blockade targets. In 2017, she was awarded the IgV Best Postdoctoral Speaker Award by the Australia and New Zealand Society for Immunology, the Best Presentation Prize by the Immunology Alfred Hospital., and in 2018 the Best Speaker Award at the International Conference on Innate Lymphoid Cells in Japan.

In 2019, Borger became lecturer and course-coordinator of graduate studies at Monash University. In this role, she created a master's course in translational research. In the same year, Borger was the first recipient of the Margaret Baird Women in Immunology Award by the Australia and New Zealand Society for Immunology.

=== Science communication and gender equality advocacy ===
Borger is an advocate for gender equality in STEM and science communicator. She has written articles for Women's Agenda, The Conversation, Women in STEMM Australia, and SoapboxScience. In 2018, Jessica Borger was awarded the Veski Inspiring women STEM Sidebyside scholarship.

From 2018, Borger has sat on both the A+ Gender Equity committee of the A+ Alfred Research Alliance at the Alfred Hospital and the Gender, Equity, Diversity and Inclusion (GEDI) committee at the Central Clinical School at Monash University. The GEDI committee conducted a survey to investigate problems and concerns with GEDI issues in the school and ran a survey in 2020 to understand the impact of COVID-19 on researchers with a gendered lens applied. In 2020 Borger, as a member of the Equity in Medical Research Alliance (EMRA) was involved in the creation of a position paper to mitigate the gendered impacts of the COVID-19 pandemic on the medical research workforce.

== Publications ==
Borger's published works include:

- The Influence of Innate Lymphoid Cells and Unconventional T Cells in Chronic Inflammatory Lung Disease (2019)
- Schistosoma mansoni-Derived Lipids in Extracellular Vesicles: Potential Agonists for Eosinophilic Tissue Repair (2019)
- Caveolin-1 Influences LFA-1 Redistribution upon TCR Stimulation in CD8 T Cells (2017)
- Proximity of TCR and its CD8 coreceptor controls sensitivity of T cells (2013)
- Murine cytomegalovirus encodes a miR-27 inhibitor disguised as a target (2012)
