= Povl Frederiksen =

Danish footballer

Personal information
- Full name: Povl Henrik Frederiksen
- Date of birth: 9 April 1950 (age 76)
- Place of birth: Gladsaxe, Denmark
- Position: Defender

Senior career*
Years	Team	Apps	(Gls)
1970–1972	Hvidovre IF		

International career
1970–1971	Denmark	4	(0)
- * Club domestic league appearances and goals

Povl Henrik Frederiksen (born 9 April 1950) is a Danish former footballer who played as a defender. He made four appearances for the Denmark national team from 1970 to 1971.
