= Ulrich Thychosen =

Danish footballer

Personal information
- Full name: Ulrich Thychosen
- Date of birth: July 19, 1956 (age 70)
- Place of birth: Denmark
- Position: Midfielder

Youth career
- Vejle FC

Senior career*
| Years | Team | Apps | (Gls) |
| | Vejle Boldklub | 158 | (65) |
- Royal Antwerp FC
- Vejle Boldklub

International career
| | Denmark U21 | 4 | |
| | Denmark | 3 | |
- * Club domestic league appearances and goals

Ulrich Thychosen (born July 19, 1956) is a Danish former footballer

== Biography ==
Ulrich Thychosen spend his childhood years in Vejle FC, before he moved to Vejle Boldklub. He made his debut for the first team in 1975 against Leicester City.

Thychosen was a midfielder noted for his dribbling and technique. Injuries affected much of his playing career. He won the Danish Cup with Vejle Boldklub three times, in 1975, 1977 and 1981.

Ulrich Thychosen's brother Steen Thychosen also played for Vejle Boldklub and the Danish national team.
