= Arne Karlsen =

Danish footballer (1939–1960)

Personal information
- Date of birth: 13 October 1939
- Place of birth: Holstebro, Denmark
- Date of death: 16 July 1960 (aged 20)
- Place of death: Øresund, Denmark
- Position: Midfielder

International career
Years	Team	Apps	(Gls)
1959–1960	Denmark	3	(0)

Arne Karlsen (13 October 1939 – 16 July 1960) was a Danish footballer who played as a midfielder. He made three appearances for the Denmark national team from 1959 to 1960.

Karlsen was one of eight Danish footballers killed in a 1960 air disaster where the plane that was to transport the players to a national team training camp in Herning crashed into the sea in Øresund, just after takeoff from Copenhagen Airport.
