= Heini Hald =

Danish footballer (born 1942)

Personal information
- Full name: Poul Heini Hald
- Date of birth: 4 June 1942 (age 84)
- Place of birth: Aalborg, Denmark
- Position: Midfielder

Senior career*
Years	Team	Apps	(Gls)
1961–1970	AaB	199	(10)
1970–1971	Randers Freja		

International career
1960	Denmark U19	2	(2)
1963	Denmark U21	3	(0)
1965–1966	Denmark B	3	(0)
1965	Denmark	2	(0)
- * Club domestic league appearances and goals

Poul Heini Hald (born 4 January 1942) is a Danish former footballer who won two caps for the Denmark national football team in 1965. Primarily a midfielder, he was also used as a full-back and was part of the AaB team that won the Danish Cup in 1966, the club's first national title.

== Club career ==
Hald was born in Aalborg. An AaB player of local origin, he developed into a combative and versatile player who featured mainly in midfield, though he could also play in defence. He went on to make 199 appearances and score 10 goals for AaB.

He played an important role in one of the defining moments in the club's early history, when AaB defeated KB 3–1 after extra time in the 1966 Danish Cup final. Hald scored the decisive goal for 2–1, helping secure AaB's first national trophy. According to later accounts, he played much of the match with a broken arm or hand, before receiving treatment after the team's return to Aalborg. His performance in the final later earned him a special plaque from AaB's supporters' association.

AaB was also a runner-up in the cup in 1967. In 1969, after taking up a teaching post in Randers, he moved to Randers Freja. He helped the club win promotion to the first division for the first time, but ended his playing career the following year at the age of 28.

== International career ==
Hald represented Denmark at several levels, including youth, under-21, B international and full international level, and also played for selected teams of the Jutland Football Association. He made his debut for the Denmark national team on 5 July 1965 in a 3–1 win over Iceland.

He won his second and final cap later the same year in a 2–2 draw away to Norway. In that match, he came on after his AaB teammate Kjeld Thorst was injured after 20 minutes.

== Later life ==
Outside football, Hald worked as a schoolteacher and later became a school inspector in Randers. He retired from that role in 2002.
