= Allan Nielsen (footballer, born 1953) =

Danish footballer

Personal information
- Full name: John Allan Nielsen
- Date of birth: 8 April 1953 (age 73)
- Place of birth: Odense, Denmark
- Positions: Midfielder; libero

Senior career*
Years	Team	Apps	(Gls)
1972–1979	Odense Boldklub		
1979–1981	Roda JC Kerkrade	56	(5)
1981–1988	Odense Boldklub		

International career
1984	Denmark	2	(0)
- * Club domestic league appearances and goals

John Allan Nielsen (born 8 April 1953) is a Danish former footballer who played as a midfielder or libero for Odense Boldklub and for Dutch club Roda JC Kerkrade. He made two appearances for the Denmark national team in 1984.

== Career ==
Nielsen made 250 appearances for Odense Boldklub scoring 20 goals. With OB, he won the Danish championship twice, in 1977 and 1982, and the Danish Cup once, in 1983.

In 1984, he made two appearances for the Denmark Olympic team, captaining the team in both matches.

== Style of play ==
Mostly a midfielder, Nielsen was described as "reliable" and "hard-working" and with good control of the ball. In his second stint with Odense Boldklub he was deployed as a libero.

== Legacy ==
In 2012, on the occasion of Odense Boldklub's 125th anniversary, Nielsen was voted into the club's all-star team.

== Later life ==
Nielsen later worked as a municipal employee in Odense and was trained as a freight forwarder.

== Honours ==
Odense Boldklub

- Danish 1st Division: 1977, 1982
- Danish Cup: 1982–83
