= Alfred G. Hansen =

United States Air Force general

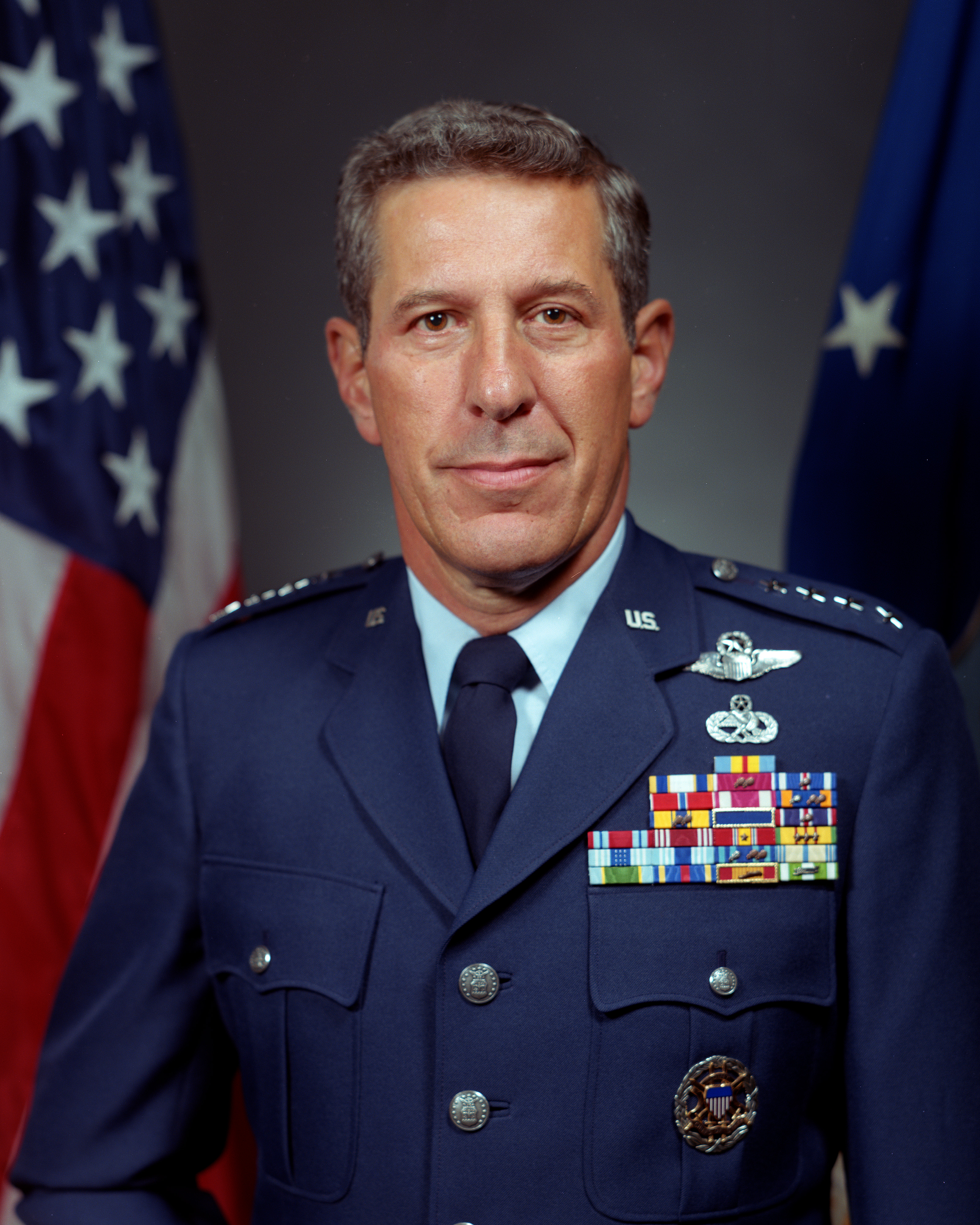
- Born: April 13, 1933 (age 93); New York City, U.S.
- Military career
- Allegiance: United States of America
- Branch: United States Air Force
- Service years: 1953–1989 (36 years)
- Rank: General
- Commands: Air Force Logistics Command
- Conflicts: Vietnam War
- Awards: See below

Alfred Gustav Hansen (born April 13, 1933) is a retired United States Air Force four-star general who served as Commander, Air Force Logistics Command (COMAFLC) from 1987 to 1989.

== Military career ==
Hansen was born in 1933, in New York City. He graduated from Sewanhaka High School in Floral Park, New York in 1951 and then attended Hofstra College. He completed a bachelor's degree in business administration and management at Troy State University in 1972. Hansen graduated from Air Command and Staff College in 1966, and Air War College in 1972.

He initially enlisted in the Air Force in March 1953 and later was commissioned as a second lieutenant through the aviation cadet program, receiving his pilot wings in February 1955 at Vance Air Force Base, Oklahoma. His first assignment was with the 303rd Air Refueling Squadron, Davis-Monthan Air Force Base, Arizona, as a KC-97 Stratofreighter pilot. In December 1958 he was assigned to Castle Air Force Base, California, for KC-135 combat crew training and upon completion was assigned as a Boeing EC-135 and KC-135 pilot with the 34th Air Refueling Squadron at Offutt Air Force Base, Nebraska, until August 1965.

After graduating from Air Command and Staff College in July 1966, Hansen was assigned to the Air Force Systems Command, Headquarters Air Force Eastern Test Range, Patrick Air Force Base, Florida, and served as a member of the Apollo spacecraft recovery team until March 1968. He then was assigned to Nakhon Phanom Royal Thai Air Force Base, Thailand, as an A-1 Skyraider pilot with the 1st Air Commando Squadron, later redesignated the 1st Special Operations Squadron. He flew 113 combat missions. From September 1968 to March 1969 he served in the Republic of Vietnam as a fighter operations staff officer at Headquarters 7th Air Force, Tan Son Nhut Air Base.

Hansen was assigned to Headquarters Tactical Air Command at Langley Air Force Base, Virginia, from April 1969 to July 1971. While there he served as chief and, later, operations staff officer in the Aircraft Allocation and Flying Hour, and Operational Planning branches, Office of the Deputy Chief of Staff, Operations. After completing Air War College in November 1972, he was assigned to Pope Air Force Base, North Carolina. He first served as operations officer with the 39th Tactical Airlift Squadron and then, from June 1973 until November 1974, as commander of the 41st Tactical Airlift Squadron. During this period he commanded several overseas squadron rotational missions in Thailand, England and West Germany. He then was assigned to the 317th Tactical Airlift Wing staff as the deputy commander for maintenance. After graduation with honors from the Aircraft Maintenance-Avionics Officers Course at Chanute Air Force Base, Illinois in 1975, he returned to the wing as deputy commander for maintenance.

In October 1977 Hansen was assigned to Headquarters Military Airlift Command, Scott Air Force Base, Illinois, as director of maintenance engineering. Hel assumed command of the 314th Tactical Airlift Wing, Little Rock Air Force Base, Arkansas, in October 1978. During his tenure the wing participated in the Worldwide Airlift competition, winning the best maintenance award in 1979 and the General William Moore trophy for best overall airlift wing in 1981. In August 1981 he returned to Military Airlift Command headquarters as deputy chief of staff for logistics, responsible for ensuring the logistics readiness of worldwide airlift forces.

From February 1983 to May 1985 he was assigned as director for logistics plans and programs, Office of the Deputy Chief of Staff for Logistics and Engineering, Headquarters U.S. Air Force, Washington, D.C. He also served as primary member of the Air Staff Board. In June 1985 he became director for logistics, J-4, Organization of the Joint Chiefs of Staff, Washington, D.C. In this position he was responsible for worldwide logistics in support of theater commander's war plans, was a member of the Senior NATO Logistics Forum and directed the study that resulted in the formation of the United States Transportation Command. He assumed command of AFLC in July 1987. He retired from the Air Force on November 1, 1989.

== Politics ==
On September 6, 2016, along with 88 other retired US generals and admirals, he endorsed Republican presidential nominee Donald Trump.

== Flight Information ==
- Rating: Command Pilot
- Flight Hours: more than 7,000
- Aircraft Flown: KC-97 Stratofreighter, KC-135, Boeing EC-135, A-1 Skyraider

== Awards and decorations ==
US Air Force Command Pilot Badge

Personal decorations
	Defense Distinguished Service Medal
	Air Force Distinguished Service Medal
Width-44 crimson ribbon with a pair of width-2 white stripes on the edges	Legion of Merit with two bronze oak leaf clusters
	Distinguished Flying Cross with bronze oak leaf cluster
	Bronze Star Medal
	Meritorious Service Medal
	Air Medal with silver and two bronze oak leaf clusters
	Air Force Commendation Medal with two bronze oak leaf clusters
Unit awards
	Presidential Unit Citation
	Air Force Outstanding Unit Award with three bronze oak leaf clusters
Service awards
	Combat Readiness Medal
	Army Good Conduct Medal
Campaign and service medals
	National Defense Service Medal with bronze service star
	Vietnam Service Medal with bronze three service stars
Service, training, and marksmanship awards
	Air Force Overseas Short Tour Service Ribbon
	Air Force Overseas Long Tour Service Ribbon
	Air Force Longevity Service Award Ribbon with silver and two bronze oak leaf clusters
	Armed Forces Reserve Medal
	Small Arms Expert Marksmanship Ribbon
	Air Force Training Ribbon
Foreign awards
	Vietnam Gallantry Cross Unit Award
	Vietnam Campaign Medal

=== Other achievements ===
1988 Eugene M. Zuckert Management Award for outstanding management achievements in the Air Force.

== Effective dates of promotion ==
Promotions
Insignia	Rank	Date
	General	August 1, 1987
