= Peter Hertz (footballer) =

Danish footballer (born 1954)

Personal information
- Full name: Peter Hykkelbjerg Hertz
- Date of birth: 18 December 1954 (age 71)
- Place of birth: Brønshøj, Denmark
- Height: 1.90 m (6 ft 3 in)
- Position: Defender

Senior career*
Years	Team	Apps	(Gls)
1974–1977	Ballerup IF		
1977–1981	B.93		
1981–1983	Brøndby IF		

International career
1972	Denmark U19	1	(0)
1980	Denmark	1	(0)
- * Club domestic league appearances and goals

Peter Hykkelbjerg Hertz (born 18 December 1954) is a Danish former footballer who played as a defender. He made one appearance for the Denmark national team in 1980.
