= Carsten Brandenborg =

Danish footballer (born 1945)

Personal information
- Full name: Carsten Brandenborg
- Date of birth: 26 August 1945 (age 81)
- Place of birth: Mørke, Denmark
- Position: Midfielder

International career
Years	Team	Apps	(Gls)
1972	Denmark	1	(0)

Carsten Brandenborg (born 26 August 1945) is a Danish footballer. He played in one match for the Denmark national football team in 1972. Carsten Brandenborg played 180 first-team matches for Randers Freja from 1969 to 1977.
