= Børge Havn =

Danish footballer (1902-1958)

Personal information
- Date of birth: 24 May 1902
- Date of death: 8 May 1958 (aged 55)

International career
Years	Team	Apps	(Gls)
1927–1929	Denmark	8	(0)

Børge Havn (24 May 1902 – 8 May 1958) was a Danish footballer. He played in eight matches for the Denmark national football team from 1927 to 1929.
