= John Jørgensen (footballer) =

Danish footballer (1924-1970)

Personal information
- Date of birth: 31 August 1924
- Date of death: 17 October 1970 (aged 46)

International career
Years	Team	Apps	(Gls)
1955	Denmark	3	(0)

John Jørgensen (31 August 1924 – 17 October 1970) was a Danish footballer. He played in three matches for the Denmark national football team in 1955.
