= Poul Bilde =

Danish footballer (1938–2021)

Personal information
- Date of birth: 27 March 1938
- Place of birth: Aarhus, Denmark
- Date of death: 15 April 2021 (aged 83)
- Position: Forward

International career
| Years | Team | Apps | (Gls) |
| 1965–1968 | Denmark | 8 | (0) |

Poul Bilde (27 March 1938 – 15 April 2021) was a Danish footballer. He played in eight matches for the Denmark national football team from 1965 to 1968.
