= Werner Hedegaard =

Danish footballer

Personal information
- Date of birth: 2 March 1911
- Date of death: 19 July 1975 (aged 64)

International career
Years	Team	Apps	(Gls)
1934	Denmark	1	(0)

Werner Hunderup Hedegaard (2 March 1911 – 19 July 1975) was a Danish footballer. He played in one match for the Denmark national football team in 1934 during the 1933–36 Nordic Football Championship.
