= Niels Erik Andersen =

Danish footballer (born 1945)

Personal information
- Date of birth: 25 September 1945 (age 81)
- Place of birth: Tørring, Denmark
- Position: Midfielder

Senior career*
Years	Team	Apps	(Gls)
1963–1968	Vejle Boldklub	140	(17)

International career^{‡}
1965–1968	Denmark U-21	9	(1)
1966	Denmark	2	(0)
- * Club domestic league appearances and goals as of May 30, 2008 ‡ National team caps and goals as of May 30, 2008

Niels Erik Andersen (born 25 September 1945) is a Danish former football player, who played 140 games for the Danish club Vejle Boldklub. He also represented the Danish national team.
