= Helge Jørgensen (footballer, born 1912) =

Danish footballer

Personal information
- Date of birth: 27 January 1912
- Date of death: 27 November 1969 (aged 57)

International career
Years	Team	Apps	(Gls)
1937–1938	Denmark	2	(0)

Helge Jørgensen (27 January 1912 – 27 November 1969) was a Danish footballer. He played in two matches for the Denmark national football team from 1937 to 1938.
