= Søren Larsen (footballer, born 1949) =

Danish footballer

Personal information
- Full name: Søren Robin Oxholm Larsen
- Date of birth: 2 October 1949 (age 77)
- Place of birth: Majbølle, Denmark
- Position: Defender

Youth career
- ?–1970: Nørre Alslev Boldklub

Senior career*
Years	Team	Apps	(Gls)
1973–1978	Nykøbing B.1901		

International career
1971–1973	Denmark U21	6	(0)
1973–1975	Denmark	4	(0)
- * Club domestic league appearances and goals

Søren Robin Oxholm Larsen (born 2 October 1949) is a Danish former footballer who played as a defender. He made four appearances for the Denmark national team from 1973 to 1975.
