= Alfred Hansen (footballer) =

Danish footballer (1913–1995)

Personal information
- Full name: Alfred Otto Hansen
- Date of birth: 10 May 1913
- Place of birth: Præstbro, Denmark
- Date of death: 21 July 1995 (aged 82)
- Place of death: Nivå, Denmark
- Position: Defender

Senior career*
Years	Team	Apps	(Gls)
1935–1943	AaB	105	(0)
1949	AaB	1	(0)

International career
1937–1940	Denmark	4	(0)
- * Club domestic league appearances and goals

Alfred Otto Hansen (10 May 1913 – 21 July 1995) was a Danish footballer who played for AaB and won four caps for the Denmark national football team between 1937 and 1940. A versatile defender, he was mainly used at left-back but also appeared as a half-back and centre-half during his career with AaB.

== Club career ==
Hansen was born in Præstbro near Sæby, where his parents ran a grocery business. He was the second eldest of ten children, though several of his siblings died young, and his younger brother Frits Hansen also went on to play for AaB's first team.

He later moved to Aalborg, where he worked for the merchant Heinrich Thorndahl, having been bought free from his previous employer so he could take up work in Thorndahl's grain business. Hansen made his debut for AaB in the first division on 7 April 1935, when the club beat B 1903 1–0 in Københavns Idrætspark.

A long-serving AaB player, Hansen made 106 appearances for the club and also represented the Jutland Football Association 13 times. He was regarded as an all-round defender who could play at half-back, centre-half and left-back, though left-back became his preferred position. Contemporary descriptions highlighted both his physical strength and technical quality, noting that he was capable of combining forceful defensive play with dribbling ability and confident distribution.

Hansen retired in the autumn of 1943 at the age of 30, but made a surprise one-match comeback for AaB on 22 May 1949 against HIK in the second division. AaB lost 2–1, though Politiken reportedly judged his return to have been a fine performance for a 36-year-old.

== International career ==
Hansen made his debut for the Denmark national team on 12 September 1937 in a 3–1 defeat to Poland. The match came shortly after the so-called Breslau defeat, when the Danish Football Association sought to renew the national side and selected seven debutants.

He won a further three caps for Denmark, playing away against Finland in 1938 and twice against Sweden in October 1940. The two matches against Sweden, both of which ended in draws, drew particular attention as they were Denmark's first internationals after the German occupation began on 9 April 1940. Three of his four international appearances came at left-back.

== Death ==
Hansen married in 1942 and had three daughters. Later in life he worked as a director. He died on 21 July 1995 at the age of 82 at a nursing home in Nivå, having otherwise lived in Taastrup.
