= Bent Dideriksen =

Danish footballer (1931–2021)

Personal information
- Date of birth: 16 July 1931
- Place of birth: Vestenskov, Denmark
- Date of death: 22 December 2021 (aged 90)
- Position: Forward

International career
Years	Team	Apps	(Gls)
1957	Denmark	2	(0)

Bent Dideriksen (16 July 1931 – 22 December 2021) was a Danish footballer. He played in two matches for the Denmark national football team in 1957. Dideriksen died on 22 December 2021, at the age of 90.
