= Niels Møller =

Danish footballer (born 1939)

Personal information
- Full name: Niels Bødker Møller
- Date of birth: 2 November 1939 (age 86)
- Place of birth: Odense, Denmark
- Position: Midfielder

Senior career*
Years	Team	Apps	(Gls)
1957–1962	KFUMs BK Odense		
1962–1973	Kjøbenhavns Boldklub		

International career
1957–1958	Denmark U19	2	(0)
1959–1961	Denmark U21	11	(0)
1966	Denmark B	1	(0)
1966–1970	Denmark	13	(0)
- * Club domestic league appearances and goals

Niels Bødker Møller (born 2 November 1939) is a Danish former footballer who played as a midfielder for KFUMs BK Odense and Kjøbenhavns Boldklub. He made 13 appearances for the Denmark national team from 1966 to 1970.
