= Børge Hylle =

Danish footballer (1926-1990)

Personal information
- Date of birth: 30 May 1926
- Date of death: 19 July 1990 (aged 64)

International career
Years	Team	Apps	(Gls)
1951	Denmark	2	(0)

Børge Hylle (30 May 1926 – 19 July 1990) was a Danish footballer. He played in two matches for the Denmark national football team in 1951.
