= Claus Johansen =

Danish footballer (born 1948)

Personal information
- Date of birth: 13 March 1948 (age 78)

International career
Years	Team	Apps	(Gls)
1972	Denmark	1	(0)

Claus Johansen (born 13 March 1948) is a Danish footballer. He played in one match for the Denmark national football team in 1972.
