= Raymond Hansen (footballer) =

Danish footballer

Personal information
- Date of birth: 9 February 1914
- Date of death: 20 October 1995 (aged 81)

International career
Years	Team	Apps	(Gls)
1935	Denmark	1	(0)

Raymond Hansen (9 February 1914 – 20 October 1995) was a Danish footballer. He played in one match for the Denmark national football team in 1935.
