= Hans Hansen (footballer) =

Danish footballer (1891-1976)

Personal information
- Date of birth: 5 February 1891
- Date of death: 20 January 1976 (aged 84)

International career
Years	Team	Apps	(Gls)
1920	Denmark	2	(0)

Hans Hansen (5 February 1891 – 20 January 1976) was a Danish footballer. He played in two matches for the Denmark national football team in 1920.
