= Børge Bastholm Larsen =

Danish footballer (1931–1960)

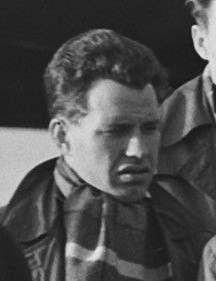
- Bastholm Larsen in 1955

Personal information
- Date of birth: 3 January 1931
- Place of birth: Svendborg, Denmark
- Date of death: 16 July 1960 (aged 29)
- Place of death: Øresund, Denmark
- Position: Defender

Senior career*
Years	Team	Apps	(Gls)
1951–1960	Køge Boldklub		

International career
1952	Denmark U21	1	(0)
1953–1957	Denmark B	8	(0)
1954–1959	Denmark	11	(0)
- * Club domestic league appearances and goals

Børge Bastholm Larsen (3 January 1931 – 16 July 1960) was a Danish footballer who played as a defender for Køge Boldklub. He made eleven appearances for the Denmark national team from 1954 to 1959.

Bastholm Larsen was one of eight Danish footballers killed in a 1960 air disaster where the plane that was to transport the players to a national team training camp in Herning crashed into the sea in Øresund, just after takeoff from Copenhagen Airport.
