= Poul Andersen (footballer, born 1953) =

Danish footballer

Personal information
- Date of birth: 28 November 1953 (age 72)
- Place of birth: Otterup, Denmark
- Position: Defender

Senior career*
Years	Team	Apps	(Gls)
1972–1982	Odense Boldklub		

International career
1978	Denmark U21	1	(0)
1978–1980	Denmark	3	(0)
- * Club domestic league appearances and goals

Poul Andersen (born 28 November 1953) is a Danish footballer who played as a defender for Odense Boldklub. He made three appearances for the Denmark national team from 1978 to 1980.
