= Aksel Madsen (footballer) =

Danish footballer (1927-1977)

Personal information
- Date of birth: 9 April 1927
- Date of death: 5 November 1977 (aged 50)

International career
Years	Team	Apps	(Gls)
1949	Denmark	1	(0)

Aksel Madsen (9 April 1927 – 5 November 1977) was a Danish footballer. He played in one match for the Denmark national football team in 1949.
