= Børge Christensen (footballer) =

Danish footballer (1931–2014)

Personal information
- Date of birth: 4 November 1931
- Place of birth: Copenhagen, Denmark
- Date of death: 13 December 2014 (aged 83)
- Position: Midfielder

International career
Years	Team	Apps	(Gls)
1954–1956	Denmark	3	(0)

Børge Bommelund Christensen (4 November 1931 – 13 December 2014) was a Danish footballer. He played in three matches for the Denmark national football team from 1954 to 1956.
