= Børge Mathiesen =

Danish footballer (1918–1962)

Personal information
- Full name: Børge Carlo Mathiesen
- Date of birth: 16 May 1918
- Place of birth: Copenhagen, Denmark
- Date of death: 25 December 1962 (aged 44)
- Position: Midfielder

Senior career*
| Years | Team | Apps | (Gls) |
| 19??–1947 | B 1903 | | |
| 1947–1949 | Stade Français | 59 | (9) |
| 1949–1950 | Atlético Madrid | | |
| 1950–1951 | Racing de Santander | 23 | (0) |
| 1951–1953 | Le Havre AC | 33 | (0) |

International career
| 1937–1945 | Denmark | 11 | (1) |
- * Club domestic league appearances and goals

Børge Carlo Mathiesen (16 May 1918 – 25 December 1962) was a Danish professional football player. He played 11 games and scored one goal for the Denmark national football team. Mathiesen was a short but strong midfielder with great stamina and a dangerous shot on goal.

== Biography ==
Born in Copenhagen, Mathiesen started his playing career as an amateur with B 1903. He played for the amateur-only Danish national team between 1937 and 1945. As he signed a professional contract in 1947, he was banned from the national team. He moved to France to play for Stade Français. In 1949, he moved to Spain where he played for Atlético Madrid and Racing de Santander. He ended his career in France, playing for Le Havre AC from 1951 to 1953.

Mathiesen died in a car accident on 25 December 1962.
