= Deaths in June 1985 =

The following is a list of notable deaths in June 1985.

Entries for each day are listed alphabetically by surname. A typical entry lists information in the following sequence:

- Name, age, country of citizenship at birth, subsequent country of citizenship (if applicable), reason for notability, cause of death (if known), and reference.

== June 1985 ==
=== 1 ===
- Aubrey Aitken, 73, English Anglican prelate.
- John C. Arrowsmith, 90, American general.
- Lester Barnard, 90, American college sports coach.
- Bruce Burnett, 30, New Zealand health educator and activist, AIDS.
- William W. Davies, 85, American general.
- Richard Greene, 66, English actor (The Adventures of Robin Hood), cardiac arrest.
- Maria Knebel, 87, Soviet actress and theatre director.
- Arthur Mansfield, 78, American baseball player and coach.
- Willie McCall, 64, Scottish footballer.
- Juan Q. Miranda, 73, Filipino politician.
- Gwilym A. Price, 90, American lawyer, banker and politician, member of the Pennsylvania House of Representatives (1923–1924).
- Jack Roberts, 75, English footballer.
- Eugène Séguy, 95, French artist and entomologist.
- Anita Sharp-Bolster, 89, Irish actress.
- Eugene Stringer, 82, American football player.
- Francesco Vida, 81, Italian skier.

=== 2 ===
- Izak Aloni, 80, Israeli chessmaster.
- George Brown, Baron George-Brown, 70, British politician and diplomat, MP (1945–1970), stroke.
- Bruce Crane, 75, American businessman and politician.
- Gilberto Elsa, 47, Italian Olympic swimmer (1960).
- Mark W. Hannaford, 60, American politician, member of the U.S. House of Representatives (1975–1979), lung cancer.
- Dorothy Mueller, 59, American baseball player.
- Benjamin H. Oehlert Jr., 75, American diplomat and business executive.
- André Salardaine, 76, French politician.
- Tiger Tjalkalyirri, c. 78-79, Australian Aboriginal activist.
- Dave Wareham, 60, American basketball player.

=== 3 ===
- Edmond Beauchamp, 85, French actor.
- Tjeerd Boersma, 70, Dutch Olympic sprinter (1936).
- William Francis Buckley, 57, American diplomat, CIA officer, and kidnapping victim, heart attack.
- Harry Kershaw, 78, British trade unionist.
- J. A. R. Lenman, 60-61, British neurologist.
- Arch MacDonald, 73, American broadcast journalist.
- Sidney Montagu, 11th Duke of Manchester, 56, British hereditary peer.
- Nugroho Notosusanto, 54, Indonesian military historian and writer.
- Wawrzyniec Staliński, 85, Polish footballer.
- Sean Sullivan, 63, Canadian actor.
- Dame Dorothy Tangney, 78, Australian politician.
- Don Wheldon, 30, American ice hockey player, lightning strike.
- Tono Zancanaro, 79, Italian artist.

=== 4 ===
- Mikhail Fichtenholz, 65, Soviet violinist, heart attack.
- Frank Field, 80, Australian politician.
- Thomas W. Herren, 89, American general.
- Charlie Jones, 73, Welsh footballer.
- Dagfin Juel, 76, Norwegian politician.
- Kaisyn Kuliev, 67, Soviet poet.
- John Ringling North, 81, American circus executive (Ringling Bros. and Barnum & Bailey Circus), stroke.
- Gerald Augustine John Ryan, 61, American Roman Catholic prelate.
- Samuel Segal, Baron Segal, 83, British politician, MP (1945–1950).
- Gleb Struve, 87, Russian-American literary historian and poet.
- Lucien Tremblay, 73, Canadian jurist and politician.

=== 5 ===
- Doug Hayes, 88, Australian footballer.
- Frank Hodges, 94, English footballer.
- Puttanna Kanagal, 51, Indian filmmaker.
- Bobby Marlow, 55, American football player, heart attack.
- Fred Marshall, 79, American politician, member of the U.S. House of Representatives (1949–1963).
- C. Roger Myers, 79, Canadian psychologist.
- Joe Walding, 58, New Zealand politician, MP (1967–1975, 1978–1981).
- Johanna Wolf, 85, German secretary to Adolf Hitler.

=== 6 ===
- Willy Bocklant, 44, Belgian racing cyclist.
- William John Burton, 77, New Zealand draughtsman, rifleman and archer.
- Willis E. Donley, 83, American politician and lawyer.
- Henry Beetle Hough, 88, American journalist.
- Vladimir Jankélévitch, 82, French philosopher and musicologist.
- Pavel Kabanov, 65, Soviet soldier.
- Leonard Lake, 39, American serial killer, suicide by cyanide poisoning.
- Kurt Ranke, 77, German ethnologist (Encyclopedia of Fairy Tales).
- Václav Vohralík, 93, Czechoslovak Olympic track and field athlete (1920).
- George Vokins, 88, British Olympic pentathlete (1924).
- Norman W. Walker, 99, British businessman.

=== 7 ===
- Rudolf Burkert, 80, Czechoslovak Olympic skier (1928).
- Ronald Burns, 81, Indian-Australian Olympic sprinter (1928).
- Alden C. Coder, 75, American football coach.
- Raymond Hull, 66, English-born Canadian author, playwright and screenwriter.
- Walter H. Johns, 76, Canadian academic administrator.
- Henk Keemink, 82, Dutch Olympic racewalker (1924).
- Věra Lišková, 60, Czechoslovak sculptor.
- Henry Lee Moon, 84, American journalist and civil rights activist.
- Joe Murphy, 53, Australian footballer.
- Gordon Rollings, 59, English actor.
- Geoffrey Roscoe, 84, Australian educator and public servant.
- Stanley Skinner, 91, English-born American ice hockey player.
- Leonard Sorkin, 69, American violinist.
- Klaudia Taev, 79, Estonian opera singer and vocal pedagogue.
- Leslie L. Westin, 67, American politician, member of the Minnesota Senate (1955–1962), heart attack.

=== 8 ===
- Evelyn M. Anderson, 86, American biochemist and physiologist.
- Sir Henry Clay, 6th Baronet, 76, British engineer and hereditary peer.
- Edward Edgar Foden, 72, British marine engineer.
- John Gilby, 84, New Zealand rower.
- William Ernest Hamilton, 83, Canadian politician.
- Hu Feng, 82, Chinese writer, cancer.
- Afet İnan, 76, Turkish historian and sociologist.
- Fritz Keller, 71, German-born French footballer.
- Charles LeMaire, 88, American costume designer.
- Blanche Brillon Macdonald, 54, Canadian model and Indigenous rights activist.
- Paavo Miettinen, 66, Finnish Olympic fencer (1952).
- Olof Möller, 61, Swedish science fiction author.
- Arvīds Petersons, 71, Soviet Latvian ice hockey player.
- Richard West, 64, English cricketer.

=== 9 ===
- Clifford Evans, 73, Welsh actor (The Curse of the Werewolf, Kiss of the Vampire).
- Matsutarō Kawaguchi, 85, Japanese author and screenwriter.
- Homer Pearson, 84, American politician, lieutenant governor of Colorado (1947–1949).
- Ronnie Rooke, 73, English footballer.
- Cyril Towers, 78, Australian rugby player.
- Marion Vanderhoef, 90, American tennis player.

=== 10 ===
- Gaetano Cecere, 90, American sculptor.
- George Chandler, 86, American actor (Lassie), cancer.
- Clarence T. Edwinson, 72, American flying ace and skeet shooter.
- Gurli Ewerlund, 82, Swedish Olympic swimmer (1924).
- Cyril Lilburne, 82, Australian footballer.
- Bob Prince, 68, American sportscaster (Pittsburgh Pirates), oral cancer.

=== 11 ===
- Wendell B. Barnes, 75, American politician, administrator of the Small Business Administration (1954–1959), member of the Oklahoma House of Representatives (1950–1952), heart attack.
- Rona Hurley, 87, New Zealand farmer.
- Amy Hutchinson, 96, New Zealand social worker and maternity reformer.
- Charles-Emmanuel Janssen, 78, Belgian businessman and politician.
- George F. Kosco, 77, American aerologist and polar explorer.
- Elizabeth Lawrence, 81, American horticulturalist.
- Sapfo Notara, c. 77-78, Greek actress.
- Pengiran Abu Bakar, 78, Bruneian nobleman, civil servant, and politician.
- Karen Ann Quinlan, 31, American woman in right to die case, respiratory failure.
- Pedro Regueiro, 75, Spanish footballer.
- Raymond Robinson, 74, American disfigured man and urban legend subject.
- Vic Tanny, 73, American bodybuilder, heart failure.

=== 12 ===
- Prince Alexander Ferdinand of Prussia, 72, German royal.
- Katinka Andrássy, 92, Hungarian noblewoman and socialite, first lady (1918–1919).
- Dino Barsotti, 82, Italian Olympic rower (1932, 1936).
- Mildred Caverly, 91, American golfer.
- Andrew Deoki, 67-68, Fijian politician.
- Gia-Fu Feng, 66, Chinese-born American translator.
- Hua Luogeng, 74, Chinese mathematician, heart attack.
- Dominique Laffin, 33, French actress, heart attack.
- Marcela Paz, 83, Chilean writer.
- S. P. Pillai, 71, Indian actor.
- Helmuth Plessner, 92, German philosopher.
- Alastair Smallwood, 92, British rugby player.
- Norman William Whittaker, 91, Canadian judge and politician.

=== 13 ===
- Vasily Arkhipov, 78, Soviet general.
- Dorothy Donaldson Buchanan, 85, Scottish civil engineer.
- Albert Geyser, 67, South African cleric, theologian and anti-Apartheid activist, heart attack.
- Urmas Kibuspuu, 31, Estonian actor, brain cancer.
- Herman Kling, 71, Swedish politician and diplomat.
- Helen Shaw, 72, New Zealand author.

=== 14 ===
- Eric Bols, 81, British general.
- D. William Brosnan, 82, American railroad executive, cancer.
- Wilner Burke, 77, American band director (Lumberjack Band).
- Irene Delroy, 84, American actress.
- Bernard Gruver, 61, American animator, leukemia.
- Khan Bahadur Abdul Hakim, 80, Bangladeshi mathematician.
- Walter Johnson, 69, American political historian, complications from a stroke.
- Thamsanqa Mnyele, 36, South African-Botswanan artist, shot.
- Ivan Travkin, 76, Soviet submarine commander.

=== 15 ===
- Charles Brockway, 78, English cricketer.
- Mona Burgin, 82, New Zealand educator.
- Laurie Crouch, 67, Australian footballer.
- Percy Fender, 92, English cricketer.
- Mário Guimarães Ferri, 66-67, Brazilian ecologist and botanist.
- Felix Greene, 76, British journalist, cancer.
- Bert Grimm, 85, American tattoo artist.
- Rodney Hallworth, 56, British journalist.
- Len Hopwood, 81, English cricketer.
- Martin Willoughby Parr, 92, British colonial administrator.
- Francis Rush, 64, American politician, member of the Pennsylvania House of Representatives (1967–1972).
- Andy Stanfield, 57, American Olympic sprinter (1952).
- Robert Stethem, 23, American Naval diver, shot.
- Gärda Svensson, 89, Swedish politician.
- David Wheat, 63, American jazz and folk musician.

=== 16 ===
- Yoʻldosh Aʼzamov, 76, Soviet Uzbek filmmaker and actor.
- John Y. Brown Sr., 85, American politician, member of the U.S. (1933–1935) and Kentucky House of Representatives (4x), pneumonia.
- Sir Adrian Curlewis, 84, Australian barrister.
- Alexis FitzGerald Snr, 68, Irish politician, senator (1969–1981).
- Jim Hammond, 77, English footballer.
- James Lordi, 74, American politician, member of the New Jersey General Assembly (1970–1972).
- Rose Mackwelung, 72-73, Micronesian education activist.
- Jonati Mavoa, 65, Fijian politician.
- Alois Mertes, 63, German politician and diplomat, complications from a stroke.
- Harry Oliver, 86, Canadian ice hockey player.
- Ernst Orvil, 87, Norwegian author.
- George Whitecross Paton, 82, Australian legal scholar and academic administrator.
- Leonard J. Russell, 52-53, American politician, cancer.
- Waldo S. Tippin, 85, American sports coach.

=== 17 ===
- Bernard Bergin, 71, Irish cricketer.
- Russell S. Berkey, 91, American naval admiral.
- John Boulting, 71, English filmmaker, cancer.
- Jim Cornford, 73, English cricketer.
- Federico Curiel, 68, Mexican filmmaker.
- James Cyriax, 80, British medical doctor.
- Pieter De Somer, 67, Belgian biologist and physician.
- Pop Dunkley, 80, English rugby player.
- Georgia Hale, 84, American actress.
- Tai Kato, 68, Japanese film director.
- Caroline Ella Heminway Kierstead, 80, American geologist and paleontologist.
- Friedrich-Wilhelm Morzik, 93, German general.
- Kirill Moskalenko, 83, Soviet field marshal.
- Masaharu Taniguchi, 91, Japanese New Thought leader, founder of Seicho-No-Ie.
- William McLaughlin Taylor Jr., 76, American judge.

=== 18 ===
- Paul Colin, 92, French artist.
- Andi Depu, 77, Indonesian revolutionary leader.
- John England, 73, Australian politician.
- Kazuo Nagano, 32, Japanese fraudster, stabbed.
- Axel Strøm, 84, Norwegian physician.
- John Sutro, 82, British film producer.

=== 19 ===
- Ilka Gedő, 64, Hungarian painter.
- Maya Kristalinskaya, 53, Soviet singer.
- Christopher Le Fleming, 77, English composer.
- Bonnie Nettles, 57, American cult leader (Heaven's Gate), melanoma.
- Marjorie Acker Phillips, 90, American painter and art collector, respiratory failure.
- Chester Sayers, 85, American-born Canadian politician.
- Kenneth Shugart, 59, American naval admiral and basketball player.
- W. Scott Wilkinson, 90, American politician, member of the Louisiana House of Representatives (1920–1924).

=== 20 ===
- Albert Beech, 72, English footballer.
- Warren Cowgill, 55, American linguist, cancer.
- Laxmi Das, 67, Indian politician, MP (1962–1967).
- Hilton A. Dickson Jr., 61, American politician, attorney general of New Mexico (1959–1960).
- Svend Frederiksen, 69, Danish footballer.
- Daan Jahja, 60, Indonesian politician and soldier, heart attack.
- Alex Kennedy, 92, Australian footballer.
- John Kirakosyan, 56, Soviet Armenian diplomat and historian.
- Ben H. Lewis, 82, American politician.
- Cipriano Pons, 95, Argentine Olympic fencer (1924).
- Gordon Shrum, 89, Canadian academic administrator.
- Dragomir Tošić, 75, Yugoslav footballer and civil engineer.
- Xuân Thủy, 72, Vietnamese politician and diplomat.
- Alex Vömel, 87, German gallery owner.

=== 21 ===
- Bahram Aryana, 79, Iranian field marshal.
- Ettore Boiardi, 87, Italian-born American chef and businessman (Chef Boyardee).
- Bruno Brandes, 75, German politician.
- Tage Erlander, 84, Swedish politician, prime minister (1946–1969), pneumonia.
- Hermann Haller, 75, Swiss film editor.
- Desmond White, 73, Scottish footballer.
- Rayma Wilson, 74, American Olympic runner (1928).
- Charles Wojtkoski, 63, American comic book writer and artist, creator of Blue Beetle.

=== 22 ===
- Alice Chancellor, 72, American electronics engineer.
- T. R. Fyvel, 77-78, British writer.
- David B. Goodstein, 53, American magazine publisher (The Advocate) and LGBT rights activist, colorectal cancer.
- Patricia Ward Hales, 56, British tennis player.
- Seniha Nafız Hızal, 87-88, Turkish politician.
- Walter Stauffer McIlhenny, 74, American businessman (Tabasco) and general, stroke.
- Lee W. Minton, 73, American labor unionist.
- Mohar Singh Rathore, 59, Indian politician, MP (since 1984).
- Herman Sokol, 68, American chemist.
- Piero Tellini, 68, Italian filmmaker.
- Kathryn Slaughter Wittichen, 89, American clubwoman.
- Günter Wyszecki, 59, German-Canadian physicist and color scientist.

=== 23 ===
- Alf Anderson, 71, American baseball player.
- Robert Bolgar, 72, English classical scholar.
- Bob Coolbaugh, 45, American football player.
- Fred Edmunds, 84, Australian politician.
- Cecil Isbell, 69, American football player and coach.
- David Stanley Jacubanis, 74, Russian-born American bank robber.
- Walter Kotschnig, 84, Austrian-American diplomat.
- René Lécuron, 76, French Olympic runner (1936).
- P. K. Le Roux, 80, South African politician.
- Joe Lintzenich, 77, American football player.
- Leonid Rumyantsev, 69, Soviet footballer.
- Hubert Schulze-Pellengahr, 85, German politician.
- Notable people killed in the bombing of Air India Flight 182:
  - Yelavarthy Nayudamma, 62, Indian chemical engineer and scientist.
  - Inder Thakur, 35, Indian actor, fashion designer and model.

=== 24 ===
- Ejnar Andersen, 73, Danish footballer.
- Charu Chandra Bhandari, 88, Indian lawyer, politician and independence activist.
- Gloria de Herrera, 56, American art collector and restorer, throat cancer.
- Valentine Dyall, 77, English actor and radio personality (Appointment with Fear).
- Eugene M. Emme, 65, American aviation historian, cancer.
- Walter Goldwater, 77, American bookseller, publisher and chess player.
- Thomas Hagen, 65, New Caledonian politician.
- Hans Mariacher, 74, Austrian Olympic ski jumper (1936).
- Kuninori Marumo, 93, Japanese naval admiral.
- Pete McArdle, 56, Irish-born American Olympic long-distance runner (1964).
- Rodolfo Nieto, 48, Mexican painter.
- John Sellars, 61, English footballer.

=== 25 ===
- Pee Wee Crayton, 70, American singer and guitarist ("Blues After Hours"), heart attack.
- William J. Driver, 67, American administrator, commissioner of the Social Security Administration (1980–1981), administrator of Veterans Affairs (1965–1969), kidney failure.
- Sten Forshufvud, 82, Swedish toxicologist.
- Morris Mason, 31, American convicted murderer and rapist, execution by electric chair.
- Raoul Naroll, 64, Canadian-born American anthropologist.
- Otto L. Nelson Jr., 82, American general.
- John R. Solomon, 75, Canadian politician.
- Albert Waters, 83, English cricketer.

=== 26 ===
- Anastasia Abramova, 83, Russian ballerina.
- Felix Dias Bandaranaike, 54, Sri Lankan politician, MP (1960–1977), cancer.
- Pat Curran, 76, New Zealand trade unionist and politician.
- Frank Dancewicz, 60, American football player.
- Sir Arthur fforde, 84, English civil servant.
- Tina Gray, 100, Scottish surgeon.
- Jaroslav Kožešník, 78, Czechoslovak mathematician.
- Torstein Kvamme, 92, Norwegian politician.
- Maurice Miles, 76-77, English conductor.
- John Phillips, 74, South African cricketer.
- Wes Schulmerich, 83, American baseball player.
- Sid Wileman, 75, English footballer.

=== 27 ===
- Declan Affley, 45, Australian folk singer and musician, aortic dissection.
- Bjørn Christophersen, 84, Norwegian historian.
- William D. Clark, 68, English public servant.
- James Craig, 73, American actor, lung cancer.
- Muhlis Erkmen, 93-94, Turkish politician.
- William Evans, Baron Energlyn, 72, Welsh geologist and life peer.
- Grete Hinterhofer, 85, Austrian pianist and composer.
- Yona Kesse, 77, Russian-born Israeli politician, MK (1949–1965).
- Eleanor La Mance, 86, American opera singer.
- Bill Langenberg, 81, Australian rugby player.
- Morris Mirkin, 66, American businessman (Budget Rent a Car), cancer.
- Konstantinos Mitsou, 75-76, Greek general, traffic collision.
- Patrick Joseph Morrissey, 49, Irish police officer, shot.
- Preston E. Peden, 70, American politician, member of the U.S. House of Representatives (1947–1949).
- John Pozzobon, 80, Brazilian Roman Catholic prelate and activist (Pilgrim Mother Campaign), traffic collision.
- Kovkab Safaraliyeva, 78, Soviet Azerbaijani pianist.
- Élias Sarkis, 60, Lebanese politician, president (1976–1982), cancer.
- South African anti-Apartheid activists murdered this day:
  - Fort Calata, 28.
  - Matthew Goniwe, 38.
  - Sicelo Mhlauli, 36.
  - Sparrow Mkhonto, 33.

=== 28 ===
- Howard Wright Alexander, 74, Canadian-American mathematician.
- Boris Blai, 91, Ukrainian-born American sculptor and academic administrator.
- Denis Martin Cowley, 66, British barrister.
- Lambros Konstantaras, 72, Greek actor.
- John H. Leims, 64, American soldier, Medal of Honor recipient.
- Kalle Matilainen, 85, Finnish Olympic runner (1928).
- Máire Ní Scolaí, 76, Irish singer.
- Herb Schumm, 42, Canadian football player.
- Mischa Spoliansky, 86, Russian-born British composer.
- Jimmy Thomson, 76, Scottish-born American golfer.
- Lynd Ward, 80, American artist and wordless novelist, complications from Alzheimer's disease.

=== 29 ===
- Jaroslav Dietl, 56, Czechoslovak screenwriter and playwright.
- Max Grässli, 83, Swiss diplomat.
- Mel Kenealy, 82, American racing driver.
- Andrzej Kijowski, 56, Polish essayist and screenwriter.
- Enrique Lantigua, 75, Dominican baseball player.
- Dora Maxwell, 87-88, American credit unionist.
- Orville Singer, 86, American baseball player.
- Frank E. Snodgrass, 65, American oceanographer.
- Walter Rudi Wand, 56, German judge.

=== 30 ===
- K. H. Ara, 71, Indian painter.
- James Dewar, 88, Canadian baker, inventor of the Twinkie.
- Mihai Flamaropol, 66, Romanian footballer, ice hockey player and ice hockey coach.
- Natalie Hays Hammond, 81, American artist.
- Robert Martin, 66, English cricketer.
- Sir Anthony Miers, 78, Scottish naval admiral.
- Max-Josef Pemsel, 88, German general.
- Milada Petříková-Pavlíková, 89, Czechoslovak architect.
- John Nyathi Pokela, 62, South African political activist.
- Haruo Remeliik, 54, Palauan politician, president (since 1981), shot.
- Swami Rudrananda, 84, Indian-Fijian Hindu monk.
- Edward Slaughter, 82, American football player and coach.
- Carl-Erik Stockenberg, 60, Swedish handball player.
- Clarence D. Tuska, 88, American radio engineer.
- Patricia Walker-Shaw, 45, American insurance executive.
