= Birgit Finnilä =

Swedish opera singer

Birgit Finnilä (born 20 January 1931) is a Swedish contralto opera singer.

== Life ==
Finnilä was born in Sibbarp, Sweden into a musical family. She studied at the Royal Academy of Music in London. She made her operatic debut in Gothenburg in 1967. Though principally singing concert works, her operatic roles include parts in Britten's The Rape of Lucretia, Gluck's Orfeo ed Euridice, Handel's Flavio, Mozart's Le nozze di Figaro, and Wagner's Ring cycle.

== Recordings ==
- Baroque and Romantic Vocal Music BIS-CD-127, singing Sea Pictures by Edward Elgar
- Dvorák/Fernström Big Ben 571-006 4 (861-006 2), singing Biblical Songs, Op. 99, by Antonín Dvořák
- Vivaldi Juditha Triumphans cond. Vittorio Negri (Philips)
- Mahler Das Lied von der Erde cond. Kurt Sanderling
- J. S. Bach The St. Matthew Passion cond. Michel Corboz (Erato)
- J. S. Bach The St. John Passion cond. Michel Corboz (Erato)
- J. S. Bach Mass in B minor cond. Michel Corboz (Erato)
