= Sibbarp =

Sibbarp can refer to:

- Sibbarp, Malmö, a neighbourhood of Malmö, Sweden
- Sibbarp, Varberg Municipality, a village in Varberg Municipality, Sweden
