= Saint Francis Red Wolves men's basketball =

Basketball team of Saint Francis University

- University: Saint Francis University
- Head coach: Luke McConnell (2nd season)
- Location: Loretto, Pennsylvania
- Arena: DeGol Arena (capacity: 3,500)
- Conference: Presidents' Athletic Conference
- Nickname: Red Wolves
- Colors: Red and white

NCAA Division I tournament appearances
- 1991, 2025

Conference tournament champions
- NEC: 1991, 2025

Conference regular-season champions
- NEC: 1991, 2019

The Saint Francis Red Wolves men's basketball team represents Saint Francis University (SFU) in Loretto, Pennsylvania. The team competes in the NCAA Division III Presidents' Athletic Conference (PAC), plays its home games at DeGol Arena, and is coached by Luke McConnell. Saint Francis made two appearances in the NCAA Division I men's basketball tournament in 1991 and 2025.

The 2025–26 season marked the program's final season in NCAA Division I. In March 2025, Saint Francis announced that it would begin reclassifying to NCAA Division III in July 2025, joining the Presidents' Athletic Conference following the completion of the 2025–26 academic year.

The university's athletic teams were known as the Red Flash until June 3, 2026, when Saint Francis announced that they would be rebranded as the Red Wolves beginning with the 2026–27 athletic year, coinciding with the school's transition to Division III.

== Season-by-season results ==
Record table
Season	Coach	Overall	Conference	Standing	Postseason
Frances McCreesh (1918–1920)
1918–19	Frances McCreesh	9–3			
1919–20	Frances McCreesh	11–2			
Frances McCreesh:		20–5 (.800)			
John Loughran (1920–1924)
1920–21	John Loughran	14–2			
1921–22	John Loughran	13–7			
1922–23	John Loughran	12–6			
1923–24	John Loughran	12–5			
John Loughran:		51–20 (.718)			
Jim Mahon (1924–1925)
1924–25	Jim Mahon	20–13			
Jim Mahon:		20–13 (.606)			
Emmet Russell (1925–1926)
1925–26	Emmet Russell	21–9			
Emmet Russell:		21–9 (.700)			
Eugene Stringer (1926–1927)
1926–27	Eugene Stringer	6–9			
Eugene Stringer:		6–9 (.400)			
William Donahue (1927–1930)
1927–28	William Donahue	5–10			
1928–29	William Donahue	10–3			
1929–30	William Donahue	6–8			
William Donahue:		21–21 (.500)			
Eugene Stringer (1930–1932)
1930–31	Eugene Stringer	5–10			
1931–32	Eugene Stringer	7–7			
Eugene Stringer:		12–17 (.414)			
Inactive (1932–1938)
Francis Salony (1938–1942)
1938–39	Francis Salony	6–9			
1939–40	Francis Salony	9–8			
1940–41	Francis Salony	6–8			
1941–42	Francis Salony	4–8			
Francis Salony:		25–33 (.431)			
Terrence Burns (1942–1943)
1942–43	Terrence Burns	1–2–1			
Terrence Burns:		1–2–1 (.375)			
Inactive (1943–1945)
William Hughes (1945–1955)
1945–46	William Hughes/Max Cook	1–8–1			
1946–47	William Hughes	11–8			
1947–48	William Hughes	15–9			
1948–49	William Hughes	16–11			NCIT First Round
1949–50	William Hughes	18–9			NCIT Quarter–finals
1950–51	William Hughes	19–4			NCIT Quarter–finals
1951–52	William Hughes	23–7			NCIT Runner–up
1952–53	William Hughes	13–5			
1953–54	William Hughes	21–6			NIT Quarterfinals
1954–55	William Hughes	21–9			NIT Semifinals
William Hughes (Division I Independent) (1955–1966)
1955–56	William Hughes	10–14			
1956–57	William Hughes	12–12			
1957–58	William Hughes	20–5			NIT First Round
1958–59	William Hughes	20–5			
1959–60	William Hughes	14–9			
1960–61	William Hughes	6–19			
1961–62	William Hughes	14–8			
1962–63	William Hughes	10–12			
1963–64	William Hughes	10–14			
1964–65	William Hughes	11–14			
1965–66	William Hughes	8–18			
William Hughes:		293–206–1 (.587)			
John Clark (Division I Independent) (1966–1969)
1966–67	John Clark	20–6			
1967–68	John Clark	19–6			
1968–69	John Clark	16–8			
John Clark:		55–20 (.733)			
John Hiller (Division I Independent) (1969–1971)
1969–70	John Hiller	13–12			
1970–71	John Hiller	15–10			
John Hiller:		28–22 (.560)			
Dick Conover (Division I Independent) (1971–1973)
1971–72	Dick Conover	12–13			
1972–73	Dick Conover	5–21			
Dick Conover:		17–34 (.333)			
Pete Lonergan (Division I Independent) (1973–1978)
1973–74	Pete Lonergan	15–11			
1974–75	Pete Lonergan	11–14			
1975–76	Pete Lonergan	14–14			
1976–77	Pete Lonergan	15–11			
1977–78	Pete Lonergan	15–11			
Pete Lonergan:		70–61 (.534)			
Dave Magarity (Division I Independent) (1978–1981)
1978–79	Dave Magarity	13–13			
1979–80	Dave Magarity	12–16			
1980–81	Dave Magarity	17–10			
Dave Magarity (ECAC Metro Conference) (1981–1983)
1981–82	Dave Magarity	6–20	3–11	5s	
1982–83	Dave Magarity	12–17	7–7	2s	
Dave Magarity:		60–76 (.441)	10–18 (.357)		
Kevin Porter (ECAC Metro Conference) (1983–1987)
1983–84	Kevin Porter	12–15	8–8	T–5th	
1984–85	Kevin Porter	9–19	6–8	5th	
1985–86	Kevin Porter	10–18	8–8	5th	
1986–87	Kevin Porter	11–16	7–9	T–5th	
Kevin Porter:		42–68 (.382)	29–33 (.468)		
Jim Baron (ECAC Metro Conference) (1987–1988)
1987–88	Jim Baron	7–20	4–12	8th	
Jim Baron (Northeast Conference) (1988–1992)
1988–89	Jim Baron	13–16	6–10	T–7th	
1989–90	Jim Baron	17–11	10–6	T–3rd	
1990–91	Jim Baron	24–8	13–3	T–1st	NCAA Division I First Round
1991–92	Jim Baron	13–16	5–11	8th	
Jim Baron:		74–71 (.510)	38–42 (.475)		
Tom McConnell (Northeast Conference) (1992–1999)
1992–93	Tom McConnell	9–18	7–11	T–7th	
1993–94	Tom McConnell	13–15	9–9	T–7th	
1994–95	Tom McConnell	12–16	7–11	8th	
1995–96	Tom McConnell	13–14	11–7	5th	
1996–97	Tom McConnell	12–15	9–9	6th	
1997–98	Tom McConnell	17–10	10–6	T–3rd	
1998–99	Tom McConnell	9–17	7–13	T–8th	
Tom McConnell:		85–105 (.447)	60–66 (.476)		
Bobby Jones (Northeast Conference) (1999–2008)
1999–00	Bobby Jones	10–18	7–11	T–7th	
2000–01	Bobby Jones	9–18	9–11	8th	
2001–02	Bobby Jones	6–21	5–15	T–9th	
2002–03	Bobby Jones	14–14	10–8	T–4th	
2003–04	Bobby Jones	13–15	10–8	T–4th	
2004–05	Bobby Jones	15–13	10–8	T–4th	
2005–06	Bobby Jones	4–24	2–16	11th	
2006–07	Bobby Jones	8–21	5–13	11th	
2007–08	Bobby Jones	6–23	4–14	T–8th	
Bobby Jones:		85–167 (.337)	62–104 (.373)		
Don Friday (Northeast Conference) (2008–2012)
2008–09	Don Friday	6–23	3–15	11th	
2009–10	Don Friday	11–19	9–9	T–6th	
2010–11	Don Friday	9–21	7–11	T–8th	
2011–12	Don Friday	6–23	5–13	10th	
Don Friday:		32–86 (.271)	24–48 (.333)		
Rob Krimmel (Northeast Conference) (2012–2025)
2012–13	Rob Krimmel	5–24	5–13	T–10th	
2013–14	Rob Krimmel	10–21	7–9	T–6th	
2014–15	Rob Krimmel	16–16	9–9	T–5th	CIT First Round
2015–16	Rob Krimmel	13–17	9–9	T–6th	
2016–17	Rob Krimmel	17–17	11–7	T–3rd	CIT Second Round
2017–18	Rob Krimmel	18–13	12–6	T–2nd	CIT First Round
2018–19	Rob Krimmel	18–15	12–6	T–1st	NIT First Round
2019–20	Rob Krimmel	22–10	13–5	T–2nd	
2020–21	Rob Krimmel	6–16	5–13	T–9th	
2021–22	Rob Krimmel	9–21	5–13	T–8th	
2022–23	Rob Krimmel	13–18	9–7	4th	
2023–24	Rob Krimmel	8–22	3–13	8th	
2024–25	Rob Krimmel	16–18	8–8	T–4th	NCAA Division I First Four
Rob Krimmel:		171–228 (.429)	108–118 (.478)		
Luke McConnell (Northeast Conference) (2025–2026)
2025–26	Luke McConnell	7–24	5–13	T–9th	
Luke McConnell:		7–24 (.226)	5–13 (.278)		
Total:					
National champion Postseason invitational champion Conference regular season champion Conference regular season and conference tournament champion Division regular season champion Division regular season and conference tournament champion Conference tournament champion

== Postseason results ==
=== NCAA Division I tournament results ===
The Red Flash appeared in the NCAA Division I tournament twice. Their record is 0–2.

Year	Seed	Round	Opponent	Result
1991	15	First Round	(2) Arizona	L 80–93
2025	16	First Four	(16) Alabama State	L 68–70

=== NIT results ===
The Red Flash appeared in the National Invitation Tournament (NIT) four times. Their combined record is 3–5.

Year	Round	Opponent	Result
1954	First Round; Quarterfinals	BYU; Duquesne	W 81–68; L 63–69
1955	First Round; Quarterfinals; Semifinals; 3rd Place Game	Seton Hall; Holy Cross; Dayton; Cincinnati	W 89–78; W 68–64; L 73–79; L 91–96
1958	First Round	Fordham	L 59–83
2019	First Round	Indiana	L 72–89

=== CIT results ===
The Red Flash appeared in the CollegeInsider.com Postseason Tournament (CIT) three times. Their combined record is 1–3.

Year	Round	Opponent	Result
2015	First Round	Bowling Green	L 64–67
2017	First Round; Second Round	Jacksonville; UMBC	W 78–76; L 79–87
2018	First Round	UIC	L 61–84

=== NCIT results ===
The Red Flash have appeared in the National Catholic Invitational Tournament four times. Their combined record is 3–4.

Year	Round	Opponent	Result
1949	First Round	Regis	L 49–66
1950	First Round	Loras	L 58–59
1951	First Round	Mount St. Mary's	L 74–84
1952	First Round; Quarterfinals; Semifinals; Championship Game	Loyola (MD); Saint Joseph's; Siena; Marquette	W 66–52; W 65–56; W 54–51; L 64–76

== Retired jerseys ==
Saint Francis has retired five jersey numbers.

Saint Francis Red Flash retired numbers
No.	Player	Pos.	Career
10	Kevin Porter	PG	1968–1972
12	Norm Van Lier	PG	1966–1969
26	Maurice Stokes	PF/C	1951–1955

== See also ==
- Saint Francis Red Flash women's basketball
