= Gärda Svensson =

Swedish politician (1895–1985)

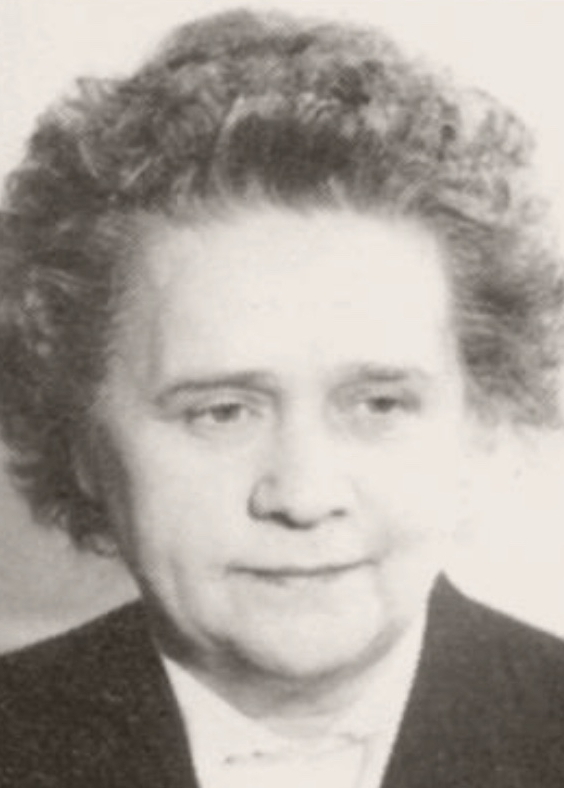
- Born: Gärda Svensson; 30 August 1895; Sibbarp, Halland County, Sweden
- Died: 15 June 1985 (aged 89); Ljungby, Halland County, Sweden
- Occupation: politician

Gärda Svensson (30 August 1895 – 15 June 1985) was a Swedish Bondeförbundet politician. She was a member of the Riksdag 1945–1963. She was the first female member of Bondeförbundet to hold such as position. She was also the head of the party's women section between 1933 and 1966.

Gärda Svensson was born to the farmer Sven Andersson, and married the farmer Daniel Svensson. Both her father and spouse was engaged in the Bondeförbundet, and she became active in the 1920s. She was one of the founding members of the party's women section, the Centerkvinnorna, which was founded in 1932.

== Sources ==
- Kommittén för kulturforskning i Vinbergs kommun (1971), En bok om Ljungby [A book of Ljungby] (in Swedish), Falkenberg: Hallands Nyheter AB
