= Hold (compartment) =

Parts of a ship

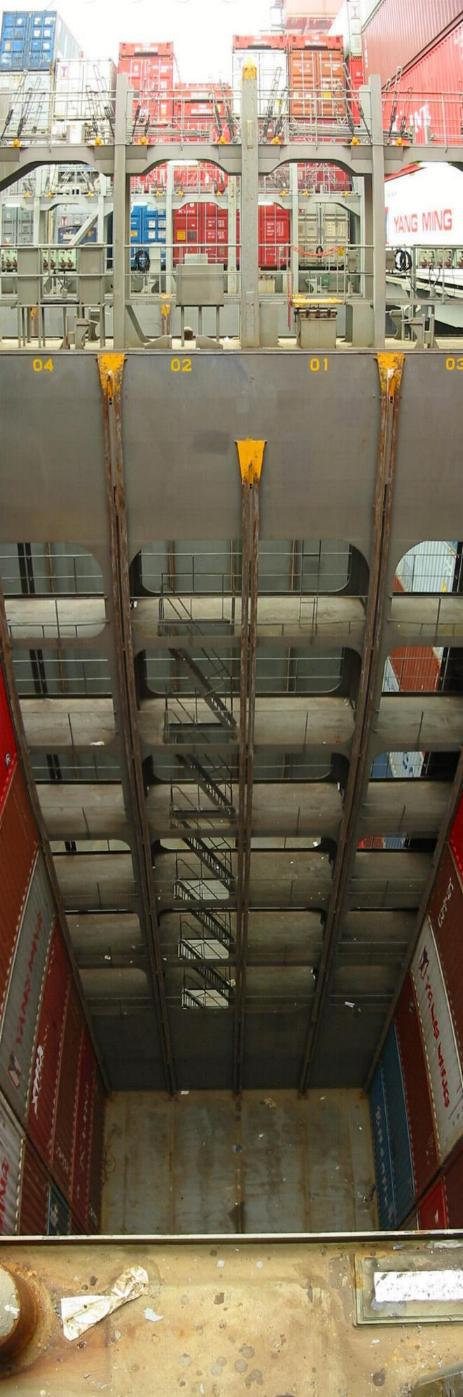
View of the hold of a container ship

A ship's hold or cargo hold is a space for carrying cargo in a ship or airplane compartment.

== Description ==
Cargo in holds may be either packaged in crates, bales, etc., or unpackaged (bulk cargo). Access to holds is by a large hatch at the top. Ships have had holds for centuries; an alternative way to carry cargo is in standardized shipping containers, which may be loaded into appropriate holds or carried on deck.

Holds in older ships were below the orlop deck, the lower part of the interior of a ship's hull, especially when considered as storage space, as for cargo. In later merchant vessels it extended up through the decks to the underside of the weather deck.

Some ships have built in cranes and can load and unload their own cargo. Other ships must have dock side cranes or gantry cranes to load and unload.

== Cargo hatch ==
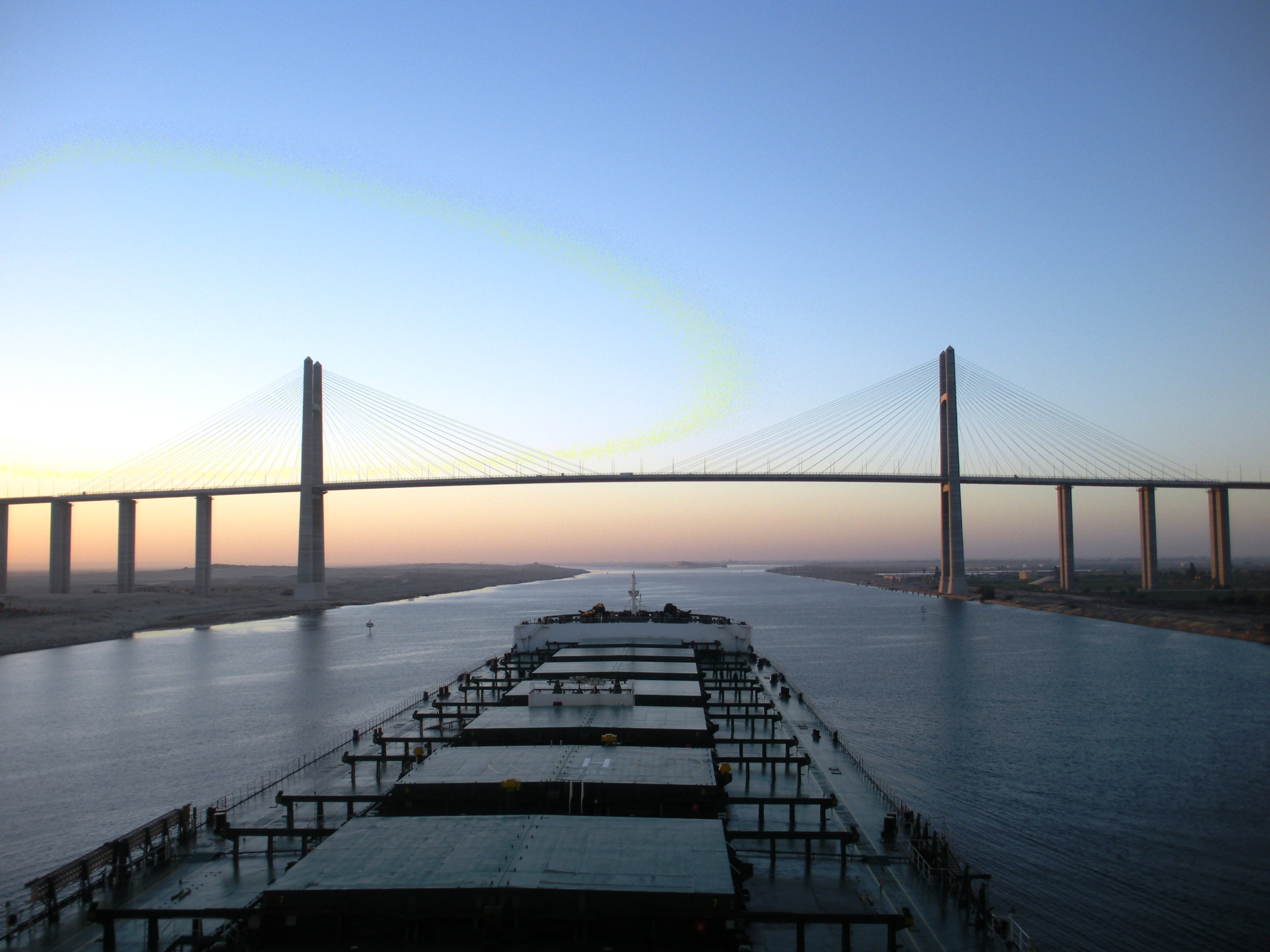
Six large cargo hatch covers on a capesize bulk carrier ship as she approaches the Egyptian-Japanese Friendship Bridge

A cargo hatch or deck hatch or hatchway is type of door used on ships and boats to cover the opening to the cargo hold or other lower part of the ship. To make the cargo hold waterproof, most cargo holds have cargo hatch. This can be a waterproof door, like a trap door with hinges or a cover that is placed on top of the cargo hold opening, covered and held down with a tarp or a latching system. Cargo hatch can also be flexible and roll up on to a pole. A small cargo hatch to a small storage locker is called a Lazarette. Should a cargo hatch fail in a storm, the ship is at risk of sinking, such that has happened on bulk carrier hatches. Some ships that sank due to cargo hatch failure: MV Derbyshire, MV Christinaki, Bark Marques, SS Henry Steinbrenner, SS El Faro, SS Marine Electric, and the SS Edmund Fitzgerald. Most cargo hatches have a coaming, a raised edge around the hatch, to help keep out water. The term batten down the hatches is used prepare the ship for bad weather. This may included securing cargo hatch covers with wooden battens, to prevent water from entering from any angle. The term cargo hatch can also be a used for any deck opening leading to the cargo holds. Aircraft and spacecraft may also use the term for their cargo doors.

Basic types:

- Lifting (up to remove)
- Rolling (rolls up on to a pole, trap type)
- Folding (fold up like paper or an accordion
- Sliding (slides on to the deck or over the side of ship)
- Roll stowing (roll up on to a pole, plates)

== Gallery ==
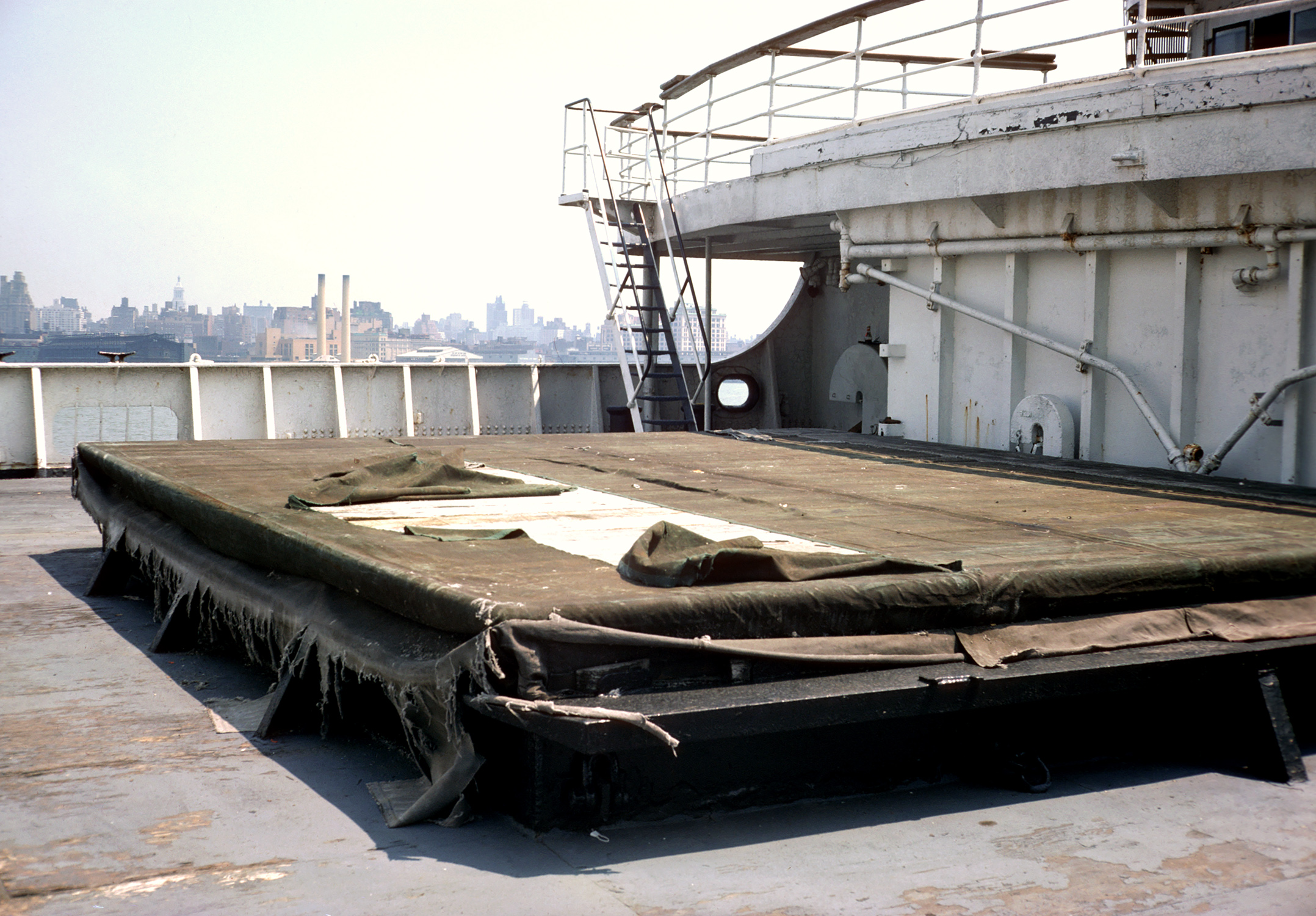
A weathered cargo hatch cover on the SS Stevens

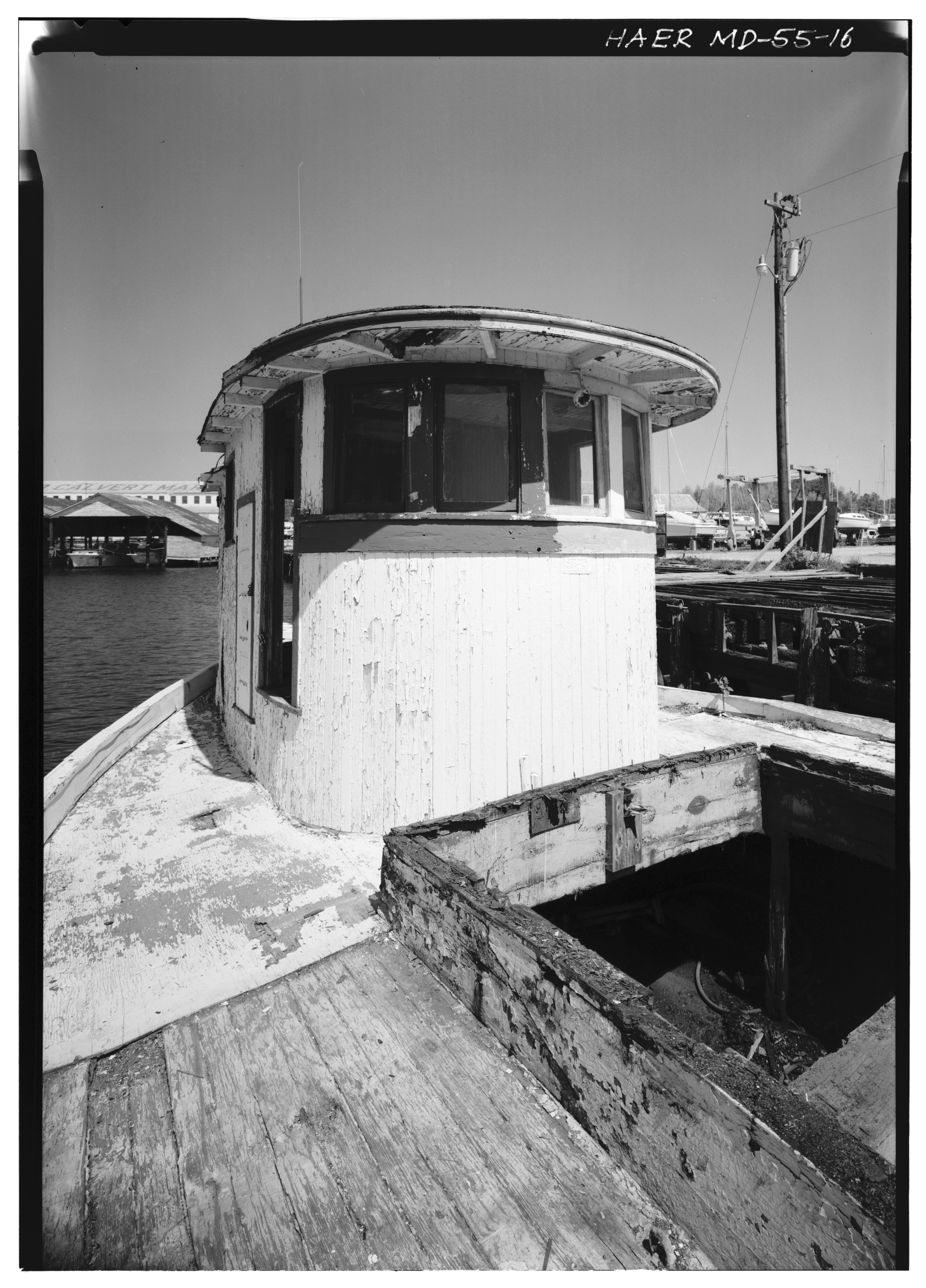
Cargo hatch coaming (bottom right) on a bugeye

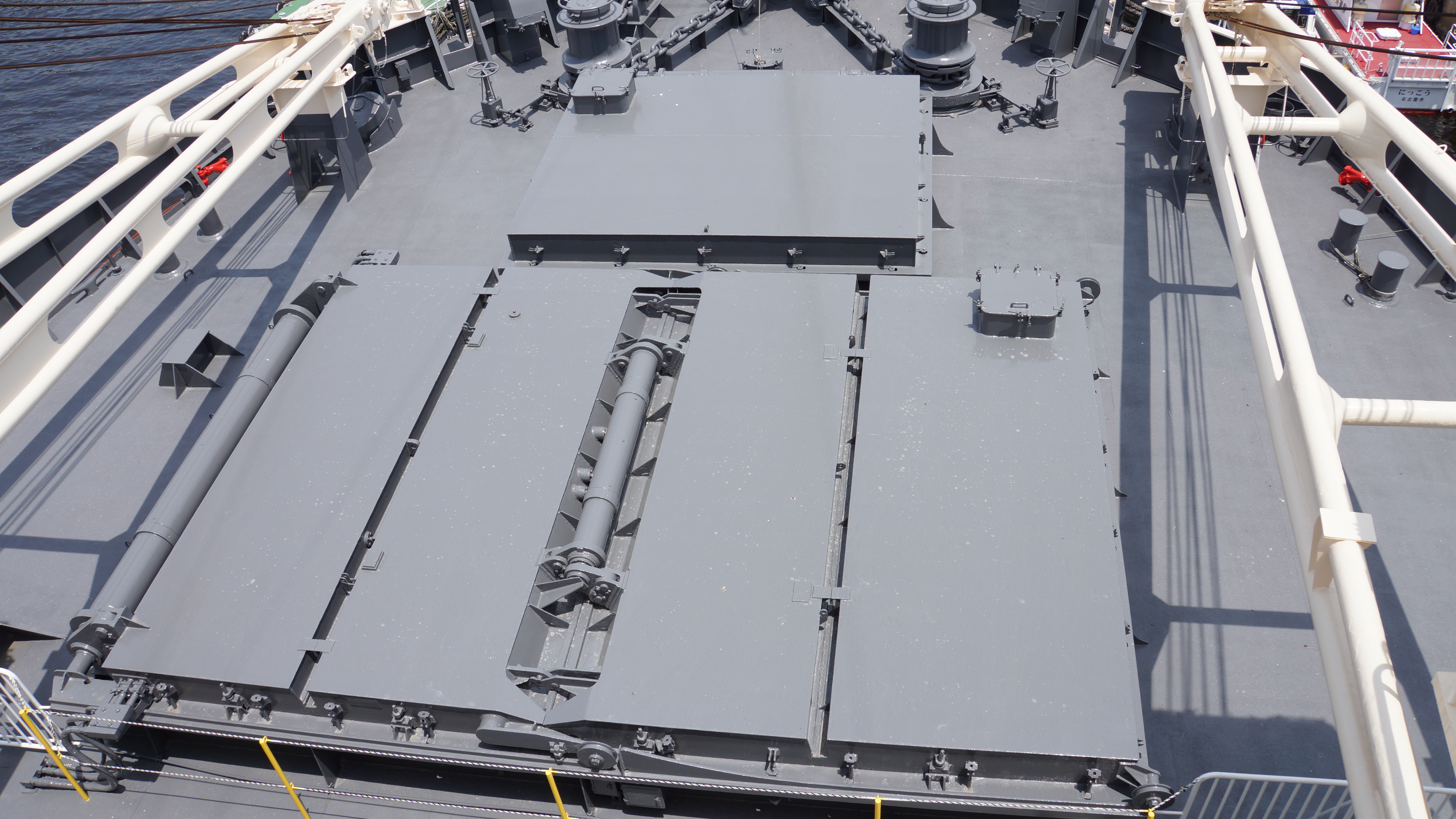
Cargo hatch of the ship Port of Nagoya

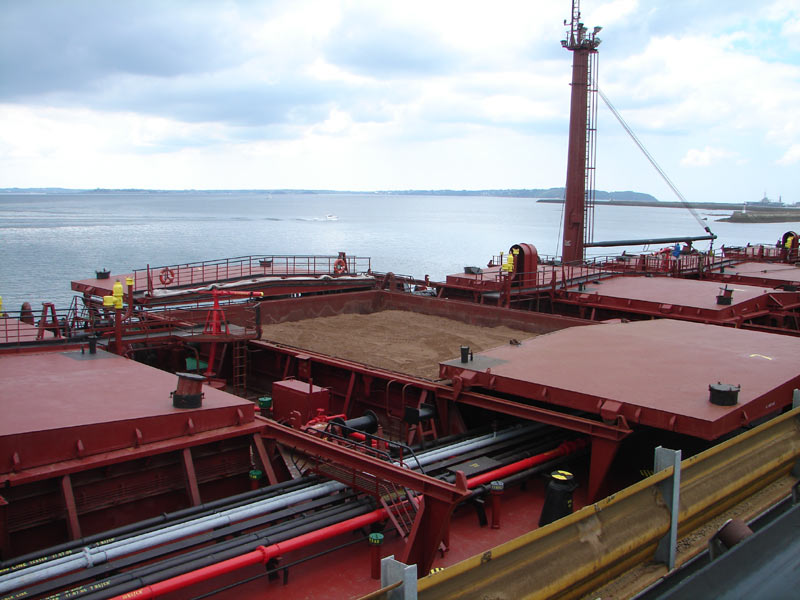
A sliding Cargo hatch cover on the OBO-carrier Maya

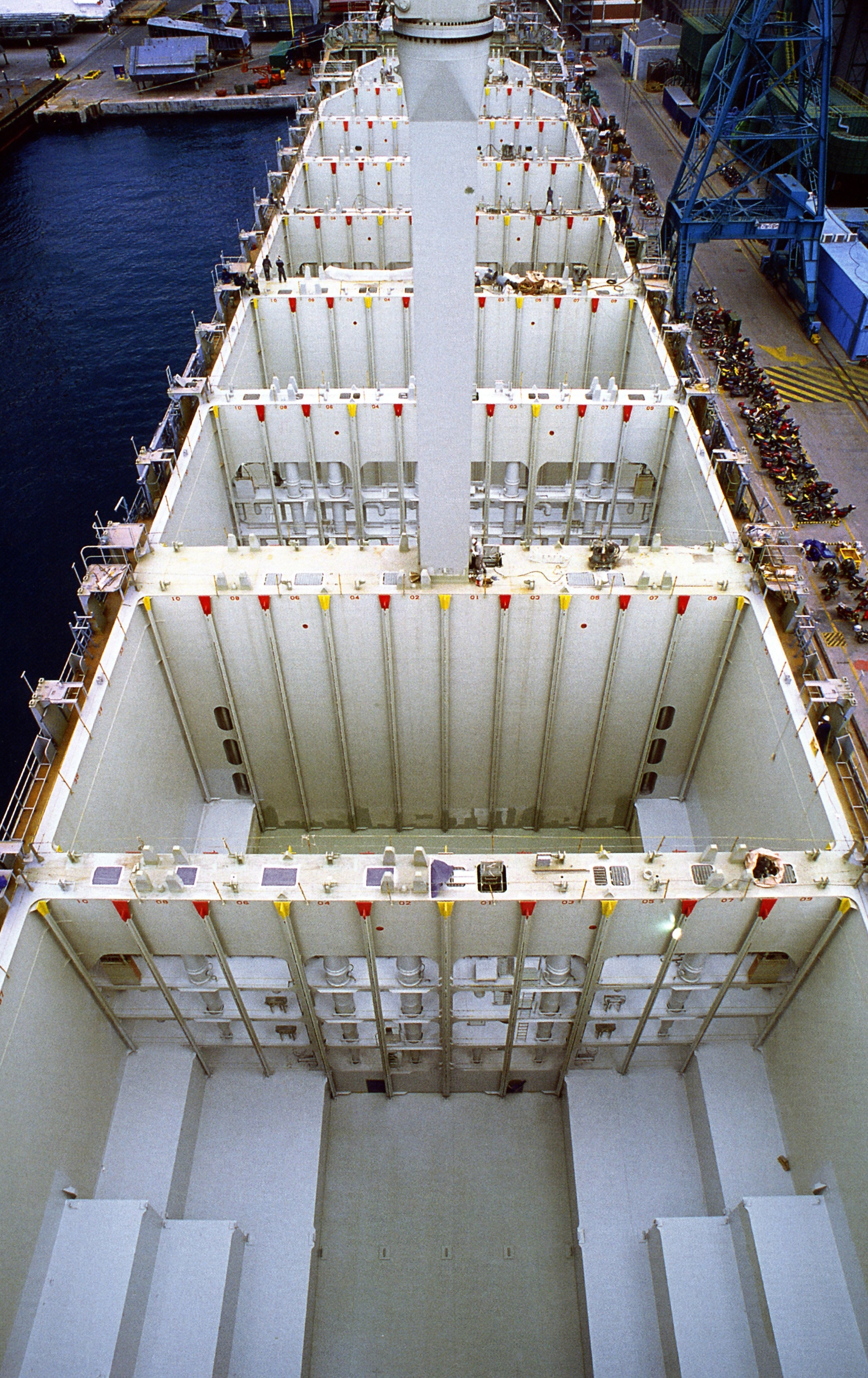
The cargo holds of a container ship

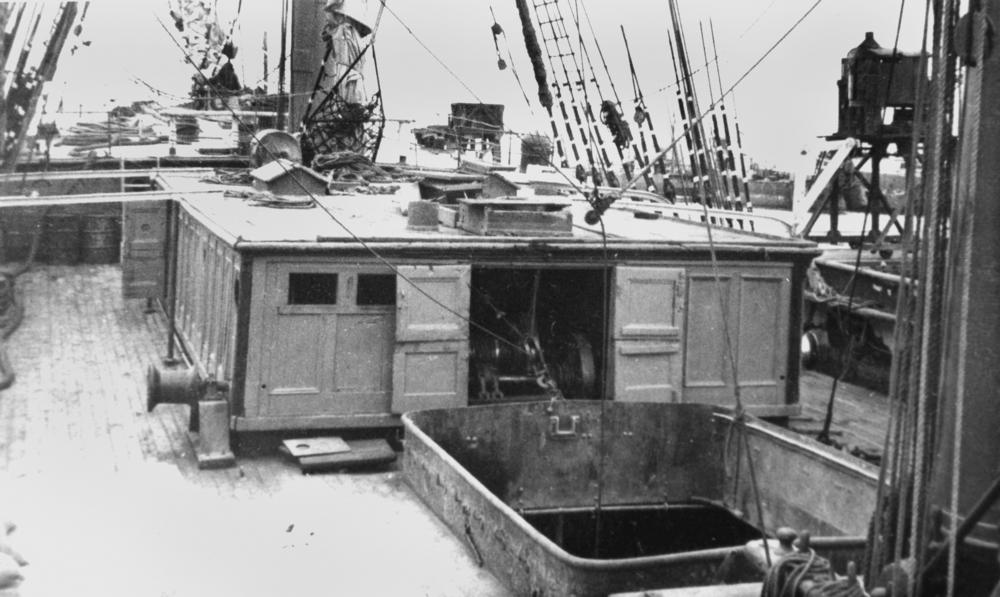
Deck hatch of the Omega, the last square-rigged sailing cargo ship

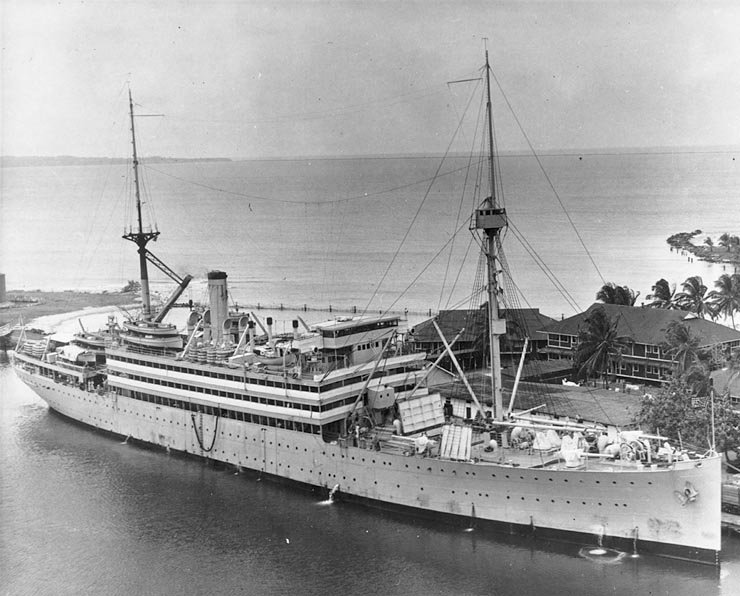
USS Henderson (AP-1) at Panama Canal in 1933. With two open cargo hatches forward of the bridge.

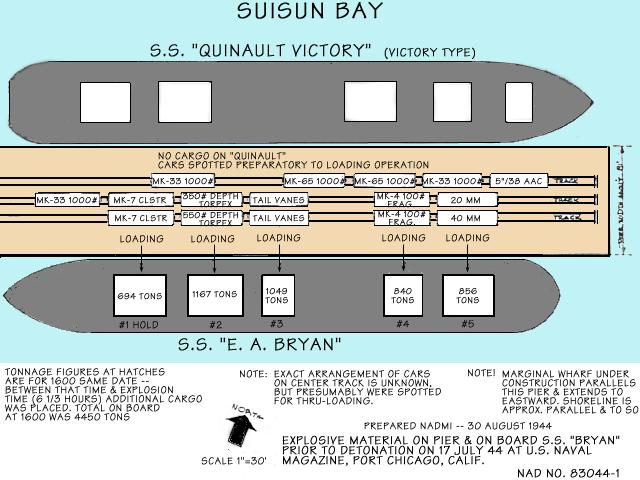
Layout from above of the five cargo holds of a Liberty ship and a Victory ship from Port Chicago disaster.

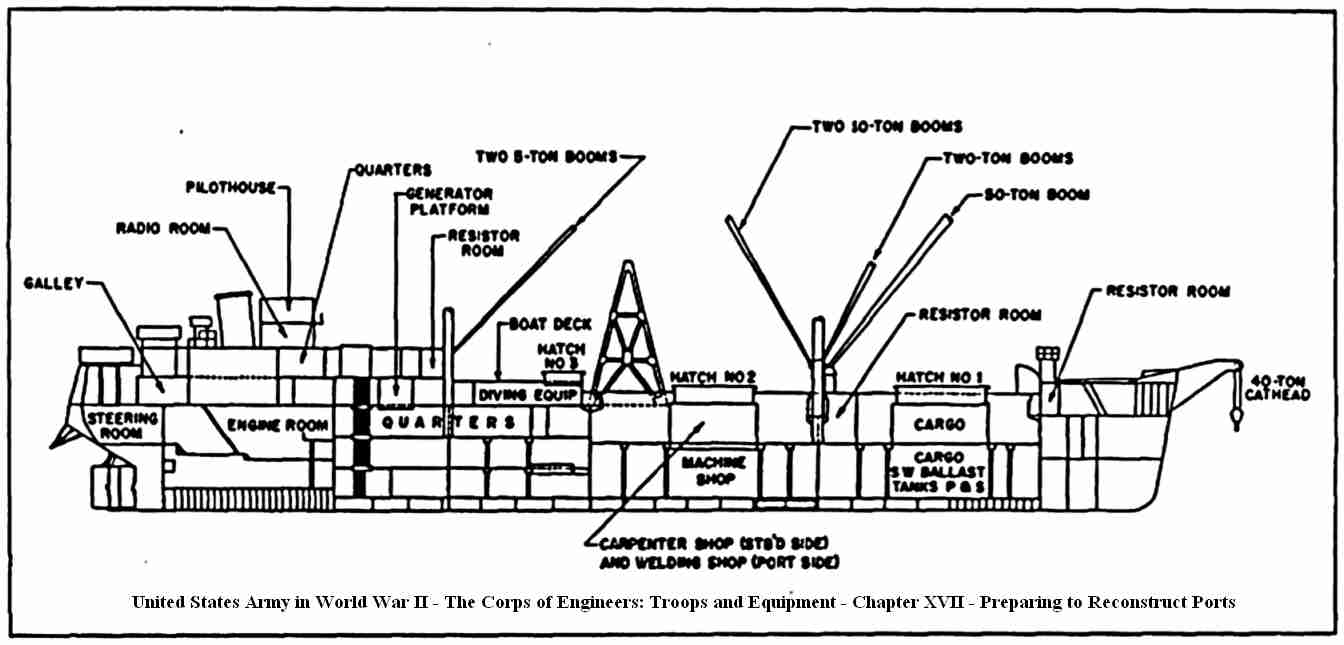
Holds of U.S. Army Engineer Port Repair ship

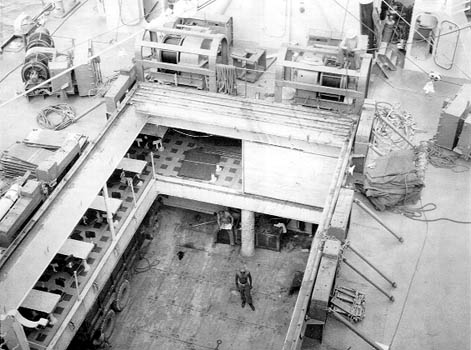
The cargo hold of USS Rankin (AKA-103) for combat loading

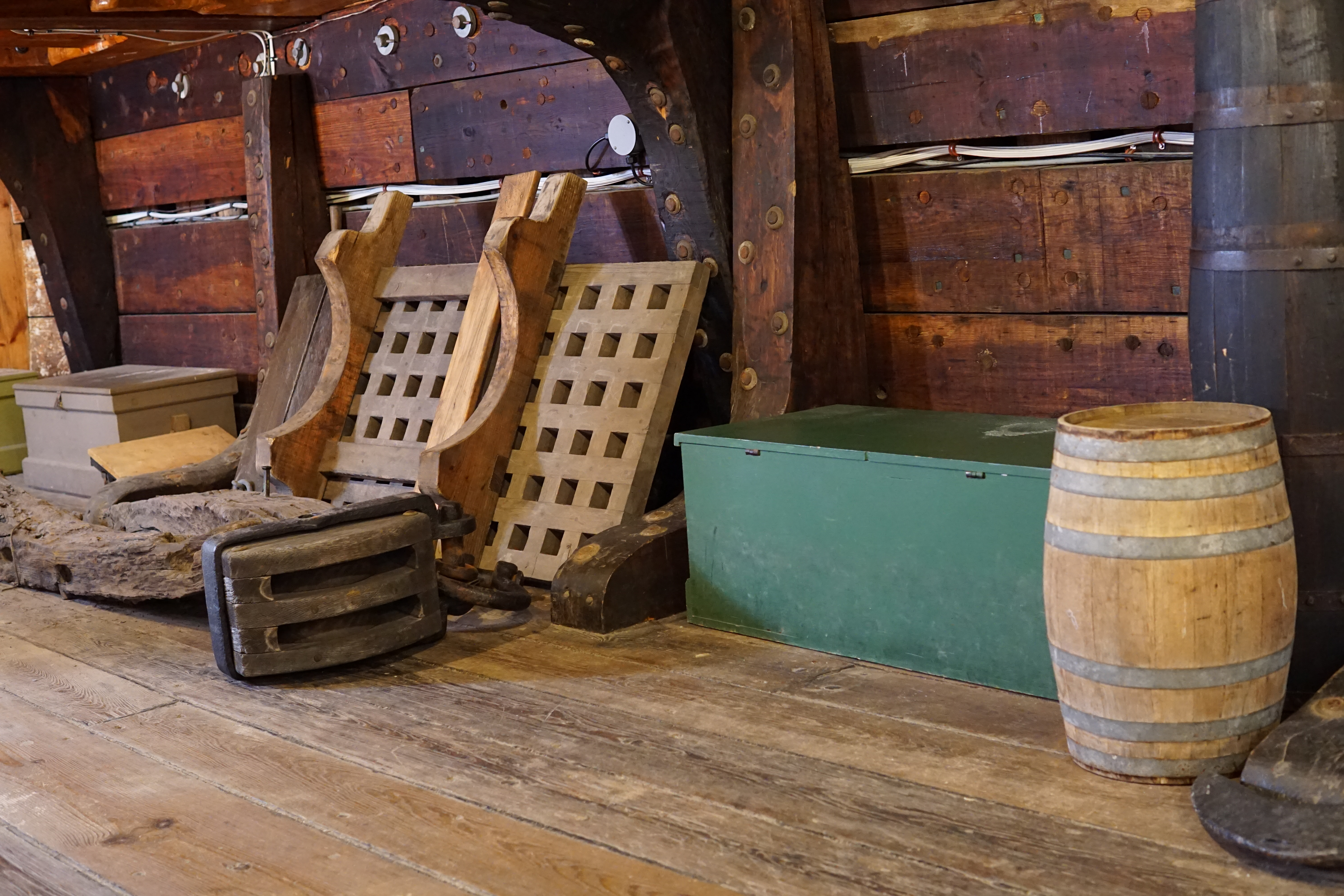
Wood cargo hold on the SS Charles W. Morgan at Mystic Seaport

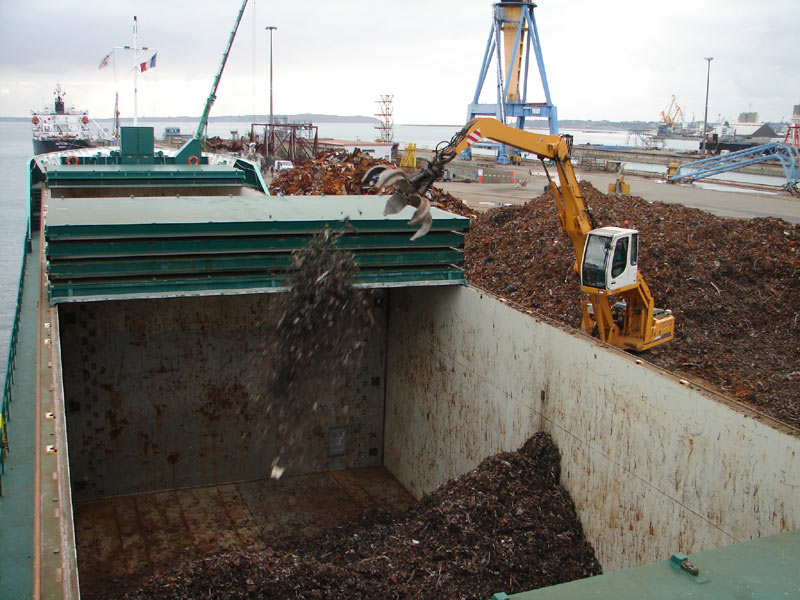
Loading scrap iron in to a cargo hold with sliding covers

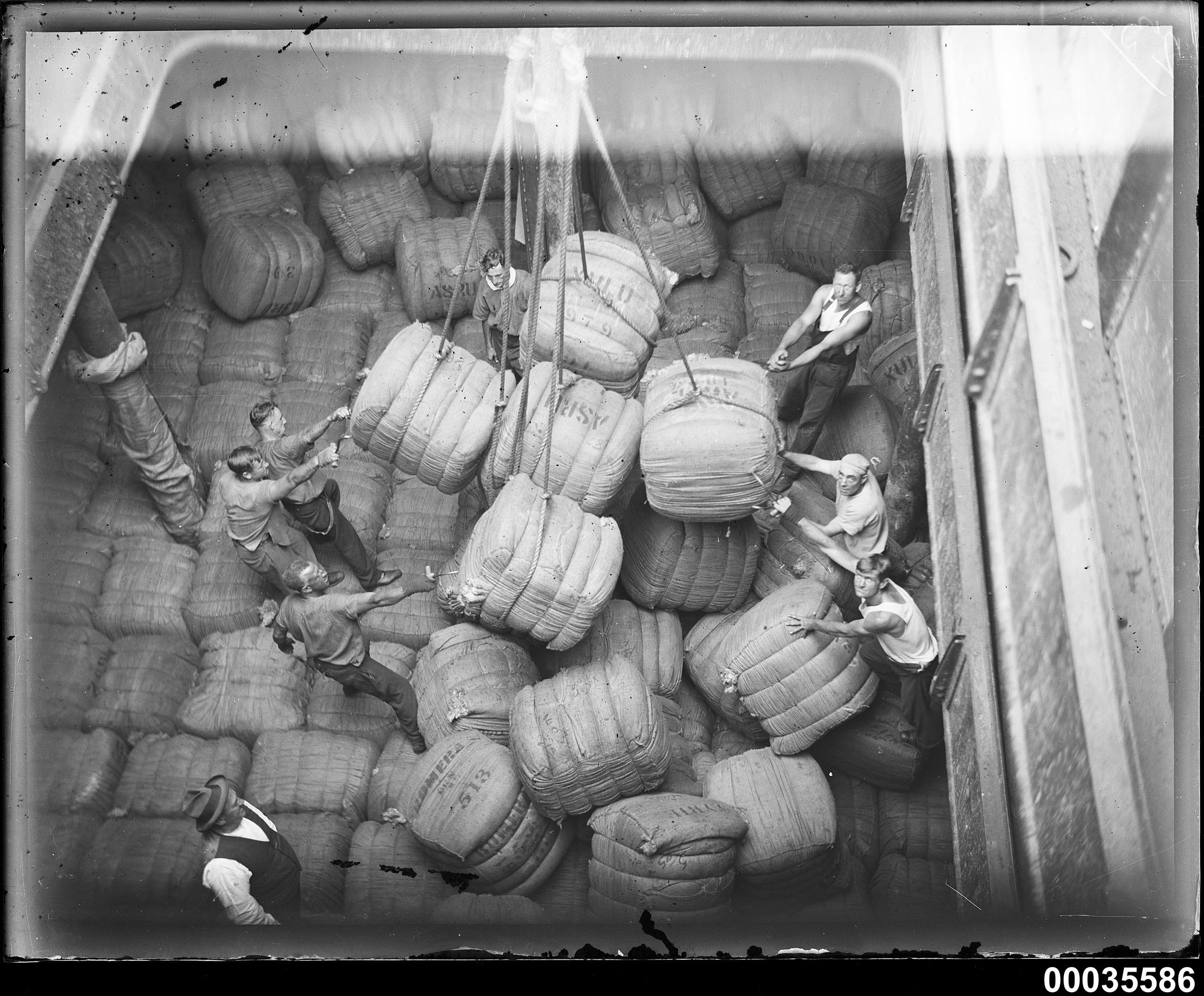
Positioning wool bales in a hold in 1933 into the Magdalene Vinnen (1921)

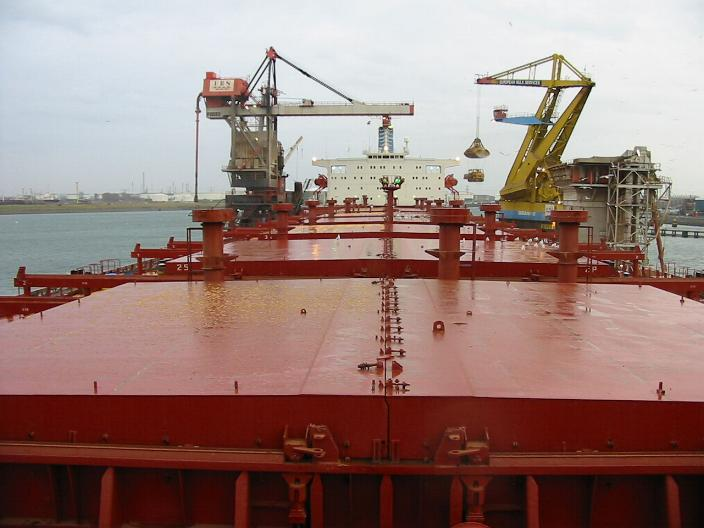
The sliding hatch covers of Zaira.

Bulk carrier hold midship cross section view

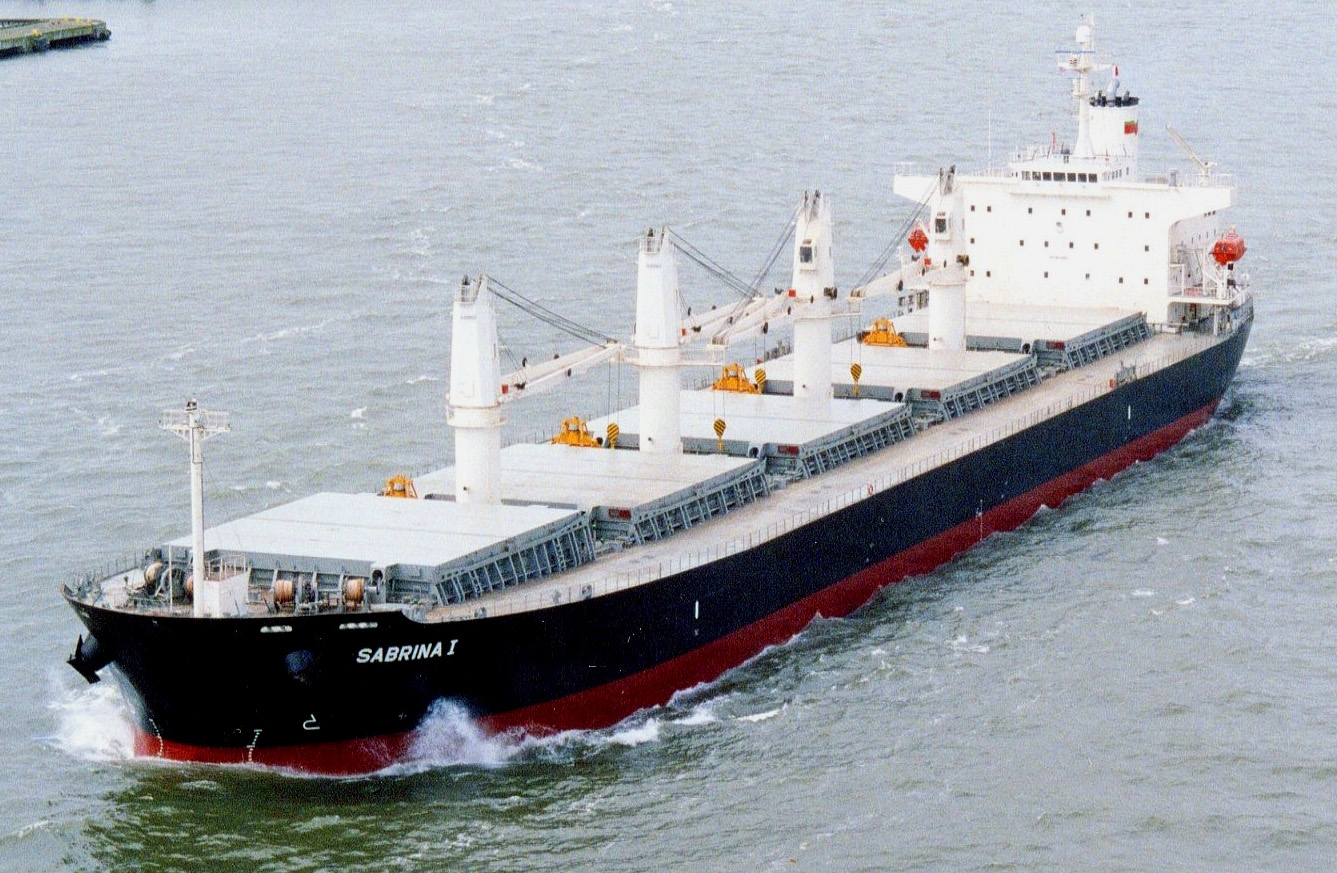
Sabrina I with five large holds

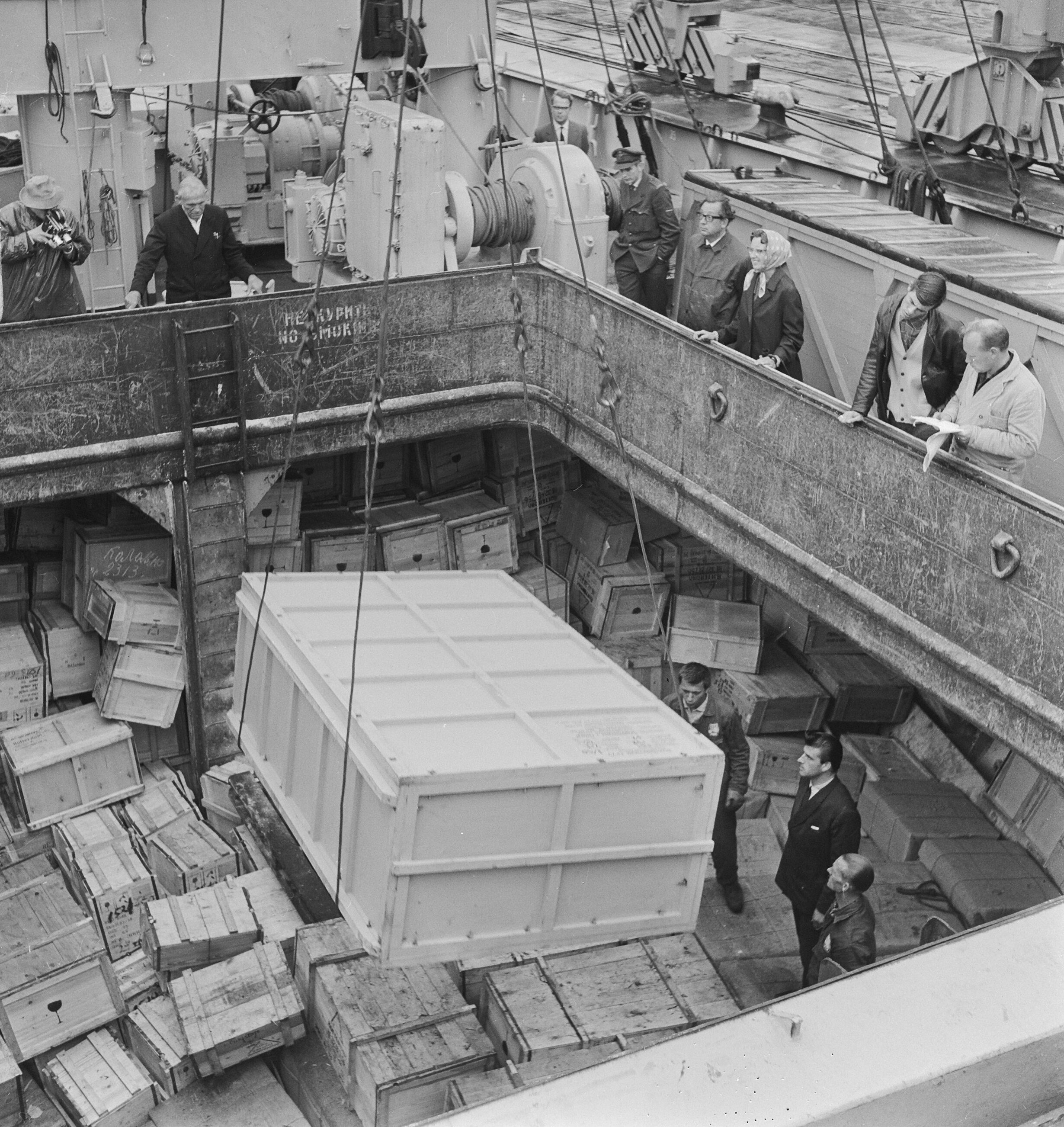
Cargo hold

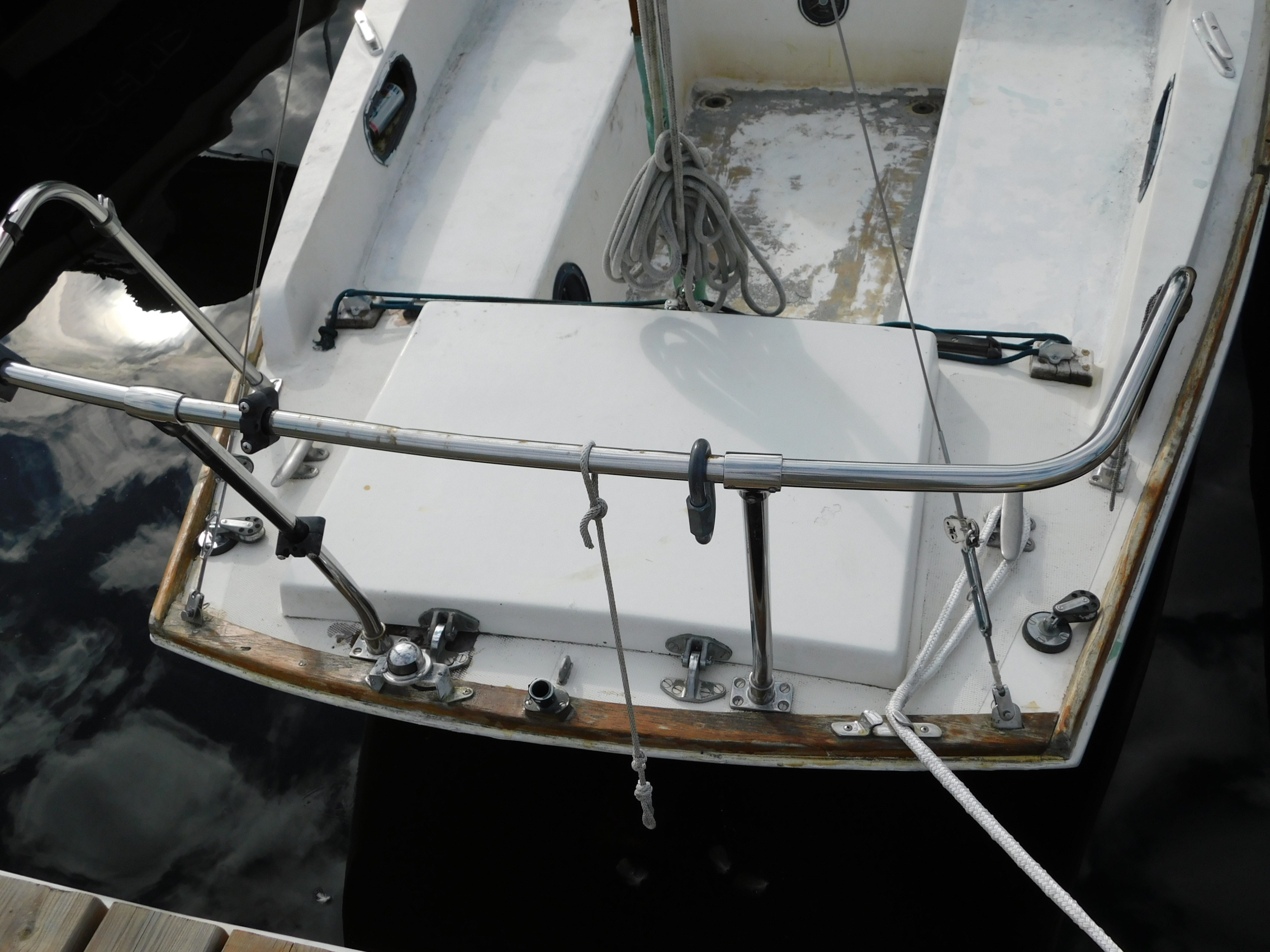
A lazarette with a white cargo hatch cover

== See also ==
- Plug door
- Cargo aircraft
- Edward Edgar Foden

Ships with holds:

- Container ship newer mode
- Liberty ship
- Thames sailing barge
- Type C1 ship
- Type C2 ship
- Type C3 ship
- Victory ship
