= Luke McConnell (basketball) =

American basketball coach

Current position
- Title: Head coach
- Team: Saint Francis
- Conference: Presidents' Athletic Conference
- Record: 7–28 (.200)

Biographical details
- Education: Saint Francis ('12)

Coaching career (HC unless noted)
- 2021–2024: Saint Francis (assistant)
- 2024–2025: Saint Francis (Associate head coach)
- 2025–present: Saint Francis

Administrative career (AD unless noted)
- 2013–2021: Saint Francis (DBO)

Head coaching record
- Overall: 7–28 (.200)

Luke McConnell is an American basketball coach. He is currently the head coach of the Saint Francis Red Wolves men's basketball team.

== Career ==
McConnell attended Saint Francis University, where he played college football. After graduating, he served as a graduate assistant for two years, before serving as the Director of Basketball Operations from 2013 through 2021. McConnell then served as an assistant coach for three years, before being promoted to associate head coach for the 2024–25 season.

On March 27, 2025, McConnell was named as head coach at Saint Francis, replacing Rob Krimmel.

== Head coaching record ==
Record table
Season	Team	Overall	Conference	Standing	Postseason
Saint Francis Red Flash (Northeast Conference) (2025–2026)
2025–26	Saint Francis	7–24	5–13	T–9th	
Saint Francis Red Wolves (Presidents' Athletic Conference) (2026–present)
2026–27	Saint Francis	0–4	0–0		
Saint Francis:		7–28 (.200)	5–13 (.278)		
Total:		7–28 (.200)			
National champion Postseason invitational champion Conference regular season champion Conference regular season and conference tournament champion Division regular season champion Division regular season and conference tournament champion Conference tournament champion

== Personal life ==
McConnell is the son of former Saint Francis head coach Tom McConnell. He is also the cousin of Indiana Pacers point guard T. J. McConnell.
