= Dave Wareham =

American basketball player

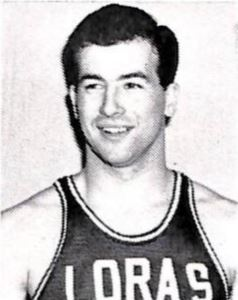
- Wareham as a senior at Loras

Personal information
- Born: June 28, 1924 St. Louis Missouri, U.S.
- Died: June 2, 1985 (aged 60) Denver, Colorado, U.S.
- Listed height: 6 ft 1 in (1.85 m)
- Listed weight: 185 lb (84 kg)

Career information
- High school: Loras Academy (Dubuque, Iowa)
- College: Loras (1943–1948)
- Position: Guard

Career history
- 1949: Waterloo Hawks

David Moran Wareham (June 28, 1924 – June 2, 1985) was an American professional basketball player. He played in the National Basketball League in four games for the Waterloo Hawks during the 1948–49 season and averaged 0.8 points per game.

Wareham was also an accomplished middle-distance runner for Loras College, running the 880 yards, mile run, and two miles.
