= Svend Frederiksen =

Danish footballer

Personal information
- Date of birth: 7 May 1916
- Date of death: 20 June 1985 (aged 69)

International career
Years	Team	Apps	(Gls)
1941	Denmark	2	(0)

Svend Frederiksen (7 May 1916 – 20 June 1985) was a Danish footballer. He played in two matches for the Denmark national football team in 1941.
