= Laurie Crouch =

Australian rules footballer, born 1918

Personal information
- Full name: Laurie Crouch
- Born: 29 January 1918
- Died: 15 June 1985 (aged 67)
- Original team: South Footscray
- Height: 179 cm (5 ft 10 in)
- Weight: 73 kg (161 lb)

Playing career^{1}
| Years | Club | Games (Goals) |
| 1945–46 | Fitzroy | 8 (4) |
- ^{1} Playing statistics correct to the end of 1946.

Laurie Crouch (29 January 1918 – 15 June 1985) was a former Australian rules footballer who played with Fitzroy in the Victorian Football League (VFL).
