= Milada Petříková-Pavlíková =

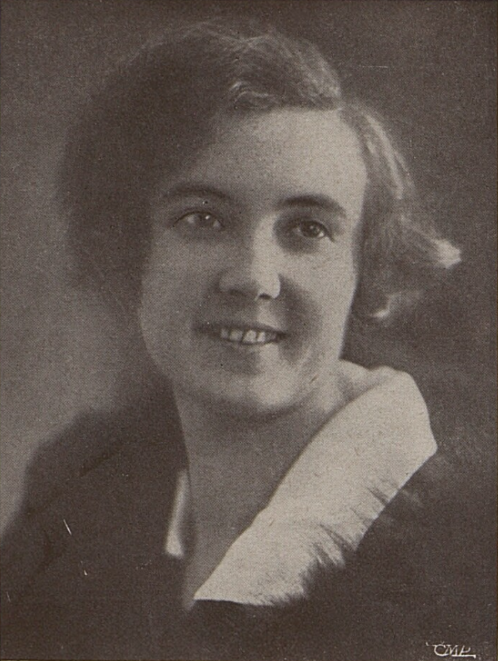
Milada Petříková-Pavlíková in 1927

Milada Petříková-Pavlíková (August 22, 1895 in Tábor – June 30, 1985) was a Czech architect.

She was born as Milada Pavlíková. Pavlíková graduated in 1921 as the first female architect in Czechoslovakia. She married her teacher, architect Theodor Petřík (*1882 Tábor-†1941 Praha) and used the name Milada Petříková-Pavlíková.

Petříková-Pavlíková designed, among others, what is today called The Drama Club in Prague, which was before World War II the seat of a women's organization.
