= Eugene Stringer =

American football player and sports coach (1903–1985)

Biographical details
- Born: May 29, 1903; Cleveland, Ohio, U.S.
- Died: June 1, 1985 (aged 82); Pueblo, Colorado, U.S.

Playing career

Football
- 1921–1924: John Carroll
- 1925: Cleveland Bulldogs
- Positions: Fullback, linebacker

Coaching career (HC unless noted)

Football
- 1926: Saint Francis (PA)
- 1930–1931: Saint Francis (PA)

Basketball
- 1926–1927: Saint Francis (PA)
- 1930–1932: Saint Francis (PA)

Eugene Charles Stringer (May 29, 1903 – June 1, 1985) was an American professional football player and a college football and college basketball coach. He played for one season for the Cleveland Bulldogs of the National Football League (NFL) in 1925. Stringer served as the head football coach (1926, 1930–1931) and head basketball coach (1926–1927, 1930–1932) at Saint Francis University in Loretto, Pennsylvania.
