= Hubert Schulze-Pellengahr =

German politician

Member of the Bundestag
- In office 7 September 1949 – 15 October 1961

Personal details
- Born: 15 August 1899
- Died: 23 June 1985 (aged 85)
- Party: CDU

Hubert Schulze-Pellengahr (German pronunciation: [ˈhuːbɛʁt ˌʃʊltsəˈpɛlənɡaːɐ̯]; August 15, 1899 – June 23, 1985) was a German politician of the Christian Democratic Union (CDU) and former member of the German Bundestag.

== Life ==
Until 1933, he was a member of the Centre Party, and he resisted attempts to recruit him for NSDAP. From 1949 to 1961 he was a member of the German Bundestag, where he represented the constituency of Lüdinghausen - Coesfeld as a directly elected member of parliament.

== Literature ==
Herbst, Ludolf; Jahn, Bruno (2002). Vierhaus, Rudolf (ed.). Biographisches Handbuch der Mitglieder des Deutschen Bundestages. 1949–2002 [Biographical Handbook of the Members of the German Bundestag. 1949–2002] (in German). München: De Gruyter - De Gruyter Saur. p. 1715. ISBN 978-3-11-184511-1.
