= Ejnar Andersen =

Danish footballer (1911–1985)

Personal information
- Full name: Ejnar Emanuel Andersen
- Date of birth: 10 November 1911
- Place of birth: Copenhagen, Denmark
- Date of death: 24 June 1985 (aged 73)
- Position: Defender

International career
Years	Team	Apps	(Gls)
1933–1937	Denmark	7	(0)

Ejnar Andersen (10 November 1911 – 24 June 1985) was a Danish footballer. He played in seven matches for the Denmark national football team from 1933 to 1937.
