= Michel Corboz =

Swiss conductor (1934–2021)

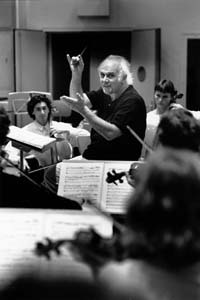
Corboz in 1990

Michel Corboz (14 February 1934 – 2 September 2021) was a Swiss conductor.

== Life ==
Corboz was born in Marsens, Switzerland, and educated in his native canton of Fribourg. He studied vocal performance and composition at the conservatory in Fribourg.

In 1953, he moved to Lausanne, where he became director of church music.

In 1961, he founded the Ensemble Vocal de Lausanne, with which he has recorded and toured extensively. He also had an association with the Gulbenkian Choir of Lisbon and taught at the Conservatoire de Musique de Genève.

Corboz died on 2 September 2021, aged 87.

== Awards ==
Corboz received the Prize of Critics in Argentina in 1995 and 1996. The French Republic honoured him with the title of Commandeur de l'Ordre des Arts et des Lettres. The Great Prize of the Town of Lausanne was awarded to him in 1990.

In December 1999, Corboz was decorated by the President of the Republic of Portugal with the Great Cross of the Order of Infante Dom Henrique.
