= Richard West (cricketer, born 1920) =

English cricketer (1920–1985)

Personal information
- Full name: Albert Richard West
- Born: 7 August 1920; Earl Shilton, Leicestershire, England
- Died: 8 June 1985 (aged 64); Earl Shilton, Leicestershire, England
- Batting: Left-handed
- Bowling: Slow left-arm orthodox

Domestic team information
- Years: Team
- 1939: Leicestershire

Career statistics
Competition	First-class
Matches	3
Runs scored	50
Batting average	10.00
100s/50s	0/0
Top score	22
Balls bowled	384
Wickets	2
Bowling average	102.50
5 wickets in innings	0
10 wickets in match	0
Best bowling	2/46
Catches/stumpings	1/–
- Source: Cricinfo, 29 February 2012

Albert Richard West (7 November 1920 – 8 June 1985) was an English cricketer. West was a left-handed batsman who bowled slow left-arm orthodox. He was born at Earl Shilton, Leicestershire.

West made his first-class debut for Leicestershire against Oxford University in 1939 at the University Parks. He made two further first-class appearances for Leicestershire in the 1939 County Championship, against Hampshire at the County Ground, Southampton, and Sussex at the Central Recreation Ground, Hastings. He scored 50 runs in his three first-class appearances, which came at an average of 10.00, with a high score of 22. With the ball, he took 2 wickets at an expensive bowling average of 102.50, with best figures of 2/46.

He died at the place of his birth on 8 June 1985.
