= Max Grässli =

Swiss diplomat (1902–1985)

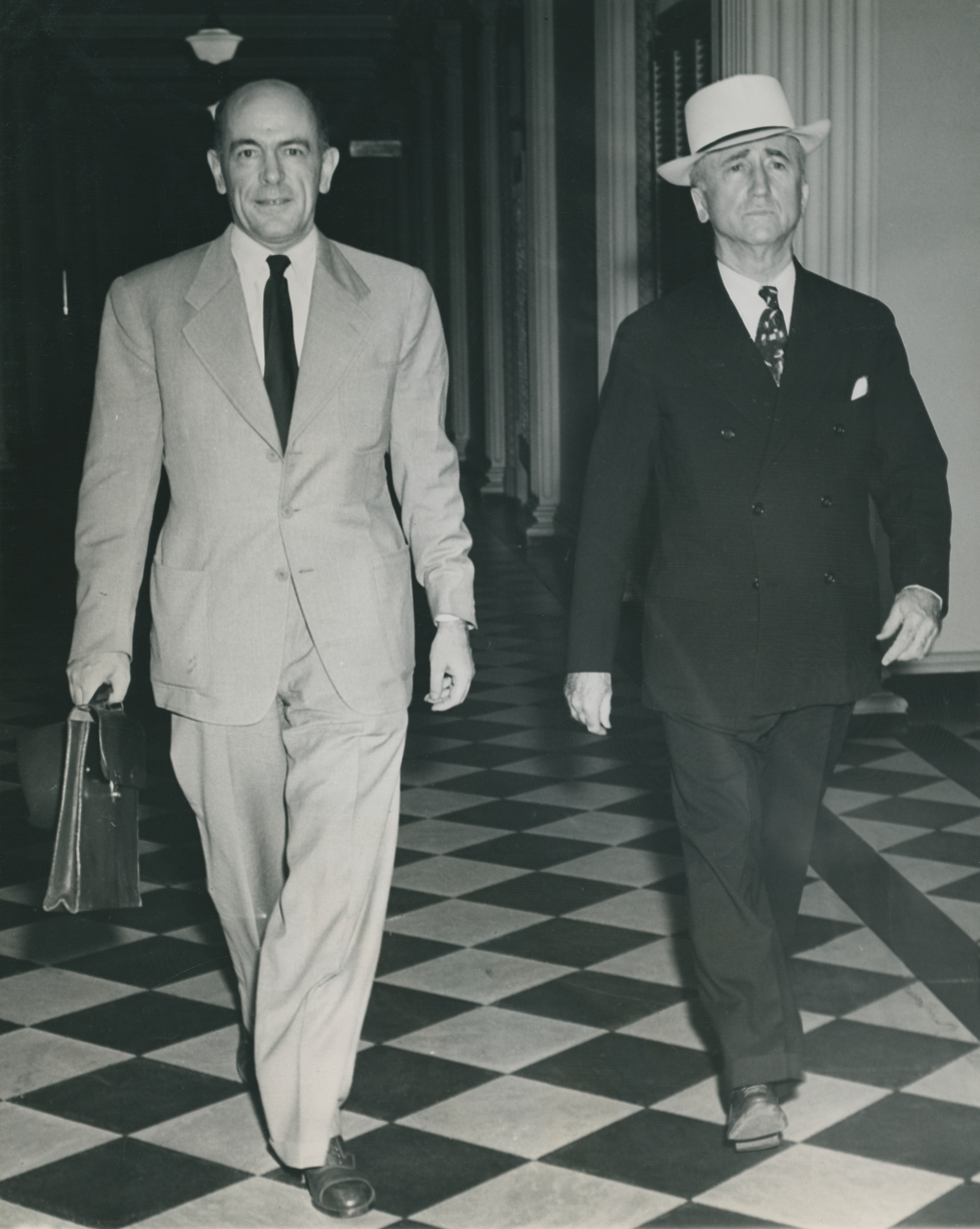
14 August 1945 – A historic walk: Max Grässli (left) walks through the United States Department Hall with the Secretary of State, James F. Byrnes, after delivering Japan's reply to the Allied Surrender Terms.

Max Grässli (4 March 1902 – 29 June 1985) was a Swiss diplomat.

== Early years ==
Max Grässli was born in Aarau, Switzerland. In 1930, he began working for the Swiss Federal Department of Foreign Affairs at the legation in Paris.

== World War II ==
During World War II, Max Grässli was the Chargé d'Affaires ad interim of Switzerland, a member of the Swiss legation in Washington DC. In that capacity, he passed official communiques back and forth between the warring governments of the United States and Japan, including the Japanese announcement of 10 August 1945 regarding acceptance of the Potsdam Declaration.

== Post-war years ==
After World War II, Max Grässli served in the Swiss diplomatic missions to Japan, the USSR, Hungary, India, Thailand and Sweden. In 1966, he prepared a report on behalf of the United Nations on the economic significance of the Panama Canal.
