= Paavo Miettinen =

Finnish fencer

Personal information
- Born: 20 May 1919 Viipuri, Finland
- Died: 8 June 1985 (aged 66) Hyvinkää, Finland

Sport
- Sport: Fencing

Paavo Miettinen (20 May 1919 – 8 June 1985) was a Finnish fencer. He competed in the team épée event at the 1952 Summer Olympics.
