= Arvīds Petersons =

Latvian ice hockey player

- Born: 24 October 1913 Riga, Governorate of Livonia, Russian Empire
- Died: 8 June 1985 (aged 71) Riga, Latvian SSR, Soviet Union
- Position: Left wing
- Played for: HK ASK Rīga; Rīgas US; Dinamo Riga
- National team: Latvia
- Playing career: 1932–1948

Arvīds Mārtiņš Petersons (24 October 1913 – 8 June 1985) was a Latvian sportsman. He was active in ice hockey, bandy, basketball and volleyball. He played ice hockey for HK ASK Rīga, Rīgas US, and Dinamo Riga during his career. Petersons also played for the Latvian national team at the 1936 Winter Olympics and three World Championships.

He also took part in two International University Games. In 1937 as part of the Latvian national basketball team and in 1939 as part of the Latvian national volleyball team.
