= Otto L. Nelson Jr. =

United States Army general

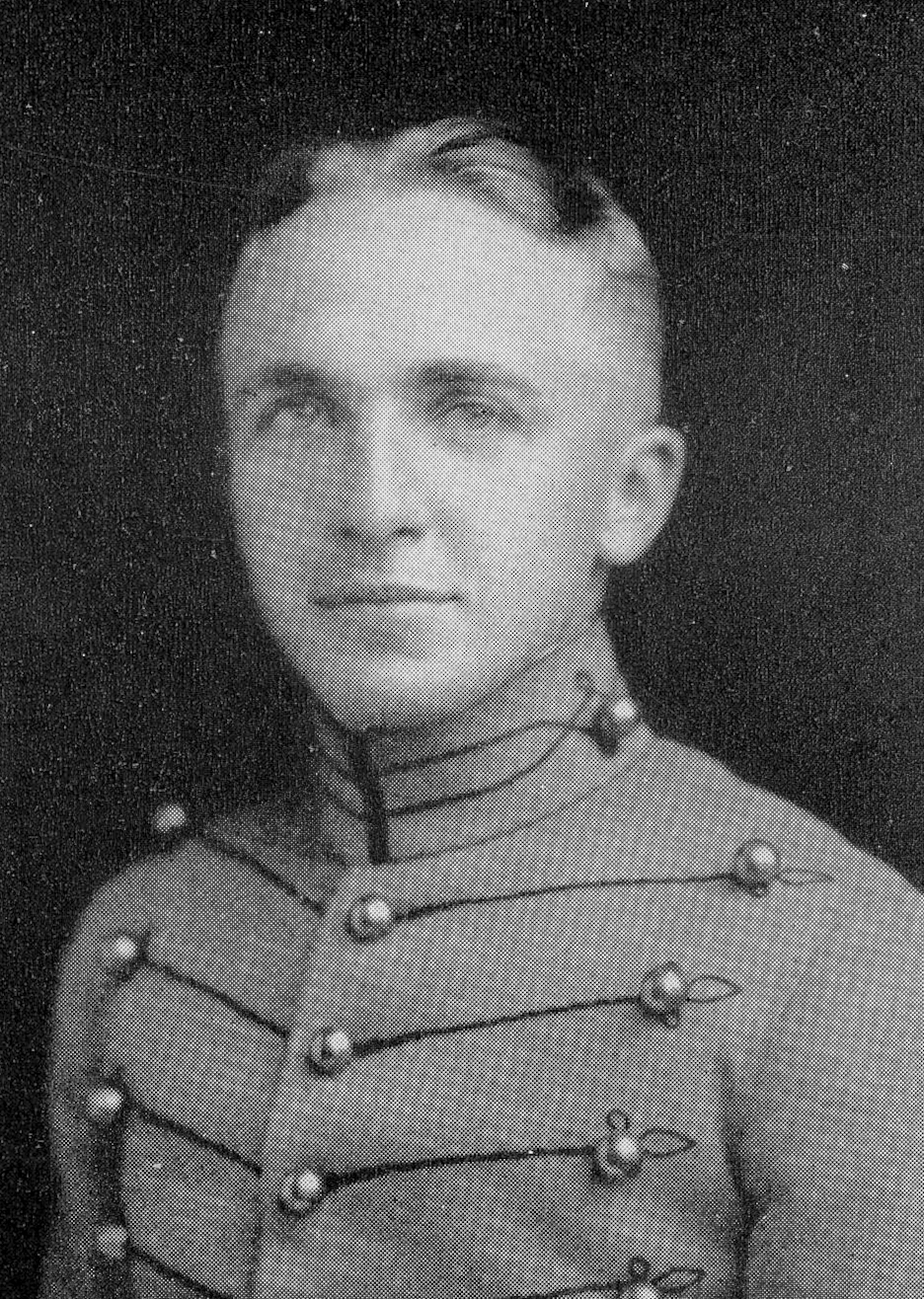
- At West Point in 1924
- Born: Otto Lauren Nelson Jr. November 2, 1902; Omaha, Nebraska
- Died: June 25, 1985 (aged 82); New Rochelle, New York
- Burial place: Arlington National Cemetery
- Education: United States Military Academy; Columbia University; Harvard University
- Occupations: Military officer, insurance executive

Otto Lauren Nelson Jr. (November 2, 1902 – June 25, 1985) was an officer in the United States Army.

== Biography ==
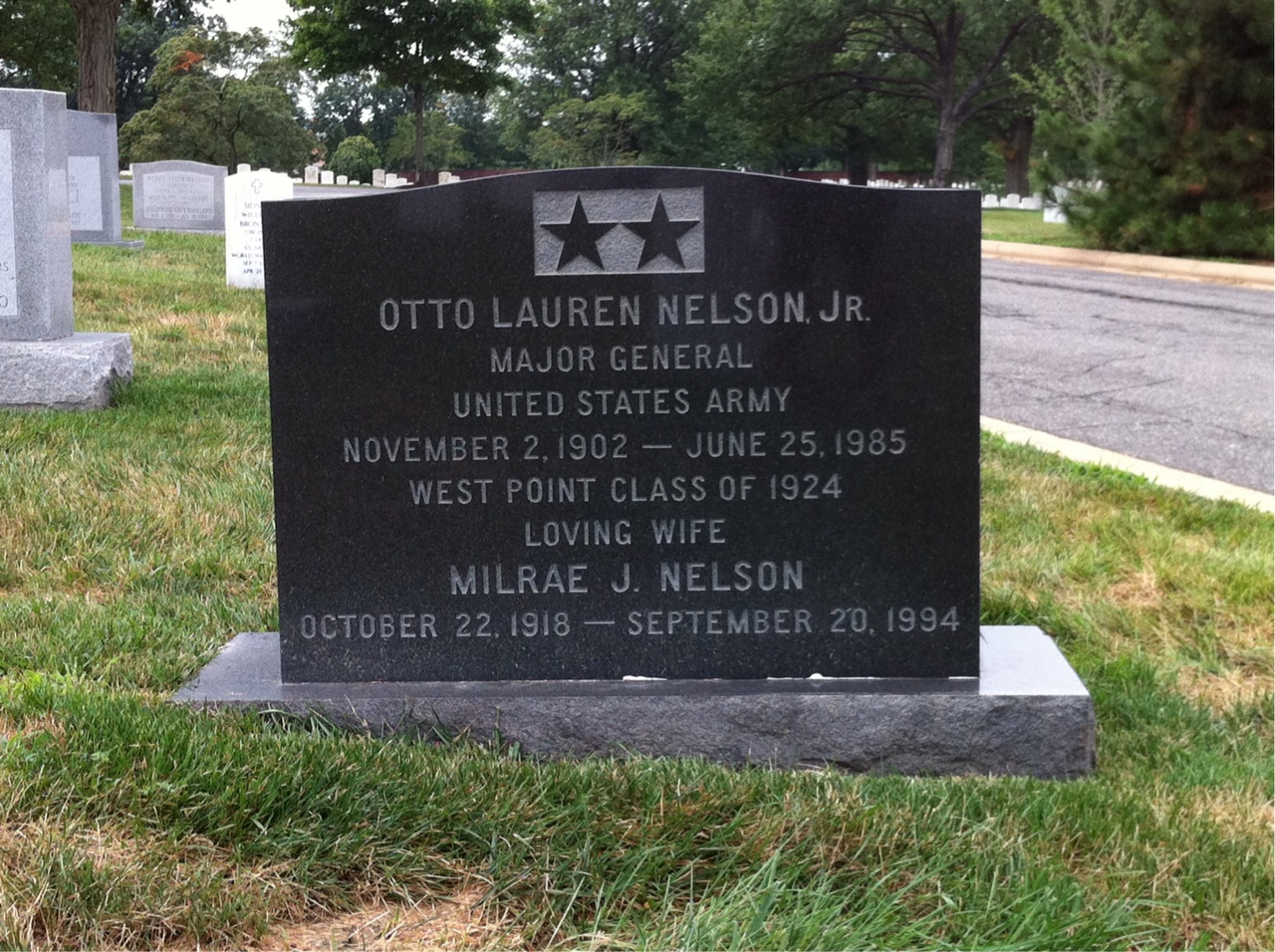
Nelson's grave at Arlington National Cemetery

Otto L. Nelson was born in Omaha, Nebraska on November 2, 1902, the child of Swedish immigrants. He graduated from the United States Military Academy at West Point in 1924 and was commissioned in the Infantry branch.

In 1932 he took a Master of Arts from Columbia University. He graduated from the Command and General Staff School in 1938 and took a PhD degree from Harvard in 1939.

He was a history and economics instructor at West Point from 1929 to 1935, and from 1938 to 1941.

Nelson was a member of the Army General Staff during World War II. He participated in the reorganizations of the Army command structure at the beginning of World War II and at the end of the war. Nelson documented those reorganizations and the history of the Army General Staff in National Security and the General Staff (Washington, DC: Infantry Journal Press, 1946).

Nelson served as a major general from November 13, 1944 to May 31, 1946.

Following his army service, Nelson was an executive with New York Life Insurance Company.

In later life, he resided in Alexandria, Virginia. He died in New Rochelle, New York on June 25, 1985, where he had been competing in a golf tournament. He was buried at Arlington National Cemetery.
