= Rose Mackwelung =

Rose Kaumai Mackwelung (1912 – June 16, 1985) was an educator and activist on the island of Kosrae in the Federated States of Micronesia. She has been described as "the mother of education in Kosrae."

== Early life and education ==
Rose Mackwelung was born in Kiribati (then the British colony of Gilbert and Ellice Islands) in 1912. At age 3, she was adopted by the American missionary Jessie Rebecca Hoppin, who had taught her parents at a missionary school. After living with her adoptive mother on Jaluit Atoll and the island of Kosrae, in 1922 she was sent to the United States, where she completed her education in California.

== Career ==
Mackwelung has been described as the "founder of formal education" on the island of Kosrae. Although she had been encouraged to stay in the United States, where she was told that "even though your skin is dark" she could have been admitted to nursing school, in 1932 she returned to her native Micronesia, where she taught first on Jaluit and then at the Mwot Protestant Mission School on Kosrae. After eight years there, she spent three years teaching at a Japanese school on the island.

In the post-war period, Mackwelung took on a greater role in Kosrae's education system, establishing a teacher training program and setting up the islandwide school system. In 1947, she became the island's superintendent of schools. Then, in 1952, she became Pohnpei's adult education supervisor.

She promoted women's roles in Micronesian society, saying in 1971, "If you ask me what Micronesia needs the most, the answer would be that we need more women educated." One local publication described her as "the first Micronesian woman to take on a public career in addition to the traditional role of homemaker."

Mackwelung became well known for her work beyond Kosrae, particularly in Pohnpei and the Marshall Islands. In particular, she worked to establish women's organizations across the region, including the Ponape Women's Association in 1955, and beginning in 1957 she served as the economic and political advisor to the administrator of Ponape District, which at the time included Kosrae. From 1965 until her retirement in 1974, she served as the district's women's affairs officer. She also traveled internationally to various seminars and conferences, including as the first woman to receive a United Nations Fellowship in Community Development in 1964.

== Later years, death, and legacy ==
Despite a strict Christian upbringing and many years of work in missionary schools, Mackwelung eventually shifted to the Baháʼí Faith. She retired to Kosrae, where she died in 1985 at the age of 73.

In 1994, a new public library in Tofol, Kosrae, was named the Rose Mackwelung Library in her honor.
