= Alden C. Coder =

American football and basketball coach

Biographical details
- Born: December 7, 1909; Calvin, Pennsylvania, U.S.
- Died: June 7, 1985 (aged 75); Montclair, New Jersey, U.S.

Coaching career (HC unless noted)

Football
- 1946–1952: Montclair State
- 1954–1956: Montclair State

Basketball
- 1945–1953: Montclair State

Head coaching record
- Overall: 29–32–4 (football); 114–43 (basketball)

Alden Coy Coder (December 7, 1909 – June 7, 1985) was an American college football and college basketball coach. He served two stints as the head football coach at Montclair State University in Upper Montclair, New Jersey, from 1946 to 1952 and again from 1954 to 1956, compiling a record of 29–32–4. Coder was also the head basketball coach at Montclair State from 1945 to 1953, tallying mark of 114–43. He died in June 1985 after years of declining health.

== Head coaching record ==
=== Football ===
Year	Team	Overall	Conference	Standing	Bowl/playoffs
Montclair State Indians (Independent) (1946–1952)
1946	Montclair State	2–4			
1947	Montclair State	6–0			
1948	Montclair State	3–1–3			
1949	Montclair State	0–6–1			
1950	Montclair State	3–5			
1951	Montclair State	2–3			
1952	Montclair State	4–1			
Montclair State Indians (Independent) (1954–1956)
1954	Montclair State	1–6			
1955	Montclair State	4–3			
1956	Montclair State	4–4			
Montclair State:		29–32–4			
Total:		29–32–4			
