= Stanley Skinner =

English-born American ice hockey player

- Born: October 8, 1893 England, U.K.
- Died: June 7, 1985 (aged 91)
- Position: Right wing
- Played for: Seattle Metropolitans
- Playing career: 1914–1919

Stanley Skinner (October 8, 1893 – June 7, 1985) was an English-born American professional ice hockey player. He played with the Seattle Metropolitans of the Pacific Coast Hockey Association. Skinner was born in England, but grew up in Houghton, Michigan.
