= Leslie L. Westin =

American politician (1917–1985)

Lelslie E. Westin (November 25, 1917 – June 7, 1985) was an American businessperson and politician.

Westin was born in Saint Paul, Minnesota and graduated from Minnehaha Academy in Minneapolis, Minnesota. He graduated from the University of Minnesota with a degree in history and was a social studies teacher for four years. Westin was involved with the life insurance business. Westin lived with his wife and family in Saint Paul, Minnesota. He served in the Minnesota Senate from 1955 to 1962. Westin died from a heart attack in Saint Paul, Minnesota.
