= Charles Brockway =

English cricketer

Personal information
- Full name: Walter Charles Brockway
- Born: 7 March 1907; Blandford Forum, Dorset, England
- Died: 15 June 1985 (aged 78); Harare, Zimbabwe
- Batting: Left-handed
- Bowling: Slow left-arm orthodox

Domestic team information
- Years: Team
- 1951/52: Eastern Province
- 1948: Berkshire
- 1929–1938: Dorset

Career statistics
Competition	First-class
Matches	1
Runs scored	0
Batting average	0.00
100s/50s	–/–
Top score	0
Balls bowled	–
Wickets	–
Bowling average	–
5 wickets in innings	–
10 wickets in match	–
Best bowling	–
Catches/stumpings	–/–
- Source: Cricinfo, 1 June 2011

Walter Charles Brockway (7 May 1907 – 15 June 1985) was an English cricketer. Brockway was a left-handed batsman who bowled slow left-arm orthodox. He was born in Blandford Forum, Dorset.

Brockway made his debut for Dorset in the 1929 Minor Counties Championship against Devon. He played Minor counties cricket for Dorset from 1929 to 1938, making 70 appearances. Following the Second World War, Brockway joined Berkshire County Cricket Club, making 7 appearances for the county in the 1946 Minor Counties Championship.

He later played a single first-class match in South Africa for Eastern Province against Transvaal in 1952. In this match he batted once, being dismissed for a duck by Llewellyn Heaney.

Brockway also umpired in a single first-class match, between Ireland and Scotland in 1939. He died in Harare, Zimbabwe on 15 June 1985.
