= Gloria de Herrera =

American art restorer and collector

Gloria de Herrera (April 26, 1929 – June 24, 1985) was an American art restorer and collector based in France, associated particularly with Henri Matisse.

== Early life and education ==
Gloria Claire de Herrera was born in Los Angeles, California; her mother was named Mildred de Herrera. As a teenager interested in art, she met gallery owner Barbara Byrnes and her husband, curator James Byrnes. Mr. Byrnes offered de Herrera a secretarial job; she learned conservation techniques while working at Los Angeles County Museum of History, Science, and Art.

== Career ==
While she was a young art conservator in Los Angeles, she became acquainted with artist Man Ray and art dealer William Nelson Copley. She was romantically involved with Copley. She moved to Paris along with Copley, Man Ray, and his wife Juliette, in 1951, and lived in France for the rest of her life.

In Paris, she worked as an art restorer under Maurice LeFebvre-Foinet. It was through that job that she became important to the later works of Henri Matisse, assembling his colorful paper collages with her own glue recipe to hold them firmly in place.

Suspected of harboring Algerian Independence movement members in her apartment, Gloria de Herrera was arrested and spent two months in jail. She was exiled from France for several years. She returned to stay in 1968, but her Paris connections were lost, and she moved to the Dordogne region in 1973. While there she was part of the conservation effort at the Lascaux Caves, reproducing the endangered Cro-Magnon paintings at the site; her versions were displayed at the museum in Lascaux.

== Legacy ==
Gloria de Herrera died in June 1985 in Brive-la-Gaillarde, from throat cancer. She was 56 years old. Her papers are at the Getty Research Institute, and they include audio recordings of an interview with de Herrera, conducted by James Byrnes in 1983.

== Other Resources ==
- Gloria de Herrera papers, Getty Research Institute, Los Angeles, Accession No. 980024. The papers include correspondence, documents, artworks, photographs, and audiovisual materials documenting De Herrera's milieu and activities.
