= Christopher Le Fleming =

English composer of choral music (1908–1985)

Christopher Kaye Le Fleming (26 February 1908 – 19 June 1985) was an English composer of choral music, pianist, teacher and administrator.

Le Fleming was born at Wimborne Minster in Dorset. He suffered from defective eyesight from birth. Nevertheless he sung in the Minster Choir (where Edmund Fellowes was a canon), began learning piano and studied at the Brighton School of Music. His eyesight prevented him from attending the Royal College of Music. But he performed the Schumann A minor Concerto under Dan Godfrey in Bournemouth and studied informally with Vaughan Williams, who remained a lifelong friend. He then continued his education at the Royal School of Church Music in London while studying piano with George Reeves (c1900-1960).

He married Phyllis Mary Tanner in 1932 and there were three sons. They moved first to Southbourne and then to Fisherton de la Mere. During the war Le Fleming served in the Royal Army Medical Corps, and in the mid-1940s medical intervention improved his eyesight. From 1943 he became a primary school music teacher and two years later was appointed Assistant Director of the Rural Music Schools Association. From 1946 until 1976 he edited the Association's journal, Making Music and continued as a teacher in various positions. After the death of his wife Phyllis in 1978 he married again, to Mary Carr. He was also a leading figure in the Composers' Guild of Great Britain. His last years were spent in Woodbury, East Devon. He wrote an autobiography three years before his death, aged 77.

== Composition ==
Le Fleming wrote orchestral music (such as the Southwark Festival Overture and the orchestral suite London River (1956), music for plays, chamber music (Hommage to Beatrix Potter for wind ensemble), educational music (the Peter Rabbit books for piano) and songs. But he is best remembered for his choral music. His first published work was Cradle Song for Christmas, issued by OUP in 1929. The cantata for children's voices The Echoing Green, op. 5, was composed in 1933 and published by J.W. Chester. On a larger scale the five movement cantata The Singing Friar: Songs of the Greenwood, op. 9 for tenor, chorus and small orchestra, followed in 1937. Other choral works include Five Psalms, op. 10 (1940), the Evening Service in D op. 22 (1953) and the cantata Valley of Arun op. 33 (1961), which uses a more dissonant, impressionistic style than his previous pieces. According to David Urrows The Christmas Triptych op. 38 (1966), consisting of three motets for six-part chorus, represents "a distillation of all Le Fleming's choral concerns: clarity of line and diction and a diatonic harmonic idiom inflected by chromatic parallelism".

His piano transcriptions of Bach and Johann Strauss (including The Blue Danube) have also remained popular.
