= Olof Möller =

Swedish science fiction author

Olof Möller (July 3, 1923, Riga – June 8, 1985, Solna) was a Swedish science fiction author. He is thought to be the most prolific Swedish science fiction writer, though most of his writing can be classified as pulp. He published 30 pocket books in the Jaktrymdskepp X12 ("Fighter Starship X12") series between 1974 and 1980.

Möller was born in Riga, Latvia, the son of medical practitioner and scientist Maximilian Möller and the German-born author Camilla Möller. The family fled to Sweden in 1939. Möller graduated from the Stockholm Institute of Commerce in 1941. He supported himself with a number of varied jobs and self-owned enterprises. From 1976 to 1985 he was responsible for educational literature at the Military Academy Karlberg in Stockholm.

== Selected works ==
- Rymdskepp i lågor (1980)
- Astronaut FZ (1980)
- Istiden kommer ("The Ice Age Cometh") (1980)
- Snabbare än ljuset ("Faster than Light") (1980)
- De tre galaxerna ("The Three Galaxies") (1980)
- Gigantstaden ("The Gigantic City") (1980)
- Datorama ("Computerama") (1980)
- Åter till jorden ("Return to Earth") (1980)
- Planeten Drabos ("The Planet Drabos") (1980)
- Mikro-universums gåta ("Riddle of the Micro-Universe") (1979)
- Asteroid på drift ("Drifting Asteroid") (1979)
- Kvinnoplaneten Q ("Q, Planet of Women") (1979)
- Rymdens vikingar ("Vikings of Space") (1979)
- Skräckfärd i rymden ("Journey of Terror in Space") (1979)
- Domen ("The Verdict") (1979)
- Gemini (1978)
- Planettribunalen ("The Planetary Tribunal") (1978)
- Spion i rymden ("Spy in Space") (1978)
- Övergiven planet ("Deserted Planet") (1978)
- Robotmordet ("The Robot Murder") (1978)
- Davids stjärna ("David's Star") (1978)
- Fjärde dimensionen ("The Fourth Dimension") (1977)
- Tvillingplaneterna ("The Twin Planets") (1977)
- Rymdhajen ("The Space Shark") (1977)
- Kosmos brinner ("Cosmos on Fire") (1977)
- Kometkatastrofen ("The Comet Disaster") (1977)
- Nytt vapen ("A New Weapon") (1977)
- Rymdvisionen ("The Vision of Space") (1976)
- Seende planet ("Seeing Planet") (1975)
- Humanoidupproret ("The Humanoid Rebellion") (1975)
- Mazos grymhet ("The Cruelty of Mazos") (1975)
- Guldmånen ("The Moon of Gold") (1975)
- Stellarernas angrepp ("Assault of the Stellars") (1975)
