= Věra Lišková =

Czech glass artist (1924–1985)

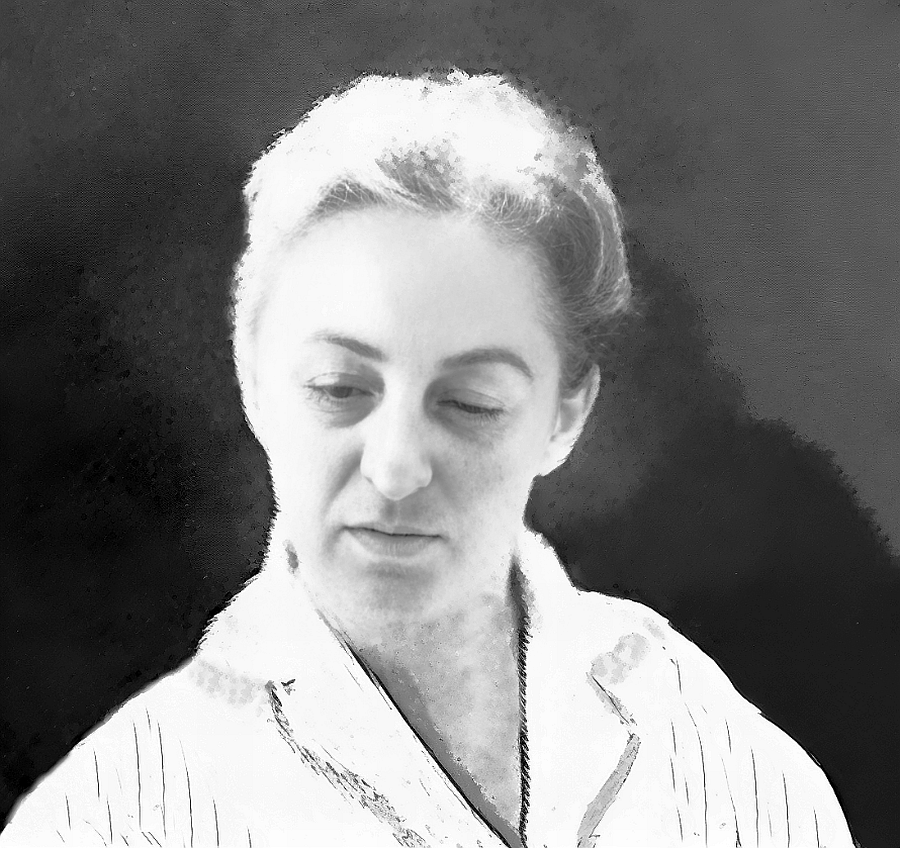
Věra Lišková

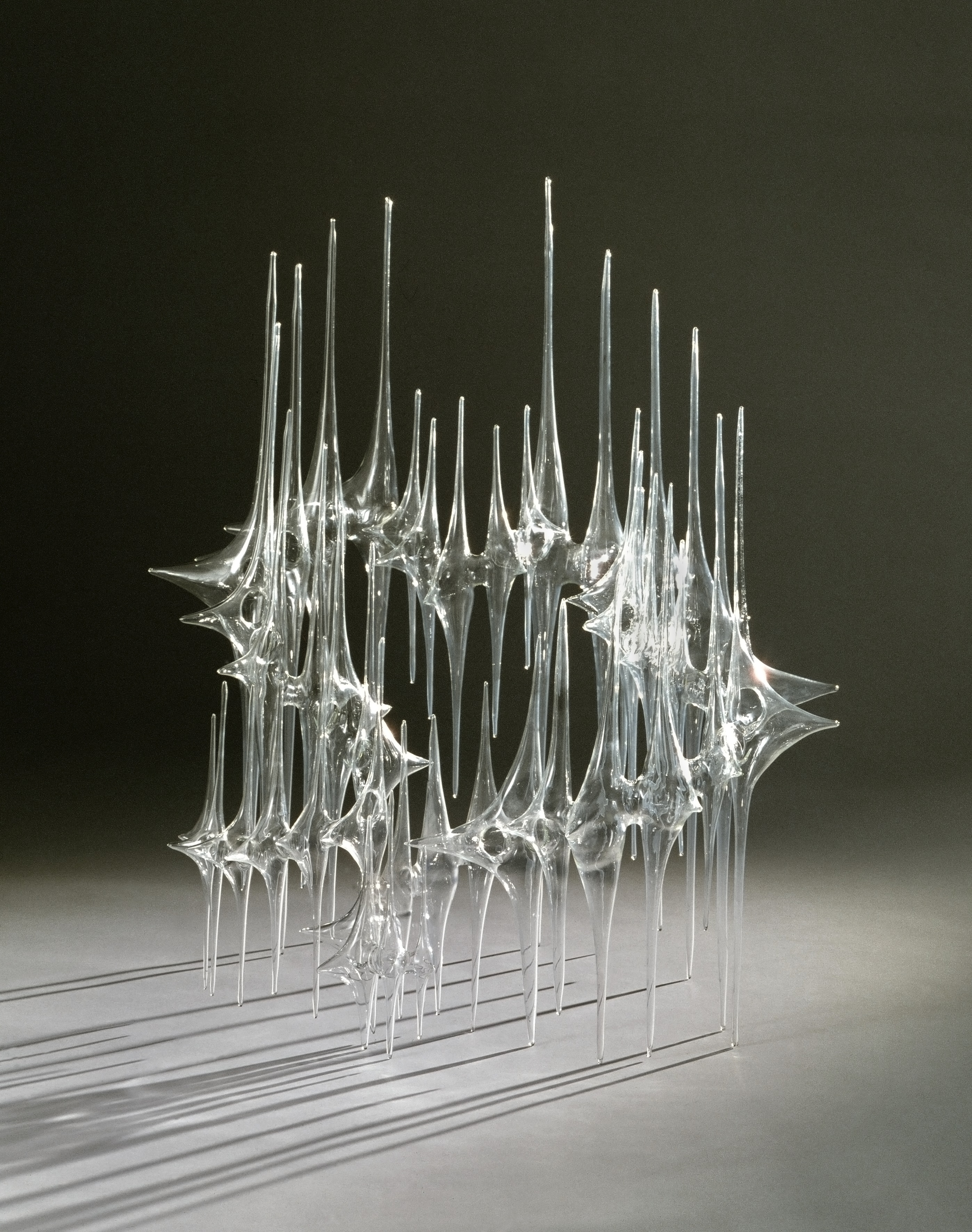
Glass object "Music" (1977)

Věra Lišková (20 September 1924, Prague – 7 June 1985, Prague) was a Czech glass artist. She is known for pioneering the use of borosilicate glass or pyrex in glass art.

== Education and career ==
Lišková studied at the State Graphic School in Prague until it closed due to World War II. She then studied at the School of Applied Arts in Prague and graduated in 1949.

As a student in 1947, she applied for a scholarship offered by the J. & L. Lobmeyr in Kamenický Šenov. Under the guidance of Stephan Rath, the nephew of the company's founders, she created a thin-walled drinkware set adorned with engraving. The set received an award from the Ministry of Industry and became part of the collection of the Museum of Decorative Arts in Prague. Her glass, displayed in the first solo exhibition at the Museum of Modern Art in New York, was acquired for the museum's collections by the then-director Kaufmann. Until 1959, Lišková had a total of five solo exhibitions in this museum.

Lišková acquired Gočár's studio at 72 Mánesova Street in Vinohrady, where from the mid-60s onwards, she crafted sculptures from technical glass shaped over a gas flame. She began making borosilicate glass sculptures in the late 1966. Some of her designs were also brought to life by glass blowers and František Kirchner. Her work was instrumental in recognizing glass as an artistic medium.

== Art ==
Lišková is known for pioneering the use of borosilicate glass or pyrex in glass art. Borosilicate glass is traditionally used in manufacturing scientific apparatus such as test tubes and beakers.

Lišková is best known for large, abstract sculptures that are made of clear glass. Her strong yet delicate sculptures feature intricate patterns. Most of her works feature spiny, sharp designs and clean lines.

== Selected works ==
- Hanging vase
- Anthem of joy in glass
- Zodiac beaker
- Verbundene Vase, auch Vasen im Ikebanastil
- Harmonie
- Würfelspiel (Hrakostek)
- Ram Aries
- Echo
