= William John Burton =

New Zealand lithographic draughtsman, rifleman, and archer

William John Burton (8 March 1908 – 6 June 1985) was a New Zealand lithographic draughtsman, rifleman and archer. He was born in Hoylake, Cheshire, England on 8 March 1908.
