= Edward Edgar Foden =

British marine engineer

Edward Edgar Foden (14 February 1913 – 8 June 1985) was a British marine engineer and inventor. He lived until his death in Walker, Newcastle upon Tyne, England. He is credited with the invention of many devices for ships such as a cargo hatch cover, lifeboat davits, and an escape hatch for submarines. His inventions are cataloged in the Newcastle-based Discovery Museum.

Foden made little money from his inventions, as he sold off the patent rights for small reward and to support his family. However, the manufacturers of his inventions made millions.
