= Sibbarp, Varberg Municipality =

Coordinates: 57°01′38″N 12°32′04″E

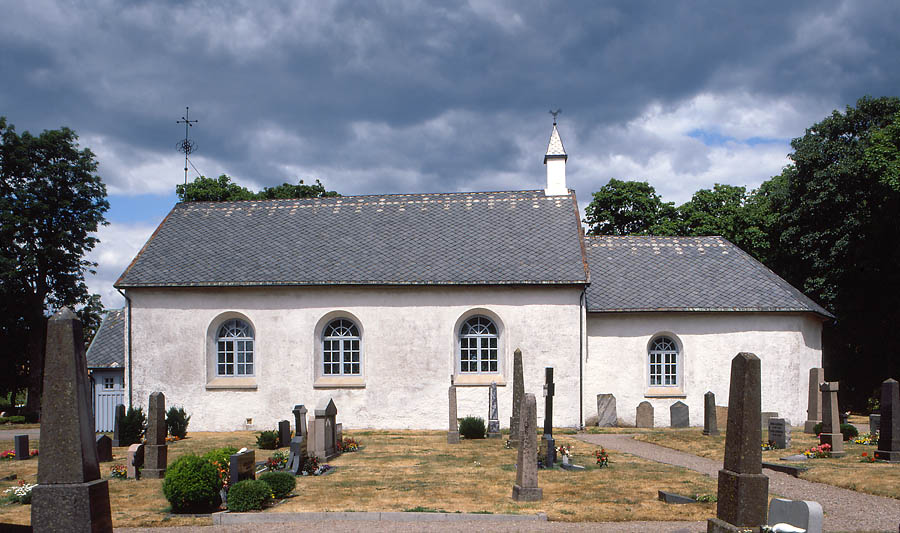

Sibbarp is a village and a former parish in Varberg Municipality, Halland, Sweden. Sibbarp was first mentioned in 1354 as Sigbiornathorp. The name is formed of Sigbjörn (a male name) and thorp.

The former Sibbard parish covered an area of 64 km^{2} (25 sq mi). 1 January 2006 it was merged with Dagsås to form Sibbarp-Dagsås parish.

== Geology ==
The western parts of the parish are dominated by red gneiss, while the eastern parts are dominated by grey gneiss. The parish is rather hilly.

== History ==
The parish has several remains from the Bronze and Iron Age. Iron extraction took place in Järnvirke (as well as in neighboring Järnmölle, Tvååker) during medieval times.

== See also ==
- Asmund's well

== Sources ==
- Sibbarp och Dagsås - Kulturbygd med härliga höjder, betagande bokskog och trolska sjöar, Larsson, Ulf (ed.). 1993. Kristinstad: Utsikten. ISBN 91-971707-4-7
