= Borges (surname) =

Borges (Spanish: [ˈboɾxes], European Portuguese: [ˈbɔɾʒɨʃ]) is a Portuguese and Spanish surname. Jorge Luis Borges, the most notable person with this name, notes that his family name, like Burgess in English, means "of the town", "bourgeois".

Notable people with the surname include:

- António Borges (1949–2013), Portuguese economist and banker
- António Borges (equestrian) (1906–2011), Portuguese horse rider
- Ary Borges (born 1999), Brazilian footballer
- Carlos Borges (1932–2014), Uruguayan footballer
- Celso Borges (born 1988), Costa Rican footballer
- Desmin Borges, American actor
- Fernanda Borges (born 1969), East Timorese politician
- Francisco L. Borges (born 1951), American politician born in Cape Verde
- Graciela Borges (born 1941), Argentine actress
- Gustavo Borges (born 1972), Brazilian swimmer
- Hernâni Borges (born 1981), Cape Verdean footballer
- Humberlito Borges Teixeira (born 1980), Brazilian footballer
- Ione Borges (1951–2025), Brazilian television presenter and actress
- Jorge Guillermo Borges Haslam, Argentine writer
- Jorge Luis Borges (1899–1986), Argentine writer
- José Borges, Cuban baseball player
- José Francisco Borges (1935–2024), Brazilian folk poet and woodcut artist
- Juan Borges Mateos (born 1966), Cuban chess player
- Julio Borges (born 1969), Venezuelan politician
- Lô Borges (1952–2025), Brazilian songwriter, singer and guitarist
- Lucas Borges (born 1980), Argentine rugby player
- Maria Borges (born 1992), Angolan model
- Neusa Borges (born 1941), Brazilian actress
- Norah Borges (1901–1998), Argentine artist
- Nuno Borges (disambiguation), several people
- Phil Borges (born 1942), photographer
- Raúl Borges (1882–1967), Venezuelan pedagogue, guitarist and composer
- Ron Borges, American sportswriter
- Rowllin Borges (born 1992), Indian footballer
- Servio Borges (born 1947), Cuban baseball manager
- Tristan Borges (born 1998), Canadian soccer player
- Víctor Borges (born 1955), Cape Verdean foreign minister
- Wágner de Andrade Borges (born 1987), Brazilian footballer
- Waldemar Borges (1958–2026), Brazilian politician
- Willian Borges da Silva (born 1988), Brazilian footballer

== See also ==
- Borges (disambiguation)
- Burges, English surname
- Burgess (surname), English surname
- Borge (surname), Danish surname
