= Action of 4 April 1941 =

Naval battle during the Second World War

- Part of The Battle of the Atlantic in the Second World War
- Modern map of the Cape Verde islands
| Date | 4 April 1941 |
| Location | mid-Atlantic Ocean 14°30′N 40°30′W |
| Result | German victory |

Belligerents
| United Kingdom | Germany |

Commanders and leaders
| J. A. Blackburn | Otto Kähler |

Strength
| Armed merchant cruiser HMS Voltaire | Auxiliary cruiser Thor |

Casualties and losses
| 74 killed; ~100 wounded; 195 captured; Voltaire sunk; ~200 later killed | Thor lightly damaged |

The action of 4 April 1941 was a naval engagement fought during the Battle of the Atlantic during the Second World War. A German commerce raider, Thor (Schiff 10 to the Kriegsmarine, Raider E to the British), encountered the British armed merchant cruiser HMS Voltaire and sank her after a short engagement. The German crew rescued the British survivors, some of whom were repatriated and gave an account to the Admiralty. It was accepted that German commerce raiders were too well armed for converted ocean liners equipped with obsolete guns but nothing else was available to the Royal Navy until later in the war.

== Background ==
=== Thor ===
During the 1930s, the Kriegsmarine had paid banana plantations in Central America to have banana boats built by German yards, suitable for quick conversion for navy use. Such ships were faster than average freighters [18 kn (33 km/h; 21 mph)] and sat lower in the water, making smaller targets. The Oldenburg-Portugiesische Dampfschiffahrtsgesellschaft (OPDR, Oldenburg-Portuguese Steamship Company) banana boat Santa Cruz (3,862 gross register tons [GRT]) was taken over by the Kriegsmarine and converted into the auxiliary cruiser Thor (HSK-4 or Schiff 10 to the Kriegsmarine, Raider E to the Admiralty) by Deutsche Werft AG. The ship was armed with six 150 mm (5.9 in) guns, one 60 mm (2.4 in) gun, two 37 mm (1.46 in) Flak, four 20 mm (0.79 in) Flak and four 533 mm (21.0 in) torpedo tubes. The raider also carried an Arado Ar 196A-1 floatplane for reconnaissance and had a crew of 349.

=== HMS Voltaire ===
Voltaire was built by Workman & Clark in 1923 as a passenger liner of the Lamport and Holt line, carrying passengers and freight between New York and Buenos Aires. The ship displaced 13,245 long tons (13,458 t), had a speed of 14.5 kn (26.9 km/h; 16.7 mph) and a crew of 269. Used first as a troopship and then as an accommodation ship at Scapa Flow, it was later sent to Wallsend and equipped as an armed merchant cruiser (AMC). Voltaire carried eight 152 mm (6-inch) and two 3.0 in (76 mm) naval guns, including at least one anti-aircraft mount. Voltaire patrolled the Mediterranean enforcing contraband regulations, then sailed to Halifax, Nova Scotia to escort convoys across the Atlantic. Having refitted at Saint John, New Brunswick, Voltaire sailed for Trinidad and was then sent across the South Atlantic towards Freetown in Sierra Leone searching for commerce raiders.

== Prelude ==
=== Raiding voyage ===
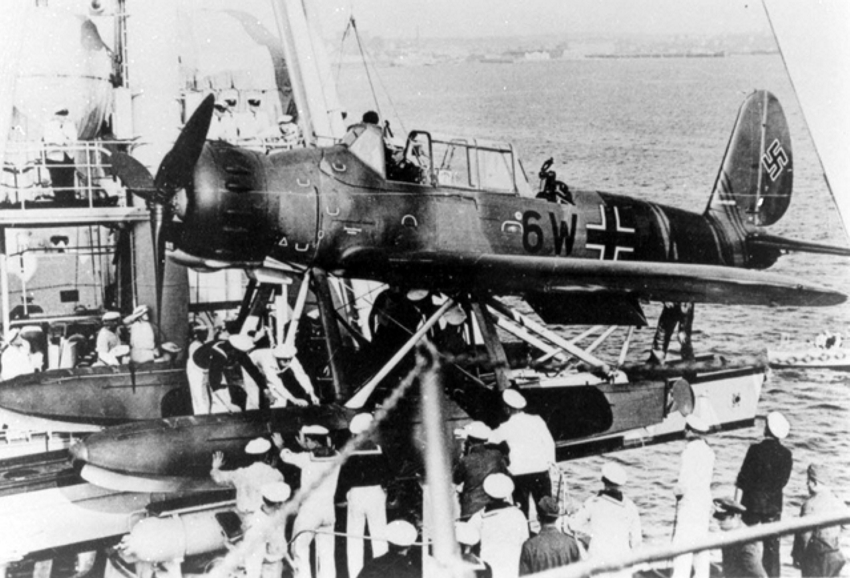
Example of an Ar 196 being loaded onto the cruiser Admiral Hipper in 1941

On 6 June 1940, Thor (Kapitän zur See Otto Kähler) sailed on a raiding voyage to the central and south Atlantic, disguised as the Soviet merchant ship Orsk, before departing Norway and passing through the Denmark Strait on 16 June. On 1 July, when dressed up as a Jugoslav freighter, the Dutch Kertosono was intercepted and sent back to France as a prize. On 7 June, the British Delambre was overhauled and sunk; two days later the Belgian ship Bruges was sunk. On 14 July, Gracefield was sunk; none of the ships got off a distress report. On 16 July, the British ship Wendover fought back and managed to transmit a report before being sunk by gunfire and torpedoes, after the crew was taken prisoner, bringing the total on board to over 200 men. The Dutch Tela, carrying food, was captured the next day, alleviating the difficulty of feeding the captives.

=== HMS Alcantara ===
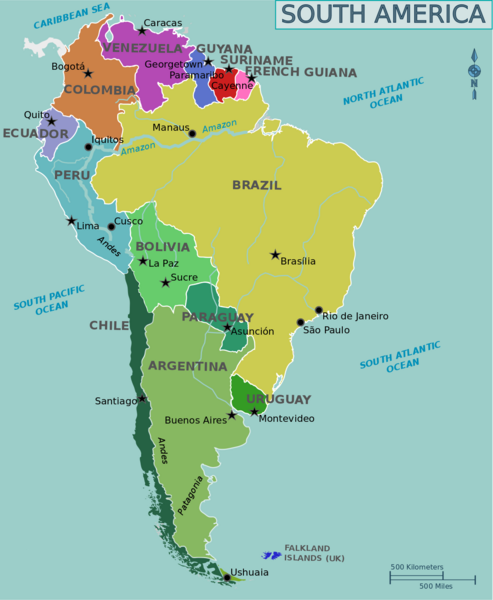
Modern map of South America showing Rio and the River Plate

On 28 July, Thor encountered the AMC HMS Alcantara at 24°29′S 33°7′W, not far from Trindade, about 600 nmi (1,100 km; 690 mi) off the Brazilian coast. Wireless reports and overdue ships had indicated to the British that a raider was operating in the Atlantic and Alcantara had been sent to investigate. Thor was armed with guns that considerably outranged the armament carried by Alcantara but Thor was slower and had to engage the AMC. In an engagement that lasted for about four hours, Thor inflicted serious damage and received two hits in return; Alcantara making slowly for Brazil. Thor sailed away to the south behind a smoke screen, to make repairs and to rendezvous with a supply ship. On 26 September, in the south Atlantic, Thor sank the Norwegian ship Kosmos III, then the British Natia on 8 October; Thor now carrying more than 360 prisoners. On 9 November Thor rendezvoused with the blockade-runner Rio Grande, which delivered supplies and took off most of the prisoners.

=== HMS Carnarvon Castle ===
On 5 December Thor met the AMC Carnarvon Castle east of South America at 30°52′S 42°53′W. Thor out-gunned and out-ranged Carnarvon Castle but was too slow to out-run the AMC. Thor inflicted so much damage with her stern armament that the AMC had to make for port for repairs. Thor rendezvoused with Admiral Scheer and a captured freighter on 25 December, from which supplies were generously replenished. Several British cruisers were concentrated off the River Plate and Rio de Janeiro but Thor met few ships, apart from German supply vessels, for three months. Thor communicated information of its superiority against the British AMCs which gave the crews of other raiders greater confidence against them. On 25 March 1941, the passenger liner Britannia was sunk and the occupants left behind in lifeboats, because Thor had intercepted an RRR (raider report) call from Britannia and a reply from what the captain took to be a British warship nearby. (Note: Thor left 527 people behind, Kähler assuming that the reply to the RRR call meant that they would soon be picked up; the survivors were not rescued for three weeks, during which nearly 200 died.) Later that day Thor sank the Swedish ship Trolleholm.

== Action ==
In early April 1941, the AMC HMS Voltaire (Captain James Blackburn) sailed from Trinidad in the Caribbean for Freetown, Sierra Leone and to search west of the Cape Verde islands for commerce raiders en route. On 4 April Thor was back in the area to the north-east of Brazil, posing as a Greek freighter and at 06:15, her lookouts reported smoke on the horizon to port. The ship was Voltaire; Kähler turned toward the vessel, not realising that it was an AMC, and the British assumed that they had met a small freighter and closed on her to check. Voltaire sailed nearly straight at Thor from about 15,000 yd (14,000 m); at 06:45 and about 9,000 yd (8,200 m), Kähler had the forward 150 mm gunfire a warning shot across the ship's bow. Kähler was surprised when the ship returned fire and replied with two guns; this time, an AMC was well within range and converging when the engagement began.

Location map of the Cape Verde islands

The German gunners managed to hit Voltaire with their opening salvo of four shells destroying the radio room before an RRR report could be sent and destroyed the fire-control system. Voltaire was set on fire in four minutes. Lacking her fire control system, Voltaire could not synchronise her 6-inch guns, so their fire became slow and inaccurate. At 07:15, it was hit in the steering gear and turned circles at 13 kn (24 km/h; 15 mph). Blackburn abandoned the bridge when it was ablaze and went to the stern to command one of the two remaining 6-in guns but only managed to hit the top of Thor's mast. Kähler fired two torpedoes from 7,000 yd (6,400 m) but they missed. At about 08:00 Blackburn gave the order "abandon ship" and at 08:35 Voltaire rolled over and sank. Thor took aboard 189 survivors; 76 of the crew had been killed or died of wounds. In 55 minutes Thor had fired 724 rounds, inflicted many hits, for only minor damage.

Rather than leave the crew to be rescued, Kähler had the area searched for five hours, regardless of any ships appearing. Thor sailed north, changed disguise, rendezvoused with the tanker Ill, then set course for Europe. German wireless broadcasts made much of the sinking of Voltaire but did not disclose the identity of the raider. When the Germans announced the sinking of Voltaire, the Admiralty sent the Canadian AMC Prince David to search, which found wreckage half-way between Trinidad and the Cape Verde Islands. The British were ignorant of the details of the engagement until survivors were repatriated from Germany.

== Aftermath ==
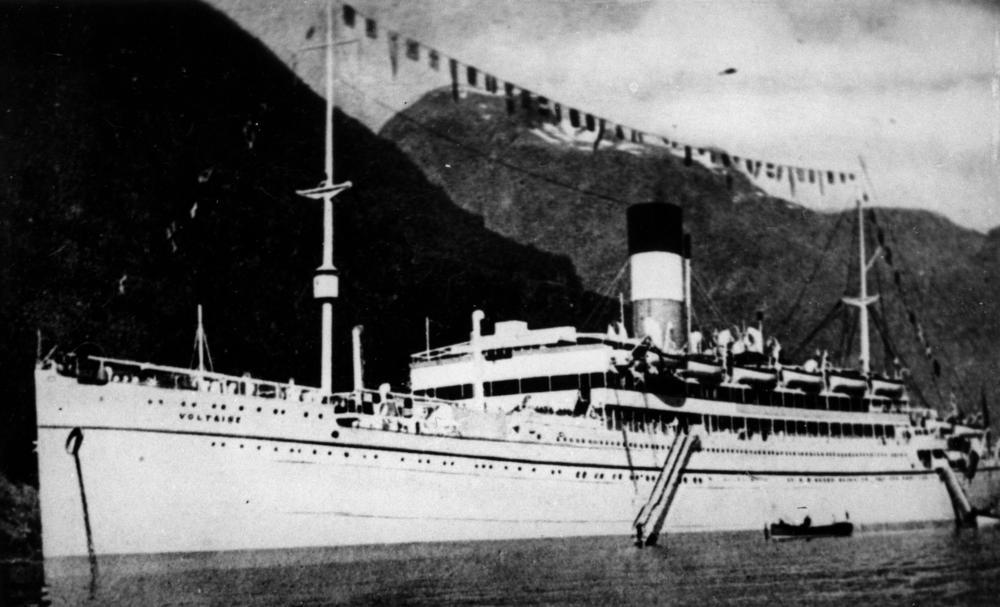
The Lamport and Holt Ltd passenger liner SS Voltaire, later the British armed merchant cruiser HMS Voltaire

Thor sank a Swedish freighter on 16 April, her eleventh success, a total of 83,301 long tons (84,638 t) of shipping and one AMC sunk. Thor reached the Bay of Biscay on 23 April, slipped up the Channel and arrived at Hamburg on 30 April. The Admiralty understood how inadvisable it was to fit obsolete guns on slow and old liners as trade protection vessels but lacked the modern guns and ships to take on German commerce-raiders until later in the war. Thor made another cruise in 1942 and eventually reached Japan. It was burnt out in Yokohama when a nearby supply ship, Uckermarck, exploded and caught fire while her fuel tanks were being cleaned.

== See also ==
- Single ship action
- Northern Patrol
