= Borge (surname) =

Borge is a Norwegian-Danish and Spanish surname. The Spanish version of the surname is a variant of Borges, or a toponymic surname from El Borge. The Norwegian-Danish version is a variant of Borg, meaning 'fortification'. Notable people with the surname include:

== Danish and Norwegian ==
- Bernhard Borge, pseudonym of André Bjerke (1918–1985), Norwegian writer and poet
- Brita Borge (1931–2013), Norwegian politician
- Celine Borge (born 1998), Norwegian professional golfer
- Eivind N. Borge (born 1950), Norwegian politician for the Progress Party
- Erik Borge (1924–2008), Norwegian film director and screenwriter
- Espen Borge (born 1961), retired Norwegian runner
- Knut Borge (1949-2017), Norwegian journalist and entertainer
- Mikkel Johannesen Borge (1791–1844), Norwegian politician
- Ole Borge (1916–1995), Norwegian jurist and resistance member during World War II
- Sigrid Borge (born 1995), Norwegian javelin thrower
- Victor Borge (1909–2000), Danish-American pianist and comedian
- Victor Borge (bassist) (born 1965), the bassist in the Norwegian hard rock band TNT

== Spanish ==
- Andrés Borge (born 2001), Spanish footballer
- Kamel Nacif Borge (born 1946), Puebla-based Mexican businessman
- María José García Borge (born 1956), Spanish scientist and nuclear scientist
- Miguel Borge Martín (born 1943), Mexican politician in the Institutional Revolutionary Party
- Roberto Borge Angulo (born 1979), Mexican politician with the Institutional Revolutionary Party
- Tomás Borge (1930–2012), Nicaraguan politician
- Vicente Borge (born 1968), retired Spanish footballer

== Other parts of the world ==
- Dylan Borge (born 2003), Gibraltarian footballer
- Twinkle Borge (1969–2024), Hawaiian activist
