= SS Bruges =

SS Bruges is the name of the following ships:

- SS Bruges (1904), sunk 11 June 1940
- SS Bruges (1920), sunk 9 July 1940

== See also ==
- Bruges (disambiguation)
