= SS Britannia (1925) =

UK steam ocean liner sunk during World War II

Coordinates: 7.24°N 24.03°W

History

United Kingdom
- Name: Britannia
- Owner: Anchor Line, Glasgow
- Port of registry: Glasgow
- Route: Glasgow – Bombay
- Builder: Alexander Stephen and Sons, Glasgow
- Yard number: 508
- Launched: 1 December 1925
- Completed: March 1926
- Maiden voyage: 3 March 1926
- Out of service: 25 March 1941
- Identification: UK official number 148894; code letters KTSW (until 1933); call sign GLZN (1934 onward)
- Fate: Sunk by gunfire

General characteristics
- Type: Ocean liner
- Tonnage: 8,802 GRT; 5,281 NRT
- Length: 460 ft 1 in (140.23 m)
- Beam: 59 ft 7 in (18.16 m)
- Depth: 30 ft 8 in (9.35 m)
- Decks: 2
- Installed power: 558 NHP
- Propulsion: quadruple expansion engine
- Speed: 14 knots (26 km/h)
- Capacity: 175 first class passengers
- Crew: 203
- Sensors & processing systems: wireless direction finding (by 1930); echo sounding device (by 1937)
- Armament: (as DEMS): one stern-mounted naval gun

SS Britannia was a UK steam ocean liner that was built in Scotland in 1925–26 and operated by Anchor Line (Henderson Brothers). In 1941 a German merchant raider sank Britannia with the loss of 249 lives.

== Building and peacetime career ==
Alexander Stephen and Sons of Linthouse, Glasgow built Britannia, launching her on 1 December 1925 and completing her in March 1926. She was 460 ft 1 in (140.23 m) long and had a beam of 59 ft 7 in (18.16 m). As built her tonnages were 8,802 GRT and 5,281 NRT. She had a quadruple expansion engine that developed 558 NHP and gave her a cruising speed of 14 knots (26 km/h).

On 3 March 1926 Britannia began her maiden voyage from Glasgow to Bombay, which became her regular route.

By 1930 Britannia was equipped with wireless direction finding. By 1937 an echo sounding device had been added.

== Loss ==
On 25 March 1941 Britannia was in the Atlantic 750 miles west of Freetown en route from Liverpool to Bombay when the German auxiliary cruiser Thor intercepted her. Britannia's wireless operator transmitted an "RRR" raider warning message, which a radio station in Sierra Leone acknowledged.

Britannia was defensively armed with one naval gun on her stern. She resisted the merchant raider for more than an hour before her Master, Captain Collie, gave the order to abandon ship. Thor's bombardment had damaged some of Britannia's lifeboats. Sources disagree as to whether Thor's Captain, Otto Kähler, ordered a pause in the bombardment to allow Britannia to lower her boats and get everyone away, but they agree that he did not stop to rescue survivors.

After 36 hours the Spanish ship Bachi rescued 63 survivors. On 29 March the Spanish ocean liner Cabo de Hornos, sailing from South America to Spain, rescued 77 survivors from various boats and a raft near Tenerife.

Britannia's Third Officer, William McVicar, commanded lifeboat number seven. It was certified to carry 56 people but packed with 82, some of whom were wounded. Although they were nearer Africa than South America, McVicar elected to sail west due to the prevailing currents and winds. The voyage lasted 23 days, in which time 44 people in the boat died. After sailing 1,535 miles the 38 survivors came ashore near São Luís in Brazil. For their achievement McVicar and the ship's surgeon, Nancy Miller, were awarded the MBE. One of the survivors from McVicar's boat, Lt-Cdr Frank West MBE, wrote a book, Lifeboat Number Seven, describing their voyage.

In total 122 of Britannia's crew and 127 of her passengers were lost.

== Bibliography ==
- Slader, John (1988). The Red Duster at War. London: William Kimber & Co Ltd. p. 125. ISBN 0-7183-0679-1.
- West, Frank (1960). Lifeboat Number Seven. London: William Kimber & Co Ltd.
