= Bruges (disambiguation) =

Bruges is a city in Belgium.

Bruges may also refer to:

== Places ==
- Bruges, Gironde, France
- Bruges, Pyrénées-Atlantiques, France

== Other uses ==
- Grafen Bruges-von Pfuel, German Uradel ("ancient nobility")
- In Bruges (2008), black comedy crime film
- SS Bruges (1904), a Belgian cargo ship sunk by a German auxiliary cruiser in the South Atlantic in July 1940
- SS Bruges (1920), passenger ship bombed and damaged on 11 June 1940 at Le Havre by Luftwaffe aircraft
- Bruges Group, a British think-tank

== See also ==
- Bruges speech
- Burges (disambiguation)
