= Burges =

Burges is a surname. Notable people with the surname include:

- Alan Burges (1911–2002), Australian botanist
- Anthony Burges (or Burgess; d. 1664), English Nonconformist clergyman
- Cornelius Burges (1589?–1665), English minister
- Daniel Burges (1873–1946), British soldier
- Dempsey Burges (1751–1800), US Representative from North Carolina
- George Burges (1786–1864), British classical scholar
- James Burges a.k.a. Sir James Lamb, 1st Baronet (1752–1824), British author, lawyer, and politician
- John Burges (or Burgess; 1563–1635), English clergyman and physician
- John Smith-Burges, 1st Baronet Smith-Burges (c. 1734–1803), an official of the British East India Company
- Judy Burges (b. 1943), member of the Arizona State Senate
- Lockier Burges (Australian politician) (1814–1886), Australian politician
- Lockier Burges (1841-1929), Australian explorer, entrepreneur, and author
- Mary Anne Burges (1763–1813), British writer
- Richard Fenner Burges (1873–1945), Texan attorney, legislator, and conservationist
- Tristam Burges (1770–1853), US Representative from Rhode Island
- William Burges (1827–1881), British architect
- William Burges (politician) (c.1807–1876), Australian politician
- Michala Burges (b. 1995), American researcher and physician

== See also ==
- Burgess (disambiguation)
- Bruges (disambiguation)
