= Borges (disambiguation) =

Jorge Luis Borges (1899–1986) was an Argentine writer.

Borges may also refer to:

- Borges (surname)
- Les Borges Blanques, capital of Les Garrigues, Catalonia, Spain
- Les Borges del Camp, Baix Camp, Catalonia, Spain
- Borges Importadora, Brazilian TV series.
