= SS Bruges (1904) =

History

Belgium
- Name: Bruges
- Namesake: Bruges, Belgium
- Owner: Adolf Deppe - Cie Nationale Belge de Transports Maritimes
- Builder: Tecklenborg J. C. - Johann Carl Tecklenborg A.G. (Abegg, J.S.)
- Launched: 15 August 1904
- Completed: October 1904
- Fate: Sunk 9 July 1940

General characteristics
- Type: Cargo ship
- Tonnage: 4,984 GRT
- Length: 122.19 metres (400 ft 11 in)
- Beam: 15.91 metres (52 ft 2 in)
- Depth: 7.77 metres (25 ft 6 in)
- Installed power: Quadruple 4cyl expansion engine
- Speed: 11 knots
- Crew: 44

SS Bruges was a Belgian cargo ship that was shelled by the German auxiliary cruiser Thor in the South Atlantic at (4°S 28°W).

== Construction ==
The SS Bruges was constructed in 1904 at the Joh. C. Tecklenborg A.G. shipyard in Geestemunde, Germany. She was completed in 1904 and sailed under the Belgian flag.

The ship was 122.19 metres (400 ft 11 in) long, with a beam of 15.91 metres (52 ft 2 in). She had a depth of 7.77 metres (25 ft 6 in). The ship was assessed at 4,984 GRT. She had a quadruple 4cyl expansion engine. The engine was rated at 505 nhp.

== Sinking ==
On 9 July 1940, Bruges was shelled and sunk by Thor in the South Atlantic, (4°S 28°W) . The 44 crew members were taken Prisoners of war.
