= German auxiliary cruiser Thor =

German commerce raider in World War II

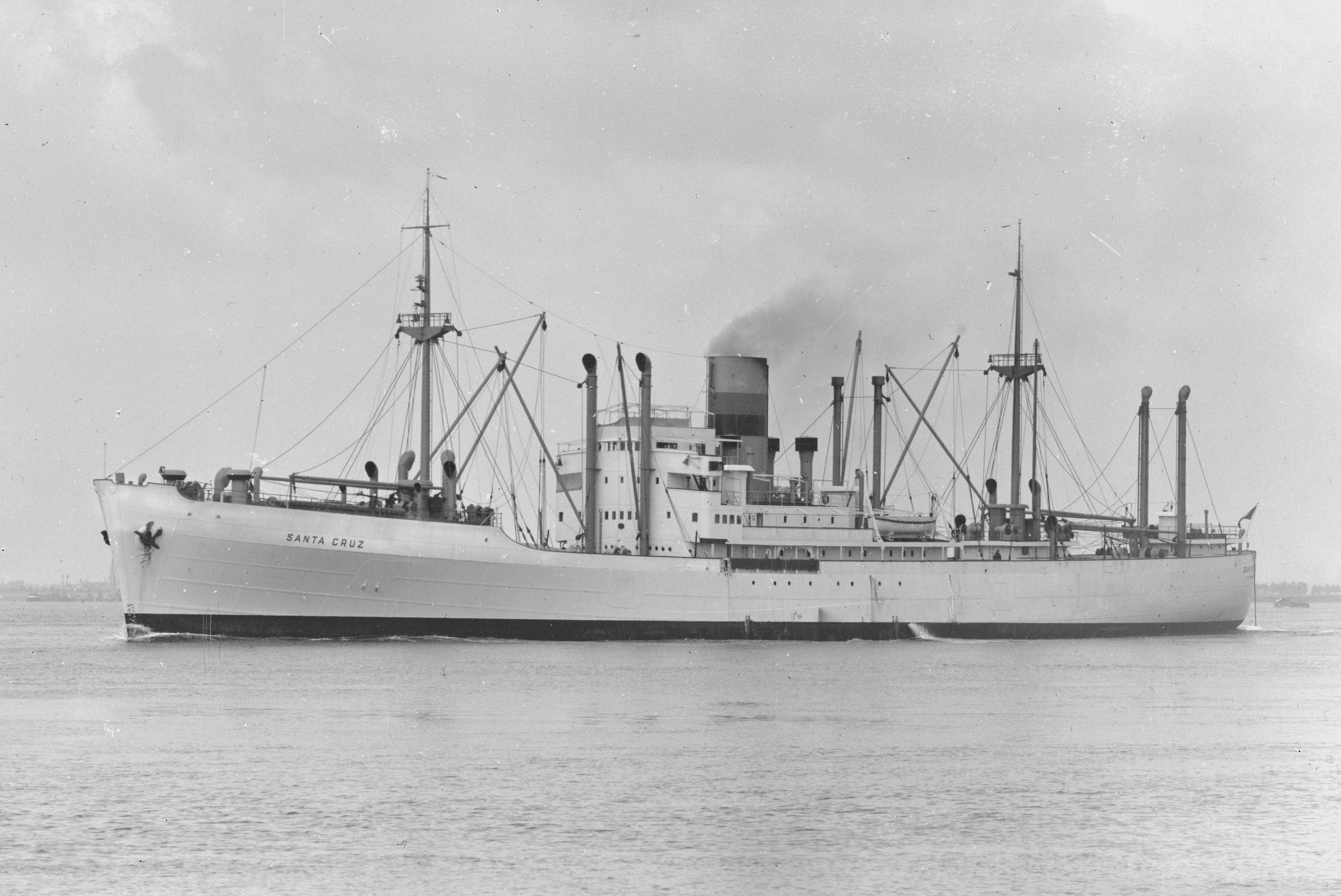
- Santa Cruz 1938–1939

History

Germany
- Name: Santa Cruz
- Operator: Oldenburg Portuguese Line (OPDR)
- Builder: Deutsche Werft, Hamburg
- Laid down: 1938
- Launched: 16 March 1938
- Home port: Hamburg
- Fate: Requisitioned by Kriegsmarine, 1939

Nazi Germany
- Name: Thor
- Namesake: Thor
- Operator: Kriegsmarine
- Yard number: 4
- Acquired: Requisitioned, 1939
- Recommissioned: March 1940
- Renamed: Thor, 1940
- Reclassified: Auxiliary cruiser, 1940
- Nickname(s): HSK-4; Schiff 10; Raider E
- Fate: Destroyed by fire in Yokohama, Japan, 30 November 1942

General characteristics
- Tonnage: 3,862 GRT
- Displacement: 9,200 GRT
- Length: 122 m (400 ft)
- Beam: 16.7 m (55 ft)
- Propulsion: Oil fired steam turbine
- Speed: 17 knots (31 km/h; 20 mph)
- Range: 40,000 nmi (74,000 km; 46,000 mi)
- Complement: 349
- Armament: * 1940; 6 × 15 cm (5.9 in) SK L/45; 2 × twin 3.7 cm (1.5 in) SK C/30; 4 × twin 2 cm (0.79 in) FlaK 30; 4 × 53.3 cm (21.0 in) torpedo tubes
- Aircraft carried: 1 Arado Ar 196 A-1

Thor (HSK 4, Schiff 10 or Raider E) was a German auxiliary cruiser of the Kriegsmarine in the Second World War, intended for service as a commerce raider. The ship was named after the Germanic deity Thor, known to the Kriegsmarine as Schiff 10 and to the British as Raider E.

Thor began its first cruise on 6 June 1940 with Captain Otto Kähler and returned via the Bay of Biscay on 23 April 1941, having spent 329 days at sea and sank or taken as prize twelve ships of 96,547 GRT. After a refit, Thor began its second cruise with a new captain Günther Gumprich. After colliding with and sinking a Swedish ore carrier and a period in dock for repairs, Thor sailed on 30 November 1941.

Thor docked at Yokohama on 9 October 1942, having sunk or captured ten ships of 55,587 GRT on a voyage of 328 days. On 30 November, the tanker Uckermark docked next to Thor and soon afterwards began to explode and set Thor on fire. Gumbrich rallied the survivors and took on the raider Michel with a composite crew.

Michel sank another three ships, then while hunting in the Pacific, Michel was torpedoed by USS Tarpon. Michel sank with the loss of Gumbrich and 262 men. Some survivors were taken back to Germany by Doggerbank, a blockade-runner that was mistakenly sunk near the Canary Islands by U-43 with only one survivor.

== Background ==
=== Commerce raiding ===
Auxiliary cruisers (raiders) were, for a small outlay in crews and material, a means of oceanic operations for the Kriegsmarine that could force the Allies into considerable counter-measures, divert ships and aircraft and inflict considerable attrition on merchant ships through sinking or capture. The Seekriegsleitung (Naval War Staff) used the experience of the First World War to convert ships into disguised auxiliary cruisers, with fairly heavy gun- and torpedo-armament and from 1942 radar. High cruising speeds of 14–18 kn (26–33 km/h; 16–21 mph) and long endurance were necessary. SKL planned to use wireless to direct raiders to different areas and to give a running commentary on circumstances by passing on wireless intelligence.

SKL strategy was to tie down and disrupt Allied sea operations, rather than obtain a high number of sinkings at the risk of the loss of raiders. Ship captains were directed to make surprise appearances, to force the Allies to divert many ships for trade protection. Tankers and supply ships were to fuel, provision and supply the raiders by exploiting the inability of the Admiralty to maintain a continuous watch over the oceans. Merchant ships, were to be taken silently by preventing them from sending distress signals. Raiders were to transfer captured merchant crews to the supply ships.

Each ship would need a crew of 284 men, six 150 mm (5.9 in)-guns, four 20 mm anti-aircraft guns, four torpedo tubes, provision for 400 mines, two seaplanes and some ships carried a light, fast E-boat for mining harbour entrances and surprise night attacks against merchant ships. The ships needed to be at sea for yearlong cruises of 40,000 nmi (74,000 km; 46,000 mi). The first raider was to sail in November 1939 but it took until 31 March 1940 before it sailed and July before the first wave had completed their departures. By March 1941 the seven raiders in action had sunk or taken 80 ships of 494,291 gross register tons (GRT).

==== B-Dienst ====
The German Beobachtungsdienst (B-Dienst, Observation Service) of the Kriegsmarine Marinenachrichtendienst (MND, Naval Intelligence Service) had broken several Admiralty codes and cyphers by 1939, which were used to help Kriegsmarine ships elude British forces and provide opportunities for surprise attacks. In 1941, B-Dienst read signals from the Commander in Chief Western Approaches informing convoys of areas patrolled by U-boats, enabling the submarines to move into "safe" zones. B-Dienst broke Naval Cypher No 3 in February 1942 and by March was reading up to 80 per cent of the traffic, which continued until 15 December 1943. By coincidence, the British could not read the Shark cypher and had no information to send in Cypher No 3 which might compromise Ultra.

== Prelude ==
=== Santa Cruz/Thor ===
The cargo ship Santa Cruz (3,863 GRT, 5,170 DWT) was 400.4 ft (122.0 m) long, with a beam of 54.6 ft (16.6 m), a draught of 23.4 ft (7.1 m) and a speed of 16 kn (30 km/h; 18 mph). The ship was built by Deutsche Werft, Hamburg, (DWH) in 1938 and was owned and operated by the Oldenburg Portuguese Line (OPDR) Hamburg. In the winter of 1939–1940 the Kriegsmarine requisitioned the ship and had DWH convert it into an auxiliary warship by DWH. The ship was commissioned as the Hilfskreuzer (commerce raider) Thor on 15 March 1940.

=== Operational Intelligence Centre ===
Pre-war thinking at the Admiralty under-estimated the threat from U-boats and expected that the principal weapon of the Kriegsmarine would be the commerce raider. Between the wars the Admiralty and the Royal Air Force had never agreed about the control of maritime aircraft or grasped the role and effectiveness of aircraft over the seas, their strategy and tactics or their design and armament. In 1939 the Germans could only reach the high seas via the Scotland–Iceland gap or the Denmark Strait between Iceland and Greenland. The Admiralty revived the Northern Patrol to intercept Blockade runners and detect the passage of German Deutschland-class cruisers (pocket battleships) that had been built as commerce raiders. (Note: Deutschland, Admiral Scheer and Admiral Graf Spee) In late 1940 the Operational Intelligence Centre created a sub-section to concentrate on armed merchant raiders to collect information that a raider was at sea based on ship disappearances, survivor reports on the appearances of raiders, their tactics and armaments, the presence of mines and the analysis of times and distances to infer the number of raiders.

As the presence of a raider was established it received a code letter, beginning with Raider A. It was discovered that the Germans named the ships and gave them a number (Thor [Raider E] was Schiff 10). From May 1941 a supplement of the Weekly Intelligence Report listed raiders, their size, speed, armament, captain, drawings or photographs their characteristics, tactics and a digest of their cruises. The wireless signal QQQQ (Q is --.- in Morse code) was established for attacks by merchant raiders to go with RRR (R is .-.) for attack by any ship and SSS (S is ...) for submarine attack. In May 1941 the cruiser HMS Cornwall intercepted a distress message from a tanker in the Indian Ocean that led to the sinking of Raider F (Pinguin Schiff 33) that had been at sea for close to a year, sank or took as Prize of war 17 ships and 11 whalers of 136,000 GRT. The seven raiders at sea between April 1940 and November 1941 sank or took as prizes 87 ships of over 600,000 GRT.

== First cruise ==
=== June 1940 ===
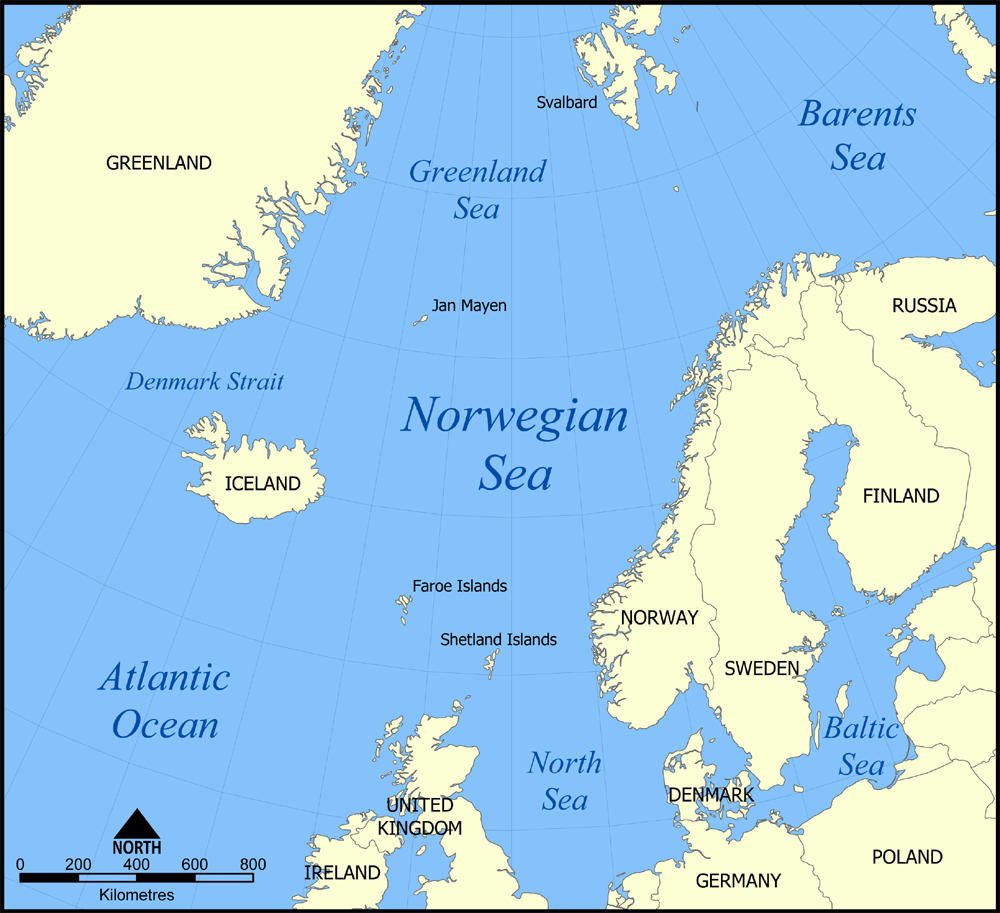
Map showing the Norwegian Sea and the Denmark Strait

Thor (Captain Otto Kähler) began its first cruise on 6 June 1940, altered to look like the Russian freighter Orsk from Odessa. The ship was escorted into the North Sea by destroyers, minesweepers and aircraft. The British and French were evacuating troops from Harstad in the north of Norway, after the failure of the Norwegian campaign (8 April – 10 June 1940) and had a lot of ships in the area. As the ship sailed northwards, the weather deteriorated, enveloping the ship in fog and snow, despite the midnight sun and it passed unseen. Thor/Orsk passed through the Denmark Strait and reached the North Atlantic on 16 June. On 22 June, Kähler reported to Berlin that Thor was west of the Azores and had changed disguise to the neutral Vir a Jugoslavian ship from Split.

=== July 1940 ===
On 1 July, Thor/Vir, met the 9,289 GRT Dutch cargo ship Kertosono, which was carrying a cargo of petrol, timber, asphalt and agricultural machinery. Kähler decided to send it under a prize crew to Lorient in France, where it arrived on 12 July. On 7 July, just south of the Equator, Thor encountered Delambre, a British 7,030 GRT freighter carrying hides and cotton to Britain. Delambre turned away leading to a stern chase and when Thor had closed the range to about 8,000 yd (7,300 m) several broadsides, were fired, the third of which hit Delambre and stopped it. A boarding party took the crew of 44 and a passenger prisoner and scuttled the ship with demolition charges.

The Equator
(interactive map)

Two days later on 9 July, Thor intercepted the Belgian freighter Bruges, bound for Freetown with 7,000 long tons (7,100 t) of wheat. Bruges was scuttled and its crew of 44 was taken aboard Thor. On 14 July, Thor stopped Gracefield, another British freighter, carrying 7,000 long tons (7,100 t) of wheat and bran from Montevideo. The 36-man crew was taken prisoner and two torpedoes were fired at the ship, one hit and the other circled the ship until it ran out of fuel; the ship was sunk by gunfire.

On 16 July Thor spotted a large plume of smoke from the British freighter Wendover (5,489 GRT) carrying coal to Buenos Aires. Thor approached by hiding in the smoke plume and opened fire without warning, as Wendover was seen to have two guns at the stern. Wendover was hit by several shells and set on fire. The wireless operator began sending "QQQQ" and a crewman was seen running towards the guns at the stern. Another salvo hit the wireless cabin, killed the operator and with the fires spreading, the captain stopped the ship. Kahler sent a boarding party over that set demolition charges. Wendover capsized when the charges detonated, then was finished off by gunfire. Two members of the crew were killed in the attack, 37 were taken prisoner, two of whom were mortally wounded and died on board Thor, being buried at sea.

The Dutch freighter Tela, carrying 5,451 long tons (5,538 t) of grain to Britain was intercepted on 17 July, Thor firing a shot across its bow and it stopped without sending distress signals. The crew of 33 men abandoned ship and were taken aboard Thor, the ship being sunk with demolition charges. In just over two weeks Thor had sunk six ships of 35,201 GRT and taken 194 prisoners. For ten days Thor stayed in the south Atlantic off the Brazilian coast. The prisoners were roused at 6:00 a.m. for roll call at 6:00 a.m. then after breakfast, shifts of 60–70 came on deck for sun, exercise and fresh air.

==== Alcantara ====
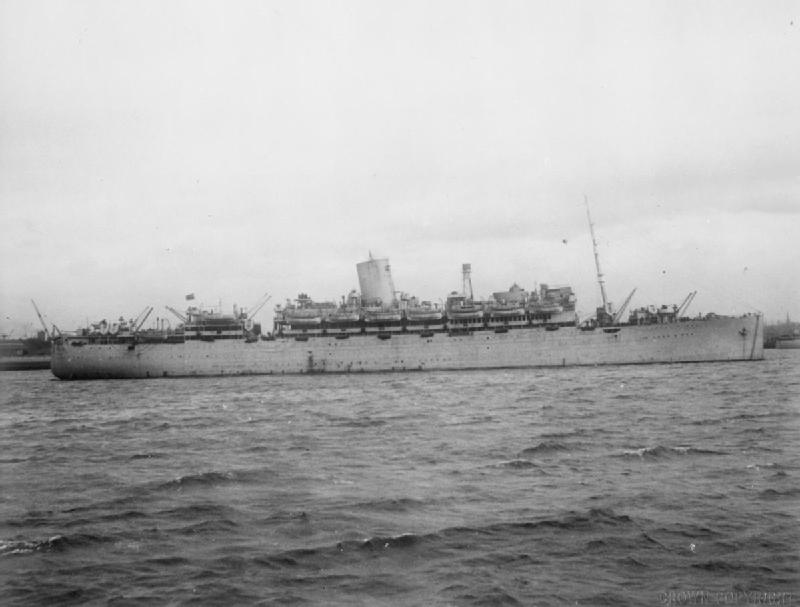
The armed merchant cruiser HMS Alcantara

On 28 July, Thor encountered a grey-painted ship that was hard to identify and eavesdropped on a wireless message reporting Thor and calling for help. The ship was the armed merchant cruiser HMS Alcantara, with a main armament of eight BL 6-inch Mk XII naval guns (150 mm) two 3-inch guns and sundry anti-aircraft guns. Admiral Henry Harwood, the commander of the South American Division, North America and West Indies Station, had reacted to the number of overdue ships and Admiralty signals intelligence that raiders were operating in the South Atlantic. Using reports of survivors, Harwood inferred that a raider was moving southwards and sent Alcantara to search for it. At about 9:00 a.m. on 28 July, off Argentina, on a clear day with a calm sea, lookouts on Alcantara spotted a strange ship that turned away at high speed, arousing the suspicions of the captain, James Ingham.

Alcantara was capable of 19 kn (35 km/h; 22 mph), 2 kn (3.7 km/h; 2.3 mph) faster than Thor and at about 2:00 p.m., when the range was about 17,350 yd (15,860 m) Kähler decided to try to inflict enough damage on Alcantara to escape. Thor gained three early hits on Alcantara, one between the bridge and funnel, a second aft and a third on the waterline that caused flooding in the engine room, forcing Alcantara to reduce speed. Alacantara replied with its 6-inch guns but was out-ranged by about 2,000 yd (1,800 m) and facing the sun, making it harder to aim. After the fire control system was damaged, the gunners had to fire independently. Despite the difficulties, Thor was hit several times, one shell passing unexploded through the hull and damaging a shell hoist; another shell hit the boat deck and put the torpedo fire control system out of action. Using its reserve W/T, Alcantara sent "Enemy approximately 8,000 tons, speed 19 knots, armament four 5.9-inch guns". Thor turned away from Alcantara, that had lost speed due to the shell-damage and instead of fighting on, Thor escaped under a smokescreen and changed disguise once out of sight.

=== August–September 1940 ===
After the battle with Alcantara, the crew of Thor repaired the damage, cleaned boilers and changed their disguise. Thor rendezvoused with the supply ship SS Rekum on 25 August and then returned to Brazilian waters. Two weeks later, on 8 September, the Yugoslav SS Federico Glavic was stopped but allowed to proceed unmolested, as a neutral. On 26 September the Arado float plane that Thor carried, discovered the Norwegian whale-oil tanker SS Kosmos (17,801 GRT) that was carrying over 17,000 long tons (17,000 t) of whale oil. Kosmos would have been a highly valuable prize but the fact that she was short of fuel, slow and easily recognisable, meant that taking it as a prize was impractical and Kähler ordered it sunk by gunfire.

=== October 1940 ===
On 8 October Thor caught the 8,715 GRT British reefer Natia. Thor achieved a direct hit, which stopped Natia, though she continued wireless transmissions. Thor hit Natia seven or eight more times with gunfire and a torpedo that tore open its side. Another 35 rounds were fired before she sank. One crewman was killed and 84 crew (one mortally wounded) were taken aboard Thor, bringing its total of prisoners to 368. Most of the prisoners were transferred to the supply ship Rio Grande in mid November.

=== December 1940 ===
==== Carnarvon Castle ====
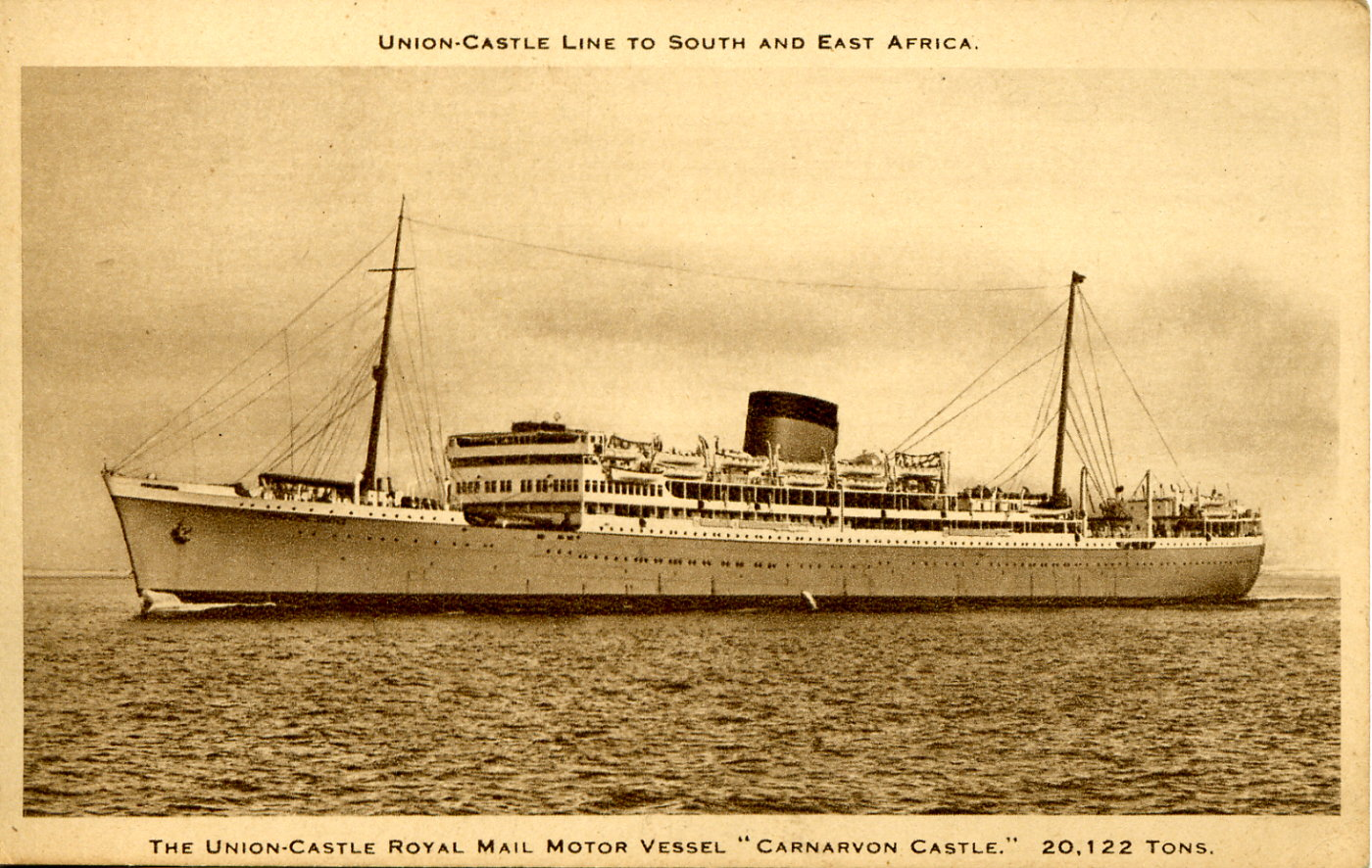
Pre-war postcard of MV Carnarvon Castle

On 5 December, at 5:30 a.m., south-east of Rio de Janeiro, Thor encountered another armed merchant cruiser, HMS Carnarvon Castle (20,062 GRT) armed with eight 6-inch guns, four on each side, two 3-inch anti-aircraft guns and various light weapons. Three of the four 15 cm (5.91 in) guns on Thor were aft and Kähler decided to force Carnarvon Castle into a stern chase. At 7:01 a.m. Carnarvon Castle fired a shot that fell 300 yd (270 m) short, Thor raised the German ensign and began a turning engagement, both ships trying to manoeuvre to get the sun in the opponent's eyes, that lasted for about half an hour at a range of 7,000–8,000 yd (6,400–7,300 m). Thor made as much smoke as possible and fired two torpedoes that missed. The gunners on Thor obtained five hits, started three fires and knocked out the fire control system, leaving the British gun crews to fire independently.

Thor was a much smaller target and received no hits. At 8:05 a.m. having been hit eight times, Carnarvon Castle turned away, dropped smoke floats and headed for Montevideo in Uruguay for repairs, with six crew killed and 32 wounded. Thor suffered several gun-jammings through overheating but these could be repaired as Thor sailed south at speed, to avoid British ships that Kähler expected to join the search. Over 67 per cent of the ammunition for the main guns had been fired and much fuel expended, replenished by Eurofeld on 21 December. A search to find Thor by the cruisers HMS Cumberland, Enterprise and Newcastle failed. Thor was ordered to rendezvous with the German pocket battleship Admiral Scheer to transfer men for prize crews for whalers taken as prizes by Pinguin. The ships met on 25 December with the British reefer ship Duquesa, a prize taken by Admiral Scheer and the tanker Nordmark.

=== February–March 1941 ===
In February Thor was fuelled by the tanker MV Eurofeld and again in March by MV Alsterufer, then rendezvoused with ten whalers captured by Pinguin. Early in March Thor was to the south-west of the Cape Verde islands to intercept ships avoiding U-boats to the east of the islands. On 25 March Thor intercepted Britannia, an 8,800 GRT British passenger ship. After scoring several hits on the ship, Kähler allowed time for it to be abandoned, intending to sink the ship and recover the passengers and crew. The wireless operator informed him of a signal from another ship intended for Britannia and that the ship was about 100 nmi (190 km; 120 mi) distant and on the way. Kähler estimated he had four or five hours to escape, time that was needed to rescue the survivors. When the lifeboats and rubber rafts were away from Britannia, shells were fired into the liner's hull at the waterline, Britannia sinking in flames.

Kähler expected that the British warship would arrive soon and rescue them and did not want survivors clearly seeing Thor to give a description to the Royal Navy. Kähler spoke to the crew who did not want people left behind in a shark zone. Kähler sent a signal to SKL that five hundred people were adrift, hoping that his message would be broadcast in clear and be picked up by other vessels but the message was not sent, only one man was picked up by Thor. One of the lifeboats sailed for 23 days over 1,500 nmi (2,800 km; 1,700 mi) and reached Sao Luis in Brazil. The Spanish vessels SS Cabo de Hornos, SS Raranga and SS Bachi, passing through by coincidence, rescued 331 people. On 29 March Kähler received a message from Cabo de Hornos that it had rescued 79 people from Britannia and that hundreds of people might be adrift. The supposed cruiser that sent the message was never identified and 195 people died in the disaster. On the same day Thor stopped the 5,045 GRT Swedish MV Trollenholm. Though neutral, the ship had been chartered by the British to take coal from Newcastle to Port Said. The 31 crewmen were quickly transferred to Thor and the freighter was sunk with demolition charges.

=== 4–16 April 1941 ===
==== Voltaire ====
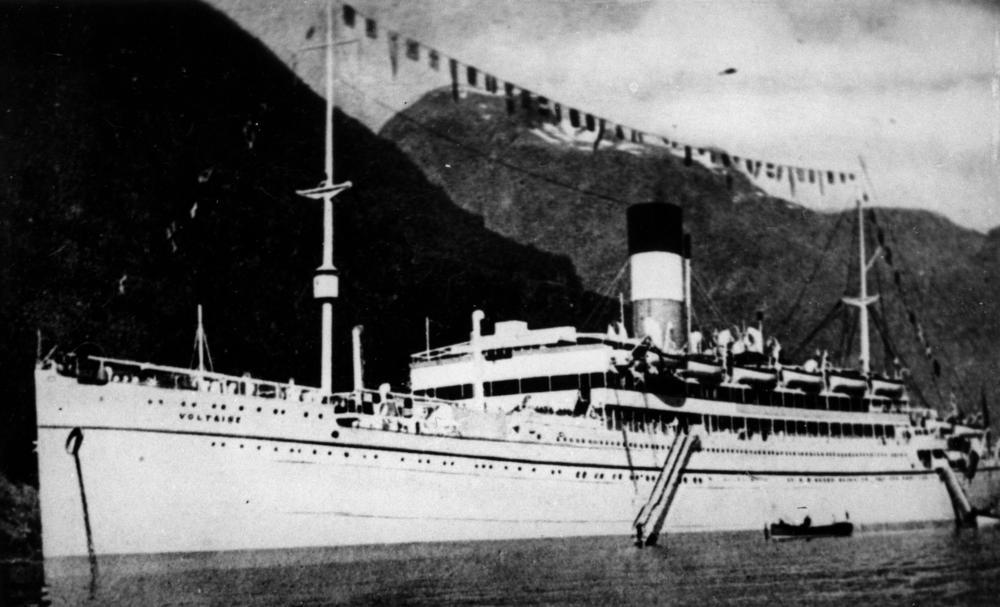
The armed merchant cruiser Voltaire in its former guise as a Lamport and Holt Ltd passenger liner. In April 1941 it was sunk by Thor off Cape Verde.

On the return journey to Germany, just after dawn, Thor, under a Greek flag, encountered HMS Voltaire (13,302 GRT) an armed merchant cruiser, about 900 nmi (1,700 km; 1,000 mi) west of Cape Verde. Voltaire carried eight 6 in (150 mm) and three 3 in (76 mm) guns. Thor approached head-on and to AAA signals (a demand for a ship captain to identify his ship) from Voltaire fired a warning shot. The first salvo from Thor hit Voltaire in the generator and wireless cabin, rendering it unable to transmit signals. Voltaire replied but with the electrical circuits out of action its guns had to be worked individually. Voltaire managed a hit on Thor, disabling the wireless aerial. Voltaire's obsolete guns overheated and had to cease firing, at which point Voltaire was at 7,000 yd (6,400 m) circling at 12 kn (22 km/h; 14 mph) ablaze and with a jammed rudder.

At a range of 2,000 yd (1,800 m) Thor prepared to launch torpedoes but men could be seen jumping into the water, Thor ceased fire and men on the poop deck waved improvised white flags. Kähler laid off at 4,000 yd (3,700 m) and began taking on survivors. The Germans in their boats stood ready to fend off sharks with rifles and machine-guns. Having disabled the wireless on Voltaire, Kähler felt safe to concentrate on the rescue for five hours. The captain and 196 men were rescued out of the 296 crew; the ship sank at 14°25′N, 40°40′W. Thor sailed north-west and transferred 170 prisoners to the tanker Ill on 14 April. On 16 April, on the return voyage to Germany, Thor encountered the Swedish ore carrier Sir Ernest Cassel (7,738 GRT). Two warning shots were fired, the ship stopped and the crew was taken aboard Thor; demolition charges were used to scuttle the ship at 32°N, 35°W. On 23 April Thor reached the Bay of Biscay, having spent 329 days at sea, sinking or capturing twelve ships of 96,547 GRT.

== Second cruise ==
=== November 1941 – January 1942 ===
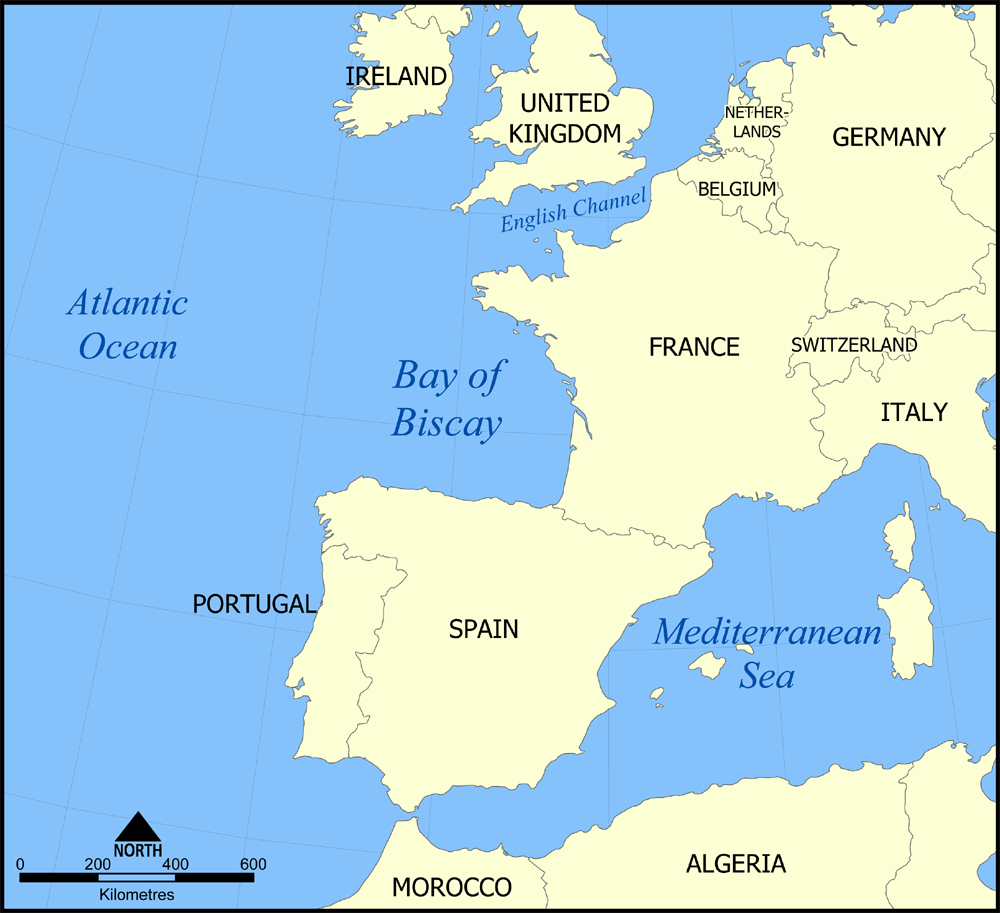
The Bay of Biscay.

When Thor refitted, newer guns and a radar set were installed. A new captain, Kapitän zur See Günther Gumprich took nearly fifty of the crew from the first cruise. (Note: The Empire of Japan had entered the war on 7–8 December and Germany had declared war on the United States on 11 December.) On 20 November, Thor sailed and collided in fog with Bothnia (1,343 GRT) a Swedish ore carrier, anchored off Brunsbüttel, that sank quickly with no casualties. Thor returned to dry dock in Kiel for repairs to its bow. The second cruise recommenced on 30 November 1941 and Thor sailed down the French coast. Storms delayed its passage through the Bay of Biscay until 14 January when it entered the Atlantic and turned south for Antarctica, looking for whalers. Thor was to relieve Kormoran (HSK 8, Raider G to the British) in the Indian Ocean.

=== February–March 1942 ===
Thor voyaged into the Southern Ocean and crossed the Antarctic Circle on 25 February. The area was searched with the Arado for the whaling fleet. Wireless transmissions suggested that whalers were operating in the vicinity but nothing was found. After a few days Thor turned north towards the South Atlantic shipping lanes. In the twilight of 23 March, lookouts spotted smoke, thought to be Regensburg that was due to rendezvous with Thor but it turned out to be the Greek freighter Pagasitikos (3,490 GRT). To save the crew, the captain stopped as ordered and did not send a sighting report, Thirty-two men and a woman were taken prisoner and the ship sunk with a torpedo. On 24 March Regensburg appeared about 1,000 nmi (1,900 km; 1,200 mi) west of the Orange River and Thor replenished; Regensburg then circled Thor for the radar operators to practice. On 28 March, Thor chased a ship for three hours, after lookouts saw masts on the horizon but the ship was too fast to catch up and the Arado was not used.

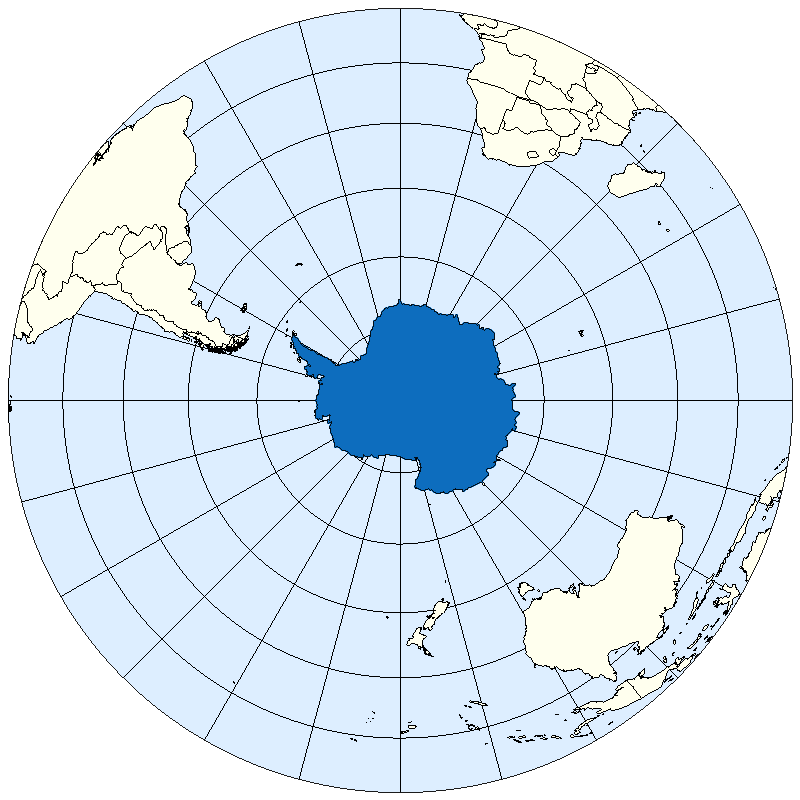
Antarctica (in blue)

Late in the morning of 30 March, about 700 nmi (1,300 km; 810 mi) south-west of St Helena, the Arado crew reported that a British ship was steaming parallel to Thor over starboard horizon. Gumprich increased speed on a converging course with the British freighter Wellpark (4,470 GRT) carrying military equipment from St John's to Alexandria. The crew of Wellpark were unawares until 1:00 p.m. when Thor drew near. The captain ordered a close watch to be kept on the ship as it converged and tried to identify it. Just after 3:00 p.m. the Arado took off and the Wellpark captain ordered the anti-aircraft gunners to action stations on the 12-pounder gun. The Arado trailing a wire with hooks flew close and the pilot opened fire with its two 20 mm cannon; the Wellpark gunners replying. After hitting the bridge, the Arado dragged its line across the aerial mast, taking away the aerial. The Arado crew and the ship gunners continued to exchange fire until Thor came close enough to use its guns, penetrating Wellpark just above the waterline and near the boiler room. Wellpark came to a stop after fifteen minutes, seven men having been killed; once the 41 survivors were taken prisoner, the ship was sunk by gunfire.

=== April 1942 ===
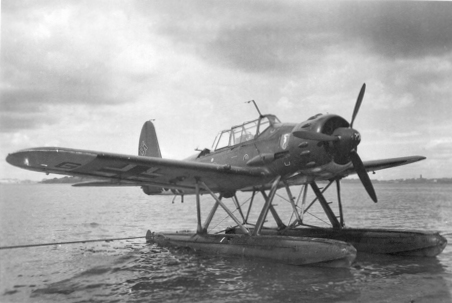
Example of an Arado 196 similar to that carried by Thor

On 1 April Thor intercepted the British 4,565 GRT Willesden about 475 nmi (880 km; 547 mi) west south-west of St Helena, from New York bound for Alexandria. Gumprich stalked the ship for twelve hours and then the Arado demolished the wireless aerials with its grapnel and dropped two bombs. The gunners on Thor fired 128 shells that set fire to the deck cargo of oil drums and destroyed the bridge. Willesden returned fire but managed only six shells; with one dead and six wounded (four mortally) the ship was abandoned and 42 of the crew were taken prisoner. Thor sank the ship with a torpedo. On 3 April the Norwegian freighter Aust (5,630 GRT) fell victim to the same tactics and was unable to send a wireless signal before being hit by gunfire and brought to a stop by the crew, that abandoned the vessel. A boarding party inspected the ship and sank it by demolition charge, taking the crew prisoner. From 23 March to 9 April, Thor sank five ships of 23,623 GRT).

On 10 April Thor detected the 4,840 GRT British tramp steamer Kirkpool, bound for Montevideo from Durban, on the radar set, installed during the refit. Having followed the ship all day in poor visibility, with night falling, Gumprich closed in and opened fire with the 15 cm (5.91 in) guns. The second salvo obtained three hits and set Kirkpool's bridge and wheelhouse on fire. With the helm unattended, the ship veered, in what from Thor looked like a ramming attempt. With the ship on fire, the captain ordered the crew to abandon ship and Kirkpool sank as the crew jumped overboard. Sixteen men were lost even though Thor lingered for three hours looking for survivors, helped by the red lights on new life jackets being issued to British merchant ship crews; 30 men were rescued, including Kirkpool's captain, chief engineer and first officer. The ship was sunk with a torpedo. Soon afterwards, Thor was ordered into the Indian Ocean by SKL, with a warning to be aware of Japanese submarines operating in the area. SKL hoped that the raider could continue its run of success, obtained in under a month, with attacks near the Cape of Good Hope shipping lanes; five ships had been sunk for a total of 23,176 GRT.

=== May 1942 ===
Map of the Indian Ocean

On 10 May the Arado sighted a ship but uncertain of its identity, took photographs, because Thor was due to rendezvous with a tanker and Michel, another raider, was operating in the area. The photographs were inconclusive and the Arado was sent back. The new photographs still precluded identification and Gumprich decided not to attack. Soon after this sighting Thor received orders to move into the Indian Ocean, having sunk five ships. On 22 April, Thor entered the Indian Ocean, naval headquarters having arranged an area in the south-east Indian Ocean for Thor with the Japanese, to keep away from Japanese submarines operating off the east African coast. Sailing eastwards, Thor had no sightings until 4 May but this was the supply ship MV Regensburg that transferred supplies and took on 162 prisoners.

On 10 May, the Arado crew spotted a big ship 1,500 nmi (2,800 km; 1,700 mi) off the west of Australia, the 7,130 GRT Australian ocean liner Nankin, en route to Bombay with 350 passengers and crew. The Arado was spotted and the crew began practising lifeboat drills. At 2:35 p.m. the Arado was spotted again on the port side and Captain Stratford ordered a turn to starboard to avoid a torpedo attack, Thor being on the starboard side of the ship. The Arado strafed Nankin as it overflew with its grappling line out but missed the wireless aerial. Stratford ordered best speed to try to outrun the ship and had the crew prepare to scuttle Nankin in case the other ship was faster. The Arado came round for another strafing and grappling run and was met by return fire from the ship's machine-gun and small-arms fire from the passengers (23 were army and navy personnel and armed) and crew.

The wireless officer was sending continuous distress signals that Thor found difficult to jam, because the operator on Nankin kept changing frequency. At 2:38 p.m. Thor came into range and from 13,000 yd (12,000 m) opened fire with three its 15 cm (5.91 in) guns, that fell short. The stern gun of Nankin returned fire and during a stern chase neither side managed a hit for 22 minutes, both crews over-firing their boilers for maximum speed as the Arado kept trying to bring down the aerial and the armed personnel on Nankin tried to shoot it down. At 3:00 p.m. Thor managed to hit Nankin several times and blew a hole in the hull. Stratford realised that this was the end, ordered the crew to cease fire and sounded the abandon ship alarm. The last wireless signal was,

Nankin abandoning ship Latitude 26 degrees 43' South, 89 degrees 47' East.

and the crew dropped the confidential books and records over the side inside a perforated box and tried to scuttle Nankin. Thor rescued the crew and passengers from their lifeboats. A prize crew boarded Nankin and managed to repair the ship's engines that the attempt to scuttle had not severely damaged. The hole in Nankin was repaired and frozen food, wool and wireless equipment taken aboard Thor, some of which were put aboard Regensburg when it arrived, along with the prisoners. The supply ship and Nankin (now Leuthen) sailed to Japanese-held ports. Nankin was carrying secret papers from the New Zealand Combined Intelligence Centre in Wellington to the C-in-C, Eastern Fleet in Colombo. This information revealed that the Allies were reading some Japanese radio codes but its transfer to Japan was delayed until the beginning of July.

=== June 1942 ===
There were no encounters for a month and then on 14 June Thor got a radar contact at about 10,000 yd (4.9 nmi). On a converging course, Thor was able to approach to within 1,800 yd (1,600 m), Thor attacked what turned out to be the 6,310 GRT Dutch Shell tanker Olivia. It was too dark for the Arado and Gumprich tried to put the wireless transmitter out of action with gunfire but the bombardment killed most of the crew and turned the ship into "a floating wall of flame". The steering was damaged and the ship began to circle. The third officer, three Dutch and eight Chinese crewmen were able to lower a boat but searchers from Thor was able to find only one man, J. D. Fischer, in the water. The lifeboat drifted for weeks before the boat capsized in the breakers off Madagascar; one Dutch and seven Chinese mariners died before reaching land on 13 July. On 19 June, Thor intercepted the Norwegian oil tanker Herborg (7,894 GRT). The Arado disabled the wireless aerial as warning shots from Thor brought Herborg to a stop, with only one 3-inch gun Herborg was no match for the raider. The captain ordered the ship stopped and the crew to abandon ship. The crew was taken aboard Thor and a prize crew took the renamed Hohenfriedburg to Japan, arriving on 7 July. On 4 July Thor stopped another Norwegian oil tanker, the 5,895 GRT Madrono, in the same manner as Herborg. The renamed Rossbach was taken to Japan by a prize crew, arriving on 5 August. . (Note: Rossbach was torpedoed and sunk by the American submarine USS Burrfish, at 33°14′N, 134°40′E in the Kii Channel, Japan, in May 1944.)

On 20 July, the British reefer ship Indus was attacked and Captain Bryan ordered that the ship be turned away from Thor at full speed, firing its stern gun. At 3:00 p.m. after firing two rounds, the stern gun was hit by a shell from Thor, killing the chief gunner and destroying the gun. The wireless operator on Indus sent distress signals, that were replied to by shore stations until another shell from Thor hit the bridge, set it ablaze, killed him and knocked out the wireless. Most of the crew came on deck, only to be killed in the shell explosions. When the ship slowed and the wireless stopped transmitting, Gumbrich ceased fire. Indus was burning so badly that a party was not put aboard; 49 survivors were rescued but about half of the crew had been killed by the bombardment and the fire. Thor transferred its prisoners to the blockade runner Tannenfels and made for the Yokohama in Japan, via Batavia (now Jakarta) in the Japanese-occupied Dutch East Indies.

== Yokohama ==
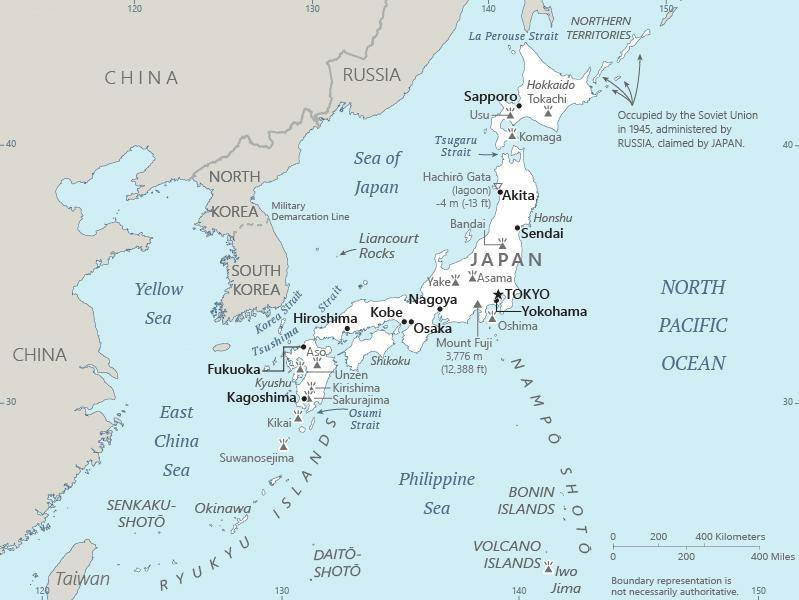
Map of Japan, showing Yokohama

Thor reached Yokohama on 9 October 1942 and Gumbrich made energetic representations to the Japanese authorities to work quickly on a refit. Much of the work was complete when on 30 November, the tanker Uckermark entered harbour and docked next to Thor. At about 2:00 p.m. an explosion within Uckermark was heard, soon followed by more explosions. The third explosion was so big that the bridge was blown into the air and landed on Thor, spreading the fire as crewmen leapt overboard and swam away from the fire that was spreading on the water.

Nankin/Leuthen and the Japanese freighter, Unkai Maru 3, also caught fire. Gumprich was in a motorboat and rescued as many men as possible until forced to retreat before the flames. The four ships were destroyed in the fire and thirteen crew of Thor and 53 of Uckermarck were killed, along with an unknown number of Chinese and Japanese dockworkers. On its second cruise, Thor had sunk or took as prize, ten ships of 55,587 GRT on a voyage of 328 days; the total for both cruises was 22 ships of 152,134 GRT.

== Voyage of MV Michel ==
The captain of Michel, Kapitän zur See Helmuth von Ruckteschell had asked to be relieved due to ill health and on 1 May 1943, Michel sailed for the Indian Ocean on its second raiding voyage, with Gumbrich as captain. The crew was a composite of survivors from Thor and the crew of Michel that Gumbrich drilled daily to integrate his survivors with the Michel crew. (Note: In its first voyage of 358 days, Michel had sunk fifteen ships for a total of 99,386 GRT.) On 14 June 1943, the 7,715 GRT MV Hoegh Silverdawn was spotted by the Arado and caught by Michel late in the evening. In 45 minutes Hoegh Silverdawn was sunk at 25°40′S, 92°E, 36 passengers and crew were killed and 22 survived, three having got away on a raft and being picked up by a US merchant ship a week later. Captain E. Waaler, in a lifeboat with another 21 people, survived a journey of 31 days and 2,860 nmi (5,300 km; 3,290 mi) to make landfall in India, two survivors having died during the voyage.

On 17 June, MV Ferncastle, a 9,940 GRT tanker was quickly sunk by four torpedoes at 25°S, 97°E. Eighteen men were killed and nineteen survivors were rescued from the crew of thirty-seven. Some of the crew managed to escape and were rescued by a ship. The next three months were uneventful apart from a near miss with a US cruiser. Gumprich sailed into the Pacific assuming that the escapees would have alerted the Allies. Michel was limited to the fuel it carried because all of the German supply tankers had been sunk and the Japanese were too hard pressed to help. He would soon have to give up the cruise and head back to Japan. Michel was in the vicinity of Easter Island on 10 September when the tanker MV India (9,977 GRT) was spotted in the afternoon. Michel hung back until dark and attacked without warning. Almost immediately the ship burst into flames so hot that boats from Michel could not approach to search for survivors and the 38 members of the crew were killed.

During the night of 29/30 September, Michel was suddenly surrounded by ships. Gumprich gradually extricated the ship from the convoy, having been deterred from making an attack by nearby destroyers. (Note: Michel might have blundered into a US Navy Task Force.) While heading for Tokyo Bay, on the night of 16 October in bright moonlight, in a calm sea, Michel was spotted by the submarine USS Tarpon. Commander Thomas L. Wogan mistook the ship for a Japanese freighter and just past midnight, fired four torpedoes two of which hit the ship. Hundreds of men, including all the Norwegian prisoners, were killed in the first minutes as water flooded the hull. Watertight doors were closed and Michel began firing all round, not being able to see the attacker. Several more torpedoes were fired, one hit the stern and another hit the site of the first torpedo impact. Michel, listing to port, began to sink by the stern.

Gumprich gave the order to abandon ship and he was seen on the bridge, directing the evacuation of the wounded. Some survivors reached the shore and several were picked up by passing Japanese boats but the Japanese Navy did little to help; fifteen officers and 248 crewmen were killed. Only after the war did the Allies discover that the ship was Michel, the last of the German commerce raiders. Some survivors of the ship were sent to France on the blockade runner Doggerbank and killed when the ship was mistakenly sunk by U-43 on 3 March 1943, 1,000 nmi (1,900 km; 1,200 mi) west of the Canary Islands, only one of the 365 crew survived. (Note: Fritz Kürt was rescued by the Spanish tanker Campoamor; Kürt was the last man of fifteen who had survived the sinking of Doggerbank and got on board a Japanese life raft.)

== Aftermath ==
=== Analysis ===
Thor was capable of 17 kn (31 km/h; 20 mph) and completed two voyages, a feat unequalled by the other raiders. Thor sank eighteen ships and took four ships as prizes in 653 days at sea and defeated three Armed Merchant Cruisers of the Royal Navy. In 2001 Werner Rahn wrote that in eleven voyages from April 1940 to October 1943, nine auxiliary cruisers sank or took as prizes 138 ships of 857,533 GRT. Twenty-three of the prizes of 128,550 GRT reached Axis ports in France or Japan. The light cruiser HMAS Sydney was sunk and many merchant ships were damaged by mines. The great success (650,000 GRT) achieved until the end of 1941, surprised SKL and was almost double that achieved by conventional warships in the Atlantic. The weakness of the Kriegsmarine meant that auxiliary cruisers were an efficient alternative but after their success in the First World War, more use could have been made of them.

Before the war, Admiral Erich Raeder, Commander-in-Chief of the German Navy, had wanted a fleet of battleships and aircraft carriers but his plans were overtaken by events. Raeder had to rely on U-boats and armed and camouflaged merchant vessels. In the 1930s the Kriegsmarine had paid Central American banana plantations to have fruit ships built by German companies that could quickly be adapted for wartime use. Banana boats were faster than most other merchant ships and because they were small and sat low in the water, they offered a small target. Raider crews raised and lowered masts and funnels and altered their silhouettes with dummy bows and structures. Raider crews pumped fuel from front to back and side to side, exposing parts of the hull above the waterline for painting in different colours. The raiders carried guns large enough to match all but the largest warships, hidden behind the fake structures.

Raiders sailed the oceans, appearing innocuous to other ships. Only when the German naval ensign was run up and the guns were unmasked, too late to flee did the target realise the danger, often the wireless operator had no time to signal a warning. Raiders tried to take ships as prizes and send them home or loot the cargo of food and fuel, before sinking the ship. The raiders usually tried to capture ships with the minimum of trouble and when crews and passengers were captured they were usually well treated. Prisoners ate the same food as the Germans and were allowed on deck for exercise and fresh air. Doctors looked after sick and injured prisoners the same as they did their crews. When taken aboard a raider, prisoners were searched for weapons and confiscated items were listed on a receipt and usually returned when they departed.

== War record ==
Career of Thor/Schiff 10/Raider E
Ship	Sunk	Prize	GRT	Cruises	Fate	Notes
Thor	18	4	152,134	2/653 days	Fire	Destroyed in Yokohama Port after adjoining tanker Uckermark caught fire

== Ships sunk or taken as prizes ==
=== First voyage ===
Merchant ships sunk
Ship	Year	Flag	GRT	Date	Pos'n	Notes
SS Delambre	1917	Merchant Navy	7,032	7 July 1940	04°W, 26°W	
SS Bruges	1904	Belgium	4,983	9 July 1940	10°59′N, 23°54′W	
SS Gracefield	1928	Merchant Navy	4,613	14 July 1940	13°S, 31°W	
SS Wendover	1928	Merchant Navy	5,489	16 July 1940	23°S, 35°W	4† 37 pow
SS Tela	1911	Netherlands	3,777	17 July 1940	12°S, 33°W	33 pow
SS Kosmos	1929	Norway	17,801	26 September 1940	00°26′S, 32°01′W	Whaling factory ship
SS Natia	1920	Merchant Navy	8,715	8 October 1940	00°50′N, 32°34′W	Reefer 2†, 84 pow
SS Britannia	1926	Merchant Navy	6,800	25 Mar 1941	07°24′N, 34°03′W	Troopship, 249†, 233 surv
MV Trolleholm	1922	Sweden	5,047	25 March 1941	—	0†

=== Warships ===
Ship sunk
Ship	Year	Flag	Type	Date	Pos'n	Notes
HMS Voltaire	1923	Royal Navy	Armed merchant cruiser	2 April 1941	14°30′N, 40°30′W	75†, 197 surv

==== First voyage prizes ====
First voyage
Ship	Year	Flag	GRT	Date	Pos'n	Notes
SS Kertosono	1918	Netherlands	9,289	1 July 1940	12°40′N, 31°22′W	Prize, to Lorient, arr. 12 July

=== Second voyage ===
Merchant ships sunk
Ship	Year	Flag	GRT	Date	Pos'n	Notes
SS Sir Ernest Cassel	1910	Sweden	7,739	16 April 1941	32°N, 35°W	0†
SS Pagasitikos	1914	Greece	3,942	23 March 1942	31°S, 11°35′W	†0
SS Wellpark	1938	Merchant Navy	4,649	28 March 1942	25°S, 10°W	7†, 41 pow
SS Willesden	1925	Merchant Navy	4,563	1 Apr 1942	16°00′S, 16°00′W	5†, 42 pow
SS Aust	1920	Norway	5,626	3 Apr 1942	20°S, 16°W	Thor, scuttled, all pow (Note: Aust was attacked by the aircraft carried by Thor.)
SS Kirkpool	1928	Merchant Navy	4,842	10 Apr 1942	33°S, 07°W	
SS Olivia	1939	Netherlands	6,307	14 Jun 1942	26°S, 77°E	42†, 6 surv
MV Indus	1940	Merchant Navy	5,187	20 July 1942	26°44′E, 82°50′E	23†

==== Second voyage prizes ====
Second voyage
Ship	Year	Flag	GRT	Date	Pos'n	Notes
SS Nankin	1912	Australia	7,131	10 May 1942	26°43′S,89°56′E	Re-named Leuthen; to Yokohama
MV Herborg	1931	Norway	7,892	19 June 1942	28°S, 19°E	Tanker, re-named Hohenfriedburg, to Yokohama
MV Madrono	1917	Norway	5,894	4 August 1942	29°50′S, 70°E	Tanker, re-named Rossbach, to Japan

== Second voyage of Michel ==
Ships sunk
Ship	Year	Flag	GRT	Date	Pos'n	Notes
MV Hoegh Silverdawn	1940	Norway	7,715	15 June 1943	25°40′S, 92°E	General cargo, 36†, 22 surv.
MV Ferncastle	1936	Merchant Navy	9,940	17 June 1943	25°S, 97°E	Tanker, 18†, 19 surv.
MV India	1939	Norway	9,977	11 September 1943		Tanker, all 41†

== Supply ships ==
Ships supplying Thor
Ship	Year	Flag	GRT	Notes
MV Alsterufer	1939	Kriegsmarine	2,729	14 February 1941
MV Eurofeld	1917	Kriegsmarine	5,863	Tanker, 14 February 1941
MV Ill	1928	Kriegsmarine	7,603	Tanker, ex-Norwegian Turicum
SS Nordmark	1930	Kriegsmarine	7,750	Ex-Westerwald, 2 January 1941
MV Regensburg	1927	Kriegsmarine	8,063	
SS Rekum	1919	Kriegsmarine	5,540	Tanker, ex-SS Heron
MV Rio Grande	1939	Kriegsmarine	6,062	
MV Spichern	1935	Kriegsmarine	9,323	Tanker, ex-Norwegian Krossfonn
MV Tannenfels	1938	Kriegsmarine	7,840	

== German commerce raiders ==
Commerce raiders
Ship	Flag	Original name	Schiff No.	Raider	Notes
Atlantis	Kriegsmarine	Goldenfels	16	C	
Komet	Kriegsmarine	Ems	45	B	
Kormoran	Kriegsmarine	Steiermark	41	G	
Michel	Kriegsmarine	Bielskoi	28	H	
Orion	Kriegsmarine	Kurmark	36	A	
Pinguin	Kriegsmarine	Kandelfels	33	F	
Stier	Kriegsmarine	Cairo	23	J	
Thor	Kriegsmarine	Santa Cruz	10	E	Destroyed by fire in Yokohama harbour
Widder	Kriegsmarine	Neumark	21	D	

== Bibliography ==
- Allen, Tony (2015). Bothnia.
- Beesly, Patrick (2015) [1977]. Very Special Intelligence: The Story of the Admiralty's Operational Intelligence Centre 1939–1945 (Frontline Books (Pen & Sword) Barnsley ed.). London: Hamish Hamilton. ISBN 978-1-78-438156-1.
- Boog, H.; Rahn, W.; Stumpf, R.; Wegner, B. (2001). The Global War: Widening of the Conflict into a World War and the Shift of the Initiative 1941–1943. Germany in the Second World War. Vol. VI. Translated by Osers, E.; Brownjohn, J.; Crampton, P.; Willmot, L. (Eng trans. Oxford University Press, London ed.). Potsdam: Militärgeschichtliches Forschungsamt (Research Institute for Military History). ISBN 0-19-822888-0.
  - Rahn, W. "Part III, the War at Sea in the Atlantic and in the Arctic Ocean, iii. The Conduct of the War in the Atlantic and the Coastal Area 2. Operations by Surface Forces (d) The Trade War with Auxiliary Cruisers". In Boog et al. (2001).
- Brice, Martin (1981). Axis Blockade Runners of World War II. London: B. T. Batsford. ISBN 0-7134-2686-1.
- Brown, David (1995) [1990]. Warship Losses of World War Two (pbk. repr. ed.). London: Arms and Armour Press. ISBN 0-85409-278-1.
- Bruhn, David (2017). Ingram's Fourth Fleet: U.S. and Royal Navy Operations against German Runners, Raiders, and Submarines in the South Atlantic in World War II. Berwyn Heights, MD: Heritage Books. ISBN 978-0-78-845757-9.
- Budiansky, S. (2000). Battle of Wits: The Complete Story of Codebreaking in World War II. New York: The Free Press (Simon & Schuster). ISBN 0-684-85932-7 – via Archive Foundation.
- Duffy, James P. (2001). Hitler's secret Pirate Fleet: The Deadliest ships of World War II (1st ed.). Westport, CN: Praeger. ISBN 0-275-96685-2.
- Elphick, Peter (1998) [1997]. Far Eastern File: The Intelligence War in the Far East 1930–1945. London: Hodder & Stoughton. ISBN 0-340-66584-X.
- Hampshire, A. Cecil (1980). The Blockaders. London: William Kimber. ISBN 0-7183-0227-3.
- Jackson, Robert (2000). Kriegsmarine: the Illustrated History of the German Navy in World War II. MBI Publishing. ISBN 978-0-76-031026-7.
- Jordan, Roger W. (2006) [1999]. The World's Merchant Fleets 1939: The Particulars and Wartime Fates of 6,000 Ships (2nd ed.). London: Chatham/Lionel Leventhal. ISBN 978-1-86176-293-1.
- Kahn, D. (1973) [1967]. The Codebreakers: The Story of Secret Writing (10th abr. Signet, Chicago ed.). New York: Macmillan. LCCN 63-16109. OCLC 78083316.
- Maier, Klaus A.; Rohde, Horst; Stegemann, Bernd; Umbreit, Hans (2015) [1991]. Falla, P. S. (ed.). Germany and the Second World War: Germany's Initial Conquests in Europe. Vol. II. Translated by McMurry, Dean S.; Osers, Ewald (trans. pbk. Clarendon Press, Oxford ed.). Freiburg im Breisgau: Militärgeschichtliches Forschungsamt [Research Institute for Military History]. ISBN 978-0-19-873834-3.
  - Stegemann, Bernd. "Part VIII The Second Phase of the War at Sea (until the Spring of 1941)". In Maier et al. (2015).
- Poolman, E. (1985). Armed Merchant Cruisers: Their Epic Story. London: Leo Cooper–Secker & Warburg. ISBN 0-436-37706-3.
- Rohwer, Jürgen; Hümmelchen, Gerhard (2005) [1972]. Chronology of the War at Sea, 1939–1945: The Naval History of World War Two (3rd rev. ed.). London: Chatham. ISBN 978-1-86176-257-3.
- Roskill, S. W. (1957) [1954]. Butler, J. R. M. (ed.). The War at Sea 1939–1945: The Defensive. History of the Second World War United Kingdom Military Series. Vol. I (4th impr. ed.). London: HMSO. OCLC 881709135.
- Woodman, Richard (2005) [2004]. The Real Cruel Sea: The Merchant Navy in the Battle of the Atlantic 1939–1943. London: John Murray. ISBN 0-7195-6599-5.
