= Otto Kähler =

German Konteradmiral (1894–1967)

Otto-Cuno Kähler
- Otto Kähler
- Born: 3 March 1894
- Died: 2 November 1967 (aged 73)
- Allegiance: German Empire; Weimar Republic; Nazi Germany
- Branch: Kriegsmarine
- Rank: Konteradmiral
- Commands: Gorch Fock; German auxiliary cruiser Thor
- Conflicts: World War I; World War II; Battle of the Atlantic; Action of 4 April 1941; Battle for Brest
- Awards: Knight's Cross of the Iron Cross with Oak Leaves
- Other work: Sales Representative for Industrial Supplies 1947-1955

Otto Kähler (3 March 1894 – 2 November 1967) was a German admiral during World War II. He commanded the German auxiliary cruiser Thor, a merchant raider, on two combat patrols and sank or captured 12 ships, for a combined tonnage of 96,547 gross register tons (GRT) of Allied shipping. He was a recipient of the Knight's Cross of the Iron Cross with Oak Leaves. Kähler relinquished command of Thor on 20 July 1941 to Günther Gumprich.

He was appointed the commander of the naval forces in Brittany in September 1944. He was captured by US forces soon thereafter. Repatriated February 1947, soon after his release he began working as a Sales Representative for Industrial Supplies in Kiel until the year 1955. He died in Kiel on 2 November 1967.

== Awards and decorations ==
- Iron Cross (1914) 2nd Class and 1st Class
- Hanseatic Cross of Hamburg (April 1915)
- U-boat War Badge (1918)
- Germany WWI Flanders Cross 1914-1918 (1921?)
- The Honour Cross of the World War 1914/1918 (1934)
- Wehrmacht Long Service Award 4th, 3rd, 2nd and 1st Class (2 October 1936)
- Spanish Cross in Silver without Swords (1939)
- Clasp to the Iron Cross (1939) 2nd Class & 1st Class
- Knight's Cross of the Iron Cross with Oak Leaves (22 December 1940)
- War Merit Cross 2nd and 1st Class with Swords
- Auxiliary Cruiser Badge (1941)
- 583rd Oak Leaves on 15 September 1944 as Konteradmiral and sea-commander of the fortress Brest

== Bibliography ==
- Dörr, Manfred (1995). Die Ritterkreuzträger der Überwasserstreitkräfte der Kriegsmarine—Band 1: A–K [The Knight's Cross Bearers of the Surface Forces of the Navy—Volume 1: A–K] (in German). Osnabrück, Germany: Biblio Verlag. ISBN 978-3-7648-2453-2.
- Fellgiebel, Walther-Peer (2000) [1986]. Die Träger des Ritterkreuzes des Eisernen Kreuzes 1939–1945 — Die Inhaber der höchsten Auszeichnung des Zweiten Weltkrieges aller Wehrmachtteile [The Bearers of the Knight's Cross of the Iron Cross 1939–1945 — The Owners of the Highest Award of the Second World War of all Wehrmacht Branches] (in German). Friedberg, Germany: Podzun-Pallas. ISBN 978-3-7909-0284-6.
- Neitzel, Sönke, ed. (19 July 2013). Tapping Hitler's Generals: Transcripts of Secret Conversations 1942–45. Barnsley: Frontline Books. ISBN 978-1-84832-715-3.
- Webb, James Jack (2024). Generals and Admirals of the Third Reich: For Country or Fuehrer. Vol. 2: H–O. Havertown, PA: Casemate Publishers. ISBN 978-1-952-71517-4.
