= María José García Borge =

Spanish scientist and nuclear scientist (born 1956)

- Born: 9 November 1956 (age 69); Madrid, Spain
- Occupation: nuclear physicist

María José García Borge (born November 9, 1956) is a Spanish nuclear physicist. She serves as a research professor at the Consejo Superior de Investigaciones Cientificas (CSIC) in Madrid and in years 2012-2017 was the Physics Group Leader and spokesperson for ISOLDE at CERN in Switzerland. She is a member of the Real Academia de las Ciencias. From 2018 till 2024 she was Editor-in-Chief for the Experimental Physics section of European Physics Journal A.In October 2024, Borge was elected chair of IUPAP Commission on Nuclear Physics for the period 2025–2027.

== Biography ==
=== Early life and education ===
Borge was born on November 9, 1956, in Madrid. Her parents were José García Prol and Esther Borge Rodriguez. She earned three degrees from University Complutense, graduating in 1978 with a physics degree, 1979 with a graduate physics degree, and 1982 with a Doctor of Philosophy in physics.

=== Career ===
Borge worked as a teaching assistant at University Complutense from 1981 to 1983. From 1982 to 1983, she worked as a postdoctoral researcher at University of Arizona and from 1984 to 1986 was a fellow of the European Organization for Nuclear Research. In 1986, she began working as a researcher at the National Research Council in Madrid.

From 2012 till 2017 she was heading the physics group at the ISOLDE facility at CERN. From 2009 till 2019 she was member of the Nuclear Physics European Collaboration Committee.

She was awarded honoris causa doctorates by Chalmers University of Technology and University of Huelva.

=== Personal life ===
On September 9, 1989, Borge married Olof Erik Ingemar Tengblad. Borge is of ethnic Spanish descent.
