= José Francisco Borges =

Brazilian popular artist, cordelist and poet (1935–2024)

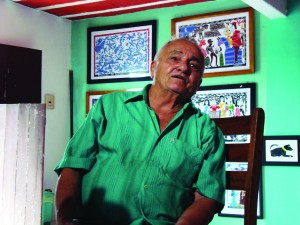
José Francisco Borges

José Francisco Borges (20 December 1935 in Sítio Piroca, in the rural area of Bezerros, Pernambuco – 26 July 2024 in the city of Bezerros), best known as J. Borges, was a Brazilian folk poet and woodcut artist. He was considered the greatest woodcut artist in northeastern Brazil, and "the most celebrated master of the art." His work was exhibited around the world, including at the Louvre and the Smithsonian. It is in the permanent collection of the Museum of International Folk Art in Santa Fe. Borges was a proponent of Cordel literature.

== Life ==
Borges was born in Bezerros, in the state of Pernambuco, and only attended one year of school, leaving at age 12. As a young man, he worked as a bricklayer, farmhand, herb seller, carpenter and potter. He began selling, and then writing and selling, the leaflets known as "cordel literature," containing epic poems illustrated with woodcut prints in a small format that the sellers would hang on strings, or cordeis. He began to illustrate them with his own woodcuts, eventually producing hundreds of different cordels or folhetos (leaflets, or chapbooks). At his workshop in Bezerros, he mentored other woodcut artists including his brother Amaro, cousin Joel, son Ivan, nephews, and adopted son José Miguel da Silva.

Borges died on 26 July 2024, aged 88, in the house he lived in for his entire life, in Bezerros.

== Work ==
According to Borges, producing a cordel takes two people two days of work. By the 1980s, Borges stated that he was selling 500,000 copies of the leaflets each year, although their popularity declined in the 1990s.

Meanwhile, starting in the 1960s, Borges began producing large-format woodcuts as well as smaller cordel illustrations. The large prints, eventually produced in color as well as the traditional black and white, are sold in galleries throughout the world. In addition to traditional scenes of life in the northeast, and folktale illustrations, he responded to the market in producing series including zodiac signs, and fruits of Brazil. His work was exhibited throughout Brazil, as well as in Paris, Zurich, Buenos Aires and in Germany and the United States.

Borges also produced 135 illustrations for the 1993 book Walking Words by Uruguayan author Eduardo Galeano, and Publishers Weekly called the illustrations "enchanting, folksy woodcuts, mixing childlike wonder and surreal fantasy."

== Honors and Legacy ==
Borges was awarded the Order of Cultural Merit by Brazilian President Fernando Henrique Cardoso. In 2002, he received a UNESCO award, and was chosen to illustrate the United Nations annual calendar. In 2005, he received a Living Heritage award from the Brazilian state of Pernambuco. In 2018, the samba school from the neighborhood of Rocinha devoted their Carnival performance in Rio de Janeiro to a tribute to Borges, cordel literature, and the northeast.
