= Nuno Borges =

Nuno Borges may refer to:

- Nuno Borges Carvalho (born 1972), Angolan engineer
- Nuno Borges (footballer) (born 1988), Cape Verdean footballer
- Nuno Borges (tennis) (born 1997), Portuguese tennis player
