= Waldemar Borges =

Brazilian politician (1958–2026)

Member of the Legislative Assembly of Pernambuco
- In office 1 February 2011 – 4 July 2026

Personal details
- Born: Waldemar Alberto Borges Rodrigues Neto; 10 July 1958 Recife, Pernambuco, Brazil
- Died: 4 July 2026 (aged 67) Recife, Pernambuco, Brazil
- Party: MDB
- Occupation: Business owner

Waldemar Alberto Borges Rodrigues Neto (10 July 1958 – 4 July 2026) was a Brazilian politician. A member of the Brazilian Democratic Movement, he served in the Legislative Assembly of Pernambuco from 2011 to 2026.

Borges died of cancer in Recife, on 4 July 2026, at the age of 67.
