= MV Carnarvon Castle =

Ocean liner and Royal Navy auxiliary cruiser

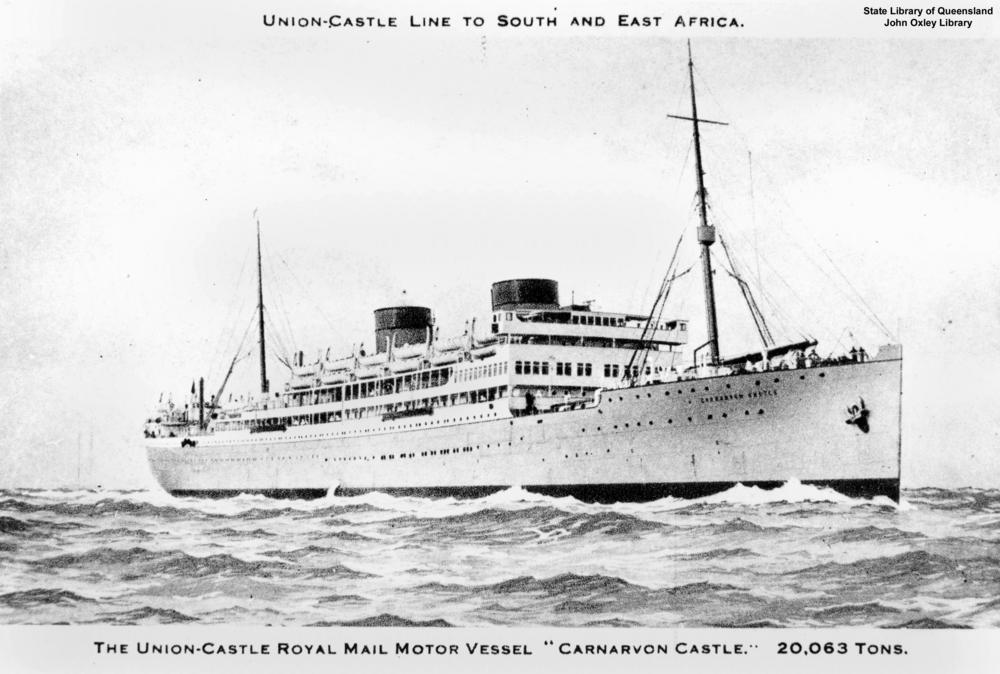

History

United Kingdom
- Name: Carnarvon Castle
- Owner: Union-Castle Line
- Builder: Harland & Wolff, Belfast
- Yard number: 595
- Launched: 14 January 1926
- Completed: 26 June 1926
- Commissioned: 9 October 1939
- Decommissioned: December 1943
- Fate: Scrapped in 1963

General characteristics
- Tonnage: 20,122 GRT; 12,089 NRT
- Length: As built: 656 ft (199.95 m); after 1937: 686 ft (209.09 m)
- Beam: 73 ft 6 in (22.40 m)
- Installed power: 3,364 nhp
- Propulsion: As built: Twin Screw; 2 Stroke Double Acting engine; Burmeister & Wain 2 × 8 cylinders; After 1938 refit: 2 × 10 cylinder 2 stroke double acting diesels; 26,000 bhp (19,000 kW)
- Speed: Cruising: 16 kn (30 km/h; 18 mph); Max: 18 kn (33 km/h; 21 mph)
- Capacity: As built: 310 first class passengers; 275 second class passengers; 266 third class passengers; After 1938 refit: 266 first class passengers; 245 second class passengers; 188 third class passengers; After 1947 refit; 607 in cabins; 671 in dormitories; After 1949 refit: 216 first class passengers; 401 tourist passengers
- Crew: 350
- Armament: As armed merchant cruiser; 8 × 6-inch guns; 2 x 3-inch anti-aircraft guns; machine guns

MV Carnarvon Castle was an ocean liner of the Union-Castle Line. She was requisitioned for service as an auxiliary cruiser by the Royal Navy during the Second World War.

== Construction and early career ==
Carnarvon Castle was built by Harland & Wolff, Belfast and launched on 14 January 1926. She was completed on 26 June 1926 and entered service for the Union-Castle Line. She was named after Caernarfon Castle. She was the first of the Union-Castle mail ships to exceed 20,000 tons and was the first motor ship to be used on the sailings between Britain and the Cape of Good Hope. She had two squat funnels, the foremost being a dummy. She served on the route until 1936, when a revised contract to carry the mails required a speed of at least 19 kn (35 km/h; 22 mph), which would result in a voyage to the Cape lasting no more than 13 1/2 days. Carnarvon Castle required a refit and was reworked by her original builders between 1937 and 1938. Her engines were replaced, a single funnel replaced the original two and her passenger capacity was altered. After undergoing sea trials on 26 June 1938, she returned to her original route on 8 July, setting a new record for the passage to the Cape of 12 days, 13 hours, 38 minutes. The record stood until 1954.

== War service ==
Carnarvon Castle was at Cape Town at the outbreak of the Second World War, and was requisitioned by the Royal Navy on 8 September 1939. She sailed to the naval base at Simonstown and was converted to an armed merchant cruiser. Commissioned as HMS Carnarvon Castle on 9 October, she sailed into the South Atlantic. On 5 December 1940 she encountered the German auxiliary cruiser Thor and had a five-hour running battle with her. She suffered heavily in the battle, sustaining 27 hits and suffering 4 dead and 27 wounded. Thor was apparently undamaged in the encounter. Carnarvon Castle put into Montevideo for repairs with steel plate reportedly salvaged from the German cruiser Admiral Graf Spee.

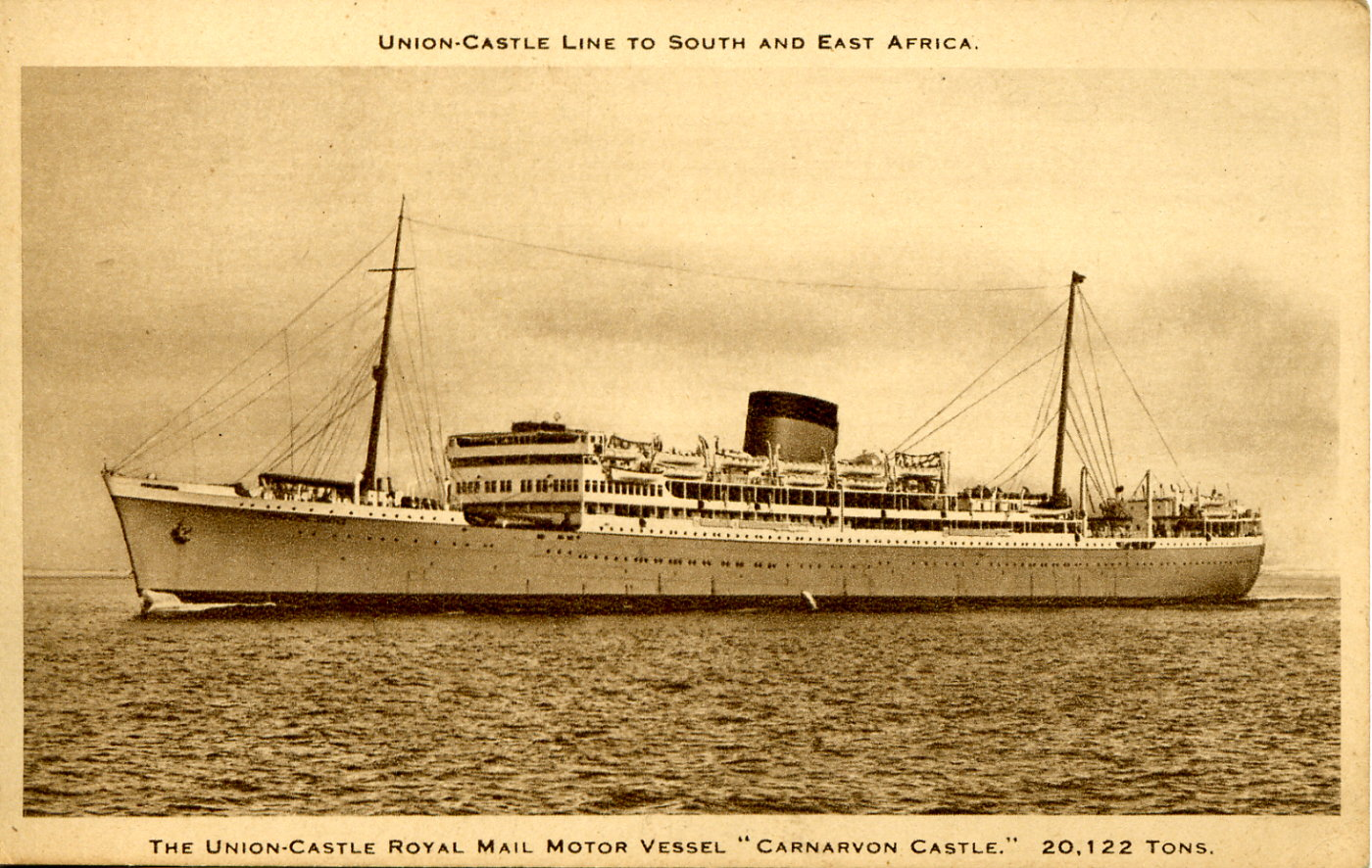
Carnarvon Castle after her 1938 refit

Carnarvon Castle's career as an armed merchant cruiser came to an end when she was decommissioned in December 1943. There were plans to convert her into an aircraft carrier but these were abandoned and she underwent a conversion to a troopship at New York City in 1944. She remained on trooping duties after the war and was finally released from naval service in March 1947. Returned to her original owners, she was back on the route to South Africa by June 1947. With her trooping accommodation only marginally upgraded, she carried a flood of post war emigrants from Britain on low cost assisted passages to East and South Africa. She was again refitted, to more luxurious standards, by Harland and Wolff in early 1949. Resuming service on 15 June 1950, she served until her retirement and sale. She arrived at Mihara, Japan on 8 September 1963 and was scrapped.

== Bibliography ==
- Osborne, Richard; Spong, Harry & Grover, Tom (2007). Armed Merchant Cruisers 1878–1945. Windsor, UK: World Warship Society. ISBN 978-0-9543310-8-5.
