= Burgess (given name) =

Burgess is a masculine given name which may refer to:

- Burgess Gardner (1936–2021), American jazz musician
- Burgess Jenkins (born 1973), American actor
- Burgess Meredith (1907–1997), American actor
- Burgess Owens (born 1951), American footballer
- Burgess Whitehead (1910–1993), American baseball player
