= Burgess =

Burgess may refer to:

== People and fictional characters ==
- Burgess (surname), a list of people and fictional characters
- Burgess (given name), a list of people

== Places ==
=== Canada ===
- Mount Burgess, a mountain in Yoho National Park, British Columbia

=== England ===
- Burgess Park, a park in London
- Burgess Field, a nature reserve in Oxford
- Burgess Hill, a town and parish in West Sussex

=== United States ===
- Burgess, Michigan, an unincorporated community
- Burgess, Missouri, an unincorporated community
- Burgess, South Carolina, an unincorporated community
- Burgess, Virginia, an unincorporated community
- Burgess Township, Bond County, Illinois, a township
- Burgess Branch, a tributary of the Missisquoi River in Vermont

== Other uses ==
- Burgess (title), a political official or representative
- Burgess Company, an American airplane manufacturer
- Burgess GAA, an athletic club in Ireland

== See also ==
- Burgess House (disambiguation), several buildings named
- Burgess model, or Concentric zone model, a theoretical model in urban geography
- Burgess reagent, used in organic chemistry
- Burgess Shale, a fossil-bearing formation near Mount Burgess in Canada
- Church Burgesses, an English charitable organisation
- House of Burgesses, Virginia, U.S.
- The Royal Burgess Golfing Society of Edinburgh
