= 1960–61 European Cup =

European football tournament

- Wankdorf Stadium in Bern hosted the final.

Tournament details
- Dates: 29 September 1960 – 31 May 1961
- Teams: 28 (26 competed) (from 25 associations)

Final positions
- Champions: (Portugal) Benfica (1st title)
- Runners-up: (Spain) Barcelona

Tournament statistics
- Matches played: 51
- Goals scored: 164 (3.22 per match)
- Attendance: 1,647,692 (32,308 per match)
- Top scorer(s): José Águas (Benfica); 11 goals

The 1960–61 European Cup was the sixth season of the European Cup, UEFA's premier club football tournament. The competition was won by Benfica, who beat Barcelona 3–2 in the final at Wankdorf Stadium in Bern, on 31 May 1961. It was the first time that five-time winners Real Madrid did not make it to the final, when they were knocked out by eventual first-time finalists Barcelona in the first round. Benfica was the first Portuguese team to reach the final and to win the tournament.

For the first time a team from Norway participated. However, again two teams withdrew from the competition after initial draw: Romanian CCA București was fearing a shameful elimination in front of the Czechoslovaks, while Northern Irish Glenavon and East German Wismut Karl-Marx-Stadt were refused visas to the other's country. UEFA authorised neutral venues but Glenavon withdrew due to the higher cost and lower revenue.

On 9 November 1960, in a first round game against Real Madrid at Santiago Bernabéu Barcelona's Luis Suárez converted penalty to score a 1000th goal in the history of European Cup.

== Teams ==
A total of 28 teams were placed in the competition bracket, but finally only 26 participated since Romanian CCA București and Northern Irish Glenavon withdrew from the competition.

Spain continued to be represented by two clubs, with Real Madrid qualifying as title holders and Barcelona as Spanish champions. CDNA Sofia appeared in the fifth edition of European Cup, with only Real Madrid having more appearances in the competition.

Lierse, Spartak Hradec Králové, Burnley, IFK Helsingfors, Hamburger SV, Panathinaikos, Limerick, Újpesti Dózsa, Fredrikstad and IFK Malmö made their debut, while Rapid Wien, AGF, Reims, Wismut Karl-Marx-Stadt, Juventus, Ajax, Legia Warsaw, Benfica, CCA București, Heart of Midlothian and Beşiktaş returned to the competition.

All entrants were their respective associations champions, except for title holders Real Madrid, as well as Swedish IFK Malmö and Polish Legia Warsaw, who were leaders of their respective leagues in spring, but later finished second.

(Austria) Rapid Wien (1st)	(Belgium) Lierse (1st)	(Bulgaria) CDNA Sofia (1st)	(Czechoslovakia) Spartak Hradec Králové (1st)
(Denmark) AGF (1st)	(East Germany) Wismut Karl-Marx-Stadt (1st)	(England) Burnley (1st)	(Finland) IFK Helsingfors (1st)
(France) Reims (1st)	(Greece) Panathinaikos (1st)	(Hungary) Újpesti Dózsa (1st)	(Italy) Juventus (1st)
(Luxembourg) Jeunesse Esch (1st)	(Netherlands) Ajax (1st)	(Northern Ireland) Glenavon (1st)	(Norway) Fredrikstad (1st)
(Poland) Legia Warsaw (2nd)	(Portugal) Benfica (1st)	(Republic of Ireland) Limerick (1st)	(Romania) CCA București (1st)
(Scotland) Heart of Midlothian (1st)	(Spain) Barcelona (1st)	(Spain) Real Madrid (2nd)^{TH}	(Sweden) IFK Malmö (2nd)
(Switzerland) Young Boys (1st)	(Turkey) Beşiktaş (1st)	(West Germany) Hamburger SV (1st)	(Socialist Federal Republic of Yugoslavia) Red Star Belgrade (1st)

== Preliminary round ==
Location of teams in the 1960–61 European Cup

The draw for the preliminary round took place at UEFA headquarters in Paris, France, on 7 July 1960. As title holders, Real Madrid received a bye, and the remaining 27 teams were grouped geographically into three pots. The first team drawn in each pot also received a bye, while the remaining clubs would play the preliminary round in September.

	Pot 1 Northern Europe	Pot 2 Western Europe	Pot 3 Eastern Europe
Drawn	Northern Ireland; East Germany; Poland; Norway; Finland; Sweden; Denmark; Netherlands	France; Republic of Ireland; Belgium; Luxembourg; Switzerland; Scotland; Spain; Portugal	Austria; Romania; Bulgaria; Turkey; Czechoslovakia; Hungary; Yugoslavia; Italy
Byes	(West Germany) Hamburger SV	(England) Burnley	(Greece) Panathinaikos

The calendar was decided by the involved teams, with all matches to be played by 30 September.

Team 1	Agg.	Team 2	1st leg	2nd leg
Heart of Midlothian (Scotland)	1–5	(Portugal) Benfica	1–2	0–3
Red Star Belgrade (Socialist Federal Republic of Yugoslavia)	1–5	(Hungary) Újpesti Dózsa	1–2	0–3
Fredrikstad (Norway)	4–3	(Netherlands) Ajax	4–3	0–0
AGF (Denmark)	3–1	(Poland) Legia Warsaw	3–0	0–1
Juventus (Italy)	3–4	(Bulgaria) CDNA Sofia	2–0	1–4
IFK Helsingfors (Finland)	2–5	(Sweden) IFK Malmö	1–3	1–2
Rapid Wien (Austria)	4–1	(Turkey) Beşiktaş	4–0	0–1
Limerick (Republic of Ireland)	2–9	(Switzerland) Young Boys	0–5	2–4
CCA București (Socialist Republic of Romania)	(w/o) (Note: Following Romania's national team loss with 5–0 on aggregate against Czechoslovakia in the 1960 European Nations' Cup quarter-finals, when the communist authorities saw that CCA București had to play with the champion of Czechoslovakia in the European Cup, they withdrew the team from the competition, fearing a shameful elimination in front of the Czechoslovaks.)	(Czechoslovakia) Spartak Hradec Králové	–	–
Glenavon (Northern Ireland)	(w/o) (Note: Each team was refused visas to the other's country. UEFA authorised neutral venues but Glenavon withdrew due to the higher cost and lower revenue.)	(East Germany) Wismut Karl-Marx-Stadt	–	–
Reims (France)	11–1	(Luxembourg) Jeunesse Esch	6–1	5–0
Barcelona (Spain)	5–0	(Belgium) Lierse	2–0	3–0

=== First leg ===
31 August 1960

Limerick (Republic of Ireland)	0–5	(Switzerland) Young Boys
	Report	Wechselberger 54', 88'; Schneider 70'; Dürr 76'; Meier 82'

Thomond Park, Limerick
Attendance: 8,000
Referee: José María Ortiz de Mendíbil (Spain)

31 August 1960

Fredrikstad (Norway)	4–3	(Netherlands) Ajax
Olsen 35'; Kristoffersen 48'; Pedersen 59'; Borgen 70'	Report	C. Groot 26', 75'; Swart 37'

Fredrikstad Stadion, Fredrikstad
Attendance: 7,500
Referee: Jarl Hansen (Denmark)

1 September 1960

IFK Helsingfors (Finland)	1–3	(Sweden) IFK Malmö
Nevalainen 64'	Report	Olofsson 12'; Ljung 41'; Borg 60'

Helsinki Olympic Stadium, Helsinki
Attendance: 1,555
Referee: Gerhard Schulenburg (West Germany)

7 September 1960

Reims (France)	6–1	(Luxembourg) Jeunesse Esch
Vincent 4'; Rustichelli 16'; Dubaële 38', 59', 64'; Piantoni 85'	Report	Meurisse 87'

Stade Auguste-Delaune, Reims
Attendance: 8,150
Referee: Reidar Randers-Johansen (Norway)

14 September 1960
20:30 CET

Rapid Wien (Austria)	4–0	(Turkey) Beşiktaş
Akı 9' (o.g.); Dienst 20'; Glechner 86' (pen.); Bertalan 90'	Report

Praterstadion, Vienna
Attendance: 30,000
Referee: Stanislav Fencl (Czechoslovakia)

21 September 1960

AGF (Denmark)	3–0	(Poland) Legia Warsaw
Amdisen 32'; Kjær 51'; Jensen 75'	Report

Aarhus Stadium, Aarhus
Attendance: 10,268
Referee: Johan Bronkhorst (Netherlands)

21 September 1960
22:30 CET

Juventus (Italy)	2–0	(Bulgaria) CDNA Sofia
Lojodice 5'; Sívori 24'	Report

Stadio Comunale, Turin
Attendance: 20,168
Referee: Dittmar Huber (Switzerland)

28 September 1960
16:00 CET

Red Star Belgrade (Socialist Federal Republic of Yugoslavia)	1–2	(Hungary) Újpesti Dózsa
Toplak 17'	Report	Göröcs 38'; Kuharszki 68'

Stadion JNA, Belgrade
Attendance: 20,000
Referee: Józef Kowal (Poland)

28 September 1960
21:30 CET

Barcelona (Spain)	2–0	(Belgium) Lierse
Czibor 47'; Luis Suárez 73'	Report

Camp Nou, Barcelona
Attendance: 42,068
Referee: Giuseppe Adami (Italy)

29 September 1960
21:30 CET

Heart of Midlothian (Scotland)	1–2	(Portugal) Benfica
Young 80'	Report	Águas 36'; José Augusto 74'

Tynecastle Park, Edinburgh
Attendance: 29,500
Referee: Marcel Lequesne (France)

=== Second leg ===
7 September 1960

Ajax (Netherlands)	0–0	(Norway) Fredrikstad
	Report

Olympisch Stadion, Amsterdam
Attendance: 35,000
Referee: Frede Hansen (Denmark)

Fredrikstad won 4–3 on aggregate.

28 September 1960

IFK Malmö (Sweden)	2–1	(Finland) IFK Helsingfors
Lundqvist 22'; Ljung 28'	Report	Kivelä 30'

Malmö IP, Malmö
Attendance: 5,202
Referee: Günther Ternieden (West Germany)

IFK Malmö won 5–2 on aggregate.

28 September 1960
14:30 CET

Beşiktaş (Turkey)	1–0	(Austria) Rapid Wien
Özataç 11'	Report

Mithatpaşa Stadyumu, Istanbul
Attendance: 17,268
Referee: Kostadin Dinov (Bulgaria)

Rapid Wien won 4–1 on aggregate.

5 October 1960

Legia Warsaw (Poland)	1–0	(Denmark) AGF
Nowak 29'	Report

Stadion Wojska Polskiego, Warsaw
Attendance: 10,642
Referee: Leopold Horn (Netherlands)

AGF won 3–1 on aggregate.

5 October 1960

Jeunesse Esch (Luxembourg)	0–5	(France) Reims
	Report	Vincent 50'; Moreau 58'; Heinen 60' (o.g.); Rustichelli 63', 69'

Stade de la Frontière, Esch-sur-Alzette
Attendance: 7,265
Referee: Raymond Lespineux (Belgium)

Reims won 11–1 on aggregate.

5 October 1960
19:30 CET

Lierse (Belgium)	0–3	(Spain) Barcelona
	Report	Villaverde 7'; Evaristo 26', 77'

Émile Versé Stadium, Anderlecht
Attendance: 19,110
Referee: Giulio Campanati (Italy)

Barcelona won 5–0 on aggregate.

5 October 1960

Benfica (Portugal)	3–0	(Scotland) Heart of Midlothian
Águas 7', 60'; José Augusto 49'	Report

Estádio da Luz, Lisbon
Attendance: 30,122
Referee: Joseph Barbéran (France)

Benfica won 5–1 on aggregate.

5 October 1960
20:15 CET

Young Boys (Switzerland)	4–2	(Republic of Ireland) Limerick
Allemann 40'; Schneider 68', 72'; Dürr 81'	Report	Lynam 36'; O'Reilly 75'

Wankdorf Stadium, Bern
Attendance: 21,000
Referee: Juan Gardeazabal Garay (Spain)

Young Boys won 9–2 on aggregate.

12 October 1960
16:00 CET

Újpesti Dózsa (Hungary)	3–0	(Socialist Federal Republic of Yugoslavia) Red Star Belgrade
Borsányi 74'; Pataki 77'; Göröcs 88'	Report

Megyeri úti Stadion, Budapest
Attendance: 15,000
Referee: Julian Mytnik (Poland)

Újpesti Dózsa won 5–1 on aggregate.

12 October 1960
18:00 CET

CDNA Sofia (Bulgaria)	4–1	(Italy) Juventus
Kovachev 20', 57'; Panayotov 67'; Tsanev 80'	Report	Nicolè 89'

Vasil Levski National Stadium, Sofia
Attendance: 31,629
Referee: Gottfried Dienst (Switzerland)

CDNA Sofia won 4–3 on aggregate.

== Bracket ==
First round
(Spain) Real Madrid	2	1	3
(Spain) Barcelona	2	2	4
(Czechoslovakia) Spartak Hradec Králové	1	0	1
(Greece) Panathinaikos	0	0	0
(England) Burnley	2	2	4
(France) Reims	0	3	3
(Switzerland) Young Boys	0	3	3
(West Germany) Hamburger SV	5	3	8
(Portugal) Benfica	6	1	7
(Hungary) Újpesti Dózsa	2	2	4
(Denmark) AGF	3	1	4
(Norway) Fredrikstad	0	0	0
(Austria) Rapid Wien	3	0	3 (1)
(East Germany) Wismut Karl-Marx-Stadt	1	2	3 (0)
(Sweden) IFK Malmö	1	1	2
(Bulgaria) CDNA Sofia	0	1	1

Quarter-finals
(Spain) Barcelona	4	1	5
(Czechoslovakia) Spartak Hradec Králové	0	1	1
(England) Burnley	3	1	4
(West Germany) Hamburger SV	1	4	5
(Portugal) Benfica	3	4	7
(Denmark) AGF	1	1	2
(Austria) Rapid Wien	2	2	4
(Sweden) IFK Malmö	0	0	0

Semi-finals
(Spain) Barcelona	1	1	2 (1)
(West Germany) Hamburger SV	0	2	2 (0)
(Portugal) Benfica	3	1	4
(Austria) Rapid Wien	0	1	1

Final
(Spain) Barcelona	2
(Portugal) Benfica	3

== First round ==
Team 1	Agg.	Team 2	1st leg	2nd leg	Play-off
Benfica (Portugal)	7–4	(Hungary) Újpesti Dózsa	6–2	1–2	
AGF (Denmark)	4–0	(Norway) Fredrikstad	3–0	1–0	
Rapid Wien (Austria)	3–3	(East Germany) Wismut Karl-Marx-Stadt	3–1	0–2	1–0
IFK Malmö (Sweden)	2–1	(Bulgaria) CDNA Sofia	1–0	1–1	
Real Madrid (Spain)	3–4	(Spain) Barcelona	2–2	1–2	
Spartak Hradec Králové (Czechoslovakia)	1–0	(Greece) Panathinaikos	1–0	0–0	
Burnley (England)	4–3	(France) Reims	2–0	2–3	
Young Boys (Switzerland)	3–8	(West Germany) Hamburger SV	0–5	3–3	

=== First leg ===
19 October 1960

AGF (Denmark)	3–0	(Norway) Fredrikstad
Amdisen 70'; Overby 85'; Jensen 86'	Report

Aarhus Stadium, Aarhus
Attendance: 9,123
Referee: Erik Johansson (Sweden)

2 November 1960

IFK Malmö (Sweden)	1–0	(Bulgaria) CDNA Sofia
Karlsson 79'	Report

Malmö Stadion, Malmö
Attendance: 7,707
Referee: Josef Kandlbinder (Germany)

2 November 1960
20:15 CET

Young Boys (Switzerland)	0–5	(West Germany) Hamburger SV
	Report	Stürmer 24', 52'; Seeler 34', 39'; Neisner 72'

Wankdorf Stadium, Bern
Attendance: 45,000
Referee: Johan Bronkhorst (Netherlands)

6 November 1960
16:00 CET

Benfica (Portugal)	6–2	(Hungary) Újpesti Dózsa
Cavém 1'; Águas 6', 28'; José Augusto 12', 87'; Santana 16'	Report	Göröcs 69'; Szusza 77'

Estádio da Luz, Lisbon
Attendance: 55,000
Referee: Victor Schicker (Switzerland)

6 November 1960

Spartak Hradec Králové (Czechoslovakia)	1–0	(Greece) Panathinaikos
Šonka 89'	Report

Všesportovní stadion, Hradec Králové
Attendance: 25,000
Referee: Branko Tesanić (Yugoslavia)

9 November 1960
19:30 CET

Rapid Wien (Austria)	3–1	(East Germany) Wismut Karl-Marx-Stadt
Dienst 3'; Milanović 52'; Hanappi 61'	Report	Wagner 16'

Praterstadion, Vienna
Attendance: 25,000
Referee: Gaston Grandain (Belgium)

9 November 1960
20:30 CET

Real Madrid (Spain)	2–2	(Spain) Barcelona
Mateos 3'; Gento 33'	Report	Luis Suárez 27', 87' (pen.)

Santiago Bernabéu, Madrid
Attendance: 84,358
Referee: Arthur Edward Ellis (England)

16 November 1960
20:30 CET

Burnley (England)	2–0	(France) Reims
Robson 1'; McIlroy 22'	Report

Turf Moor, Burnley
Attendance: 37,404
Referee: José González Echevarría (Spain)

=== Second leg ===
26 October 1960

Fredrikstad (Norway)	0–1	(Denmark) AGF
	Report	Overby 49'

Bislett Stadion, Oslo
Attendance: 10,334
Referee: Bengt Lundell (Sweden)

AGF won 4–0 on aggregate.

13 November 1960

CDNA Sofia (Bulgaria)	1–1	(Sweden) IFK Malmö
Tsanev 21'	Report	Olofsson 52'

Vasil Levski National Stadium, Sofia
Attendance: 52,000
Referee: Johannes Malka (West Germany)

IFK Malmö won 2–1 on aggregate.

23 November 1960
14:00 CET

Wismut Karl-Marx-Stadt (East Germany)	2–0	(Austria) Rapid Wien
Bamberger 49'; Zink 62'	Report

Otto-Grotewohl-Stadion, Aue
Attendance: 25,000
Referee: Gérard Versyp (Belgium)

Rapid Wien 3–3 Wismut Karl-Marx-Stadt on aggregate; play-off needed.

23 November 1960
21:00 CET

Barcelona (Spain)	2–1	(Spain) Real Madrid
Vergés 33'; Evaristo 82'	Report	Canário 87'

Camp Nou, Barcelona
Attendance: 90,000
Referee: Reginald Leafe (England)

Barcelona won 4–3 on aggregate.

27 November 1960
17:30 CET

Hamburger SV (West Germany)	3–3	(Switzerland) Young Boys
Stürmer 13'; Dörfel 72'; Walker 86' (o.g.)	Report	Bigler 21' (pen.); Meier 25'; Schneiter 48'

Volksparkstadion, Hamburg
Attendance: 45,000
Referee: Pieter Paulus Roomer (Netherlands)

Hamburger SV won 8–3 on aggregate.

30 November 1960
17:30 CET

Újpesti Dózsa (Hungary)	2–1	(Portugal) Benfica
Halapi 55'; Szusza 61'	Report	Santana 5'

Népstadion, Budapest
Attendance: 35,000
Referee: Albert Guinnard (Switzerland)

Benfica won 7–4 on aggregate.

30 November 1960

Reims (France)	3–2	(England) Burnley
Piantoni 50'; Rodzik 56', 75'	Report	Robson 33'; Connelly 57'

Parc des Princes, Paris
Attendance: 36,831
Referee: Manuel Asensi Martín (Spain)

Burnley won 4–3 on aggregate.

7 December 1960

Panathinaikos (Greece)	0–0	(Czechoslovakia) Spartak Hradec Králové
	Report

Leoforos Alexandras Stadium, Athens
Attendance: 22,000
Referee: Gino Rigato (Italy)

Spartak Hradec Králové won 1–0 on aggregate.

=== Play-off ===
21 December 1960
20:30 CET

Rapid Wien (Austria)	1–0	(East Germany) Wismut Karl-Marx-Stadt
Flögel 4'	Report

St. Jakob Stadium, Basel
Attendance: 10,000
Referee: Gottfried Dienst (Switzerland)

Rapid Wien won play-off 1–0.

== Quarter-finals ==
Team 1	Agg.	Team 2	1st leg	2nd leg
Benfica (Portugal)	7–2	(Denmark) AGF	3–1	4–1
Rapid Wien (Austria)	4–0	(Sweden) IFK Malmö	2–0	2–0
Barcelona (Spain)	5–1	(Czechoslovakia) Spartak Hradec Králové	4–0	1–1
Burnley (England)	4–5	(West Germany) Hamburger SV	3–1	1–4

=== First leg ===
18 January 1961
20:30 CET

Burnley (England)	3–1	(West Germany) Hamburger SV
Pilkington 7', 59'; Robson 72'	Report	Dörfel 75'

Turf Moor, Burnley
Attendance: 46,237
Referee: Tage Sørensen (Denmark)

8 March 1961
21:00 CET

Barcelona (Spain)	4–0	(Czechoslovakia) Spartak Hradec Králové
Tejada 11', 64'; Evaristo 39'; Kubala 90' (pen.)	Report

Camp Nou, Barcelona
Attendance: 70,000
Referee: Giuseppe Adami (Italy)

8 March 1961
22:30 CET

Benfica (Portugal)	3–1	(Denmark) AGF
Águas 20', 58'; José Augusto 49' (pen.)	Report	Amdisen 51'

Estádio da Luz, Lisbon
Attendance: 57,100
Referee: Maurice Guigue (France)

22 March 1961
19:30 CET

Rapid Wien (Austria)	2–0	(Sweden) IFK Malmö
Dienst 44'; Bertalan 87'	Report

Praterstadion, Vienna
Attendance: 12,000
Referee: Marian Koczner (Poland)

=== Second leg ===
15 March 1961
15:00 CET

Spartak Hradec Králové (Czechoslovakia)	1–1	(Spain) Barcelona
Zikán 33'	Report	Luis Suárez 23'

Stadion Evžena Rošického, Prague
Attendance: 45,000
Referee: Concetto Lo Bello (Italy)

Barcelona won 5–1 on aggregate.

15 March 1961
16:30 CET

Hamburger SV (West Germany)	4–1	(England) Burnley
Stürmer 8'; Seeler 42', 61'; Dörfel 57'	Report	Harris 55'

Volksparkstadion, Hamburg
Attendance: 74,000
Referee: Aage Poulsen (Denmark)

Hamburger SV won 5–4 on aggregate.

30 March 1961
13:30 CET

AGF (Denmark)	1–4	(Portugal) Benfica
Jensen 75'	Report	José Augusto 1', 43'; Águas 23'; Santana 76'

Aarhus Stadium, Aarhus
Attendance: 22,577
Referee: Marcel Bois (France)

Benfica won 7–2 on aggregate.

3 April 1961
13:30 CET

IFK Malmö (Sweden)	0–2	(Austria) Rapid Wien
	Report	Bertalan 38'; Flögel 83'

Malmö Stadion, Malmö
Attendance: 18,842
Referee: Wlodzimierz Storoniak (Poland)

Rapid Wien won 4–0 on aggregate.

== Semi-finals ==
Team 1	Agg.	Team 2	1st leg	2nd leg	Play-off
Benfica (Portugal)	4–1	(Austria) Rapid Wien	3–0	1–1 (Note: Game abandoned with two minutes to play due to crowd riots and pitch invasion.)	
Barcelona (Spain)	2–2	(West Germany) Hamburger SV	1–0	1–2	1–0

=== First leg ===
12 April 1961
21:00 CET

Barcelona (Spain)	1–0	(West Germany) Hamburger SV
Evaristo 46'	Report

Camp Nou, Barcelona
Attendance: 48,000
Referee: Lucien van Nuffel (Belgium)

26 April 1961
22:45 CET

Benfica (Portugal)	3–0	(Austria) Rapid Wien
Coluna 19'; Águas 24'; Cavém 61'	Report

Estádio da Luz, Lisbon
Attendance: 65,000
Referee: Kevin Howley (England)

=== Second leg ===
26 April 1961
17:30 CET

Hamburger SV (West Germany)	2–1	(Spain) Barcelona
Wulf 58'; Seeler 68'	Report	Kocsis 90'

Volksparkstadion, Hamburg
Attendance: 71,000
Referee: Gérard Versyp (Belgium)

Barcelona 2–2 Hamburger SV on aggregate; play-off needed.

4 May 1961
19:30 CET

Rapid Wien (Austria)	1–1	(Portugal) Benfica
Skocik 71'	Report	Águas 66'

Praterstadion, Vienna
Attendance: 63,000
Referee: Reginald Leafe (England)

Benfica won 4–1 on aggregate.

=== Play-off ===
3 May 1961
17:00 CET

Barcelona (Spain)	1–0	(West Germany) Hamburger SV
Evaristo 42'	Report

Heysel Stadium, Brussels
Attendance: 44,000
Referee: Tage Sørensen (Denmark)

Barcelona won play-off 1–0.

== Final ==
31 May 1961
20:00 CET

Barcelona (Spain)	2–3	(Portugal) Benfica
Kocsis 21'; Czibor 75'	Report	Águas 31'; Ramallets 32' (o.g.); Coluna 55'

Wankdorf Stadium, Bern
Attendance: 26,732
Referee: Gottfried Dienst (Switzerland)

== Top goalscorers ==
The top scorers from the 1960–61 European Cup (including preliminary round) are as follows:

Rank	Player	Team	Goals
1	(Portugal) José Águas	(Portugal) Benfica	11
2	(Portugal) José Augusto	(Portugal) Benfica	7
3	(Brazil) Evaristo	(Spain) Barcelona	6
4	(West Germany) Uwe Seeler	(West Germany) Hamburger SV	5
5	(West Germany) Klaus Stürmer	(West Germany) Hamburger SV	4
5	(Spain) Luis Suárez	(Spain) Barcelona	4
7	(Denmark) John Amdisen	(Denmark) AGF	3
7	(Austria) Josef Bertalan	(Austria) Rapid Wien	3
7	(Austria) Robert Dienst	(Austria) Rapid Wien	3
7	(West Germany) Charly Dörfel	(West Germany) Hamburger SV	3
7	(France) Claude Dubaële	(France) Reims	3
7	(Hungary) János Göröcs	(Hungary) Újpesti Dózsa	3
7	(Denmark) John Jensen	(Denmark) AGF	3
7	(England) Jimmy Robson	(England) Burnley	3
7	(France) Dominique Rustichelli	(France) Reims	3
7	(Portugal) Santana	(Portugal) Benfica	3
7	(Switzerland) Willy Schneider	(Switzerland) Young Boys	3
