= 1960–61 in Swiss football =

Football in Switzerland
- Season: 1960–61

Men's football
- Nationalliga A: Servette
- Nationalliga B: Lugano
- 1. Liga: 1. Liga champions: FC Porrentruy; Group West: SC Burgdorf; Group Cenral: FC Porrentruy; Group South and East: FC Bodio
- Swiss Cup: La Chaux-de-Fonds

The following is a summary of the 1960–61 season of competitive football in Switzerland, including their times played, wins, draws, losses and more.

== Nationalliga A ==
=== Final league table ===
Pos	Team	Pld	W	D	L	GF	GA	GD	Pts	Qualification
1	Servette	26	23	0	3	77	29	+48	46	Swiss Champions qualified for 1961–62 European Cup
2	Young Boys	26	15	6	5	70	37	+33	36	
3	Zürich	26	15	5	6	74	43	+31	35	Entered 1961–62 International Football Cup
4	Grenchen	26	12	6	8	68	49	+19	30	Entered 1961–62 International Football Cup
5	Basel	26	13	2	11	42	36	+6	28	Entered 1961–62 International Football Cup
6	Grasshopper Club	26	10	6	10	60	53	+7	26	
7	La Chaux-de-Fonds	26	11	4	11	65	64	+1	26	Swiss Cup winners qualified for 1961–62 Cup Winners' Cup and entered 1961–62 International Football Cup
8	Luzern	26	9	6	11	37	45	−8	24	
9	Lausanne-Sport	26	9	5	12	57	58	−1	23	
10	Biel-Bienne	26	8	7	11	43	47	−4	23	
11	Young Fellows Zürich	26	8	6	12	48	63	−15	22	
12	Fribourg	26	7	6	13	30	55	−25	20	
13	Winterthur	26	8	1	17	33	66	−33	17	Relegated to 1961–62 Nationalliga B
14	Chiasso	26	2	4	20	22	81	−59	8	Relegated to 1961–62 Nationalliga B

Source: rsssf.com
Rules for classification: 1) Points; 2) Goal difference within the league, however with play-off for qualifiers;

== Nationalliga B ==
=== Final league table ===
Pos	Team	Pld	W	D	L	GF	GA	GD	Pts	Qualification or relegation
1	FC Lugano	26	16	6	4	77	36	+41	38	NLB Champions and promoted to 1961–62 Nationalliga A
2	FC Schaffhausen	26	16	4	6	55	29	+26	36	Play off for second position
3	AC Bellinzona	26	14	8	4	52	30	+22	36	Play off for second position
4	Yverdon-Sport FC	26	17	1	8	51	37	+14	35	
5	FC Thun	26	13	6	7	62	36	+26	32	
6	FC Sion	26	11	5	10	51	51	0	27	
7	FC Bern	26	9	7	10	55	59	−4	25	
8	FC Martigny-Sports	26	7	10	9	36	48	−12	24	
9	SC Brühl	26	8	5	13	46	50	−4	21	
10	Vevey Sports	26	8	5	13	28	41	−13	21	
11	FC Aarau	26	7	7	12	32	53	−21	21	
12	Urania Genève Sport	26	7	6	13	39	47	−8	20	
13	FC Cantonal Neuchâtel	26	6	5	15	44	72	−28	17	Relegated to 1961–62 1. Liga
14	FC Nordstern Basel	26	5	1	20	27	66	−39	11	Relegated to 1961–62 1. Liga

Source: rsssf.com
Rules for classification: 1) Points; 2) Goal difference within the league, however with play-off for qualifiers;

=== Decider for second place ===
Schaffhausen and Bellinzona ended the season level on points, therefore a play-off for promotion was required. The decider match for second place was played on 18 June 1961 at the Stadion Neufeld in Bern.

Team 1	Score	Team 2
Schaffhausen	2–0 *	Bellinzona

* Note: The match was abandoned due to pitch invasion in the 68th Minute.

The replay was played on 23 July at Stadion Allmend in Lucerne.

Team 1	Score	Team 2
Schaffhausen	4–0	Bellinzona

Schaffhausen won and were promoted to 1961–62 Nationalliga A. Bellinzona remained in the division.

== 1. Liga ==
=== Group West ===
Pos	Team	Pld	W	D	L	GF	GA	GD	Pts	Qualification or relegation
1	SC Burgdorf	22	15	4	3	62	21	+41	34	Play-off to Nationalliga B
2	FC Xamax	22	12	4	6	61	46	+15	28	
3	FC Versoix	22	12	2	8	51	44	+7	26	
4	Etoile Carouge FC	22	12	1	9	61	44	+17	25	
5	FC Sierre	22	10	4	8	48	43	+5	24	
6	FC Langenthal	22	9	5	8	51	43	+8	23	
7	FC Bözingen 34	22	8	5	9	55	50	+5	21	
8	FC Forward Morges	22	7	5	10	36	44	−8	19	
9	FC Raron	22	6	7	9	41	56	−15	19	
10	FC Monthey	22	7	5	10	36	52	−16	19	
11	ES FC Malley	22	6	6	10	24	36	−12	18	Play-out against relegation
12	FC Stade Payerne	22	1	6	15	33	80	−47	8	Relegation to 2. Liga

Source: RSSSF
Rules for classification: 1) Points; 2) Goal difference within the league, but decider play-off for qualifiers.

=== Group Central ===
Pos	Team	Pld	W	D	L	GF	GA	GD	Pts	Qualification or relegation
1	FC Porrentruy	22	14	5	3	39	22	+17	33	Play-off to Nationalliga B
2	FC Baden	22	13	5	4	53	38	+15	31	
3	FC Concordia Basel	22	10	7	5	49	33	+16	27	
4	FC Solothurn	22	9	7	6	47	37	+10	25	
5	FC Moutier	22	7	8	7	42	36	+6	22	
6	FC Dietikon	22	8	6	8	40	33	+7	22	
7	BSC Old Boys	22	8	5	9	26	32	−6	21	
8	FC Alle	22	7	6	9	31	41	−10	20	
9	Lengnau	22	7	6	9	35	46	−11	20	
10	FC Wettingen	22	6	7	9	34	35	−1	19	
11	SR Delémont	22	5	4	13	43	60	−17	14	Play-out against relegation
12	FC Bassecourt	22	3	4	15	24	50	−26	10	Relegation to 2. Liga

Source: RSSSF
Rules for classification: 1) Points; 2) Goal difference within the league, but decider play-off for qualifiers.

=== Group South and East ===
Pos	Team	Pld	W	D	L	GF	GA	GD	Pts	Qualification or relegation
1	FC Bodio	22	15	5	2	50	24	+26	35	Play-off to Nationalliga B
2	FC St. Gallen	22	13	6	3	77	36	+41	32	
3	FC Locarno	22	11	7	4	47	35	+12	29	
4	FC Blue Stars Zürich	22	10	7	5	56	32	+24	27	
5	SV Höngg	22	7	8	7	40	42	−2	22	
6	FC Red Star Zürich	22	6	9	7	31	34	−3	21	
7	FC Emmenbrücke	22	7	5	10	39	47	−8	19	
8	FC Solduno	22	6	7	9	34	47	−13	19	
9	FC Vaduz	22	7	4	11	53	63	−10	18	
10	FC Rapid Lugano	22	6	5	11	26	31	−5	17	
11	FC Wil	22	4	6	12	27	46	−19	14	Play-out against relegation
12	AS Lamone-Cadempino	22	4	3	15	25	68	−43	11	Relegation to 2. Liga

Source: RSSSF
Rules for classification: 1) Points; 2) Goal difference within the league, but decider play-off for qualifiers.

=== Promotion, relegation ===
==== Promotion play-off ====
The three group winners played single a round-robin for the two promotion slots and for the championship. The games were played on 18 and 25 June and 2 July 1961.

Pos	Team	Pld	W	D	L	GF	GA	GD	Pts	Qualification	POR	BOD	BUR
1	FC Porrentruy	2	1	1	0	4	3	+1	3	1. Liga champions and promotion to 1961–62 Nationalliga B	—	—	3–2
2	FC Bodio	2	0	2	0	1	1	0	2	Promotion to 1961–62 Nationalliga B	1–1	—	—
3	SC Burgdorf	2	0	1	1	2	3	−1	1		—	0–0	—

Source: RSSSF
Rules for classification: 1) Points; 2) Head-to-head 3) Decider.

FC Porrentruy became 1. Liga champions. The champions and the runners-up FC Bodio were promoted to 1961–62 Nationalliga B. SC Burgdorf remained in the division.

==== Relegation play-out ====
The three second last placed teams in each group, contested a play-out to decide the fourth and last relegation slot. The games were played on 18 and 25 June and 2 July 1961.

Pos	Team	Pld	W	D	L	GF	GA	GD	Pts	Relegation	DEL	ESM	WIL
1	SR Delémont	2	2	0	0	4	1	+3	4		—	—	3–1
2	ES FC Malley	2	1	0	1	2	1	+1	2		0–1	—	—
3	FC Wil	2	0	0	2	1	5	−4	0	Relegation to 2. Liga	—	0–2	—

Source: RSSSF
Rules for classification: 1) Points; 2) Head-to-head 3) Decider.

Delémont and Malley remained in the division. FC Wil were relegated to 2. Liga.

== Swiss Cup ==
The competition was played in a knockout system. In the case of a draw, extra time was played. If the teams were still level after extra time, the match was replayed at the away team's ground. In the replay, in case of a draw after extra time, a toss of the coin would decide which team progressed.

=== Early rounds ===
The routes of the finalists to the final were:

- Second round: teams from the NLA and NLB with byes.
- Third round: ChdF-Delémont 3:1. Biel-Burgdorf 4:0.
- Fourth round: ChdF-Lengnau 3:1. Biel-YB 3:1.
- Fifth round: Urania Genf-ChdF 0:1. Thun-Biel 3:4 (a.e.t.).
- Quarter-finals: ChdF-Lausanne 4:1. Chiasso-Biel 1:1 (a.e.t.). Replay: Biel-Chiasso 1:0.
- Semi-finals: Schaffhausen-ChdF 0:2. Biel-Luzern 3:1.

=== Final ===
The final was held at the former Wankdorf Stadium on Sunday 23 April 1961.

23 April 1961

La Chaux-de-Fonds	1–0	Biel-Bienne
Frigerio 45'	Summary

Wankdorf Stadium, Bern
Attendance: 20,000
Referee: (Switzerland) Fritz Schorer (Interlaken)

== Swiss Clubs in Europe ==
This was the sixth season with the European Cup and it was the first season that the Cup Winners' Cup tournament took place.

- Young Boys as 1959–60 Nationalliga A champions: 1960–61 European Cup
- Luzern as 1959–60 Swiss Cup winners: 1960–61 Cup Winners' Cup

=== Young Boys ===
==== European Cup ====
===== Preliminary round =====
31 August 1960 First leg	Limerick (Republic of Ireland)	0–5	(Switzerland) Young Boys	Thomond Park, Limerick
		Report	Wechselberger 54', 88'; Schneider 70'; Dürr 76'; Meier 82'	Attendance: 8,000; Referee: José María Ortiz de Mendíbil (Spain)

5 October 1960 Second leg	Young Boys (Switzerland)	4–2	(Republic of Ireland) Limerick	Wankdorf Stadium, Bern
20:15 CET	Allemann 40'; Schneider 68', 72'; Dürr 81'	Report	Lynam 36'; O'Reilly 75'	Attendance: 21,000; Referee: Juan Gardeazabal Garay (Spain)

Young Boys won 9–2 on aggregate.

===== First round =====
2 November 1960 First leg	Young Boys (Switzerland)	0–5	(West Germany) Hamburger SV	Wankdorf Stadium, Bern
20:15 CET		Report	Stürmer 24', 52'; Seeler 34', 39'; Neisner 72'	Attendance: 45,000; Referee: Johan Bronkhorst (Netherlands)

27 November 1960 Second leg	Hamburger SV (West Germany)	3–3	(Switzerland) Young Boys	Volksparkstadion, Hamburg
17:30 CET	Stürmer 13'; Dörfel 72'; Walker 86' (o.g.)	Report	Bigler 21' (pen.); Meier 25'; Schneiter 48'	Attendance: 45,000; Referee: Pieter Paulus Roomer (Netherlands)

Hamburger SV won 8–3 on aggregate.

=== Luzern ===
==== Cup Winners' Cup ====
===== Quarter-finals =====
23 November 1960 First leg	Luzern (Switzerland)	0–3	(Italy) Fiorentina	Stadion Allmend, Lucerne
		Summary	Petris 32'; Hamrin 35', 81'	Attendance: 11,000; Referee: Kurt Tschenscher (West Germany)

28 December 1960 Second leg	Fiorentina (Italy)	6–2	(Switzerland) Luzern	Stadio Comunale, Florence
	Antoninho 28', 52', 75'; Hamrin 33' (pen.), 46'; Milan 38'	Summary	Frey 43'; Hahn 55'	Attendance: 5,000; Referee: Alojz Obtulovič (Czechoslovakia)

Fiorentina won 9–2 on aggregate.

== Sources ==
- Switzerland 1960–61 at RSSSF
- European Competitions 1960–61 at RSSSF.com
- Cup finals at Fussball-Schweiz
- Intertoto history at Pawel Mogielnicki's Page
- Josef Zindel (2018). FC Basel 1893. Die ersten 125 Jahre (in German). Basel: Friedrich Reinhardt Verlag. ISBN 978-3-7245-2305-5.

Preceded by 1959–60	Seasons in Swiss football	Succeeded by 1961–62
