= 1959–60 Heart of Midlothian F.C. season =

Heart of Midlothian
1959–60 season
- Manager: Tommy Walker
- Stadium: Tynecastle Park
- Scottish First Division: 1st
- Scottish Cup: Round 2
- League Cup: Winners

During the 1959–60 season Hearts competed in the Scottish First Division, the Scottish Cup, the Scottish League Cup and the East of Scotland Shield.

== Fixtures ==
=== Friendlies ===
31 August 1959 Friendly	Hearts	8–1	British Army	Tynecastle Park
	Goal

12 October 1959 Friendly	Hearts	0–0	Norwich City	Tynecastle Park

2 April 1960 Friendly	Hearts	3–1	Motherwell	Tynecastle Park
	Goal

25 April 1960 Friendly	Hearts	2–2	Aston Villa	Tynecastle Park
	Goal

14 May 1960 Tour of USA/Canada	Hearts	2–2	Manchester United	Varsity Stadium, Toronto
	Goal

16 May 1960 Tour of USA/Canada	Montreal Cantalia	0–3	Hearts	Lansdowne Park, Ottawa
	Goal

18 May 1960 Tour of USA/Canada	Montreal Concordia	0–2	Hearts	Delorimier Stadium, Montreal
	Goal

22 May 1960 Tour of USA/Canada	Hearts	0–3	Manchester United	New York
	Goal

28 May 1960 Tour of USA/Canada	Hearts	2–3	Manchester United	Empire Stadium, Vancouver
	Goal

1 June 1960 Tour of USA/Canada	Hearts	4–0	Manchester United	Wrigley Field, Los Angeles
	Goal

4 June 1960 Tour of USA/Canada	British Columbia All Stars	2–2	Hearts	Empire Stadium, Vancouver
	Goal

6 June 1960 Tour of USA/Canada	Victoria All Stars	0–3	Hearts	Victoria
	Goal

8 June 1960 Tour of USA/Canada	Alberta All Stars	2–6	Hearts	Edmonton
	Goal

9 June 1960 Tour of USA/Canada	Hearts	1–2	Burnley	Varsity Stadium, Toronto
	Goal

=== East of Scotland Shield ===
18 April 1960 Final	Hearts	2–3	Hibernian	Tynecastle Park

=== League Cup ===
8 August 1959 League Cup Group	Kilmarnock	0–4	Hearts	Rugby Park
				Attendance: 16,378

12 August 1959 League Cup Group	Hearts	2–2	Aberdeen	Tynecastle Park
				Attendance: 21,000

15 August 1959 League Cup Group	Stirling Albion	1–2	Hearts	Annfield Stadium
				Attendance: 11,117

22 August 1959 League Cup Group	Hearts	2–0	Kilmarnock	Tynecastle Park
				Attendance: 28,000

26 August 1959 League Cup Group	Aberdeen	1–4	Hearts	Pittodrie Park
				Attendance: 31,000

29 August 1959 League Cup Group	Hearts	2–2	Stirling Albion	Tynecastle Park
				Attendance: 24,000

9 September 1959 League Cup Quarter-Final 1st Leg	Motherwell	1–1	Hearts	Fir Park
				Attendance: 32,000

16 September 1959 League Cup Quarter-Final 2nd Leg	Hearts	6–2 (7–3 agg.)	Motherwell	Tynecastle Park
				Attendance: 44,000

7 October 1959 League Cup Semi-Final	Cowdenbeath	3–9	Hearts	Easter Road
				Attendance: 27,500

24 October 1959 League Cup Final	Hearts	2–1	Third Lanark	Hampden Park
				Attendance: 57,994

=== Scottish Cup ===
22 February 1960 Scottish Cup R2	Hearts	1–1	Kilmarnock	Tynecastle Park
				Attendance: 33,829

24 February 1960 Scottish Cup R2 Replay	Kilmarnock	2–1	Hearts	Rugby Park
				Attendance: 24,359

=== Scottish First Division ===
19 August 1959 Scottish First Division	Dundee	1–3	Hearts	Dens Park
				Attendance: 18,500

5 September 1959 Scottish First Division	Hearts	2–2	Hibernian	Tynecastle Park
				Attendance: 40,000

12 September 1959 Scottish First Division	Celtic	3–4	Hearts	Celtic Park
				Attendance: 36,000

19 September 1959 Scottish First Division	Hearts	3–1	Dunfermline Athletic	Tynecastle Park
				Attendance: 18,000

26 September 1959 Scottish First Division	Stirling Albion	2–2	Hearts	Annfield Stadium
				Attendance: 10,863

3 October 1959 Scottish First Division	Hearts	5–3	Ayr United	Tynecastle Park
				Attendance: 16,000

10 October 1959 Scottish First Division	Airdrieonians	2–5	Hearts	Broomfield Park
				Attendance: 12,000

17 October 1959 Scottish First Division	Arbroath	1–4	Hearts	Gayfield Park
				Attendance: 6,866

28 October 1959 Scottish First Division	Hearts	6–2	Third Lanark	Tynecastle Park
				Attendance: 20,000

31 October 1959 Scottish First Division	Rangers	0–2	Hearts	Ibrox Park
				Attendance: 70,000

7 November 1959 Scottish First Division	Hearts	5–3	Partick Thistle	Tynecastle Park
				Attendance: 25,000

14 November 1959 Scottish First Division	Hearts	3–1	Kilmarnock	Tynecastle Park
				Attendance: 18,000

21 November 1959 Scottish First Division	Aberdeen	1–3	Hearts	Pittodrie Park
				Attendance: 19,000

28 November 1959 Scottish First Division	Clyde	2–2	Hearts	Shawfield Stadium
				Attendance: 14,000

5 December 1959 Scottish First Division	Hearts	0–2	St Mirren	Tynecastle Park
				Attendance: 25,000

12 December 1959 Scottish First Division	Motherwell	3–0	Hearts	Fir Park
				Attendance: 18,900

19 December 1959 Scottish First Division	Hearts	4–1	Raith Rovers	Tynecastle Park
				Attendance: 24,000

26 December 1959 Scottish First Division	Hearts	3–0	Dundee	Tynecastle Park
				Attendance: 16,000

1 January 1960 Scottish First Division	Hibernian	1–5	Hearts	Easter Road
				Attendance: 54,000

2 January 1960 Scottish First Division	Hearts	3–1	Celtic	Tynecastle Park
				Attendance: 26,000

9 January 1960 Scottish First Division	Dunfermline Athletic	2–2	Hearts	East End Park
				Attendance: 13,000

16 January 1960 Scottish First Division	Hearts	4–0	Stirling Albion	Tynecastle Park
				Attendance: 22,000

23 January 1960 Scottish First Division	Ayr United	1–1	Hearts	Somerset Park
				Attendance: 17,000

30 January 1960 Scottish First Division	Hearts	1–1	Motherwell	Tynecastle Park
				Attendance: 18,000

6 February 1960 Scottish First Division	Hearts	3–2	Airdrieonians	Tynecastle Park
				Attendance: 22,000

27 February 1960 Scottish First Division	Third Lanark	1–4	Hearts	Cathkin Park
				Attendance: 14,000

5 March 1960 Scottish First Division	Hearts	2–0	Rangers	Tynecastle Park
				Attendance: 45,000

9 March 1960 Scottish First Division	Hearts	4–1	Arbroath	Tynecastle Park
				Attendance: 12,000

15 March 1960 Scottish First Division	Partick Thistle	1–2	Hearts	Firhill Park
				Attendance: 12,000

19 March 1960 Scottish First Division	Kilmarnock	2–1	Hearts	Rugby Park
				Attendance: 26,584

26 March 1960 Scottish First Division	Hearts	3–0	Aberdeen	Tynecastle Park
				Attendance: 15,000

5 April 1960 Scottish First Division	Hearts	5–2	Clyde	Tynecastle Park
				Attendance: 30,000

16 April 1960 Scottish First Division	St Mirren	4–4	Hearts	St Mirren Park, Love Street
				Attendance: 17,000

30 April 1960 Scottish First Division	Raith Rovers	2–2	Hearts	Stark's Park
				Attendance: 5,000

== See also ==
- List of Heart of Midlothian F.C. seasons
