= Erik Jensen (footballer) =

Danish footballer (1932–1992)

Personal information
- Full name: Erik Bechmann Jensen
- Date of birth: 2 March 1932
- Date of death: 7 February 1992 (aged 59)
- Position: Forward

Senior career*
Years	Team	Apps	(Gls)
1950–1962	AGF		

International career
	Denmark U19	1	(2)
1952–1953	Denmark U21	3	(2)
1955–1957	Denmark	4	(0)
- * Club domestic league appearances and goals

Erik Bechmann Jensen (2 March 1932 – 7 February 1992) was a Danish footballer who played as a forward. He made four appearances for the Denmark national team from 1955 to 1957.

He spent his entire career at AGF, playing alongside his brother John Jensen.

== Honours ==
AGF

- Danish 1st Division: 1954–55, 1955–56, 1956–57, 1960
- Danish Cup: 1954–55, 1956–57, 1959–60, 1960–61
