= 1959–60 in Swiss football =

Football in Switzerland
- Season: 1959–60

Men's football
- Nationalliga A: Young Boys
- Nationalliga B: Fribourg
- 1. Liga: 1. Liga champions: Martigny-Sports; Group West: FC Martigny-Sports; Group Cenral: FC Nordstern Basel; Group South and East: FC Bodio
- Swiss Cup: Luzern

The following is a summary of the 1959–60 season of competitive football in Switzerland.

== Nationalliga A ==
=== Final league table ===
| Pos | Team | Pld | W | D | L | GF | GA | GD | Pts | Qualification |
|---|---|---|---|---|---|---|---|---|---|---|
| 1 | Young Boys | 26 | 20 | 2 | 4 | 86 | 44 | +42 | 42 | Swiss Champions qualified for 1960–61 European Cup |
| 2 | Biel-Bienne | 26 | 14 | 8 | 4 | 61 | 38 | +23 | 36 | |
| 3 | La Chaux-de-Fonds | 26 | 14 | 4 | 8 | 71 | 51 | +20 | 32 | |
| 4 | Zürich | 26 | 13 | 5 | 8 | 64 | 44 | +20 | 31 | |
| 5 | Luzern | 26 | 11 | 5 | 10 | 65 | 62 | +3 | 27 | Swiss Cup winners qualified for 1960–61 Cup Winners' Cup |
| 6 | Winterthur | 26 | 12 | 3 | 11 | 40 | 40 | 0 | 27 | |
| 7 | Servette | 26 | 8 | 9 | 9 | 46 | 39 | +7 | 25 | |
| 8 | Grasshopper Club | 26 | 8 | 8 | 10 | 54 | 61 | −7 | 24 | |
| 9 | Chiasso | 26 | 8 | 7 | 11 | 39 | 57 | −18 | 23 | |
| 10 | Basel | 26 | 6 | 10 | 10 | 46 | 55 | −9 | 22 | |
| 11 | Grenchen | 26 | 8 | 5 | 13 | 51 | 48 | +3 | 21 | |
| 12 | Lausanne-Sport | 26 | 7 | 7 | 12 | 41 | 74 | −33 | 21 | |
| 13 | Lugano | 26 | 6 | 6 | 14 | 34 | 52 | −18 | 18 | Relegated to 1960–61 Nationalliga B |
| 14 | Bellinzona | 26 | 4 | 7 | 15 | 28 | 61 | −33 | 15 | Relegated to 1960–61 Nationalliga B |

Source: rsssf.com
Rules for classification: 1) Points; 2) Goal difference within the league, however with play-off for qualifiers;

== Nationalliga B ==
=== Final league table ===
| Pos | Team | Pld | W | D | L | GF | GA | GD | Pts | Qualification or relegation |
|---|---|---|---|---|---|---|---|---|---|---|
| 1 | Young Fellows Zürich | 26 | 16 | 5 | 5 | 55 | 34 | +21 | 37 | To play-off for title |
| 2 | FC Fribourg | 26 | 16 | 5 | 5 | 50 | 31 | +19 | 37 | To play-off for title |
| 3 | SC Brühl | 26 | 12 | 7 | 7 | 50 | 51 | −1 | 31 | |
| 4 | Yverdon-Sport FC | 26 | 10 | 9 | 7 | 49 | 41 | +8 | 29 | |
| 5 | FC Bern | 26 | 10 | 9 | 7 | 52 | 52 | 0 | 29 | |
| 6 | FC Thun | 26 | 11 | 5 | 10 | 62 | 43 | +19 | 27 | |
| 7 | Urania Genève Sport | 26 | 11 | 3 | 12 | 56 | 51 | +5 | 25 | |
| 8 | Vevey Sports | 26 | 7 | 10 | 9 | 54 | 49 | +5 | 24 | |
| 9 | FC Sion | 26 | 10 | 3 | 13 | 54 | 52 | +2 | 23 | |
| 10 | FC Aarau | 26 | 9 | 5 | 12 | 45 | 50 | −5 | 23 | |
| 11 | FC Schaffhausen | 26 | 9 | 5 | 12 | 39 | 45 | −6 | 23 | |
| 12 | FC Cantonal Neuchâtel | 26 | 8 | 6 | 12 | 48 | 55 | −7 | 22 | |
| 13 | FC Langenthal | 26 | 7 | 7 | 12 | 29 | 42 | −13 | 21 | Relegated to 1960–61 1. Liga |
| 14 | Lengnau | 26 | 2 | 9 | 15 | 33 | 80 | −47 | 13 | Relegated to 1960–61 1. Liga |

Source: rsssf.com
Rules for classification: 1) Points; 2) Goal difference within the league, however with play-off for qualifiers;

=== Play-off for title ===
Young Fellows Zürich and FC Fribourg finished level on points in joint first position and had both achieved promotion to 1960–61 Nationalliga A. However, it required a play-off to decide the title as NLB champions and this took place on 15 June 1960 in Wankdorf Stadium, Bern.

| Team 1 | Score | Team 2 |
|---|---|---|
| Young Fellows Zürich | 1–4 | FC Fribourg |

FC Fribourg won the NLB championship.

== 1. Liga ==
=== Group West ===
| Pos | Team | Pld | W | D | L | GF | GA | GD | Pts | Qualification or relegation |
|---|---|---|---|---|---|---|---|---|---|---|
| 1 | FC Martigny-Sports | 22 | 15 | 4 | 3 | 56 | 24 | +32 | 34 | Play-off to Nationalliga B |
| 2 | FC Versoix | 22 | 13 | 2 | 7 | 59 | 44 | +15 | 28 | |
| 3 | FC Sierre | 22 | 12 | 3 | 7 | 54 | 47 | +7 | 27 | |
| 4 | FC Solothurn | 22 | 11 | 3 | 8 | 56 | 37 | +19 | 25 | |
| 5 | Etoile Carouge FC | 22 | 11 | 2 | 9 | 54 | 51 | +3 | 24 | |
| 6 | FC Stade Payerne | 22 | 10 | 3 | 9 | 37 | 56 | −19 | 23 | |
| 7 | FC Forward Morges | 22 | 7 | 6 | 9 | 41 | 45 | −4 | 20 | |
| 8 | FC Monthey | 22 | 7 | 5 | 10 | 47 | 44 | +3 | 19 | |
| 9 | ES FC Malley | 22 | 5 | 8 | 9 | 34 | 43 | −9 | 18 | |
| 10 | FC Bözingen 34 | 22 | 7 | 4 | 11 | 40 | 57 | −17 | 18 | |
| 11 | US Bienne-Boujean | 22 | 6 | 3 | 13 | 36 | 45 | −9 | 15 | Play-out against relegation |
| 12 | SC Derendingen | 22 | 4 | 5 | 13 | 32 | 47 | −15 | 13 | Relegation to 2. Liga |

Source: RSSSF
Rules for classification: 1) Points; 2) Goal difference within the league, but decider play-off for qualifiers.

=== Group Central ===
| Pos | Team | Pld | W | D | L | GF | GA | GD | Pts | Qualification or relegation |
|---|---|---|---|---|---|---|---|---|---|---|
| 1 | FC Nordstern Basel | 22 | 13 | 3 | 6 | 59 | 32 | +27 | 29 | Play-off to Nationalliga B |
| 2 | FC Alle | 22 | 10 | 7 | 5 | 42 | 29 | +13 | 27 | |
| 3 | FC Moutier | 22 | 9 | 8 | 5 | 49 | 32 | +17 | 26 | |
| 4 | BSC Old Boys | 22 | 10 | 6 | 6 | 35 | 39 | −4 | 26 | |
| 5 | FC Concordia Basel | 22 | 10 | 4 | 8 | 48 | 38 | +10 | 24 | |
| 6 | SC Burgdorf | 22 | 8 | 7 | 7 | 42 | 30 | +12 | 23 | |
| 7 | FC Porrentruy | 22 | 8 | 4 | 10 | 49 | 47 | +2 | 20 | |
| 8 | FC Baden | 22 | 7 | 6 | 9 | 31 | 34 | −3 | 20 | |
| 9 | FC Bassecourt | 22 | 7 | 6 | 9 | 35 | 40 | −5 | 20 | |
| 10 | SR Delémont | 22 | 8 | 4 | 10 | 31 | 50 | −19 | 20 | |
| 11 | FC Wettingen | 22 | 6 | 7 | 9 | 33 | 40 | −7 | 19 | Play-out against relegation |
| 12 | FC Olten | 22 | 3 | 4 | 15 | 30 | 73 | −43 | 10 | Relegation to 2. Liga |

Source: RSSSF
Rules for classification: 1) Points; 2) Goal difference within the league, but decider play-off for qualifiers.

=== Group South and East ===
| Pos | Team | Pld | W | D | L | GF | GA | GD | Pts | Qualification or relegation |
|---|---|---|---|---|---|---|---|---|---|---|
| 1 | FC Blue Stars Zürich | 22 | 15 | 2 | 5 | 65 | 30 | +35 | 32 | Decider for first position |
| 2 | FC Bodio | 22 | 13 | 6 | 3 | 42 | 26 | +16 | 32 | Decider for first position |
| 3 | FC St. Gallen | 22 | 12 | 3 | 7 | 56 | 34 | +22 | 27 | |
| 4 | FC Emmenbrücke | 22 | 11 | 3 | 8 | 43 | 46 | −3 | 25 | |
| 5 | FC Rapid Lugano | 22 | 7 | 8 | 7 | 40 | 33 | +7 | 22 | |
| 6 | FC Red Star Zürich | 22 | 8 | 6 | 8 | 43 | 45 | −2 | 22 | |
| 7 | FC Solduno | 22 | 8 | 5 | 9 | 36 | 35 | +1 | 21 | |
| 8 | FC Locarno | 22 | 8 | 4 | 10 | 33 | 42 | −9 | 20 | |
| 9 | FC Dietikon | 22 | 7 | 4 | 11 | 41 | 42 | −1 | 18 | Decider for eleventh position |
| 10 | SV Höngg | 22 | 6 | 6 | 10 | 22 | 38 | −16 | 18 | Decider for eleventh position |
| 11 | FC Wil | 22 | 8 | 2 | 12 | 25 | 41 | −16 | 18 | Decider for eleventh position |
| 12 | Mendrisiostar | 22 | 1 | 7 | 14 | 16 | 50 | −34 | 9 | Relegation to 2. Liga |

Source: RSSSF
Rules for classification: 1) Points; 2) Goal difference within the league, but decider play-off for qualifiers.

==== Decider for first place ====
The decider match for first place and division championship was played on 12 June 1960 in Olten.

| Team 1 | Score | Team 2 |
|---|---|---|
| FC Bodio | 1–0 | Blue Stars |

FC Bodio win group championship and advance to play-offs for promotion. Blue Stars remain in the division.

==== Decider for eleventh position ====
The play-outs were played on 12, 15 and 19 June.

| Pos | Team | Pld | W | D | L | GF | GA | GD | Pts | Qualification | DIE | WIL | HÖN |
|---|---|---|---|---|---|---|---|---|---|---|---|---|---|
| 1 | FC Dietikon | 2 | 1 | 1 | 0 | 4 | 1 | +3 | 3 | | — | — | 1–1 |
| 2 | FC Wil | 2 | 1 | 0 | 1 | 6 | 6 | 0 | 2 | | 0–3 | — | — |
| 3 | SV Höngg | 2 | 0 | 1 | 1 | 4 | 7 | −3 | 1 | Play-out against relegation | — | 3–6 | — |

Source: RSSSF
Rules for classification: 1) Points; 2) Head-to-head 3) Decider.

FC Dietikon and FC Wil remain in division. SV Höngg continue in play-outs against relegation.

=== Promotion, relegation ===
==== Play-off for promotion ====
The play-offs for the two promotion slots were played on 12, 15 and 19 June.

| Pos | Team | Pld | W | D | L | GF | GA | GD | Pts | Qualification | MAS | NOR | BOD |
|---|---|---|---|---|---|---|---|---|---|---|---|---|---|
| 1 | FC Martigny-Sports | 2 | 2 | 0 | 0 | 6 | 2 | +4 | 4 | Champions | — | 4–1 | — |
| 2 | FC Nordstern Basel | 2 | 1 | 0 | 1 | 7 | 7 | 0 | 2 | Promoted | — | — | 6–3 |
| 3 | FC Bodio | 2 | 0 | 0 | 2 | 4 | 8 | −4 | 0 | | 1–2 | — | — |

Source: RSSSF
Rules for classification: 1) Points; 2) Head-to-head 3) Decider.

Martigny-Sports become 1. Liga champions and together with Nordstern are promoted to 1960–61 Nationalliga B.

==== Play-out against relegation ====
The play-outs were played on 12 and 26 June.

| Pos | Team | Pld | W | D | L | GF | GA | GD | Pts | Qualification or relegation | HÖN | WET | BBB |
|---|---|---|---|---|---|---|---|---|---|---|---|---|---|
| 1 | SV Höngg | 1 | 1 | 0 | 0 | 4 | 0 | +4 | 2 | | — | — | 4–0 |
| 2 | FC Wettingen | 1 | 1 | 0 | 0 | 3 | 2 | +1 | 2 | | n/p | — | — |
| 3 | US Bienne-Boujean | 2 | 0 | 0 | 2 | 2 | 7 | −5 | 0 | Relegation to 2. Liga | — | 2–3 | — |

Source: RSSSF
Rules for classification: 1) Points; 2) Head-to-head 3) Decider.

The match Wettingen–Höngg was not played, both teams remain in division. As fourth and final team US Bienne-Boujean are relegated to 2. Liga.

== Swiss Cup ==
The competition was played in a knockout system. In the case of a draw, extra time was played. If the teams were still level after extra time, the match was replayed at the away team's ground. In the replay, if the teams were still level after extra time, the match was replayed at a neutral ground. Here in case of a draw after extra time, a toss of the coin would decide which team progressed.

=== Early rounds ===
The routes of the finalists to the final were:

- Second round: teams from the NLA and NLB with byes.
- Third round: Luzern–Wädenswil 6:1. Minerva Bern–Grenchen 0:7.
- Fourth round: Luzern–Young Fellows 3:2. Olten–Grenchen 2:7.
- Fifth round: Luzern–Bern 4:1. Fribourg–Grenchen 3:3 (a.e.t.). Wiederholung: Grenchen–Fribourg 3:1.
- Quarter-finals: Luzern–Thun 6:0. Grenchen–La Chaux-de-Fonds 1:0.
- Semi-finals: Luzern–YB 3:1. Grenchen–Zürich 2:2 (a.e.t.). First replay: Zürich–Grenchen 2:2 (a.e.t.). Second replay (in Bern): Grenchen–Zürich 4:0.

=== Final ===
The final was held at the former Wankdorf Stadium on Sunday 8 May 1960.

8 May 1960

| Luzern | 1–0 | Grenchen |
|---|---|---|
| Blättler 82' | Summary |

Wankdorf Stadium, Bern
Attendance: 30,000
Referee: (Switzerland) Paul Wyssling (Zürich)

This was the very first title in FC Luzern's history. As Cup winners they qualified for the first edition of the Cup Winners' Cup which was to be contested in the following season.

== Swiss Clubs in Europe ==
This was the fifth season with the European Cup.

- Young Boys as 1958–59 Nationalliga A champions: 1959–60 European Cup

=== Young Boys ===
==== European Cup ====
===== Preliminary round =====
- The Young Boys were drawn a bye.

===== First round =====
| 4 November 1959 First leg | Young Boys (Switzerland) | 1–4 | (West Germany) Eintracht Frankfurt | Wankdorf, Bern |
| 20:00 CET | Meier 23' | Report | Weilbächer 4'; Stein 72'; Bäumler 76' (pen.); Meier 82' | Attendance: 33,322; Referee: Daniel Zariquiegui (Spain) |

| 25 November 1959 Second leg | Eintracht Frankfurt (West Germany) | 1–1 | (Switzerland) Young Boys | Waldstadion, Frankfurt-am-Main |
| 20:00 CET | Bäumler 68' (pen.) | Report | Schneider 90' | Attendance: 30,800; Referee: José Blanco Pérez (Spain) |

Eintracht Frankfurt won 5–2 on aggregate.

== Sources ==
- Switzerland 1959–60 at RSSSF
- European Competitions 1959–60 at RSSSF.com
- Cup finals at Fussball-Schweiz
- Intertoto history at Pawel Mogielnicki's Page
- Josef Zindel (2018). FC Basel 1893. Die ersten 125 Jahre (in German). Basel: Friedrich Reinhardt Verlag. ISBN 978-3-7245-2305-5.

| Preceded by 1958–59 | Seasons in Swiss football | Succeeded by 1960–61 |
