= Rustichelli =

Rustichelli is a surname. Notable people with the surname include:

- Alida Rustichelli alias Alida Chelli (1943–2012), Italian actress and singer
- Carlo Rustichelli (1916–2004), Italian composer
- Dominique Rustichelli (born 1934), French soccer player
- Paolo Rustichelli (born 1953), Italian-American pianist, composer, and producer

== See also ==
- 38541 Rustichelli, main-belt asteroid
- Rustichello da Pisa, 13th century Italian romance writer
