= John Jensen (footballer, born 1937) =

Danish footballer (1937–2012)

Personal information
- Full name: John Bernhard Bechmann Jensen
- Date of birth: 13 May 1937
- Place of birth: Aarhus, Denmark
- Date of death: 6 September 2012 (aged 75)
- Position: Forward

Senior career*
Years	Team	Apps	(Gls)
1955–1963	AGF		

International career
1956–1959	Denmark U21	5	(4)
1957–1958	Denmark	4	(1)
- * Club domestic league appearances and goals

John Bernhard Bechmann Jensen (13 May 1937 – 6 September 2012) was a Danish footballer who played as a forward. He made four appearances for the Denmark national team from 1957 to 1958. He was also named in Denmark's squad for the qualification tournament for the 1958 FIFA World Cup.

He spent his entire career at AGF, playing alongside his brother Erik Jensen.

== Honours ==
AGF

- Danish 1st Division: 1955–56, 1956–57, 1960
- Danish Cup: 1956–57, 1959–60, 1960–61
