= 1956–57 Danish Cup =

Tournament details
- Country: Denmark

Final positions
- Champions: AGF
- Runners-up: Esbjerg fB

The 1956–57 Danish Cup was the 3rd installment of the Danish Cup, the highest football competition in Denmark. The final was played on 28 April 1957.

== First round ==
Team 1	Score	Team 2
Bagenkop IF	4–2	Haarby BK
Borup FF	5–1	Skelund IF
Brønderslev IF	3–4	Vejgaard BSK
BK Dalgas	7–3	Rødby fB
Esbjerg B 1929	6–2	Bogense G&IF
Frem Sakskøbing	5–3	Holbæk B&I
Glamsbjerg IF	2–3	Odense KFUM
Grenaa IF	0–2	Nibe BK
Handelsstandes BK	2–0	Rønne IK
Holte IF	10–4	Præstø IF
Humlebæk BK	3–1	BK Hekla
Husum BK	5–3	Tølløse BK
Hvidovre IF	3–2	Frederikssund IK
Kastrup BK	3–2 (a.e.t.)	Frederiksberg BK
Kolding IF	1–0	Nyborg G&IF
Kølkær G&IF	2–14	Nørre Aaby IK
Nørresundby BK	1–2	Herning Fremad
Nykøbing Mors IF	3–4	Silkeborg IF
Roskilde BK	9–3	Tuse Næs BK
BK Rødovre	5–1	Brøndbyvester IF
Skive IK	2–3	Vorup Frederiksberg BK
Store Heddinge BK	2–5	Østerbros Boldklub
Sundby BK	1–2	Korsør BK
Svendborg BK	2–3	Varde BK
BK Velo	3–5	Frederiksborg IF
Viborg FF	4–0	Skagen IK
Aabenraa BK	4–3 (a.e.t.)	Fredericia KFUM

== Second round ==
Team 1	Score	Team 2
B 1908	1–0 (a.e.t.)	Handelsstandes BK
Bagenkop IF	3–4	IK Viking Rønne
Borup FF	1–4	Østerbros Boldklub
Esbjerg B 1929	4–1	Vejgaard BSK
Frem Sakskøbing	2–1	Husum BK
Herning Fremad	1–2	Viborg FF
Holte IF	1–3	B 1921
Kastrup BK	1–4	Nørre Aaby IK
Korsør BK	5–0	Aabenraa BK
Nibe BK	4–2	Kolding IF
Odense KFUM	4–2	Vejen SF
Roskilde BK	1–3	Vorup Frederiksberg BK
BK Rødovre	3–4	BK Dalgas
Silkeborg IF	3–4	Frederiksborg IF
IF Skjold Birkerød	3–2	Hvidovre IF
Varde BK	5–9	Humlebæk BK

== Third round ==
Team 1	Score	Team 2
B 1901	6–3	Frederiksborg IF
Brande IF	2–4	B 1921
Frederikshavn fI	2–5 (a.e.t.)	Helsingør IF
Frem Sakskøbing	2–4	Østerbros Boldklub
Fremad Amager	5–3	Esbjerg B 1929
Hellerup IK	3–1	Odense KFUM
KFUM København	2–3 (a.e.t.)	Viborg FF
Korsør BK	3–1	B 1908
Lendemark BK	0–11	Ikast FS
Nibe BK	4–6	Brønshøj BK
Næstved IF	7–2	BK Dalgas
Otterup B&IK	1–3	IF Skjold Birkerød
Randers Freja	4–0	Nørre Aaby IK
IK Viking Rønne	1–0	AaB
Vorup Frederiksberg BK	3–1	Humlebæk BK
Aalborg Chang	5–2	Nakskov BK

== Fourth round ==
Team 1	Score	Team 2
AB	3–2	Skovshoved IF
AGF	6–0	IF Skjold Birkerød
IF AIA-Tranbjerg	2–2 (a.e.t.) (4–3 p)	Næstved IF
B 1901	1–3	Fremad Amager
B 1903	3–1	Østerbros Boldklub
B 1909	0–0 (a.e.t.) (3–2 p)	B.93
B 1913	4–2	B 1921
Brønshøj BK	3–2	Odense BK
Esbjerg fB	3–2	Viborg FF
BK Frem	3–0	Randers Freja
Ikast FS	1–5	Horsens fS
KB	2–1	Hellerup IK
Korsør BK	0–1	Vanløse IF
Køge BK	3–2	Vorup Frederiksberg BK
Vejle BK	4–1	Helsingør IF
IK Viking Rønne	2–8	Aalborg Chang

== Fifth round ==
Team 1	Score	Team 2
B 1913	3–6	B 1909
Esbjerg fB	0–0 (a.e.t.) (6–5 p)	KB
BK Frem	6–5	Aalborg Chang
Fremad Amager	1–5	AGF
Brønshøj BK	1–0	Køge BK
B 1903	2–1 (a.e.t.)	IF AIA-Tranbjerg
Vejle BK	5–1	AB
Vanløse IF	2–3	Horsens fS

== Quarter-finals ==
Team 1	Score	Team 2
B 1903	2–3	Esbjerg fB
BK Frem	2–0	Brønshøj BK
Horsens fS	3–2	B 1909
Vejle BK	1–2	AGF

== Semi-finals ==
Team 1	Score	Team 2
AGF	4–1	BK Frem
Horsens fS	1–3	Esbjerg fB

== Final ==
28 April 1957

AGF	2–0	Esbjerg fB
E. Jensen 82'; J. Jensen 85'	Report

Københavns Idrætspark, Copenhagen
Attendance: 25,800
Referee: Leo Helge
