= 1959–60 Scottish Division One =

54th season of top-tier football league in Scotland

Scottish Division One
- Season: 1959–60
- Champions: Heart of Midlothian
- Relegated: Stirling Albion; Arbroath

The 1959–60 Scottish Division One was won by Heart of Midlothian by four points over nearest rival Kilmarnock. Stirling Albion and Arbroath finished 17th and 18th respectively and were relegated to the 1960-61 Second Division.

== League table ==
| Pos | Team | Pld | W | D | L | GF | GA | GR | Pts | Qualification or relegation |
|---|---|---|---|---|---|---|---|---|---|---|
| 1 | Heart of Midlothian (C) | 34 | 23 | 8 | 3 | 102 | 51 | 2.000 | 54 | Qualified for the European Cup |
| 2 | Kilmarnock | 34 | 24 | 2 | 8 | 67 | 45 | 1.489 | 50 | |
| 3 | Rangers | 34 | 17 | 8 | 9 | 72 | 38 | 1.895 | 42 | Qualified for the Cup Winners' Cup |
| 4 | Dundee | 34 | 16 | 10 | 8 | 70 | 49 | 1.429 | 42 | |
| 5 | Motherwell | 34 | 16 | 8 | 10 | 71 | 61 | 1.164 | 40 | |
| 6 | Clyde | 34 | 15 | 9 | 10 | 77 | 69 | 1.116 | 39 | |
| 7 | Hibernian | 34 | 14 | 7 | 13 | 106 | 85 | 1.247 | 35 | Invited for the Inter-Cities Fairs Cup |
| 8 | Ayr United | 34 | 14 | 6 | 14 | 65 | 73 | 0.890 | 34 | |
| 9 | Celtic | 34 | 12 | 9 | 13 | 73 | 59 | 1.237 | 33 | |
| 10 | Partick Thistle | 34 | 14 | 4 | 16 | 54 | 78 | 0.692 | 32 | |
| 11 | Raith Rovers | 34 | 14 | 3 | 17 | 64 | 62 | 1.032 | 31 | |
| 12 | Third Lanark | 34 | 13 | 4 | 17 | 75 | 83 | 0.904 | 30 | |
| 13 | Dunfermline Athletic | 34 | 10 | 9 | 15 | 72 | 80 | 0.900 | 29 | |
| 14 | St Mirren | 34 | 11 | 6 | 17 | 78 | 86 | 0.907 | 28 | |
| 15 | Aberdeen | 34 | 11 | 6 | 17 | 54 | 72 | 0.750 | 28 | |
| 16 | Airdrieonians | 34 | 11 | 6 | 17 | 56 | 80 | 0.700 | 28 | |
| 17 | Stirling Albion (R) | 34 | 7 | 8 | 19 | 55 | 72 | 0.764 | 22 | Relegated to the Second Division |
| 18 | Arbroath (R) | 34 | 4 | 7 | 23 | 38 | 106 | 0.358 | 15 | Relegated to the Second Division |

Source: RSSSF
(C) Champions; (R) Relegated

== Results ==
| Home \ Away | ABE | AIR | ARB | AYR | CEL | CLY | DND | DNF | HOM | HIB | KIL | MOT | PAR | RAI | RAN | STM | STI | THI |
|---|---|---|---|---|---|---|---|---|---|---|---|---|---|---|---|---|---|---|
| Aberdeen | | 2–2 | 0–0 | 2–0 | 3–2 | 0–2 | 0–3 | 1–1 | 1–3 | 6–4 | 0–1 | 2–2 | 5–2 | 4–2 | 0–5 | 3–1 | 3–1 | 3–1 |
| Airdrieonians | 1–0 | | 2–1 | 1–2 | 2–5 | 2–4 | 3–3 | 6–3 | 2–5 | 1–11 | 1–3 | 0–1 | 3–0 | 1–2 | 0–5 | 1–3 | 2–4 | 3–2 |
| Arbroath | 1–3 | 1–1 | | 1–1 | 0–5 | 2–3 | 1–1 | 2–2 | 1–4 | 2–3 | 0–3 | 3–1 | 2–2 | 1–2 | 0–4 | 6–2 | 4–3 | 2–1 |
| Ayr United | 2–1 | 1–0 | 1–0 | | 1–1 | 1–2 | 1–0 | 3–3 | 1–1 | 2–1 | 1–3 | 5–2 | 4–1 | 4–0 | 2–4 | 4–3 | 1–1 | 2–3 |
| Celtic | 1–1 | 0–1 | 4–0 | 2–3 | | 1–1 | 2–3 | 4–2 | 3–4 | 1–0 | 2–0 | 5–1 | 2–4 | 1–0 | 0–1 | 3–3 | 1–1 | 4–0 |
| Clyde | 7–2 | 1–2 | 2–1 | 3–0 | 3–3 | | 1–1 | 1–3 | 2–2 | 2–1 | 1–2 | 1–4 | 1–0 | 6–1 | 4–1 | 2–2 | 2–2 | 2–3 |
| Dundee | 4–1 | 1–2 | 5–0 | 3–1 | 2–0 | 2–0 | | 3–2 | 1–3 | 6–3 | 0–4 | 1–1 | 3–0 | 0–2 | 1–3 | 3–1 | 4–1 | 2–1 |
| Dunfermline Athletic | 1–3 | 1–0 | 5–1 | 3–4 | 3–2 | 4–5 | 2–2 | | 2–2 | 2–2 | 1–0 | 6–0 | 3–3 | 0–2 | 0–5 | 2–1 | 1–1 | 3–1 |
| Heart of Midlothian | 3–0 | 3–2 | 4–1 | 5–3 | 3–1 | 5–2 | 3–0 | 5–1 | | 2–2 | 3–1 | 1–1 | 5–3 | 4–1 | 2–0 | 0–2 | 4–0 | 6–2 |
| Hibernian | 2–1 | 3–3 | 5–0 | 5–1 | 3–3 | 5–5 | 4–2 | 7–4 | 1–5 | | 4–2 | 1–3 | 2–2 | 0–3 | 0–1 | 1–3 | 3–1 | 6–0 |
| Kilmarnock | 2–0 | 1–0 | 3–2 | 2–0 | 2–1 | 0–2 | 2–2 | 3–2 | 2–1 | 3–1 | | 2–0 | 5–1 | 1–0 | 1–1 | 0–5 | 2–0 | 3–2 |
| Motherwell | 3–1 | 4–1 | 6–0 | 3–3 | 1–2 | 3–2 | 0–0 | 1–1 | 3–0 | 3–4 | 1–2 | | 4–0 | 2–1 | 2–1 | 1–4 | 2–1 | 3–3 |
| Partick Thistle | 1–0 | 0–3 | 2–0 | 3–1 | 3–1 | 0–1 | 0–5 | 2–0 | 1–2 | 2–10 | 3–2 | 1–2 | | 1–0 | 0–3 | 4–2 | 1–0 | 2–0 |
| Raith Rovers | 5–1 | 2–3 | 5–0 | 2–0 | 0–3 | 3–1 | 1–1 | 3–2 | 2–2 | 4–2 | 0–2 | 1–1 | 1–2 | | 1–2 | 6–1 | 0–1 | 2–3 |
| Rangers | 2–2 | 0–0 | 1–1 | 0–3 | 3–1 | 6–0 | 0–0 | 4–1 | 0–2 | 1–1 | 5–0 | 0–2 | 1–1 | 2–3 | | 1–3 | 3–0 | 1–2 |
| St Mirren | 3–0 | 1–2 | 8–1 | 4–3 | 0–3 | 2–2 | 2–3 | 0–2 | 4–4 | 2–3 | 0–3 | 5–1 | 2–4 | 3–2 | 1–1 | | 0–7 | 1–3 |
| Stirling Albion | 0–2 | 1–2 | 5–0 | 3–4 | 2–2 | 1–1 | 0–1 | 1–4 | 2–2 | 2–3 | 0–1 | 0–3 | 2–1 | 4–2 | 2–3 | 3–2 | | 0–3 |
| Third Lanark | 2–1 | 4–2 | 7–1 | 5–0 | 4–2 | 2–3 | 2–2 | 2–0 | 1–4 | 5–3 | 3–4 | 1–4 | 1–2 | 1–3 | 0–2 | 2–2 | 3–3 | |

Legend: Blue = home team win; Yellow = draw; Red = away team win.
