= Helmut Nowak =

Polish footballer (1938–2020)

Personal information
- Date of birth: 20 January 1938
- Place of birth: Szombierki, Poland
- Date of death: 23 February 2020 (aged 82)
- Place of death: Bytom, Poland
- Height: 1.71 m (5 ft 7 in)
- Position: Forward

Senior career*
| Years | Team | Apps | (Gls) |
| 1950–1958 | Szombierki Bytom | | |
| 1959–1962 | Legia Warsaw | | |
| 1963–1972 | Szombierki Bytom | | |

International career
| 1956–1957 | Poland | 2 | (0) |
- * Club domestic league appearances and goals

Helmut Nowak (20 January 1938 – 23 February 2020) was a Polish footballer who played as a forward.

He made two appearances for the Poland national team from 1956 to 1957.

== Honours ==
Szombierki Bytom

- II liga: 1962–63
