= John Amdisen =

Danish footballer (1934–1997)

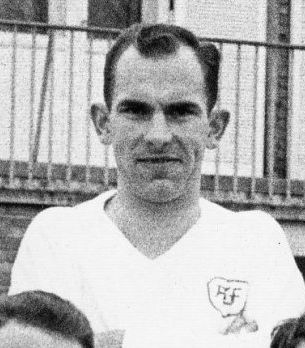
John Amdisen in 1960

John Amdisen (8 July 1934 – 14 January 1997) was a Danish association football player. During his club career he played for Aarhus Gymnastik Forening. He earned 9 caps for the Denmark national football team, and was in the finals squad for the 1964 European Nations' Cup. He also played two games for the Denmark national under-21 football team.
