= Dominique Rustichelli =

French footballer (1934–1979)

Personal information
- Date of birth: 26 June 1934
- Place of birth: Marseille, France
- Date of death: 1 November 1979 (aged 45)
- Place of death: 12th arrondissement, Paris, France
- Height: 1.72 m (5 ft 8 in)
- Position: Striker

Senior career*
Years	Team	Apps	(Gls)
1951–1952	US Le Rouet		
1952–1958	Marseille	138	(34)
1958–1959	Sedan-Torcy	50	(12)
1959–1960	Strasbourg	17	(3)
1960–1961	Reims		
1961–1965	Nice	134	(34)
1965–1967	Stade Français Paris		
1967–1968	Lille	7	(0)
1968–1971	Rouen	78	(22)
1971–1972	Paris Joinville		
- * Club domestic league appearances and goals

Dominique Rustichelli (26 June 1934 – 1 November 1979) was a French professional footballer who played as a striker. Between 1952 and 1958 he played for Olympique de Marseille, scoring 34 goals in 138 league appearances. He then played in a number of other teams before retiring. He died on 1 November 1979.
