= Léon Walker =

Swiss footballer and manager (1937–2006)

Personal information
- Date of birth: 29 July 1937
- Place of birth: Brig-Glis, Switzerland
- Date of death: 29 October 2006 (aged 69)
- Place of death: Sion, Switzerland
- Position: Defender

Senior career*
Years	Team	Apps	(Gls)
1956–1963	Young Boys		
1963–1964	Sion		
1964–1966	Young Boys		
1966	Luzern		
1966–1970	Sion		

International career
1959	Switzerland	1	(0)

Managerial career
- Switzerland U21
- 1979–1980: Switzerland
- * Club domestic league appearances and goals

Léon Walker (29 July 1937 – 29 October 2006) was a Swiss football player and manager.

== Playing career ==
Walker began his career at Young Boys in 1959, joining Sion in 1963. He found himself back at Young Boys the following year, joining Luzern in 1966 for a short spell. He rejoined Sion in 1966, retiring at the club in 1970.

On 4 October 1959, Walker made his debut for Switzerland in a 4–0 defeat against West Germany. The defeat was Walker's only appearance for his country.

== Managerial career ==
Following his retirement, Walker moved into coaching, managing Switzerland's under-21's. In 1979, he was appointed manager of the senior Switzerland team. He managed Switzerland for sixteen games, winning four, drawing once and losing eleven games.
