= Richard Dürr =

Swiss footballer (1938–2014)

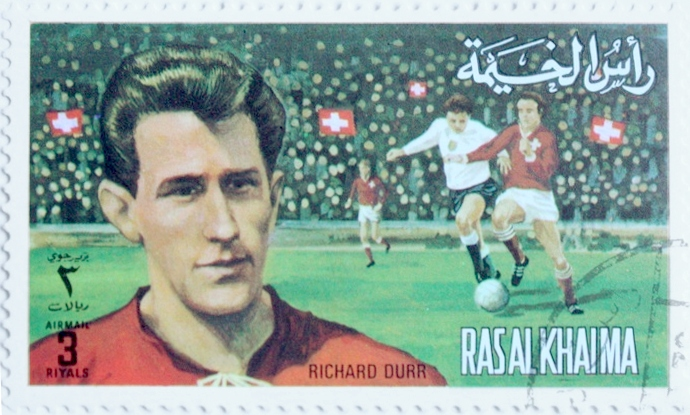

Personal information
- Full name: Richard Dürr
- Date of birth: 1 December 1938
- Place of birth: Switzerland
- Date of death: 30 May 2014 (aged 75)

Senior career*
Years	Team	Apps	(Gls)
1959–1961	Young Boys	34	(8)
1961–1971	Lausanne-Sport	237	(71)
Total		271	(79)

International career
1962–1968	Switzerland	29	(1)
- * Club domestic league appearances and goals

Richard Dürr (1 December 1938 – 30 May 2014) was a Swiss international footballer who played as a midfielder.

Durr played for Lausanne Sports during his club career, and scored a consolation goal for them in their 1st round 2nd leg game against Raba ETO Győr in the 1969–70 Inter-Cities Fairs Cup.

He earned 29 senior caps for the Switzerland national football team, and participated in the 1962 FIFA World Cup and the 1966 FIFA World Cup. The only goal he scored for them was against Cyprus on 8 November 1967.

He ran a football bar in Lausanne for almost 50 years. It is decorated with football memorabilia, and is especially popular with fans when Switzerland are playing in major tournaments.
