= 1960 Danish 1st Division =

15th season of Danish 1st Division

Danish 1st Division
- Season: 1960

The 1960 Danish 1st Division season was the 15th edition of Danish 1st Division annual football competition in Denmark. It was contested by 12 teams.

Boldklubben 1909 unsuccessfully defended its 1959 title. Aarhus Gymnastikforening successfully pursued its 1960 title.

Statistics of Danish 1st Division in the 1960 season.

== League standings ==
Pos	Team	Pld	W	D	L	GF	GA	GD	Pts
1	Aarhus Gymnastikforening	22	13	6	3	52	32	+20	32
2	Kjøbenhavns Boldklub	22	13	3	6	63	33	+30	29
3	Vejle Boldklub	22	12	5	5	52	35	+17	29
4	Odense Boldklub	22	10	6	6	47	39	+8	26
5	Frederikshavn fI	22	8	8	6	32	30	+2	24
6	Esbjerg fB	22	7	8	7	26	30	−4	22
7	Boldklubben 1913	22	8	3	11	41	40	+1	19
8	Boldklubben 1909	22	6	6	10	37	46	−9	18
9	Boldklubben 1903	22	6	6	10	21	29	−8	18
10	Skovshoved IF	22	5	8	9	25	39	−14	18
11	Akademisk Boldklub	22	6	5	11	32	46	−14	17
12	Boldklubben Frem	22	4	4	14	33	62	−29	12

== Results ==
Home \ Away	ABK	AGF	B03	B09	B13	EFB	FFI	BKF	KBK	OB	SKO	VBK
Akademisk BK	—	0–2	1–1	2–1	0–4	1–2	3–1	2–3	2–2	1–1	0–3	2–0
Aarhus GF	2–2	—	1–0	4–1	3–1	0–0	2–3	3–0	6–2	1–0	6–1	2–2
B 1903	1–0	1–2	—	1–1	0–4	1–1	1–1	3–0	0–0	0–2	0–3	3–1
B 1909	2–1	3–3	0–1	—	4–0	2–0	0–1	5–2	5–2	0–6	0–2	2–1
B 1913	1–3	1–0	1–1	1–1	—	3–0	1–2	1–4	2–1	3–0	5–0	3–4
Esbjerg fB	1–3	1–1	1–0	2–2	2–1	—	1–0	2–0	1–3	1–1	1–0	0–1
Frederikshavn fI	3–0	2–3	1–0	1–1	2–2	1–1	—	1–1	1–0	3–3	3–0	0–2
BK Frem	1–6	2–3	0–1	3–2	3–2	2–2	1–3	—	2–4	0–2	1–2	3–4
Kjøbenhavns BK	4–0	1–2	2–0	5–1	2–0	3–1	5–1	10–3	—	1–1	1–0	2–1
Odense BK	4–2	4–0	4–1	3–1	5–3	2–2	2–1	2–0	0–8	—	2–3	0–2
Skovshoved IF	1–1	1–1	0–4	0–0	0–1	1–3	0–0	1–1	2–4	2–2	—	1–1
Vejle BK	6–0	4–5	3–1	5–3	3–1	2–1	1–1	1–1	2–1	4–1	2–2	—

Legend: Blue = home team win; Yellow = draw; Red = away team win.
