= 2018 Slovakia v Denmark football match =

Slovakia v Denmark (2018)
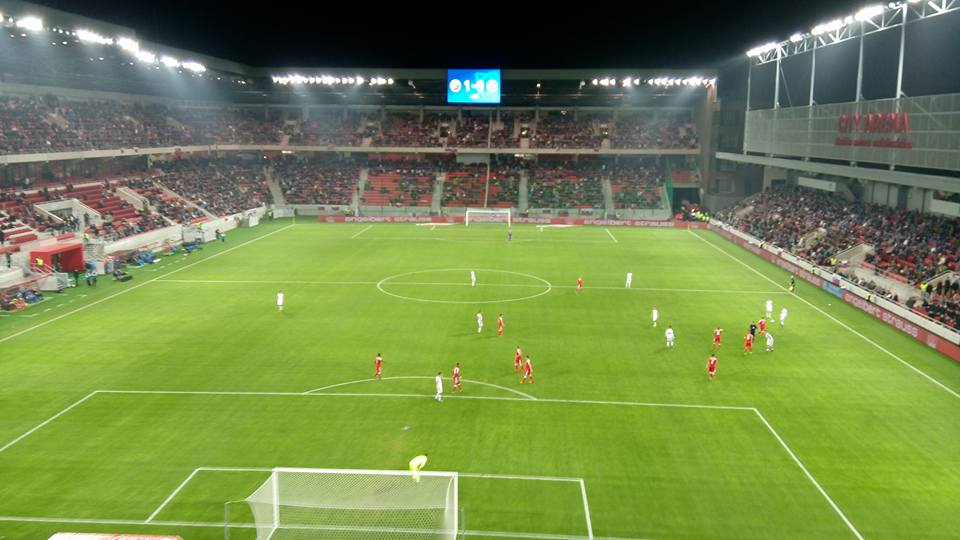
- The Anton Malatinský Stadium in Trnava hosted the match.
- Event: International friendly
Slovakia	Denmark
3	0
- Date: 5 September 2018
- Venue: Anton Malatinský Stadium, Trnava
- Referee: Julian Weinberger (Austria)
- Attendance: 6,432
- Weather: Clear night 23 °C (73 °F); 68% humidity

The 2018 Slovakia v Denmark football match was an international friendly association football match between the senior national teams of Slovakia and Denmark. The match took place on 5 September 2018 at the Anton Malatinský Stadium in Trnava, Slovakia. Due to a dispute with the Danish players' union regarding commercial rights, the Danish Football Union replaced the regular national squad, which had not lost a match in nearly two years, with an entirely uncapped squad consisting of semi-professional and amateur players from the third, fourth and fifth tiers of the Danish football league system, as well as futsal players. Despite the vast inexperience of the Danish players, and having only been called up 48 hours prior, the match only finished as a 3–0 win for Slovakia. The Danish team were praised for their performance in avoiding humiliation, especially futsal goalkeeper Christoffer Haagh, who made seven saves during the match.

== Background ==
The fixture was the first match for Denmark since the 2018 FIFA World Cup in Russia, where they were eliminated in the round of 16 by Croatia in a penalty shoot-out following a 1–1 draw after extra time. As the match is counted as a draw for statistical purposes, Denmark were undefeated in official matches since 11 October 2016, when they lost to Montenegro in World Cup qualifying. The Danish team were tied for 9th in the FIFA World Rankings prior to the match, while Slovakia were ranked 26th. The match was the third meeting between Slovakia and Denmark.

Following the World Cup, the national team agreement between the Danish players' union (Spillerforeningen) and the Danish Football Union (DBU) had expired on 31 July 2018, and a new one was undergoing negotiations since the start of the year. On 20 August 2018, Denmark national team manager Åge Hareide named a squad of 21 players for their friendly match against Slovakia and opening UEFA Nations League match against Wales, taking place on 5 and 9 September 2018 respectively. The squad, which later had two more players added on 28 August, largely featured regulars of the national team. However, negotiations between the players' union and the DBU for a new national team agreement had stalled, largely over issues related to the commercial image rights of the players. The dispute arose as Hummel had the exclusive right to the manufacture and marketing of Danish kits. The DBU wanted to use individual players, without explicit permissions, in their advertising. After failing to meet the last deadline of 31 August 2018, the negotiations were suspended at the start of September. The DBU offered to extend the previous agreement for the September 2018 matches, thus allowing for the negotiations to be completed after the international window. The DBU wanted to avoid fines and possible exclusion by UEFA for failing to play their two scheduled September 2018 matches. The DBU were under a four-year probationary period with UEFA for having forfeited a Women's World Cup qualifying match against Sweden in 2017 due to a similar dispute with the women's team, and a further violation could have resulted in Denmark being prohibited from participation in either the Nations League or the UEFA Euro 2020. After no extension agreement could be reached by the evening of 2 September, the Danish Football Union confirmed on 3 September that a new squad and manager would be announced for the upcoming national team matches.

It is a deeply regrettable situation we are in. Both for the team, fans and for everyone in Danish football. We had hoped that the players would show up when we offered them the same fees, bonuses, paid insurance and better conditions in terms of aircraft, food and treatment. Now we are working on getting the best possible players to play the two matches for Denmark. It is crucial for the future of Danish football. If the matches are not played, we risk huge fines and exclusions for both national teams – and Danish football will return to the Stone Age in many extents.

— Claus Bretton-Meyer, administrative director of the DBU

On 4 September, the DBU announced an entirely uncapped squad to play in the friendly against Slovakia in lieu of the regular side. The DBU had decided to wait in announcing the team until the plane had left Danish soil, and airport staff had blocked to the view of the plane using two fire engines to prevent photographs being taken by the press. The search for a replacement squad was complicated by the fact that many of the players in Denmark's first and second divisions were also members of the players' union. Several players from the first division had expressed interest in playing for the team, though all later withdrew their statement due to fears over the pressure of potential harassment they would be subjected to. The replacement team consisted of a mixture of futsal players from the Denmark national team, and semi-professional and amateur players from the third, fourth and fifth tiers of Danish football league system. The team was assembled only 48 hours prior to the match. It was feared that the same squad would be used for the competitive Nations League fixture against Wales four days later. National team coach Hareide would similarly not be involved, with the side instead falling under the temporary management of John Jensen, a member of Denmark's UEFA Euro 1992 winning squad, with Hasse Kuhn serving as the assistant manager. Jensen had not met any of the players prior to travelling for the away match. In a news conference, Jensen said, "I had to start from scratch and ask each player his name and which position he plays on the field."

Expectations for Denmark were low due to the team's inexperience and lack of preparation, and because of Slovakia's full-strength side. Due to the weakened Danish selection, the entrance fee for the match were reduced to €1, and those who bought tickets in advance received a refund. The Slovak Football Association urged UEFA to review the situation and take appropriate action. Slovakia manager Ján Kozák was frustrated by Denmark's team selection, and said they would not have scheduled the fixture had they known in advance.

We were looking forward to Denmark, the team has high quality, and our fans were looking forward... It is a team from the last 16 of the World Cup, it should be a challenge. The situation has changed, we do not know who will come... What is the point of sending this team to meet us? Does Denmark just want to avoid a fine? So that they don't have problems with UEFA? Is it possible for these players to return to the line-up to represent their country? It bothers me. From a sporting perspective, this match will not give us anything. We could have spent our time better if we had known this before. But we have to respect that they will start as the Danish national team.

— Ján Kozák, Slovakia national team manager

Slovakia captain Martin Škrtel was also disappointed in the opposition.

We don't need to talk about that, it doesn't matter what players come. We know why we came here. We need to prepare for the duel with Ukraine, the match against Denmark will be important for us. We will focus on ourselves. For the third-league Danish players, it will be a great experience to play against footballers such as Hamšík, Lobotka, Škriniar. It's hard to judge, we don't really know what's going on. It's good that the players stand up for themselves, but on the other hand it is to the detriment of our national team match. It could have been a good match for them, for us and for the audience, but unfortunately it will be different. Strange and sad.

— Martin Škrtel, Slovakia national team captain

== Squads ==
The age listed for each player is on 5 September 2018, the day of the match. The numbers of caps and goals listed for each player are those prior to the match.

=== Slovakia ===
Slovakia called up 24 players for the friendly match, as well as their opening UEFA Nations League match against Ukraine on 9 September 2018.

Slovakia squad

Manager: Ján Kozák

No.	Pos.	Player	Date of birth (age)	Caps	Goals	Club
1	GK	Matúš Kozáčik	27 December 1983 (aged 34)	27	0	(Football Association of the Czech Republic) Viktoria Plzeň
23	GK	Martin Dúbravka	15 January 1989 (aged 29)	11	0	(The Football Association) Newcastle United
12	GK	Michal Šulla	15 July 1991 (aged 27)	3	0	(Slovak Football Association) Slovan Bratislava
3	DF	Martin Škrtel (captain)	15 December 1984 (aged 33)	97	6	(Turkish Football Federation) Fenerbahçe
	DF	Peter Pekarík	30 October 1986 (aged 31)	82	2	(German Football Association) Hertha BSC
15	DF	Tomáš Hubočan	17 September 1985 (aged 32)	61	0	(French Football Federation) Marseille
5	DF	Norbert Gyömbér	3 July 1992 (aged 26)	20	0	(Italian Football Federation) Perugia
14	DF	Milan Škriniar	11 February 1995 (aged 23)	18	0	(Italian Football Federation) Internazionale
16	DF	Róbert Mazáň	9 February 1994 (aged 24)	5	0	(Royal Spanish Football Federation) Celta Vigo
4	DF	Ľubomír Šatka	2 December 1995 (aged 22)	3	0	(Slovak Football Association) Dunajská Streda
2	DF	Martin Valjent	11 December 1995 (aged 22)	1	0	(Royal Spanish Football Federation) Mallorca
17	MF	Marek Hamšík	27 July 1987 (aged 31)	105	21	(Italian Football Federation) Napoli
7	MF	Vladimír Weiss	30 November 1989 (aged 28)	64	7	(Qatar Football Association) Al-Gharafa
19	MF	Juraj Kucka	26 February 1987 (aged 31)	59	6	(Turkish Football Federation) Trabzonspor
20	MF	Róbert Mak	8 March 1991 (aged 27)	45	10	(Russian Football Union) Zenit Saint Petersburg
8	MF	Ondrej Duda	5 December 1994 (aged 23)	24	4	(German Football Association) Hertha BSC
13	MF	Patrik Hrošovský	22 April 1992 (aged 26)	20	0	(Football Association of the Czech Republic) Viktoria Plzeň
6	MF	Ján Greguš	29 January 1991 (aged 27)	17	2	(Danish Football Association) Copenhagen
18	MF	Erik Sabo	22 November 1991 (aged 26)	15	0	(Israel Football Association) Beitar Jerusalem
10	MF	Albert Rusnák	7 July 1994 (aged 24)	12	1	(United States Soccer Federation) Real Salt Lake
22	MF	Stanislav Lobotka	25 November 1994 (aged 23)	11	2	(Royal Spanish Football Federation) Celta Vigo
21	FW	Michal Ďuriš	1 June 1988 (aged 30)	39	5	(Cyprus Football Association) Anorthosis Famagusta
11	FW	Adam Nemec	2 September 1985 (aged 33)	37	12	(Cyprus Football Association) Paphos
9	FW	Erik Pačinda	9 May 1989 (aged 29)	3	1	(Slovak Football Association) Dunajská Streda

=== Denmark ===
==== Original ====
Denmark originally called up 23 players for the friendly match, as well as their opening UEFA Nations League match against Wales on 9 September 2018.

Denmark original squad

Manager: Åge Hareide

No.	Pos.	Player	Date of birth (age)	Caps	Goals	Club
1	GK	Kasper Schmeichel	5 November 1986 (aged 31)	39	0	(The Football Association) Leicester City
22	GK	Frederik Rønnow	4 August 1992 (aged 26)	6	0	(German Football Association) Eintracht Frankfurt
16	GK	Jonas Lössl	1 February 1989 (aged 29)	1	0	(The Football Association) Huddersfield Town
4	DF	Simon Kjær (captain)	26 March 1989 (aged 29)	82	3	(Royal Spanish Football Federation) Sevilla
6	DF	Andreas Christensen	10 April 1996 (aged 22)	20	1	(The Football Association) Chelsea
2	DF	Nicolai Boilesen	16 February 1992 (aged 26)	17	1	(Danish Football Association) Copenhagen
17	DF	Jens Stryger Larsen	21 February 1991 (aged 27)	16	1	(Italian Football Federation) Udinese
3	DF	Jannik Vestergaard	3 August 1992 (aged 26)	16	1	(The Football Association) Southampton
14	DF	Henrik Dalsgaard	27 July 1989 (aged 29)	15	0	(The Football Association) Brentford
13	DF	Mathias Jørgensen	23 April 1990 (aged 28)	15	1	(The Football Association) Huddersfield Town
5	DF	Jonas Knudsen	16 September 1992 (aged 25)	4	0	(The Football Association) Ipswich Town
10	MF	Christian Eriksen	14 February 1992 (aged 26)	82	23	(The Football Association) Tottenham Hotspur
19	MF	Lasse Schöne	27 May 1986 (aged 32)	39	3	(Royal Dutch Football Association) Ajax
8	MF	Thomas Delaney	3 September 1991 (aged 27)	31	4	(German Football Association) Borussia Dortmund
7	MF	Viktor Fischer	9 June 1994 (aged 24)	20	3	(Danish Football Association) Copenhagen
23	MF	Pione Sisto	4 February 1995 (aged 23)	18	1	(Royal Spanish Football Federation) Celta
12	MF	Mike Jensen	19 February 1988 (aged 30)	6	0	(Norwegian Football Federation) Rosenborg
18	MF	Lukas Lerager	12 July 1993 (aged 25)	5	0	(French Football Federation) Bordeaux
9	MF	Anders Christiansen	8 June 1990 (aged 28)	3	0	(Swedish Football Association) Malmö FF
15	MF	Christian Nørgaard	10 May 1994 (aged 24)	0	0	(Italian Football Federation) Fiorentina
20	FW	Yussuf Poulsen	15 June 1994 (aged 24)	31	5	(German Football Association) RB Leipzig
11	FW	Martin Braithwaite	5 June 1991 (aged 27)	24	1	(The Football Association) Middlesbrough
21	FW	Andreas Cornelius	16 March 1993 (aged 25)	21	4	(French Football Federation) Bordeaux

==== Replacement ====
Denmark called up 24 players for the friendly match, replacing the originally selected squad.

Manager: John Jensen

No.	Pos.	Player	Date of birth (age)	Caps	Goals	Club
1	GK	Christoffer Haagh	17 February 1987 (aged 31)	0	0	(Danish Football Association) Jægersborg Boldklub
16	GK	Morten Bank	19 November 1996 (aged 21)	0	0	(Danish Football Association) Boldklubben Avarta
22	GK	Victor Vobbe Larsen	7 June 1995 (aged 23)	0	0	(Danish Football Association) Tarup-Paarup IF
3	DF	Nicolai Johansen	24 February 1994 (aged 24)	0	0	(Danish Football Association) Vanløse IF
4	DF	Christian Bannis	4 January 1992 (aged 26)	0	0	(Danish Football Association) Tarup-Paarup IF
5	DF	Mads Bertelsen	18 December 1994 (aged 23)	0	0	(Danish Football Association) Tarup-Paarup IF
6	DF	Daniel Nielsen	1 May 1995 (aged 23)	0	0	(Danish Football Association) Vanløse IF
12	DF	Kasper Skræp	26 February 2000 (aged 18)	0	0	(Danish Football Association) Tarup-Paarup IF
20	DF	Christian Bommelund Christensen	3 September 1989 (aged 29)	0	0	(Danish Football Association) Jægersborg Boldklub
	DF	Victor Hansen	19 November 1997 (aged 20)	0	0	(Danish Football Association) Frederikssund IK
2	MF	Simon Vollesen	26 January 1998 (aged 20)	0	0	(Danish Football Association) IF Skjold Birkerød
7	MF	Kasper Kempel	16 April 1994 (aged 24)	0	0	(Danish Football Association) Skovshoved IF
8	MF	Rasmus Johansson	4 April 1995 (aged 23)	0	0	(Danish Football Association) Hellerup IK
9	MF	Oskar Høybye	29 November 1996 (aged 21)	0	0	(Danish Football Association) Vanløse IF
10	MF	Rasmus Gaudin	19 August 1995 (aged 23)	0	0	(Danish Football Association) Vanløse IF
13	MF	Adam Fogt	4 September 1993 (aged 25)	0	0	(Danish Football Association) Kastrup Boldklub
14	MF	Christopher Jakobsen	14 September 1994 (aged 23)	0	0	(Danish Football Association) Hillerød Fodbold
18	MF	Anders Hunsballe	12 September 1992 (aged 25)	0	0	(Danish Football Association) Greve Fodbold
19	MF	Kevin Jørgensen	20 February 1987 (aged 31)	0	0	(Danish Football Association) Jægersborg Boldklub
11	FW	Christian Offenberg (captain)	30 November 1987 (aged 30)	0	0	(Danish Football Association) Boldklubben Avarta
15	FW	Troels Cillius Nielsen	12 May 1997 (aged 21)	0	0	(Danish Football Association) IF Skjold Birkerød
17	FW	Anders Fønss	20 June 1988 (aged 30)	0	0	(Danish Football Association) Tarup-Paarup IF
21	FW	Louis Veis	16 July 1992 (aged 26)	0	0	(Danish Football Association) Jægersborg Boldklub
23	FW	Daniel Holm	7 March 1995 (aged 23)	0	0	(Danish Football Association) Skovshoved IF

All of the players on the team had jobs outside football, including the following:

- Christian Bannis: worker at insurance company
- Christian Bommelund Christensen: carpenter
- Adam Fogt: political science student
- Anders Fønss: warehouse worker and boat mechanic
- Christoffer Haagh: administrative worker and owner of a goalkeeping company
- Rasmus Johansson: internet freestyle footballer
- Kevin Jørgensen: prison guard
- Victor Vobbe Larsen: newspaper salesman
- Christian Offenberg: part-time salesman
- Kasper Skræp: secondary school student
- Simon Vollesen: student

== Match ==
Prior to the match, a moment of silence was held for the footballers Juraj Halenár and Vojtěch Varadín, both natives of Trnava, who had died in the months prior.

=== Summary ===
Adam Nemec opened the scoring for Slovakia in the 11th minute of the match with a header past goalkeeper Christoffer Haagh at the back post, following a chipped cross from Juraj Kucka on the right side. Denmark managed to create chances of their own, including two in the 25th minute after Kasper Kempel's cross was missed by Christian Offenberg and a shot from 11 metres (12 yd) out by Oskar Høybye went over the crossbar. Denmark held off the opposition attacks until the 37th minute, when Kucka registered his second assist of the match after laying a ball back to Albert Rusnák, who scored beneath the goalkeeper to put Slovakia up 2–0 at half-time. Denmark remained well-organised and compact, despite finishing with one shot on target and only 27% possession. The majority of the second period was played in Denmark's half, though the score remained unchanged until the 79th minute, when Danish substitute futsal player Adam Fogt scored an own goal past Haagh after failing to clear a low cross sent by Róbert Mak from the left and deflected by Michal Ďuriš. Haagh made seven saves in the match, helping prevent a worse defeat for Denmark.

=== Details ===
5 September 2018
20:45 CEST (UTC+2)

Slovakia	3–0	Denmark
Nemec 11'; Rusnák 37'; Fogt 79' (o.g.)	Report

Anton Malatinský Stadium, Trnava
Attendance: 6,432
Referee: Julian Weinberger (Austria)

Slovakia	Denmark

GK	1	Matúš Kozáčik
RB	15	Tomáš Hubočan
CB	3	Martin Škrtel (c)	(substituted off) 83'
CB	4	Ľubomír Šatka
LB	16	Róbert Mazáň
CM	19	Juraj Kucka	(substituted off) 61'
CM	17	Marek Hamšík	(substituted off) 61'
CM	13	Patrik Hrošovský
RF	10	Albert Rusnák	(substituted off) 46'
CF	11	Adam Nemec	(substituted off) 46'
LF	7	Vladimír Weiss	(substituted off) 67'
Substitutes:
GK	12	Michal Šulla
GK	23	Martin Dúbravka
DF	2	Martin Valjent
DF	5	Norbert Gyömbér	(substituted on) 83'
DF	14	Milan Škriniar
MF	6	Ján Greguš	(substituted on) 61'
MF	8	Ondrej Duda	(substituted on) 61'
MF	18	Erik Sabo
MF	20	Róbert Mak	(substituted on) 46'
MF	22	Stanislav Lobotka
FW	9	Erik Pačinda	(substituted on) 67'
FW	21	Michal Ďuriš	(substituted on) 46'
Manager:
Ján Kozák

GK	1	Christoffer Haagh
RB	2	Simon Vollesen	(substituted off) 77'
CB	3	Nicolai Johansen
CB	6	Daniel Nielsen
LB	5	Mads Bertelsen	(substituted off) 71'
CM	4	Christian Bannis	(substituted off) 46'
CM	8	Rasmus Johansson	(substituted off) 84'
RW	9	Oskar Høybye	(substituted off) 61'
AM	10	Rasmus Gaudin
LW	7	Kasper Kempel	(substituted off) 61'
CF	11	Christian Offenberg (c)
Substitutes:
GK	16	Morten Bank
GK	22	Victor Vobbe Larsen
DF	12	Kasper Skræp
DF	20	Christian Bommelund Christensen	(substituted on) 84'
MF	13	Adam Fogt	(substituted on) 61'
MF	14	Christopher Jakobsen	(substituted on) 77'
MF	18	Anders Hunsballe	(substituted on) 46'
MF	19	Kevin Jørgensen
FW	15	Troels Cillius Nielsen
FW	17	Anders Fønss	(substituted on) 71'
FW	21	Louis Veis
FW	23	Daniel Holm	(substituted on) 61'
Manager:
John Jensen

Assistant referees:
Andreas Heidenreich (Austria)
Maximilian Kolbitsch (Austria)
Fourth official:
Boris Marhefka (Slovakia)

Match rules

- 90 minutes.
- Maximum of twelve named substitutes.
- Maximum of six substitutions.

=== Statistics ===
Statistic	Slovakia	Denmark
Goals scored	3	0
Total shots	22	6
Shots on target	9	1
Saves	1	7
Ball possession	73%	27%
Corner kicks	9	1
Fouls committed	7	13
Offsides	3	0
Yellow cards	0	0
Red cards	0	0

== Aftermath ==
Following the match, the Danish team were praised for the result, especially goalkeeper Christoffer Haagh for his role in preventing Slovakia from scoring more. Reuters described the defeat as a "moral victory" for the Danish team and stated "31-year-old Haagh played the game of his life". In a press conference following the match, temporary Denmark coach John Jensen called the group of players "heroes".

We got 24 heroes who were called in about 48 hours ago. And [they] played in a very low division compared to Slovakia, who have got world-class players... I'm proud, I'm shocked. These players that were on the pitch, and also these players that didn't come on the pitch, the friendship and what they did was absolutely amazing and I will never forget this defeat. This is my best defeat in my career.

— John Jensen, Denmark national team caretaker manager

In interviews after the match, many Slovak players expressed their continued frustration for the friendly being inadequate preparation for their upcoming competitive fixtures.

The Danes have laughed at us and the whole of UEFA, such things should not happen, it is sad, but there was nothing we could do about it. This should not happen at such a level. We had a chance for more goals, even though they play in lower leagues, they know how to play football. If they close the space, unless you break them with quick goals, they resist the whole match.

— Adam Nemec

Maybe everyone thought, given the leagues in which they compete, that we should beat them 10–0. As a result, we managed it, we worked out the chances for more than three goals, it was not easy considering that they defended with ten players. The coach encouraged us not to underestimate anything and stressed to us that it was a preparation for the next match and so we approached it as such. I think that the match fulfilled its purpose, it is definitely better to play such a match rather than not play anything during the week. The opponent did not have the quality of the real team from Denmark, but we could not do anything about it and now we will concentrate on the match against Ukraine.

— Ján Greguš

It was such a strange match. We played against an opponent that we knew what they would be like. It was the hardest thing to do in your head. Luckily, we managed to score three goals, we won and the best part is that we already have this match behind us. I would not say that we were only disappointed, we were also angry. We were looking forward to a good opponent and we had to play against the rival we played. However, we must admit that we expected them to be worse than they were. On the other hand, everyone can defend nowadays. They were shut in and we had to push through them.

— Martin Škrtel

On 6 September 2018, the day after the match, the DBU announced that the replacement players would return to their clubs, and a temporary agreement until 30 September had been reached with the players' union, thus enabling the originally selected squad, featuring the regular national team players, to play in their first Nations League fixture. On 9 September, Denmark won 2–0 at home against Wales in Aarhus with a brace from Christian Eriksen. On the same day, Slovakia lost their opening Nations League match away to Ukraine following a late penalty scored by Andriy Yarmolenko. Slovakia manager Ján Kozák would later resign the following month after over five years as coach, and the team was to be relegated from their Nations League group, but was ultimately saved from relegation by the format change of the Nations League for the upcoming edition. Denmark would go on to finish undefeated in their Nations League group, and were promoted to League A.

On 29 September 2018, the DBU and the players' union reached a new collective agreement for the men's senior national team, lasting until 2024.
