= Tarup-Paarup IF =

Association football club in Odense, Denmark

Tarup-Paarup
- Full name: Tarup-Paarup Idrætsforening
- Short name: TPI
- Founded: 13 February 1962; 64 years ago
- Ground: home Tarup Park, Odense
- Chairman: Michael Max Hansen
- Head coach: Ole Stangerup
- League: Denmark Series
- 2025–26: Denmark Series Group 3, 5th of 10; Promotion group 2, 10th of 10
- Website: tpi.dk
Home colours

Tarup-Paarup Idrætsforening, commonly known as Tarup-Paarup IF or TPI, is an association football club based in Odense, Denmark, that competes in the Denmark Series, the fifth tier of the Danish football league system. Founded in 1962 after the football departments of Tarup Idrætsforening and Paarup Gymnastikforening merged, it is affiliated to the regional DBU Funen football association. The team plays its home matches at home Tarup Park.

== History ==
=== Early history ===
On 13 February 1962, members of association football departments of Tarup Idrætsforening and Paarup Gymnastikforening convened at founding general meeting, which was announced in the local newspaper Tarup Nyt. Representatives from the Danish Football Association (DBU) and from Fyns Boldspil-Union (FBU) were present at the meeting, which was held at Tarup School. 22 members showed up, and they voted yes to a merger. Ib Rasmussen was elected chairman at the first ordinary general meeting on 24 April 1963. The football department initially became a subdivision of the Tarup Idrætsforening until the clubs decided to merge altogether on 19 June 1964.

The first coach of the new association football club was brought in from the largest club in the city, Odense Boldklub (OB), and membership of the club quickly rose.

=== 2018 Slovakia v Denmark football match ===
Tarup-Paarup IF gained national notoriety in September 2018. The Danish Football Association (DBU) and players' union were scheduled to sign a new national team agreement for the players of the Denmark national team prior to a friendly against Slovakia and their opening UEFA Nations League match against Wales. However, a contract dispute arose regarding the commercial rights of the players, resulting in a failure to sign a new agreement. Despite an offer from the squad to extend the previous deal to allow for further negotiations, the DBU instead named an entirely uncapped squad under the temporary management of coach John "Faxe" Jensen to avoid punishment from UEFA for cancelling the matches. The squad consisted of a mixture of players from the Danish 2nd Division and the Denmark Series (the third and fourth tier of Danish football respectively), along with futsal players from the Denmark national futsal team. Five of these players – Victor Vobbe Larsen, Kasper Skræp, Mads Bertelsen, Christian Bannis and Anders Fønss – played for Tarup-Paarup IF, and club management had encouraged to players to represent the national team despite contract dispute. The selection of lower league players meant, that matches were postponed in their respective divisions. Vikarholdet ("the substitutes team") as the squad was lovingly called, only lost 0–3 to Slovakia.

== See also ==
- Tarup-Paarup IF players
