= Simon Vollesen =

Danish footballer

Personal information
- Full name: Simon Møller Vollesen
- Date of birth: 26 January 1998 (age 28)
- Place of birth: Denmark
- Position: Defender

Team information
- Current team: IF Skjold Birkerød

Youth career
- –2017: Lyngby BK

Senior career*
Years	Team	Apps	(Gls)
2017–2018	Lyngby BK	7	(0)
2018–	IF Skjold Birkerød		

International career^{‡}
2018	Denmark	1	(0)
- * Club domestic league appearances and goals as of 17:50, 5 September 2018 (UTC) ‡ National team caps and goals as of 17:50, 5 September 2018 (UTC)

Simon Møller Vollesen (born 26 January 1998) is a Danish footballer who plays as a defender for IF Skjold Birkerød.

In September 2018, he made his debut for the Denmark national team, as the regular squad withdrew following a players' union dispute. On his debut for Denmark, Vollesen was one of only three Danish players on the pitch with some experience in professional football: Vollesen has made 10 appearances in the Danish Superliga for the Copenhagen suburban team Lyngby BK.

== International career ==
In September 2018, the Danish Football Association and players' union were scheduled to sign a new national team agreement for the players of the Denmark national team prior to a friendly against Slovakia and their opening UEFA Nations League match against Wales. However, a contract dispute arose regarding the commercial rights of the players, resulting in a failure to sign a new agreement. Despite an offer from the squad to extend the previous deal to allow for further negotiations, the DBU instead named an entirely uncapped squad under the temporary management of coach John Jensen to avoid punishment from UEFA for cancelling the matches. The squad consisted of a mixture of players from the Danish 2nd Division and the Denmark Series (the third and fourth tier of Danish football respectively), along with futsal players from the Denmark national futsal team.

On 4 September 2018, Vollesen was one of 24 players to be named in the replacement squad. The following day, he made his international debut in the friendly match against Slovakia, starting the match before coming off in the 77th minute for Christopher Jakobsen. The match finished as a 0–3 away loss.

== Career statistics ==
=== International ===
As of 5 September 2018

Denmark
Year	Apps	Goals
2018	1	0
Total	1	0
