= Christian Bannis =

Danish footballer (born 1992)

Personal information
- Full name: Christian Bannis
- Date of birth: 4 January 1992 (age 34)
- Place of birth: Denmark
- Position: Midfielder

Senior career*
| Years | Team | Apps | (Gls) |
| 2012–2013 | FC Fyn | 2 | (0) |
| 2013 | Otterup B&IK | | |
| 2013–2014 | BK Marienlyst | 28 | (1) |
| 2014–2015 | FC Svendborg | | |
| 2015–2016 | Middelfart G&BK | | |
| 2016–2017 | FC Svendborg | 8 | (0) |
| 2017–2018 | BK Marienlyst | 37 | (0) |
| 2018–2024 | Tarup-Paarup IF | 28+ | (0) |

International career
| 2018 | Denmark | 1 | (0) |
- * Club domestic league appearances and goals

Christian Bannis (born 4 January 1992) is a Danish footballer who played as a midfielder. In September 2018, he made his debut for the Denmark national team, as the regular squad withdrew following a players' union dispute.

== International career ==
In September 2018, the Danish Football Association and players' union were scheduled to sign a new national team agreement for the players of the Denmark national team prior to a friendly against Slovakia and their opening UEFA Nations League match against Wales. However, a contract dispute arose regarding the commercial rights of the players, resulting in a failure to sign a new agreement. Despite an offer from the squad to extend the previous deal to allow for further negotiations, the DBU instead named an entirely uncapped squad under the temporary management of coach John Jensen to avoid punishment from UEFA for cancelling the matches. The squad consisted of a mixture of players from the Danish 2nd Division and the Denmark Series (the third and fourth tier of Danish football respectively), along with futsal players from the Denmark national futsal team.

On 4 September 2018, Bannis was one of 24 players to be named in the replacement squad. The following day, he made his international debut in the friendly match against Slovakia, starting the match before coming off at half-time for Anders Hunsballe. The match finished as a 0–3 away loss.

== Career statistics ==
=== International ===
As of 5 September 2018

Denmark
| Year | Apps | Goals |
|---|---|---|
| 2018 | 1 | 0 |
| Total | 1 | 0 |
