= Christian Offenberg =

Danish footballer (born 1987)

Personal information
- Full name: Christian Offenberg
- Date of birth: 30 November 1987 (age 38)
- Place of birth: Denmark
- Height: 1.80 m (5 ft 11 in)
- Position: Forward

Team information
- Current team: VB 1968
- Number: 11

Youth career
- –2005: Lyngby

Senior career*
Years	Team	Apps	(Gls)
2005–2008	Køge Boldklub		
2011–2015	SC Egedal		
2015	Avarta		
2016	HIK		
2016–2019	Avarta	79	(34)
2019–2023	Ishøj		
2023–	VB 1968		

International career^{‡}
2018	Denmark	1	(0)
- * Club domestic league appearances and goals as of 18:03, 30 December 2018 (UTC) ‡ National team caps and goals as of 18:03, 5 September 2018 (UTC)

Christian Offenberg (born 30 November 1987) is a Danish footballer who plays as a forward for VB 1968. In September 2018, he made his debut for the Denmark national team, as the regular squad withdrew following a players' union dispute.

== Club career ==
Offenberg retired at the end of the 2018–19 season. A week later he announced, that he would not retire fully, but would continue at a club in the lower leagues. The club was Ishøj IF in the Denmark Series.

== International career ==
In September 2018, the Danish Football Association and players' union were scheduled to sign a new national team agreement for the players of the Denmark national team prior to a friendly against Slovakia and their opening UEFA Nations League match against Wales. However, a contract dispute arose regarding the commercial rights of the players, resulting in a failure to sign a new agreement. Despite an offer from the squad to extend the previous deal to allow for further negotiations, the DBU instead named an entirely uncapped squad under the temporary management of coach John Jensen to avoid punishment from UEFA for cancelling the matches. The squad consisted of a mixture of players from the Danish 2nd Division and the Denmark Series (the third and fourth tier of Danish football respectively), along with futsal players from the Denmark national futsal team.

On 4 September 2018, Offenberg was one of 24 players to be named in the replacement squad. The following day, he made his international debut in the friendly match against Slovakia. He was the captain of the team and played the entire match, which finished as a 0–3 away loss.

== Career statistics ==
=== International ===
As of 5 September 2018

Denmark
Year	Apps	Goals
2018	1	0
Total	1	0
