= Fønss =

Fønss is a Danish surname. Notable people with the surname include:

- Aage Fønss (1887–1976), Danish operatic singer
- Anders Fønss (born 1988), Danish footballer
- Olaf Fønss (1882–1949), Danish actor, director, producer, and film censor, brother of Aage
