= Anders Hunsballe =

Danish football player (born 1992)

Personal information
- Full name: Anders Hunsballe
- Date of birth: 12 September 1992 (age 34)
- Place of birth: Denmark
- Height: 1.80 m (5 ft 11 in)
- Position: Midfielder

Team information
- Current team: Greve Fodbold

Senior career*
Years	Team	Apps	(Gls)
2011–2012	Vestsjælland		
2012–	Greve Fodbold		

International career^{‡}
2018	Denmark	1	(0)
- * Club domestic league appearances and goals as of 23:31, 23 March 2024 (UTC) ‡ National team caps and goals as of 19:49, 5 September 2018 (UTC)

Anders Hunsballe (born 12 September 1992) is a Danish footballer who plays as a midfielder for Greve Fodbold. In September 2018, he made his debut for the Denmark national team, as the regular squad withdrew following a players' union dispute.

== Club career ==
=== Vestsjælland ===
Anders Hunsballe made his debut for the now defunct Danish 1st Division club Vestsjælland in 2011; he left the club after one season.

=== Greve Foldbold ===
He then joined Greve Fodbold at the beginning of the 2012–13 season, and is still playing for the club in 2025.

Hunsballe was part of the squad that won promotion to the Danish 2nd Division (3rd tier) following the 2015–16 season, and he was also part of the squad that was relegated back to the Denmark Series (4th tier) after the 2017–18 season.

== International career ==
In September 2018, the Danish Football Association and players' union were scheduled to sign a new national team agreement for the players of the Denmark national team prior to a friendly against Slovakia and their opening UEFA Nations League match against Wales. However, a contract dispute arose regarding the commercial rights of the players, resulting in a failure to sign a new agreement. Despite an offer from the squad to extend the previous deal to allow for further negotiations, the DBU instead named an entirely uncapped squad under the temporary management of coach John Jensen to avoid punishment from UEFA for cancelling the matches. The squad consisted of a mixture of players from the Danish 2nd Division and the Denmark Series (the third and fourth tier of Danish football respectively), along with futsal players from the Denmark national futsal team.

On 4 September 2018, Hunsballe was one of 24 players to be named in the replacement squad. The following day, he made his international debut in the friendly match against Slovakia, coming on as a substitute at half-time for Christian Bannis. The match finished as a 0–3 away loss.

== Career statistics ==
=== International ===
As of 5 September 2018

Denmark
Year	Apps	Goals
2018	1	0
Total	1	0

== Honours ==
Greve Fodbold

- Denmark Series (4th tier)
  - Promoted (1): 2015–16
