= Oskar Høybye =

Danish footballer

Personal information
- Full name: Oskar Georg Høybye
- Date of birth: 29 November 1996 (age 29)
- Place of birth: Denmark
- Height: 1.79 m (5 ft 10 in)
- Position: Forward

Senior career*
Years	Team	Apps	(Gls)
2015–2016	Vanløse IF		
2016–2017	Brønshøj BK	6	(0)
2017–2020	Vanløse IF	47+	(12+)
2020	FC Roskilde	9	(1)
2020–2023	HIK	75	(19)
2023–2024	Frederiksberg Alliancen 2000	23	(3)

International career
2018	Denmark	1	(0)
- * Club domestic league appearances and goals

Oskar Georg Høybye (born 29 November 1996) is a Danish footballer who plays as a forward for Hellerup IK. In September 2018, he made his debut for the Denmark national team, as the regular squad withdrew following a players' union dispute. In the Danish media, he became known for his skills in Counter-Strike and his love for gardening in his spare time. He was also a part of the strong Johannesskolen team, who won the Danish championship for primary schools in 2011.

== International career ==
In September 2018, the Danish Football Association and players' union were scheduled to sign a new national team agreement for the players of the Denmark national team prior to a friendly against Slovakia and their opening UEFA Nations League match against Wales. However, a contract dispute arose regarding the commercial rights of the players, resulting in a failure to sign a new agreement. Despite an offer from the squad to extend the previous deal to allow for further negotiations, the DBU instead named an entirely uncapped squad under the temporary management of coach John Jensen to avoid punishment from UEFA for cancelling the matches. The squad consisted of a mixture of players from the Danish 2nd Division and the Denmark Series (the third and fourth tier of Danish football respectively), along with futsal players from the Denmark national futsal team.

On 4 September 2018, Høybye was one of 24 players to be named in the replacement squad. The following day, he made his international debut in the friendly match against Slovakia, starting the match before coming off in the 61st minute for Adam Fogt. The match finished as a 0–3 away loss.

== Career statistics ==
=== International ===
As of 5 September 2018

Denmark
Year	Apps	Goals
2018	1	0
Total	1	0
