= Daniel Holm =

Danish footballer and coach (born 1995)

Personal information
- Full name: Daniel Holm Sørensen
- Date of birth: 7 March 1995 (age 31)
- Place of birth: Denmark
- Height: 1.84 m (6 ft 0 in)
- Position: Forward

Team information
- Current team: Vigerslev BK

Youth career
- 2011–2014: Brøndby

Senior career*
Years	Team	Apps	(Gls)
2014–2015	Brøndby	0	(0)
2015–2016	Hvidovre		
2016–2018	Frem	52	(11)
2018–2019	Skovshoved	12	(0)
2019	Brøndby II	6	
2019–2020	Frem	4	(0)
2021–	Vigerslev BK		

International career
2011–2012	Denmark U16	2	(0)
2012–2013	Denmark U17	2	(0)
2013–2014	Denmark U18	4	(0)
2018	Denmark	1	(0)

Managerial career
- 2020: Frem (youth)
- * Club domestic league appearances and goals

Daniel Holm Sørensen (born 7 March 1995) is a Danish football coach and retired footballer who plays as a forward for Danish amateur club Vigerslev Boldklub.

In September 2018, he made his debut for the Denmark national team, as the regular squad withdrew following a players' union dispute.

== Club career ==
Holm left Skovshoved IF in March 2019 and returned to his former club Brøndby IF to play for the club's reserve team in the last six games. In the summer 2019, he left Brøndby again and returned to one of his other former clubs, Boldklubben Frem. On 18 January 2020 it was confirmed, that Holm had decided to take a break from football, after playing only six games in first half of the season due to an injury. However, he was offered to stay at the club in a different role, and he accepted to work as assistant manager for the club's U9 team and eventually later work with the elite youth teams at the club.

On 23 March 2021 Holm confirmed, that he had returned to the pitch and would play for Copenhagen Series club Vigerslev Boldklub.

== International career ==
In September 2018, the Danish Football Association and players' union were scheduled to sign a new national team agreement for the players of the Denmark national team prior to a friendly against Slovakia and their opening UEFA Nations League match against Wales. However, a contract dispute arose regarding the commercial rights of the players, resulting in a failure to sign a new agreement. Despite an offer from the squad to extend the previous deal to allow for further negotiations, the DBU instead named an entirely uncapped squad under the temporary management of coach John Jensen to avoid punishment from UEFA for cancelling the matches. The squad consisted of a mixture of players from the Danish 2nd Division and the Denmark Series (the third and fourth tier of Danish football respectively), along with futsal players from the Denmark national futsal team.

On 4 September 2018, Holm was one of 24 players to be named in the replacement squad. The following day, he made his international debut in the friendly match against Slovakia, coming on as a substitute in the 61st minute for Kasper Kempel. The match finished as a 0–3 away loss.

== Career statistics ==
=== International ===
As of 5 September 2018

Denmark
Year	Apps	Goals
2018	1	0
Total	1	0
