= Christian Bommelund Christensen =

Danish futsal player and footballer (born 1989)

Personal information
- Full name: Christian Bommelund Christensen
- Date of birth: 3 August 1989 (age 37)
- Place of birth: Denmark
- Positions: Midfielder; defender

Team information
- Current team: JB Futsal Gentofte (futsal)

Senior career*
Years	Team	Apps	(Gls)
- JB Futsal Gentofte (futsal)
2016–2020	Jægersborg		

International career^{‡}
2016–	Denmark (futsal)	3	(0)
2018	Denmark	1	(0)
- * Club domestic league appearances and goals as of 20:28, 5 September 2018 (UTC) ‡ National team caps and goals as of 20:28, 5 September 2018 (UTC)

Christian Bommelund Christensen (born 3 August 1989) is a Danish futsal player and footballer who plays as a midfielder for JB Futsal Gentofte, the futsal division of Jægersborg Boldklub. In September 2018, he made his debut for the Denmark national football team, as the regular squad withdrew following a players' union dispute.

== International football career ==
In September 2018, the Danish Football Association and players' union were scheduled to sign a new national team agreement for the players of the Denmark national team prior to a friendly against Slovakia and their opening UEFA Nations League match against Wales. However, a contract dispute arose regarding the commercial rights of the players, resulting in a failure to sign a new agreement. Despite an offer from the squad to extend the previous deal to allow for further negotiations, the DBU instead named an entirely uncapped squad under the temporary management of coach John Jensen to avoid punishment from UEFA for cancelling the matches. The squad consisted of a mixture of players from the Danish 2nd Division and the Denmark Series (the third and fourth tier of Danish football respectively), along with futsal players from the Denmark national futsal team.

On 4 September 2018, Bommelund Christensen was one of 24 players to be named in the replacement squad. The following day, he made his international debut in the friendly match against Slovakia, coming on as a substitute in the 84th minute for Rasmus Johansson. The match finished as a 0–3 away loss.

== Career statistics ==
=== International ===
As of 5 September 2018

Denmark
Year	Apps	Goals
2018	1	0
Total	1	0
