= Mads Bertelsen =

Danish footballer (born 1994)

Personal information
- Full name: Mads Priisholm Bertelsen
- Date of birth: 18 December 1994 (age 31)
- Place of birth: Denmark
- Position: Defender

Team information
- Current team: Tarup-Paarup IF

Senior career*
Years	Team	Apps	(Gls)
–2016	Næsby BK		
2016–2017	FC Broby		
2017	FC Svendborg	15	(0)
2017–	Tarup-Paarup IF	13	(0)

International career^{‡}
2018	Denmark	1	(0)
- * Club domestic league appearances and goals as of 17:58, 30 December 2018 (UTC) ‡ National team caps and goals as of 17:58, 5 September 2018 (UTC)

Mads Priisholm Bertelsen (born 18 December 1994) is a Danish footballer who plays as a defender for Tarup-Paarup IF. In September 2018, he made his debut for the Denmark national team, as the regular squad withdrew following a players' union dispute.

== International career ==
In September 2018, the Danish Football Association and players' union were scheduled to sign a new national team agreement for the players of the Denmark national team before a friendly against Slovakia and their opening UEFA Nations League match against Wales. However, a contract dispute arose regarding the commercial rights of the players, resulting in a failure to sign a new agreement. Despite an offer from the squad to extend the previous deal to allow for further negotiations, the DBU instead named an entirely uncapped squad under the temporary management of coach John Jensen to avoid punishment from UEFA for canceling the matches. The squad consisted of a mixture of players from the Danish 2nd Division and the Denmark Series (the third and fourth tier of Danish football respectively), along with futsal players from the Denmark national futsal team.

On 4 September 2018, Bertelsen was one of 24 players to be named in the replacement squad. The following day, he made his international debut in the friendly match against Slovakia, starting the match before coming off in the 71st minute for Anders Fønss. The match finished as a 0–3 away loss.

== Career statistics ==
=== International ===
As of 5 September 2018

Denmark
Year	Apps	Goals
2018	1	0
Total	1	0
