= Christoffer Haagh =

Danish footballer (born 1987)

Personal information
- Full name: Christoffer Haagh
- Date of birth: 17 February 1987 (age 39)
- Place of birth: Denmark
- Height: 1.84 m (6 ft 0 in)
- Position: Goalkeeper

Team information
- Current team: JB Futsal Gentofte (futsal)

Youth career
- 2003–2006: Aarhus GF
- 2006–2008: Nordsjælland

Senior career*
Years	Team	Apps	(Gls)
2006–2015	JB Futsal Gentofte (futsal)		
2007–2008	Nordsjælland	0	(0)
2008–2009	Frederikssund		
2015–2016	Xaloc Alacant (futsal)		
2016	Catanzaro C5 (futsal)		
2016–2024	JB Futsal Gentofte (futsal)		
2017–2020	Jægersborg		

International career
2012–2024	Denmark (futsal)	81	(4)
2018	Denmark	1	(0)

Managerial career
- 2024–: Hjørring (futsal)
- * Club domestic league appearances and goals

Christoffer Haagh (born 17 February 1987) is a Danish futsal manager, former futsal player and former footballer who played as a goalkeeper. He is the manager of futsal club Hjørring.

In September 2018, he made his debut for the Denmark national football team, as the regular squad withdrew following a players' union dispute.

== International football career ==
In September 2018, the Danish Football Association and players' union were scheduled to sign a new national team agreement for the players of the Denmark national team prior to a friendly against Slovakia and their opening UEFA Nations League match against Wales. However, a contract dispute arose regarding the commercial rights of the players, resulting in a failure to sign a new agreement. Despite an offer from the squad to extend the previous deal to allow for further negotiations, the DBU instead named an entirely uncapped squad under the temporary management of coach John Jensen to avoid punishment from UEFA for cancelling the matches. The squad consisted of a mixture of players from the Danish 2nd Division and the Denmark Series (the third and fourth tier of Danish football respectively), along with futsal players from the Denmark national futsal team.

On 4 September 2018, Haagh was one of 24 players to be named in the replacement squad. The following day, he made his international debut in the friendly match against Slovakia. He played the entire match, which finished as a 0–3 away loss. Despite the defeat, Haagh earned praise for his display in the game, making a number of saves to keep the score down.

== Career statistics ==
=== International ===
As of 5 September 2018

Denmark
Year	Apps	Goals
2018	1	0
Total	1	0
