= Adam Fogt =

Danish futsal player and footballer (born 1993)

Personal information
- Full name: Adam Fogt
- Date of birth: 9 April 1993 (age 33)
- Place of birth: Copenhagen, Denmark
- Position: Forward

Team information
- Current team: AB Tårnby

Senior career*
Years	Team	Apps	(Gls)
2015–2020	Kastrup Boldklub		
2020–2021	AB Tårnby		

International career^{‡}
2016–	Denmark (futsal)	11	(2)
2018	Denmark	1	(0)
- * Club domestic league appearances and goals as of 23:20, 22 March 2025 (UTC) ‡ National team caps and goals as of 20:06, 5 September 2018 (UTC)

Adam Fogt (born 9 April 1993) is a Danish futsal player and footballer who plays as a forward for AB Tårnby. In September 2018, he made his debut for the Denmark national football team, as the regular squad withdrew following a players' union dispute.

== International football career ==
In September 2018, the Danish Football Association and players' union were scheduled to sign a new national team agreement for the players of the Denmark national team prior to a friendly against Slovakia and their opening UEFA Nations League match against Wales. However, a contract dispute arose regarding the commercial rights of the players, resulting in a failure to sign a new agreement. Despite an offer from the squad to extend the previous deal to allow for further negotiations, the DBU instead named an entirely uncapped squad under the temporary management of coach John Jensen to avoid punishment from UEFA for cancelling the matches. The squad consisted of a mixture of players from the Danish 2nd Division and the Denmark Series (the third and fourth tier of Danish football respectively), along with futsal players from the Denmark national futsal team.

On 4 September 2018, Fogt was one of 24 players to be named in the replacement squad. The following day, he made his international debut in the friendly match against Slovakia, coming on as a substitute in the 61st minute for Oskar Høybye. The match finished as a 0–3 away loss, with Fogt scoring an own goal in the 79th minute for Slovakia's third.

== Career statistics ==
=== International ===
As of 5 September 2018

Denmark
Year	Apps	Goals
2018	1	0
Total	1	0
