= Kasper Kempel =

Danish footballer (born 1994)

Personal information
- Full name: Kasper Max Hedegaard Kempel
- Date of birth: 16 April 1994 (age 32)
- Place of birth: Kolind, Denmark
- Height: 1.77 m (5 ft 10 in)
- Position: Forward

Youth career
- 200?–2013: Aarhus GF

Senior career*
Years	Team	Apps	(Gls)
2013–2014	Aarhus Fremad		
2014–2015	Skive IK	1	(0)
2015–2017	VSK Aarhus	13	(4)
2017–2018	BK Frem	8	(0)
2018	Greve Fodbold	15	(10)
2018–2020	Skovshoved IF	28	(9)

International career^{‡}
2018	Denmark	1	(0)
- * Club domestic league appearances and goals as of 18:01, 30 December 2018 (UTC) ‡ National team caps and goals as of 18:01, 5 September 2018 (UTC)

Kasper Max Hedegaard Kempel (born 16 April 1994) is a Danish former footballer who played as a forward. In September 2018, he made his debut for the Denmark national team, as the regular squad withdrew following a players' union dispute.

== International career ==
In September 2018, the Danish Football Association and players' union were scheduled to sign a new national team agreement for the players of the Denmark national team prior to a friendly against Slovakia and their opening UEFA Nations League match against Wales. However, a contract dispute arose regarding the commercial rights of the players, resulting in a failure to sign a new agreement. Despite an offer from the squad to extend the previous deal to allow for further negotiations, the DBU instead named an entirely uncapped squad under the temporary management of coach John Jensen to avoid punishment from UEFA for cancelling the matches. The squad consisted of a mixture of players from the Danish 2nd Division and the Denmark Series (the third and fourth tier of Danish football respectively), along with futsal players from the Denmark national futsal team.

On 4 September 2018, Kempel was one of 24 players to be named in the replacement squad. The following day, he made his international debut in the friendly match against Slovakia, starting the match before coming off in the 61st minute for Daniel Holm. The match finished as a 0–3 away loss.

== Career statistics ==
=== International ===
As of 5 September 2018

Denmark
Year	Apps	Goals
2018	1	0
Total	1	0
