= Rasmus Gaudin =

Danish footballer

Personal information
- Full name: Rasmus Gaudin
- Date of birth: 19 August 1995 (age 31)
- Place of birth: Denmark
- Position: Midfielder

Senior career*
Years	Team	Apps	(Gls)
2015–2018	Virum-Sorgenfri BK		
2018–2023	Vanløse IF	25	(3)

International career
2018	Denmark	1	(0)
- * Club domestic league appearances and goals

Rasmus Gaudin (born 19 August 1995) is a Danish former footballer who played as a midfielder. In September 2018, he made his debut for the Denmark national team, as the regular squad withdrew following a players' union dispute.

== International career ==
In September 2018, the Danish Football Association and players' union were scheduled to sign a new national team agreement for the players of the Denmark national team prior to a friendly against Slovakia and their opening UEFA Nations League match against Wales. However, a contract dispute arose regarding the commercial rights of the players, resulting in a failure to sign a new agreement. Despite an offer from the squad to extend the previous deal to allow for further negotiations, the DBU instead named an entirely uncapped squad under the temporary management of coach John Jensen to avoid punishment from UEFA for cancelling the matches. The squad consisted of a mixture of players from the Danish 2nd Division and the Denmark Series (the third and fourth tier of Danish football respectively), along with futsal players from the Denmark national futsal team.

On 4 September 2018, Gaudin was one of 24 players to be named in the replacement squad. The following day, he made his international debut in the friendly match against Slovakia. He played the entire match, which finished as a 0–3 away loss.

== Career statistics ==
=== International ===
As of 5 September 2018

Denmark
Year	Apps	Goals
2018	1	0
Total	1	0
