= Anders Fønss =

Danish footballer (born 1988)

Personal information
- Full name: Anders Fønss
- Date of birth: 20 June 1988 (age 38)
- Place of birth: Fjordager, Denmark
- Height: 1.85 m (6 ft 1 in)
- Position: Forward

Youth career
- Fjordager IF

Senior career*
Years	Team	Apps	(Gls)
2005–2006	Fjordager IF		
2006–2007	Næsby		
2007	SønderjyskE		
2007–2009	FC Fyn		
2010–2011	Næsby		
2011–2012	B 1909		
2012	Otterup B&IK		
2012–2017	Tarup-Paarup		
2017	Strib IF		
2018	Tarup-Paarup	13	(3)
2019	Marienlyst	9	(2)
2020	Tarup-Paarup		
2020–2025	Agedrup Bullerup BK		

International career
2018	Denmark	1	(0)

Managerial career
- 2017: Strib IF (player-manager)
- * Club domestic league appearances and goals as of 15:27, 9 May 2020 (UTC)

Anders Fønss (born 20 June 1988) is a Danish former footballer who played as a forward. In September 2018, he made his debut for the Denmark national team, as the regular squad withdrew following a players' union dispute.

== International career ==
In September 2018, the Danish Football Association and players' union were scheduled to sign a new national team agreement for the players of the Denmark national team prior to a friendly against Slovakia and their opening UEFA Nations League match against Wales. However, a contract dispute arose regarding the commercial rights of the players, resulting in a failure to sign a new agreement. Despite an offer from the squad to extend the previous deal to allow for further negotiations, the DBU instead named an entirely uncapped squad under the temporary management of coach John Jensen to avoid punishment from UEFA for cancelling the matches. The squad consisted of a mixture of players from the Danish 2nd Division and the Denmark Series (the third and fourth tier of Danish football respectively), along with futsal players from the Denmark national futsal team.

On 4 September 2018, Fønss was one of 24 players to be named in the replacement squad. The following day, he made his international debut in the friendly match against Slovakia, coming on as a substitute in the 71st minute for Mads Bertelsen. The match finished as a 0–3 away loss.

In the summer 2017, after three years at Tarup-Paarup IF, Fønss moved to Stribe IF as a player-head coach. However, he decided to resign on 1 November 2017. Following the national team appearance, in December 2018 it was announced that Fønss would sign for BK Marienlyst at the start of the winter transfer window. In March 2020, he returned to Tarup-Paarup IF. He then moved to Agedrup Bullerup Boldklub in September 2020.

== Career statistics ==
=== International ===
As of 5 September 2018

Denmark
Year	Apps	Goals
2018	1	0
Total	1	0
