= Michael Sahl Hansen =

Danish handball player (born 1978)

Personal information
- Full name: Michael Sahl Hansen
- Nationality: Danish (Denmark)
- Born: 10 March 1978 (age 48)
- Height: 195 cm (77 in)

Sport
- Sport: Handball
- Position: Playmaker / Line player

Senior clubs
- Years: Team
- –: Frederiksberg IF
- –: FCK Håndbold
- –: AG København

Michael Sahl Hansen (born 10 March 1978) is a Danish former handball player, who played for Danish Handball League side FCK Håndbold. He was the team's captain, and in 2008, he led his team to their first ever Danish championship.

After his playing career, he has been involved in Spillerforeningen, the Danish labour union for handball players, where he has been the chairperson since 2020.
