= John Jensen =

Danish footballer (born 1965)

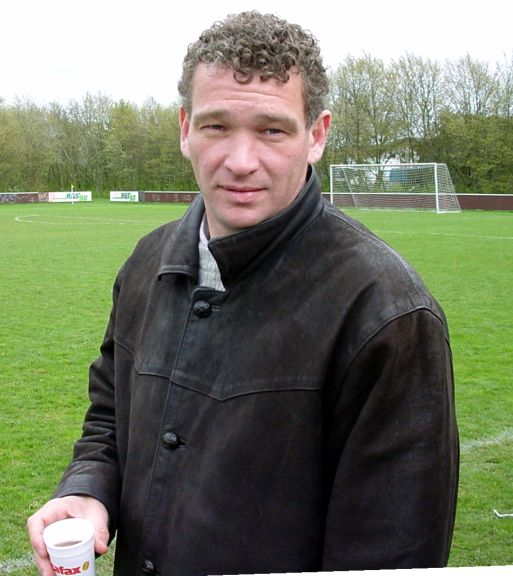
- Jensen in 2002

Personal information
- Date of birth: 3 May 1965 (age 61)
- Place of birth: Copenhagen, Denmark
- Height: 1.78 m (5 ft 10 in)
- Position: Central midfielder

Youth career
- Brøndby

Senior career*
Years	Team	Apps	(Gls)
1983–1988	Brøndby	158	(15)
1988–1990	Hamburger SV	47	(0)
1990–1992	Brøndby	61	(5)
1992–1996	Arsenal	98	(1)
1996–1999	Brøndby	90	(3)
1999–2001	Herfølge	40	(0)
Total		494	(24)

International career
1984	Denmark U21	3	(0)
1987–1995	Denmark	69	(4)

Managerial career
- 1999–2002: Herfølge
- 2009: Randers
- 2014–2018: Fremad Amager
- 2018: Denmark (caretaker)
Medal record
Men's football
Representing Denmark
UEFA European Championship
Winner	1992 Sweden
- * Club domestic league appearances and goals

John Jensen (Danish pronunciation: [ˈjʌn ˈjensn̩]; born 3 May 1965), nicknamed Faxe (pronounced [ˈfɑksə]), is a Danish professional football manager and former player.

A former midfielder, his playing career lasted almost two entire decades, including a stint with Arsenal in England and three stints with Brøndby in Denmark. He scored four goals in 69 caps for the Denmark national team, entering Danish footballing folklore during the 1992 European Championship tournament, when he scored the opening goal in Denmark's 2–0 victory over Germany in the final.

== Club career ==
=== Early career ===
Jensen started his career at Brøndby IF, and was an important part of the team that won the Danish championship in 1987, crowned by a call-up to the Denmark national team and the Danish Player of the Year award in 1987. After impressing in the UEFA Euro 1988, he spent a brief, unhappy spell in the Bundesliga team Hamburger SV, and was back with Brøndby in March 1990, where he took part in the club's successful 1991 UEFA Cup campaign, which reached the semi-final of the tournament.

=== Arsenal ===
In July 1992, Jensen was signed by George Graham for Arsenal in a £1.1 million deal to succeed Leeds United-bound David Rocastle in central midfield, after a bid to sign Geoff Thomas from Crystal Palace failed.

In his first season at Highbury, after making his Arsenal League debut on the opening day of the season versus Norwich City, he struggled at first to make any sort of impact within the English game and, although a great tackler and a work rate second to none, he found the pace of the Premier League too frenzied. He missed the 1993 Football League Cup final versus Sheffield Wednesday but bounced back to put in two sterling performances in the FA Cup final against the same opposition two months later.

In 1993-94, he was of paramount importance to the side. His bustling, combative style was a vital influence in Arsenal's midfield, until a knee ligament injury he received in an international friendly match with Denmark versus Hungary, which resulted in him missing the 1994 European Cup Winners' Cup final, after playing in all previous ties. Along with Ian Wright he was later granted a medal.

In 1994-95, although playing in 24 League games he had to endure the pain of missing yet another European Cup Winners Cup final when not selected by caretaker Stewart Houston.

Jensen also scored his first and only goal for Arsenal on his 98th appearance, against Queens Park Rangers on 31 December 1994. Officially, though, he also scored a shootout goal against his friend Peter Schmeichel of Manchester United in the 1993 FA Charity Shield.

On 21 February 1995 George Graham, who had led Arsenal to six trophies in eight seasons, lost his job after a Premier League inquiry found he had accepted an illegal £425,000 payment from Norwegian agent Rune Hauge following Arsenal's recruiting of Pål Lydersen and Jensen, two of Hauge's clients.

14 February 1996 Jensen played his last game for Arsenal in the League Cup semi-final versus Aston Villa, and left Highbury in March 1996, after 138 competitive appearances for the club.

=== Return to Denmark ===
After leaving Arsenal he rejoined his old club, Brøndby IF. In 1999, he moved on to Herfølge, where he was part of the squad that won the 1999–2000 Danish Superliga.

== International career ==
Jensen scored four goals in 69 appearances for the Denmark national team between 1987 and 1995. When he appeared at Euro 1992, he scored the first goal in the Final of an eventual 2–0 victory against Germany.

During the years he spent at Arsenal, Jensen scored two goals in 21 games for the Denmark national team: one against Albania in 1993 and one against Belgium in 1994.

== Coaching career ==
Jensen retired from full-time playing in 1999 and accepted the job of player/manager at Herfølge BK, a small Danish club, and immediately made a name for himself by winning the Danish Superliga on his first attempt. However, Herfølge's success was short-lived, and they were relegated from the Superliga in the 2001 season. Jensen's reputation with his old club was good enough to secure him a move back to Brøndby IF, as assistant manager to Michael Laudrup, a position he held until June 2006, when Jensen and Laudrup did not extend their contracts with the club.

When Laudrup 2007 was named new manager at Spanish side Getafe, Jensen followed him as assistant manager. Laudrup quit Getafe after only one season, taking Jensen with him. On 12 January 2009, Jensen started as manager of Danish Superliga side Randers FC. On 6 October 2009, Jensen was sacked from Randers FC after a series of nine losses and two draws in 11 matches.

On 12 January 2011, he signed a six-month contract with Blackburn Rovers to become assistant manager and work alongside Steve Kean. On 23 May 2011, he signed a new deal one-year deal to remain as Steve Kean's assistant at Blackburn.

On 29 September 2011, he left Blackburn Rovers.

On 11 October 2012, he was appointed consultant for Brøndby IF by manager Auri Skarbalius.

On 27 May 2014, he was named new manager of Danish club Fremad Amager replacing Tim Ilsø.

In September 2018, it was announced that Jensen would take temporary charge of the Denmark national team for their replacement team's friendly match against Slovakia, following a dispute between the Danish Football Union and players, which also involved incumbent head coach Åge Hareide. "When I say yes to help, it's because I feel very strongly for the national team as an institution, and because the most important thing must be that the games will be played after all", said Jensen.

== Career statistics ==
=== Club ===
Appearances and goals by club, season and competition
Club	Season	League			National Cup		League Cup		Europe		Total	
Club	Season	Division	Apps	Goals	Apps	Goals	Apps	Goals	Apps	Goals	Apps	Goals
Brøndby	1986	Danish 1st Division					–		6 (Note: Appearances in European Cup/UEFA Champions League)	1	6	1
Brøndby	1987	Danish 1st Division					–		3 (Note: Appearances in UEFA Cup)	0	3	0
Brøndby	1988	Danish 1st Division					–					
Brøndby	Total						–		9	1	9	1
Hamburger SV	1988–89	Bundesliga	32	0	4	1	–		–		36	1
Hamburger SV	1989–90	Bundesliga	15	0	0	0	–		6	1	21	1
Hamburger SV	Total		47	0	4	1	–		6	1	57	2
Brøndby	1990	Danish 1st Division	17	2			–		–		17	2
Brøndby	1991	Danish Superliga	17	1			–		9	0	26	1
Brøndby	1991–92	Danish Superliga	27	2			–		4	0	31	2
Brøndby	Total		61	5			–		13	0	74	5
Arsenal	1992–93	Premier League	32	0	4	0	3	0	–		39	0
Arsenal	1993–94	Premier League	27	0	1	0	5	0	8 (Note: Appearances in European Cup Winners' Cup)	0	41	0
Arsenal	1994–95	Premier League	24	1	2	0	2	0	5	0	33	1
Arsenal	1995–96	Premier League	15	0	2	0	2	0	–		19	0
Arsenal	Total		98	1	9	0	12	0	13	0	132	1
Brøndby	1995–96	Danish Superliga	10	1			–		–		10	1
Brøndby	1996–97	Danish Superliga	20	0			–		6	0	26	0
Brøndby	1997–98	Danish Superliga	31	1			–		4 (Note: Two appearances in UEFA Champions League, two appearances in UEFA Cup)	0	35	1
Brøndby	1998–99	Danish Superliga	29	1			–		7	0	36	1
Brøndby	Total		90	3			–		17	0	107	3
Herfølge	1999–2000	Danish Superliga	16	0			–		–		16	0
Herfølge	2000–01	Danish Superliga	24	0			–		2	1	26	1
Herfølge	Total		40	0			–		2	1	42	1
Career total			337	9	13	1	12	0	60	3	422	13

=== International ===
Scores and results list Denmark's goal tally first, score column indicates score after each Jensen goal.

List of international goals scored by John Jensen
No.	Date	Venue	Opponent	Score	Result	Competition
1	26 June 1992	Ullevi, Gothenburg, Sweden	Germany	1–0	2–0	UEFA Euro 1992
2	2 June 1993	Parken Stadium, Copenhagen, Denmark	Albania	1–0	4–0	1994 FIFA World Cup qualification
3	12 October 1994	Parken Stadium, Copenhagen, Denmark	Belgium	2–1	3–1	UEFA Euro 1996 qualification

== Honours ==
=== Player ===
Brøndby

- Danish Superliga: 1987, 1988, 1990, 1991, 1995–96, 1996–97, 1997–98

Arsenal

- FA Cup: 1992–93
- Football League Cup: 1992–93
- European Cup Winners' Cup: 1993–94; runner-up: 1994–95

Herfølge BK

- Danish Superliga: 1999–2000

Denmark

- European Championship: 1992

Individual

- Ballon d’Or nominee: 1992
- Danish Player of the Year: 1987

=== Manager ===
Herfølge BK

- Danish Superliga: 1999–2000

Individual

- Danish Coach of the Year: 2000
