= Spillerforeningen =

Danish Football Players Association

- Spillerforeningen
- The logo in use since November 2022
- Abbreviation: SPFO (Note: The abbreviation used the association was previously SPF, but they started using SPFO when implementing their new visual identify in November 2022.), SPF
- Founded: 19 May 1977; 48 years ago
- Headquarters: Frederiksholms Kanal, Copenhagen, Denmark
- Location: Denmark
- Members: 1,580 (2022)
- Key people: Michael Sahl Hansen (executive director); Jeppe Lund Curth (chairman)
- Affiliations: FIFPRO (international); FH (national); DEF (national)
- Website: spillerforeningen.dk

Spillerforeningen (SPFO, the Society of Professional Footballers or the Danish Football Players Association) is the Danish interest organisation and trade union for elite-level association football players, with members ranging from footballers in the four nationwide men's leagues of the Danmarksturneringen i fodbold (DM), the women's top flight league, Danish professionals playing abroad and retired footballers. It was founded in 1977, and has approximately 1,500 members (2022), of which a percentage are full-time professional football players in either Denmark or abroad. The association maintain, safeguard and advance the sporting and financial interests of the elite footballers towards Divisionsforeningen (DF) and the Danish Football Association (DBU). Jeppe Lund Curth is the current chairman of the organisation, elected in June 2016, while Michael Sahl Hansen is the CEO.

The association has been a part of the international players' union FIFPRO since 1993. On 18 June 2004, the association became a member of Danish Confederation of Trade Unions (LO), which on 1 January 2019 was replaced by the Danish Trade Union Confederation (FH). SPFO is also a member of Danske Elitesportsudøveres Forening (DEF). The annual Danish Football Player of the Year Award for both men and women is awarded in a collaboration between the Danish Football Association (DBU) and Spillerforeningen.

== History ==
=== Foundation and early years ===
The footballers' association was established on 19 May 1977 at the initiative of Torsten Andersen, who was also elected its first chairman. Another of the association's founders were Jørgen Lorentzen. The year prior to the introduction of professional contracts in Denmark, the captains of the league clubs held a meeting on 1 May 1977 at KB's facilities in Frederiksberg with the intention of forming a players' association. The association faced renewed dissolution threats in its first couple of years. A heated debate on the association's fate before and during the 1980 general meeting took place due to a split among the board members. While footballer Henning Munk Jensen suggested the association lacked support from both players and clubs, two other board members, Jørgen Lorentzen and Klaus Goeg, advocated for the association's continuation due to a notably positive sentiment towards it with more than 30 clubs having paid for their players' membership in the association in 1979. In the first couple of years following the foundation, the main agenda item at general meetings were whether the chairmain should receive a telephone subsidy of DKK 3-400.

The Players' Association got its chairman represented in the Danish Football Association's contract player committee. Initially, the association did not receive any funds from the Tipstjenesten, and the economy of the association did not warrant maintaining a small secretariat. In the early years, the association partook in debates regarding the structure of the Danish Football Association (DBU), the introduction of a Super League, issues surrounding the league national team, etc. After five years, the union would go on to focus more on addressing each player's individual problems in relation to their club or the Danish FA, moving towards a more of a trade union character, similar to the Players' Association in Spain.

Initially, each league club was a member of the players' association, making the players on the club's roster a member indirectly, which meant that the union could not keep track of each player. At the general assembly meeting held in Vejle on 25 January 1982, it was decided to transition to an individual player membership structure instead of each league club being a member of the players' association, beginning from 1983. The goal was to include all league club players, including those from non-professional clubs. Each club had paid the DKK 700 (as of 1982) membership fee to the players' association, but from 1983, each player would pay an expected DKK 50 membership fee individually. Additionally, a nine-point manifesto was created on 3 February 1982 at an inaugural board meeting addressing how the union could assist each member; from assisting with missing feriepenge payments, insurance guidance, and unemployment benefit problems.

A dispute with Divisionsforeningen regarding the introduction of the new Carlsberg Cup tournament in the summer of 1983 was resolved after a compromise was reached at a meeting in Copenhagen on 13 October 1982. The ambition level was lowered and instead the tournament became a preseason training tournament for the autumn season, and winning the tournament would not grant access to a spot in the UEFA Cup tournament. This allowed the players to have the three-week summer break they would have otherwise missed if the tournament had proceeded in its original format. The intervention marked the first time that the Players' Association had achieved results.

=== Bosman ruling ===
Spillerforeningen's new magazine, named Indersiden, was introduced in 1989. In 1988, the association's annual revenue was 61,000 kroner, which changed to over 1 million kroner in 1996. In February 1996, approximately 600 footballers (80 percent) from all league clubs were members, paying between 300 and 800 kroner in membership fees annually. In the top flight league, close to 100 percent were organized in Spillerforeningen. With the help of Sparekassen Bikuben, a secretariat located in Pilestræde in Copenhagen was established.

The association offered active support to the Belgian footballer Jean-Marc Bosman, who had filed a lawsuit that led to the Bosman ruling by the Court of Justice of the European Union in 1995.

Initially only meant to have male players as members, in 2001, the membership was extended to female players in the top flight league and professionals playing abroad. In 2022, the number of female members were approximately one hundred.

== Chairmen ==
All past chairmen of the Spillerforeningen are listed below. Mads Øland was appointed to the newly created position as executive director in 1997 and served until 2020, hereafter he was replaced by Michael Sahl Hansen.

- 1977–1980: Torsten Andersen
- 1980–1981: Klaus Goeg
- 1981–1984: Alex Nielsen
- 1984: Peter Bonde
- 1984–1986: Per Lundbak
- 1986–1988: Lars B. Christensen
- 1988–1989: Bent Wachmann
- 1990: Per Frimann
- 1990–1997: Mads Øland
- 1997–2000: Mogens Krogh
- 2000–2002: Søren Colding
- 2002–2005: Palle Sørensen (footballer)
- 2005–2006: Peter Møller
- 2006–2016: Thomas Lindrup
- 2016–present: Jeppe Lund Curth
