= UEFA Euro 1984 Group 1 =

Football tournament group stage

Group 1 of UEFA Euro 1984 was one of only two groups in the final tournament's initial group stage. It began on 12 June and was completed on 19 June. The group consisted of hosts France, Belgium, Denmark, and Yugoslavia.

France won the group and advanced to the semi-finals along with Denmark. Belgium and Yugoslavia were eliminated.

== Teams ==
Team	Method of qualification	Date of qualification	Finals appearance	Last appearance	Previous best performance
Belgium	Group 1 winner	12 October 1983	3rd	1980	Runners-up (1980)
Denmark	Group 3 winner	16 November 1983	2nd	1964	Fourth place (1964)
France	Host	10 December 1981	2nd	1960	Fourth place (1960)
Yugoslavia	Group 4 winner	21 December 1983	4th	1976	Runners-up (1960, 1968)

== Standings ==
Pos	Team	Pld	W	D	L	GF	GA	GD	Pts	Qualification
1	France (H)	3	3	0	0	9	2	+7	6	Advance to knockout stage
2	Denmark	3	2	0	1	8	3	+5	4	Advance to knockout stage
3	Belgium	3	1	0	2	4	8	−4	2	
4	Yugoslavia	3	0	0	3	2	10	−8	0	

Source: UEFA
Rules for classification: Group stage tiebreakers
(H) Hosts

In the semi-finals,

- The winner of Group 1, France, advanced to play the runner-up of Group 2, Portugal.
- The runner-up of Group 1, Denmark, advanced to play the winner of Group 2, Spain.

== Matches ==
=== France vs Denmark ===
12 June 1984
20:30

France	1–0	Denmark
Platini 78'	Report

Parc des Princes, Paris
Attendance: 47,570
Referee: Volker Roth (West Germany)

France	Denmark

GK	1	Joël Bats
SW	4	Maxime Bossis
CB	5	Patrick Battiston
CB	15	Yvon Le Roux		(substituted off) 60'
CB	2	Manuel Amoros	(red card) 87'
RM	14	Jean Tigana
CM	6	Luis Fernández
CM	10	Michel Platini (c)
LM	12	Alain Giresse
CF	17	Bernard Lacombe
CF	11	Bruno Bellone
Substitutions:
DF	3	Jean-François Domergue		(substituted on) 60'
Manager:
Michel Hidalgo

GK	20	Ole Qvist
SW	4	Morten Olsen (c)
CB	3	Søren Busk
CB	5	Ivan Nielsen
RM	15	Frank Arnesen		(substituted off) 79'
CM	7	Jens Jørn Bertelsen
CM	11	Klaus Berggreen
CM	9	Allan Simonsen		(substituted off) 46'
LM	6	Søren Lerby
CF	14	Michael Laudrup
CF	10	Preben Elkjær
Substitutions:
MF	13	John Lauridsen		(substituted on) 46'
MF	8	Jesper Olsen	(yellow card) 87'	(substituted on) 79'
Manager:
(West Germany) Sepp Piontek

=== Belgium vs Yugoslavia ===
13 June 1984
20:30

Belgium	2–0	Yugoslavia
Vandenbergh 28'; Grün 45'	Report

Stade Félix-Bollaert, Lens
Attendance: 41,525
Referee: Erik Fredriksson (Sweden)

Belgium	Yugoslavia

GK	1	Jean-Marie Pfaff
SW	4	Leo Clijsters	(substituted off) 34'
CB	14	Walter De Greef
RB	2	Georges Grün
LB	5	Michel De Wolf
DM	7	René Vandereycken
RM	16	Enzo Scifo
LM	6	Franky Vercauteren
CM	11	Jan Ceulemans (c)
CF	9	Erwin Vandenbergh
CF	8	Nico Claesen
Substitutions:
DF	3	Paul Lambrichts	(substituted on) 34'
Manager:
Guy Thys

GK	1	Zoran Simović
SW	5	Velimir Zajec (c)
CB	2	Nenad Stojković
CB	13	Faruk Hadžibegić	(yellow card) 53'
DM	4	Srečko Katanec
CM	10	Mehmed Baždarević		(substituted off) 59'
LM	7	Miloš Šestić
RM	8	Ivan Gudelj
RW	19	Sulejman Halilović
CF	9	Safet Sušić
LW	11	Zlatko Vujović		(substituted off) 76'
Substitutions:
MF	16	Dragan Stojković		(substituted on) 59'
FW	20	Borislav Cvetković		(substituted on) 76'
Manager:
Todor Veselinović

=== France vs Belgium ===
16 June 1984
17:15

France	5–0	Belgium
Platini 4', 74' (pen.), 89'; Giresse 33'; Fernández 43'	Report

Stade de la Beaujoire, Nantes
Attendance: 51,359
Referee: Bob Valentine (Scotland)

France	Belgium

GK	1	Joël Bats
SW	4	Maxime Bossis
CB	5	Patrick Battiston
CB	3	Jean-François Domergue
RM	6	Luis Fernández
CM	14	Jean Tigana	(yellow card) 40'
CM	10	Michel Platini (c)
CM	12	Alain Giresse
LM	9	Bernard Genghini		(substituted off) 79'
CF	17	Bernard Lacombe		(substituted off) 65'
CF	13	Didier Six
Substitutions:
FW	16	Dominique Rocheteau		(substituted on) 65'
DF	18	Thierry Tusseau		(substituted on) 79'
Manager:
Michel Hidalgo

GK	1	Jean-Marie Pfaff
SW	14	Walter De Greef
CB	2	Georges Grün
CB	3	Paul Lambrichts
CB	5	Michel De Wolf
RM	16	Enzo Scifo		(substituted off) 52'
CM	11	Jan Ceulemans (c)
CM	7	René Vandereycken		(substituted off) 46'
LM	6	Franky Vercauteren
CF	9	Erwin Vandenbergh
CF	8	Nico Claesen	(yellow card) 17'
Substitutions:
MF	10	Ludo Coeck		(substituted on) 46'
MF	15	René Verheyen		(substituted on) 52'
Manager:
Guy Thys

=== Denmark vs Yugoslavia ===
16 June 1984
20:30

Denmark	5–0	Yugoslavia
Arnesen 8', 69' (pen.); Berggreen 16'; Elkjær 82'; Lauridsen 84'	Report

Stade de Gerland, Lyon
Attendance: 34,736
Referee: Augusto Lamo Castillo (Spain)

Denmark	Yugoslavia

GK	20	Ole Qvist
SW	4	Morten Olsen (c)
CB	2	Ole Rasmussen	(substituted off) 61'
CB	5	Ivan Nielsen
CB	3	Søren Busk
RM	11	Klaus Berggreen
CM	15	Frank Arnesen	(substituted off) 79'
CM	7	Jens Jørn Bertelsen
LM	6	Søren Lerby
CF	14	Michael Laudrup
CF	10	Preben Elkjær
Substitutions:
DF	18	John Sivebæk	(substituted on) 61'
MF	13	John Lauridsen	(substituted on) 79'
Manager:
(West Germany) Sepp Piontek

GK	12	Tomislav Ivković
SW	5	Velimir Zajec (c)
CB	15	Branko Miljuš
CB	4	Srečko Katanec	(substituted off) 55'
CB	2	Nenad Stojković
CM	10	Mehmed Baždarević	(substituted off) 27'
CM	8	Ivan Gudelj
CM	6	Ljubomir Radanović
RW	20	Borislav Cvetković
CF	9	Safet Sušić
LW	11	Zlatko Vujović
Substitutions:
MF	16	Dragan Stojković	(substituted on) 27'
FW	19	Sulejman Halilović	(substituted on) 55'
Manager:
Todor Veselinović

=== France vs Yugoslavia ===
19 June 1984
20:30

France	3–2	Yugoslavia
Platini 59', 62', 77'	Report	Šestić 32'; D. Stojković 84' (pen.)

Stade Geoffroy-Guichard, Saint-Étienne
Attendance: 47,510
Referee: André Daina (Switzerland)

France	Yugoslavia

GK	1	Joël Bats
SW	4	Maxime Bossis
CB	5	Patrick Battiston
CB	3	Jean-François Domergue
RM	6	Luis Fernández
CM	14	Jean Tigana
CM	12	Alain Giresse
CM	10	Michel Platini (c)
LM	7	Jean-Marc Ferreri	(substituted off) 77'
CF	16	Dominique Rocheteau	(substituted off) 46'
CF	13	Didier Six
Substitutions:
DF	18	Thierry Tusseau	(substituted on) 46'
MF	8	Daniel Bravo	(substituted on) 77'
Manager:
Michel Hidalgo

GK	1	Zoran Simović
SW	5	Velimir Zajec (c)
CB	6	Ljubomir Radanović
RB	15	Branko Miljuš
LB	2	Nenad Stojković
RM	16	Dragan Stojković
CM	8	Ivan Gudelj
CM	10	Mehmed Baždarević	(substituted off) 84'
LM	7	Miloš Šestić
CF	9	Safet Sušić
CF	11	Zlatko Vujović	(substituted off) 60'
Substitutions:
FW	18	Stjepan Deverić	(substituted on) 60'
MF	4	Srečko Katanec	(substituted on) 84'
Manager:
Todor Veselinović

=== Denmark vs Belgium ===
19 June 1984
20:30

Denmark	3–2	Belgium
Arnesen 41' (pen.); Brylle 60'; Elkjær 84'	Report	Ceulemans 26'; Vercauteren 39'

Stade de la Meinau, Strasbourg
Attendance: 36,911
Referee: Adolf Prokop (East Germany)

Denmark	Belgium

GK	20	Ole Qvist
SW	4	Morten Olsen (c)
CB	2	Ole Rasmussen	(substituted off) 56'
CB	5	Ivan Nielsen
CB	3	Søren Busk
RM	11	Klaus Berggreen
CM	15	Frank Arnesen	(substituted off) 79'
CM	7	Jens Jørn Bertelsen
LM	6	Søren Lerby
CF	14	Michael Laudrup
CF	10	Preben Elkjær
Substitutions:
MF	19	Kenneth Brylle	(substituted on) 56'
DF	18	John Sivebæk	(substituted on) 79'
Manager:
(West Germany) Sepp Piontek

GK	1	Jean-Marie Pfaff
SW	4	Leo Clijsters
CB	2	Georges Grün
CB	14	Walter De Greef	(yellow card) 62'
CB	5	Michel De Wolf
RM	7	René Vandereycken	(yellow card) 65'
CM	16	Enzo Scifo
CM	6	Franky Vercauteren		(substituted off) 62'
LM	11	Jan Ceulemans (c)
CF	9	Erwin Vandenbergh
CF	8	Nico Claesen		(substituted off) 46'
Substitutions:
MF	10	Ludo Coeck		(substituted on) 46'
MF	17	Eddy Voordeckers		(substituted on) 62'
Manager:
Guy Thys

== See also ==
- Belgium at the UEFA European Championship
- Denmark at the UEFA European Championship
- France at the UEFA European Championship
- Yugoslavia at the UEFA European Championship
