= UEFA Euro 1984 knockout stage =

International football tournament stage

The knockout stage of UEFA Euro 1984 was a single-elimination tournament involving the four teams that qualified from the group stage of the tournament. There were two rounds of matches: a semi-final stage leading to the final to decide the champions. The knockout stage began with the semi-finals on 23 June and ended with the final on 27 June at the Parc des Princes in Paris. France won the tournament with a 2–0 victory over Spain.

All times Central European Summer Time (UTC+2)

== Format ==
Any game in the knockout stage that was undecided by the end of the regular 90 minutes was followed by thirty minutes of extra time (two 15-minute halves). If scores were still level after 30 minutes of extra time, there would be a penalty shootout (at least five penalties each, and more if necessary) to determine who progressed to the next round. For the first time at a European Championship, there was no third place play-off.

== Qualified teams ==
The top two placed teams from each of the two groups qualified for the knockout stage.

Group	Winners	Runners-up
1	France	Denmark
2	Spain	Portugal

== Bracket ==
Semi-finals
23 June – Marseille
France (a.e.t.)	3
Portugal	2
24 June – Lyon
Denmark	1 (4)
Spain (p)	1 (5)

Final
27 June – Paris
France	2
Spain	0

== Semi-finals ==
=== France vs Portugal ===
23 June 1984
20:00

France	3–2 (a.e.t.)	Portugal
Domergue 24', 114'; Platini 119'	Report	Jordão 74', 98'

Stade Vélodrome, Marseille
Attendance: 54,848
Referee: Paolo Bergamo (Italy)

France	Portugal

GK	1	Joël Bats
SW	4	Maxime Bossis
CB	5	Patrick Battiston
CB	15	Yvon Le Roux
CB	3	Jean-François Domergue
RM	6	Luis Fernández
CM	14	Jean Tigana
CM	10	Michel Platini (c)
LM	12	Alain Giresse
CF	17	Bernard Lacombe	(yellow card) 44'	(substituted off) 66'
CF	13	Didier Six		(substituted off) 104'
Substitutions:
MF	7	Jean-Marc Ferreri		(substituted on) 66'
MF	11	Bruno Bellone		(substituted on) 104'
Manager:
Michel Hidalgo

GK	1	Manuel Bento (c)
RB	9	João Pinto
CB	10	António Lima Pereira	(yellow card) 26'
CB	11	Eurico Gomes	(yellow card) 89'
LB	17	Álvaro
RM	14	António Frasco
CM	15	Jaime Pacheco
CM	13	António Sousa		(substituted off) 62'
LM	4	Fernando Chalana
CF	3	Rui Jordão
CF	19	Diamantino Miranda		(substituted off) 46'
Substitutions:
FW	6	Fernando Gomes	(yellow card) 104'	(substituted on) 46'
FW	2	Nené		(substituted on) 62'
Manager:
Fernando Cabrita

=== Denmark vs Spain ===
24 June 1984
20:00

Denmark	1–1 (a.e.t.)	Spain
Lerby 7'	Report	Maceda 67'
Penalties
Brylle (penalty scored); J. Olsen (penalty scored); Laudrup (penalty scored); Lerby (penalty scored); Elkjær (penalty missed)	4–5	(penalty scored) Santillana; (penalty scored) Señor; (penalty scored) Urquiaga; (penalty scored) Víctor; (penalty scored) Sarabia

Stade de Gerland, Lyon
Attendance: 47,843
Referee: George Courtney (England)

Denmark	Spain

GK	20	Ole Qvist
SW	4	Morten Olsen (c)		(substituted off) 113'
CB	3	Søren Busk
CB	5	Ivan Nielsen
RM	11	Klaus Berggreen	(yellow card) 71' (yellow-red card) 107'
CM	15	Frank Arnesen		(substituted off) 68'
CM	7	Jens Jørn Bertelsen
CM	18	John Sivebæk
LM	6	Søren Lerby
CF	14	Michael Laudrup
CF	10	Preben Elkjær	(yellow card) 119'
Substitutions:
MF	8	Jesper Olsen	(yellow card) 74'	(substituted on) 68'
FW	19	Kenneth Brylle		(substituted on) 113'
Manager:
(West Germany) Sepp Piontek

GK	1	Luis Arconada (c)	(yellow card) 120'
SW	4	Antonio Maceda	(yellow card) 87'
CB	7	Juan Señor
CB	12	Salva	(yellow card) 24'	(substituted off) 102'
CB	3	José Antonio Camacho
RM	10	Ricardo Gallego
CM	8	Víctor Muñoz	(yellow card) 29'
CM	14	Julio Alberto		(substituted off) 60'
LM	6	Rafael Gordillo	(yellow card) 20'
CF	9	Santillana
CF	11	Lobo Carrasco
Substitutions:
FW	19	Manuel Sarabia		(substituted on) 60'
DF	2	Santiago Urquiaga		(substituted on) 102'
Manager:
Miguel Muñoz

== Final ==
27 June 1984
20:00

France	2–0	Spain
Platini 57'; Bellone 90'	Report

Parc des Princes, Paris
Attendance: 47,368
Referee: Vojtech Christov (Czechoslovakia)

France	Spain

GK	1	Joël Bats
RB	5	Patrick Battiston		(substituted off) 73'
CB	4	Maxime Bossis
CB	15	Yvon Le Roux	(yellow card) 54' (yellow-red card) 85'
LB	3	Jean-François Domergue
DM	6	Luis Fernandez	(yellow card) 30'
CM	12	Alain Giresse
CM	14	Jean Tigana
AM	10	Michel Platini (c)
CF	17	Bernard Lacombe		(substituted off) 80'
CF	11	Bruno Bellone
Substitutions:
DF	2	Manuel Amoros		(substituted on) 73'
FW	9	Bernard Genghini		(substituted on) 80'
Manager:
Michel Hidalgo

GK	1	Luis Arconada (c)
RB	2	Santiago Urquiaga
CB	10	Ricardo Gallego	(yellow card) 26'
CB	12	Salva		(substituted off) 85'
LB	3	José Antonio Camacho
RM	11	Lobo Carrasco	(yellow card) 30'
CM	8	Víctor Muñoz
CM	16	Francisco
LM	14	Julio Alberto		(substituted off) 75'
AM	7	Juan Señor
CF	9	Santillana
Substitutions:
FW	19	Manuel Sarabia		(substituted on) 75'
MF	15	Roberto		(substituted on) 85'
Manager:
Miguel Muñoz
