= History of the Romania national football team =

This article documents the history of the Romania national football team.

== Beginnings ==
Romania played their first international match on 8 June 1923, a 2–1 win over Yugoslavia in Piatra Neamt, on Mihai viteazu street no21 and it was coached by Teofil Moraru. Several temporary coaches were employed, before Moraru resumed control in August 1924, managing the side for nearly four years. Romania enjoyed some success during the 1930s; manager Costel Rădulescu took them to the first three FIFA World Cup tournaments, a feat matched only by Brazil and Belgium.

== World Cups in the 1930s ==
At the 1930 World Cup, Romania won their first match against Peru, 3–1, with goals from Adalbert Deșu, Constantin Stanciu, and Nicolae Kovács, before being thrashed 4-0 by hosts and eventual winners Uruguay.

Romania qualified for the next World Cup in 1934 after beating Yugoslavia 2–1 in a repeat of their first international. At the finals, Romania played only one game in a new knock-out format, losing 2–1 to Czechoslovakia in Trieste, Italy, with Ștefan Dobay scoring their only goal of the tournament.

Romania qualified by default for the 1938 World Cup after their qualifying playoff opponents Egypt withdrew. They suffered a shock defeat in the finals in France, losing to minnows Cuba, who, like Romania, had only qualified due to the withdrawal of their qualifying opponents, Mexico. The first match at the Stade du T.O.E.C. in Toulouse ended 3-3 after extra time, but Cuba won the replay four days later 2–1.

== International Wilderness ==
Between 1950 and 1970, Romania failed to qualify for any major international tournaments.

== 1970 World Cup ==
Participation in the World Cup was finally achieved once again in 1970 in Mexico, although qualification came on the back of a 3-0 thrashing by Portugal in Lisbon and two unconvincing draws against unfancied Greece. Angelo Niculescu's promising were given the toughest of draws, in Group 3 with holders England, giants Brazil and Czechoslovakia.

A Geoff Hurst goal gave England a narrow victory in Romania's first match at the Estadio Jalisco in Guadalajara. Chances were improved with a 2–1 win over the Czechs. Despite going behind early to a Ladislav Petráš goal, Romania turned it around after half-time with Alexandru Neagu and Florea Dumitrache scoring to give them two vital points. Even then, only a win over the excellent Brazilians would take them into the Quarter Finals.

There were rumours before the match that Brazil might prefer Romania to progress than World Champions England; Despite beating them 1–0 in their previous match in Guadalajara, the South American giants still viewed England as one of their biggest obstacles to tournament victory. But Brazil played some of the best football of the competition, with Pelé scoring twice and a Jairzinho goal in between. Romania battled bravely; Dumitrache pulled the score back to 2-1 before the break and a late Emerich Dembrowski goal made it 3–2, but they were out.

== 1970s ==
On 26 September 1973, under new coach Valentin Stănescu, Romania suffered a significant defeat to East Germany in Leipzig. The East Germans won 2–0 to effectively seal their first ever qualification for the World Cup, which would be held in 1974 west of the Inner German border in West Germany. With East Germany scoring a predictable 4–1 win in Albania, Romania were out, despite a huge 9–0 win over Finland in Bucharest.

Romania continued to suffer poor form in the UEFA European Championship. In their qualifying group for the 1976 European Football Championship, they were out-qualified by Spain, despite an impressive 1–1 draw in the away match. Romania failed to win matches, drawing twice with Scotland and Spain and dropping points in Denmark with a dismal goalless draw.

Romania were again beat by Spain for a place in the 1978 World Cup in Argentina. Despite a 1–0 win in Bucharest, Romania lost a bizarre match at home to Yugoslavia 6-4 having led 3–2 at half time. Spain won 1–0 in Belgrade to seal passage to South America.

== 1980s ==
Romania's sole successful qualifying campaign was for the European Championships in 1984 in France. At the finals, Romania were drawn with regular rivals Spain, holders West Germany and dark horses Portugal. Under head coach Mircea Lucescu, an encouraging opening game in Saint-Étienne saw them draw with the Spanish. Francisco José Carrasco opened the scoring from the penalty spot but Romania equalized before half time with a goal from Laszlo Bölöni.

Against the Germans in Lens, Marcel Coras scored an equalizer in the first minute of the second half in response to Rudi Völler's opener, but Völler would score a winning goal. Their last match in Nantes was a must-win match, but Nené's late winner meant Portugal progressed with Spain, who netted a dramatic late winner against West Germany at the Parc des Princes in Paris.

Romania stuttered throughout the rest of the decade, but a stronger squad at the end of the decade saw them qualify for their fifth World Cup at Italia 90. A win over Denmark in their last match took Emerich Jenei's side to the finals for the first time in 20 years.

== Italia 90 ==
Romania's squad was entirely domestic based, despite the increasing trend of the major sides in Italy and Spain buying up foreign talent. Midfielder Ilie Dumitrescu, striker Florin Răducioiu and playmaker Gheorghe Hagi, then of Steaua Bucharest, were in the squad, but it was forward Gavril Balint who led in the first round.

With World Champions Argentina stunned by Cameroon in the tournament's opening match, Romania did their chances no harm with a convincing win over the USSR at the San Nicola in Bari, with Marius Lăcătuș scoring in either half. The result was all the more impressive given the absence of Hagi. There was controversy, however, as Lăcătus's second was a penalty given for a handball by Vagiz Khidiatulin that television replays clearly showed to be some way outside the penalty area.

Romania were the next victims of Cameroon in Bari. Cult hero Roger Milla, 38 years of age, came on as a substitute for Emmanuel Maboang Kessack and scored twice, before Balint pulled one back. Romania needed a point in their last match against improving Argentina at the Stadio San Paolo in Naples. Pedro Monzón gave Argentina the lead after an hour, but Balint quickly equalized and Romania held on to reach Round 2.

Against Jack Charlton's Ireland side in Genoa, Romania did not have the quality to break down a defensive opposition. Daniel Timofte was the only player to miss in the penalty shoot-out – his kick saved by Packie Bonner – and Romania were out. In the process, Ireland became the smallest country ever to progress that far in a FIFA World Cup.

== Euro 92 and USA 94 ==
Romania missed out on Euro 92. Scotland qualified after Romania drew a must-win last match in Sofia against Bulgaria, with Nasko Sirakov's equalizer sealing their fate.

They were successful, though in reaching another World Cup in the United States in 1994. Despite losing in Belgium and suffering a heavy 5–2 defeat in Czechoslovakia, Romania went into their last match at Cardiff Arms Park with Wales needing a win to pip them to a place in the finals. Goals from Gheorghe Hagi and Dean Saunders meant the game was finely balanced, before Wales were awarded a penalty. Paul Bodin of Swindon Town stepped up but hit the woodwork and Romania went on to win 2–1, Răducioiu's late goal proving unnecessary as Czechoslovakia dropped a point in Belgium and were knocked out.

At the finals, Romania were one of the most entertaining teams in the early stages with Hagi, Răducioiu, and Dumitrescu on form. Romania beat Colombia – dark horses and Pelé's tip for the tournament – in the Pasadena Rose Bowl in Los Angeles 3–1. Răducioiu opened the scoring before Hagi scored a spectacular second from wide on the left touchline. Adolfo Valencia's header shredded their nerves with a headed goal just before half-time, but Romania held on and Raducioiu sealed the win with a late third.

In Detroit's Pontiac Silverdome, the temperature soared due to the greenhouse effect in the indoor arena. Switzerland, acclimatized after having already played the hosts there, outran Romania in the second half and turned a 1-1 halftime score into a surprising 4–1 win. Romania responded by beating the hosts 1–0 in Pasadena with an early Dan Petrescu goal.

In Round 2 they faced Argentina, who were shorn of Diego Maradona who was thrown out of the tournament for taking drugs. Răducioiu, suspended, was hardly missed, as coach Anghel Iordănescu pushed Dumitrescu forward to play as a striker and the player responded by scoring twice in the first 20 minutes, one a superbly subtle left foot flick from a right-wing Hagi cross slotted between the Argentine defenders. In between, Gabriel Batistuta scored a penalty but after half-time, Romania scored a superb third on the counterattack with Hagi beating goalkeeper Luis Islas. Abel Balbo pulled one back but Romania held on for a shock win.

Romania would suffer penalty heartbreak again, in the Quarter Final against Sweden. With just 13 minutes to go, a tight match opened up as Sweden's Tomas Brolin scored from a clever free-kick move, the ball passed outside the Romanian wall by Håkan Mild for Brolin to smash in. Iordănescu threw caution to the wind and the returning Răducioiu found a late equalizer, again from a free-kick move but this time down to a deflection and a failure of the Swedes to clear. In extra time Răducioiu scored again after a mistake by Patrik Andersson, but Sweden then scored their own late equalizer as giant striker Kennet Andersson climbed above goalkeeper Florin Prunea to head home a long ball. Prunea had come in after two matches to replace Bogdan Stelea, whose confidence was shattered by the 4–1 loss to the Swiss. In the shoot-out, Petrescu and Miodrag Belodedici had their kicks saved by Thomas Ravelli and Sweden went through.

== Euro 96 ==
In England, Romania arrived as a highly thought-of and popular team but had a nightmare. Iordănescu's side were based in the north east, with their first two games at St James' Park in Newcastle. Against France, they lost to a Christophe Dugarry header reminiscent of Kennet Andersson's two years earlier, beating the goalkeeper to a lofted through ball. A brilliant early solo goal by Hristo Stoichkov saw Bulgaria knock out their neighbours, although Romania claimed they should have had a goal awarded when the ball struck the bar and bounced behind the goal-line. They finally scored in their last game, Florin Răducioiu equalizing an early goal by Spain's Javier Manjarín. Spain had to win to qualify with France at the expense of Bulgaria and did so when Guillermo Amor stooped to head a late winner. Romania exited with no points and little to cheer.

== France 98 ==
Despite a dreadful Euro 96, Romania were seeded when they qualified for the 1998 World Cup with an impressive record in qualifying, finishing ten points clear of Ireland. Despite drawing England, the Group was perceived to be easy work with a waning Colombia and minnows Tunisia.

Adrian Ilie scored the only goal with a fine chip in their first match against Colombia at Lyon's Stade Gerland. In Toulouse, they met an England side starting with prodigal striker Michael Owen on the bench, with Teddy Sheringham preferred alongside Alan Shearer. A mistake by Tony Adams was punished by Viorel Moldovan, who played for Coventry City, before Owen came on to claim an equalizer. But Romania won with a scrappy late goal from Dan Petrescu, also playing in England with Chelsea, fighting off his club mate Graeme le Saux and nutmegging goalkeeper David Seaman.

Having already qualified, Romania bizarrely decided to bleach their hair before their last match against Tunisia, to the amusement of media who nicknamed them 'The Bleach Boys'. Despite England v Colombia being the more decisive game, the Stade de France in Paris was an 80,000 sell out, well populated by the Tunisian diaspora in France, and the crowd were nearly rewarded with a shock as Skander Souayah scored an early penalty to give the north Africans the lead. Romania needed a point to win the group and, crucially, avoid Argentina in Round 2, and got it when Moldovan volleyed a late equalizer. It did them little good, however, as Davor Šuker scored a twice-taken penalty in Bordeaux in a poor match and Romania were out.

== Euro 2000 ==
Romania were not expected to progress through a group containing Portugal, England and Germany. Hagi's powers were waning, Dumitrescu and Răducioiu were no longer on the scene and hopes were pinned on young Internazionale forward Adrian Mutu. Romania started brightly against the Germans in Liège, with Moldovan scoring from close range. A long-range Mehmet Scholl equalizer meant they had to be content with a point and their position looked shaky after Costinha headed a last minute winner for Portugal in their second match.

Emerich Jenei, back as coach, threw caution to the wind in the last match in Charleroi against England, a match which Romania had to win. Defender Cristian Chivu's cross went in off the post in the 22nd minute but, despite Romania dominating, England led at half-time through an Alan Shearer penalty and a late Michael Owen goal after he rounded Bogdan Stelea to score a tap-in, both in the last five minutes of the half. Romania attacked after the break and were quickly rewarded; Dorinel Munteanu punishing a poor punch from Nigel Martyn, a late replacement for the injured Seaman to equalize three minutes after the restart. England cracked under the pressure. Unable to retain possession or pose an attacking threat, they fell deep and late on Phil Neville, playing out of position at left-back, conceded a penalty scored by Ioan Ganea in the 89th minute.

Romania's relief was tempered by tough opposition in the last eight, and Italy, who would end up seconds from being crowned European champions in an agonizing final, comfortably saw them off 2–0 in Brussels. Francesco Totti and Filippo Inzaghi scoring towards the end of the first half. After the break Hagi, in his final international tournament, hit the woodwork with goalkeeper Francesco Toldo stranded off his line and was magnanimously sent off for diving. Romania's tournament was over and Jenei, an ethnic Hungarian as were many of Romania's players of his generation, left his job as coach again.

== 2000s – Near Misses ==
Romania failed to qualify for the next three major tournaments. They drew Slovenia, who had been surprise qualifiers for Euro 2000 in a playoff for a place in the 2002 World Cup in Korea and Japan. A narrow 2–1 deficit – having led through a Marius Niculae goal – after the first leg in Ljubljana was not irretrievable. With fans' hero Gheorghe Hagi now coaching the side they were confident of getting the win they needed in Bucharest against the Balkan upstarts, but Slovenia took the lead before the hour through Mladen Rudonja. Right wing-back Cosmin Contra quickly equalized but Romania could not find the goal they needed to force extra time and Slovenia, with maverick manager Srečko Katanec, were in a major tournament again.

Romania were confident of qualifying for Euro 2004 in Portugal, drawn in Group 2 with seeds Denmark, Norway, Bosnia-Herzegovina and minnows Luxembourg. Despite a good start – a 3–0 win away to Bosnia in Sarajevo, Romania stuttered. Steffen Iversen's late goal gave Norway a surprise win in Bucharest and they were stunned at home by the Danes, 5–2, with Thomas Gravesen scoring a spectacular goal from around fifty yards out, despite leading twice. They recovered slightly, completing a double over the Bosnians and getting a point in Oslo, but conceded a cutting injury time equalizer in Denmark to draw 2-2. It was decisive, as they now required Norway to fail to win at home to Luxembourg to stand any realistic chance of qualifying. Eventually, the Danes got a point in Bosnia to scrape through a tight group, with Norway going to a play-off with Spain.

Romania were put in a massive group for the qualifying tournament for the 2006 FIFA World Cup in Germany. The Netherlands and Czech Republic were favourite to qualify. Early wins over Finland and Macedonia were unconvincing, and they were some way behind the two leaders by the time they earned a good 2–0 home win over the Czechs. They finished third behind the Dutch and the Czechs and missed out on another major tournament.

== Euro 2008 ==
Romania managed to qualify with two games still to be played, from a group featuring Netherlands and Bulgaria. Their 'reward' was a place in the so-called Group of Death, Group C alongside world champions Italy, Euro 2000 winners France and the Netherlands.

Despite the tough draw, Romania performed well in their first two games played in the Letzigrund Stadion in Zürich. They held a poor French side to a goalless draw in the tea-time kick-off, before the Netherlands sensationally beat Italy 3–0 in Bern. Four days later they played the World Champions knowing a win would knock the Italians out. Coach Victor Pițurcă changed the formation from 4 to 3–3 to 4-1-3-2, with Adrian Mutu pushed inside from the left wing to partner Daniel Niculae up-front, with the other winger Bănel Nicoliță kept on the bench. They took the lead in the second half when pounced on a slack backpass by the Italian right-back Gianluca Zambrotta but Christian Panucci equalized barely a minute later with a tap-in from a corner kick. Italy needed to hold on to the point to have any chance of qualifying for the quarter finals and feared the worst when Romania were awarded a penalty inside the last ten minutes. However, Mutu's penalty was saved by Gianluigi Buffon, rescuing Italy.

The 1–1 draw meant that Romania could still progress if they beat the Dutch in their final group match in Bern, but the Netherlands were regarded as the outstanding team in the tournament, having followed their comprehensive win against Italy with an equally emphatic 4–1 win over France. A draw would also take Romania through were the other match between Italy and France to be drawn.

With Italy taking a first-half lead against a France side reduced to ten men, it became apparent that Romania needed to beat the Netherlands to qualify. However, they played poorly and the Netherlands won 2–0 with second half goals from Klaas-Jan Huntelaar and Robin van Persie. Although eliminated, Romania were viewed to have fare well given their extraordinarily difficult group, finishing above France in the final table with two points. Pițurcă, coach since the start of the 2006 FIFA World Cup qualification campaign, retained his position.

== 2010 World Cup qualifying ==
Romania were drawn into Group 7 in the European qualifying tournament along with France, Serbia, Lithuania, Austria and the Faroe Islands. The campaign started in September 2008: they began disastrously, losing 3–0 at home to unfancied Lithuania in Cluj-Napoca before scraping an unconvincing 1–0 win in the Faroe Islands, midfielder Răzvan Cociș scoring the goal. Their third match would be at home to France, who had also begun with a bad loss, 3–1 to Austria in Vienna. Romania raced into a 2–0 lead in Constanța with goals from Florentin Petre and Dorin Goian but France pulled one back before half time through Franck Ribéry. A long-range strike from Yoann Gourcuff earned France a draw but both sides were left with plenty to do to qualify for the finals in South Africa.

Romania finished fifth in the table, ten points adrift of leaders Serbia.

== Euro 2012 qualifiers ==
Romania was placed in Group D for the UEFA Euro 2012 qualifiers, alongside France, Bosnia and Herzegovina, Belarus, Albania, and Luxembourg.

The campaign began on 3 September 2010 with a 1-1 home draw against Albania. Then, on the 7th of September, Romania earned a 0-0 draw away to Belarus. On the 9th of October, Romania suffered a 2-0 away loss to France in Paris.

On 26 March 2011, the team lost 2-1 against Bosnia and Herzegovina in Zenica. Later, the team bounced back with a 3-1 home win against Luxembourg, with Adrian Mutu scoring a brace.

Then, on 3 June 2011, Romania secured a 3-0 home win against Bosnia and Herzegovina. During this match, Ciprian Marica scored two goals.

On 2 September 2011, Romania defeated Luxembourg away 2-0, with Gabriel Torje scoring a brace. Then, Romania drew 0-0 with France. Romania then recorded back-to-back draws against Belarus and Albania.

Romania finished the group in third place, accumulating 14 points. They had not succeeded for qualifying for the UEFA Euro 2012 tournament.

== Kit history ==
WC 1990 Home	WC 1990 Away	WC 1994 Home	WC 1994 Away	1996 Home	WC 1998 Home	WC 1998 Away	2000 Home	2006 Home	2008 Home

2008 Away	2010 Home	2010 Away	2012 Home	2012 Away	2014 Home	2014 Away	2015 Home	2015 Away
