= Romania at the UEFA European Championship =

International football delegation

Romania have appeared at six UEFA European Championships between 1984 and 2024. Their best performance so far was reaching the quarter-finals of Euro 2000, when they were eliminated by eventual tournament runners-up Italy.

== Euro 1984 ==
=== Group stage ===
Pos	Team	Pld	W	D	L	GF	GA	GD	Pts	Qualification
1	Spain	3	1	2	0	3	2	+1	4	Advance to knockout stage
2	Portugal	3	1	2	0	2	1	+1	4	Advance to knockout stage
3	West Germany	3	1	1	1	2	2	0	3	
4	Romania	3	0	1	2	2	4	−2	1	

Source: UEFA
Rules for classification: Group stage tiebreakers
14 June 1984
20:30

Romania	1–1	Spain
Bölöni 35'	Report	Carrasco 22' (pen.)

Stade Geoffroy-Guichard, Saint-Étienne
Attendance: 16,972
Referee: Alexis Ponnet (Belgium)

17 June 1984
17:15

West Germany	2–1	Romania
Völler 25', 66'	Report	Coraș 46'

Stade Félix-Bollaert, Lens
Attendance: 31,787
Referee: Jan Keizer (Netherlands)

20 June 1984
20:30

Portugal	1–0	Romania
Nené 81'	Report

Stade de la Beaujoire, Nantes
Attendance: 24,464
Referee: Heinz Fahnler (Austria)

== Euro 1996 ==
=== Group stage ===
Pos	Team	Pld	W	D	L	GF	GA	GD	Pts	Qualification
1	France	3	2	1	0	5	2	+3	7	Advance to knockout stage
2	Spain	3	1	2	0	4	3	+1	5	Advance to knockout stage
3	Bulgaria	3	1	1	1	3	4	−1	4	
4	Romania	3	0	0	3	1	4	−3	0	

Source: UEFA
Rules for classification: Group stage tiebreakers
10 June 1996
19:30

Romania	0–1	France
	Report	Dugarry 25'

St James' Park, Newcastle
Attendance: 26,323
Referee: Hellmut Krug (Germany)

13 June 1996
16:30

Bulgaria	1–0	Romania
Stoichkov 3'	Report

St James' Park, Newcastle
Attendance: 19,107
Referee: Peter Mikkelsen (Denmark)

18 June 1996
16:30

Romania	1–2	Spain
Răducioiu 29'	Report	Manjarín 11'; Amor 84'

Elland Road, Leeds
Attendance: 32,719
Referee: Ahmet Çakar (Turkey)

== Euro 2000 ==
=== Group stage ===
Pos	Team	Pld	W	D	L	GF	GA	GD	Pts	Qualification
1	Portugal	3	3	0	0	7	2	+5	9	Advance to knockout stage
2	Romania	3	1	1	1	4	4	0	4	Advance to knockout stage
3	England	3	1	0	2	5	6	−1	3	
4	Germany	3	0	1	2	1	5	−4	1	

Source: UEFA
Rules for classification: Group stage tiebreakers
12 June 2000
18:00

Germany	1–1	Romania
Scholl 28'	Report	Moldovan 5'

Stade Maurice Dufrasne, Liège
Attendance: 28,500
Referee: Kim Milton Nielsen (Denmark)

17 June 2000
18:00

Romania	0–1	Portugal
	Report	Costinha 90+4'

GelreDome, Arnhem
Attendance: 28,400
Referee: Gilles Veissière (France)

20 June 2000
20:45

England	2–3	Romania
Shearer 41' (pen.); Owen 45'	Report	Chivu 22'; Munteanu 48'; Ganea 89' (pen.)

Stade du Pays de Charleroi, Charleroi
Attendance: 30,000
Referee: Urs Meier (Switzerland)

=== Knockout stage ===
Quarter-finals

24 June 2000
20:45

Italy	2–0	Romania
Totti 33'; Inzaghi 43'	Report

King Baudouin Stadium, Brussels
Attendance: 41,000
Referee: Vítor Melo Pereira (Portugal)

== Euro 2008 ==
=== Group stage ===
Pos	Team	Pld	W	D	L	GF	GA	GD	Pts	Qualification
1	Netherlands	3	3	0	0	9	1	+8	9	Advance to knockout stage
2	Italy	3	1	1	1	3	4	−1	4	Advance to knockout stage
3	Romania	3	0	2	1	1	3	−2	2	
4	France	3	0	1	2	1	6	−5	1	

Source: UEFA
Rules for classification: Group stage tiebreakers
9 June 2008
18:00

Romania	0–0	France
	Report

Letzigrund, Zürich
Attendance: 30,585
Referee: Manuel Mejuto González (Spain)

13 June 2008
18:00

Italy	1–1	Romania
Panucci 56'	Report	Mutu 55'

Letzigrund, Zürich
Attendance: 30,585
Referee: Tom Henning Øvrebø (Norway)

17 June 2008
20:45

Netherlands	2–0	Romania
Huntelaar 54'; Van Persie 87'	Report

Stade de Suisse, Bern
Attendance: 30,777
Referee: Massimo Busacca (Switzerland)

== Euro 2016 ==
=== Group stage ===
Pos	Team	Pld	W	D	L	GF	GA	GD	Pts	Qualification
1	France (H)	3	2	1	0	4	1	+3	7	Advance to knockout stage
2	Switzerland	3	1	2	0	2	1	+1	5	Advance to knockout stage
3	Albania	3	1	0	2	1	3	−2	3	
4	Romania	3	0	1	2	2	4	−2	1	

Source: UEFA
Rules for classification: Group stage tiebreakers
(H) Hosts
10 June 2016
21:00

France	2–1	Romania
Giroud 57'; Payet 89'	Report	Stancu 65' (pen.)

Stade de France, Saint-Denis
Attendance: 75,113
Referee: Viktor Kassai (Hungary)

15 June 2016
18:00

Romania	1–1	Switzerland
Stancu 18' (pen.)	Report	Mehmedi 57'

Parc des Princes, Paris
Attendance: 43,576
Referee: Sergei Karasev (Russia)

19 June 2016
21:00

Romania	0–1	Albania
	Report	Sadiku 43'

Parc Olympique Lyonnais, Décines-Charpieu
Attendance: 49,752
Referee: Pavel Královec (Czech Republic)

== Euro 2024 ==
=== Group stage ===
Pos	Team	Pld	W	D	L	GF	GA	GD	Pts	Qualification
1	Romania	3	1	1	1	4	3	+1	4	Advance to knockout stage
2	Belgium	3	1	1	1	2	1	+1	4	Advance to knockout stage
3	Slovakia	3	1	1	1	3	3	0	4	Advance to knockout stage
4	Ukraine	3	1	1	1	2	4	−2	4	

Source: UEFA
17 June 2024
15:00

Romania	3–0	Ukraine
Stanciu 29'; R. Marin 53'; Drăguș 57'	Report

Allianz Arena, Munich
Attendance: 61,591
Referee: Glenn Nyberg (Sweden)

22 June 2024
21:00

Belgium	2–0	Romania
Tielemans 2'; De Bruyne 80'	Report

RheinEnergieStadion, Cologne
Attendance: 42,535
Referee: Szymon Marciniak (Poland)

26 June 2024
18:00

Slovakia	1–1	Romania
Duda 24'	Report	R. Marin 37' (pen.)

Waldstadion, Frankfurt
Attendance: 45,033
Referee: Daniel Siebert (Germany)

=== Knockout stage ===
Round of 16

2 July 2024
18:00

Romania	0–3	Netherlands
	Report	Gakpo 20'; Malen 83', 90+3'

Allianz Arena, Munich
Attendance: 65,012
Referee: Felix Zwayer (Germany)

== Record players ==
Rank	Player	Matches	Tournaments
1	Gheorghe Hagi	8	1984, 1996 and 2000
2	Cristian Chivu	7	2000 and 2008
2	Dorinel Munteanu	7	1996 and 2000
4	Cosmin Contra	6	2000 and 2008
4	Constantin Gâlcă	6	1996 and 2000
4	Adrian Ilie	6	1996 and 2000
4	Viorel Moldovan	6	1996 and 2000
4	Adrian Mutu	6	2000 and 2008
4	Dan Petrescu	6	1996 and 2000
4	Gheorghe Popescu	6	1996 and 2000
4	Nicolae Stanciu	6	2016 and 2024
4	Bogdan Stelea	6	1996 and 2000

== Goalscorers ==
Player	Goals	1984	1996	2000	2008	2016	2024
Răzvan Marin	2						2
Bogdan Stancu	2					2	
László Bölöni	1	1					
Cristian Chivu	1			1			
Marcel Coraș	1	1					
Denis Drăguș	1						1
Ionel Ganea	1			1			
Viorel Moldovan	1			1			
Dorinel Munteanu	1			1			
Adrian Mutu	1				1		
Florin Răducioiu	1		1				
Nicolae Stanciu	1						1
Total	14	2	1	4	1	2	4

== Overall record ==
UEFA European Championship record									Qualification record						
Year	Round	Position	Pld	W	D*	L	GF	GA	Position	Pld	W	D	L	GF	GA
(France) 1960	Did not qualify								Quarter-finals	4	1	0	3	3	7
(Spain) 1964	Did not qualify								Preliminary round	2	1	0	1	3	7
(Italy) 1968	Did not qualify								First round	6	3	0	3	18	14
(Belgium) 1972	Did not qualify								Quarter-finals	9	4	3	2	15	7
(Socialist Federal Republic of Yugoslavia) 1976	Did not qualify								First round	6	1	5	0	11	6
(Italy) 1980	Did not qualify								3rd	6	2	2	2	9	8
(France) 1984	Group stage	7th	3	0	1	2	2	4	1st	8	5	2	1	9	3
(West Germany) 1988	Did not qualify								2nd	6	4	1	1	13	3
(Sweden) 1992	Did not qualify								3rd	8	4	2	2	13	7
(England) 1996	Group stage	15th	3	0	0	3	1	4	1st	10	6	3	1	18	9
(Belgium) (Netherlands) 2000	Quarter-finals	7th	4	1	1	2	4	6	1st	10	7	3	0	25	3
(Portugal) 2004	Did not qualify								3rd	8	4	2	2	21	9
(Austria) (Switzerland) 2008	Group stage	12th	3	0	2	1	1	3	1st	12	9	2	1	26	7
(Poland) (Ukraine) 2012	Did not qualify								3rd	10	3	5	2	13	9
(France) 2016	Group stage	19th	3	0	1	2	2	4	2nd	10	5	5	0	11	2
(Europe) 2020	Did not qualify								Play-offs	11	4	2	5	18	17
(Germany) 2024	Round of 16	13th	4	1	1	2	4	6	1st	10	6	4	0	16	5
(United Kingdom) (Republic of Ireland) 2028	To be determined								To be determined						
(Italy) (Turkey) 2032	To be determined								To be determined						
Total	Quarter-finals	6/17	20	2	6	12	14	27	Total	136	69	41	26	242	123

*Denotes draws including knockout matches decided via penalty shoot-out.
**Red border colour indicates that the tournament was held on home soil.

== Head-to-head record ==
Opponent	Pld	W	D	L	GF	GA
Albania	1	0	0	1	0	1
Belgium	1	0	0	1	0	2
Bulgaria	1	0	0	1	0	1
England	1	1	0	0	3	2
France	3	0	1	2	1	3
Germany	1	0	1	0	1	1
Italy	2	0	1	1	1	3
Netherlands	2	0	0	2	0	5
Portugal	2	0	0	2	0	2
Spain	2	0	1	1	2	3
Slovakia	1	0	1	0	1	1
Switzerland	1	0	1	0	1	1
Ukraine	1	1	0	0	3	0
West Germany	1	0	0	1	1	2
Total	20	2	6	12	14	27

== See also ==
- Romania at the FIFA World Cup
