= UEFA Euro 1984 Group 2 =

Football tournament group stage

Group 2 of UEFA Euro 1984 was one of only two groups in the final tournament's initial group stage. It began on 14 June and was completed on 20 June. The group consisted of West Germany, Spain, Portugal, and Romania.

Spain won the group and advanced to the semi-finals along with Portugal. West Germany and Romania were eliminated.

== Teams ==
Team	Method of qualification	Date of qualification	Finals appearance	Last appearance	Previous best performance
Portugal	Group 2 winner	1 November 1983	1st	—	Debut
Romania	Group 5 winner	30 November 1983	1st	—	Debut
Spain	Group 7 winner	21 December 1983	3rd	1980	Winners (1964)
West Germany	Group 6 winner	20 November 1983	4th	1980	Winners (1972, 1980)

== Standings ==
Pos	Team	Pld	W	D	L	GF	GA	GD	Pts	Qualification
1	Spain	3	1	2	0	3	2	+1	4	Advance to knockout stage
2	Portugal	3	1	2	0	2	1	+1	4	Advance to knockout stage
3	West Germany	3	1	1	1	2	2	0	3	
4	Romania	3	0	1	2	2	4	−2	1	

Source: UEFA
Rules for classification: Group stage tiebreakers

In the semi-finals,

- The winner of Group 2, Spain, advanced to play the runner-up of Group 1, Denmark.
- The runner-up of Group 2, Portugal, advanced to play the winner of Group 1, France.

== Matches ==
=== West Germany vs Portugal ===
14 June 1984
17:15

West Germany	0–0	Portugal
	Report

Stade de la Meinau, Strasbourg
Attendance: 44,707
Referee: Romualdas Juška (Soviet Union)

West Germany	Portugal

GK	1	Harald Schumacher
SW	15	Uli Stielike
CB	5	Bernd Förster
CB	4	Karlheinz Förster
CB	2	Hans-Peter Briegel
RM	18	Guido Buchwald	(substituted off) 67'
CM	11	Karl-Heinz Rummenigge (c)
CM	6	Wolfgang Rolff	(substituted off) 67'
LM	7	Andreas Brehme
CF	9	Rudi Völler
CF	8	Klaus Allofs
Substitutions:
MF	13	Lothar Matthäus	(substituted on) 67'
MF	19	Rudi Bommer	(substituted on) 67'
Manager:
Jupp Derwall

GK	1	Manuel Bento (c)
RB	9	João Pinto
CB	10	António Lima Pereira
CB	11	Eurico
LB	17	Álvaro	(yellow card) 40'
RM	7	Carlos Manuel
CM	14	António Frasco		(substituted off) 79'
CM	15	Jaime Pacheco
LM	13	António Sousa
CF	4	Fernando Chalana
CF	3	Rui Jordão		(substituted off) 85'
Substitutions:
DF	8	António Veloso		(substituted on) 79'
FW	6	Fernando Gomes		(substituted on) 85'
Manager:
Fernando Cabrita

=== Romania vs Spain ===
14 June 1984
20:30

Romania	1–1	Spain
Bölöni 35'	Report	Carrasco 22' (pen.)

Stade Geoffroy-Guichard, Saint-Étienne
Attendance: 16,972
Referee: Alexis Ponnet (Belgium)

Romania	Spain

GK	1	Silviu Lung
SW	3	Costică Ștefănescu (c)
CB	2	Mircea Rednic
CB	6	Gino Iorgulescu	(yellow card) 74'
CB	4	Nicolae Ungureanu
RM	7	Marcel Coraș
CM	10	László Bölöni
CM	8	Michael Klein
LM	15	Marin Dragnea		(substituted off) 57'
CF	9	Rodion Cămătaru
CF	19	Romulus Gabor		(substituted off) 76'
Substitutions:
MF	5	Aurel Țicleanu		(substituted on) 57'
MF	11	Gheorghe Hagi		(substituted on) 76'
Manager:
Mircea Lucescu

GK	1	Luis Arconada (c)
SW	4	Antonio Maceda
CB	2	Santiago Urquiaga
CB	5	Andoni Goikoetxea
CB	3	José Antonio Camacho
RM	7	Juan Señor
CM	8	Víctor Muñoz
CM	10	Ricardo Gallego	(substituted off) 73'
LM	6	Rafael Gordillo
CF	9	Santillana
CF	11	Lobo Carrasco
Substitutions:
DF	14	Julio Alberto	(substituted on) 73'
Manager:
Miguel Muñoz

=== West Germany vs Romania ===
17 June 1984
17:15

West Germany	2–1	Romania
Völler 25', 66'	Report	Coraș 46'

Stade Félix-Bollaert, Lens
Attendance: 31,787
Referee: Jan Keizer (Netherlands)

West Germany	Romania

GK	1	Harald Schumacher
SW	15	Uli Stielike	(yellow card) 26'
CB	5	Bernd Förster
CB	4	Karlheinz Förster		(substituted off) 80'
CB	2	Hans-Peter Briegel
CM	13	Lothar Matthäus
CM	10	Norbert Meier		(substituted off) 65'
CM	7	Andreas Brehme
RW	11	Karl-Heinz Rummenigge (c)
CF	9	Rudi Völler
LW	8	Klaus Allofs
Substitutions:
MF	17	Pierre Littbarski		(substituted on) 65'
DF	18	Guido Buchwald		(substituted on) 80'
Manager:
Jupp Derwall

GK	1	Silviu Lung
SW	3	Costică Ștefănescu (c)	(yellow card) 47'
CB	2	Mircea Rednic
CB	13	Ioan Andone
CB	4	Nicolae Ungureanu
RM	7	Marcel Coraș
CM	10	László Bölöni
CM	8	Michael Klein
LM	15	Marin Dragnea		(substituted off) 62'
CF	9	Rodion Cămătaru
CF	11	Gheorghe Hagi		(substituted off) 46'
Substitutions:
FW	17	Ion Adrian Zare		(substituted on) 46'
MF	5	Aurel Țicleanu		(substituted on) 62'
Manager:
Mircea Lucescu

=== Portugal vs Spain ===
17 June 1984
20:30

Portugal	1–1	Spain
Sousa 52'	Report	Santillana 73'

Stade Vélodrome, Marseille
Attendance: 24,364
Referee: Michel Vautrot (France)

Portugal	Spain

GK	1	Manuel Bento (c)
RB	9	João Pinto	(yellow card) 44'
CB	10	António Lima Pereira
CB	11	Eurico
LB	17	Álvaro
RM	7	Carlos Manuel
CM	14	António Frasco		(substituted off) 76'
CM	15	Jaime Pacheco
CM	13	António Sousa
LM	4	Fernando Chalana
CF	3	Rui Jordão
Substitutions:
FW	19	Diamantino		(substituted on) 76'
Manager:
Fernando Cabrita

GK	1	Luis Arconada (c)
SW	4	Antonio Maceda
CB	2	Santiago Urquiaga		(substituted off) 79'
CB	5	Andoni Goikoetxea
CB	3	José Antonio Camacho
RM	10	Ricardo Gallego
CM	8	Víctor Muñoz
CM	14	Julio Alberto		(substituted off) 70'
LM	6	Rafael Gordillo
CF	9	Santillana
CF	11	Lobo Carrasco	(yellow card) 25'
Substitutions:
FW	19	Manuel Sarabia		(substituted on) 70'
MF	7	Juan Señor		(substituted on) 79'
Manager:
Miguel Muñoz

=== West Germany vs Spain ===
20 June 1984
20:30

West Germany	0–1	Spain
	Report	Maceda 90'

Parc des Princes, Paris
Attendance: 47,691
Referee: Vojtech Christov (Czechoslovakia)

West Germany	Spain

GK	1	Harald Schumacher
SW	15	Uli Stielike
CB	5	Bernd Förster
CB	4	Karlheinz Förster
CB	2	Hans-Peter Briegel
CM	13	Lothar Matthäus
CM	10	Norbert Meier	(substituted off) 60'
CM	7	Andreas Brehme	(substituted off) 76'
RW	11	Karl-Heinz Rummenigge (c)
CF	9	Rudi Völler
LW	8	Klaus Allofs
Substitutions:
MF	6	Wolfgang Rolff	(substituted on) 76'
MF	17	Pierre Littbarski	(substituted on) 60'
Manager:
Jupp Derwall

GK	1	Luis Arconada (c)
SW	4	Antonio Maceda
CB	7	Juan Señor
CB	5	Andoni Goikoetxea	(yellow card) 26'	(substituted off) 26'
CB	3	José Antonio Camacho
RM	10	Ricardo Gallego
CM	8	Víctor Muñoz
CM	14	Julio Alberto		(substituted off) 76'
LM	6	Rafael Gordillo
CF	9	Santillana
CF	11	Lobo Carrasco
Substitutions:
DF	12	Salvador García		(substituted on) 26'
MF	16	Francisco López		(substituted on) 76'
Manager:
Miguel Muñoz

=== Portugal vs Romania ===
20 June 1984
20:30

Portugal	1–0	Romania
Nené 81'	Report

Stade de la Beaujoire, Nantes
Attendance: 24,464
Referee: Heinz Fahnler (Austria)

Portugal	Romania

GK	1	Manuel Bento (c)
RB	9	João Pinto
CB	10	António Lima Pereira
CB	11	Eurico
LB	17	Álvaro
RM	14	António Frasco
CM	7	Carlos Manuel		(substituted off) 63'
CM	13	António Sousa
LM	4	Fernando Chalana		(substituted off) 15'
CF	3	Rui Jordão
CF	6	Fernando Gomes
Substitutions:
FW	19	Diamantino	(yellow card) 77'	(substituted on) 15'
FW	2	Nené		(substituted on) 63'
Manager:
Fernando Cabrita

GK	12	Dumitru Moraru
SW	3	Costică Ștefănescu (c)
CB	16	Nicolae Negrilă
CB	6	Gino Iorgulescu	(yellow card) 26'
CB	4	Nicolae Ungureanu
RM	2	Mircea Rednic
CM	10	László Bölöni
CM	8	Michael Klein
LM	14	Mircea Irimescu	(yellow card) 14'	(substituted off) 59'
CF	7	Marcel Coraș
CF	9	Rodion Cămătaru		(substituted off) 34'
Substitutions:
MF	18	Ionel Augustin		(substituted on) 34'
FW	19	Romulus Gabor		(substituted on) 59'
Manager:
Mircea Lucescu

== See also ==
- Germany at the UEFA European Championship
- Portugal at the UEFA European Championship
- Romania at the UEFA European Championship
- Spain at the UEFA European Championship
