= Romualdas Juška =

Lithuanian footballer and referee

Personal information
- Full name: Romualdas Zigmovich Juška
- Date of birth: 26 December 1941 (age 84)
- Place of birth: Kvėdarna, Lithuania
- Position: Forward

Senior career*
Years	Team	Apps	(Gls)
1959–1961	FK Baltija Klaipėda		
1962–1965	FK Žalgiris	107	(34)
1966–1967	SKA Lviv	46	(5)
1967	CSKA Moscow	8	(0)
1968–1969	FC Metalist Kharkiv	66	(21)
1970–1971	FK Žalgiris	59	(11)
1971–1973	FK Pažanga Vilnius		
Refereeing career
Domestic
Years	League	Role
1975–1995	Soviet Top League	Referee
International
Years	League	Role
1979–1985	FIFA listed	Referee
- * Club domestic league appearances and goals

Romualdas Zigmovich Juška (Russian: Ромуа́льдас Зи́гмович Ю́шка, romanized: Romualdas Zigmovich Yushka; born 1 February 1942) is a retired Lithuanian football player and referee from the Soviet era.

== Football career ==
From 1959 to 1973, Juška was an active footballer who played as a forward. In 1970, during his second stint at FK Žalgiris, he was named Lithuanian Footballer of the Year.

== Refereeing career ==
In 1975, Juška passed the referee exam and began officiating in the Soviet Top League. In 1979, he was appointed as a FIFA referee representing the Football Federation of the Soviet Union.

In 1984, he was appointed as a referee for UEFA Euro 1984, where he officiated a group stage match between West Germany and Portugal.

Juška stopped officiating internationally in 1985, before retiring from refereeing in 1995.
