= Orlando Engelaar =

Dutch footballer (born 1979)

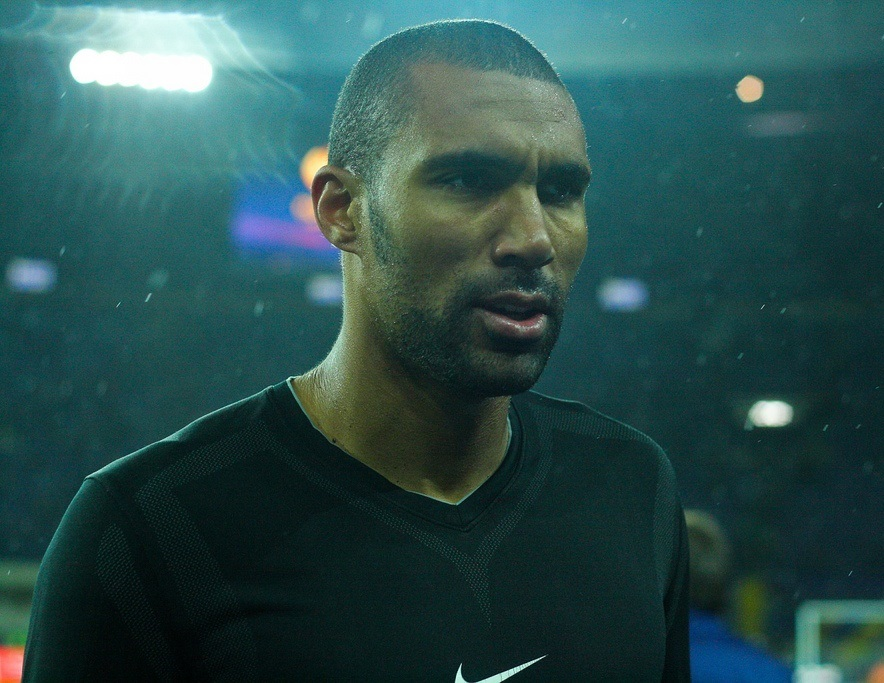
- Engelaar with PSV in 2010

Personal information
- Date of birth: 24 August 1979 (age 47)
- Place of birth: Rotterdam, Netherlands
- Height: 1.96 m (6 ft 5 in)
- Position: Midfielder

Youth career
- 1985–2000: Feyenoord

Senior career*
Years	Team	Apps	(Gls)
2000–2004	NAC	94	(22)
2004–2006	Genk	59	(12)
2006–2008	Twente	56	(8)
2008–2009	Schalke 04	25	(0)
2009–2013	PSV	75	(6)
2013–2014	Melbourne Heart (Note: Melbourne Heart changed its name to Melbourne City FC in 2014.)	12	(5)
2014–2015	Twente	11	(2)
Total		332	(55)

International career
2007–2010	Netherlands	14	(0)
- * Club domestic league appearances and goals

Orlando Engelaar (Dutch pronunciation: [ɔrˈlɑndoː ˈɛŋəlaːr]; born 24 August 1979) is a Dutch former professional footballer who played as a midfielder. Known for his imposing physical presence and passing range, he represented the Netherlands at UEFA Euro 2008.

== Club career ==
=== NAC Breda ===
Born in Rotterdam, Netherlands, Engelaar began playing football when he was seven years old and said: "Football is my life. I'm working on it day and night." Engelaar then joined Feyenoord in the youth system at the same age after being invited to an open day. He quickly impressed the Feyenoord's management and joined the academy. Engelaar then spent fifteen years at Feyenoord". Having started out playing as a striker, Engelaar eventually settled into a midfield or defensive role where he impressed with his aerial and passing abilities. He then explained his final years at the academy, saying: "I had now signed a three-year contract at the age of eighteen. In the first half of the second season I had to come back from that injury. That took time, of course. I was told I could leave. I was able to go to the Excelsior satellite club. But I didn't see it that way. That club then played - nine, ten years ago - without any prospects in the first division. At that time there were few examples of players who came out well again. I'm not going to be stabled at Excelsior, you do that with a cow.' At his father's request, he accepted the invitation to play with the Suriprofs team. That was then coached by Henk ten Cate. Engelaar left such a good impression that the Amsterdam trainer offered him a contract on behalf of NAC. But then Feyenoord did not want to lose the midfielder anymore - he had started to play better again." After fifteen years at Feyenoord, Engelaar then joined NAC Breda, which was the club that saw him started his professional football career.

Engelaar made his debut for NAC Breda on the left side of midfield, featuring the full 90 minutes in a 1–0 loss to RKC Waalwijk on 19 August 2000. Following this, he spent two seasons, rotating in and out of the first team, resulting in him combined making the appearances of thirty–three appearances in the first two seasons at the club. The 2002–03 season proved to be a breakthrough for Engelaar, as he became a first team regular for NAC Breda. Engelaar then scored his first goals for the club, eventually scoring twice from two thunderous drives into the back-of-the-net, in a 2–0 win against Heerenveen on 14 September 2002. On 5 October 2002, he scored another brace, in a 2–2 draw against PSV Eindhoven. This was followed up by scoring his fifth goal of the season, in a 3–0 win against FC Zwolle. Engelaar then scored two more goals by the end of the year against RKC Waalwijk and Excelsior. His goal scoring form continued throughout May and helped the club qualify for the UEFA Europa League next season by finishing fourth place in the league. At the end of the 2002–03 season, Engelaar went on to make thirty–five appearances and scoring twelve times in all competitions.

At the start of the 2003–04 season, Engelaar signed a three-year contract with NAC Breda, keeping him until 2007. He played both legs in the first round of UEFA Cup against Premier League side Newcastle United, as the club lost 6–0 on aggregate. Shortly after NAC Breda's elimination from the tournament, Engelaar scored his first goal of the season, in a 3–0 win against NEC Nijmegen on 19 October 2003. Two weeks later on 1 November 2003, he scored his second goal of the season, in a 3–1 loss against PSV Eindhoven. Engelaar then scored four goals in three matches between 12 December 2003 and 24 January 2004, including a brace against RBC Roosendaal. He later scored twice for the club, in a 5–2 win against NEC Nijmegen on 27 March 2004. Two weeks later on 11 April 2004, Engelaar scored his ninth goal of the season, in a 2–2 draw against Vitesse. At the end of the 2003–04 season, he went on to make thirty–four appearances and scoring nine times in all competitions.

=== KRC Genk ===
At the start of the 2004–05 season, Engelaar joined Belgian club Racing Genk on a four-year contract. Prior to his departure from NAC Breda, he made his last appearance for the club against Utrecht in the opening game of the season and scored in a 3–2 win. However, the transfer move resulted NAC Breda suing Genk in court.

Engelaar made his debut for Genk against Lokeren on 22 August 2005 and started the whole game, in a 2–1 win. Since joining the club, he immediately made an impact in the starting eleven, playing in the midfield position. Engelaar then scored his first goal for Genk, in a 2–2 draw against Mons on 16 October 2004. This was followed by scoring against Anderlecht (twice), Sint-Truidense and Beveren. Three weeks later on 27 November 2004, he scored his sixth goal for the club, in a 3–1 win against Oostende. Engelaar scored his seventh goal for Genk, in a 2–1 win against Anderlecht in the last 16 of Beker Van Belgie. This was followed up by scoring in a 2–1 win against R.E. Mouscron. On 12 March 2005, he scored his ninth goal of the season, as well as, setting one of the goals for the club, in a 3–1 win against Club Brugge. Engelaar then scored two goals in two matches between 13 April 2005 and 16 April 2005 against Germinal Beerschot and Beveren. His contributions for the club saw them finish third place in the league. Despite being sidelined on three occasions later in the 2004–05 season due to injuries and suspension, Engelaar went on to make thirty–one appearances and scoring eleven times in all competitions.

Ahead of the 2005–06 season, Engelaar was linked with a move back to Netherlands, with his former club Feyernood. Despite the transfer move, he started in the first four matches of the season, starting in the midfield position. However, Engelaar sustained a knee injury that kept him out for almost two months after going under a knife operation. He made his return from injury, coming on as a 63rd-minute substitute, in a 1–0 loss against Standard Liège on 16 October 2005. Following his return from injury, Engelaar continued to regain his first team place, playing in the midfield position, under the management of Hugo Broos despite their differences. He then scored two goals in two matches between 5 November 2005 and 20 November 2005 against K.S.V. Roeselare and Lierse. On 12 March 2006, Engelaar scored his third goal of the season, in a 1–0 win against Germinal Beerschot. Despite missing two more matches later in the 2005–06 season, he went on to make twenty–nine appearances and scoring three times in all competitions.

In the summer transfer window of 2006, Genk informed Engelaar that he can leave the club, due to being unhappy with his performance from the previous season. Amid to his departure from Genk, Engelaar made four appearances for the club, all of them were from the substitute bench. In total of his Genk career, he made sixty–four appearances and scoring twelve goals for the club. While at Genk, Engelaar even considered taking up a Belgium citizenship, as he believed that nothing can stop him taking up Belgian citizenship. However, this never happened. Engelaar spoke about his time in Belgium, saying: "The Belgian competition is not fun at all. Negative football, few people in the stands. In Belgium, a large group of clubs cannot play football at all. Players were given the only assignment to, for example, play me out of the game and then dug in. I have been terribly annoyed by it for months. Often I thought: what a shit match is this. Although I don't want to say that it made me worse. Because of the defensive and physical way of playing football, I have definitely become a better and more complete player. The team was doing badly and I was the victim. I could still train so well, but I didn't play. I had a few clashes with Broos because I dared to express my opinion. That has become fatal to me." He continued to spoke out his time in Belgium once again, saying: "'I am very happy that I have left Belgium. The level was way too low, you only played six fun matches a year. Also that demolition football against the lesser teams did not suit me." In spite of this, Engelaar said: "I got stronger there. I had to work hard and fight. That was also due to the way of playing in Belgium. I had to deal with opponents who did nothing at all and had only been ordered by their trainer to stop me. You have to come up with solutions for that."

=== FC Twente ===
After two seasons in Belgium, Engelaar moved back to Netherlands, where he joined Twente on 31 August 2006.

He made his debut for the club, coming on as a second half substitute for Wout Brama, in a 2–2 draw against Roda JC on 8 September 2006. Since joining FC Twente, Engelaar quickly became a first team regular, playing in the midfield position. He scored his first goal for the club, in a 4–3 win over RKC Waalwijk on 30 September 2006. Engelaar then scored two more goals by the end of the year, coming against Excelsior and Ajax. His fourth goal for FC Twente came on 20 January 2007, in a 2–1 win against RKC Waalwijk. In his first season that saw FC Twente qualify for the UEFA Cup next season, he went on to make thirty appearances and scoring four times in all competitions. For his performance, Engelaar was nominated Team of the Year by Voetbal International.

Ahead of the 2007–08 season, Engelaar was linked with a move to PSV Eindhoven, Ajax and Feyenoord, but he ended up staying at FC Twente. As a result of staying at the club, he was appointed as a new captain, succeeding Sander Boschker. Since the start of the 2007–08 season, Engelaar continued to establish himself in the first team, playing in the midfield position. He scored his first goal of the season, in a 2–2 draw against Utrecht on 26 August 2007. His second goal of the season came on 27 September 2007, in a 2–1 loss against NEC Nijmegen in the second round of the KNVB Beker. A week later on 4 October 2007, Engelaar scored his third goal of the season in the return leg of the UEFA Cup first round against Getafe, as FC Twente were eliminated in the tournament through away goal despite winning 2–1. By the end of the year, he added two more goals, coming against Heracles and Sparta Rotterdam. Engelaar scored his sixth goal of the season, in a 2–2 draw against NEC Nijmegen on 11 January 2008. Throughout the January transfer window, he was linked a move away from FC Twente, as Ajax and Porto were interested in signing him. But Engelaar ended up staying at the club after Ajax backed out. However, he suffered a knee injury that saw him miss eight matches. While on the sidelines, Engelaar signed a contract extension with FC Twente, keeping him until 2011. On 30 March 2008, he made his return to the first team from injury, coming on as a 71st-minute substitute, in a 1–0 win against FC Utrecht. Engelaar played all four matches in the league's play–off for the UEFA Champions League spot and helped the club earn a place in the tournament after beating Ajax 2–1 on aggregate. At the end of the 2007–08 season, he went on to make thirty–three appearances and scoring six times in all competitions.

=== Schalke 04 ===
With the 2007–08 season coming to an end, Engelaar's future was being discussed, as FC Twente were looking at options should he leave the club. Ahead of the UEFA Euro 2008 tournament, Engelaar announced he is intends to join Bundesliga side Schalke 04 and would be reunited with his former manager Fred Rutten. Even his performance in the tournament led further interests from Premier League club, which newly appointed Steve McClaren wanted to keep the player. The move was agreed on 3 July 2008 and officially joined Schalke 04 on 15 July 2008. Upon joining the club, he was given a number thirty–seven shirt.

Engelaar made his debut for the club in a friendly match, coming on as a second half substitute, in a 1–0 win over Rangers on 19 July 2008. He made his official debut for FC Schalke 04 against FC 08 Homburg in the first round of the DFB–Pokal, starting a match and played 78 minutes before being substituted, in a 3–0 win to advance to the next round. However, Engelaar suffered a knee injury during a 1–0 win against Atlético Madrid in the first round of the UEFA Champions League third round despite playing the whole game. On 16 September 2008, he made his return to the starting line–up from injury in the first leg of the UEFA Cup first round against APOEL. Following this, Engelaar made seven starts in the next seven matches for the club. He then provided a goal for Kevin Kurányi, who also set up two goals during a 3–0 win against Karlsruher SC on 28 October 2008. In a follow–up match against Energie Cottbus, Engelaar received a straight red card in the 53rd minute for confronting a referee, in a 2–0 win; which his sending off was described as "unnecessary." Five days later on 6 November 2008, he scored his first goal for the club in match day two of the UEFA Cup group stage, in a 1–1 draw against Racing Santander. After serving a one match suspension, Engelaar returned to the starting line–up against Bayer Leverkusen on 15 November 2008, as Schalke 04 lost 3–1. However, he was sent–off for a second time for a second bookable offense, in a 1–1 draw against 1899 Hoffenheim on 14 December 2008. After serving a one match suspension and his own injury concern, Engelaar returned to the first team against Werder Bremen on 7 February 2009, coming on as a 60th-minute substitute, in a 1–1 draw. Throughout the 2008–09 season, his performance suffered indifferent form and was subjected of criticism by the German media and the club's supporters. He later responded to criticism, saying that kicker's claims of his performance was "unjustified" and later criticised Schalke 04 supporters for treating him badly. Despite this, Engelaar went on to make thirty–five appearances and scoring once in all competitions.

At the end of the 2008–09 season, it was expected from Schalke 04 that Engelaar would be leaving the club. He was linked with a move to Ajax, PSV Eindhoven and Panathinaikos. Since leaving Germany, Engelaar is named among the biggest flops as part of the 50-year history of the Bundesliga.

=== PSV Eindhoven ===
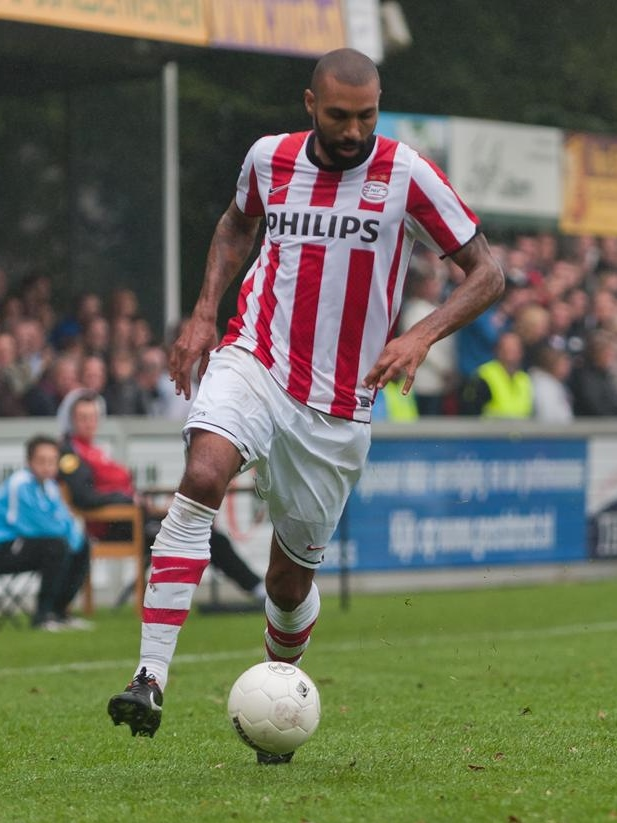
Engelaar playing for PSV in September 2011.

On 22 June 2009, Engelaar returned to Netherlands by joining PSV for undisclosed fee on a four-year deal. Upon being presented at the club, he cited returning to Netherlands to keep his international status alive, so his desire to play in the FIFA World Cup the following year. Engelaar was given a number eighteen shirt ahead of the new season.

He made his debut for the club, starting the whole game, in a 1–0 win against Cherno More in the first leg of the UEFA Europa League third round. In the return leg, Engelaar played 45 minutes before being substituted at half time, as PSV Eindhoven won 1–0 to advance to the next round. However, he suffered a knee injury during the match and was sidelined for weeks. On 23 August 2009, Engelaar returned to the first team from injury, coming on as a 57th-minute substitute, in a 3–1 win against NAC Breda. Four days later on 27 August 2009 against Bnei Yehuda Tel Aviv in the second leg of the UEFA Europa League play–off round, he came on as a second half substitute, and helped the club win 1–0 to qualify for the group stage. Following his return from injury, Engelaar became a first team regular for PSV Eindhoven, playing in the midfield position. He then provided four consecutive assists in four matches between 8 November 2009 and 3 December 2009 against ADO Den Haag, Heracles, Sparta Rotterdam and Sparta Prague. However, Engelaar suffered a left Achilles tendon injury and had a successful operation that saw him out for a month. After returning to training in late–January, he returned to the starting line–up against FC Utrecht on 3 February 2010 and scored his first goal for the club, in a 2–1 win. A month later on 6 March 2010, Engelaar scored his second goal for PSV Eindhoven, in a 2–1 loss against NAC Breda. Following his return from injury, he continued to regain his first team place for the rest of the 2009–10 season. Despite being sidelined on five occasions throughout the 2009–10 season, Engelaar went on to make thirty–nine appearances and scoring two times in all competitions.

Ahead of the 2010–11 season, Engelaar switched number shirt from eighteen to eight. In the opening game of the 2010–11 season, he scored PSV Eindhoven's third goal of the game in a late consolation, in a 3–1 win over SC Heerenveen. Engelaar then played in both legs of the UEFA Europa League play–off round against Sibir Novosibirsk and scored in the second leg, in a 5–0 win, which saw the club advance to the group stage. After missing one match due to a flu, he returned to the starting line–up against NEC Nijmegen on 11 September 2010 and set up one of the goals for PSV Eindhoven, in a 3–1 win. Since returning from injury, Engelaar continued to establish himself in the first team, playing in the midfield position. He then scored his third goal of the season, in a 2–1 win against Debreceni 2–1 on 21 October 2010. Three days later on 24 October 2010, Engelaar scored the club's seventh goal of the season, as PSV Eindhoven won 10–0 against his former club, Feyernood and giving them their heaviest defeat ever. Two weeks later on 10 November 2010, he scored his fifth goal of the season, in a 3–1 win against SV Spakenburg in the fourth round of the KNVB Beker. In a match against De Graafschap on 11 December 2010, Engelaar was sent–off for a second bookable offence, in a 0–0 draw. In the January transfer window, he was linked with a move to Turkish side Trabzonspor, but no avail. Following the departure of Ibrahim Afellay, Engelaar became Afellay's successor of being the captain for the remainder of the season. In the quarter final of KNVB Cup against Twente, he was at fault in match for giving away a penalty after being penalised for handball, resulting in the opposition team successfully converted to make it 1–1 and missed the penalty in the shootout, resulting in the club being eliminated from the tournament. However, Engelaar received a straight red card in the 55th minute for a foul on Luc Castaignos, in a 3–1 loss against Feyenoord on 24 April 2011. Shortly after, he had his red card overturned by the KNVB, saying: "And that must be the case when it comes to direct red. Engelaar also first plays the ball, after which the violation follows." Engelaar later helped PSV Eindhoven finish third place in the league by earning four points in the remaining two league matches of the 2010–11 season. Despite being sidelined with injuries and suspension throughout the 2010–11 season, he went on to make forty–six appearances and scoring five times in all competitions.

Ahead of the 2011–12 season, Engelaar said about his future: "Whether I will stay? That is a very difficult question, so shortly after the game. Whether or not staying the coach makes any difference to me? I don't know. I think he, like me, still has a contract until next year." As a result, he was linked with a move to Osasuna and Middlesbrough. However, both clubs ended interests in signing him, which Engelaar vowed to stay at the club. He later criticised PSV Eindhoven's management for their lack of experience and passion from last season and was expecting to leave the club but was unwilling to do so. Initially, Engelaar was given the captaincy but a change of heart from PSV Eindhoven's management led Ola Toivonen being appointed instead. He even rejected a chance to be appointed a vice–captain, which went to new signing Kevin Strootman. However, Engelaar found his first team opportunities limited, due to competitions, as well as, his own injury concern for the rest of the year. Despite this, Engelaar was praised by the club director for his commitment to the locker room and described it as "with sporty reluctantly." However, he returned to training from injury, only to injure his ankle once again that saw him out for two months. On 18 March 2012, Engelaar returned to the first team from injury, coming on as a 61st-minute substitute and scored his first goal of the season, in a 5–1 win over Heerenveen. He then came on as a 75th-minute substitute, in a 3–0 win against Heracles Almelo to win the KNVB Beker final on 8 April 2012. At the end of the 2011–12 season, Engelaar went on to make twenty–one appearances and scoring once in all competitions.

Ahead of the 2012–13 season, Engelaar said he wanted to leave PSV Eindhoven despite having a year to his contract left. Engelaar also switched number shirt from eight to sixteen. However, his first team opportunities was limited once again despite no longer feeling that he is serious risk of playing time. As a result, he found his playing time, coming from the UEFA Europa League and KNVB Beker matches. Engelaar then scored his first goal of the season, in a 6–1 win against ADO Den Haag. However in February, he was involved in the car accident, but escaped unhurt. Despite this, Engelaar went on to make eleven appearances and scoring once in all competitions at the end of the 2012–13 season. After four years at PSV Eindhoven, it announced that Engelaar will not have his contract renewed when it will expired at the end of the 2012–13 season. Following his release by the club, he was linked with a move to West Ham United and NAC Breda, having ruled out retirement.

=== Melbourne Heart ===
On 9 August 2013, Engelaar joined A-League club Melbourne Heart (now Melbourne City) from Dutch side PSV Eindhoven on a one–year contract.

On his preseason debut for the club, he suffered a fractured leg, which ruled him out for the first 14 rounds of the 2013–14 season. On 17 January 2014, Engelaar made his long awaited debut for Melbourne Heart, coming on as a 59th-minute substitute, in a 3–1 win against Newcastle Jets. Two weeks later on 31 January 2014, he received a red card for a second bookable offence in the first 33 minutes to the match, in a 2–1 win against Sydney. After serving a one match suspension, Engelaar returned to the starting line–up against Wellington Phoenix on 16 February 2014 and helped the club win 5–0. He then made a strong impact, helping the Melbourne Heart win its first game of the season and going on a 5-game unbeaten run. On 23 March 2014, Engelaar scored a goal from inside his own half against the Central Coast Mariners, as the club lost 2–1. For his performance, he was later named as A-League Team of the Week on 24 March 2014. In the last game of the season, Engelaar scored his fifth goal for Melbourne City, in a 3–2 loss against Western Sydney Wanderers. At the end of the 2013–14 season, he went on to make twelve appearances and scoring five times in all competitions.

For his performance, Engelaar's goal against Central Coast Mariners earned the 2013–14 Goal of the Year and was included in the 2013–14 Team of the Year by Goal.com. However, he was among four players to leave the club. After leaving the club, Engelaar was considering retirement from football.

=== Return to Twente ===
On 2 October 2014, Engelaar signed a one-year contract with Twente in his second spell, having spend weeks on trial.

He made his second debut for the club, coming on as a substitute for Kamohelo Mokotjo in the 88th minute, in a 1–1 draw against Ajax on 18 October 2014. However, Engelaar suffered a calf injury that saw him miss two matches. He made his return to the first team, coming on as a 76th-minute substitute, in a 2–2 draw against Vitesse on 7 December 2014. A month later on 18 January 2015, Engelaar scored his first goal for FC Twente – his first goal for the club in seven years – in a 3–1 loss against Feyenoord. However, he suffered a calf-injury while warming up ahead of the match against PEC Zwolle and was out for two months. But Engelaar made his return from injury in the last game of the season against Heerenveen and scored his second goal of the season, in a 3–1 win, in what turned out to be last his appearances in professional football. At the end of the 2015–16 season, he went on to make fourteen appearances and scoring two times in all competitions.

In the wake of the club's financial trouble, Engelaar was among seven players to be released. Following his release, Engelaar said he's going to discuss his future in the summer, having seriously considering retirement from professional football.

=== Retirement ===
On 13 September 2015, during a radio interview on NPO 1 Engelaar announced that he had retired from professional football. Engelaar decided to start a new career as an entrepreneur in the company SeiSei in which he is one of the two partners. The company is specialised in talent management and its mission is to help talent (within the sports and entertainment) realise their dreams. SeiSei has a roster with several signings. Orlando will not disappear from football at all, since one of the company's subsidiary companies SeiSei Football Mgmt will focus on football management.

== International career ==
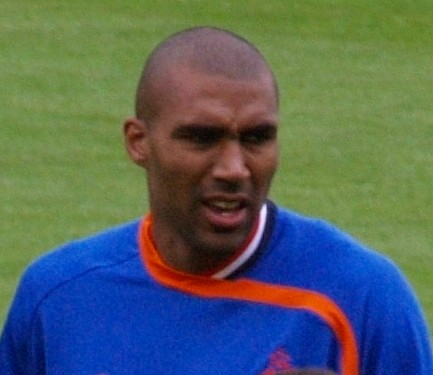
Engelaar training with Netherlands squad prior to the UEFA Euro tournament.

Engelaar was eligible to play for Suriname, as his father was born in the country and once played as a centre-back for the national team. Engelaar declared his participation for Netherlands, having ruled out to play for Belgium and said he's capable for the Oranje. Manager Marco van Basten mentioned Engelaar and hinted that he could be in the squad. On 28 May 2007, Engelaar was called up to the Netherlands squad for the first time. He made his international debut for the Oranje in a friendly against South Korea on 2 June 2007. He later made two appearances for Netherlands later in the year, both coming on as a substitute against Thailand and Belarus.

In March 2008, Engelaar said in an interview that he determined to make it to the Netherlands squad for the UEFA Euro squad. Two months later, Engelaar was included in the Oranje's provisional squad. He made his first start for Netherlands against Ukraine on 24 May 2008 and started the whole game, as they won 3–0. Engelaar made two more starts for Oranje against Denmark and Wales. His performance prior to the tournament convinced coach Marco van Basten to include the player in the 23 men squad. He played the full match in the Netherlands' 3–0 victory over Italy in their Group C match. After the match, manager Van Basten praised Engelaar's performance, saying: "He played an excellent role in his controlling role. Engelaar was calm on the ball, controlled the game well on the right and left and was well positioned for falling balls." He made another start for Oranje's second group match of the tournament, playing the first half before being substituted, in a 4–1 win over France three days later on 14 June 2008. Engelaar made his third start for Oranje in the third group stage match and played the full 90 minutes, as Netherlands won 2–0 against Romania. With Netherland expected to be the favourite to win the UEFA Euro, the Oranje, however, lost 3–1 in quarter-final match against Russia, in which he made his fourth start of the tournament and was substituted for Ibrahim Afellay in the 61st minute.

Following the conclusion of the UEFA Euro 2008, Engelaar didn't receive another call–up from Netherlands until on 19 November 2008 against Sweden when he came on as a 75th-minute substitute, in a 3–1 win. On 23 September 2009, Engelaar was called–up to the Oranje squad for the first time in ten months. He made his first appearance for Netherlands in almost a year, coming on as a 70th-minute substitute, in a 0–0 draw against Australia on 10 October 2009. A month later on 18 November 2009, Engelaar made another appearance for Oranje, coming on as a second half substitute, in a 0–0 draw against Paraguay. On 15 May 2010, he was included in the preliminary squad for the 2010 FIFA World Cup in South Africa. Engelaar made his last appearances for Netherlands against Mexico on 26 May 2010, coming on as a second half substitute, in a 2–1 win. However, on 27 May 2010, Netherlands manager Bert van Marwijk announced that he would not be part of the final squad of 23 participating in the competition. In an interview with NuSport, Engelaar said: "I don't remember half of it, sat there numb. When I heard that I had to go for an interview, I already knew. The national coach said that he has chosen Stijn Schaars but that I was close, I believe. Well, that is of no use to you. I'm quite through it. That was a very important reason, yes. At the moment I have the feeling that everything was in vain. You are working towards something, but you are not achieving your goal. Game over. Two years ago I noticed how wonderful it is to experience such a final tournament. That makes this extra painful." Manager van Marwijk said leaving out Engelaar in favour of Schaars was the hardest decision he has done. Following this, he was never called up for the Oranje team again.

== Honours ==
Melbourne Heart

- A-League Goal of the Year 2014
