= UEFA Euro 2008 Group C =

Football tournament group stage

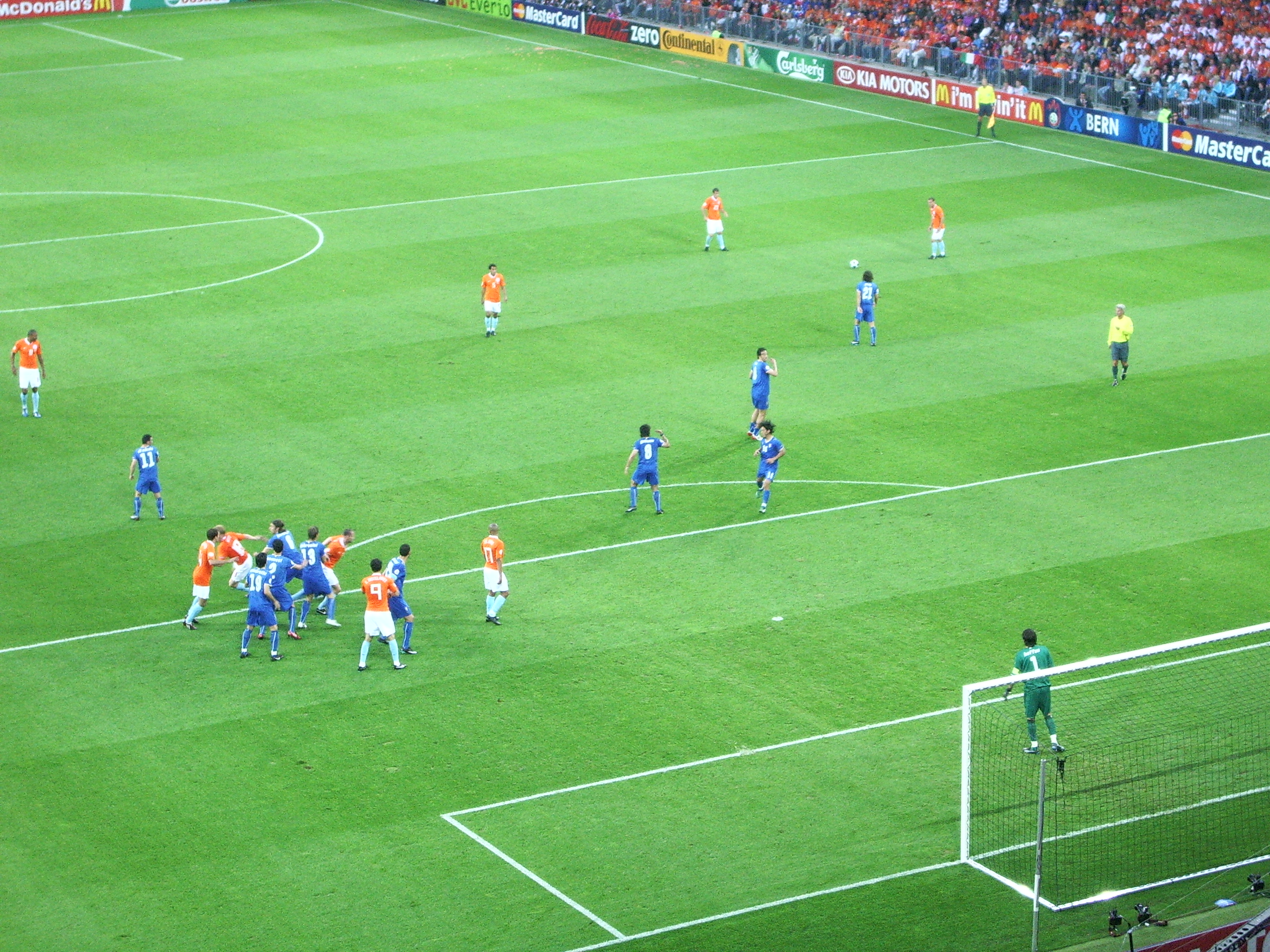
A free kick in the match between Netherlands and Italy on 9 June

Group C of UEFA Euro 2008 was played from 9 to 17 June 2008. All six group matches were played at venues in Switzerland, in Zürich and Bern. The group was composed of 2006 FIFA World Cup finalists Italy and France, as well as the Netherlands and Romania. At the time of the draw, these countries' respective Elo rankings among European teams were 1st, 2nd, 4th and 8th, and as such the group had been dubbed the competition's "group of death".

The Netherlands became the first team from Group C to qualify for the quarter-finals. In their first match, they beat the world champions Italy 3–0, in a display of counter-attacking football. Then, in their second game, they also beat the 2006 World Cup runners-up, France, by a 4–1 scoreline. This left the French in a difficult position, having already played out a scoreless draw against Romania in the group's opening match. Romania also played out a draw against Italy in their second match, leaving them in second place going into the final round of group matches.

Italy finished as the second quarter-finalists, after they beat France 2–0 in their final game. French defender Eric Abidal was sent off just over a quarter of the way through the game for a foul on Luca Toni in the area; Andrea Pirlo converted the resulting penalty. Daniele De Rossi added the second goal from a deflected free kick just after the hour mark. Because of the Italian win, Romania had to beat the Netherlands to qualify for the next round, but they were undone by a Klaas-Jan Huntelaar goal just after half-time, before Robin van Persie scored his second of the tournament three minutes from the end.

Despite the perceived strength of its teams, Group C was the only group at Euro 2008 from which no side made it past the quarter-finals; Italy went out in a penalty shoot-out to eventual winners Spain and the Netherlands lost against Russia after extra time.

== Teams ==
Draw position	Team	Pot	Method of qualification	Date of qualification	Finals appearance	Last appearance	Previous best performance	UEFA Rankings		FIFA Rankings June 2008
Draw position	Team	Pot	Method of qualification	Date of qualification	Finals appearance	Last appearance	Previous best performance	November 2007 (Note: The UEFA rankings of November 2007 were used for seeding for the final draw.)	May 2008 (Note: UEFA unveiled a new ranking system in May 2008 based on results up to November 2007.)	FIFA Rankings June 2008
C1	Netherlands	1	Group G runner-up	17 November 2007	8th	2004	Winners (1988)	1	6	10
C2	Italy	2	Group B winner	17 November 2007	7th	2004	Winners (1968)	3	1	3
C3	Romania	3	Group G winner	17 October 2007	4th	2000	Quarter-finals (2000)	6	12	12
C4	France	4	Group B runner-up	17 November 2007	7th	2004	Winners (1984, 2000)	13	2	7

== Standings ==
Pos	Team	Pld	W	D	L	GF	GA	GD	Pts	Qualification
1	Netherlands	3	3	0	0	9	1	+8	9	Advance to knockout stage
2	Italy	3	1	1	1	3	4	−1	4	Advance to knockout stage
3	Romania	3	0	2	1	1	3	−2	2	
4	France	3	0	1	2	1	6	−5	1	

Source: UEFA
Rules for classification: Group stage tiebreakers

In the quarter-finals,

- The winner of Group C, Netherlands, advanced to play the runner-up of Group D, Russia.
- The runner-up of Group C, Italy, advanced to play the winner of Group D, Spain.

== Matches ==
=== Romania vs France ===
9 June 2008
18:00

Romania	0–0	France
	Report

Letzigrund, Zürich
Attendance: 30,585
Referee: Manuel Mejuto González (Spain)

Romania	France

GK	1	Bogdan Lobonț
RB	2	Cosmin Contra	(yellow card) 40'
CB	4	Gabriel Tamaș
CB	15	Dorin Goian	(yellow card) 43'
LB	3	Răzvan Raț
RM	11	Răzvan Cociș		(substituted off) 64'
CM	6	Mirel Rădoi		(substituted off) 90+3'
LM	5	Cristian Chivu (c)
RF	16	Bănel Nicoliță
CF	21	Daniel Niculae	(yellow card) 27'
LF	10	Adrian Mutu		(substituted off) 78'
Substitutions:
MF	8	Paul Codrea		(substituted on) 64'
FW	18	Marius Niculae		(substituted on) 78'
MF	20	Nicolae Dică		(substituted on) 90+3'
Manager:
Victor Pițurcă

GK	23	Grégory Coupet
RB	19	Willy Sagnol	(yellow card) 51'
CB	15	Lilian Thuram (c)
CB	5	William Gallas
LB	3	Eric Abidal
CM	20	Jérémy Toulalan
CM	6	Claude Makélélé
RW	22	Franck Ribéry
LW	7	Florent Malouda
CF	8	Nicolas Anelka		(substituted off) 72'
CF	9	Karim Benzema		(substituted off) 78'
Substitutions:
FW	18	Bafétimbi Gomis		(substituted on) 72'
MF	11	Samir Nasri		(substituted on) 78'
Manager:
Raymond Domenech

Man of the Match:
Claude Makélélé (France)

Assistant referees:
Juan Carlos Yuste Jiménez (Spain)
Jesús Calvo Guadamuro (Spain)
Fourth official:
Olegário Benquerença (Portugal)
Reserve assistant referee:
Darren Cann (England)

=== Netherlands vs Italy ===
9 June 2008
20:45

Netherlands	3–0	Italy
Van Nistelrooy 26'; Sneijder 31'; Van Bronckhorst 79'	Report

Stade de Suisse, Bern
Attendance: 30,777
Referee: Peter Fröjdfeldt (Sweden)

Netherlands	Italy

GK	1	Edwin van der Sar (c)
RB	2	André Ooijer
CB	21	Khalid Boulahrouz		(substituted off) 77'
CB	4	Joris Mathijsen
LB	5	Giovanni van Bronckhorst
CM	17	Nigel de Jong	(yellow card) 58'
CM	8	Orlando Engelaar
RW	18	Dirk Kuyt		(substituted off) 81'
AM	23	Rafael van der Vaart
LW	10	Wesley Sneijder
CF	9	Ruud van Nistelrooy		(substituted off) 70'
Substitutions:
FW	7	Robin van Persie		(substituted on) 70'
DF	3	John Heitinga		(substituted on) 77'
MF	20	Ibrahim Afellay		(substituted on) 81'
Manager:
Marco van Basten

GK	1	Gianluigi Buffon (c)
RB	2	Christian Panucci
CB	6	Andrea Barzagli
CB	23	Marco Materazzi		(substituted off) 54'
LB	19	Gianluca Zambrotta	(yellow card) 35'
CM	13	Massimo Ambrosini
CM	21	Andrea Pirlo
CM	8	Gennaro Gattuso	(yellow card) 51'
RW	16	Mauro Camoranesi		(substituted off) 75'
LW	11	Antonio Di Natale		(substituted off) 64'
CF	9	Luca Toni	(yellow card) 27'
Substitutions:
DF	3	Fabio Grosso		(substituted on) 54'
FW	7	Alessandro Del Piero		(substituted on) 64'
FW	18	Antonio Cassano		(substituted on) 75'
Manager:
Roberto Donadoni

Man of the Match:
Wesley Sneijder (Netherlands)

Assistant referees:
Stefan Wittberg (Sweden)
Henrik Andrén (Sweden)
Fourth official:
Damir Skomina (Slovenia)
Reserve assistant referee:
Mike Mullarkey (England)

=== Italy vs Romania ===
13 June 2008
18:00

Italy	1–1	Romania
Panucci 56'	Report	Mutu 55'

Letzigrund, Zürich
Attendance: 30,585
Referee: Tom Henning Øvrebø (Norway)

Italy	Romania

GK	1	Gianluigi Buffon
RB	19	Gianluca Zambrotta
CB	2	Christian Panucci
CB	4	Giorgio Chiellini
LB	3	Fabio Grosso
CM	21	Andrea Pirlo	(yellow card) 61'
CM	10	Daniele De Rossi	(yellow card) 90+2'
RW	16	Mauro Camoranesi		(substituted off) 85'
AM	20	Simone Perrotta		(substituted off) 57'
LW	7	Alessandro Del Piero (c)		(substituted off) 77'
CF	9	Luca Toni
Substitutions:
FW	18	Antonio Cassano		(substituted on) 57'
FW	15	Fabio Quagliarella		(substituted on) 77'
MF	13	Massimo Ambrosini		(substituted on) 85'
Manager:
Roberto Donadoni

GK	1	Bogdan Lobonț
RB	2	Cosmin Contra
CB	4	Gabriel Tamaș
CB	15	Dorin Goian	(yellow card) 73'
LB	3	Răzvan Raț
DM	6	Mirel Rădoi		(substituted off) 25'
RM	7	Florentin Petre		(substituted off) 60'
CM	8	Paul Codrea
LM	5	Cristian Chivu (c)	(yellow card) 58'
SS	10	Adrian Mutu	(yellow card) 43'	(substituted off) 88'
CF	21	Daniel Niculae
Substitutions:
MF	20	Nicolae Dică		(substituted on) 25'
MF	16	Bănel Nicoliță		(substituted on) 60'
MF	11	Răzvan Cociș		(substituted on) 88'
Manager:
Victor Pițurcă

Man of the Match:
Andrea Pirlo (Italy)

Assistant referees:
Geir Åge Holen (Norway)
Jan Petter Randen (Norway)
Fourth official:
Ivan Bebek (Croatia)
Reserve assistant referee:
Jesús Calvo Guadamuro (Spain)

=== Netherlands vs France ===
13 June 2008
20:45

Netherlands	4–1	France
Kuyt 9'; Van Persie 59'; Robben 72'; Sneijder 90+2'	Report	Henry 71'

Stade de Suisse, Bern
Attendance: 30,777
Referee: Herbert Fandel (Germany)

Netherlands	France

GK	1	Edwin van der Sar (c)
RB	21	Khalid Boulahrouz
CB	2	André Ooijer	(yellow card) 51'
CB	4	Joris Mathijsen
LB	5	Giovanni van Bronckhorst
CM	17	Nigel de Jong
CM	8	Orlando Engelaar		(substituted off) 46'
RW	18	Dirk Kuyt		(substituted off) 55'
AM	23	Rafael van der Vaart		(substituted off) 78'
LW	10	Wesley Sneijder
CF	9	Ruud van Nistelrooy
Substitutions:
MF	11	Arjen Robben		(substituted on) 46'
FW	7	Robin van Persie		(substituted on) 55'
DF	14	Wilfred Bouma		(substituted on) 78'
Manager:
Marco van Basten

GK	23	Grégory Coupet
RB	19	Willy Sagnol
CB	15	Lilian Thuram (c)
CB	5	William Gallas
LB	13	Patrice Evra
CM	20	Jérémy Toulalan	(yellow card) 82'
CM	6	Claude Makélélé	(yellow card) 32'
RW	10	Sidney Govou		(substituted off) 75'
LW	7	Florent Malouda		(substituted off) 60'
SS	22	Franck Ribéry
CF	12	Thierry Henry
Substitutions:
FW	18	Bafétimbi Gomis		(substituted on) 60'
FW	8	Nicolas Anelka		(substituted on) 75'
Manager:
Raymond Domenech

Man of the Match:
Wesley Sneijder (Netherlands)

Assistant referees:
Carsten Kadach (Germany)
Volker Wezel (Germany)
Fourth official:
Grzegorz Gilewski (Poland)
Reserve assistant referee:
Juan Carlos Yuste Jiménez (Spain)

=== Netherlands vs Romania ===
17 June 2008
20:45

Netherlands	2–0	Romania
Huntelaar 54'; Van Persie 87'	Report

Stade de Suisse, Bern
Attendance: 30,777
Referee: Massimo Busacca (Switzerland)

Netherlands	Romania

GK	16	Maarten Stekelenburg
RB	21	Khalid Boulahrouz	(substituted off) 58'
CB	3	John Heitinga (c)
CB	14	Wilfred Bouma
LB	15	Tim de Cler
CM	6	Demy de Zeeuw
CM	8	Orlando Engelaar
RW	20	Ibrahim Afellay
AM	7	Robin van Persie
LW	11	Arjen Robben	(substituted off) 61'
CF	19	Klaas-Jan Huntelaar	(substituted off) 83'
Substitutions:
DF	12	Mario Melchiot	(substituted on) 58'
FW	18	Dirk Kuyt	(substituted on) 61'
FW	22	Jan Vennegoor of Hesselink	(substituted on) 83'
Manager:
Marco van Basten

GK	1	Bogdan Lobonț
RB	2	Cosmin Contra
CB	4	Gabriel Tamaș
CB	14	Sorin Ghionea
LB	3	Răzvan Raț
DM	8	Paul Codrea		(substituted off) 72'
CM	11	Răzvan Cociș
CM	5	Cristian Chivu (c)	(yellow card) 78'
RW	16	Bănel Nicoliță		(substituted off) 82'
LW	10	Adrian Mutu
CF	18	Marius Niculae		(substituted off) 59'
Substitutions:
FW	21	Daniel Niculae		(substituted on) 59'
MF	20	Nicolae Dică		(substituted on) 72'
MF	7	Florentin Petre		(substituted on) 82'
Manager:
Victor Pițurcă

Man of the Match:
Robin van Persie (Netherlands)

Assistant referees:
Matthias Arnet (Switzerland)
Stéphane Cuhat (Switzerland)
Fourth official:
Craig Thomson (Scotland)
Reserve assistant referee:
Stefan Wittberg (Sweden)

=== France vs Italy ===
17 June 2008
20:45

France	0–2	Italy
	Report	Pirlo 25' (pen.); De Rossi 62'

Letzigrund, Zürich
Attendance: 30,585
Referee: Ľuboš Micheľ (Slovakia)

France	Italy

GK	23	Grégory Coupet
RB	14	François Clerc
CB	5	William Gallas
CB	3	Eric Abidal	(red card) 24'
LB	13	Patrice Evra	(yellow card) 18'
CM	20	Jérémy Toulalan
CM	6	Claude Makélélé
RW	10	Sidney Govou	(yellow card) 47'	(substituted off) 66'
LW	22	Franck Ribéry		(substituted off) 10'
CF	9	Karim Benzema
CF	12	Thierry Henry (c)	(yellow card) 85'
Substitutions:
MF	11	Samir Nasri		(substituted on) 10'	(substituted off) 26'
DF	2	Jean-Alain Boumsong	(yellow card) 72'		(substituted on) 26'
FW	8	Nicolas Anelka		(substituted on) 66'
Manager:
Raymond Domenech

GK	1	Gianluigi Buffon (c)
RB	19	Gianluca Zambrotta
CB	2	Christian Panucci
CB	4	Giorgio Chiellini	(yellow card) 45+4'
LB	3	Fabio Grosso
CM	21	Andrea Pirlo	(yellow card) 44'	(substituted off) 55'
CM	10	Daniele De Rossi
CM	8	Gennaro Gattuso	(yellow card) 54'	(substituted off) 82'
AM	20	Simone Perrotta		(substituted off) 64'
CF	9	Luca Toni
CF	18	Antonio Cassano
Substitutions:
MF	13	Massimo Ambrosini		(substituted on) 55'
MF	16	Mauro Camoranesi		(substituted on) 64'
MF	22	Alberto Aquilani		(substituted on) 82'
Manager:
Roberto Donadoni

Man of the Match:
Daniele De Rossi (Italy)

Assistant referees:
Roman Slyško (Slovakia)
Martin Balko (Slovakia)
Fourth official:
Viktor Kassai (Hungary)
Reserve assistant referee:
Henrik Andrén (Sweden)

== See also ==
- France at the UEFA European Championship
- Italy at the UEFA European Championship
- Netherlands at the UEFA European Championship
- Romania at the UEFA European Championship
