= John Lauridsen =

Danish footballer (born 1959)

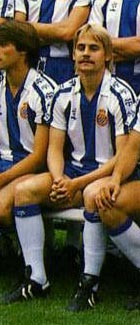
- Lauridsen lining-up for Español

Personal information
- Full name: John Mikkelsen Lauridsen
- Date of birth: 2 April 1959 (age 67)
- Place of birth: Ribe, Denmark
- Height: 1.74 m (5 ft 9 in)
- Position: Midfielder

Youth career
- Gredstedbro
- Vejle

Senior career*
Years	Team	Apps	(Gls)
1978–1982	Esbjerg	76	(11)
1982–1988	Español	214	(26)
1988–1990	Málaga	58	(3)
1990–1992	Esbjerg	70	(16)
Total		418	(56)

International career
1981–1988	Denmark	27	(3)
- * Club domestic league appearances and goals

John Mikkelsen Lauridsen (born 2 April 1959) is a Danish retired professional footballer who played as an attacking midfielder, gifted with field vision and able to shoot with both feet.

He won the Danish championship with Esbjerg, before playing eight years uninterrupted in La Liga, with Español and Málaga. He appeared in more than 250 official games for the former club, helping it reach the 1988 UEFA Cup final.

Lauridsen played 27 times for Denmark after making his debut in 1981, representing the nation at the Euro 1984.

== Football career ==
Born in Ribe, Jutland, Lauridsen played his youth football in Gredstedbro and Vejle Boldklub, before he made his senior debut in the Danish 1st Division with Esbjerg fB in 1978. He played 16 matches the following season, as the club won the league.

Lauridsen made his Danish national team debut on 12 August 1981, in a 2–1 friendly win in Finland in which he scored the equalizer at the 27th minute (the first of his three international goals). Also that summer, he was supposed to travel to England to sign for Ipswich Town, but the ferry did not make the journey due to bad weather conditions, and the deal fell through. Shortly after, football agent Fernand Goyvaerts phoned the player with an offer from Spain's RCD Español, which he accepted, joining the Catalans in early 1982 and becoming a full-time professional.

The first half-season notwithstanding, Lauridsen never featured in less than 30 matches for Español – known as Espanyol from 1995. He contributed with a career-high 41 appearances in the 1986–87 campaign as his team finished in a best-ever third in La Liga, and also helped it reach the final of the following year's UEFA Cup – eight games, 304 minutes, two goals – which ended in a penalty shootout defeat against Bayer 04 Leverkusen; he played in more than 250 competitive matches for the club during his seven-year spell, as one of only two foreign players – the other being Cameroon's Thomas N'Kono.

While at Espanyol, Lauridsen was included in the Danish squad for the UEFA Euro 1984, where he took part in two games, scoring a goal in the 5–0 group stage win against Yugoslavia. His international career brought him only 27 caps in seven years, as he was often overlooked behind the likes of Frank Arnesen, Søren Lerby, Jan Mølby and Jesper Olsen. He played his last international on 27 April 1988, in a friendly with Austria.

Lauridsen stayed in Spain after his 1988 exit from Espanyol, playing two years with CD Málaga also in the top flight. He ended his career as an amateur player with Esbjerg, helping it promote into the second tier. His last match took place on 19 November 1992 at the age of 33, a 4–1 win against Vejle Boldklub where he had played as a youth.

After his footballing career ended, Lauridsen settled in Bramming. In the following years, he occasionally appeared in games for Espanyol's veterans.

== Honours ==
- Danish 1st Division: 1979
- UEFA Cup: Runner-up 1987–88
