= Ole Qvist =

Danish footballer

Personal information
- Date of birth: 25 February 1950 (age 76)
- Place of birth: Copenhagen, Denmark
- Height: 1.84 m (6 ft 0 in)
- Position: Goalkeeper

Senior career*
Years	Team	Apps	(Gls)
1973–1987	KB	290	(0)

International career
1979–1986	Denmark	39	(0)
- * Club domestic league appearances and goals

Ole Qvist (born 25 February 1950) is a Danish former professional footballer who played a goalkeeper for Kjøbenhavns Boldklub and earned 39 caps with the Denmark national team from 1979 to 1986. He played all of Denmark's four matches at the 1984 European Championships. He was also an unused player at the 1986 FIFA World Cup team.

Throughout his playing career he continued to work as a police officer in the Traffic Divisions motorcycle unit.

His son Lasse Qvist is also a footballer. His father Hans Qvist was a renowned Danish cartoonist.
