= Heinz Fahnler =

Austrian football referee (1942–2008)

- Born: 10 August 1942; Vienna, Nazi Germany
- Died: 17 September 2008 (aged 66); Madrid, Spain

Domestic
Years	League	Role
1976–1985	Austrian Football Bundesliga	Referee

International
Years	League	Role
1978–1985	FIFA listed	Referee

Heinz Fahnler (10 August 1942 – 17 September 2008) was an Austrian football referee.

== Refereeing career ==
Fahnler passed his referee exam in 1962, and in 1976 he became a referee in the Austrian Football Bundesliga. Two years later, Fahnler was appointed as a FIFA referee.

In 1984, Fahnler was selected as a referee for UEFA Euro 1984, where he officiated a group stage match between Portugal and Romania.

Fahnler served as a UEFA delegate from 1990 until 2008, when he suffered a heart attack and died in Madrid before his role as a delegate for the UEFA Champions League match between Real Madrid and BATE Borisov.
