= Jean-François Domergue =

French footballer and manager (born 1957)

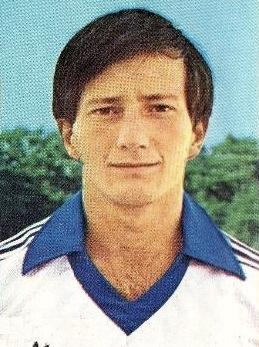
- Domergue in 1979

Personal information
- Date of birth: 23 June 1957 (age 69)
- Place of birth: Bordeaux, France
- Height: 1.78 m (5 ft 10 in)
- Position: Defender

Youth career
- 1969–1975: Bordeaux

Senior career*
Years	Team	Apps	(Gls)
1975–1980	Bordeaux	107	(10)
1980–1982	Lille	74	(8)
1982–1983	Lyon	38	(8)
1983–1986	Toulouse	112	(17)
1986–1988	Marseille	73	(6)
1988–1989	Caen	41	(6)
Total		445	(55)

International career
1984–1987	France	9	(2)

Managerial career
- 2000–2004: Le Havre
- 2004–2007: Montpellier
Medal record
Representing France
UEFA European Championship
Winner	1984 France
CONMEBOL–UEFA Cup of Champions
Winner	1985 France
- * Club domestic league appearances and goals

Jean-François Domergue (born 23 June 1957) is a French former football player and manager who played as a defender.

Over his career he had nine caps for the France national team, for whom he scored two goals, which were quite memorable as both occurred in the semi-finals of the 1984 European Football Championship against Portugal, which France won 3–2 after extra time. France went on to win the tournament. He has served as a manager of Le Havre and Montpellier.

== Honours ==
=== Player ===
France

- UEFA European Championship: 1984
- Artemio Franchi Cup: 1985
