= Klaus Berggreen =

Danish footballer (born 1958)

Personal information
- Full name: Klaus Berggreen
- Date of birth: 3 February 1958 (age 68)
- Place of birth: Kongens Lyngby, Denmark
- Height: 1.82 m (6 ft 0 in)
- Position: Midfielder

Youth career
- 1964–1975: Lyngby Boldklub

Senior career*
Years	Team	Apps	(Gls)
1975–1982	Lyngby Boldklub	?	(?)
1982–1986	Pisa	124	(29)
1986–1987	Roma	24	(5)
1987–1988	Torino	26	(3)
1989–1990	Lyngby Boldklub	21	(4)

International career
1978–1979	Denmark U-21	7	(1)
1979–1988	Denmark	46	(5)
- * Club domestic league appearances and goals

Klaus Berggreen (born 3 February 1958) is a Danish former footballer who played as a midfielder, most prominently for Italian clubs Pisa and A.S. Roma. He played 46 matches and scored five goals for the Danish national team, and he represented his country at the 1986 World Cup and two European Championship tournaments.

== Career ==
Born in Kongens Lyngby, Berggreen started playing football at local club Lyngby Boldklub at the age of six. He made his senior debut in 1975, in a Lyngby team which struggled to establish itself in the Danish 2nd Division. Berggreen was Lyngby's top goalscorer for several seasons, and scored 15 goals when the club won promotion to the Danish 1st Division in 1979. He made his international debut for Denmark in August 1979, in the first game of the newly appointed national manager Sepp Piontek. He played one more game for his country, before his international career went on a hiatus.

In 1982, he moved abroad to play for newly promoted club SC Pisa in the Italian Serie A. Berggreen helped the club stay in Serie A, and was recalled to the Danish national team in October 1982. In the 1983–84 Serie A season, Pisa were relegated to Serie B, but Berggreen chose to stay with the club. He was selected to compete for the Danish national team at the 1984 European Championship, where he played four matches, and scored a goal in the 5–0 victory against Yugoslavia. In the semi-final against Spain, Berggreen was sent off in extra time, and Denmark were later eliminated following penalty shootout.

The following season, he helped Pisa win the 1984–85 Serie B title, and obtain promotion to Serie A once again. Pisa were relegated once more at the end of the 1985–86 Serie A season. With the Danish national team, Berggreen played an important part in Denmark's first ever qualification for a World Cup tournament. In the penultimate match of the qualification stage in October 1985, Denmark were trailing against Norway by 0–1 at half-time. Ten minutes after the break, Berggreen snapped the ball from a Norwegian defender, and made the assist for Michael Laudrup to tie the game. Berggreen himself went on to score two goals, as Denmark eventually won 5–1. He was included in the Danish squad for the 1986 World Cup, and played three games, before Denmark were once again eliminated by Spain.

After the World Cup, Berggreen opted to stay in the Serie A, and signed with vice-champions A.S. Roma. He played a single season at Roma, which ended in a seventh-place finish in Serie A. He then moved on to league rivals Torino, whom he helped to finish in sixth place the following season. He was selected to represent Denmark at the 1988 European Championship in June 1988, where he played two games as a substitute. Berggreen ended his national career after the tournament, having played 46 matches and scored five goals since his international debut in 1979.

Berggreen moved back to Denmark, where he ended his career with Lyngby, in a combined role as both active player and Lyngby sports director. He ended his active career in March 1990, at the age of 32 years, after more than 200 games for Lyngby. Lyngby struggled financially, and Berggreen left his job as a sports director in November 1992. He went on to concentrate on his clothing company.

== Honours ==
Pisa

- Serie B: 1984–85
- Mitropa Cup: 1986
