= Søren Lerby =

Danish footballer (born 1958)

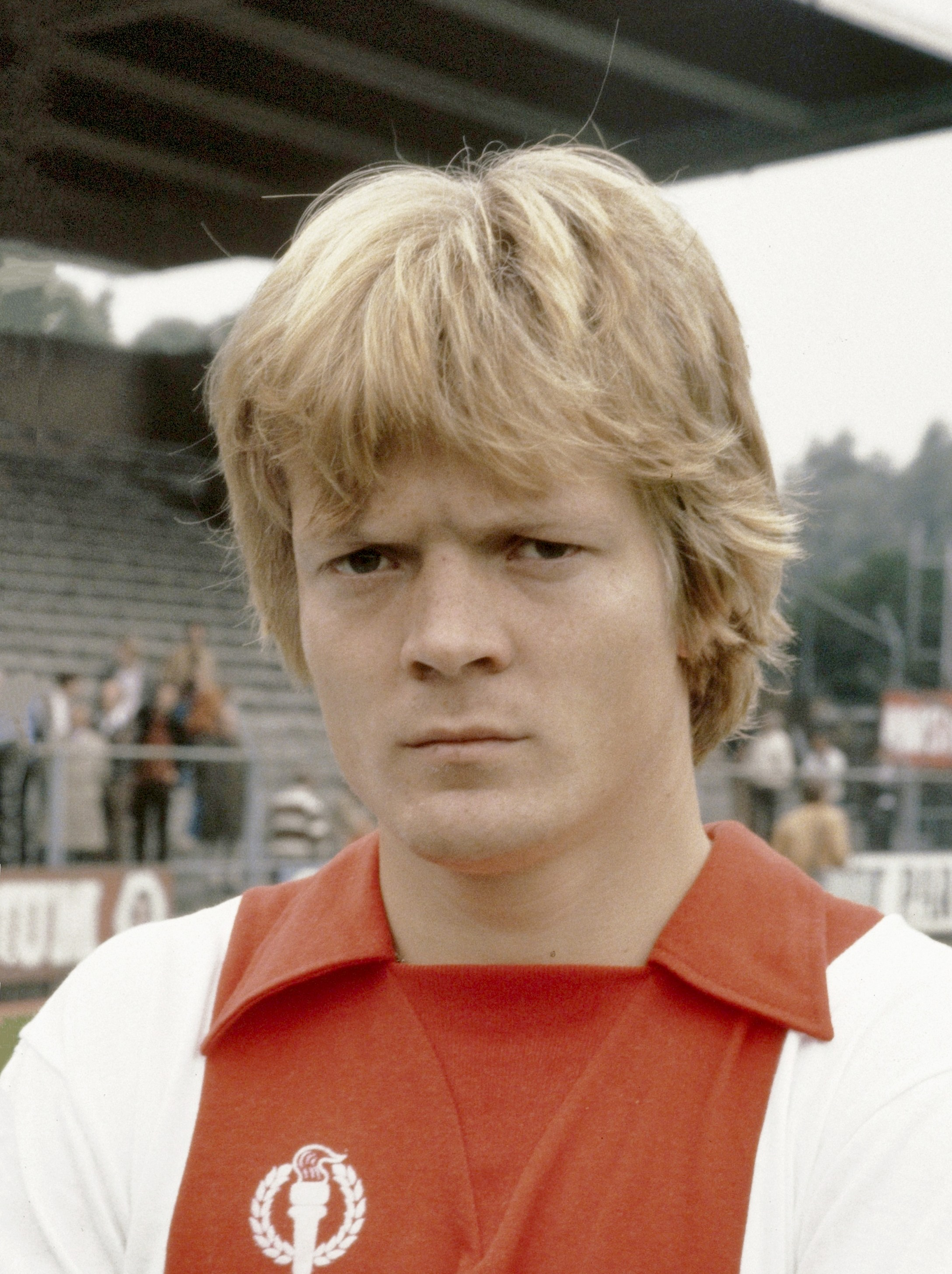
- Lerby with Ajax in 1979

Personal information
- Full name: Søren Lerby
- Date of birth: 1 February 1958 (age 68)
- Place of birth: Copenhagen, Denmark
- Height: 1.84 m (6 ft 0 in)
- Position: Midfielder

Youth career
- B 1903
- Taastrup IK
- –1975: Fremad Amager

Senior career*
Years	Team	Apps	(Gls)
1975	Fremad Amager	13	(3)
1975–1983	Ajax	206	(66)
1983–1986	Bayern Munich	89	(22)
1986–1987	Monaco	27	(3)
1987–1990	PSV	81	(16)
Total		416	(110)

International career
1973–1975	Denmark U17	3	(0)
1974–1976	Denmark U19	14	(2)
1976–1977	Denmark U21	3	(0)
1978–1989	Denmark	67	(10)

Managerial career
- 1991–1992: Bayern Munich
- * Club domestic league appearances and goals

Søren Lerby (born 1 February 1958) is a Danish former professional football player, manager, and agent. As a player, he spent most of his career in Dutch football, winning five Eredivisie championships with Ajax Amsterdam and two with PSV Eindhoven. With the latter club, he also won the 1988 European Cup. He won two Bundesliga titles with Bayern Munich, and played one season for AS Monaco in France. He played 67 matches for the Denmark national football team from 1978 to 1989, and represented Denmark at the 1986 FIFA World Cup and two European Championship tournaments.

== Club career ==
Lerby was born in Copenhagen, the son of former Danish under-21 football international Kaj Lerby. Lerby played his youth football with local clubs B 1903, Taastrup IK and Fremad Amager. He got his senior debut with Fremad Amager, playing 13 games and scoring three goals in the top-flight 1975 1st Division season. He and Fremad Amager teammate Frank Arnesen moved abroad to become professional footballers in November 1975.

They switched to the Dutch club Ajax Amsterdam, when Lerby was only 17 years old. Lerby's first home game was a 4–1 against Go Ahead Eagles on 11 April 1976. He won three Dutch Eredivisie league titles in his first six years at Ajax, in the 1976–77, 1978–79, and 1979–80 seasons. In the summer of 1981 he was named team captain, succeeding newly departed Frank Arnesen. In the two seasons Lerby was captain, Ajax won a further two Dutch championships with high goal differences.

He moved to Germany in 1983, replacing midfielder Paul Breitner at Bayern Munich. He remained there for three years, winning two German Bundesliga championships and two DFB-Pokal cup trophies. His career continued for French team AS Monaco from 1986 to 1987.

Lerby moved back to the Netherlands in 1987 and was reunited with Frank Arnesen at Ajax' rivals PSV Eindhoven. He was a part of the 1988 European Cup winning PSV squad, also including fellow Danes Jan Heintze and Ivan Nielsen, though Frank Arnesen missed the final against S.L. Benfica because of injury. Lerby ended his active career in 1990.

== International career ==
While a youth player with Taastrup IK, Lerby was called up for the Danish under-17 national team in October 1973. He debuted for the Danish under-19 national team in April 1974, and represented the team at the 1974 and 1975 European Under-19 Football Championships. He also played three games for the Danish under-21 national team.

While at Ajax, he made his senior Danish national team debut against the Republic of Ireland in May 1978, scoring one goal in the 3–3 draw. Lerby was selected for the Danish national team at the 1984 European Championship, where he played in all four of Denmark's matches, and scored a goal in the semi-final against Spain, which saw Denmark eliminated on penalty shoot-out. At the 1986 FIFA World Cup he played in Denmark's four games, scoring in Denmark's 6–1 win against Uruguay. He was a part of the Danish squad for the 1988 European Championship.

== Later career ==
Between 9 October 1991 and 11 March 1992, he spent some time as coach with Bayern Munich, as successor of Jupp Heynckes. With a spell of undistinguished results, including a combined 6–3 UEFA Cup elimination by his former club B 1903, Lerby effectively ended his managerial career and became a FIFA-licensed sports agent (Essel Sports Managements).

== Playing style ==
A left-footed midfielder with a powerful shot and great stamina, Lerby was a player who was always committed and a leader of the team. He once played two competitive matches in two countries on a single day on 13 November 1985: first in the afternoon a World Cup qualifier with Denmark against the Republic of Ireland in Dublin, being substituted having helped to secure a solid lead, and later in the evening a DFB-Pokal match with Bayern Munich against VfL Bochum, entering as a half-time replacement. Denmark qualified for the 1986 FIFA World Cup, and Bayern went on to lift the cup.

== Honours ==
Ajax

- Eredivisie: 1976–77, 1978–79, 1979–80, 1981–82, 1982–83
- KNVB Cup: 1978–79, 1982–83

Bayern Munich

- Bundesliga: 1984-85, 1985-86
- DFB-Pokal: 1983-84, 1985-86

PSV

- Eredivisie: 1987–88, 1988–89
- KNVB Cup: 1987–88, 1988–89, 1989–90
- European Cup: 1987–88

== See also ==
- AFC Ajax-PSV Eindhoven rivalry
