= Marcel Coraș =

Romanian footballer

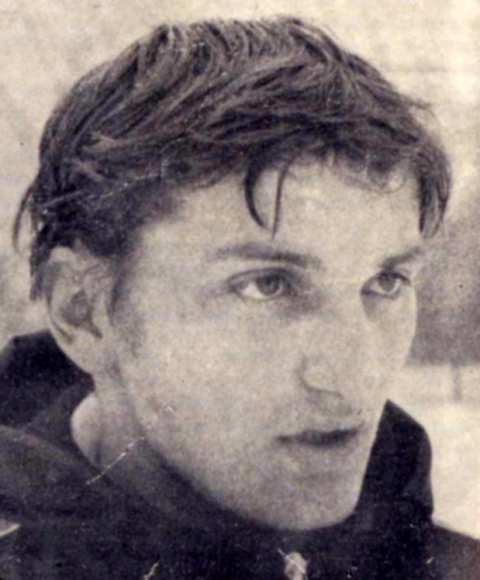

Personal information
- Date of birth: 14 May 1959 (age 67)
- Place of birth: Arad, Romania
- Height: 1.93 m (6 ft 4 in)
- Position: Forward

Youth career
- 1968–1976: UTA Arad

Senior career*
Years	Team	Apps	(Gls)
1976	UTA Arad	3	(0)
1976–1977	Rapid Arad		
1977–1979	UTA Arad	57	(16)
1979–1981	Politehnica Iași	31	(9)
1981–1983	UTA Arad	28	(11)
1983–1988	Sportul Studențesc	153	(56)
1988–1990	Victoria București	48	(40)
1990	Sportul Studențesc	13	(5)
1990–1991	Panionios	30	(2)
1991–1992	Sportul Studențesc	26	(4)
1992–1993	Aurillac		
1993	Universitatea Cluj	21	(2)
1994	UTA Arad	31	(3)
1995	Motorul Arad		
Total		441	(148)

International career
1982–1988	Romania	36	(6)

Managerial career
- 1996: UTA Arad
- 1997: FC Baia Mare
- 1998: Bihor Oradea
- 1999: Bihor Oradea
- 1999: Bihor Oradea
- 2000–2002: Astra Trinity Arad
- 2002–2004: ACU Arad
- 2005: UTA Arad
- 2006: UTA Arad
- * Club domestic league appearances and goals

Marcel Coraș (born 14 May 1959) is a Romanian former professional footballer who played as a forward.

== Club career ==
Coraș, nicknamed Dulapul (The Cabinet), was born on 14 May 1959 in Arad, Romania and began playing junior-level football in 1968 at local club UTA. He made his Divizia A debut on 18 April 1976 in UTA's 3–2 home loss to Olimpia Satu Mare. In the 1976–77 season, Coraș played for Divizia B club, Rapid Arad. Subsequently, he returned to UTA where at the end of the 1978–79 season, the team was relegated to the second league. Coraș remained in the first league, as he went to play for Politehnica Iași, but left them in the middle of the 1980–81 season to return to UTA in Divizia B, scoring seven goals that helped the club gain promotion back to Divizia A. He spent two more seasons with The Old Lady, and in the first one the team was relegated once again to the second league.

In 1983, Coraș went to Sportul Studențesc of Bucharest where he would form a successful offensive partnership with Gheorghe Hagi. In his first season he became top scorer of the league with 18 goals scored. In 1984 he had an offer from Fenerbahçe, but Sportul refused to let him go. In the 1985–86 season, he netted 13 goals which helped Sportul to a runner-up position. During his period spent with The Students, Coraș started playing in European competitions, making 16 appearances in the UEFA Cup over the course of five seasons. Most notably he played in a historical 1–0 victory against Inter Milan in the first round of the 1984–85 edition, though they did not qualify further after a 2–0 second-leg loss. In the 1987–88 edition, he helped them get past GKS Katowice, then Peter Schmeichel and Brian Laudrup's Brøndby, winning the second leg 3–0 after an away loss by the same score, securing a historic penalty shootout qualification to the third round where they were defeated by Hellas Verona against whom he scored a goal.

He left Sportul in 1988, going to Victoria București where he was coached by Florin Halagian. They finished the 1988–89 season in third place, Coraș contributing with 36 goals scored which earned him the European Silver Boot, being seven goals behind Dinamo București's Dorin Mateuț who was the Golden Boot winner. He also played eight games in the 1988–89 UEFA Cup campaign, as the team eliminated Sliema Wanderers against whom he scored a hat-trick, Dinamo Minsk and Turun Palloseura, being defeated in the quarter-finals by Dynamo Dresden. In the first round in the following season of the same competition, Victoria met Valencia, earning a 1–1 draw in the first leg but lost the second one with 3–1 in which Coraș netted his side's goal.

In the middle of the 1989–90 season, Coraș returned to Sportul. In the 1990–91 season, he had his first experience outside Romania at Greek side Panionios, scoring two goals in 30 games played for a 10th place. Afterwards he returned to Romania for a third spell at Sportul, then in 1992 with the help of László Bölöni he had his second spell abroad at French fourth league team, Aurillac. In 1993, Coraș went to Universitatea Cluj for a while. Subsequently, he returned for a fourth spell at UTA where on 15 October 1994 he made his last Divizia A appearance in a 3–0 away loss to Național București, totaling 413 matches with 147 goals in the competition. Coraș ended his career in 1995 at Divizia C club, Motorul Arad.

== International career ==
Coraș got 36 caps and six goals for Romania, making his debut while being a player at UTA Arad in the second league, as coach Mircea Lucescu sent him in the 75th to replace Marin Radu on 17 November 1982 in a 4–1 away loss in a friendly against East Germany. He scored his first goal for the national team in a friendly that ended in a 1–1 draw against Israel.

Lucescu used him for the entirety of all three games in the Euro 1984 final tournament, as his side failed to progress from their group. The results were a 1–1 draw against Spain, followed by a 2–1 loss to West Germany in which he scored his side's goal and finally a 1–0 loss to Portugal. After the game against Spain, the Reuters news agency praised Coraș:"Spain was dominated by the strong Romanian players. Romania had enough opportunities to score, especially through the skillful forays of Coraș, the top scorer of the Romanian championship". Coraș himself described his experience at the European tournament as:"The goal against the Germans was the highlight of my career. Especially since I was also Romania's top scorer that season. It was a nice tournament for us, but we were not used to playing important matches every three days."

Afterwards he played seven games in the 1986 World Cup qualifiers in which he scored once in a 3–1 away win over Turkey. He made his last appearance for The Tricolours on 30 March 1988 in a friendly that ended in a 3–3 draw against East Germany.

For representing his country at Euro 1984, Coraș was decorated by President of Romania Traian Băsescu on 25 March 2008 with the Ordinul "Meritul Sportiv" – (The Medal "The Sportive Merit") class III.

== Managerial career ==
Coraș started coaching in 1996 at UTA Arad, afterwards working for FC Baia Mare, Bihor Oradea, Astra Trinity Arad, ACU Arad and UTA once again, all of them in the Romanian lower leagues.

== Style of play ==
In a 2022 interview for Gazeta Sporturilor, Coraș described his style of play: "I was not a worker, (...) I was not a runner, a sprinter. I was a midfielder behind the forward or target forward. When I received the ball, I would try to pass to a teammate or score a goal. I knew what to do with the ball", also saying:"Of the more than 150 goals scored in Liga I, only about five were shots from outside the box. The rest were from the box, in front of the goal, from the goal line".

== Playing statistics ==
Scores and results list Romania's goal tally first, score column indicates score after each Coraș goal.

Goal	Date	Venue	Opponent	Score	Result	Competition
1	8 November 1983	Bloomfield Stadium, Tel Aviv, Israel	Israel	1–1	1–1	Friendly
2	7 March 1984	Stadionul Central, Craiova, Romania	Greece	1–0	2–0	Friendly
3	17 June 1984	Stade Bollaert-Delelis, Lens, France	West Germany	1–1	2–1	Euro 1984
4	13 November 1985	Atatürk Stadium, İzmir, Turkey	Turkey	2–0	3–1	1986 World Cup qualifiers
5	28 February 1986	Al-Iskandarīyah Stadium, Alexandria, Egypt	Egypt	1–0	2–2	Friendly
6	6 February 1988	Kiryat Eliezer Stadium, Haifa, Israel	Poland	1–0	2–2	Friendly

== Honours ==
UTA Arad

- Divizia B: 1980–81

Sportul Studențesc

- Divizia A runner-up: 1985–86

Individual

- Divizia A top scorer: 1983–84
- European Silver Boot: 1988–89
