= UEFA Euro 1984 =

European football competition

1984 UEFA European Football Championship
Championnat d'Europe de football France 1984

Tournament details
- Host country: France
- Dates: 12–27 June
- Teams: 8
- Venues: 7 (in 7 host cities)

Final positions
- Champions: France (1st title)
- Runners-up: Spain
- Third place: Portugal; Denmark

Tournament statistics
- Matches played: 15
- Goals scored: 41 (2.73 per match)
- Attendance: 599,669 (39,978 per match)
- Top scorer: (France) Michel Platini (9 goals)
- Best player: (France) Michel Platini

The 1984 UEFA European Football Championship final tournament was held in France from 12 to 27 June 1984. It was the seventh UEFA European Championship, a competition held every four years and endorsed by UEFA.

At the time, only eight countries took part in the final stage of the tournament, seven of which had to come through the qualifying stage. France qualified automatically as hosts of the event; in the tournament led by Michel Platini, who scored nine goals in France's all five matches, which is still the record for goals scored in a single tournament and until UEFA Euro 2020 was also the record for goals scored by a single player at all tournaments. France won the championship – their first major international title.

== Bid process ==
The hosting of the event was contested by bids from France and West Germany. The French bid was unanimously selected by the UEFA Executive Committee at a meeting on 10 December 1981.

== Tournament summary ==
=== Group matches ===
The opening game of the tournament featured France and Denmark. The sides played out a very close encounter until Michel Platini's goal on 78 minutes gave the hosts a 1–0 victory. The opening game also saw a premature end to the tournament for Danish striker Allan Simonsen, who suffered a broken leg. Platini then scored hat-tricks against both Belgium and Yugoslavia as the French recorded maximum points in Group 1. Denmark took second place in the group with victories over Belgium and Yugoslavia, while Belgium finished third with two points. Yugoslavia, despite going out with no points, gave the hosts a fright in their last group game when they took a 1–0 lead into half-time and then reduced France's 3–1 lead to one goal six minutes from time. The games in Group 1 were unusually high-scoring, and featured 23 goals over the six matches.

Group 2 provided fewer goals, but produced a huge surprise as West Germany failed to qualify for the semi-finals after a 1–0 defeat in their last match to Spain with a late goal by Antonio Maceda, and a late Portugal win by Nené against Romania that sent the holders out.

=== Semi-finals and final ===
The first semi-final between France and Portugal is often considered one of the best matches in the history of the European Championship. Jean-François Domergue opened the scoring for France but Portugal equalised through Rui Jordão on 74 minutes. The game went to extra time and Jordão scored again in the 98th minute to give the Portuguese a shock lead, but the French rallied and Domergue equalised with six minutes left. Then, in the dying moments of the match and with a penalty shoot-out looming, Platini scored his eighth goal of the championship to give France a memorable 3–2 victory.

The other semi-final between Spain and Denmark saw two evenly matched sides draw 1–1 after extra time, as Søren Lerby's goal after only seven minutes was cancelled out by Maceda’s strike an hour later. The match went to a penalty shoot-out, and Spain converted all five of their penalties to win 5–4 and reach the final for the first time since 1964.

The final was played to a capacity crowd at the Parc des Princes in Paris. Just before the hour mark, Platini scored from a free-kick to put France ahead following a mistake by Spanish goalkeeper Luis Arconada. France were reduced to ten players when Yvon Le Roux was sent off, but Spain were unable to equalise, and Bruno Bellone's goal in injury time made the final score 2–0. France had won their first major championship in world football.

== Qualification ==
Portugal and Romania made their debuts in the European Championship. France, the hosts and eventual winners, qualified for the first time since inaugural tournament in 1960, which they also hosted. Denmark qualified for the first time since 1964. Yugoslavia qualified after missing the 1980 tournament. Notable absentees were the 1982 FIFA World Cup winners and Euro 1980 hosts Italy, as well as 1966 World Cup winners England, Czechoslovakia, the Netherlands (who failed to qualify for the last time until 2016) and Hungary. This is the only time that the reigning European World Cup winners failed to qualify for the European Championship.

=== Qualified teams ===
Team	Qualified as	Qualified on	Previous appearances in tournament (Note: Bold indicates champion for that year. Italic indicates host for that year.)
France	Host	10 December 1981	1 (1960)
Belgium	Group 1 winner	12 October 1983	2 (1972, 1980)
Portugal	Group 2 winner	1 November 1983	0 (debut)
Denmark	Group 3 winner	16 November 1983	1 (1964)
West Germany	Group 6 winner	20 November 1983	3 (**1972**, 1976, **1980**)
Romania	Group 5 winner	30 November 1983	0 (debut)
Yugoslavia	Group 4 winner	21 December 1983	3 (1960, 1968, 1976)
Spain	Group 7 winner	21 December 1983	2 (**1964**, 1980)

Group 1 France Denmark Belgium Yugoslavia	Group 2 West Germany Spain Portugal Romania

== Organisation ==
=== Tournament format ===
After trying out several formats, UEFA finally developed for the 1984 tournament the format that would serve for all subsequent eight-team European Championships. The eight qualified teams were split into two groups of four that played a round-robin schedule. The top two teams of each group advanced to semi-finals (reintroduced after being absent from the 1980 tournament) and the winners advanced to the final. The third place play-off, widely perceived as an unnecessary chore, was dropped. As usual at the time, a win was credited with two points only, teams on equal points were ranked by goal difference instead of head-to-head results, and the sudden-death rule in extra time did not apply.

Fixtures were scheduled according to an innovative rotation schedule in which each team played its three first-round matches in three different stadia. Host France, for instance, played in Paris, Nantes, and Saint-Étienne. This formula had the advantage of exposing residents of a given city to more teams but implied multiple and sometimes costly trips from town to town for fans who wanted to follow their side. In subsequent championships, the organisers reverted to conventional schedules in which teams played in one or two cities only.

=== Overall impressions ===
Very few hooligan-related incidents were recorded throughout the tournament. Only one minor instance of fan trouble was recorded, in Strasbourg around the West Germany vs. Portugal match. The small group of German hooligans responsible for the incidents was arrested and deported back to West Germany on the same day using a new law specially passed by the French Parliament ahead of the Euro. Overall, the event was well-organised, a feat that established France's credentials as a host nation and eventually helped it win the right to stage the 1998 FIFA World Cup.

The entire competition was marked by fine weather which, along with the quality of play throughout the tournament and the absence of hooligans, contributed to a positive experience for teams and fans alike.

=== Mascot ===
The official mascot of this European Championship was Peno, a rooster, representing the emblem of the host nation, France. It has the number 84 on the left side of its chest and its outfit is the same as the France national team, blue shirt, white shorts and red socks.

== Venues ==
France's winning bid to host the Euro was based on seven stadia. The 48,000-seat Parc des Princes in Paris was the venue for the opening match and the final. Built in 1972, it was still state-of-the-art in 1984 and needed minor improvements only. Marseille's Stade Vélodrome was expanded to 55,000 seats to host one semi-final and some group matches, becoming France's largest stadium on the occasion. Stade de Gerland in Lyon, the venue for the other semi-final and some group matches as well, was thoroughly renovated and expanded to 40,000. Stade Geoffroy-Guichard in Saint-Étienne and Stade Félix-Bollaert in Lens were the other existing stadia that hosted group matches and were expanded to 53,000 and 49,000, respectively. Lastly, two all-new stadia were built to host group matches (and subsequently provided worthy home grounds for the traditionally strong local club teams): Stade de la Beaujoire in Nantes (53,000) was built on an entirely new site while Stade de la Meinau in Strasbourg was rebuilt from the ground up on the site of the old stadium into a modern 40,000-seat arena.

Paris	Marseille	Lyon
Parc des Princes	Stade Vélodrome	Stade de Gerland
Capacity: 48,360	Capacity: 55,000	Capacity: 51,860
UEFA Euro 1984 is located in France		Saint-Étienne
UEFA Euro 1984 is located in France		Stade Geoffroy-Guichard
UEFA Euro 1984 is located in France		Capacity: 48,274
Lens	Nantes	Strasbourg
Stade Félix-Bollaert	Stade de la Beaujoire	Stade de la Meinau
Capacity: 49,000	Capacity: 52,923	Capacity: 42,756

== Match officials ==
- (Austria) Heinz Fahnler
- (Belgium) Alexis Ponnet
- (Czechoslovakia) Vojtech Christov
- (East Germany) Adolf Prokop
- (England) George Courtney
- (France) Michel Vautrot
- (Italy) Paolo Bergamo
- (Netherlands) Jan Keizer
- (Scotland) Bob Valentine
- (Spain) Augusto Lamo Castillo
- (Soviet Union) Romualdas Juška
- (Sweden) Erik Fredriksson
- (Switzerland) André Daina
- (West Germany) Volker Roth

== Squads ==
Each national team had to submit a squad of 20 players.

== Group stage ==
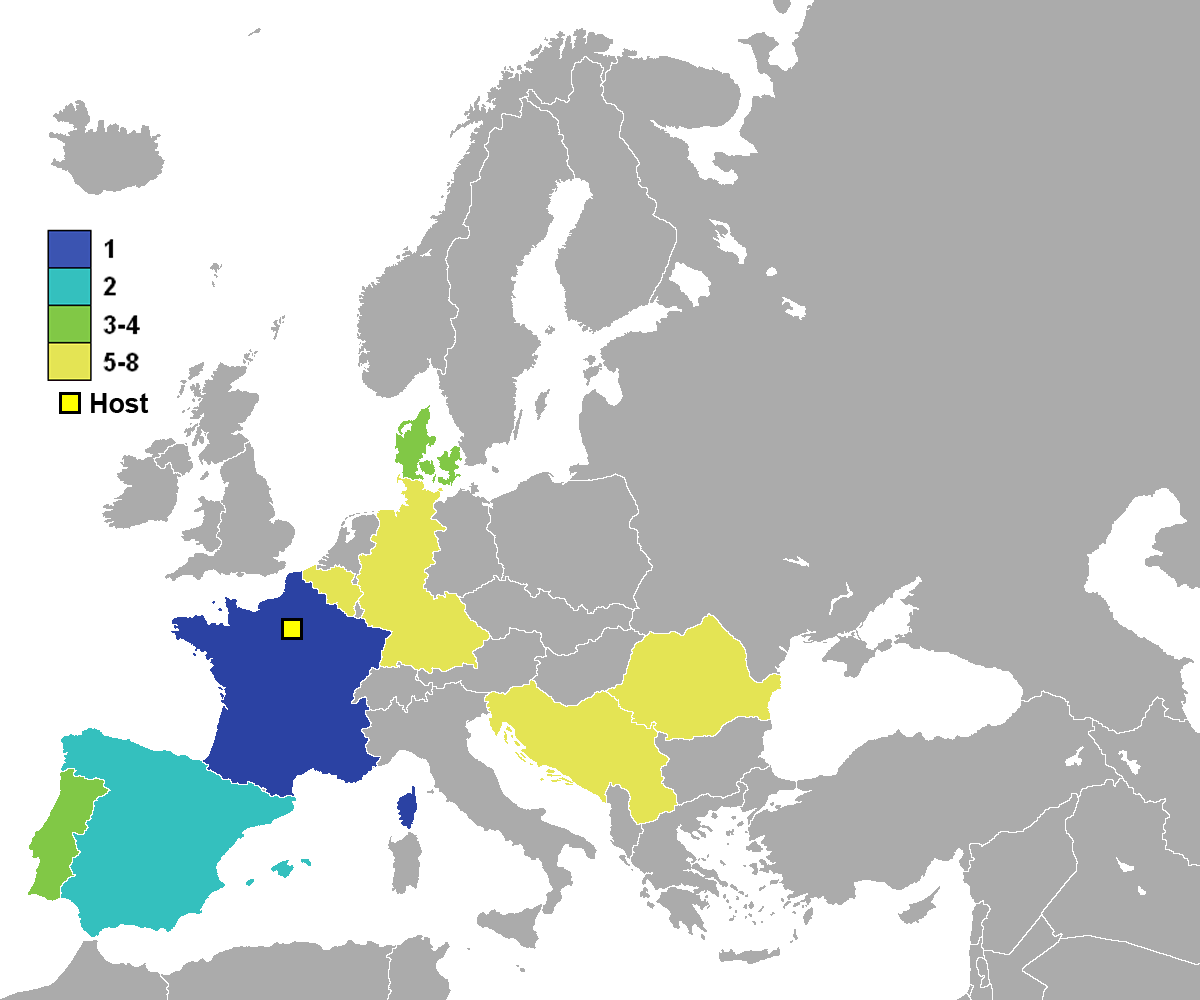
1984 UEFA European Championship finalists.

The teams finishing in the top two positions in each of the two groups progress to the semi-finals, while the bottom two teams in each group were eliminated from the tournament.

All times are local, CEST (UTC+2).

=== Tiebreakers ===
If two or more teams finished level on points after completion of the group matches, the following tie-breakers were used to determine the final ranking:

1. Goal difference in all group matches
2. Greater number of goals scored in all group matches
3. Drawing of lots

=== Group 1 ===
Pos	Team	Pld	W	D	L	GF	GA	GD	Pts	Qualification
1	France (H)	3	3	0	0	9	2	+7	6	Advance to knockout stage
2	Denmark	3	2	0	1	8	3	+5	4	Advance to knockout stage
3	Belgium	3	1	0	2	4	8	−4	2	
4	Yugoslavia	3	0	0	3	2	10	−8	0	

Source: UEFA
(H) Hosts
12 June 1984
20:30

France	1–0	Denmark
Platini 78'	Report

Parc des Princes, Paris
Attendance: 47,570
Referee: Volker Roth (West Germany)
13 June 1984
20:30

Belgium	2–0	Yugoslavia
Vandenbergh 28'; Grün 45'	Report

Stade Félix-Bollaert, Lens
Attendance: 41,525
Referee: Erik Fredriksson (Sweden)

16 June 1984
17:15

France	5–0	Belgium
Platini 4', 74' (pen.), 89'; Giresse 33'; Fernández 43'	Report

Stade de la Beaujoire, Nantes
Attendance: 51,359
Referee: Bob Valentine (Scotland)
16 June 1984
20:30

Denmark	5–0	Yugoslavia
Arnesen 8', 69' (pen.); Berggreen 16'; Elkjær 82'; Lauridsen 84'	Report

Stade de Gerland, Lyon
Attendance: 34,736
Referee: Augusto Lamo Castillo (Spain)

19 June 1984
20:30

France	3–2	Yugoslavia
Platini 59', 62', 77'	Report	Šestić 32'; D. Stojković 84' (pen.)

Stade Geoffroy-Guichard, Saint-Étienne
Attendance: 47,510
Referee: André Daina (Switzerland)
19 June 1984
20:30

Denmark	3–2	Belgium
Arnesen 41' (pen.); Brylle 60'; Elkjær 84'	Report	Ceulemans 26'; Vercauteren 39'

Stade de la Meinau, Strasbourg
Attendance: 36,911
Referee: Adolf Prokop (East Germany)

=== Group 2 ===
Pos	Team	Pld	W	D	L	GF	GA	GD	Pts	Qualification
1	Spain	3	1	2	0	3	2	+1	4	Advance to knockout stage
2	Portugal	3	1	2	0	2	1	+1	4	Advance to knockout stage
3	West Germany	3	1	1	1	2	2	0	3	
4	Romania	3	0	1	2	2	4	−2	1	

Source: UEFA
14 June 1984
17:15

West Germany	0–0	Portugal
	Report

Stade de la Meinau, Strasbourg
Attendance: 44,707
Referee: Romualdas Juška (Soviet Union)
14 June 1984
20:30

Romania	1–1	Spain
Bölöni 35'	Report	Carrasco 22' (pen.)

Stade Geoffroy-Guichard, Saint-Étienne
Attendance: 16,972
Referee: Alexis Ponnet (Belgium)

17 June 1984
17:15

West Germany	2–1	Romania
Völler 25', 66'	Report	Coraș 46'

Stade Félix-Bollaert, Lens
Attendance: 31,787
Referee: Jan Keizer (Netherlands)
17 June 1984
20:30

Portugal	1–1	Spain
Sousa 52'	Report	Santillana 73'

Stade Vélodrome, Marseille
Attendance: 24,364
Referee: Michel Vautrot (France)

20 June 1984
20:30

West Germany	0–1	Spain
	Report	Maceda 90'

Parc des Princes, Paris
Attendance: 47,691
Referee: Vojtech Christov (Czechoslovakia)
20 June 1984
20:30

Portugal	1–0	Romania
Nené 81'	Report

Stade de la Beaujoire, Nantes
Attendance: 24,464
Referee: Heinz Fahnler (Austria)

== Knockout stage ==
In the knockout phase, extra time and a penalty shoot-out were used to decide the winner if necessary.

For the first time at a European Championship, there was no third place play-off.

All times are local, CEST (UTC+2).

=== Bracket ===
Semi-finals
23 June – Marseille
France (a.e.t.)	3
Portugal	2
24 June – Lyon
Denmark	1 (4)
Spain (p)	1 (5)

Final
27 June – Paris
France	2
Spain	0

=== Semi-finals ===
23 June 1984
20:00

France	3–2 (a.e.t.)	Portugal
Domergue 24', 114'; Platini 119'	Report	Jordão 74', 98'

Stade Vélodrome, Marseille
Attendance: 54,848
Referee: Paolo Bergamo (Italy)

24 June 1984
20:00

Denmark	1–1 (a.e.t.)	Spain
Lerby 7'	Report	Maceda 67'
Penalties
Brylle (penalty scored); J. Olsen (penalty scored); Laudrup (penalty scored); Lerby (penalty scored); Elkjær (penalty missed)	4–5	(penalty scored) Santillana; (penalty scored) Señor; (penalty scored) Urquiaga; (penalty scored) Víctor; (penalty scored) Sarabia

Stade de Gerland, Lyon
Attendance: 47,843
Referee: George Courtney (England)

=== Final ===
27 June 1984
20:00

France	2–0	Spain
Platini 57'; Bellone 90'	Report

Parc des Princes, Paris
Attendance: 47,368
Referee: Vojtech Christov (Czechoslovakia)

== Statistics ==
=== Goalscorers ===
There were 41 goals scored in 15 matches, for an average of 2.73 goals per match. Michel Platini's nine goals remains a record in a single European Championship.

9 goals

- (France) Michel Platini

3 goals

- (Denmark) Frank Arnesen

2 goals

- (Denmark) Preben Elkjær
- (France) Jean-François Domergue
- (Portugal) Rui Jordão
- (Spain) Antonio Maceda
- (West Germany) Rudi Völler

1 goal

- (Belgium) Jan Ceulemans
- (Belgium) Georges Grün
- (Belgium) Erwin Vandenbergh
- (Belgium) Franky Vercauteren
- (Denmark) Klaus Berggreen
- (Denmark) Kenneth Brylle
- (Denmark) John Lauridsen
- (Denmark) Søren Lerby
- (France) Bruno Bellone
- (France) Luis Fernandez
- (France) Alain Giresse
- (Portugal) Nené
- (Portugal) António Sousa
- (Romania) László Bölöni
- (Romania) Marcel Coraș
- (Spain) Lobo Carrasco
- (Spain) Santillana
- (Socialist Federal Republic of Yugoslavia) Miloš Šestić
- (Socialist Federal Republic of Yugoslavia) Dragan Stojković

=== Awards ===
UEFA Team of the Tournament

Goalkeeper	Defenders	Midfielders	Forward
(West Germany) Toni Schumacher	(Denmark) Morten Olsen (Portugal) João Pinto (West Germany) Andreas Brehme (West Germany) Karlheinz Förster	(Denmark) Frank Arnesen (France) Alain Giresse (France) Michel Platini (France) Jean Tigana (Portugal) Fernando Chalana	(West Germany) Rudi Völler
