= France–Spain football rivalry =

International football rivalry

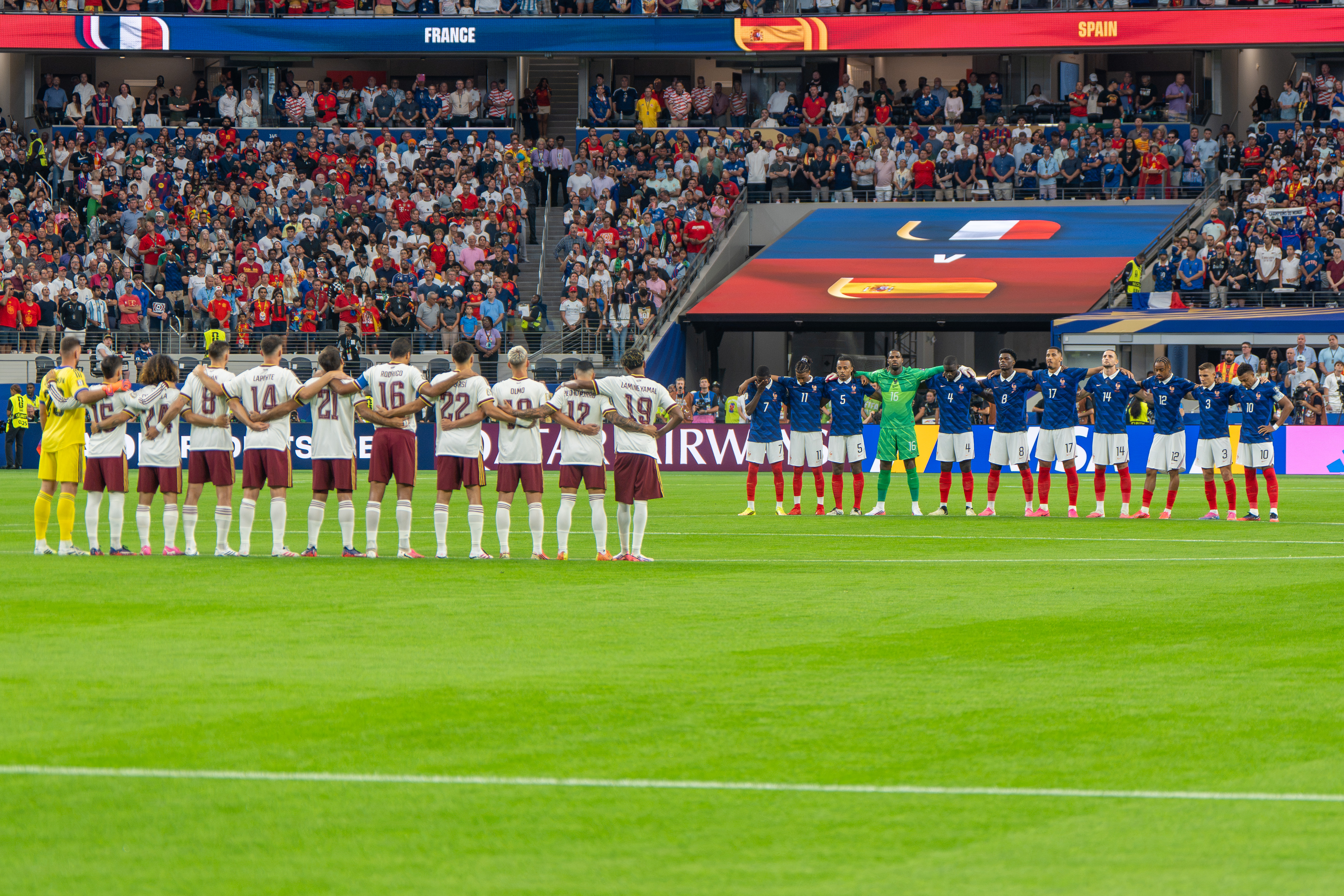
- Spain and France lining up before a 2026 FIFA World Cup semi-final encounter
- Location: Europe
- Teams: France; Spain
- First meeting: 30 April 1922; Friendly; France 0–4 Spain
- Latest meeting: 14 July 2026; FIFA World Cup; France 0–2 Spain

Statistics
- Total meetings: 39
- Most wins: Spain (19)
- All-time series: France: 13; Draw: 7 Spain: 19
- Largest victory: Spain 8–1 France; Friendly (14 April 1929)
- Largest goal scoring: Spain 8–1 France; Friendly (14 April 1929); Spain 5–4 France; UEFA Nations League finals (5 June 2025)

The France–Spain football rivalry (French: Rivalité footballistique France-Espagne, Spanish: Rivalidad futbolística entre Francia y España) is one of the biggest and most heated association football rivalries in Europe, between France and Spain, two of the most successful national teams in the world as well as neighbours in Europe.

== History ==
Like many European countries, football began to reach France and Spain in the late 19th century, and, just like any neighbors, Spain and France shared similar interests in promoting the sport. This led to the two countries' attempt to establish their football associations and seek friendlies. This led to the two countries playing their first-ever friendly in 1922, where Spain outclassed the host 4–0. However, subsequent turmoils meant that there was very little space for football in Spain and France to develop, with the French showed little interests on football at first even when hosting the 1938 FIFA World Cup and Spain was drowned into a brutal civil war. Eventually, World War II led to tensions between the two nations, as Spain was viewed with suspicion by France for sheltering several Nazi collaborators during the German occupation of France. After WWII, Spain and France established official relations, and football rivalry began to redevelop.

Initially, Spain achieved its first success in any major competition, winning the 1964 European Nations' Cup, and the rivalry remained a little one-sided with Spain being dominant until France's conquest of UEFA Euro 1984, in which they beat Spain in the final. Subsequently, with the following quick development of football in France, especially the establishment of INF Clairefontaine, football successes started to shift to France, and France proved to be more dominant in international achievements than Spain. The rivalry reached a new height after Spain suffered an agonizing 2–1 defeat to France in the 2021 UEFA Nations League final, which attracted media in both countries due to their successes in football competitions and has since become popular throughout confrontation between the two national teams as part of the multi-dimensional rivalry between two states.

Spain holds an edge by victories overall, winning 18 games compared to France's 13. However, in comparison to the number of competitive wins, France proves more dominant than Spain, with 6 wins compared to 5 of Spain. Moreover, France went undefeated against Spain in competitive fixtures until the UEFA Euro 2012 quarterfinal match. Spain has the lead in the 21st century, with 10 victories out of 14 matches between both teams, including defeats for France in the semi-finals of the last three major tournaments – 2024 UEFA Euro, 2025 UEFA Nations League and 2026 FIFA World Cup – earning the Spanish side the nickname of France's "Bête Noire".

In the 2020s, there were several players with close ties to both countries, including France's Antoine Griezmann, the Hernandez brothers Lucas and Théo (both of Spanish descent) who spent most or all of their careers in Spain, Karim Benzema and Raphaël Varane who had long spells at Real Madrid, the younger Wissam Ben Yedder, Eduardo Camavinga, Ousmane Dembélé, Jules Koundé, Thomas Lemar, Clément Lenglet, Ferland Mendy and Aurélien Tchouaméni who also featured prominently in La Liga, a Spanish contingent at Paris Saint-Germain (comprising internationals Marco Asensio, Juan Bernat, Ander Herrera, Sergio Ramos, Sergio Rico, Fabián Ruiz, Pablo Sarabia, and Carlos Soler over a handful of seasons), and France-born defenders Aymeric Laporte and Robin Le Normand who both opted to become naturalized to play for the Spain national team due to greater opportunities for selection in their position compared with their birth nation.

== Comparison in major tournaments ==
Key

Denotes which team finished better in that particular competition.
DNQ: Did not qualify.
DNP: Did not participate.
TBD: To be determined.

Tournament	France	Spain	Notes
1930 FIFA World Cup	7th	DNP	
1934 FIFA World Cup	9th	5th	
1938 FIFA World Cup	6th	Withdrew	
1950 FIFA World Cup	Withdrew	4th	
1954 FIFA World Cup	11th	DNQ	
1958 FIFA World Cup	3rd	DNQ	
Euro 1960	4th	Withdrew	
1962 FIFA World Cup	DNQ	12th	
Euro 1964	DNQ	1st	
1966 FIFA World Cup	13th	10th	
Euro 1968	DNQ		
1970 FIFA World Cup	DNQ		
Euro 1972	DNQ		
1974 FIFA World Cup	DNQ		
Euro 1976	DNQ		
1978 FIFA World Cup	12th	10th	
Euro 1980	DNQ	7th	
1982 FIFA World Cup	4th	12th	Tournament hosted by Spain.
Euro 1984	1st	2nd	In the final, France defeated Spain 2-0.
1986 FIFA World Cup	3rd	7th	
Euro 1988	DNQ	6th	
1990 FIFA World Cup	DNQ	10th	
Euro 1992	6th	DNQ	
1994 FIFA World Cup	DNQ	8th	
Euro 1996	4th	6th	In the group stage, the match ended 1-1.
1998 FIFA World Cup	1st	17th	Tournament hosted by France.
Euro 2000	1st	5th	In the quarter-final, France defeated Spain 2-1.
2002 FIFA World Cup	28th	5th	
Euro 2004	6th	10th	
2006 FIFA World Cup	2nd	9th	In the Round of 16, France defeated Spain 3-1.
Euro 2008	15th	1st	
2010 FIFA World Cup	29th	1st	
Euro 2012	8th	1st	In the quarter-finals, Spain defeated France 2–0.
2014 FIFA World Cup	7th	23rd	
Euro 2016	2nd	10th	Tournament hosted by France.
2018 FIFA World Cup	1st	10th	
Euro 2020	11th	3rd	Tournament hosted by multiple countries; Spain hosted some matches.
2022 FIFA World Cup	2nd	13th	
Euro 2024	4th	1st	In the semifinals, Spain defeated France 2-1.
2026 FIFA World Cup	4th	1st	In the semifinals, Spain defeated France 2–0.
Euro 2028	TBD	TBD	

== List of matches ==
=== Official matches ===
UEFA Euro 1984 final

27 June 1984
20:00 CEST

France	2–0	Spain
Platini 57'; Bellone 90'	Report

Parc des Princes, Paris
Attendance: 47,368
Referee: Vojtech Christov (Czechoslovakia)

UEFA Euro 1992 qualifying Group 1

20 February 1991
20:45 CET

France	3–1	Spain
Sauzée 14'; Papin 58'; Blanc 76'	Report	Bakero 10'

Parc des Princes, Paris
Attendance: 41,474
Referee: Tullio Lanese (Italy)
12 October 1991
20:30 CET

Spain	1–2	France
Abelardo 33'	Report	Fernández 12'; Papin 15'

Benito Villamarín, Seville
Attendance: 9,399
Referee: Hubert Forstinger (Austria)

UEFA Euro 1996 Group B

15 June 1996
18:00 BST

France	1–1	Spain
Djorkaeff 48'	Report	Caminero 85'

Elland Road, Leeds
Attendance: 35,626
Referee: Vadim Zhuk (Belarus)

UEFA Euro 2000 knockout stage

25 June 2000
20:45 CEST

Spain	1–2	France
Mendieta 38' (pen.)	Report	Zidane 32'; Djorkaeff 44'

Jan Breydel Stadium, Bruges
Attendance: 26,614
Referee: Pierluigi Collina (Italy)

2006 FIFA World Cup knockout stage

27 June 2006
21:00 CEST

Spain	1–3	France
Villa 28' (pen.)	Report	Ribéry 41'; Vieira 83'; Zidane 90+2'

FIFA WM-Stadion Hannover, Hanover
Attendance: 43,000
Referee: Roberto Rosetti (Italy)

UEFA Euro 2012 knockout stage

23 June 2012
21:45 EEST

Spain	2–0	France
Alonso 19', 90+1' (pen.)	Report

Donbass Arena, Donetsk
Attendance: 47,000
Referee: Nicola Rizzoli (Italy)

2014 FIFA World Cup qualification – UEFA Group I

16 October 2012
21:00 CEST

Spain	1–1	France
Ramos 25'	Report	Giroud 90+4'

Vicente Calderón, Madrid
Attendance: 46,825
Referee: Felix Brych (Germany)
26 March 2013
21:00 CET

France	0–1	Spain
	Report	Pedro 58'

Stade de France, Saint-Denis
Attendance: 78,329
Referee: Viktor Kassai (Hungary)

2021 UEFA Nations League final

10 October 2021
20:45 CEST

Spain	1–2	France
Oyarzabal 64'	Report	Benzema 66'; Mbappé 80'

San Siro, Milan
Attendance: 31,511
Referee: Anthony Taylor (England)

UEFA Euro 2024 knockout stage

9 July 2024
21:00 CEST

Spain	2–1	France
Yamal 21'; Olmo 25'	Report	Kolo Muani 9'

Allianz Arena, Munich
Attendance: 62,042
Referee: Slavko Vinčić (Slovenia)

2025 UEFA Nations League semi-final

5 June 2025
21:00 CEST

Spain	5–4	France
Williams 22'; Merino 25'; Yamal 54' (pen.), 67'; Pedri 55'	Report	Mbappé 59' (pen.); Cherki 79'; Vivian 84' (o.g.); Kolo Muani 90+3'

MHPArena, Stuttgart
Attendance: 51,724
Referee: Michael Oliver (England)

2026 FIFA World Cup semi-final

14 July 2026
14:00 CDT

France	0–2	Spain
	Report	Oyarzabal 22' (pen.); Porro 58'

AT&T Stadium, Arlington
Attendance: 70,176
Referee: Iván Barton (El Salvador)

=== Total matches ===
Number	Date	Country	Stadium and location	Competition	Game	Results	Home scorers	Away scorers
1	30 April 1922	(France)	Bouscat, Bordeaux	Friendly	France – Spain	0–4		Paulino Alcántara (2x); Manuel López Llamosas (2x)
2	28 January 1923	(Spain)	Atotxa Stadium, San Sebastián	Friendly	Spain – France	3–0	Juan Monjardín (2x); José Luis Zabala Arrondo	
3	22 May 1927	(France)	Stade de Colombes, Paris	Friendly	France – Spain	1–4	Jean Boyer	Domingo Zaldúa (2x); José María Yermo; Luis Olaso
4	14 April 1929	(Spain)	La Romareda, Zaragoza	Friendly	Spain – France	8–1	Paco Bienzobas; Gaspar Rubio (4x, (p)); Mariano Yurrita Llorente; Severiano Goiburu Lopetegui (2x)	Émile Veinante
5	23 April 1933	(France)	Stade de Colombes, Paris	Friendly	France – Spain	1–0	Jean Nicolas	
6	24 January 1935	(Spain)	Estadio Chamartín, Madrid	Friendly	Spain – France	2–0	Luis Regueiro; José Marrero	
7	15 March 1942	(Spain)	Estadio de Nervión, Nervión	Friendly	Spain – France	4–0	Paco Campos (2x); Edmundo Suárez; Epifanio Fernández	
8	19 June 1949	(France)	Stade de Colombes, Paris	Friendly	France – Spain	1–5	Jean Baratte (p)	Estanislau Basora (3x); Agustín Gaínza (2x, (p))
9	17 March 1955	(Spain)	Estadio Chamartín, Madrid	Friendly	Spain – France	1–2	Agustín Gaínza	Raymond Kopa; Jean Vincent
10	13 March 1958	(France)	Parc de Princes, Paris	Friendly	France – Spain	2–2	Just Fontaine; Roger Piantoni	László Kubala; Luis Suárez
11	17 December 1959	(France)	Parc de Princes, Paris	Friendly	France – Spain	4–3	Lucien Muller; Just Fontaine; Jean Vincent; Roger Marche	Luis Suárez; Eulogio Martínez; Martí Vergés
12	2 April 1961	(Spain)	Santiago Bernabéu Stadium, Madrid	Friendly	Spain – France	2–0	Enric Gensana; Francisco Gento	
13	10 December 1961	(France)	Stade de Colombes, Paris	Friendly	France – Spain	1–1	François Heutte	Félix Ruiz
14	9 January 1963	(Spain)	Camp Nou, Barcelona	Friendly	Spain – France	0–0		
15	17 October 1968	(France)	Stade de Gerland, Lyon	Friendly	France – Spain	1–3	Bernard Blanchet	Pirri; José Ufarte; Luis Aragonés
16	17 March 1971	(Spain)	Luis Casanova, Valencia	Friendly	Spain – France	2–2	Pirri (2x)	Hervé Revelli (2x)
17	8 November 1978	(France)	Parc de Princes, Paris	Friendly	France – Spain	1–0	Léonard Specht	
18	18 February 1981	(Spain)	Santiago Bernabéu Stadium, Madrid	Friendly	Spain – France	1–0	Juanito (p)	
19	5 October 1983	(France)	Parc de Princes, Paris	Friendly	France – Spain	1–1	Dominique Rocheteau	Juan Señor (p)
20	27 June 1984	(France)	Parc de Princes, Paris	UEFA Euro 1984 final	France – Spain	2–0	Michel Platini; Bruno Bellone	
21	23 March 1988	(France)	Parc de Lescure, Bordeaux	Friendly	France – Spain	2–1	Gérald Passi; Luis Fernández	Ramón Calderé
22	20 February 1991	(France)	Parc de Princes, Paris	UEFA Euro 1992 qualifying	France – Spain	3–1	Franck Sauzée; Jean-Pierre Papin; Laurent Blanc	José Mari Bakero
23	12 October 1991	(Spain)	Estadio Benito Villamarín, Seville	UEFA Euro 1992 qualifying	Spain – France	1–2	Abelardo Fernández	Luis Fernández; Jean-Pierre Papin
24	15 June 1996	(England)	Elland Road, Leeds	UEFA Euro 1996	France – Spain	1–1	Youri Djorkaeff	José Luis Caminero
25	28 January 1998	(France)	Stade de France, Saint-Denis	Friendly	France – Spain	1–0	Zinedine Zidane	
26	25 June 2000	(Belgium)	Jan Breydel Stadium, Bruges	UEFA Euro 2000	Spain – France	1–2	Gaizka Mendieta	Zinedine Zidane; Youri Djorkaeff
27	28 March 2001	(Spain)	Mestalla Stadium, Valencia	Friendly	Spain – France	2–1	Iván Helguera; Fernando Morientes	David Trezeguet
28	27 June 2006	(Germany)	FIFA WM Stadion Hannover, Hanover	2006 FIFA World Cup	Spain – France	1–3	David Villa	Franck Ribéry; Patrick Vieira; Zinedine Zidane
29	6 February 2008	(Spain)	Estadio Carlos Belmonte, Albacete	Friendly	Spain – France	1–0	Joan Capdevila	
30	3 March 2010	(France)	Stade de France, Saint-Denis	Friendly	France – Spain	0–2		David Villa; Sergio Ramos
31	23 June 2012	(Ukraine)	Donbass Arena, Donetsk	UEFA Euro 2012	Spain – France	2–0	Xabi Alonso (2x, (p))	
32	16 October 2012	(Spain)	Vicente Calderón Stadium, Madrid	2014 FIFA World Cup qualification	Spain – France	1–1	Sergio Ramos	Olivier Giroud
33	26 March 2013	(France)	Stade de France, Saint-Denis	2014 FIFA World Cup qualification	France – Spain	0–1		Pedro
34	4 September 2014	(France)	Stade de France, Saint-Denis	Friendly	France – Spain	1–0	Loïc Rémy	
35	28 March 2017	(France)	Stade de France, Saint-Denis	Friendly	France – Spain	0–2		David Silva (p); Gerard Deulofeu
36	10 October 2021	(Italy)	San Siro, Milan	2021 UEFA Nations League final	Spain – France	1–2	Mikel Oyarzabal	Karim Benzema; Kylian Mbappé
37	9 July 2024	(Germany)	Allianz Arena, Munich	UEFA Euro 2024	Spain – France	2–1	Lamine Yamal; Dani Olmo	Randal Kolo Muani
38	5 June 2025	(Germany)	MHPArena, Stuttgart	2025 UEFA Nations League Finals	Spain – France	5–4	Nico Williams; Mikel Merino; Lamine Yamal (2x); Pedri	Kylian Mbappé; Rayan Cherki; Daniel Vivian (o.g.); Randal Kolo Muani
39	14 July 2026	(United States)	AT&T Stadium, Arlington	2026 FIFA World Cup	France – Spain	0–2		Mikel Oyarzabal; Pedro Porro

== Statistics ==
=== Overall ===
As of 14 July 2026

Competition	Matches	Wins		Draws	Goals	
Competition	Matches	France	Spain	Draws	France	Spain
FIFA World Cup	2	1	1	0	3	3
FIFA World Cup qualifiers	2	0	1	1	1	2
UEFA European Championship	5	2	2	1	6	6
UEFA European Championship qualifiers	2	2	0	0	5	2
UEFA Nations League	2	1	1	0	6	6
All competitions	13	6	5	2	21	19
Friendly	26	7	14	5	23	54
All matches	39	13	19	7	44	73

=== Trophies ===
Competition	Titles	
Competition	Spain	France
FIFA World Cup	2	2
FIFA Confederations Cup	0	2
UEFA Euros	4	2
UEFA Nations League	1	1
Summer Olympics	2	1
Finalissima	0	1
All competitions	9	9
