= Bruno Bellone =

French footballer (born 1962)

Personal information
- Date of birth: 14 March 1962 (age 64)
- Place of birth: Toulon, France
- Height: 1.74 m (5 ft 9 in)
- Position: Winger

Youth career
- Cannet Rocheville

Senior career*
Years	Team	Apps	(Gls)
1980–1987	Monaco	205	(55)
1987–1988	Cannes	26	(9)
1988–1989	Montpellier	13	(2)
1989–1990	Cannes	31	(5)
Total		275	(71)

International career
1981–1988	France	34	(2)
Medal record
Representing France
FIFA World Cup
Third place	1986
UEFA European Championship
Winner	1984
CONMEBOL–UEFA Cup of Champions
Winner	1985
- * Club domestic league appearances and goals

Bruno Bellone (born 14 March 1962) is a French former professional footballer who played as a winger, and who earned 34 caps and scored two goals for France from 1981 to 1988. One of the goals was in the final of the 1984 European Championships, where France defeated Spain 2–0 to win the title. He was also in France's 1982 and 1986 World Cup squads.

== Career ==
Bellone played a significant role in two key incidents in France's 1986 World Cup quarter final against Brazil. Firstly, as the end of extra-time approached, he had a clear opportunity to score the winning goal, as he rounded Brazil goalkeeper Carlos on the edge of the penalty area. He was blocked by Carlos as he went past him, thus knocking him off balance and preventing him to reach the ball in time to score. The referee did not give a foul. In the penalty shoot-out, Bellone took France's third kick. The ball hit the post and rebounded onto Carlos and then back into the goal. Despite Brazilian protests, the goal was allowed to stand. France manager Henri Michel, confronted after the game with the possibility that Bellone's penalty should not have stood, pointed to the Carlos incident in open play and said "There was a certain justice in that". The laws of football were later clarified in favour of the referee's decision.

== Personal life ==
Bellone had to retire from football at the age of 28, following an ankle injury. He then suffered a series of personal setbacks, losing his savings in ill-fated investments. In 1998, Radio France wrongly reported that he had died. Bellone was able to pay off his debts in 1999, after a gala match was organised in his honour in Cannes. Since 2007, he has been working as a sports technical advisor for the commune of Le Cannet. He is a father of four.

== Honours ==
Monaco

- Division 1: 1981–82
- Coupe de France: 1984–85

France

- UEFA European Championship: 1984
- Artemio Franchi Cup: 1985
