= UEFA Euro 1984 final =

Final game of the UEFA Euro 1984

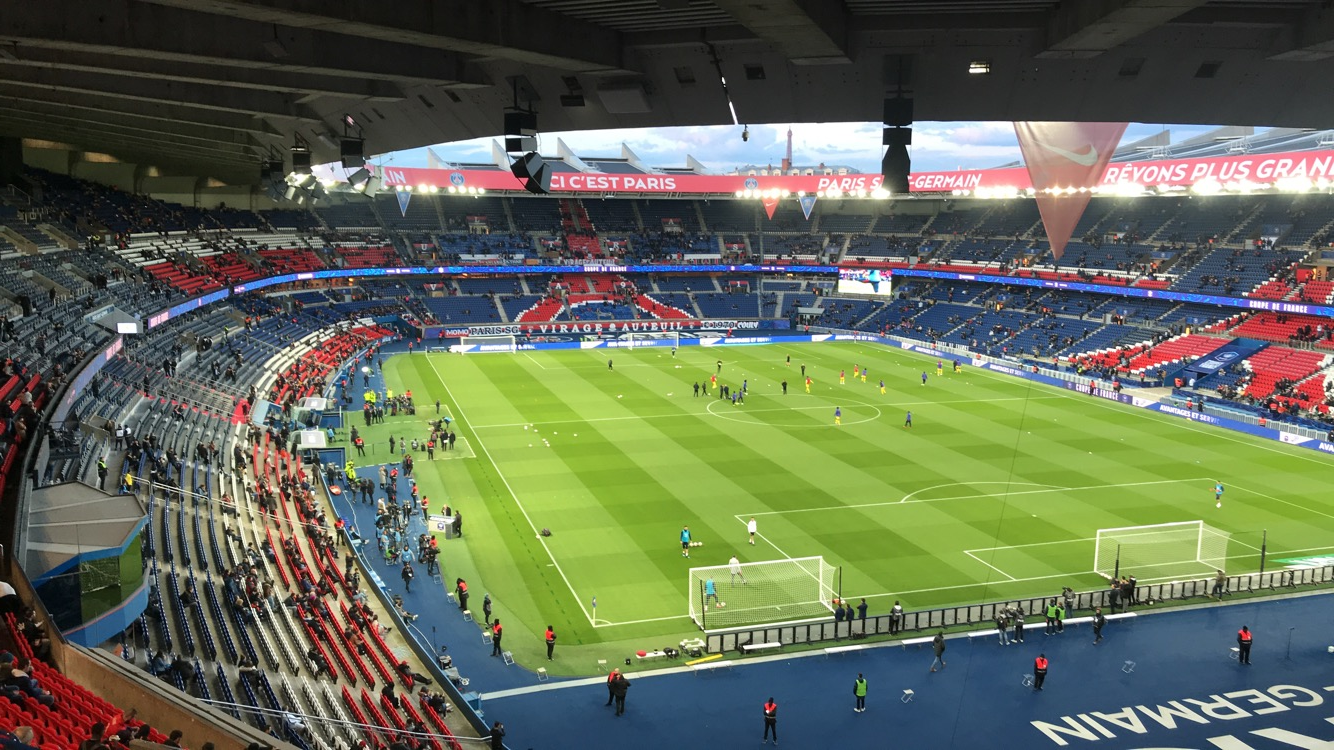
- The Parc des Princes in Paris (pictured in 2019) held the final
- Event: UEFA Euro 1984
France	Spain
2	0
- Date: 27 June 1984
- Venue: Parc des Princes, Paris
- Referee: Vojtech Christov (Czechoslovakia)
- Attendance: 47,368

The UEFA Euro 1984 final was the final match of Euro 1984, the seventh European Championship, UEFA's top football competition for national teams. The match was played at Parc des Princes in Paris, France, on 27 June 1984, and was contested between hosts France and Spain.

France automatically qualified for the finals as hosts of the tournament, and faced Denmark, Belgium and Yugoslavia in the group stage before a victory over Portugal in the semi-finals saw them progress to their first European Championship final. Spain ended top of their qualifying group, which included a 12–1 win over Malta, and progressed to Group 2. There they played Romania, Portugal and West Germany, before defeating Denmark in the semi-finals on penalties.

The final was played in front of 47,368 spectators and was refereed by Vojtech Christov from Czechoslovakia. France won 2–0 to claim their first international football title.

== Background ==
UEFA Euro 1984 was the seventh edition of the UEFA European Championship, UEFA's football competition for national teams. Qualifying rounds were played on a home-and-away round-robin tournament basis prior to the final tournament taking place in France, between 12 and 27 June 1984. There, the eight qualified teams were divided into two groups of four with each team playing one another once. The winners of each group then faced the runners-up from the other group in the semi-finals, the winners progressing to the final.

In the previous international tournament, the 1982 FIFA World Cup, France were knocked out in the semi-final by West Germany after a penalty shoot-out, and lost 3–2 to Poland in the third-place play-off. Spain failed to progress past the second qualifying group stage, losing to West Germany and drawing with England. The UEFA Euro 1984 Final was the twentieth meeting between France and Spain, with ten of those matches being won by Spain, four by France and the remainder ending in a draw. They had never faced each other in a competitive game.

== Route to the final ==
=== France ===
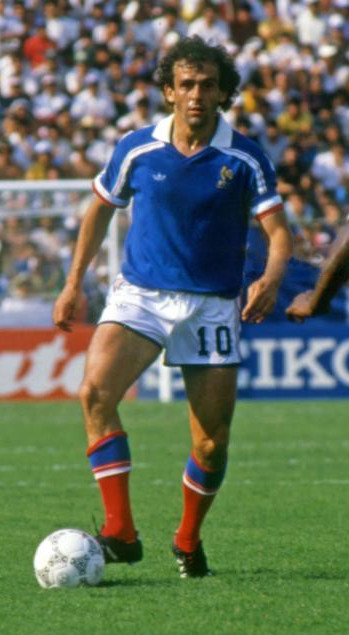
Michel Platini (pictured in 1986) scored nine goals in UEFA Euro 1984.

As tournament hosts, France automatically qualified for UEFA Euro 1984 Group 1 where they faced Denmark, Belgium and Yugoslavia in a round-robin tournament where each team played every other team once. France's first group match was against Denmark at the Parc des Princes in Paris on 12 June 1984. As the first half was drawing to a close, a tackle between Denmark's Allan Simonsen and Yvon Le Roux left the Danish player with a broken leg and forced his side to substitute him for John Lauridsen. Goalless at half time, the Denmark goalkeeper Ole Qvist made two separate saves from Michel Platini headers but with twelve minutes remaining, France took the lead. Ivan Nielsen's attempt to intercept a pass resulted in the ball falling to Platini whose shot from outside the Denmark penalty area deflected off Søren Busk's head and flew into the goal. In the 87th minute, Manuel Amoros reacted to fouls by both Lauridsen and Jesper Olsen, first by throwing the ball at Olsen and then headbutting him in the face: he was sent off by Volker Roth, the German referee, and the match ended 1–0.

In their second group game, France faced Belgium at the Stade de la Beaujoire in Nantes on 16 June 1984. In warm conditions, France dominated the match with Georges Grün making a goal-line clearance in the first thirty seconds. In the fourth minute, Patrick Battiston's 30-yard (27 m) shot struck the crossbar and the ball fell to Platini who sidestepped a defender before striking it into the corner of Belgium's goal. Belgium then missed numerous chances to score: Jan Ceulemans saw his header cleared off the goal-line by Luis Fernandez, Michel De Wolf's shot hit the crossbar and Erwin Vandenbergh's header went wide of France's goal. Alain Giresse doubled France's lead in the 33rd minute, chipping the ball over Jean-Marie Pfaff, the Belgium goalkeeper, after playing a one-two with Jean Tigana. In the 44th minute, Didier Six took the ball round Pfaff and crossed it to Giresse. He passed back to Fernandez who headed it into the Belgium goal to make it 3–0 at half time. In the 74th minute, Bernard Genghini pass to Six who was fouled by Pfaff. Platini took the resulting penalty, striking it into the middle of the goal to make it 4–0. With a minute remaining, Platini completed his hat-trick with a header which went in off the goalpost from Giresse's free kick, and France won 5–0.

The final group match for France was against Yugoslavia at the Stade Geoffroy-Guichard in Saint-Étienne on 19 June 1984. Yugoslavia took the lead in the 31st minute after Miloš Šestić beat Tigana and Giresse, exchanged passes with Safet Sušić before striking the ball into the top corner of the France goal. Giresse's shot then hit the crossbar but the first half ended 1–0 to Yugoslavia. Thirteen minutes after the interval, Jean-Marc Ferreri dispossessed Ljubomir Radanović and passed to Platini who struck the ball under Zoran Simović, the Yugoslavia goalkeeper, to level the score. Three minutes later, Battiston's cross found Platini who scored with a diving header to give France the lead. Joël Bats then saved an attempt from Mehmed Baždarević before Platini completed his second hat-trick of the tournament when he scored with a direct free kick which looped over the wall and into the top corner of the Yugoslavia goal. With ten minutes remaining, Stjepan Deverić was fouled by Maxime Bossis in the France box and Dragan Stojković scored the resulting penalty after a retake. France won the game 3–2 to finish their qualifying group top and progressed to the semi-finals.

There they faced the runners-up of Group 2, Portugal, at the Stade Vélodrome in Marseille on 23 June 1984. O'Brien describes the first twenty minutes of "one of the most unforgettable internationals of all time" as "dismayingly poor". Midway through the half, Platini was fouled by Jaime Pacheco and Jean-François Domergue struck the resulting free kick from 25 yards (23 m) over the wall and into the top corner of the Portugal goal, and France held a 1–0 lead at half-time. Early in the second half, Bento made saves against Fernandez and Giresse before Fernando Chalana played the ball into the France penalty area and found Jordão who headed it past Bats to equalise in the 74th minute. Bento then made saves to deny Platini and Six and regular time ended with the score at 1–1, sending the match into extra time. Both sides had opportunities to score, but midway through the first period of additional time, Chalana played a cross to Jordão who miskicked his volley into the ground but the ball bounced over Bats and into the France goal to give Portugal a 2–1 lead. Portugal adopted a defensive approach but with six minutes remaining, Domergue scored his and France's second goal, lifting the ball over Bento after play continued despite Platini being brought down by João Pinto. In the final minute, Tigana took possession of the ball, held off João Pinto, before passing to Platini who was 6 yards (5 m) out from goal: he turned and struck the ball into the roof of the Portugal net. France won the match 3–2 and secured passage to their first European Championship final.

=== Spain ===
Spain were drawn into group 7 of the UEFA Euro 1984 qualifying phase, where they faced the Netherlands, the Republic of Ireland, Iceland and Malta in a home-and-away round-robin tournament. They finished top of the group with six wins, including a 12–1 victory over Malta, one draw and one defeat, to the Netherlands. Despite being tied on points and goal difference with the Netherlands, Spain progressed having scored more goals. In UEFA Euro 1984 Group 2, they were drawn alongside Portugal, 1980 winners West Germany and Romania.

The first group game saw Spain face Romania at the Stade Geoffroy-Guichard in Saint-Étienne on 14 June 1984. In front of the tournament's smallest crowd of 16,972, Spain took the lead midway through the first half. Nicolae Ungureanu conceded possession to Juan Señor who passed to Ricardo Gallego. The Romania goalkeeper Silviu Lung pulled him down and Francisco Carrasco scored the resulting penalty to make it 1–0. The scores were level 13 minutes later when Marcel Coraș passed to László Bölöni who struck the ball into the near corner of Spain's goal. Mircea Rednic then shot wide from 7 yards (6 m). After a second half of limited opportunities to score, the match ended 1–1.

Spain's opponents for their second group match were Iberian rivals Portugal who they played at the Stade Vélodrome on 17 June 1984. Manuel Bento, the Portugal goalkeeper, made saves from Santillana and Gallego in the first half which ended goalless. Soon after the interval, Bento dropped a shot from Santillana but recovered in time to prevent Rafael Gordillo from scoring. In the 52nd minute, Álvaro passed to António Sousa who chipped the ball over Luis Arconada, the Spain goalkeeper, to give Portugal the lead. Chalana went close to doubling his side's lead but his shot struck the Spain crossbar. With 17 minutes to go, Carraasco's corner was not cleared by the Portugal defence and after Andoni Goikoetxea headed it goalbound, Santillana eventually scored to make it 1–1. Bento made a late save from Carrasco, and the match ended in a draw.

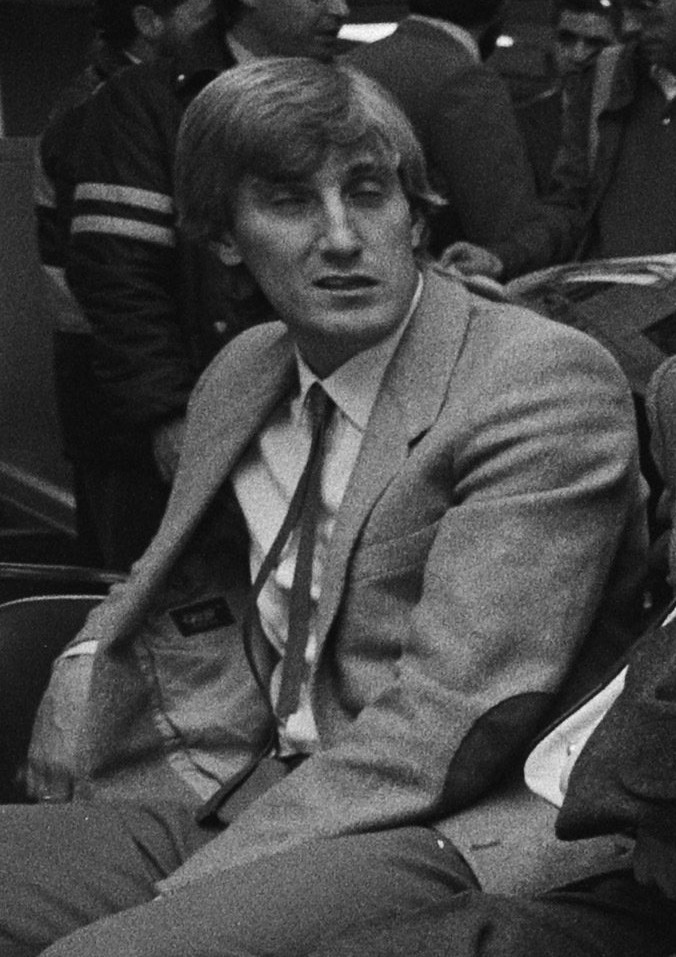
Antonio Maceda (pictured in 1983) scored the only goal in Spain's group victory over West Germany.

In their final group game which was held at the Parc des Princes in Paris on 20 June 1984, Spain's opponents were West Germany. West Germany started the game strongly: an early header from Hans-Peter Briegel struck the Spain crossbar, José Antonio Camacho cleared the ball off his own goal-line, Arconada's lengthy run ended with him shooting just wide of the post, another Briegel header hit the underside of the bar and Andy Brehme hit the post, while Goikoetxea was substituted through injury for Salva García after tackling Rudi Völler from behind. Before half-time, Uli Stielike fouled Salva García in the West Germany penalty area but Carrasco's penalty kick was saved by Toni Schumacher. Klaus Allofs missed two chances to score early in the second half before Schumacher blocked a shot from Carrasco and Antonio Maceda's header was cleared off the West Germany goal-line by Stielike. Arconada then saved a strike from Karl-Heinz Rummenigge "with superhuman speed" before denying Lothar Matthäus' half-volley. With less than a minute remaining, Pierre Littbarski's shot was off-target and Spain attacked en masse. Matthäus fouled Francisco and from the resulting free kick, Maceda scored with a low header after Schumacher failed to gather the ball. The match ended 1–0 and Spain ended the qualification phase top of the group, although tied with Portugal on points and goal difference, with a superior number of goals scored, and progressed to the semi-finals.

Their opponents were Denmark and the match was played at the Stade de Gerland in Lyon on 24 June 1984. Qvist made an early save from a Carrasco header before Denmark took the lead in the seventh minute. Frank Arnesen's cross was pushed onto the Spain crossbar by Arconada after a header from Preben Elkjær but Søren Lerby scored from the rebound to make it 1–0 to Denmark. The second half saw chances for both sides, with Denmark, in particular, being profligate in front of goal. Midway through the second half, Gordillo's cross eventually found Maceda who struck the ball into the bottom corner to level the score. Arnesen was then substituted for Olsen and although Denmark had two late chances to score, regular time ended 1–1 and the match went into extra time. Spain increased the pressure and Klaus Berggreen was sent off two minutes into the second period of additional time for a pull on Camacho. Arcando then saved from both Elkjær's free kick and Nielsen's follow-up shot and extra time ended with the scores still level, taking the match to a penalty shoot-out. Both sides scored their first four kicks: Kenneth Brylle, Olsen, Michael Laudrup and Lerby for Denmark; Santillana, Señor, Santiago Urquiaga and Víctor Muñoz for Spain. Elkjær took Denmark's fifth penalty and struck the ball over the crossbar. Manuel Sarabia, a second-half substitute, scored Spain's fifth penalty to secure his side's 5–4 victory and progression to their first European Championship final since the 1964 tournament.

=== Summary ===
France
Round
Spain
Opponent
Result
Group stage
Opponent
Result
Denmark
1–0
Match 1
Romania
1–1
Belgium
5–0
Match 2
Portugal
1–1
Yugoslavia
3–2
Match 3
West Germany
1–0
Group 1 winners

Pos	Team	Pld	Pts
1	France (H)	3	6
2	Denmark	3	4
3	Belgium	3	2
4	Yugoslavia	3	0

Source: UEFA
(H) Hosts
Final standings
Group 2 winners

Pos	Team	Pld	Pts
1	Spain	3	4
2	Portugal	3	4
3	West Germany	3	3
4	Romania	3	1

Source: UEFA
Opponent
Result
Knockout stage
Opponent
Result
Portugal
3–2 (a.e.t.)
Semi-finals
Denmark
1–1 (a.e.t.) (5–4 p)

== Match ==
=== Pre-match ===
Maceda and Gordillo were suspended and thus not available for selection by Spain, so Urquiaga and Francisco López were brought into the starting eleven. France made a single change to their team with Bruno Bellone coming in to replace Six.

=== Summary ===
The final took place at the Parc des Princes in Paris on 27 June 1984 in front of 47,368 spectators and was refereed by Vojtech Christov from Czechoslovakia.

In the opening minute, France won a free kick from which Bellone passed to Giresse whose shot was caught by Arconada. Urquiaga's cross was then punched out by Bats but fell to Víctor: his shot was blocked and Francisco's strike went wide of France's goal. In the 12th minute, Bellone's cross was narrowly missed by Lacombe and five minutes later, Señor's free kick was headed across the goal by Santillana and found Víctor but his header went over the France crossbar. In the 26th minute, Spain's Gallego was shown a yellow card for a foul on Bellone, and soon after Fernandez became the first France player to be booked, this time for dissent. Spain's Santillana missed two chances to score before half-time: his header was cleared off the line by Battiston, before his shot was wide of France's goal, and the first half ended goalless.

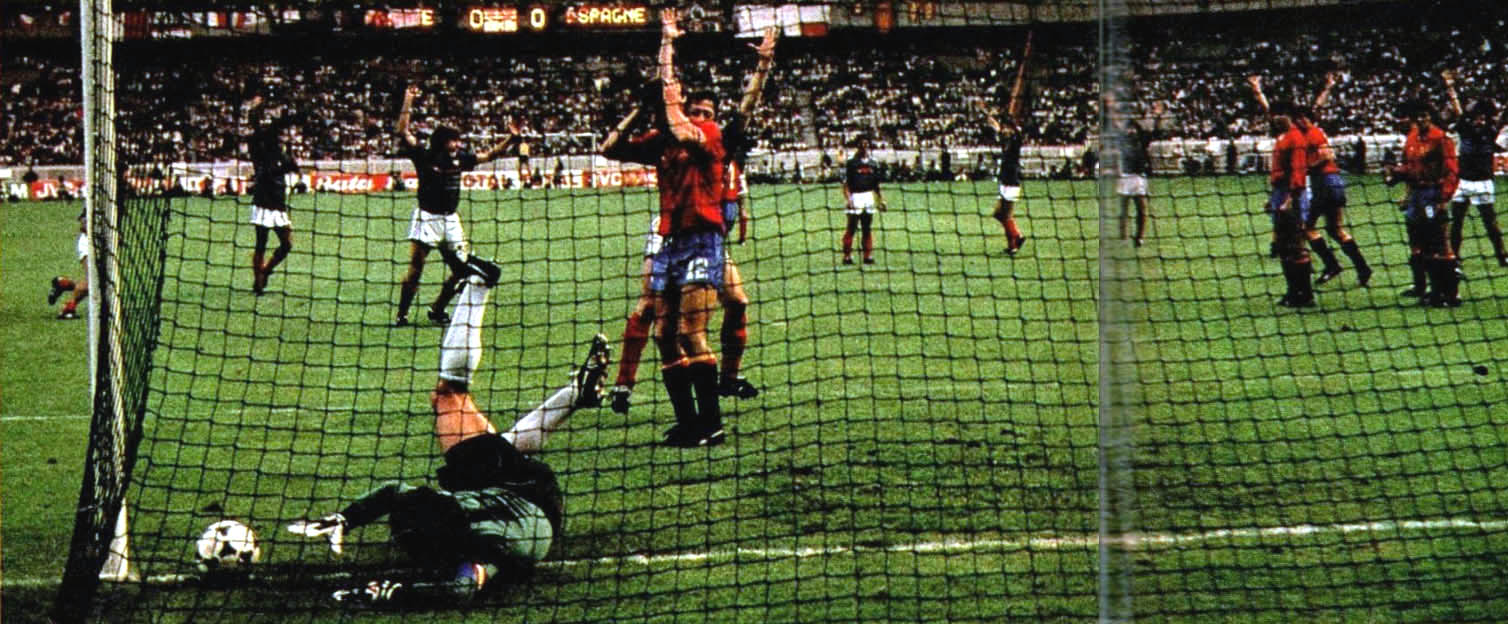
The first goal of France scored after Michel Platini took a free kick

Neither side made any changes during the interval, and in the 54th minute, Yvon Le Roux was booked for fouling Santillana. Three minutes later, France took the lead. The referee awarded a free kick after it appeared that Lacombe had been fouled by Salva on the edge of the Spain penalty area. Platini's low shot curled around the wall, Arconada appeared to have it covered but allowed the ball to squirm under his body and over the line, to make it 1–0 to France. Salva was then forced to make a clearance from Giresse before Arconda saved Lacombe's volley. Giresse's strike was wide after a run from Tigana in which he beat three Spain defenders.

With five minutes of the match remaining, Le Roux tripped Sarabia and was sent off after being awarded a second yellow card, reducing France to ten players and becoming the first player ever to be dismissed in a European Championship final. Seconds into stoppage time, Tigana's pass allowed Bellone to run through and chip the ball over Arconada as he ran off his line. The match ended moments later with France winning 2–0 to claim their first international football title.

=== Details ===
27 June 1984
20:00 CEST

France	2–0	Spain
Platini 57'; Bellone 90'	Report

Parc des Princes, Paris
Attendance: 47,368
Referee: Vojtech Christov (Czechoslovakia)

France	Spain

GK	1	Joël Bats
RB	5	Patrick Battiston		(substituted off) 73'
CB	4	Maxime Bossis
CB	15	Yvon Le Roux	(yellow card) 54' (yellow-red card) 85'
LB	3	Jean-François Domergue
DM	6	Luis Fernandez	(yellow card) 30'
CM	12	Alain Giresse
CM	14	Jean Tigana
AM	10	Michel Platini (c)
CF	17	Bernard Lacombe		(substituted off) 80'
CF	11	Bruno Bellone
Substitutions:
DF	2	Manuel Amoros		(substituted on) 73'
FW	9	Bernard Genghini		(substituted on) 80'
Manager:
Michel Hidalgo

GK	1	Luis Arconada (c)
RB	2	Santiago Urquiaga
CB	10	Ricardo Gallego	(yellow card) 26'
CB	12	Salva		(substituted off) 85'
LB	3	José Antonio Camacho
RM	11	Lobo Carrasco	(yellow card) 30'
CM	8	Víctor Muñoz
CM	16	Francisco
LM	14	Julio Alberto		(substituted off) 75'
AM	7	Juan Señor
CF	9	Santillana
Substitutions:
FW	19	Manuel Sarabia		(substituted on) 75'
MF	15	Roberto		(substituted on) 85'
Manager:
Miguel Muñoz

== Post-match ==
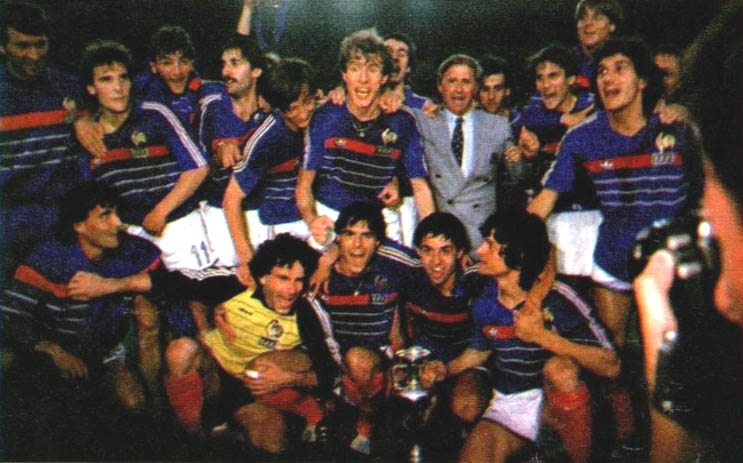
Players of France celebrating

France's Giresse, Tigana and Platini, were named in the UEFA team of the tournament, but no Spain player was selected. As of 2021, Platini's nine goals remains the record for the most scored during the tournament finals. He had won the 1983 Ballon d'Or, but retained it at the 1984 ceremony before winning it a third time in 1985. Platini was awarded the European Championship trophy by Jacques Chirac.

The France manager Michel Hidalgo later suggested that his side's success was "a triumph for attacking football after years of defensive attitudes". Platini said "It was a great moment for French football and for French sport as a whole ... We were superior to everybody and expressed ourselves on the pitch." British sports commentator John Motson described Platini as "unbelievable ... He was playing teams on his own. He was out of this world, a superstar. No team was able to contain him." French international footballer Emmanuel Petit later said "It was probably the most beautiful French team to watch in history."

In the next international tournament, the 1986 FIFA World Cup, France were beaten by West Germany in the semi-finals, but secured third place with a 4–2 victory in the play-off over Belgium, the side which had knocked Spain out in a penalty shoot-out in the quarter-finals.

== See also ==
- France at the UEFA European Championship
- Spain at the UEFA European Championship
- France–Spain football rivalry
