= Vojtech Christov =

Czechoslovak football referee

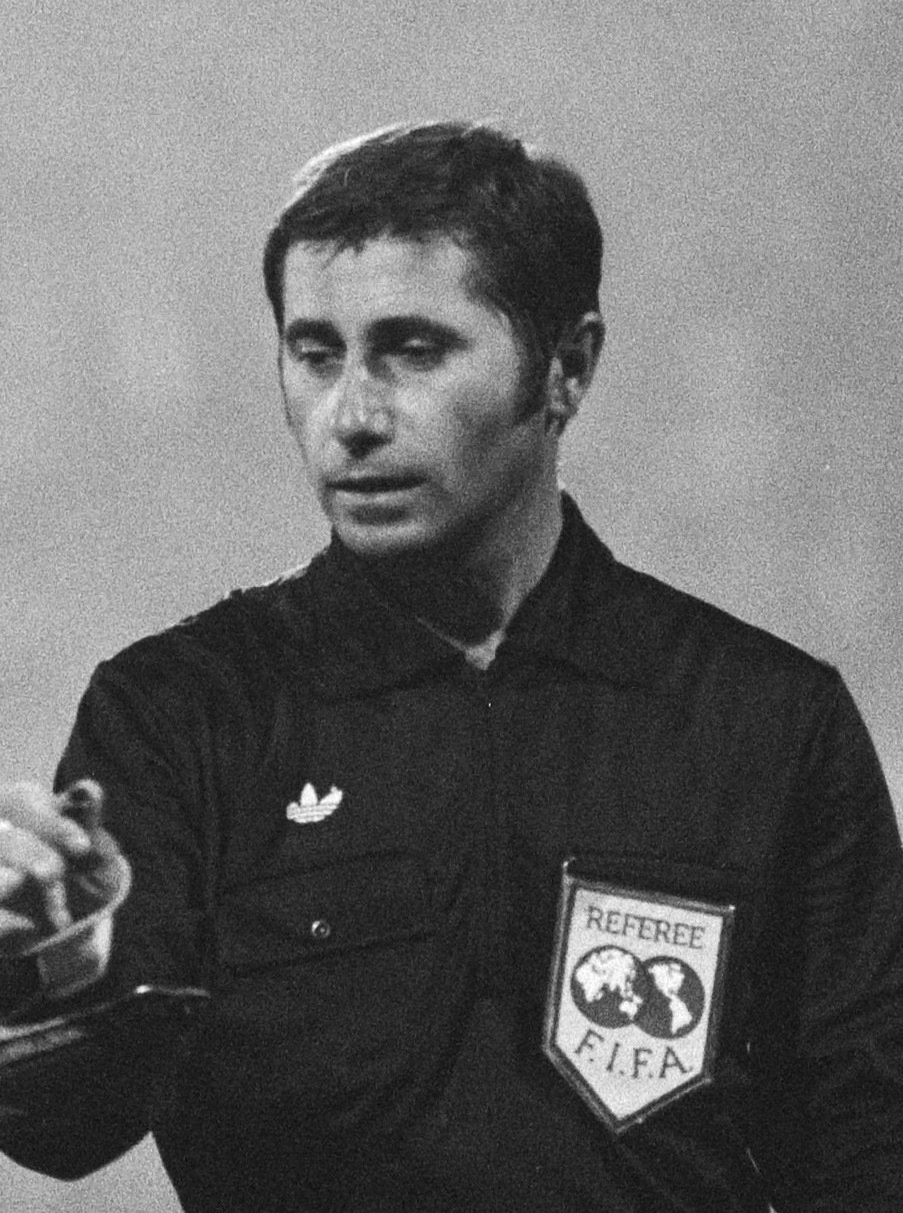
- Vojtech Christov in 1981
- Full name: Vojtech Christov
- Born: 16 March 1945 (age 81); Vranov nad Topľou, Slovakia

Domestic
Years	League	Role
1974-1992	Czechoslovak First League	Referee

International
Years	League	Role
1977-1991	FIFA listed	Referee

Vojtech Christov (born 16 March 1945 in Vranov nad Topľou) is a former Czechoslovak football referee. He is known for having refereed in two FIFA World Cups, one match in 1982 (the opening game of the tournament between Belgium and Argentina) and one in 1986. He was assistant referee in the 1982 FIFA World Cup Final. He also refereed two matches in the 1984 UEFA European Football Championship in France, including the UEFA Euro 1984 Final and one match in the Olympic Football Tournament 1980 in Moscow. At club level, he refereed in the Czechoslovak First League between 1974 and 1992, taking charge of 198 matches during that period.

Preceded by (Romania) Nicolae Rainea	UEFA European Football Championship final match referees 1984 (Czechoslovakia) Vojtech Christov	Succeeded by (France) Michel Vautrot
Preceded by UEFA Cup Winners' Cup Final 1979 (Hungary) Károly Palotai	UEFA Cup Winners' Cup Final Referees; Final 1980 (Czechoslovakia) Vojtech Christov	Succeeded by UEFA Cup Winners' Cup Final 1981 (Italy) Riccardo Lattanzi
