= Spain national football team =

Men's association football team

Spain
- Nickname: La Roja (The Red One)
- Association: Real Federación Española de Fútbol (RFEF)
- Confederation: UEFA (Europe)
- Head coach: Luis de la Fuente
- Captain: Rodri
- Most caps: Sergio Ramos (180)
- Top scorer: David Villa (59)
- Home stadium: Various
- FIFA code: ESP
First colours	Second colours

FIFA ranking
- Current: 1 (18 November 2026)
- Highest: 1 (July 2008 – June 2009, October 2009 – March 2010, July 2010 – July 2011, October 2011 – July 2014, September 2025 – April 2026, July 2026 –)
- Lowest: 25 (March 1998)

First international
- Spain 1–0 Denmark (Forest, Belgium; 28 August 1920)

Biggest win
- Spain 13–0 Bulgaria (Madrid, Spain; 21 May 1933)

Biggest defeat
- Italy 7–1 Spain (Amsterdam, Netherlands; 4 June 1928); England 7–1 Spain (London, England; 9 December 1931)

World Cup
- Appearances: 17 (first in 1934)
- Best result: Champions (2010, 2026)

European Championship
- Appearances: 12 (first in 1964)
- Best result: Champions (1964, 2008, 2012, 2024)

Nations League Finals
- Appearances: 3 (first in 2021)
- Best result: Champions (2023)
Medal record
Men's football
FIFA World Cup
Gold medal – first place	2010 South Africa	Team
Gold medal – first place	2026 Canada–Mexico–US	Team
UEFA European Championship
Gold medal – first place	1964 Spain	Team
Gold medal – first place	2008 Austria–Switzerland	Team
Gold medal – first place	2012 Poland–Ukraine	Team
Gold medal – first place	2024 Germany	Team
Silver medal – second place	1984 France	Team
UEFA Nations League
Gold medal – first place	2023 Netherlands	Team
Silver medal – second place	2021 Italy	Team
Silver medal – second place	2025 Germany	Team
FIFA Confederations Cup
Silver medal – second place	2013 Brazil	Team
Bronze medal – third place	2009 South Africa	Team
Olympic Games
Silver medal – second place	1920 Antwerp	Team

The Spain national football team, (Note: Spanish: Selección Española de Fútbol; Basque: Espainiako futbol selekzio nazionala; Catalan: Selecció de futbol d'Espanya; Galician: Selección de fútbol de España) nicknamed La Roja represents Spain in men's international football competitions since 1920, and is governed by the Royal Spanish Football Federation. They are the reigning World and European champions, having won the most recent FIFA World Cup in 2026 and the latest UEFA European Championship in 2024. Spain also won the World Cup in 2010, and won the UEFA Nations League in 2023. They have competed in 12 of the 17 UEFA European Championships and have won a record four titles. They are one of two European national teams, the other being France, to have won all three available major titles: the World Cup, the European Championship, and the Nations League.

The achievements of Spain's team from 2008 to 2012 have led many experts and commentators to consider them one of the best squads in football history. (Note: Attributed to multiple references:) During this period, Spain became the first national team to win three consecutive major titles, including the World Cup in 2010 and back-to-back European Championships in 2008 and 2012. Spain has won the FIFA Team of the Year award seven times, including every year from 2008 to 2013.

Spain holds the world record for the longest undefeated streak in men's international football, having played 43 consecutive matches between March 2024 and November 2026 without a loss. This streak gave them the highest ever Elo rating, surpassing the 1954 Golden Team from Hungary. Following their 2026 World Cup victory, Spain became the first national team to hold the men's and women's World Cup titles simultaneously and the first national team to win multiple World Cup titles in the 21st century.

== History ==
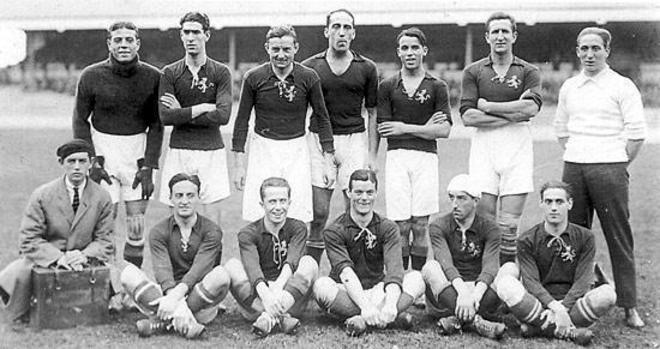
The Spain national football team in the 1920 Summer Olympics in Antwerp

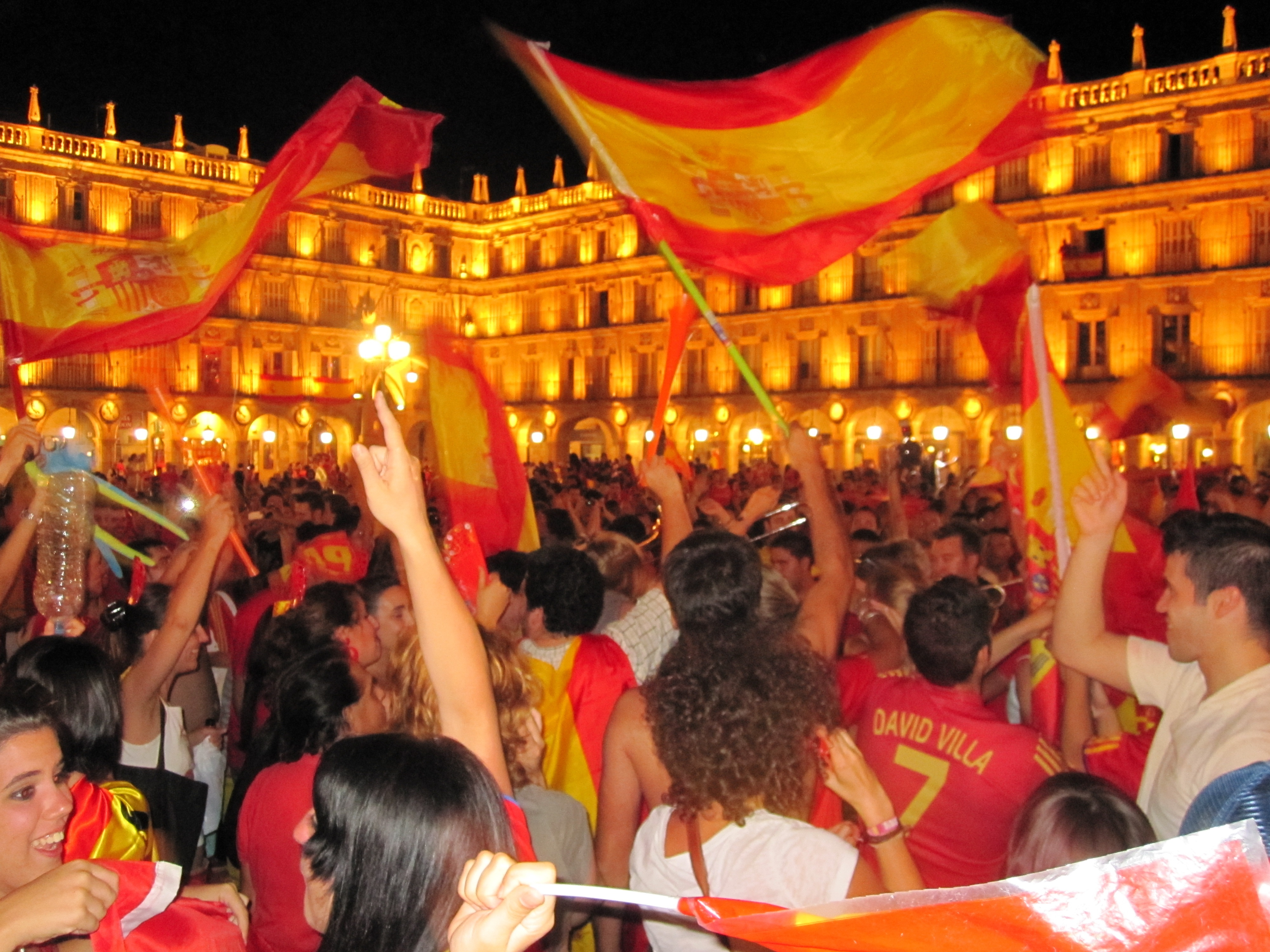
Spaniards celebrating the 2010 FIFA World Cup in Salamanca

Spain has been a member of FIFA since its founding in 1904, although the Spanish Football Federation was not established until 1909. The first Spain national football team was created in 1920 to compete the 1920 Summer Olympics in Belgium. Spain made their debut at the tournament on 28 August 1920 against Denmark, silver medalists at the last two Olympic tournaments. Spain won the match 1–0 and eventually finished with the silver medal.

Spain qualified for their first FIFA World Cup in 1934. They defeated Brazil in their first game before losing in the quarter-finals to eventual champions Italy. The Spanish Civil War and World War II prevented Spain from playing any competitive matches between the 1934 World Cup and the 1950 World Cup qualifiers. At the 1950 World Cup in Brazil, Spain topped their group and finished fourth in the tournament. Until 2010, this was Spain's highest finish at the World Cup.

Spain won its first major international title when it hosted the 1964 European Nations' Cup, defeating the Soviet Union 2–1 in the final at the Santiago Bernabéu Stadium. The victory would stand as Spain's lone major title for 44 years. Spain was selected as host of the 1982 FIFA World Cup, reaching the second round and four years later they reached the quarter-finals before a penalty shootout defeat to Belgium. At UEFA Euro 1984, they lost the final against France. Spain reached the quarter-finals of the 1994 World Cup. The match became controversial when Italian defender Mauro Tassotti struck Luis Enrique with his elbow inside Italy's penalty area, causing Luis Enrique to bleed profusely from his nose and mouth, but it was not noticed nor sanctioned by referee Sándor Puhl. Had the official awarded a foul, Spain would have received a penalty kick. In the 2002 World Cup, Spain won its three group play matches, then defeated the Republic of Ireland on penalties in the second round. They faced co-hosts South Korea in the quarter-finals, losing in a shootout after having two goals controversially called back for alleged infractions during regular and extra time.

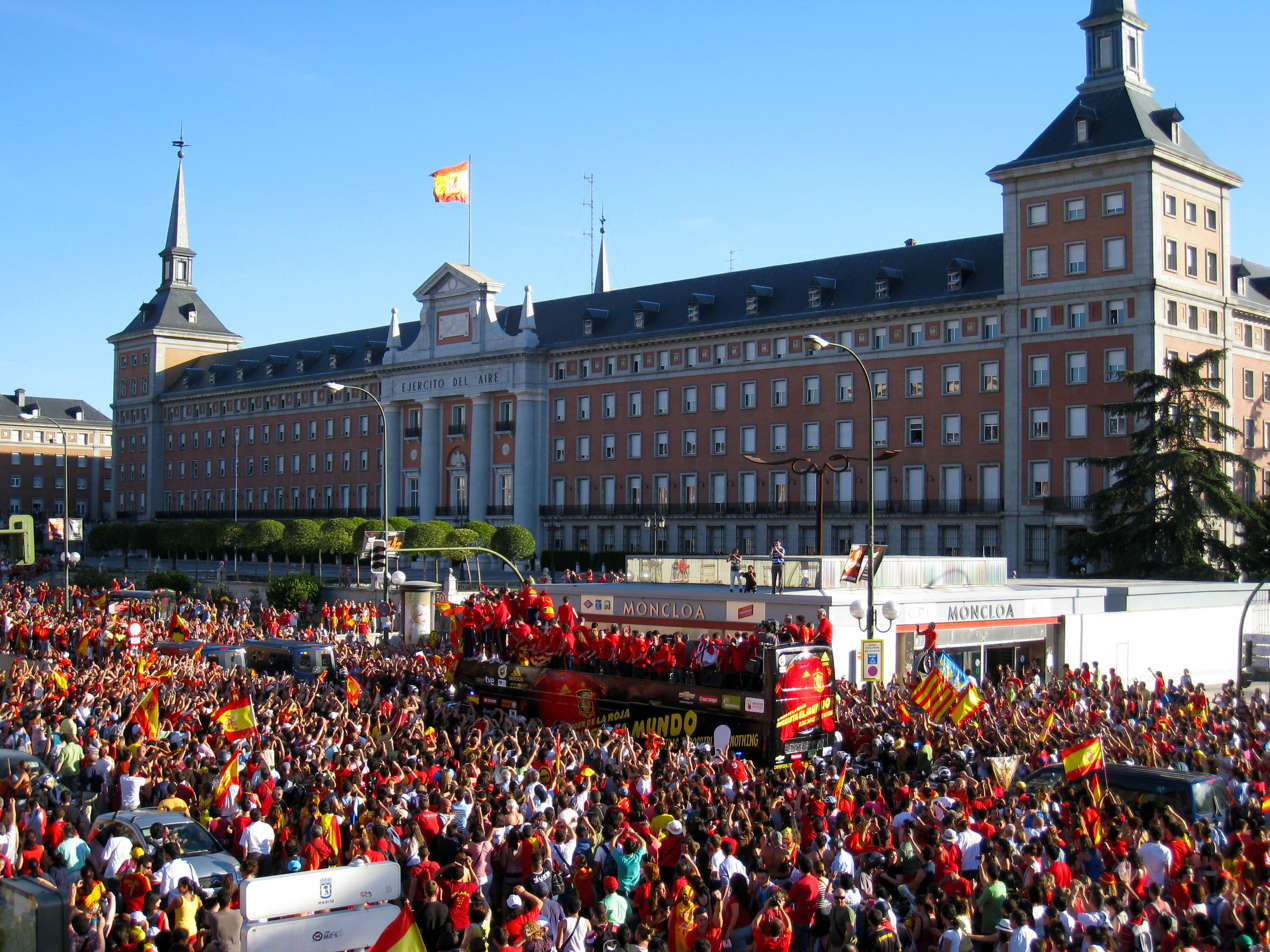
Spain celebrates winning the 2010 World Cup with a parade as they pass in front of the Air Force headquarters in Madrid

At UEFA Euro 2008, Spain won all their games in Group D. Italy were the opponents in the quarter-finals, where Spain won 4–2 on penalties. They then met Russia again in the semi-finals, beating them 3–0. In the final, Spain defeated Germany 1–0, with Fernando Torres scoring the only goal of the game, as Spain won their first major title since the 1964 European Championship. Xavi was awarded the player of the tournament. (Note: Spanish players named in the Team of the Tournament were goalkeeper and captain Iker Casillas; defenders Carles Puyol and Carlos Marchena; midfielders Xavi, Cesc Fàbregas, Andrés Iniesta and Marcos Senna; and strikers David Villa and Fernando Torres.) The following year the side finished third at the 2009 FIFA Confederations Cup breaking their 35-match unbeaten streak that began in November 2006 after a loss to the United States. In the 2010 World Cup, Spain advanced to the final for the first time ever by defeating Germany 1–0. In the decisive match against the Netherlands, Andrés Iniesta scored the match's only goal, coming in extra time. Spain became the third team to win a World Cup outside their own continent, and the first European team to do so. They then qualified for UEFA Euro 2012, finishing on top of Group I with a perfect 100% record. They became the first team to retain the European Championship, winning the final 4–0 against Italy, while Fernando Torres won the Golden Boot for top scorer of the tournament.

Spain advanced to the final of the 2013 FIFA Confederations Cup, losing to hosts Brazil, and the following year they were eliminated from the group stage of the 2014 World Cup. At Euro 2016 and the 2018 World Cup, the side were eliminated in the round of 16 in both tournaments, losing to Italy 2–0 and Russia 4–3 on penalties after a 1–1 draw. In the UEFA Euro 2020, held in 2021 after the COVID-19 pandemic caused delays, Spain made a breakthrough, reaching the last four of a major tournament for the first time since 2012, before losing to eventual champions Italy 4–2 on penalties after a 1–1 draw. The team finished the tournament with two wins and four draws (including two penalty shootouts). The same year they managed to reach the Nations League final, losing against France. In the 2022 World Cup, Spain finished second in their group before losing to Morocco 3–0 on penalties after a 0–0 draw, their third consecutive elimination from a major tournament in penalty shootouts.

Spain finished first in their group in UEFA Euro 2024 without conceding a goal, and went on to defeat Georgia in the round of 16 by a score of 4–1. They eventually eliminated hosts Germany in the quarter-finals with a 2–1 win and defeated France in the semi-finals with the same result, qualifying for their fifth European Championship final, where they won their record-breaking fourth European title by defeating England 2–1. Spain became the first team to win all seven matches in a single European Championship tournament, while setting a new record of 15 goals scored in a single European Championship.

Spain continued its success during the 2024–25 UEFA Nations League, where they defeated Netherlands in the quarter-finals and then France in the semi-finals, thus reaching their second consecutive UEFA Nations League final and their third overall appearance, with some commentators drawing similarities to Spain's previous "golden age". With their victory over France, Spain extended their undefeated record to 23 matches.

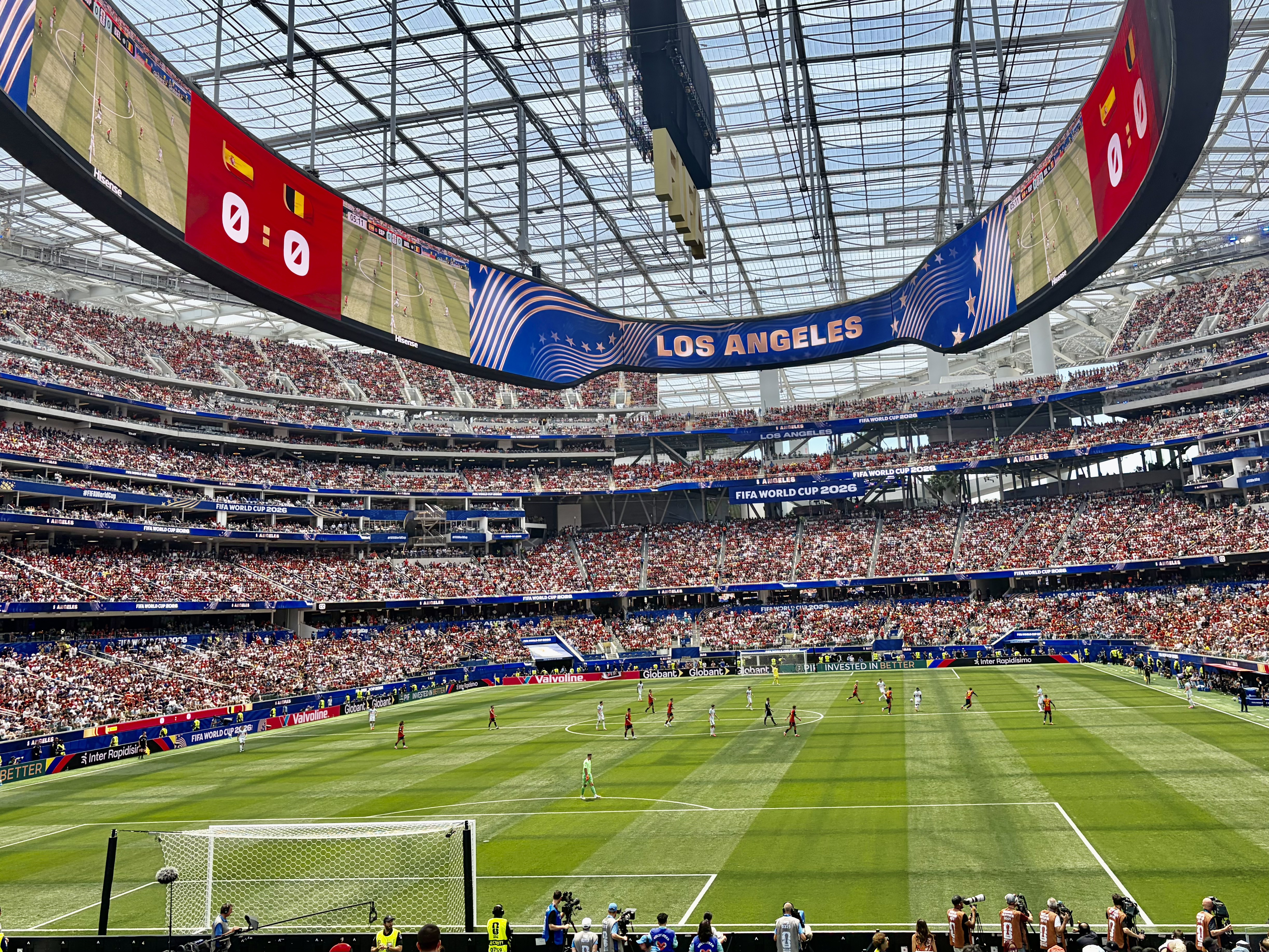
Spain playing against Belgium during the quarter-finals of the 2026 FIFA World Cup at SoFi Stadium in Los Angeles

Spain qualified for the 2026 FIFA World Cup after placing first in their group. During their 1–0 victory over Portugal in the round of 16, Spain's goalkeeper Unai Simón achieved a record sixth consecutive match without conceding a goal, surpassing the previous record of five matches set by Walter Zenga in 1990. The victory matched the country's previous record of 36th consecutive undefeated streak, having last lost against Colombia in a friendly match in March 2024. After defeating Belgium 2–1 in the quarter-finals, Spain advanced to the semi-finals for the second time in their history, and the first time since achieving their World Cup title in 2010. Spain achieved a 2–0 victory over France in the semi-finals, advancing to the World Cup final for the second time in their history. They defeated Argentina 1–0 in the final with a goal from Ferran Torres in the 106th minute, claiming their second World Cup title.

== Team image ==
=== Nicknames ===
Spain's team was known in the past by some fans as "La Furia Española", 'the Spanish Fury'; this nickname was originally given by a Dutch newspaper, recalling the "Sack of Antwerp" – an episode in the military history of Spain. More modernly, the team is called "La Roja" ('the Red One'). It's called "La Furia Roja" ('the Red Fury'), only by foreign journalists.

=== Style of play ===
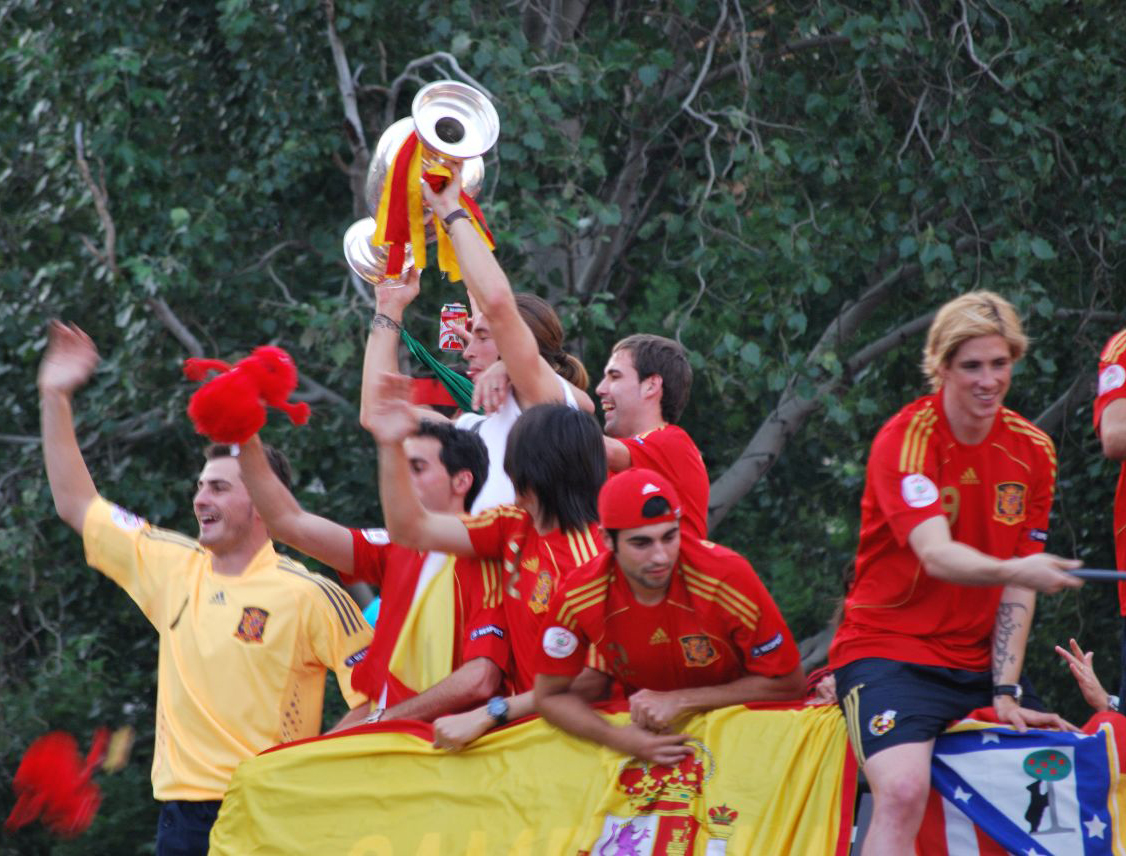
Spain, UEFA Euro 2008 winners

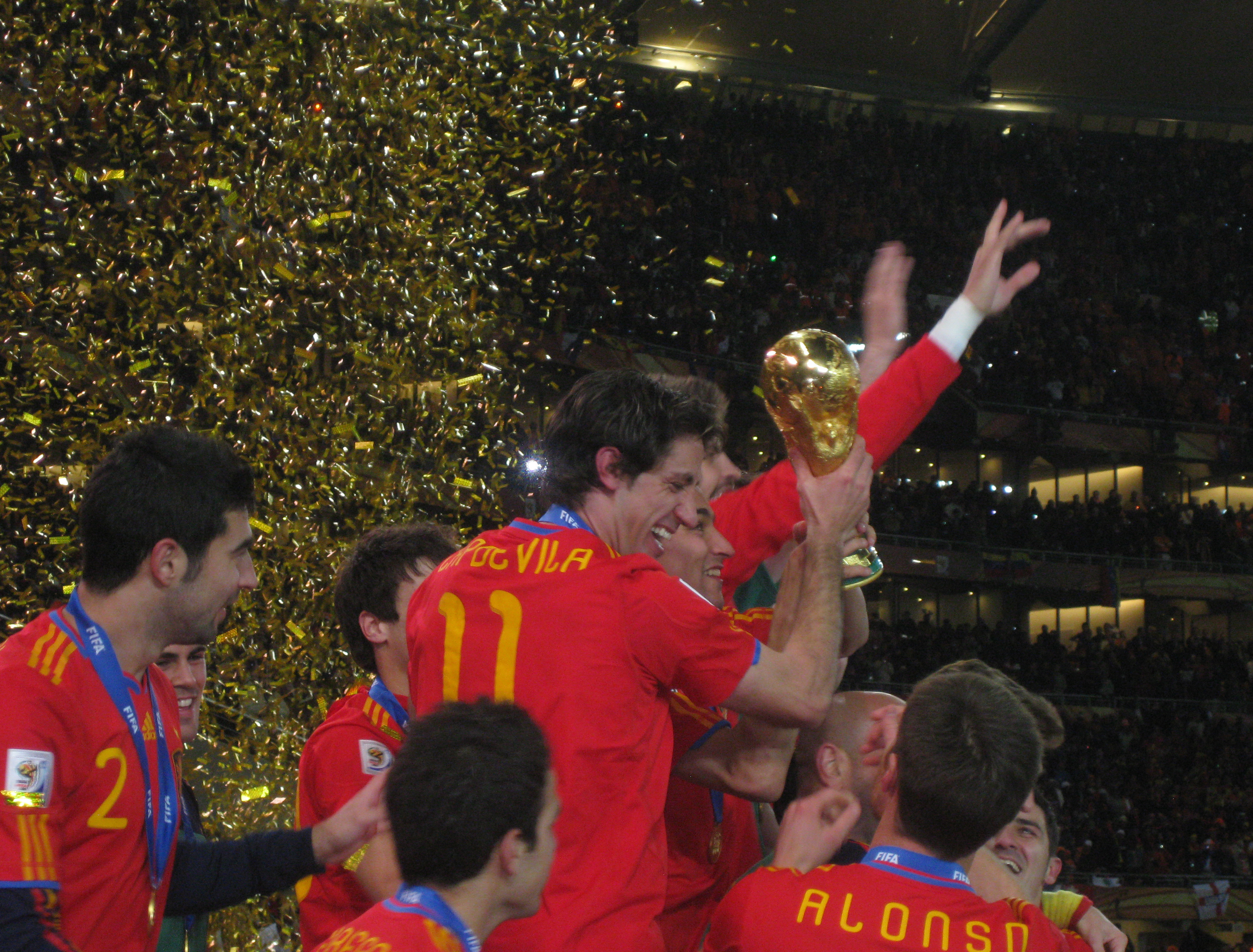
Spain's players celebrate winning the 2010 FIFA World Cup

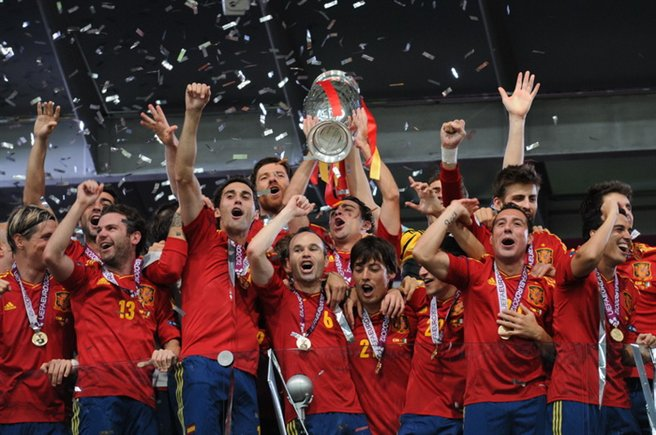
Spain, UEFA Euro 2012 winners

Between 2008 and 2012, the team played a style of football dubbed 'tiki-taka', a systems approach to football founded upon the ideal of team unity and a comprehensive understanding in the geometry of space on a football field.

Tiki-taka has been variously described as "a style of play based on making your way to the back of the net through short passing and movement", a "short passing style in which the ball is worked carefully through various channels", and a "nonsensical phrase that has come to mean short passing, patience and possession above all else". The style involves roaming movement and positional interchange amongst midfielders, moving the ball in intricate patterns, and sharp, one or two-touch passing. Tiki-taka is "both defensive and offensive in equal measure" – the team is always in possession, so doesn't need to switch between defending and attacking. Commentators have contrasted tiki-taka with "Route One physicality" and with the higher-tempo passing of Barcelona and Arsène Wenger's 2007–08 Arsenal side, which employed Cesc Fàbregas as the only channel between defence and attack. Tiki-taka is associated with flair, creativity, and touch, but can also be taken to a "slow, directionless extreme" that sacrifices effectiveness for aesthetics.

Tiki-taka was successfully employed by Spain to win Euro 2008, the 2010 World Cup and Euro 2012. The 2008–12 teams are regarded as being among the greatest of international teams in football history.

They have the Barcelona "carousel" of Xavi and Andrés Iniesta augmented by Real Madrid's Xabi Alonso in midfield.

— Phil McNulty of the BBC on the midfield players at the heart of Spain's tiki-taka passing style of play.

Sid Lowe identifies Luis Aragonés' tempering of tiki-taka with pragmatism as a key factor in Spain's success in Euro 2008. Aragonés used tiki-taka to "protect a defense that appeared suspect [...], maintain possession and dominate games" without taking the style to "evangelical extremes". None of Spain's first six goals in the tournament came from tiki-taka: five came from direct breaks and one from a set play. For Lowe, Spain's success in the 2010 World Cup was evidence of the meeting of two traditions in Spanish football: the "powerful, aggressive, direct" style that earned the silver medal-winning 1920 Antwerp Olympic team the nickname La furia española ('The Spanish Fury') and the tiki-taka style of the contemporary Spain's team, which focused on a collective, short-passing, technical and possession-based game.

Analyzing Spain's semi-final victory over Germany at the 2010 World Cup, Raphael Honigstein described Spain's tiki-taka style as "the most difficult version of football possible: an uncompromising passing game, coupled with intense, high pressing". For Honigstein, tiki-taka is "a significant upgrade" of the Netherlands' Total Football because it relies on ball movement rather than players switching position. Tiki-taka allowed Spain to "control both the ball and the opponent".

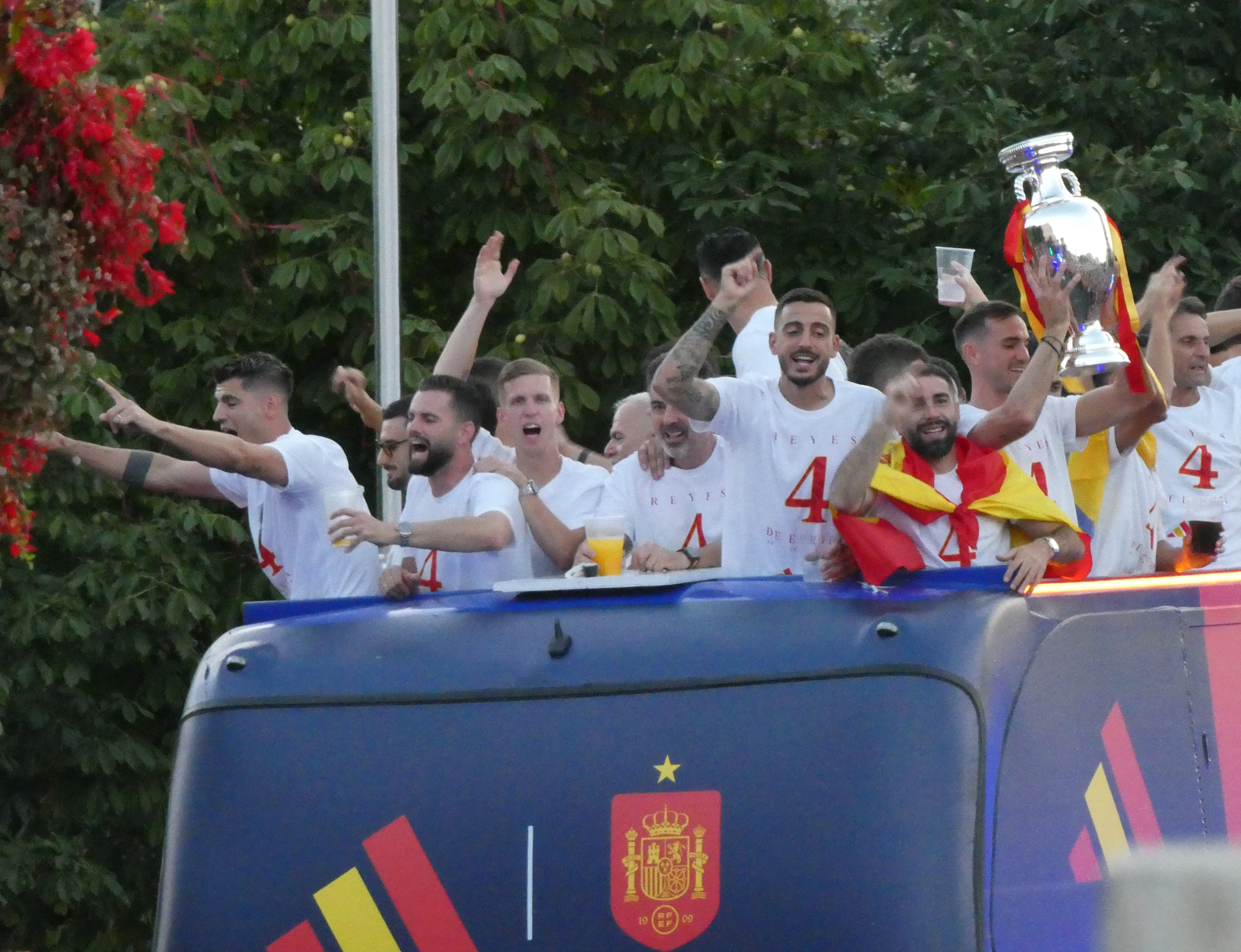
Spain, UEFA Euro 2024 winners

Spain held possession of ball more than their opponents in all matches from 2008 to 2024, a record of 136 games.

We have the same idea as each other. Keep the ball, create movement around and off the ball, get in the spaces to cause danger.

— Xabi Alonso (Spanish midfielder)

=== Kits and crest ===
Spain's home kit is traditionally a red jersey with yellow trim, dark blue shorts, and black socks, whilst their current away kit is predominantly yellow, having been white traditionally. The color of the home socks started to alter throughout the 1990s from black to the same blue color as the shorts, then matching either the blue of the shorts or the red of the shirt until the mid-2010s when they returned to their traditional black before continuing the rotation in the 2020s. Spain's kits have been produced by manufacturers including Adidas (from 1981 until 1983), Le Coq Sportif (from 1984 until 1990) and Adidas once again (since 1991). Rather than displaying the logo of the Spanish Football Federation, Spain's jersey traditionally features the country's coat of arms over the left side. After winning the 2010 World Cup, the World Cup winners badge was added to the right side of the jersey and a golden star at the top of Spain's coat of arms. A second gold star was added after their victory at the 2026 FIFA World Cup.

==== Kit suppliers ====
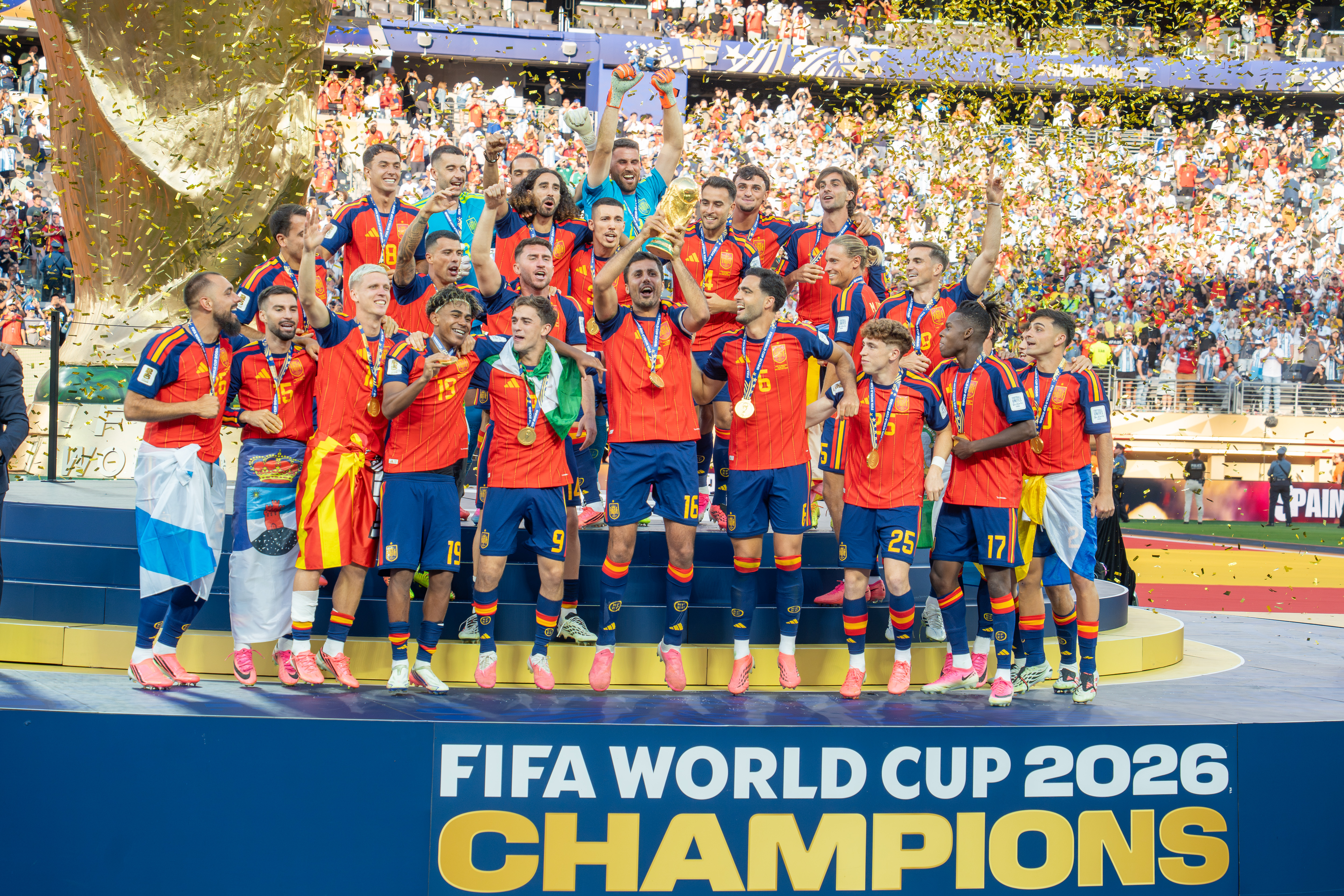
Spain, 2026 FIFA World Cup winners

Kit supplier	Period	Notes
None	1920–1935	
(Spain) Deportes Cóndor	1935–1966	
(England) Umbro	1966	
(Spain) Deportes Cóndor	1967–1981	
(West Germany) Adidas	1981–1983	
(France) Le Coq Sportif	1984–1990	
(Germany) Adidas	1991–present	Current until 2030

=== Home stadium ===
Spain does not have a designated national stadium. The capital city of Madrid (Bernabéu and Metropolitano), Seville (Pizjuán, Villamarín and La Cartuja), Valencia (Mestalla and Orriols) and Barcelona (Camp Nou and Montjuïc), are the four Spanish cities that have hosted more than 15 national team matches, while also being home to the largest stadiums in the country.

Other friendly matches, as well as qualifying fixtures against smaller opponents, are played in provincial stadia. The 2018 FIFA World Cup qualification campaign included matches at the Reino de León in León, Los Cármenes in Granada, El Molinón in Gijón, and the Rico Pérez in Alicante.

=== Media coverage ===
Spain's UEFA Nations League, UEFA European Qualifiers and all friendly matches, are televised nationwide by La 1, flagship television channel of the public broadcaster TVE.

== Rivalries ==
Spain has rivalries with seven countries, four of them being Europe's "Big Five" nations and the others with its Iberian neighbour Portugal, the Netherlands, and its southern neighbour Morocco.

- Their rivalry with Italy, sometimes referred to as the "Mediterranean derby", has been contested since 1920. Their first meeting was at the Olympic Games, in a 2–0 triumph for Spain on 2 September 1920 in Antwerp. Although the two nations are not immediate geographical neighbours, their rivalry at international level is enhanced by the strong performances of the representative clubs in UEFA competitions, in which they are among the leading associations and have each enjoyed spells of dominance. Since the quarter-final match between the two countries at Euro 2008, the rivalry has renewed, with its most notable match between the two sides being in the UEFA Euro 2012 final, which Spain won 4–0. Spain has the advantage in the head-to-head, with 14 wins, 16 draws, and 11 losses, after 41 games, but both teams evenly split with 6 wins each when only competitive matches are counted.
- Their rivalry with Portugal, also known as the "Iberian derby", has been contested since 1921. Their first meeting was a 3–1 triumph for Spain on 18 December 1921 in Madrid, the first ever international game for the Portuguese. Portugal had first draw in 1926, and their first win (4–1) in 1947. In this friendly rivalry, Spain dominates the head-to-head record with 18 victories, 18 draws, and 6 losses, after 42 games. They also lead Portugal in competitive matches, with 6 wins to Portugal's 1 with 6 draws. Their last competitive match resulted in a 1–0 win for Spain during the 2026 FIFA World Cup round of 16.
- Their rivalry with France, sometimes referred to as the "Pyrenean derby", has been contested since 1922. Their first meeting was a 4–0 triumph for Spain on 30 April 1922 in Bordeaux, though their first competitive meeting came in the UEFA Euro 1984 final, which France won to receive their first international trophy. Spain has the advantage in the head-to-head, with 19 wins, 7 draws, and 13 losses, after 37 games. France has a slight advantage in competitive matches, with 6 wins compared to 5 of Spain. However, Spain leads in the 21st century, with 10 victories out of 14 matches between both teams, including defeats for France in the semi-finals of the last three major tournaments – 2024 UEFA Euro, 2025 UEFA Nations League and 2026 FIFA World Cup – earning the Spanish side the nickname of France's "Bête Noire".
- Their rivalry with England has been contested since 1929. Their first meeting was a 4–3 victory for Spain on 15 May 1929 in Madrid, the first ever English defeat outside the British Isles. The first of their nine competitive fixtures came at the 1950 World Cup in Maracanã, where Spain won 1–0 with a Telmo Zarra legendary goal. In another World Cup meeting in 1982, Spain received England as hosts at the Bernabéu, in a second round stage match ended 0–0. One year before, in 1981, Spain achieved its first victory at Wembley Stadium. At the European Championship, they have met three times. In 1980, England won 2–1, sixteen years before a quarter-final at Wembley ended 0–0 after extra time, with England advancing on penalties. At the UEFA Euro 2024 final, as England were aiming to win their first European title, the Spaniards won 2–1 in Berlin, clinching a record fourth Euros. The head-to-head result for Spain is 12 wins, 4 draws and 14 losses, after 30 games. Their most recent meeting was on 15 November 2026, Spain lost to England 3–2, ending Spain's 43 match unbeaten record.
- Their rivalry with Germany has been contested since 1935. Their first meeting was a 2–1 victory for Spain on 12 May 1935 in Cologne. Spain met a German side for the first time in a competitive fixture in 1966, as part of the 1966 World Cup, where West Germany (competing separately from East Germany at the time) came back to win 2–1. Since the German reunification in 1990, Spain has remained undefeated in competitive fixtures against Germany, winning 1–0 the UEFA Euro 2008 final, 0–1 the 2010 World Cup semi-final, 6–0 in the 2020–21 Nations League, and most recently in the Euro 2024 quarter-finals, 2–1 against the hosts after extra-time. The head-to-head result is a tie with 9 wins each and 9 draws, after 27 games.
- Their rivalry with the Netherlands, is one that has developed in recent years. Their first significant meeting came in the “final” of the 1920 Summer Olympics, where Spain defeated the Dutch 3–1 to win their first silverware in history. The team would meet again in another final 90 years later, this at the 2010 FIFA World Cup. In a very heated contest, marked by many fouls by the Dutch side, Spain would win their first ever World Cup. Spain and the Netherlands would not see each other again until four years later in the group stage of the 2014 FIFA World Cup; in a rematch of the 2010 final, the Dutch handed Spain their biggest defeat in 60 years as they won 5–1. Their next competitive game came in the 2025 edition of the Nations League, where Spain would go on to win the penalty shootout and eliminating the Dutch from the tournament.
- Their rivalry with Morocco has also developed in recent years, although not seen as intense or important as their rivalry with France, Italy and Portugal. Many people from Spain and the media do not consider Morocco rivals and this is mostly seen as a one sided rivalry. But the existence are for reasons related to both sporting and non-sporting matters. Before the 21st century, both teams had only met in two competitive matches in the 1962 World Cup qualification, with Spain winning both matches. It would not be until the 2018 FIFA World Cup that both teams would meet again in an official match after being placed together in the same group, with their match ending in a 2–2 draw which helped Spain sealed the top of the group and eliminating Morocco. Four years later, in the 2022 FIFA World Cup, both teams met again in the round of 16, resulting in Morocco eliminating Spain in the penalty shootout. Both countries, along with Portugal, will serve as hosts for the 2030 FIFA World Cup, with conflict arising over who should host the final match.

== Results and fixtures ==
The following is a list of match results in the last 12 months, as well as any future matches that have been scheduled.

Win Draw Loss Fixture

=== 2026 ===
27 March Friendly	Spain	3–0	Serbia	Villarreal, Spain
21:00 CET	Oyarzabal 16', 44'; Muñoz 72'	Report		Stadium: Estadio de la Ceramica; Attendance: 20,482; Referee: Luis Godinho (Portugal)

31 March Friendly	Spain	0–0	Egypt	Cornellà de Llobregat, Spain (Note: The Egypt vs. Spain match, originally scheduled to be played at the Lusail Stadium in Lusail, Qatar, was relocated to Spain due to the 2026 Iran war.)
21:00 CEST		Report		Stadium: RCDE Stadium; Attendance: 35,895; Referee: Georgi Kabakov (Bulgaria)

4 June Friendly	Spain	1–1	Iraq	A Coruña, Spain
21:00 CEST	Torres 16'	Report	Doski 27'	Stadium: Estadio Riazor; Attendance: 30,423; Referee: Florian Badstübner (Germany)

8 June Friendly	Peru	1–3	Spain	Puebla, Mexico
20:00 CST	Vélez 66'	Report	Oyarzabal 2'; Pedri 32'; Gallese 55' (o.g.)	Stadium: Estadio Cuauhtémoc; Attendance: 45,845; Referee: Fernando Hernández (Mexico)

15 June 2026 FIFA World Cup Group H	Spain	0–0	Cape Verde	Atlanta, United States
12:00 EDT		Report		Stadium: Mercedes-Benz Stadium; Attendance: 67,640; Referee: Adham Makhadmeh (Jordan)

21 June 2026 FIFA World Cup Group H	Spain	4–0	Saudi Arabia	Atlanta, United States
12:00 EDT	Yamal 10'; Oyarzabal 21', 24'; Al-Tambakti 49' (o.g.)	Report		Stadium: Mercedes-Benz Stadium; Attendance: 68,239; Referee: Raphael Claus (Brazil)

26 June 2026 FIFA World Cup Group H	Uruguay	0–1	Spain	Zapopan, Mexico
18:00 MDT		Report	Baena 42'	Stadium: Estadio Akron; Attendance: 45,065; Referee: Ismail Elfath (United States)

2 July 2026 FIFA World Cup Round of 32	Spain	3–0	Austria	Inglewood, United States
12:00 PDT	Oyarzabal 36', 89'; Porro 66'	Report		Stadium: SoFi Stadium; Attendance: 70,492; Referee: Glenn Nyberg (Sweden)

6 July 2026 FIFA World Cup Round of 16	Portugal	0–1	Spain	Arlington, United States
14:00 CDT		Report	Merino 90+1'	Stadium: AT&T Stadium; Attendance: 70,649; Referee: Anthony Taylor (England)

10 July 2026 FIFA World Cup Quarterfinal	Spain	2–1	Belgium	Inglewood, United States
12:00 PDT	Fabián 30'; Merino 88'	Report	De Ketelaere 41'	Stadium: SoFi Stadium; Attendance: 70,492; Referee: Michael Oliver (England)

14 July 2026 FIFA World Cup Semifinal	France	0–2	Spain	Arlington, United States
14:00 CDT		Report	Oyarzabal 22' (pen.); Porro 58'	Stadium: AT&T Stadium; Attendance: 70,176; Referee: Iván Barton (El Salvador)

19 July 2026 FIFA World Cup Final	Spain	1–0 (a.e.t.)	Argentina	East Rutherford, United States
15:00 CDT	Torres 106'	Report		Stadium: MetLife Stadium; Attendance: 80,663; Referee: Slavko Vinčić (Slovenia)

26 September 2026–27 UEFA Nations League	England	2–3	Spain	London, England
19:45 UTC+1	Gordon 36'; Kane 40'	Report	Yamal 2'; Baena 60'; Oyarzabal 74'	Stadium: Wembley Stadium; Attendance: 84,525; Referee: Davide Massa (Italy)

29 September 2026–27 UEFA Nations League	Spain	4–1	Croatia	Seville, Spain
20:45 UTC+2	Yamal 2', 63'; Pubill 31'; Williams 89'	Report	Beljo 28'	Stadium: Estadio Ramón Sánchez-Pizjuán; Attendance: 40,294; Referee: Serdar Gözübüyük (Netherlands)

3 October 2026–27 UEFA Nations League	Spain	3–1	Czech Republic	Oviedo, Spain
20:45 UTC+2	Yamal 6'; Rodri 35'; Merino 89'	Report	Sláma 69'	Stadium: Estadio Carlos Tartiere; Attendance: 28,515; Referee: Vassilis Fotias (Greece)

6 October 2026–27 UEFA Nations League	Croatia	1–2	Spain	Split, Croatia
20:45 UTC+2	Perišić 17'	Report	Merino 61', 88'	Stadium: Stadion Poljud; Attendance: 32,690; Referee: Erik Lambrechts (Belgium)

12 November 2026–27 UEFA Nations League	Czech Republic	0–2	Spain	Prague, Czech Republic
20:45 UTC+1		Report	Baena 39' (pen.); Pubill 90+6'	Stadium: Fortuna Arena; Attendance: 18,193; Referee: Nikola Dabanović (Montenegro)

15 November 2026–27 UEFA Nations League	Spain	2–3	England	Madrid, Spain
20:45 UTC+1	Oyarzabal 65' (pen.); Williams 75'	Report	Kane 45' (pen.); Konsa 53'; White 57'	Stadium: Estadio Metropolitano; Attendance: 63,788; Referee: Clément Turpin (France)

=== 2027 ===
25 March 2026–27 Nations League QF 1st Leg	Spain	v	France	Spain
--:-- UTC+1		Report

28 March 2026–27 Nations League QF 2nd Leg	France	v	Spain	TBC
--:--		Report

== Coaching staff ==
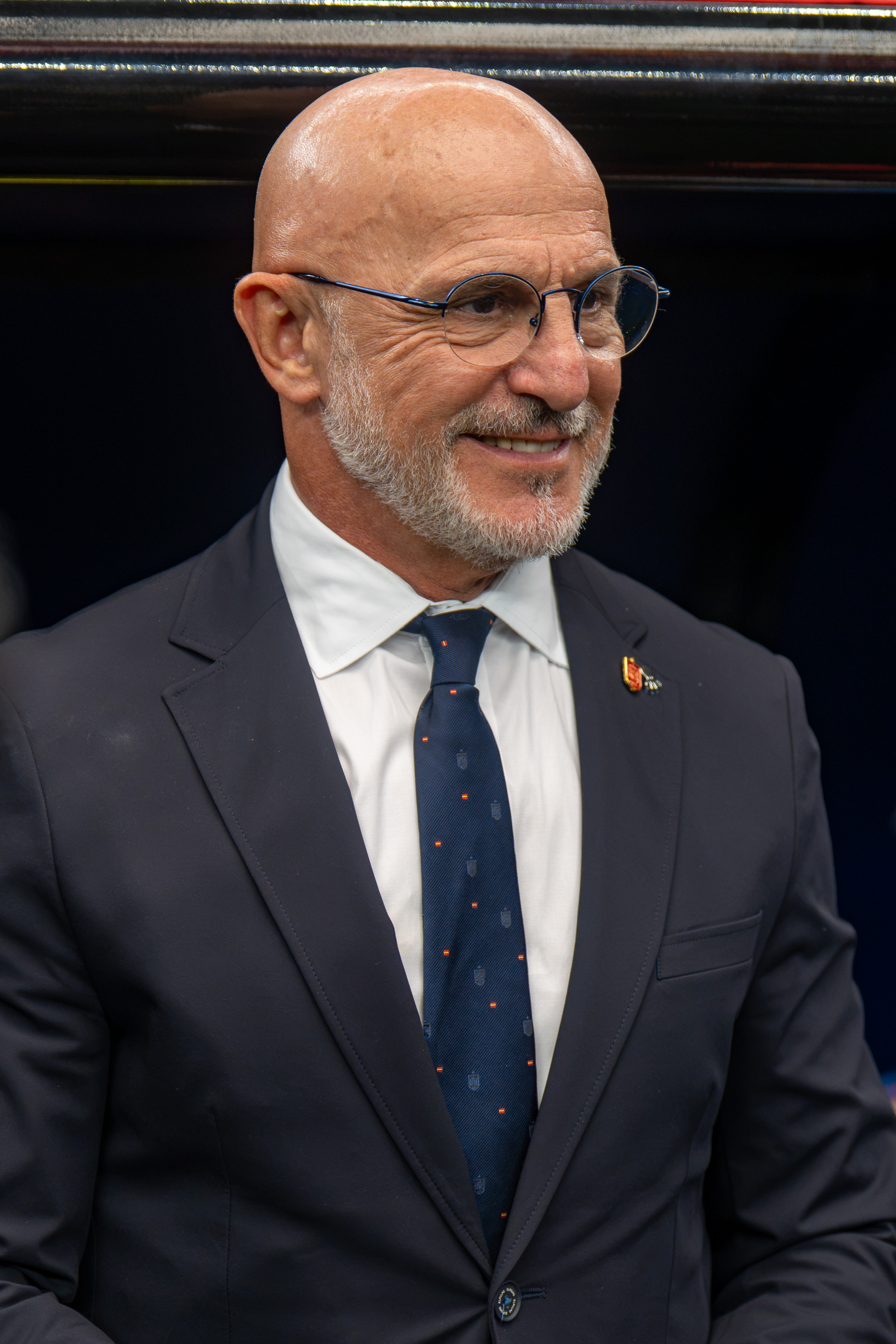
Current head coach Luis de la Fuente

Role	Name
Head coach	(Spain) Luis de la Fuente
Assistant coach	(Spain) Juanjo González
Goalkeeping coach	(Spain) Miguel Ángel España
Fitness coach	(Spain) Carlos Alberto Cruz
Chief analyst	(Spain) Pablo Peña
Sporting director	(Spain) Aitor Karanka

== Players ==
=== Current squad ===
The following 28 players were named in the squad for the 2026–27 UEFA Nations League A matches against the Czech Republic and England on 12 and 15 November 2026, respectively.
Caps and goals updated as of 15 November 2026, after the match against England.

No.	Pos.	Player	Date of birth (age)	Caps	Goals	Club
1	GK	David Raya	15 September 1995 (age 31)	14	0	(The Football Association) Arsenal
13	GK	Joan Garcia	4 May 2001 (age 25)	2	0	(Royal Spanish Football Federation) Barcelona
23	GK	Unai Simón (captain)	11 June 1997 (age 29)	71	0	(Royal Spanish Football Federation) Athletic Bilbao
	GK	Álvaro Valles	25 July 1997 (age 29)	0	0	(Royal Spanish Football Federation) Real Betis
2	DF	Marc Pubill	20 June 2003 (age 23)	8	2	(Royal Spanish Football Federation) Atlético Madrid
4	DF	Dean Huijsen	14 April 2005 (age 21)	10	0	(Royal Spanish Football Federation) Real Madrid
5	DF	Pau Cubarsí	22 January 2007 (age 19)	25	0	(Royal Spanish Football Federation) Barcelona
12	DF	Pedro Porro	14 September 1999 (age 27)	26	2	(The Football Association) Tottenham Hotspur
14	DF	Aymeric Laporte	27 May 1994 (age 32)	58	2	(Royal Spanish Football Federation) Athletic Bilbao
22	DF	Marc Cucurella	22 July 1998 (age 28)	37	1	(Royal Spanish Football Federation) Real Madrid
	DF	Álex Grimaldo	20 September 1995 (age 31)	14	0	(Royal Spanish Football Federation) Atlético Madrid
	DF	Jacobo Ramón	6 January 2005 (age 21)	0	0	(Italian Football Federation) Como
3	MF	Marc Roca	26 November 1996 (age 29)	0	0	(Royal Spanish Football Federation) Real Betis
6	MF	Mikel Merino	22 June 1996 (age 30)	57	15	(The Football Association) Arsenal
8	MF	Fabián Ruiz	3 April 1996 (age 30)	54	7	(French Football Federation) Paris Saint-Germain
9	MF	Fermín López	11 May 2003 (age 23)	12	0	(Royal Spanish Football Federation) Barcelona
11	MF	Yeremy Pino	20 October 2002 (age 24)	28	4	(The Football Association) Crystal Palace
15	MF	Álex Baena	20 July 2001 (age 25)	30	5	(Royal Spanish Football Federation) Atlético Madrid
16	MF	Pablo Barrios	15 June 2003 (age 23)	4	0	(Royal Spanish Football Federation) Atlético Madrid
18	MF	Martín Zubimendi	2 February 1999 (age 27)	32	3	(The Football Association) Arsenal
19	MF	Víctor Muñoz	13 July 2003 (age 23)	5	1	(The Football Association) Liverpool
20	MF	Pedri	25 November 2002 (age 23)	55	6	(Royal Spanish Football Federation) Barcelona
	MF	Jorge de Frutos	20 February 1997 (age 29)	2	0	(Royal Spanish Football Federation) Rayo Vallecano
7	FW	Ferran Torres	29 February 2000 (age 26)	67	25	(French Football Federation) Paris Saint-Germain
10	FW	Lamine Yamal	13 July 2007 (age 19)	38	11	(Royal Spanish Football Federation) Barcelona
17	FW	Nico Williams	12 July 2002 (age 24)	39	8	(Royal Spanish Football Federation) Athletic Bilbao
21	FW	Mikel Oyarzabal	21 April 1997 (age 29)	65	32	(Royal Spanish Football Federation) Real Sociedad
	FW	Roberto Fernández	3 July 2002 (age 24)	2	0	(Royal Spanish Football Federation) Espanyol

=== Recent call-ups ===
The following players have also been called up for the team in the last twelve months.

Pos.	Player	Date of birth (age)	Caps	Goals	Club	Latest call-up
GK	Josep Martínez	27 May 1998 (age 28)	1	0	(Italy) Inter Milan	v. Croatia, 6 October 2026
GK	Leo Román	6 July 2000 (age 26)	1	0	(Spain) Deportivo A Coruña	v. Iraq, 4 June 2026
GK	Álex Remiro	24 March 1995 (age 31)	2	0	(Spain) Real Sociedad	v. Egypt, 31 March 2026
DF	Robin Le Normand	11 November 1996 (age 30)	28	1	(Spain) Atlético Madrid	v. Croatia, 6 October 2026
DF	Fran García	14 August 1999 (age 27)	3	0	(Spain) Real Betis	v. Croatia, 6 October 2026
DF	Iván Fresneda	28 September 2004 (age 22)	1	0	(Portugal) Sporting CP	v. Croatia, 6 October 2026
DF	Eric Garcia	9 January 2001 (age 25)	22	0	(Spain) Barcelona	v. England, 26 September 2026 ^{INJ}
DF	Marcos Llorente ^{RET}	30 January 1995 (age 31)	27	0	(Spain) Atlético Madrid	2026 FIFA World Cup
DF	Jon Martín	23 April 2006 (age 20)	1	0	(Spain) Real Sociedad	v. Iraq, 4 June 2026
DF	Javi Rodríguez	26 June 2003 (age 23)	1	0	(Spain) Celta Vigo	v. Iraq, 4 June 2026
DF	Cristhian Mosquera	27 June 2004 (age 22)	2	0	(England) Arsenal	v. Egypt, 31 March 2026
MF	Rodri	22 June 1996 (age 30)	74	5	(Spain) Barcelona	v. Croatia, 6 October 2026
MF	Dani Olmo	7 May 1998 (age 28)	61	12	(Spain) Barcelona	v. Croatia, 6 October 2026
MF	Gavi	5 August 2004 (age 22)	32	5	(Spain) Barcelona	2026 FIFA World Cup
MF	Sergio Gómez	4 September 2000 (age 26)	2	0	(Spain) Real Sociedad	v. Iraq, 4 June 2026
MF	Jesús Rodríguez	21 November 2005 (age 20)	2	0	(Italy) Como	v. Iraq, 4 June 2026
MF	Marc Bernal	26 May 2007 (age 19)	1	0	(Spain) Barcelona	v. Iraq, 4 June 2026
MF	Javi Guerra	13 May 2003 (age 23)	1	0	(Spain) Valencia	v. Iraq, 4 June 2026
MF	Beñat Turrientes	31 January 2002 (age 24)	1	0	(Spain) Real Sociedad	v. Iraq, 4 June 2026
MF	Carlos Soler	2 January 1997 (age 29)	15	4	(Spain) Real Sociedad	v. Egypt, 31 March 2026
MF	Pablo Fornals	2 February 1996 (age 30)	9	1	(Spain) Real Betis	v. Egypt, 31 March 2026
FW	Ander Barrenetxea	27 December 2001 (age 24)	1	0	(Spain) Real Sociedad	v. Czech Republic, 12 November 2026 ^{INJ}
FW	Carlos Espí	24 July 2005 (age 21)	0	0	(Spain) Real Madrid	v. Croatia, 6 October 2026
FW	Borja Iglesias	17 January 1993 (age 33)	9	0	(Spain) Celta Vigo	2026 FIFA World Cup
FW	Gonzalo García	24 March 2004 (age 22)	1	0	(England) Fulham	v. Iraq, 4 June 2026
^{INJ} Player withdrew from the squad due to an injury^{PRE} Preliminary squad / standby^{WD} Player withdrew from the squad due to non-injury issue^{RET} Player retired from the national team^{SUS} Player is serving suspension

== Individual records ==
=== Player records ===
Sergio Ramos holds the record for most appearances for the Spain's team with 180. In second place is Iker Casillas with 167, followed by Sergio Busquets with 143.

David Villa holds the title of Spain's highest goalscorer, scoring 59 goals from 2005 to 2017, during which time he played for Spain on 98 occasions. Raúl González is the second highest goalscorer, scoring 44 goals in 102 appearances between 1996 and 2006.

==== Most appearances ====
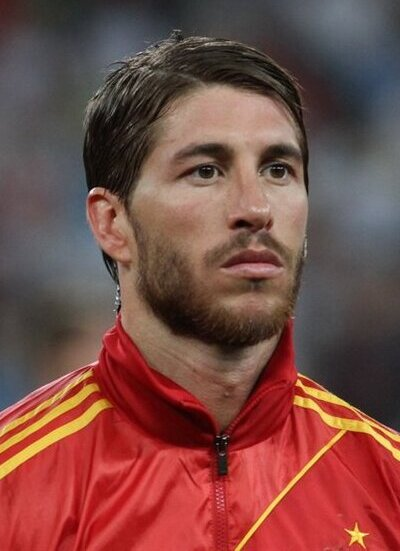
Sergio Ramos holds the record for the most appearances in the history of Spain with 180 caps.

Below is a list of the ten players with the most caps for Spain, as of 19 July 2026.

Players in bold are still active with Spain.

Rank	Player	Caps	Goals	Period
1	Sergio Ramos	180	23	2005–2021
2	Iker Casillas	167	0	2000–2016
3	Sergio Busquets	143	2	2009–2022
4	Xavi	133	13	2000–2014
5	Andrés Iniesta	131	13	2006–2018
6	Andoni Zubizarreta	126	0	1985–1998
7	David Silva	125	35	2006–2018
8	Xabi Alonso	114	16	2003–2014
9	Cesc Fàbregas	110	15	2006–2016
9	Fernando Torres	110	38	2003–2014

Youngest capped player

- Lamine Yamal (16 years and 57 days) vs. Georgia, 8 September 2023

Oldest capped player

- Jesús Navas (38 years and 231 days) vs. France, 9 July 2024

==== Top goalscorers ====
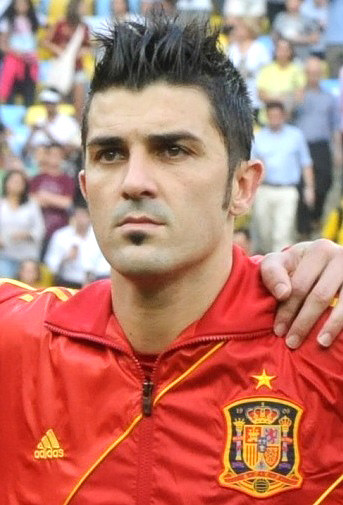
David Villa is Spain's all-time leading goalscorer with 59 goals.

Below is a list of the top ten goalscorers for Spain, as of 15 November 2026.

Rank	Player	Goals	Caps	Average	Period
1	David Villa (list)	59	98	0.6	2005–2017
2	Raúl (list)	44	102	0.43	1996–2006
3	Fernando Torres (list)	38	110	0.35	2003–2014
4	Álvaro Morata	37	87	0.43	2014–2025
5	David Silva	35	125	0.28	2006–2018
6	**Mikel Oyarzabal**	32	65	0.49	2016–present
7	Fernando Hierro	29	89	0.33	1989–2002
8	Fernando Morientes	27	47	0.57	1998–2007
9	Emilio Butragueño	26	69	0.38	1984–1992
10	**Ferran Torres**	25	67	0.37	2020–present

Youngest goalscorer

- Lamine Yamal (16 years and 57 days) vs. Georgia, 8 September 2023

Oldest goalscorer

- Aritz Aduriz (35 years and 274 days) vs. Macedonia, 12 November 2016

Most goals scored in a single match

- Chacho (6 goals) vs. Bulgaria, 13 May 1933

First goal scored

- Juan Arzuaga vs. France, 25 May 1913 (unofficial game)
- Patricio Arabolaza vs. Denmark, 28 August 1920 (official game)

=== Captains ===
List of Spain's captains in major tournaments.

- Mariano Arrate (3 caps as captain) was captain during the 1920 Summer Olympics.
- Pedro Vallana (5) was captain during the 1924 Summer Olympics and 1928 Summer Olympics.
- Ricardo Zamora (24) was captain during the 1934 FIFA World Cup.
- Ignacio Eizaguirre (4) was captain during the 1950 FIFA World Cup.
- Joan Segarra (15) was captain during the 1962 FIFA World Cup.
- Ferran Olivella (10) was captain during the 1964 European Nations' Cup.
- Francisco Gento (15) was captain during the 1966 FIFA World Cup.
- Pirri (18) was captain during the 1978 FIFA World Cup.
- Juan Manuel Asensi (14) was captain during the UEFA Euro 1980.
- Luis Arconada (48) was captain during the 1982 FIFA World Cup and UEFA Euro 1984.
- José Antonio Camacho (24) was captain during the 1986 FIFA World Cup and UEFA Euro 1988.
- Emilio Butragueño (31) was captain during the 1990 FIFA World Cup.
- Andoni Zubizarreta (50) was captain during the 1994 FIFA World Cup, Euro 1996 and the 1998 FIFA World Cup.
- Fernando Hierro (32) was captain during Euro 2000 and the 2002 FIFA World Cup.
- Raúl (42) was captain during Euro 2004 and the 2006 FIFA World Cup.
- Iker Casillas (104) was captain during Euro 2008, the 2009 FIFA Confederations Cup, the 2010 FIFA World Cup, Euro 2012, the 2013 FIFA Confederations Cup, the 2014 FIFA World Cup and Euro 2016.
- Sergio Ramos (54) was captain during the 2018 FIFA World Cup.
- Sergio Busquets (20) was captain during Euro 2020, the 2021 UEFA Nations League Finals and the 2022 FIFA World Cup.
- Jordi Alba (5) was captain during the 2023 UEFA Nations League Finals.
- Álvaro Morata (19) was captain during Euro 2024 and the 2025 UEFA Nations League Finals.
- Rodri (8) was captain during the 2026 FIFA World Cup.

=== Manager records ===
- Most manager appearances

Vicente del Bosque: 114

== Team records ==
From March 2024 to November 2026, Spain recorded a 43 match world record undefeated streak.

Spain's undefeated streak record
Win Draw Defeat
M	Opponent	Result	Event
1	Brazil	3–3	Friendly
2	Andorra	5–0	Friendly
3	Northern Ireland	5–1	Friendly
4	Croatia	3–0	(Germany) Euro 2024
5	Italy	1–0	(Germany) Euro 2024
6	Albania	1–0	(Germany) Euro 2024
7	Georgia	4–1	(Germany) Euro 2024
8	Germany	2–1	(Germany) Euro 2024
9	France	2–1	(Germany) Euro 2024
10	England	2–1	(Germany) Euro 2024
11	Serbia	0–0	Nations League
12	Switzerland	4–1	Nations League
13	Denmark	1–0	Nations League
14	Serbia	3–0	Nations League
15	Denmark	2–1	Nations League
16	Switzerland	3–2	Nations League
17	Netherlands	2–2	Nations League
18	Netherlands	3–3 (a.e.t.) (5–4 p)	Nations League
19	France	5–4	(Germany) Nations League Finals
20	Portugal	2–2 (a.e.t.) (3–5 p)	(Germany) Nations League Finals
21	Bulgaria	3–0	2026 WCQ
22	Turkey	6–0	2026 WCQ
23	Georgia	2–0	2026 WCQ
24	Bulgaria	4–0	2026 WCQ
25	Georgia	4–0	2026 WCQ
26	Turkey	2–2	2026 WCQ
27	Serbia	3–0	Friendly
28	Egypt	0–0	Friendly
29	Iraq	1–1	Friendly
30	Peru	3–1	Friendly
31	Cape Verde	0–0	(Canada) (Mexico) (United States) 2026 World Cup
32	Saudi Arabia	4–0	(Canada) (Mexico) (United States) 2026 World Cup
33	Uruguay	1–0	(Canada) (Mexico) (United States) 2026 World Cup
34	Austria	3–0	(Canada) (Mexico) (United States) 2026 World Cup
35	Portugal	1–0	(Canada) (Mexico) (United States) 2026 World Cup
36	Belgium	2–1	(Canada) (Mexico) (United States) 2026 World Cup
37	France	2–0	(Canada) (Mexico) (United States) 2026 World Cup
38	Argentina	1–0 (a.e.t.)	(Canada) (Mexico) (United States) 2026 World Cup
39	England	3–2	Nations League
40	Croatia	4–1	Nations League
41	Czech Republic	3–1	Nations League
42	Croatia	2–1	Nations League
43	Czech Republic	2–0	Nations League

- Most consecutive wins achieved by an international coach from debut: 13 – Vicente del Bosque
- Most penalty shoot-outs in one World Cup by one team: 2 at the 2002 FIFA World Cup (shared with Argentina at the 1990 FIFA World Cup, Netherlands and Costa Rica at the 2014 FIFA World Cup, Russia and Croatia at the 2018 FIFA World Cup, and Croatia and Argentina at the 2022 FIFA World Cup)
- Highest maximum number of points in World Cup qualification: 30 out of 30 (2010) (shared with Germany for 2018)

== Competitive record ==
=== FIFA World Cup ===
Although often entering tournaments as one of the favorites, Spain have sometimes been perceived as underachieving at the World Cup. Spain's first World Cup was in 1934; at that tournament, their campaign started by defeating Brazil 3–1 to advance to the quarter-finals, where they lost to hosts Italy in a replay. Before Spain's success in 2010, their best result came in 1950, where they reached the last four. Spain were paired with the hosts Brazil, as well as Uruguay and Sweden. Spain managed a draw against Uruguay but defeats from Brazil and Sweden meant that Spain would end up in fourth place. At the 2010 FIFA World Cup held in South Africa, Spain became world champions for the first time after defeating the Netherlands 1–0 in the final, becoming the eighth country to win the World Cup.

Sixteen years after their victory in South Africa, Spain would reach their second final in history at the 2026 FIFA World Cup, where they went on to win 1–0 against Argentina.

Champions Runners-up Third place Hosts or co-hosts

FIFA World Cup record										Qualification record					
Year	Result	Position	Pld	W	D	L	GF	GA	Squad	Pld	W	D	L	GF	GA
(Uruguay) 1930	Did not enter									Did not enter					
(Italy) 1934	Quarter-finals	5th	3	1	1	1	4	3	Squad	2	2	0	0	11	1
(France) 1938	Withdrew									Withdrew					
(Brazil) 1950	Fourth place (Note: No semi-finals or third place match was played. Instead this was a round robin final group stage.)	4th	6	3	1	2	10	12	Squad	2	1	1	0	7	3
(Switzerland) 1954	Did not qualify									3	1	1	1	6	4
(Sweden) 1958	Did not qualify									4	2	1	1	12	8
(Chile) 1962	Group stage	13th	3	1	0	2	2	3	Squad	4	3	1	0	7	4
(England) 1966	Group stage	10th	3	1	0	2	4	5	Squad	3	2	0	1	5	2
(Mexico) 1970	Did not qualify									6	2	2	2	10	6
(West Germany) 1974	Did not qualify									5	2	2	1	8	6
(Argentina) 1978	Group stage	10th	3	1	1	1	2	2	Squad	4	3	0	1	4	1
(Spain) 1982	Second group stage	12th	5	1	2	2	4	5	Squad	Qualified as hosts					
(Mexico) 1986	Quarter-finals	7th	5	3	1	1	11	4	Squad	6	4	0	2	9	8
(Italy) 1990	Round of 16	10th	4	2	1	1	6	4	Squad	8	6	1	1	20	3
(United States) 1994	Quarter-finals	8th	5	2	2	1	10	6	Squad	12	8	3	1	27	4
(France) 1998	Group stage	17th	3	1	1	1	8	4	Squad	10	8	2	0	26	6
(South Korea) (Japan) 2002	Quarter-finals	5th	5	3	2	0	10	5	Squad	8	6	2	0	21	4
(Germany) 2006	Round of 16	9th	4	3	0	1	9	4	Squad	12	6	6	0	25	5
(South Africa) 2010	Champions	1st	7	6	0	1	8	2	Squad	10	10	0	0	28	5
(Brazil) 2014	Group stage	23rd	3	1	0	2	4	7	Squad	8	6	2	0	14	3
(Russia) 2018	Round of 16	10th	4	1	3	0	7	6	Squad	10	9	1	0	36	3
(Qatar) 2022	Round of 16	13th	4	1	2	1	9	3	Squad	8	6	1	1	15	5
(Canada) (Mexico) (United States) 2026	Champions	1st	8	7	1	0	14	1	Squad	6	5	1	0	21	2
(Morocco) (Portugal) (Spain) 2030	Qualified as co-hosts									Qualified as co-hosts					
(Saudi Arabia) 2034	To be determined									To be determined					
Total	2 Titles	17/23	75	38	18	19	122	76	—	131	92	27	12	312	83

Spain's World Cup history
First match	Spain 3–1 Brazil (27 May 1934; Genoa, Italy)
Biggest win	Spain 7–0 Costa Rica (23 November 2022; Doha, Qatar)
Biggest defeat	Brazil 6–1 Spain (13 July 1950; Rio de Janeiro, Brazil)
Best result	Champions (2010, 2026)
Worst result	Group stage (1962, 1966, 1978, 1998, 2014)

=== UEFA European Championship ===
Spain have won the most UEFA European Championships, with four titles. La Roja are also the only nation to date to have won consecutive championships. They have hosted the tournament once, in 1964 (one city was used to host games at Euro 2020) and have appeared in a total of twelve tournaments.

The team won their first international trophy on home soil in 1964, defeating the Soviet Union 2–1. Spain would reach the final twenty years later in 1984, where they would lose the final to France. Spain would not reach the final again until 2008, where they would defeat Germany 1–0. Four years later, Spain earned back-to-back titles, comprehensively defeating Italy 4–0 in the final in Kyiv.

It would take La Roja twelve years to reach another European final, doing so in 2024 against England, a match they won 2–1 to stand alone as the most successful national team in the competition's history with four titles, while at the same time becoming the first team ever to win all seven matches in a single tournament.

UEFA European Championship record										Qualifying record					
Year	Result	Position	Pld	W	D	L	GF	GA	Squad	Pld	W	D	L	GF	GA
(France) 1960	Withdrew									2	2	0	0	7	2
(Spain) 1964	Champions	1st	2	2	0	0	4	2	Squad	6	4	1	1	16	5
(Italy) 1968	Did not qualify									8	3	2	3	7	5
(Belgium) 1972	Did not qualify									6	3	2	1	14	3
(Socialist Federal Republic of Yugoslavia) 1976	Did not qualify									8	3	4	1	11	9
(Italy) 1980	Group stage	7th	3	0	1	2	2	4	Squad	6	4	1	1	13	5
(France) 1984	Runners-up	2nd	5	1	3	1	4	5	Squad	8	6	1	1	24	8
(West Germany) 1988	Group stage	6th	3	1	0	2	3	5	Squad	6	5	0	1	14	6
(Sweden) 1992	Did not qualify									7	3	0	4	17	12
(England) 1996	Quarter-finals	6th	4	1	3	0	4	3	Squad	10	8	2	0	25	4
(Belgium) (Netherlands) 2000	Quarter-finals	5th	4	2	0	2	7	7	Squad	8	7	0	1	42	5
(Portugal) 2004	Group stage	10th	3	1	1	1	2	2	Squad	10	7	2	1	21	5
(Austria) (Switzerland) 2008	Champions	1st	6	5	1	0	12	3	Squad	12	9	1	2	23	8
(Poland) (Ukraine) 2012	Champions	1st	6	4	2	0	12	1	Squad	8	8	0	0	26	6
(France) 2016	Round of 16	10th	4	2	0	2	5	4	Squad	10	9	0	1	23	3
(Europe) 2020	Semi-finals	3rd	6	2	4	0	13	6	Squad	10	8	2	0	31	5
(Germany) 2024	Champions	1st	7	7	0	0	15	4	Squad	8	7	0	1	25	5
(United Kingdom) (Republic of Ireland) 2028	To be determined									To be determined					
(Italy) (Turkey) 2032	To be determined									To be determined					
Total	4 Titles	12/17	53	28	15	10	83	46	—	133	96	18	19	339	96

Spain's European Championship history
First match	Spain 2–1 Hungary (Madrid, Spain; 17 June 1964)
Biggest win	Spain 5–0 Slovakia (Seville, Spain; 23 June 2021)
Biggest defeat	France 2–0 Spain (Paris, France; 27 June 1984); West Germany 2–0 Spain (Munich, West Germany; 17 June 1988); Italy 2–0 Spain (Saint-Denis, France; 27 June 2016)
Best result	Champions (1964, 2008, 2012, 2024)
Worst result	Group stage (1980, 1988, 2004)

=== UEFA Nations League ===
Since the inaugural UEFA Nations League, La Roja have remained in League A and have reached the UEFA Nations League Finals on three occasions, only failing to do so in the inaugural season. At the 2021 finals, Spain won their semi-final after defeating Italy 2–1 but lost to France in the final. In the following campaign, La Roja would again reach the final thanks to another win against Italy. Spain would then beat Croatia on penalties after a 0–0 draw. Spain reached a record third consecutive final at the 2025 edition by defeating the Netherlands in the quarter-finals, and France in the semi-finals 5–4. In the first ever Iberian final, Spain faced Portugal in Munich. Despite dominating the game, Spain were unable to break through the Portuguese defense. The score ended 2–2 after 90 minutes and extra time, and Spain lost on penalties.

UEFA Nations League record
League phase / Quarter-finals												Finals								
Season	LG	Grp	Pos	Pld	W	D	L	GF	GA	P/R	IR	Year	Pld	W	D	L	GF	GA	Squad	OR
2018–19	A	4	2nd	4	2	0	2	12	7	Same position	7th	(Portugal) 2019	Did not qualify							7th
2020–21	A	4	1st	6	3	2	1	13	3	Same position	4th	(Italy) 2021	2	1	0	1	3	3	Squad	2nd
2022–23	A	2	1st	6	3	2	1	8	5	Same position	3rd	(Netherlands) 2023	2	1	1	0	2	1	Squad	1st
2024–25	A	4	1st	6	5	1	0	13	4	Same position	1st	(Germany) 2025	2	1	1	0	7	6	Squad	2nd
2024–25	A	Quarter-final		2	0	2	0	5	5	Same position	1st	(Germany) 2025	2	1	1	0	7	6	Squad	2nd
2026–27	A	3	2nd	6	5	0	1	16	8	Same position	5th	2027	To be determined							
2026–27	A	Quarter-final		0	0	0	0	0	0	Same position	5th	2027	To be determined							
Total				30	18	7	5	67	32	1st		Total Finals:3/4	6	3	2	1	12	10	1 Title	

Spain's Nations League history
First match	England 1–2 Spain (London, England; 8 September 2018)
Biggest win	Spain 6–0 Croatia (Elche, Spain; 11 September 2018); Spain 6–0 Germany (Seville, Spain; 17 November 2020)
Biggest defeat	Spain 2–3 England (Seville, Spain; 15 October 2018); Croatia 3–2 Spain (Zagreb, Croatia; 15 November 2018); Ukraine 1–0 Spain (Kyiv, Ukraine; 13 October 2020); France 2–1 Spain (Milan, Italy; 10 October 2021); Spain 1–2 Switzerland (Zaragoza, Spain; 24 September 2022); Spain 2–3 England (Madrid, Spain; 15 November 2026)
Best result	Champions (2022–23)
Worst result	7th place (2018–19)

=== CONMEBOL–UEFA Cup of Champions ===
After winning a record fourth European Championship in 2024, Spain qualified to their first ever CONMEBOL–UEFA Cup of Champions, where they were scheduled to face Argentina, the champions of the 2024 Copa América. However, the match was later cancelled after both sides could not come to an agreement as to which stadium would host the game.

CONMEBOL–UEFA Cup of Champions record
Year	Result	Position	Pld	W	D	L	GF	GA	Squad
(France) 1985	Did not qualify								
(Argentina) 1993	Did not qualify								
(England) 2022	Did not qualify								
(Qatar) 2026	Cancelled								
Total		0/3	0	0	0	0	0	0	—

=== FIFA Confederations Cup ===
Spain made two appearances at the FIFA Confederations Cup. Their first appearance came in 2009 as European champions when they won a third place medal, after losing 2–0 to the United States in the semi-finals. At the next edition, Spain qualified as both World and European champions. La Roja reached the final in Brazil, but lost 3–0 to the hosts.

FIFA Confederations Cup record
Year	Result	Position	Pld	W	D	L	GF	GA	Squad
(Saudi Arabia) 1992	UEFA did not participate								
(Saudi Arabia) 1995	Did not qualify								
(Saudi Arabia) 1997	Did not qualify								
(Mexico) 1999	Did not qualify								
(South Korea) (Japan) 2001	Did not qualify								
(France) 2003	Did not qualify								
(Germany) 2005	Did not qualify								
(South Africa) 2009	Third place	3rd	5	4	0	1	11	4	Squad
(Brazil) 2013	Runners-up	2nd	5	3	1	1	15	4	Squad
(Russia) 2017	Did not qualify								
Total	Runners-up	2/10	10	7	1	2	26	8	—

Spain's Confederations Cup history
First match	Spain 5–0 New Zealand (Rustenburg, South Africa; 14 June 2009)
Biggest win	Spain 10–0 Tahiti (Rio de Janeiro, Brazil; 20 June 2013)
Biggest defeat	Brazil 3–0 Spain (Rio de Janeiro, Brazil; 30 June 2013)
Best result	Runners-up (2013)
Worst result	Third place (2009)

=== Olympic Games ===
Rules (UEFA)

- 1900–1904: club teams
- 1908–1988: amateur / youth national teams (Note: The 1924 and 1928 editions were co-organised by FIFA.) (Note: Countries from Eastern Europe competed with professional players.)
- 1992–present: under-23 national teams

Note

- No tournament held in 1932
- The Royal Spanish Football Federation was founded in 1913. Thus from 1900–1914 Spain did not participate at Olympic tournaments.

Spain made their debut at the 1920 Summer Olympics, where they played their first ever international match, a 1–0 victory over Denmark. At the conclusion of the tournament, Spain won their first silver medal.

Olympic Games record
Year	Host city	Result	Position	Pld	W	D	L	GF	GA	Squad
1900	(France) Paris	Only club teams participated								
1904	(United States) St. Louis	Only club teams participated								
1908	(United Kingdom) London	No national representative								
1912	(Sweden) Stockholm	No national representative								
1920	(Belgium) Antwerp	Silver medal	2nd	5	4	0	1	9	5	Squad
1924	(France) Paris	First round	17th	1	0	0	1	0	1	Squad
1928	(Netherlands) Amsterdam	Quarter-finals	6th	3	1	1	1	9	9	Squad
1936	(Nazi Germany) Berlin	Withdrew								
1948–1988	See Spain national amateur football team									
Since 1992	See Spain national under-23 football team									
Total		Silver medal	3/4	9	5	1	3	18	15	—

== Honours ==
=== Global ===
- FIFA World Cup
  - Champions: 2010, 2026
- FIFA Confederations Cup
  - Runners-up: 2013
  - Third place: 2009
- Olympic Games
  - Runners-up: 1920

=== Continental ===
- UEFA European Championship
  - Champions: 1964, 2008, 2012, 2024
  - Runners-up: 1984
- UEFA Nations League
  - Champions: 2023
  - Runners-up: 2021, 2025

=== Awards ===
- FIFA Team of the Year: 2008, 2009, 2010, 2011, 2012, 2013, 2025
- Laureus World Team of the Year: 2011
- World Soccer Team of the Year: 2008, 2010, 2012, 2024
- Gazzetta Sports World Team of the Year: 2010, 2012
- Prince of Asturias Award for Sports: 2010
- FIFA World Cup Fair Play Trophy: 2006, 2010, 2018
- FIFA Confederations Cup Fair Play Award: 2013

=== Summary ===
Competition	1st place, gold medalist(s)	2nd place, silver medalist(s)	3rd place, bronze medalist(s)	Total
FIFA World Cup	2	0	0	2
FIFA Confederations Cup	0	1	1	2
Olympic Games	0	1	0	1
UEFA European Championship	4	1	0	5
UEFA Nations League	1	2	0	3
Total	7	5	1	13

== See also ==
- Spain women's national football team
- Spain national under-23 football team (Olympic football team)
- Spain national under-21 football team
- Spain national under-20 football team
- Spain national under-19 football team
- Spain national under-18 football team
- Spain national under-17 football team
- Spain national under-16 football team
- Spain national under-15 football team
- Football in Spain

== Notes ==
Achievements
Preceded by 2006 Italy	World Champions; 2010 (First title)	Succeeded by 2014 Germany
Preceded by 1960 Soviet Union	European Champions; 1964 (First title)	Succeeded by 1968 Italy
Preceded by 2004 Greece	European Champions; 2008 (Second title); 2012 (Third title)	Succeeded by 2016 Portugal
Preceded by 2020 Italy	European Champions; 2024 (Fourth title)	Succeeded by 2028

Awards
Preceded by Argentina	FIFA Team of the Year; 2008–2013	Succeeded by Germany
Preceded by Yelena Isinbayeva	Prince of Asturias Award for Sports; 2010	Succeeded by Haile Gebrselassie
Preceded by Brawn GP	Laureus Team of the Year; 2010	Succeeded by Barcelona
