= Spain national football team all-time record =

The following table show the Spain national football team's all-time international record.

== Competition records ==
=== FIFA World Cup ===
Champions Runners-up Third place Fourth place

FIFA World Cup record									Qualification record					
Year	Round	Position	Pld	W	D	L	GF	GA	Pld	W	D	L	GF	GA
(Uruguay) 1930	Did not enter								Did not enter					
(Italy) 1934	Quarter-finals	5th	3	1	1	1	4	3	2	2	0	0	11	1
(France) 1938	Did not enter								Did not enter					
(Brazil) 1950	Fourth place	4th	6	3	1	2	10	12	2	1	1	0	7	3
(Switzerland) 1954	Did not qualify								3	1	1	1	6	4
(Sweden) 1958	Did not qualify								4	2	1	1	12	8
(Chile) 1962	Group stage	13th	3	1	0	2	2	3	4	3	1	0	7	4
(England) 1966	Group stage	10th	3	1	0	2	4	5	3	2	0	1	5	2
(Mexico) 1970	Did not qualify								6	2	2	2	10	6
(West Germany) 1974	Did not qualify								5	2	2	1	8	6
(Argentina) 1978	Group stage	10th	3	1	1	1	2	2	4	3	0	1	4	1
(Spain) 1982	Second group stage	12th	5	1	2	2	4	5	Qualified as hosts					
(Mexico) 1986	Quarter-finals	7th	5	3	1	1	11	4	6	4	0	2	9	8
(Italy) 1990	Round of 16	10th	4	2	1	1	6	4	8	6	1	1	20	3
(United States) 1994	Quarter-finals	8th	5	2	2	1	10	6	12	8	3	1	27	4
(France) 1998	Group stage	17th	3	1	1	1	8	4	10	8	2	0	26	6
(South Korea) (Japan) 2002	Quarter-finals	5th	5	3	2	0	10	5	8	6	2	0	21	4
(Germany) 2006	Round of 16	9th	4	3	0	1	9	4	12	6	6	0	25	5
(South Africa) 2010	Champions	1st	7	6	0	1	8	2	10	10	0	0	28	5
(Brazil) 2014	Group stage	23rd	3	1	0	2	4	7	8	6	2	0	14	3
(Russia) 2018	Round of 16	10th	4	1	3	0	7	6	10	9	1	0	36	3
(Qatar) 2022	Round of 16	13th	4	1	2	1	9	3	8	6	1	1	15	3
(Canada) (Mexico) (United States) 2026	Champions	1st	8	7	1	0	14	1	6	5	1	0	21	2
(Morocco) (Portugal) (Spain) 2030	Qualified as co-hosts								Qualified as co-hosts					
(Saudi Arabia) 2034	TBD								TBD					
Total	2 Titles	17/23	75	38	18	19	122	76	131	92	27	12	312	83

Spain's World Cup record
First match	Spain 3–1 Brazil (27 May 1934; Genoa, Italy)
Biggest win	Spain 6–1 Bulgaria (24 June 1998; Lens, France)
Biggest defeat	Brazil 6–1 Spain (13 July 1950; Rio de Janeiro, Brazil)
Best result	Champions in 2010,2026
Worst result	Group stage in 1962, 1966, 1978, 1998, 2014

=== UEFA European Championship ===
UEFA European Championship record									Qualification record					
Year	Round	Position	Pld	W	D	L	GF	GA	Pld	W	D	L	GF	GA
(France) 1960	Did not qualify								2	2	0	0	7	2
(Spain) 1964	Champions	1st	2	2	0	0	4	2	6	4	1	1	16	5
(Italy) 1968	Did not qualify								8	3	2	3	7	5
(Belgium) 1972	Did not qualify								6	3	2	1	14	3
(Socialist Federal Republic of Yugoslavia) 1976	Did not qualify								8	3	4	1	11	9
(Italy) 1980	Group stage	7th	3	0	1	2	2	4	6	4	1	1	13	5
(France) 1984	Runners-up	2nd	5	1	3	1	4	5	8	6	1	1	24	8
(West Germany) 1988	Group stage	6th	3	1	0	2	3	5	6	5	0	1	14	6
(Sweden) 1992	Did not qualify								7	3	0	4	17	12
(England) 1996	Quarter-finals	6th	4	1	3	0	4	3	10	8	2	0	25	4
(Belgium) (Netherlands) 2000	Quarter-finals	5th	4	2	0	2	7	7	8	7	0	1	42	5
(Portugal) 2004	Group stage	10th	3	1	1	1	2	2	10	7	2	1	21	5
(Austria) (Switzerland) 2008	Champions	1st	6	5	1	0	12	3	12	9	1	2	23	8
(Poland) (Ukraine) 2012	Champions	1st	6	4	2	0	12	1	8	8	0	0	26	6
(France) 2016	Round of 16	10th	4	2	0	2	5	4	10	9	0	1	23	3
(Europe) 2020	Semi-finals	3rd	6	2	4	0	13	6	10	8	2	0	31	5
(Germany) 2024	Champions	1st	7	7	0	0	15	4	8	7	0	1	25	5
(England) (Republic of Ireland) (Scotland) (Wales) 2028	To be determined								To be determined					
(Italy) (Turkey) 2032	To be determined								To be determined					
Total	4 Titles	12/17	53	28	15	10	83	46	133	96	18	19	339	96

Spain's European Championship record
First match	Spain 2–1 Hungary (Madrid, Spain; 17 June 1964)
Biggest win	Spain 5–0 Slovakia (Seville, Spain; 23 June 2021)
Biggest defeat	France 2–0 Spain (Paris, France; 27 June 1984); West Germany 2–0 Spain (Munich, West Germany; 17 June 1988); Italy 2–0 Spain (Saint-Denis, France; 27 June 2016)
Best result	Champions in 1964, 2008, 2012, 2024
Worst result	Group stage in 1980, 1988, 2004

=== UEFA Nations League ===
UEFA Nations League record
League phase											Finals								
Season	LG	Grp	Pos	Pld	W	D	L	GF	GA	P/R	Year	Pos	Pld	W	D*	L	GF	GA	Squad
2018–19	A	4	2th	4	2	0	2	12	7	Same position	(Portugal) 2019	did not qualify							
2020–21	A	4	1st	6	3	2	1	13	3	Same position	(Italy) 2021	2nd	2	1	0	1	3	3	Squad
2022–23	A	2	1st	6	3	2	1	8	5	Same position	(Netherlands) 2023	1st	2	1	1	0	2	1	Squad
2024–25	A	4	1st	6	5	1	0	13	4	Same position	(Germany) 2025	2nd	2	1	1	0	7	6	Squad
Total				22	13	5	4	46	19	2nd	Total		6	3	2	1	12	10	1 title

*Draws include knockout matches decided via penalty shoot-out.

Spain's Nations League record
First match	England 1–2 Spain (London, England; 8 September 2018)
Biggest win	Spain 6–0 Croatia (Elche, Spain; 11 September 2018); Spain 6–0 Germany (Seville, Spain; 17 November 2020)
Biggest defeat	Spain 2–3 England (Seville, Spain; 15 October 2018); Croatia 3–2 Spain (Zagreb, Croatia; 15 November 2018); Ukraine 1–0 Spain (Kyiv, Ukraine; 13 October 2020); Spain 1–2 France (Milan, Italy; 10 October 2021); Spain 1–2 Switzerland (Zaragoza, Spain; 24 September 2022)
Best result	Champions in 2022–23
Worst result	Group stage in 2018–19

=== FIFA Confederations Cup ===
FIFA Confederations Cup record
Year	Round	Position	Pld	W	D	L	GF	GA
(Saudi Arabia) 1992	Did not qualify							
(Saudi Arabia) 1995	Did not qualify							
(Saudi Arabia) 1997	Did not qualify							
(Mexico) 1999	Did not qualify							
(South Korea) (Japan) 2001	Did not qualify							
(France) 2003	Did not qualify							
(Germany) 2005	Did not qualify							
(South Africa) 2009	Third place	3rd	5	4	0	1	11	4
(Brazil) 2013	Runners-up	2nd	5	3	1	1	15	4
(Russia) 2017	Did not qualify							
Total	Runners-up	2/10	10	7	1	2	26	8

Spain's Confederations Cup record
First match	Spain 5–0 New Zealand (Rustenburg, South Africa; 14 June 2009)
Biggest win	Spain 10–0 Tahiti (Rio de Janeiro, Brazil; 20 June 2013)
Biggest defeat	Brazil 3–0 Spain (Rio de Janeiro, Brazil; 30 June 2013)
Best result	Runners-up in 2013
Worst result	Third place in 2009

=== Olympic Games ===
Football at the Summer Olympics Olympic Games record
Year	Host	Round	Pos.	Pld.	W	D	L	GF	GA
1920	(Belgium) Antwerp	Silver Medal	2nd	5	4	0	1	9	5
1924	(France) Paris	Round 1	17th	1	0	0	1	0	1
1928	(Netherlands) Amsterdam	Quarter-finals	6th	3	1	1	1	9	9
1936	(Nazi Germany) Berlin	Withdrew							
1948	(United Kingdom) London	Did not qualify							
1952	(Finland) Helsinki	Did not qualify							
1956	(Australia) Melbourne	Did not qualify							
1960	(Italy) Rome	Did not qualify							
1964	(Japan) Tokyo	Did not qualify							
1968	Mexico City	Quarter-finals	5th	4	2	1	1	4	2
1972	(West Germany) Munich	Did not qualify							
1976	(Canada) Montreal	Group stage	13th	2	0	0	2	1	3
1980	(Soviet Union) Moscow	Group stage	10th	3	0	3	0	2	2
1984	(United States) Los Angeles	Did not qualify							
1988	(South Korea) Seoul	Did not qualify							
1992	(Spain) Barcelona	Gold Medal	1st	6	6	0	0	14	2
1996	(United States) Atlanta	Quarter-finals	6th	4	2	1	1	5	7
2000	(Australia) Sydney	Silver Medal	2nd	6	4	1	1	12	6
2004	(Greece) Athens	Did not qualify							
2008	(China) Beijing	Did not qualify							
2012	(United Kingdom) London	Group stage	14th	3	0	1	2	0	2
2016	(Brazil) Rio de Janeiro	Did not qualify							
2020	(Japan) Tokyo	Silver Medal	2nd	6	3	2	1	9	5
2024	(France) Paris	Gold Medal	1st	6	5	0	1	16	8
2028	(United States) Los Angeles	TBD							
2032	(Australia) Brisbane	TBD							
Total		2–3–0	12/24	49	27	10	12	81	52

*Denotes draws including knockout matches decided via penalty shoot-out.
**Since 1968, Spain has sent its under 23 national team.

=== Mediterranean Games ===
Mediterranean Games record
Year	Round	Position	Pld	W	D*	L	GF	GA
(Egypt) 1951	did not qualify							
1955–1967	See Spain national amateur football team							
(Turkey) 1971	did not enter							
(Algeria) 1975	did not enter							
(Socialist Federal Republic of Yugoslavia) 1979	did not enter							
(Morocco) 1983	did not enter							
(Syria) 1987	did not enter							
Since 1991	See Spain national under-23 football team or Spain national under-20 football team or Spain national under-18 football team							

== Head-to-head record ==
Key
Positive balance (more Wins)
Neutral balance (Wins = Losses)
Negative balance (more Losses)

Last match updated was against England on 15 November 2026. Goal difference used to determine placement if results totals of two opponents are identical.

Nationality	Confederation	From	To	P	W	D	L	Win % (Note: A draw counts as a ½ win)	GF	GA	GD
Portugal	UEFA	1921	2026	42	18	18	6	64.29%	80	47	+33
Italy	UEFA	1920	2024	41	14	16	11	53.66%	46	46	0
France	UEFA	1922	2026	39	19	7	13	57.69%	73	44	+29
England	UEFA	1929	2026	30	12	4	14	46.67%	39	51	–12
Germany (Note: Representing West Germany from 1949 to 1990)	UEFA	1935	2024	27	9	9	9	50%	34	32	+2
Switzerland	UEFA	1925	2024	27	19	6	2	81.48%	58	24	+34
Republic of Ireland	UEFA	1931	2013	26	15	7	4	71.15%	54	18	+36
Serbia (Note: Representing Yugoslavia from 1920 to 1992, FR Yugoslavia from 1993 to 2000, and Serbia and Montenegro from 2003 to 2006)	UEFA	1932	2026	25	12	8	5	64%	32	19	+13
Belgium	UEFA	1920	2026	24	13	6	5	66.67%	48	23	+25
Northern Ireland	UEFA	1958	2024	19	12	5	2	76.32%	43	12	+31
Denmark	UEFA	1920	2024	19	14	3	2	81.58%	37	16	+21
Romania	UEFA	1962	2019	18	7	6	5	55.56%	28	19	+9
Sweden	UEFA	1920	2021	18	8	6	4	61.11%	27	18	+9
Austria	UEFA	1924	2026	17	10	3	4	67.65%	46	22	+24
Scotland	UEFA	1957	2023	15	7	4	4	64.29%	25	22	+3
Netherlands	UEFA	1920	2025	15	5	4	6	46.67%	23	24	–1
Argentina	CONMEBOL	1952	2026	15	7	2	6	53.33%	20	18	+2
Russia (Note: Representing Soviet Union from 1922 to 1991, and SCIS from 1991 to 1992)	UEFA	1964	2018	14	6	5	3	60.71%	19	15	+4
Hungary	UEFA	1925	2002	13	5	5	3	57.69%	21	18	+3
Turkey	UEFA	1952	2025	13	7	5	1	73.08%	25	7	+18
Croatia	UEFA	1994	2026	14	8	3	3	57.14%	36	14	+22
Czechoslovakia †	UEFA	1930	1991	12	4	1	7	37.5%	11	15	–4
Greece	UEFA	1970	2021	12	8	3	1	79.17%	21	11	+10
Chile	CONMEBOL	1950	2014	11	8	2	1	81.82%	25	10	+15
Poland	UEFA	1959	2021	11	8	2	1	81.82%	28	9	+19
Uruguay	CONMEBOL	1950	2026	11	6	5	0	77.27%	17	8	+9
Iceland	UEFA	1982	2022	10	7	2	1	80%	15	6	+9
Brazil	CONMEBOL	1934	2024	10	2	3	5	35%	11	17	–6
Norway	UEFA	1978	2023	10	7	2	1	80%	16	4	+15
Cyprus	UEFA	1971	2023	10	9	0	1	90%	44	6	+38
Georgia	UEFA	2012	2025	10	9	0	1	90%	29	5	+24
Albania	UEFA	1986	2024	9	9	0	0	100%	32	3	+29
Czech Republic	UEFA	1996	2026	9	7	2	0	88.89%	15	4	+11
Mexico	CONCACAF	1928	2010	8	5	3	0	81.25%	16	4	+12
Finland	UEFA	1969	2013	8	5	2	1	75%	16	5	+11
Liechtenstein	UEFA	2001	2017	8	8	0	0	100%	39	0	+39
Bosnia & Herzegovina	UEFA	2000	2018	8	6	2	0	87.5%	18	7	+11
Malta	UEFA	1983	2019	8	8	0	0	100%	37	3	+34
Macedonia	UEFA	1994	2017	7	7	0	0	100%	20	4	+16
Ukraine	UEFA	2003	2020	7	5	1	1	78.57%	14	4	+10
Lithuania	UEFA	1993	2021	7	6	1	0	92.86%	18	2	+16
Slovakia	UEFA	1996	2021	7	5	1	1	78.57%	20	6	+15
Bulgaria	UEFA	1933	2025	7	6	1	0	92.86%	30	2	+28
Armenia	UEFA	1995	2009	6	6	0	0	100%	16	1	+15
Luxembourg	UEFA	1981	2015	6	6	0	0	100%	15	0	+15
South Korea	AFC	1990	2016	6	4	2	0	83.33%	16	5	+11
Wales	UEFA	1961	2018	6	3	2	1	66.67%	11	7	+4
Israel	UEFA	1998	2025	6	5	1	0	91.67%	13	3	+10
United States	CONCACAF	1950	2011	5	4	0	1	80%	10	3	+7
San Marino	UEFA	1999	2005	4	4	0	0	100%	26	0	+26
Latvia	UEFA	1992	2007	4	3	1	0	87.5%	9	0	+9
Paraguay	CONMEBOL	1998	2010	4	2	2	0	75%	4	1	+3
Venezuela	CONMEBOL	1981	2012	4	4	0	0	100%	13	2	+11
South Africa	CAF	2002	2013	4	3	0	1	75%	8	5	+3
Belarus	UEFA	2012	2015	4	4	0	0	100%	10	1	+9
Faroe Islands	UEFA	1996	2019	4	4	0	0	100%	17	4	+13
Costa Rica	CONCACAF	2011	2022	4	3	1	0	87.5%	16	3	+13
Morocco	CAF	1961	2022	4	2	2	0	75%	6	4	+2
Colombia	CONMEBOL	1981	2024	4	1	2	1	50%	4	4	0
Peru	CONMEBOL	1960	2026	4	4	0	0	100%	10	4	+6
Saudi Arabia	AFC	2006	2026	4	4	0	0	100%	13	2	+11
East Germany †	UEFA	1980	1988	3	0	2	1	33.33%	0	1	–1
Slovenia	UEFA	2000	2002	2	2	0	0	100%	5	2	+3
Canada	CONCACAF	1994	2005	2	2	0	0	100%	4	1	+3
Estonia	UEFA	2008	2009	2	2	0	0	100%	6	0	+6
Honduras	CONCACAF	1982	2010	2	1	1	0	75%	3	1	+2
China	AFC	2005	2012	2	2	0	0	100%	4	0	+4
Nigeria	CAF	1998	2013	2	1	0	1	50%	5	3	+2
Ecuador	CONMEBOL	2003	2013	2	2	0	0	100%	6	0	+6
Bolivia	CONMEBOL	1994	2014	2	2	0	0	100%	5	1	+4
Tunisia	CAF	2006	2018	2	2	0	0	100%	4	1	+3
Kosovo	UEFA	2021	2021	2	2	0	0	100%	5	1	+4
Japan	AFC	2001	2022	2	1	0	1	50%	2	2	0
Andorra	UEFA	2004	2024	2	2	0	0	100%	9	0	+9
Egypt	CAF	2006	2026	2	1	1	0	75%	2	0	+2
Iraq	AFC	2009	2026	2	1	1	0	75%	2	1	+1
Algeria	CAF	1986	1986	1	1	0	0	100%	3	0	+3
Ivory Coast	CAF	2006	2006	1	1	0	0	100%	3	2	+1
Azerbaijan	UEFA	2009	2009	1	1	0	0	100%	6	0	+6
New Zealand	OFC	2009	2009	1	1	0	0	100%	5	0	+5
Puerto Rico	CONCACAF	2012	2012	1	1	0	0	100%	2	1	+1
Panama	CONCACAF	2012	2012	1	1	0	0	100%	5	1	+4
Haiti	CONCACAF	2013	2013	1	1	0	0	100%	2	1	+1
Tahiti	OFC	2013	2013	1	1	0	0	100%	10	0	+10
Equatorial Guinea (Note: The game between Equatorial Guinea and Spain in November 2013 was declared void by FIFA a month later due to a procedural error in confirming the use of a local referee. However, the RFEF includes the match and player statistics in its records, and these are usually counted in other sources (e.g. Juanfran Torres scored his only international goal in the fixture).)	CAF	2013	2013	1	1	0	0	100%	2	1	+1
El Salvador	CONCACAF	2014	2014	1	1	0	0	100%	2	0	+2
Australia	AFC	2014	2014	1	1	0	0	100%	3	0	+3
Iran	AFC	2018	2018	1	1	0	0	100%	1	0	+1
Jordan (Note: The match between Jordan and Spain on 17 November 2022 will not count as an official friendly. The reason for that is because the Spanish FA and FIFA have agreed to increase the number of substitutions each team can make so that Spain's players are fresh for the start of the World Cup.)	AFC	2022	2022	1	1	0	0	100%	3	1	+2
Cape Verde	CAF	2026	2026	1	0	1	0	50%	0	0	0
TOTAL		1920	2026	792	474	179	139	59.85%	1610	700	+910

Notes:

- (†) Defunct national teams

=== Combined predecessor and successor Records ===
Flag	Nationality	From	To	P	W	D	L	Win %	GF	GA	GD
(Nazi Germany)	Nazi Germany †	1935	1942	3	1	1	1	50%	4	4	0
(West Germany)	West Germany †	1952	1988	12	3	3	6	37.5%	12	17	–5
(Germany)	Germany	1994	2024	12	5	5	2	62.5%	18	11	+7
TOTAL				27	9	9	9	50%	34	32	+2

Flag	Nationality	From	To	P	W	D	L	Win %	GF	GA	GD
(Republic of Ireland)	Irish Free State †	1931	1931	2	1	1	0	75%	6	1	+5
(Republic of Ireland)	Republic of Ireland	1946	2013	24	14	6	4	70.83%	48	17	+31
TOTAL				26	15	7	4	71.15%	54	18	+36

Flag	Nationality	From	To	P	W	D	L	Win %	GF	GA	GD
(Czechoslovakia)	Czechoslovakia †	1930	1991	12	4	1	7	37.5%	11	15	–4
(Czech Republic)	Czech Republic	1996	2026	9	7	2	0	88.89%	15	4	+11
TOTAL				21	11	3	7	59.52%	26	19	+7

Flag	Nationality	From	To	P	W	D	L	Win %	GF	GA	GD
(Czechoslovakia)	Czechoslovakia †	1930	1991	12	4	1	7	37.5%	11	15	–4
(Slovakia)	Slovakia	1996	2021	7	5	1	1	78.57%	20	6	+14
TOTAL				19	9	2	8	52.63%	31	21	+10

Flag	Nationality	From	To	P	W	D	L	Win %	GF	GA	GD
(Socialist Federal Republic of Yugoslavia)	Yugoslavia †	1932	1990	16	7	4	5	56.25%	16	14	+2
(Federal Republic of Yugoslavia)	FR Yugoslavia †	1996	2000	3	2	1	0	83.33%	7	4	+3
(Serbia and Montenegro)	Serbia and Montenegro †	2005	2005	2	0	2	0	50%	1	1	0
(Serbia)	Serbia	2012	2026	4	3	1	0	87.5%	8	0	+8
TOTAL				25	12	8	5	64%	32	19	+13

Flag	Nationality	From	To	P	W	D	L	Win %	GF	GA	GD
(Soviet Union)	Soviet Union †	1969	1986	6	2	1	3	41.67%	5	9	-4
(Commonwealth of Independent States)	CIS †	1992	1992	1	0	1	0	50%	1	1	0
(Russia)	Russia	1998	2018	7	4	3	0	78.57%	13	5	+8
TOTAL				14	6	5	3	60.71%	19	15	+4

Notes:

- (†) Defunct national teams

=== Opponents ===
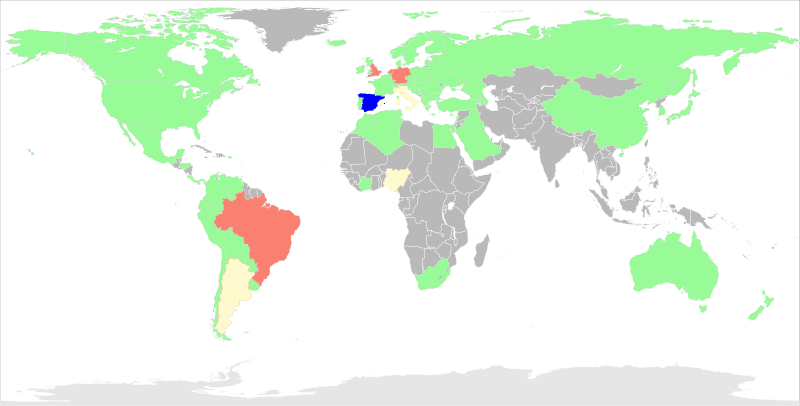
31 May 2018

#	Confederations	Played (rivals)	Won (rivals)	Drawn (rivals)	Lost (rivals)	Win %	GF	GA	GD	Period
	UEFA	657 (60)	375 (55)	154 (42)	119 (33)	68.8%	1307	590	717	1920–2026
	CONMEBOL	66 (10)	37 (10)	16 (6)	13 (4)	68.18%	115	65	70	1934–2026
	CONCACAF	25 (9)	19 (9)	5 (3)	1 (1)	86%	60	15	38	1928–2022
	AFC	18 (7)	15 (7)	2 (1)	1 (1)	88.89%	38	8	30	1990–2026
	CAF	14 (7)	11 (7)	1 (1)	2 (2)	82.14%	30	15	15	1961–2018
	OFC	2 (2)	2 (2)	0 (0)	0 (0)	100%	15	0	15	2009–2013

Opponents against those who have never played
in brackets teams from which had played in at least one FIFA World Cup.

Spain had the problem of isolation under General Franco's dictatorship. “Europe ends at the Pyrenees” was the saying in those days. Sweden, England, Brazil, Argentina, Italy, France and Germany had all played more than 700 internationals matches by 2001. Spain only 454 matches.

UEFA

- Gibraltar (Note: The matches between Gibraltar and Spain are prohibited in qualification phases for political reasons)
- Kazakhstan (Note: The matches between Kazakhstan and Spain are restrictioned for excessive travel distance in UEFA qualification phases)
- Moldova
- Montenegro

AFC

- Afghanistan
- Bahrain
- Bangladesh
- Bhutan
- Brunei
- Cambodia
- Chinese Taipei
- East Timor
- Guam
- Hong Kong
- India
- Indonesia (1)
- Kuwait (1)
- Kyrgyzstan
- Laos
- Lebanon
- Macao
- Malaysia
- Maldives
- Mongolia
- Myanmar
- Nepal
- North Korea (2)
- Oman
- Qatar
- Pakistan
- Palestine
- Philippines
- Qatar (2)
- Singapore
- Sri Lanka
- Syria
- Tajikistan
- Thailand
- Turkmenistan
- United Arab Emirates (1)
- Uzbekistan (1)
- Vietnam
- Yemen

CAF

- Angola (1)
- Benin
- Botswana
- Burkina Faso
- Burundi
- Cameroon (8)
- Central African Republic
- Chad
- Comoros
- Congo
- DR Congo (2)
- Djibouti
- Eritrea
- Eswatini
- Ethiopia
- Gabon
- Gambia
- Ghana (5)
- Guinea
- Guinea-Bissau
- Kenya
- Lesotho
- Liberia
- Libya
- Madagascar
- Malawi
- Mali
- Mauritania
- Mauritius
- Mozambique
- Namibia
- Niger
- Rwanda
- São Tomé & Príncipe
- Senegal (4)
- Seychelles
- Sierra Leone
- Somalia
- South Sudan
- Sudan
- Tanzania
- Togo (1)
- Uganda
- Zambia
- Zimbabwe

CONCACAF

- Anguilla
- Antigua & Barbuda
- Aruba
- Bahamas
- Barbados
- Belize
- Bermuda
- British Virgin Islands
- Cayman Islands
- Cuba (1)
- Curaçao (1)
- Dominica
- Dominican Republic
- Grenada
- Guatemala
- Guyana
- Jamaica (1)
- Montserrat
- Nicaragua
- Saint Kitts & Nevis
- Saint Lucia
- Saint Vincent & the Grenadines
- Suriname
- Trinidad & Tobago (1)
- Turks & Caicos Islands
- U.S. Virgin Islands

OFC

- American Samoa
- Cook Islands
- Fiji
- New Caledonia
- Papua New Guinea
- Samoa
- Solomon Islands
- Tonga
- Vanuatu

== See also ==
- Spain national football team results
- Spain national football team records and statistics
