= Spain national football team results =

These are the Spain national football team all-time results:

== Results ==
=== Key ===
	Meaning
S.O.	Summer Olympics
W.C.	FIFA World Cup
EURO	UEFA European Football Championship
CC	Confederations Cup
UNL	UEFA Nations League
TB	Tie-break match
Q	Qualification rounds
R + number	Round number
FR	Final Round
GS	Group Stage
1/16	Round of 32
1/8	Round of 16
QF	Quarter-final
SF	Semi-final
F	Final
RP	Repechage
Rep.	Replay match
3rd–4th	Third place match

=== 1920–1939 ===
57 matches played:

1920–1939
Win Draw Defeat
M	Opponent	Result	Event
1	Denmark	1–0	(Belgium) 1920 S.O.
2	Belgium	3–1	(Belgium) 1920 S.O.
3	Sweden	2–1	(Belgium) 1920 S.O.
4	Italy	2–0	(Belgium) 1920 S.O.
5	Netherlands	3–1	(Belgium) 1920 S.O.
6	Belgium	2–0	Friendly
7	Portugal	3–1	Friendly
8	France	0–4	Friendly
9	Portugal	1–2	Friendly
10	France	3–0	Friendly
11	Belgium	1–0	Friendly
12	Portugal	3-0	Friendly
13	Italy	0–0	Friendly
14	Italy	1–0	(France) 1924 S.O.
15	Austria	2–1	Friendly
16	Portugal	0–2	Friendly
17	Switzerland	0–3	Friendly
18	Italy	1–0	Friendly
19	Austria	0–1	Friendly
20	Hungary	0–1	Friendly
21	Hungary	4–2	Friendly
22	Switzerland	1–0	Friendly
23	France	1–4	Friendly
24	Italy	2–0	Friendly
25	Portugal	2–2	Friendly
26	Italy	1–1	Friendly
27	Mexico	7–1	(Netherlands) 1928 S.O.
28	Italy	1–1	(Netherlands) 1928 S.O.
29	Italy	7–1	(Netherlands) 1928 S.O.
30	Portugal	5–0	Friendly
31	France	8–1	Friendly
32	England	4–3	Friendly
33	Czechoslovakia	1–0	Friendly
34	Czechoslovakia	2–0	Friendly
35	Italy	2–3	Friendly
36	Portugal	0–1	Friendly
37	Italy	0–0	Friendly
38	Ireland	1–1	Friendly
39	England	7–1	Friendly
40	Ireland	0–5	Friendly
41	Yugoslavia	2–1	Friendly
42	Portugal	3–0	Friendly
43	France	1–0	Friendly
44	Yugoslavia	1–1	Friendly
45	Bulgaria	8–1	Friendly
46	Portugal	9–0	(Italy) 1934 W.C. Q
47	Portugal	1–2	(Italy) 1934 W.C. Q
48	Brazil	3–1	(Italy) 1934 W.C.
49	Italy	1–1	(Italy) 1934 W.C.
50	Italy	1–0	(Italy) 1934 W.C.
51	France	2–0	Friendly
52	Portugal	3–3	Friendly
53	Germany	1–2	Friendly
54	Austria	4–5	Friendly
55	Germany	1–2	Friendly
56	Czechoslovakia	1–0	Friendly
57	Switzerland	0–2	Friendly

=== 1940–1959 ===
63 matches played:

1940–1959
Win Draw Defeat
M	Rival	Result	Event
58	Portugal	2–2	Friendly
59	Portugal	5–1	Friendly
60	Switzerland	3–2	Friendly
61	France	4–0	Friendly
62	Germany	1–1	Friendly
63	Italy	4–0	Friendly
64	Portugal	2–2	Friendly
65	Portugal	4–2	Friendly
66	Ireland	0–1	Friendly
67	Portugal	4–1	Friendly
68	Ireland	3–2	Friendly
69	Portugal	2–0	Friendly
70	Ireland	2–1	Friendly
71	Switzerland	3–3	Friendly
72	Belgium	1–1	Friendly
73	Portugal	1–1	Friendly
74	Italy	1–3	Friendly
75	Ireland	1–4	Friendly
76	France	1–5	Friendly
77	Portugal	5–1	(Brazil) 1950 W.C. Q
78	Portugal	2–2	(Brazil) 1950 W.C. Q
79	United States	3–1	(Brazil) 1950 W.C.
80	Chile	2–0	(Brazil) 1950 W.C.
81	England	1–0	(Brazil) 1950 W.C.
82	Uruguay	2–2	(Brazil) 1950 W.C.
83	Brazil	6–1	(Brazil) 1950 W.C.
84	Sweden	3–1	(Brazil) 1950 W.C.
85	Switzerland	6–3	Friendly
86	Belgium	3–3	Friendly
87	Sweden	0–0	Friendly
88	Republic of Ireland	6–0	Friendly
89	Turkey	0–0	Friendly
90	Argentina	0–1	Friendly
91	West Germany	2–2	Friendly
92	Belgium	3–1	Friendly
93	Argentina	1–0	Friendly
94	Chile	1–2	Friendly
95	Sweden	2–2	Friendly
96	Turkey	4–1	(Switzerland) 1954 W.C. Q
97	Turkey	1–0	(Switzerland) 1954 W.C. Q
98	Turkey	2–2	(Switzerland) 1954 W.C. Q
99	France	1–2	Friendly
100	England	1–1	Friendly
101	Switzerland	0–3	Friendly
102	Republic of Ireland	2–2	Friendly
103	England	4–1	Friendly
104	Portugal	3–1	Friendly
105	Netherlands	5–1	Friendly
106	Switzerland	2–2	(Sweden) 1958 W.C. Q
107	Belgium	0–5	Friendly
108	Scotland	4–2	(Sweden) 1958 W.C. Q
109	Scotland	4–1	(Sweden) 1958 W.C. Q
110	Turkey	3–0	Friendly
111	Switzerland	1–4	(Sweden) 1958 W.C. Q
112	France	2–2	Friendly
113	West Germany	2–0	Friendly
114	Portugal	1–0	Friendly
115	Northern Ireland	6–2	Friendly
116	Italy	1–1	Friendly
117	Poland	2–4	(France) 1960 EURO Q
118	Poland	3–0	(France) 1960 EURO Q
119	Austria	6–3	Friendly
120	France	4–3	Friendly

=== 1960–1979 ===
119 matches played:

1960–1979
Win Draw Defeat
M	Rival	Result	Event
121	Italy	3–1	Friendly
122	England	3–0	Friendly
123	Peru	1–3	Friendly
124	Chile	0–4	Friendly
125	Chile	1–4	Friendly
126	Argentina	2–0	Friendly
127	England	4–2	Friendly
128	Austria	3–0	Friendly
129	France	2–0	Friendly
130	Wales	1–2	(Chile) 1962 W.C. Q
131	Wales	1–1	(Chile) 1962 W.C. Q
132	Argentina	2–0	Friendly
133	Morocco	0–1	(Chile) 1962 W.C. Q
134	Morocco	3–2	(Chile) 1962 W.C. Q
135	France	1–1	Friendly
136	Czechoslovakia	1–0	(Chile) 1962 W.C.
137	Mexico	1–0	(Chile) 1962 W.C.
138	Brazil	2–1	(Chile) 1962 W.C.
139	Romania	6–0	(Spain) 1964 EURO Q
140	Romania	3–1	(Spain) 1964 EURO Q
141	Belgium	1–1	Friendly
142	France	0–0	Friendly
143	Northern Ireland	1–1	(Spain) 1964 EURO Q
144	Scotland	2–6	Friendly
145	Northern Ireland	0–1	(Spain) 1964 EURO Q
146	Belgium	1–2	Friendly
147	Republic of Ireland	5–1	(Spain) 1964 EURO Q
148	Republic of Ireland	0–2	(Spain) 1964 EURO Q
149	Hungary	1–2	(Spain) 1964 EURO
150	Soviet Union	2–1	(Spain) 1964 EURO
151	Portugal	2–1	Friendly
152	Republic of Ireland	1–0	(England) 1966 W.C. Q
153	Scotland	0–0	Friendly
154	Republic of Ireland	4–1	(England) 1966 W.C. Q
155	Republic of Ireland	1–0	(England) 1966 W.C. Q
156	England	0–2	Friendly
157	Uruguay	1–1	Friendly
158	Argentina	2–1	(England) 1966 W.C.
159	Switzerland	2–1	(England) 1966 W.C.
160	West Germany	2–1	(England) 1966 W.C.
161	Republic of Ireland	0–0	(Italy) 1968 EURO Q
162	Republic of Ireland	2–0	(Italy) 1968 EURO Q
163	Turkey	0–0	(Italy) 1968 EURO Q
164	England	2–0	Friendly
165	Turkey	2–0	(Italy) 1968 EURO Q
166	Czechoslovakia	1–0	(Italy) 1968 EURO Q
167	Czechoslovakia	2–1	(Italy) 1968 EURO Q
168	Sweden	3–1	Friendly
169	England	1–0	(Italy) 1968 EURO Q
170	Sweden	1–1	Friendly
171	England	1–2	(Italy) 1968 EURO Q
172	France	1–3	Friendly
173	Yugoslavia	0–0	(Mexico) 1970 W.C. Q
174	Belgium	1–1	(Mexico) 1970 W.C. Q
175	Belgium	2–1	(Mexico) 1970 W.C. Q
176	Switzerland	1–0	Friendly
177	Mexico	0–0	Friendly
178	Yugoslavia	2–1	(Mexico) 1970 W.C. Q
179	Finland	2–0	(Mexico) 1970 W.C. Q
180	Finland	6–0	(Mexico) 1970 W.C. Q
181	West Germany	2–0	Friendly
182	Italy	2–2	Friendly
183	Switzerland	0–1	Friendly
184	Greece	2–1	Friendly
185	Northern Ireland	3–0	(Belgium) 1972 EURO Q
186	Italy	1–2	Friendly
187	France	2–2	Friendly
188	Cyprus	0–2	(Belgium) 1972 EURO Q
189	Soviet Union	2–1	(Belgium) 1972 EURO Q
190	Soviet Union	0–0	(Belgium) 1972 EURO Q
191	Cyprus	7–0	(Belgium) 1972 EURO Q
192	Hungary	1–0	Friendly
193	Northern Ireland	1–1	(Belgium) 1972 EURO Q
194	Greece	0–0	Friendly
195	Uruguay	2–0	Friendly
196	Argentina	1–0	Friendly
197	Yugoslavia	2–2	(West Germany) 1974 W.C. Q
198	Greece	2–3	(West Germany) 1974 W.C. Q
199	Greece	3–1	(West Germany) 1974 W.C. Q
200	Netherlands	3–2	Friendly
201	Turkey	0–0	Friendly
202	Yugoslavia	0–0	(West Germany) 1974 W.C. Q
203	West Germany	2–1	Friendly
204	Yugoslavia	1–0	(West Germany) 1974 W.C. TB
205	West Germany	1–2	Friendly
206	Denmark	1–2	(Socialist Federal Republic of Yugoslavia) 1976 EURO Q
207	Argentina	1–1	Friendly
208	Scotland	1–2	(Socialist Federal Republic of Yugoslavia) 1976 EURO Q
209	Scotland	1–1	(Socialist Federal Republic of Yugoslavia) 1976 EURO Q
210	Romania	1–1	(Socialist Federal Republic of Yugoslavia) 1976 EURO Q
211	Denmark	2–0	(Socialist Federal Republic of Yugoslavia) 1976 EURO Q
212	Romania	2–2	(Socialist Federal Republic of Yugoslavia) 1976 EURO Q
213	West Germany	1–1	(Socialist Federal Republic of Yugoslavia) 1976 EURO Q
214	West Germany	2–0	(Socialist Federal Republic of Yugoslavia) 1976 EURO Q
215	Yugoslavia	1–0	(Argentina) 1978 W.C. Q
216	Republic of Ireland	0–1	Friendly
217	Hungary	1–1	Friendly
218	Romania	1–0	(Argentina) 1978 W.C. Q
219	Switzerland	1–2	Friendly
220	Romania	2–0	(Argentina) 1978 W.C. Q
221	Yugoslavia	0–1	(Argentina) 1978 W.C. Q
222	Italy	2–1	Friendly
223	Norway	3–0	Friendly
224	Mexico	2–0	Friendly
225	Uruguay	0–0	Friendly
226	Austria	2–1	(Argentina) 1978 W.C. GS
227	Brazil	0–0	(Argentina) 1978 W.C. GS
228	Sweden	1–0	(Argentina) 1978 W.C. GS
229	Yugoslavia	1–2	(Italy) 1980 EURO Q
230	France	1–0	Friendly
231	Romania	1–0	(Italy) 1980 EURO Q
232	Cyprus	5–0	(Italy) 1980 EURO Q
233	Italy	1–0	Friendly
234	Czechoslovakia	1–0	Friendly
235	Romania	2–2	(Italy) 1980 EURO Q
236	Portugal	1–1	Friendly
237	Yugoslavia	0–1	(Italy) 1980 EURO Q
238	Denmark	1–3	Friendly
239	Cyprus	1–3	(Italy) 1980 EURO Q

=== 1980–1989 ===
103 matches played:

1980–1989
Win Draw Defeat
M	Opponent	Result	Event
240	Netherlands	1-0	Friendly
241	East Germany	0-1	Friendly
242	England	0-2	Friendly
243	Czechoslovakia	2-2	Friendly
244	Denmark	2-2	Friendly
245	Italy	0-0	(Italy) 1980 EURO
246	Belgium	2-1	(Italy) 1980 EURO
247	England	1-2	(Italy) 1980 EURO
248	Hungary	2-2	Friendly
249	East Germany	0-0	Friendly
250	Poland	1-2	Friendly
251	France	1-0	Friendly
252	England	1-2	Friendly
253	Hungary	0-3	Friendly
254	Portugal	2-0	Friendly
255	Mexico	1-3	Friendly
256	Venezuela	0-2	Friendly
257	Colombia	1-1	Friendly
258	Chile	1-1	Friendly
259	Brazil	1-0	Friendly
260	Austria	0-0	Friendly
261	Luxembourg	3-0	Friendly
262	Poland	2-3	Friendly
263	Belgium	2-0	Friendly
264	Scotland	3-0	Friendly
265	Wales	3-0	Friendly
266	Switzerland	1-1	Friendly
267	Honduras	1-1	(Spain) 1982 W.C.
268	Yugoslavia	2-1	(Spain) 1982 W.C.
269	Northern Ireland	0-1	(Spain) 1982 W.C.
270	West Germany	2-1	(Spain) 1982 W.C.
271	England	0-0	(Spain) 1982 W.C.
272	Iceland	1-0	(France) 1984 EURO Q
273	Republic of Ireland	3-3	(France) 1984 EURO Q
274	Netherlands	1-0	(France) 1984 EURO Q
275	Republic of Ireland	2-0	(France) 1984 EURO Q
276	Malta	2-3	(France) 1984 EURO Q
277	Iceland	0-1	(France) 1984 EURO Q
278	France	1-1	Friendly
279	Netherlands	2-1	(France) 1984 EURO Q
280	Malta	12-1	(France) 1984 EURO Q
281	Hungary	0-1	Friendly
282	Luxembourg	0-1	Friendly
283	Denmark	2-1	Friendly
284	Switzerland	0-4	Friendly
285	Hungary	1-1	Friendly
286	Yugoslavia	0-1	Friendly
287	Romania	1-1	(France) 1984 EURO
288	Portugal	1-1	(France) 1984 EURO
289	West Germany	0-1	(France) 1984 EURO
290	Denmark	1-1	(France) 1984 EURO
291	France	0-2	(France) 1984 EURO
292	Wales	3-0	(Mexico) 1986 W.C. Q
293	Scotland	3-1	(Mexico) 1986 W.C. Q
294	Finland	3-1	Friendly
295	Scotland	1-0	(Mexico) 1986 W.C. Q
296	Northern Ireland	0-0	Friendly
297	Wales	3-0	(Mexico) 1986 W.C. Q
298	Republic of Ireland	0-0	Friendly
299	Iceland	1-2	(Mexico) 1986 W.C. Q
300	Iceland	2-1	(Mexico) 1986 W.C. Q
301	Austria	0-0	Friendly
302	Bulgaria	2-0	Friendly
303	Soviet Union	2-0	Friendly
304	Belgium	3-0	Friendly
305	Poland	3-0	Friendly
306	Brazil	1-0	(Mexico) 1986 W.C.
307	Northern Ireland	2-1	(Mexico) 1986 W.C.
308	Algeria	3-0	(Mexico) 1986 W.C.
309	Denmark	1-5	(Mexico) 1986 W.C.
310	Belgium	1-1	(Mexico) 1986 W.C.
311	Greece	3-1	Friendly
312	West Germany	2-2	Friendly
313	Romania	1-0	(West Germany) 1988 EURO Q
314	Albania	1-2	(West Germany) 1988 EURO Q
315	Netherlands	1-1	Friendly
316	England	2-4	Friendly
317	Austria	2-3	(West Germany) 1988 EURO Q
318	Romania	3-1	(West Germany) 1988 EURO Q
319	Luxembourg	2-0	Friendly
320	Austria	2-0	(West Germany) 1988 EURO Q
321	Albania	5-0	(West Germany) 1988 EURO Q
322	East Germany	0-0	Friendly
323	Czechoslovakia	1-2	Friendly
324	France	2-1	Friendly
325	Scotland	0-0	Friendly
326	Sweden	1-2	Friendly
327	Switzerland	1-1	Friendly
328	Denmark	2-3	(West Germany) 1988 EURO
329	Italy	1-0	(West Germany) 1988 EURO
330	West Germany	2-0	(West Germany) 1988 EURO
331	Yugoslavia	1-2	Friendly
332	Argentina	1-1	Friendly
333	Republic of Ireland	2-0	(Italy) 1990 W.C. Q
334	Northern Ireland	4-0	(Italy) 1990 W.C. Q
335	Malta	0-2	(Italy) 1990 W.C. Q
336	Northern Ireland	0-2	(Italy) 1990 W.C. Q
337	Malta	4-0	(Italy) 1990 W.C. Q
338	Republic of Ireland	1-0	(Italy) 1990 W.C. Q
339	Poland	1-0	Friendly
340	Hungary	2-2	(Italy) 1990 W.C. Q
341	Hungary	4-0	(Italy) 1990 W.C. Q
342	Switzerland	2-1	Friendly

=== 1990–1999 ===
98 matches played:

1990–1999
Win Draw Defeat
M	Opponent	Result	Event
343	Czechoslovakia	1-0	Friendly
344	Austria	2-3	Friendly
345	Yugoslavia	0-1	Friendly
346	Uruguay	0-0	(Italy) 1990 W.C.
347	South Korea	1-3	(Italy) 1990 W.C.
348	Belgium	1-2	(Italy) 1990 W.C.
349	Yugoslavia	1-2	(Italy) 1990 W.C.
350	Brazil	3-0	Friendly
351	Iceland	2-1	(Sweden) 1992 EURO Q
352	Czechoslovakia	3-2	(Sweden) 1992 EURO Q
353	Albania	9-0	(Sweden) 1992 EURO Q
354	Portugal	1-1	Friendly
355	France	3-1	(Sweden) 1992 EURO Q
356	Hungary	2-4	Friendly
357	Romania	0-2	Friendly
358	Uruguay	2-1	Friendly
359	Iceland	2-0	(Sweden) 1992 EURO Q
360	France	1-2	(Sweden) 1992 EURO Q
361	Czechoslovakia	2-1	(Sweden) 1992 EURO Q
362	Portugal	0-0	Friendly
363	CIS	1-1	Friendly
364	United States	2-0	Friendly
365	Albania	3-0	(United States) 1994 W.C. Q
366	England	1-0	Friendly
367	Latvia	0-0	(United States) 1994 W.C. Q
368	Northern Ireland	0-0	(United States) 1994 W.C. Q
369	Republic of Ireland	0-0	(United States) 1994 W.C. Q
370	Latvia	5-0	(United States) 1994 W.C. Q
371	Mexico	0-0	Friendly
372	Lithuania	5-0	(United States) 1994 W.C. Q
373	Denmark	1-0	(United States) 1994 W.C. Q
374	Northern Ireland	3-1	(United States) 1994 W.C. Q
375	Lithuania	0-2	(United States) 1994 W.C. Q
376	Chile	2-0	Friendly
377	Albania	1-5	(United States) 1994 W.C. Q
378	Republic of Ireland	1-3	(United States) 1994 W.C. Q
379	Denmark	1-0	(United States) 1994 W.C. Q
380	Portugal	2-2	Friendly
381	Poland	1-1	Friendly
382	Croatia	0-2	Friendly
383	Finland	1-2	Friendly
384	Canada	0-2	Friendly
385	South Korea	2-2	(United States) 1994 W.C.
386	Germany	1-1	(United States) 1994 W.C.
387	Bolivia	1-3	(United States) 1994 W.C.
388	Switzerland	3-0	(United States) 1994 W.C.
389	Italy	2-1	(United States) 1994 W.C.
390	Cyprus	1-2	(England) 1996 EURO Q
391	Macedonia	0-2	(England) 1996 EURO Q
392	Denmark	3-0	(England) 1996 EURO Q
393	Finland	2-0	Friendly
394	Belgium	1-4	(England) 1996 EURO Q
395	Uruguay	2-2	Friendly
396	Germany	0-0	Friendly
397	Belgium	1-1	(England) 1996 EURO Q
398	Armenia	0-2	(England) 1996 EURO Q
399	Armenia	1-0	(England) 1996 EURO Q
400	Cyprus	6-0	(England) 1996 EURO Q
401	Argentina	2-1	Friendly
402	Denmark	1-1	(England) 1996 EURO Q
403	Macedonia	3-0	(England) 1996 EURO Q
404	Norway	1-0	Friendly
405	Norway	0-0	Friendly
406	Bulgaria	1-1	(England) 1996 EURO
407	France	1-1	(England) 1996 EURO
408	Romania	1-2	(England) 1996 EURO
409	England	0-0	(England) 1996 EURO
410	Faroe Islands	2-6	(France) 1998 W.C. Q
411	Czech Republic	0-0	(France) 1998 W.C. Q
412	Slovakia	4-1	(France) 1998 W.C. Q
413	FR Yugoslavia	2-0	(France) 1998 W.C. Q
414	Malta	0-3	(France) 1998 W.C. Q
415	Malta	4-0	(France) 1998 W.C. Q
416	FR Yugoslavia	1-1	(France) 1998 W.C. Q
417	Czech Republic	1-0	(France) 1998 W.C. Q
418	Slovakia	1-2	(France) 1998 W.C. Q
419	Faroe Islands	3-1	(France) 1998 W.C. Q
420	Romania	1-1	Friendly
421	France	1-0	Friendly
422	Sweden	4-0	Friendly
423	Northern Ireland	4-1	Friendly
424	Nigeria	3-2	(France) 1998 W.C.
425	Paraguay	0-0	(France) 1998 W.C.
426	Bulgaria	6-1	(France) 1998 W.C.
427	Cyprus	3-2	(Belgium) (Netherlands) 2000 EURO Q
428	Russia	1-0	Friendly
429	Israel	1-2	(Belgium) (Netherlands) 2000 EURO Q
430	Italy	2-2	Friendly
431	Austria	9-0	(Belgium) (Netherlands) 2000 EURO Q
432	San Marino	0-6	(Belgium) (Netherlands) 2000 EURO Q
433	Croatia	3-1	Friendly
434	San Marino	9-0	(Belgium) (Netherlands) 2000 EURO Q
435	Poland	1-2	Friendly
436	Austria	1-3	(Belgium) (Netherlands) 2000 EURO Q
437	Cyprus	8-0	(Belgium) (Netherlands) 2000 EURO Q
438	Israel	3-0	(Belgium) (Netherlands) 2000 EURO Q
439	Brazil	0-0	Friendly
440	Argentina	0-2	Friendly

=== 2000–2009 ===
130 matches played:

2000–2009
Win Draw Defeat
M	Opponent	Result	Event
441	Poland	3–0	Friendly
442	Croatia	0–0	Friendly
443	Italy	2–0	Friendly
444	Sweden	1–1	Friendly
445	Luxembourg	0–1	Friendly
446	Norway	0–1	(Belgium) (Netherlands) 2000 EURO
447	Slovenia	1–2	(Belgium) (Netherlands) 2000 EURO
448	FR Yugoslavia	3–4	(Belgium) (Netherlands) 2000 EURO
449	France	1–2	(Belgium) (Netherlands) 2000 EURO
450	Germany	4–1	Friendly
451	Bosnia and Herzegovina	1–2	(South Korea) (Japan) 2002 W.C. Q
452	Israel	2–0	(South Korea) (Japan) 2002 W.C. Q
453	Austria	1–1	(South Korea) (Japan) 2002 W.C. Q
454	Netherlands	1–2	Friendly
455	England	3–0	Friendly
456	Liechtenstein	5–0	(South Korea) (Japan) 2002 W.C. Q
457	France	2–1	Friendly
458	Japan	1–0	Friendly
459	Bosnia and Herzegovina	4–1	(South Korea) (Japan) 2002 W.C. Q
460	Israel	1–1	(South Korea) (Japan) 2002 W.C. Q
461	Austria	4–0	(South Korea) (Japan) 2002 W.C. Q
462	Liechtenstein	0–2	(South Korea) (Japan) 2002 W.C. Q
463	Mexico	1–0	Friendly
464	Portugal	1–1	Friendly
465	Netherlands	1–0	Friendly
466	Northern Ireland	0–5	Friendly
467	Slovenia	3–1	(South Korea) (Japan) 2002 W.C.
468	Paraguay	3–1	(South Korea) (Japan) 2002 W.C.
469	South Africa	2–3	(South Korea) (Japan) 2002 W.C.
470	Republic of Ireland	1–1	(South Korea) (Japan) 2002 W.C.
471	South Korea	0–0	(South Korea) (Japan) 2002 W.C.
472	Hungary	1–1	Friendly
473	Greece	0–2	(Portugal) 2004 EURO Q
474	Northern Ireland	3–0	(Portugal) 2004 EURO Q
475	Paraguay	0–0	Friendly
476	Bulgaria	1–0	Friendly
477	Germany	3–1	Friendly
478	Ukraine	2–2	(Portugal) 2004 EURO Q
479	Armenia	3–0	(Portugal) 2004 EURO Q
480	Ecuador	4–0	Friendly
481	Greece	0–1	(Portugal) 2004 EURO Q
482	Northern Ireland	0–0	(Portugal) 2004 EURO Q
483	Portugal	0–3	Friendly
484	Ukraine	2–1	(Portugal) 2004 EURO Q
485	Armenia	0–4	(Portugal) 2004 EURO Q
486	Norway	2–1	(Portugal) 2004 EURO RP
487	Norway	0–3	(Portugal) 2004 EURO RP
488	Peru	2–1	Friendly
489	Denmark	2–0	Friendly
490	Italy	1–1	Friendly
491	Andorra	4–0	Friendly
492	Russia	1–0	(Portugal) 2004 EURO
493	Greece	1–1	(Portugal) 2004 EURO
494	Portugal	0–1	(Portugal) 2004 EURO
495	Venezuela	3–2	Friendly
496	Scotland	1–1	Friendly
497	Bosnia and Herzegovina	1–1	(Germany) 2006 W.C. Q
498	Belgium	2–0	(Germany) 2006 W.C. Q
499	Lithuania	0–0	(Germany) 2006 W.C. Q
500	England	1–0	Friendly
501	San Marino	5–0	(Germany) 2006 W.C. Q
502	China	3–0	Friendly
503	Serbia and Montenegro	0–0	(Germany) 2006 W.C. Q
504	Lithuania	1–0	(Germany) 2006 W.C. Q
505	Bosnia and Herzegovina	1–1	(Germany) 2006 W.C. Q
506	Uruguay	2–0	Friendly
507	Canada	2–1	Friendly
508	Serbia and Montenegro	1–1	(Germany) 2006 W.C. Q
509	Belgium	0–2	(Germany) 2006 W.C. Q
510	San Marino	0–6	(Germany) 2006 W.C. Q
511	Slovakia	5–1	(Germany) 2006 W.C. RP
512	Slovakia	1–1	(Germany) 2006 W.C. RP
513	Ivory Coast	3–2	Friendly
514	Russia	0–0	Friendly
515	Egypt	2–0	Friendly
516	Croatia	1–2	Friendly
517	Ukraine	4–0	2006 W.C.
518	Tunisia	3–1	2006 W.C.
519	Saudi Arabia	0–1	2006 W.C.
520	France	1–3	2006 W.C.
521	Iceland	0–0	Friendly
522	Liechtenstein	4–0	(Austria) (Switzerland) 2008 EURO Q
523	Northern Ireland	3–2	(Austria) (Switzerland) 2008 EURO Q
524	Sweden	2–0	(Austria) (Switzerland) 2008 EURO Q
525	Argentina	2–1	Friendly
526	Romania	0–1	Friendly
527	England	2–1	Friendly
528	Denmark	1–0	(Austria) (Switzerland) 2008 EURO Q
529	Iceland	1–0	(Austria) (Switzerland) 2008 EURO Q
530	Latvia	0–2	(Austria) (Switzerland) 2008 EURO Q
531	Liechtenstein	0–2	(Austria) (Switzerland) 2008 EURO Q
532	Greece	2–3	Friendly
533	Iceland	1–1	(Austria) (Switzerland) 2008 EURO Q
534	Latvia	2–0	(Austria) (Switzerland) 2008 EURO Q
535	Denmark	1–3	(Austria) (Switzerland) 2008 EURO Q
536	Finland	0–0	Friendly
537	Sweden	3–0	(Austria) (Switzerland) 2008 EURO Q
538	Northern Ireland	1–0	(Austria) (Switzerland) 2008 EURO Q
539	France	1–0	Friendly
540	Italy	1–0	Friendly
541	Peru	2–1	Friendly
542	United States	1–0	Friendly
543	Russia	4–1	(Austria) (Switzerland) EURO 2008
544	Sweden	1–2	(Austria) (Switzerland) EURO 2008
545	Greece	1–2	(Austria) (Switzerland) EURO 2008
546	Italy	0–0	(Austria) (Switzerland) EURO 2008
547	Russia	0–3	(Austria) (Switzerland) EURO 2008
548	Germany	0–1	(Austria) (Switzerland) EURO 2008
549	Denmark	0–3	Friendly
550	Bosnia and Herzegovina	1–0	(South Africa) 2010 W.C. Q
551	Armenia	4–0	(South Africa) 2010 W.C. Q
552	Estonia	0–3	(South Africa) 2010 W.C. Q
553	Belgium	1–2	(South Africa) 2010 W.C. Q
554	Chile	3–0	Friendly
555	England	2–0	Friendly
556	Turkey	1–0	(South Africa) 2010 W.C. Q
557	Turkey	1–2	(South Africa) 2010 W.C. Q
558	Azerbaijan	0–6	Friendly
559	New Zealand	0–5	(South Africa) 2009 C.C.
560	Iraq	1–0	(South Africa) 2009 C.C.
561	South Africa	2–0	(South Africa) 2009 C.C.
562	United States	0–2	(South Africa) 2009 C.C.
563	South Africa	3–2	(South Africa) 2009 C.C.
564	Macedonia	2–3	Friendly
565	Belgium	5–0	(South Africa) 2010 W.C. Q
566	Estonia	3–0	(South Africa) 2010 W.C. Q
567	Armenia	1–2	(South Africa) 2010 W.C. Q
568	Bosnia and Herzegovina	2–5	(South Africa) 2010 W.C. Q
569	Argentina	2–1	Friendly
570	Austria	1–5	Friendly

=== 2010–2019 ===
133 matches played:

2010–2019
Win Draw Defeat
M	Opponent	Result	Event
571	France	0–2	Friendly
572	Saudi Arabia	3–2	Friendly
573	South Korea	1–0	Friendly
574	Poland	6–0	Friendly
575	Switzerland	0–1	(South Africa) 2010 W.C.
576	Honduras	2–0	(South Africa) 2010 W.C.
577	Chile	1–2	(South Africa) 2010 W.C.
578	Portugal	1–0	(South Africa) 2010 W.C.
579	Paraguay	0–1	(South Africa) 2010 W.C.
580	Germany	0–1	(South Africa) 2010 W.C.
581	Netherlands	0–1	(South Africa) 2010 W.C.
582	Mexico	1–1	Friendly
583	Liechtenstein	0–4	(Poland) (Ukraine) 2012 EURO Q
584	Argentina	4–1	Friendly
585	Lithuania	3–1	(Poland) (Ukraine) 2012 EURO Q
586	Scotland	2–3	(Poland) (Ukraine) 2012 EURO Q
587	Portugal	4–0	Friendly
588	Colombia	1–0	Friendly
589	Czech Republic	2–1	(Poland) (Ukraine) 2012 EURO Q
590	Lithuania	1–3	(Poland) (Ukraine) 2012 EURO Q
591	United States	0–4	Friendly
592	Venezuela	0–3	Friendly
593	Italy	2–1	Friendly
594	Chile	3–2	Friendly
595	Liechtenstein	6–0	(Poland) (Ukraine) 2012 EURO Q
596	Czech Republic	0–2	(Poland) (Ukraine) 2012 EURO Q
597	Scotland	3–1	(Poland) (Ukraine) 2012 EURO Q
598	England	1–0	Friendly
599	Costa Rica	2–2	Friendly
600	Venezuela	5–0	Friendly
601	Serbia	0–2	Friendly
602	South Korea	4–1	Friendly
603	China	1–0	Friendly
604	Italy	1–1	(Poland) (Ukraine) 2012 EURO
605	Republic of Ireland	4–0	(Poland) (Ukraine) 2012 EURO
606	Croatia	0–1	(Poland) (Ukraine) 2012 EURO
607	France	2–0	(Poland) (Ukraine) 2012 EURO
608	Portugal	0–0	(Poland) (Ukraine) 2012 EURO
609	Italy	4–0	(Poland) (Ukraine) 2012 EURO
610	Puerto Rico	1–2	Friendly
611	Saudi Arabia	5–0	Friendly
612	Georgia	0–1	(Brazil) 2014 W.C. Q
613	Belarus	0–4	(Brazil) 2014 W.C. Q
614	France	1–1	(Brazil) 2014 W.C. Q
615	Panama	1–5	Friendly
616	Uruguay	3–1	Friendly
617	Finland	1–1	(Brazil) 2014 W.C. Q
618	France	0–1	(Brazil) 2014 W.C. Q
619	Haiti	2–1	Friendly
620	Republic of Ireland	2–0	Friendly
621	Uruguay	2–1	(Brazil) 2013 CC
622	Tahiti	10–0	(Brazil) 2013 CC
623	Nigeria	0–3	(Brazil) 2013 CC
624	Italy	0–0	(Brazil) 2013 CC
625	Brazil	3–0	(Brazil) 2013 CC
626	Ecuador	0–2	Friendly
627	Finland	0–2	(Brazil) 2014 W.C. Q
628	Chile	2–2	Friendly
629	Belarus	2–1	(Brazil) 2014 W.C. Q
630	Georgia	2–0	(Brazil) 2014 W.C. Q
631 (Note: The game between Equatorial Guinea and Spain in November 2013 was declared void by FIFA a month later due to a procedural error in confirming the use of a local referee. However, the RFEF includes the match and player statistics in its records, and these are usually counted in other sources (e.g. Juanfran Torres scored his only international goal in the fixture).)	Equatorial Guinea	1–2	Friendly
632	South Africa	1–0	Friendly
633	Italy	1–0	Friendly
634	Bolivia	2–0	Friendly
635	El Salvador	0–2	Friendly
636	Netherlands	1–5	(Brazil) 2014 W.C.
637	Chile	0–2	(Brazil) 2014 W.C.
638	Australia	0–3	(Brazil) 2014 W.C.
639	France	1–0	Friendly
640	Macedonia	5–1	(France) 2016 EURO Q
641	Slovakia	2–1	(France) 2016 EURO Q
642	Luxembourg	0–4	(France) 2016 EURO Q
643	Belarus	3–0	(France) 2016 EURO Q
644	Germany	0–1	Friendly
645	Ukraine	1–0	(France) 2016 EURO Q
646	Netherlands	2–0	Friendly
647	Costa Rica	2–1	Friendly
648	Belarus	0–1	(France) 2016 EURO Q
649	Slovakia	2–0	(France) 2016 EURO Q
650	Macedonia	0–1	(France) 2016 EURO Q
651	Luxembourg	4–0	(France) 2016 EURO Q
652	Ukraine	0–1	(France) 2016 EURO Q
653	England	2–0	Friendly
654	Italy	1–1	Friendly
655	Romania	0–0	Friendly
656	Bosnia and Herzegovina	3–1	Friendly
657	South Korea	6–1	Friendly
658	Georgia	0–1	Friendly
659	Czech Republic	1–0	(France) 2016 EURO
660	Turkey	3–0	(France) 2016 EURO
661	Croatia	2–1	(France) 2016 EURO
662	Italy	2–0	(France) 2016 EURO
663	Belgium	0–2	Friendly
664	Liechtenstein	8–0	(Russia) 2018 W.C. Q
665	Italy	1–1	(Russia) 2018 W.C. Q
666	Albania	0–2	(Russia) 2018 W.C. Q
667	Macedonia	4–0	(Russia) 2018 W.C. Q
668	England	2–2	Friendly
669	Israel	4–1	(Russia) 2018 W.C. Q
670	France	0–2	Friendly
671	Colombia	2–2	Friendly
672	Macedonia	1–2	(Russia) 2018 W.C. Q
673	Italy	3–0	(Russia) 2018 W.C. Q
674	Liechtenstein	0–8	(Russia) 2018 W.C. Q
675	Albania	3–0	(Russia) 2018 W.C. Q
676	Israel	0–1	(Russia) 2018 W.C. Q
677	Costa Rica	5–0	Friendly
678	Russia	3–3	Friendly
679	Germany	1–1	Friendly
680	Argentina	6–1	Friendly
681	Switzerland	1–1	Friendly
682	Tunisia	0–1	Friendly
683	Portugal	3–3	(Russia) 2018 W.C.
684	Iran	0–1	(Russia) 2018 W.C.
685	Morocco	2–2	(Russia) 2018 W.C.
686	Russia	1–1	(Russia) 2018 W.C.
687	England	1–2	2018–19 UNL
688	Croatia	6–0	2018–19 UNL
689	Wales	1–4	Friendly
690	England	2–3	2018–19 UNL
691	Croatia	3–2	2018–19 UNL
692	Bosnia and Herzegovina	1–0	Friendly
693	Norway	2–1	(European Union) 2020 EURO Q
694	Malta	0–2	(European Union) 2020 EURO Q
695	Faroe Islands	1–4	(European Union) 2020 EURO Q
696	Sweden	3–0	(European Union) 2020 EURO Q
697	Romania	1–2	(European Union) 2020 EURO Q
698	Faroe Islands	4–0	(European Union) 2020 EURO Q
699	Norway	1–1	(European Union) 2020 EURO Q
700	Sweden	1–1	(European Union) 2020 EURO Q
701	Malta	7–0	(European Union) 2020 EURO Q
702	Romania	5–0	(European Union) 2020 EURO Q

=== 2020–present ===
96 matches played: (Updated 16 Nov 2026)

2020–2029
Win Draw Defeat
M	Opponent	Result	Event
703	Germany	1–1	Nations League
704	Ukraine	4–0	Nations League
705	Portugal	0–0	Friendly
706	Switzerland	1–0	Nations League
707	Ukraine	0–1	Nations League
708	Netherlands	1–1	Friendly
709	Switzerland	1–1	Nations League
710	Germany	6–0	Nations League
711	Greece	1–1	2022 WCQ
712	Georgia	2–1	2022 WCQ
713	Kosovo	3–1	2022 WCQ
714	Portugal	0–0	Friendly
715	Lithuania	4–0	Friendly
716	Sweden	0–0	(European Union) Euro 2020
717	Poland	1–1	(European Union) Euro 2020
718	Slovakia	5–0	(European Union) Euro 2020
719	Croatia	5–3 (a.e.t.)	(European Union) Euro 2020
720	Switzerland	1–1 (3–1 p)	(European Union) Euro 2020
721	Italy	1–1 (2–4 p)	(European Union) Euro 2020
722	Sweden	1–2	2022 WCQ
723	Georgia	4–0	2022 WCQ
724	Kosovo	2–0	2022 WCQ
725	Italy	2–1	(Italy) Nations League Finals
726	France	1–2	(Italy) Nations League Finals
727	Greece	1–0	2022 WCQ
728	Sweden	1–0	2022 WCQ
729	Albania	2–1	Friendly
730	Iceland	5–0	Friendly
731	Portugal	1–1	Nations League
732	Czech Republic	2–2	Nations League
733	Switzerland	1–0	Nations League
734	Czech Republic	2–0	Nations League
735	Switzerland	1–2	Nations League
736	Portugal	1–0	Nations League
737	Jordan	3–1	Friendly
738	Costa Rica	7–0	(Qatar) 2022 World Cup
739	Germany	1–1	(Qatar) 2022 World Cup
740	Japan	1–2	(Qatar) 2022 World Cup
741	Morocco	0–0 (0–3 p)	(Qatar) 2022 World Cup
742	Norway	3–0	2024 EURO Q
743	Scotland	0–2	2024 EURO Q
744	Italy	2–1	(Netherlands) Nations League Finals
745	Croatia	0–0 (5–4 p)	(Netherlands) Nations League Finals
746	Georgia	7–1	2024 EURO Q
747	Cyprus	6–0	2024 EURO Q
748	Scotland	2–0	2024 EURO Q
749	Norway	1–0	2024 EURO Q
750	Cyprus	3–1	2024 EURO Q
751	Georgia	3–1	2024 EURO Q
752	Colombia	0–1	Friendly
753	Brazil	3–3	Friendly
754	Andorra	5–0	Friendly
755	Northern Ireland	5–1	Friendly
756	Croatia	3–0	(Germany) Euro 2024
757	Italy	1–0	(Germany) Euro 2024
758	Albania	1–0	(Germany) Euro 2024
759	Georgia	4–1	(Germany) Euro 2024
760	Germany	2–1	(Germany) Euro 2024
761	France	2–1	(Germany) Euro 2024
762	England	2–1	(Germany) Euro 2024
763	Serbia	0–0	Nations League
764	Switzerland	4–1	Nations League
765	Denmark	1–0	Nations League
766	Serbia	3–0	Nations League
767	Denmark	2–1	Nations League
768	Switzerland	3–2	Nations League
769	Netherlands	2–2	Nations League
770	Netherlands	3–3 (5–4 p)	Nations League
771	France	5–4	(Germany) Nations League Finals
772	Portugal	2–2 (3–5 p)	(Germany) Nations League Finals
773	Bulgaria	3–0	2026 WCQ
774	Turkey	6–0	2026 WCQ
775	Georgia	2–0	2026 WCQ
776	Bulgaria	4–0	2026 WCQ
777	Georgia	4–0	2026 WCQ
778	Turkey	2–2	2026 WCQ
779	Serbia	3–0	Friendly
780	Egypt	0–0	Friendly
781	Iraq	1–1	Friendly
782	Peru	3–1	Friendly
783	Cape Verde	0–0	(Canada) (Mexico) (United States) 2026 World Cup
784	Saudi Arabia	4–0	(Canada) (Mexico) (United States) 2026 World Cup
785	Uruguay	1–0	(Canada) (Mexico) (United States) 2026 World Cup
786	Austria	3–0	(Canada) (Mexico) (United States) 2026 World Cup
787	Portugal	1–0	(Canada) (Mexico) (United States) 2026 World Cup
788	Belgium	2–1	(Canada) (Mexico) (United States) 2026 World Cup
789	France	2–0	(Canada) (Mexico) (United States) 2026 World Cup
790	Argentina	1–0 (a.e.t.)	(Canada) (Mexico) (United States) 2026 World Cup
791	England	3–2	Nations League
792	Croatia	4–1	Nations League
793	Czech Republic	3–1	Nations League
794	Croatia	2–1	Nations League
795	Czech Republic	2–0	Nations League
796	England	2–3	Nations League

== Competitive record ==
=== FIFA World Cup ===
Champions Runners-up Third place Fourth place Worst result

FIFA World Cup record
Year	Round	Position	Pld	W	D*	L	GF	GA
(Uruguay) 1930	did not enter
(Italy) 1934	Quarter-finals	5th	3	1	1	1	4	3
(France) 1938	Withdrew
(Brazil) 1950	Fourth place	4th	6	3	1	2	10	12
(Switzerland) 1954	did not qualify
(Sweden) 1958	did not qualify
(Chile) 1962	Group stage	13th	3	1	0	2	2	3
(England) 1966	Group stage	10th	3	1	0	2	4	5
(Mexico) 1970	did not qualify
(West Germany) 1974	did not qualify
(Argentina) 1978	Group stage	10th	3	1	1	1	2	2
(Spain) 1982	Second group stage	12th	5	1	2	2	4	5
(Mexico) 1986	Quarter-finals	7th	5	3	1	1	11	4
(Italy) 1990	Round of 16	10th	4	2	1	1	6	4
(United States) 1994	Quarter-finals	8th	5	2	2	1	10	6
(France) 1998	Group stage	17th	3	1	1	1	8	4
(South Korea) (Japan) 2002	Quarter-finals	5th	5	3	2	0	10	5
(Germany) 2006	Round of 16	9th	4	3	0	1	9	4
(South Africa) 2010	Champions	1st	7	6	0	1	8	2
(Brazil) 2014	Group stage	23rd	3	1	0	2	4	7
(Russia) 2018	Round of 16	10th	4	1	3	0	7	6
(Qatar) 2022	Round of 16	13th	4	1	2	1	9	3
(Canada) (Mexico) (United States) 2026	Champions	1st	8	7	1	0	14	1
(Morocco) (Spain) (Portugal) 2030	Qualified as co-hosts
(Saudi Arabia) 2034	TBD
Total	2 Titles	16/22	67	31	17	19	108	75

=== UEFA European Championship ===
European Championship record
Year	Round	Position	Pld	W	D*	L	GF	GA
(France) 1960	Withdrew
(Spain) 1964	Champions	1st	2	2	0	0	4	2
(Italy) 1968	did not qualify
(Belgium) 1972	did not qualify
(Socialist Federal Republic of Yugoslavia) 1976	did not qualify
(Italy) 1980	Group stage	7th	3	0	1	2	2	4
(France) 1984	Runners-up	2nd	5	1	3	1	4	5
(West Germany) 1988	Group stage	6th	3	1	0	2	3	5
(Sweden) 1992	did not qualify
(England) 1996	Quarter-finals	6th	4	1	3	0	4	3
(Belgium) (Netherlands) 2000	Quarter-finals	5th	4	2	0	2	7	7
(Portugal) 2004	Group stage	10th	3	1	1	1	2	2
(Austria) (Switzerland) 2008	Champions	1st	6	5	1	0	12	3
(Poland) (Ukraine) 2012	Champions	1st	6	4	2	0	12	1
(France) 2016	Round of 16	10th	4	2	0	2	5	4
(European Union) 2020	Semi-finals	3rd	6	2	4	0	13	6
(Germany) 2024	Champions	1st	7	7	0	0	15	4
(England) (Republic of Ireland) (Scotland) (Wales) 2028	to be determined
(Italy) (Turkey) 2032	to be determined
Total	4 Titles	12/17	53	28	15	10	83	46

*Denotes draws including knockout matches decided via penalty shoot-out.
**Gold background colour indicates that the tournament was won.
***Red border colour indicates that the tournament was held on home soil.

=== UEFA Nations League ===
UEFA Nations League record
League phase												Finals								
Season	LG	GP	Pos	Pld	W	D	L	GF	GA	P/R	RK	Year	Pos	Pld	W	D*	L	GF	GA	Squad
2018–19	A	4	2nd	4	2	0	2	12	7	Same position	7th	(Portugal) 2019	Did not qualify							
2020–21	A	4	1st	6	3	2	1	13	3	Same position	2nd	(Italy) 2021	Runners-up	2	1	0	1	3	3	Squad
2022–23	A	2	1st	6	3	2	1	8	5	Same position	1st	(Netherlands) 2023	Champions	2	1	1	0	2	1	Squad
2024–25	A	4	1st	6	5	1	0	13	4	Same position	2nd	(Germany) 2025	Runners-up	2	1	1	0	7	6	Squad
Total				22	13	5	4	46	19	2nd		Total		6	3	2	1	12	10	1 title

=== FIFA Confederations Cup ===
Confederations Cup record
Year	Round	Position	Pld	W	D*	L	GF	GA
(Saudi Arabia) 1992	UEFA did not participate
(Saudi Arabia) 1995	did not qualify
(Saudi Arabia) 1997	did not qualify
(Mexico) 1999	did not qualify
(South Korea) (Japan) 2001	did not qualify
(France) 2003	did not qualify
(Germany) 2005	did not qualify
(South Africa) 2009	Third place	3rd	5	4	0	1	11	4
(Brazil) 2013	Runners-up	2nd	5	3	1	1	15	4
(Russia) 2017	did not qualify
Total	Runners-up	2/10	10	7	1	2	26	8

=== Summer Olympics ===
Olympic Games record
Year	Host	Round	Pos.	Pld.	W	D	L	GF	GA
1920	(Belgium) Antwerp	Silver medal	2nd	5	4	0	1	9	5
1924	(France) Paris	First round	17th	1	0	0	1	0	1
1928	(Netherlands) Amsterdam	Quarter-finals	6th	3	1	1	1	9	9
1936	(Germany) Berlin	Withdrew							
1948	(United Kingdom) London	did not qualify							
1952	(Finland) Helsinki	did not qualify							
1956	(Australia) Melbourne	did not qualify							
1960	(Italy) Rome	did not qualify							
1964	(Japan) Tokyo	did not qualify							
1968	Mexico City	Quarter-finals	5th	4	2	1	1	4	2
1972	(West Germany) Munich	did not qualify							
1976	(Canada) Montreal	Group stage	13th	2	0	0	2	1	3
1980	(Soviet Union) Moscow	Group stage	10th	3	0	3	0	2	2
1984	(United States) Los Angeles	did not qualify							
1988	(South Korea) Seoul	did not qualify							
1992	(Spain) Barcelona	Gold medal	1st	6	6	0	0	14	2
1996	(United States) Atlanta	Quarter-finals	6th	4	2	1	1	5	7
2000	(Australia) Sydney	Silver medal	2nd	6	4	1	1	12	6
2004	(Greece) Athens	did not qualify							
2008	(China) Beijing	did not qualify							
2012	(United Kingdom) London	Group stage	14th	3	0	1	2	0	2
2016	(Brazil) Rio de Janeiro	did not qualify							
2020	(Japan) Tokyo	Silver medal	2nd	6	3	2	1	9	5
2024	(France) Paris	Gold medal	1st	6	5	0	1	16	9
2028	(United States) Los Angeles	to be determined							
2032	(Australia) Brisbane	to be determined							
Total		2-3-0	12/24	49	27	10	12	82	53

*Denotes draws including knockout matches decided via penalty shoot-out.
**Since 1968, Spain has sent its under-23 national team.

== Venues in Spain ==
Locations that held at least one game.
Locations on Canary Islands
- Updated to 31 March 2026

P	City	Times
1	(Community of Madrid) Madrid	73
2	(Andalusia) Seville	51
3	(Valencian Community) Valencia	35
4	(Catalonia) Barcelona	18
5	(Asturias) Gijón	11
5	(Andalusia) Málaga	11
7	(Valencian Community) Alicante	9
8	(Andalusia) Granada	8
8	(Cantabria) Santander	8
8	(Galicia (Spain)) Vigo	8
11	(Valencian Community) Elche	7
11	(Canary Islands) Las Palmas de Gran Canaria	7
13	(Galicia (Spain)) A Coruña	6
13	(Basque Country (autonomous community)) Bilbao	6
13	(Asturias) Oviedo	6
13	(Balearic Islands) Palma de Mallorca	6
13	(Aragon) Zaragoza	6
18	(Castilla–La Mancha) Albacete	5
18	(Andalusia) Cádiz	5
18	(Region of Murcia) Murcia	5
18	(Castile and León) Valladolid	5
22	(Castile and León) Salamanca	4
22	(Canary Islands) Santa Cruz de Tenerife	4
22	(Valencian Community) Villarreal	4

P	City	Times
25	(Extremadura) Badajoz	3
25	(Andalusia) Huelva	3
25	(Castile and León) León	3
25	(La Rioja) Logroño	3
29	(Valencian Community) Castelló de la Plana	2
29	(Andalusia) Córdoba	2
29	(Catalonia) Cornellà de Llobregat	2
29	(Andalusia) La Línea de la Concepción	2
29	(Community of Madrid) Getafe	2
34	(Andalusia) Almería	1
34	(Extremadura) Cáceres	1
34	(Region of Murcia) Cartagena	1
34	(Andalusia) Jerez de la Frontera	1
34	(Community of Madrid) Leganés	1
34	(Extremadura) Mérida	1
34	(Galicia (Spain)) Pontevedra	1
34	(Basque Country (autonomous community)) San Sebastián	1

== See also ==
- Spain national football team head to head
- Spain national football team records
- Spain women's national football team results
