= Portugal–Spain football rivalry =

Football rivalry between the national football teams of Portugal and Spain

Iberian Derby
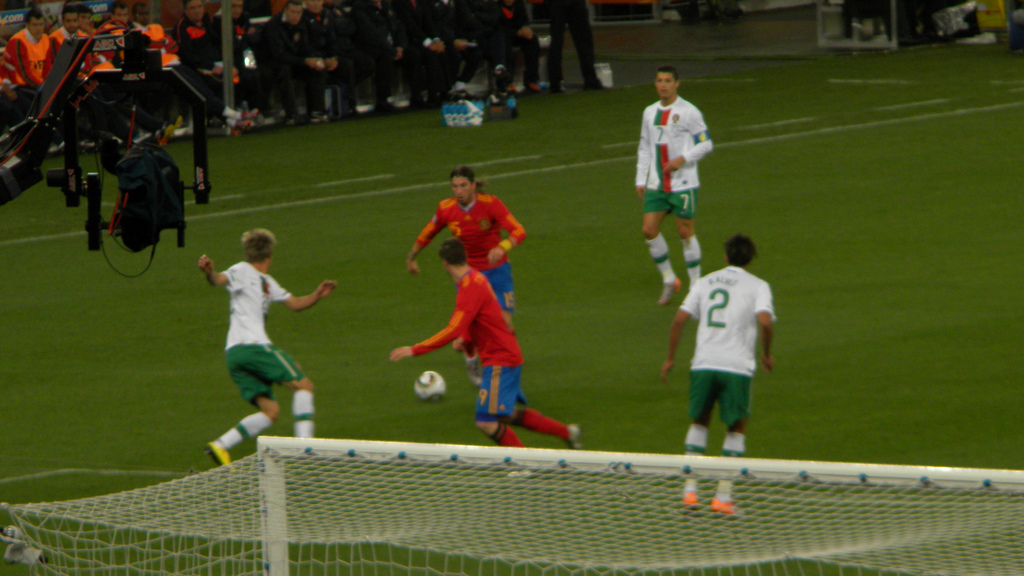
- Sergio Ramos (top center) of Spain tries to pass the ball to Fernando Torres (center) as Portugal's Fábio Coentrão (left), Bruno Alves (right) and Cristiano Ronaldo (top) look on during a match at the 2010 FIFA World Cup.
- Location: Europe
- Teams: Portugal; Spain
- First meeting: 18 December 1921; Friendly; Spain 3–1 Portugal
- Latest meeting: 6 July 2026; FIFA World Cup; Portugal 0–1 Spain

Statistics
- Total meetings: 42
- Most wins: Spain (18)
- Top scorer: Isidro Lángara (7)
- All-time series: Portugal: 6 Draw: 18; Spain: 18
- Largest victory: Spain 9–0 Portugal; 1934 FIFA World Cup qualification (11 March 1934)

The Portugal–Spain football rivalry (popularly known as The Iberian Derby) is one of the oldest football rivalries at a national level. It began on 19 December 1921, when Portugal lost 3–1 away in Madrid in their first ever international friendly game. Spain won several meetings thereafter as well, with the first draw (2–2) only coming in 1926. Portugal's first win came much later (4–1) in 1947.

Both countries have ranked among the highest rated national teams in the world since the 1980s and both have regularly featured in the top 10 ranked teams on FIFA Men's World Rankings. They have met a total of 42 times (of which 13 were competitive) which resulted in 6 victories for Portugal, 18 draws, and 18 victories for Spain.

The countries will co-host the 2030 FIFA World Cup with Morocco.

== Comparison in major tournaments ==
Key

Denotes which team finished better in that particular competition.
DNQ: Did not qualify.
DNP: Did not participate.
TBD: To be determined.

Tournament	Portugal	Spain	Notes
1930 FIFA World Cup	DNP		
1934 FIFA World Cup	DNQ	5th	
1938 FIFA World Cup	DNQ		
1950 FIFA World Cup	DNQ	4th	
1954 FIFA World Cup	DNQ		
1958 FIFA World Cup	DNQ		
Euro 1960	DNQ		
1962 FIFA World Cup	DNQ	12th	
Euro 1964	DNQ	1st	
1966 FIFA World Cup	3rd	10th	
Euro 1968	DNQ		
1970 FIFA World Cup	DNQ		
Euro 1972	DNQ		
1974 FIFA World Cup	DNQ		
Euro 1976	DNQ		
1978 FIFA World Cup	DNQ	10th	
Euro 1980	DNQ	7th	
1982 FIFA World Cup	DNQ	12th	Tournament hosted by Spain.
Euro 1984	7th	2nd	In the group stage, the match ended 1-1.
1986 FIFA World Cup	17th	7th	
Euro 1988	DNQ	6th	
1990 FIFA World Cup	DNQ	10th	
Euro 1992	DNQ	DNQ	
1994 FIFA World Cup	DNQ	8th	
Euro 1996	5th	6th	
1998 FIFA World Cup	DNQ	17th	
Euro 2000	4th	5th	
2002 FIFA World Cup	21st	5th	
Euro 2004	2nd	10th	Tournament hosted by Portugal. In the group stage, Portugal defeated Spain 1–0.
2006 FIFA World Cup	4th	9th	
Euro 2008	7th	1st	
2010 FIFA World Cup	11th	1st	In the Round of 16, Spain defeated Portugal 1–0.
Euro 2012	4th	1st	
2014 FIFA World Cup	18th	23rd	
Euro 2016	1st	10th	
2018 FIFA World Cup	13th	10th	In the group stage, the match ended 3–3.
Euro 2020	13th	3rd	Tournament hosted by multiple countries; Spain hosted some matches.
2022 FIFA World Cup	8th	13th	
Euro 2024	8th	1st	
2026 FIFA World Cup	13th	1st	In the Round of 16, Spain defeated Portugal 1–0.
Euro 2028	TBD	TBD	

== Major tournaments ==
=== 1934 FIFA World Cup qualification ===
11 March 1934

Spain	9–0	Portugal
González 3'; Lángara 13', 14' (pen.), 46', 71', 85'; Regueiro 65', 70'; Ventolrà 68'	(Report)

Estadio Chamartín, Madrid, Spain
Attendance: 50,000
Referee: Raphaël van Praag (Belgium)

18 March 1934

Portugal	1–2	Spain
Silva 10'	(Report)	Lángara 12', 25'

Estádio do Lumiar, Lisbon, Portugal
Attendance: 35,000
Referee: Raphaël van Praag (Belgium)

=== 1950 FIFA World Cup qualification ===
Spain and Portugal met in 1950 FIFA World Cup qualification round with Spain going away with a 5–1 victory at home in the first leg.

2 April 1950

Spain	5–1	Portugal
Zarra 11', 58'; Basora 13'; Panizo 15'; Molowny 65'	Report	Cabrita 36'

Estadio Nuevo Chamartín, Madrid, Spain
Attendance: 80,000
Referee: Reg Leafe (England)

The second leg saw both sides drawing 2–2, meaning Spain qualified for 1950 FIFA World Cup.

9 April 1950

Portugal	2–2	Spain
Travassos 51'; Correia 53'	Report	Zarra 24'; Gaínza 82'

Jamor, Lisbon, Portugal
Attendance: 30,000
Referee: Jack Mowat (Scotland)

=== UEFA Euro 1984 ===
In UEFA Euro 1984 group stage Portugal and Spain were paired together, both sides qualified to the next round as Portugal drew Spain 1–1. António Sousa gave Portugal in 52nd minute, after 21 minutes Santillana equalised for Spain at 73rd minute.

17 June 1984
20:30

Portugal	1–1	Spain
Sousa 52'	Report	Santillana 73'

Stade Vélodrome, Marseille
Attendance: 24,364
Referee: Michel Vautrot (France)

=== UEFA Euro 2004 ===
Portugal and Spain faced off in group stage of the UEFA Euro 2004 hosted by Portugal. In a game where both teams must win to qualify for the knockout stage, Portugal won the game 1–0 as half-time substitute Nuno Gomes scored a goal from 20 yards, giving Portugal their first ever victory against Spain in a major tournament, eliminating Spain on goals scored, and handed the other knockout berth to eventual winners Greece. This was also Portugal's first victory over Spain since 1981.

20 June 2004
19:45

Spain	0–1	Portugal
	Report	Nuno Gomes 57'

Estádio José Alvalade, Lisbon
Attendance: 47,491
Referee: Anders Frisk (Sweden)

=== 2010 FIFA World Cup ===
Spain defeated Portugal 1–0 in the Iberian derby to progress to the quarter-finals en route to their first world championship. The game took place on 29 June 2010 at the Cape Town Stadium. Spain dominated the game with a ball possession ratio of 62% and several opportunities, but had to endure a pair of missed chances by the Portuguese in the first half, including one by Hugo Almeida which nearly resulted in a goal. In the second half, the Portuguese attacking threat decreased, and the entry of Fernando Llorente for Fernando Torres on the field brought new energy to the Spanish team. The only goal of the match came on the 63rd minute as David Villa picked up a brilliant pass by Xavi, having his first shot saved, but then lifted the rebound into the roof of the net.

29 June 2010
20:30 CET

Spain	1–0	Portugal
David Villa 63'	Report

Cape Town Stadium, Cape Town
Attendance: 62,955
Referee: Héctor Baldassi (Argentina)

=== 2018 FIFA World Cup ===
Spain faced Portugal in their opening match of Group B. Cristiano Ronaldo gave Portugal an early lead from the spot-kick in 4th minute of the match after deceiving Nacho inside the box. In the 24th minute, Diego Costa equalised for Spain after scoring past the Portuguese defence. Isco then saw his shot thumping against the post. Ronaldo gave Portugal lead once again in 44th minute after Spanish keeper David de Gea was unable to handle the shot. Costa once again equalised for Spanish side in the 55th minute. Nacho redeemed himself after scoring a superb half-volley from outside the box at 58th minute. Gerard Piqué brought down Ronaldo outside the box at 86th minute, Ronaldo scored the free kick to equalise the game at 3–3, earning his first-ever World Cup hat-trick.

15 June 2018
21:00 MSK (UTC+3)

Portugal	3–3	Spain
Ronaldo 4' (pen.), 44', 88'	Report	Costa 24', 55'; Nacho 58'

Fisht Olympic Stadium, Sochi
Attendance: 43,866
Referee: Gianluca Rocchi (Italy)

=== 2022–23 UEFA Nations League A ===
Both teams were drawn together in Group 2 of the 2022–23 UEFA Nations League A. The first leg was played at Estadio Benito Villamarín on 2 June where the game ended 1–1, with Alvaro Morata of Spain and Ricardo Horta of Portugal scoring the goal in that match. The second leg was played at Estádio Municipal de Braga on 27 September in a game where both teams have to win to secure a spot in the 2023 UEFA Nations League Finals. Had the match ended in a draw, Portugal would have advanced. In the end, Spain won 1–0 on a winning goal scored by Morata late in the game in the 88th minute for their first win at a Portuguese ground in 19 years.

2 June 2022
20:45

Spain	1–1	Portugal
Morata 25'	Report	Horta 82'

Benito Villamarín, Seville
Attendance: 41,236
Referee: Michael Oliver (England)

27 September 2022
20:45 (19:45 UTC+1)

Portugal	0–1	Spain
	Report	Morata 88'

Estádio Municipal, Braga
Attendance: 28,196
Referee: Daniele Orsato (Italy)

=== 2025 UEFA Nations League final ===
The teams met at the 2025 UEFA Nations League final, the second UEFA Nations League final for Portugal and the third (both overall and in a row) for Spain.

8 June 2025
21:00

Portugal	2–2 (a.e.t.)	Spain
Mendes 26'; Ronaldo 61'	Report	Zubimendi 21'; Oyarzabal 45'
Penalties
Ramos (penalty scored); Vitinha (penalty scored); Fernandes (penalty scored); Mendes (penalty scored); R. Neves (penalty scored)	5–3	(penalty scored) Merino; (penalty scored) Baena; (penalty scored) Isco; (penalty missed) Morata

Allianz Arena, Munich
Attendance: 65,852
Referee: Sandro Schärer (Switzerland)

=== 2026 FIFA World Cup ===
July 6, 2026
2:00 p.m. UTC−5

Portugal	0–1	Spain
	(Note: "Portugal vs Spain | Round of 16 | FIFA World Cup 2026". FIFA. Retrieved July 6, 2026.; "Match Report – Round of 16 – Portugal v. Spain". FIFA. July 6, 2026. Retrieved July 6, 2026.; "Post match summary report – Round of 16 – Portugal v. Spain". FIFA. July 6, 2026. Retrieved July 7, 2026.)	Merino 90+1'

AT&T Stadium, Arlington
Attendance: 70,649
Referee: Anthony Taylor (England)

== List of matches ==
Legend

No.	Date	Location	Competition	Score			Winner
1	18 December 1921	(Spain) Madrid	Friendly	Spain	3–1	Portugal	Spain
2	17 December 1922	(Portugal) Lisbon	Friendly	Portugal	1–2	Spain	Spain
3	16 December 1923	(Spain) Seville	Friendly	Spain	3–0	Portugal	Spain
4	17 May 1925	(Portugal) Lisbon	Friendly	Portugal	0–2	Spain	Spain
5	10 January 1928	(Portugal) Lisbon	Friendly	Portugal	2–2	Spain	Draw
6	17 March 1929	(Spain) Seville	Friendly	Spain	5–0	Portugal	Spain
7	30 November 1930	(Portugal) Porto	Friendly	Portugal	0–1	Spain	Spain
8	2 April 1933	(Spain) Vigo	Friendly	Spain	3–0	Portugal	Spain
9	11 March 1934	(Spain) Madrid	1934 FIFA World Cup qualification	Spain	9–0	Portugal	Spain
10	18 March 1934	(Portugal) Lisbon	1934 FIFA World Cup qualification	Portugal	1–2	Spain	Spain
11	5 May 1935	(Portugal) Lisbon	Friendly	Portugal	3–3	Spain	Draw
12	12 January 1941	(Portugal) Lisbon	Friendly	Portugal	2–2	Spain	Spain
13	16 March 1941	(Spain) Bilbao	Friendly	Spain	5–1	Portugal	Spain
14	13 March 1945	(Portugal) Lisbon	Friendly	Portugal	2–2	Spain	Draw
15	6 May 1945	(Spain) La Coruña	Friendly	Spain	4–2	Portugal	Spain
16	26 January 1947	(Portugal) Lisbon	Friendly	Portugal	4–1	Spain	Portugal
17	20 March 1948	(Spain) Madrid	Friendly	Spain	2–0	Portugal	Spain
18	20 March 1949	(Portugal) Lisbon	Friendly	Portugal	1–1	Spain	Draw
19	2 April 1950	(Spain) Madrid	1950 FIFA World Cup qualification	Spain	5–1	Portugal	Spain
20	9 April 1950	(Portugal) Lisbon	1950 FIFA World Cup qualification	Portugal	2–2	Spain	Draw
21	3 June 1956	(Portugal) Lisbon	Friendly	Portugal	3–1	Spain	Portugal
22	13 April 1958	(Spain) Madrid	Friendly	Spain	1–0	Portugal	Draw
23	15 November 1964	(Portugal) Porto	Friendly	Portugal	2–1	Spain	Portugal
24	26 September 1979	(Spain) Vigo	Friendly	Spain	1–1	Portugal	Draw
25	20 June 1981	(Portugal) Porto	Friendly	Portugal	2–0	Spain	Portugal
26	17 June 1984	(France) Marseille	UEFA Euro 1984	Portugal	1–1	Spain	Draw
27	16 January 1991	(Spain) Castellón	Friendly	Spain	1–1	Portugal	Draw
28	15 January 1992	(Portugal) Torres Novas	Friendly	Portugal	0–0	Spain	Draw
29	19 January 1994	(Spain) Vigo	Friendly	Spain	2–2	Portugal	Draw
30	13 February 2002	(Spain) Barcelona	Friendly	Spain	1–1	Portugal	Draw
31	6 September 2003	(Portugal) Guimarães	Friendly	Portugal	0–3	Spain	Spain
32	20 June 2004	(Portugal) Lisbon	UEFA Euro 2004	Spain	0–1	Portugal	Portugal
33	29 June 2010	(South Africa) Cape Town	2010 FIFA World Cup	Spain	1–0	Portugal	Spain
34	17 November 2010	(Portugal) Lisbon	Friendly	Portugal	4–0	Spain	Portugal
35	27 June 2012	(Ukraine) Donetsk	UEFA Euro 2012	Portugal	0–0 (a.e.t.) (2–4 p)	Spain	Draw
36	15 June 2018	(Russia) Sochi	2018 FIFA World Cup	Portugal	3–3	Spain	Draw
37	7 October 2020	(Portugal) Lisbon	Friendly	Portugal	0–0	Spain	Draw
38	4 June 2021	(Spain) Madrid	Friendly	Spain	0–0	Portugal	Draw
39	2 June 2022	(Spain) Seville	2022–23 UEFA Nations League	Spain	1–1	Portugal	Draw
40	27 September 2022	(Portugal) Braga	2022–23 UEFA Nations League	Portugal	0–1	Spain	Spain
41	8 June 2025	(Germany) Munich	2025 UEFA Nations League Finals	Portugal	2–2 (a.e.t.) (5–3 p)	Spain	Draw
42	6 July 2026	(United States) Arlington	2026 FIFA World Cup	Portugal	0–1	Spain	Spain

=== Unofficial matches ===
An additional three matches have been played between the countries which are not considered official (although are included in some media articles relating to the rivalry and in some statistical tallies of caps for the players involved):

- In May 1927, Spain played a friendly against Portugal in Madrid on the same day as they played Italy in Rome. The squad for the Italy game was more experienced and considered to be stronger, while several players in the Portugal match made their debuts; consequently the Spain team is considered to have been equivalent to its B team (although they won their match while the A team lost theirs) and thus not a full international.
- Following the outbreak of the Spanish Civil War in 1936, no official matches were played by Spain until 1941. The vast majority of the squad in 1936 either originated from the Basque provinces, or played for FC Barcelona in Catalonia, both of which were initially within Republican territory in the conflict. The Basque players formed their own quasi-national team and left Spain to play a long series of exhibition matches on tour around Eastern Europe and Latin America to provide funds and exposure for local causes, and Barcelona did likewise; most of the players in both groups never returned. Back in Spain, as the Nationalist side took control of more of the country, General Franco saw the opportunity to use football as a positive propaganda tool, and arranged for a match to be played in his home region of Galicia against Portugal, whose leader Salazar was supportive of Francoist Spain. Recognition was granted by FIFA at short notice and the match took place in Vigo in November 1937. In contrast to Portugal's settled squad, the Spain pool was hastily assembled from the best available players in Nationalist areas, and Portugal won for their first victory over their neighbours. A return match was arranged for the following January in Lisbon, also won by Portugal, and which attracted attention when three local players refused to give the Roman salute before kick-off; they were initially imprisoned, but were soon released due to the political influence held by the hierarchy of the club they played for, Belenenses.

No.	Date	Venue	Competition	Score			Winner
N/A (Note: Taking all matches into account, this would have been the 7th meeting.)	29 May 1927	(Spain) Madrid	Unofficial friendly	Spain B	2–0	Portugal	Spain
N/A (Note: Taking all matches into account, this would have been the 13th meeting.)	28 November 1937	(Spain) Vigo	Unofficial friendly	Spain	1–2	Portugal	Portugal
N/A (Note: Taking all matches into account, this would have been the 14th meeting.)	30 January 1938	(Portugal) Lisbon	Unofficial friendly	Portugal	1–0	Spain	Portugal

== Statistics ==
=== Overall ===
As of 5 July 2026

Competition	Matches	Wins		Draws	Goals	
Competition	Matches	Portugal	Spain	Draws	Portugal	Spain
FIFA World Cup^{*}	7	0	5	2	7	23
UEFA European Championship	3	1	0	2^{**}	2	1
UEFA Nations League	3	0	1	2^{***}	3	4
All competitions	13	1	6	6	12	28
Friendly	29	5	12	12	35	52
All matches	42	6	18	18	47	80

- ^*Matches for FIFA World Cup includes qualification matches from 1934 and 1950 edition.
- ^**Spain defeated Portugal 4–2 on penalties at the UEFA Euro 2012 semi-finals.
- ^***Portugal defeated Spain 5–3 on penalties at the 2025 UEFA Nations League final.

=== Trophies ===
Competition	Titles	
Competition	Spain	Portugal
FIFA World Cup	2	0
UEFA European Championship	4	1
UEFA Nations League	1	2
Summer Olympics	2	0
All competitions	9	3

=== Top goalscorers ===
As of 5 July 2026

Rank	Player	FIFA World Cup	FIFA World Cup qualification	UEFA European Championship	UEFA European Championship qualifying	UEFA Nations League	Friendly	All matches
1	(Spain) Isidro Lángara^{5}	—	7	—	—	—	2	9
2	(Portugal) Fernando Peyroteo	—	—	—	—	—	7	7
3	(Spain) Telmo Zarra	—	3	—	—	—	3	6
4	(Portugal) Cristiano Ronaldo	3	0	0	0	1	0	4
5	(Portugal) Francisco Palmeiro	—	—	—	—	—	3	3
5	(Portugal) José Travassos	—	1	—	—	—	2	3
5	(Spain) Epifanio Fernández	—	—	—	—	—	3	3
5	(Spain) César Rodríguez	—	—	—	—	—	3	3
5	(Spain) Gaspar Rubio	—	—	—	—	—	3	3
5	(Spain) José Luis Zabala	—	—	—	—	—	3	3

- ^5Player scored 5 goals.

== See also ==
- Portugal–Spain relations
