= Sandro Schärer =

Swiss football referee (born 1988)

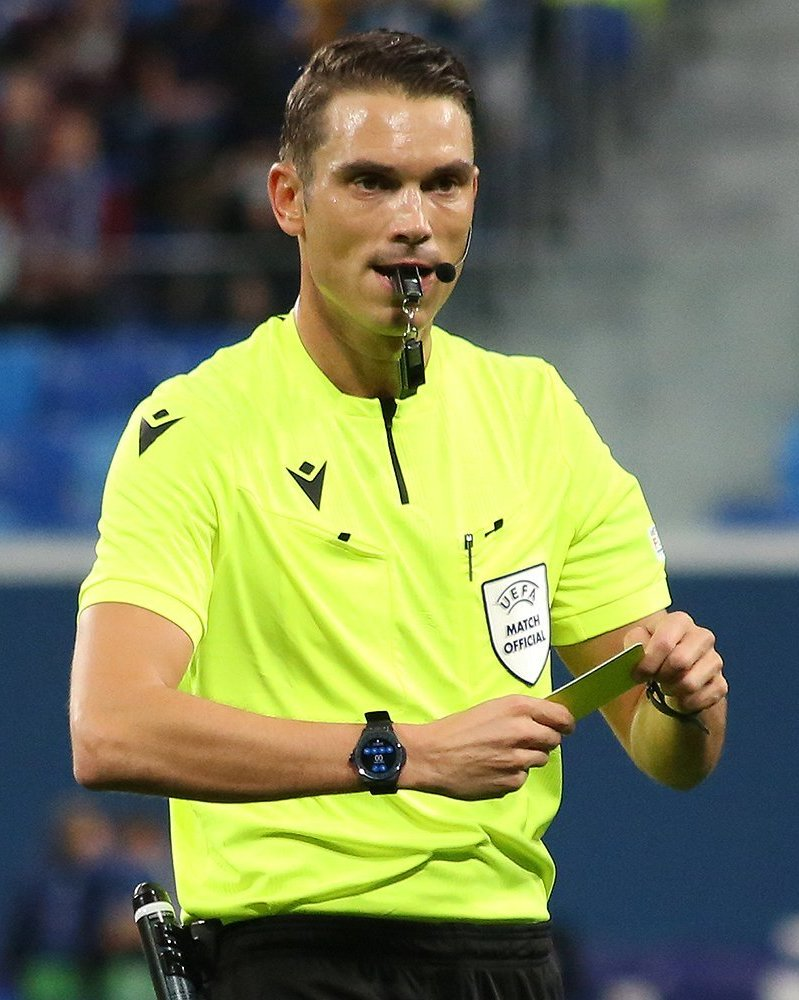
- Schärer in 2021
- Full name: Sandro Schärer
- Born: 6 June 1988 (age 38); Schübelbach, Switzerland

Domestic
Years	League	Role
2011–	Swiss Challenge League	Referee
2013–	Swiss Super League	Referee

International
Years	League	Role
2015–	FIFA listed	Referee

Sandro Schärer (born 6 June 1988) is a Swiss professional football referee. He has been a full international for FIFA since 2015.

== Refereeing career ==
After completing his referee training in 2005, Schärer quickly rose through the ranks and, by 2011 at the age of 23, was already officiating matches in the Challenge League, Switzerland's second-highest league. In 2013, he made his Super League refereeing debut in a match between FC Lausanne-Sport and FC Thun.

Schärer refereed the 2019–20 Swiss Cup final between FC Basel and Young Boys.

Schärer made his international debut in a qualifying tournament for the 2015 U–17 EURO in Bulgaria. That same year, he made his first international appearance at senior level, officiating in a 2015–16 Europa League qualifier between IF Elfsborg and FC Lahti.

He officiated his first senior international match in May 2017, a friendly between Italy and San Marino. Since then, he has regularly officiated matches in the group stages of the Europa League and the qualifying rounds of the Champions League.

In October 2020, he made his debut in Champions League refereeing, officiating a group stage match between FC Barcelona and Ferencváros. He became the first Swiss referee to officiate in a Champions League group stage since Massimo Busacca in 2011.

Schärer was nominated as one of 12 referees for the group stage of the 2021 U–21 EURO in Hungary and Slovenia. He officiated three matches, including the semi-final match between Germany and Netherlands.

Schärer officiated the 2024 UEFA Super Cup at the National Stadium in Warsaw, in which Real Madrid defeated Atalanta 2–0.

On 8 June 2025, Schärer officiated the 2025 UEFA Nations League final, which ended in a Portugal victory over Spain in the Allianz Arena of Munich.

== See also ==
- List of football referees

Sporting positions (Switzerland) Sandro Schärer
Preceded by 2023 UEFA Nations League Final (Germany) Felix Zwayer	2025 UEFA Nations League final	Succeeded by 2027 UEFA Nations League final (N/A) to be determined
Preceded by 2023 UEFA Super Cup (France) François Letexier	2024 UEFA Super Cup	Succeeded by 2025 UEFA Super Cup (Portugal) João Pinheiro
