= 2025 UEFA Nations League final =

- Match programme cover
- Event: 2025 UEFA Nations League Finals
Portugal	Spain
2	2
- After extra time Portugal won 5–3 on penalties
- Date: 8 June 2025
- Venue: Munich Football Arena, Munich
- Man of the Match: Nuno Mendes (Portugal)
- Referee: Sandro Schärer (Switzerland)
- Attendance: 65,852
- Weather: Partly cloudy night 15 °C (59 °F); 63% humidity

The 2025 UEFA Nations League final was a football match that determined the winners of the final tournament of the 2024–25 UEFA Nations League. It was the fourth final of the international football competition involving the men's national teams of the member associations of UEFA. The match was held on 8 June 2025 at the Munich Football Arena in Munich, Germany, between Portugal and defending champions Spain. It was the first Iberian final and first final contested between two former winners of the competition.

Portugal won the match 5–3 on penalties, following a 2–2 draw after extra time, for their second UEFA Nations League title. In doing so, they became the first team to win multiple Nations League titles.

This was the last match featuring Portuguese forward Diogo Jota, who died in a car accident less than a month later, on 3 July 2025.

== Background ==
This match was the first UEFA Nations League final featuring two past finalists, with Portugal winning the inaugural final in 2019 over the Netherlands and Spain playing in the two finals afterwards; they lost their first in 2021 against France before winning over Croatia on penalties two years later.

This was the 41st Iberian Derby, with Spain winning 17, drawing 17, and Portugal winning six.

=== Previous finals ===
Team	Previous final appearances
Portugal	1 (2019)
Spain	2 (2021, 2023)

== Venue ==
The Munich Football Arena was chosen by the German Football Association as one of the two venues for the Nations League Finals, along with the MHPArena. The stadium, which opened in 2005, is the home stadium of Bayern Munich, and hosted matches at the 2006 FIFA World Cup, UEFA Euro 2020 and UEFA Euro 2024. The stadium had just hosted the UEFA Champions League final eight days before this match, in which four Portuguese players—Gonçalo Ramos, João Neves, Vitinha, and Nuno Mendes—and one Spanish player (Fabián Ruiz) won the UEFA Champions League title with Paris Saint-Germain.

== Route to the final ==
Note: In all results below, the score of the finalist is given first (H: home; A: away; N: neutral).

Portugal				Round	Spain			
Opponent	Result			League phase	Opponent	Result		
Croatia	2–1 (H)			Matchday 1	Serbia	0–0 (A)		
Scotland	2–1 (H)			Matchday 2	Switzerland	4–1 (A)		
Poland	3–1 (A)			Matchday 3	Denmark	1–0 (H)		
Scotland	0–0 (A)			Matchday 4	Serbia	3–0 (H)		
Poland	5–1 (H)			Matchday 5	Denmark	2–1 (A)		
Croatia	1–1 (A)			Matchday 6	Switzerland	3–2 (H)		
Group A1 winners: Pos / Team / Pld / Pts; 1 / Portugal / 6 / 14; 2 / Croatia / 6 / 8; 3 / Scotland (R) / 6 / 7; 4 / Poland (R) / 6 / 4; Source: UEFA (R) Relegated				Final standings	Group A4 winners: Pos / Team / Pld / Pts; 1 / Spain / 6 / 16; 2 / Denmark / 6 / 8; 3 / Serbia (O) / 6 / 6; 4 / Switzerland (R) / 6 / 2; Source: UEFA (O) Play-off winners; (R) Relegated			
Opponent	Agg.	1st leg	2nd leg	Knockout stage	Opponent	Agg.	1st leg	2nd leg
Denmark	5–3	0–1 (A)	5–2 (a.e.t.) (H)	Quarter-finals	Netherlands	5–5 (5–4 p)	2–2 (A)	3–3 (a.e.t.) (H)
Germany	2–1 (N)			Semi-finals	France	5–4 (N)		

== Match ==
=== Summary ===
In the 21st minute Spain went in front when Martín Zubimendi slotted into an empty net from close range after Lamine Yamal's ball into the box from the right caused confusion in the Portuguese defence. It was 1–1 in the 26th minute when Nuno Mendes scored with a low finish to the right corner from the left of the penalty area. Just before half-time, Mikel Oyarzabal finished low to the left corner after a pass from Pedri to put Spain back in front. Cristiano Ronaldo equalised in the 61st minute with a right foot volley finish after a deflected cross from Nuno Mendes from the left fell to him from close range. The match went to extra-time and finished 2–2 with the game going to a penalty shoot-out. All penalties were scored until Álvaro Morata saw his effort to the left saved by Diogo Costa. Rúben Neves then scored low to the left corner to win the game for Portugal 5–3 on penalties.

=== Details ===
8 June 2025
21:00 UTC+2

Portugal	2–2 (a.e.t.)	Spain
Mendes 26'; Ronaldo 61'	Report	Zubimendi 21'; Oyarzabal 45'
Penalties
Ramos (penalty scored); Vitinha (penalty scored); Fernandes (penalty scored); Mendes (penalty scored); R. Neves (penalty scored)	5–3	(penalty scored) Merino; (penalty scored) Baena; (penalty scored) Isco; (penalty missed) Morata

Munich Football Arena , Munich
Attendance: 65,852
Referee: Sandro Schärer (Switzerland)

Portugal	Spain

GK	1	Diogo Costa
RB	15	João Neves		(substituted off) 46'
CB	3	Rúben Dias
CB	14	Gonçalo Inácio	(yellow card) 19'	(substituted off) 74'
LB	25	Nuno Mendes	(yellow card) 100'
CM	10	Bernardo Silva		(substituted off) 74'
CM	23	Vitinha
RW	20	Pedro Neto	(yellow card) 82'	(substituted off) 106'
AM	8	Bruno Fernandes
LW	26	Francisco Conceição		(substituted off) 46'
CF	7	Cristiano Ronaldo (c)		(substituted off) 88'
Substitutions:
DF	2	Nélson Semedo		(substituted on) 46'
MF	18	Rúben Neves		(substituted on) 46'
DF	13	Renato Veiga		(substituted on) 74'
FW	17	Rafael Leão		(substituted on) 74'
FW	9	Gonçalo Ramos		(substituted on) 88'
FW	21	Diogo Jota		(substituted on) 106'
Manager:
(Spain) Roberto Martínez			(yellow card) 110'

GK	23	Unai Simón (c)
RB	14	Óscar Mingueza		(substituted off) 92'
CB	3	Robin Le Normand	(yellow card) 90+1'
CB	12	Dean Huijsen
LB	24	Marc Cucurella
CM	20	Pedri		(substituted off) 75'
CM	18	Martín Zubimendi
CM	8	Fabián Ruiz	(yellow card) 33'	(substituted off) 75'
RF	19	Lamine Yamal		(substituted off) 106'
CF	21	Mikel Oyarzabal		(substituted off) 111'
LF	11	Nico Williams		(substituted off) 92'
Substitutions:
MF	22	Isco		(substituted on) 75'
MF	6	Mikel Merino		(substituted on) 75'
MF	16	Álex Baena	(yellow card) 100'	(substituted on) 92'
DF	2	Pedro Porro	(yellow card) 110'	(substituted on) 92'
FW	15	Yéremy Pino		(substituted on) 106'
FW	7	Álvaro Morata		(substituted on) 111'
Manager:
Luis de la Fuente

Man of the Match:
Nuno Mendes (Portugal)

Assistant referees:
Jonas Erni (Switzerland)
Susann Küng (Switzerland) (Note: Stéphane de Almeida (Switzerland) was originally appointed as an assistant referee for the match, but was removed due to his Portuguese ancestry and replaced by Susann Küng.)
Fourth official:
Serdar Gözübüyük (Netherlands)
Video assistant referee:
Fedayi San (Switzerland)
Assistant video assistant referees:
Dennis Higler (Netherlands)
Pol van Boekel (Netherlands)

Match rules

- 90 minutes
- 30 minutes of extra time if necessary
- Penalty shoot-out if scores still level
- Maximum of fifteen named substitutes
- Maximum of five substitutions, with a sixth allowed in extra time
- Maximum of three substitution opportunities, with a fourth allowed in extra time

=== Statistics ===
First half
Statistic	Portugal	Spain
Goals scored	1	2
Total shots	2	7
Shots on target	1	2
Saves	0	0
Ball possession	42%	58%
Corner kicks	1	2
Fouls committed	5	7
Offsides	1	0
Yellow cards	1	1
Red cards	0	0

Second half
Statistic	Portugal	Spain
Goals scored	1	0
Total shots	3	5
Shots on target	1	3
Saves	3	0
Ball possession	36%	64%
Corner kicks	1	2
Fouls committed	5	6
Offsides	2	3
Yellow cards	1	1
Red cards	0	0

Extra time
Statistic	Portugal	Spain
Goals scored	0	0
Total shots	2	4
Shots on target	0	1
Saves	1	0
Ball possession	43%	57%
Corner kicks	1	0
Fouls committed	4	6
Offsides	1	0
Yellow cards	2	2
Red cards	0	0

Overall
Statistic	Portugal	Spain
Goals scored	2	2
Total shots	7	16
Shots on target	2	6
Saves	4	0
Ball possession	40%	60%
Corner kicks	3	4
Fouls committed	14	19
Offsides	4	3
Yellow cards	4	4
Red cards	0	0

== Post-match ==
Portugal's win marked their second UEFA Nations League title, and third major title overall, becoming the first team to win multiple Nations League titles. The win also gave manager Roberto Martinez his first trophy in charge of Portugal. Spain's loss marked their first defeat in a final since the 2021 UEFA Nations League final, and their second defeat in a final ever. The match was also Luis de la Fuente's second defeat as manager of Spain.

The match would turn out to be the last for Portugal forward Diogo Jota, as he was killed in a car accident on 3 July 2025, just 25 days after the final.

== Death of spectator ==
During the first half of extra time, a spectator died after falling from the second tier of the main stand of the Allianz Arena. The man fell onto the seating area below, and was attended to by paramedics and stadium personnel. However, the man succumbed to his injuries and was pronounced dead at 00:06 local time on 9 June. The match was not interrupted during the incident. Players and coaches from both teams offered condolences during the post-match press conferences.
