= Spain national football team records and statistics =

The following details the Spain national football team records.

== Individual records ==
=== Player records ===
==== Nationwide ====
- Most hat-tricks scored: 3 – Fernando Torres & David Villa
- Most consecutive games with at least one goal: 6 – David Villa
- Top scorer in World Cup finals: 9 – David Villa
- Most goals scored in one World Cup: 5 – Emilio Butragueño (1986), David Villa (2010) & Mikel Oyarzabal (2026)
- Most consecutive matches scored in at World Cup: 4 – David Villa (2010)
- Top scorer in European Championship finals: 7 – Álvaro Morata
- Most goals scored in one European Championship: 4 – David Villa (2008)
- Top scorer in Confederations Cup finals: 8 – Fernando Torres
- Most goals scored in one Confederations Cup: 5 – Fernando Torres (2013)
- Top scorer in UEFA Nations League finals: 6 – Ferran Torres
- Most goals scored in one UEFA Nations League: 6 – Ferran Torres (2020–21)

==== Most caps ====
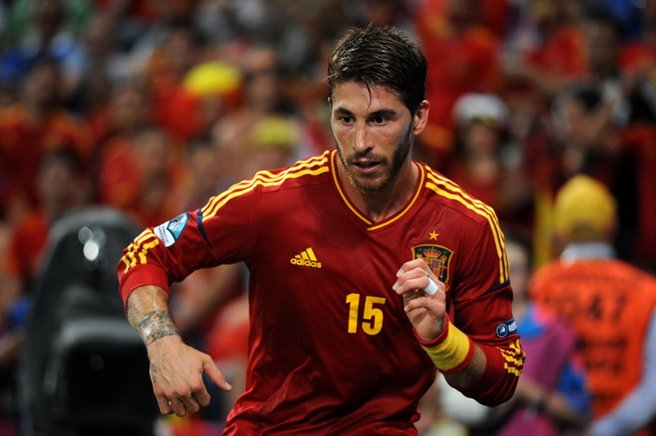
Sergio Ramos is the most capped player in the history of the national team, with a record of 180 matches.

As of 6 October 2026, the players with the most caps for Spain are:

Rank	Player	Career	Caps	Goals
1	Sergio Ramos	2005–2021	180	23
2	Iker Casillas	2000–2016	167	0
3	Sergio Busquets	2009–2022	143	2
4	Xavi	2000–2014	133	13
5	Andrés Iniesta	2006–2018	131	13
6	Andoni Zubizarreta	1985–1998	126	0
7	David Silva	2006–2018	125	35
8	Xabi Alonso	2003–2014	114	16
9	Cesc Fàbregas	2006–2016	110	15
9	Fernando Torres	2003–2014	110	38
11	Gerard Piqué	2009–2018	102	5
11	Raúl	1996–2006	102	44
13	Carles Puyol	2000–2013	100	3
14	David Villa	2005–2017	98	59
15	Jordi Alba	2011–2023	93	9
16	Fernando Hierro	1989–2002	89	29
17	**Álvaro Morata**	**2014–**	**87**	**37**
18	José Antonio Camacho	1975–1988	81	0
18	Santi Cazorla	2008–2019	81	15
20	Rafael Gordillo	1978–1988	75	3
21	**Rodri**	**2018–**	**74**	**5**
22	Koke	2013–2022	70	0
23	Emilio Butragueño	1984–1992	69	26
23	Carlos Marchena	2002–2011	69	2
23	**Unai Simón**	**2020–**	**69**	**0**
26	Luis Arconada	1976–1986	68	0
27	**Ferran Torres**	**2020–**	**66**	**25**
27	Míchel	1985–1992	66	21
29	Pedro	2010–2017	65	17
30	**Mikel Oyarzabal**	**2020–**	**64**	**31**
31	Luis Enrique	1991–2002	62	12
31	Miguel Angel Nadal	1991–2002	62	3
33	**Dani Olmo**	**2019–**	**61**	**12**
34	Joan Capdevila	2002–2011	60	4
34	Víctor Muñoz	1981–1988	60	3
36	Raúl Albiol	2007–2021	58	0

- **Bold** denotes players still active at international level for the national team.

===== Oldest and youngest =====
- Youngest player: **16 years, 57 days** – Lamine Yamal vs Georgia, UEFA Euro 2024 qualifying, 8 September 2023
- Oldest player: **38 years, 231 days** – Jesús Navas vs France, UEFA Euro 2024, 9 July 2024
- Oldest debutant: **34 years, 224 days** – Ferenc Puskás vs Morocco, 1962 FIFA World Cup CAF–UEFA qualification play-off, 12 November 1961
- Largest age difference between two players in the same match: **21 years, 234 days** – Jesús Navas and Lamine Yamal vs Cyprus, UEFA Euro 2024 qualifying, 16 November 2023

==== Longest careers ====
Spanish players with the longest span between first and last cap:

Player	First match	Last match	Days	Caps
Sergio Ramos	26 Mar 2005	31 Mar 2021	5,849	180
Iker Casillas	3 Jun 2000	1 Jun 2016	5,842	167
Ricardo Zamora	28 Aug 1920	23 Feb 1936	5,657	46
Luis Suárez	30 Jan 1957	12 Apr 1972	5,551	32
Jesús Navas	14 Nov 2009	9 Jul 2024	5,351	56
Paco Gento	18 May 1955	15 Oct 1969	5,264	43
Raúl Albiol	13 Oct 2007	8 Sep 2021	5,079	58
Sergio Busquets	1 Apr 2009	6 Dec 2022	4,997	143
Xavi	15 Nov 2000	13 Jun 2014	4,958	133
Andoni Zubizarreta	23 Jan 1985	24 Jun 1998	4,900	126

==== Most goals ====
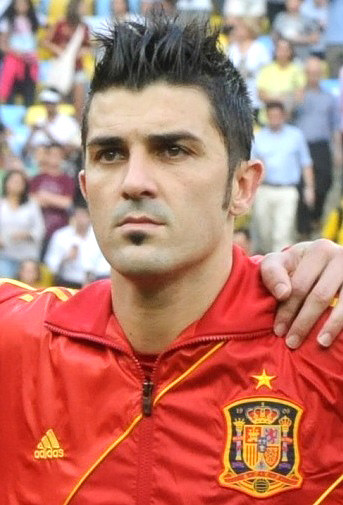
David Villa is Spain's all-time leading scorer with a tally of 59 goals.

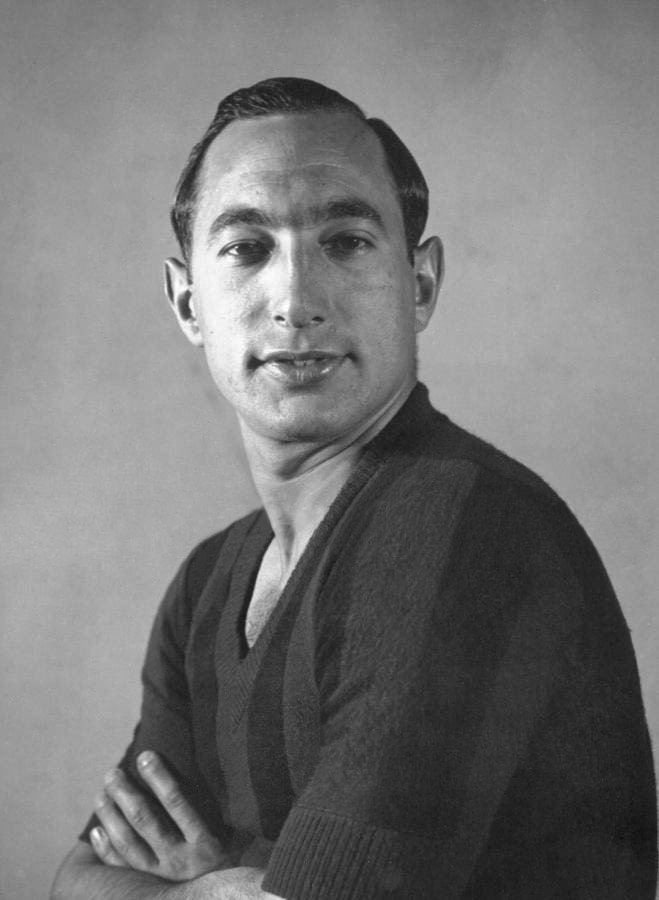
Isidro Lángara holds the best goalscoring ratio, scoring 17 goals in 12 caps.

As of 6 October 2026, the twenty highest scorers for Spain are:

Rank	Player	Career	Goals	Caps	Average
1	David Villa	2005–2017	59	98	0.608
2	Raúl	1996–2006	44	102	0.431
3	Fernando Torres	2003–2014	38	110	0.345
4	**Álvaro Morata**	2014–	37	87	0.425
5	David Silva	2006–2018	35	125	0.280
6	**Mikel Oyarzabal**	2016–	31	64	0.484
7	Fernando Hierro	1989–2002	29	89	0.326
8	Fernando Morientes	1998–2007	27	47	0.574
9	Emilio Butragueño	1984–1992	26	69	0.377
10	**Ferran Torres**	2020–	25	66	0.389
11	Alfredo Di Stéfano	1957–1961	23	31	0.742
11	Sergio Ramos	2005–2021	23	180	0.128
13	Julio Salinas	1986–1996	22	56	0.393
14	Míchel González	1985–1992	21	66	0.318
15	Telmo Zarra	1945–1951	20	20	1.000
16	Isidro Lángara	1932–1936	17	12	1.417
16	Pedro Rodríguez	2010–2017	17	65	0.377
18	Luis Regueiro	1927–1936	16	25	0.640
18	Pirri	1966–1978	16	41	0.390
18	Xabi Alonso	2003–2014	16	113	0.140

- **Bold** denotes players still active at international level for the national team.

===== In a single match =====
- Most goals scored in a match: **6** – Chacho vs Bulgaria, Friendly match, 21 May 1933

===== Oldest and youngest =====
- Youngest goalscorer: **16 years, 57 days** – Lamine Yamal vs Georgia, UEFA Euro 2024 qualifying, 8 September 2023
- Oldest goalscorer: **35 years, 275 days** – Aritz Aduriz vs Macedonia, 2018 FIFA World Cup qualification, 12 November 2016

==== Top goalscorers in World Cup finals ====
Table key
Bold (player)	Denotes players still active at international level
[ ]	Denotes tournaments where the player was part of the squad, but did not play in a match
( )	Denotes tournaments where the player played in one or more matches, but did not score a goal
Bold (year)	Denotes tournaments where the player's team won the World Cup
T	Denotes tournaments where the player was top scorer

Players with at least 5 goals at FIFA World Cup tournaments
Rank	Player	Goals scored	Matches played	Goals per match	Tournaments
1	David Villa	9	12	0.75	2006, **2010**, 2014
2	Emilio Butragueño	5	9	0.56	1986, (1990)
2	Fernando Hierro	5	12	0.42	(1990), 1994, 1998, 2002
2	Fernando Morientes	5	7	0.71	1998, 2002
2	**Mikel Oyarzabal**	5	7	0.71	**2026**

==== Most assists ====
As of 23 March 2025, the highest assist-providers for Spain are:

Rank	Player	Career	Assists	Caps
1	Cesc Fàbregas	2006–2016	33	110
2	David Silva	2006–2018	29	125
3	Andrés Iniesta	2006–2018	27	131
3	Xavi	2000–2014	27	133

- **Bold** denotes players still active at international level for the national team.
- These are Opta defined assists.

==== Most penalty goals ====
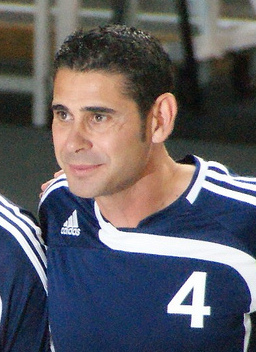
Fernando Hierro scored a record ten international penalties for Spain.

As of 14 july 2026.

Penalties	Player
10	Fernando Hierro
9	Míchel
9	David Villa
8	Sergio Ramos
5	Xabi Alonso
5	Fernando Torres
4	**Mikel Oyarzabal**
4	Dani
3	Emilio Butragueño
3	Agustín Gaínza
3	Pep Guardiola
3	Pirri
3	Raúl

- **Bold** denotes players still active at international level for the national team.

==== Hat-tricks ====
As of 7 September 2024.

Player	Competition	Against	Venue	Result	Date
Mikel Merino	2026 World Cup qualification	Turkey	Away	0–6	7 September 2025
Mikel Oyarzabal	International Friendly	Andorra	Home	5–0	5 June 2024
Álvaro Morata	Euro 2024 qualifying	Georgia	Away	1–7	8 September 2023
Ferran Torres	2020–21 UEFA Nations League A	Germany	Home	6–0	17 November 2020
Isco	International Friendly	Argentina	Home	6–1	27 March 2018
Fernando Torres^{4}	2013 FIFA Confederations Cup	Tahiti	Neutral	10–0	20 June 2013
David Villa	2013 FIFA Confederations Cup	Tahiti	Neutral	10–0	20 June 2013
Pedro	2014 World Cup qualification	Belarus	Away	0–4	12 October 2012
Roberto Soldado	International Friendly	Venezuela	Home	5–0	29 February 2012
Fernando Torres	2009 FIFA Confederations Cup	New Zealand	Neutral	0–5	14 June 2009
David Villa	International Friendly	Azerbaijan	Away	0–6	9 June 2009
David Villa	UEFA Euro 2008	Russia	Neutral	4–1	10 June 2008
Luis García	2006 World Cup qualification	Slovakia	Home	5–1	12 November 2005
Fernando Torres	2006 World Cup qualification	San Marino	Away	0–5	12 October 2005
Fernando Morientes	International Friendly	Ecuador	Home	4–0	30 April 2003
Julen Guerrero	Euro 2000 qualifying	Cyprus	Home	8–0	8 September 1999
Ismael Urzaiz	Euro 2000 qualifying	Cyprus	Home	8–0	8 September 1999
Luis Enrique	Euro 2000 qualifying	San Marino	Home	9–0	5 June 1999
Raúl^{4}	Euro 2000 qualifying	San Marino	Home	9–0	31 March 1999
Raúl^{4}	Euro 2000 qualifying	Austria	Home	9–0	27 March 1999
Julen Guerrero	1998 World Cup qualification	Malta	Away	0–3	18 December 1996
Alfonso	1998 World Cup qualification	Faroe Islands	Away	2–6	4 September 1996
Julio Salinas	1994 World Cup qualification	Albania	Away	1–5	22 September 1993
Emilio Butragueño^{4}	Euro 1992 qualifying	Albania	Home	9–0	19 December 1990
Míchel	1990 FIFA World Cup	South Korea	Neutral	1–3	17 June 1990
José María Bakero	Euro 1988 qualifying	Albania	Home	5–0	18 November 1987
Emilio Butragueño^{4}	1986 FIFA World Cup	Denmark	Neutral	1–5	18 June 1986
Hipólito Rincón^{4}	Euro 1984 qualifying	Malta	Home	12–1	21 December 1983
Santillana^{4}	Euro 1984 qualifying	Malta	Home	12–1	21 December 1983
Chus Pereda	1966 World Cup qualification	Republic of Ireland	Home	4–1	27 October 1965
Vicente Guillot	1964 European Nations' Cup qualifying	Romania	Home	6–0	1 November 1962
Justo Tejada^{4}	International Friendly	Northern Ireland	Home	6–2	15 October 1958
László Kubala	International Friendly	Turkey	Home	3–0	16 November 1957
Alfredo Di Stéfano	International Friendly	Netherlands	Home	5–1	30 January 1957
Telmo Zarra^{4}	International Friendly	Switzerland	Home	6–3	18 February 1951
Estanislau Basora	International Friendly	France	Away	1–5	19 June 1949
Isidro Lángara^{5}	1934 World Cup qualification	Portugal	Home	9–0	11 March 1934
Eduardo González Valiño^{6}	International Friendly	Bulgaria	Home	13–0	21 May 1933
Julio Elícegui	International Friendly	Bulgaria	Home	13–0	21 May 1933
Gaspar Rubio^{4}	International Friendly	France	Home	8–1	14 April 1929
Gaspar Rubio	International Friendly	Portugal	Home	5–0	17 March 1929

- ^{4} Player scored 4 goals
- ^{5} Player scored 5 goals
- ^{6} Player scored 6 goals

===== Oldest and youngest =====
- Youngest player to score a hat trick: **18 years, 344 days** – Juan Errazquin vs Switzerland, Friendly match, 1 June 1925
- Oldest player to score a hat trick: **31 years, 199 days** – David Villa vs Tahiti, 2013 FIFA Confederations Cup, 20 June 2013

==== Discipline ====
Most yellow cards
Sergio Ramos and Sergio Busquets (25 each)

Most red cards
Miguel Àngel Nadal (2)

List of all players sent off
As of 8 September 2024

Player	Date	Against	Location	Result	Type of Game
Ricardo Zamora	2 Sep 1920	Italy	Olympisch Stadion, Antwerp	2–0	1920 Summer Olympics
Jesús Larraza	25 May 1924	Italy	Stade Yves-du-Manoir, Colombes	0–1	1924 Summer Olympics
José María Peña	27 Sep 1925	Austria	Hohe Warte Stadium, Vienne	0–1	Friendly
Severino Reija	8 May 1965	(Scotland) Wales	Hampden Park, Glasgow	0–0	Friendly
Eladio Silvestre	23 Feb 1969	Belgium	Stade Maurice Dufrasne, Liege	2–1	1970 World Cup Qualifier
José Claramunt	25 Sep 1974	Denmark	Københavns Idrætspark, Copenhagen	1–2	Euro 1976 Qualifier
Isidoro San José	4 Apr 1979	Romania	Stadionul Ion Oblemenco, Craiova	2–2	Euro 1980 Qualifier
José Ramón Alexanco	10 Oct 1979	(Socialist Federal Republic of Yugoslavia) Yugoslavia	Estadio Luis Casanova, València	0–1	Euro 1980 Qualifier
Tente Sánchez	24 Mar 1982	Wales	Estadio Luis Casanova, València	1–1	Friendly
Chendo	1 Apr 1987	Austria	Praterstadion, Vienna	2–3	Euro 1988 Qualifier
Manolo Sanchís	22 jan 1989	Malta	National Stadium, Ta'Qali	0–2	1990 World Cup Qualifier
Toni Muñoz	14 Oct 1992	Northern Ireland	Windsor Park, Belfast	0–0	1994 World Cup Qualifier
Juan Manuel López	18 Nov 1992	Republic of Ireland	Ramón Sánchez Pizjuán Stadium, Seville	0–0	1994 World Cup Qualifier
Andoni Zubizarreta	17 Nov 1993	Denmark	Ramón Sánchez Pizjuán Stadium, Seville	1–0	1994 World Cup Qualifier
Miguel Àngel Nadal	17 Jun 1994	Denmark	Cotton Bowl, Dallas	2–2	1994 World Cup
Miguel Àngel Nadal	15 Nov 1995	(North Macedonia) Macedonia	Estadio Martínez Valero, Elx	3–0	Euro 1996 Qualifier
Juan Antonio Pizzi	9 Jun 1996	Bulgaria	Elland Road, Leeds	1–1	Euro 1996
Guillermo Amor	18 Dec 1996	Malta	National Stadium, Ta' Qali	0–3	1998 World Cup Qualifier
Sergi Barjuán	23 Sep 1998	Russia	Nuevo Estadio de Los Cármenes, Granada	1–0	Friendly
Fernando Hierro	15 Nov 2000	Netherlands	Estadio La Cartuja, Seville	1–2	Friendly
Xabi Alonso	8 Sep 2007	Iceland	Laugardalsvöllur, Reykjavík	1–1	Euro 2008 Qualifier
Gerard Piqué	30 Jun 2013	Brazil	Estádio de Maracanã, Rio de Janeiro	0–3	2013 Confederations Cup
Diego Llorente	5 Sep 2019	Romania	Arena Națională, Bucharest	1–2	Euro 2020 Qualifier
Daniel Carvajal	5 Jul 2024	Germany	Neckarstadion, Stuttgart	2–1	Euro 2024
Robin Le Normand	8 Sep 2024	Switzerland	Stade de Genève, Lancy	1–4	2024–25 UEFA Nations League A

=== Manager records ===
Most manager appearances
Vicente del Bosque: 114 matches.
More time as a national team
László Kubala from 5 Oct 1969 to 18 Jun 1980: 3,909 days (68 matches)

== Team records ==
=== Team performance records ===
- World Cup winners: 2010, 2026
- Most consecutive wins including friendlies: 15 (2008–2009)
- Most consecutive matches without losing: 42 (2024–)
- Most consecutive competitive matches without losing: 35 (2023–)
- Longest streak without conceding a goal: 9 matches (1992–1993)

=== Global records ===
- Most consecutive wins achieved by an international coach from debut: 13 – Vicente del Bosque
- Most penalty shoot-outs in one World Cup by one team: 2 at the 2002 FIFA World Cup (shared with Argentina in 1990 and 2022, Costa Rica in 2014, Netherlands in 2014 and 2022, Russia in 2018 and Croatia in 2018 and 2022)
- Highest maximum number of points in World Cup qualification: 30 out of 30 (2010) (shared with Germany for 2018)

=== Biggest wins ===
Best results by Spain
	Date	Opponent	Round	Result	Difference
1	21 May 1933	Bulgaria	Friendly	13–0	+13
2	21 December 1983	Malta	(France) Euro 1984 qualification	12–1	+11
3	20 June 2013	Tahiti	(Brazil) 2013 Confederations Cup	10–0	+10
4	11 March 1934	Portugal	(Italy) 1934 World Cup qualification	9–0	+9
4	19 December 1990	Albania	(Sweden) Euro 1992 qualification	9–0	+9
4	27 March 1999	Austria	(Belgium) (Netherlands) Euro 2000 qualification	9–0	+9
4	5 June 1999	San Marino	(Belgium) (Netherlands) Euro 2000 qualification	9–0	+9
8	8 September 1999	Cyprus	(Belgium) (Netherlands) Euro 2000 qualification	8–0	+8
8	5 September 2016	Liechtenstein	(Russia) 2018 World Cup qualification	8–0	+8
8	5 September 2017	Liechtenstein	(Russia) 2018 World Cup qualification	8–0	+8

=== Heaviest defeats ===
Scores from 4–0 and up

Worst results by Spain
	Date	Opponent	Round	Venue	Result	Difference
1	4 June 1928	Italy	(Netherlands) 1928 Olympics	(Netherlands) A	1–7	–6
1	9 December 1931	England	Friendly	(England) A	1–7	–6
2	13 July 1950	Brazil	(Brazil) 1950 World Cup	(Brazil) A	1–6	−5
3	13 June 1963	Scotland	Friendly	(Spain) H	2–6	–4
3	13 June 2014	Netherlands	(Brazil) 2014 World Cup	(Brazil) A	1–5	–4
3	19 April 1942	Italy	Friendly	(Italy) A	0–4	–4
3	17 November 2010	Portugal	Friendly	(Portugal) A	0–4	–4

=== FIFA Rankings ===
Last update was on 21 December 2023. Source:

Spain's FIFA world rankings
Rank	Year	Matches Played	Won	Lost	Drawn	Best		Worst	
Rank	Year	Matches Played	Won	Lost	Drawn	Rank	Move	Rank	Move
8	2023	10	8	1	1	8	▲2	10	▼0
10	2022	13	7	4	2	6	▲1	10	▼3
7	2021	18	10	2	6	6	▲0	8	▼1
6	2020	8	3	1	4	6	▲1	8	▼0
8	2019	10	8	0	2	6	▲2	9	▼1
9	2018	14	7	2	5	6	▲3	10	▼2
6	2017	10	8	0	2	6	▲3	11	▼1
10	2016	15	9	2	4	3	▲1	11	▼3
3	2015	9	8	0	1	3	▲5	12	▼2
9	2014	12	7	0	5	1	▲1	10	▼7
1	2013	16	12	2	2	1	▲0	1	▼0
1	2012	16	13	3	0	1	▲0	1	▼0
1	2011	12	9	1	2	1	▲1	2	▼1
1	2010	17	13	1	3	1	▲1	2	▼1
1	2009	16	15	0	1	1	▲1	2	▼1
1	2008	16	15	1	0	1	▲3	4	▼0
4	2007	12	10	2	0	4	▲2	12	▼2
12	2006	14	8	2	4	5	▲1	12	▼3
5	2005	12	8	4	0	5	▲2	9	▼2
5	2004	13	7	5	1	3	▲0	5	▼1
3	2003	11	18	2	1	2	▲1	3	▼1
3	2002	13	7	5	1	3	▲4	8	▼1
7	2001	9	7	1	1	6	▲2	8	▼2
7	2000	14	7	3	4	4	▲1	7	▼0
4	1999	10	8	1	1	4	▲6	9	▼2
15	1998	10	5	2	3	9	▲16	25	▼12
11	1997	6	4	2	0	2	▲4	11	▼8
8	1996	11	6	5	0	4	▲2	10	▼3
4	1995	9	5	4	0	2	▲4	6	▼3
2	1994	15	9	4	2	2	▲4	9	▼2
5	1993	9	7	1	1	5	▲7	14	▼1
Best Ranking Worst Ranking Best Mover Worst Mover

=== World Football Elo Ratings history ===
1920	1921	1922	1923	1924	1925	1926	1927	1928	1929	1930	1931	1932	1933	1934	1935	1936	1937	1938	1939	1940	1941	1942	1943	1944	1945	1946	1947	1948	1949	1950	1951	1952	1953	1954	1955
2	1	1	1	2	1	3	3	8	9	6	7	8	7	4	5	4	5	5	5	5	5	6	6	5	5	6	7	8	9	12	10	10	11	11	12
1956	1957	1958	1959	1960	1961	1962	1963	1964	1965	1966	1967	1968	1969	1970	1971	1972	1973	1974	1975	1976	1977	1978	1979	1980	1981	1982	1983	1984	1985	1986	1987	1988	1989	1990	1991
14	11	10	9	9	6	10	13	5	9	10	11	13	15	9	9	5	11	10	8	11	7	7	14	16	15	16	10	12	13	3	4	7	8	7	17
1992	1993	1994	1995	1996	1997	1998	1999	2000	2001	2002	2003	2004	2005	2006	2007	2008	2009	2010	2011	2012	2013	2014	2015	2016	2017	2018	2019	2020	2021	2022	2023	2024	2025	2026	2027
16	9	3	4	3	3	5	3	7	6	3	3	6	6	11	5	1	2	1	1	1	2	8	4	6	3	4	4	4	5	6	3	1	1	1	

Performance summary

- First place: 11 times
- Second place: 4 times
- Third place: 10 times
- Top 3: 35 of 107
- Top 10: 87 of 107
