= France in the UEFA Nations League =

National team in European football league

The UEFA Nations League is a biennial international football competition contested by the senior men's national teams of the member associations of UEFA, the sport's European governing body. The first season began in September 2018, consisting of four groups in each of the four leagues ranked by UEFA coefficient of each country.

France has been on the highest level of the competition, in League A, since the beginning of this tournament. In their first season, they finished second in Group A1, behind the Netherlands but ahead of Germany. In the following edition, France advanced to the Finals for the first time; after winning Group A3, they went on to beat Belgium in the semi-finals and then Spain in the final, making France the first ever European nation to win the World Cup, the European Championship and the Nations League. France reached the Finals for a second time in 2025, losing to Spain in the semi-finals before defeating hosts Germany to finish in third place.

== Overall record ==
UEFA Nations League record
Season**	Division	Group	Pld	W	D*	L	GF	GA	P/R	Rank
(Portugal) 2018–19	A	1	4	2	1	1	4	4	Same position	6th
(France) 2020-21	A	3	8	7	1	0	17	8	Same position	1st
(Netherlands) 2022–23	A	1	6	1	2	3	5	7	Same position	12th
(Germany) 2024–25	A	2	10	6	1	3	20	13	Same position	3rd
2026–27	A	1	In progress							
Total			28	16	5	7	46	32	1 Title	

*Draws include knockout matches decided via penalty shoot-out.
**Group stage and quarter-finals played home and away. Flag shown represents host nation for the finals stage. Red border colour indicates the finals stage was held on home soil.

== List of matches ==
Season	Round	Opponent	Score	Result	Venue	France scorers
(Europe) (Portugal) 2018–19	Group stage					
(Europe) (Portugal) 2018–19	Group stage	Germany	0–0	D	Munich	—
(Europe) (Portugal) 2018–19	Group stage	Netherlands	2–1	W	Saint-Denis	Mbappé, Giroud
(Europe) (Portugal) 2018–19	Group stage	Germany	2–1	W	Saint-Denis	Griezmann (2)
(Europe) (Portugal) 2018–19	Group stage	Netherlands	0–2	L	Rotterdam	—
(Europe) (Italy) 2020–21	Group stage					
(Europe) (Italy) 2020–21	Group stage	Sweden	1–0	W	Solna	Mbappé
(Europe) (Italy) 2020–21	Group stage	Croatia	4–2	W	Saint-Denis	Griezmann, Livaković (o.g.), Upamecano, Giroud
(Europe) (Italy) 2020–21	Group stage	Portugal	0–0	D	Saint-Denis	—
(Europe) (Italy) 2020–21	Group stage	Croatia	2–1	W	Zagreb	Griezmann, Mbappé
(Europe) (Italy) 2020–21	Group stage	Portugal	1–0	W	Lisbon	Kanté
(Europe) (Italy) 2020–21	Group stage	Sweden	4–2	W	Saint-Denis	Giroud (2), Pavard, Coman
(Europe) (Italy) 2020–21	Semi-final	Belgium	3–2	W	Turin	Benzema, Mbappé, T. Hernandez
(Europe) (Italy) 2020–21	Final	Spain	2–1	W	Milan	Benzema, Mbappé
(Europe) (Netherlands) 2022–23	Group stage					
(Europe) (Netherlands) 2022–23	Group stage	Denmark	1–2	L	Saint-Denis	Benzema
(Europe) (Netherlands) 2022–23	Group stage	Croatia	1–1	D	Split	Rabiot
(Europe) (Netherlands) 2022–23	Group stage	Austria	1–1	D	Vienna	Mbappé
(Europe) (Netherlands) 2022–23	Group stage	Croatia	0–1	L	Saint-Denis	—
(Europe) (Netherlands) 2022–23	Group stage	Austria	2–0	W	Saint-Denis	Mbappé, Giroud
(Europe) (Netherlands) 2022–23	Group stage	Denmark	0–2	L	Copenhagen	—
(Europe) (Germany) 2024–25	Group stage					
(Europe) (Germany) 2024–25	Group stage	Italy	1–3	L	Paris	Barcola
(Europe) (Germany) 2024–25	Group stage	Belgium	2–0	W	Décines-Charpieu	Kolo Muani, Dembélé
(Europe) (Germany) 2024–25	Group stage	Israel	4–1	W	Budapest	Camavinga, Nkunku, Guendouzi, Barcola
(Europe) (Germany) 2024–25	Group stage	Belgium	2–1	W	Leuven	Kolo Muani (2)
(Europe) (Germany) 2024–25	Group stage	Israel	0–0	D	Saint-Denis	—
(Europe) (Germany) 2024–25	Group stage	Italy	3–1	W	Milan	Rabiot (2), Vicario (o.g.)
(Europe) (Germany) 2024–25	Quarter-final	Croatia	0–2	L	Split	—
(Europe) (Germany) 2024–25	Quarter-final	Croatia	2–0 (a.e.t.) (5–4 p)	W	Saint-Denis	Olise, Dembélé
(Europe) (Germany) 2024–25	Semi-final	Spain	4–5	L	Stuttgart	Mbappé, Cherki, Vivian (o.g.), Kolo Muani
(Europe) (Germany) 2024–25	Third place play-off	Germany	2–0	W	Stuttgart	Mbappé, Olise
(Europe) 2026–27	Group stage					
(Europe) 2026–27	Group stage	Turkey	1–0	W	İzmit	Mbappé
(Europe) 2026–27	Group stage	Belgium	1–0	W	Brussels	Olise
(Europe) 2026–27	Group stage	Italy	1–1	D	Saint-Denis	Olise
(Europe) 2026–27	Group stage	Belgium	4–1	W	Saint-Denis	Doué, Cherki, Olise (2)
(Europe) 2026–27	Group stage	Italy	12 Nov.		Milan	
(Europe) 2026–27	Group stage	Turkey	15 Nov.		Bordeaux	

== 2018–19 UEFA Nations League ==
=== Group stage ===
Pos	Team	Pld	W	D	L	GF	GA	GD	Pts	Qualification (Note: Due to revamp of the format for the 2020–21 UEFA Nations League, no teams were eventually relegated.)	(Netherlands)	(France)	(Germany)
1	Netherlands	4	2	1	1	8	4	+4	7 (Note: Head-to-head goal difference: Netherlands +1, France −1.)	Qualification for Nations League Finals	—	2–0	3–0
2	France	4	2	1	1	4	4	0	7		2–1	—	2–1
3	Germany	4	0	2	2	3	7	−4	2		2–2	0–0	—

Source: UEFA
Rules for classification: Tiebreakers
Notes:
6 September 2018
20:45

Germany	0–0	France
	Report

Allianz Arena, Munich
Attendance: 67,485
Referee: Daniele Orsato (Italy)

9 September 2018
20:45

France	2–1	Netherlands
Mbappé 14'; Giroud 75'	Report	Babel 67'

Stade de France, Saint-Denis
Attendance: 76,452
Referee: Alberto Undiano Mallenco (Spain)

16 October 2018
20:45

France	2–1	Germany
Griezmann 62', 80' (pen.)	Report	Kroos 14' (pen.)

Stade de France, Saint-Denis
Attendance: 77,300
Referee: Milorad Mažić (Serbia)

16 November 2018
20:45

Netherlands	2–0	France
Wijnaldum 44'; Depay 90+6' (pen.)	Report

De Kuip, Rotterdam
Attendance: 44,366
Referee: Anthony Taylor (England)

== 2020–21 UEFA Nations League ==
=== Group stage ===
Pos	Team	Pld	W	D	L	GF	GA	GD	Pts	Qualification or relegation	(France)	(Portugal)	(Croatia)	(Sweden)
1	France	6	5	1	0	12	5	+7	16	Qualification for Nations League Finals	—	0–0	4–2	4–2
2	Portugal	6	4	1	1	12	4	+8	13		0–1	—	4–1	3–0
3	Croatia	6	1	0	5	9	16	−7	3 (Note: Tied on head-to-head results. Overall goal difference was used as the tiebreaker.)		1–2	2–3	—	2–1
4	Sweden (R)	6	1	0	5	5	13	−8	3	Relegation to League B	0–1	0–2	2–1	—

Source: UEFA
Rules for classification: Tiebreakers
(R) Relegated
Notes:
5 September 2020
20:45

Sweden	0–1	France
	Report	Mbappé 41'

Friends Arena, Solna
Attendance: 0 (Note: Due to the COVID-19 pandemic in Europe, all matches scheduled for September 2020 were played behind closed doors.)
Referee: Szymon Marciniak (Poland)

8 September 2020
20:45

France	4–2	Croatia
Griezmann 43'; Livaković 45+1' (o.g.); Upamecano 65'; Giroud 77' (pen.)	Report	Lovren 17'; Brekalo 55'

Stade de France, Saint-Denis
Attendance: 0
Referee: Ovidiu Hațegan (Romania)

11 October 2020
20:45

France	0–0	Portugal
	Report

Stade de France, Saint-Denis
Attendance: 1,000
Referee: Carlos del Cerro Grande (Spain)

14 October 2020
20:45

Croatia	1–2	France
Vlašić 64'	Report	Griezmann 8'; Mbappé 79'

Stadion Maksimir, Zagreb
Attendance: 6,266
Referee: Björn Kuipers (Netherlands)

14 November 2020
20:45 (19:45 UTC±0)

Portugal	0–1	France
	Report	Kanté 54'

Estádio da Luz, Lisbon
Attendance: 0 (Note: Due to the COVID-19 pandemic in Europe, the match was played behind closed doors.)
Referee: Tobias Stieler (Germany)

17 November 2020
20:45

France	4–2	Sweden
Giroud 16', 59'; Pavard 36'; Coman 90+5'	Report	Claesson 4'; Quaison 88'

Stade de France, Saint-Denis
Attendance: 0
Referee: Aleksei Kulbakov (Belarus)

=== Finals ===
France qualified for its first appearance to the UEFA Nations League Finals in the 2020–21 season, after defeating Portugal on 14 November 2020.

Semi-finals

7 October 2021
20:45

Belgium	2–3	France
Carrasco 37'; Lukaku 40'	Report	Benzema 62'; Mbappé 69' (pen.); T. Hernandez 90'

Juventus Stadium, Turin
Attendance: 12,409
Referee: Daniel Siebert (Germany)

Final

10 October 2021
20:45

Spain	1–2	France
Oyarzabal 64'	Report	Benzema 66'; Mbappé 80'

San Siro, Milan
Attendance: 31,511
Referee: Anthony Taylor (England)

== 2022–23 UEFA Nations League ==
=== Group stage ===
Pos	Team	Pld	W	D	L	GF	GA	GD	Pts	Qualification or relegation	(Croatia)	(Denmark)	(France)	(Austria)
1	Croatia	6	4	1	1	8	6	+2	13	Qualification for Nations League Finals	—	2–1	1–1	0–3
2	Denmark	6	4	0	2	9	5	+4	12		0–1	—	2–0	2–0
3	France	6	1	2	3	5	7	−2	5		0–1	1–2	—	2–0
4	Austria (R)	6	1	1	4	6	10	−4	4	Relegation to League B	1–3	1–2	1–1	—

Source: UEFA
Rules for classification: Tiebreakers
(R) Relegated
3 June 2022
20:45

France	1–2	Denmark
Benzema 51'	Report	Cornelius 68', 88'

Stade de France, Saint-Denis
Attendance: 75,833
Referee: Felix Zwayer (Germany)

6 June 2022
20:45

Croatia	1–1	France
Kramarić 83' (pen.)	Report	Rabiot 52'

Stadion Poljud, Split
Attendance: 30,000
Referee: Marco Guida (Italy)

10 June 2022
20:45

Austria	1–1	France
Weimann 37'	Report	Mbappé 83'

Ernst-Happel-Stadion, Vienna
Attendance: 44,800
Referee: Anastasios Sidiropoulos (Greece)

13 June 2022
20:45

France	0–1	Croatia
	Report	Modrić 5' (pen.)

Stade de France, Saint-Denis
Attendance: 77,410
Referee: Orel Grinfeld (Israel)

22 September 2022
20:45

France	2–0	Austria
Mbappé 56'; Giroud 65'	Report

Stade de France, Saint-Denis
Attendance: 70,188
Referee: Andreas Ekberg (Sweden)

25 September 2022
20:45

Denmark	2–0	France
Dolberg 34'; Skov Olsen 39'	Report

Parken Stadium, Copenhagen
Attendance: 36,064
Referee: István Kovács (Romania)

== 2024–25 UEFA Nations League ==
=== Group stage ===
Pos	Team	Pld	W	D	L	GF	GA	GD	Pts	Qualification or relegation	(France)	(Italy)	(Belgium)	(Israel)
1	France	6	4	1	1	12	6	+6	13 (Note: Tied on head-to-head results. Overall goal difference: France +6, Italy +5.)	Advance to quarter-finals	—	1–3	2–0	0–0
2	Italy	6	4	1	1	13	8	+5	13	Advance to quarter-finals	1–3	—	2–2	4–1
3	Belgium (O)	6	1	1	4	6	9	−3	4 (Note: Tied on head-to-head points. Head-to-head goal difference: Belgium +1, Israel –1.)	Qualification for relegation play-offs	1–2	0–1	—	3–1
4	Israel (R)	6	1	1	4	5	13	−8	4	Relegation to League B	1–4	1–2	1–0	—

Source: UEFA
Rules for classification: Tiebreakers
(O) Play-off winners; (R) Relegated
Notes:
6 September 2024
20:45

France	1–3	Italy
Barcola 1'	Report	Dimarco 30'; Frattesi 51'; Raspadori 74'

Parc des Princes, Paris
Attendance: 44,956
Referee: Sandro Schärer (Switzerland)

9 September 2024
20:45

France	2–0	Belgium
Kolo Muani 29'; Dembélé 57'	Report

Parc Olympique Lyonnais, Décines-Charpieu
Attendance: 42,358
Referee: Tobias Stieler (Germany)

10 October 2024
20:45

Israel	1–4	France
Gandelman 24'	Report	Camavinga 7'; Nkunku 28'; Guendouzi 87'; Barcola 89'

Bozsik Aréna, Budapest (Hungary) (Note: Due to the Gaza war, Israel are required to play their home matches at neutral venues until further notice.)
Attendance: 2,226
Referee: Nikola Dabanović (Montenegro)

14 October 2024
20:45

Belgium	1–2	France
Openda 45+3'	Report	Kolo Muani 35' (pen.), 62'

King Baudouin Stadium, Brussels
Attendance: 39,731
Referee: Irfan Peljto (Bosnia and Herzegovina)

14 November 2024
20:45

France	0–0	Israel
	Report

Stade de France, Saint-Denis
Attendance: 16,611
Referee: Tobias Stieler (Germany)

17 November 2024
20:45

Italy	1–3	France
Cambiaso 35'	Report	Rabiot 2', 65'; Vicario 33' (o.g.)

San Siro, Milan
Attendance: 68,158
Referee: Slavko Vinčić (Slovenia)

=== Quarter-finals ===
First leg

20 March 2025
20:45

Croatia	2–0	France
Budimir 26'; Perišić 45+1'	Report

Stadion Poljud, Split
Attendance: 30,551
Referee: Espen Eskås (Norway)

Second leg

23 March 2025
20:45

France	2–0 (a.e.t.)	Croatia
Olise 52'; Dembélé 80'	Report
Penalties
Mbappé (penalty scored); Tchouaméni (penalty scored); Koundé (penalty missed); Kolo Muani (penalty scored); Hernandez (penalty missed); Doué (penalty scored); Upamecano (penalty scored)	5–4	(penalty missed) Baturina; (penalty scored) Moro; (penalty missed) Ivanović; (penalty scored) Pašalić; (penalty scored) Jakić; (penalty scored) Ćaleta-Car; (penalty missed) Stanišić

Stade de France, Saint-Denis
Attendance: 77,502
Referee: Michael Oliver (England)

2–2 on aggregate; France won 5–4 on penalties.

=== Finals ===
Semi-finals

5 June 2025
21:00

Spain	5–4	France
Williams 22'; Merino 25'; Yamal 54' (pen.), 67'; Pedri 55'	Report	Mbappé 59' (pen.); Cherki 79'; Vivian 84' (o.g.); Kolo Muani 90+3'

MHPArena, Stuttgart
Attendance: 51,724
Referee: Michael Oliver (England)

Third place play-off

8 June 2025
15:00

Germany	0–2	France
	Report	Mbappé 45'; Olise 84'

MHPArena, Stuttgart
Attendance: 51,313
Referee: Ivan Kružliak (Slovakia)

== 2026–27 UEFA Nations League ==
=== Group stage ===
Pos	Team	Pld	W	D	L	GF	GA	GD	Pts	Qualification or relegation	(France)	(Belgium)	(Italy)	(Turkey)
1	France	6	4	1	1	10	6	+4	13	Advance to quarter-finals	—	4–1	1–1	2–1
2	Belgium	6	4	0	2	12	7	+5	12	Advance to quarter-finals	0–1	—	4–1	3–0
3	Italy	6	3	1	2	12	10	+2	10	Will play in 2028–29 UEFA Nations League A	3–1	0–2	—	3–1
4	Turkey	6	0	0	6	4	15	−11	0	Relegation to League B	0–1	1–2	1–4	—

Source: UEFA
Rules for classification: Tiebreakers
25 September 2026
20:45 (21:45 UTC+3)

Turkey	0–1	France
	Report	Mbappé 54'

Kocaeli Stadium, İzmit
Attendance: 28,205
Referee: Felix Zwayer (Germany)

28 September 2026
20:45

Belgium	0–1	France
	Report	Olise 88'

King Baudouin Stadium, Brussels
Attendance: 40,857
Referee: Rade Obrenović (Slovenia)

2 October 2026
20:45

France	1–1	Italy
Olise 55'	Report	Bastoni 68'

Stade de France, Saint-Denis
Attendance: 77,118
Referee: Jesús Gil Manzano (Spain)

5 October 2026
20:45

France	4–1	Belgium
Doué 77'; Cherki 81'; Olise 88', 90+1'	Report	Lukébakio 35'

Stade de France, Saint-Denis
Attendance: 75,389
Referee: Nick Walsh (Scotland)

12 November 2026
20:45

Italy	3–1	France
P. Esposito 26', 75' (pen.); Frattesi 63'	Report	Olise 10'

San Siro, Milan
Attendance: 71,452
Referee: István Kovács (Romania)

15 November 2026
20:45

France	2–1	Turkey
Topçu 49' (o.g.); Kroupi 80'	Report	Bardakcı 90'

Stade Atlantique, Bordeaux
Attendance: 40,033
Referee: Chris Kavanagh (England)

== Goalscorers ==
Player	Goals	2018–19	2020–21	2022–23	2024–25	2026–27
Kylian Mbappé	10	1	4	2	2	1
Michael Olise	6				2	4
Olivier Giroud	5	1	3	1		
Antoine Griezmann	4	2	2			
Randal Kolo Muani	4				4	
Karim Benzema	3		2	1		
Adrien Rabiot	3			1	2	
Bradley Barcola	2				2	
Rayan Cherki	2				1	1
Ousmane Dembélé	2				2	
Eduardo Camavinga	1				1	
Kingsley Coman	1		1			
Désiré Doué	1					1
Mattéo Guendouzi	1				1	
Théo Hernandez	1		1			
N'Golo Kanté	1		1			
Christopher Nkunku	1				1	
Benjamin Pavard	1		1			
Dayot Upamecano	1		1			
Own goals	3		1		2	
Total	53	4	17	5	20	7

Bold players are still active with the national team.

== See also ==
- France at the FIFA Confederations Cup
- France at the FIFA World Cup
- France at the UEFA European Championship
