= France at the FIFA World Cup =

International football delegation

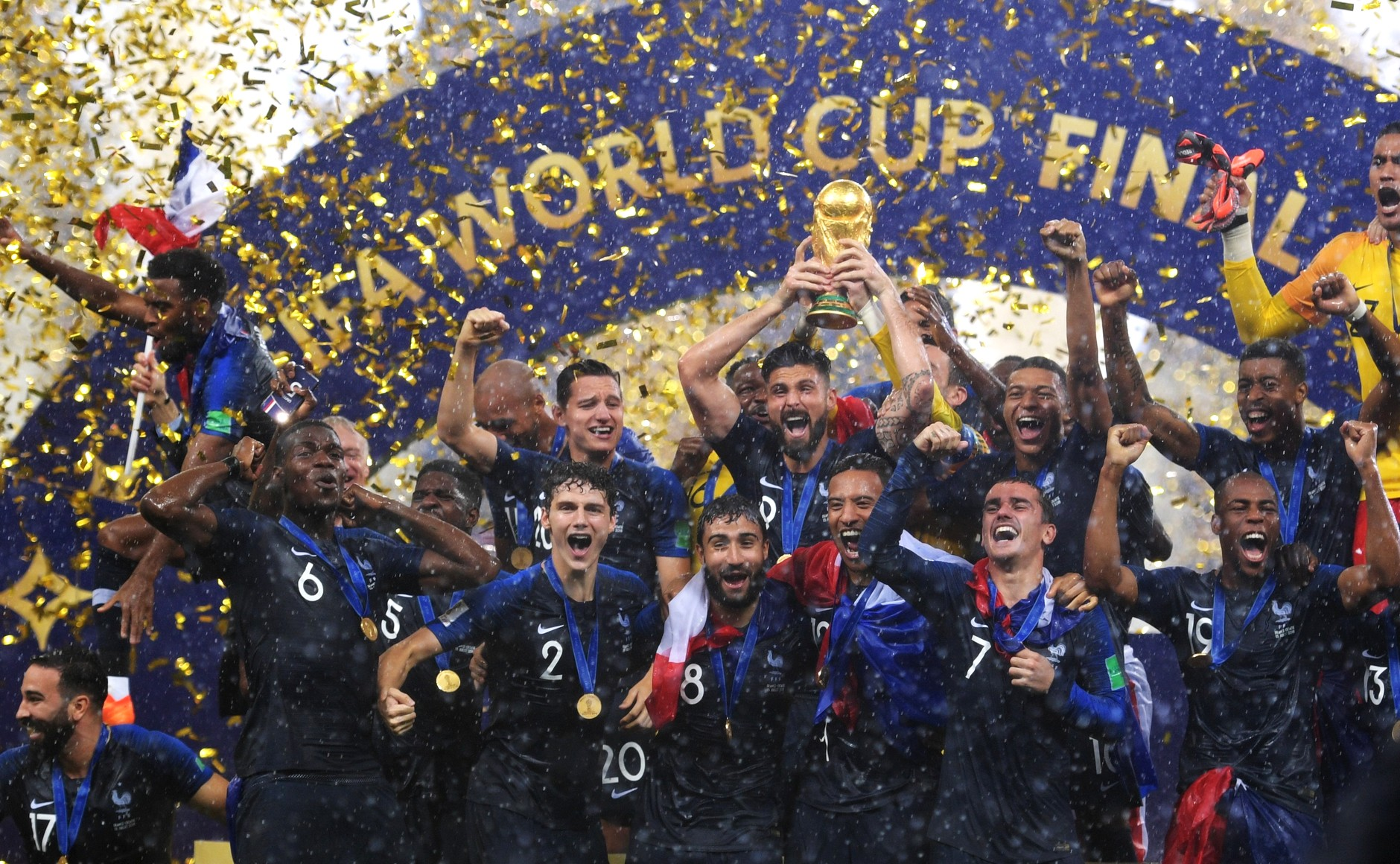
France celebrates their 2018 FIFA World Cup win in Russia after defeating Croatia 4–2 in the final.

This is a record of France's results at the FIFA World Cup. France was one of the four European teams that participated at the inaugural World Cup in 1930 and have appeared in 17 FIFA World Cups, tied for the sixth most of any country. The national team is one of eight to have won the FIFA World Cup title and one of seven to have done so more than once.

The French team won its first World Cup title in 1998. France had defeated Brazil 3–0 in the final match at the Stade de France. The tournament was hosted in France once before in 1938, where France was eliminated by defending champions Italy in the quarter-finals. In 2018, France won the World Cup for the second time, defeating Croatia 4–2 in the final at the Luzhniki Stadium in Russia.

In 2006 and 2022, France finished as runners-up, losing on penalties to Italy (5–3) and Argentina (4–2) after ties after 120 minutes. The team has also finished in third place on two occasions, in 1958 and 1986, and in fourth place twice, in 1982 and 2026.

== FIFA World Cup record ==
Champions Runners-up Third place Fourth place

FIFA World Cup record										Qualification record						
Year	Round	Position	Pld	W	D*	L	GF	GA	Squad	Pld	W	D	L	GF	GA	Campaign
(Uruguay) 1930	Group stage	7th	3	1	0	2	4	3	Squad	Qualified as invitees						
(Italy) 1934	Round of 16	9th	1	0	0	1	2	3	Squad	1	1	0	0	6	1	1934
(France) 1938	Quarter-finals	6th	2	1	0	1	4	4	Squad	Qualified as hosts						1938
(Brazil) 1950	Did not qualify									3	0	2	1	4	5	1950
(Switzerland) 1954	Group stage	11th	2	1	0	1	3	3	Squad	4	4	0	0	20	4	1954
(Sweden) 1958	Third place	3rd	6	4	0	2	23	15	Squad	4	3	1	0	19	4	1958
(Chile) 1962	Did not qualify									5	3	0	2	10	4	1962
(England) 1966	Group stage	13th	3	0	1	2	2	5	Squad	6	5	0	1	9	2	1966
(Mexico) 1970	Did not qualify									4	2	0	2	6	4	1970
(West Germany) 1974	Did not qualify									4	1	1	2	3	5	1974
(Argentina) 1978	Group stage	12th	3	1	0	2	5	5	Squad	4	2	1	1	7	4	1978
(Spain) 1982	Fourth place	4th	7	3	2	2	16	12	Squad	8	5	0	3	20	8	1982
(Mexico) 1986	Third place	3rd	7	4	2	1	12	6	Squad	8	5	1	2	15	4	1986
(Italy) 1990	Did not qualify									8	3	3	2	10	7	1990
(United States) 1994	Did not qualify									10	6	1	3	17	10	1994
(France) 1998	Champions	1st	7	6	1	0	15	2	Squad	Qualified as hosts						1998
(South Korea) (Japan) 2002	Group stage	28th	3	0	1	2	0	3	Squad	Qualified as defending champions						2002
(Germany) 2006	Runners-up	2nd	7	4	3	0	9	3	Squad	10	5	5	0	14	2	2006
(South Africa) 2010	Group stage	29th	3	0	1	2	1	4	Squad	12	7	4	1	20	10	2010
(Brazil) 2014	Quarter-finals	7th	5	3	1	1	10	3	Squad	10	6	2	2	18	8	2014
(Russia) 2018	Champions	1st	7	6	1	0	14	6	Squad	10	7	2	1	18	6	2018
(Qatar) 2022	Runners-up	2nd	7	5	1	1	16	8	Squad	8	5	3	0	18	3	2022
(Canada) (Mexico) (United States) 2026	Fourth place	4th	8	6	0	2	20	10	Squad	6	5	1	0	16	4	2026
(Morocco) (Portugal) (Spain) 2030	To be determined									To be determined						2030
(Saudi Arabia) 2034	To be determined									To be determined						2034
Total	2 Titles	17/23	81	45	14	22	156	95	N/A	125	75	27	23	250	95	Total

*Knockout matches decided via penalty shoot-out are considered a draw.
**Red border indicates tournament was held on home soil.

France's World Cup record
First Match	France 4–1 Mexico (15 July 1930; Montevideo, Uruguay)
Biggest Win	France 7–3 Paraguay (8 June 1958; Norrköping, Sweden)
Biggest Defeat	Brazil 5–2 France (24 June 1958; Solna, Sweden)
Best Result	Champions in 1998 and 2018
Worst Result	Group stage in 1930, 1954, 1966, 1978, 2002 and 2010

== By match ==
Year	Round	Opponent	Score	France scorers
(Uruguay) 1930	Group 1	Mexico	4–1	Laurent, Langiller, Maschinot (2)
(Uruguay) 1930	Group 1	Argentina	0–1	—
(Uruguay) 1930	Group 1	Chile	0–1	—
(Italy) 1934	Round of 16	Austria	2–3 (a.e.t.)	Nicolas, Verriest
(France) 1938	Round of 16	Belgium	3–1	Veinante, Nicolas (2)
(France) 1938	Quarter-final	Italy	1–3	Heisserer
(Switzerland) 1954	Group 1	Yugoslavia	0–1	—
(Switzerland) 1954	Group 1	Mexico	3–2	Vincent, Cardenas, Kopa
(Sweden) 1958	Group 2	Paraguay	7–3	Fontaine (3), Piantoni, Wisnieski, Kopa, Vincent
(Sweden) 1958	Group 2	Yugoslavia	2–3	Fontaine (2)
(Sweden) 1958	Group 2	Scotland	2–1	Kopa, Fontaine
(Sweden) 1958	Quarter-final	Northern Ireland	4–0	Wisnieski, Fontaine (2), Piantoni
(Sweden) 1958	Semi-final	Brazil	2–5	Fontaine, Piantoni
(Sweden) 1958	Match for third place	West Germany	6–3	Fontaine (4), Kopa, Douis
(England) 1966	Group 1	Mexico	1–1	Hausser
(England) 1966	Group 1	Uruguay	1–2	De Bourgoing
(England) 1966	Group 1	England	0–2	—
(Argentina) 1978	Group 1	Italy	1–2	Lacombe
(Argentina) 1978	Group 1	Argentina	1–2	Platini
(Argentina) 1978	Group 1	Hungary	3–1	Lopez, Berdoll, Rocheteau
(Spain) 1982	Group 4	England	1–3	Soler
(Spain) 1982	Group 4	Kuwait	4–1	Genghini, Platini, Six, Bossis
(Spain) 1982	Group 4	Czechoslovakia	1–1	Six
(Spain) 1982	Group D	Austria	1–0	Genghini
(Spain) 1982	Group D	Northern Ireland	4–1	Giresse (2), Rocheteau (2)
(Spain) 1982	Semi-final	West Germany	3–3 (a.e.t.) (4–5 p)	Platini, Tresor, Giresse
(Spain) 1982	Match for third place	Poland	2–3	Girard, Couriol
(Mexico) 1986	Group C	Canada	1–0	Papin
(Mexico) 1986	Group C	Soviet Union	1–1	Fernández
(Mexico) 1986	Group C	Hungary	3–0	Stopyra, Tigana, Rocheteau
(Mexico) 1986	Round of 16	Italy	2–0	Platini, Stopyra
(Mexico) 1986	Quarter-final	Brazil	1–1 (a.e.t.) (4–3 p)	Platini
(Mexico) 1986	Semi-final	West Germany	0–2	—
(Mexico) 1986	Match for third place	Belgium	4–2 (a.e.t.)	Ferreri, Papin, Genghini, Amoros
(France) 1998	Group C	South Africa	3–0	Dugarry, Issa (o.g.), Henry
(France) 1998	Group C	Saudi Arabia	4–0	Henry (2), Trezeguet, Lizarazu
(France) 1998	Group C	Denmark	2–1	Djorkaeff, Petit
(France) 1998	Round of 16	Paraguay	1–0 (g.g.)	Blanc
(France) 1998	Quarter-final	Italy	0–0 (a.e.t.) (4–3 p)	—
(France) 1998	Semi-final	Croatia	2–1	Thuram (2)
(France) 1998	Final	Brazil	3–0	Zidane (2), Petit
(South Korea) (Japan) 2002	Group A	Senegal	0–1	—
(South Korea) (Japan) 2002	Group A	Uruguay	0–0	—
(South Korea) (Japan) 2002	Group A	Denmark	0–2	—
(Germany) 2006	Group G	Switzerland	0–0	—
(Germany) 2006	Group G	South Korea	1–1	Henry
(Germany) 2006	Group G	Togo	2–0	Vieira, Henry
(Germany) 2006	Round of 16	Spain	3–1	Ribéry, Vieira, Zidane
(Germany) 2006	Quarter-final	Brazil	1–0	Henry
(Germany) 2006	Semi-final	Portugal	1–0	Zidane
(Germany) 2006	Final	Italy	1–1 (a.e.t.) (3–5 p)	Zidane
(South Africa) 2010	Group A	Uruguay	0–0	—
(South Africa) 2010	Group A	Mexico	0–2	—
(South Africa) 2010	Group A	South Africa	1–2	Malouda
(Brazil) 2014	Group E	Honduras	3–0	Benzema (2), Valladares (o.g.)
(Brazil) 2014	Group E	Switzerland	5–2	Giroud, Matuidi, Valbuena, Benzema, Sissoko
(Brazil) 2014	Group E	Ecuador	0–0	—
(Brazil) 2014	Round of 16	Nigeria	2–0	Pogba, Yobo (o.g.)
(Brazil) 2014	Quarter-final	Germany	0–1	—
(Russia) 2018	Group C	Australia	2–1	Griezmann, Behich (o.g.)
(Russia) 2018	Group C	Peru	1–0	Mbappé
(Russia) 2018	Group C	Denmark	0–0	—
(Russia) 2018	Round of 16	Argentina	4–3	Griezmann, Pavard, Mbappé (2)
(Russia) 2018	Quarter-final	Uruguay	2–0	Varane, Griezmann
(Russia) 2018	Semi-final	Belgium	1–0	Umtiti
(Russia) 2018	Final	Croatia	4–2	Mandžukić (o.g.), Griezmann, Pogba, Mbappé
(Qatar) 2022	Group D	Australia	4–1	Rabiot, Giroud (2), Mbappé
(Qatar) 2022	Group D	Denmark	2–1	Mbappé (2)
(Qatar) 2022	Group D	Tunisia	0–1	—
(Qatar) 2022	Round of 16	Poland	3–1	Giroud, Mbappé (2)
(Qatar) 2022	Quarter-final	England	2–1	Tchouaméni, Giroud
(Qatar) 2022	Semi-final	Morocco	2–0	T. Hernandez, Kolo Muani
(Qatar) 2022	Final	Argentina	3–3 (a.e.t.) (2–4 p)	Mbappé (3)
(Canada) (Mexico) (United States) 2026	Group I	Senegal	3–1	Mbappé (2), Barcola
(Canada) (Mexico) (United States) 2026	Group I	Iraq	3–0	Mbappé (2), Dembélé
(Canada) (Mexico) (United States) 2026	Group I	Norway	4–1	Dembélé (3), Doué
(Canada) (Mexico) (United States) 2026	Round of 32	Sweden	3–0	Mbappé (2), Barcola
(Canada) (Mexico) (United States) 2026	Round of 16	Paraguay	1–0	Mbappé
(Canada) (Mexico) (United States) 2026	Quarter-final	Morocco	2–0	Mbappé, Dembélé
(Canada) (Mexico) (United States) 2026	Semi-final	Spain	0–2	—
(Canada) (Mexico) (United States) 2026	Match for third place	England	4–6	Mbappé (2), Barcola, Dembélé

== By opponent ==
FIFA World Cup matches (by opponent)
Opponent	Played	Won	Drawn	Lost	GF	GA	GD
Italy	5	1	2	2	5	6	-1
Brazil	4	2	1	1	7	6	+1
Germany	4	1	1	2	9	9	0
Mexico	4	2	1	1	8	6	+2
Denmark	4	2	1	1	4	4	0
Uruguay	4	1	2	1	3	2	+1
Argentina	4	1	1	2	8	9	-1
Belgium	3	3	0	0	8	3	+5
Australia	2	2	0	0	6	2	+4
Austria	2	1	0	1	3	3	0
Croatia	2	2	0	0	6	3	+3
England	4	1	0	3	7	12	-5
Hungary	2	2	0	0	6	1	+5
Northern Ireland	2	2	0	0	8	1	+7
Paraguay	3	3	0	0	9	3	+6
Switzerland	2	1	1	0	5	2	+3
Senegal	2	1	0	1	3	2	+1
South Africa	2	1	0	1	4	2	+2
Spain	2	1	0	1	3	3	0
Poland	2	1	0	1	5	4	+1
Yugoslavia	2	0	0	2	2	4	-2
Canada	1	1	0	0	1	0	+1
Chile	1	0	0	1	0	1	-1
Czechoslovakia	1	0	1	0	1	1	0
Ecuador	1	0	1	0	0	0	0
Honduras	1	1	0	0	3	0	+3
Kuwait	1	1	0	0	4	1	+3
Morocco	2	2	0	0	4	0	+4
Nigeria	1	1	0	0	2	0	+2
Peru	1	1	0	0	1	0	+1
Portugal	1	1	0	0	1	0	+1
Saudi Arabia	1	1	0	0	4	0	+4
Scotland	1	1	0	0	2	1	+1
South Korea	1	0	1	0	1	1	0
Soviet Union	1	0	1	0	1	1	0
Sweden	1	1	0	0	3	0	+3
Togo	1	1	0	0	2	0	+2
Tunisia	1	0	0	1	0	1	-1
Iraq	1	1	0	0	3	0	+3
Norway	1	1	0	0	4	1	+3

== By confederation ==
FIFA World Cup matches (by confederation)
Confederation	Opponents	Total	Wins	Draws	Losses	GF	GA	GD
AFC	Australia; Iraq; Kuwait; Saudi Arabia; South Korea	6	5	1	0	18	4	+14
CAF	Morocco; Nigeria; Senegal; South Africa; Togo; Tunisia	9	6	0	3	15	5	+10
CONCACAF	Canada; Honduras; Mexico	6	4	1	1	12	6	+6
CONMEBOL	Argentina; Brazil; Chile; Ecuador; Paraguay; Peru; Uruguay	18	8	5	5	28	21	+7
OFC	/	0	0	0	0	0	0	0
UEFA	Austria; Belgium; Croatia; Czechoslovakia; Denmark; England; Germany; Hungary; Italy; Northern Ireland; Norway; Poland; Portugal; Scotland; Soviet Union; Spain; Sweden; Switzerland; Yugoslavia	42	22	7	13	83	59	+24

== France at the 1998 FIFA World Cup ==
1998 FIFA World Cup Squad

Head coach: Aimé Jacquet

No.	Pos.	Player	Date of birth (age)	Caps	Club
1	GK	Bernard Lama	7 April 1963 (aged 35)	37	(France) Paris Saint Germain
2	DF	Vincent Candela	24 October 1973 (aged 24)	10	(Italy) Roma
3	DF	Bixente Lizarazu	9 December 1969 (aged 28)	32	(Germany) Bayern Munich
4	MF	Patrick Vieira	23 June 1976 (aged 21)	7	(England) Arsenal
5	DF	Laurent Blanc	19 November 1965 (aged 32)	68	(France) Marseille
6	FW	Youri Djorkaeff	9 March 1968 (aged 30)	37	(Italy) Internazionale
7	MF	Didier Deschamps (c)	15 October 1968 (aged 29)	69	(Italy) Juventus
8	DF	Marcel Desailly	7 September 1968 (aged 29)	41	(Italy) Milan
9	FW	Stéphane Guivarc'h	6 September 1970 (aged 27)	6	(France) Auxerre
10	MF	Zinedine Zidane	23 June 1972 (aged 25)	33	(Italy) Juventus
11	MF	Robert Pires	29 October 1973 (aged 24)	13	(France) Metz
12	FW	Thierry Henry	17 August 1977 (aged 20)	3	(France) Monaco
13	MF	Bernard Diomède	23 January 1974 (aged 24)	6	(France) Auxerre
14	MF	Alain Boghossian	27 October 1970 (aged 27)	6	(Italy) Sampdoria
15	DF	Lilian Thuram	1 January 1972 (aged 26)	32	(Italy) Parma
16	GK	Fabien Barthez	28 June 1971 (aged 26)	12	(France) Monaco
17	MF	Emmanuel Petit	22 September 1970 (aged 27)	17	(England) Arsenal
18	DF	Frank Lebœuf	22 January 1968 (aged 30)	13	(England) Chelsea
19	MF	Christian Karembeu	3 December 1970 (aged 27)	31	(Spain) Real Madrid
20	FW	David Trezeguet	15 October 1977 (aged 20)	4	(France) Monaco
21	FW	Christophe Dugarry	24 March 1972 (aged 26)	23	(France) Marseille
22	GK	Lionel Charbonnier	25 October 1966 (aged 31)	1	(France) Auxerre

=== France vs South Africa (Group C) ===
12 June 1998
21:00

France	3–0	South Africa
Dugarry 36'; Issa 77' (o.g.); Henry 90+2'	Report

Stade Vélodrome, Marseille
Attendance: 55,000
Referee: Márcio Rezende de Freitas (Brazil)

France	South Africa

GK	16	Fabien Barthez
RB	15	Lilian Thuram
CB	8	Marcel Desailly
CB	5	Laurent Blanc
LB	3	Bixente Lizarazu
CM	7	Didier Deschamps (c)	(yellow card) 53'
CM	17	Emmanuel Petit	(yellow card) 28'	(substituted off) 73'
RW	6	Youri Djorkaeff		(substituted off) 84'
AM	10	Zinedine Zidane	(yellow card) 75'
LW	12	Thierry Henry
CF	9	Stéphane Guivarc'h		(substituted off) 26'
Substitutions:
FW	21	Christophe Dugarry		(substituted on) 26'
MF	14	Alain Boghossian		(substituted on) 73'
FW	20	David Trezeguet		(substituted on) 84'
Manager:
Aimé Jacquet

GK	1	Hans Vonk
DF	3	David Nyathi
DF	4	Willem Jackson	(yellow card) 39'
DF	5	Mark Fish
DF	19	Lucas Radebe (c)
DF	21	Pierre Issa
MF	7	Quinton Fortune
MF	10	John Moshoeu
FW	6	Phil Masinga
FW	12	Brendan Augustine		(substituted off) 56'
FW	17	Benni McCarthy		(substituted off) 89'
Substitutions:
MF	11	Helman Mkhalele		(substituted on) 56'
FW	9	Shaun Bartlett		(substituted on) 89'
Manager:
(France) Philippe Troussier

Assistant referees:
Arnaldo Pinto (Brazil)
Merere Gonzales (Trinidad and Tobago)
Fourth official:
Mario Sánchez Yanten (Chile)

=== France vs Saudi Arabia (Group C) ===
18 June 1998
21:00

France	4–0	Saudi Arabia
Henry 37', 78'; Trezeguet 68'; Lizarazu 85'	Report

Stade de France, Saint-Denis
Attendance: 80,000
Referee: Arturo Brizio Carter (Mexico)

France	Saudi Arabia

GK	16	Fabien Barthez
RB	3	Bixente Lizarazu	(yellow card) 50'
CB	5	Laurent Blanc	(yellow card) 36'
CB	8	Marcel Desailly
LB	15	Lilian Thuram
RM	7	Didier Deschamps (c)
CM	10	Zinedine Zidane	(red card) 71'
LM	13	Bernard Diomède		(substituted off) 58'
MF	14	Alain Boghossian
CF	12	Thierry Henry		(substituted off) 79'
CF	21	Christophe Dugarry		(substituted off) 30'
Substitutions:
FW	20	David Trezeguet		(substituted on) 30'
MF	6	Youri Djorkaeff		(substituted on) 58'
MF	11	Robert Pires		(substituted on) 79'
Manager:
Aimé Jacquet

GK	1	Mohamed Al-Deayea
DF	2	Mohammed Al-Jahani	(yellow card) 7'	(substituted off) 76'
DF	3	Mohammed Al-Khilaiwi	(red card) 19'
DF	4	Abdullah Zubromawi
DF	13	Hussein Sulaimani
MF	6	Fuad Anwar (c)
MF	7	Ibrahim Al-Shahrani
MF	16	Khamis Al-Owairan
MF	20	Hamzah Saleh
FW	9	Sami Al-Jaber	(yellow card) 82'
FW	10	Saeed Al-Owairan		(substituted off) 33'
Substitutions:
MF	12	Ibrahim Al-Harbi		(substituted on) 33'	(substituted off) 65'
MF	14	Khalid Al-Muwallid			(substituted on) 65'
DF	17	Ahmed Dokhi		(substituted on) 76'
Manager:
(Brazil) Carlos Alberto Parreira

Assistant referees:
Reynaldo Salinas (Honduras)
Luis Torres Zuniga (Costa Rica)
Fourth official:
Alberto Tejada Noriega (Peru)

=== France vs Denmark (Group C) ===
24 June 1998
16:00

France	2–1	Denmark
Djorkaeff 12' (pen.); Petit 56'	Report	M. Laudrup 42' (pen.)

Stade Gerland, Lyon
Attendance: 39,100
Referee: Pierluigi Collina (Italy)

France	Denmark

GK	16	Fabien Barthez
RB	2	Vincent Candela
CB	8	Marcel Desailly (c)
LB	18	Franck Leboeuf
RM	4	Patrick Vieira	(yellow card) 62'
CM	6	Youri Djorkaeff
CM	11	Robert Pires		(substituted off) 71'
LM	13	Bernard Diomède	(yellow card) 53'
AM	17	Emmanuel Petit		(substituted off) 64'
AM	19	Christian Karembeu
CF	20	David Trezeguet		(substituted off) 85'
Substitutions:
MF	14	Alain Boghossian		(substituted on) 64'
FW	12	Thierry Henry		(substituted on) 71'
FW	9	Stéphane Guivarc'h		(substituted on) 85'
Manager:
Aimé Jacquet

GK	1	Peter Schmeichel
DF	2	Michael Schjønberg
DF	3	Marc Rieper
DF	4	Jes Høgh
DF	5	Jan Heintze
DF	6	Thomas Helveg
DF	13	Jacob Laursen		(substituted off) 46'
MF	7	Allan Nielsen
MF	10	Michael Laudrup (c)
MF	21	Martin Jørgensen		(substituted off) 54'
FW	11	Brian Laudrup		(substituted off) 75'
Substitutions:
DF	12	Søren Colding	(yellow card) 65'	(substituted on) 46'
FW	19	Ebbe Sand		(substituted on) 54'
MF	15	Stig Tøfting	(yellow card) 78'	(substituted on) 75'
Manager:
(Sweden) Bo Johansson

Assistant referees:
Marc Van den Broeck (Belgium)
Emanuel Zammit (Malta)
Fourth official:
Vítor Melo Pereira (Portugal)

=== France vs Paraguay (round of 16) ===
28 June 1998
16:30

France	1–0 (a.e.t.)	Paraguay
Blanc 114'	Report

Stade Félix-Bollaert, Lens
Attendance: 31,800
Referee: Ali Bujsaim (United Arab Emirates)

France	Paraguay

GK	16	Fabien Barthez
RB	15	Lilian Thuram
CB	5	Laurent Blanc
CB	8	Marcel Desailly
LB	3	Bixente Lizarazu
CM	7	Didier Deschamps (c)
CM	17	Emmanuel Petit	(substituted off) 69'
RW	13	Bernard Diomède	(substituted off) 76'
LW	6	Youri Djorkaeff
CF	20	David Trezeguet
CF	12	Thierry Henry	(substituted off) 64'
Substitutes:
MF	11	Robert Pires	(substituted on) 64'
MF	14	Alain Boghossian	(substituted on) 69'
FW	9	Stéphane Guivarc'h	(substituted on) 76'
Manager:
Aimé Jacquet

GK	1	José Luis Chilavert (c)	(yellow card) 19'
RB	2	Francisco Arce	(yellow card) 84'
CB	4	Carlos Gamarra
CB	5	Celso Ayala
LB	11	Pedro Sarabia
CM	10	Roberto Acuña
CM	16	Julio César Enciso	(yellow card) 32'
CM	13	Carlos Humberto Paredes		(substituted off) 75'
AM	21	Jorge Luis Campos		(substituted off) 55'
AM	15	Miguel Ángel Benítez	(yellow card) 23'
CF	9	José Cardozo		(substituted off) 91'
Substitutes:
MF	7	Julio César Yegros		(substituted on) 55'
DF	20	Denis Caniza		(substituted on) 75'
MF	8	Aristides Rojas	(yellow card) 99'	(substituted on) 91'
Manager:
(Brazil) Paulo César Carpegiani

Assistant referees:
Nimal Wickeramatunge (Sri Lanka)
Lencie Fred (Vanuatu)
Fourth official:
Esse Baharmast (United States)

=== Italy vs France (Quarter-final) ===
3 July 1998
16:30

Italy	0–0 (a.e.t.)	France
	Report
Penalties
R. Baggio (penalty scored); Albertini (penalty missed); Costacurta (penalty scored); Vieri (penalty scored); Di Biagio (penalty missed)	3–4	(penalty scored) Zidane; (penalty missed) Lizarazu; (penalty scored) Trezeguet; (penalty scored) Henry; (penalty scored) Blanc

Stade de France, Saint-Denis
Attendance: 77,000
Referee: Hugh Dallas (Scotland)

Italy	France

GK	12	Gianluca Pagliuca
RB	2	Giuseppe Bergomi	(yellow card) 28'
CB	4	Fabio Cannavaro
CB	5	Alessandro Costacurta	(yellow card) 113'
LB	3	Paolo Maldini (c)
CM	11	Dino Baggio		(substituted off) 52'
CM	14	Luigi Di Biagio
RW	17	Francesco Moriero
LW	7	Gianluca Pessotto		(substituted off) 90'
SS	10	Alessandro Del Piero	(yellow card) 26'	(substituted off) 67'
CF	21	Christian Vieri
Substitutes:
MF	9	Demetrio Albertini		(substituted on) 52'
FW	18	Roberto Baggio		(substituted on) 67'
MF	15	Angelo Di Livio		(substituted on) 90'
Manager:
Cesare Maldini

GK	16	Fabien Barthez
RB	15	Lilian Thuram
CB	5	Laurent Blanc
CB	8	Marcel Desailly
LB	3	Bixente Lizarazu
DM	7	Didier Deschamps (c)	(yellow card) 62'
RM	19	Christian Karembeu		(substituted off) 65'
LM	17	Emmanuel Petit
AM	10	Zinedine Zidane
AM	6	Youri Djorkaeff
CF	9	Stéphane Guivarc'h	(yellow card) 53'	(substituted off) 65'
Substitutes:
FW	12	Thierry Henry		(substituted on) 65'
FW	20	David Trezeguet		(substituted on) 65'
Manager:
Aimé Jacquet

Assistant referees:
Mark Warren (England)
Nicolae Grigorescu (Romania)
Fourth official:
Said Belqola (Morocco)

=== France vs Croatia (Semi-final) ===
8 July 1998
21:00

France	2–1	Croatia
Thuram 47', 70'	Report	Šuker 46'

Stade de France, Saint-Denis
Attendance: 76,000
Referee: José María García-Aranda (Spain)

France	Croatia

GK	16	Fabien Barthez
RB	15	Lilian Thuram
CB	5	Laurent Blanc	(red card) 76'
CB	8	Marcel Desailly
LB	3	Bixente Lizarazu
DM	7	Didier Deschamps (c)
RM	19	Christian Karembeu		(substituted off) 31'
LM	17	Emmanuel Petit
AM	10	Zinedine Zidane
AM	6	Youri Djorkaeff		(substituted off) 77'
CF	9	Stéphane Guivarc'h		(substituted off) 68'
Substitutes:
FW	12	Thierry Henry		(substituted on) 31'
FW	20	David Trezeguet		(substituted on) 68'
DF	18	Frank Leboeuf		(substituted on) 77'
Manager:
Aimé Jacquet

GK	1	Dražen Ladić
SW	4	Igor Štimac
CB	20	Dario Šimić	(yellow card) 88'
CB	6	Slaven Bilić
RWB	13	Mario Stanić	(yellow card) 75'	(substituted off) 89'
LWB	17	Robert Jarni
DM	14	Zvonimir Soldo
CM	7	Aljoša Asanović	(yellow card) 45'
CM	10	Zvonimir Boban (c)		(substituted off) 63'
CF	19	Goran Vlaović
CF	9	Davor Šuker
Substitutes:
MF	11	Silvio Marić		(substituted on) 63'
MF	8	Robert Prosinečki		(substituted on) 89'
Manager:
Miroslav Blažević

Assistant referees:
Fernando Tresaco Gracia (Spain)
Jorge Diaz Galvez (Chile)
Fourth official:
Epifanio Gonzalez Chavez (Paraguay)

=== Brazil vs France (Final) ===
The 1998 final was held on 12 July at the Stade de France, Saint-Denis. France defeated holders Brazil 3–0, with two goals from Zinedine Zidane and a stoppage time strike from Emmanuel Petit. The win gave France their first World Cup title, becoming the sixth national team after Uruguay, Italy, England, West Germany and Argentina to win the tournament on their home soil. They also inflicted the heaviest defeat on Brazil since 1930.

The pre-match build up was dominated by the omission of Brazilian striker Ronaldo from the starting lineup only to be reinstated 45 minutes before kick-off. He managed to create the first open chance for Brazil in the 22nd minute, dribbling past defender Thuram before sending a cross out on the left side that goalkeeper Fabien Barthez struggled to hold onto. France however took the lead in the 27th minute after Brazilian defender Roberto Carlos conceded a corner which Zidane scored with a header from the right. Three minutes before half-time, Zidane scored his second goal of the match, similarly another header from a corner, this time from the left side. The tournament hosts went down to ten men in the 68th minute as Marcel Desailly was sent off for a second bookable offence. Brazil reacted to this by making an attacking substitution and although they applied pressure France sealed the win with a third goal: substitute Patrick Vieira set up his club teammate Petit in a counterattack to shoot low past goalkeeper Cláudio Taffarel.

French president Jacques Chirac was in attendance to congratulate and commiserate the winners and runners-up respectively after the match. Several days after the victory, winning manager Aimé Jacquet announced his resignation from the French team with immediate effect.

12 July 1998
21:00

Brazil	0–3	France
	Report	Zidane 27', 45+1'; Petit 90+3'

Stade de France, Saint-Denis
Attendance: 80,000
Referee: Said Belqola (Morocco)

Brazil	France

GK	1	Claudio Taffarel
RB	2	Cafu
CB	3	Aldair
CB	4	Junior Baiano	(yellow card) 33'
LB	6	Roberto Carlos
CM	5	César Sampaio		(substituted off) 73'
CM	8	Dunga (c)
AM	10	Rivaldo
AM	18	Leonardo		(substituted off) 46'
CF	20	Bebeto
CF	9	Ronaldo
Substitutes:
MF	19	Denílson		(substituted on) 46'
FW	21	Edmundo		(substituted on) 73'
Manager:
Mário Zagallo

GK	16	Fabien Barthez
RB	15	Lilian Thuram
CB	18	Frank Leboeuf
CB	8	Marcel Desailly	(yellow card) 48' (yellow-red card) 68'
LB	3	Bixente Lizarazu
DM	7	Didier Deschamps (c)	(yellow card) 39'
CM	19	Christian Karembeu	(yellow card) 56'	(substituted off) 57'
CM	17	Emmanuel Petit
AM	10	Zinedine Zidane
CF	6	Youri Djorkaeff		(substituted off) 74'
CF	9	Stéphane Guivarc'h		(substituted off) 66'
Substitutes:
MF	14	Alain Boghossian		(substituted on) 57'
FW	21	Christophe Dugarry		(substituted on) 66'
MF	4	Patrick Vieira		(substituted on) 74'
Manager:
Aimé Jacquet

Man of the Match:
Zinedine Zidane (France)

Assistant referees:
Mark Warren (England)
Achmat Salie (South Africa)
Fourth official:
Rahman Al Zaid (Saudi Arabia)

Match rules

- 90 minutes
- 30 minutes of extra-time if necessary
- Penalty shoot-out if scores still level.
- Maximum of three substitutions.

== France at the 2018 FIFA World Cup ==
2018 FIFA World Cup Squad

Head coach: Didier Deschamps

No.	Pos.	Player	Date of birth (age)	Caps	Goals	Club
1	GK	Hugo Lloris (captain)	26 December 1986 (aged 31)	98	0	(The Football Association) Tottenham Hotspur
2	DF	Benjamin Pavard	28 March 1996 (aged 22)	6	0	(German Football Association) VfB Stuttgart
3	DF	Presnel Kimpembe	13 August 1995 (aged 22)	2	0	(French Football Federation) Paris Saint-Germain
4	DF	Raphaël Varane	25 April 1993 (aged 25)	42	2	(Royal Spanish Football Federation) Real Madrid
5	DF	Samuel Umtiti	14 November 1993 (aged 24)	19	2	(Royal Spanish Football Federation) Barcelona
6	MF	Paul Pogba	15 March 1993 (aged 25)	54	9	(The Football Association) Manchester United
7	FW	Antoine Griezmann	21 March 1991 (aged 27)	54	20	(Royal Spanish Football Federation) Atlético Madrid
8	FW	Thomas Lemar	12 November 1995 (aged 22)	12	3	(French Football Federation) Monaco
9	FW	Olivier Giroud	30 September 1986 (aged 31)	74	31	(The Football Association) Chelsea
10	FW	Kylian Mbappé	20 December 1998 (aged 19)	15	4	(French Football Federation) Paris Saint-Germain
11	FW	Ousmane Dembélé	15 May 1997 (aged 21)	12	2	(Royal Spanish Football Federation) Barcelona
12	MF	Corentin Tolisso	3 August 1994 (aged 23)	9	0	(German Football Association) Bayern Munich
13	MF	N'Golo Kanté	29 March 1991 (aged 27)	24	1	(The Football Association) Chelsea
14	MF	Blaise Matuidi	9 April 1987 (aged 31)	67	9	(Italian Football Federation) Juventus
15	MF	Steven Nzonzi	15 December 1988 (aged 29)	4	0	(Royal Spanish Football Federation) Sevilla
16	GK	Steve Mandanda	28 March 1985 (aged 33)	27	0	(French Football Federation) Marseille
17	DF	Adil Rami	27 December 1985 (aged 32)	35	1	(French Football Federation) Marseille
18	FW	Nabil Fekir	18 July 1993 (aged 24)	12	2	(French Football Federation) Lyon
19	DF	Djibril Sidibé	29 July 1992 (aged 25)	17	1	(French Football Federation) Monaco
20	FW	Florian Thauvin	26 January 1993 (aged 25)	4	0	(French Football Federation) Marseille
21	DF	Lucas Hernandez	14 February 1996 (aged 22)	5	0	(Royal Spanish Football Federation) Atlético Madrid
22	DF	Benjamin Mendy	17 July 1994 (aged 23)	7	0	(The Football Association) Manchester City
23	GK	Alphonse Areola	27 February 1993 (aged 25)	0	0	(French Football Federation) Paris Saint-Germain

=== France vs Australia (Group C) ===
16 June 2018
13:00 MSK (UTC+3)

France	2–1	Australia
Griezmann 58' (pen.); Behich 81' (o.g.)	Report	Jedinak 62' (pen.)

Kazan Arena, Kazan
Attendance: 41,279
Referee: Andrés Cunha (Uruguay)

France	Australia

GK	1	Hugo Lloris (c)
RB	2	Benjamin Pavard
CB	4	Raphaël Varane
CB	5	Samuel Umtiti
LB	21	Lucas Hernandez
CM	12	Corentin Tolisso	(yellow card) 76'	(substituted off) 78'
CM	13	N'Golo Kanté
CM	6	Paul Pogba
RF	11	Ousmane Dembélé		(substituted off) 70'
CF	10	Kylian Mbappé
LF	7	Antoine Griezmann		(substituted off) 70'
Substitutions:
FW	9	Olivier Giroud		(substituted on) 70'
FW	18	Nabil Fekir		(substituted on) 70'
MF	14	Blaise Matuidi		(substituted on) 78'
Manager:
Didier Deschamps

GK	1	Mathew Ryan
RB	19	Josh Risdon	(yellow card) 57'
CB	5	Mark Milligan
CB	20	Trent Sainsbury
LB	16	Aziz Behich	(yellow card) 87'
CM	15	Mile Jedinak (c)
CM	13	Aaron Mooy
RW	7	Mathew Leckie	(yellow card) 13'
AM	23	Tom Rogic		(substituted off) 72'
LW	10	Robbie Kruse		(substituted off) 84'
CF	11	Andrew Nabbout		(substituted off) 64'
Substitutions:
FW	9	Tomi Juric		(substituted on) 64'
MF	22	Jackson Irvine		(substituted on) 72'
FW	17	Daniel Arzani		(substituted on) 84'
Manager:
(Netherlands) Bert van Marwijk

Man of the Match:
Antoine Griezmann (France)

Assistant referees:
Nicolás Tarán (Uruguay)
Mauricio Espinosa (Uruguay)
Fourth official:
Julio Bascuñán (Chile)
Reserve assistant referee:
Christian Schiemann (Chile)
Video assistant referee:
Mauro Vigliano (Argentina)
Assistant video assistant referees:
Tiago Martins (Portugal)
Hernán Maidana (Argentina)
Jair Marrufo (United States)

=== France vs Peru (Group C) ===
21 June 2018
20:00 YEKT (UTC+5)

France	1–0	Peru
Mbappé 34'	Report

Central Stadium, Yekaterinburg
Attendance: 32,789
Referee: Mohammed Abdulla Hassan Mohamed (United Arab Emirates)

France	Peru

GK	1	Hugo Lloris (c)
RB	2	Benjamin Pavard
CB	4	Raphaël Varane
CB	5	Samuel Umtiti
LB	21	Lucas Hernandez
CM	6	Paul Pogba	(yellow card) 86'	(substituted off) 89'
CM	13	N'Golo Kanté
RW	10	Kylian Mbappé		(substituted off) 75'
AM	7	Antoine Griezmann		(substituted off) 80'
LW	14	Blaise Matuidi	(yellow card) 16'
CF	9	Olivier Giroud
Substitutions:
FW	11	Ousmane Dembélé		(substituted on) 75'
FW	18	Nabil Fekir		(substituted on) 80'
MF	15	Steven Nzonzi		(substituted on) 89'
Manager:
Didier Deschamps

GK	1	Pedro Gallese
RB	17	Luis Advíncula
CB	15	Christian Ramos
CB	2	Alberto Rodríguez		(substituted off) 46'
LB	6	Miguel Trauco
CM	23	Pedro Aquino	(yellow card) 81'
CM	19	Yoshimar Yotún		(substituted off) 46'
RW	18	André Carrillo
AM	8	Christian Cueva		(substituted off) 82'
LW	20	Edison Flores
CF	9	Paolo Guerrero (c)	(yellow card) 23'
Substitutions:
FW	10	Jefferson Farfán		(substituted on) 46'
DF	4	Anderson Santamaría		(substituted on) 46'
FW	11	Raúl Ruidíaz		(substituted on) 82'
Manager:
(Argentina) Ricardo Gareca

Man of the Match:
Kylian Mbappé (France)

Assistant referees:
Mohamed Al Hammadi (United Arab Emirates)
Hasan Al Mahri (United Arab Emirates)
Fourth official:
Janny Sikazwe (Zambia)
Reserve assistant referee:
Jerson Dos Santos (Angola)
Video assistant referee:
Daniele Orsato (Italy)
Assistant video assistant referees:
Abdulrahman Al-Jassim (Qatar)
Taleb Al Maari (Qatar)
Szymon Marciniak (Poland)

=== Denmark vs France (Group C) ===
26 June 2018
17:00 MSK (UTC+3)

Denmark	0–0	France
	Report

Luzhniki Stadium, Moscow
Attendance: 78,011
Referee: Sandro Ricci (Brazil)

Denmark	France

GK	1	Kasper Schmeichel
RB	14	Henrik Dalsgaard
CB	4	Simon Kjær (c)
CB	6	Andreas Christensen
LB	17	Jens Stryger Larsen
CM	8	Thomas Delaney		(substituted off) 90+2'
CM	13	Mathias Jørgensen	(yellow card) 45+3'
CM	10	Christian Eriksen
RF	23	Pione Sisto		(substituted off) 60'
CF	21	Andreas Cornelius		(substituted off) 75'
LF	11	Martin Braithwaite
Substitutions:
FW	15	Viktor Fischer		(substituted on) 60'
FW	12	Kasper Dolberg		(substituted on) 75'
MF	18	Lukas Lerager		(substituted on) 90+2'
Manager:
(Norway) Åge Hareide

GK	16	Steve Mandanda
RB	19	Djibril Sidibé
CB	4	Raphaël Varane (c)
CB	3	Presnel Kimpembe
LB	21	Lucas Hernandez	(substituted off) 50'
CM	13	N'Golo Kanté
CM	15	Steven Nzonzi
RW	11	Ousmane Dembélé	(substituted off) 78'
AM	7	Antoine Griezmann	(substituted off) 68'
LW	8	Thomas Lemar
CF	9	Olivier Giroud
Substitutions:
DF	22	Benjamin Mendy	(substituted on) 50'
FW	18	Nabil Fekir	(substituted on) 68'
FW	10	Kylian Mbappé	(substituted on) 78'
Manager:
Didier Deschamps

Man of the Match:
N'Golo Kanté (France)

Assistant referees:
Emerson de Carvalho (Brazil)
Marcelo Van Gasse (Brazil)
Fourth official:
Gianluca Rocchi (Italy)
Reserve assistant referee:
Mauro Tonolini (Italy)
Video assistant referee:
Mauro Vigliano (Argentina)
Assistant video assistant referees:
Wilton Sampaio (Brazil)
Carlos Astroza (Chile)
Tiago Martins (Portugal)

=== France vs Argentina (round of 16) ===
30 June 2018
17:00 MSK (UTC+3)

France	4–3	Argentina
Griezmann 13' (pen.); Pavard 57'; Mbappé 64', 68'	Report	Di María 41'; Mercado 48'; Agüero 90+3'

Kazan Arena, Kazan
Attendance: 42,873
Referee: Alireza Faghani (Iran)

France	Argentina

GK	1	Hugo Lloris (c)
RB	2	Benjamin Pavard	(yellow card) 73'
CB	4	Raphaël Varane
CB	5	Samuel Umtiti
LB	21	Lucas Hernandez
CM	13	N'Golo Kanté
CM	6	Paul Pogba
RW	10	Kylian Mbappé		(substituted off) 89'
AM	7	Antoine Griezmann		(substituted off) 83'
LW	14	Blaise Matuidi	(yellow card) 72'	(substituted off) 75'
CF	9	Olivier Giroud	(yellow card) 90+3'
Substitutions:
MF	12	Corentin Tolisso		(substituted on) 75'
FW	18	Nabil Fekir		(substituted on) 83'
FW	20	Florian Thauvin		(substituted on) 89'
Manager:
Didier Deschamps

GK	12	Franco Armani
RB	2	Gabriel Mercado
CB	17	Nicolás Otamendi	(yellow card) 90+3'
CB	16	Marcos Rojo	(yellow card) 11'	(substituted off) 46'
LB	3	Nicolás Tagliafico	(yellow card) 19'
CM	15	Enzo Pérez		(substituted off) 66'
CM	14	Javier Mascherano	(yellow card) 43'
CM	7	Éver Banega	(yellow card) 50'
RF	22	Cristian Pavón		(substituted off) 75'
CF	10	Lionel Messi (c)
LF	11	Ángel Di María
Substitutions:
DF	6	Federico Fazio		(substituted on) 46'
FW	19	Sergio Agüero		(substituted on) 66'
MF	13	Maximiliano Meza		(substituted on) 75'
Manager:
Jorge Sampaoli

Man of the Match:
Kylian Mbappé (France)

Assistant referees:
Reza Sokhandan (Iran)
Mohammadreza Mansouri (Iran)
Fourth official:
Julio Bascuñán (Chile)
Reserve assistant referee:
Christian Schiemann (Chile)
Video assistant referee:
Massimiliano Irrati (Italy)
Assistant video assistant referees:
Paweł Gil (Poland)
Carlos Astroza (Chile)
Paolo Valeri (Italy)

=== Uruguay vs France (Quarter-final) ===
6 July 2018
17:00 MSK (UTC+3)

Uruguay	0–2	France
	Report	Varane 40'; Griezmann 61'

Nizhny Novgorod Stadium, Nizhny Novgorod
Attendance: 43,319
Referee: Néstor Pitana (Argentina)

Uruguay	France

GK	1	Fernando Muslera
RB	22	Martín Cáceres
CB	2	José Giménez
CB	3	Diego Godín (c)
LB	17	Diego Laxalt
RM	8	Nahitan Nández		(substituted off) 73'
CM	14	Lucas Torreira
CM	15	Matías Vecino
LM	6	Rodrigo Bentancur	(yellow card) 38'	(substituted off) 59'
CF	9	Luis Suárez
CF	11	Cristhian Stuani		(substituted off) 59'
Substitutions:
FW	18	Maxi Gómez		(substituted on) 59'
MF	7	Cristian Rodríguez	(yellow card) 69'	(substituted on) 59'
FW	20	Jonathan Urretaviscaya		(substituted on) 73'
Manager:
Óscar Tabárez

GK	1	Hugo Lloris (c)
RB	2	Benjamin Pavard
CB	4	Raphaël Varane
CB	5	Samuel Umtiti
LB	21	Lucas Hernandez	(yellow card) 33'
CM	6	Paul Pogba
CM	13	N'Golo Kanté
RW	10	Kylian Mbappé	(yellow card) 69'	(substituted off) 88'
AM	7	Antoine Griezmann		(substituted off) 90+3'
LW	12	Corentin Tolisso		(substituted off) 80'
CF	9	Olivier Giroud
Substitutions:
MF	15	Steven Nzonzi		(substituted on) 80'
FW	11	Ousmane Dembélé		(substituted on) 88'
FW	18	Nabil Fekir		(substituted on) 90+3'
Manager:
Didier Deschamps

Man of the Match:
Antoine Griezmann (France)

Assistant referees:
Hernán Maidana (Argentina)
Juan Pablo Belatti (Argentina)
Fourth official:
Alireza Faghani (Iran)
Reserve assistant referee:
Reza Sokhandan (Iran)
Video assistant referee:
Massimiliano Irrati (Italy)
Assistant video assistant referees:
Mauro Vigliano (Argentina)
Carlos Astroza (Chile)
Paolo Valeri (Italy)

=== France vs Belgium (Semi-final) ===
10 July 2018
21:00 MSK (UTC+3)

France	1–0	Belgium
Umtiti 51'	Report

Krestovsky Stadium, Saint Petersburg
Attendance: 64,286
Referee: Andrés Cunha (Uruguay)

France	Belgium

GK	1	Hugo Lloris (c)
RB	2	Benjamin Pavard
CB	4	Raphaël Varane
CB	5	Samuel Umtiti
LB	21	Lucas Hernandez
CM	6	Paul Pogba
CM	13	N'Golo Kanté	(yellow card) 87'
RW	10	Kylian Mbappé	(yellow card) 90+3'
AM	7	Antoine Griezmann
LW	14	Blaise Matuidi		(substituted off) 86'
CF	9	Olivier Giroud		(substituted off) 85'
Substitutions:
MF	15	Steven Nzonzi		(substituted on) 85'
MF	12	Corentin Tolisso		(substituted on) 86'
Manager:
Didier Deschamps

GK	1	Thibaut Courtois
CB	2	Toby Alderweireld	(yellow card) 71'
CB	4	Vincent Kompany
CB	5	Jan Vertonghen	(yellow card) 90+4'
DM	6	Axel Witsel
CM	19	Mousa Dembélé		(substituted off) 60'
CM	8	Marouane Fellaini		(substituted off) 80'
RM	22	Nacer Chadli		(substituted off) 90+1'
LM	7	Kevin De Bruyne
CF	9	Romelu Lukaku
CF	10	Eden Hazard (c)	(yellow card) 63'
Substitutions:
FW	14	Dries Mertens		(substituted on) 60'
MF	11	Yannick Carrasco		(substituted on) 80'
FW	21	Michy Batshuayi		(substituted on) 90+1'
Manager:
(Spain) Roberto Martínez

Man of the Match:
Samuel Umtiti (France)

Assistant referees:
Nicolás Tarán (Uruguay)
Mauricio Espinosa (Uruguay)
Fourth official:
César Arturo Ramos (Mexico)
Reserve assistant referee:
Marvin Torrentera (Mexico)
Video assistant referee:
Massimiliano Irrati (Italy)
Assistant video assistant referees:
Mauro Vigliano (Argentina)
Roberto Díaz Pérez (Spain)
Paolo Valeri (Italy)

=== France vs Croatia (Final) ===
Croatia kicked off the final at 18:00 local time (15:00 UTC), with the ground temperature reported at 27 °C (81 °F). The match was played through a minor thunderstorm, which produced several visible lightning strikes. An audience of 78,011 spectators at the Luzhniki Stadium watched the match, including ten heads of state, among them Russian president Vladimir Putin, French president Emmanuel Macron, and Croatian president Kolinda Grabar-Kitarović. The starting line-ups for both teams were identical to those fielded in the semi-finals.

Croatia had the majority of possession and chances early in the first half, with the ball staying mostly in France's half. An attack by French midfielder Antoine Griezmann was stopped by a challenge from Marcelo Brozović, which was called as a foul despite claims that Griezmann dived. Griezmann took the ensuing 30-yard (27 m) free kick, which was diverted by the head of Mario Mandžukić into the left corner of his own net to give France the lead in the 18th minute. It was the first own goal to be scored in a World Cup final and the 12th of the tournament, the most of any World Cup.

Ten minutes later, Croatia equalised with a left-footed strike by Ivan Perišić to the right corner of the net, assisted by Domagoj Vida after a free kick by Luka Modrić on the right. In the 34th minute, a penalty was awarded against Croatia after Perišić's handball in the box from a corner on the right was reviewed by the video assistant referee. Griezmann scored the penalty in the 38th minute with a low finish to the left, giving France a 2–1 lead at half-time; the first half's three goals were the most of any World Cup final since 1974. France led at half-time despite having only one shot on goal and with only 34% of possession.

A Croatian counter-attack was stopped early in the second half after several pitch invaders were chased onto the field by security officers; Russian feminist rock band and protest group Pussy Riot claimed responsibility for the interruption. In the 59th minute, France extended their lead to 3–1 with a left-foot strike to the left of the net from the edge of the penalty area by Paul Pogba after his initial shot had been blocked. Six minutes later, Kylian Mbappé scored France's fourth goal, with a low right-foot shot from outside the box to the left of the net; Mbappé became the first teenager to score in a World Cup final since Pelé in 1958. Croatia scored their second goal in the 69th minute from a back-pass that goalkeeper Hugo Lloris failed to dribble away from Mandžukić, who poked the loose ball into the unguarded net with his right leg. Despite a late push by Croatia, the match finished as a 4–2 victory for France and the highest-scoring World Cup final since 1966. This was the highest-scoring 90-minute World Cup final since 1958.

15 July 2018
18:00 MSK (UTC+3)

France	4–2	Croatia
Mandžukić 18' (o.g.); Griezmann 38' (pen.); Pogba 59'; Mbappé 65'	Report	Perišić 28'; Mandžukić 69'

Luzhniki Stadium, Moscow
Attendance: 78,011
Referee: Néstor Pitana (Argentina)

France	Croatia

GK	1	Hugo Lloris (c)
RB	2	Benjamin Pavard
CB	4	Raphaël Varane
CB	5	Samuel Umtiti
LB	21	Lucas Hernandez	(yellow card) 41'
CM	6	Paul Pogba
CM	13	N'Golo Kanté	(yellow card) 27'	(substituted off) 55'
RW	10	Kylian Mbappé
AM	7	Antoine Griezmann
LW	14	Blaise Matuidi		(substituted off) 73'
CF	9	Olivier Giroud		(substituted off) 81'
Substitutions:
MF	15	Steven Nzonzi		(substituted on) 55'
MF	12	Corentin Tolisso		(substituted on) 73'
FW	18	Nabil Fekir		(substituted on) 81'
Manager:
Didier Deschamps

GK	23	Danijel Subašić
RB	2	Šime Vrsaljko	(yellow card) 90+2'
CB	6	Dejan Lovren
CB	21	Domagoj Vida
LB	3	Ivan Strinić		(substituted off) 81'
CM	7	Ivan Rakitić
CM	11	Marcelo Brozović
RW	18	Ante Rebić		(substituted off) 71'
AM	10	Luka Modrić (c)
LW	4	Ivan Perišić
CF	17	Mario Mandžukić
Substitutions:
FW	9	Andrej Kramarić		(substituted on) 71'
FW	20	Marko Pjaca		(substituted on) 81'
Manager:
Zlatko Dalić

Man of the Match:
Antoine Griezmann (France)

Assistant referees:
Hernán Maidana (Argentina)
Juan Pablo Belatti (Argentina)
Fourth official:
Björn Kuipers (Netherlands)
Reserve assistant referee:
Erwin Zeinstra (Netherlands)
Video assistant referee:
Massimiliano Irrati (Italy)
Assistant video assistant referees:
Mauro Vigliano (Argentina)
Carlos Astroza (Chile)
Danny Makkelie (Netherlands)

Match rules

- 90 minutes
- 30 minutes of extra time if necessary
- Penalty shoot-out if scores still level
- Maximum of twelve named substitutes
- Maximum of three substitutions, with a fourth allowed in extra time

== France at the 2022 FIFA World Cup ==
=== Group stage ===
Pos	Team	Pld	W	D	L	GF	GA	GD	Pts	Qualification
1	France	3	2	0	1	6	3	+3	6	Advance to knockout stage
2	Australia	3	2	0	1	3	4	−1	6	Advance to knockout stage
3	Tunisia	3	1	1	1	1	1	0	4	
4	Denmark	3	0	1	2	1	3	−2	1	

Source: FIFA
Rules for classification: Group stage tiebreakers
22 November 2022
22:00

France	4–1	Australia
Rabiot 27'; Giroud 32', 71'; Mbappé 68'		Goodwin 9'

Al Janoub Stadium, Al Wakrah
Attendance: 40,875
Referee: Victor Gomes (South Africa)
26 November 2022
19:00

France	2–1	Denmark
Mbappé 61', 86'		A. Christensen 68'

Stadium 974, Doha
Attendance: 42,860
Referee: Szymon Marciniak (Poland)
30 November 2022
18:00

Tunisia	1–0	France
Khazri 58'

Education City Stadium, Al Rayyan
Attendance: 43,627
Referee: Matthew Conger (New Zealand)

=== Round of 16 ===
4 December 2022
18:00

France	3–1	Poland
Giroud 44'; Mbappé 74', 90+1'		Lewandowski 90+9' (pen.)

Al Thumama Stadium, Doha
Attendance: 40,989
Referee: Jesús Valenzuela (Venezuela)

=== Quarter-finals ===
10 December 2022
22:00

England	1–2	France
Kane 54' (pen.)		Tchouaméni 17'; Giroud 78'

Al Bayt Stadium, Al Khor
Attendance: 68,895
Referee: Wilton Sampaio (Brazil)

=== Semi-finals ===
14 December 2022
22:00

France	2–0	Morocco
T. Hernandez 5'; Kolo Muani 79'

Al Bayt Stadium, Al Khor
Attendance: 68,294
Referee: César Arturo Ramos (Mexico)

=== Final ===
18 December 2022
18:00

Argentina	3–3 (a.e.t.)	France
Messi 23' (pen.), 108'; Di María 36'		Mbappé 80' (pen.), 81', 118' (pen.)
Penalties
Messi (penalty scored); Dybala (penalty scored); Paredes (penalty scored); Montiel (penalty scored)	4–2	(penalty scored) Mbappé; (penalty missed) Coman; (penalty missed) Tchouaméni; (penalty scored) Kolo Muani

Lusail Stadium, Lusail
Attendance: 88,966
Referee: Szymon Marciniak (Poland)

Argentina	France

GK	23	Emiliano Martínez	(yellow card) PSO
RB	26	Nahuel Molina		(substituted off) 91'
CB	13	Cristian Romero
CB	19	Nicolás Otamendi
LB	3	Nicolás Tagliafico		(substituted off) 120+1'
DM	24	Enzo Fernández	(yellow card) 45+7'
CM	20	Alexis Mac Allister		(substituted off) 116'
CM	7	Rodrigo De Paul		(substituted off) 102'
RF	10	Lionel Messi (c)
CF	9	Julián Alvarez		(substituted off) 102'
LF	11	Ángel Di María		(substituted off) 64'
Substitutions:
MF	8	Marcos Acuña	(yellow card) 90+8'	(substituted on) 64'
DF	4	Gonzalo Montiel	(yellow card) 116'	(substituted on) 91'
MF	5	Leandro Paredes	(yellow card) 114'	(substituted on) 102'
FW	22	Lautaro Martínez		(substituted on) 102'
DF	6	Germán Pezzella		(substituted on) 116'
FW	21	Paulo Dybala		(substituted on) 120+1'
Manager:
Lionel Scaloni

GK	1	Hugo Lloris (c)
RB	5	Jules Koundé		(substituted off) 120+1'
CB	4	Raphaël Varane		(substituted off) 113'
CB	18	Dayot Upamecano
LB	22	Théo Hernandez		(substituted off) 71'
CM	8	Aurélien Tchouaméni
CM	14	Adrien Rabiot	(yellow card) 55'	(substituted off) 96' (Note: Rabiot suffered a knock to the head in the 94th minute. Therefore, his substitution for Fofana fell under FIFA's "concussion protocol", which allows a player at risk of a concussion to be substituted without taking account either the substitution window nor the amount of players already substituted.)
RW	11	Ousmane Dembélé		(substituted off) 41'
AM	7	Antoine Griezmann		(substituted off) 71'
LW	10	Kylian Mbappé
CF	9	Olivier Giroud	(yellow card) 90+5'	(substituted off) 41'
Substitutions:
FW	12	Randal Kolo Muani		(substituted on) 41'
FW	26	Marcus Thuram	(yellow card) 87'	(substituted on) 41'
FW	20	Kingsley Coman		(substituted on) 71'
MF	25	Eduardo Camavinga		(substituted on) 71'
MF	13	Youssouf Fofana		(substituted on) 96'
DF	24	Ibrahima Konaté		(substituted on) 113'
DF	3	Axel Disasi		(substituted on) 120+1'
Manager:
Didier Deschamps

Man of the Match:
Lionel Messi (Argentina)

Assistant referees:
Paweł Sokolnicki (Poland)
Tomasz Listkiewicz (Poland)
Fourth official:
Ismail Elfath (United States)
Reserve assistant referee:
Kathryn Nesbitt (United States)
Video assistant referee:
Tomasz Kwiatkowski (Poland)
Assistant video assistant referees:
Juan Soto (Venezuela)
Kyle Atkins (United States)
Fernando Guerrero (Mexico)
Stand-by video assistant referee:
Bastian Dankert (Germany)
Stand-by assistant video assistant referee:
Corey Parker (United States)

== France at the 2026 FIFA World Cup ==
=== Group stage ===
Pos	Team	Pld	W	D	L	GF	GA	GD	Pts	Qualification
1	France	3	3	0	0	10	2	+8	9	Advance to knockout stage
2	Norway	3	2	0	1	8	7	+1	6	Advance to knockout stage
3	Senegal	3	1	0	2	8	6	+2	3	Advance to knockout stage
4	Iraq	3	0	0	3	1	12	−11	0	

Source: FIFA
Rules for classification: Group stage tiebreakers
June 16, 2026
3:00 p.m. UTC−4

France	3–1	Senegal
Mbappé 66', 90+6'; Barcola 82'	(Note: "France vs Senegal | First Stage | FIFA World Cup 2026". FIFA. Retrieved June 16, 2026.; "Match Report – Group I – France v. Senegal". FIFA. Retrieved June 16, 2026.; "Post match summary report – Group I – France v. Senegal". FIFA. June 16, 2026. Retrieved June 17, 2026.)	Mbaye 90+5'

MetLife Stadium, East Rutherford
Attendance: 80,545
Referee: Alireza Faghani (Australia)

June 22, 2026
5:00 p.m. UTC−4

France	3–0	Iraq
Mbappé 14', 54'; Dembélé 66'	(Note: "France vs Iraq | First Stage | FIFA World Cup 2026". FIFA. Retrieved June 23, 2026.; "Match Report – Group I – France v. Iraq". FIFA. June 23, 2026. Retrieved June 23, 2026.; "Post match summary report – Group I – France v. Iraq". FIFA. June 23, 2026. Retrieved June 23, 2026.)

Lincoln Financial Field, Philadelphia
Attendance: 68,324
Referee: Drew Fischer (Canada)

June 26, 2026
3:00 p.m. UTC−4

Norway	1–4	France
Aasgaard 21'	(Note: "Norway vs France | First Stage | FIFA World Cup 2026". FIFA. Retrieved June 26, 2026.; "Match Report – Group I – Norway v. France". FIFA. June 26, 2026. Retrieved June 26, 2026.; "Post match summary report – Group I – Norway v. France". FIFA. June 26, 2026. Retrieved June 27, 2026.)	Dembélé 7', 20', 32'; Doué 90+4'

Gillette Stadium, Foxborough
Attendance: 64,146
Referee: Michael Oliver (England)

=== Knockout stage ===
Round of 32

June 30, 2026
5:00 p.m. UTC−4

France	3–0	Sweden
Mbappé 45', 74'; Barcola 53'	(Note: "France vs Sweden | Round of 32 | FIFA World Cup 2026". FIFA. Retrieved June 30, 2026.; "Match Report – Round of 32 – France v. Sweden". FIFA. June 30, 2026. Retrieved June 30, 2026.; "Post match summary report – Round of 32 – France vs. Sweden". FIFA. July 1, 2026. Retrieved July 1, 2026.)

MetLife Stadium, East Rutherford
Attendance: 80,663
Referee: Danny Makkelie (Netherlands)

Round of 16

July 4, 2026
5:00 p.m. UTC−4

Paraguay	0–1	France
	(Note: "Paraguay vs France | Round of 16 | FIFA World Cup 2026". FIFA. Retrieved July 4, 2026.; "Match Report – Round of 16 – Paraguay v. France". FIFA. July 4, 2026. Retrieved July 4, 2026.; "Post match summary report – Round of 16 – Paraguay v. France". FIFA. July 4, 2026. Retrieved July 5, 2026.)	Mbappé 70' (pen.)

Lincoln Financial Field, Philadelphia
Attendance: 68,324
Referee: Ilgiz Tantashev (Uzbekistan)

Quarter-finals

July 9, 2026
4:00 p.m. UTC−4

France	2–0	Morocco
Mbappé 60'; Dembélé 66'	(Note: "France vs Morocco | Quarter-final | FIFA World Cup 2026". FIFA. Retrieved July 9, 2026.; "Match Report – Quarter-final – France v. Morocco". FIFA. July 9, 2026. Retrieved July 9, 2026.; "Post match summary report – Quarter-final – France v. Morocco". FIFA. July 9, 2026. Retrieved July 10, 2026.)

Gillette Stadium, Foxborough
Attendance: 63,811
Referee: Facundo Tello (Argentina)

Semi-finals

July 14, 2026
2:00 p.m. UTC−5

France	0–2	Spain
	(Note: "France vs Spain | Semi-final | FIFA World Cup 2026". FIFA. Retrieved July 14, 2026.; "Match Report – Semi-final – France v. Spain". FIFA. July 14, 2026. Retrieved July 14, 2026.; "Post match summary report – Semi-final – France v. Spain". FIFA. July 15, 2026. Retrieved July 15, 2026.)	Oyarzabal 22' (pen.); Porro 58'

AT&T Stadium, Arlington
Attendance: 70,176
Referee: Iván Barton (El Salvador)

Third place

July 18, 2026
5:00 p.m. UTC−4

France	4–6	England
Mbappé 48', 66'; Barcola 54'; Dembélé 90+6'	(Note: "France vs England | Bronze final | FIFA World Cup 2026". FIFA. Retrieved July 15, 2026.; "Match Report – Bronze final – France v. England". FIFA. July 18, 2026. Retrieved July 18, 2026.; "Post match summary report – Bronze final – France v. England". FIFA. July 18, 2026. Retrieved July 19, 2026.)	Rice 3'; Konsa 18'; Saka 37', 45+1', 87' (pen.); Bellingham 90+8'

Hard Rock Stadium, Miami Gardens
Attendance: 64,478
Referee: Jesús Valenzuela (Venezuela)

== Player records ==
=== Most appearances ===
French goalkeeper Fabien Barthez shares the FIFA World Cup record for most clean sheets, with ten in total. The only other player to have reached that number is England's Peter Shilton.

Rank	Player	Matches	World Cups
1	Kylian Mbappé	22	2018, 2022 and 2026
2	Hugo Lloris	20	2010, 2014, 2018 and 2022
3	Antoine Griezmann	19	2014, 2018 and 2022
3	Ousmane Dembélé	19	2018, 2022 and 2026
5	Olivier Giroud	18	2014, 2018 and 2022
5	Raphaël Varane	18	2014, 2018 and 2022
7	Fabien Barthez	17	1998, 2002 and 2006
7	Thierry Henry	17	1998, 2002, 2006 and 2010
9	Lilian Thuram	16	1998, 2002 and 2006
10	Maxime Bossis	15	1978, 1982 and 1986

=== Top goalscorers ===
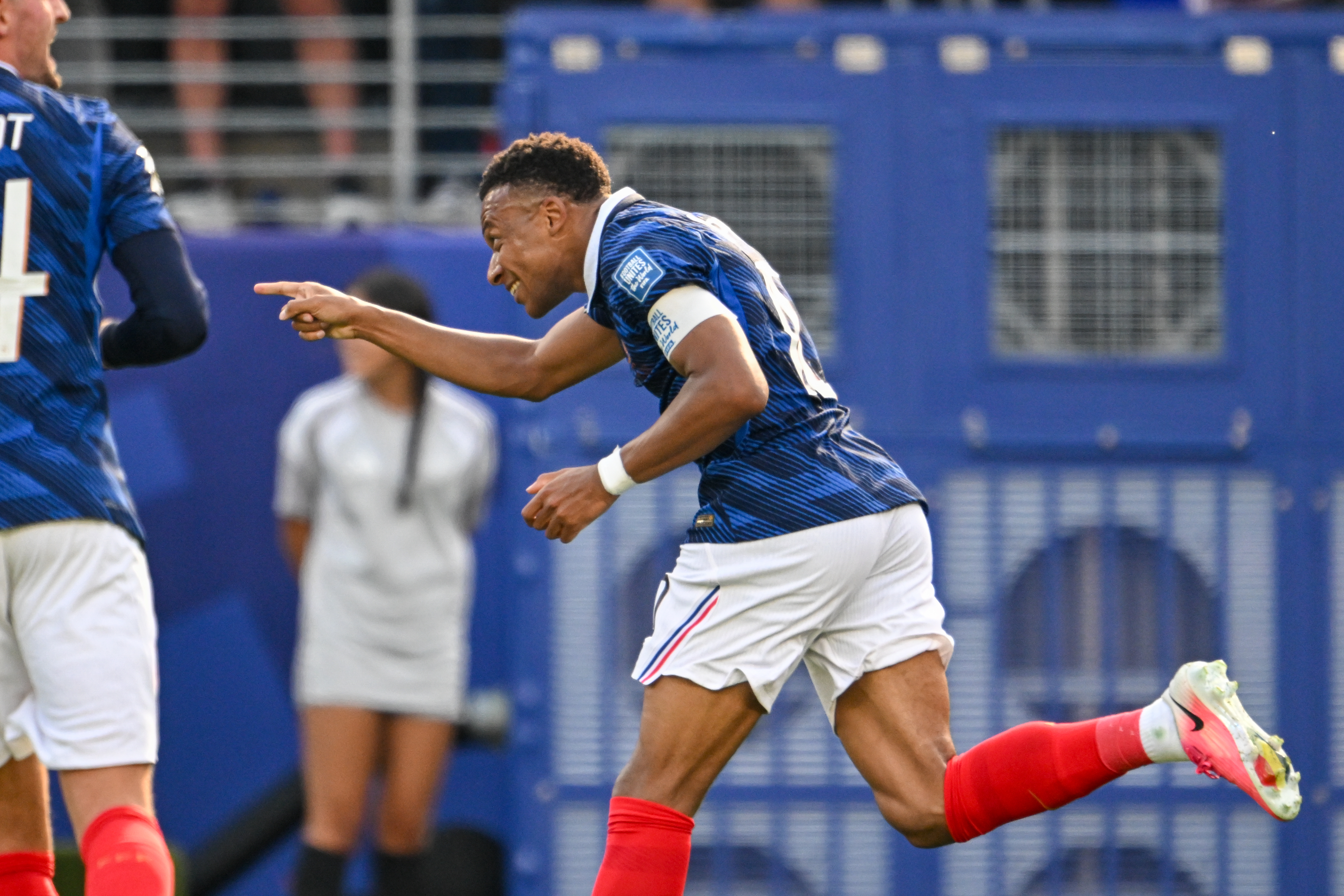
France's top World Cup scorer Kylian Mbappé celebrating a goal against Sweden in the 2026 World Cup round of 32

On 13 July 1930, Lucien Laurent made history by scoring France's first-ever FIFA World Cup goal, coming in their opening match against Mexico in Montevideo.

Just Fontaine scored all of his 13 World Cup goals in 1958, where France finished in third place. This makes him the record holder for most goals scored in a single FIFA World Cup. It also formerly made him the competition's all-time top scorer, until the record was broken by West Germany's Gerd Müller in the 1974 World Cup final.

Rank	Player	Goals	World Cups
1	Kylian Mbappé	22	2018 (4), 2022 (8) and 2026 (10)
2	Just Fontaine	13	1958
3	Thierry Henry	6	1998 (3) and 2006 (3)
3	Ousmane Dembélé	6	2026
5	Michel Platini	5	1978 (1), 1982 (2) and 1986 (2)
5	Zinedine Zidane	5	1998 (2) and 2006 (3)
5	Olivier Giroud	5	2014 (1) and 2022 (4)
8	Raymond Kopa	4	1958
8	Dominique Rocheteau	4	1978 (1), 1982 (2) and 1986 (1)
8	Antoine Griezmann	4	2018

== See also ==
- France at the FIFA Confederations Cup
- France at the UEFA European Championship
- France in the UEFA Nations League
