= France at the UEFA European Championship =

International football delegation

The UEFA European Championship is the main football competition of the men's national football teams governed by UEFA (the Union of European Football Associations). Held every four years since 1960, in the even-numbered year between World Cup tournaments, it was originally called the UEFA European Nations' Cup, changing to the current name in 1968. Starting with the 1996 tournament, specific championships are often referred to in the form "Euro 2008" or whichever year is appropriate. Prior to entering the tournament all teams other than the host nations (which qualify automatically) compete in a qualifying process.

France is one of the most successful nations at the European Championship, having won two titles in 1984 and 2000, and finishing as runners-up in 2016. The team is just below Spain and Germany, who have won four and three titles, respectively, tied with Italy. France hosted the inaugural competition in 1960 and have appeared in eleven tournaments, tied for fourth-best. The team won their first title on home soil in 1984 and were led by Ballon d'Or winner Michel Platini. In 2000, the team, led by FIFA World Player of the Year Zinedine Zidane, won its second title in Belgium and the Netherlands. The team's worst result in the competition was a first-round elimination in 2008 alongside a round of 16 exit in 2020 (they also went out in the first round in 1992 but during that time only eight teams qualified for the tournament finals)

== Overall record ==
UEFA European Championship record										Qualification record						
Year	Round	Position	Pld	W	D*	L	GF	GA	Squad	Pld	W	D*	L	GF	GA	Campaign
(France) 1960	Fourth place	4th	2	0	0	2	4	7	Squad	4	3	1	0	17	6	1960
(Spain) 1964	Did not qualify									6	2	1	3	11	10	1964
(Italy) 1968	Did not qualify									8	4	2	2	16	12	1968
(Belgium) 1972	Did not qualify									6	3	1	2	10	8	1972
(Socialist Federal Republic of Yugoslavia) 1976	Did not qualify									6	1	3	2	7	6	1976
(Italy) 1980	Did not qualify									6	4	1	1	13	7	1980
(France) 1984	Champions	1st	5	5	0	0	14	4	Squad	Qualified as hosts						1984
(West Germany) 1988	Did not qualify									8	1	4	3	4	7	1988
(Sweden) 1992	Group stage	6th	3	0	2	1	2	3	Squad	8	8	0	0	20	6	1992
(England) 1996	Semi-finals	4th	5	2	3	0	5	2	Squad	10	5	5	0	22	2	1996
(Belgium) (Netherlands) 2000	Champions	1st	6	5	0	1	13	7	Squad	10	6	3	1	17	10	2000
(Portugal) 2004	Quarter-finals	6th	4	2	1	1	7	5	Squad	8	8	0	0	29	2	2004
(Austria) (Switzerland) 2008	Group stage	15th	3	0	1	2	1	6	Squad	12	8	2	2	25	5	2008
(Poland) (Ukraine) 2012	Quarter-finals	8th	4	1	1	2	3	5	Squad	10	6	3	1	15	4	2012
(France) 2016	Runners-up	2nd	7	5	1	1	13	5	Squad	Qualified as hosts						2016
(Europe) 2020	Round of 16	11th	4	1	3	0	7	6	Squad	10	8	1	1	25	6	2020
(Germany) 2024	Semi-finals	4th	6	2	3	1	4	3	Squad	8	7	1	0	29	3	2024
(United Kingdom) (Republic of Ireland) 2028	To be determined									To be determined						2028
(Italy) (Turkey) 2032	To be determined									To be determined						2032
Total	2 Titles	11/17	49	23	15	11	73	53	—	120	74	28	18	260	94	—

*Denotes draws including knockout matches decided via penalty shoot-out.
**Gold background colour indicates that the tournament was won.
***Red border colour indicates that the tournament was held on home soil.

=== Winning campaigns ===
Year	Manager	Captain	Final goalscorer(s)
1984	Michel Hidalgo	Michel Platini	Michel Platini, Bruno Bellone
2000	Roger Lemerre	Didier Deschamps	Sylvain Wiltord, David Trezeguet

== List of matches ==
Year	Round	Opponent	Score	Result	Venue	France scorer(s)
(France) 1960	Semi-finals	Yugoslavia	4–5	L	Paris	Vincent, Heutte (2), Wisnieski
(France) 1960	Third place match	Czechoslovakia	0–2	L	Marseille	—
(France) 1984	Group stage	Denmark	1–0	W	Paris	Platini
(France) 1984	Group stage	Belgium	5–0	W	Nantes	Platini (3), Giresse, Fernández
(France) 1984	Group stage	Yugoslavia	3–2	W	Saint-Étienne	Platini (3)
(France) 1984	Semi-finals	Portugal	3–2 (a.e.t.)	W	Marseille	Domergue (2), Platini
(France) 1984	Final	Spain	2–0	W	Paris	Platini, Bellone
(Sweden) 1992	Group stage	Sweden	1–1	D	Solna	Papin
(Sweden) 1992	Group stage	England	0–0	D	Malmö	—
(Sweden) 1992	Group stage	Denmark	1–2	L	Malmö	Papin
(England) 1996	Group stage	Romania	1–0	W	Newcastle	Dugarry
(England) 1996	Group stage	Spain	1–1	D	Leeds	Djorkaeff
(England) 1996	Group stage	Bulgaria	3–1	W	Newcastle	Blanc, Penev (o.g.), Loko
(England) 1996	Quarter-finals	Netherlands	0–0 (a.e.t.) (5–4 p)	D	Liverpool	—
(England) 1996	Semi-finals	Czech Republic	0–0 (a.e.t.) (5–6 p)	D	Manchester	—
(Belgium) (Netherlands) 2000	Group stage	Denmark	3–0	W	Bruges	Blanc, Henry, Wiltord
(Belgium) (Netherlands) 2000	Group stage	Czech Republic	2–1	W	Bruges	Henry, Djorkaeff
(Belgium) (Netherlands) 2000	Group stage	Netherlands	2–3	L	Amsterdam	Dugarry, Trezeguet
(Belgium) (Netherlands) 2000	Quarter-finals	Spain	2–1	W	Bruges	Zidane, Djorkaeff
(Belgium) (Netherlands) 2000	Semi-finals	Portugal	2–1 (a.s.d.e.t.)	W	Brussels	Henry, Zidane
(Belgium) (Netherlands) 2000	Final	Italy	2–1 (a.s.d.e.t.)	W	Rotterdam	Wiltord, Trezeguet
(Portugal) 2004	Group stage	England	2–1	W	Lisbon	Zidane (2)
(Portugal) 2004	Group stage	Croatia	2–2	D	Leiria	Tudor (o.g.), Trezeguet
(Portugal) 2004	Group stage	Switzerland	3–1	W	Coimbra	Zidane, Henry (2)
(Portugal) 2004	Quarter-finals	Greece	0–1	L	Lisbon	—
(Austria) (Switzerland) 2008	Group stage	Romania	0–0	D	Zürich	—
(Austria) (Switzerland) 2008	Group stage	Netherlands	1–4	L	Bern	Henry
(Austria) (Switzerland) 2008	Group stage	Italy	0–2	L	Zürich	—
(Poland) (Ukraine) 2012	Group stage	England	1–1	D	Donetsk	Nasri
(Poland) (Ukraine) 2012	Group stage	Ukraine	2–0	W	Donetsk	Ménez, Cabaye
(Poland) (Ukraine) 2012	Group stage	Sweden	0–2	L	Kyiv	—
(Poland) (Ukraine) 2012	Quarter-finals	Spain	0–2	L	Donetsk	—
(France) 2016	Group stage	Romania	2–1	W	Saint-Denis	Giroud, Payet
(France) 2016	Group stage	Albania	2–0	W	Marseille	Griezmann, Payet
(France) 2016	Group stage	Switzerland	0–0	D	Lille	—
(France) 2016	Round of 16	Republic of Ireland	2–1	W	Lyon	Griezmann (2)
(France) 2016	Quarter-finals	Iceland	5–2	W	Saint-Denis	Giroud (2), Pogba, Payet, Griezmann
(France) 2016	Semi-finals	Germany	2–0	W	Marseille	Griezmann (2)
(France) 2016	Final	Portugal	0–1 (a.e.t.)	L	Saint-Denis	—
(Europe) 2020	Group stage	Germany	1–0	W	Munich	Hummels (o.g.)
(Europe) 2020	Group stage	Hungary	1–1	D	Budapest	Griezmann
(Europe) 2020	Group stage	Portugal	2–2	D	Budapest	Benzema (2)
(Europe) 2020	Round of 16	Switzerland	3–3 (a.e.t.) (4–5 p)	D	Bucharest	Benzema (2), Pogba
(Germany) 2024	Group stage	Austria	1–0	W	Düsseldorf	Wöber (o.g.)
(Germany) 2024	Group stage	Netherlands	0–0	D	Leipzig	—
(Germany) 2024	Group stage	Poland	1–1	D	Dortmund	Mbappé
(Germany) 2024	Round of 16	Belgium	1–0	W	Düsseldorf	Vertonghen (o.g.)
(Germany) 2024	Quarter-finals	Portugal	0–0 (a.e.t.) (5–3 p)	D	Hamburg	—
(Germany) 2024	Semi-finals	Spain	1–2	L	Munich	Kolo Muani

== Head-to-head record ==
Opponent	Pld	W	D	L	GF	GA
Albania	1	1	0	0	2	0
Austria	1	1	0	0	1	0
Belgium	2	2	0	0	6	0
Bulgaria	1	1	0	0	3	1
Croatia	1	0	1	0	2	2
Czech Republic	3	1	1	1	2	3
Denmark	3	2	0	1	5	2
England	3	1	2	0	3	2
Germany	2	2	0	0	3	0
Greece	1	0	0	1	0	1
Hungary	1	0	1	0	1	1
Iceland	1	1	0	0	5	2
Ireland	1	1	0	0	2	1
Italy	2	1	0	1	2	3
Netherlands	4	0	2	2	3	7
Poland	1	0	1	0	1	1
Portugal	5	2	2	1	7	6
Romania	3	2	1	0	3	1
Serbia	2	1	0	1	7	7
Spain	5	2	1	2	6	6
Sweden	2	0	1	1	1	3
Switzerland	3	1	2	0	6	4
Ukraine	1	1	0	0	2	0
Total	49	23	15	11	73	53

== 1960 European Nations' Cup ==
=== Final tournament ===
Semi-finals

6 July 1960
20:00

France	4–5	Yugoslavia
Vincent 12'; Heutte 43', 62'; Wisniewski 53'	Report	Galić 11'; Žanetić 55'; Knez 75'; Jerković 78', 79'

Parc des Princes, Paris
Attendance: 26,370
Referee: Gaston Grandain (Belgium)

Third place play-off

9 July 1960
21:30

Czechoslovakia	2–0	France
Bubník 58'; Pavlovič 88'	Report

Stade Vélodrome, Marseille
Attendance: 9,438
Referee: Cesare Jonni (Italy)

== Euro 1984 ==
=== Group stage ===
Pos	Team	Pld	W	D	L	GF	GA	GD	Pts	Qualification
1	France (H)	3	3	0	0	9	2	+7	6	Advance to knockout stage
2	Denmark	3	2	0	1	8	3	+5	4	Advance to knockout stage
3	Belgium	3	1	0	2	4	8	−4	2	
4	Yugoslavia	3	0	0	3	2	10	−8	0	

Source: UEFA
Rules for classification: Group stage tiebreakers
(H) Hosts
12 June 1984
20:30

France	1–0	Denmark
Platini 78'	Report

Parc des Princes, Paris
Attendance: 47,570
Referee: Volker Roth (West Germany)

16 June 1984
17:15

France	5–0	Belgium
Platini 4', 74' (pen.), 89'; Giresse 33'; Fernández 43'	Report

Stade de la Beaujoire, Nantes
Attendance: 51,359
Referee: Bob Valentine (Scotland)

19 June 1984
20:30

France	3–2	Yugoslavia
Platini 59', 62', 77'	Report	Šestić 32'; D. Stojković 84' (pen.)

Stade Geoffroy-Guichard, Saint-Étienne
Attendance: 47,510
Referee: André Daina (Switzerland)

=== Knockout stage ===
Semi-finals

23 June 1984
20:00

France	3–2 (a.e.t.)	Portugal
Domergue 24', 114'; Platini 119'	Report	Jordão 74', 98'

Stade Vélodrome, Marseille
Attendance: 54,848
Referee: Paolo Bergamo (Italy)

Final

27 June 1984
20:00

France	2–0	Spain
Platini 57'; Bellone 90'	Report

Parc des Princes, Paris
Attendance: 47,368
Referee: Vojtech Christov (Czechoslovakia)

== Euro 1992 ==
=== Group stage ===
Pos	Team	Pld	W	D	L	GF	GA	GD	Pts	Qualification
1	Sweden (H)	3	2	1	0	4	2	+2	5	Advance to knockout stage
2	Denmark	3	1	1	1	2	2	0	3	Advance to knockout stage
3	France	3	0	2	1	2	3	−1	2	
4	England	3	0	2	1	1	2	−1	2	

Source: UEFA
Rules for classification: Group stage tiebreakers
(H) Hosts
10 June 1992
20:15

Sweden	1–1	France
J. Eriksson 24'	Report	Papin 58'

Råsunda Stadium, Solna
Attendance: 29,860
Referee: Alexey Spirin (CIS)

14 June 1992
17:15

France	0–0	England
	Report

Malmö Stadion, Malmö
Attendance: 26,535
Referee: Sándor Puhl (Hungary)

17 June 1992
20:15

France	1–2	Denmark
Papin 60'	Report	Larsen 8'; Elstrup 78'

Malmö Stadion, Malmö
Attendance: 25,763
Referee: Hubert Forstinger (Austria)

== Euro 1996 ==
=== Group stage ===
Pos	Team	Pld	W	D	L	GF	GA	GD	Pts	Qualification
1	France	3	2	1	0	5	2	+3	7	Advance to knockout stage
2	Spain	3	1	2	0	4	3	+1	5	Advance to knockout stage
3	Bulgaria	3	1	1	1	3	4	−1	4	
4	Romania	3	0	0	3	1	4	−3	0	

Source: UEFA
Rules for classification: Group stage tiebreakers
10 June 1996
19:30

Romania	0–1	France
	Report	Dugarry 25'

St James' Park, Newcastle
Attendance: 26,323
Referee: Hellmut Krug (Germany)

15 June 1996
18:00

France	1–1	Spain
Djorkaeff 48'	Report	Caminero 85'

Elland Road, Leeds
Attendance: 35,626
Referee: Vadim Zhuk (Belarus)

18 June 1996
16:30

France	3–1	Bulgaria
Blanc 21'; Penev 63' (o.g.); Loko 90'	Report	Stoichkov 69'

St James' Park, Newcastle
Attendance: 26,976
Referee: Dermot Gallagher (England) (Note: Gallagher suffered an injury in the 28th minute and was replaced by fourth official Paul Durkin (England).)

=== Knockout stage ===
Quarter-finals

22 June 1996
18:30

France	0–0 (a.e.t.)	Netherlands
	Report
Penalties
Zidane (penalty scored); Djorkaeff (penalty scored); Lizarazu (penalty scored); Guérin (penalty scored); Blanc (penalty scored)	5–4	(penalty scored) De Kock; (penalty scored) De Boer; (penalty scored) Kluivert; (penalty missed) Seedorf; (penalty scored) Blind

Anfield, Liverpool
Attendance: 37,465
Referee: Antonio López Nieto (Spain)

Semi-finals

26 June 1996
16:00

France	0–0 (a.e.t.)	Czech Republic
	Report
Penalties
Zidane (penalty scored); Djorkaeff (penalty scored); Lizarazu (penalty scored); Guérin (penalty scored); Blanc (penalty scored); Pedros (penalty missed)	5–6	(penalty scored) Kubík; (penalty scored) Nedvěd; (penalty scored) Berger; (penalty scored) Poborský; (penalty scored) Rada; (penalty scored) Kadlec

Old Trafford, Manchester
Attendance: 43,877
Referee: Leslie Mottram (Scotland)

== Euro 2000 ==
=== Group stage ===
Pos	Team	Pld	W	D	L	GF	GA	GD	Pts	Qualification
1	Netherlands (H)	3	3	0	0	7	2	+5	9	Advance to knockout stage
2	France	3	2	0	1	7	4	+3	6	Advance to knockout stage
3	Czech Republic	3	1	0	2	3	3	0	3	
4	Denmark	3	0	0	3	0	8	−8	0	

Source: UEFA
Rules for classification: Group stage tiebreakers
(H) Hosts
11 June 2000
18:00

France	3–0	Denmark
Blanc 16'; Henry 64'; Wiltord 90+2'	Report

Jan Breydel Stadium, Bruges
Attendance: 28,100
Referee: Günter Benkö (Austria)

16 June 2000
18:00

Czech Republic	1–2	France
Poborský 35' (pen.)	Report	Henry 7'; Djorkaeff 60'

Jan Breydel Stadium, Bruges
Attendance: 27,243
Referee: Graham Poll (England)

21 June 2000
20:45

France	2–3	Netherlands
Dugarry 8'; Trezeguet 31'	Report	Kluivert 14'; F. de Boer 51'; Zenden 59'

Amsterdam Arena, Amsterdam
Attendance: 50,000
Referee: Anders Frisk (Sweden)

=== Knockout stage ===
Quarter-finals

25 June 2000
20:45

Spain	1–2	France
Mendieta 38' (pen.)	Report	Zidane 32'; Djorkaeff 44'

Jan Breydel Stadium, Bruges
Attendance: 26,614
Referee: Pierluigi Collina (Italy)

Semi-finals

28 June 2000
20:45

France	2–1 (a.e.t./g.g.)	Portugal
Henry 51'; Zidane 117' (pen.)	Report	Nuno Gomes 19'

King Baudouin Stadium, Brussels
Attendance: 48,000
Referee: Günter Benkö (Austria)

Final

2 July 2000
20:00

France	2–1 (a.e.t./g.g.)	Italy
Wiltord 90+4'; Trezeguet 103'	Report	Delvecchio 55'

De Kuip, Rotterdam
Attendance: 48,100
Referee: Anders Frisk (Sweden)

== Euro 2004 ==
=== Group stage ===
Pos	Team	Pld	W	D	L	GF	GA	GD	Pts	Qualification
1	France	3	2	1	0	7	4	+3	7	Advance to knockout stage
2	England	3	2	0	1	8	4	+4	6	Advance to knockout stage
3	Croatia	3	0	2	1	4	6	−2	2	
4	Switzerland	3	0	1	2	1	6	−5	1	

Source: UEFA
Rules for classification: Group stage tiebreakers
13 June 2004
19:45

France	2–1	England
Zidane 90+1', 90+3' (pen.)	Report	Lampard 38'

Estádio da Luz, Lisbon
Attendance: 62,487
Referee: Markus Merk (Germany)

17 June 2004
19:45

Croatia	2–2	France
Rapaić 48' (pen.); Pršo 52'	Report	Tudor 22' (o.g.); Trezeguet 64'

Estádio Dr. Magalhães Pessoa, Leiria
Attendance: 29,160
Referee: Kim Milton Nielsen (Denmark)

21 June 2004
19:45

Switzerland	1–3	France
Vonlanthen 26'	Report	Zidane 20'; Henry 76', 84'

Estádio Cidade de Coimbra, Coimbra
Attendance: 28,111
Referee: Ľuboš Micheľ (Slovakia)

=== Knockout stage ===
Quarter-finals

25 June 2004
19:45

France	0–1	Greece
	Report	Charisteas 65'

Estádio José Alvalade, Lisbon
Attendance: 45,390
Referee: Anders Frisk (Sweden)

== Euro 2008 ==
=== Group stage ===
Pos	Team	Pld	W	D	L	GF	GA	GD	Pts	Qualification
1	Netherlands	3	3	0	0	9	1	+8	9	Advance to knockout stage
2	Italy	3	1	1	1	3	4	−1	4	Advance to knockout stage
3	Romania	3	0	2	1	1	3	−2	2	
4	France	3	0	1	2	1	6	−5	1	

Source: UEFA
Rules for classification: Group stage tiebreakers
9 June 2008
18:00

Romania	0–0	France
	Report

Letzigrund, Zürich
Attendance: 30,585
Referee: Manuel Mejuto González (Spain)

13 June 2008
20:45

Netherlands	4–1	France
Kuyt 9'; Van Persie 59'; Robben 72'; Sneijder 90+2'	Report	Henry 71'

Stade de Suisse, Bern
Attendance: 30,777
Referee: Herbert Fandel (Germany)

17 June 2008
20:45

France	0–2	Italy
	Report	Pirlo 25' (pen.); De Rossi 62'

Letzigrund, Zürich
Attendance: 30,585
Referee: Ľuboš Micheľ (Slovakia)

== Euro 2012 ==
=== Group stage ===
Pos	Team	Pld	W	D	L	GF	GA	GD	Pts	Qualification
1	England	3	2	1	0	5	3	+2	7	Advance to knockout stage
2	France	3	1	1	1	3	3	0	4	Advance to knockout stage
3	Ukraine (H)	3	1	0	2	2	4	−2	3 (Note: Head-to-head result: Ukraine 2–1 Sweden.)	
4	Sweden	3	1	0	2	5	5	0	3	

Source: UEFA
Rules for classification: Group stage tiebreakers
(H) Hosts
Notes:
11 June 2012
19:00 EEST

France	1–1	England
Nasri 39'	Report	Lescott 30'

Donbas Arena, Donetsk
Attendance: 47,400
Referee: Nicola Rizzoli (Italy)

15 June 2012
19:00 EEST

Ukraine	0–2	France
	Report	Ménez 53'; Cabaye 56'

Donbas Arena, Donetsk
Attendance: 48,000
Referee: Björn Kuipers (Netherlands)

19 June 2012
21:45 EEST

Sweden	2–0	France
Ibrahimović 54'; Larsson 90+1'	Report

Olympic Stadium, Kyiv
Attendance: 63,010
Referee: Pedro Proença (Portugal)

=== Knockout stage ===
Quarter-finals

23 June 2012
21:45 EEST

Spain	2–0	France
Alonso 19', 90+1' (pen.)	Report

Donbas Arena, Donetsk
Attendance: 47,000
Referee: Nicola Rizzoli (Italy)

== Euro 2016 ==
=== Group stage ===
Pos	Team	Pld	W	D	L	GF	GA	GD	Pts	Qualification
1	France (H)	3	2	1	0	4	1	+3	7	Advance to knockout stage
2	Switzerland	3	1	2	0	2	1	+1	5	Advance to knockout stage
3	Albania	3	1	0	2	1	3	−2	3	
4	Romania	3	0	1	2	2	4	−2	1	

Source: UEFA
Rules for classification: Group stage tiebreakers
(H) Hosts
10 June 2016
21:00

France	2–1	Romania
Giroud 57'; Payet 89'	Report	Stancu 65' (pen.)

Stade de France, Saint-Denis
Attendance: 75,113
Referee: Viktor Kassai (Hungary)

15 June 2016
21:00

France	2–0	Albania
Griezmann 90'; Payet 90+6'	Report

Stade Vélodrome, Marseille
Attendance: 63,670
Referee: Willie Collum (Scotland)

19 June 2016
21:00

Switzerland	0–0	France
	Report

Stade Pierre-Mauroy, Villeneuve-d'Ascq
Attendance: 45,616
Referee: Damir Skomina (Slovenia)

=== Knockout stage ===
Round of 16

26 June 2016
15:00

France	2–1	Republic of Ireland
Griezmann 58', 61'	Report	Brady 2' (pen.)

Parc Olympique Lyonnais, Décines-Charpieu
Attendance: 56,279
Referee: Nicola Rizzoli (Italy)

Quarter-finals

3 July 2016
21:00

France	5–2	Iceland
Giroud 12', 59'; Pogba 20'; Payet 43'; Griezmann 45'	Report	Sigþórsson 56'; B. Bjarnason 84'

Stade de France, Saint-Denis
Attendance: 76,833
Referee: Björn Kuipers (Netherlands)

Semi-finals

7 July 2016
21:00

Germany	0–2	France
	Report	Griezmann 45+2' (pen.), 72'

Stade Vélodrome, Marseille
Attendance: 64,078
Referee: Nicola Rizzoli (Italy)

Final

10 July 2016
21:00

Portugal	1–0 (a.e.t.)	France
Eder 109'	Report

Stade de France, Saint-Denis
Attendance: 75,868
Referee: Mark Clattenburg (England)

== Euro 2020 ==
=== Group stage ===
Pos	Team	Pld	W	D	L	GF	GA	GD	Pts	Qualification
1	France	3	1	2	0	4	3	+1	5	Advance to knockout stage
2	Germany (H)	3	1	1	1	6	5	+1	4 (Note: Head-to-head result: Portugal 2–4 Germany.)	Advance to knockout stage
3	Portugal	3	1	1	1	7	6	+1	4	Advance to knockout stage
4	Hungary (H)	3	0	2	1	3	6	−3	2	

Source: UEFA
Rules for classification: Group stage tiebreakers
(H) Hosts
Notes:
15 June 2021
21:00

France	1–0	Germany
Hummels 20' (o.g.)	Report

Allianz Arena, Munich
Attendance: 13,000
Referee: Carlos del Cerro Grande (Spain)

19 June 2021
15:00

Hungary	1–1	France
Fiola 45+2'	Report	Griezmann 66'

Puskás Aréna, Budapest
Attendance: 55,998
Referee: Michael Oliver (England)

23 June 2021
21:00

Portugal	2–2	France
Ronaldo 31' (pen.), 60' (pen.)	Report	Benzema 45+2' (pen.), 47'

Puskás Aréna, Budapest
Attendance: 54,886
Referee: Antonio Mateu Lahoz (Spain)

=== Knockout stage ===
Round of 16

28 June 2021
21:00 (22:00 UTC+3)

France	3–3 (a.e.t.)	Switzerland
Benzema 57', 59'; Pogba 75'	Report	Seferovic 15', 81'; Gavranović 90'
Penalties
Pogba (penalty scored); Giroud (penalty scored); Thuram (penalty scored); Kimpembe (penalty scored); Mbappé (penalty missed)	4–5	(penalty scored) Gavranović; (penalty scored) Schär; (penalty scored) Akanji; (penalty scored) Vargas; (penalty scored) Mehmedi

Arena Națională, Bucharest
Attendance: 22,642
Referee: Fernando Rapallini (Argentina)

== Euro 2024 ==
=== Group stage ===
Pos	Team	Pld	W	D	L	GF	GA	GD	Pts	Qualification
1	Austria	3	2	0	1	6	4	+2	6	Advance to knockout stage
2	France	3	1	2	0	2	1	+1	5	Advance to knockout stage
3	Netherlands	3	1	1	1	4	4	0	4	Advance to knockout stage
4	Poland	3	0	1	2	3	6	−3	1	

Source: UEFA
17 June 2024
21:00

Austria	0–1	France
	Report	Wöber 38' (o.g.)

Merkur Spiel-Arena, Düsseldorf
Attendance: 46,425
Referee: Jesús Gil Manzano (Spain)

21 June 2024
21:00

Netherlands	0–0	France
	Report

Red Bull Arena, Leipzig
Attendance: 38,531
Referee: Anthony Taylor (England)

25 June 2024
18:00

France	1–1	Poland
Mbappé 56' (pen.)	Report	Lewandowski 79' (pen.)

Westfalenstadion, Dortmund
Attendance: 59,728
Referee: Marco Guida (Italy)

=== Knockout stage ===
Round of 16

1 July 2024
18:00

France	1–0	Belgium
Vertonghen 85' (o.g.)	Report

Merkur Spiel-Arena, Düsseldorf
Attendance: 46,810
Referee: Glenn Nyberg (Sweden)

Quarter-finals

5 July 2024
21:00

Portugal	0–0 (a.e.t.)	France
	Report
Penalties
Ronaldo (penalty scored); B. Silva (penalty scored); Félix (penalty missed); Mendes (penalty scored)	3–5	(penalty scored) Dembélé; (penalty scored) Fofana; (penalty scored) Koundé; (penalty scored) Barcola; (penalty scored) Hernandez

Volksparkstadion, Hamburg
Attendance: 47,789
Referee: Michael Oliver (England)

Semi-finals

9 July 2024
21:00

Spain	2–1	France
Yamal 21'; Olmo 25'	Report	Kolo Muani 9'

Allianz Arena, Munich
Attendance: 62,042
Referee: Slavko Vinčić (Slovenia)

== Goalscorers ==
Player	Goals	1960	1984	1992	1996	2000	2004	2008	2012	2016	2020	2024
Michel Platini	9		9									
Antoine Griezmann	7									6	1	
Thierry Henry	6					3	2	1				
Zinedine Zidane	5					2	3					
Karim Benzema	4										4	
Youri Djorkaeff	3				1	2						
Olivier Giroud	3									3		
David Trezeguet	3					2	1					
Dimitri Payet	3									3		
Laurent Blanc	2				1	1						
Jean-Pierre Papin	2			2								
Paul Pogba	2									1	1	
Jean-François Domergue	2		2									
Christophe Dugarry	2				1	1						
François Heutte	2	2										
Sylvain Wiltord	2					2						
Bruno Bellone	1		1									
Yohan Cabaye	1								1			
Luis Fernandez	1		1									
Alain Giresse	1		1									
Randal Kolo Muani	1											1
Patrice Loko	1				1							
Kylian Mbappé	1											1
Jérémy Ménez	1								1			
Samir Nasri	1								1			
Jean Vincent	1	1										
Maryan Wisnieski	1	1										
Own goals	5				1		1				1	2
Total	73	4	14	2	5	13	7	1	3	13	7	4

== See also ==
- France at the FIFA Confederations Cup
- France at the FIFA World Cup
- France in the UEFA Nations League
