= France at the FIFA Confederations Cup =

Football tournament results

France appeared in two of the ten FIFA Confederations Cups contested and won the competition on both appearances. The team's two titles make them the second most successful team of the competition, only trailing Brazil which won four titles. France won their first Confederations Cup in 2001 having appeared in the competition as a result of winning the FIFA World Cup in 1998 and the UEFA European Championship in 2000. The team defeated Japan 1–0 in the final match. In the following Confederations Cup in 2003, France, appearing in the competition as the host country, once again won the competition, beating Cameroon 1–0 after extra time in the final.

== Record ==
FIFA Confederations Cup record
Year	Round	Position	Pld	W	D*	L	GF	GA	Squad
(Saudi Arabia) 1992	Did not qualify								
(Saudi Arabia) 1995	Did not qualify								
(Saudi Arabia) 1997	Did not qualify								
(Mexico) 1999	Did not enter								
(South Korea) (Japan) 2001	Champions	1st	5	4	0	1	12	2	Squad
(France) 2003	Champions	1st	5	5	0	0	12	3	Squad
(Germany) 2005	Did not qualify								
(South Africa) 2009	Did not qualify								
(Brazil) 2013	Did not qualify								
(Russia) 2017	Did not qualify								
Total	2 Titles	2/10	10	9	0	1	24	5	—

France's Confederations Cup record
First Match	France France 5–0 South Korea (30 May 2001; Daegu, South Korea)
Biggest Win	France 5–0 South Korea (30 May 2001; Daegu, South Korea); France 5–0 New Zealand (22 June 2003; Saint-Denis, France)
Biggest Defeat	Australia 1–0 France (1 June 2001; Daegu, South Korea)
Best Result	Champions in 2001 and 2003
Worst Result	—

== 2001 FIFA Confederations Cup ==
=== Group A ===
Team	Pld	W	D	L	GF	GA	GD	Pts
France	3	2	0	1	9	1	+8	6
Australia	3	2	0	1	3	1	+2	6
South Korea	3	2	0	1	3	6	−3	6
Mexico	3	0	0	3	1	8	−7	0

30 May 2001
17:00 KST

France	5–0	South Korea
Marlet 9'; Vieira 19'; Anelka 34'; Djorkaeff 80'; Wiltord 90'	Report

Daegu World Cup Stadium, Daegu
Attendance: 61,500
Referee: Gamal Al-Ghandour (Egypt)

1 June 2001
17:00 KST

Australia	1–0	France
Zane 60'	Report

Daegu World Cup Stadium, Daegu
Attendance: 44,400
Referee: Carlos Batres (Guatemala)

3 June 2001
19:30 KST

France	4–0	Mexico
Wiltord 9'; Carrière 63', 84'; Pires 72'	Report

Ulsan Munsu Football Stadium, Ulsan
Attendance: 28,864
Referee: Ali Bujsaim (United Arab Emirates)

Knockout stage

Semi-finals

7 June 2001
20:00 KST

France	2–1	Brazil
Pires 7'; Desailly 54'	Report	Ramon 30'

Suwon World Cup Stadium, Suwon
Attendance: 34,527
Referee: Gamal Al-Ghandour (Egypt)

Final

10 June 2001
19:00 JST

Japan	0–1	France
	Report	Vieira 30'

International Stadium Yokohama, Yokohama
Attendance: 65,533
Referee: Ali Bujsaim (United Arab Emirates)

== 2003 FIFA Confederations Cup ==
Group A

Team	Pld	W	D	L	GF	GA	GD	Pts
France	3	3	0	0	8	1	+7	9
Colombia	3	2	0	1	4	2	+2	6
Japan	3	1	0	2	4	3	+1	3
New Zealand	3	0	0	3	1	11	−10	0

18 June 2003
21:00 CEST

France	1–0	Colombia
Henry 39' (pen.)	Report

Stade de Gerland, Lyon
Attendance: 38,541
Referee: Lucílio Batista (Portugal)

20 June 2003
21:00 CEST

France	2–1	Japan
Pires 43' (pen.); Govou 65'	Report	Nakamura 59'

Stade Geoffroy-Guichard, Saint-Étienne
Attendance: 33,070
Referee: Mark Shield (Australia)

22 June 2003
21:00 CEST

France	5–0	New Zealand
Kapo 17'; Henry 20'; Cissé 71'; Giuly 90+1'; Pires 90+3'	Report

Stade de France, Saint-Denis
Attendance: 36,842
Referee: Masoud Moradi (Iran)

Knockout stage

Semi-finals

26 June 2003
21:00 CEST

France	3–2	Turkey
Henry 11'; Pires 26'; Wiltord 43'	Report	Gökdeniz 42'; Tuncay 48'

Stade de France, Saint-Denis
Attendance: 41,195
Referee: Jorge Larrionda (Uruguay)

Final

29 June 2003
21:00 CEST

Cameroon	0–1 (a.e.t.)	France
	Report	Henry 97'

Stade de France, Saint-Denis
Attendance: 51,985
Referee: Valentin Ivanov (Russia)

== Goalscorers ==
Rank	Player	Goals	Confederations Cups
1	Robert Pires	5	2001 (2) & 2003 (3)
2	Thierry Henry	4	20003
3	Eric Carrière	3	2001 (2) & 2003 (1)
3	Sylvain Wiltord	3	2001 (2) & 2003 (1)
5	Patrick Vieira	2	2001
6
6	Nicolas Anelka	1	2001
6	Marcel Desailly	1	2001
6	Youri Djorkaeff	1	2001
6	Steve Marlet	1	20001
6	Ludovic Giuly	1	20003
6	Sidney Govou	1	20003
6	Olivier Kapo	1	20003

== See also ==
- France at the FIFA World Cup
- France at the UEFA European Championship
- France at the UEFA Nations League
