= Eric Gerets =

Belgian football manager and former player

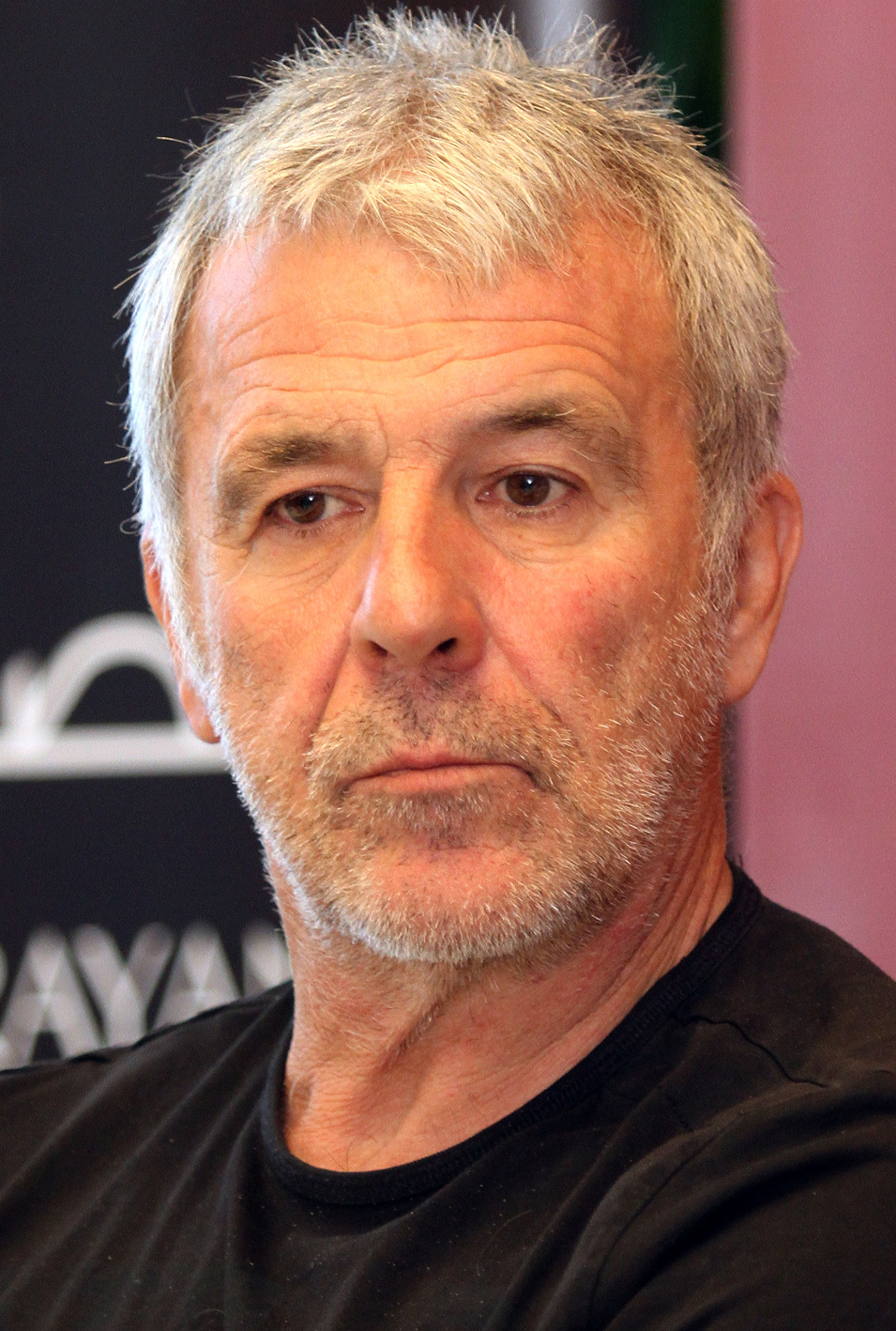
- Gerets in 2012

Personal information
- Full name: Eric Maria Gerets
- Date of birth: 18 May 1954 (age 72)
- Place of birth: Rekem, Belgium
- Height: 1.82 m (6 ft 0 in)
- Position: Right-back

Youth career
- 1964–1971: AA Rekem

Senior career*
Years	Team	Apps	(Gls)
1971–1983	Standard Liège	318	(23)
1983–1984	AC Milan	13	(1)
1984–1985	MVV	12	(0)
1985–1992	PSV	200	(8)
Total		543	(32)

International career
1975–1991	Belgium	86	(2)

Managerial career
- 1992–1994: RFC Liège
- 1994–1997: Lierse
- 1997–1999: Club Brugge
- 1999–2002: PSV
- 2002–2004: 1. FC Kaiserslautern
- 2004–2005: VfL Wolfsburg
- 2005–2007: Galatasaray
- 2007–2009: Marseille
- 2009–2010: Al Hilal
- 2010–2012: Morocco
- 2012–2014: Lekhwiya
- 2014–2015: Al Jazira
Medal record
Representing Belgium
UEFA European Championship
Runner-up	1980
Representing Morocco (as manager)
FIFA Arab Cup
Winner	2012 Arab Cup
- * Club domestic league appearances and goals

Eric Maria Gerets (Dutch pronunciation: [ˈeːrɪk ˈxeːrəts]; (Note: In isolation, Gerets is pronounced [ˈɣeːrəts].) born 18 May 1954) is a Belgian former professional football manager and player. Nicknamed "The Lion (of Flanders)", he was regarded as one of the top right-backs in Europe at his peak and is considered one of the greatest players in Belgian football history.

Gerets started his playing career as a striker for local amateur team AA Rekem, before achieving success as a right-back with Standard Liège and PSV. He captained PSV to their first and only European Cup win in 1988.

As a coach, Gerets is one of six managers – along with José Mourinho, Carlo Ancelotti, Giovanni Trapattoni, Tomislav Ivić and Ernst Happel – to have won domestic league championships in at least four countries.

== Club career ==
Gerets began his career playing for amateur side AA Rekem before joining then titleholders Standard de Liège. Making his debut 16 April 1972 coming on for Silvester Takač against FC Diest. In the 1972–73 season Standard reached the Cup final, manager Vlatko Marković let Gerets start despite not being an established first team member as Standard lost 2–1 to fierce rivals Anderlecht. The following season, Gerets replaced 29-year-old Jacques Beurlet and became the first choice right-back for the Rouches. In 1975 Gerets made his debut for the national team.

Gerets played for Standard Liège, A.C. Milan, MVV Maastricht and PSV, winning among others the 1987–88 European Cup, two Belgian championships and six Dutch championships.

Gerets was an offensively-minded right-back, known for his stamina, tactical discipline, grit and mental toughness. In combination with his physical appearance (hair blowing in the wind, a full but elegant beard, slumped trunk) he was soon nicknamed "The Lion". He was also known for long distance throw-ins.

=== Standard Liège ===
In the 1980s, a new generation of players emerged at Standard. Noted manager Ernst Happel was hired, and later the club brought Raymond Goethals back to Belgium. Players like Arie Haan, Guy Vandersmissen, Michel Preud'homme, Walter Meeuws, Jos Daerden and Simon Tahamata became key players, whilst Gerets was the captain of the team. In 1980, Standard finished runners-up in the league, before winning the 1981 National Cup with a 4–1 win over Lokeren SC. In 1982, Standard won the title by beating Waterschei SV Thor in the last match of the season. A few days later, they faced Barcelona in the European Cup Winners' Cup final, which they lost 2–1. The influence of Gerets on Standard's success was recognised when he was awarded the 1982 Belgian Golden Shoe. The following year he captained Standard to another league title, their ninth overall, which would prove to be their last until 2007–08.

With Standard, Gerets eventually won 2 national titles, a National Cup, a Super Cup and a League Cup.

=== AC Milan ===
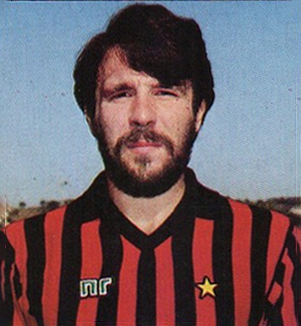
Gerets with AC Milan in 1983

Gerets signed with Italian giants AC Milan in 1983. However, his contract was terminated prematurely, but not for sporting reasons. It was discovered that, in order to secure the championship title and to spare players from injuries for the European final against Barcelona, Standard had approached the Waterschei players in 1982 to take it easy in their final league match against Standard. Several Standard players at the time and trainer Raymond Goethals were subsequently suspended for this.

=== MVV ===
MVV Maastricht contracted Gerets in 1984, but he would eventually only play four matches for the club. Three of those were against PSV, after which the Eindhoven club was convinced and quickly signed the Belgian to a contract in the summer of 1985.

=== PSV ===
In 1985, Gerets joined PSV playing together with Ruud Gullit, Frank Arnesen, Huub Stevens and Willy van de Kerkhof followed by Brazilian star Romário. In 1986, Gerets won the title with PSV, and after the departure of Gullit in 1987, Gerets became the new captain. Under Guus Hiddink PSV won the league and cup double three consecutive seasons, Gerets scoring twice in the 1987–88 cup final against Roda JC. In 1988, PSV reached the UEFA European Cup final after eliminating Real Madrid in the semi-finals. The score against Benfica was also 0–0 after 120 minutes; PSV eventually won on penalties.

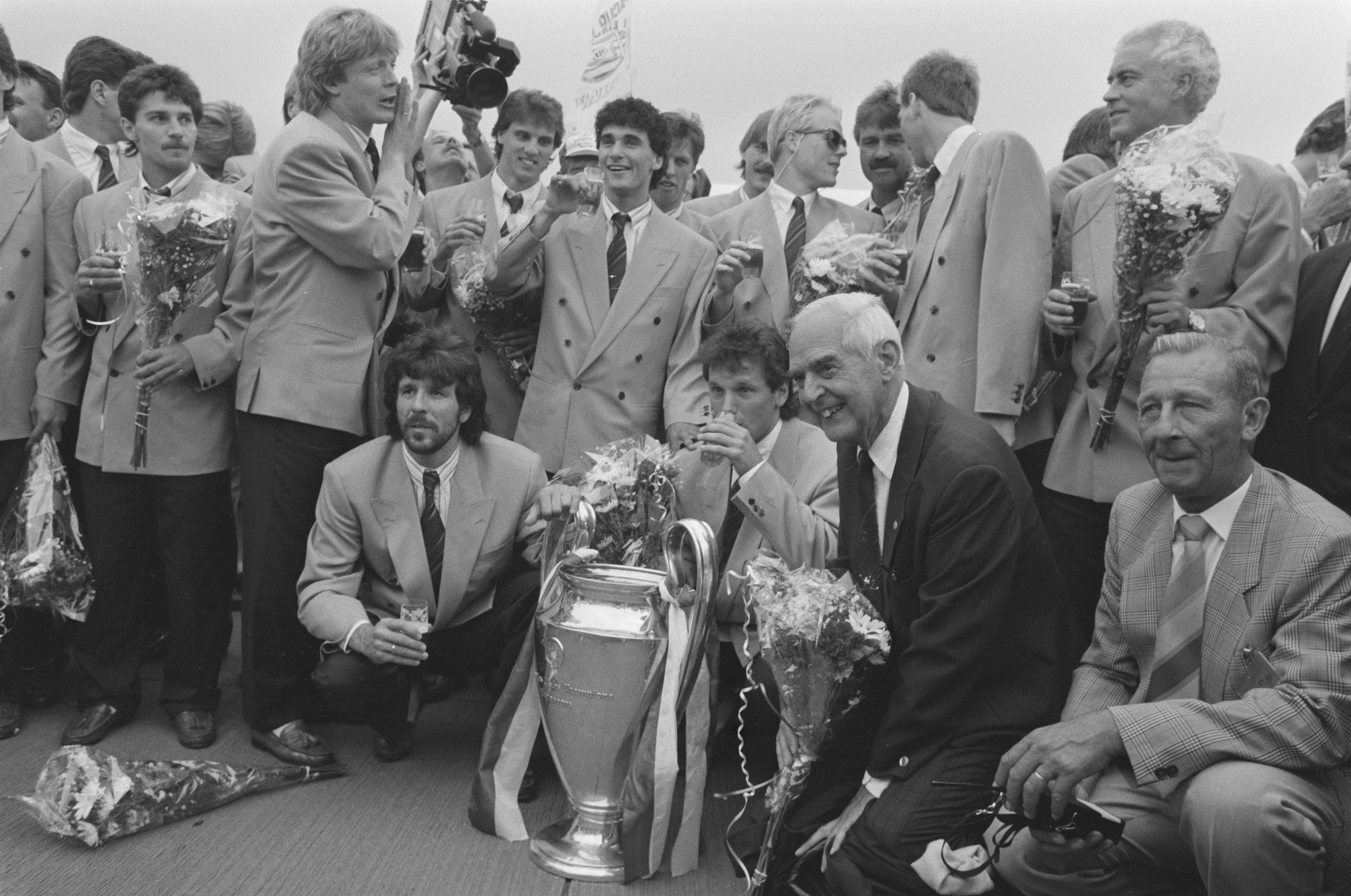
Gerets (left) and Frits Philips (right) posing with the European Cup

In 1990, Bobby Robson was appointed as Hiddink's successor. Under Robson, Gerets won another two titles with PSV then he retired at the end of the 1991–1992 season at the age of 38. In his seven seasons at the club, Gerets had won six national titles, three national cups and one European cup.

In the following years, Gerets would be regularly honored as a true club icon ("Best PSV team ever", "PSV player of the century", "PSV Walk of Fame").

== International career ==
Gerets registered 86 caps for the Belgium national team. He made his debut for the squad in 1975, and played at four major tournaments: the 1980 European Championship, 1982 World Cup, 1986 World Cup, and 1990 World Cup.

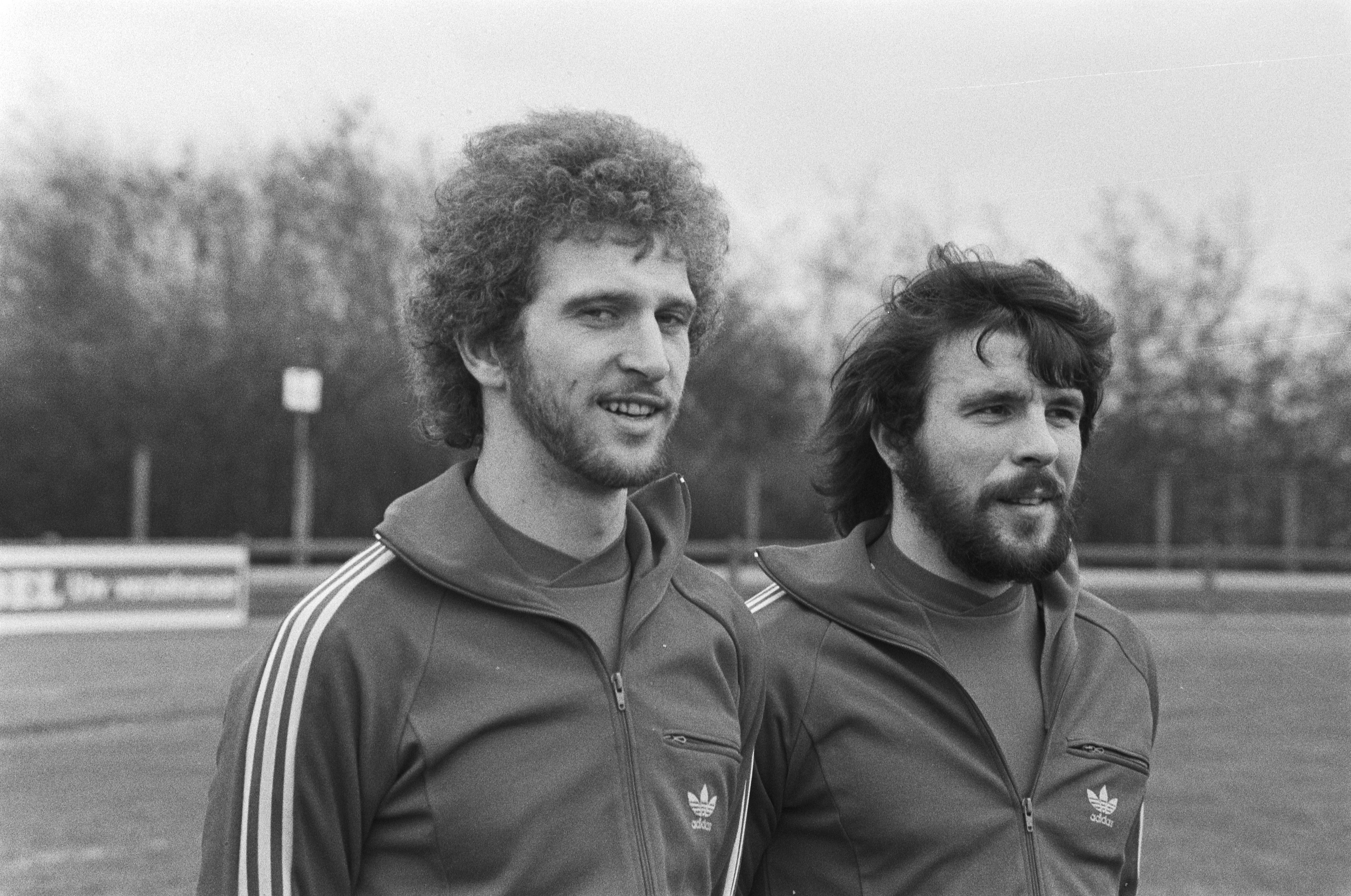
Ludo Coeck and Gerets during a training of Belgium in 1980

In 1980, Gerets played in his first European Championship in Italy. He scored the opening goal in a 2–1 win against Spain which ensured Belgium qualified as group winners. The tournament is remembered for the inspired performance of the offensively-minded Belgium (around rising stars such as Jan Ceulemans, Eric Gerets, Jean-Marie Pfaff and Erwin Vandenbergh) who unexpectedly reached the final, only losing to West Germany (1–2) by a Hrubesch goal two minutes from time.

At the 1982 World Cup, Belgium, captained by Gerets, recorded one of their most famous victories with a 1–0 win over defending champions Argentina in the first game of the tournament held at Camp Nou with a goal by Erwin Vandenbergh, and an excellent defensive display to hold off a young Diego Maradona. Four years later, they achieved their best World Cup run at that time in 1986 when they placed fourth under command of players like Jan Ceulemans, Jean-Marie Pfaff and captain Gerets. Belgium surprisingly won against favourites the Soviet Union with stars such as Igor Belanov and Rinat Dasayev (3–4) after extra time.

"The best right back in the world."

— Johan Cruyff on Gerets

Belgium also beat Spain on penalties, but they lost to eventual champions Argentina in the semi-final (0–2), inspired by Maradona.

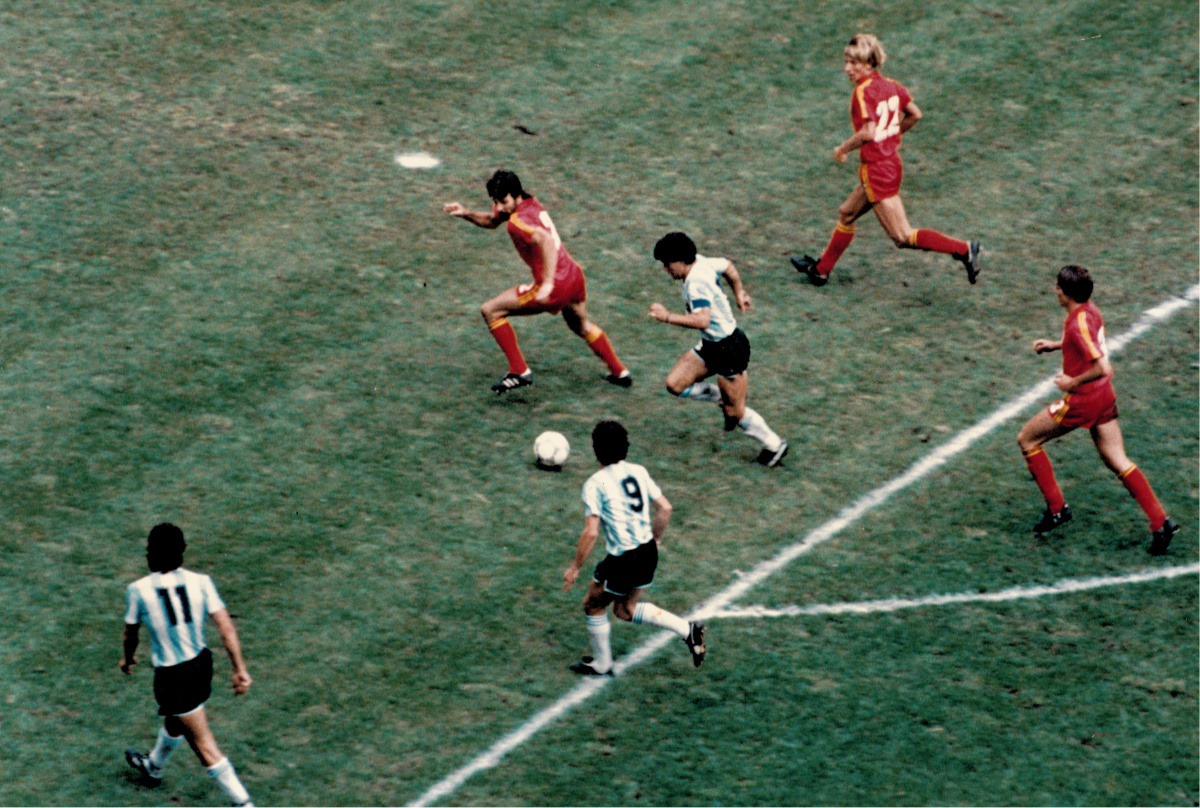
Gerets trying to stop Maradona in the semi-finals of the 1986 World Cup

Despite their defeat, Belgium would end up in fourth place – their best finish in World Cup competition until it was surpassed in 2018 when they reached third place.

36 year-old Gerets would also captain his nation to the 1990 World Cup finals. Belgium failed to convert their chances against England in the second round. They lost in the last minute of extra time after a goal by David Platt. After a few qualification matches for the 1992 European championship, Gerets decided to quit international football early 1991 to focus on his club career with PSV Eindhoven.

For decades, he was the third-most capped player for the Belgium national team, with 86 appearances and two goals.

== Managerial career ==
As a manager, Gerets worked successively for RFC Liège, Lierse, Club Brugge, PSV, 1. FC Kaiserslautern and VfL Wolfsburg before joining Galatasaray at the end of the 2004–05 season. In the 1996–97 season, he won the Belgian championships with Lierse, reprising the feat in the season 1997–98 with Club Brugge. He also won the Dutch championships twice (1999–2000 and 2000–01) with PSV. In the 2005–06 season, Gerets won the Turkish Premier Super League with Galatasaray. In May 2007, he left the club, and on 25 September became Marseille's coach.

In his first year with Marseille in 2007, he managed to get the team from the bottom of the league up to finish their 2007–08 season in third place. In 2009, Gerets turned down an offer of the RBFA to coach the Belgian national team after Rene Vandereycken was sacked. On 29 April 2009, he confirmed that he would not be in charge of Marseille after the summer when his contract expired. On 26 May 2009, he signed a contract to take over as head coach of Saudi club Al-Hilal for two years for an annual fee of €1.8 million.

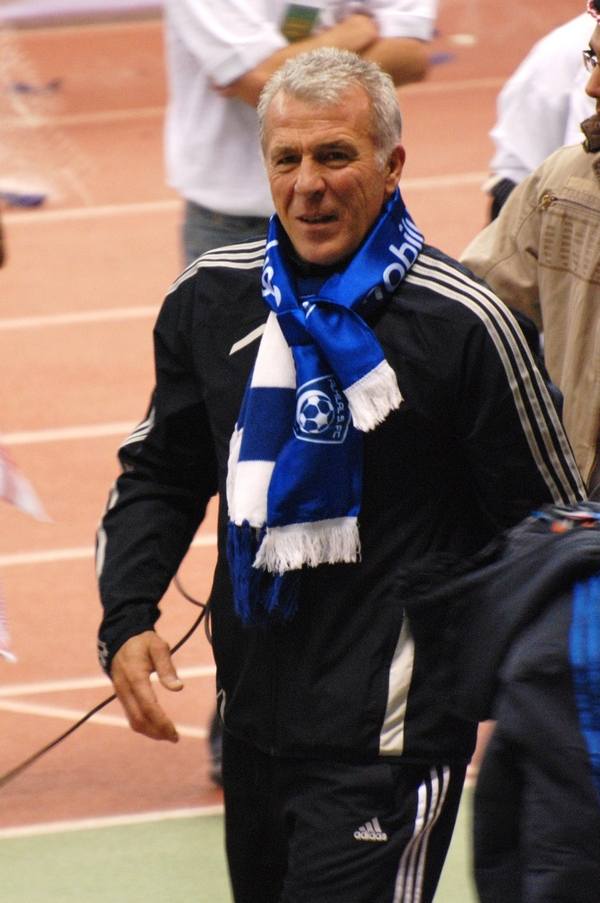
Gerets after winning the 2009–10 Saudi Pro League with Al Hilal

On 6 July 2010, he signed a four-year contract with Morocco. He would do the job part-time until he completed the Asian Champions League campaign with Al Hilal but stranded in the semi-finals. He was in charge of Morocco for almost two years. He was sacked on 15 September 2012 after a Morocco's 2–0 defeat against Mozambique in the first-leg of the 2013 Africa Cup of Nations qualification.

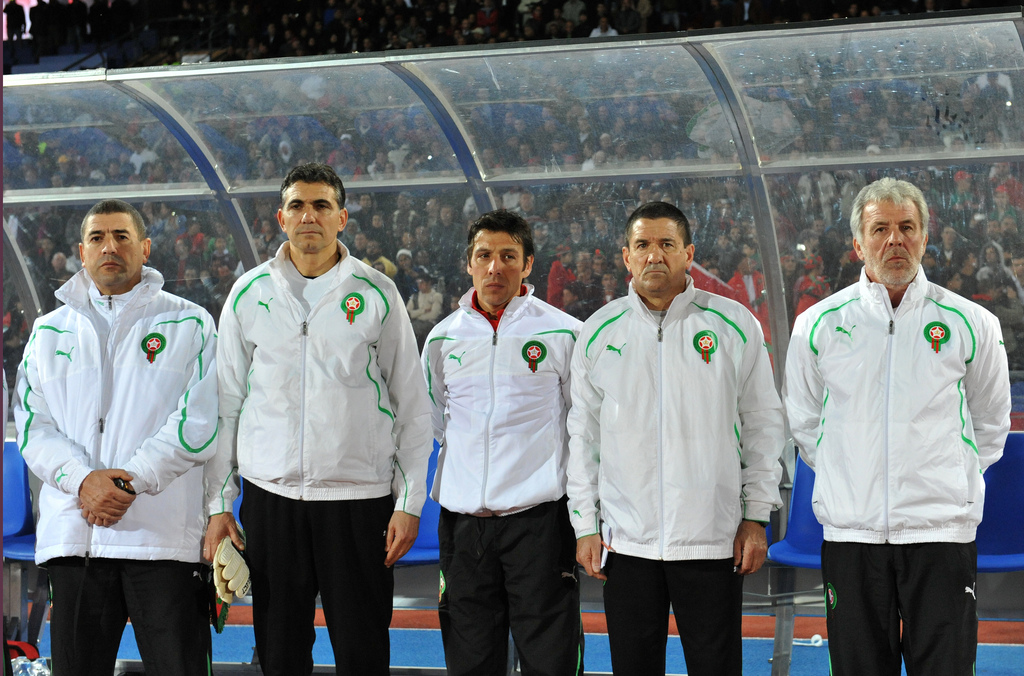
Gerets (far right) as Morocco manager in 2011

Less than a month after leaving Morocco, he accepted a contract offer to become the head coach of Qatari defending champions Lekhwiya on 9 October 2012. In the 2013–14 season, he brought another Qatari championship title to Lekhwiya.

Gerets departed Lekhwiya and became the head coach of the United Arab Emirates team Al Jazira Club on 20 May 2014. He completed his two-year contract and decided to retire as club coach.

He did hint that he might only be active as a coach of a country. Gerets was subsequently regularly mentioned as a top candidate for the position of head coach of Belgium. But due to health problems, he would never become it.

== Personal life ==
In 2013, Gerets suffered a brain hemorrhage. Since then, his health has gradually deteriorated and he has difficulty speaking and walking. In 2022, he was diagnosed with cerebral calcification.

== Career statistics ==
=== Club ===
Appearances and goals by club, season and competition
Club	Season	League			National cup (Note: Includes Belgian Cup, Coppa Italia, KNVB Cup)		Europe		Other		Total	
Club	Season	Division	Apps	Goals	Apps	Goals	Apps	Goals	Apps	Goals	Apps	Goals
Standard Liège	1971–72	First Division	1	0	—		—		—		1	0
Standard Liège	1972–73	First Division	9	0	2	0	—		—		11	0
Standard Liège	1973–74	First Division	30	1	—		12 (Note: 6 appearances in UEFA Cup, 6 appearances in UEFA Intertoto Cup)	0	2 (Note: Appearances in Belgian League Cup)	0	44	1
Standard Liège	1974–75	First Division	37	5	3	1	1 (Note: Appearances in UEFA Intertoto Cup)	0	2	0	43	6
Standard Liège	1975–76	First Division	34	6	—		1	0	—		35	6
Standard Liège	1976–77	First Division	31	1	2	0	6	1	—		39	2
Standard Liège	1977–78	First Division	25	2	3	0	6 (Note: Appearances in UEFA Cup)	0	—		34	2
Standard Liège	1978–79	First Division	33	4	3	0	4	0	—		40	4
Standard Liège	1979–80	First Division	27	3	6	0	9 (Note: 6 appearances in UEFA Cup, 3 appearances in UEFA Intertoto Cup)	0	—		42	3
Standard Liège	1980–81	First Division	29	0	6	0	10 (Note: 7 appearances in UEFA Cup, 3 appearances in UEFA Intertoto Cup)	0	—		45	0
Standard Liège	1981–82	First Division	31	3	—		10 (Note: 9 appearances in UEFA Cup Winners' Cup, 1 appearance in UEFA Intertoto Cup)	0	—		41	3
Standard Liège	1982–83	First Division	33	2	1	0	1 (Note: Appearances in European Champion Clubs' Cup)	1	—		35	3
Standard Liège	Total		320	27	26	1	60	2	4	0	410	30
AC Milan	1983–84	Serie A	13	1	7	0	—		—		20	1
AC Milan	Total		13	1	7	0	0	0	0	0	20	1
MVV Maastricht	1984–85	Eredivisie	12	0	2	0	—		—		14	0
MVV Maastricht	Total		12	0	2	0	0	0	0	0	14	0
PSV Eindhoven	1985–86	Eredivisie	29	0	2	0	3	0	—		34	0
PSV Eindhoven	1986–87	Eredivisie	30	1	3	0	2	0	—		35	1
PSV Eindhoven	1987–88	Eredivisie	30	4	5	2	9	0	—		44	6
PSV Eindhoven	1988–89	Eredivisie	31	1	5	0	5 (Note: 4 appearances in European Champion Clubs' Cup, 1 appearance in UEFA Super Cup)	0	2 (Note: Appearances in Intercontinental Cup)	0	43	1
PSV Eindhoven	1989–90	Eredivisie	33	1	5	0	6	0	—		44	1
PSV Eindhoven	1990–91	Eredivisie	24	0	3	0	1 (Note: Appearances in UEFA Cup Winners' Cup)	0	—		28	0
PSV Eindhoven	1991–92	Eredivisie	23	1	1	0	3	0	—		27	1
PSV Eindhoven	Total		200	8	24	2	29	0	2	0	225	10
Career total			545	36	59	3	89	2	6	0	699	41

=== International ===
National Team	Year	Friendlies		European Championships		World Cup		Total	
National Team	Year	Apps	Goals	Apps	Goals	Apps	Goals	Apps	Goals
Belgium	1975	0	0	0	0	1	0	1	0
Belgium	1976	0	0	2	0	1	0	3	0
Belgium	1977	2	0	2	0	0	0	4	0
Belgium	1978	2	0	0	0	2	0	4	0
Belgium	1979	1	0	6	0	0	0	7	0
Belgium	1980	4	0	4	1	3	0	11	1
Belgium	1981	1	0	0	0	4	0	5	0
Belgium	1982	4	0	2	0	3	0	9	0
Belgium	1983	2	0	4	0	0	0	6	0
Belgium	1984	0	0	0	0	0	0	0	0
Belgium	1985	0	0	0	0	3	0	3	0
Belgium	1986	3	0	2	1	6	0	11	1
Belgium	1987	2	0	3	0	0	0	5	0
Belgium	1988	0	0	0	0	1	0	1	0
Belgium	1989	1	0	0	0	5	0	6	0
Belgium	1990	4	0	0	0	3	0	8	0
Belgium	1991	1	0	1	0	0	0	2	0
Total		27	0	27	2	32	0	86	2

List of international goals scored by Eric Gerets
#	Date	Venue	Opponent	Score	Result	Competition
1.	15 June 1980	Stadio Giuseppe Meazza, Milan	Spain	1–0	2–1	Euro 1980
2.	14 October 1986	Stade Municipal, Luxembourg	Luxembourg	1–0	6–0	Euro 1988 qualifier

== Managerial statistics ==
Team	From	To	Record				
Team	From	To	G	W	D	L	Win %
Liège	July 1992	June 1994	71	20	19	32	28.17
Lierse	July 1994	June 1997	113	55	29	29	48.67
Club Brugge	June 1997	June 1999	91	60	15	16	65.93
PSV	July 1999	May 2002	141	86	29	26	60.99
1. FC Kaiserslautern	September 2002	February 2004	58	19	13	26	32.76
VfL Wolfsburg	April 2004	May 2005	44	18	5	21	40.91
Galatasaray	June 2005	May 2007	91	50	22	19	54.95
Marseille	September 2007	June 2009	97	47	23	27	48.45
Al-Hilal	July 2009	November 2010	48	35	7	6	72.92
Morocco	July 2010	September 2012	18	7	5	6	38.89
Lekhwiya	October 2012	May 2014	77	44	13	20	57.14
Al-Jazira	June 2014	June 2015	27	16	3	8	59.26
Total			876	457	183	236	52.17

== Honours ==
=== Player ===
Standard Liège

- Belgian First Division: 1981–82, 1982–83
- Belgian Cup: 1980–81
- Belgian Super Cup: 1981
- Belgian League Cup: 1975
- European Cup Winners' Cup runner-up: 1981–82
- UEFA Intertoto Cup group winner: 1980, 1982

PSV

- Eredivisie: 1985–86, 1986–87, 1987–88, 1988–89, 1990–91, 1991–92, runner-up: 1989–90
- KNVB Cup: 1987–88, 1988–89 1989–90
- European Cup: 1987–88
- Teresa Herrera Trophy: 1988

Belgium

- UEFA European Championship runner-up: 1980
- FIFA World Cup fourth place: 1986
- Belgian Sports Merit Award: 1980

Individual

- Belgian Golden Shoe: 1982
- Bronze Shoe: 1981
- Ballon d'Or nominations: 1982, 1983
- Don Balón World Cup All-Star team: 1982
- Onze de Onze: 1982, 1983, 1988
- Guerin Sportivo All-Star Team: 1982, 1983
- France Football + La Gazzetta dello Sport World Cup All-Star team: 1986
- Belgian Golden Shoe of the 20th Century 8th place: 1995
- Voetbal International's 50 World Stars by Raf Willems: 1999
- PSV Player of the Century: 1999
- Platina 11 (Best Team in 50 Years Golden Shoe Winners): 2003
- UEFA Jubilee Poll (2004): #81
- The Best Golden Shoe Team Ever: 2011
- RBFA 125 Years Icons Team: 2020
- AD The Best PSV Team Ever: 2020
- DH The Best Standard Liège Team Ever: 2020
- IFFHS All Time Belgium Dream Team: 2021
- Standard Liège Hall of Fame: 2024
- Belgian Pro League Hall of Fame: 2024
- PSV Walk of Fame: 2024

=== Manager ===
Lierse

- Belgian First Division: 1996–97

Club Brugge

- Belgian First Division: 1997–98
- Belgian Cup runner-up: 1997–98
- Belgian Super Cup: 1998

PSV

- Eredivisie: 1999–2000, 2000–01, runner-up: 2001–02
- Johan Cruyff Shield: 2000, 2001
- KNVB Cup runner-up: 2000–01

1. FC Kaiserslautern

- DFB-Pokal runner-up: 2002–03

Galatasaray

- Süper Lig: 2005–06

Marseille

- Ligue 1 runner up: 2008–09

Al Hilal

- Saudi Professional League: 2009–10
- Saudi Crown Prince Cup: 2010
- King's Cup of Champions runner-up: 2010

Morocco

- Arab Cup: 2012

Lekhwiya

- Qatar Stars League: 2013–14, runner-up: 2012–13
- Crown Prince Cup: 2013, runner-up: 2014

Al-Jazira

- UAE Pro League runner-up: 2014–15

Individual

- Belgian Professional Manager of the Year: 1996–97, 1997–98
- Ligue 1 Manager of the Year: 2008–09
- Raymond Goethals Trophy: 2011
