= 1981 Belgian Cup final =

- Event: 1980–81 Belgian Cup
| Standard Liège | Sporting Lokeren |
| 4 | 0 |
- Date: 7 June 1981
- Venue: Heizel Stadium, Brussels
- Referee: Alexis Ponnet
- Attendance: 46,035

The 1981 Belgian Cup final, took place on 7 June 1981 between Standard Liège and Sporting Lokeren. It was the 26th Belgian Cup final and Standard Liège won the match 4-0.

== Route to the final ==
| Standard Liège | | | | Lokeren |
|---|---|---|---|---|---|---|
| Opponent | Result | Legs | Round | Opponent | Result | Legs |
| Tilleur FC | 1–0 | 1–0 away | Round of 64 | KFC Herentals | 3-1 | 3–1 home |
| Berchem Sport | 3–0 | 3–0 home | Round of 32 | Mechelen | 1–0 | 1–0 home |
| Charleroi | 3–0 | 3–0 away | Round of 16 | RFC Liège | 4–1 | 4–1 home |
| Antwerp | 6–2 | 3–1 away; 3–1 home | Quarter-finals | Beveren | 5–2 | 2–2 away; 3–0 home |
| Thor Waterschei | 8–4 | 2–5 away; 3–2 home | Semi-finals | Lierse SK | 5–1 | 1–1 away; 4–0 home |

== Match ==
=== Details ===
7 June 1981
16:00 CET

| Standard Liège | 4–0 | Lokeren |
|---|---|---|
| Edström 24'; Daerden 63'; Tahamata 69'; Önal 90' |

Heizel Stadium, Brussels
Attendance: 46,035
Referee: Alexis Ponnet

| Standard Liège | Lokeren |

| GK | (Belgium) Michel Preud'homme |
| RB | (Belgium) Eric Gerets |
| CB | (Belgium) Michel Renquin |
| CB | (Turkey) Erhan Önal |
| LB | (Belgium) Gerard Plessers |
| MF | (Belgium) Guy Vandersmissen |
| MF | (Belgium) Jos Daerden |
| MF | (Iceland) Ásgeir Sigurvinsson | (substituted off) 6' |
| MF | (Netherlands) Simon Tahamata |
| FW | (Belgium) Eddy Voordeckers |
| FW | (Sweden) Ralf Edström | (substituted off) 77' |
Substitutes:
| CB | (Belgium) Theo Poel | (substituted on) 6' |
| MF | (Belgium) Willy Wellens | (substituted on) 77' |
Manager:
(Austria) Ernst Happel

| GK | (Netherlands) Bouke Hoogenboom |
| RB | (Czech Republic) Karol Dobiaš |
| CB | (Belgium) Maurits De Schrijver |
| CB | (Belgium) Roland Ingels | (substituted off) 73' |
| LB | (Belgium) Ronald Somers |
| MF | (Poland) Grzegorz Lato |
| MF | (Belgium) Eddy Snelders |
| MF | (Belgium) René Verheyen |
| MF | (Belgium) Raymond Mommens |
| FW | (Denmark) Preben Elkjær Larsen | (substituted off) 64' |
| FW | (Poland) Włodzimierz Lubański |
Substitutes:
| FW | (Iceland) Arnór Guðjohnsen | (substituted on) 64' |
| CB | (Belgium) Bob Dalving | (substituted on) 73' |
Manager:
(Belgium) Urbain Haesaert

Match rules

- 90 minutes.
- 30 minutes of extra time if necessary.
- Penalty shoot-out if scores still level.
- Maximum of two substitutions.
