= Theo Poel =

Belgian footballer

Théo Poel
Personal information
- Full name: Théophile Poel
- Date of birth: 24 April 1951 (age 75)
- Position: Central defender

Senior career*
| Years | Team | Apps | (Gls) |
| 1969-1975 | K Beringen FC | - | (-) |
| 1975-1986 | Standard Liège | 355 | (9) |
| 1986-1987 | K Beerschot VAC | - | (-) |
| Total | | 355 | (9) |
- * Club domestic league appearances and goals

Théophile Poel (born 24 April 1951) is a former Belgian footballer who played as central defender.

== Honours ==
=== Club ===
Standard Liège

- Belgian First Division: 1981–82, 1982–83
- Belgian Cup: 1980–81 (winners), 1983-84 (runners-up)
- Belgian Super Cup: 1981, 1983
- Belgian League Cup: 1975
- European Cup Winners' Cup: 1981-82 (runners-up)
- Intertoto Cup Group Winners: 1980, 1982, 1984
