= 1982 European Cup Winners' Cup final =

- Match programme cover
- Event: 1981–82 European Cup Winners' Cup
Barcelona	Standard Liège
(Spain)	(Belgium)
2	1
- Date: 12 May 1982
- Venue: Camp Nou, Barcelona
- Referee: Walter Eschweiler (West Germany)
- Attendance: 100,000

The 1982 European Cup Winners' Cup Final was a football match contested between Barcelona of Spain and Standard Liège of Belgium. It was the final match of the 1981–82 European Cup Winners' Cup and the 22nd European Cup Winners' Cup final. The final was held on 12 May 1982 at Camp Nou in Barcelona, Spain, the home ground of FC Barcelona. Barcelona won the match 2–1 thanks to goals by Allan Simonsen and Quini. The 2nd goal for Barcelona was after a free kick. Barcelona player Quini took the free kick before the referee had blown his whistle. The referee approved this goal. This led to much frustration to the players of Standard. Standard Liège centre back Walter Meeuws was sent off in the final minute after receiving his second yellow card for a foul on Lobo Carrasco due to this incident.

It was the first Cup Winners' Cup final, where the match official was accompanied by three linesmen, instead of two.

== Route to the final ==
(Spain) Barcelona					(Belgium) Standard Liège			
Opponent	Agg.	1st leg	2nd leg		Opponent	Agg.	1st leg	2nd leg
(Bulgaria) Botev Plovdiv	4–2	4–1 (H)	0–1 (A)	First round	(Malta) Floriana	12–1	3–1 (A)	9–0 (H)
(Czechoslovakia) Dukla Prague	4–1	0–1 (A)	4–0 (H)	Second round	(Hungary) Vasas	4–1	2–0 (A)	2–1 (H)
(East Germany) 1. FC Lokomotive Leipzig	4–2	3–0 (A)	1–2 (H)	Quarter-finals	(Portugal) Porto	4–2	2–0 (H)	2–2 (A)
(England) Tottenham Hotspur	2–1	1–1 (A)	1–0 (H)	Semi-finals	(Soviet Union) Dinamo Tbilisi	2–0	1–0 (A)	1–0 (H)

== Match ==
=== Details ===
12 May 1982
20:30 CEST

Barcelona (Spain)	2–1	(Belgium) Standard Liège
Simonsen 45+2'; Quini 63'	Report	Vandersmissen 8'

Camp Nou, Barcelona
Attendance: 100,000
Referee: Walter Eschweiler (West Germany)

Barcelona	Standard Liège

GK	1	(Spain) Urruti
DF	2	(Spain) Gerardo
DF	3	(Spain) Migueli	(yellow card) 25'
DF	4	(Spain) Manolo	(yellow card) 83'
MF	5	(Spain) Tente Sánchez (c)
DF	6	(Spain) José Ramón Alexanko
FW	7	(Denmark) Allan Simonsen
MF	8	(Spain) Josep Moratalla
FW	9	(Spain) Quini
MF	10	(Spain) Esteban
FW	11	(Spain) Lobo Carrasco
Substitutes:
DF	12	(Spain) Antonio Olmo
GK	13	(Spain) Pedro Artola
DF	14	(Spain) Pepito Ramos
DF	15	(Argentina) Rafael Zuviría
FW	16	(Spain) Enrique Morán
Manager:
(West Germany) Udo Lattek

GK	1	(Belgium) Michel Preud'homme
DF	2	(Belgium) Eric Gerets (c)
DF	3	(Belgium) Gerard Plessers
DF	4	(Belgium) Theo Poel
DF	5	(Belgium) Walter Meeuws	(yellow card) 31' (yellow-red card) 89'
MF	6	(Belgium) Guy Vandersmissen	(yellow card) 85'
FW	7	(Netherlands) Simon Tahamata
MF	8	(Belgium) Jos Daerden
MF	9	(Netherlands) Arie Haan	(yellow card) 71'
FW	10	(Sweden) Benny Wendt	(yellow card) 27'
MF	11	(Switzerland) René Botteron
Substitutes:
MF	12	(Belgium) Roberto Sciascia
GK	13	(Belgium) Gilbert Bodart
FW	14	(Belgium) Tony Englebert
MF	15	(Belgium) Pascal Delbrouck
FW	16	(Belgium) Eddy Voordeckers
Manager:
(Belgium) Raymond Goethals

Match rules

- 90 minutes.
- 30 minutes of extra time if necessary.
- Penalty shoot-out if scores still level.
- Five named substitutes.
- Maximum of two substitutions.

== See also ==
- 1982 European Cup Final
- 1982 UEFA Cup Final
- FC Barcelona in international football competitions
