= Pascal Delbrouck =

Belgian footballer (born 1959)

Personal information
- Date of birth: 30 March 1959 (age 67)
- Position: Midfielder

Senior career*
Years	Team	Apps	(Gls)
1980–1984	Standard de Liège		
1984–1985	Sint-Truiden		
1985–1990	RAEC Mons		
1990–1991	Eghezée S.C.		
1991–1992	ACHE		
- * Club domestic league appearances and goals

Pascal Delbrouck (born 30 March 1959) is a Belgian former professional footballer who played as a midfielder.

== Honours ==
Standard Liège

- Belgian First Division: 1981–82, 1982–83
- Belgian Cup: 1980–81
- Belgian Super Cup: 1981
- Belgian League Cup: 1975
- European Cup Winners' Cup runner-up: 1981–82
- Intertoto Cup Group Winners: 1980, 1982, 1984
