= Gerard Plessers =

Belgian footballer

Personal information
- Date of birth: 30 March 1959 (age 67)
- Place of birth: Overpelt, Belgium
- Height: 1.79 m (5 ft 10 in)
- Position: Defender

Senior career*
Years	Team	Apps	(Gls)
1975–1984	Standard Liège	191	(14)
1984–1988	Hamburger SV	85	(6)
1988–1989	Genk	28	(4)
1989–1992	Kortrijk	79	(2)
1992–1995	Overpelt Fabriek		

International career
1979–1985	Belgium	12	(1)
- * Club domestic league appearances and goals

Gerard Plessers (born 30 March 1959) is a retired Belgian footballer.

During his career he played for R. Standard de Liège, Hamburger SV, KV Kortrijk, KRC Genk and KVV Overpelt Fabriek. He earned 13 caps for the Belgium national football team, and participated in the UEFA Euro 1980 and the 1982 FIFA World Cup.

== Honours ==
=== Club ===
Standard Liège

- Belgian First Division: 1981–82, 1982–83
- Belgian Cup: 1980–81
- Belgian Super Cup: 1981
- Belgian League Cup: 1975
- European Cup Winners' Cup: 1981–82 (runners-up)
- Intertoto Cup Group Winners: 1980, 1982, 1984

=== International ===
Belgium

- UEFA European Championship: 1980 (runners-up)
- Belgian Sports Merit Award: 1980
