= Tony Englebert =

Belgian footballer (born 1961)

Personal information
- Date of birth: 18 December 1961 (age 64)
- Place of birth: Belgium
- Position: Forward

Youth career
- Standard Liège

Senior career*
Years	Team	Apps	(Gls)
1980–1983	Standard Liège		
1983–1985	K.F.C. Winterslag		
1985–1989	RFC Seraing		
- * Club domestic league appearances and goals

Tony Englebert (born 18 December 1961) is a Belgian former professional footballer who played as a forward.

== Honours ==
Standard Liège

- Belgian First Division: 1981–82, 1982–83
- Belgian Cup: 1980–81
- Belgian Super Cup: 1981
- Belgian League Cup: 1975
- European Cup Winners' Cup runner-up: 1981–82
- Intertoto Cup Group Winners: 1980, 1982
