= Raymond Goethals =

Belgian football coach (1921–2004)

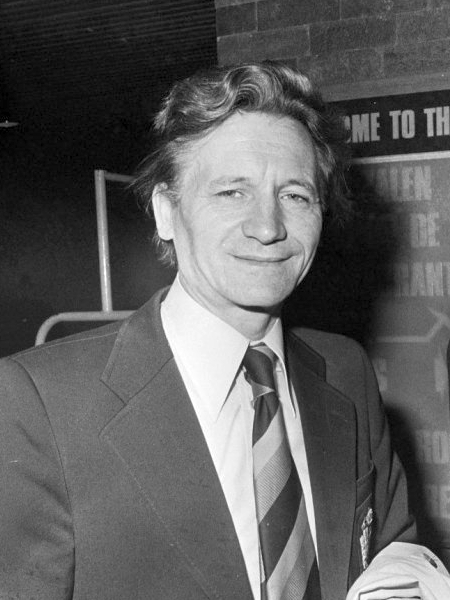
- Goethals in 1977

Personal information
- Date of birth: 7 October 1921
- Place of birth: Forest, Belgium
- Date of death: 6 December 2004 (aged 83)
- Place of death: Brussels, Belgium
- Height: 1.79 m (5 ft 10 in)
- Position: Goalkeeper

Youth career
- 1933–1939: Daring Club Bruxelles

Senior career*
Years	Team	Apps	(Gls)
1940–1947	Daring Club Bruxelles		
1947–1948	Racing Club Brussels		
1948–1952	RFC Hannutois		
1952–1957	AS Renaisiènne		

Managerial career
- 1957–1958: RFC Hannutois
- 1958–1959: Stade Waremmien
- 1959–1966: Sint-Truiden
- 1966–1968: Belgium (assistant)
- 1968–1976: Belgium
- 1976–1979: Anderlecht
- 1979–1980: Bordeaux
- 1980–1981: São Paulo (director)
- 1981–1984: Standard Liège
- 1984–1985: Vitória Guimarães
- 1985–1987: Racing Jet Brussels
- 1988–1989: Anderlecht
- 1989–1990: Bordeaux
- 1990–1993: Marseille
- 1995: Anderlecht
- * Club domestic league appearances and goals

Raymond Goethals (French: [ʁɛmɔ̃ ɡutals], Flemish: [rɛːˈmɔ̃ː ˈɣutɑls]; 7 October 1921 – 6 December 2004) was a Belgian football coach who led Marseille to victory in the UEFA Champions League final in 1993, becoming the first coach to win a European trophy with a French club.

Sometimes nicknamed "Raymond-la-science" ("Raymond-the-Science", previously the nickname of Belgian anarchist and Bonnot gang member Raymond Callemin), "le sorcier" ("the Wizard") or "le magicien" ("the Magician"), Goethals was known for his blunt way of speaking, his habit of mispronouncing players' names and his distinctive Brussels accent. A chain smoker, he was likened to TV police detective Lieutenant Columbo. He was the father of the referee Guy Goethals, who officiated at the 1992 European Championship and 1996 European Championship.

== Playing career ==
Goethals began his career as a goalkeeper in the 1930s with Daring Brussels, making his way through the youth ranks of the club before joining Racing Club Brussel in 1947. He remained at Racing Club Brussel until 1948.

== Coaching career ==
=== Early career ===
After a period spent playing for Renaisiènne, he moved into coaching with Hannutois and Waremme, and led Sint-Truiden to second place in the Belgian First Division in 1966.

=== Belgium national team ===
Goethals took charge of the Belgium national team in 1968. Belgium succeeded in qualifying for the 1970 World Cup in Mexico, although they were eliminated in the first round of the tournament.

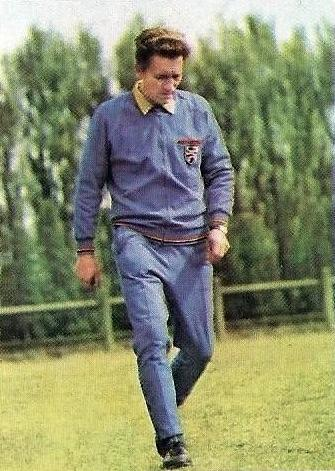
Goethals in 1972, as manager of Belgium.

Belgium hosted the 1972 European Championship, having knocked out holders Italy in the qualifying stages, and defeated Hungary in the match for third place after losing in the semi-final to eventual tournament winners Germany. That marked Goethals' greatest success as national team coach. He also took great pride in the fact that Belgium had held the emergent Netherlands scoreless in both their meetings in 1974 World Cup qualifying. Belgium completed their qualifying campaign without having conceded a single goal, but lost out to the Netherlands on account of their inferior goal difference.

=== Return to club coaching ===
In 1976 Goethals' tenure as coach of the national side ended, and he joined Anderlecht as coach. In his first season, Anderlecht reached the final of the European Cup Winners' Cup, where they lost to German side Hamburger SV, but won the trophy the following year with a comprehensive victory over FK Austria/WAC. After spells coaching in France at Bordeaux and in Brazil as football director with São Paulo, Goethals returned to Belgium to coach Standard Liège. Standard Liège were Belgian champions in 1982 and 1983, and they reached the Cup Winners' Cup Final in 1982, losing to Barcelona, who were at a considerable advantage in that the final was played at their home ground, Camp Nou.

=== Controversy and Goethals' return to Anderlecht ===
Standard Liège's 1982 championship win was to become the subject of great controversy in 1984. Seemingly preoccupied with winning his first Belgian title, Goethals had suggested and initiated the bribing of the Waterschei players prior to the teams' meeting in the final match of the season, in order to secure championship honours for Standard Liège and ensure that none of his players would miss their European final against Barcelona through injury. Goethals was forced to resign in the wake of the scandal, and he moved to Portugal to take charge of Vitória Guimarães. He then returned to Belgium to coach Racing Jet de Bruxelles before a second spell in charge of Anderlecht, where he won Belgian Cup trophy in 1989. Bordeaux again recruited Goethals, and they finished runners-up in the French championship in 1989–90 behind Marseille. Approaching 70 years of age, Goethals' greatest triumph as a coach was yet to come.

=== Marseille ===
In 1990, Goethals was named coach of Olympique de Marseille and was entrusted with the task of leading the club to European Cup success. In his first season, the club narrowly missed out on European glory, losing on penalties in the European Cup Final to Red Star Belgrade. There was recognition for Goethals' coaching abilities, as he was voted 1991 European Coach of the Year. In 1993, Marseille again reached the European Cup final, where they defeated favourites A.C. Milan with a headed goal by Basile Boli. Having achieved his primary objective at Marseille, Goethals left the club.

Marseille were later stripped of their 1993 French championship when it emerged that three Valenciennes players had been offered money to underperform in a crucial match against Marseille. The club were not allowed to defend their European title as a result, and were punished with relegation to the French second division.

== Retirement ==
Goethals' coaching career ended at Anderlecht in season 1995–96, but he remained in demand as a television analyst for his insights into football. He died on 6 December 2004 of bowel cancer aged 83. In 2005, the year following his death, he was voted 38th in De Grootste Belg, a Flemish television programme based on the BBC's 100 Greatest Britons. The number 2 stand at F.C. Brussels' home ground, Edmond Machtens Stadium, was renamed in honour of Goethals in late 2005. He remains today as the oldest winning manager of UEFA Champions League.

== Managerial statistics ==
Managerial record by team and tenure
Team	From	To	Record				
Team	From	To	P	W	D	L	Win %
Royal Stade Waremmien	1 August 1958	9 June 1959	30	15	5	10	50.0
Sint-Truiden	9 June 1959	28 May 1966	219	82	59	78	37.4
Belgium	8 June 1968	25 April 1976	44	25	8	11	56.8
Anderlecht	19 July 1976	12 July 1979	143	93	18	32	65.0
Bordeaux	22 October 1979	15 June 1980	25	13	4	8	52.0
São Paulo	29 July 1980	20 July 1981	52	31	12	9	59.6
Standard Liège	1 July 1981	11 June 1984	142	89	25	28	62.7
Vitória Guimarães	4 August 1984	8 June 1985	32	10	7	15	31.3
Racing Jet Brussels	8 June 1985	5 June 1987	67	24	21	22	35.8
Anderlecht	23 July 1987	12 June 1989	97	60	21	16	61.9
Bordeaux	4 July 1989	11 August 1990	46	25	10	11	54.3
Marseille	3 January 1991 23 October 1991	7 June 1991 29 May 1993	112	65	34	13	58.0
Anderlecht	18 March 1996	13 May 1996	7	5	1	1	71.4
Total			1,016	537	225	254	52.85

== Honours ==
=== Manager ===
Anderlecht

- European Cup Winners' Cup: 1977–78, ; runner-up 1976–77
- European Super Cup: 1976, 1978
- Belgian Cup: 1987–88, 1988–89; runner-up 1976–77
- Amsterdam Tournament: 1976
- Tournoi de Paris: 1977
- Jules Pappaert Cup: 1977
- Belgian Sports Merit Award: 1978
- Bruges Matins: 1988

Sao Paulo

- Campeonato Brasileiro Série A runner-up: 1981

Standard Liège

- Belgian First Division: 1981–82, 1982–83
- Belgian Super Cup: 1981, 1983
- European Cup Winners' Cup runner-up: 1981–82
- Intertoto Cup Group winner: 1982, 1984

Bordeaux

- French Division 1 runner-up: 1989–90

Marseille

- French Division 1: 1990–91, 1991–92
- UEFA Champions League: 1992–93; runner-up 1990–91
- Coupe de France runner-up: 1990–91

Belgium

- UEFA European Championship third place: 1972

=== Individual ===
- Panchina d'Oro: 1990–91
- Panchina d'Argento: 1991–92
- Onze d'Or Coach of the Year: 1991, 1993
- Trofee Raymond Goethals: From 2011
- Golden Shoe Lifetime Achievement Award: 2014
- France Football 47th Greatest Manager of All Time: 2019
- DH The Best Standard Liège Team Ever: 2020
