= Israeli football clubs in international competitions =

Israeli football clubs have competed in international football tournaments since 1967, when Hapoel Tel Aviv played in the inaugural Asian Champion Club Tournament. Two Israeli clubs, Hapoel Tel Aviv and Maccabi Tel Aviv, competed in all four editions of the Asian Champion Club Tournament before it was discontinued after the 1972 edition was cancelled. The Israel Football Association was expelled from the AFC in 1974, with Israeli clubs not being invited to take part in the competition when it was revived as the Asian Club Championship (now the AFC Champions League) in 1985.

Between 1976 and 1994, Israeli clubs took part in the Intertoto Cup, which was the only international club competition available until 1990 due to the Israeli FA not being affiliated to any confederation.

Israel was admitted to UEFA in 1991 and Israeli clubs participated European football tournaments since 1992, when Maccabi Tel Aviv and Hapoel Petah Tikva played in the Champions League and the Cup Winners' Cup (respectively). Since 1992, Israeli clubs have taken part in the UEFA Champions League, UEFA Cup, UEFA Cup Winners' Cup, UEFA Europa League, UEFA Conference League and UEFA Intertoto Cup.

== Full Asian record ==
Season	Club	Round	Date	Opponent	Score	Venue
1967	Hapoel Tel Aviv	Final	19 December 1967	(Malaysia) Selangor FA	2–1	Bangkok, Thailand
1969	Maccabi Tel Aviv	Group Stage	15 January 1969	(Japan) Toyo Kogyo	3–2	Bangkok, Thailand
1969	Maccabi Tel Aviv	Group Stage	19 January 1969	(Hong Kong) Kowloon Motor Bus	5–0	Bangkok, Thailand
1969	Maccabi Tel Aviv	Group Stage	22 January 1969	(Malaysia) Perak FA	1–1	Bangkok, Thailand
1969	Maccabi Tel Aviv	Group Stage	26 January 1969	(Iran) Persepolis	0–0	Bangkok, Thailand
1969	Maccabi Tel Aviv	Semi-final	28 January 1969	(India) Mysore State	6–1	Bangkok, Thailand
1969	Maccabi Tel Aviv	Final	30 January 1969	(South Korea) Yangzee FC	1–0	Bangkok, Thailand
1970	Hapoel Tel Aviv	Group Stage	2 April 1970	(Thailand) Royal Thai Police FC	5–0	Amjadieh Stadium, Tehran, Iran
1970	Hapoel Tel Aviv	Group Stage	4 April 1970	(India) West Bengal	3–1	Amjadieh Stadium, Tehran, Iran
1970	Hapoel Tel Aviv	Group Stage	6 April 1970	(Indonesia) PSMS Medan	3–1	Amjadieh Stadium, Tehran, Iran
1970	Hapoel Tel Aviv	Semi-final	8 April 1970	(Lebanon) Homenetmen	w/o	Amjadieh Stadium, Tehran, Iran
1970	Hapoel Tel Aviv	Final	10 April 1970	(Iran) Taj Tehran	1–2 (a.e.t.)	Amjadieh Stadium, Tehran, Iran
1971	Maccabi Tel Aviv	Preliminary Round	22 March 1971	(Malaysia) Perak FA	1–0	National Stadium, Bangkok, Thailand
1971	Maccabi Tel Aviv	Group Stage	25 March 1971	(Iraq) Aliyat Al-Shorta	w/o	National Stadium, Bangkok, Thailand
1971	Maccabi Tel Aviv	Group Stage	27 March 1971	(India) FC Punjab Police	4–1	National Stadium, Bangkok, Thailand
1971	Maccabi Tel Aviv	Group Stage	29 March 1971	(Thailand) Bangkok Bank FC	4–1	National Stadium, Bangkok, Thailand
1971	Maccabi Tel Aviv	Semi-final	31 March 1971	(South Korea) ROK Army	2–0	National Stadium, Bangkok, Thailand
1971	Maccabi Tel Aviv	Final	2 April 1971	(Iraq) Aliyat Al-Shorta	w/o	National Stadium, Bangkok, Thailand

=== Performance table ===
Club	APP.	P	W	D	L	GF	GA
Hapoel Tel Aviv	2	5	4	0	1	14	5
Maccabi Tel Aviv	2	10	8	2	0	27	6
Total	4	15	12	2	1	41	11

== Intertoto Cup (1976–1994) ==
Israeli teams first appeared in the Intertoto Cup in 1976, with Hapoel Be'er Sheva and Beitar Jerusalem, champions and runners-up in the previous season, debuting. In 1979, due to the cost of travelling to Europe, only one team, Maccabi Netanya was entered into the competition, and between 1980 and 1992 the two Israeli entrants played in one group to reduce travelling expenses. In 1993 and 1994, as the format of the competition was changed to allow participating teams to play only two away matches, Israeli teams were allocated to two different groups.

Season	Club	Group	Rank	Opponents	W	D	L	GF	GA
1976	Beitar Jerusalem	1	3rd	(Switzerland) Young Boys, (Sweden) Malmö FF, (Austria) Admira Vienna	2	2	2	12	13
1976	Hapoel Be'er Sheva	2	3rd	(West Germany) Hertha Berlin, (Belgium) Standard Liège, (Denmark) Køge	1	3	2	8	13
1977	Maccabi Jaffa	1	4th	(Sweden) Halmstad, (Socialist Federal Republic of Yugoslavia) Vojvodina, (Netherlands) Amsterdam	2	1	3	9	15
1977	Maccabi Tel Aviv	2	4th	(West Germany) Duisburg, (Belgium) Standard Liège, (Netherlands) Twente	1	1	4	10	15
1978	Maccabi Tel Aviv	5	3rd	(Sweden) Malmö FF, (Switzerland) FC Zürich, (Austria) Admira Vienna	2	0	4	10	10
1978	Maccabi Netanya	8	1st	(Socialist Federal Republic of Yugoslavia) Sloboda Tuzla, (Sweden) Elfsborg, (Norway) Lillestrøm	3	3	0	16	8
1979	Maccabi Netanya	1	3rd	(West Germany) Werder Bremen, (Belgium) Standard Liège, (Austria) Rapid Vienna	1	2	3	8	10
1980	Maccabi Netanya	3	1st	(Denmark) KB, (Belgium) Royal Antwerp	3	2	1	11	6
1980	Maccabi Tel Aviv	3	4th	(Denmark) KB, (Belgium) Royal Antwerp	1	1	4	8	14
1981	Maccabi Netanya	1	3rd	(Austria) Wiener SK, (Belgium) R.F.C. de Liège	2	2	2	11	8
1981	Hapoel Tel Aviv	1	4th	(Austria) Wiener SK, (Belgium) R.F.C. de Liège	0	2	4	6	16
1982	Hapoel Tel Aviv	5	2nd	(Austria) Admira Vienna, (Sweden) Norrköping	4	0	2	12	10
1982	Hapoel Kfar Saba	5	4th	(Austria) Admira Vienna, (Sweden) Norrköping	1	1	4	8	18
1983	Maccabi Netanya	4	1st	(Denmark) AGF, (Switzerland) FC Lucerne	5	0	1	17	10
1983	Shimshon Tel Aviv	4	4th	(Denmark) AGF, (Switzerland) FC Lucerne	1	1	4	5	10
1984	Maccabi Netanya	8	1st	(Austria) Admira Vienna, (Switzerland) FC Wettingen	4	1	1	13	13
1984	Beitar Jerusalem	8	4th	(Austria) Admira Vienna, (Switzerland) FC Wettingen	0	1	5	6	14
1985	Maccabi Haifa	8	1st	(West Germany) Arminia Bielefeld, (Austria) Sturm Graz	4	1	1	13	12
1985	Beitar Jerusalem	8	4th	(West Germany) Arminia Bielefeld, (Austria) Sturm Graz	1	1	4	5	12
1986	Maccabi Haifa	8	2nd	(Denmark) Lyngby, (Austria) Grazer AK	2	2	2	7	10
1986	Hapoel Tel Aviv	8	3rd	(Denmark) Lyngby, (Austria) Grazer AK	1	2	3	9	12
1987	Beitar Jerusalem	8	3rd	(Denmark) Brøndby, (West Germany) VfL Bochum	2	1	3	3	11
1987	Bnei Yehuda	8	4th	(Denmark) Brøndby, (West Germany) VfL Bochum	0	1	5	4	16
1988	Beitar Jerusalem	7	3rd	(Denmark) Ikast FS, (Austria) Sturm Graz	1	2	3	8	16
1988	Shimshon Tel Aviv	7	4th	(Denmark) Ikast FS, (Austria) Sturm Graz	0	2	4	3	16
1989	Hapoel Petah Tikva	8	3rd	(Czechoslovakia) Sparta Prague, (Poland) Wisła Kraków	2	1	3	9	11
1989	Beitar Jerusalem	8	4th	(Czechoslovakia) Sparta Prague, (Poland) Wisła Kraków	1	1	4	7	13
1990	Maccabi Haifa	3	2nd	(Poland) Lech Poznań, (Hungary) BFC Siófok	3	2	1	14	5
1990	Bnei Yehuda	3	4th	(Poland) Lech Poznań, (Hungary) BFC Siófok	0	1	5	5	18
1991	Maccabi Haifa	10	3rd	(Sweden) Örebro, (Germany) Saarbrücken	2	0	4	6	17
1991	Hapoel Petah Tikva	10	4th	(Sweden) Örebro, (Germany) Saarbrücken	0	1	5	8	17
1992	Maccabi Petah Tikva	9	3rd	(Czech Republic) Slavia Prague, (Germany) Bayer Leverkusen	1	3	2	7	11
1992	Maccabi Netanya	9	4th	(Czech Republic) Slavia Prague, (Germany) Bayer Leverkusen	0	2	4	4	13
1993	Maccabi Tel Aviv	5	5th	(Czech Republic) Slavia Prague, (Germany) Lokomotive Leipzieg, (Denmark) AaB, (Sweden) Häcken	0	1	3	2	9
1993	Beitar Jerusalem	8	5th	(Germany) Dynamo Dresden, (Switzerland) FC Aarau, (Austria) Wiener SK, (Greece) Iraklis	0	2	2	3	6
1994	Maccabi Netanya	1	3rd	(Sweden) Halmstad, (Bulgaria) Lokomotiv Sofia, (Czech Republic) Sparta Prague, (Denmark) Silkeborg	1	2	1	5	5
1994	Hapoel Be'er Sheva	2	2nd	(Switzerland) Young Boys, (Romania) Electroputere Craiova, (Germany) Karlsruhe, (Sweden) Häcken	2	1	1	9	5

=== Performance table ===
Club	APP.	P	W	D	L	GF	GA
Maccabi Netanya	8	46	19	14	13	85	74
Beitar Jerusalem	7	40	7	10	23	44	85
Maccabi Haifa	4	24	11	5	8	40	44
Maccabi Tel Aviv	4	22	4	3	15	30	48
Hapoel Tel Aviv	3	18	5	4	9	27	38
Hapoel Be'er Sheva	2	10	3	4	3	17	18
Hapoel Petah Tikva	2	12	2	2	8	17	28
Shimshon Tel Aviv	2	12	1	3	8	8	26
Bnei Yehuda	2	12	0	2	10	9	34
Maccabi Jaffa	1	6	2	1	3	9	15
Hapoel Kfar Saba	1	6	1	1	4	8	18
Maccabi Petah Tikva	1	6	1	3	2	7	11
Total	37	214	56	52	106	301	439

== Full European record ==
Israeli clubs have participated in UEFA tournaments since 1992–93. Maccabi Haifa three times, Maccabi Tel Aviv twice and Hapoel Tel Aviv had managed to qualify to the Champions League group stage. The same clubs, along with Maccabi Petah Tikva and Ironi Kiryat Shmona qualified to the UEFA Cup/Europa League group stage. The furthest any club reached in a European tournament was the quarter-finals, reached by Maccabi Haifa in 1998–99 and by Hapoel Tel Aviv in 2001–02.

=== Performance table ===
Club	UEFA Champions League							UEFA Europa League (includes UEFA Cup)							UEFA Europa Conference League							UEFA Cup Winners' Cup							UEFA Intertoto Cup							Total						
Club	Apps.	Pld	W	D	L	GF	GA	Apps.	Pld	W	D	L	GF	GA	Apps.	Pld	W	D	L	GF	GA	Apps.	Pld	W	D	L	GF	GA	Apps.	Pld	W	D	L	GF	GA	Apps.	Pld	W	D	L	GF	GA
Mac. Tel Aviv	10	47	15	10	16	47	63	14	94	42	20	32	134	130	2	20	10	6	4	30	18	1	4	2	1	1	6	4	0	0	0	0	0	0	0	24	165	69	37	53	217	215
Mac. Haifa	10*	47	19	9	19	85	70	12	55	22	14	19	86	72	1	12	5	3	5	23	13	3	18	9	2	7	29	22	3	8	3	0	5	13	24	22	140	58	28	55	236	201
Hap. Tel Aviv	2	14	5	3	6	21	20	14	92	43	17	32	135	101	0	0	0	0	0	0	0	0	0	0	0	0	0	0	1	4	0	0	4	1	10	17	110	48	20	42	157	131
Beitar Jerusalem	5	16	6	3	7	20	29	10	33	10	10	13	46	55	0	0	0	0	0	0	0	0	0	0	0	0	0	0	2	8	2	1	5	12	20	14	57	18	14	25	78	104
Hap. Be'er Sheva	3	16	9	3	4	27	24	9	44	14	9	21	49	72	2*	13	7	4	2	22	9	1	4	1	1	2	3	15	1	2	1	0	1	2	4	11	79	32	17	30	103	124
Bnei Yehuda	0	0	0	0	0	0	0	7	30	15	4	11	30	29	0	0	0	0	0	0	0	0	0	0	0	0	0	0	0	0	0	0	0	0	0	7	30	15	4	11	30	29
Mac. Netanya	0	0	0	0	0	0	0	4	10	2	3	5	7	16	1	2	0	1	1	1	2	0	0	0	0	0	0	0	1	2	1	0	1	3	3	6	14	3	4	7	11	22
Mac. Petah Tikva	0	0	0	0	0	0	0	2	11	4	0	7	21	21	0	0	0	0	0	0	0	0	0	0	0	0	0	0	3	14	4	6	4	16	20	5	25	8	6	11	37	41
Hap. Haifa	1	4	0	2	2	1	5	2	8	3	1	4	9	15	0	0	0	0	0	0	0	0	0	0	0	0	0	0	3	10	2	2	6	14	20	5	22	5	5	12	24	40
Ir. Kiryat Shmona	1	6	2	2	2	9	6	4	14	1	5	8	14	24	0	0	0	0	0	0	0	0	0	0	0	0	0	0	0	0	0	0	0	0	0	4	20	3	7	10	23	30
Hap. Petah Tikva	0	0	0	0	0	0	0	1	6	3	2	1	5	3	0	0	0	0	0	0	0	1	4	3	0	1	6	2	2	6	0	3	3	11	4	4	16	6	5	5	13	16
FC Ashdod	0	0	0	0	0	0	0	1	2	0	2	0	3	3	1	2	0	1	1	0	1	0	0	0	0	0	0	0	1	4	2	1	1	7	3	3	8	2	4	2	10	7
Bnei Sakhnin	0	0	0	0	0	0	0	1	4	2	0	2	7	8	0	0	0	0	0	0	0	0	0	0	0	0	0	0	1	4	2	0	2	4	4	2	8	4	0	4	11	12
Hap. Ramat Gan	0	0	0	0	0	0	0	1	2	0	1	1	0	1	0	0	0	0	0	0	0	0	0	0	0	0	0	0	0	0	0	0	0	0	0	1	2	0	1	1	0	1
Hap. Rishon LeZion	0	0	0	0	0	0	0	0	0	0	0	0	0	0	0	0	0	0	0	0	0	1	2	1	0	1	3	3	0	0	0	0	0	0	0	1	2	1	0	1	3	3

^{Update: 8 September 2022, * currently in indicated competition.}

== Statistics ==
- Most Champions League competitions appeared in: 3 – Maccabi Haifa (2002–03, 2009–10, 2022–23)
  - Best performances: Maccabi Haifa (3rd place at Group stage – 2002–03)
- Most UEFA Cup/Europa League competitions appeared in: 10 – Hapoel Tel Aviv (1999–2000, 2001–02, 2002–03, 2003–04, 2006–07, 2007–08, 2008–09, 2009–10, 2011–12, 2012–13)
  - Best performances: Hapoel Tel Aviv (Quarter-finals – 2001–02)
- Most Conference League competitions appeared in: 2 – Maccabi Haifa (2021–22, 2023–24) and Maccabi Tel Aviv (2021–22, 2023–24)
  - Best performances: Maccabi Haifa and Maccabi Tel Aviv (Round of 16 – 2023–24)
- Most Cup Winners' Cup competitions appeared in: 3 – Maccabi Haifa (1993–94, 1995–96, 1998–99)
  - Best performances: Maccabi Haifa (Quarter-finals – 1998–99)
- Most Intertoto Cup competitions appeared in: 9 – Maccabi Netanya (1978, 1979, 1980, 1981, 1983, 1984, 1992, 1994, 2003)
  - Best performances: Maccabi Netanya (1st at Group stage – 1978, 1980, 1983, 1984)
- Most matches played: 201 – Maccabi Tel Aviv
- First match played: Valletta 1–2 Maccabi Tel Aviv, 19 August 1992 (1992–93 Champions League, preliminary round)
- Most match wins: 69 – Maccabi Tel Aviv
- Most match losses: 63 – Maccabi Haifa
- Biggest win: Khazar Lankaran 0–8 Maccabi Haifa (2013–14 Europa League Second qualifying round)
- Biggest defeat: Roda 10–0 Hapoel Be'er Sheva (1997–98 Cup Winners' Cup first round)

Notes:

- The total appearances column sum all club appearances by seasons and not by competitions (i.e. for a club which played in CL and EL in one season, only one appearance is calculated in the total column, while one appearance is calculated for each competition).
- Maccabi Haifa had beaten FC Haka 4–0 in 2001–02, which was later awarded to HJK as a walkover win due to Maccabi Haifa fielding a suspended player. The original score is included in the table.
- Maccabi Tel Aviv had beaten PAOK 2–1 in 2004–05, which was later awarded to Maccabi Tel Aviv as a walkover win due to PAOK fielding a suspended player. The original score is included in the table.
- In 2013–14 UEFA Europa League Maccabi Tel Aviv were drawn to meet PAOK in the Play-off round. However, on 14 August 2013, Metalist Kharkiv were disqualified from the 2013–14 UEFA club competitions because of previous match-fixing. UEFA decided to replace Metalist Kharkiv in the Champions League play-off round with PAOK, who were eliminated by Metalist Kharkiv in the third qualifying round. Thus, Maccabi Tel Aviv, the opponent of PAOK in the Europa League play-off round, qualified directly for the Europa League group stage without playing any match in the play-off round. The two cancelled matches are not included in the table.
