= Roberto Sciascia =

Belgian footballer

Personal information
- Date of birth: 23 February 1960 (age 66)
- Place of birth: Italy
- Position: Midfielder

Senior career*
Years	Team	Apps	(Gls)
1981-1983	Standard Liège	30	(0)
1983-1985	K. Beerschot V.A.C.	24	(0)
1985-1986	Associação Académica de Coimbra – O.A.F.	27	(1)
1986-1987	Udinese Calcio	0	(0)
1987-1988	A.S.D. Vittorio Falmec San Martino Colle		
1988-1989	A.C.D. Treviso	10	(0)
- * Club domestic league appearances and goals

Roberto Sciascia (born 23 February 1960 in Italy) is a Belgian retired footballer.

== Career ==
In 1986, Sciascia signed for Udinese Calcio in the Italian top flight. However, despite being eligible to qualify as an Italian through his parents, he had to register as a foreign player. While waiting for over a year to get registration, Sciascia played a few friendlies with the club but eventually left for Associazione Sportiva Dilettantistica Vittorio Falmec San Martino Colle in the Italian amateur leagues.

== Honours ==
=== Club ===
Standard Liège

- Belgian First Division: 1981–82, 1982–83
- Belgian Super Cup: 1981
- European Cup Winners' Cup: 1981-82 (runners-up)
- Intertoto Cup Group Winners: 1982
