= Simon Tahamata =

Dutch footballer (born 1956)

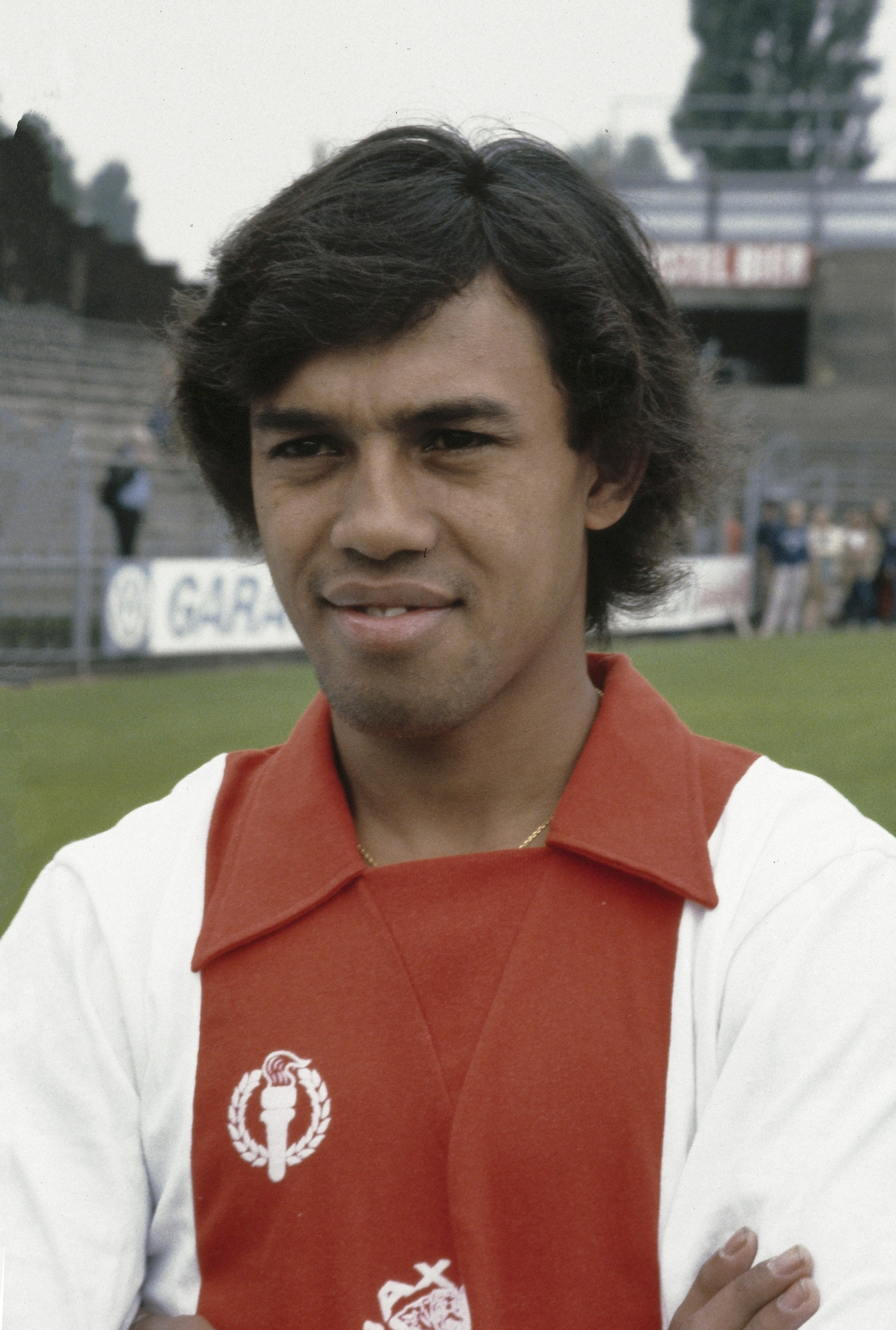
- Tahamata in 1979

Personal information
- Full name: Simon Melkianus Tahamata
- Date of birth: 26 May 1956 (age 70)
- Place of birth: Vught, Netherlands
- Height: 1.65 m (5 ft 5 in)
- Position: Left winger

Team information
- Current team: Indonesia (head of scouting); Indonesia U17 (assistant coach)

Youth career
- 1967–1971: Theole
- 1971–1976: Ajax

Senior career*
Years	Team	Apps	(Gls)
1976–1980	Ajax	109	(14)
1980–1984	Standard Liège	129	(40)
1984–1987	Feyenoord	87	(29)
1987–1990	Beerschot	99	(12)
1990–1996	Germinal Ekeren	180	(19)
Total		604	(114)

International career
1979–1986	Netherlands	22	(2)
- * Club domestic league appearances and goals

Simon Melkianus Tahamata (born 26 May 1956) is a Dutch professional football coach and former player who is currently the head of scouting of the Indonesia national team and assistant coach of the Indonesia national under-17 team.

Throughout his career, Tahamata played for multiple Dutch and Belgian clubs. He also played 22 times for the Netherlands national team, scoring twice. He naturalized to a Belgian citizen in 1989.

== International career ==
Tahamata made his debut for the Netherlands national team on 22 May 1979 in Bern, Switzerland in the 75th Anniversary Match of the FIFA against Argentina.

== Coaching career ==
After his career as a player Tahamata went on to work as a youth coach for Standard Liège, Germinal Beerschot and Ajax. From 2009 he worked for a period as a technical coach for the youth teams of under-10 until under-15 of the Saudi Arabian club Al-Ahli. In October 2014, Tahamata returned to Ajax.

Since September 2015, next to his duties at Ajax, he also has a youth academy, the Simon Tahamata Soccer Academy.

On 22 May 2025, Tahamata was hired as the head of scouting of the Indonesian national team.

== Career statistics ==
=== International ===
Appearances and goals by national team and year
National team	Year	Apps	Goals
Netherlands	1979	5	0
Netherlands	1980	3	1
Netherlands	1981	2	0
Netherlands	1982	3	1
Netherlands	1983	0	0
Netherlands	1984	0	0
Netherlands	1985	6	0
Netherlands	1986	3	0
Total		22	2

Scores and results list the Netherlands' goal tally first, score column indicates score after each Tahamata goal.

List of international goals scored by Simon Tahamata
No.	Date	Venue	Opponent	Score	Result	Competition
1	10 September 1980	Dublin, Ireland	Republic of Ireland	1–0	1–2	1982 FIFA World Cup qualification
2	10 November 1982	Rotterdam, Netherlands	France	1–0	1–2	Friendly

== Honours ==
Ajax

- Eredivisie: 1976–77, 1978–79, 1979–80
- KNVB Cup: 1978–79

Standard Liège

- Belgian First Division: 1981–82, 1982–83
- Belgian Cup: 1980–81; runner-up 1983–84
- Belgian Super Cup: 1981, 1983
- European Cup Winners' Cup runner-up: 1981–82
- Intertoto Cup Group Winners: 1980, 1982

Beerschot

- Belgian Cup runner-up: 1994–95

Individual

- Man of the Season (Belgian First Division): 1990–91
- Belgian Fair Play Award: 1993–94, 1994–95
- DH The Best Standard Liège Team Ever: 2020
