= Jos Daerden =

Belgian football manager and former player

Personal information
- Full name: Jozef Daerden
- Date of birth: 26 November 1954 (age 71)
- Place of birth: Tongeren, Belgium
- Position: Midfielder

Team information
- Current team: K.R.C. Genk (assistant manager)

Youth career
- Herderen
- Standard de Liège
- K.S.K. Tongeren

Senior career*
Years	Team	Apps	(Gls)
1971–1980	K.S.K. Tongeren	215	(36)
1980–1984	Standard de Liège	150	(31)
1984–1986	Roda JC	50	(9)
1986–1990	K. Beerschot V.A.C.	131	(11)
1990–1991	Germinal Ekeren	42	(1)
Total		588	(88)

International career
1982–1984	Belgium	5	(0)

Managerial career
- 1992–1995: K.S.K. Beveren
- 1995–1996: Lommel S.K.
- 1996–1997: Standard de Liège
- 1997–1998: Lierse S.K.
- 1999: Lommel S.K.
- 2000–2001: FC Eindhoven
- 2001–2004: K.R.C. Genk (assistant)
- 2004–2005: R.A.E.C. Mons
- 2005: K.R.C. Genk (assistant)
- 2005–2006: Germinal Beerschot
- 2006–2007: FC Metalurh Donetsk (assistant)
- 2007: FC Metalurh Donetsk
- 2009–2010: Germinal Beerschot
- 2010–2011: FC Twente (assistant)
- 2011: S. du Pays de Charleroi
- 2012–2013: Újpest FC
- 2014–2016: FC Krylia Sovetov Samara (assistant)
- 2017–: K.R.C. Genk (assistant)
- * Club domestic league appearances and goals

Jozef "Jos" Daerden (Dutch pronunciation: [ˈjoːzəf jɔz ˈdaːrdə(n)]; born 26 November 1954) is a Belgian football manager and a former player. He works as an assistant manager of K.R.C. Genk.

== Club career ==
Daerden formerly played with K.S.K. Tongeren, Standard de Liège, Roda JC, K. Beerschot V.A.C. and Germinal Ekeren.

== International career ==
Daerden played 5 times with the Belgium national team between 1982 and 1984.

== Coaching career ==
He coached K.S.K. Beveren, Lommel S.K., Standard de Liège, Lierse S.K., K.R.C. Genk, R.A.E.C. Mons, Germinal Beerschot and FC Metalurh Donetsk. On 3 September 2009 Germinal Beerschot have hired Daerden to replace Aimé Anthuenis until the end of the season. In June 2010 Daerden moved to Dutch champion FC Twente to become the assistant coach to Michel Preud'homme. On 28 June 2011, he signed a one-year deal to become the head coach of newly relegated club S. du Pays de Charleroi

== Personal life ==
His son is former footballer Koen Daerden.

== Honours ==
=== Player ===
Standard Liège

- Belgian First Division: 1981–82, 1982–83
- Belgian Cup: 1980–81 (winners), 1983-84 (runners-up)
- Belgian Super Cup: 1981, 1983
- European Cup Winners' Cup: 1981-82 (runners-up)
- Intertoto Cup Group Winners: 1980, 1982

=== Manager ===
==== Lierse SK ====
- Belgian Super Cup: 1997
