= Guy Vandersmissen =

Belgian footballer

Personal information
- Full name: Guy Vandersmissen
- Date of birth: 25 December 1957 (age 68)
- Place of birth: Tongeren, Belgium
- Height: 1.78 m (5 ft 10 in)
- Position: Midfielder

Youth career
- 1972–1978: Standard Liège

Senior career*
Years	Team	Apps	(Gls)
1977–1978	→ Stade Waremmien (loan)		
1977–1991	Standard Liège	370	(69)
1991–1992	Germinal Ekeren	35	(3)
1992–1998	R.W.D. Molenbeek	171	(5)
Total		576	(77)

International career
1982–1987	Belgium	17	(0)

Managerial career
- 1998: R.W.D. Molenbeek
- * Club domestic league appearances and goals

Guy Vandersmissen (born 25 December 1957) is a retired Belgian footballer.

During his career he played for R. Standard de Liège, K.F.C. Germinal Ekeren, and R.W.D. Molenbeek. He earned 17 caps for the Belgium national football team, and participated in the 1982 FIFA World Cup.

== Honours ==
=== Club ===
Standard Liège

- Belgian First Division: 1981–82, 1982–83
- Belgian Cup: 1980–81 (winners), 1987–88, 1988–89 (runners-up)
- Belgian Super Cup: 1981, 1983
- European Cup Winners' Cup: 1981–82 (runners-up)
- Intertoto Cup Group Winners: 1980, 1982
