= Walter Meeuws =

Belgian football manager and former player

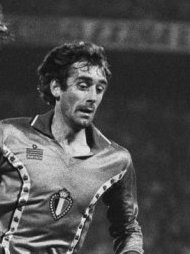
- Meeuws in action for Belgium in 1981

Personal information
- Full name: Walter Meeuws
- Date of birth: 11 July 1951 (age 75)
- Place of birth: Gierle, Belgium
- Height: 1.85 m (6 ft 1 in)
- Position: Defender

Senior career*
Years	Team	Apps	(Gls)
1970–1972	K.R.C. Mechelen	54	(22)
1972–1978	Beerschot	154	(25)
1978–1981	Club Brugge	90	(16)
1981–1984	Standard de Liège	88	(6)
1984–1985	Ajax	11	(0)
1985–1987	KV Mechelen	30	(2)
Total		427	(71)

International career
1977–1984	Belgium	46	(0)

Managerial career
- 1987–1988: Lierse
- 1989–1990: Belgium
- 1990–1991: Sint-Truiden
- 1991–1993: Antwerp
- 1993–1994: Gent
- 1995–1997: Lommel S.K.
- 1998–2001: Lierse
- 2001: Gençlerbirliği
- 2001–2003: Raja Casablanca
- 2004: Al-Ittihad
- 2005–2006: Al Jazira
- 2007–2008: Beveren
- 2007–2009: FAR Rabat
- 2010–2012: Wadi Degla
- 2016: Lommel United
- * Club domestic league appearances and goals

Walter Meeuws (born 11 July 1951) is a Belgian former football player and manager.

== Playing career ==
During his career Meeuws played for K. Beerschot V.A.C., Club Brugge, Standard Liège, Ajax, K.V. Mechelen. He earned 46 caps for the Belgium national team, and participated in UEFA Euro 1980 and the 1982 FIFA World Cup.

After retiring from playing, he has been working as a manager, including a stint as the national team manager from 1989 to 1990.

As a player, he won four championships, two with Standard in Belgium, one with Bruges in Belgium and one with Ajax in the Netherlands. He also won two cups and played the final of the European Championship with Belgium in Italy in 1980. He is considered one of the best Belgian defenders ever.

== Managerial career ==
As a manager, Meeuws won three cups with Lierse S.K., FC Antwerp and FAR Rabat (2009), one Supercup with Lierse, and was runner-up in the African Champions League Final with Raja Casablanca and also runner-up with Antwerp in the final of the European Cup-Winners Cup in 1993 at Wembley. He is the last manager ever that reached a European Final with a Belgian Team.

== Honours ==
=== Player ===
Club Brugge

- Belgian First Division: 1979–80
- Belgian Supercup: 1980
- Japan Cup Kirin World Soccer: 1981
- Jules Pappaert Cup: 1978

Standard de Liège

- Belgian First Division: 1981–82, 1982–83
- Belgian Supercup: 1981, 1983
- European Cup Winners' Cup runner-up: 1981–82
- Intertoto Cup Group: 1982

Ajax Amsterdam

- Eredivisie: 1984–85

KV Mechelen

- Belgian Cup: 1986–87

Belgium

- UEFA European Championship runner-up: 1980
- Belgian Sports Merit Award: 1980

=== Manager ===
Royal Antwerp

- Belgian Cup: 1991–92
- European Cup Winners' Cup runner-up: 1992–93

Lierse

- Belgian Cup: 1998–99
- Belgian Super Cup: 1999

Raja de Casablanca

- CAF Champions League runner-up: 2002

FAR Rabat

- Moroccan Throne Cup: 2009

=== Individual ===
- Belgian Professional Manager of the Year: 1992–93
