= Eddy Voordeckers =

Belgian footballer

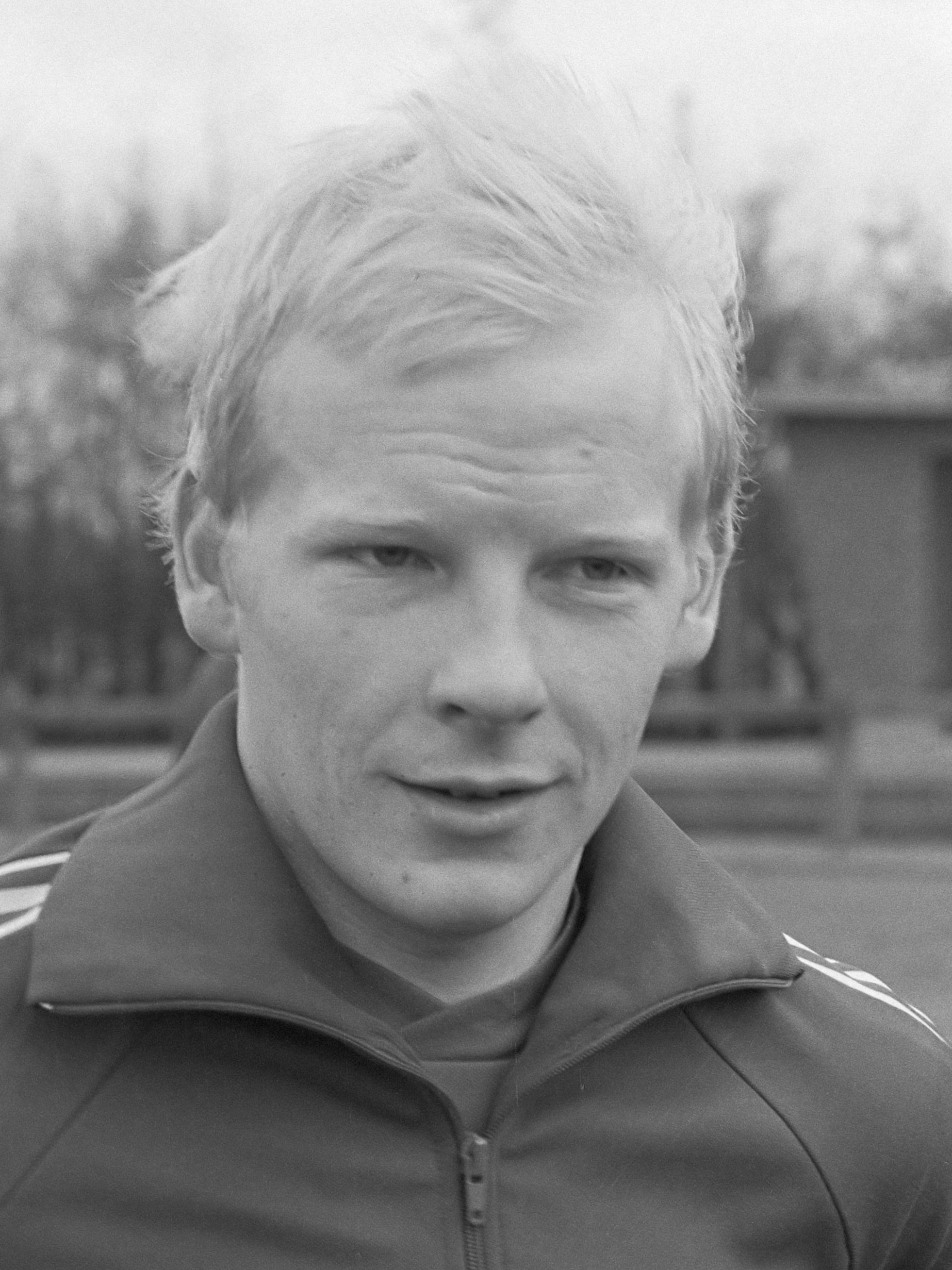
- Voordeckers in 1980

Personal information
- Date of birth: 4 February 1960 (age 66)
- Place of birth: Geel, Belgium
- Height: 1.69 m (5 ft 7 in)
- Position: Forward

Senior career*
Years	Team	Apps	(Gls)
1976–1979	Diest		
1979–1982	Standard de Liège		
1982–1985	Waterschei		
1985–1987	Rennes		
1987–1990	Gent		
1990–1992	Westerlo		

International career
1978–1985	Belgium	22	(4)
- * Club domestic league appearances and goals

Eddy Voordeckers (born 4 February 1960) is a Belgian former professional footballer who played as forward.

== Honours ==
Standard Liège

- Belgian First Division: 1981–82
- Belgian Cup: 1980–81
- Belgian Super Cup: 1981
- European Cup Winners' Cup: runner-up 1981–82
- Intertoto Cup Group Winners: 1980, 1982

Gent

- Second Division play-off winner: 1988–89

Individual

- European Cup Winners Cup top scorer: 1981–82 (six goals)
