= PFC Cherno More Varna in European football =

European record of a Bulgarian football club

The Bulgarian football club PFC Cherno More Varna has played several times in two international competitions at the European level: the Intertoto Cup and the Europa League (formerly the UEFA Cup).

== Total statistics ==
Competition	S	P	W	D	L	GF	GA	GD
Intertoto Cup / UEFA Intertoto Cup	2	10	4	2	4	14	10	+ 4
UEFA Cup / UEFA Europa League	3	12	5	3	4	20	12	+ 8
UEFA Conference League	1	2	0	1	1	1	2	– 1
Total	6	24	9	6	9	35	24	+ 11

== Statistics by country ==
Country	Club	P	W	D	L	GF	GA	GD
Andorra	UE Sant Julià	2	2	0	0	9	0	+ 9
Subtotal		2	2	0	0	9	0	+ 9
Belarus	FC Dinamo Minsk	2	0	1	1	1	5	− 4
Subtotal		2	0	1	1	1	5	− 4
Belgium	Standard Liège	2	1	0	1	3	3	± 0
Subtotal		2	1	0	1	3	3	± 0
Denmark	Hvidovre IF	2	1	1	0	3	1	+ 2
Subtotal		2	1	1	0	3	1	+ 2
Germany / West Germany	Bayer Leverkusen	2	0	1	1	1	4	− 3
Germany / West Germany	VfB Stuttgart	2	0	1	1	3	4	− 1
Subtotal		4	0	2	2	4	8	− 4
Israel	Hapoel Be'er Sheva	2	0	1	1	1	2	– 1
Israel	Maccabi Netanya	2	1	1	0	3	1	+ 2
Subtotal		4	1	2	1	4	3	+ 1
Italy	Sampdoria	2	0	0	2	0	2	− 2
Subtotal		2	0	0	2	0	2	− 2
Moldova	FC Iskra-Stal Rîbnița	2	2	0	0	4	0	+ 4
Subtotal		2	2	0	0	4	0	+ 4
Netherlands	PSV Eindhoven	2	0	0	2	0	2	− 2
Subtotal		2	0	0	2	0	2	− 2
North Macedonia	Makedonija GP	2	2	0	0	7	0	+ 7
Subtotal		2	2	0	0	7	0	+ 7
Total		24	9	6	9	35	24	+ 11

== Statistics by competition ==
=== UEFA Intertoto Cup ===
Season	Competition	Round	Club	Home	Away	Aggregate
1982	Intertoto Cup					
1982	Intertoto Cup	Group Stage	(Belgium) Standard Liège	2–0	1–3	3rd
1982	Intertoto Cup	Group Stage	(West Germany) Bayer Leverkusen	1–1	0–3	3rd
1982	Intertoto Cup	Group Stage	(Denmark) Hvidovre IF	2–0	1–1	3rd
2007	UEFA Intertoto Cup	2Q	(North Macedonia) Makedonija	4−0	3−0	7−0
2007	UEFA Intertoto Cup	3Q	(Italy) Sampdoria	0−1	0−1	0−2

=== UEFA Cup / UEFA Europa League ===
Season	Competition	Round	Club	Home	Away	Aggregate
2008–09	UEFA Cup	1Q	(Andorra) Sant Julià	4−0	5−0	9−0
2008–09	UEFA Cup	2Q	(Israel) Maccabi Netanya	2−0	1−1	3−1
2008–09	UEFA Cup	PO	(Germany) Stuttgart	1−2	2−2	3−4
2009–10	UEFA Europa League	2Q	(Moldova) Iskra-Stal	1−0	3−0	4−0
2009–10	UEFA Europa League	3Q	(Netherlands) PSV Eindhoven	0−1	0−1	0−2
2015–16	UEFA Europa League	2Q	(Belarus) Dinamo Minsk	1−1	0−4	1−5

=== UEFA Conference League ===
Season	Competition	Round	Club	Home	Away	Aggregate
2024–25	UEFA Conference League	2Q	(Israel) Hapoel Be'er Sheva	1−2	0−0	1−2
2025–26	UEFA Conference League	2Q	(Turkey) İstanbul Başakşehir	−	−	−

Notes

- 2Q: Second qualifying round
- 3Q: Third qualifying round
- PO: Play-off round
