= La DH Les Sports+ =

French-language Belgian daily newspaper

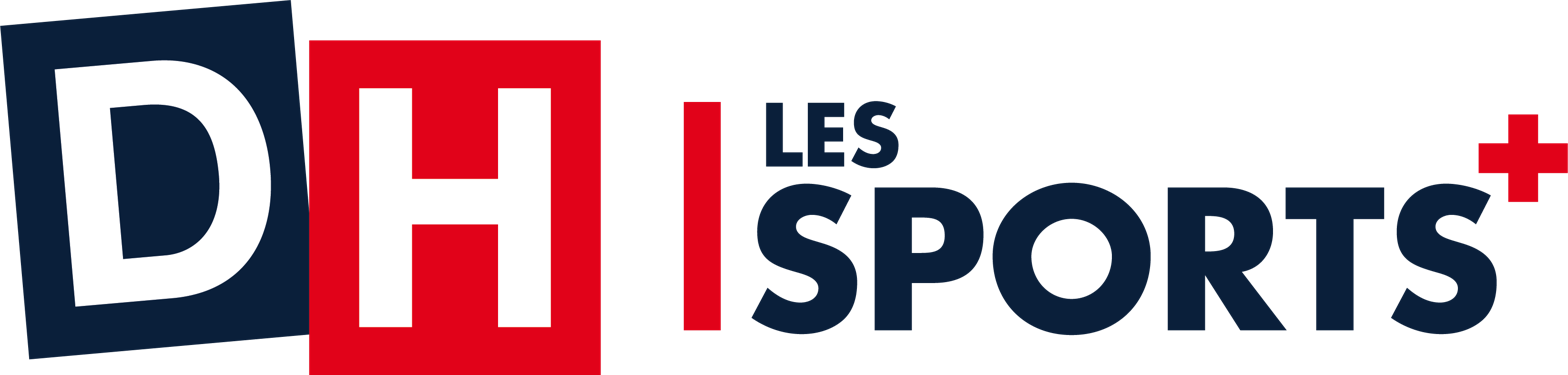
- Type: Daily newspaper
- Publisher: IPM Publishing Group
- Editor: Michel Marteau
- Founded: 19 April 1906; 120 years ago
- Political alignment: Liberal
- Language: French
- Headquarters: Rue des Francs / Frankenstraat 79, 1040 Etterbeek, Brussels-Capital Region, Belgium
- ISSN: 1780-0412
- Website: www.dhnet.be

La DH Les Sports+, formerly known as La Dernière Heure/Les Sports (French pronunciation: [la dɛʁnjɛʁ œʁ], lit. 'The Latest Hour', (French pronunciation: [le spɔʁ], lit. 'The Sports')), is a French-language daily newspaper published in Brussels, Belgium. The paper is known for news and sports.

== History and profile ==
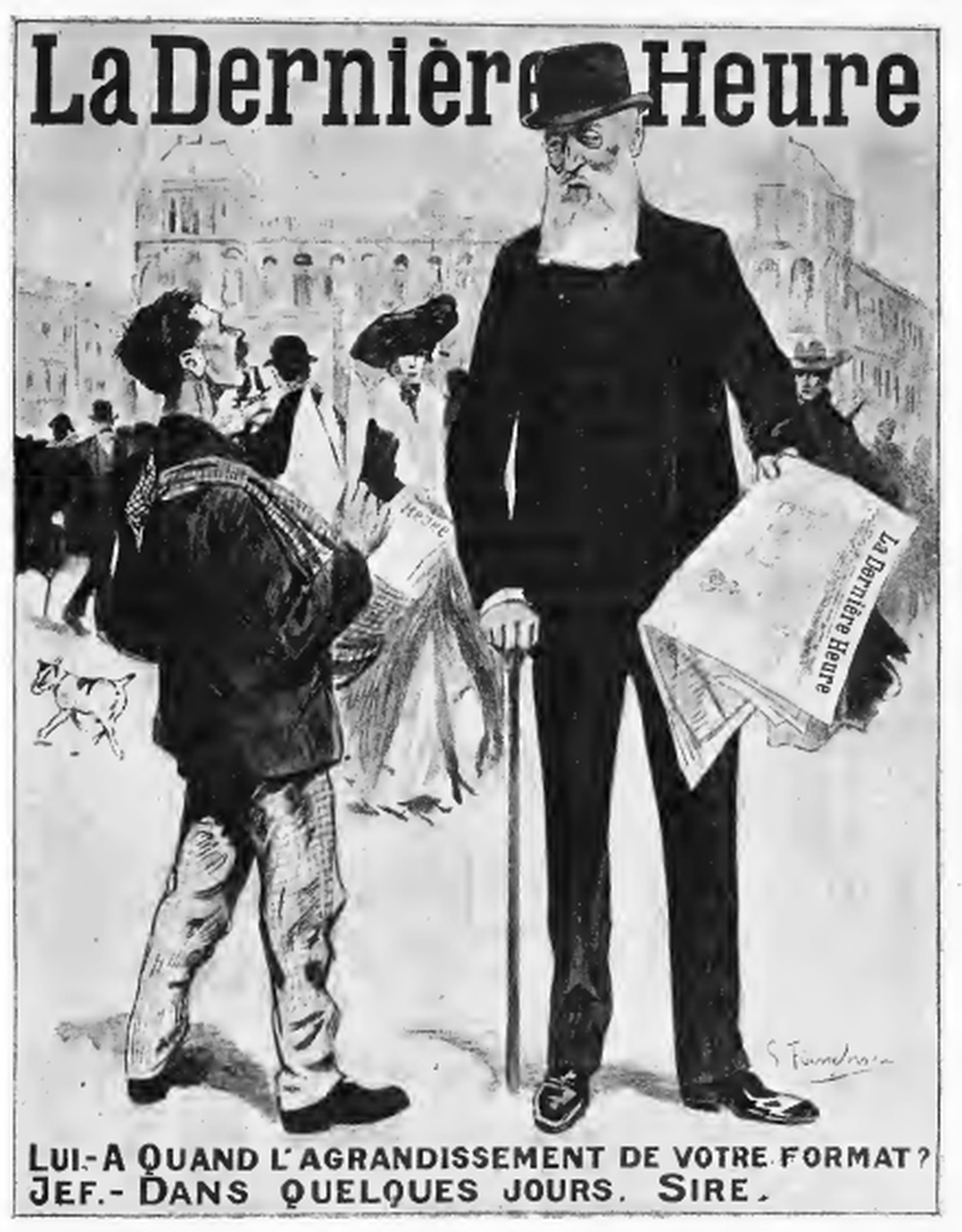
Advertising poster with King Leopold II by designer E. Flasschoen

La DH Les Sports+ was established on 19 April 1906. The paper has its headquarters in Brussels and has a liberal stance without any political affiliation. Its publisher is IPM. It has seven regional versions: Namur / Luxembourg, Liège, Tournai / Ath / Mouscron, Mons Center, Charleroi Center, Brabant, and Brussels.

In 1990 La DH sold 445,000 copies. The 2002 circulation of the paper was 112,000 copies with a market share of 17.5%. According to CIM, in 2018–2019, La DH-Les Sports+ recorded 404,720 readers, combining the digital and paper versions.
