= 1984 Intertoto Cup =

Tournament details
- Teams: 40

Final positions
- Champions: Group winners Bohemians Prague; Aarhus Gymnastikforening; Fortuna Düsseldorf; Standard Liège; AIK; Malmö FF; Videoton; Maccabi Netanya; Zürich; GKS Katowice

Tournament statistics
- Matches played: 120

In the 1984 Intertoto Cup no knock-out rounds were contested, and therefore no winner was declared.

== Group stage ==
The teams were divided into ten groups of four teams each.

=== Group 1 ===
Pos	Team	Pld	W	D	L	GF	GA	GD	Pts	B05	STG	MÖN	LYN
1	(Czechoslovakia) Bohemians Prague	6	5	0	1	20	7	+13	10	—	5–0	4–2	5–1
2	(Switzerland) St. Gallen	6	2	2	2	8	13	−5	6	3–2	—	1–2	2–1
3	(West Germany) Borussia Mönchengladbach	6	2	1	3	11	12	−1	5	0–2	1–1	—	5–0
4	(Denmark) Lyngby	6	1	1	4	8	15	−7	3	1–2	1–1	4–0	—

Source: mogiel.net
Rules for classification: 1) Points; 2) Goal difference; 3) Head-to-head points; 4) Head-to-head goals; 5) Draw.

=== Group 2 ===
Pos	Team	Pld	W	D	L	GF	GA	GD	Pts	AGF	LIL	OST	AUE
1	(Denmark) AGF	6	4	2	0	11	7	+4	10	—	5–0	4–2	5–1
2	(Norway) Lillestrøm	6	2	3	1	10	7	+3	7	3–2	—	1–3	2–1
3	(Czechoslovakia) Baník Ostrava	6	2	1	3	7	9	−2	5	0–2	1–1	—	5–0
4	(East Germany) Wismut Aue	6	0	2	4	6	11	−5	2	1–2	1–1	4–0	—

Source: mogiel.net
Rules for classification: 1) Points; 2) Goal difference; 3) Head-to-head points; 4) Head-to-head goals; 5) Draw.

=== Group 3 ===
Pos	Team	Pld	W	D	L	GF	GA	GD	Pts	DÜS	BRØ	LIÈ	RJC
1	(West Germany) Fortuna Düsseldorf	6	5	0	1	13	7	+6	10	—	3–2	3–2	3–1
2	(Denmark) Brøndby	6	3	1	2	16	11	+5	7	1–3	—	2–0	4–0
3	(Belgium) Liège	6	2	1	3	14	12	+2	5	0–1	4–4	—	2–1
4	(Netherlands) Roda JC	6	1	0	5	5	18	−13	2	1–0	1–3	1–0	—

Source: mogiel.net
Rules for classification: 1) Points; 2) Goal difference; 3) Head-to-head points; 4) Head-to-head goals; 5) Draw.

=== Group 4 ===
Pos	Team	Pld	W	D	L	GF	GA	GD	Pts	STA	OB	EIN	GAE
1	(Belgium) Standard Liège	6	3	2	1	14	8	+6	8	—	3–0	4–1	4–2
2	(Denmark) Odense	6	1	4	1	6	6	0	6	1–1	—	1–1	3–0
3	(West Germany) Eintracht Braunschweig	6	2	2	2	8	9	−1	6	3–1	0–0	—	2–1
4	(Netherlands) Go Ahead Eagles	6	1	2	3	7	12	−5	4	1–1	1–1	2–1	—

Source: mogiel.net
Rules for classification: 1) Points; 2) Goal difference; 3) Head-to-head points; 4) Head-to-head goals; 5) Draw.

=== Group 5 ===
Pos	Team	Pld	W	D	L	GF	GA	GD	Pts	AIK	GÓR	MAG	NÜR
1	(Sweden) AIK	6	4	0	2	16	7	+9	8	—	2–3	2–0	8–2
2	(Poland) Górnik Zabrze	6	4	0	2	10	6	+4	8	1–0	—	3–0	1–0
3	(East Germany) Magdeburg	6	2	1	3	7	10	−3	5	0–2	2–1	—	3–0
4	(West Germany) Nürnberg	6	1	1	4	7	17	−10	3	1–2	2–1	2–2	—

Source: mogiel.net
Rules for classification: 1) Points; 2) Goal difference; 3) Head-to-head points; 4) Head-to-head goals; 5) Draw.

=== Group 6 ===
Pos	Team	Pld	W	D	L	GF	GA	GD	Pts	MAL	KMS	STU	LUZ
1	(Sweden) Malmö FF	6	4	1	1	10	4	+6	9	—	3–0	1–0	1–0
2	(East Germany) Karl-Marx-Stadt	6	3	2	1	12	8	+4	8	2–1	—	2–1	5–0
3	(Austria) Sturm Graz	6	1	2	3	6	8	−2	4	2–2	1–1	—	1–0
4	(Switzerland) Luzern	6	1	1	4	4	12	−8	3	0–2	2–2	2–1	—

Source: mogiel.net
Rules for classification: 1) Points; 2) Goal difference; 3) Head-to-head points; 4) Head-to-head goals; 5) Draw.

=== Group 7 ===
Pos	Team	Pld	W	D	L	GF	GA	GD	Pts	VID	GÖT	VIT	LIN
1	(Hungary) Videoton	6	6	0	0	14	4	+10	12	—	2–0	1–0	2–0
2	(Sweden) IFK Göteborg	6	3	0	3	15	10	+5	6	1–3	—	3–0	4–1
3	(Czechoslovakia) Vítkovice	6	2	1	3	6	9	−3	5	2–3	3–2	—	0–0
4	(Austria) LASK	6	0	1	5	3	15	−12	1	1–3	1–5	0–1	—

Source: mogiel.net
Rules for classification: 1) Points; 2) Goal difference; 3) Head-to-head points; 4) Head-to-head goals; 5) Draw.

=== Group 8 ===
Pos	Team	Pld	W	D	L	GF	GA	GD	Pts	MNE	ADM	WET	BEI
1	(Israel) Maccabi Netanya	6	4	1	1	13	13	0	9	—	2–1	2–2	4–3
2	(Austria) Admira/Wacker Wien	6	3	2	1	15	6	+9	8	6–0	—	3–1	2–2
3	(Switzerland) Wettingen	6	2	2	2	8	9	−1	6	0–3	1–1	—	1–0
4	(Israel) Beitar Jerusalem	6	0	1	5	6	14	−8	1	1–2	0–2	0–3	—

Source: mogiel.net
Rules for classification: 1) Points; 2) Goal difference; 3) Head-to-head points; 4) Head-to-head goals; 5) Draw.

=== Group 9 ===
Table

Pos	Team	Pld	W	D	L	GF	GA	GD	Pts	ZÜR	TRV	FER	KLA
1	(Switzerland) Zürich	6	4	0	2	7	7	0	8	—	2–1	1–0	2–0
2	(Czechoslovakia) Spartak Trnava	6	3	1	2	12	9	+3	7	2–0	—	1–1	3–1
3	(Hungary) Ferencváros	6	2	2	2	9	6	+3	6	3–0	3–1	—	0–0
4	Austria Klagenfurt	6	1	1	4	7	13	−6	3	1–2	2–4	3–2	—

Source: mogiel.net
Rules for classification: 1) Points; 2) Goal difference; 3) Head-to-head points; 4) Head-to-head goals; 5) Draw.

Matches

30 June 1984
Round 1

Spartak Trnava (Czechoslovakia)	2–0	(Switzerland) Zürich
Fijalka 25' (1:0); Cabánik 56' (2:0)	FCZ summary

Trnava
Attendance: 4,000
Referee: (Czechoslovakia) Valach

7 July 1984
Round 2

Austria Klagenfurt	1–2	(Switzerland) Zürich
Bürgler 19' (pen. 1:1)	FCZ summary	15' (0:1) Schneider; 85' (1:2) Alliata; (yellow card) Baur; (yellow card) Lüdi

Wörthersee Stadion, Klagenfurt
Attendance: 1,200
Referee: (Austria) Gerhard Kapl

14 July 1984
Round 3

Ferencváros (Hungary)	3–0	(Switzerland) Zürich
Rab 35' (1:0); Zsinka 64' (2:0); Rubold 79' (3:0)	FCZ summary	(yellow card) Jerković

Üllői úti Stadion, Budapest
Attendance: 10,000
Referee: (Hungary) László Kőrös

21 July 1984
Round 4

Zürich (Switzerland)	1–0	(Hungary) Ferencváros
Rufer 80' (1:0)	FCZ summary	(yellow card) 54' Zsivótzky

Linthstrasse, Tuggen
Attendance: 1,600
Referee: (Switzerland) Franz Gächter (Aarau, Suhr, Aargau)
- Inauguration of the Linthstrasse sports field.

28 July 1984
Round 5

Zürich (Switzerland)	2–0	Austria Klagenfurt
Schneider 63' (1:0); Alliata 67' (2:0); Landolt (yellow card)	FCZ summary	63′ D. Hrstic; (yellow card) P. Hrstic

Sportplatz Rüti, Uzwil
Attendance: 1,100
Referee: (Switzerland) Philippe Mercier (Pully)

4 August 1984
Round 6

Zürich (Switzerland)	2–1	(Czechoslovakia) Spartak Trnava
Jerković 44' (1:0); Schneider 64' (2:1)	FCZ summary	59' (1:1) Dian

Löhracker, Aadorf
Attendance: 950
Referee: (Switzerland) Bruno Galler (Kirchdorf, Bern)
- Game as part of the 50th anniversary celebrations of SC Aadorf

=== Group 10 ===
Pos	Team	Pld	W	D	L	GF	GA	GD	Pts	KAT	VÅL	WAC	ÖST
1	(Poland) GKS Katowice	6	3	3	0	9	4	+5	9	—	2–1	2–1	3–0
2	(Norway) Vålerenga	6	2	3	1	11	10	+1	7	1–1	—	2–1	4–3
3	(Austria) SSW Innsbruck	6	1	3	2	8	8	0	5	0–0	2–2	—	2–0
4	(Sweden) Öster	6	0	3	3	7	13	−6	3	1–1	1–1	2–2	—

Source: mogiel.net
Rules for classification: 1) Points; 2) Goal difference; 3) Head-to-head points; 4) Head-to-head goals; 5) Draw.

== See also ==
- 1984–85 European Cup
- 1984–85 European Cup Winners' Cup
- 1984–85 UEFA Cup
