= Belgian League Cup =

Football competition

The Belgian League Cup was a Belgian association football cup created in 1973. The competition was held from 1973 by eleven clubs wanting to increase professionalism in Belgian football but lasted only three seasons before being disbanded. The tournament was then revived the first time in 1986 for one season and finally a second time in 1998 for three seasons. In 2000, due to disagreements over television rights, combined with poor attendances and a lack of interest from the top clubs, the trophy was cancelled after the 2000–01 edition. At that time the winners of the tournament qualified for the UEFA Intertoto Cup.

== League Cup finals ==
Year	Winner	Score	Runner-up	Venue	Attendance
Cup of the Eleven
1973	Anderlecht	2–0, 2–3	RFC Liège	Stade Vélodrome de Rocourt (1st leg); Constant Vanden Stock Stadium (2nd leg)	
1974	Anderlecht	1–0, 1–0	Standard Liège	Constant Vanden Stock Stadium (1st leg); Stade Maurice Dufrasne (2nd leg)	
League Cup
1975	Standard Liège	1–1, 3–2	Anderlecht	Stade Maurice Dufrasne (1st leg); Constant Vanden Stock Stadium (2nd leg)	
Callebaut Cup
1986	RFC Liège	2–0	Anderlecht	Bosuilstadion	
Nissan Cup
1998	Lommel	2–0	Germinal Ekeren	Soevereinstadion	1,500
1999	Sint-Truiden	4–3	Germinal Ekeren	Stayen	3,500
2000	Anderlecht	2–2 † (Note: Score was 2–2 after 90 minutes and extra time. Anderlecht won the penalty shoot–out 5–3.)	Excelsior Mouscron	Stade Le Canonnier	7,000
