= 1980 Intertoto Cup =

Tournament details
- Teams: 36

Final positions
- Champions: Group winners Standard Liège; Bohemians Prague; Maccabi Netanya; Sparta Prague; Nitra; Halmstad; Malmö FF; IFK Göteborg; Elfsborg

Tournament statistics
- Matches played: 108

In the 1980 Intertoto Cup no knock-out rounds were contested, and therefore no winner was declared.

== Group stage ==
The teams were divided into nine groups of four teams each.

=== Group 1 ===
Pos	Team	Pld	W	D	L	GF	GA	GD	Pts	STA	DÜS	NEU	RJC
1	(Belgium) Standard Liège	6	4	2	0	17	8	+9	10	—	5–1	2–2	4–1
2	(West Germany) Fortuna Düsseldorf	6	2	2	2	12	17	−5	6	3–3	—	1–5	3–1
3	(Switzerland) Neuchâtel Xamax	6	1	3	2	13	11	+2	5	0–1	2–2	—	3–3
4	(Netherlands) Roda JC	6	1	1	4	9	15	−6	3	1–2	1–2	2–1	—

Source: mogiel.net
Rules for classification: 1) Points; 2) Goal difference; 3) Goals scored; 4) Head-to-head points; 5) Away goals scored; 6) Draw.

=== Group 2 ===
Pos	Team	Pld	W	D	L	GF	GA	GD	Pts	B05	BRE	KAS	LIL
1	(Czechoslovakia) Bohemians Prague	6	4	2	0	14	5	+9	10	—	5–1	2–0	2–0
2	(West Germany) Werder Bremen	6	2	2	2	7	9	−2	6	1–1	—	1–2	2–0
3	(Denmark) Kastrup	6	2	1	3	6	9	−3	5	2–2	0–1	—	2–0
4	(Norway) Lillestrøm	6	1	1	4	5	9	−4	3	1–2	1–1	3–0	—

Source: mogiel.net
Rules for classification: 1) Points; 2) Goal difference; 3) Goals scored; 4) Head-to-head points; 5) Away goals scored; 6) Draw.

=== Group 3 ===
Pos	Team	Pld	W	D	L	GF	GA	GD	Pts	MNE	KB	ANT	MTA
1	(Israel) Maccabi Netanya	6	3	2	1	11	6	+5	8	—	3–0	1–1	1–0
2	(Denmark) KB	6	3	2	1	11	10	+1	8	3–2	—	3–1	3–2
3	(Belgium) Royal Antwerp	6	1	3	2	10	10	0	5	1–1	1–1	—	5–1
4	(Israel) Maccabi Tel Aviv	6	1	1	4	8	14	−6	3	1–3	1–1	3–1	—

Source: mogiel.net
Rules for classification: 1) Points; 2) Goal difference; 3) Goals scored; 4) Head-to-head points; 5) Away goals scored; 6) Draw.

=== Group 4 ===
Pos	Team	Pld	W	D	L	GF	GA	GD	Pts	SPA	ADO	STG	RWI
1	(Czechoslovakia) Sparta Prague	6	5	0	1	8	3	+5	10	—	2–1	1–0	1–0
2	(Netherlands) Den Haag	6	3	0	3	7	10	−3	6	2–1	—	1–4	1–0
3	(Switzerland) St. Gallen	6	2	0	4	10	9	+1	4	0–2	3–0	—	1–2
4	(Austria) Rapid Wien	6	2	0	4	5	8	−3	4	0–1	0–2	3–2	—

Source: mogiel.net
Rules for classification: 1) Points; 2) Goal difference; 3) Goals scored; 4) Head-to-head points; 5) Away goals scored; 6) Draw.

=== Group 5 ===
Pos	Team	Pld	W	D	L	GF	GA	GD	Pts	NIT	LIN	ESB	POL
1	(Czechoslovakia) Nitra	6	4	0	2	9	3	+6	8	—	0–1	2–0	4–0
2	(Austria) LASK	6	2	2	2	7	9	−2	6	1–2	—	2–2	2–0
3	(Denmark) Esbjerg	6	2	1	3	8	7	+1	5	0–1	4–0	—	1–2
4	(Poland) Polonia Bytom	6	2	1	3	4	9	−5	5	1–0	1–1	0–1	—

Source: mogiel.net
Rules for classification: 1) Points; 2) Goal difference; 3) Goals scored; 4) Head-to-head points; 5) Away goals scored; 6) Draw.

=== Group 6 ===
Pos	Team	Pld	W	D	L	GF	GA	GD	Pts	HAL	BRA	LNZ	YB
1	(Sweden) Halmstad	6	3	3	0	12	6	+6	9	—	1–1	0–0	4–2
2	(Czechoslovakia) Inter Bratislava	6	2	3	1	11	8	+3	7	0–3	—	2–2	3–0
3	(Austria) VOEST Linz	6	2	3	1	9	7	+2	7	2–3	2–2	—	2–0
4	(Switzerland) Young Boys	6	0	1	5	3	14	−11	1	1–1	0–3	0–1	—

Source: mogiel.net
Rules for classification: 1) Points; 2) Goal difference; 3) Goals scored; 4) Head-to-head points; 5) Away goals scored; 6) Draw.

=== Group 7 ===
Pos	Team	Pld	W	D	L	GF	GA	GD	Pts	MAL	DUI	WIL	SIO
1	(Sweden) Malmö FF	6	5	0	1	15	8	+7	10	—	4–1	1–0	2–0
2	(West Germany) Duisburg	6	4	0	2	15	11	+4	8	4–2	—	1–3	6–2
3	(Netherlands) Willem II	6	2	1	3	8	9	−1	5	1–2	0–2	—	4–3
4	(Switzerland) Sion	6	0	1	5	7	17	−10	1	2–4	0–1	0–0	—

Source: mogiel.net
Rules for classification: 1) Points; 2) Goal difference; 3) Goals scored; 4) Head-to-head points; 5) Away goals scored; 6) Draw.

=== Group 8 ===
Pos	Team	Pld	W	D	L	GF	GA	GD	Pts	GÖT	MAR	B03	SAL
1	(Sweden) IFK Göteborg	6	5	1	0	22	5	+17	11	—	4–1	5–1	6–0
2	(Bulgaria) Marek Dupnitsa	6	2	1	3	13	14	−1	5	2–3	—	2–0	4–2
3	(Denmark) B 1903	6	2	1	3	8	13	−5	5	0–3	3–2	—	3–0
4	(Austria) Casino Salzburg	6	0	3	3	6	17	−11	3	1–1	2–2	1–1	—

Source: mogiel.net
Rules for classification: 1) Points; 2) Goal difference; 3) Goals scored; 4) Head-to-head points; 5) Away goals scored; 6) Draw.

=== Group 9 ===
Pos	Team	Pld	W	D	L	GF	GA	GD	Pts	ELF	SLA	BOC	NAP
1	(Sweden) Elfsborg	6	3	1	2	8	6	+2	7	—	1–0	1–0	2–0
2	(Bulgaria) Slavia Sofia	6	3	1	2	8	8	0	7	2–1	—	2–0	3–2
3	(West Germany) Bochum	6	3	0	3	8	8	0	6	2–1	4–1	—	2–1
4	(Socialist Federal Republic of Yugoslavia) Napredak Kruševac	6	1	2	3	7	9	−2	4	2–2	0–0	2–0	—

Source: mogiel.net
Rules for classification: 1) Points; 2) Goal difference; 3) Goals scored; 4) Head-to-head points; 5) Away goals scored; 6) Draw.

== See also ==
- 1980–81 European Cup
- 1980–81 UEFA Cup Winners' Cup
- 1980–81 UEFA Cup
