= 1982–83 Belgian First Division =

80th season of top-tier football in Belgium

Belgian First Division
- Season: 1982–83

Statistics of Belgian First Division in the 1982–83 season.

== Overview ==
Location of teams in Belgian First Division 1982–83

It was contested by 18 teams, and Standard Liège won the championship.

== League standings ==
Pos	Team	Pld	W	D	L	GF	GA	GD	Pts	Qualification or relegation
1	Standard Liège	34	22	6	6	78	34	+44	50	Qualified for 1983–84 European Cup
2	R.S.C. Anderlecht	34	20	9	5	74	33	+41	49	Qualified for 1983–84 UEFA Cup
3	Royal Antwerp FC	34	20	6	8	56	30	+26	46	Qualified for 1983–84 UEFA Cup
4	K.A.A. Gent	34	18	10	6	60	42	+18	46	Qualified for 1983–84 UEFA Cup
5	Club Brugge K.V.	34	17	9	8	58	49	+9	43	
6	K.S.K. Beveren	34	15	10	9	68	38	+30	40	Qualified for 1983–84 European Cup Winners' Cup
7	K. Waterschei S.V. Thor Genk	34	14	9	11	48	49	−1	37	
8	Lokeren	34	13	9	12	42	38	+4	35	
9	R.F.C. de Liège	34	11	10	13	37	54	−17	32	
10	R.W.D. Molenbeek	34	9	13	12	32	38	−6	31	
11	K.V. Kortrijk	34	10	9	15	41	55	−14	29	
12	Cercle Brugge K.S.V.	34	7	15	12	38	49	−11	29	
13	R.F.C. Seraing	34	8	12	14	41	62	−21	28	
14	Lierse S.K.	34	10	7	17	34	52	−18	27	
15	Beerschot	34	8	9	17	43	61	−18	25	
16	K.S.V. Waregem	34	7	10	17	36	51	−15	24	
17	K.S.K. Tongeren	34	7	7	20	39	64	−25	21	Relegated to Division II
18	FC Winterslag	34	5	10	19	36	62	−26	20	Relegated to Division II

== Results ==
Home \ Away	AND	ANT	BEE	BEV	CER	CLU	GNT	KOR	FCL	LIE	LOK	MOL	SER	STA	TON	WAR	WTG	WIN
Anderlecht		2–1	3–1	1–2	0–0	5–2	3–1	2–2	1–2	2–0	1–0	2–0	4–0	1–4	6–0	4–1	4–0	2–1
Antwerp	1–3		2–1	2–1	2–0	6–0	5–1	3–0	3–0	1–0	0–0	2–0	2–0	0–2	2–1	3–1	2–0	2–1
Beerschot	1–4	0–1		2–3	3–2	2–2	1–2	3–2	0–0	0–2	2–2	1–1	3–0	0–0	1–1	2–1	2–3	2–3
Beveren	0–0	1–2	7–0		3–0	4–0	1–3	2–0	6–0	2–2	2–1	4–0	3–3	4–1	1–1	2–2	0–0	7–2
Cercle Brugge	2–4	0–2	2–2	0–0		0–1	1–1	1–0	5–2	1–1	3–0	0–0	0–0	3–1	3–1	2–1	1–2	2–2
Club Brugge	1–1	3–1	1–0	3–0	1–1		2–2	2–1	3–1	2–0	1–0	5–1	4–0	0–1	2–0	2–1	2–2	3–1
Gent	2–1	1–1	2–1	1–1	1–1	3–1		2–2	1–0	3–2	2–1	2–0	5–1	3–1	3–0	0–0	4–2	2–1
Kortrijk	1–5	2–1	1–3	2–1	2–1	1–1	1–3		1–1	1–2	0–3	1–1	3–1	0–0	3–2	1–0	2–0	5–0
Liège	0–0	1–1	3–1	1–1	2–1	2–2	1–0	1–0		2–1	1–3	2–1	0–0	1–5	2–1	3–0	3–1	1–1
Lierse	0–2	0–2	1–1	0–0	0–0	1–2	1–2	0–1	1–0		1–0	0–2	3–1	0–1	1–0	1–1	4–1	2–0
Lokeren	1–1	1–1	1–3	2–1	0–0	2–0	2–1	4–0	0–2	1–2		2–1	2–2	2–0	3–1	2–2	3–0	2–1
Molenbeek	0–2	3–0	0–0	0–1	2–0	2–1	0–0	0–0	1–1	2–0	0–0		1–1	0–2	3–1	2–0	2–0	1–0
Seraing	1–2	1–0	1–0	3–1	1–1	1–2	3–0	2–2	3–0	0–2	0–0	1–1		0–4	3–0	2–0	2–7	0–0
Standard Liège	1–1	4–1	1–2	2–0	6–1	2–0	2–1	2–1	1–0	7–0	3–0	3–2	4–2		3–1	2–0	2–2	3–0
Tongeren	1–1	0–1	4–2	0–2	0–0	2–3	1–3	2–0	1–1	4–1	0–1	2–1	0–0	2–2		3–2	1–2	0–2
Waregem	2–1	0–0	2–0	2–0	1–1	2–3	1–2	1–2	2–1	2–2	2–0	0–0	4–1	1–4	0–2		0–0	2–0
Waterschei Thor	1–1	0–0	1–0	0–2	1–3	0–0	0–0	3–1	4–0	3–0	2–0	1–1	0–3	2–1	2–0	1–0		2–1
Winterslag	1–2	0–3	0–1	0–3	4–0	1–1	1–1	0–0	2–0	3–1	0–1	1–1	2–2	1–1	2–4	0–0	2–3	

Legend: Blue = home team win; Yellow = draw; Red = away team win.

== Attendances ==
No.	Club	Average	Change	Highest
1	Anderlecht	22,353	15,9%	38,000
2	Standard	17,794	-5,8%	36,000
3	Club Brugge	15,647	6,4%	30,000
4	Antwerp	11,882	3,3%	25,000
5	Gent	10,618	-32,9%	23,000
6	Beveren	10,588	17,3%	21,000
7	Waterschei	9,559	6,2%	21,000
8	Beerschot	8,412	26,8%	18,000
9	Lokeren	8,029	0,3%	18,000
10	RWDM	7,441	-10,3%	20,000
11	Lierse	7,206	-16,1%	18,000
12	Liège	7,059	-34,2%	28,000
13	Kortrijk	6,500	-1,3%	15,000
14	Seraing	6,176	58,4%	15,000
15	Winterslag	5,765	-35,9%	14,000
16	Cercle	5,735	-7,6%	22,000
17	Waregem	5,382	-25,6%	14,000
18	Tongeren	4,529	-28,0%	11,000
