= 1981–82 Belgian First Division =

79th season of top-tier football in Belgium

Belgian First Division
- Season: 1981–82

Statistics of Belgian First Division in the 1981–82 season.

== Overview ==
Location of teams in Belgian First Division 1981–82

It was contested by 18 teams, and Standard Liège won the championship.

== League standings ==
Pos	Team	Pld	W	D	L	GF	GA	GD	Pts	Qualification or relegation
1	Standard Liège	34	19	10	5	59	28	+31	48	Qualified for 1982–83 European Cup
2	R.S.C. Anderlecht	34	19	8	7	56	31	+25	46	Qualified for 1982–83 UEFA Cup
3	K.A.A. Gent	34	16	13	5	38	20	+18	45	Qualified for 1982–83 UEFA Cup
4	K.S.C. Lokeren Oost-Vlaanderen	34	17	10	7	56	32	+24	44	Qualified for 1982–83 UEFA Cup
5	Royal Antwerp FC	34	17	9	8	45	23	+22	43	
6	K.V. Kortrijk	34	14	10	10	39	35	+4	38	
7	K.S.K. Beveren	34	14	9	11	45	33	+12	37	
8	Lierse S.K.	34	14	8	12	49	51	−2	36	
9	K. Waterschei S.V. Thor Genk	34	11	8	15	44	55	−11	30	Qualified for 1982–83 European Cup Winners' Cup
10	K.S.K. Tongeren	34	11	8	15	40	54	−14	30	
11	R.W.D. Molenbeek	34	11	7	16	41	49	−8	29	
12	Waregem	34	10	9	15	30	34	−4	29	
13	FC Winterslag	34	10	9	15	24	49	−25	29	
14	Club Brugge K.V.	34	10	8	16	57	61	−4	28	
15	Cercle Brugge K.S.V.	34	10	8	16	46	46	0	28	
16	R.F.C. de Liège	34	10	8	16	36	50	−14	28	
17	Beringen FC	34	9	9	16	33	50	−17	27	Relegated to Division II
18	KV Mechelen	34	6	5	23	28	65	−37	17	Relegated to Division II

== Results ==
Home \ Away	AND	ANT	BER	BEV	CER	CLU	GNT	KOR	FCL	LIE	LOK	MEC	MOL	STA	TON	WAR	WTG	WIN
Anderlecht		1–1	0–0	2–1	3–1	2–1	2–1	0–0	2–1	2–0	3–2	2–0	0–1	1–1	4–0	3–0	5–1	4–0
Antwerp	0–0		2–0	2–0	4–1	3–0	1–1	0–1	0–2	4–1	1–0	3–0	1–0	1–2	1–0	2–0	3–0	3–0
Beringen	2–2	0–1		2–2	1–1	1–0	1–2	0–1	4–1	2–1	0–2	0–2	2–1	0–0	1–0	0–0	3–1	2–1
Beveren	3–0	1–1	3–1		1–2	2–0	0–0	3–0	0–4	0–0	1–1	5–1	1–2	3–2	3–1	1–0	3–1	0–0
Cercle Brugge	1–2	0–1	3–2	0–0		2–2	0–0	1–2	3–0	2–2	0–2	2–1	1–2	0–1	4–0	2–1	2–3	8–0
Club Brugge	0–0	2–1	2–0	1–2	2–3		1–2	1–0	4–1	1–0	0–2	2–2	5–0	0–3	0–0	1–1	1–2	4–0
Gent	1–0	0–0	3–0	0–0	3–1	2–1		3–0	1–0	1–0	1–1	2–0	2–1	0–0	1–0	1–0	2–0	0–0
Kortrijk	2–3	0–0	4–0	0–2	1–1	3–1	0–0		3–1	1–2	1–1	1–1	2–1	0–0	4–1	1–0	2–1	0–1
Liège	0–3	0–0	1–4	0–1	1–1	1–0	0–0	0–0		3–1	0–4	5–2	3–0	0–2	0–0	2–1	2–1	3–1
Lierse	2–1	1–0	1–1	4–2	2–4	2–1	3–1	2–2	1–1		3–1	2–0	2–2	3–1	5–1	1–0	0–4	3–1
Lokeren	1–1	1–0	2–0	2–1	6–2	0–2	0–0	1–2	3–1	4–0		2–1	1–1	0–2	1–0	1–1	5–2	1–0
Mechelen	0–1	1–2	1–2	0–0	2–1	0–3	1–0	3–1	0–0	0–2	1–2		1–0	3–1	0–4	0–1	1–1	0–1
Molenbeek	1–2	4–2	1–1	1–0	3–0	2–1	0–0	0–2	4–0	2–0	1–1	4–2		1–3	0–3	0–0	2–1	1–1
Standard Liège	2–0	1–0	3–1	0–3	2–2	1–0	3–1	3–0	0–0	3–0	2–2	6–0	2–0		2–2	1–0	3–1	2–1
Tongeren	0–2	1–2	1–0	1–0	4–2	3–3	1–0	1–0	1–3	0–1	1–3	2–1	2–1	1–1		2–1	0–0	1–0
Waregem	3–1	1–1	3–0	1–0	2–0	1–2	1–2	0–0	1–0	3–2	0–1	1–0	1–0	1–0	3–3		0–1	1–1
Waterschei Thor	2–1	1–2	2–0	0–1	2–4	2–2	2–2	0–1	1–0	0–0	1–0	1–0	2–1	1–1	2–2	1–1		3–0
Winterslag	0–1	0–0	0–0	1–0	1–0	0–0	0–3	1–2	1–0	0–0	0–0	3–1	2–1	0–3	3–1	1–0	3–1	

Legend: Blue = home team win; Yellow = draw; Red = away team win.

== Attendances ==
#	Club	Average
1	Anderlecht	19,294
2	Standard	18,882
3	Gent	15,824
4	Club Brugge	14,706
5	Antwerp	11,506
6	Liège	10,735
7	Beveren	9,029
8	Waterschei	9,000
9	Winterslag	9,000
10	Lierse	8,588
11	RWDM	8,294
12	Lokeren	8,006
13	Beringen	7,647
14	Waregem	7,235
15	Kortrijk	6,588
16	Tongeren	6,294
17	Cercle	6,206
18	Mechelen	6,206
