= 1982 Intertoto Cup =

Tournament details
- Teams: 36

Final positions
- Champions: Group winners Standard Liège; Widzew Łódź; Aarhus Gymnastikforening; Lyngby; Admira/Wacker Wien; Bohemians Prague; IK Brage; Östers IF; IFK Göteborg

In the 1982 Intertoto Cup no knock-out rounds were contested, and therefore no winner was declared.

== Group stage ==
The 36 competing teams were divided into nine groups of four teams each.

=== Group 1 ===
Pos	Team	Pld	W	D	L	GF	GA	GD	Pts	STA	LEV	CHM	HVI
1	(Belgium) Standard Liège	6	3	1	2	12	10	+2	7	—	2–1	1–0	3–0
2	(West Germany) Bayer Leverkusen	6	2	2	2	12	9	+3	6	4–0	—	2–0	1–0
3	(Bulgaria) Cherno More	6	2	2	2	7	8	−1	6	0–1	5–0	—	7–1
4	(Denmark) Hvidovre	6	1	3	2	5	9	−4	5	1–1	3–4	3–2	—

Source: mogiel.net
Rules for classification: 1) Points; 2) Goal difference; 3) Goals scored; 4) Head-to-head points; 5) Away goals scored; 6) Draw.

=== Group 2 ===
Pos	Team	Pld	W	D	L	GF	GA	GD	Pts	WID	BIE	STG	LIÈ
1	(Poland) Widzew Łódź	6	3	1	2	8	7	+1	7	—	2–1	0–1	3–1
2	(West Germany) Arminia Bielefeld	6	2	2	2	10	9	+1	6	1–1	—	3–1	1–1
3	(Switzerland) St. Gallen	6	3	0	3	7	8	−1	6	1–2	1–2	—	1–0
4	(Belgium) Liège	6	2	1	3	8	9	−1	5	2–0	3–2	1–2	—

Source: mogiel.net
Rules for classification: 1) Points; 2) Goal difference; 3) Goals scored; 4) Head-to-head points; 5) Away goals scored; 6) Draw.

=== Group 3 ===
Pos	Team	Pld	W	D	L	GF	GA	GD	Pts	AGF	BRE	NIT	STU
1	(Denmark) AGF	6	4	0	2	14	12	+2	8	—	2–1	1–0	6–1
2	(West Germany) Werder Bremen	6	3	1	2	21	13	+8	7	4–1	—	3–3	7–2
3	(Czechoslovakia) Nitra	6	2	1	3	16	16	0	5	3–4	3–5	—	5–3
4	(Austria) Sturm Graz	6	2	0	4	11	21	−10	4	3–0	2–1	0–2 *	—

Source: mogiel.net
Rules for classification: 1) Points; 2) Goal difference; 3) Goals scored; 4) Head-to-head points; 5) Away goals scored; 6) Draw.
- Note: The result of the match Sturm Graz–Nitra was later revoked because the match only lasted 55 minutes.

=== Group 4 ===
Pos	Team	Pld	W	D	L	GF	GA	GD	Pts	LYN	DUI	MOL	LUZ
1	(Denmark) Lyngby	6	3	2	1	11	7	+4	8	—	1–3	0–0	2–0
2	(West Germany) Duisburg	6	3	1	2	12	7	+5	7	1–2	—	4–1	2–0
3	(Poland) Motor Lublin	6	1	3	2	8	11	−3	5	2–2	3–2	—	2–2
4	(Switzerland) Luzern	6	1	2	3	4	10	−6	4	1–4	0–0	1–0	—

Source: mogiel.net
Rules for classification: 1) Points; 2) Goal difference; 3) Goals scored; 4) Head-to-head points; 5) Away goals scored; 6) Draw.

=== Group 5 ===
Pos	Team	Pld	W	D	L	GF	GA	GD	Pts	ADM	HTA	NOR	HKS
1	(Austria) Admira/Wacker Wien	6	4	1	1	8	6	+2	9	—	2–1	1–0	3–0
2	(Israel) Hapoel Tel Aviv	6	4	0	2	12	10	+2	8	4–0	—	2–0	1–0
3	(Sweden) Norrköping	6	2	0	4	14	8	+6	4	0–1	5–0	—	7–1
4	(Israel) Hapoel Kfar Saba	6	1	1	4	8	18	−10	3	1–1	3–4	3–2	—

Source: mogiel.net
Rules for classification: 1) Points; 2) Goal difference; 3) Goals scored; 4) Head-to-head points; 5) Away goals scored; 6) Draw.

=== Group 6 ===
Pos	Team	Pld	W	D	L	GF	GA	GD	Pts	B05	GWA	YB	LIN
1	(Czechoslovakia) Bohemians Prague	6	6	0	0	16	3	+13	12	—	1–0	5–0	2–1
2	(Poland) Gwardia Warsaw	6	2	1	3	7	8	−1	5	0–1	—	2–2	1–0
3	(Switzerland) Young Boys	6	2	1	3	8	13	−5	5	1–3	2–1	—	0–2
4	(Austria) LASK	6	1	0	5	6	13	−7	2	1–4	2–3	0–3	—

Source: mogiel.net
Rules for classification: 1) Points; 2) Goal difference; 3) Goals scored; 4) Head-to-head points; 5) Away goals scored; 6) Draw.

=== Group 7 ===
Pos	Team	Pld	W	D	L	GF	GA	GD	Pts	BRA	PSZ	SPA	WSC
1	(Sweden) Brage	6	5	0	1	10	2	+8	10	—	2–0	2–0	3–0
2	(Poland) Pogoń Szczecin	6	3	1	2	10	9	+1	7	1–0	—	2–0	3–3
3	(Czechoslovakia) Sparta Prague	6	1	2	3	4	8	−4	4	0–1	1–0	—	2–2
4	(Austria) Wiener Sport-Club	6	0	3	3	10	15	−5	3	1–2	3–4	1–1	—

Source: mogiel.net
Rules for classification: 1) Points; 2) Goal difference; 3) Goals scored; 4) Head-to-head points; 5) Away goals scored; 6) Draw.

=== Group 8 ===
Pos	Team	Pld	W	D	L	GF	GA	GD	Pts	ÖST	BRN	ŁKS	ZÜR
1	(Sweden) Öster	6	4	1	1	12	7	+5	9	—	2–0	4–3	3–0
1	(Czechoslovakia) Zbrojovka Brno	6	4	1	1	11	6	+5	9	2–0	—	2–1	4–1
3	(Poland) ŁKS Łódź	6	1	2	3	8	10	−2	4	1–1	0–0	—	3–0
4	(Switzerland) Zürich	6	1	0	5	7	15	−8	2	1–2	2–3	3–0	—

Source: mogiel.net
Rules for classification: 1) Points; 2) Goal difference; 3) Goals scored; 4) Head-to-head points; 5) Away goals scored; 6) Draw.

Matches

26 June 1982
Round 1

Zbrojovka Brno (Czechoslovakia)	4–1	(Switzerland) Zürich
Nesvacil 6' (1:0) (Staub) 15' (o.g.); Mikulicka 55' (3:0); Češek 62' (4:0)	FCZ summary	69' (4:1) Kundert; (yellow card) Schönenberger

Brno
Attendance: 2,500
Referee: (Czechoslovakia) Wencl

3 July 1982
Round 2

Zürich (Switzerland)	1–2	(Sweden) Öster
Seiler 62' (1:2)	FCZ summary	27' (0:1) Stavander; 42' (0:2) Stavander

Paul-Walser-Stiftung, Wohlen, Aargau
Attendance: 800
Referee: (Switzerland) Ulrich Nyffenegger (Nidau)

10 July 1982
Round 3

Öster (Sweden)	3–0	(Switzerland) Zürich
Mattsson 40' (1:0); Hallén 78' (2:0); Hallén 90' (3:0)	FCZ summary	(yellow card) Maissen; (yellow card) Lüdi; (yellow card) Zappa

Borgholm
Attendance: 2,500
Referee: (Sweden) Harrisson

17 July 1982
Round 4

Zürich (Switzerland)	2–3	(Czechoslovakia) Zbrojovka Brno
Rufer 2' (1:0); Zwicker 62' (2:2)	FCZ summary	12' (pen. 1:1) Janečka; 42' (1:2) Janečka; 78' (2:3) Nesvacil; (yellow card) 80' Mikulicka

Sportplatz Moos, Affoltern am Albis
Attendance: 900
Referee: (Switzerland) Jakob Baumann (Schaffhausen)

24 July 1982
Round 5

ŁKS Łódź (Poland)	3–0	(Switzerland) Zürich
Plachta 26' (1:0); Wesolowski 36' (2:0); Milczarski 84' (3:0)	FCZ summary	(red card) Zappa; (yellow card) Jerković; (yellow card) Landolt

Łódź
Attendance: 1,000
Referee: (Poland) Władysław Urbańczyk

31 July 1982
Round 6

Zürich (Switzerland)	3–0	(Poland) ŁKS Łódź
Jerković 53' (1:0); Rufer 68' (2:0); Lüdi 87' (3:0)	FCZ summary

Beichlen, Wädenswil
Attendance: 1,000
Referee: (Switzerland) Jean-Marie Macheret (Rueyres-Saint-Laurent)

=== Group 9 ===
Pos	Team	Pld	W	D	L	GF	GA	GD	Pts	GÖT	NÆS	CHB	OST
1	(Sweden) IFK Göteborg	6	4	1	1	19	11	+8	9	—	5–0	4–4	2–1
2	(Denmark) Næstved	6	3	1	2	13	14	−1	7	4–2	—	3–1	5–1
3	(Bulgaria) Chernomorets Burgas	6	2	1	3	17	16	+1	5	2–4	4–0	—	5–2
4	(Czechoslovakia) Baník Ostrava	6	1	1	4	8	16	−8	3	0–2	1–1	3–1	—

Source: mogiel.net
Rules for classification: 1) Points; 2) Goal difference; 3) Goals scored; 4) Head-to-head points; 5) Away goals scored; 6) Draw.

== See also ==
- 1982–83 European Cup
- 1982–83 UEFA Cup Winners' Cup
- 1982–83 UEFA Cup
