= 1978–79 UEFA Cup =

8th season of Europe's secondary club football tournament organised by UEFA

- Dates: 5 September 1978 – 23 May 1979

Final positions
- Champions: (West Germany) Borussia Mönchengladbach (2nd title)
- Runners-up: (Socialist Federal Republic of Yugoslavia) Red Star Belgrade

Tournament statistics
- Matches played: 126
- Goals scored: 365 (2.9 per match)
- Attendance: 3,035,950 (24,095 per match)
- Top scorer(s): Allan Simonsen (Borussia Mönchengladbach); 9 goals

The 1978–79 UEFA Cup was the eighth season of the UEFA Cup, the third-tier club football competition organised by UEFA. The final was played over two legs at the Red Star Stadium, Belgrade, Yugoslavia, and at the Rheinstadion, Düsseldorf, West Germany. It was won by Borussia Mönchengladbach of West Germany, who defeated Red Star Belgrade of Yugoslavia by an aggregate result of 2–1 to claim their second UEFA Cup title.

Red Star Belgrade became the third Yugoslav and second Serbian team to reach a European final, but couldn't defeat the more experienced West German side, who reached their fourth European final out of five in a seven-year span.

== Association team allocation ==
A total of 64 teams from 31 UEFA member associations participate in the 1978–79 UEFA Cup. The original allocation scheme was as follows:

- 3 associations have four teams qualify.
- 3 associations have three teams qualify.
- 18 associations have two teams qualify.
- 7 associations have one team qualify.

East Germany and Bulgaria were the two associations selected to have a third birth for this season, while Poland and Switzerland went back to two qualified teams.

Associations in the 1978–79 UEFA Cup

Four teams
West Germany
England
Italy
Three teams
Spain
East Germany
Bulgaria

Two teams
Netherlands	Soviet Union	Belgium
(Socialist Federal Republic of Yugoslavia) Yugoslavia	Hungary	Portugal
Czechoslovakia	Poland	France
Scotland	Greece	Switzerland
Sweden	Romania	Austria
Turkey	Denmark	Norway

One team
(Republic of Ireland) Republic of Ireland
(Northern Ireland) Northern Ireland
Finland
Cyprus
Malta
Iceland
Luxembourg

Did not compete
Wales
Albania

Wales: There was no national league in Wales before 1992 and the only competition organised by the Football Association of Wales was the Welsh Cup so Wales had just a single participant in European competitions, the winner (or best placed Welsh team as several English teams also competed) of the Welsh Cup which competed in the UEFA Cup Winners' Cup.
Albania: Albanian teams returned to European competition in 1978 after five years of absence, but the country choose to not participate in the UEFA Cup, which wouldn't happen until 1981. Luftëtari would have qualified for the UEFA Cup by league position.

=== Teams ===
The labels in the parentheses show how each team qualified for competition:

- TH: Title holders
- CW: Cup winners
- CR: Cup runners-up
- LC: League Cup winners
- 2nd, 3rd, 4th, 5th, 6th, etc.: League position
- P-W: End-of-season European competition play-offs winners

Qualified teams for 1978–79 UEFA Cup
(West Germany) Borussia Mönchengladbach (2nd)	(West Germany) Hertha BSC (3rd)	(West Germany) Stuttgart (4th)	(West Germany) Duisburg (5th)
(England) Everton (3rd)	(England) Manchester City (4th)	(England) Arsenal (5th)	(England) West Bromwich Albion (6th)
(Italy) Vicenza (2nd)	(Italy) Torino (3rd)	(Italy) AC Milan (4th)	(Italy) Napoli (6th)
(Spain) Athletic Bilbao (3rd)	(Spain) Valencia (4th)	(Spain) Sporting Gijón (5th)	(East Germany) Dynamo Berlin (3rd)
(East Germany) Lokomotive Leipzig (4th)	(East Germany) Carl Zeiss Jena (5th)	(Bulgaria) CSKA Sofia (2nd)	(Bulgaria) Levski-Spartak Sofia (3rd)
(Bulgaria) Botev Plovdiv (4th)	(Netherlands) Ajax (2nd)	(Netherlands) Twente (4th)	(Soviet Union) Dinamo Tbilisi (2nd)
(Soviet Union) Torpedo Moscow (3rd)	(Belgium) Standard Liège (3rd)	(Belgium) Lierse (4th)	(Socialist Federal Republic of Yugoslavia) Red Star Belgrade (2nd)
(Socialist Federal Republic of Yugoslavia) Hajduk Split (3rd)	(Hungary) Budapest Honvéd (2nd)	(Hungary) MTK Budapest (3rd)	(Portugal) Benfica (2nd)
(Portugal) Braga (4th)	(Czechoslovakia) Dukla Prague (2nd)	(Czechoslovakia) Lokomotíva Košice (3rd)	(Poland) Śląsk Wrocław (2nd)
(Poland) Lech Poznań (3rd)	(France) Nantes (2nd)	(France) Strasbourg (3rd)	(Scotland) Dundee United (3rd)
(Scotland) Hibernian (4th)	(Greece) Panathinaikos (3rd)	(Greece) Olympiacos (4th)	(Switzerland) Basel (3rd)
(Switzerland) Lausanne-Sport (4th)	(Sweden) Elfsborg (2nd)	(Sweden) Norrköping (4th)	(Romania) Argeș Pitești (2nd)
(Romania) Politehnica Timișoara (3rd)	(Austria) Rapid Wien (2nd)	(Austria) Sturm Graz (4th)	(Turkey) Galatasaray (3rd)
(Turkey) Adanaspor (4th)	(Denmark) B 1903 (2nd)	(Denmark) Esbjerg (3rd)	(Norway) Molde (3rd)
(Norway) IK Start (4th)	(Republic of Ireland) Finn Harps (2nd)	(Northern Ireland) Glentoran (2nd)	(Finland) KuPS Kuopio (2nd)
(Cyprus) Pezoporikos Larnaca (3rd)	(Malta) Hibernians (2nd)	(Iceland) ÍBV (3rd)	(Luxembourg) Jeunesse Esch (2nd)

== Schedule ==
The schedule of the competition was as follows. Matches were scheduled for Wednesdays, though some matches took place on Tuesdays or Thursdays. Also, both away games for Śląsk Wrocław in the first two rounds were held on a Saturday.

Schedule for 1978–79 UEFA Cup
Round	First leg	Second leg
First round	5–16 September 1978	14–28 September 1978
Second round	18–21 October 1978	31 October – 2 November 1978
Third round	22–23 November 1978	6 December 1978
Quarter-finals	7 March 1979	20–21 March 1979
Semi-finals	10–11 April 1979	24–25 April 1979
Final	9 May 1979	23 May 1979

== First round ==
Team 1	Agg.	Team 2	1st leg	2nd leg
Dukla Prague (Czechoslovakia)	2–1	(Italy) Vicenza	1–0	1–1
Milan (Italy)	1–1 (7–6 p)	(Czechoslovakia) Lokomotíva Košice	1–0	0–1 (a.e.t.)
CSKA Sofia (Bulgaria)	3–5	(Spain) Valencia	2–1	1–4
Borussia Mönchengladbach (West Germany)	7–2	(Austria) Sturm Graz	5–1	2–1
Argeș Pitești (Romania)	5–1	(Greece) Panathinaikos	3–0	2–1
Athletic Bilbao (Spain)	2–3	(Netherlands) Ajax	2–0	0–3
Finn Harps (Republic of Ireland)	0–10	(England) Everton	0–5	0–5
Jeunesse Esch (Luxembourg)	0–2	(Switzerland) Lausanne-Sport	0–0	0–2
Nantes (France)	0–2	(Portugal) Benfica	0–2	0–0
Sporting Gijón (Spain)	3–1	(Italy) Torino	3–0	0–1
Braga (Portugal)	7–3	(Malta) Hibernians	5–0	2–3
Galatasaray (Turkey)	2–6	(England) West Bromwich Albion	1–3	1–3
BFC Dynamo (East Germany)	6–6 (a)	(Socialist Federal Republic of Yugoslavia) Red Star Belgrade	5–2	1–4
KuPS (Finland)	6–5	(Denmark) B 1903	2–1	4–4
Basel (Switzerland)	3–7	(West Germany) Stuttgart	2–3	1–4
Torpedo Moscow (Soviet Union)	7–3	(Norway) Molde	4–0	3–3
Elfsborg (Sweden)	3–4	(France) Strasbourg	2–0	1–4
MSV Duisburg (West Germany)	10–2	(Poland) Lech Poznań	5–0	5–2
Standard Liège (Belgium)	1–0	(Scotland) Dundee United	1–0	0–0
Start (Norway)	0–1	(Denmark) Esbjerg	0–0	0–1
Arsenal (England)	7–1	(East Germany) Lokomotive Leipzig	3–0	4–1
Carl Zeiss Jena (East Germany)	3–2	(Belgium) Lierse	1–0	2–2
ÍBV (Iceland)	1–1 (a)	(Northern Ireland) Glentoran	0–0	1–1
Twente (Netherlands)	3–4	(England) Manchester City	1–1	2–3
Hibernian (Scotland)	3–2	(Sweden) IFK Norrköping	3–2	0–0
Politehnica Timișoara (Romania)	3–2	(Hungary) MTK Budapest	2–0	1–2
Pezoporikos Larnaca (Cyprus)	3–7	(Poland) Śląsk Wrocław	2–2	1–5
Olympiacos (Greece)	3–4	(Bulgaria) Levski Sofia	2–1	1–3 (a.e.t.)
Dinamo Tbilisi (Soviet Union)	3–1	(Italy) Napoli	2–0	1–1
Hajduk Split (Socialist Federal Republic of Yugoslavia)	3–2	(Austria) Rapid Wien	2–0	1–2
Hertha BSC (West Germany)	2–1	(Bulgaria) Botev Plovdiv	0–0	2–1
Budapest Honvéd (Hungary)	8–2	(Turkey) Adanaspor	6–0	2–2

=== First leg ===
13 September 1978

Dukla Prague (Czechoslovakia)	1–0	(Italy) Vicenza
Nehoda 6'	Report

Stadion Juliska, Prague
Attendance: 7,308
Referee: Jan Beck (Netherlands)

13 September 1978

Milan (Italy)	1–0	(Czechoslovakia) Lokomotíva Košice
Novellino 34'	Report

San Siro, Milan
Attendance: 34,259
Referee: Charles Scerri (Malta)

13 September 1978

CSKA Sofia (Bulgaria)	2–1	(Spain) Valencia
Dzhevizov 7'; Hristov 54'	Report	Solsona 71'

Vasil Levski National Stadium, Sofia
Attendance: 28,000
Referee: Clive Thomas (Wales)

13 September 1978

Borussia Mönchengladbach (West Germany)	5–1	(Austria) Sturm Graz
Bruns 4', 89'; Gores 48'; Nielsen 67'; Simonsen 89'	Report	Jurtin 11'

Bökelbergstadion, Mönchengladbach
Attendance: 10,800
Referee: Bruno Galler (Switzerland)

13 September 1978

Argeș Pitești (Romania)	3–0	(Greece) Panathinaikos
Toma 19'; Moiceanu 75', 89'	Report

Stadionul 1 Mai, Pitești
Attendance: 15,000
Referee: Adolf Mathias (Austria)

13 September 1978

Athletic Bilbao (Spain)	2–0	(Netherlands) Ajax
Churruca 9'; Vidal 58'	Report

San Mamés Stadium, Bilbao
Attendance: 33,000
Referee: Walter Horstmann (West Germany)

12 September 1978

Finn Harps (Republic of Ireland)	0–5	(England) Everton
	Report	King 14', 48'; Thomas 15'; Latchford 62'; Walsh 64'

Finn Park, Ballybofey
Attendance: 5,100
Referee: Alain Delmer (France)

13 September 1978

Jeunesse Esch (Luxembourg)	0–0	(Switzerland) Lausanne-Sport
	Report

Stade de la Frontière, Esch-sur-Alzette
Attendance: 2,200
Referee: Michel Vautrot (France)

13 September 1978

Nantes (France)	0–2	(Portugal) Benfica
	Report	Chalana 38'; Nené 41'

Stade Marcel Saupin, Nantes
Attendance: 12,128
Referee: Alexis Ponnet (Belgium)

13 September 1978

Sporting Gijón (Spain)	3–0	(Italy) Torino
Ferrero 4'; Morán 14', 68'	Report

El Molinón, Gijón
Attendance: 22,400
Referee: Franz Wöhrer (Austria)

Enzo Ferrero scored an olympic goal.

13 September 1978

Braga (Portugal)	5–0	(Malta) Hibernians
Chico Gordo 2', 15', 19', 78'; Lito 74'	Report

Estádio 1º de Maio, Braga
Attendance: 15,000
Referee: Antonio Tomeo Palanques (Spain)

13 September 1978

Galatasaray (Turkey)	1–3	(England) West Bromwich Albion
Terim 88' (pen.)	Report	Robson 6'; Cunningham 63', 69'

İzmir Alsancak Stadium, İzmir
Attendance: 38,443
Referee: Francisc Coloşi (Romania)

13 September 1978

BFC Dynamo (East Germany)	5–2	(Socialist Federal Republic of Yugoslavia) Red Star Belgrade
Riediger 16', 28', 69'; Netz 20'; Brillat 89'	Report	Šestić 34'; Savić 36'

Friedrich-Ludwig-Jahn-Sportpark, East Berlin
Attendance: 24,000
Referee: Gianfranco Menegali (Italy)

13 September 1978

KuPS (Finland)	2–1	(Denmark) B 1903
Mönkkönen 16'; E. Heiskanen 73'	Report	Haarbye 41'

Väinölänniemen stadion, Kuopio
Attendance: 646
Referee: Erik Fredriksson (Sweden)

13 September 1978
20:00

Basel (Switzerland)	2–3	(West Germany) Stuttgart
Stohler 30'; Tanner 78'	Report	D. Hoeneß 44'; Ohlicher 54', 70'

St. Jakob Stadium, Basel
Attendance: 25,000
Referee: Brian McGinlay (Scotland)

13 September 1978

Torpedo Moscow (Soviet Union)	4–0	(Norway) Molde
Vasilyev 5'; Mironov 35'; Grishin 78'; Suchilin 86'	Report

Torpedo Stadium, Moscow
Attendance: 7,000
Referee: Talat Tokat (Turkey)

13 September 1978

Elfsborg (Sweden)	2–0	(France) Strasbourg
Svensson 17'; Magnusson 43' (pen.)	Report

Ryavallen, Borås
Attendance: 3,383
Referee: Ole Amundsen (Denmark)

13 September 1978

MSV Duisburg (West Germany)	5–0	(Poland) Lech Poznań
Jara 21'; Worm 23', 37'; Alhaus 32'; Büssers 88'	Report

Wedaustadion, Duisburg
Attendance: 8,000
Referee: John Homewood (England)

12 September 1978

Standard Liège (Belgium)	1–0	(Scotland) Dundee United
Denier 40'	Report

Jules Ottenstadion, Ghent
Attendance: 8,500
Referee: Jaromír Fausek (Czechoslovakia)

13 September 1978

Start (Norway)	0–0	(Denmark) Esbjerg
	Report

Kristiansand Stadion, Kristiansand
Attendance: 1,417
Referee: Olavi Peltola (Finland)

13 September 1978

Arsenal (England)	3–0	(East Germany) Lokomotive Leipzig
Stapleton 67', 68'; Sunderland 80'	Report

Highbury, London
Attendance: 34,233
Referee: Svein-Inge Thime (Norway)

13 September 1978

Carl Zeiss Jena (East Germany)	1–0	(Belgium) Lierse
Töpfer 25'	Report

Ernst-Abbe-Sportfeld, Jena
Attendance: 12,000
Referee: Augusto Lamo Castillo (Spain)

5 September 1978

ÍBV (Iceland)	0–0	(Northern Ireland) Glentoran
	Report

Kópavogsvöllur, Kópavogur
Attendance: 1,000
Referee: Bob Valentine (Scotland)

13 September 1978

Twente (Netherlands)	1–1	(England) Manchester City
Thoresen 50'	Report	Watson 24'

Diekman Stadion, Enschede
Attendance: 12,000
Referee: Ángel Franco Martínez (Spain)

13 September 1978

Hibernian (Scotland)	3–2	(Sweden) IFK Norrköping
Higgins 25', 88'; Temperley 49'	Report	Ohlsson 64'; Andersson 66'

Easter Road, Edinburgh
Attendance: 10,000
Referee: Torben Månsson (Denmark)

13 September 1978

Politehnica Timișoara (Romania)	2–0	(Hungary) MTK Budapest
Cotec 10'; Păltinișanu 55'	Report

Stadionul 1 Mai, Timișoara
Attendance: 12,000
Referee: Klaus Scheurell (East Germany)

16 September 1978

Pezoporikos Larnaca (Cyprus)	2–2	(Poland) Śląsk Wrocław
Theofanous 40', 64'	Report	Pawłowski 44' (pen.); Sybis 86'

GSZ Stadium, Larnaca
Attendance: 3,000
Referee: Atanas Mateev (Bulgaria)

14 September 1978

Olympiacos (Greece)	2–1	(Bulgaria) Levski Sofia
Kritikopoulos 51'; Kaltsas 76'	Report	Barzov 43'

Karaiskakis Stadium, Piraeus
Attendance: 32,000
Referee: André Daina (Switzerland)

13 September 1978

Dinamo Tbilisi (Soviet Union)	2–0	(Italy) Napoli
Kipiani 39'; Shengelia 49'	Report

Dinamo Stadium, Tbilisi
Attendance: 75,000
Referee: Josef Bucek (Austria)

13 September 1978

Hajduk Split (Socialist Federal Republic of Yugoslavia)	2–0	(Austria) Rapid Wien
Čop 30'; Luketin 89'	Report

Kod Stare Plinare Stadium, Split
Attendance: 15,000
Referee: Paul Bonett (Malta)

13 September 1978

Hertha BSC (West Germany)	0–0	(Bulgaria) Botev Plovdiv
	Report

Olympiastadion, West Berlin
Attendance: 4,500
Referee: John Hunting (England)

14 September 1978

Budapest Honvéd (Hungary)	6–0	(Turkey) Adanaspor
Lukács 16'; Weimper 64', 67'; Gyimesi 65'; Bodonyi 78'; Nagy 88'	Report

Bozsik József Stadion, Budapest
Attendance: 6,000
Referee: Mehmet Mishku (Albania)

=== Second leg ===
27 September 1978

Vicenza (Italy)	1–1	(Czechoslovakia) Dukla Prague
Briaschi 14'	Report	Gajdůšek 50'

Stadio Romeo Menti, Vicenza
Attendance: 16,938
Referee: Heinz Einbeck (East Germany)

Dukla Prague won 2–1 on aggregate.

27 September 1978

Lokomotíva Košice (Czechoslovakia)	1–0 (a.e.t.)	(Italy) Milan
Kozák 81'	Report
Penalties
Kozák (penalty scored); Ujhely (penalty scored); Jacko (penalty missed); Móder (penalty scored); Suchánek (penalty scored); Dobrovič (penalty scored); Fecko (penalty scored); Repík (penalty missed)	6–7	(penalty scored) Maldera; (penalty missed) Novellino; (penalty scored) Chiodi; (penalty scored) Buriani; (penalty scored) Antonelli; (penalty scored) Morini; (penalty scored) De Vecchi; (penalty scored) Baresi

Štadión Lokomotívy, Košice
Attendance: 32,000
Referee: Rudolf Renggli (Switzerland)

1–1 on aggregate. Milan won in a penalty shoot-out.

27 September 1978

Valencia (Spain)	4–1	(Bulgaria) CSKA Sofia
Saura 16', 78'; Felman 54'; Kempes 82'	Report	Hristov 17'

Estadio Luís Casanova, Valencia
Attendance: 50,000
Referee: Michel Kitabdjian (France)

Valencia won 5–3 on aggregate.

27 September 1978

Sturm Graz (Austria)	1–2	(West Germany) Borussia Mönchengladbach
Schilcher 65'	Report	Simonsen 5'; Bruns 50'

Bundesstadion Liebenau, Graz
Attendance: 7,000
Referee: Eduard Shklovski (Soviet Union)

Borussia Mönchengladbach won 7–2 on aggregate.

27 September 1978

Panathinaikos (Greece)	1–2	(Romania) Argeș Pitești
Gonios 51'	Report	Nicolae 55'; Radu II 68'

Leoforos Alexandras Stadium, Athens
Attendance: 23,444
Referee: Alojzy Jargusz (Poland)

Argeș Pitești won 5–1 on aggregate.

27 September 1978

Ajax (Netherlands)	3–0	(Spain) Athletic Bilbao
Clarke 38' (pen.), 55'; Lerby 89'	Report

De Meer Stadion, Amsterdam
Attendance: 25,150
Referee: Pat Partridge (England)

Ajax won 3–2 on aggregate.

26 September 1978

Everton (England)	5–0	(Republic of Ireland) Finn Harps
King 21'; Latchford 25'; Walsh 53'; Ross 60'; Dobson 63'	Report

Goodison Park, Liverpool
Attendance: 21,611
Referee: Vojtech Christov (Czechoslovakia)

Everton won 10–0 on aggregate.

26 September 1978

Lausanne-Sport (Switzerland)	2–0	(Luxembourg) Jeunesse Esch
Diserens 39'; Sampedro 76'	Report

Stade Olympique de la Pontaise, Lausanne
Attendance: 4,000
Referee: Jean-Claude Jourquin (Belgium)

Lausanne-Sport won 2–0 on aggregate.

27 September 1978

Benfica (Portugal)	0–0	(France) Nantes
	Report

Estádio da Luz, Lisbon
Attendance: 45,000
Referee: Paul Kindervater (West Germany)

Benfica won 2–0 on aggregate.

27 September 1978

Torino (Italy)	1–0	(Spain) Sporting Gijón
Graziani 64'	Report

Stadio Comunale, Turin
Attendance: 25,219
Referee: Béla Nagy (Hungary)

Sporting Gijón won 3–1 on aggregate.

20 September 1978

Hibernians (Malta)	3–2	(Portugal) Braga
Carter 20' (pen.), 61' (pen.); Spiteri-Gonzi 86'	Report	Chico Gordo 29'; Ronaldo 35'

Hibernians Stadium, Paola
Attendance: 1,207
Referee: Heinz Fahnler (Austria)

Braga won 7–3 on aggregate.

27 September 1978

West Bromwich Albion (England)	3–1	(Turkey) Galatasaray
Robson 33'; Cunningham 39' (pen.); Trewick 47'	Report	İnal 44'

The Hawthorns, West Bromwich
Attendance: 22,380
Referee: António Garrido (Portugal)

West Bromwich Albion won 6–2 on aggregate.

27 September 1978

Red Star Belgrade (Socialist Federal Republic of Yugoslavia)	4–1	(East Germany) BFC Dynamo
Savić 58'; Borovnica 69', 80'; Šestić 89'	Report	Riediger 12'

Red Star Stadium, Belgrade
Attendance: 38,766
Referee: Sándor Kuti (Hungary)

6–6 on aggregate, Red Star Belgrade won on away goals rule.

27 September 1978

B 1903 (Denmark)	4–4	(Finland) KuPS
Kristiansen 14'; Schmidt-Jensen 19'; Larsen 20'; Damm 82'	Report	E. Heiskanen 9'; A. Heiskanen 15'; Hämäläinen 27'; Arvo Rautio 82'

Gentofte Sportspark, Gentofte
Attendance: 1,500
Referee: Henry Øberg (Norway)

KuPS won 6–5 on aggregate.

27 September 1978
20:00

Stuttgart (West Germany)	4–1	(Switzerland) Basel
Kelsch 24', 48', 68'; Müller 64'	Report	Schönenberger 35'

Neckarstadion, Stuttgart
Attendance: 23,000
Referee: Myroslav Stupar (Soviet Union)

Stuttgart won 7–3 on aggregate.

27 September 1978

Molde (Norway)	3–3	(Soviet Union) Torpedo Moscow
Brakstad 43'; Bjørnå 53'; Fuglset 67'	Report	Vasilyev 26', 71'; Suchilin 81'

Molde Stadion, Molde
Attendance: 2,813
Referee: Alf Grey (England)

Torpedo Moscow won 7–3 on aggregate.

27 September 1978

Strasbourg (France)	4–1	(Sweden) Elfsborg
Piasecki 7'; Tanter 27'; Gemmrich 74'; Wagner 80'	Report	Ahlström 41'

Stade de la Meinau, Strasbourg
Attendance: 26,505
Referee: Gwyn Owen (Wales)

Strasbourg won 4–3 on aggregate.

27 September 1978

Lech Poznań (Poland)	2–5	(West Germany) MSV Duisburg
Kasalik 34'; Okoński 83'	Report	Büssers 4'; Worm 22', 72'; Fenten 30'; Buttgereit 71'

Stadion im. 22 lipca, Poznań
Attendance: 7,000
Referee: Marijan Rauš (Yugoslavia)

MSV Duisburg won 10–2 on aggregate.

27 September 1978

Dundee United (Scotland)	0–0	(Belgium) Standard Liège
	Report

Tannadice Park, Dundee
Attendance: 11,656
Referee: Siegfried Kirschen (East Germany)

Standard Liège won 1–0 on aggregate.

27 September 1978

Esbjerg (Denmark)	1–0	(Norway) Start
Iversen 88'	Report

Esbjerg Stadium, Esbjerg
Attendance: 4,730
Referee: Rolf Eriksson (Sweden)

Esbjerg won 1–0 on aggregate.

27 September 1978

Lokomotive Leipzig (East Germany)	1–4	(England) Arsenal
Stapleton 72' (o.g.)	Report	Brady 20' (pen.); Sunderland 51'; Stapleton 62', 66'

Zentralstadion, Leipzig
Attendance: 22,000
Referee: Tome Manojlovski (Yugoslavia)

Arsenal won 7–1 on aggregate.

27 September 1978

Lierse (Belgium)	2–2	(East Germany) Carl Zeiss Jena
Bosch 40'; Vandenbergh 51'	Report	Schnuphase 57'; Töpfer 83' (pen.)

Herman Vanderpoortenstadion, Lier
Attendance: 12,000
Referee: Ian Foote (Scotland)

Carl Zeiss Jena won 3–2 on aggregate.

14 September 1978

Glentoran (Northern Ireland)	1–1	(Iceland) ÍBV
Caskey 44'	Report	Óskarsson 89'

The Oval, Belfast
Attendance: 3,235
Referee: Egbert Mulder (Netherlands)

1–1 on aggregate, ÍBV won on away goals rule.

27 September 1978

Manchester City (England)	3–2	(Netherlands) Twente
Wildschut 8' (o.g.); Kidd 70'; Bell 84'	Report	Van der Vall 49'; Gritter 85'

Maine Road, Manchester
Attendance: 29,330
Referee: Riccardo Lattanzi (Italy)

Manchester City won 4–3 on aggregate.

27 September 1978

IFK Norrköping (Sweden)	0–0	(Scotland) Hibernian
	Report

Nya Parken, Norrköping
Attendance: 1,260
Referee: Marian Środecki (Poland)

Hibernian won 3–2 on aggregate.

27 September 1978

MTK Budapest (Hungary)	2–1	(Romania) Politehnica Timișoara
Koritár 50'; Nadu 67' (o.g.)	Report	Petrescu 77'

Hungaria Stadion, Budapest
Attendance: 4,000
Referee: Atanas Mateev (Bulgaria)

Politehnica Timișoara won 3–2 on aggregate.

27 September 1978

Śląsk Wrocław (Poland)	5–1	(Cyprus) Pezoporikos Larnaca
Garłowski 12'; Faber 30'; Olesiak 34'; Kwiatkowski 60'; Sybis 86'	Report	Lambrou 13'

Stadion Olimpijski, Wrocław
Attendance: 8,000
Referee: Volker Roth (West Germany)

Śląsk Wrocław won 7–3 on aggregate.

28 September 1978

Levski Sofia (Bulgaria)	3–1 (a.e.t.)	(Greece) Olympiacos
Milkov 47'; Panov 52'; Voynov 96' (pen.)	Report	Kaltsas 60'

Vasil Levski National Stadium, Sofia
Attendance: 45,000
Referee: Paolo Casarin (Italy)

Levski Sofia won 4–3 on aggregate.

27 September 1978

Napoli (Italy)	1–1	(Soviet Union) Dinamo Tbilisi
Savoldi 79' (pen.)	Report	Daraselia 64'

Stadio San Paolo, Naples
Attendance: 61,000
Referee: René Vigliani (France)

Dinamo Tbilisi won 3–1 on aggregate.

27 September 1978

Rapid Wien (Austria)	2–1	(Socialist Federal Republic of Yugoslavia) Hajduk Split
Krejcirik 73'; Francker 89'	Report	Žungul 24'

Gerhard Hanappi Stadium, Vienna
Attendance: 28,000
Referee: Ángel Franco Martínez (Spain)

Hajduk Split won 3–2 on aggregate.

27 September 1978

Botev Plovdiv (Bulgaria)	1–2	(West Germany) Hertha BSC
Slavkov 49'	Report	Granitza 32', 41'

Hristo Botev Stadium, Plovdiv
Attendance: 33,000
Referee: Jakob Baumann (Switzerland)

Hertha BSC won 2–1 on aggregate.

27 September 1978

Adanaspor (Turkey)	2–2	(Hungary) Budapest Honvéd
Kaynak 44'; Erdoğan 61'	Report	Lukács 24'; Pintér 54'

Adana 5 Ocak Stadium, Adana
Attendance: 4,200
Referee: Dimitar Parmakov (Bulgaria)

Budapest Honvéd won 8–2 on aggregate.

== Second round ==
Team 1	Agg.	Team 2	1st leg	2nd leg
Ajax (Netherlands)	5–0	(Switzerland) Lausanne-Sport	1–0	4–0
Budapest Honvéd (Hungary)	4–2	(Romania) Politehnica Timișoara	4–0	0–2
Everton (England)	2–2 (a)	(Czechoslovakia) Dukla Prague	2–1	0–1
Argeș Pitești (Romania)	4–6	(Spain) Valencia	2–1	2–5
Carl Zeiss Jena (East Germany)	0–3	(West Germany) MSV Duisburg	0–0	0–3 (a.e.t.)
Torpedo Moscow (Soviet Union)	2–3	(West Germany) Stuttgart	2–1	0–2
Hajduk Split (Socialist Federal Republic of Yugoslavia)	2–2 (a)	(England) Arsenal	2–1	0–1
Hertha BSC (West Germany)	2–1	(Soviet Union) Dinamo Tbilisi	2–0	0–1
ÍBV (Iceland)	1–4	(Poland) Śląsk Wrocław	0–2	1–2
KuPS (Finland)	1–6	(Denmark) Esbjerg	0–2	1–4
Manchester City (England)	4–2	(Belgium) Standard Liège	4–0	0–2
Levski Sofia (Bulgaria)	1–4	(Italy) Milan	1–1	0–3
Strasbourg (France)	2–1	(Scotland) Hibernian	2–0	0–1
Braga (Portugal)	0–3	(England) West Bromwich Albion	0–2	0–1
Benfica (Portugal)	0–2	(West Germany) Borussia Mönchengladbach	0–0	0–2 (a.e.t.)
Sporting Gijón (Spain)	1–2	(Socialist Federal Republic of Yugoslavia) Red Star Belgrade	0–1	1–1

=== First leg ===
18 October 1978

Ajax (Netherlands)	1–0	(Switzerland) Lausanne-Sport
Lerby 23'	Report

Olympic Stadium, Amsterdam
Attendance: 22,500
Referee: Valentin Lipatov (Soviet Union)

18 October 1978

Budapest Honvéd (Hungary)	4–0	(Romania) Politehnica Timișoara
Weimper 5' (pen.), 88'; Gyimesi 81'; Pintér 84'	Report

Bozsik József Stadion, Budapest
Attendance: 5,000
Referee: Theodoros Tsanaklidis (Greece)

18 October 1978

Everton (England)	2–1	(Czechoslovakia) Dukla Prague
Latchford 19'; King 76'	Report	Macela 85'

Goodison Park, Liverpool
Attendance: 32,857
Referee: António Garrido (Portugal)

18 October 1978

Argeș Pitești (Romania)	2–1	(Spain) Valencia
Dobrin 10'; Moiceanu 72'	Report	Saura 27'

Stadionul 1 Mai, Pitești
Attendance: 20,000
Referee: John Homewood (England)

18 October 1978

Carl Zeiss Jena (East Germany)	0–0	(West Germany) MSV Duisburg
	Report

Ernst-Abbe-Sportfeld, Jena
Attendance: 15,000
Referee: Talal Tokat (Turkey)

18 October 1978

Torpedo Moscow (Soviet Union)	2–1	(West Germany) Stuttgart
Vasilyev 3'; Sakharov 61'	Report	Hoeneß 26'

Torpedo Stadium, Moscow
Attendance: 15,000
Referee: Rolf Eriksson (Sweden)

18 October 1978

Hajduk Split (Socialist Federal Republic of Yugoslavia)	2–1	(England) Arsenal
Čop 15'; Đorđević 39'	Report	Brady 16'

Kod Stare Plinare Stadium, Split
Attendance: 18,540
Referee: Ernst Dörflinger (Switzerland)

18 October 1978

Hertha BSC (West Germany)	2–0	(Soviet Union) Dinamo Tbilisi
Nüssing 41'; Granitza 63'	Report

Olympiastadion, West Berlin
Attendance: 15,000
Referee: Milorad Vlajić (Yugoslavia)

21 October 1978

ÍBV (Iceland)	0–2	(Poland) Śląsk Wrocław
	Report	Kwiatkowski 52'; Faber 68'

Hásteinsvöllur, Vestmannaeyjar
Attendance: 2,000
Referee: Dominic Byrne (Republic of Ireland)

18 October 1978

KuPS (Finland)	0–2	(Denmark) Esbjerg
	Report	Bach 15'; Nielsen 23'

Mikkelin Urheilupuisto, Mikkeli
Attendance: 870
Referee: Siegfried Kirschen (East Germany)

18 October 1978

Manchester City (England)	4–0	(Belgium) Standard Liège
Hartford 12'; Kidd 85' (pen.), 86'; Palmer 88'	Report

Maine Road, Manchester
Attendance: 27,498
Referee: Nicolae Rainea (Romania)

19 October 1978

Levski Sofia (Bulgaria)	1–1	(Italy) Milan
Milkov 12'	Report	Chiodi 10'

Vasil Levski National Stadium, Sofia
Attendance: 48,000
Referee: Erich Linemayr (Austria)

18 October 1978

Strasbourg (France)	2–0	(Scotland) Hibernian
Gemmrich 22'; Piasecki 61' (pen.)	Report

Stade de la Meinau, Strasbourg
Attendance: 25,000
Referee: Sándor Kuti (Hungary)

18 October 1978

Braga (Portugal)	0–2	(England) West Bromwich Albion
	Report	Regis 52', 54'

Estádio 1º de Maio, Braga
Attendance: 19,500
Referee: Rudolf Frickel (West Germany)

18 October 1978

Benfica (Portugal)	0–0	(West Germany) Borussia Mönchengladbach
	Report

Estádio da Luz, Lisbon
Attendance: 60,000
Referee: Charles Corver (Netherlands)

18 October 1978

Sporting Gijón (Spain)	0–1	(Socialist Federal Republic of Yugoslavia) Red Star Belgrade
	Report	Blagojević 85'

El Molinón, Gijón
Attendance: 30,000
Referee: John Carpenter (Republic of Ireland)

=== Second leg ===
1 November 1978

Lausanne-Sport (Switzerland)	0–4	(Netherlands) Ajax
	Report	Erkens 10'; Clarke 13', 83'; Arnesen 37'

Stade Olympique de la Pontaise, Lausanne
Attendance: 16,000
Referee: Nikola Dudin (Bulgaria)

Ajax won 5–0 on aggregate.

1 November 1978

Politehnica Timișoara (Romania)	2–0	(Hungary) Budapest Honvéd
Roșca 51'; Păltinișanu 89'	Report

Stadionul 1 Mai, Timișoara
Attendance: 8,000
Referee: Myroslav Stupar (Soviet Union)

Budapest Honvéd won 4–2 on aggregate.

1 November 1978

Dukla Prague (Czechoslovakia)	1–0	(England) Everton
Gajdůšek 81'	Report

Stadion Juliska, Prague
Attendance: 28,000
Referee: Heinz Aldinger (West Germany)

2–2 on aggregate, Dukla Prague won on away goals rule.

1 November 1978

Valencia (Spain)	5–2	(Romania) Argeș Pitești
Kempes 34', 40'; Bonhof 61'; Saura 65'; Solsona 85'	Report	Moiceanu 48'; Nicolae 78'

Estadio Luis Casanova, Valencia
Attendance: 60,000
Referee: Alexis Ponnet (Belgium)

Valencia won 6–4 on aggregate.

1 November 1978

MSV Duisburg (West Germany)	3–0 (a.e.t.)	(East Germany) Carl Zeiss Jena
Dietz 98'; Jara 107'; Fruck 119'	Report

Wedaustadion, Duisburg
Attendance: 28,000
Referee: Brian McGinlay (Scotland)

MSV Duisburg won 3–0 on aggregate.

1 November 1978

Stuttgart (West Germany)	2–0	(Soviet Union) Torpedo Moscow
Müller 61'; Volkert 71'	Report

Neckarstadion, Stuttgart
Attendance: 63,500
Referee: Ángel Franco Martínez (Spain)

Stuttgart won 3–2 on aggregate.

1 November 1978

Arsenal (England)	1–0	(Socialist Federal Republic of Yugoslavia) Hajduk Split
Young 83'	Report

Highbury, London
Attendance: 41,787
Referee: Alberto Michelotti (Italy)

2–2 on aggregate, Arsenal won on away goals rule.

1 November 1978

Dinamo Tbilisi (Soviet Union)	1–0	(West Germany) Hertha BSC
Shengelia 57'	Report

Dinamo Stadium, Tbilisi
Attendance: 72,000
Referee: Anders Mattsson (Finland)

Hertha BSC won 2–1 on aggregate.

2 November 1978

Śląsk Wrocław (Poland)	2–1	(Iceland) ÍBV
Nocko 15'; Kwiatkowski 87'	Report	Hallgrímsson 31'

Stadion Olimpijski, Wrocław
Attendance: 5,000
Referee: Antonin Vencl (Czechoslovakia)

Śląsk Wrocław won 4–1 on aggregate.

1 November 1978

Esbjerg (Denmark)	4–1	(Finland) KuPS
Bertelsen 10'; Iversen 25'; Østergaard 59' (pen.); Bach 60'	Report	Loikkanen 79'

Esbjerg Stadium, Esbjerg
Attendance: 4,800
Referee: Eysteinn Guðmundsson (Iceland)

Esbjerg won 6–1 on aggregate.

1 November 1978

Standard Liège (Belgium)	2–0	(England) Manchester City
Sigurvinsson 63', 85' (pen.)	Report

Stade Maurice Dufrasne, Liège
Attendance: 25,000
Referee: Franz Wöhrer (Austria)

Manchester City won 4–2 on aggregate.

1 November 1978

Milan (Italy)	3–0	(Bulgaria) Levski Sofia
Maldera 12'; Bigon 39'; Chiodi 75'	Report

San Siro, Milan
Attendance: 24,635
Referee: John Gordon (Scotland)

Milan won 4–1 on aggregate. On 23 November 1978, UEFA fined Milan $14,000 for a bribery attempt to the Scottish referee John Gordon and linesmen Rollo Kyle and David McCartney (Italian club took the officials to shop for free the day before the game). Curiously, UEFA did not sanction the referee at all, however, Scottish Football Association suspended him.

1 November 1978

Hibernian (Scotland)	1–0	(France) Strasbourg
McLeod 64' (pen.)	Report

Easter Road, Edinburgh
Attendance: 14,662
Referee: Klaus Scheurell (East Germany)

Strasbourg won 2–1 on aggregate.

1 November 1978

West Bromwich Albion (England)	1–0	(Portugal) Braga
Brown 46'	Report

The Hawthorns, West Bromwich
Attendance: 26,019
Referee: Marian Kustoń (Poland)

West Bromwich Albion won 3–0 on aggregate.

31 October 1978

Borussia Mönchengladbach (West Germany)	2–0 (a.e.t.)	(Portugal) Benfica
Bruns 95' (pen.); Klinkhammer 119'	Report

Bökelbergstadion, Mönchengladbach
Attendance: 36,000
Referee: Clive Thomas (Wales)

Borussia Mönchengladbach won 2–0 on aggregate.

1 November 1978

Red Star Belgrade (Socialist Federal Republic of Yugoslavia)	1–1	(Spain) Sporting Gijón
Petrović 80'	Report	Borovnica 22' (o.g.)

Red Star Stadium, Belgrade
Attendance: 39,137
Referee: Georges Konrath (France)

Red Star Belgrade won 2–1 on aggregate.

== Third round ==
Team 1	Agg.	Team 2	1st leg	2nd leg
Milan (Italy)	2–5	(England) Manchester City	2–2	0–3
Borussia Mönchengladbach (West Germany)	5–3	(Poland) Śląsk Wrocław	1–1	4–2
Budapest Honvéd (Hungary)	4–3	(Netherlands) Ajax	4–1	0–2
Esbjerg (Denmark)	2–5	(West Germany) Hertha BSC	2–1	0–4
Strasbourg (France)	0–4	(West Germany) MSV Duisburg	0–0	0–4
Red Star Belgrade (Socialist Federal Republic of Yugoslavia)	2–1	(England) Arsenal	1–0	1–1
Valencia (Spain)	1–3	(England) West Bromwich Albion	1–1	0–2
Stuttgart (West Germany)	4–5	(Czechoslovakia) Dukla Prague	4–1	0–4

=== First leg ===
23 November 1978

Milan (Italy)	2–2	(England) Manchester City
Bigon 59', 82'	Report	Kidd 37'; Power 57'

San Siro, Milan
Attendance: 27,102
Referee: Heinz Einbeck (East Germany)

22 November 1978

Borussia Mönchengladbach (West Germany)	1–1	(Poland) Śląsk Wrocław
Kulik 36' (pen.)	Report	Olesiak 50'

Bökelbergstadion, Mönchengladbach
Attendance: 20,000
Referee: David Syme (Scotland)

22 November 1978

Budapest Honvéd (Hungary)	4–1	(Netherlands) Ajax
Nagy 48', 63'; Lukács 66'; Weimper 88' (pen.)	Report	Clarke 80' (pen.)

Ferenc Puskás Stadium, Budapest
Attendance: 11,000
Referee: Paolo Casarin (Italy)

22 November 1978

Esbjerg (Denmark)	2–1	(West Germany) Hertha BSC
Hansen 12' (pen.); Jespersen 48'	Report	Milewski 6'

Esbjerg Stadium, Esbjerg
Attendance: 16,700
Referee: Aleksander Suchanek (Poland)

22 November 1978

Strasbourg (France)	0–0	(West Germany) MSV Duisburg
	Report

Stade de la Meinau, Strasbourg
Attendance: 21,855
Referee: António Garrido (Portugal)

22 November 1978

Red Star Belgrade (Socialist Federal Republic of Yugoslavia)	1–0	(England) Arsenal
Blagojević 12'	Report

Red Star Stadium, Belgrade
Attendance: 35,256
Referee: Eldar Azimzade (Soviet Union)

22 November 1978

Valencia (Spain)	1–1	(England) West Bromwich Albion
Felman 16'	Report	Cunningham 48'

Estadio Luis Casanova, Valencia
Attendance: 45,000
Referee: Bruno Galler (Switzerland)

22 November 1978

Stuttgart (West Germany)	4–1	(Czechoslovakia) Dukla Prague
Volkert 8', 33' (pen.); Kelsch 66'; Ohlicher 87'	Report	Gajdůšek 57'

Neckarstadion, Stuttgart
Attendance: 71,000
Referee: John Homewood (England)

=== Second leg ===
6 December 1978

Manchester City (England)	3–0	(Italy) Milan
Booth 15'; Hartford 31'; Kidd 43'	Report

Maine Road, Manchester
Attendance: 38,026
Referee: Heinz Aldinger (West Germany)

Manchester City won 5–2 on aggregate.

6 December 1978

Śląsk Wrocław (Poland)	2–4	(West Germany) Borussia Mönchengladbach
Pawłowski 25' (pen.), 50'	Report	Simonsen 35', 85', 89'; Nielsen 48'

Stadion Olimpijski, Wrocław
Attendance: 25,000
Referee: Pat Partridge (England)

Borussia Mönchengladbach won 5–3 on aggregate.

6 December 1978

Ajax (Netherlands)	2–0	(Hungary) Budapest Honvéd
Clarke 45' (pen.); Tahamata 68'	Report

De Meer Stadion, Amsterdam
Attendance: 21,000
Referee: Augusto Lamo Castillo (Spain)

Budapest Honvéd won 4–3 on aggregate.

6 December 1978

Hertha BSC (West Germany)	4–0	(Denmark) Esbjerg
Milewski 3', 25', 32', 54'	Report

Olympiastadion, West Berlin
Attendance: 3,295
Referee: Jaromír Fausek (Czechoslovakia)

Hertha BSC won 5–2 on aggregate.

6 December 1978

MSV Duisburg (West Germany)	4–0	(France) Strasbourg
Worm 33'; Weber 43', 76'; Fruck 48'	Report

Wedaustadion, Duisburg
Attendance: 18,000
Referee: Gianfranco Menegali (Italy)

MSV Duisburg won 4–0 on aggregate.

6 December 1978

Arsenal (England)	1–1	(Socialist Federal Republic of Yugoslavia) Red Star Belgrade
Sunderland 69'	Report	Savić 87'

Highbury, London
Attendance: 41,566
Referee: Ulf Eriksson (Sweden)

Red Star Belgrade won 2–1 on aggregate.

6 December 1978

West Bromwich Albion (England)	2–0	(Spain) Valencia
Statham 5'; Brown 80'	Report

The Hawthorns, West Bromwich
Attendance: 34,164
Referee: Robert Wurtz (France)

West Bromwich Albion won 3–1 on aggregate.

6 December 1978

Dukla Prague (Czechoslovakia)	4–0	(West Germany) Stuttgart
Hoeneß 24' (o.g.); Vízek 46'; Pelc 52' (pen.); Gajdůšek 87'	Report

Stadion Juliska, Prague
Attendance: 25,000
Referee: Marcel Van Langenhove (Belgium)

Dukla Prague won 5–4 on aggregate.

== Quarter-finals ==
Team 1	Agg.	Team 2	1st leg	2nd leg
Budapest Honvéd (Hungary)	4–4 (a)	(West Germany) MSV Duisburg	2–3	2–1
Hertha BSC (West Germany)	3–2	(Czechoslovakia) Dukla Prague	1–1	2–1
Manchester City (England)	2–4	(West Germany) Borussia Mönchengladbach	1–1	1–3
Red Star Belgrade (Socialist Federal Republic of Yugoslavia)	2–1	(England) West Bromwich Albion	1–0	1–1

=== First leg ===
7 March 1979

Budapest Honvéd (Hungary)	2–3	(West Germany) MSV Duisburg
Varga 36'; Weimper 49' (pen.)	Report	Worm 22', 55'; Seliger 84'

Népstadion, Budapest
Attendance: 12,000
Referee: Georges Konrath (France)

7 March 1979

Hertha BSC (West Germany)	1–1	(Czechoslovakia) Dukla Prague
Nüssing 50'	Report	Pelc 44'

Olympiastadion, West Berlin
Attendance: 23,300
Referee: Svein-Inge Thime (Norway)

7 March 1979

Manchester City (England)	1–1	(West Germany) Borussia Mönchengladbach
Channon 26'	Report	Lienen 66'

Maine Road, Manchester
Attendance: 39,005
Referee: Alexis Ponnet (Belgium)

7 March 1979

Red Star Belgrade (Socialist Federal Republic of Yugoslavia)	1–0	(England) West Bromwich Albion
Savić 86'	Report

Red Star Stadium, Belgrade
Attendance: 84,470
Referee: Vojtech Christov (Czechoslovakia)

=== Second leg ===
21 March 1979

MSV Duisburg (West Germany)	1–2	(Hungary) Budapest Honvéd
Büssers 39'	Report	Karalyos 85'; Pal 88'

Wedaustadion, Duisburg
Attendance: 28,000
Referee: Nicolae Rainea (Romania)

4–4 on aggregate, MSV Duisburg won on away goals rule.

21 March 1979

Dukla Prague (Czechoslovakia)	1–2	(West Germany) Hertha BSC
Nehoda 21'	Report	Agerbeck 32'; Milewski 57'

Stadion Juliska, Prague
Attendance: 30,000
Referee: Ian Foote (Scotland)

Hertha BSC won 3–2 on aggregate.

20 March 1979

Borussia Mönchengladbach (West Germany)	3–1	(England) Manchester City
Kulik 45'; Bruns 52'; Del'Haye 71'	Report	Deyna 78'

Bökelbergstadion, Mönchengladbach
Attendance: 35,000
Referee: César Correia (Portugal)

Borussia Mönchengladbach won 4–2 on aggregate.

21 March 1979

West Bromwich Albion (England)	1–1	(Socialist Federal Republic of Yugoslavia) Red Star Belgrade
Regis 42'	Report	Savić 88'

The Hawthorns, Birmingham
Attendance: 31,110
Referee: Klaus Scheurell (East Germany)

Red Star Belgrade won 2–1 on aggregate.

== Semi-finals ==
Team 1	Agg.	Team 2	1st leg	2nd leg
MSV Duisburg (West Germany)	3–6	(West Germany) Borussia Mönchengladbach	2–2	1–4
Red Star Belgrade (Socialist Federal Republic of Yugoslavia)	2–2 (a)	(West Germany) Hertha BSC	1–0	1–2

=== First leg ===
10 April 1979

MSV Duisburg (West Germany)	2–2	(West Germany) Borussia Mönchengladbach
Worm 48'; Fruck 64'	Report	Simonsen 63'; Lausen 77'

Wedaustadion, Duisburg
Attendance: 22,500
Referee: Ulf Eriksson (Sweden)

11 April 1979

Red Star Belgrade (Socialist Federal Republic of Yugoslavia)	1–0	(West Germany) Hertha BSC
Savić 7'	Report

Red Star Stadium, Belgrade
Attendance: 71,923
Referee: Alexis Ponnet (Belgium)

=== Second leg ===
24 April 1979

Borussia Mönchengladbach (West Germany)	4–1	(West Germany) MSV Duisburg
Simonsen 43', 55'; Kulik 47'; Lienen 81'	Report	Büssers 70'

Bökelbergstadion, Mönchengladbach
Attendance: 14,800
Referee: Franz Wöhrer (Austria)

Borussia Mönchengladbach won 6–3 on aggregate.

25 April 1979

Hertha BSC (West Germany)	2–1	(Socialist Federal Republic of Yugoslavia) Red Star Belgrade
Beer 2'; Sidka 18'	Report	Šestić 74'

Olympiastadion, West Berlin
Attendance: 72,000
Referee: Riccardo Lattanzi (Italy)

2–2 on aggregate, Red Star Belgrade won on away goals rule.

== Final ==
=== First leg ===
9 May 1979
20:00

Red Star Belgrade (Socialist Federal Republic of Yugoslavia)	1–1	(West Germany) Borussia Mönchengladbach
Šestić 22'	Report	Jurišić 60' (o.g.)

Red Star Stadium, Belgrade
Attendance: 64,312
Referee: Ian Foote (Scotland)

=== Second leg ===
23 May 1979
20:15

Borussia Mönchengladbach (West Germany)	1–0	(Socialist Federal Republic of Yugoslavia) Red Star Belgrade
Simonsen 18' (pen.)	Report

Rheinstadion, Düsseldorf
Attendance: 45,000
Referee: Alberto Michelotti (Italy)

Borussia Mönchengladbach won 2–1 on aggregate.
