= 1981–82 European Cup Winners' Cup =

Tournament details
- Dates: 19 August 1981 – 12 May 1982
- Teams: 33

Final positions
- Champions: (Spain) Barcelona (2nd title)
- Runners-up: (Belgium) Standard Liège

Tournament statistics
- Matches played: 63
- Goals scored: 177 (2.81 per match)
- Attendance: 1,718,800 (27,283 per match)
- Top scorer(s): Ramaz Shengelia (Dinamo Tbilisi); Eddy Voordeckers (Standard Liège); 6 goals each

The 1981–82 European Cup Winners' Cup was the 22nd season of the UEFA Cup Winners' Cup, a club football competition organised by UEFA for the national cup winners from each of its member associations. Spanish club Barcelona won the title for a second time after beating Belgian side Standard Liège 2–1 in the final at Camp Nou.

== Preliminary round ==
Team 1	Agg.	Team 2	1st leg	2nd leg
Politehnica Timișoara (Romania)	2–5	(East Germany) Lokomotive Leipzig	2–0	0–5

=== First leg ===
19 August 1981

Politehnica Timișoara (Romania)	2–0	(East Germany) Lokomotive Leipzig
Anghel 19'; Nedelcu 28'	Report

Stadionul 1 Mai, Timișoara
Attendance: 18,000
Referee: Antonín Øezníček (Czechoslovakia)

=== Second leg ===
26 August 1981

Lokomotive Leipzig (East Germany)	5–0	(Romania) Politehnica Timișoara
Baum 22'; Moldt 34'; Zötzsche 62'; Kühn 89', 90'	Report

Zentralstadion, Leipzig
Attendance: 17,500
Referee: Josef Bucek (Austria)

Lokomotive Leipzig won 5–2 on aggregate.

== First round ==
Team 1	Agg.	Team 2	1st leg	2nd leg
Fram (Iceland)	2–5	(Republic of Ireland) Dundalk	2–1	0–4
Ajax (Netherlands)	1–6	(England) Tottenham Hotspur	1–3	0–3
SKA Rostov (Soviet Union)	5–0	(Turkey) Ankaragücü	3–0	2–0
Eintracht Frankfurt (West Germany)	2-2 (5-4p)	(Greece) PAOK	2–0	0–2 (aet)
Swansea City (Wales)	1–3	(East Germany) Lokomotive Leipzig	0–1	1–2
Jeunesse Esch (Luxembourg)	2–7	(Socialist Federal Republic of Yugoslavia) Velež Mostar	1–1	1–6
Dukla Prague (Czechoslovakia)	4–2	(Scotland) Rangers	3–0	1–2
Barcelona (Spain)	4–2	(Bulgaria) Botev Plovdiv	4–1	0–1
Vålerenga (Norway)	3–6	(Poland) Legia Warsaw	2–2	1–4
Lausanne (Switzerland)	4–4 (a)	(Sweden) Kalmar	2–1	2–3
KTP (Finland)	0–5	(France) Bastia	0–0	0–5
Dinamo Tbilisi (Soviet Union)	4–2	(Austria) GAK	2–0	2–2
Enosis Neon Paralimni (Cyprus)	1–8	(Hungary) Vasas	1–0	0–8
Floriana (Malta)	1–12	(Belgium) Standard Liège	1–3	0–9
Vejle (Denmark)	2–4	(Portugal) Porto	2–1	0–3
Ballymena United (Northern Ireland)	0–6	(Italy) Roma	0–2	0–4

=== First leg ===
16 September 1981

Fram (Iceland)	2–1	(Republic of Ireland) Dundalk
Torfason 65'; Steinsson 85'	Report	Fairclough 35'

Laugardalsvöllur, Reykjavík
Attendance: 1,802

16 September 1981

Ajax (Netherlands)	1–3	(England) Tottenham Hotspur
Lerby 68'	Report	Falco 19', 34'; Villa 67'

Olympisch Stadion, Amsterdam
Attendance: 21,954

16 September 1981

SKA Rostov (Soviet Union)	3–0	(Turkey) Ankaragücü
Zavarov 41', 56'; Andreyev 80'	Report

SKA SKVO Stadium, Rostov-on-Don
Attendance: 32,000

16 September 1981

Eintracht Frankfurt (West Germany)	2–0	(Greece) PAOK
Pezzey 12'; Körbel 78'	Report

Waldstadion, Frankfurt
Attendance: 20,500

16 September 1981

Swansea City (Wales)	0–1	(East Germany) Lokomotive Leipzig
	Report	Kinne 69'

Vetch Field, Swansea
Attendance: 10,295

15 September 1981

Jeunesse Esch (Luxembourg)	1–1	(Socialist Federal Republic of Yugoslavia) Velež Mostar
Scheitler 73'	Report	Mulahasanovic 88'

Stade de la Frontière, Esch-sur-Alzette
Attendance: 1,100

16 September 1981

Dukla Prague (Czechoslovakia)	3–0	(Scotland) Rangers
Rada 4'; Štambachr 33'; Nehoda 71'	Report

Stadion Juliska, Prague
Attendance: 12,000

16 September 1981

Barcelona (Spain)	4–1	(Bulgaria) Botev Plovdiv
Quini 25'; Simonsen 27', 77' (pen.); Schuster 37'	Report	Slavkov 82'

Camp Nou, Barcelona
Attendance: 30,300

16 September 1981

Vålerenga (Norway)	2–2	(Poland) Legia Warsaw
P. Jacobsen 35', 70'	Report	Majewski 43'; Okoński 61'

Bislett Stadium, Oslo
Attendance: 4,349

16 September 1981

Lausanne (Switzerland)	2–1	(Sweden) Kalmar
Parietti 7'; Kok 82'	Report	Magnusson 35'

Stade olympique de la Pontaise, Lausanne
Attendance: 6,400

16 September 1981

KTP (Finland)	0–0	(France) Bastia
	Report

Kotkan urheilukeskus, Kotka
Attendance: 4,107

16 September 1981

Dinamo Tbilisi (Soviet Union)	2–0	(Austria) GAK
Zhvania 42'; Shengelia 72' (pen.)	Report

Lenin Dinamo Stadium, Tbilisi
Attendance: 59,900

16 September 1981

Enosis Neon Paralimni (Cyprus)	1–0	(Hungary) Vasas
Goumenos 57'	Report

Paralimni Municipal Stadium, Paralimni
Attendance: 1,000
Referee: Hiqmet Kuka (Albania)

23 September 1981

Floriana (Malta)	1–3	(Belgium) Standard Liège
Aquilina 36'	Report	Meeuws 23'; Voordeckers 26'; Vandersmissen 30'

National Stadium, Ta' Qali
Attendance: 5,021

16 September 1981

Vejle (Denmark)	2–1	(Portugal) Porto
Andersen 29'; Eg 41' (pen.)	Report	Romeu 26'

Vejle Stadium, Vejle
Attendance: 4,400
Referee: Volker Roth (West Germany)

16 September 1981

Ballymena United (Northern Ireland)	0–2	(Italy) Roma
	Report	Chierico 63', 88'

Ballymena Showgrounds, Ballymena
Attendance: 3,500

=== Second leg ===
30 September 1981

Dundalk (Republic of Ireland)	4–0	(Iceland) Fram
Flanagan 4'; Fairclough 23'; M. Lawlor 49'; Duff 62'	Report

Oriel Park, Dundalk
Attendance: 3,500

30 September 1981

Tottenham Hotspur (England)	3–0	(Netherlands) Ajax
Galvin 69'; Falco 76'; Ardiles 81'	Report

White Hart Lane, London
Attendance: 34,606

Tottenham won 6–1 on aggregate.

30 September 1981

Ankaragücü (Turkey)	0–2	(Soviet Union) SKA Rostov
	Report	Andreyev 67'; Vorobyov 71'

Ankara 19 Mayıs Stadium, Ankara
Attendance: 30,000

30 September 1981

PAOK (Greece)	2–0	(West Germany) Eintracht Frankfurt
Kostikos 37', 63'	Report

Toumba Stadium, Thessaloniki
Attendance: 25,000

30 September 1981

Lokomotive Leipzig (East Germany)	2–1	(Wales) Swansea City
Kinne 14'; Moldt 22'	Report	Charles 79'

Zentralstadion, Leipzig
Attendance: 22,800

30 September 1981

Velež Mostar (Socialist Federal Republic of Yugoslavia)	6–1	(Luxembourg) Jeunesse Esch
Okuka 28', 37'; Skočajić 46'; Matijević 35', 86'; Bajević 67'	Report	Scheitler 81'

Stadion pod Bijelim Brijegom, Mostar
Attendance: 6,000

30 September 1981

Rangers (Scotland)	2–1	(Czechoslovakia) Dukla Prague
Bett 43'; MacDonald 44'	Report	Štambachr 24'

Ibrox Stadium, Glasgow
Attendance: 26,000

30 September 1981

Botev Plovdiv (Bulgaria)	1–0	(Spain) Barcelona
Slavkov 35'	Report

Stadion Deveti septemvri, Plovdiv
Attendance: 30,000

30 September 1981

Legia Warsaw (Poland)	4–1	(Norway) Vålerenga
Baran 1'; Adamczyk 6'; Topolski 36'; Miłoszewicz 90'	Report	Moen 38'

Stadion Wojska Polskiego, Warsaw
Attendance: 8,000

30 September 1981

Kalmar (Sweden)	3–2	(Switzerland) Lausanne
Persson 10'; Ohlsson-Nordenhem 35'; Ryf 42' (o.g.)	Report	Parietti 15'; Kok 62'

Fredriksskans, Kalmar
Attendance: 3,654

30 September 1981

Bastia (France)	5–0	(Finland) KTP
Cazes 23'; Ihily 30', 51'; Ponte 49'; Milla 87'	Report

Stade Armand-Cesari, Bastia
Attendance: 5,837

30 September 1981

GAK (Austria)	2–2	(Soviet Union) Dinamo Tbilisi
Riedl 64'; Schwicker 76'	Report	Shengelia 40', 63' (pen.)

Bundesstadion Liebenau, Graz
Attendance: 7,000

30 September 1981

Vasas (Hungary)	8–0	(Cyprus) Enosis Neon Paralimni
Várady 33', 70' (pen.), 84' (pen.); Kiss 60', 81'; Szebegyinszky 65'; Izsó 63', 81'	Report

Fáy utcai Stadion, Budapest
Attendance: 4,000
Referee: Jaromír Fausek (Czechoslovakia)

Vasas won 8–1 on aggregate.

1 October 1981

Standard Liège (Belgium)	9–0	(Malta) Floriana
Voordeckers 12', 29', 57'; Vandersmissen 32'; Plessers 42', 60'; Tahamata 65' (pen.); Haan 88'; Graf 89'	Report

Stade de Sclessin, Liège
Attendance: 7,500

30 September 1981

Porto (Portugal)	3–0	(Denmark) Vejle
Magalhães 37', 41'; Sousa 65'	Report

Estádio das Antas, Porto
Attendance: 45,000
Referee: Emilio Carlos Guruceta (Spain)

Porto won 3–2 on aggregate.

30 September 1981

Roma (Italy)	4–0	(Northern Ireland) Ballymena United
Spinosi 27'; Pruzzo 43', 50'; Giovannelli 55'	Report

Stadio Olimpico, Rome
Attendance: 24,318

== Second round ==
Team 1	Agg.	Team 2	1st leg	2nd leg
Dundalk (Republic of Ireland)	1–2	(England) Tottenham Hotspur	1–1	0–1
SKA Rostov (Soviet Union)	1–2	(West Germany) Eintracht Frankfurt	1–0	0–2
Lokomotive Leipzig (East Germany)	2-2 ((3-0p)	(Socialist Federal Republic of Yugoslavia) Velež Mostar	1–1	1–1 (aet)
Dukla Prague (Czechoslovakia)	1–4	(Spain) Barcelona	1–0	0–4
Legia Warsaw (Poland)	3–2	(Switzerland) Lausanne	2–1	1–1
Bastia (France)	2–4	(Soviet Union) Dinamo Tbilisi	1–1	1–3
Vasas (Hungary)	1–4	(Belgium) Standard Liège	0–2	1–2
Porto (Portugal)	2–0	(Italy) Roma	2–0	0–0

=== First leg ===
21 October 1981

Dundalk (Republic of Ireland)	1–1	(England) Tottenham Hotspur
Fairclough 82'	Report	Crooks 63'

Oriel Park, Dundalk
Attendance: 17,500

21 October 1981

SKA Rostov (Soviet Union)	1–0	(West Germany) Eintracht Frankfurt
Yashin 30'	Report

SKA SKVO Stadium, Rostov-on-Don
Attendance: 33,000

21 October 1981

Lokomotive Leipzig (East Germany)	1–1	(Socialist Federal Republic of Yugoslavia) Velež Mostar
Zötzsche 31' (pen.)	Report	Vukoje 47'

Bruno-Plache-Stadion, Leipzig
Attendance: 11,200

21 October 1981

Dukla Prague (Czechoslovakia)	1–0	(Spain) Barcelona
Kozák 14'	Report

Stadion Juliska, Prague
Attendance: 29,000

21 October 1981

Legia Warsaw (Poland)	2–1	(Switzerland) Lausanne
Adamczyk 8'; Baran 32'	Report	Kok 22'

Stadion Wojska Polskiego, Warsaw
Attendance: 12,000

21 October 1981

Bastia (France)	1–1	(Soviet Union) Dinamo Tbilisi
Milla 63'	Report	Gutsaev 36'

Stade Armand-Cesari, Bastia
Attendance: 4,629

21 October 1981

Vasas (Hungary)	0–2	(Belgium) Standard Liège
	Report	Tahamata 51', 59'

Fáy utcai Stadion, Budapest
Attendance: 4,007

21 October 1981

Porto (Portugal)	2–0	(Italy) Roma
Walsh 41'; Costa 46'	Report

Estádio das Antas, Porto
Attendance: 30,000
Referee: Adolf Prokop (East Germany)

=== Second leg ===
4 November 1981

Tottenham Hotspur (England)	1–0	(Republic of Ireland) Dundalk
Crooks 63'	Report

White Hart Lane, London
Attendance: 33,455

4 November 1981

Eintracht Frankfurt (West Germany)	2–0	(Soviet Union) SKA Rostov
Pezzey 3'; Lorant 39' (pen.)	Report

Waldstadion, Frankfurt
Attendance: 27,000

4 November 1981

Velež Mostar (Socialist Federal Republic of Yugoslavia)	1–1	(East Germany) Lokomotive Leipzig
Bajević 22'	Report	Zötzsche 72' (pen.)

Stadion pod Bijelim Brijegom, Mostar
Attendance: 13,000

4 November 1981

Barcelona (Spain)	4–0	(Czechoslovakia) Dukla Prague
Morán 3'; Sánchez 10'; Alexanko 39'; Schuster 83'	Report

Camp Nou, Barcelona
Attendance: 70,000

4 November 1981

Lausanne (Switzerland)	1–1	(Poland) Legia Warsaw
Lei-Ravello 85'	Report	Baran 48'

Stade olympique de la Pontaise, Lausanne
Attendance: 10,000

4 November 1981

Dinamo Tbilisi (Soviet Union)	3–1	(France) Bastia
Shengelia 15', 74'; Sulakvelidze 60'	Report	Milla 90'

Lenin Dinamo Stadium, Tbilisi
Attendance: 80,000

4 November 1981

Standard Liège (Belgium)	2–1	(Hungary) Vasas
Voordeckers 10', 84'	Report	Híres 67'

Stade de Sclessin, Liège
Attendance: 12,629

4 November 1981

Roma (Italy)	0–0	(Portugal) Porto
	Report

Stadio Olimpico, Rome
Attendance: 58,000
Referee: Károly Palotai (Hungary)

Porto won 2–0 on aggregate.

== Quarter-finals ==
Team 1	Agg.	Team 2	1st leg	2nd leg
Tottenham Hotspur (England)	3–2	(West Germany) Eintracht Frankfurt	2–0	1–2
Lokomotive Leipzig (East Germany)	2–4	(Spain) Barcelona	0–3	2–1
Legia Warsaw (Poland)	0–2	(Soviet Union) Dinamo Tbilisi	0–1	0–1
Standard Liège (Belgium)	4–2	(Portugal) Porto	2–0	2–2

=== First leg ===
3 March 1982

Tottenham Hotspur (England)	2–0	(West Germany) Eintracht Frankfurt
Miller 59'; Hazard 80'	Report

White Hart Lane, London
Attendance: 38,172

3 March 1982

Lokomotive Leipzig (East Germany)	0–3	(Spain) Barcelona
	Report	Quini 56'; Morán 85'; Simonsen 90'

Zentralstadion, Leipzig
Attendance: 68,500

3 March 1982

Legia Warsaw (Poland)	0–1	(Soviet Union) Dinamo Tbilisi
	Report	Sulakvelidze 9'

Stadion Wojska Polskiego, Warsaw
Attendance: 25,000

3 March 1982

Standard Liège (Belgium)	2–0	(Portugal) Porto
Englebert 30'; Gabriel 67' (o.g.)	Report

Stade de Sclessin, Liège
Attendance: 27,000
Referee: Rudolf Renggli (Switzerland)

=== Second leg ===
17 March 1982

Eintracht Frankfurt (West Germany)	2–1	(England) Tottenham Hotspur
Borchers 2'; Cha 15'	Report	Hoddle 80'

Waldstadion, Frankfurt
Attendance: 43,344

17 March 1982

Barcelona (Spain)	1–2	(East Germany) Lokomotive Leipzig
Morán 15'	Report	Kühn 41'; Bornschein 48'

Camp Nou, Barcelona
Attendance: 61,000

17 March 1982

Dinamo Tbilisi (Soviet Union)	1–0	(Poland) Legia Warsaw
Shengelia 30'	Report

Lenin Dinamo Stadium, Tbilisi
Attendance: 80,000

17 March 1982

Porto (Portugal)	2–2	(Belgium) Standard Liège
Jacques 58'; Walsh 70'	Report	Lecloux 45'; Vandersmissen 68'

Estádio das Antas, Porto
Attendance: 60,000
Referee: Brian McGinlay (Scotland)

Standard Liège won 4–2 on aggregate.

== Semi-finals ==
Team 1	Agg.	Team 2	1st leg	2nd leg
Tottenham Hotspur (England)	1–2	(Spain) Barcelona	1–1	0–1
Dinamo Tbilisi (Soviet Union)	0–2	(Belgium) Standard Liège	0–1	0–1

=== First leg ===
7 April 1982

Tottenham Hotspur (England)	1–1	(Spain) Barcelona
Roberts 85'	Report	Olmo 60'

White Hart Lane, London
Attendance: 41,555
Referee: Egbert Mulder (Netherlands)

7 April 1982

Dinamo Tbilisi (Soviet Union)	0–1	(Belgium) Standard Liège
	Report	Daerden 41'

Lenin Dinamo Stadium, Tbilisi
Attendance: 88,400

=== Second leg ===
21 April 1982

Standard Liège (Belgium)	1–0	(Soviet Union) Dinamo Tbilisi
Daerden 22'	Report

Stade de Sclessin, Liège
Attendance: 23,000

21 April 1982

Barcelona (Spain)	1–0	(England) Tottenham Hotspur
Simonsen 46'	Report

Camp Nou, Barcelona
Attendance: 80,000

== Final ==
12 May 1982

Barcelona (Spain)	2–1	(Belgium) Standard Liège
Simonsen 45+2'; Quini 63'	Report	Vandersmissen 8'

Camp Nou, Barcelona
Attendance: 100,066
Referee: Walter Eschweiler (West Germany)

== Top scorers ==
Rank	Name	Team	Goals
1	(Belgium) Eddy Voordeckers	(Belgium) Standard Liège	6
1	(Soviet Union) Ramaz Shengelia	(Soviet Union) Dinamo Tbilisi	6
3	(Denmark) Allan Simonsen	(Spain) Barcelona	5
4	(Belgium) Guy Vandersmissen	(Belgium) Standard Liège	4
5	(Hungary) Béla Várady	(Hungary) Vasas	3
5	(England) Mark Falco	(England) Tottenham Hotspur	3
5	(Republic of Ireland) Mick Fairclough	(Republic of Ireland) Dundalk	3
5	(Spain) Enrique Morán	(Spain) Barcelona	3
5	(Spain) Quini	(Spain) Barcelona	3
5	(Cameroon) Roger Milla	(France) Bastia	3
5	(Netherlands) Robert Kok	(Switzerland) Lausanne	3
5	(Poland) Janusz Baran	(Poland) Legia Warsaw	3
5	(East Germany) Dieter Kühn	(East Germany) Lokomotive Leipzig	3
5	(East Germany) Uwe Zötzsche	(East Germany) Lokomotive Leipzig	3
5	(Netherlands) Simon Tahamata	(Belgium) Standard Liège	3

== See also ==
- 1981–82 European Cup
- 1981–82 UEFA Cup
