= 1977–78 DDR-Oberliga =

DDR-Oberliga
- Season: 1977–78
- Champions: Dynamo Dresden
- Relegated: FC Vorwärts Frankfurt; BSG Wismut Gera
- European Cup: Dynamo Dresden
- European Cup Winners' Cup: 1. FC Magdeburg
- UEFA Cup: BFC Dynamo; 1. FC Lokomotive Leipzig; FC Carl Zeiss Jena
- Matches: 182
- Goals: 528 (2.9 per match)
- Top goalscorer: Klaus Havenstein (15)
- Total attendance: 2,132,300
- Average attendance: 11,716

The 1977–78 DDR-Oberliga was the 29th season of the DDR-Oberliga, the first tier of league football in East Germany.

The league was contested by fourteen teams. Dynamo Dresden won the championship, the club's sixth of eight East German championships, thereby equalling FC Vorwärts Berlin's record.

Klaus Havenstein of BSG Chemie Böhlen was the league's top scorer with 15 goals, while Jürgen Croy of BSG Sachsenring Zwickau won the seasons East German Footballer of the year award for a record third time.

On the strength of the 1977–78 title Dresden qualified for the 1978–79 European Cup where the club was knocked out by FK Austria Wien in the quarter-finals. Second-placed club 1. FC Magdeburg qualified for the 1978–79 European Cup Winners' Cup as the seasons FDGB-Pokal winners and was knocked out by Baník Ostrava in the quarter-finals. For the first time three East German clubs qualified for the 1978–79 UEFA Cup with third-placed BFC Dynamo being knocked out in the first round by Red Star Belgrade while fourth-placed 1. FC Lokomotive Leipzig lost to Arsenal, also in the first round and fifth-placed FC Carl Zeiss Jena was defeated by MSV Duisburg in the second round.

== Table ==
The 1977–78 season saw two newly promoted clubs BSG Chemie Böhlen and BSG Wismut Gera.

Pos	Team	Pld	W	D	L	GF	GA	GD	Pts	Qualification or relegation
1	SG Dynamo Dresden (C)	26	18	5	3	70	25	+45	41	Qualification to European Cup first round
2	1. FC Magdeburg	26	16	6	4	52	17	+35	38	Qualification to Cup Winners' Cup first round
3	BFC Dynamo	26	14	7	5	54	25	+29	35	Qualification to UEFA Cup first round
4	1. FC Lokomotive Leipzig	26	13	6	7	57	34	+23	32	Qualification to UEFA Cup first round
5	FC Carl Zeiss Jena	26	13	5	8	53	32	+21	31	Qualification to UEFA Cup first round
6	Hallescher FC Chemie	26	11	8	7	44	34	+10	30	
7	FC Karl-Marx-Stadt	26	6	12	8	34	37	−3	24	
8	1. FC Union Berlin	26	9	6	11	27	36	−9	24	
9	FC Rot-Weiss Erfurt	26	7	9	10	23	35	−12	23	
10	BSG Sachsenring Zwickau	26	8	7	11	22	45	−23	23	
11	BSG Wismut Aue	26	8	6	12	22	47	−25	22	
12	BSG Chemie Böhlen	26	6	8	12	34	51	−17	20	
13	FC Vorwärts Frankfurt (R)	26	3	9	14	19	35	−16	15	Relegation to DDR-Liga
14	BSG Wismut Gera (R)	26	1	4	21	17	75	−58	6	Relegation to DDR-Liga

(C) Champions; (R) Relegated

== Results ==
Home \ Away	BFC	CZJ	CHB	DRE	HFC	KMS	LOK	MAG	RWE	SZW	UNI	VFO	AUE	WGE
BFC Dynamo		3–0	2–1	2–2	2–2	2–2	2–0	2–3	1–1	5–1	1–0	4–1	3–0	4–0
Carl Zeiss Jena	2–0		2–1	4–3	6–1	2–1	0–1	1–1	5–2	0–0	1–0	2–2	6–0	5–1
Chemie Böhlen	1–0	1–4		1–1	5–3	2–2	2–3	1–0	1–1	2–2	4–1	0–0	2–0	3–1
Dynamo Dresden	1–2	2–0	7–1		2–1	4–2	5–1	1–0	6–0	5–0	4–1	1–0	4–1	2–1
Hallescher FC Chemie	0–0	1–2	4–0	0–0		3–1	1–0	2–1	3–0	2–0	1–2	2–2	6–0	4–2
Karl-Marx-Stadt	0–0	1–1	3–1	0–4	1–1		1–1	0–0	1–1	1–0	0–0	3–1	4–0	1–1
Lokomotive Leipzig	4–1	0–0	6–1	2–2	2–0	2–0		0–2	2–1	7–0	0–1	3–1	4–1	4–0
1. FC Magdeburg	2–1	4–1	2–1	2–0	2–0	5–0	3–3		2–0	6–0	1–2	1–0	0–0	2–0
Rot-Weiß Erfurt	1–2	2–1	0–0	0–2	1–1	1–0	2–2	0–2		4–0	2–0	1–0	0–0	1–0
Sachsenring Zwickau	0–0	2–0	2–0	0–3	2–3	0–0	2–0	1–2	2–0		1–1	1–0	0–0	1–0
Union Berlin	0–2	1–0	1–1	0–2	1–1	3–3	1–3	0–4	0–1	1–0		1–0	1–0	2–0
Vorwärts Frankfurt (Oder)	1–3	0–2	1–0	1–2	0–0	1–2	0–0	1–1	0–0	0–1	1–1		2–1	2–0
Wismut Aue	0–4	1–0	2–1	1–1	0–1	1–0	4–2	0–0	2–1	1–1	3–2	1–0		1–2
Wismut Gera	0–6	1–6	1–1	2–4	0–1	0–5	1–5	0–4	0–0	2–3	0–4	2–2	0–2	

Legend: Blue = home team win; Yellow = draw; Red = away team win.

== Attendances ==
No.	Club	Average
1	Dynamo Dresden	30,231
2	1. FC Union	17,308
3	Hallescher	17,038
4	Magdeburg	14,115
5	BFC Dynamo	13,154
6	Lokomotive Leipzig	12,462
7	Karl-Marx-Stadt	11,438
8	Carl Zeiss Jena	8,538
9	Wismut Aue	8,231
10	Erfurt	7,577
11	Sachsenring Zwickau	7,346
12	Wismut Gera	6,785
13	Chemie Böhlen	5,454
14	Vorwärts Frankfurt	4,385
