= 1978–79 NK Hajduk Split season =

Hajduk Split
1978–79 season
- Chairman: Tito Kirigin
- Manager: Tomislav Ivić
- First League: 1st
- Yugoslav Cup: First round
- UEFA Cup: Second round
- Top goalscorer: League: Slaviša Žungul (12); All: Slaviša Žungul (13)
- Highest home attendance: 31,000 v Red Star, 27 August 1978
- Lowest home attendance: 2,500 v Radnički Niš, 28 October 1978

The 1978–79 season was the 64th season in Hajduk Split's history and their 33rd season in the Yugoslav First League. Their 3rd-place finish in the 1977–78 season meant it was their 33rd successive season playing in the Yugoslav First League.

== Competitions ==
=== Overall ===
Competition	Started round	Final result	First match	Last Match
1978–79 Yugoslav First League	–	1st	13 August	17 June
1978–79 Yugoslav Cup	First round		30 August	
1978–79 UEFA Cup	First round	Second round	13 September	1 November

=== Yugoslav First League ===
==== Classification ====
Pos	Team	Pld	W	D	L	GF	GA	GD	Pts	Qualification or relegation
1	Hajduk Split (C)	34	20	10	4	62	28	+34	50	Qualification for European Cup first round
2	Dinamo Zagreb	34	21	8	5	67	38	+29	50	Qualification for UEFA Cup first round
3	Red Star Belgrade	34	16	9	9	51	33	+18	41	Qualification for UEFA Cup first round
4	Sarajevo	34	17	5	12	56	53	+3	39	
5	Velež	34	15	8	11	50	41	+9	38	

Source: rsssf.org
Rules for classification: 1) points; 2) goal difference; 3) number of goals scored.
(C) Champions

==== Results summary ====
Overall								Home						Away					
Pld	W	D	L	GF	GA	GD	Pts	W	D	L	GF	GA	GD	W	D	L	GF	GA	GD
34	20	10	4	60	28	+32	70	15	1	1	38	8	+30	5	9	3	22	20	+2

==== Results by round ====
Round	1	2	3	4	5	6	7	8	9	10	11	12	13	14	15	16	17	18	19	20	21	22	23	24	25	26	27	28	29	30	31	32	33	34
Ground	A	H	A	H	A	H	A	A	H	A	H	A	H	A	H	A	H	H	A	H	A	H	A	H	H	A	H	A	H	A	H	A	H	A
Result	D	W	D	W	L	W	W	D	W	D	W	L	W	L	W	D	W	W	W	W	W	W	D	W	W	D	L	W	W	D	W	D	W	W
Position	8	10	9	7	10	5	3	3	3	2	2	2	2	5	3	3	1	1	1	1	1	1	1	1	1	1	1	1	1	1	1	1	1	1

Source: Competitive matches
A = Away; H = Home; W = Win; D = Draw; L = Loss

== Matches ==
=== First League ===
Round	Date	Venue	Opponent	Score	Attendance	Hajduk Scorers
1	13 Aug	A	NK Zagreb	1–1	25,000	Šurjak
2	20 Aug	H	Sloboda	1–1	20,000	Jovanić
3	23 Aug	A	Partizan	2–2	50,000	Đorđević, Zl. Vujović
4	27 Aug	H	Red Star	1–0	31,000	Žungul
5	3 Sep	A	Budućnost	1–2	16,000	Žungul
6	9 Sep	H	Napredak Kruševac	4–0	15,000	Čop (2), Jovanić, Žungul
7	17 Sep	A	Olimpija	2–1	16,000	Krstičević, Zl. Vujović
8	23 Sep	A	OFK Beograd	0–0	8,000	
9	8 Oct	H	Željezničar	3–2	18,000	Žungul (2), Primorac
10	14 Oct	A	Dinamo Zagreb	2–2	45,000	Đorđević, Žungul
11	28 Oct	H	Radnički Niš	2–1	2,500	Luketin, Žungul
12	5 Nov	A	Borac Banja Luka	2–3	10,000	Zl. Vujović, Šurjak
13	12 Nov	H	Osijek	1–0	10,000	Žungul
14	19 Nov	A	Velež	0–1	22,000	
15	26 Nov	H	Vojvodina	2–0	15,000	Žungul, Krstičević
16	29 Nov	A	Rijeka	2–2	8,000	Žungul, Primorac
17	3 Dec	H	Sarajevo	5–0	20,000	Žungul (2), Zl. Vujović, Krstičević, Primorac
18	4 Mar	H	NK Zagreb	1–0	20,000	Šurjak
19	10 Mar	A	Sloboda	2–1	4,000	Zl. Vujović (2)
20	18 Mar	H	Partizan	2–0	30,000	Šurjak, Zl. Vujović
21	25 Mar	A	Red Star	3–1	45,000	Đorđević, Zo. Vujović, Zl. Vujović
22	8 Apr	H	Budućnost	1–0	25,000	Primorac
23	15 Apr	A	Napredak Kruševac	0–0	18,000	
24	22 Apr	H	Olimpija	3–0	18,000	Krstičević, Zl. Vujović, Primorac
25	29 Apr	H	OFK Beograd	3–0	18,000	Krstičević, Primorac, Zo. Vujović
26	6 May	A	Željezničar	2–2	18,000	Primorac, Šurjak
27	9 May	H	Dinamo Zagreb	1–2	30,000	Primorac
28	13 May	A	Radnički Niš	2–0	12,000	Boljat, Zo. Vujović
29	19 May	H	Borac Banja Luka	3–1	7,500	Primorac, Šalov, Zl. Vujović
30	27 May	A	Osijek	1–1	12,000	Primorac
31	30 May	H	Velež	3–0	16,000	Krstičević, Šurjak, Luketin
32	3 Jun	A	Vojvodina	0–0	18,000	
33	10 Jun	H	Rijeka	2–1	12,000	Krstičević, Luketin
34	17 Jun	A	Sarajevo	2–1	30,000	Đorđević, Zo. Vujović

Source: hajduk.hr

=== Yugoslav Cup ===
Round	Date	Venue	Opponent	Score	Attendance	Hajduk Scorers
R1	30 Aug	H	Proleter Zrenjanin	2–2 (5 – 6 p)	6,000	Primorac (2)

Sources: hajduk.hr

=== UEFA Cup ===
Round	Date	Venue	Opponent	Score	Attendance	Hajduk Scorers
R1	13 Sep	H	Rapid Wien (Austria)	2–0	25,000	Čop, Luketin
R1	27 Sep	A (Austria)	Rapid Wien (Austria)	1–2	25,000	Žungul
R2	17 Oct	H	Arsenal (England)	2–1	30,000	Čop, Đorđević
R2	1 Nov	A (England)	Arsenal (England)	0–1	41,787	

Source: hajduk.hr

== Player seasonal records ==
=== Top scorers ===
Rank	Name	League	Europe	Cup	Total
1	(Socialist Federal Republic of Yugoslavia) Slaviša Žungul	12	–	1	13
2	(Socialist Federal Republic of Yugoslavia) Boro Primorac	10	2	–	12
3	(Socialist Federal Republic of Yugoslavia) Zlatko Vujović	10	–	–	10
4	(Socialist Federal Republic of Yugoslavia) Mišo Krstičević	7	–	–	7
5	(Socialist Federal Republic of Yugoslavia) Ivica Šurjak	6	–	–	6
6	(Socialist Federal Republic of Yugoslavia) Boriša Đorđević	4	–	1	5
7	(Socialist Federal Republic of Yugoslavia) Davor Čop	2	2	–	4
7	(Socialist Federal Republic of Yugoslavia) Šime Luketin	3	1	–	4
7	(Socialist Federal Republic of Yugoslavia) Zoran Vujović	4	–	–	4
10	(Socialist Federal Republic of Yugoslavia) Mićun Jovanić	2	–	–	2
11	(Socialist Federal Republic of Yugoslavia) Mario Boljat	1	–	–	1
11	(Socialist Federal Republic of Yugoslavia) Nenad Šalov	1	–	–	1
	TOTALS	62	5	2	69

Source: Competitive matches

== See also ==
- 1978–79 Yugoslav First League
- 1978–79 Yugoslav Cup

== External sources ==
- 1978–79 Yugoslav First League at rsssf.com
- 1978–79 Yugoslav Cup at rsssf.com
- 1978–79 UEFA Cup at rsssf.com
- 1978–79 Yugoslav First League at historical-lineups.com
