= Allan Simonsen =

Danish footballer and manager (born 1952)

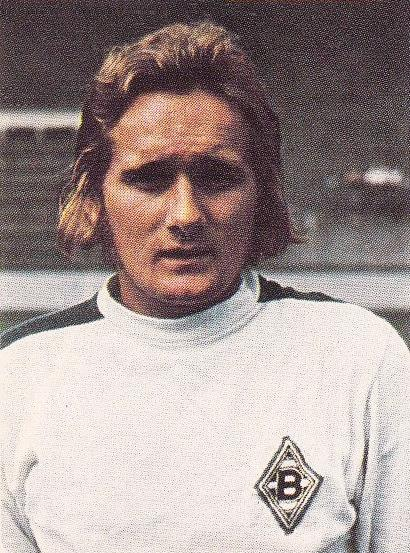
- Simonsen in 1976

Personal information
- Full name: Allan Rodenkam Simonsen
- Date of birth: 15 December 1952 (age 73)
- Place of birth: Vejle, Denmark
- Height: 1.65 m (5 ft 5 in)
- Positions: Striker; right winger

Senior career*
Years	Team	Apps	(Gls)
1971–1972	Vejle	42	(16)
1972–1979	Borussia Mönchengladbach	178	(76)
1979–1982	Barcelona	98	(31)
1982–1983	Charlton Athletic	16	(9)
1983–1989	Vejle	166	(70)
Total		500	(202)

International career
1971–1972	Denmark U-21	6	(0)
1972–1986	Denmark	55	(20)

Managerial career
- 1991–1994: Vejle
- 1994–2001: Faroe Islands
- 2001–2004: Luxembourg
- 2011–2013: Fredericia (General manager)
- 2013: Fredericia (caretaker)
- * Club domestic league appearances and goals

Allan Rodenkam Simonsen (born 15 December 1952) is a Danish former footballer and manager. He most prominently played as a striker for German Bundesliga club Borussia Mönchengladbach, winning the 1975 and 1979 UEFA Cups, as well as for Barcelona in Spain, winning the 1982 Cup Winners' Cup. Simonsen is the only footballer to have scored in the European Cup, UEFA Cup, and Cup Winners' Cup finals. Simonsen was named 1977 European Footballer of the Year.

For the Denmark national team, Simonsen was capped 55 times, scoring 20 goals. He represented Denmark at the 1972 Summer Olympics, 1984 European Championship and 1986 World Cup tournaments. He was voted into the Danish Football Hall of Fame in November 2008.

== Club career ==
=== Vejle ===
Born in Vejle, Simonsen started playing football with Vejle FC, before he joined the youth team of local top-flight club Vejle BK (VB) in 1963. He made his senior debut for VB on 24 March 1971 in a 3–1 home win against Karlskoga FF. He won the 1971 and 1972 Danish championship with the club, as well as the 1972 Danish Cup to complete The Double. Following an impressive three goals in six matches at the 1972 Summer Olympics, Simonsen moved to Germany to play professionally for defending German Bundesliga champions Borussia Mönchengladbach.

=== Borussia Mönchengladbach ===
In his first two seasons with Borussia Mönchengladbach, Simonsen had a hard time, as he only played a combined 17 games and scored two goals. However, he was part of the team which won the 1972–73 German Cup trophy. He broke into the starting line-up for the 1974–75 season. He played all 34 games of the season, and scored 18 goals as Mönchengladbach won the Bundesliga championship. Simonsen also scored ten goals in 12 games in the international 1974–75 UEFA Cup competition, including two goals in the 5–1 final victory against Twente. In the following season, Simonsen scored 16 goals as Mönchengladbach regained the Bundesliga in the 1975–76 season. He scored four goals in six games of the international 1975–76 European Cup competition, before Mönchengladbach were eliminated in the quarter-finals by Spanish team Real Madrid on the away goals rule.

1977 was the greatest year in Simonsen's career. In the 1976–77 European Cup, Simonsen helped Mönchengladbach to the 1977 European Cup Final against English team Liverpool. In the final, Simonsen scored a memorable goal from a powerful shot to level the game at 1–1, but Mönchengladbach eventually lost 3–1. He was subsequently named the 1977 European Footballer of the Year, becoming the first Danish player to win that award. The race was tight, Simonsen edged past English forward Kevin Keegan by three points and French midfielder Michel Platini by four points to win the prestigious prize. The win was notable in that Simonsen's native Denmark was not among the top footballing nations in the 1970s, leaving little room for him to impress at the international tournaments.

In the following two Bundesliga seasons, Simonsen continued his prolific goalscoring, as Mönchengladbach finished second and eighth respectively. He won another international trophy with Mönchengladbach in 1979, when he scored eight goals in eight games to guide the club to the final games of the 1978–79 UEFA Cup. He scored the deciding goal in the 2–1 1979 UEFA Cup Final win against Red Star Belgrade. Simonsen had been approached by Spanish club Barcelona in 1978, but Mönchengladbach refused to let him go. Instead, Simonsen waited for his contract to expire and moved to Barcelona in 1979, rejecting offers from Hamburger SV, Juventus, and several Arabian clubs.

=== Barcelona ===
Simonsen spent three successful seasons with Barcelona. In his first Barcelona season, Simonsen was the top goal scorer of the team with ten goals in 32 games, as Barcelona finished in fourth place in the 1979–80 La Liga season. The following season saw several new players at Barcelona, and the club won the 1981 Copa del Rey. Simonsen's ten goals saw him as third top goalscorer behind new players Quini (20) and Bernd Schuster (11), as Barcelona finished in fifth place in the 1980–81 La Liga season. Simonsen was second goal scorer behind Quini, as the club finished second in the 1981–82 La Liga season. He also helped Barcelona reach the final of the continental 1981–82 European Cup Winners' Cup competition. In the 2–1 final victory against Standard Liège, Simonsen scored the deciding goal on a header to help Barcelona lift the trophy.

=== Charlton Athletic ===
When Barcelona signed Argentinian forward Diego Maradona in 1982, Spanish league restrictions meant Simonsen was to compete with Maradona and Bernd Schuster for only two places allowed for foreign players in each starting line-up. Simonsen saw it as a personal insult, and asked Barcelona for his contract to be annulled. He made a shock move to English Second Division side Charlton Athletic for £300,000 in October 1982. He rejected offers from Real Madrid and Tottenham Hotspur, in order to play for a club with less stress and attention. Despite scoring nine times in 16 appearances, the club had trouble funding his transfer and wages after three months, and he was put up for sale. His £1,300 per week wages had not been paid, and as a result, he was free to leave the club for nothing. Simonsen then chose to return to his childhood club VB in 1983.

=== Return to Vejle ===
He missed the last half of the 1984 season for VB because of an injury he sustained at the 1984 European Championship, but the club managed to win the 1984 Danish championship without him. He returned as a profile of the top-flight Danish 1st Division, but never reached his former form. Simonsen retired from football in 1989 at age 37, and played his last game for VB in November 1989. He played a total 282 games and scored 104 goals, including 208 games and 89 goals in the league, for Vejle Boldklub.

== International career ==
Simonsen debuted for the Danish national team under manager Rudi Strittich in the July 1972 friendly match against Iceland. He scored two goals as Denmark won 5–2, and Simonsen was included in the Danish squad for the 1972 Summer Olympics. At the Olympics, he scored three goals in the first three matches to help Denmark advance beyond the first group stage. In the second group stage, Simonsen ran out of steam and he was substituted at half time in two of the last three games as Denmark were eliminated.

He played a crucial part for the Danish national team under manager Sepp Piontek, in Denmark's qualifying campaign for the 1984 European Championship. Denmark trailed England in their qualifying group by a single point with a game in hand before the two teams met at England's home ground Wembley Stadium in September 1983. Simonsen scored one of the most important Danish goals ever in this game, as he converted a penalty kick against English goalkeeper Peter Shilton. The 1–0 win eventually secured the Danish national team qualification for their first international tournament since the 1972 Olympic Games, and the first European Championship participation since the 1964 tournament. It effectively ended England's hopes of qualification for the tournament, as was confirmed by Denmark's later victory against Greece. Simonsen subsequently finished third in the vote for the 1983 European Footballer of the Year award.

The 1984 European Championship main tournament was a short experience for Simonsen, as he broke his leg in a challenge by Yvon Le Roux in Denmark's first match against France. Even without Simonsen, Denmark reached the semi-finals. He was once more a part of the Danish national team at the 1986 World Cup, Denmark's first World Cup participation. He only played a single match at the tournament, coming on as a substitute against West Germany, as younger players had surpassed him. He played a farewell match against Germany in September 1986 before ending his national team career.

Simonsen played a total 55 games for the Danish national team and scored 20 goals, according to the Danish Football Association. However, some sources chose to include Simonsen's appearance in a February 1981 charity match, to tally his national team career as 21 goals in 56 games. The match was Italy vs. Europe for the benefit of the Irpinia earthquake victims. Simonsen started the game, scored a goal, and was substituted at half time as Europe won 3–0.

== Style of play ==
Simonsen predominantly played on the right wing or as a second striker. He is widely regarded as one of the best right wingers in the history of the Bundesliga.

== Managerial career ==
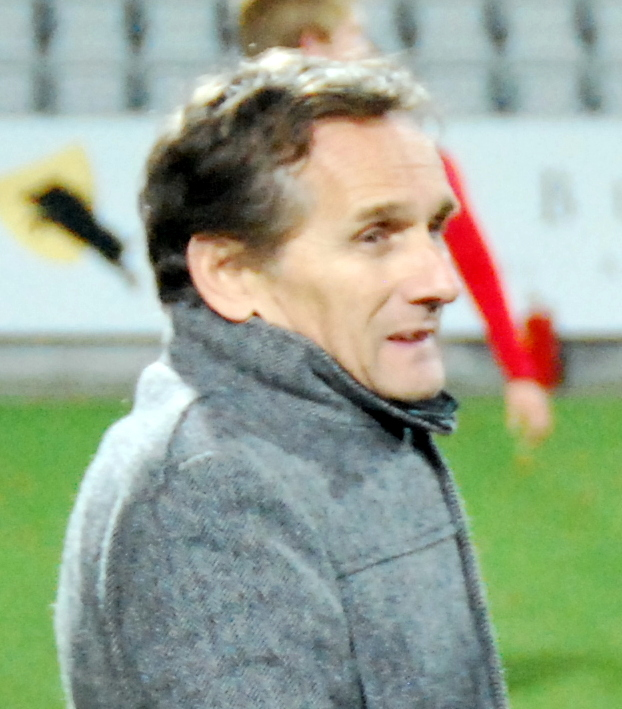
Simonsen in 2012

Following his retirement, Simonsen went on to coach his former club Vejle Boldklub from 1991 to 1994. During his time at the club, VB were relegated from the new top-flight Danish Superliga to the now second-tier Danish 1st Division. He later coached the national teams of the Faroe Islands from 1994 to 2001 and Luxembourg from 2001 to 2004.

In 2011, he became General Manager of the Danish 1st Division team Fredericia. When Fredericia sacked manager Thomas Thomasberg on 8 April 2013, Simonsen and Steen Thychosen took charge of the team as caretaker managers. At the end of the 2012–13 season, Simonsen left both his positions at Fredericia.

== Career statistics ==
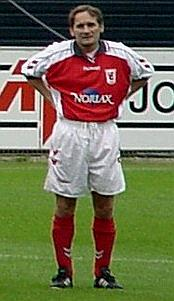
Simonsen in a Vejle BK jersey in 2000

=== Club ===
Appearances and goals by club, season and competition
Club	Season	League			National Cup		League Cup		Continental		Other		Total	
Club	Season	Division	Apps	Goals	Apps	Goals	Apps	Goals	Apps	Goals	Apps	Goals	Apps	Goals
Vejle	1969-1970	Danish First Division	6	4	1	0	-		-		-		7	4
Vejle	1970-1971	Danish First Division	13	6	2	0	-		-		-		15	6
Vejle	1971-1972	Danish First Division	16	9	5	1	-		-		-		21	10
Vejle	1972-1973	Danish First Division	20	14	3	2	-		2	0	1	0	26	16
Vejle	Total		55	33	11	3	-		2	0	1	0	69	36
Borussia Mönchengladbach	1972–73	Bundesliga	8	0	2	0	3	0	2	0	-		15	0
Borussia Mönchengladbach	1973–74	Bundesliga	9	2	2	0	0	0	3	3	-		14	5
Borussia Mönchengladbach	1974–75	Bundesliga	34	18	2	1	-		12	10	-		48	29
Borussia Mönchengladbach	1975–76	Bundesliga	34	16	4	2	-		6	4	-		44	22
Borussia Mönchengladbach	1976–77	Bundesliga	34	12	1	0	-		9	5	-		45	17
Borussia Mönchengladbach	1977–78	Bundesliga	31	17	5	3	-		6	5	-		42	25
Borussia Mönchengladbach	1978–79	Bundesliga	28	11	3	3	-		10	9	-		41	23
Borussia Mönchengladbach	Total		178	76	19	9	3	0	48	36	-		249	121
Barcelona	1979–80	La Liga	32	10	2	0	0	0	5	4	-		41	14
Barcelona	1980–81	La Liga	33	10	9	2	0	0	2	0	-		44	12
Barcelona	1981–82	La Liga	33	11	2	1	0	0	9	5	-		44	17
Barcelona	Total		98	31	13	3	-		16	9	-		129	43
Charlton Athletic	1982–83	Second Division	16	9	2	4	1	2	-		-		19	15
Charlton Athletic	Total		16	9	2	4	1	2	-		-		19	15
Vejle	1983	First Division	28	13	5	7	-		-		3	1	37	21
Vejle	1984	First Division	13	6	4	3	-		-		1	1	18	10
Vejle	1985	First Division	30	16	3	4	-		-		4	4	37	24
Vejle	1986	First Division	24	13	3	2	-		2	1	3	0	30	16
Vejle	1987	First Division	25	13	3	4	-		-		2	2	30	19
Vejle	1988	First Division	23	4	5	3	-		-		5	4	33	11
Vejle	1989	First Division	23	5	5	2	-		-		4	1	32	6
Vejle	Total		166	70	28	25	-		2	1	22	13	217	107
Career total			458	186	73	44	4	2	68	46	23	13	683	323

=== International ===
Appearances and goals by national team and year
National team	Year	Apps	Goals
Denmark	1972	9	5
Denmark	1973	0	0
Denmark	1974	2	1
Denmark	1975	1	0
Denmark	1976	2	1
Denmark	1977	2	2
Denmark	1978	1	1
Denmark	1979	4	1
Denmark	1980	5	2
Denmark	1981	7	3
Denmark	1982	1	0
Denmark	1983	7	4
Denmark	1984	6	0
Denmark	1985	4	0
Denmark	1986	4	0
Total		55	20

Scores and results list Denmark's goal tally first, score column indicates score after each Simonsen goal.

List of international goals scored by Allan Simonsen
No.	Date	Venue	Opponent	Score	Result	Competition
1	3 July 1972	Laugardalsvöllur, Reykjavík, Iceland	Iceland	2–2	5–2	Friendly
2	3 July 1972	Laugardalsvöllur, Reykjavík, Iceland	Iceland	4–2	5–2	Friendly
3	27 August 1972	Drei Flüsse Stadion, Passau, Germany	Brazil	1–0	3–2	1972 Summer Olympics
4	27 August 1972	Drei Flüsse Stadion, Passau, Germany	Brazil	3–2	3–2	1972 Summer Olympics
5	29 August 1972	Rosenaustadion, Augsburg, Germany	Iran	2–0	4–0	1972 Summer Olympics
6	3 September 1974	Idrætsparken, Copenhagen, Denmark	Indonesia	4–0	9–0	Friendly
7	23 May 1976	Tsirion Stadium, Limassol, Cyprus	Cyprus	1–1	5–1	1978 World Cup qualification
8	1 May 1977	Idrætsparken, Copenhagen, Denmark	Poland	1–1	1–2	1978 World Cup qualification
9	15 June 1977	Idrætsparken, Copenhagen, Denmark	Sweden	2–1	2–1	1972–77 Nordic Championship
10	20 September 1978	Idrætsparken, Copenhagen, Denmark	England	1–2	3–4	1980 European Championship qualification
11	6 June 1979	Idrætsparken, Copenhagen, Denmark	Northern Ireland	3–0	4–0	1980 European Championship qualification
12	21 May 1980	Idrætsparken, Copenhagen, Denmark	Spain	1–1	2–2	Friendly
13	19 November 1980	Idrætsparken, Copenhagen, Denmark	Luxembourg	4–0	4–0	1982 World Cup qualification
14	15 April 1981	Idrætsparken, Copenhagen, Denmark	Romania	1–1	2–1	Friendly
15	26 August 1981	Idrætsparken, Copenhagen, Denmark	Iceland	2–0	3–0	Friendly
16	26 August 1981	Idrætsparken, Copenhagen, Denmark	Iceland	3–0	3–0	Friendly
17	1 June 1983	Idrætsparken, Copenhagen, Denmark	Hungary	3–1	3–1	1984 European Championship qualification
18	21 September 1983	Wembley Stadium, London, UK	England	1–0	1–0	1984 European Championship qualification
19	12 October 1983	Idrætsparken, Copenhagen, Denmark	Luxembourg	4–0	6–0	1984 European Championship qualification
20	16 November 1983	Olympic Stadium, Athens, Greece	Greece	2–0	2–0	1984 European Championship qualification

== Managerial statistics ==
Updated 16 June 2016

Team	From	To	Record				
Team	From	To	G	W	D	L	Win %
Faroe Islands	1994	2001	52	8	7	37	15.38
Luxembourg	13 February 2002	17 November 2004	27	0	4	23	0.00

== Honours ==
Vejle

- Danish championship: 1971, 1972, 1984
- Danish Cup: 1972

Borussia Mönchengladbach

- Bundesliga: 1974–75, 1975–76, 1976–77
- DFB-Pokal: 1972–73
- DFL-Supercup: 1977
- UEFA Cup: 1974–75, 1978–79; runner-up: 1972–73
- European Cup runner-up: 1976–77

Barcelona

- Copa del Rey: 1980–81
- UEFA Cup Winners' Cup: 1981–82

Individual

- Ballon d'Or: 1977
- Onze de Bronze: 1977
- kicker Bundesliga Team of the Season: 1974–75, 1975–76, 1976–77
- Sport Ideal European XI: 1977
- European Cup Top Scorer: 1977–78
- UEFA Cup Top Scorer: 1978–79
- La Liga Team of The Year: 1982
- Danish Football Hall of Fame

== See also ==
- List of Danish sportspeople

Awards
Preceded by Franz Beckenbauer	European Footballer of the Year; 1977	Succeeded by Kevin Keegan
