= Doru Nicolae =

Romanian footballer

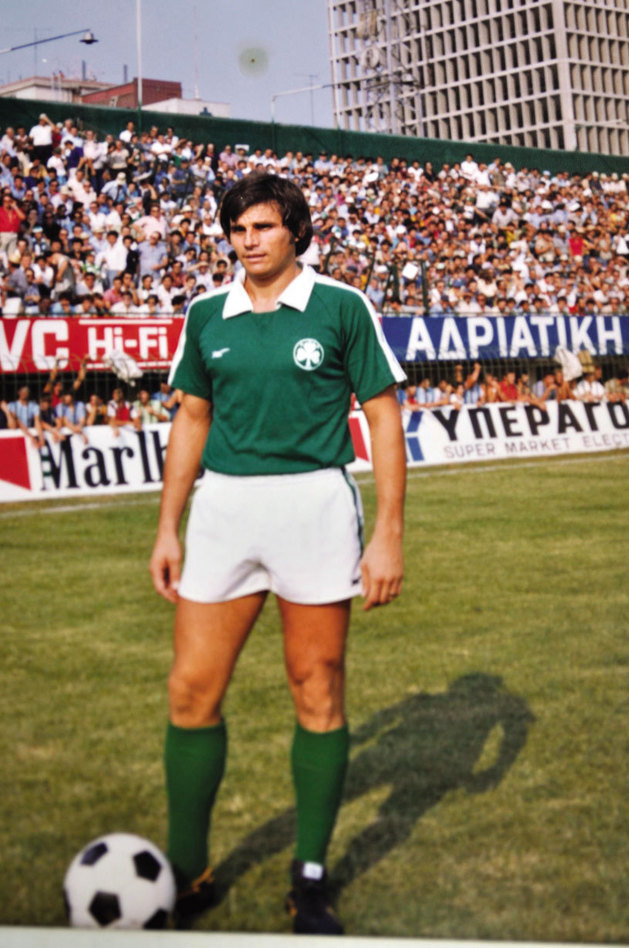
- Nicolae with Panathinaikos in the early 1980s.

Personal information
- Date of birth: 22 March 1952 (age 74)
- Place of birth: Bucharest, Romania
- Height: 1.80 m (5 ft 11 in)
- Position: Forward

Youth career
- 1963–1971: Abatorul București

Senior career*
| Years | Team | Apps | (Gls) |
| 1971–1973 | Petrolul Ploiești | 5 | (0) |
| 1973 | Steaua București | 1 | (0) |
| 1974 | Șoimii TAROM București | 12 | (0) |
| 1974–1975 | Gloria Bistrița | | |
| 1976 | Dinamo București | 6 | (0) |
| 1976–1980 | Argeș Pitești | 122 | (26) |
| 1980–1982 | Panathinaikos | 57 | (9) |
| 1982 | Gloria Bistrița | | |
| 1983 | Bihor Oradea | 16 | (0) |
| 1984–1986 | Gloria Bistrița | | |
| 1987 | Universitatea Craiova | 6 | (0) |
| 1987–1988 | Gloria Bistrița | | |
| Total | | 225 | (35) |

International career^{‡}
| 1970–1973 | Romania Olympic | 5 | (0) |
| 1973–1978 | Romania B | 1 | (0) |
| 1978–1988 | Romania | 7 | (0) |
- * Club domestic league appearances and goals as of 19 September 2017 ‡ National team caps and goals as of 19 September 2017

Doru Nicolae (born 22 March 1952) is a Romanian former professional footballer who played as a forward. He was one of few Romanian footballers who was transferred in a foreign country during the communist regime. Nicolae played seven games at international level for Romania.

== Club career ==
=== Early career ===
Nicolae, nicknamed Colombo, was born on 22 March 1952 in Bucharest, Romania, and began playing junior-level football at Abatorul București under the guidance of coach Jean Bârlăgeanu. In 1971 he joined Petrolul Ploiești where on 19 December, coach Ilie Oană gave him his Divizia A debut in a 2–0 home loss to UTA Arad. Two years later, Nicolae arrived at Steaua București, but after playing only one league game, he went to Divizia C side, Șoimii TAROM București. In 1974 he joined Gloria Bistrița which he helped earn promotion to Divizia B. Nicolae went for the second half of the 1975–76 season to Dinamo București, but did not play very much as he was competing in the offence with Dudu Georgescu, Florea Dumitrache and Mircea Lucescu.

=== Argeș Pitești ===
In 1976 Nicolae signed with Argeș Pitești where in the 1978–79 UEFA Cup edition he helped them eliminate Panathinaikos in the first round, scoring a goal in the 5–1 aggregate victory. In the following round they met Valencia led by Mario Kempes, earning a 2–1 win in the first leg, but they lost the second one with 5–2, thus the campaign ended. In the same season he formed a successful offensive trio with Nicolae Dobrin and Marin Radu, scoring four goals in the 33 appearances given to him by coach Florin Halagian. One of these goals was netted in the final game of the season against Dinamo București which ended with a 4–3 victory that helped Argeș win the title. In the following season he scored two goals in the 3–2 aggregate victory against AEK Athens in the first round of the 1979–80 European Cup, the team being eliminated in the following one by title holders and eventual winners, Nottingham Forest. In the same season he also netted a personal record of 11 goals in first league football.

=== Panathinaikos ===
In 1980, the communist regime permitted Nicolae to transfer to Panathinaikos in Greece, a club that had expressed interest in him after observing his performance in European competitions. He spent two seasons with The Greens, scoring nine goals in 57 Alpha Ethniki appearances. During this time, he earned a runner-up position in the 1981–82 edition and won the 1981–82 Greek Cup, where coach Ștefan Kovács played him for the entire match in the 1–0 victory over AEL in the final. He also played in a 4–2 home victory over Juventus in the first round of the 1980–81 UEFA Cup, but they did not manage to qualify further as the first leg was lost with 4–0.

=== Late career ===
After the spell in Greece, Nicolae returned to Romania at Gloria Bistrița in Divizia B. After half a year, he moved back to Divizia A football at Bihor Oradea, but a year later, Nicolae rejoined Gloria, where he unsuccessfully pursued promotion to the first league for several seasons. In 1987 Nicolae had a short spell at Universitatea Craiova where on 10 May he made his last Divizia A appearance in a 1–0 home win over Universitatea Cluj, totaling 156 matches with 26 goals in the competition. He ended his career in 1988 after another spell at Gloria in the second league.

== International career ==
Nicolae played seven matches for Romania, making his debut under coach Ștefan Kovács on 14 May 1978 in a 1–0 friendly loss to the Soviet Union. He played in a win over Yugoslavia and a draw against Cyprus in the Euro 1980 qualifiers. Nicolae made his last appearance for the national team on 6 June 1980 in a friendly against Belgium that ended with a 2–1 loss.

== Honours ==
Gloria Bistrița

- Divizia C: 1974–75

Argeș Pitești

- Divizia A: 1978–79

Panathinaikos

- Greek Cup: 1981–82
