= 1977 Ballon d'Or =

Annual association football award event in France

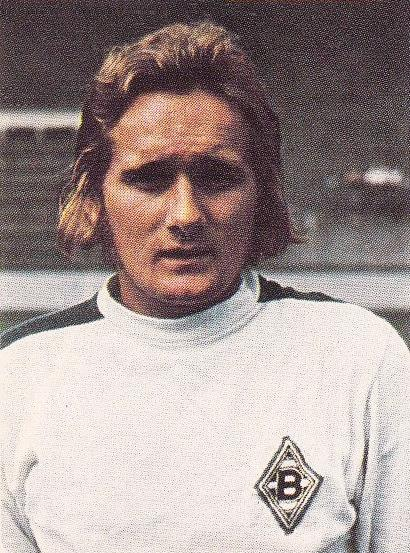
- 1977 Ballon d'Or winner, Allan Simonsen
- Date: 27 December 1977
- Presented by: France Football

Highlights
- Won by: (Denmark) Allan Simonsen (1st award)
- Website: ballondor.com

The 1977 Ballon d'Or, given to the best football player in Europe as judged by a panel of sports journalists from UEFA member countries, was awarded to the Danish forward Allan Simonsen on 27 December 1977. There were 25 voters, from Austria, Belgium, Bulgaria, Czechoslovakia, Denmark, East Germany, England, Finland, France, Greece, Hungary, Italy, Luxembourg, the Netherlands, Norway, Poland, Portugal, Republic of Ireland, Romania, Soviet Union, Spain, Sweden, Switzerland, Turkey, West Germany and Yugoslavia.

== Rankings ==
Rank	Name	Club(s)	Nationality	Points
1	Allan Simonsen	(West Germany) Borussia Mönchengladbach	Denmark	74
2	Kevin Keegan	(England) Liverpool (West Germany) Hamburger SV	England	71
3	Michel Platini	(France) Nancy	France	70
4	Roberto Bettega	(Italy) Juventus	Italy	39
5	Johan Cruyff	(Spain) Barcelona	Netherlands	23
6	Klaus Fischer	(West Germany) Schalke 04	West Germany	21
7	Tibor Nyilasi	(Hungary) Ferencváros	Hungary	13
7	Rob Rensenbrink	(Belgium) Anderlecht	Netherlands	13
9	Dudu Georgescu	(Romania) Dinamo București	Romania	6
10	Emlyn Hughes	(England) Liverpool	England	5
10	Steve Heighway	(England) Liverpool	Ireland	5
10	Berti Vogts	(West Germany) Borussia Mönchengladbach	West Germany	5
13	Dominique Bathenay	(France) Saint-Étienne	France	4
13	Trevor Brooking	(England) West Ham United	England	4
13	Anders Linderoth	(France) Marseille	Sweden	4
13	Ronnie Hellström	(West Germany) 1. FC Kaiserslautern	Sweden	4
13	Franco Causio	(Italy) Juventus	Italy	4
18	Ruud Krol	(Netherlands) Ajax	Netherlands	3
18	Marius Trésor	(France) Marseille	France	3
20	Rainer Bonhof	(West Germany) Borussia Mönchengladbach	West Germany	2
20	Heinz Flohe	(West Germany) 1. FC Köln	West Germany	2
20	Ruud Geels	(Netherlands) Ajax	Netherlands	2
20	Dieter Müller	(West Germany) 1. FC Köln	West Germany	2
20	Pirri	(Spain) Real Madrid	Spain	2
20	Peter Shilton	(England) Nottingham Forest	England	2
26	Giancarlo Antognoni	(Italy) Fiorentina	Italy	1
26	Jürgen Grabowski	(West Germany) Eintracht Frankfurt	West Germany	1
26	Gérard Janvion	(France) Saint-Étienne	France	1
26	Ray Kennedy	(England) Liverpool	England	1
26	Hans Krankl	(Austria) Rapid Wien	Austria	1
26	Gordon McQueen	(England) Leeds United	Scotland	1
26	András Törőcsik	(Hungary) Újpest	Hungary	1
