= Pär-Olof Ohlsson =

Swedish footballer

Personal information
- Full name: Pär-Olov Arnold Olsson
- Date of birth: 8 January 1954 (age 72)
- Place of birth: Varberg, Sweden
- Position: Striker

Youth career
- 1960–1969: Varbergs BoIS

Senior career*
Years	Team	Apps	(Gls)
1970–1971	Varbergs BoIS		
1972–1973	Örgryte IS	45	(18)
1974–1979	IFK Norrköping	138	(74)
1979–1981	Waterschei	70	(10)
1981–1985	Helsingborgs IF	103	(19)
1986	Ängelholms FF		

International career
1971–1972	Sweden U19	6	(0)
1972–1977	Sweden U21	19	(12)
1978	Sweden B	1	(0)
1977–1980	Sweden	6	(0)
- * Club domestic league appearances and goals

Pär-Olov Arnold Olsson (born 8 January 1954), better known as Pär-Olof Ohlsson, is a Swedish former professional footballer who played as a striker. Starting his career with Varbergs BoIS in 1970, he went on to represent Örgryte IS, IFK Norrköping, Waterschei, and Helsingborgs IF before retiring at Ängelholms FF in 1986. A full international between 1977 and 1980, he won six caps for the Sweden national team.

== Club career ==
=== Early career ===
Ohlsson started off his footballing career with Varbergs BoIS and made his senior debut for the team at the age of 16 and helped the team win the 1970 Division 3 Sydvästra Götaland title and win promotion to Division 2. After two seasons with Varbergs BoIS, Ohlsson signed with the Allsvenskan club Örgryte IS in 1972 with which he spent two seasons. In 1974, he signed with IFK Norrköping where he played for five years, including at the 1978–79 UEFA Cup.

=== Waterschei ===
He was signed by the Belgian club Waterschei in 1979, and spent two seasons playing in the Belgian First Division A and helped the club win the 1979–80 Belgian Cup. He also represented the club in the UEFA Cup as well as the UEFA Cup Winners' Cup.

=== Return to Sweden and retirement ===
Ohlsson returned to Sweden in 1981 to sign for Helsingborgs IF, and was named the club's player of the year in 1984 (Årets HIF:are). He then retired at Ängelholms FF in 1986.

== International career ==
=== Youth ===
Ohlsson played six games for the Sweden U19 team between 1971 and 1972 before making his debut for the Sweden U21 team in 1972. He would go on to score 12 goals for the U21 team, which puts him at a joint-third place for most goals scored for the team behind Ola Toivonen and Carlos Standberg (both at 13 goals).

=== Senior ===
Ohlsson made his full international debut for Sweden on 5 October 1977 in a friendly game against Denmark, in which he played for 69 minutes before being replaced by Johny Erlandsson in a 1–0 win. He made his competitive debut for Sweden on 10 October 1979 in a UEFA Euro 1980 qualifying game against Czechoslovakia, playing for 73 minutes before being replaced by Anders Grönhagen in a 1–4 loss. He won his sixth and final cap in a 1982 FIFA World Cup qualifier against Israel, playing the full 90 minutes alongside Ralf Edström at forward in a 0–0 draw.

Ohlsson also appeared once for the Sweden B team in 1978.

== Personal life ==
After his footballing career Ohlsson has worked as a vice-principal at an elementary school outside of Höganäs, Sweden.

== Career statistics ==
=== International ===
Appearances and goals by national team and year
National team	Year	Apps	Goals
Sweden	1977	1	0
Sweden	1978	0	0
Sweden	1979	4	0
Sweden	1980	1	0
Total		6	0

== Honours ==
Varbergs BoIS

- Division 3 Sydvästra Götaland: 1970

Waterschei

- Belgian Cup: 1979–80

Individual

- Årets HIF:are (Helsingborgs IF player of the year): 1984
