= István Weimper =

Hungarian footballer

Personal information
- Full name: István Weimper
- Date of birth: 27 August 1953 (age 73)
- Place of birth: Budapest, Hungary
- Position: Striker

Senior career*
Years	Team	Apps	(Gls)
1971–1974	VM Egyetértés	76	(14)
1974–1980	Honvéd	168	(75)
1980–1981	Dunaújváros FC	28	(12)
1981–1984	FC Tatabánya	79	(34)
1984–1985	Aris	0	(0)
1985–1986	Győri ETO	15	(3)
1986–1987	Kazincbarcikai SC		
1987	Ráckevei Aranykalász		

International career
1976–1979	Hungary	6	(0)
- * Club domestic league appearances and goals

István Weimper (born 27 August 1953) is a retired Hungarian footballer who played as a centre forward.
