= Uwe Zötzsche =

German footballer

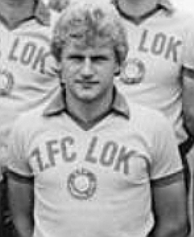
- Uwe Zötzsche, 1983

Personal information
- Date of birth: September 15, 1960 (age 66)
- Place of birth: Zwenkau, East Germany
- Position: Midfielder

Senior career*
Years	Team	Apps	(Gls)
1979–1990	Lokomotive Leipzig	243	(45)
1990–1991	RC Strasbourg	29	(2)
1991–1992	Hessen Kassel	16	(2)
1992–1994	1. FC Markkleeberg	51	(2)

International career
1982–1988	East Germany	38	(5)
- * Club domestic league appearances and goals

Uwe Zötzsche (born September 15, 1960) is a German former footballer.

He played for 1. FC Lok Leipzig for eleven years, and later had spells with RC Strasbourg, Hessen Kassel and 1. FC Markkleeberg.

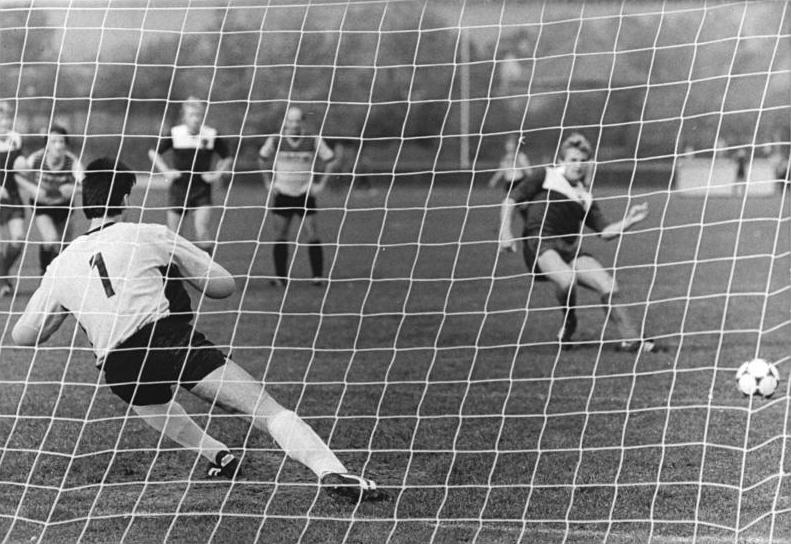
Uwe Zötzsche scoring, 1986

Zötzsche won 38 caps for East Germany and scored 5 goals.

== Honours ==
- FDGB Pokal: 1981, 1986, 1987
- UEFA Cup Winners' Cup: Runner-up 1987
