= Enrique Morán =

Spanish footballer (born 1953)

Personal information
- Full name: Enrique Morán Blanco
- Date of birth: 15 October 1953 (age 73)
- Place of birth: Pola de Lena, Spain
- Position: Forward

Youth career
- 1972–1973: Ensidesa

Senior career*
Years	Team	Apps	(Gls)
1973–1979	Sporting de Gijón	77	(22)
1979–1981	Betis	63	(30)
1981–1984	Barcelona	36	(11)
1984–1985	Atlético Madrid	11	(1)
1985–1986	Talavera	17	(6)
Total		204+	(70+)

International career
1979–1981	Spain	5	(0)
- * Club domestic league appearances and goals

Enrique Morán Blanco (born 15 October 1953) is a Spanish former footballer who played as a forward.

He played 168 games and scored 58 goals in La Liga for Sporting Gijón, Betis, Barcelona and Atlético Madrid, and earned five caps for Spain.

== Club career ==
Born in Pola near Lena in Asturias, Morán began his career at CD Ensidesa before moving to La Liga club Sporting de Gijón. After two seasons at Real Betis, he transferred to FC Barcelona in 1981; Real Madrid had a deal with Betis to sign him for 55 million Spanish pesetas in two instalments, while Barcelona president Josep Lluís Núñez gained the upper hand by paying in one go.

Morán played five games and scored three goals as Barcelona won the UEFA Cup Winners' Cup in 1981–82. One of these came on 3 March in a 3–0 quarter-final first-leg win away to 1. FC Lokomotive Leipzig in East Germany, the first football match broadcast on television in the Catalan language. On 18 April 1982, substitute Morán was sent off in a 3–1 loss away to Real Madrid; having won a foul, he protested for the referee to give his opponent a card, with such persistence that he was booked and sent off for dissent. He suggested that he would use a pistol for self-defence if referees would not punish fouls. He concluded the season out of the team, missing their European triumph, amidst rumours of a return to Betis.

On 4 June 1983, Morán played as a substitute for Esteban Vigo in the Copa del Rey final, which Barcelona won 2–1 against El Clásico rivals Real Madrid in La Romareda.

Morán played and scored frequently in his first season at the Camp Nou under manager Udo Lattek, but lost his place when César Luis Menotti became manager and preferred his fellow Argentine Diego Maradona. Núñez offered him a new contract in 1984 but he rejected it, wishing to play more frequently at Atlético Madrid despite a lower salary. He played one season for the Colchoneros and one more for Talavera CF in Segunda División B before retiring in 1986.

== International career ==
Morán earned five caps for the Spain national football team, all in friendly games over two years. His debut was on 14 March 1979 in a 1–0 loss to Czechoslovakia in Bratislava. He was one of three attacking substitutions at half time for manager László Kubala, forming a trident with Roberto López Ufarte and Pichi Alonso.

== Personal life ==
Morán remained living in Madrid since joining Atlético in 1984. He invested in property and helped his two brothers run hotels. A prospective career as a football manager was ended by his fear of flying, while he had no interest in being a football pundit.

Having retired at 32, Morán got married at 48; as of 2017 he had a 15-year-old son.
