= Vladimir Suchilin =

Soviet footballer

Personal information
- Full name: Vladimir Viktorovich Suchilin
- Date of birth: 22 January 1950
- Place of birth: Kolchugino, USSR
- Date of death: 2 November 2014 (aged 64)
- Position: Midfielder

Senior career*
Years	Team	Apps	(Gls)
1967–1969	Metallurg Kolchugino		
1970	Kovrovets Kovrov		
1971–1975	FC Torpedo Vladimir		
1976–1979	FC Torpedo Moscow		
1980	FC Torpedo Vladimir		
1981	FC Spartak Kostroma		
1984–1987	FC Spartak Kostroma		
1988	Lokomotiv Gorky		

International career
1976	USSR	1	(0)
- * Club domestic league appearances and goals

Vladimir Viktorovich Suchilin (Russian: Владимир Викторович Сучилин; 22 January 1950 – 2 November 2014) was a Soviet football player from Kolchugino.

== Honours ==
- Soviet Top League winner: 1976 (autumn).

== International career ==
Suchilin played his only game for USSR on 28 November 1976 in a friendly against Argentina.
