= Józef Kwiatkowski =

Polish footballer (born 1950)

Personal information
- Date of birth: 30 November 1950 (age 75)
- Position: Midfielder

Senior career*
Years	Team	Apps	(Gls)
1971–1972	Zagłębie Wałbrzych		
1972–1980	Śląsk Wrocław		
1980–1981	Górnik Wałbrzych		
- SV Sankt Veit

International career
1974–1975	Poland	7	(1)
- * Club domestic league appearances and goals

Józef Kwiatkowski (born 30 November 1950) is a Polish former footballer who played as a midfielder.

He made seven appearances for the Poland national team from 1974 to 1975.

== Honours ==
Śląsk Wrocław

- Ekstraklasa: 1976–77
- Polish Cup: 1975–76
