= Chemie Böhlen =

German football club

- Full name: Sportverein Chemie Böhlen
- Founded: October 1952 (as Aktivist); 17 July 1990 (refounded)
- League: Kreisoberliga Muldental/Leipziger Land (VIII)
- 2015–16: 6th

SV Chemie Böhlen is a German football club based in Böhlen, Saxony. The club is the successor to BSG Chemie Böhlen which played four seasons in the former East German first division DDR-Oberliga.

== History ==
The original Chemie was formed in October 1952 as a merger of BSG Aktivist West and BSG Aktivist Mitte, which were founded in 1949 as BSG Benzinwerk and BSG Brennstoff respectively and renamed in July 1951.

The first league Aktivist entered was the Bezirksliga Leipzig (III-IV) and stayed there until they won promotion to the 2. DDR-Liga (III) after a Leipzig district title win in 1956. They lasted for six more seasons until the 2. Liga was scrapped in 1963, when they were one of 64 teams regrouped in the Bezirksliga because a third-place finish for them was way short of a promotion playoff place. Aktivist won the Leipzig division in 1964 and 1966 but clinched one of two promotion places in the latter year's playoffs. Their debut in the DDR-Liga (II) was a disappointing one, ending in second from bottom and relegation yet they acted as a yo-yo club in 1967 when they earned their third Bezirksliga title and succeeded in the playoffs again.

The club, renamed Chemie Böhlen in 1969, played ten more seasons in the DDR-Liga and they earned their historic moment when they advanced to the DDR-Oberliga for the first time ever on finishing the 1977 promotion round and the season in first place, after falling behind despite a division win three years earlier; their tenure in the top division of East German football was for only four seasons and bounced around between the top two tiers, winning two more group titles and promotions from 1979 to 1982. Chemie played the last eight seasons of the DDR-Liga and won Group B before the league system dissolved.

=== Merger and refoundation ===
With German reunification underway, on 30 June 1990 BSG Chemie merged with Grün-Weiß Leipzig (formerly BSG Chemie Leipzig), runners-up in Group B of the final DDR-Liga season to becomeSachsen Leipzig, which is now defunct and replaced by successor clubs. Former members of BSG Chemie refounded SV Chemie on 17 July and their football team restarted in the Bezirksliga Leipzig (V) and won promotion to the Landesliga Sachsen (IV) in 1994 but went down after three seasons and withdrew after bankruptcy. Chemie subsequently joined the Kreisklasse Borna/Geithain (VII) and in 2003 went up to the Bezirksklasse/Kreisoberliga (VII-VIII) where they presently belong, except two seasons in the Kreisliga after voluntary reassignment.

== Honors ==
- DDR-Liga
  - Co-winners: 1974, 1977, 1980, 1982, 1990
- Bezirksliga Leipzig
  - Winners: 1994
- Kreisliga Muldental/Leipziger Land West
  - Winners: 2015
