= Roman Faber =

Polish footballer (born 1955)

Personal information
- Full name: Roman Ryszard Faber
- Date of birth: 16 December 1955 (age 70)
- Place of birth: Wrocław, Poland
- Height: 1.72 m (5 ft 8 in)
- Position: Midfielder

Senior career*
Years	Team	Apps	(Gls)
1973–1984	Śląsk Wrocław		
1984–1987	Wiener SC		
1987–1988	Viktoria Köln		

International career
1979	Poland	2	(1)
- * Club domestic league appearances and goals

Roman Ryszard Faber (born 16 December 1955) is a Polish former professional footballer who played as a midfielder.

He earned two caps for the Poland national team in 1979.

== Honours ==
Śląsk Wrocław

- Ekstraklasa: 1976–77
- Polish Cup: 1975–76
