= László Gyimesi (footballer) =

Hungarian footballer

Personal information
- Full name: László Gyimesi
- Date of birth: 8 September 1957 (age 69)
- Place of birth: Budapest, Hungary
- Position: Midfielder

Youth career
- –1974: Műanyag SC

Senior career*
Years	Team	Apps	(Gls)
1974–1987	Budapest Honvéd FC	290	(37)
1987	Győri ETO FC	10	(3)
1987–1988	Budapest Honvéd FC	21	(3)
1988–1992	K.R.C. Genk	86	(17)

International career
1978–1988	Hungary	12	(1)

Managerial career
- 1997–1998: Csepel SC
- 2004–2005: Vác FC
- 2007–2008: Tököl VSK
- Inter 04
- * Club domestic league appearances and goals

László Gyimesi (born 8 September 1957) is a former Hungarian professional footballer who played as a midfielder. He was a member of the Hungary national team. Gyimesi works as an active football coach.

== Career ==
Gyimesi started playing football for Budapest Honvéd FC in the Hungarian national championship, where he played for 14 years, with a short interruption. Since 1988, he has played for K.R.C. Genk in Belgium, where he finished his active football career in 1992.

=== National team ===
Between 1978 and 1988, Gyimesi played 12 times for the Hungary national team and scored one goal.

=== As a coach ===
Gyimesi has coached four teams since 1997. These were as follows: Csepel SC, Vác FC, Tököl VSK and Inter 04.

== Honours ==
- Nemzeti Bajnokság I (NB I)
  - Champion: 1979–80, 1983–84, 1984–85, 1985–86, 1987–88
- Magyar Kupa (MNK)
  - Winner: 1985
