= Thomas Larsen (footballer) =

Danish footballer (born 1954)

Personal information
- Date of birth: 11 February 1954 (age 72)
- Place of birth: Jægersborg, Denmark
- Position: Midfielder

Senior career*
Years	Team	Apps	(Gls)
1973–1976	Lyngby Boldklub		
1976–1981	B 1903		
1981–1985	Lyngby Boldklub		
1985–1988	B 1903		

International career
1980	Denmark	2	(0)
- * Club domestic league appearances and goals

Thomas Larsen (born 11 February 1954) is a Danish former footballer who played as a midfielder. He made two appearances for the Denmark national team in 1980.
