= Gábor Híres =

Hungarian footballer (born 1958)

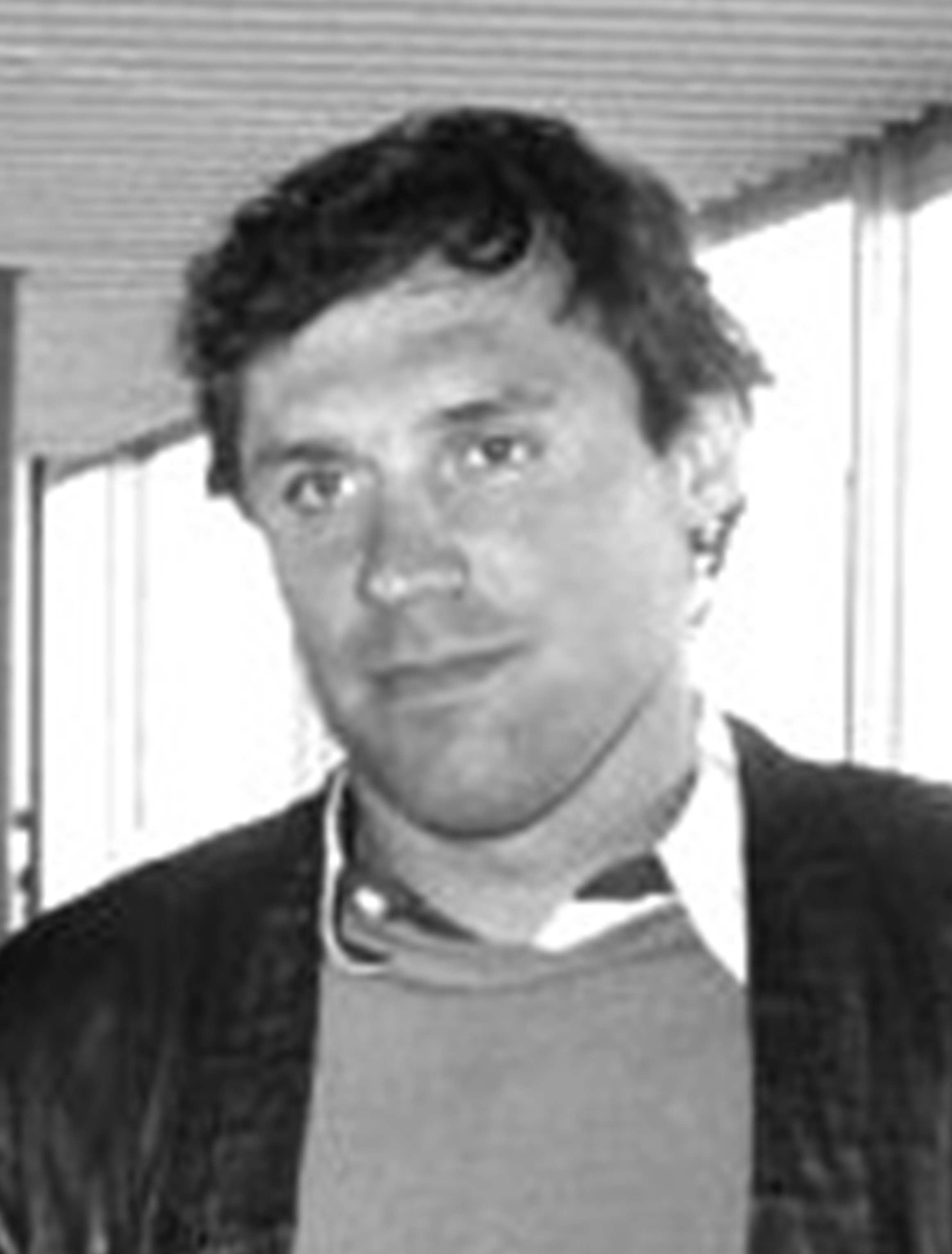
- Híres in 1987

Personal information
- Date of birth: 26 February 1958 (age 68)
- Place of birth: Budapest, Hungary
- Position: Defender

Youth career
- 1966-1977: Vasas SC

Senior career*
Years	Team	Apps	(Gls)
1977-1986	Vasas SC	200	(14)
1986-1994	MTK Budapest FC	188	(4)

International career
1987	Hungary	4	(0)

Managerial career
- 1994: Szegedi EAC
- 1994: Gödöllö
- 2000-2001: Rákospalotai EAC
- 2004-2008: Őrbottyán KSE
- 2011-2012: Vác FC
- 2012-2014: Balmazújvárosi FC
- 2014-2017: FC Hatvan
- 2022: Mezőkövesdi SE
- * Club domestic league appearances and goals

Gábor Híres (born 26 February 1958) is a Hungarian former professional footballer who played as a defender. He was a member of the Hungary national team. Híres has worked as an active football coach since 1994.

== Club career ==
In 1966 Híres started playing football for Vasas SC. He made his first team debut in 1977. Vasas won two championship bronze medals and two Hungarian Cup victories. Until 1986, he scored 14 goals in 200 league games for the Angyalföld team Vasas SC. His next team was MTK Budapest FC, where he became a one-time champion.

== International career ==
Híres played four times for the Hungary national team in 1987.

== Honours ==
- Nemzeti Bajnokság I: 1986–87
- Magyar Kupa: 1981, 1986
