= Miroslav Gajdůšek =

Czech footballer

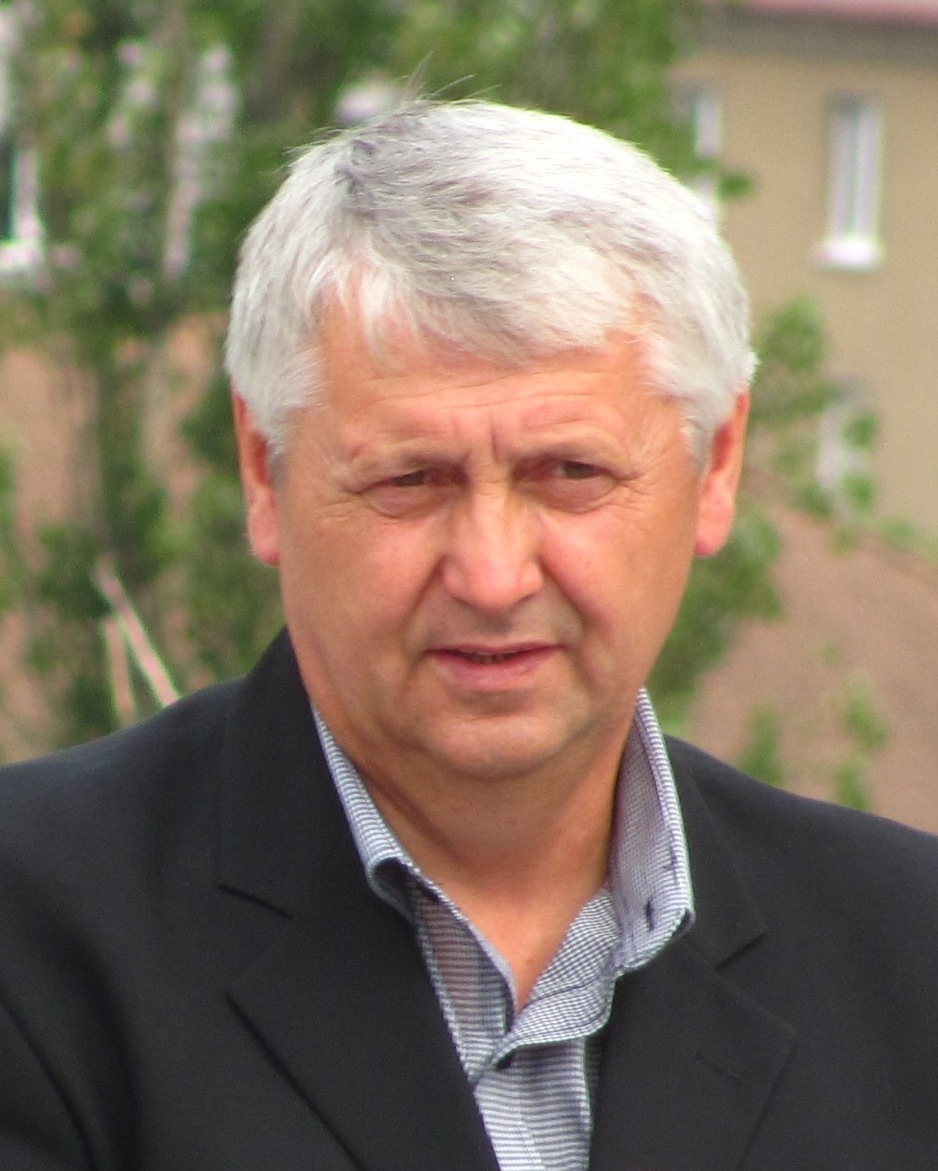

Personal information
- Date of birth: 20 September 1951 (age 75)
- Place of birth: Otrokovice, Czechoslovakia
- Height: 1.82 m (6 ft 0 in)
- Position: Winger

Youth career
- –1969: Jiskra Otrokovice

Senior career*
Years	Team	Apps	(Gls)
1969–1970	TJ Gottwaldov		
1970–1981	Dukla Prague	297	(71)
1981–1984	TJ Vítkovice	58	(6)

International career
1971–1980	Czechoslovakia	48	(4)
- * Club domestic league appearances and goals

Miroslav Gajdůšek (born 20 September 1951) is a former Czech footballer.

== Club career ==
During his career, he played for TJ Gottwaldov, Dukla Prague and TJ Vítkovice. He played total 355 league matches and scored 77 goals. He won the Czechoslovak First League with Dukla in 1977 and 1979.

== International career ==
Gajdůšek earned 48 caps and scored 4 goals for the Czechoslovakia national football team from 1971 to 1980, and participated in UEFA Euro 1980.
