= 1977 Danish 1st Division =

32nd season of Danish 1st Division

Danish 1st Division
- Season: 1977

Statistics of Danish 1st Division in the 1977 season.

== Overview ==
It was contested by 16 teams, and Odense Boldklub won the championship.

== League standings ==
Pos	Team	Pld	W	D	L	GF	GA	GD	Pts
1	Odense Boldklub	30	19	9	2	66	27	+39	47
2	Boldklubben 1903	30	15	9	6	61	41	+20	39
3	Esbjerg fB	30	12	10	8	47	35	+12	34
4	Vejle Boldklub	30	13	8	9	57	46	+11	34
5	B 1901	30	12	10	8	51	42	+9	34
6	Kastrup Boldklub	30	14	6	10	45	36	+9	34
7	Kjøbenhavns Boldklub	30	12	8	10	60	52	+8	32
8	Køge BK	30	13	3	14	56	46	+10	29
9	Aarhus Gymnastikforening	30	11	7	12	45	46	−1	29
10	Randers Sportsklub Freja	30	13	3	14	47	68	−21	29
11	Boldklubben Frem	30	10	7	13	45	55	−10	27
12	Frederikshavn fI	30	9	7	14	40	59	−19	25
13	Boldklubben af 1893	30	8	8	14	47	59	−12	24
14	Aalborg Boldspilklub	30	6	10	14	33	43	−10	22
15	Boldklubben 1909	30	8	5	17	44	65	−21	21
16	Holbæk B&I	30	8	4	18	41	65	−24	20

== Results ==
Home \ Away	AaB	AGF	B93	B01	B03	B09	EfB	FfI	BKF	HOL	KAS	KB	KBK	OB	RSF	VBK
Aalborg BK	—	4–1	1–2	1–1	0–0	3–1	1–1	1–1	0–2	1–0	2–2	2–3	2–1	0–2	0–3	0–0
Aarhus GF	1–0	—	5–1	1–1	3–0	2–0	1–1	0–1	3–2	3–0	0–1	2–3	1–0	1–4	4–1	1–2
B.93	3–2	2–3	—	1–2	0–2	3–2	1–1	3–0	3–0	3–1	2–3	1–1	3–4	2–2	0–1	1–2
B 1901	2–0	1–1	3–0	—	2–1	4–1	1–2	2–2	2–2	5–2	1–0	2–2	2–0	2–2	1–2	1–3
B 1903	1–0	1–2	2–1	1–1	—	1–1	3–2	4–1	1–1	5–1	0–2	3–1	2–1	1–1	1–0	3–3
B 1909	1–0	3–1	1–2	1–2	2–2	—	0–3	3–1	1–1	3–2	2–0	1–2	3–1	1–3	4–0	2–4
Esbjerg fB	1–1	0–2	2–0	4–0	2–0	1–1	—	2–2	2–3	2–0	2–0	2–1	2–0	0–0	2–0	1–0
Frederikshavn fI	0–3	1–1	2–2	0–2	2–4	1–0	2–5	—	2–0	4–2	1–2	2–0	0–3	1–0	0–3	1–0
BK Frem	1–4	2–1	2–0	2–2	1–3	2–1	4–1	1–1	—	1–1	1–2	0–0	0–1	1–3	4–1	2–3
Holbæk B&I	2–1	1–1	0–0	0–0	1–2	3–2	4–2	3–1	5–1	—	1–0	2–6	0–3	0–1	2–1	2–0
Kastrup BK	3–1	0–0	0–0	2–1	1–1	4–0	1–1	5–2	1–0	3–2	—	1–0	1–3	0–3	4–0	0–4
Kjøbenhavns BK	4–0	2–2	1–1	1–3	1–4	7–3	0–0	0–3	7–1	3–1	2–1	—	3–1	2–1	2–3	3–2
Køge BK	1–1	5–1	2–2	1–3	0–3	7–1	2–1	2–0	0–1	2–0	0–4	3–0	—	0–2	5–0	2–0
Odense BK	2–1	2–0	5–1	2–0	4–2	1–1	1–1	1–1	2–1	3–0	1–0	0–0	3–2	—	6–1	3–2
Randers Freja	0–0	3–1	1–4	3–2	2–6	1–0	2–0	2–4	1–2	2–0	2–1	4–2	4–3	3–3	—	0–4
Vejle BK	1–1	2–0	6–3	2–0	2–2	1–2	2–1	3–1	1–4	4–3	1–1	1–1	1–1	0–3	1–1	—

Legend: Blue = home team win; Yellow = draw; Red = away team win.
