= Jaromír Fausek =

Czech football referee

- Full name: Jaromír Fausek
- Born: 13 May 1938 (age 88); Prague, Czechoslovakia
- Other occupation: Lawyer

Domestic
Years	League	Role
1973-1986	Czechoslovak First League	Referee

International
Years	League	Role
1977-1986	FIFA listed	Referee

Jaromír Fausek (born 13 May 1938 in Prague) is a former Czech football referee.

From his young age, Fausek played football. His highest achievement was appearance in the Divize (fourth-tier league) for VTJ Dukla Žilina during his compulsory military service.

He became a football referee in 1958. From 1973 to 1986 Fausek refereed in the Czechoslovak First League, where he appeared in 274 matches. His highest achievement as a referee was a designation as FIFA referee. As a FIFA official, he refereed 140 international matches in 1977-1986, including UEFA Euro 1980 qualifying. After finishing his active career, he worked as a sport official at the Czechoslovak Football Association.

He graduated from the law faculty of the Charles University in Prague. In 2001, he published a book named Toulky s fotbalem (Journeys with Football), where he summarizes his experience from work as a referee all over the world.
