= List of Royal Standard de Liège players =

Standard Liège is a Belgian professional football team formed in 1898. Throughout its history the club's first team has competed in various national and international competitions. All players who have played in 50 or more such matches are listed below.

== Key ==
- Players with name in **bold** currently play for the club.
- Years are the first and last calendar years in which the player appeared in competitive first-team football for the club.
- League appearances and goals comprise those in the Belgian First Division A and its predecessors of top-level league football in Belgium.
- Total appearances and goals comprise those in the Belgian First Division A, Belgian First Division A Playoffs, Belgian Cup, Belgian League Cup, Belgian Super Cup, UEFA Europa League, UEFA Europa League and several now-defunct competitions.

== Players with 50 or more appearances ==
Appearances and goals are for first-team competitive matches only. Substitute appearances are included. Statistics are correct as of 1 May 2017.

Position key: GK – Goalkeeper; DF – Defender; MF – Midfielder; FW – Forward

Name	Nationality	Position	Standard Liège career	League Appearances	League Goals	Total Appearances	Total Goals	Notes
Rabiu Afolabi	Nigeria	DF	1997–2000; 2001–2003	89	2	89	2	
**Darwin Andrade**	Colombia	DF	2014–	36	0	61	1	
Rorys Aragón	Ecuador	GK	2006–2009	53	0	53	0	
Dino Arslanagić	Belgium	DF	2012–2017	57	3	57	3	
Ole Martin Årst	Norway	FW	2000–2003	73	41	73	41	
Patrick Asselman	Belgium	MF	1990–1994	89	17	89	17	
Patrick Aussems	Belgium	DF	1983–1988	75	8	75	8	
Sambégou Bangoura	Guinea	FW	2003–2006	53	21	53	21	
Michy Batshuayi	Belgium	FW	2010–2014	78	34	78	34	
Émile Bellefroid	Belgium	DF	1931–1939	169	0	169	0	
Robert Berghmans	Belgium	DF	1933–1936	50	0	50	0	
Alain Bettagno	Belgium	MF	1989–1996	127	31	127	31	
Jacques Beurlet	Belgium	DF	1961–1974	348	12	348	12	
Mathieu Billen	Belgium	DF	1975–1978	71	3	71	3	
Roberto Bisconti	Belgium	MF	1991–1995; 1996–1997; 1998–2000; 2003–2004	142	11	142	11	
Fernand Blaise	Belgium	DF	1943–1956	314	54	314	54	
George Blay	Ghana	DF	1997–2000	92	3	92	3	
Gilbert Bodart	Belgium	GK	1979–1996; 1997–1998	390	8	390	8	
Sinan Bolat	Turkey	GK	2008–2013	75	0	75	0	
Maurice Bolsée	Belgium	DF	1956–1962	96	13	96	13	
Paul Bonga Bonga	Belgian Congo	MF	1957–1963	100	7	100	7	
Matthieu Bonhivers	Belgium	MF	1924–1934	140	19	140	19	
Fernand Boogaerts	Belgium	GK	1948–1955	160	0	160	0	
Jean-Marc Bosman	Belgium	MF	1983–1988	74	3	74	3	
Jean Bouttiau	Belgium	MF	1909–1914	80	14	80	14	
Paul Bouttiau	Belgium	DF	1909–1914	84	1	84	1	
Jean Brichaut	Belgium	FW	1929–1936	163	103	163	103	
David Brocken	Belgium	DF	2000–2002	41	1	52	1	
Josip Bukal	Yugoslavia	FW	1973–1977	60	34	60	34	
Frédéric Bulot	Gabon	MF	2012–2015	47	3	76	8	
Yoni Buyens	Belgium	MF	2011–2014	77	9	77	9	
Marcos Camozzato	Brazil	DF	2006–2010	90	1	90	1	
Jean Capelle	Belgium	FW	1929–1944	285	242	285	242	
Mehdi Carcela-González	Morocco	MF	2008–2012; 2013–2015	96	19	96	19	
Fabián Carini	Uruguay	GK	2002–2004	61	0	61	0	
Franz Carlier	Belgium	FW	1945–1951	154	93	154	93	
Laurent Ciman	Belgium	DF	2010–2015	123	6	123	6	
Liviu Ciobotariu	Romania	DF	2000–2001	43	0	53	2	
**Ibrahima Cissé**	Guinea	MF	2012–2014; 2016–	43	1	67	2	
Constant Claes	Belgium	DF	1920–1924	64	7	64	7	
Roger Claessen	Belgium	FW	1958–1968	229	161	229	161	
Sérgio Conceição	Portugal	MF	2004–2007	74	21	74	21	
Dieudonné Couquelet	Belgium	MF	1924–1936	187	8	187	8	
André Cruz	Brazil	DF	1990–1994; 1999	116	19	116	19	
Cyriac	Ivory Coast	FW	2009–2012	48	16	65	18	
Alexandre Czerniatynski	Belgium	FW	1985–1989	116	46	116	46	
Jos Daerden	Belgium	MF	1980–1984	110	21	110	21	
Pierre Dalem	Belgium	MF	1931–1939	162	5	162	5	
Wilfried Dalmat	France	MF	2008–2010	50	6	50	6	
Dante (footballer)	Brazil	DF	2006–2009	63	2	63	2	
Guy Dardenne	Belgium	MF	1973–1976; 1984–1986	90	9	90	9	
Igor de Camargo	Belgium	FW	2005–2010; 2013–2015	158	43	158	43	
Dimitri De Condé	Belgium	MF	1995–1999	123	16	123	16	
Julien De Sart	Belgium	MF	2013–2016	47	3	74	3	
Benjamin Debusschere	Belgium	DF	1996–1998	41	2	55	2	
Eric Deflandre	Belgium	DF	2004–2007	76	1	76	1	
Steven Defour	Belgium	MF	2006–2012	119	13	119	13	
Guillaume Degueldere	Belgium	MF	1925–1932	60	10	60	10	
Paul Dehaar	Belgium	DF	1920–1928	99	30	99	30	
Etienne Delangre	Belgium	DF	1981–1992	266	6	266	6	
Henri Deleu	Belgium	MF	1941–1949	155	2	155	2	
Arthur Delgrange	Belgium	DF	1920–1935	221	27	221	27	
Siramana Dembélé	France	MF	2005–2009	50	0	50	0	
Stéphane Demol	Belgium	DF	1991–1993	56	5	56	5	
Nicolas Dewalque	Belgium	MF	1963–1976	163	3	163	3	
Dinga (footballer)	Brazil	DF	1989–1998	123	1	123	1	
Georges Ditzler	Belgium	DF	1920–1932	233	20	233	20	
René Dohet	Belgium	MF	1920–1929	139	14	139	14	
Léon Dolmans	Belgium	DF	1970–1975	112	6	112	6	
**Mathieu Dossevi**	Togo	MF	2015–	43	5	60	7	
Ivica Dragutinović	Serbia	DF	2000–2006	136	3	136	3	
Édouard Dufrasne	Belgium	FW	1909–1914	51	3	51	3	
Jean Dupont	Belgium	FW	1920–1929	51	3	51	3	
Ralf Edström	Sweden	FW	1979–1981	51	27	51	27	
Joseph Enakarhire	Nigeria	DF	2000–2004	77	1	77	1	
**Eyong Enoh**	Cameroon	MF	2014–	38	1	69	1	
Didier Ernst	Belgium	MF	1991–2002	240	6	240	6	
Imoh Ezekiel	Nigeria	FW	2012–2014; 2015	59	26	59	26	
Lucien Fabry	Belgium	FW	1920–1928	89	71	89	71	
Felipe Trevizan Martins	Brazil	DF	2009–2012	43	3	82	4	
Marouane Fellaini	Belgium	MF	2006–2008	64	10	64	10	
António Folha	Portugal	MF	1998–1999; 2001	40	5	52	8	
Franz Frederick	Belgium	DF	1910–1914	51	0	51	0	
Milan Galić	Yugoslavia	FW	1966–1970	111	41	111	41	
Philippe Garot	Belgium	FW	1974–1980	189	25	189	25	
Régis Genaux	Belgium	DF	1990–1997; 2001–2002	155	1	155	1	
Karel Geraerts	Belgium	MF	2004–2007	93	16	93	16	
Eric Gerets	Belgium	DF	1971–1983	322	27	322	27	
René Gillard	Belgium	DF	1941–1950	261	7	261	7	
Maurice Gillis	Belgium	FW	1920–1935	259	124	259	124	
Joseph Givard	Belgium	MF	1952–1960	155	60	155	60	
Michaël Goossens	Belgium	FW	1990–1997; 1999–2003	226	74	226	74	
**Réginal Goreux**	Haiti	DF	2007–2013; 2015–	124	6	124	6	
André Gorez	Belgium	FW	1975–1978	100	16	100	16	
Gilbert Govaert	Belgium	MF	1972–1976	64	2	64	2	
Helmut Graf	Germany	MF	1976–1982	157	16	157	16	
Heinz Gründel	Germany	MF	1982–1985	96	17	96	17	
Arie Haan	Netherlands	MF	1981–1983	65	13	65	13	
Stijn Haeldermans	Belgium	MF	1997–1999	54	7	54	7	
René Hanquet	Belgium	MF	1920–1925	78	14	78	14	
Joseph Happart	Belgium	DF	1947–1960	299	1	299	1	
Guy Hellers	Luxembourg	MF	1983–2000	383	29	383	29	
Roger Henrotay	Belgium	MF	1968–1975	133	34	133	34	
Denis Houf	Belgium	MF	1948–1964	379	102	379	102	
Léonard Jacquemin	Belgium	MF	1912–1914	59	13	59	13	
Jean Jadot	Belgium	MF	1948–1960	224	80	224	80	
Waldemar Jaskulski	Poland	DF	1996–1999	49	3	63	4	
Léon Jeck	Belgium	DF	1964–1974	236	3	236	3	
Zoran Jelikić	Yugoslavia	DF	1983–1988	77	5	77	5	
Milan Jovanović (footballer, born 1981)	Serbia	FW	2006–2010	114	52	114	52	
Eiji Kawashima	Japan	GK	2012–2015	68	0	68	0	
Raymond Knell	Belgium	MF	1932–1944	192	33	192	33	
Serhiy Kovalenko	Ukraine	MF	2004–2007	45	5	53	8	
Christian Labarbe	Belgium	DF	1971–1980	197	12	197	12	
Paul Lambrichts	Belgium	DF	1988–1989	49	0	61	0	
Philippe Léonard	Belgium	DF	1992–1996; 2004–2006	180	6	180	6	
Mbaye Leye	Senegal	FW	2010–2012	35	6	56	12	
Julien Louis	Belgium	GK	1941–1949	193	0	193	0	
Ali Lukunku	Democratic Republic of the Congo	FW	1998–2003; 2006–2008	121	45	121	45	
Freddy Luyckx	Belgium	DF	1984–1989	160	5	160	5	
Peter Maes	Belgium	GK	1996–1998	43	0	57	0	
Fernand Massay	Belgium	DF	1937–1954	352	35	352	35	
Jean Mathonet	Belgium	FW	1945–1960	375	143	375	143	
Dieumerci Mbokani	Democratic Republic of the Congo	FW	2007–2011	81	35	81	35	
Walter Meeuws	Belgium	DF	1981–1984	88	6	88	6	
Harold Meyssen	Belgium	MF	2000–2003	84	7	84	7	
**Martin Milec**	Slovenia	DF	2014–	31	1	51	1	
Almami Moreira	Guinea-Bissau	MF	2001–2006	113	18	113	18	
Ivica Mornar	Croatia	FW	1998–2001	69	23	69	23	
Émile Mpenza	Belgium	FW	1997–2000; 2003–2004	75	41	75	41	
Mbo Mpenza	Belgium	FW	1997–2000	54	19	54	19	
Paul-José M'Poku	Democratic Republic of the Congo	MF	2011–2015	71	13	71	13	
Geoffrey Mujangi Bia	Belgium	MF	2011–2015	66	18	66	18	
Landry Mulemo	Democratic Republic of the Congo	DF	2007–2010	56	0	56	0	
Daniël Nassen	Belgium	DF	1985–1991	137	1	137	1	
Velimir Naumović	Yugoslavia	FW	1965–1969	66	3	66	3	
Benjamin Nicaise	France	MF	2008–2010	42	1	65	3	
Jean Nicolay	Belgium	GK	1955–1969	336	0	336	0	
Toussaint Nicolay	Belgium	GK	1951–1960	169	0	169	0	
Luís Norton de Matos	Portugal	FW	1978–1981	67	17	67	17	
Guillermo Ochoa	Mexico	GK	2017–2019	78	0	86	0	
Godwin Okpara	Nigeria	DF	2001–2004	68	1	68	1	
Oguchi Onyewu	United States	DF	2004–2009	140	11	210	19	
Daniel Opare	Ghana	DF	2010–2014	60	0	60	0	
Joseph Paty	Belgium	GK	1920–1940	229	0	229	0	
Bernd Patzke	Germany	DF	1962–1964	54	2	54	2	
António Eduardo Pereira dos Santos	Brazil	DF	2011–2014	59	2	59	2	
Roger Petit	Belgium	DF	1931–1942	207	8	207	8	
Christian Pilot	Belgium	GK	1966–1978	305	9	305	9	
Louis Pilot	Luxembourg	MF	1961–1972	264	36	264	36	
Jacques Pirlot	Belgium	DF	1920–1932	149	3	149	3	
Thierry Pister	Belgium	MF	1990–1994	81	4	81	4	
Gérard Plessers	Belgium	DF	1975–1984	186	14	186	14	
Sébastien Pocognoli	Belgium	DF	2009–2012	62	2	62	2	
Theo Poel	Belgium	DF	1975–1986	289	7	289	7	
Michel Preud'homme	Belgium	GK	1977–1986	240	0	240	0	
Victor Putmans	Belgium	FW	1936–1946	192	77	192	77	
Ljubomir Radanović	Yugoslavia	DF	1988–1992	66	3	66	3	
Milan Rapaić	Croatia	MF	2004–2007	60	15	60	15	
Mircea Rednic	Romania	DF	1991–1996	140	3	140	3	
Srebrenko Repčić	Yugoslavia	FW	1985–1988	92	19	92	19	
Gauthier Remacle	Belgium	MF	1996–2000	74	7	74	7	
Olivier Renard	Belgium	GK	2005–2008	40	0	53	0	
Michel Renquin	Belgium	DF	1974–1981; 1985–1988	274	4	274	4	
Alfred Riedl	Austria	FW	1976–1980	105	53	105	53	
Ronny Rosenthal	Israel	FW	1988–1990	44	20	54	25	
Vedran Runje	Croatia	GK	1998–2001; 2004–2006	168	1	205	1	
Alexandre Rytchkov	Russia	MF	1992–1997	51	2	51	2	
Mohamed Sarr	Senegal	DF	2005–2010	109	1	109	1	
Marc Schaessens	Belgium	MF	1989–1991	65	5	65	5	
Gunther Schepens	Belgium	MF	1993–1997	114	13	114	13	
**Alexander Scholz**	Denmark	DF	2015–	46	1	76	1	
Luis Manuel Seijas	Venezuela	MF	2011–2013	36	4	58	10	
Léon Semmeling	Belgium	FW	1959–1974	449	73	449	73	
Ásgeir Sigurvinsson	Iceland	MF	1973–1981	250	57	250	57	
Thierry Siquet	Belgium	DF	1986–1991	69	2	69	2	
Eddy Snelders	Belgium	MF	1984–1986	55	15	55	15	
Istvan Sztani	Hungary	FW	1960–1965	155	57	155	57	
Simon Tahamata	Netherlands	FW	1980–1984	130	40	130	40	
Silvester Takač	Yugoslavia	MF	1969–1974	81	32	81	32	
Mohamed Tchité	Burundi	FW	2002–2006; 2010–2012	95	37	95	37	
Benoît Thans	Belgium	MF	1988–1991; 1992–1993	84	10	84	10	
Henri Thellin	Belgium	DF	1949–1965	577	0	577	0	
Bernd Thijs	Belgium	MF	1995–2001	103	15	103	15	
Jean Thissen	Belgium	DF	1965–1974	233	11	233	11	
Yohann Thuram-Ulien	Guadeloupe	GK	2013–2016; 2004–2006	33	0	56	0	
Guy Thys	Belgium	FW	1950–1954	105	47	105	47	
Shalom Tikva	Israel	MF	1988–1991; 1995–1996	49	18	63	23	
Adrien Trebel	France	MF	2014–2017	69	3	69	3	
Önder Turacı	Turkey	DF	1998–2004	62	3	62	3	
William Vainqueur	France	MF	2011–2014	67	4	67	4	
Daniel Van Buyten	Belgium	DF	1999–2001	57	7	57	7	
Jelle Van Damme	Belgium	DF	2011–2016	120	17	120	17	
Wilfried Van Moer	Belgium	MF	1968–1976	119	17	119	17	
Frans van Rooij	Netherlands	MF	1991–1994	72	13	72	13	
Guy Vandersmissen	Belgium	MF	1978–1991	371	71	371	71	
Gonzague Vandooren	Belgium	DF	2001–2006	107	9	107	9	
Serge Verheyden	Belgium	DF	1974–1977	54	1	54	1	
Patrick Vervoort	Belgium	MF	1992–1994	42	4	55	4	
Eddy Voordeckers	Belgium	MF	1979–1982	64	21	64	21	
Henk Vos	Netherlands	MF	1989–1993	78	23	78	23	
Jonathan Walasiak	Belgium	MF	2000–2008	120	19	120	19	
Johan Walem	Belgium	MF	2001–2003	58	4	58	4	
Wamberto de Jesus Sousa Campos	Brazil	FW	1996–1998; 2004–2006	81	11	81	11	
Marcelin Waroux	Belgium	DF	1920–1932	228	1	228	1	
Willy Wellens	Belgium	FW	1978–1981	69	16	69	16	
Benny Wendt	Sweden	FW	1981–1983	56	21	56	21	
Marc Wilmots	Belgium	FW	1991–1996	136	67	136	67	
Dieudonné Wilmotte	Belgium	DF	1941–1944	133	8	133	8	
Michel Wintacq	Belgium	DF	1983–1988	126	8	126	8	
Axel Witsel	Belgium	MF	2006–2011	132	28	194	44	
Joseph Yobo	Nigeria	DF	1999–2001	49	2	55	3	
