= Henri Depireux =

Belgian footballer and manager (1944–2022)

- Depireux in 2006

Personal information
- Date of birth: 1 February 1944
- Place of birth: Liège, Belgium
- Date of death: 8 April 2022 (aged 78)
- Place of death: Visé, Belgium
- Position: Midfielder

Senior career*
Years	Team	Apps	(Gls)
1963–1968	RFC Liège		
1968–1971	Standard Liège	70	(21)
1971–1973	Racing White Brussels		
1973–1974	R.W.D. Molenbeek		
1974–1976	RFC Liège		
1976–1978	RJS Bas-Oha		

International career
1969–1971	Belgium	2	(0)

Managerial career
- 1976–1978: RJS Bas-Oha
- 1978–1980: Tilleur
- 1980–1981: Namur
- 1981–1982: K.F.C. Winterslag
- 1986–1987: Belenenses
- Wavre
- 1987–1989: Bellinzona
- 1989: Metz
- 1990: Red Star
- 1990–1991: Belenenses
- 1993–1994: AC Bellinzona
- 1996–1997: Cameroon
- 1997–1998: ASFAR
- 1998–1999: Sharjah FC
- 2000: Standard Liège (Assistant coach)
- 2002: RFC Liège
- 2003: Visé
- 2006–2007: Congo DR
- 2008: Olympique de Khouribga
- 2008: USM Annaba
- * Club domestic league appearances and goals

Henri Depireux (1 February 1944 – 8 April 2022) was a Belgian football player and manager.

== Career ==
Depireux played club football for RFC Liège and Standard de Liège. He also played twice for Belgium.

After his playing career ended, Depireux became a manager in Switzerland, France. He also coached Belenenses, the Cameroon national team. and RFC Liège.

In 2006, Depireux was named manager of Congo DR national team and resigned in 2007. In 2008, he coached North African sides Olympique de Khouribga and USM Annaba.

In 2011, Depireux joined the women's team of Standard Femina Liège as head coach.

In February 2019, he took over as head coach of KVW Zaventem, a team in the 3rd amateur league, in an attempt to prevent the club being relegated to a lower division, following a difficult season.

== Honours ==
RFC Liège

- Belgian Football League third place: 1966–67

Standard Liège

- Belgian Football League winner: 1968–69, 1969–70, 1970–71

R.W.D. Molenbeek

- Belgian Football League runner-up: 1972–73; third place: 1973–74
