= 1970–71 in Belgian football =

Football in Belgium
- Season: 1970–71

The 1970–71 season was the 68th season of competitive football in Belgium. Standard Club Liégeois won their 6th Division I title. RFC Brugeois reached the quarter-finals of the 1970–71 European Cup Winners' Cup. K Beerschot VAV won the Belgian Cup final against K Sint-Truidense VV (2–1 after extra time). The Belgium national football team started their UEFA Euro 1972 qualifying campaign as they were drawn in Group 5 with Portugal, Scotland and Denmark. They won all of their first 4 games and finished the season at the top of Group 5, 2 points ahead of Portugal with 2 matches to go.

== Overview ==
At the end of the season, R Charleroi SC and ARA La Gantoise were relegated to the Division II, to be replaced by KSV Cercle Brugge and KV Mechelen from Division II.
The bottom 2 clubs in Division II (ASV Oostende KM and KSV Sottegem) were relegated to Division III, to be replaced by KSK Tongeren and K Boom FC from Division III.
The bottom club of each Division III league (VC Westerlo, RC Tirlemont, Kortrijk Sport and R Jet de Bruxelles) were relegated to the Promotion, to be replaced by R Herve FC, Wavre Sports, K Helzold FC and KSC Lokeren from Promotion.

== National team ==
Date	Venue	Opponents	Score	Comp	Belgium scorers
November 15, 1970	Heysel Stadium, Brussels (H)	France	1-2	F	Wilfried Van Moer
November 25, 1970	Klokke Stadion, Bruges (H)	Denmark	2-0	ECQ	Johan Devrindt (2)
February 3, 1971	Stade de Sclessin, Liège (H)	Scotland	3-0	ECQ	Ronnie McKinnon (o.g.), Paul Van Himst (2)
February 17, 1971	Stade Emile Versé, Brussels (H)	Portugal	3-0	ECQ	Raoul Lambert (2), André Denul
May 20, 1971	Stade Municipal, Luxembourg (A)	Luxembourg	4-0	F	André Denul, Paul Van Himst, Léon Semmeling, Wilfried Van Moer
May 26, 1971	Idrætspark, Copenhagen (A)	Denmark	2-1	ECQ	Johan Devrindt (2)

Key

- H = Home match
- A = Away match
- N = On neutral ground
- F = Friendly
- ECQ = European Championship qualification
- o.g. = own goal

== European competitions ==
Standard Club Liégeois beat Rosenborg BK of Norway in the first round of the 1970–71 European Champion Clubs' Cup (won 2–0 away, 5–0 at home) but lost in the second round to Legia Warsaw of Poland (won 1–0 at home, lost 0–2 away).

RFC Brugeois eliminated Kickers Offenbach of West Germany in the first round of the 1970–71 European Cup Winners' Cup (lost 1–2 away, won 2–0 at home) and FC Zürich of Switzerland in the second round (won 2–0 at home, lost 1–2 away). In the quarter-finals, Bruges lost to future winner Chelsea FC after extra time (won 2–0 at home, lost 0–4 away).

The 3 Belgian clubs who entered the 1970–71 Inter-Cities Fairs Cup were ARA La Gantoise, RSC Anderlechtois and KSK Beveren.
In the first round, RSC Anderlechtois beat NK Željezničar of Yugoslavia (won 4–3 away, 5–4 at home) and KSK Beveren beat Wiener Sportclub of Austria (won 2–0 away, 3–0 at home), but ARA La Gantoise lost to Hamburger SV of West Germany (lost 0–1 at home, 1–7 away).
In the second round, RSC Anderlechtois beat Akademisk Boldklub of Denmark (won 3–1 away, 4–0 at home), while KSK Beveren beat Valencia CF of Spain (won 1–0 away, drew 1–1 at home).
Both clubs exited at the third round, RSC Anderlechtois to Vitoria FC of Portugal (won 2–1 at home, lost 1–3 away after extra time) and KSK Beveren to Arsenal FC (lost 0–4 away, drew 0–0 at home).

== Honours ==
Competition	Winner
Division I	Standard Club Liégeois
Cup	K Beerschot VAV
Division II	KSV Cercle Brugge
Division III	KSK Tongeren and K Boom FC
Promotion	R Herve FC, Wavre Sports, K Helzold FC and KSC Lokeren

== Final league tables ==
=== Premier Division ===
- 1970-71 Top scorer: West German Erwin Kostedde (Standard Club Liégeois) with 26 goals
- 1970 Golden Shoe: Wilfried Van Moer (Standard Club Liégeois)
