= Roger Henrotay =

Belgian footballer

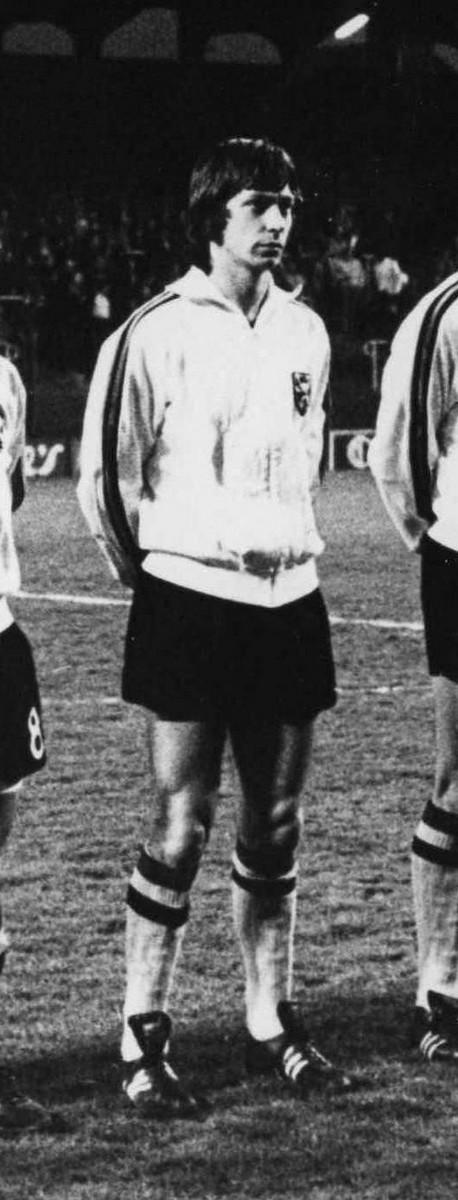
- Roger Henrotay with the Belgium national team.

Personal information
- Date of birth: 28 May 1949 (age 77)
- Place of birth: Vivegnis, Belgium
- Position: Midfielder

Youth career
- 1958–1968: Standard Liège

Senior career*
Years	Team	Apps	(Gls)
1968–1975	Standard Liège	163	(39)
1975–1976	Charleroi	25	(8)
1976–1979	Lokeren	75	(18)
1979–1984	Liège	112	(30)

International career
1974–1975	Belgium	5	(1)
- * Club domestic league appearances and goals

Roger Henrotay (born 28 May 1949) is a retired Belgian footballer from Vivegnis, Liège, Belgium. He was an offensive midfielder in the Standard Liège team of the 1970s, and a Belgian International player.

Henrotay was also the sports manager of Standard Liège between April 1988 and January 1997.

== Honours ==
=== Player ===
==== Club ====
Standard Liège

- Belgian First Division (3): 1968–69, 1969–70, 1970–71
- Belgian League Cup (1): 1974–75
- Belgian Cup: Runner-up 1971–72, 1972–73

=== Manager ===
Standard Liège

- Belgian Cup (1): 1992–93
