= Jacques Beurlet =

Belgian footballer (1944–2020)

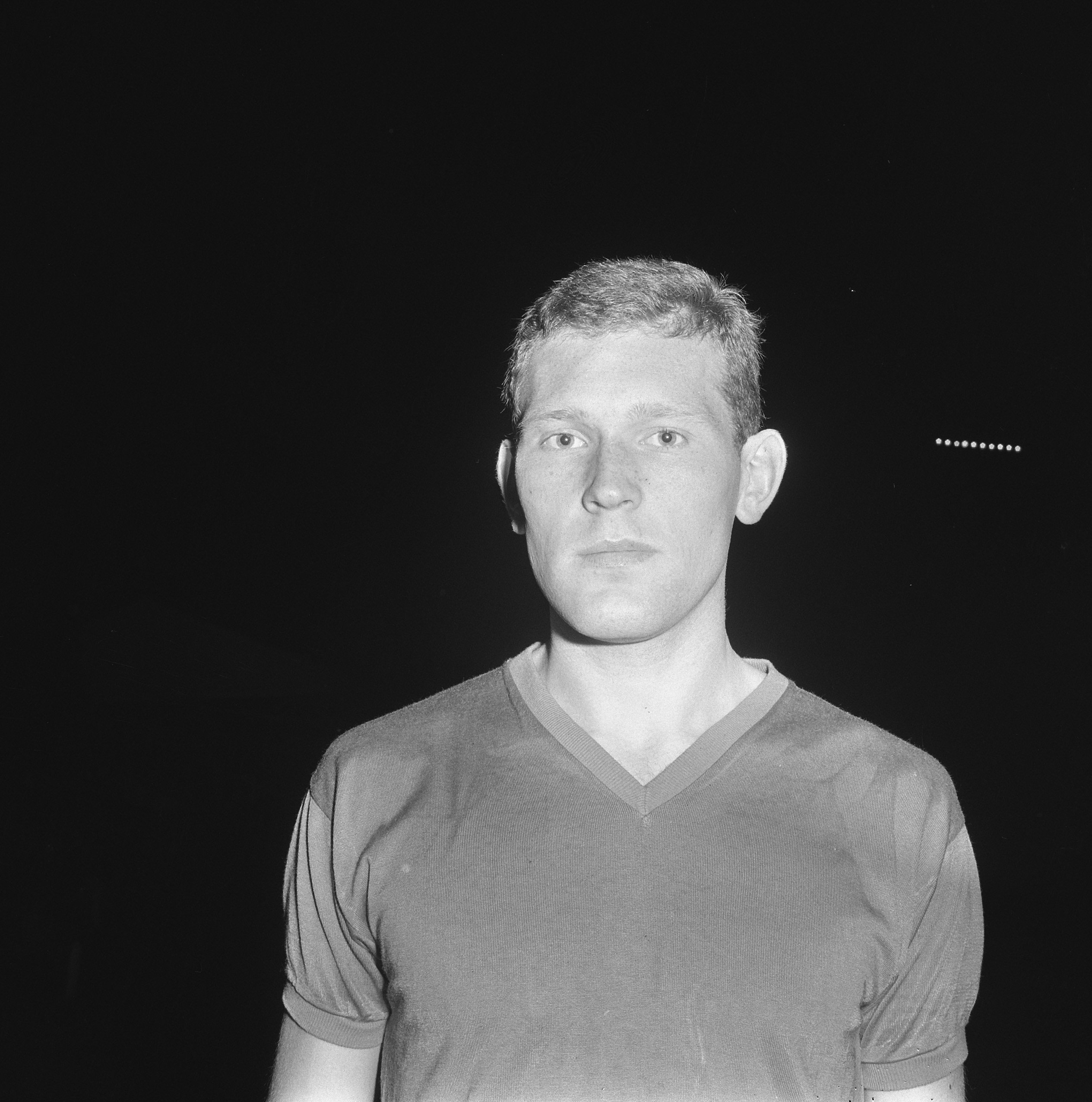
- Beurlet in 1965

Personal information
- Date of birth: 21 December 1944
- Place of birth: Marche-en-Famenne, Belgium
- Date of death: 26 September 2020 (aged 75)
- Place of death: Marche-en-Famenne, Belgium
- Position: Right-back

Senior career*
| Years | Team | Apps | (Gls) |
| 1961–1974 | Standard Liège | | |
| 1974–1975 | Union SG | | |

International career
| 1968–1969 | Belgium | 3 | (0) |
- * Club domestic league appearances and goals

Jacques Beurlet (21 December 1944 – 26 September 2020) was a Belgian footballer who played as a right-back for Standard Liège and Union SG. He earned three caps for the Belgium national team in qualifying matches for the 1970 FIFA World Cup.

== Life ==
Beurlet made 348 appearances for Standard Liège, winning the Belgian First Division in 1962–63, 1968–69, 1969–70 and 1970–71.

He died aged 75 on 26 September 2020.

== Honours ==
Standard Liège

- Belgian First Division: 1962–63, 1968–69, 1969–70, 1970–71
