= Erwin Kostedde =

German footballer

Personal information
- Date of birth: 21 May 1946 (age 80)
- Place of birth: Münster, Germany
- Height: 1.77 m (5 ft 10 in)
- Position: Striker

Senior career*
Years	Team	Apps	(Gls)
1965–1967	Preußen Münster	35	(18)
1967–1968	MSV Duisburg	19	(5)
1968–1971	Standard Liège	52	(43)
1971–1975	Kickers Offenbach	129	(80)
1975–1976	Hertha BSC	26	(14)
1976–1978	Borussia Dortmund	48	(18)
1978	Union Solingen	2	(0)
1978–1979	Standard Liège	15	(6)
1979–1980	Laval	34	(21)
1980–1982	Werder Bremen	75	(38)
1982–1983	VfL Osnabrück	30	(12)
Total		465	(255)

International career
1974–1975	West Germany	3	(0)
- * Club domestic league appearances and goals

Erwin Kostedde (born 21 May 1946) is a German former professional footballer who played as a striker.

== Career ==
The son of a German mother and a Black American father, Kostedde was the first mixed-race player to play for West Germany, and was the top scorer in the Belgian League in 1970–71 and in Ligue 1 in 1979–80. He scored 98 goals in 218 Bundesliga matches.

Kostedde won his first of three caps for West Germany in 1974.

== Personal life ==
In 1990, Kostedde was accused of robbing an amusement hall, and spent six months in prison before being acquitted and receiving DM 3,000 compensation.

In 1994, a fanzine at Kickers Offenbach was started and given the name 'Erwin' in Kostedde's honour. The fanzine lasted for 13 years and produced 65 editions.

In 2021, Kostedde featured in Schwarze Adler, a documentary detailing the experiences of Black players in German professional football.

== Honours ==
Werder Bremen

- 2. Bundesliga North: 1980–81

Standard Liège

- Belgian First Division: 1968–69, 1969–70, 1970–71

Individual

- Belgian First Division top scorer: 1970–71 (26 goals)
- Ligue 1 top scorer: 1979–80 (21 goals)
- Bundesliga goal of the year: 1974
- City of Bremen sportsman of the year: 1981
- Standard Liège Hall of Fame: 2024

Preceded by Günter Netzer	Goal of the year award in Germany; 1974	Succeeded by Klaus Fischer
