= Maurice Grisard =

Belgian footballer and coach

Personal information
- Date of birth: 2 May 1895
- Place of birth: Belgium
- Date of death: Unknown
- Position: Defender

Senior career*
| Years | Team | Apps | (Gls) |
| 1912–1925 | Standard de Liège | 20 | (0) |

Managerial career
- 1925–1926: Royal Dolhain F.C.
- 1926–1927: Fléron F.C.
- 1930–1932: Standard de Liège
- 1939–1940: Standard de Liège
- 1951–1953: Standard de Liège
- 1957–1959: Royal Spa F.C.
- * Club domestic league appearances and goals

Maurice Grisard (born 2 May 1895, date of death unknown) was a Belgian footballer and coach.

== Honours ==
- Belgian D2 winners in : 1919

== Coach career ==
- 1925–1926: Royal Dolhain F.C.
- 1926–1927: Fléron F.C.
- 1930–1932: Standard de Liège
- 1939–1940: Standard de Liège
- 1951–1952: Standard de Liège with Antoine Basleer
- 1952–1953: Standard de Liège
- 1957–1959: Royal Spa F.C.
