= Standard Liège =

Belgian association football club

Standard de Liège
- Full name: Royal Standard de Liège
- Nickname: Les Rouches (The Reds)
- Founded: 1898; 128 years ago
- Ground: Stade Maurice Dufrasne
- Capacity: 27,670
- Owner: Giacomo Angelini
- Head coach: Vincent Euvrard
- League: Belgian Pro League
- 2025–26: Belgian Pro League, 8th of 16
- Website: www.standard.be
Home colours	Away colours	Third colours

Royal Standard de Liège, commonly referred to as Standard Liège, is a Belgian professional football club based in the city of Liège.

They are one of the most successful clubs in Belgium, having won the Belgian league on ten occasions, most recently in 2007–08 and 2008–09. They have been in the top flight without interruption since 1921, longer than any other Belgian side. They have also won eight Belgian Cups, and in 1981–82 they reached the final of the European Cup Winners' Cup, which they lost 2–1 against Barcelona.

Standard players are nicknamed les Rouches [le ʁuʃ] because of their red jerseys. The French word for red, rouge, when pronounced with a Liège accent, sounds like rouche.

In March 2022, Standard Liège was acquired by US-based private investment firm 777 Partners. In October 2024 it was announced that 777 Partners were declared bankrupt by a London court, making the future ownership unclear at the time. Later on, the club was acquired by Belgo-Italian businessman and financial expert Giacomo Angelini through his SDL Holding.

== History ==
On the first day of school in September 1898, the pupils of Collège Saint-Servais in Liège started a football club, which they called Standard of Liège in reference to Standard Athletic Club of Paris. Standard, whose official name is Royal Standard Club of Liège, was based in Cointe and Grivegnée before settling permanently in 1909 in Sclessin, an industrial neighbourhood in Liège. Standard initially joined the Belgian First League in 1909 before returning to the lower leagues a few years later. The club then gained promotion back to the top division in 1921 and has never been relegated since.

Club crest from 1923–1952

Shortly after World War II, Roger Petit, a former player and team captain, became general secretary of the club. Petit worked alongside President Henrard Paul to establish Standard among the elite of Belgian football. In 1954, Standard won their first club trophy, the Belgian Cup, which was soon followed by a first national title in 1957–58.

At European level, in the 1960s, the club reached the semi-finals of the European Cup in 1961–62, falling to beaten finalists Real Madrid 0–6 on aggregate, and the same stage of the Cup Winners' Cup in the year 1966–67, losing to eventual champions Bayern Munich.

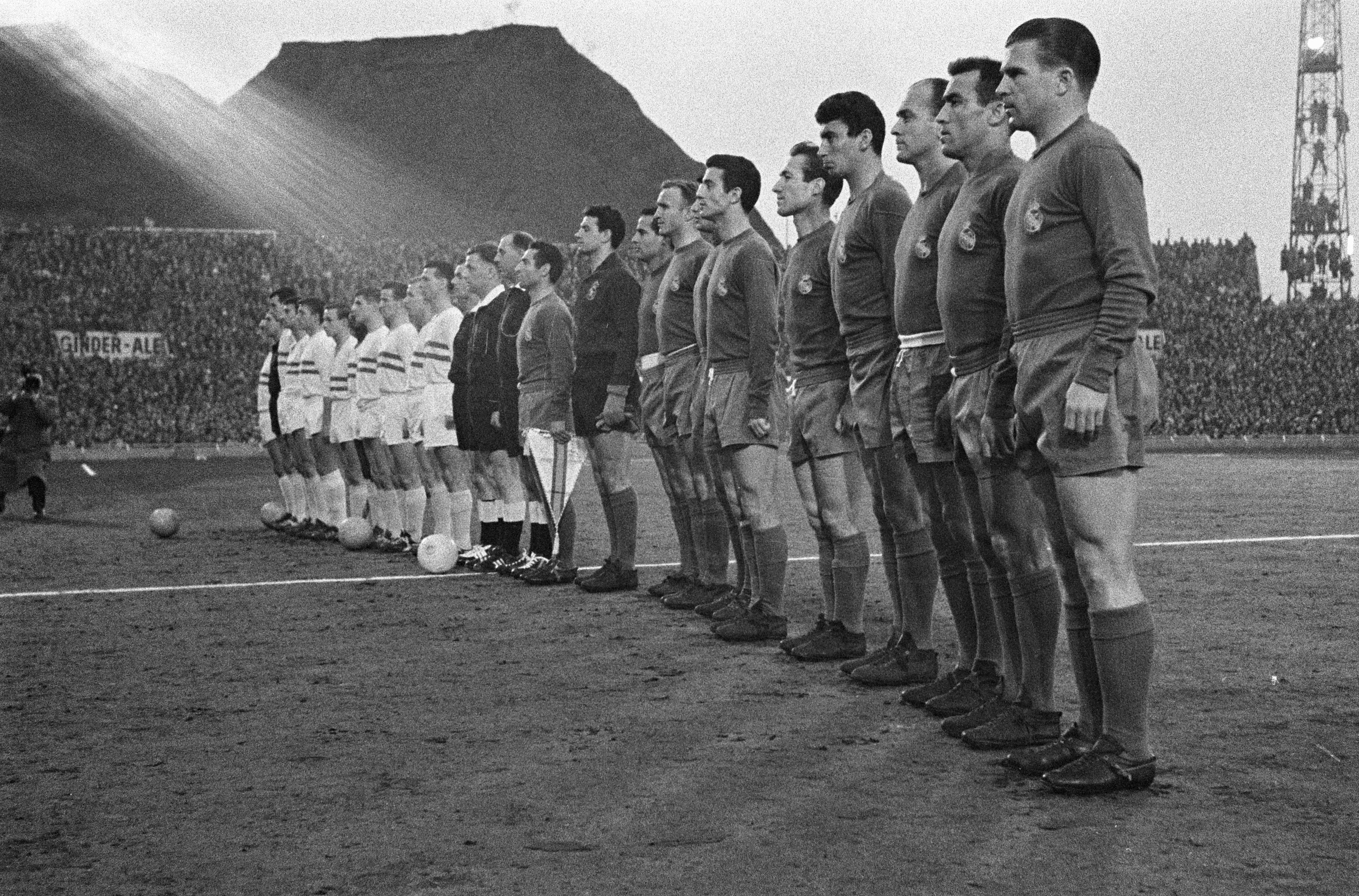
Standard faced Real Madrid in the semi-finals of the 1961–62 European Cup.

The 1960s and early 1970s brought much success to the club, as Standard won six Belgian First Division titles, two Belgian Cups and a League Cup.

Driven by the Austrian Ernst Happel, Standard won the Belgian Cup again in 1981. The following year, Raymond Goethals took control of the team. Playing by the "Raymond Science" philosophy of football, the club was twice the champions of Belgium, twice winners of the Belgian Supercup (in three appearances) and reached the final of the European Cup Winners' Cup in 1982. Standard played against Barcelona in the final at the Camp Nou on 12 May 1982, losing the match 1–2 to the Spaniards.

In 1984, these exploits were tainted by the revelation of the Standard-Waterschei Affair. Just days before the match against Barcelona, to secure the championship of Belgium and guard against last minute injuries, Standard had approached Roland Janssen, the captain of Thor Waterschei, to ensure that Thor players threw the final game of the season. This scandal involved several players, including Eric Gerets, and coach Raymond Goethals, who fled to Portugal to escape suspension. In compensation the Standard players gave their game bonuses to the Waterschei players. Following the scandal, Standard was deprived of many of its playing staff due to long-term suspensions and it took the club several years to recover from the incident.

On 6 June 1993, Standard won the Belgian Cup for the fifth time in its history, defeating Robert Waseige's Charleroi at the Constant Vanden Stock Stadium in Brussels. This led to another appearance in the UEFA Cup Winners' Cup, ending in a record 10–0 aggregate defeat to Arsenal— having lost 3–0 at Highbury in London, Standard were humiliated 0–7 in the second leg at home.

Following the scandal of 1982, it took 25 years before Standard won the Belgium Championship again, lifting the title on 20 April 2008. The club won the Belgian league again the following year, securing the club's tenth league title on 24 May 2009 after a home-and-away game against rivals Anderlecht. Standard won the national cup once more in 2011, defeating Westerlo 2–0 in the final at the King Baudouin Stadium on 21 May 2011. The club was bought by businessman Roland Duchatelet on 23 June 2011, who then took over English club Charlton in December 2013, creating an affiliation between the two clubs.

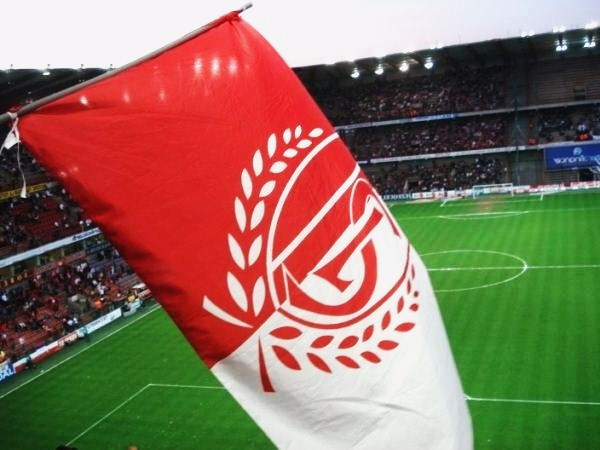
Flag waving at the Stade Maurice Dufrasne

On 20 October 2014, Guy Luzon resigned as manager of Standard with the club sitting in 12th position in the Pro League standings and having taken only two points from three UEFA Europa League matches. Luzon later became head coach of Charlton. Assistant and former midfielder Ivan Vukomanović took over as caretaker-manager.

=== Golden Shoe ===
On nine occasions, Standard players have won the Belgian Golden Shoe as the best player in the domestic league. Jean Nicolay won the award in 1963, Wilfried Van Moer in 1969 and 1970, Christian Piot in 1972, Eric Gerets in 1982, Sérgio Conceição in 2005, Steven Defour in 2007, Axel Witsel in 2008 and Milan Jovanović in 2009.

== Stadium ==
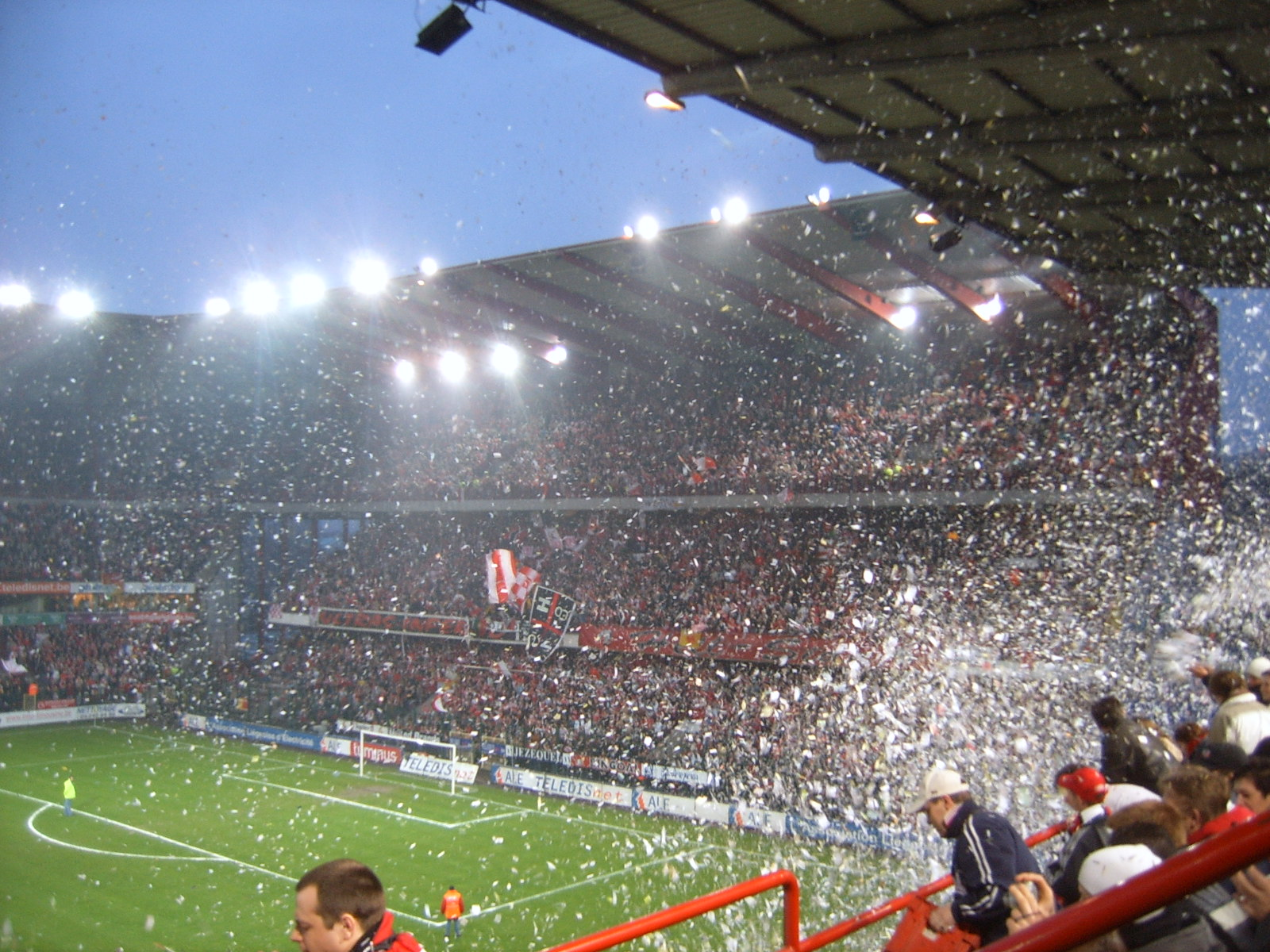
The stadium before a game in the 2005–06 season.

The stadium is popularly called Sclessin. That is not the official name, but Stade Maurice Dufrasne. Sclessin is the district where the stadium is located. Maurice Dufrasne was the fifth chairman of Standard. He was also the driving force behind the move of Standard from Grivegnée to Sclessin. It was opened in 1909. Initially it was just a field, players had to change in a nearby pub.

A year later a first stand was built. By 1924 the club could accommodate 24,000 spectators. Around 1970 it reached its maximum capacity with 43,000 spectators.

Sclessin received a new main stand in 1985, and seven years later, in 1992, works started on the stand at the opposite side. Both ends got redeveloped in the late 1990s in preparation of the Euro 2000 tournament.

== Rivalries ==
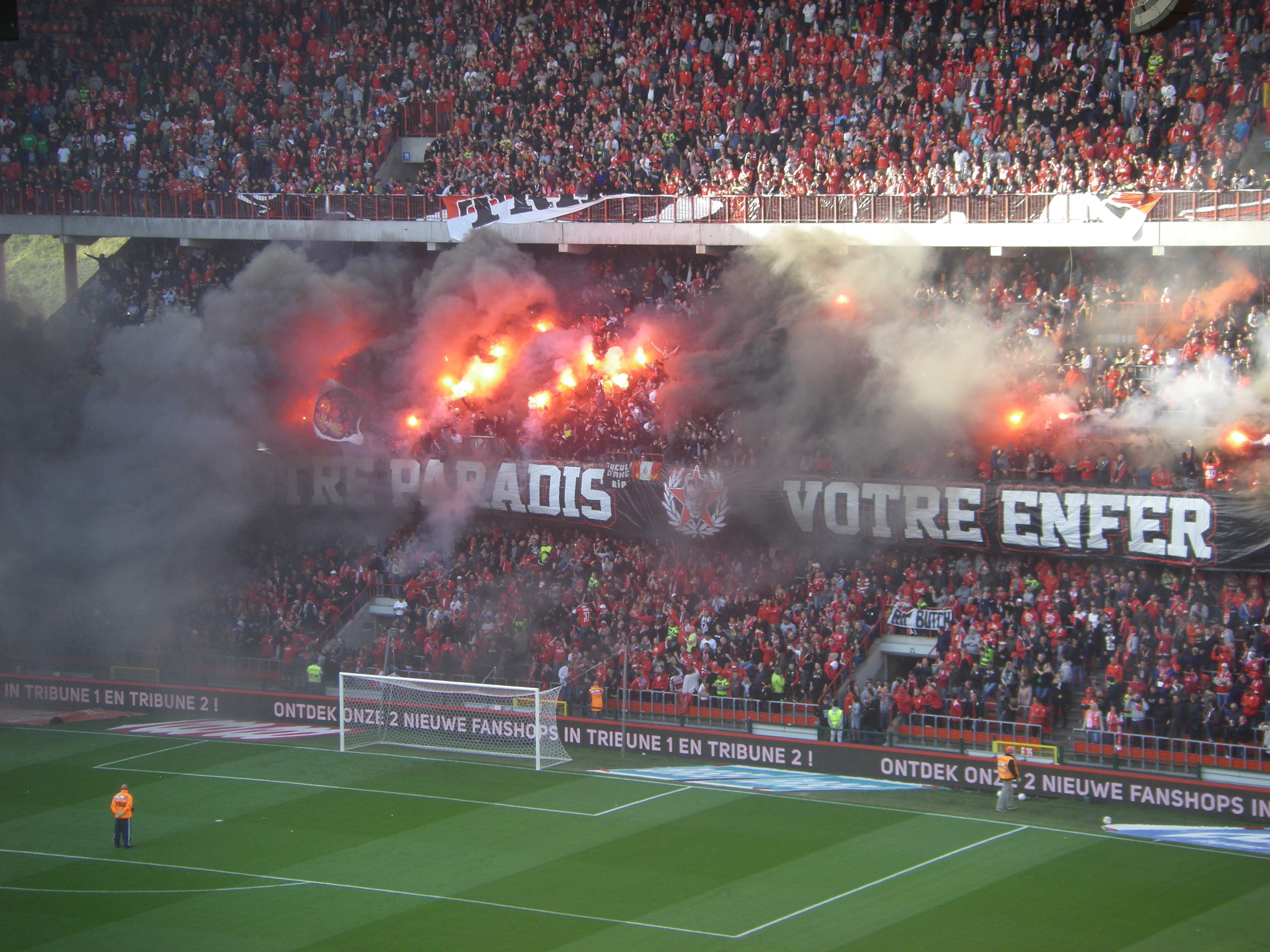
Standard fan group, prior to a 2017 derby match against Royal Charleroi.

Standard Liège supporters share a fierce rivalry with RSC Anderlecht, dubbed the Belgian "Clasico". The rivalry not only reflects the traditional geographical one between the two cities of Liège and Brussels, but also a class divide, with Anderlecht being perceived as the team of the bourgeois elite and Standard, based in an industrial district, as the workers club. The two teams were also the two most successful teams in Belgium for long periods until the emergence of Club Brugge. Many players have played for both clubs, most notably Standard title winning captain Steven Defour, who when returning to Sclessin under Anderlecht's purple colours was greeted with a large tifo with his head decapitated.

Standard also has a traditional city derbies with RFC Seraing and RFC Liège. In recent years, they have also developed a rivalry with fellow Walloon club Sporting Charleroi, with several matches having been stopped due to crowd disturbances between the two sets of supporters.

Matches with Limburgish clubs Racing Genk and STVV also are characterised with heightened tensions. This is due to the proximity of Genk and Sint-Truiden with the city of Liège and the historical ties of the mining and steel industries of these regions in Belgium. The rivalry between Standard and Racing Genk was fueled by the events of 17 May 2011. In this title match Standard winger Mehdi Carcela was hit in the face with a tackle by Genk defender Chris Mavinga. Carcela lost consciousness and was subbed off. Mavinga was not sent off after his reckless intervention. Genk went on to win the title with 1–1 draw, but it left many Standard fans with a sour taste.

== Honours ==
Standard Liège honours
Type	Competition	Titles	Seasons	Ref.
Domestic	Belgian Pro League	10	1957–58, 1960–61, 1962–63, 1968–69, 1969–70, 1970–71, 1981–82, 1982–83, 2007–08, 2008–09	
Domestic	Belgian Cup	8	1953–54, 1965–66, 1966–67, 1980–81, 1992–93, 2010–11, 2015–16, 2017–18	
Domestic	Belgian League Cup	1	1975	
Domestic	Belgian Supercup	4	1981, 1983, 2008, 2009	

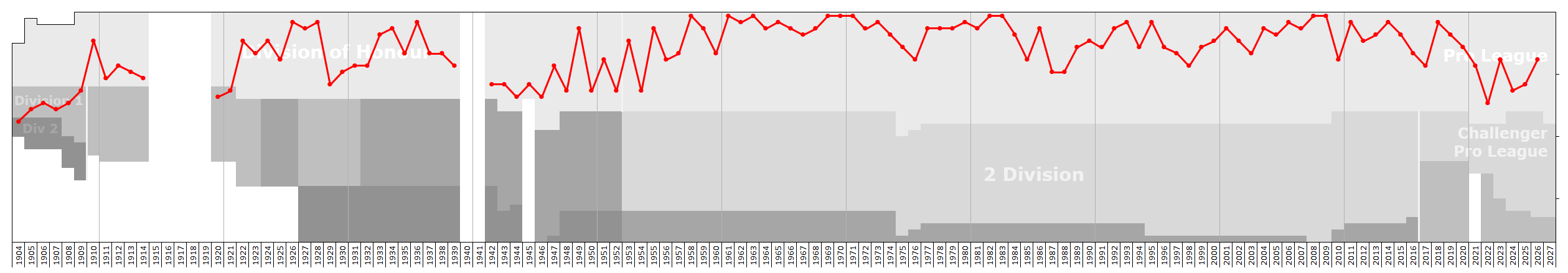
Historical chart of Standard Liege league performance

=== Continental ===
- UEFA Cup Winners' Cup
  - Runners-up (1): 1981–82
- UEFA Intertoto Cup
  - Runners-up (1): 1996

=== Invitational ===
- Trofeo Costa del Sol:
  - Runners-up (1): 1965
- Trofeo Ciudad de Palma:
  - Runners-up (1): 1969
- Tournoi de Paris:
  - Runners-up (1): 1980
- Amsterdam Tournament:
  - Runners-up (1): 1981
- Trofeo Santiago Bernabéu:
  - Runners-up (1): 1982
- Mohammed V Cup:
  - Champions (1): 1986
- Tournoi de Casablanca:
  - Champions (1): 1987
- Feyenoord Tournament:
  - Champions (1): 1987, Runners-up (1): 1983
- Philips Stayen Cup:
  - Champions (1): 2014

=== Individual ===
- Belgian First Division topscorer
  - Lucien Fabry (1927), Jean Mathonet (1956), Roger Claessen (1968), Antal Nagy (1969), Erwin Kostedde (1971), Harald Nickel (1978), Aurelio Vidmar (1995)

== Awards ==
=== Individual ===
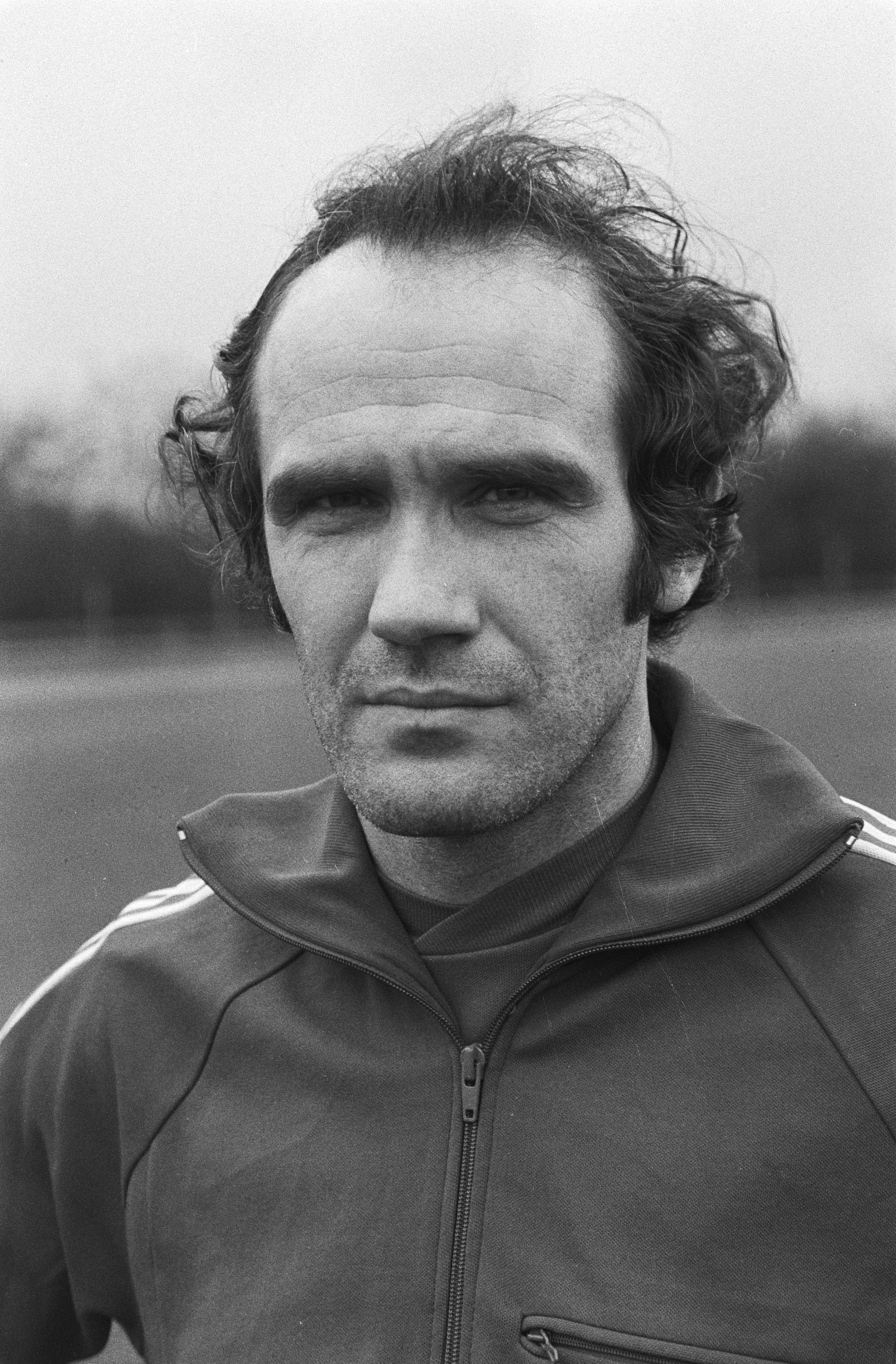
Wilfried Van Moer won the Belgian Golden Shoe twice (1969 and 1970)

- Belgian Golden Shoe
  - Jean Nicolay (1963), Wilfried Van Moer (1969, 1970), Christian Piot (1972), Eric Gerets (1982), Sérgio Conceição (2005), Steven Defour (2007), Axel Witsel (2008), Milan Jovanović (2009)
- Belgian Professional Footballer of the Season
  - Milan Jovanović (2008)
- Belgian Professional Manager of the Season
  - Robert Waseige (1995), Michel Preud'homme (2008), László Bölöni (2009)
- Belgian Young Professional Footballer of the Season
  - Michaël Goossens (1993), Axel Witsel (2008)
- Belgian Professional Goalkeeper of the Season
  - Gilbert Bodart (1985, 1986, 1992, 1995), Vedran Runje (1999, 2001, 2006)
- Ebony Shoe
  - Marouane Fellaini (2007), Michy Batshuayi (2014)
- Belgian Lion Award
  - Mehdi Carcela (2015, 2018, 2019), Ishak Belfodil (2017), Selim Amallah (2020)

== European record ==
Competition	A	GP	W	D	L	GF	GA
European Cup / UEFA Champions League	14	58	25	10	23	87	73
UEFA Cup Winners' Cup	6	36	19	5	12	68	49
UEFA Cup / UEFA Europa League	23	139	59	35	45	193	182
UEFA Intertoto Cup	3	20	8	10	2	25	16

A = appearances, GP = games played, W = won, D = drawn, L = lost, GF = goals for, GA = goals against.

=== Summary of best results ===
From the quarter-finals upwards:

- European Cup/UEFA Champions League:

Semifinalists in 1962
Quarterfinalists in 1959, 1970 and 1972

- UEFA Cup Winners' Cup (1):

Runners-up in 1982
Semifinalists in 1967
Quarterfinalists in 1968

- UEFA Cup/UEFA Europa League:

Quarterfinalists in 1981 and 2010

- UEFA Intertoto Cup (1):

Runners-up in 1996
Semifinalists in 2000

=== UEFA coefficient ===
Correct as of 21 May 2025.

Rank	Team	Points
140	(Estonia) FC Flora	11.500
141	(Belgium) K.R.C. Genk	11.370
142	(Belgium) Standard Liège	11.370
143	(Belgium) Royal Charleroi S.C.	11.370
144	(Cyprus) Pafos FC	11.250

== Players ==
=== Current squad ===
As of 8 September 2026

Note: Flags indicate national team as defined under FIFA eligibility rules; some limited exceptions apply. Players may hold more than one non-FIFA nationality.

No.	Pos.	Nation	Player
1	GK	COD	Matthieu Epolo
3	DF	DEN	Gustav Mortensen
4	DF	BEL	Dimitri Lavalée
6	MF	BEL	Laurens Goemaere
7	MF	GER	Tobias Mohr
9	FW	SUI	Andi Zeqiri (on loan from Widzew Łódź)
10	FW	IRI	Dennis Eckert
11	FW	BEL	Adnane Abid
13	DF	USA	Marlon Fossey (captain)
15	FW	GAM	Salieu Drammeh
17	FW	CMR	Bernard Nguene
18	DF	ENG	Henry Lawrence
19	FW	BUL	Sylvester Jasper
20	DF	FRA	Ibrahim Karamoko

No.	Pos.	Nation	Player
21	GK	BEL	Lucas Pirard
22	MF	FRA	Alexis Trouillet
23	MF	MAD	Marco Ilaimaharitra
24	DF	TOG	Josué Homawoo
25	DF	BEL	Ibe Hautekiet
27	MF	MAR	Mohamed El Hankouri
29	DF	BEL	Daan Dierckx
34	DF	BEL	Noah Sy
35	GK	BIH	Belmin Dizdarević
77	FW	BEL	Bruny Nsimba
80	MF	CMR	Ryan Fosso
84	MF	MAR	Rayan Touzghar
94	MF	DEN	Casper Nielsen

=== SL16 FC ===
SL16 FC is the reserve/U23 squad of Standard that plays in the third-tier Belgian National Division 1.

As of 31 August 2026

Note: Flags indicate national team as defined under FIFA eligibility rules; some limited exceptions apply. Players may hold more than one non-FIFA nationality.

No.	Pos.	Nation	Player
1	GK	BEL	Tom Poitoux
3	DF	RWA	Darryl Nkulikiyimana
4	DF	NGR	Quadri Sule Lekan
5	DF	BEL	Yanis Malamba
6	DF	BEL	Diego Da Silva Sousa
10	FW	FRA	Antoine Mazure
15	FW	BEL	Yann Gboua
16	GK	BEL	Quentin Durka
17	MF	BEL	Amine Tabet Benslimane
18	MF	BEL	Wiene Creemers
19	FW	BEL	Yhanis Onehese

No.	Pos.	Nation	Player
20	MF	BEL	Jasper Palstermans
21	FW	BEL	Josué Mbuyi
22	DF	BEL	Kjell Vanherf
23	MF	BEL	Onésime Kalonji
24	DF	BEL	Diesse Kasuku
25	MF	BEL	N'famory Traore
27	DF	BEL	Ange-Gabriel Kokora
29	FW	FRA	Farès Boujlifa
31	MF	BEL	Jordi Makiese
33	MF	BEL	Charli Spoden
34	MF	MAR	Anas Hammas
37	MF	BEL	Bradley Nam James

=== Out on loan ===
Note: Flags indicate national team as defined under FIFA eligibility rules; some limited exceptions apply. Players may hold more than one non-FIFA nationality.

No.	Pos.	Nation	Player
—	DF	BEL	Steeven Assengue (at Virton until 30 June 2027)
—	DF	CRO	Boško Šutalo (at Aris until 30 June 2027)

No.	Pos.	Nation	Player
—	FW	FRA	Timothé Nkada (at Troyes until 30 June 2027)

== Notable players ==
=== Most appearances ===
Rank	Player	Standard career	Apps
1	(Luxembourg) Guy Hellers	1983–2000	474
2	(Belgium) Gilbert Bodart	1981–96, 1997–98	469
3	(Belgium) Guy Vandersmissen	1978–91	465
4	(Belgium) Léon Semmeling	1959–74	449

=== Most goals ===
Rank	Player	Standard career	Goals (App.)
1	(Belgium) Jean Capelle	1929–44	245 (285)
2	(Belgium) Roger Claessen	1956–68	161 (229)
3	(Belgium) Maurice Gillis	1919–35	124 (275)

=== Standard Liège Hall of Fame ===
Next players were introduced into the Standard Liège Hall of Fame:

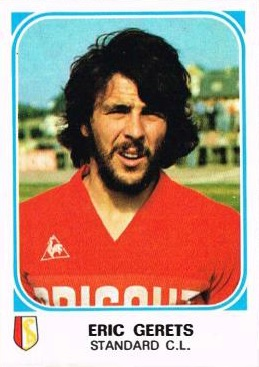
Club icon Eric Gerets pictured in 1976

- (Belgium) Jacques Beurlet (1961–1974)
- (Belgium) Gilbert Bodart (1981–1996, 1997–1998)
- (Republic of the Congo) Paul Bonga Bonga (1957–1963)
- (Belgium) Jean Capelle (1929–1944)
- (Belgium) Roger Claessen (1958–1968)
- (Brazil) André Cruz (1990–1994, 1999)
- (Belgium) Nicolas Dewalque (1963–1976)
- (Socialist Federal Republic of Yugoslavia) Milan Galić (1966–1970)
- (Belgium) Eric Gerets (1971–1983)
- (Belgium) Maurice Gillis (1919–1935)
- (Belgium) Michaël Goossens (1990–1996, 2000–2003)
- (Belgium) Patrick Van Minsel (1986-1988)
- (Luxembourg) Guy Hellers (1983–2000)
- (Belgium) Denis Houf (1948–1964)
- (West Germany) Erwin Kostedde (1968–1971, 1978–1979)
- (Belgium) Fernand Massay (1937–1953)
- (Belgium) Jean Mathonet (1945–1960)
- (Belgium) Jean Nicolay (1956–1969)
- (Luxembourg) Louis Pilot (1961–1972)
- (Belgium) Christian Piot (1966–1978)
- (Belgium) André Piters (1951–1961)
- (France) André Riou (1953–1958)
- (Belgium) Léon Semmeling (1959–1974)
- (Iceland) Ásgeir Sigurvinsson (1973–1981)
- (Netherlands) Simon Tahamata (1980–1984)
- (Hungary) István Sztáni (1960–1965)
- (Belgium) Guy Vandersmissen (1977–1991)
- (Belgium) Wilfried Van Moer (1968–1976)
- (Belgium) Marc Wilmots (1991–1996)

=== Captains ===
Player's name in bold when Standard won the title

- 1939–43: (Belgium) Roger Petit
- 1943–53: (Belgium) Fernand Massay
- 1953–54: (Belgium) Fernand Blaise
- 1954–55:
- 1955–56:
- 1956–57:
- 1957–62: **(Belgium) Denis Houf**
- 1962–63:
- 1963–64: (Belgium) Marcel Paeschen
- 1964–65: (Belgium) Jean Nicolay
- 1965–66: (Belgium) Lucien Spronck
- 1966–72: **(Belgium) Léon Semmeling**
- 1972–74: (Belgium) Jean Thissen

- 1974–76: (Belgium) Wilfried Van Moer
- 1976–77:
- 1977–78:
- 1978–79:
- 1979–80:
- 1980–83: (Belgium) Eric Gerets
- 1983–84:
- 1984–85:
- 1985–86:
- 1986–87:
- 1987–88:
- 1988–90: (Belgium) Guy Vandersmissen
- 1990–91:

- 1991–92:
- 1992–96: (Belgium) Gilbert Bodart
- 1996–99: (Luxembourg) Guy Hellers
- 1999–02: (Belgium) Didier Ernst
- 2002–04: (Serbia) Ivica Dragutinović
- 2004–05: (Belgium) Eric Deflandre
- 2005–07: (Portugal) Sérgio Conceição
- 2007–11: **(Belgium) Steven Defour**
- 2011–15: (Belgium) Jelle Van Damme
- 2015–16: (France) Adrien Trebel
- 2016–18: (Denmark) Alexander Scholz
- 2018–19: (Belgium) Sébastien Pocognoli
- 2019–21: (Belgium) Zinho Vanheusden

- 2021–22: (Cyprus) Konstantinos Laifis
- 2022–25: (Belgium) Arnaud Bodart

== Club officials ==
Position	Staff
Press Officer	(Belgium) Olivier Smeets
Global Sports Director	(Germany) Johannes Spors
Sporting director	(Republic of Ireland) Fergal Harkin
Head coach	(Romania) Mircea Rednic
Assistant head coachj	(Scotland) Frazer Robertson
First-team coach	(Belgium) Geoffrey Valenne
Goalkeeping coach	(Belgium) Jean-François Gillet
Fitness coach	(France) Léo Djaoui (Belgium) Renaat Philippaerts (Belgium) Kevin Miny
Video analysis manager	(England) Nathan Kirby
Video analyst	(Belgium) Lovic Mandela Sound
Team Doctor	(Belgium) Bertrand Vanden Bulck
Physiotherapist	(Belgium) Ludovic Depreter
Team Manager	(Belgium) Piero Rossi
Player Liaison Officer	(Belgium) Ricardo Carvalho

== Coaches ==
Dates	Name
July 1912 – June 1916	(England) Charles Bunyan, Sr.
July 1916 – June 1922	(Belgium) Camille van Hoorden
July 1922 – June 1924	(England) Lamport (Belgium) Pierre Kogel
July 1924 – June 1930	(England) Percy Wilding Hartley
July 1930 – June 1932	(Belgium) Maurice Grisard
July 1932 – June 1935	(England) Percy Wilding Hartley
July 1935 – June 1936	(Belgium) Jean Dupont
July 1936 – March 1937	(England) Percy Wilding Hartley
April 1937 – Nov 1938	(Belgium) Emile Riff
Dec 1938 – June 1939	(Belgium) Jean Dupont
July 1939 – June 1940	(Belgium) Maurice Grisard
July 1940 – June 1942	(Belgium) René Dohet
July 1942 – June 1945	(Belgium) Fernand Wertz
July 1945 – June 1950	(Belgium) Marcelin Waroux
July 1950 – June 1951	(Belgium) Antoine Basleer
July 1951 – June 1953	(Belgium) Maurice Grisard
July 1953 – June 1958	(France) André Riou
July 1958 – June 1961	(Hungarian People's Republic) Géza Kalocsay

Dates	Name
July 1961 – June 1963	(France) Jean Prouff
July 1963 – Nov 1964	(France) Auguste Jordan
Dec 1964 – June 1968	(Socialist Federal Republic of Yugoslavia) Milorad Pavić
July 1968 – June 1973	(France) René Hauss
July 1973 – Oct 1973	(Socialist Federal Republic of Yugoslavia) Vlatko Marković
Nov 1973 – June 1974	(Socialist Federal Republic of Yugoslavia) Ned Bulatović
July 1974 – Dec 1975	(Netherlands) Cor van der Hart
Jan 1976 – June 1976	(Belgium) Maurice Lempereur (France) Lucien Leduc
July 1976 – June 1979	(Belgium) Robert Waseige
July 1979 – June 1981	(Austria) Ernst Happel
July 1981 – Feb 1984	(Belgium) Raymond Goethals
March 1984 – June 1984	(Belgium) Léon Semmeling
July 1984 – April 1985	(Luxembourg) Louis Pilot
May 1985 – Feb 1987	(Socialist Federal Republic of Yugoslavia) Milorad Pavić
Feb 1986 – June 1987	(Germany) Helmut Graf
July 1987 – Sept 1987	(Belgium) René Desaeyere
Oct 1987 – March 1988	(Socialist Federal Republic of Yugoslavia) Milorad Pavić
April 1988 – June 1988	(Belgium) Jozef Vliers

Dates	Name
July 1988 – June 1989	(Belgium) Urbain Braems
July 1989 – June 1991	(Germany) Georg Kessler
July 1991 – Dec 1993	(Netherlands) Arie Haan
Jan 1994 – June 1994	(Belgium) René Vandereycken
July 1994 – June 1996	(Belgium) Robert Waseige
July 1996 – June 1997	(Belgium) Jos Daerden
Jul 1997 – Oct 1997	(Netherlands) Aad de Mos
Nov 1997 – March 1998	(Belgium) Daniel Boccar
April 1998 – June 1998	(Croatia) Luka Peruzović
July 1998 – Sept 1999	(Croatia) Tomislav Ivić
Oct 1999 – Dec 1999	(Croatia) Željko Mijač
Jan 2000 – May 2000	(Belgium) Jean Thissen (Belgium) Henri Depireux
May 2000 – Dec 2000	(Croatia) Tomislav Ivić
Dec 2000 – Jan 2001	(Belgium) Dominique D'Onofrio (Belgium) Christian Labarbe
Jan 2001 – June 2002	(Belgium) Michel Preud'homme
Jun 2002 – Oct 2002	(Belgium) Robert Waseige
Oct 2002 – June 2006	(Belgium) Dominique D'Onofrio

Dates	Name
Jul 2006 – Sep 2006	(Netherlands) Johan Boskamp
Sept 2006 – June 2008	(Belgium) Michel Preud'homme
June 2008 – Feb 2010	(Romania) László Bölöni
Feb 2010 – June 2011	(Belgium) Dominique D'Onofrio
July 2011 – May 2012	(Belgium) José Riga
May 2012 – Oct 2012	(Netherlands) Ron Jans
Oct 2012 – May 2013	(Romania) Mircea Rednic
May 2013 – Oct 2014	(Israel) Guy Luzon
Nov 2014 – Feb 2015	(Serbia) Ivan Vukomanović
Feb 2015 – Jun 2015	(Belgium) José Riga
Jun 2015 – Aug 2015	(Serbia) Slavoljub Muslin
Sep 2015 – Sep 2016	(Belgium) Yannick Ferrera
Sep 2016 – Apr 2017	(Serbia) Aleksandar Janković
Apr 2017 – May 2017	(Belgium) José Jeunechamps
June 2017 – May 2018	(Portugal) Ricardo Sá Pinto
June 2018 – Jun 2020	(Belgium) Michel Preud'homme
June 2020 – Dec 2020	(France) Philippe Montanier
Dec 2020 – Oct 2021	(Senegal) Mbaye Leye
Oct 2021 – April 2022	(Slovenia) Luka Elsner
June 2022 – June 2023	(Norway) Ronny Deila
June 2023 – December 2023	(Belgium) Carl Hoefkens
January 2024 – present	(Croatia) Ivan Leko

== Cultural references ==
Standard Liège are mentioned in the song "This One's for Now" by the band Half Man Half Biscuit on the album Urge for Offal.
