= Royale Union Limbourg FC =

Belgian football club

Union Limbourg
- Full name: Royale Union Limbourg Football Club
- Founded: 1898; 128 years ago (as Dolhain FC)
- Ground: Stade Lambert Fourir, Limbourg
- Capacity: 3,000
- Manager: Cédric Flon
- League: Third Provincial Liège
- 2024–25: Fourth Provincial Liège E, 1st (promoted)
Home colours

Royale Union Limbourg Football Club, commonly known as Union Limbourg, is a Belgian football club from Limbourg in the Liège Province. The club traces its origins to Dolhain FC, founded in 1898, and plays under matricule 9 of the Royal Belgian Football Association: one of the lowest still in active use. It plays in the provincial leagues of Liège.

== History ==
=== Dolhain FC (1898–1923) ===
The club was founded in 1898 as Dolhain FC, established by officials from Verviers FC, the nearest established football club. At the time, Liège FC was Dolhain's only other near neighbour in the sport, with most Belgian football activity concentrated in Brussels and Antwerp. The first ground was on land later occupied by the municipal depot and fire station; an old beech tree stood in the middle of the pitch and was regarded as a "tolerated foreign object" before later moves to grounds behind Château Peltzer, and subsequently to the Ordibel and Carlier sites.

=== Société Royale Dolhain FC and the national-series years (1923–1967) ===
The club received its royal title in 1923 and was renamed Société Royale Dolhain FC. Promoted to the national second tier the same year as part of an expansion of the Promotion division, Dolhain finished fifth of 14 in 1923–24. A 1–0 home win that season over the eventual champions, SC Anderlechtois—watched by some 2,000 visiting supporters from Brussels—remains a landmark in the club's history.

=== Royal Dolhain FC (1967–2014) ===
Logo of Royal Dolhain (1967–2014)

By the late 1960s the club had adopted the modern name Royal Dolhain FC. It returned to the Promotion in 1967–68 under coach Jean Peters but lasted only one season at that level, and was relegated alongside Tongerse SV Cercle and Union Hutoise. Dolhain came close to promotion again in 1970–71 and 1972–73 but lost out, respectively, to Malmedy and Bas-Oha. The club thereafter receded down the provincial ladder, reaching Fourth Provincial by 2014–15.

=== Merger and Royale Union Limbourg FC (2014–) ===
In December 2013, Royal Dolhain announced that it would merge at the end of the 2013–14 season with FC Union Espagnole de Dolhain (UED), a 1974-founded club affiliated with the KBVB in 2002 under matricule 9414. Both clubs had been competing in Fourth Provincial Liège. The merged club, named Royale Union Limbourg FC, retained Dolhain's matricule 9; its colours combined Dolhain's blue and black with UED's red. In its first season, home matches were played at the former UED ground while training took place at Dolhain's Stade Lambert Fourir.

In 2017, the club achieved its first promotion to Third Provincial. Following a relegation back to Fourth Provincial, it returned to that level in 2025 after winning Fourth Provincial E, decisive in a 2–1 home win against Bolland B on 30 March 2025.

== Ground ==
Union Limbourg plays its home matches at the Stade Lambert Fourir in Limbourg, formerly known as the Bêverie ground and renamed in 1947 for a long-serving club figure. The stadium has a capacity of approximately 3,000 and incorporates two football pitches, the main pitch having a covered stand added in 1962.

== Honours ==
- Fourth Provincial Liège E
  - Champions: 2024–25
