= Léon Semmeling =

Belgian footballer (1940–2024)

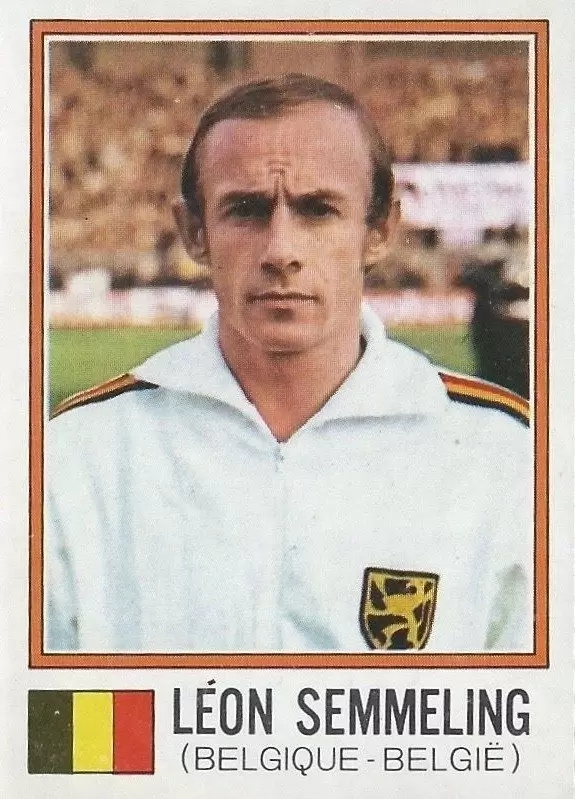
- Semmeling in 1974

Personal information
- Full name: Léon Joseph Semmeling
- Date of birth: 4 January 1940
- Place of birth: Moelingen, Belgium
- Date of death: 14 March 2024 (aged 84)
- Place of death: Liège, Belgium
- Position: Midfielder

Senior career*
Years	Team	Apps	(Gls)
1959–1974	Standard Liège	449	(73)

International career
1961–1973	Belgium	35	(2)

Managerial career
- 1984: Standard Liège
- * Club domestic league appearances and goals

Léon Joseph Semmeling (4 January 1940 – 14 March 2024) was a Belgian footballer who played as a midfielder for Standard Liège. He earned 35 caps for the Belgium national team, and participated in the 1970 FIFA World Cup and UEFA Euro 1972.

Semmeling died on 14 March 2024, at the age of 84.

== Honours ==
Standard Liege

- Belgian First Division: 1960–61, 1962–63, 1968–69, 1969–70, 1970–71
- Belgian Cup: 1965–66, 1966–67
- Jules Pappaert Cup: 1971

Belgium

- UEFA Euro third place: 1972
