= Wilfried Van Moer =

Belgian footballer (1945–2021)

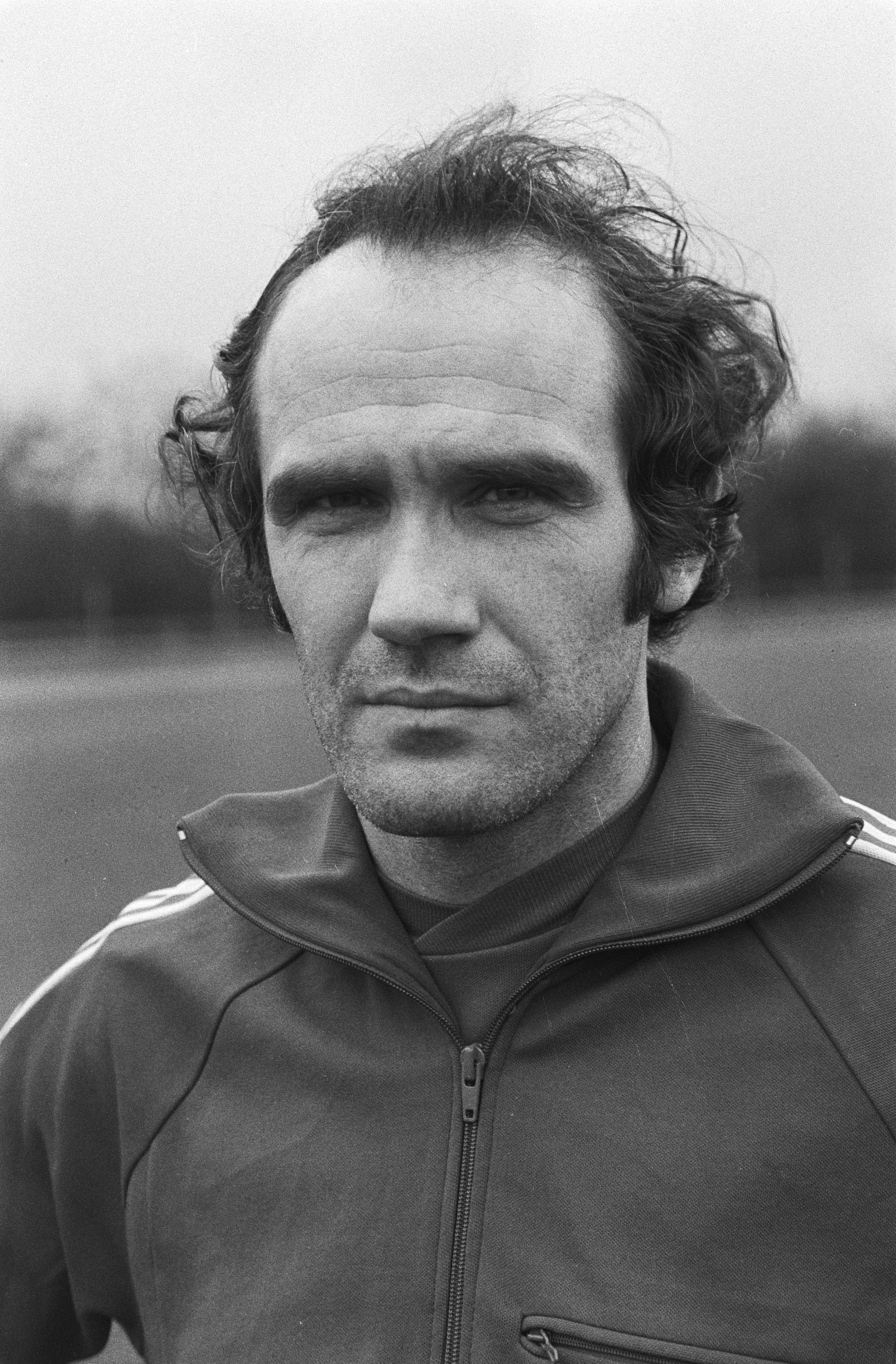
- Van Moer in 1980

Personal information
- Full name: Wilfried Van Moer
- Date of birth: 1 March 1945
- Place of birth: Beveren, Belgium
- Date of death: 24 August 2021 (aged 76)
- Place of death: Leuven, Belgium
- Height: 1.68 m (5 ft 6 in)
- Position: Midfielder

Senior career*
Years	Team	Apps	(Gls)
1960–1965	Beveren	121	(56)
1965–1968	Antwerp	77	(14)
1968–1976	Standard de Liège	170	(24)
1976–1980	Beringen	110	(17)
1980–1982	Beveren	49	(6)
1982–1984	Sint-Truiden	26	(0)
Total		553	(117)

International career
1966–1982	Belgium	57	(9)

Managerial career
- 1996: Belgium
Medal record
Representing Belgium
UEFA European Championship
Runner-up	1980 Italy
- * Club domestic league appearances and goals

Wilfried Van Moer (1 March 1945 – 24 August 2021) was a Belgian footballer who won the Belgian Golden Shoe three times, first in 1966 while at Antwerp then in 1969 and in 1970 while at Standard Liège.

Prior to 1966 Van Moer played with Beveren. He returned to his first club after a spell at Beringen in the early 1980s.

He played 57 times and scored nine goals for the Belgium national team between 1966 and 1982, starting in a 1–0 friendly win against Switzerland on 22 October 1966. Van Moer was in the team for the 1970 and 1982 World Cups and for the Euro 1980 in which Belgium finished second.

== Club career ==
Born in Beveren-Waas, Van Moer began with home town club Beveren-Waas, then in the third tier of the Belgian League. A move to Royal Antwerp in 1965 was influenced not only by a chance to play in the 1st Division, but by the fact he was already working in that city as an electrician. He made his debut for the club in August 1965 against Union Saint-Gilloise. At the end of 1966 he won his first Golden Shoe Award, having won his first international cap earlier that year.

It was during his three years at Antwerp under the guidance of coach Harry Game, that Van Moer, against his wishes, was moved from a wide right role to central midfield, preparing him to eventually succeed to another of Belgium's most celebrated players Jef Jurion, in the national team.

Following relegation for Antwerp in 1968, a protracted move to Standard Liège ensued, Van Moer resisting the interest of 1. FC Köln to remain in Belgium, and also Club Brugge, with whom he had made a personal agreement. The €150,000 fee for the now established international was at the time a Belgian record.

Wonderful domestic success followed at Standard, winning the championship in 1969, 1970 and 1971 and making it a hat-trick of Golden Shoes by winning the award in both 1969 and 1970.

As for his club career, he had left Standard in 1976 and played for the Limburg first division team FC Beringen for a few seasons (he owned a café in the Limburg capital Hasselt). In 1980, after his career had been rekindled, he made a transfer to his original team SK Beveren (which had become Belgian champion in 1979). He stayed there for two more seasons and concluded his career in Limburg again at Sint-Truiden, where he became trainer-player.

== International career ==
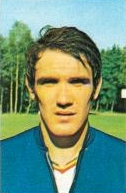
Van Moer with Belgium in 1970

Van Moer was a regular for the Belgium national team, appearing in the 1970 FIFA World Cup and scoring twice in a 3–0 defeat of El Salvador, Belgium's only win in the tournament. Two years later, he played a key role in helping his country qualify for the semi-finals of the UEFA Euro 1972. After Belgium had defended stubbornly in a goalless quarter final, first leg in Italy, he scored the opening goal midway through the first half in the return at Anderlecht's Constant Vanden Stock Stadium. But then something was to happen, putting the Belgian's career on hold. On the stroke of half-time, Mario Bertini's lunge resulted in a broken leg for Van Moer, a bitter-sweet day for the home nation who ultimately celebrated a 2–1 victory.

Although he recovered, the leg-break and other injuries restricted his international appearances over the next three seasons. By October 1979, aged 34, without an appearance for The Red Devils for four and a half years, international football couldn't have been further from his thoughts. But wily Belgian coach Guy Thys had other ideas. Van Moer was an inspired choice for a Belgian side who had forgotten how to win, as they prepared to take on Portugal in a 'do or die' EC qualifier. Van Moer again came up trumps with the first goal in a 2–0 win. Van Moer also performed key roles in home and away victories over Scotland, which propelled Belgium to qualification for the Finals tournament in Italy.

Striker Horst Hrubesch scored two goals in the final, securing victory for West Germany. The Belgian central midfielder Ludo Coeck was also widely noted for his performances during the tournament. He played in most matches, contributing in midfield through ball distribution and possession. Belgium reached the final of a major international tournament. Van Moer finished fourth in the 1980 Ballon d'Or voting, the highest placing by a Belgian player at the time, with Karl-Heinz Rummenigge, Bernd Schuster, and Michel Platini ranked ahead of him.

Van Moer's international career went on for another two years, long enough to appear in another World Cup Finals series. Named captain in the absence of Eric Gerets, for the second-phase game against Poland his international career ended when replaced by François Van der Elst at half-time. Belgium trailed by two at the interval and went on to lose 3–0, Poland's inspiration coming from Zbigniew Boniek who was the only player to score.

== Managerial career ==
After he stopped playing football, he became coach with Sint-Truiden, SK Beveren, Assent and FC Diest, before calling it a day, somewhat disappointed by the general professional level of the Belgian football players.

He was called by the Belgian Football Union to do some prospective work and became assistant coach to national coach Paul Van Himst in 1995 after a few heavy defeats of the Red Devils. He succeeded Van Himst as a head coach in 1996 for five games.

However, people in the Football Union and the press were not very delighted by his lack of communicative skills and at the beginning of 1997, he was, in his turn, replaced by Georges Leekens. He has not taken up any managerial tasks since.

== Death ==
Van Moer suffered a cerebral haemorrhage and died in a hospital in Leuven on 24 August 2021.

== Career statistics ==
Appearances and goals by club, season and competition
Club	Season	League			National cup		League cup		Europe		Total	
Club	Season	Division	Apps	Goals	Apps	Goals	Apps	Goals	Apps	Goals	Apps	Goals
Beveren	1960–61	Fourth Division	4	2								
Beveren	1961–62	Fourth Division	28	12								
Beveren	1962–63	Fourth Division	30	23								
Beveren	1963–64	Third Division	30	9								
Beveren	1964–65	Third Division	29	9								
Beveren	Total		121	56								
Antwerp	1965–66	First Division	26	8								
Antwerp	1966–67	First Division	26	3								
Antwerp	1967–68	First Division	25	2								
Antwerp	Total		77	14								
Standard Liège	1968–69	First Division	25	1								
Standard Liège	1969–70	First Division	26	6								
Standard Liège	1970–71	First Division	28	6								
Standard Liège	1971–72	First Division	21	1								
Standard Liège	1972–73	First Division	18	2								
Standard Liège	1973–74	First Division	13	2								
Standard Liège	1974–75	First Division	20	4								
Standard Liège	1975–76	First Division	19	3								
Standard Liège	Total		170	24								
Beringen	1976–77	First Division	30	5								
Beringen	1977–78	First Division	28	5								
Beringen	1978–79	First Division	23	5								
Beringen	1979–80	First Division	29	2								
Beringen	Total		110	17								
Beveren	1980–81	First Division	21	2								
Beveren	1981–82	First Division	28	4								
Beveren	Total		49	6								
Sint-Truiden	1982–83	Second Division	18	0								
Sint-Truiden	1983–84	Second Division	8	0								
Sint-Truiden	Total		26	0								
Career total			553	117								

Appearances and goals by national team and year
National team	Year	Apps	Goals
Belgium	1966	2	0
Belgium	1967	2	0
Belgium	1968	6	0
Belgium	1969	4	0
Belgium	1970	6	3
Belgium	1971	5	1
Belgium	1972	3	1
Belgium	1973	1	0
Belgium	1974	6	2
Belgium	1975	1	0
Belgium	1979	3	1
Belgium	1980	9	0
Belgium	1981	3	0
Belgium	1982	6	1
Total		57	9

List of international goals scored by Wilfried Van Moer
No.	Cap	Date	Venue	Opponent	Score	Result	Competition
1	16	3 June 1970	Estadio Azteca, Mexico City, Mexico	El Salvador	1–0	3–0	1970 FIFA World Cup Group stage
2	16	3 June 1970	Estadio Azteca, Mexico City, Mexico	El Salvador	2–0	3–0	1970 FIFA World Cup Group stage
3	19	15 November 1970	Heysel Stadium, Brussels, Belgium	France	1–1	1–2	Friendly
4	23	20 May 1971	Stade Municipal, Luxembourg City, Luxembourg	Luxembourg	4–0	4–0	Friendly
5	27	13 May 1972	Stade Émile Versé, Anderlecht, Belgium	Italy	1–0	2–1	1982 World Cup qualification
6	31	17 April 1974	Stade de Sclessin, Liège, Belgium	Poland	1–0	1–1	Friendly
7	34	8 September 1974	Laugardalsvöllur, Reykjavík, Iceland	Iceland	1–0	2–0	Euro 1984 qualification
8	38	17 October 1979	Heysel Stadium, Brussels, Belgium	Portugal	1–0	2–0	Euro 1984 qualification
9	53	24 April 1982	Heysel Stadium, Brussels, Belgium	Bulgaria	2–1	2–1	Friendly

== Honours ==
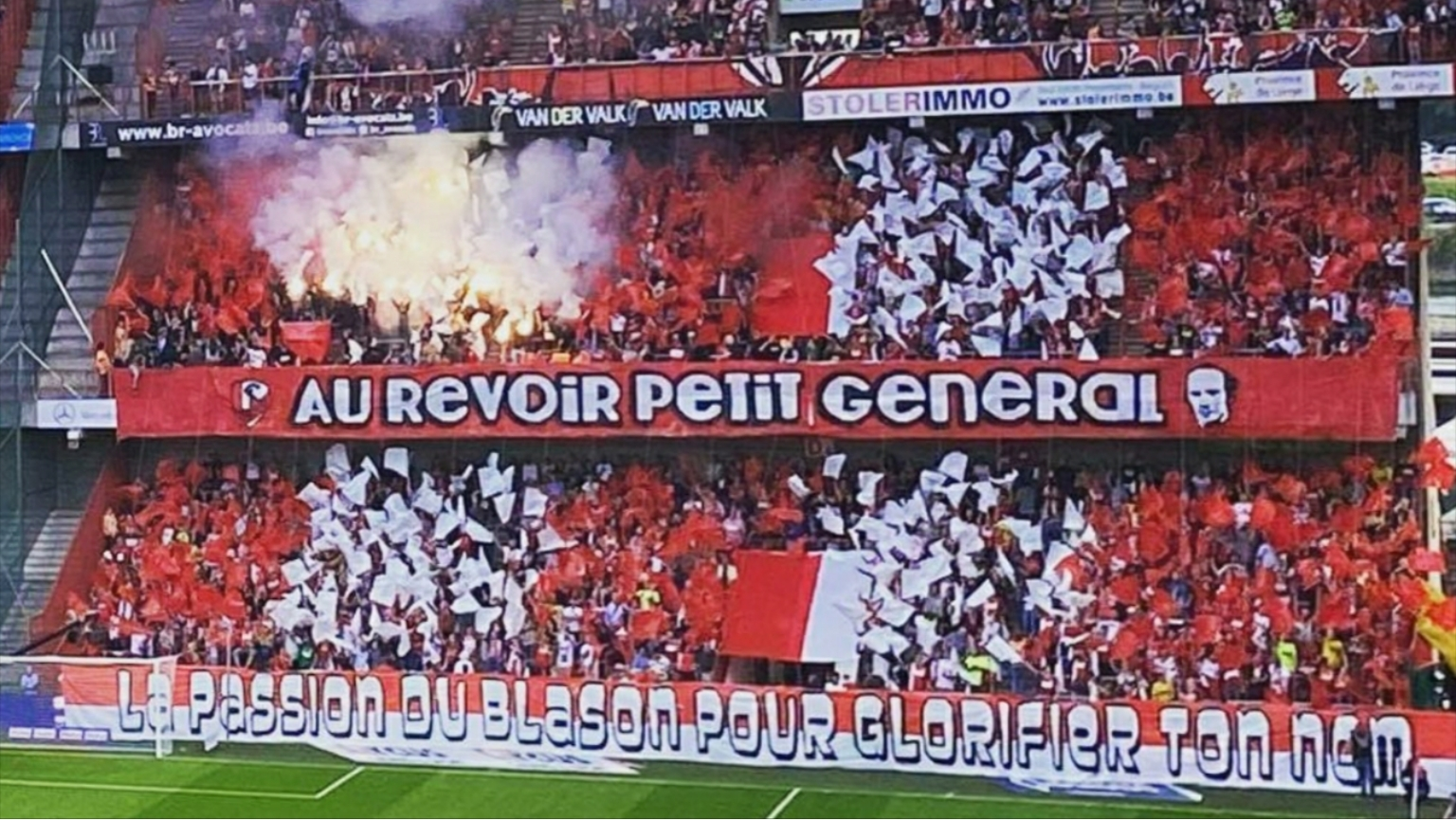
Farewell to Wilfried Van Moer in the stadium of Standard Liège, September 2021

Standard Liège

- Belgian First Division: 1968–69, 1969–70, 1970–71
- Belgian League Cup: 1975

Belgium

- UEFA European Championship: runners-up 1980
- Belgian Sports Merit Award: 1980

Individual

- Belgian Golden Shoe: 1966, 1969, 1970
- Sport Ideal European XI: 1972
- Ballon d'Or fourth place: 1980
- Ballon d'Or nominations: 1971, 1981
- Belgian Golden Shoe of the 20th Century (1995): third place
- Platina Eleven (Best Team in 50 Years of Golden Shoe Winners) (2003)
- The Best Golden Shoe Team Ever (2011)
- IFFHS All Time Belgium XI (2021)
- Standard Liège Hall of Fame: 2024
