= Antal Nagy (footballer, born 1944) =

Hungarian footballer

Personal information
- Date of birth: 16 May 1944 (age 82)
- Place of birth: Budapest, Hungary
- Height: 1.78 m (5 ft 10 in)
- Position: Striker

Senior career*
Years	Team	Apps	(Gls)
1963–1968	Budapest Honvéd	70	(25)
1968–1969	Standard Liège	31	(21)
1969–1972	Twente	39	(19)
1972–1973	Olympique Marseille	3	(0)
1973–1974	Hércules	36	(10)
1974–1975	Wuppertaler SV	10	(2)
1975–1976	Sant Andreu	5	(1)
1976	Caen	12	(2)
1977	Royal Antwerp	2	(0)
1977–1978	Leixões	21	(2)
Total		229	(82)

International career
1964–1966	Hungary	3	(0)
- * Club domestic league appearances and goals

Antal Nagy (born 16 May 1944 in Budapest) is a Hungarian former professional footballer who played as a striker. In his only season for Standard de Liège (1968–69), he won the Belgian championship and he became the Belgian First Division top scorer.

Nagy represented the Hungary national team at the 1966 FIFA World Cup.

== Honours ==
Budapest Honvéd

- Hungarian Cup: 1964; runner-up 1968

Standard Liège

- Belgian First Division: 1968–69

Individual

- Belgian First Division top scorer: 1968–69 (20 goals)
