= Jean Mathonet =

Belgian footballer

Personal information
- Date of birth: 6 October 1925
- Place of birth: Bévercé, Belgium
- Date of death: 22 October 2004 (aged 79)
- Place of death: Malmedy, Belgium
- Position: Striker

Senior career*
Years	Team	Apps	(Gls)
1945–1960	Standard de Liège	359	(138)
Total		359	(138)

International career
1952–1958	Belgium	13	(0)
- * Club domestic league appearances and goals

Jean Mathonet (6 October 1925, Bévercé, Malmedy – 22 October 2004, Malmedy) was a Belgian football player who finished top scorer of the Belgian First Division with 26 goals in 1956 while playing for Standard Liège. He played 13 times with the Belgium national team between 1952 and 1958. Mathonet made his international debut on Christmas 1952 in a 0–1 friendly win against France.

== Honours ==
=== Club ===
Standard Liège

- Belgian First Division: 1957–58
- Belgian Cup: 1953-54

=== Individual ===
- Belgian First Division top scorer: 1955–56 (26 goals)
