= André Riou =

French footballer (1918-2005)

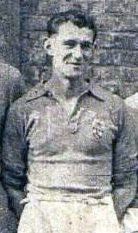
- André Riou in 1943

Personal information
- Date of birth: 8 August 1918
- Place of birth: France
- Date of death: 5 October 2005 (aged 87)
- Place of death: Toulouse, France
- Position: Striker

Senior career*
Years	Team	Apps	(Gls)
–	Racing de Paris		
–	Toulouse		

Managerial career
- Toulouse
- Béziers
- 1948–1949: Red Star
- 1950–1951: Amiens
- 1953–1958: Standard Liège
- 1958–1961: Daring Club Bruxelles
- 1962–1965: RAEC Mons
- 1965–1966: Union Saint-Gilloise
- * Club domestic league appearances and goals

André Riou (8 August 1918– 5 October 2005), nicknamed l'homme au béret (French for 'the man with a beret'), was a French footballer.

Riou was born in Toulouse, and played for Toulouse FC at the end of the 1930s as a striker, but was best known as a manager all over France.

He was also head of youth development for the FFF, at the beginning of the 1950s, and was also regional head of technical coaching until the 1980s.

== Playing career ==
- Racing de Paris
- Toulouse FC

== Playing honours ==
- Champion of Zone Sud in 1943 (TFC)

== Coaching career ==
- Toulouse FC
- AS Biterroise (D2)
- Red Star Olympique Audonien/Stade Français: 1948 to 1950
- Amiens SC
- Standard de Liège: 1953 (1st pro. coach at the club) in 1958
- Daring Club Bruxelles: 1958 to 1961
- RAEC Mons: 1962 to 1965
- Union Saint-Gilloise: 1965 to 1966

== Honours as coach ==
- Champions of Belgium : 1958 (with Standard, 1st national professional title for the club)
- Coupe de Belgique : 1954 (with Standard, 1st cup for the club, as pros.)
