= Dominique D'Onofrio =

Belgian footballer, coach, and chairman (1953-2016)

Dominique Nicolas D'Onofrio
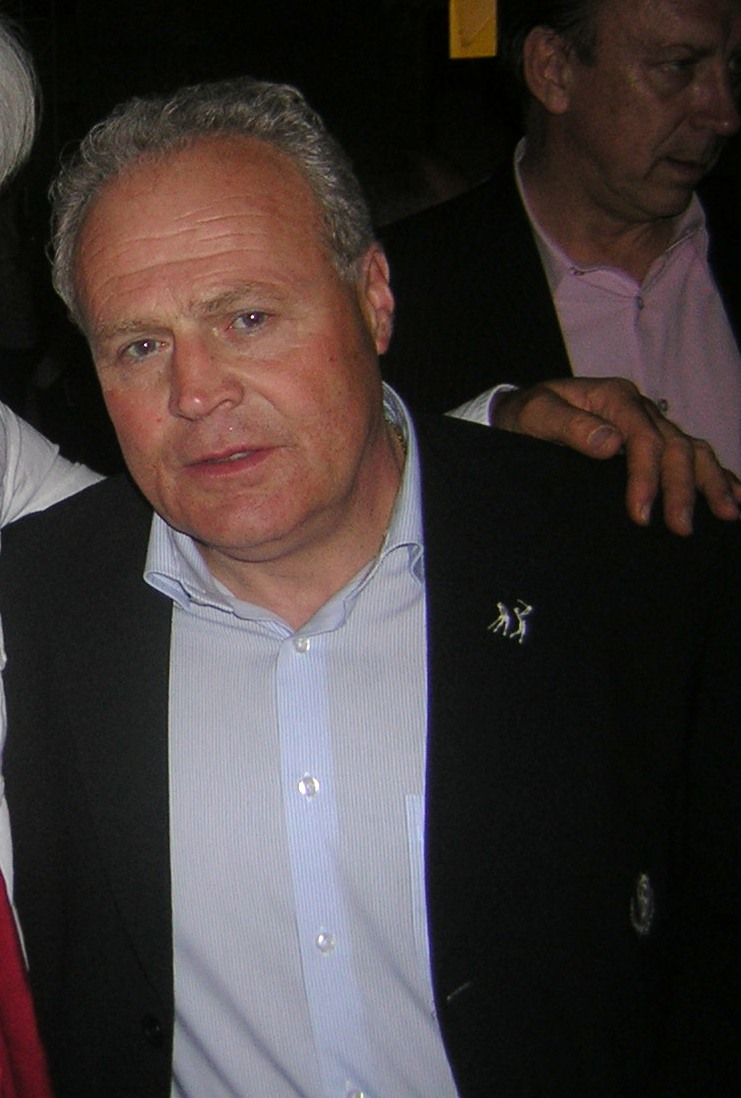
- D'Onofrio in 2008

Personal information
- Date of birth: 18 April 1953
- Place of birth: Castelforte, Italy
- Date of death: 12 February 2016 (aged 62)
- Place of death: Buenos Aires, Argentina

Senior career*
Years	Team	Apps	(Gls)
1974–1975	R.R.F.C. Montegnée		
1975–1976	Ans FC		
1976–1977	RJS Bas-Oha		
1977–1982	Ans FC		

Managerial career
- 1994–1995: Tilleur Saint-Nicolas
- 1995–1996: RFC Union La Calamine
- 1996–1997: R.R.F.C. Montegnée
- 2000–2001: Standard de Liège
- 2002–2006: Standard de Liège
- 2010–2011: Standard de Liège
- * Club domestic league appearances and goals

Dominique Nicolas D'Onofrio (18 April 1953 – 12 February 2016) was an Italian football coach, later chairman. He was born in Castelforte, Italy.

== Career ==
D'Onofrio was a coachbuilder until his brother bought out Standard Liège and enabled him to integrate a professional club. At Standard de Liège since 1998, at first with the U6 (youth, scouting and contracts), he quickly took over from Tomislav Ivić (with Christian Labarbe) for 2000–01. He took charge of the first team for three matches in December 2000. In January 2001, he took over from Michel Preud'homme until July 2002.

In 2002–03, he took over from Robert Waseige for the first five matches of the Championship. He had little success as first team coach, and was fired on 14 September 2002, after a domestic defeat against Club Bruges and a catastrophic first season.

Adored by some supporters who appreciated the results gained under his leadership, reviled by others who disliked his gameplay and recourse to a long-ball system, he left his post in May 2005, before being named a few weeks later after the club failed to find a replacement. This provoked great remorse from those supporters who had campaigned for his firing, who apologised a few days before his return was announced.

In May 2006, he left the post of coach for good, and became sporting director with technical director Michel Preud'homme. Although the club had qualified for the first time for the third preliminary round of the Champions League, he was hounded by supporters after the last game of the season, where they failed to win their first championship since 1983. He stated that he held himself responsible for this.

Becoming the sporting director of Standard de Liège and technical director in July 2006, he was in charge of scouting and recruitment. Two months later, when Michel Preud'homme took over from Johan Boskamp, and appointed his own staff, looking for immediate results, Dominique D'Onofrio became technical director and looked to improve the club's results.

On 10 February 2010, due to bad results at the club, he ended the contract of László Bölöni, and Dominique D'Onofrio took over as head coach of Standard until June 2010.

He died in Buenos Aires, Argentina, from a cardiac arrest on 12 February 2016. He was 62 years old

Under his leadership, Standard de Liège obtained the following results in the Championship:

Year	Position	Matches	Won	Drawn	Lost	GF	GA	Points
2000–2001	Interim	3	1	1	1	7	5	4/9
2002–2003	7th	29	15	7	7	53	29	52/87
2003–2004	3rd	34	18	11	5	68	31	65/102
2004–2005	4th	36	22	7	7	67	34	73/108
2005–2006	2nd	34	19	8	7	51	28	65/102
2009–2010	8th	10	3	3	4	11	10	12/30
2010–2011	6th	30	15	4	11	50	38	49/90
Total	–	176	93	41	42	307	172	320/528

== Honours ==
RRFC Montegnée

- Playoff winners – Promotion (Division 4)
- Champions – Promotion (Division 4)

Seraing RUL

- Winner of final round – Promotion (Division 4)

Standard de Liège

- Belgian Cup: 2010–11
