= Robert Waseige =

Belgian footballer and manager (1939–2019)

- Waseige managing Belgium during Euro 2000

Personal information
- Date of birth: 26 August 1939
- Place of birth: Rocourt, Belgium
- Date of death: 17 July 2019 (aged 79)
- Place of death: Liège
- Position: Defender

Senior career*
Years	Team	Apps	(Gls)
1959–1963	FC Liège		
1963–1970	RW Brussels		
1970–1973	Winterslag		

Managerial career
- 1971–1976: Winterslag
- 1976–1979: Standard Liège
- 1979–1981: Winterslag
- 1981–1983: Lokeren
- 1983–1992: FC Liège
- 1992–1994: Charleroi
- 1994–1996: Standard Liège
- 1996: Sporting CP
- 1997–1999: Charleroi
- 1999–2002: Belgium
- 2002: Standard Liège
- 2004: Algeria
- 2005: FC Brussels
- * Club domestic league appearances and goals

Robert Waseige (26 August 1939 – 17 July 2019) was a Belgian football manager and player.

== Career ==
While managing R.F.C. de Liège he helped them win the 1989–90 Belgian Cup. He became the coach of Belgium before Euro 2000 and led Belgium to the second round at the 2002 World Cup.

He then left the national team, having signed a contract with Standard Liège prior to the 2002 World Cup tournament. After a deceiving start in the Belgian First Division he was fired by the club and replaced by caretaker manager Dominique D'Onofrio. He later managed Algeria. Waseige also managed several other clubs: Winterslag, FC Liège, Lokeren, Charleroi, FC Brussels and Sporting CP in Portugal. As a player, he wore the shirts of FC Liège, RW Brussels and Winterslag. He was for some time a consultant for BeTV, a Belgian private TV channel. He died in a hospital in Liège on 17 July 2019. He was suffering from heart and kidney problems.

== Honours ==
=== Player ===
RW Brussels

- Belgian Second Division: 1964–65

=== Player-manager ===
KFC Winterslag

- Belgian Third Division: 1971–72

=== Manager ===
KFC Winterslag

- Belgian Second Division: 1975–76

RFC Liège

- Belgian Cup: 1989–90; runner-up 1986–87
- Belgian League Cup: 1986

Belgium

- FIFA Fair Play Trophy: 2002 World Cup

=== Individual ===
- Belgian Professional Manager of the Year: 1984–85 (RFC Liège), 1993–94 (Charleroi), 1994–95 (Standard Liège)
- Honorary Citizen of Liège, Belgium: 2012
