= René Dohet =

Belgian footballer and coach

Personal information
- Date of birth: 8 November 1907
- Place of birth: Belgium
- Date of death: unknown
- Position: Midfielder

Senior career*
Years	Team	Apps	(Gls)
1919–1927	Standard de Liège	139	(14)

Managerial career
- 1940–1942: Standard de Liège
- * Club domestic league appearances and goals

René Dohet (born 8 November 1907, date of death unknown) was a former Belgian footballer and coach.

== Honours as player ==
- Runners-up in Belgian First Division in the 1926/1927 season and the 1927/1928 season.
