= Stade Lambert Fourir =

Football stadium in Limbourg, Belgium

- Interactive map of Stade Lambert Fourir
- Location: Bêverie, Dolhain
- Coordinates: 50°36′32″N 5°56′47″E
- Owner: Royal Dolhain Football Club
- Capacity: 3,000
- Surface: Grass

The Stade Lambert Fourir is a football stadium of the Royal Dolhain FC in Limbourg, Belgium. The club has three football fields. The facilities were restored some years ago. The main building or main grandstand consists of several facilities. There are four locker rooms for players and a locker room for the referee, also including sanitary facilities such as toilets and a small cafeteria is available. The bar association has been recently restored. It has room for several hundred visitors. It is also possible to rent the bar for birthday parties or similar events or other celebrations. More information can be requested from the Board of the Association. In 1947 the football club from coming Dolhain named the stadium "Stade Lambert Fourir" to be that referred to this day. The stadium holds 3,000 spectators.

== See also ==
- Royal Dolhain Football Club
