= 1957–58 Belgian First Division =

55th season of top-tier football in Belgium

Belgian First Division
- Season: 1957–58

Statistics of Belgian First Division in the 1957–58 season.

== Overview ==
Location of teams in Belgian First Division 1957–58

It was contested by 16 teams, and Standard Liège won the championship.

== League standings ==
Pos	Team	Pld	W	D	L	GF	GA	GD	Pts	Qualification or relegation
1	Standard Liège	30	18	8	4	55	21	+34	44	Qualified for 1958–59 European Cup
2	Royal Antwerp FC	30	19	6	5	77	35	+42	44	
3	La Gantoise	30	17	7	6	66	37	+29	41	
4	Beerschot	30	15	9	6	70	46	+24	39	
5	R.S.C. Anderlecht	30	12	13	5	50	33	+17	37	
6	Royale Union Saint-Gilloise	30	14	8	8	61	44	+17	36	Qualified for 1958–60 Inter-Cities Fairs Cup
7	R.C.S. Verviétois	30	10	12	8	33	29	+4	32	
8	Lierse S.K.	30	10	9	11	41	43	−2	29	
9	R.F.C. de Liège	30	8	11	11	48	48	0	27	
10	K. Waterschei S.V. Thor Genk	30	9	8	13	48	52	−4	26	
11	R.O.C. de Charleroi-Marchienne	30	9	8	13	39	54	−15	26	
12	K. Sint-Truidense V.V.	30	7	10	13	41	64	−23	24	
13	K Berchem Sport	30	8	8	14	38	52	−14	24	
14	Tilleur FC	30	5	8	17	39	72	−33	18	
15	Daring Club	30	6	5	19	40	74	−34	17	Relegated to Belgian Second Division
16	K.R.C. Mechelen	30	4	8	18	30	72	−42	16	Relegated to Belgian Second Division

== Results ==
Home \ Away	AND	ANT	BEE	BRC	DAR	GNT	FCL	LIE	MEC	OLY	STA	STV	USG	TIL	VER	WTG
Anderlecht		1–1	3–3	5–1	2–2	2–2	0–0	2–1	3–1	4–4	2–0	1–0	2–1	2–0	1–0	4–1
Antwerp	2–0		2–3	4–1	3–2	3–5	1–0	4–0	4–0	1–1	1–0	1–0	2–3	2–1	3–0	7–0
Beerschot	1–1	1–4		6–0	5–3	0–2	5–0	3–0	4–2	3–1	0–0	8–1	1–2	3–1	1–1	2–1
Berchem	1–1	1–3	1–2		0–0	1–5	1–3	0–1	6–0	3–0	0–0	0–0	1–1	4–1	0–2	1–1
Daring Club	1–5	2–5	0–0	1–5		2–4	2–1	0–1	1–0	1–2	1–4	2–1	1–2	3–1	1–2	2–3
La Gantoise	2–2	2–0	1–3	3–0	1–2		2–2	2–3	0–0	1–0	0–0	5–2	1–1	6–2	2–0	3–1
Liège	0–0	2–1	2–2	2–0	1–1	0–1		2–2	9–0	5–0	0–2	1–1	1–3	2–1	1–1	0–3
Lierse	0–0	1–1	3–0	0–1	1–1	2–2	0–2		1–0	4–2	1–2	6–3	1–2	0–0	0–0	4–1
Mechelen	1–2	0–5	2–2	1–1	1–3	3–0	2–1	0–2		0–1	1–1	4–1	2–3	0–2	2–1	1–4
Olympic Charleroi	1–0	1–3	3–4	1–1	2–1	0–1	2–2	0–0	3–1		0–0	1–3	3–1	4–1	0–0	1–1
Standard Liège	2–0	2–2	4–0	4–0	3–1	0–1	1–0	2–0	5–2	2–0		2–3	4–1	4–1	2–0	3–1
Sint-Truiden	0–0	3–3	0–2	1–3	5–1	0–6	2–0	1–3	1–1	2–1	0–1		0–0	2–2	0–0	4–3
Union SG	1–0	2–4	2–1	0–4	4–0	0–2	4–4	4–1	4–1	6–1	1–2	2–2		5–0	0–0	1–3
Tilleur	1–3	1–3	3–3	0–3	3–2	3–1	2–2	4–3	1–1	2–3	0–0	1–2	1–1		2–0	1–1
Verviers	1–1	0–2	1–2	2–1	2–1	3–1	4–0	0–0	0–0	1–0	1–1	4–1	1–1	2–0		4–3
Waterschei Thor	2–1	0–0	0–0	2–0	5–0	0–2	2–3	2–0	1–1	0–1	1–2	0–0	1–3	5–1	0–0	

Legend: Blue = home team win; Yellow = draw; Red = away team win.
