= István Sztáni =

Hungarian footballer and manager

Personal information
- Full name: István Sztáni
- Date of birth: 19 March 1937 (age 89)
- Place of birth: Ózd, Hungary
- Position: Forward

Youth career
- 1942–1954: Vasas Ózd

Senior career*
| Years | Team | Apps | (Gls) |
| 1954–1956 | Vasas Ózd | | |
| 1956–1957 | Banned by FIFA | | |
| 1957–1959 | Eintracht Frankfurt | 36 | (20) |
| 1960–1965 | Standard Liège | 155 | (57) |
| 1965–1968 | Eintracht Frankfurt | 21 | (3) |
| 1968–1969 | Makkabi Frankfurt | ? | (0) |
| 1969–1971 | Gent | 11 | (8) |

Managerial career
- 1971–1973: Gent
- 1973–1974: Tournaisien
- 1974–1975: 1. FC Schweinfurt 05
- 1975–1976: VfB Stuttgart
- 1976–1977: FK Pirmasens
- 1977–1978: Bayern Hof
- 1979: Arminia Hannover
- 1980: Würzburger FV
- * Club domestic league appearances and goals

István Sztáni (Hungarian pronunciation: [ˈiʃtvaːn ˈstɒni]; born 19 March 1937) is a Hungarian football manager and a former player who played as a forward.

Sztani left Hungary for Eintracht Frankfurt and faced a one-year FIFA ban. With Eintracht he won the German championship in 1959. At the end of the season he moved to Standard Liège of Belgium and stayed there until 1965 when he returned to Frankfurt. In his second stint he amounted 21 Bundesliga appearances for Eintracht.

In the 1975–76 season, Sztáni was manager at VfB Stuttgart in the 2. Bundesliga Süd, but was fired on 31 March 1976 when the planned promotion to the Bundesliga was almost out of reach.

After this tenure Sztáni managed a number of other German second-tier clubs.
