= Maurice Gillis =

Belgian footballer

Personal information
- Date of birth: 6 November 1897
- Place of birth: Liège, Belgium
- Date of death: 22 March 1980 (aged 82)
- Place of death: Liège, Belgium
- Position: Striker

Senior career*
Years	Team	Apps	(Gls)
1919–1935	Standard Liège	269	(125)

International career
1922–1928	Belgium	23	(8)
- * Club domestic league appearances and goals

Maurice Gillis (6 November 1897 – 22 March 1980) was a Belgian international footballer who played as a striker.

== Career ==
Gillis played for Standard Liège, and scored 8 goals in 23 appearances for the Belgian national side, including at the 1924 Summer Olympics.
