= Roger Petit =

Belgian fencer

Personal information
- Born: 17 August 1922 Baisy-Thy, Genappe, Belgium
- Died: 2011 (aged 88–89)

Sport
- Sport: Fencing

Roger Petit (17 August 1922 – 2011) was a Belgian fencer. He competed in the team sabre event at the 1960 Summer Olympics.
