= Helmut Graf =

Austrian footballer and manager

Personal information
- Date of birth: 8 February 1963 (age 63)
- Place of birth: Mistelbach, Austria
- Height: 1.75 m (5 ft 9 in)
- Position: Defender

Senior career*
Years	Team	Apps	(Gls)
–1983	SV Neuberg		
1983–1999	FC Admira Wacker Mödling	358	(2)
1983–1999	FC Admira Wacker Mödling II	14	(0)

Managerial career
- 2011–2015: FC Admira Wacker Mödling U18
- * Club domestic league appearances and goals

Helmut Graf (born 8 February 1963) is an Austrian football manager and former player who played as a defender.
