= Fernand Massay =

Belgian footballer

Personal information
- Date of birth: 20 December 1919
- Date of death: 13 December 2010 (aged 90)

International career
Years	Team	Apps	(Gls)
1945–1947	Belgium	5	(0)

Fernand Massay (20 December 1919 – 13 December 2010) was a Belgian footballer. He played in five matches for the Belgium national football team from 1945 to 1947.
