= KCVV Elewijt =

Belgian football club

- Full name: Koninklijke Crossing Voetbalvereniging Elewijt
- Nickname: Voyagers
- Founded: 29 May 1912
- Stadium: Driesstraat; Elewijt, Belgium
- Capacity: 2,500
- Manager: Rudi Bautmans
- Coach: Wim D'Hondt
- League: P3 Brabant
- 2025–26: 12º
- Website: kcvvelewijt.be
Home colours	Away colours

Koninklijke Crossing Voetbal Vereniging Elewijt is a Belgian football club from the village of Elewijt in the municipality of Zemst, Flemish Brabant. It plays at the eighth level in the Belgian football league system, i.e. in the 3rd division of the regional league of Brabant as of 2014–15.

== History ==
The club was founded in Ganshoren (North-West of Brussels) as Crossing F.C. Ganshoren in 1913 and was given the matricule n°55 by the Royal Belgian Football Association. R. Crossing F.C. Ganshoren changed its name in 1959 to become R. Crossing Club Molenbeek as it moved to Molenbeek-Saint-Jean, Brussels.

Two years later the club qualified for the second division and finished 5th. It then reached the third place in 1967 and the second two seasons after to qualify for the first division. Before the beginning of the first season of the matricule number 55 at the highest level, in 1969 Crossing merged with R.C.S. Schaarbeek to become the famous R. Crossing Club Schaarbeek located in Schaerbeek. The spell in the first division only lasted for 4 seasons and then the club decayed.

In 1991 it merged with V.V. Elewijt to become the K.V.V. Crossing Elewijt.

== See also ==
- Category:KCVV Elewijt players
