= Fernand Blaise =

Belgian footballer

Personal information
- Date of birth: 7 February 1925
- Date of death: 10 February 1991 (aged 66)
- Position: Defender

International career
Years	Team	Apps	(Gls)
1953	Belgium	1	(0)

Fernand Blaise (7 February 1925 – 10 February 1991) was a Belgian footballer. He played in one match for the Belgium national football team in 1953. He was also named in Belgium's squad for the Group 2 qualification tournament for the 1954 FIFA World Cup.
