= 1970–71 Belgian First Division =

68th season of top-tier football in Belgium

Belgian First Division
- Season: 1970–71

Statistics of Belgian First Division in the 1970–71 season.

== Overview ==
Location of teams in Belgian First Division 1970–71

It was contested by 16 teams, and Standard Liège won the championship.

== League standings ==
Pos	Team	Pld	W	D	L	GF	GA	GD	Pts	Qualification or relegation
1	Standard Liège	30	21	5	4	66	24	+42	47	Qualified for 1971–72 European Cup
2	Club Brugge K.V.	30	21	4	5	71	32	+39	46	Qualified for 1971–72 UEFA Cup
3	R.S.C. Anderlecht	30	18	5	7	53	28	+25	41	Qualified for 1971–72 UEFA Cup
4	Lierse S.K.	30	17	1	12	45	31	+14	35	Qualified for 1971–72 UEFA Cup
5	Racing White	30	12	9	9	35	29	+6	33	
6	Beerschot	30	12	9	9	36	32	+4	33	Qualified for 1971–72 European Cup Winners' Cup
7	K.S.K. Beveren	30	11	8	11	33	33	0	30	
8	K. Sint-Truidense V.V.	30	12	7	11	36	39	−3	29 (Note: 2 points deducted?)	
9	K.S.V. Waregem	30	8	11	11	33	35	−2	27	
10	Royale Union Saint-Gilloise	30	9	7	14	40	49	−9	25	
11	R.F.C. de Liège	30	6	13	11	17	33	−16	25	
12	Crossing Club Schaerbeek	30	9	6	15	29	42	−13	24	
13	Royal Antwerp FC	30	9	6	15	30	50	−20	24	
14	KFC Diest	30	7	10	13	29	37	−8	24	
15	R. Charleroi S.C.	30	8	7	15	37	54	−17	23	Relegated to Division II
16	La Gantoise	30	4	6	20	23	65	−42	14	Relegated to Division II

== Results ==
Home \ Away	AND	ANT	BEE	BEV	CLU	CHA	CRO	DIE	GNT	FCL	LIE	RRW	STA	STV	USG	WAR
Anderlecht		2–1	4–0	1–0	1–3	3–0	2–1	1–0	4–0	5–1	3–1	0–0	0–1	2–2	0–1	3–1
Antwerp	1–3		1–2	0–2	0–2	1–2	1–0	1–0	2–2	1–0	2–1	2–0	5–0	3–2	1–1	1–0
Beerschot	0–0	1–0		0–0	2–0	2–0	0–0	1–1	2–1	0–1	0–3	3–0	0–2	3–1	1–0	5–0
Beveren	2–1	3–2	0–0		0–2	1–0	1–1	0–0	4–0	0–0	2–0	1–3	1–1	4–3	0–0	0–2
Club Brugge	4–0	2–0	3–1	3–1		4–0	4–1	1–1	2–0	3–0	2–3	4–0	2–3	4–1	2–0	4–2
Charleroi	0–3	6–0	3–3	3–2	0–2		2–3	0–0	5–0	1–1	1–3	1–4	1–1	2–0	2–1	1–0
Crossing Schaerbeek	2–0	3–1	3–1	0–3	1–4	2–0		3–1	2–1	0–0	0–1	0–1	0–1	0–2	3–0	0–0
Diest	0–1	0–0	1–1	0–1	1–4	3–2	1–1		0–2	3–0	2–1	1–1	0–1	1–0	3–1	2–0
La Gantoise	0–3	4–0	0–3	0–2	1–2	1–1	1–0	0–4		1–1	1–0	0–0	0–1	2–2	4–8	0–3
Liège	2–2	1–1	0–0	3–0	1–1	0–0	0–1	1–0	0–0		2–0	0–1	0–3	1–0	0–0	1–0
Lierse	0–1	1–2	0–1	2–0	4–1	2–3	1–0	2–0	2–0	2–0		2–0	2–1	4–2	1–0	2–0
Racing White	1–2	1–1	0–1	1–0	1–1	6–0	2–0	1–0	3–1	1–0	0–2		1–1	1–0	1–1	1–1
Standard Liège	1–3	6–0	3–1	1–1	4–0	2–0	4–1	4–0	3–0	3–1	3–0	1–0		2–1	6–0	2–1
Sint-Truiden	1–1	1–0	1–0	1–0	1–2	1–0	2–0	1–1	1–0	0–0	0–0	2–1	2–0		2–1	2–1
Union SG	1–2	0–0	3–1	3–0	1–2	3–1	4–0	4–2	3–1	0–0	0–3	0–2	0–4	2–1		2–2
Waregem	1–0	2–0	1–1	0–2	1–1	0–0	1–1	1–1	2–0	4–0	2–0	1–1	1–1	1–1	2–0	

Legend: Blue = home team win; Yellow = draw; Red = away team win.
