= 1969–70 Belgian First Division =

67th season of top-tier football in Belgium

Belgian First Division
- Season: 1969–70

Statistics of Belgian First Division in the 1969–70 season.

== Overview ==
Location of teams in Belgian First Division 1969–70

It was contested by 16 teams, and Standard Liège won the championship.

== League standings ==
Pos	Team	Pld	W	D	L	GF	GA	GD	Pts	Qualification or relegation
1	Standard Liège	30	22	5	3	64	24	+40	49	Qualified for 1970–71 European Cup
2	Club Brugge K.V.	30	20	5	5	75	36	+39	45	Qualified for 1970–71 European Cup Winners' Cup
3	La Gantoise	30	16	7	7	49	35	+14	39	Qualified for 1970–71 Inter-Cities Fairs Cup
4	R.S.C. Anderlecht	30	15	6	9	64	29	+35	36	Qualified for 1970–71 Inter-Cities Fairs Cup
5	K.S.K. Beveren	30	14	8	8	45	29	+16	36	Qualified for 1970–71 Inter-Cities Fairs Cup
6	Beerschot	30	14	7	9	42	26	+16	35	
7	Lierse S.K.	30	12	8	10	39	42	−3	32	
8	Racing White	30	10	10	10	36	41	−5	30	
9	R. Charleroi S.C.	30	13	3	14	42	43	−1	29	
10	K.S.V. Waregem	30	8	9	13	35	51	−16	25	
11	R.F.C. de Liège	30	8	7	15	34	44	−10	23	
12	K. Sint-Truidense V.V.	30	8	7	15	36	57	−21	23	
13	Crossing Club Schaerbeek	30	8	7	15	29	50	−21	23	
14	Royale Union Saint-Gilloise	30	6	10	14	26	45	−19	22	
15	Beringen FC	30	4	10	16	27	49	−22	18	Relegated to Division II
16	A.S.V. Oostende K.M.	30	4	7	19	24	66	−42	15	Relegated to Division II

== Results ==
Home \ Away	AND	BEE	BER	BEV	CLU	CHA	CRO	GNT	FCL	LIE	OOS	RRW	STA	STV	USG	WAR
Anderlecht		0–1	3–0	5–0	1–3	2–0	4–0	3–1	2–0	6–0	3–0	0–0	0–2	4–0	2–2	7–1
Beerschot	1–3		3–0	1–0	3–0	2–0	3–1	1–0	4–0	1–1	0–0	5–0	3–0	2–0	1–0	1–1
Beringen	2–2	1–1		1–2	1–1	1–2	0–0	1–3	2–2	0–0	2–0	1–1	1–2	1–0	0–0	2–0
Beveren	0–0	1–0	2–1		2–3	3–1	0–0	1–2	2–0	3–0	5–1	5–2	0–0	7–1	1–0	2–0
Club Brugge	1–0	2–0	2–0	3–2		3–1	2–1	8–0	5–2	4–1	3–0	3–0	1–1	5–0	4–1	4–0
Charleroi	1–3	1–0	0–1	1–0	3–1		6–0	1–2	1–0	2–0	1–0	0–0	2–4	4–3	2–0	3–1
Crossing Schaerbeek	1–1	2–0	2–1	0–2	1–2	2–1		0–1	1–0	4–1	2–0	0–1	3–1	1–2	0–0	2–2
La Gantoise	3–1	1–1	4–1	0–0	2–1	4–1	2–0		3–1	1–2	2–2	1–0	0–0	4–1	1–0	3–0
Liège	1–4	2–1	3–0	0–1	0–1	0–1	4–0	0–0		3–2	1–1	1–1	1–1	0–2	4–0	1–0
Lierse	1–0	2–1	1–0	2–1	4–0	1–1	2–2	3–1	1–2		2–0	0–0	0–2	1–1	2–2	1–0
Oostende	1–3	1–2	2–0	0–0	0–4	1–3	2–0	0–0	2–2	0–3		4–2	0–3	2–1	0–2	1–5
Racing White	2–0	1–0	3–2	0–0	1–1	1–1	5–1	1–2	0–0	3–1	4–0		0–1	0–1	2–0	2–0
Standard Liège	1–0	2–2	5–3	3–0	2–0	2–1	0–3	2–1	2–1	1–0	5–0	9–0		2–0	2–0	2–0
Sint-Truiden	2–1	3–0	1–1	1–1	2–2	3–1	4–0	1–1	1–2	0–1	1–0	0–3	1–3		1–1	1–1
Union SG	1–3	0–1	1–0	0–1	2–2	2–0	0–0	0–4	2–1	0–0	3–3	1–0	1–2	3–1		2–2
Waregem	1–1	1–1	1–1	1–1	3–4	1–0	1–0	2–0	1–0	1–4	2–1	1–1	0–2	3–1	3–0	

Legend: Blue = home team win; Yellow = draw; Red = away team win.

== Attendances ==
No.	Club	Average
1	Standard	20,600
2	Anderlecht	19,467
3	Club Brugge	15,067
4	Beerschot	14,300
5	La Gantoise	12,767
6	Charleroi	11,067
7	Liège	10,700
8	Beveren	10,500
9	STVV	10,300
10	Waregem	8,933
11	Beringen	8,733
12	Lierse	8,067
13	RUSG	7,733
14	Oostende	7,567
15	Schaerbeek	7,400
16	Racing White	5,800
