= 1968–69 Belgian First Division =

66th season of top-tier football in Belgium

Belgian First Division
- Season: 1968–69

Statistics of Belgian First Division in the 1968–69 season.

== Overview ==
Location of teams in Belgian First Division 1968–69

It was contested by 16 teams, and Standard Liège won the championship.

== League standings ==
Pos	Team	Pld	W	D	L	GF	GA	GD	Pts	Qualification or relegation
1	Standard Liège	30	19	7	4	62	18	+44	45	Qualified for 1969–70 European Cup
2	R. Charleroi S.C.	30	17	6	7	42	26	+16	40	Qualified for 1969–70 Inter-Cities Fairs Cup
3	Lierse S.K.	30	13	10	7	49	36	+13	36	Qualified for 1969–70 European Cup Winners' Cup
4	R.S.C. Anderlecht	30	12	12	6	59	33	+26	36	Qualified for 1969–70 Inter-Cities Fairs Cup
5	Club Brugge K.V.	30	13	9	8	55	33	+22	35	Qualified for 1969–70 Inter-Cities Fairs Cup
6	K.S.K. Beveren	30	12	9	9	45	44	+1	33	
7	K. Sint-Truidense V.V.	30	11	11	8	44	41	+3	33	
8	K.S.V. Waregem	30	12	5	13	50	50	0	29	
9	Beringen FC	30	10	9	11	32	41	−9	29	
10	R.F.C. de Liège	30	12	4	14	35	44	−9	28	
11	La Gantoise	30	8	12	10	33	39	−6	28	
12	Royale Union Saint-Gilloise	30	8	9	13	30	42	−12	25	
13	Racing White	30	8	9	13	29	43	−14	25	
14	Beerschot	30	8	7	15	39	51	−12	23	
15	KV Mechelen	30	6	8	16	32	57	−25	20	Relegated to Division II
16	Daring Club Bruxelles	30	5	5	20	27	65	−38	15	Relegated to Division II

== Results ==
Home \ Away	AND	BEE	BER	BEV	CLU	CHA	DAR	GNT	FCL	LIE	MEC	RRW	STV	STA	USG	WAR
Anderlecht		5–1	2–0	1–2	1–1	3–1	2–1	1–3	7–0	0–0	5–1	2–0	2–2	0–0	0–1	2–2
Beerschot	2–1		1–1	3–3	3–1	0–1	0–1	1–0	1–0	1–2	8–2	2–1	1–1	1–3	5–2	2–1
Beringen	1–1	1–0		1–1	1–1	0–3	2–0	1–1	2–0	1–2	1–0	2–0	1–1	0–0	1–0	2–2
Beveren	3–3	1–0	1–0		2–1	3–1	2–1	1–1	3–1	1–1	2–0	3–3	3–0	1–0	1–1	1–0
Club Brugge	2–2	1–0	3–1	2–0		0–1	9–2	3–0	3–0	5–1	1–1	0–1	5–0	1–0	2–1	3–1
Charleroi	0–0	1–1	3–1	1–4	1–0		2–0	4–0	1–0	1–1	2–0	1–0	1–0	2–0	3–0	2–1
Daring Club	1–1	1–0	1–2	3–3	1–1	0–2		2–4	0–1	1–4	3–1	0–2	1–2	0–3	0–0	1–0
La Gantoise	2–3	2–0	1–1	1–1	2–2	1–1	2–0		1–0	0–0	1–2	0–0	1–1	0–0	0–1	2–1
Liège	0–1	2–0	2–0	3–1	3–1	3–1	4–0	0–0		2–2	2–1	2–0	0–0	4–3	1–0	1–2
Lierse	2–1	5–1	2–0	2–0	1–2	0–0	3–1	2–1	0–1		4–2	2–2	2–0	0–2	1–3	2–0
Mechelen	1–0	1–1	2–3	2–1	1–1	0–3	2–1	0–1	2–2	3–2		0–0	1–1	0–1	0–0	1–2
Racing White	0–5	2–1	3–1	1–0	0–1	0–0	1–2	2–2	2–0	0–2	2–1		0–1	1–1	1–1	2–0
Sint-Truiden	2–2	4–1	1–3	1–0	1–1	3–1	2–1	0–2	1–0	1–1	2–1	1–0		2–3	3–1	3–0
Standard Liège	1–1	3–0	3–1	6–0	1–0	1–0	4–1	3–0	5–0	0–0	4–0	0–0	3–1		5–1	3–1
Union SG	0–2	0–0	0–1	1–0	1–1	1–2	1–1	2–0	2–0	2–1	0–0	4–2	1–1	0–2		2–3
Waregem	1–2	2–2	4–0	3–1	3–1	3–0	3–0	3–2	2–1	2–2	1–4	2–1	2–2	0–2	3–1	

Legend: Blue = home team win; Yellow = draw; Red = away team win.
