= List of Belgium national football team managers =

The male Belgian national (association) football team has been under the supervision of 26 different permanent managers and two caretakers since 1910. Before 1910 and in 1919, a committee of the RBFA presided by Édouard de Laveleye selected the players. Initially supervised by foreigners, it would take until 1930 for team Belgium to be officially led by a Belgian (Hector Goetinck).

As of 1 December 2022, coach Roberto Martínez is the most successful (permanent) manager that Belgium has ever had in statistical terms, with an average of 2.26 points per match. He achieved third place at the 2018 World Cup and kept Belgium in the number one spot on the FIFA World Ranking for over three years. With this he outperformed the coach that previously brought Belgium successes at international tournament end stages, Guy Thys, who led his team to the 1980 European Championship final and six years later to the semi-finals of the World Cup in Mexico.

== Managers ==
Manager	Nat.	Tenure	Pld	W	D*	L	Win %	Pts/G (Note: According to the "three points for a win" standard)	Major tournaments**
Selection committee (1)	—	1904–1909	19	8	1	10	42.11	1.32	SO 1908
William Maxwell (1)	(Scotland)	1910–1913	23	11	3	9	47.83	1.57	SO 1912
Charles Bunyan	(England)	1914	4	0	0	4	0.00	0.00	—
Selection committee (2)	—	1914–1919	1	0	1	0	0.00	1.00	—
William Maxwell (2)	(Scotland)	1920–1928	56	18	10	28	32.14	1.14	SO 1920 – Winners (Note: Even though William Maxwell was the official manager then, in the tournament Raoul Daufresne coached the squad.) 🥇 SO 1924 – Round 2
Viktor Löwenfeld	(Austria)	1928–1930	11	5	2	4	45.45	1.55	SO 1928 – Quarter-finals
Hector Goetinck (1)	(Belgium)	1930–1934	31	7	5	19	22.58	0.84	WC 1930 – Round 1 WC 1934 – Round 1
Jules Turnauer	(Hungary)	1935	3	0	1	2	0.00	0.33	—
Jack Butler	(England)	1935–1939	32	8	7	17	25.00	0.97	WC 1938 – Round 1 SO 1936
Hector Goetinck (2)	(Belgium)	1939–1940	0	0	0	0	—	—	—
Selection committee (3)	—	1940–1943	0	0	0	0	—	—	—
François Demol	(Belgium)	1944–1946	8	2	2	4	25.00	1.00	—
Bill Gormlie	(England)	1947–1953	44	18	9	17	40.91	1.43	WC 1950 (Note: Belgium withdrew from the qualifiers.)
Doug Livingstone	(Scotland)	1953–1954	13	5	6	2	38.46	1.62	WC 1954 – Group stage
André Vandeweyer	(Belgium)	1955–1957	17	4	2	11	23.53	0.82	—
Louis Nicolay^{ct}	(Belgium)	1957	1	1	0	0	100.00	3.00	—
Géza Toldi	(Hungary)	1957–1958	6	1	2	3	16.67	0.83	WC 1958
Constant Vanden Stock (Note: Manager Vanden Stock only selected the players; under him, the Red Devils were consecutively trained by Viktor Havlicek (1958–60), Henri Dekens (1960–61), Arthur Ceuleers (1961–65) and Raymond Goethals (1966–68).)	(Belgium)	1958–1968	68	28	11	29	41.18	1.40	EC 1960, (Note: Belgium did not enter the qualifiers.) WC 1962, EC 1964, WC 1966, EC 1968
Raymond Goethals	(Belgium)	1968–1976	44	25	8	11	56.82	1.89	WC 1970 – Group stage EC 1972 – Third place 🥉 WC 1974, EC 1976
Guy Thys (1)	(Belgium)	1976–1989	101	45	24*	32	44.55	1.57	WC 1978; EC 1980 – Runners-up 🥈 WC 1982 – Round 2 EC 1984 – Group stage WC 1986 – Fourth place EC 1988
Walter Meeuws	(Belgium)	1989–1990	6	2	3	1	33.33	1.50	—
Guy Thys (2)	(Belgium)	1990–1991	13	4	4	5	30.77	1.23	WC 1990 – Round of 16; EC 1992
Paul Van Himst	(Belgium)	1991–1996	36	19	5	12	52.78	1.72	WC 1994 – Round of 16; EC 1996
Wilfried Van Moer	(Belgium)	1996	5	2	2	1	40.00	1.60	—
Georges Leekens (1)	(Belgium)	1997–1999	29	10	10*	9	34.48	1.38	WC 1998 – Group stage
Robert Waseige	(Belgium)	1999–2002	34	16	11 (Note: During a 2001 friendly draw against Czech Republic, assistants Vince Briganti and Jacky Munaron managed the team as Waseige recovered from cardiac bypass surgery.)	7	47.06	1.74	EC 2000 – Group stage WC 2002 – Round of 16
Aimé Anthuenis	(Belgium)	2002–2005	29	12	7	10	41.38	1.48	EC 2004, WC 2006
René Vandereycken	(Belgium)	2005–2009	30	10	7	13	33.33	1.23	EC 2008, WC 2010
Franky Vercauteren^{ct}	(Belgium)	2009	5	0	1	4	0.00	0.20	—
Dick Advocaat	(Netherlands)	2009–2010	5	3	0	2	60.00	1.80	—
Georges Leekens (2)	(Belgium)	2010–2012	19	8	7	4	42.10	1.63	EC 2012
Marc Wilmots (Note: Wilmots was only a caretaker in his first two matches against Montenegro and England. In June, first the player group and later also the Belgian Football Association chose him as permanent coach.)	(Belgium)	2012–2016	49 (Note: Note that the friendlies against Romania on 14 November 2012 and against Luxembourg on 26 May 2014 are not FIFA-recognised due to an excessive number of substitutions.)	33	8	8	67.35	2.18	WC 2014 – Quarter-finals; EC 2016 – Quarter-finals
Roberto Martínez	(Spain)	2016–2022	80	56	13	11	70.00	2.26	WC 2018 – Third place 🥉 NL Finals 2019; EC 2020 – Quarter-finals; NL Finals 2021 – Fourth place WC 2022 – Group stage NL Finals 2023
Domenico Tedesco	(Italy) (Germany)	2023–2025	24	12	6	6	50.00	1.75	EC 2024 – Round of 16; NL Finals 2025
Rudi Garcia	(France) (Spain)	2025–2026	20	12	6	2	60.00	2.10	WC 2026 – Quarter-finals
Mark van Bommel	(Netherlands)	2026–	0	0	0	0			
Totals			866	385	184	297	44.46	1.55	26 out of 50 tournaments
* / Draws include knockout matches decided via penalty shoot-out.; ** / Abbreviations: SO = Summer Olympics, WC = FIFA World Cup, EC = UEFA European Championship, NL = UEFA Nations League; (1), (2) / first term, second term; ^{ct} / caretaker manager

Last updated: Spain v. Belgium, 10 July 2026. Statistics include official FIFA-recognised matches only.
