= De Saedeleer =

De Saedeleer is a surname. Notable people include:

- Alexandre De Saedeleer, a Belgian field hockey player
- Henri De Saedeleer (fl.1920s), a naturalist
- Rik De Saedeleer (1924–2013), a Belgian football player, columnist and sports commentator
- Valerius de Saedeleer (1867–1941), a Belgian landscape painter
