= Lierse SK (1906) =

Association football club in Belgium

- Full name: Koninklijke Lierse Sportkring
- Nickname: De Pallieters
- Short name: Lierse
- Founded: 6 March 1906; 120 years ago
- Dissolved: 9 May 2018; 8 years ago
- Ground: Herman Vanderpoortenstadion, Lier
- Capacity: 14,538
- Owner: Maged Samy
- League: Proximus League
- Final season; 2017–18: 4th of 8 (folded)
- Website: www.lierse.com
Home colours	Away colours

Koninklijke Lierse Sportkring (Dutch pronunciation: [ˈkoːnɪŋkləkə ˈliːrsə ˈspɔrtkrɪŋ]), often simply known as Lierse, was a Belgian professional football club from the city of Lier in the Antwerp province. Lierse have won four championship titles and two Belgian Cups. Lierse was one of the eight Belgian clubs to have played in the UEFA Champions League group stage, the others being Anderlecht, Antwerp, Club Brugge, Genk, Standard Liège, Union Saint-Gilloise and KAA Gent.

The club was founded in 1906 and was initially promoted to the first division in 1927–28. Lierse was relatively successful in the first division until the end of World War II, winning two titles and finishing only four times outside the top five. At the end of the 1947–48 season, they were relegated to the second division. Lierse enjoyed two more spells at the highest level, each time with a championship win (between 1953–54 and 1985–86 and between 1988–89 and 2006–07). Lierse spent five more years in the first division between 2010–11 and 2014–15, but then played in the second division until it was dissolved.

Lierse played their home matches at the Herman Vanderpoortenstadion in Lier, which is also known as Het Lisp, because the stadium is located in a neighbourhood named Lisp. Both the logo and home kit featured the club colours of yellow and black. The club was bought by Egyptian businessman Maged Samy, who also owns Wadi Degla in Egypt and was the owner and president of KV Turnhout until 30 June 2014.

The most capped player at the club was Bernard Voorhoof with 61 caps for Belgium, all when he was at Lierse. With 30 goals, he was the topscorer of the Belgium national football team together with Paul Van Himst, until Romelu Lukaku (who played in Lierse's youth squads) surpassed this record.

A few well known players, Vandenbergh, Van Minsel, Van Moer, Snelders, Vandermeulen.

On 9 May 2018, the team announced that it requested bankruptcy.

After the bankruptcy of the team, negotiations started with Lyra and Oosterzonen. Eventually two teams with the name Lierse were formed: K. Lyra-Lierse and K. Lierse Kempenzonen. K. Lierse Kempenzonen currently plays with the old Lierse S.K. logo at the Herman Vanderpoortenstadion.

== History ==
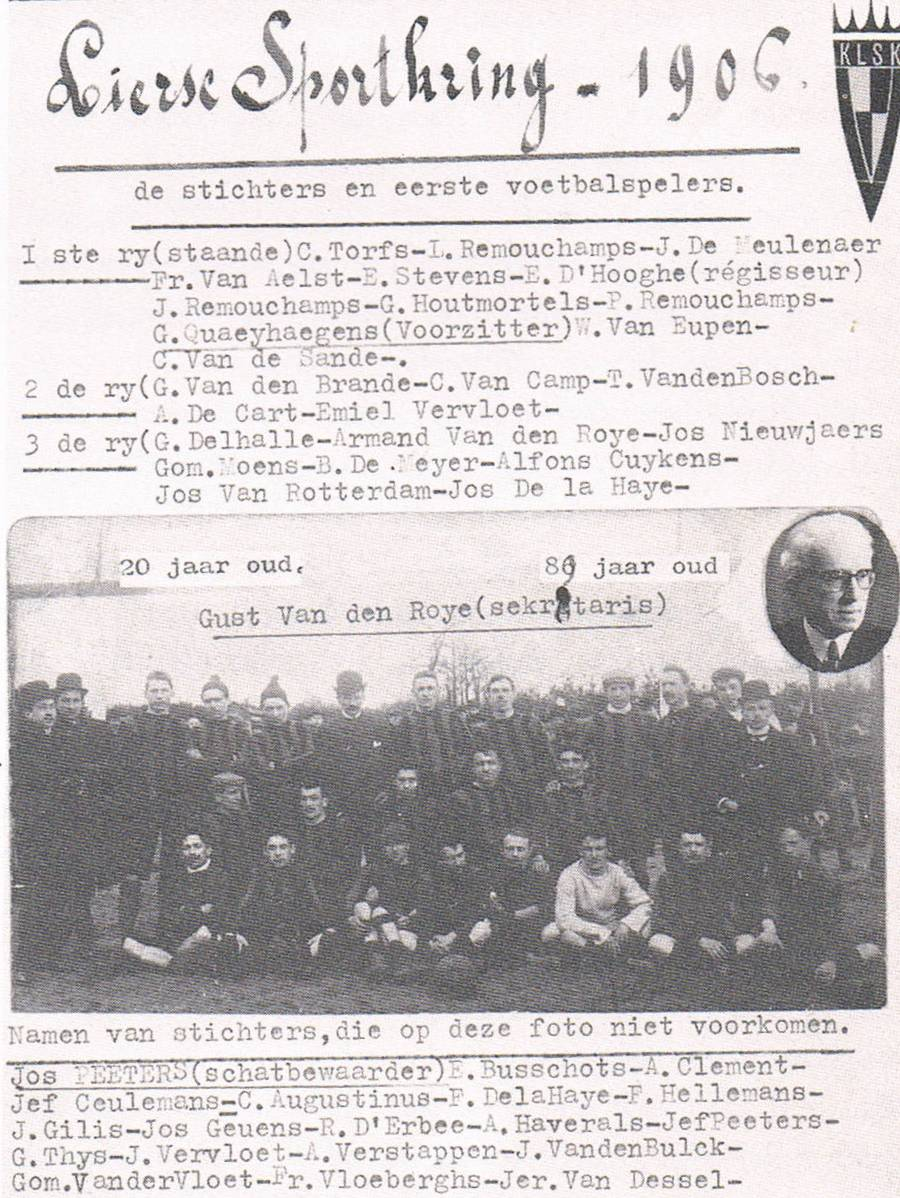
Lierse SK in 1906: Founders and first players

=== The early years ===
In 1904, Gustaaf Van Den Roye learned about the game of football in Antwerp and got fascinated about it. He bought an authentic ball to play the game in his hometown of Lier. The first games were played on a terrain owned by the local graf Marnix de Sainte-Aldegonde. Local farmers were not pleased and the police had to intervene, who prohibited any further games. The graf was informed of what happened and he asked Van Den Roye to come and see him. When Van Den Roye told the Graf about his intent to start an actual football club and pointed out the difficulties he was faced with, The Graf promised him a terrain which could serve as a football ground.

On 6 March 1906, during a meeting in a local pub called De Roskam a football club was founded, named Liersche Sportkring. Lierse was born and a first board was established: Gerard Quaeyhaegens as chairman, Gust van den Roye as secretary and Georges Peeters as Treasurer. Graf Marnix de Sainte-Aldegonde agreed to become honorary chairman.

Two years after its foundation, in September 1908, Lierse became a member of the Royal Belgian Football Association, where it started playing in the lowest tier of Belgian Football. In 1913 the club made its first impact in Belgian football, when it became the first club ever out a regional league to reach the quarter-finals of the Belgian Cup. The club climbed through the ranks of Belgian football. In 1922, after winning a national play-off round Lierse gained promotion to the national levels of Belgian Football, which they would never leave until present.

=== 1927–1948: First spell at the highest level ===
Five years after reaching the national levels, in 1927, Lierse became champions in division 1 the second tier of Belgian football, with a 2 points advantage over RSC Anderlecht. In doing so, Lierse succeeded promotion to the highest level for the first time in its history. This first spell in the top tier proved to be very successful immediately as Lierse became champions for the first time in 1932. In the 12 seasons that followed they finished only 1 time outside the top 5, becoming runner up in 1935 and 1939, and winning the championship again in 1941 (unofficial due to World War II) and 1942.

One of the major factors of the success of the club in this period was Bernard Voorhoof, who scored 350 goals in 529 matches for the club. He was voted "Lierse player of the century" when the club celebrated its 100th anniversary in 2006. Until now Voorhoof is also still the topscorer of the Belgium national football team with 30 goals in 61 matches and he is one of the four players worldwide to have competed in all 3 FIFA World Cups before World War II.

The second World War had its impact on the club though. 2 players of the club, national goalkeeper Frans Christiaens and Frans Vervoort died during allied bombardments on a factory in German-occupied Mortsel. Also Jules Van Craen, topscorer of the Belgian League in the 1943 season died during the war. In the season 1944–45 Lierse, together with three other clubs from the Antwerp area, did not compete in the league, due to the German bombardments on the Port of Antwerp. These facts, combined with some of the older players retiring caused the club to decline until they finished bottom of the league in 1948. After 21 years at the highest level, Lierse were relegated for the first time in its history.

=== 1953–2018 ===
In 1953, Lierse secured promotion to the highest level once again.

In 1960, K. Lierse S.K won their third championship title, and distinguished themselves at European level.

In 1969, Lierse won the Belgian Cup for the first time.

21 September 1971, is considered an important day for Lierse. Two weeks earlier, Lierse had lost 0–2 at home to the far superior Leeds United in the first round of the UEFA Cup. Nobody expected that Lierse would win in Leeds, but Lierse had an improbably 0–4 win, and Leeds, the Cup holders, were knocked out.

In 1986, Lierse were again relegated, but in 1988, they were promoted back to the top division. Keeping up with the elite clubs in Belgium had now become the top priority. Rich clubs such as Anderlecht and Club Bruges reigned supreme in the Belgian League.

1991–1994: Telefusion Belgium sponsored Lierse in these years.

In 1997, Lierse became league champions again, to a large amount of people's surprise. The hotly tipped favourites, Club Bruges, were surprisingly beaten to the title by Lierse.

Two years later (1999), Lierse won the Belgian Cup again.

In May 2018, owner Maged Samy and David Nakhid failed to agree on terms for a possible acquisition, making the future of the club uncertain.

=== Managers ===
Lierse S.K. coaching history from 1930 to present
(Kingdom of Hungary (1920–1946)) Gyula "Jules" Turnauer (1930–36); (England) Bill Berry (1 July 1946 – 30 June 1948); (England) Keith Spurgeon (1970); (Netherlands) Frans de Munck (1971); (Hungarian People's Republic) János Bédl (1 July 1972 – 30 June 1973); (Netherlands) Hans Croon (1974–75); (Hungarian People's Republic) János Bédl (1 July 1975 – 30 June 1977); (Belgium) Gustaaf Vandenbergh (1977–79); (West Germany) Ernst Künnecke (1979–81); (Hungary) János Bédl (1 July 1981 – 30 June 1982); (Netherlands) Hans Croon (1982–83); (Netherlands) Johan Boskamp (1984–87); (Belgium) Walter Meeuws (1 July 1987 – 1 March 1988); (Socialist Federal Republic of Yugoslavia) Dimitri Davidović (1 July 1988 – 30 June 1989); (Netherlands) Barry Hulshoff (1989–91); (Belgium) Herman Helleputte (1991–94); (Belgium) Eric Gerets (1 July 1994 – 30 June 1997); (Belgium) Jos Daerden (1 July 1997 – 1 July 1998); (Belgium) Walter Meeuws (1 July 1998 – 30 June 2001); (Belgium) Regi Van Acker (2001–02)	(Belgium) Emilio Ferrera (1 July 2002 – 18 May 2004); (Belgium) Paul Put (1 July 2004 – 2 November 2005); (Belgium) Eric van Meir (interim) (Nov 2005); (Netherlands) René Trost (7 November 2005 – 13 November 2006); (Norway) Kjetil Rekdal (22 November 2006 – 25 June 2007); (Belgium) Herman Helleputte (1 July 2007 – 18 February 2010); (Belgium) Aime Anthuenis (21 February 2010 – 19 September 2010); (Belgium) Eric Van Meir (19 September 2010 – 3 January 2011); (Norway) Trond Sollied (3 January 2011 – 30 June 2011); (Belgium) Chris Janssens (1 July 2011 – 12 November 2012); (Belgium) Herman Vermeulen (interim) (1 November 2012 – 12 November 2012); (Egypt) Hany Ramzy (Nov 2012–13); (Netherlands) Stanley Menzo (1 July 2013 – 31 August 2014); (Slovenia) Slaviša Stojanović (5 September 2014 – 28 January 2015); (Belgium) Herman Helleputte (28 January 2015 – 30 January 2015); (France) Olivier Guillou (30 January 2015 – 31 May 2015); (France) Younes Zerdouk (10 June 2015 – 14 September 2015); (Belgium) Eric Van Meir (15 September 2015 – 15 March 2017); (Belgium) Frederik Vanderbiest (16 March 2017 – 6 October 2017); (Belgium) Will Still (6 October 2017 – 2 December 2017)

== Honours ==
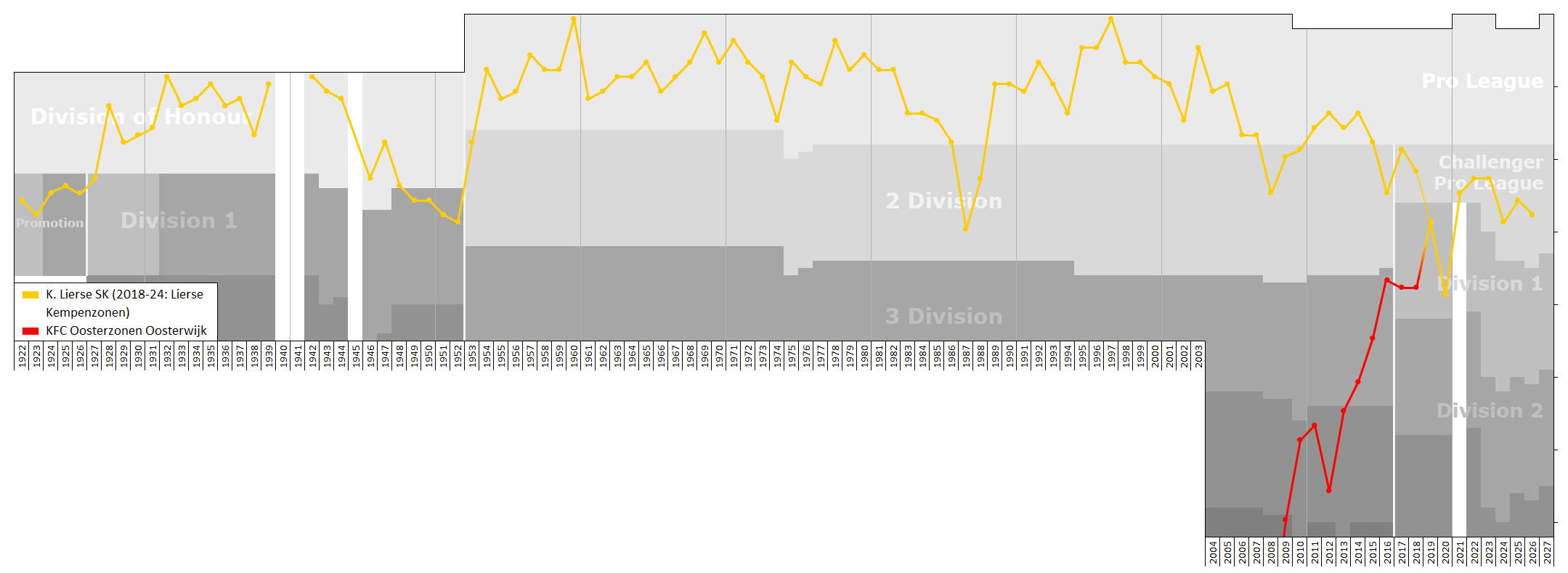
Historical chart of Lierse SK league performance

=== League ===
- Belgian First Division
  - Champions: 1931–32, 1941–42, 1959–60, 1996–97
  - Runners-up: 1934–35, 1938–39
- Belgian Second Division
  - Winners: 1926–27, 2009–10
  - Runners-up (5): 1924–25, 1948–49, 1949–50, 1952–53, 2008–09
- Belgian Second Division final round
  - Winners: 1974, 1988, 2006

=== Cups ===
- Belgian Cup
  - Winners: 1968–69, 1998–99
  - Runners-up: 1975–76
- Belgian Super Cup
  - Winners: 1997, 1999

== European record ==
As of 2019

Competition	Appearances	Matches played	Won	Drawn	Lost	Goals for	Goals against
UEFA Champions League	2	10	1	1	8	6	19
Cup Winners' Cup	2	6	3	0	3	12	12
UEFA Cup	5	18	5	3	10	28	28
Intertoto Cup	2	12	6	0	6	21	16

== Stadium ==
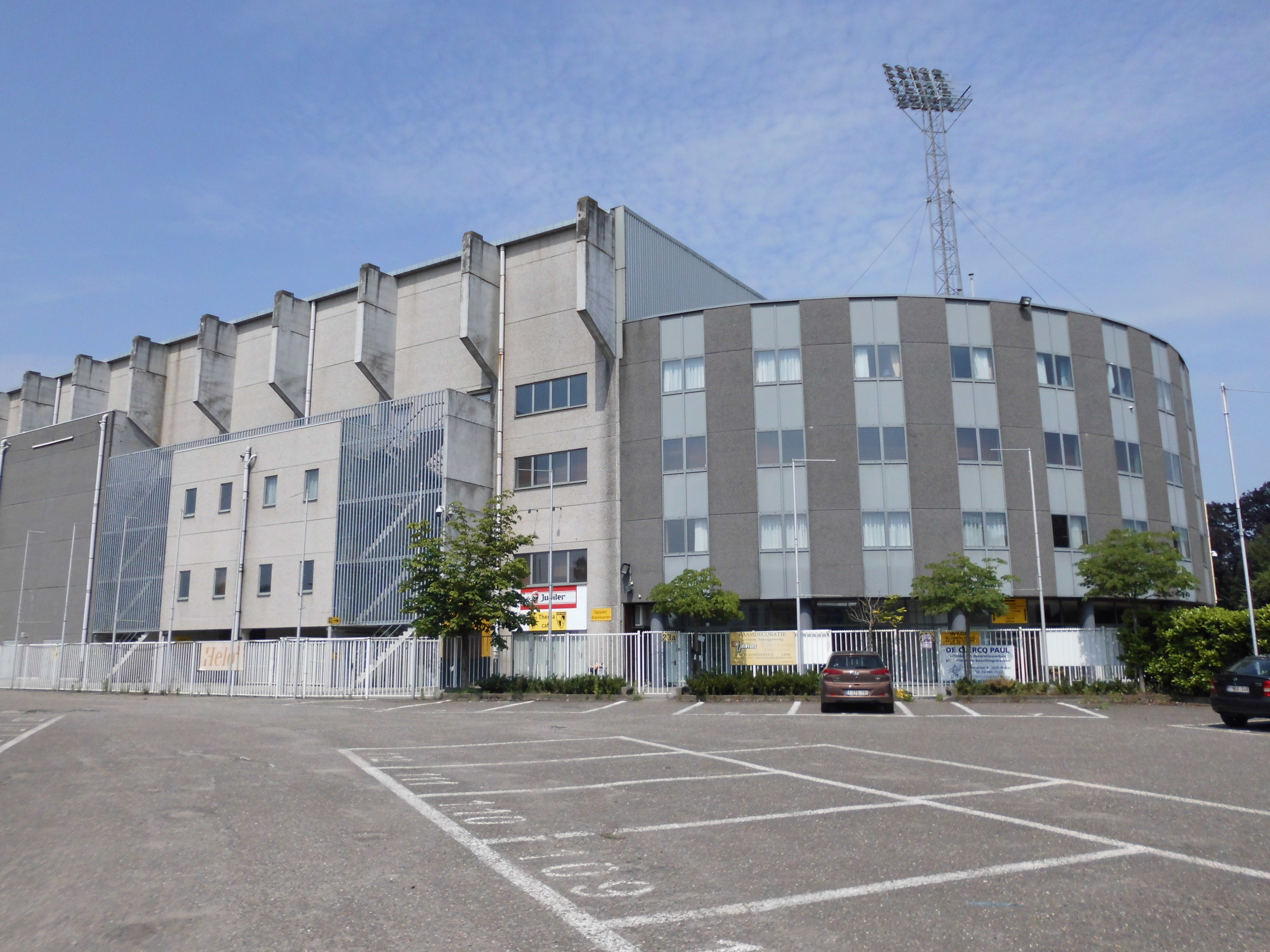
Stadium Lierse anno 2018

Since 1925 Lierse played in the Herman Vanderpoortenstadion often referred to as Lisp. The latter is the location of the stadium in the residential area Lisp. The stadium has a capacity of 14,538.
