= Jules Turnauer =

Hungarian football manager

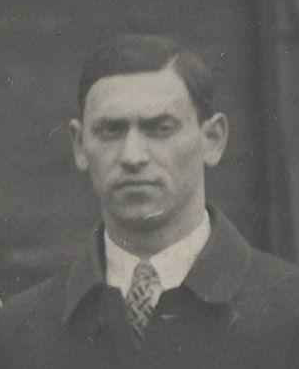
- Turnauer in 1932

Personal information
- Full name: Gyula Turnauer
- Date of birth: 2 May 1899
- Place of birth: Hungary

Managerial career
- Years: Team
- 1930–1936: Lierse SK
- 1935: Belgium
- January 1945–1946: ROC Charleroi
- July–October 1952: FSV Frankfurt

Gyula "Jules" Turnauer, was a former Hungarian football manager of Belgian and German teams, including the Belgium national football team.

== Managerial career ==
Even though Turnauer contributed to Belgian football history by managing the squad of Lierse SK that won the Belgian Championship in 1932 for its first time, and leading the Belgium national football team, little is known about his total managerial career and his life in general. Many years after having managed Belgium's national team during three internationals, he trained ROC Charleroi and FSV Frankfurt for short periods.

== Managerial achievements ==
Lierse SK
Belgian First Division
- Winner (1): 1931–32

Belgium national football team

- 3 matches as head coach
