= Henri Dekens =

Belgian footballer and manager

Personal information
- Date of birth: 27 June 1914
- Place of birth: Anderlecht, Belgium
- Date of death: 1976
- Position: Winger

Youth career
- 1924–1932: RSC Anderlecht

Senior career*
Years	Team	Apps	(Gls)
1932–1942	RSC Anderlecht	78	(8)
1942–1946	Union Saint-Gilloise		
1946–1947	ARA La Gantoise		

Managerial career
- 1960–1961: Belgium (as trainer, with Vanden Stock as selector)
- 1963–1965: Club Brugge
- 1967–1969: RAEC Mons
- * Club domestic league appearances and goals

Henri "Rie" Dekens (Anderlecht, 27 June 1914 - 1976) was a former Belgian football player and trainer. He started his career as player with RSC Anderlecht and afterwards he coached among others Club Brugge, Thor Waterschei and the Belgium national football team (with Constant Vanden Stock as national player selector).

== Playing career ==
Henri Dekens was born shortly before World War I; he grew up in the municipality of Anderlecht, Brussels and affiliated with the local club SC Anderlecht at the age of 10. In 1935 he made his debut in the A-selection. Dekens was an attacking winger and in those days he had players as Constant Vanden Stock as companion. After 10 years he made the move to city rival Union Saint-Gilloise. He ended his career as footballer at ARA La Gantoise.

== Managerial career ==
After his player career Dekens started training Union. In the 1950s he arrived at second division team Thor Waterschei. In 1954 he guided the Limburgian team to Belgium's First Division. In 1957 he relegated for a short while with Waterschei, but one year later the club promoted to the highest division again. In 1960 under supervision of player selector Constant Vanden Stock he also trained the national squad.

In 1963 Club Brugge took away the Bruxellois from Waterschei to overcome the problematic results. Dekens was assigned as successor of Juan Schwanner, and ensured a prolonged stay of "Blue-Black" in First Class. One season later he was fired because of poor results. Afterwards he also trained RAEC Mons, RRFC Montegnée and again Waterschei.

Outside football Dekens had good relations with the Belgian royal family. It has been told that he taught the princes Alexander, Baudouin and Albert how to play football. Dekens died in 1976 at the age of 62.

== Player palmares ==
RSC Anderlecht

- Belgian Second Division

Winner (1): 1934–35

== Manager palmares ==
Thor Waterschei

- Belgian Second Division

Winner (2): 1953–54, 1957–58

Belgium national football team

- 8 matches as trainer
