= Herman Helleputte =

Belgian football manager

Personal information
- Date of birth: 22 March 1954 (age 72)
- Place of birth: Lier, Belgium
- Position: Defender

Senior career*
Years	Team	Apps	(Gls)
1971–1988	Lierse		

Managerial career
- 1988–1991: Lierse (assistant)
- 1991–1994: Lierse
- 1994–1995: Germinal Ekeren
- 1996–1999: Germinal Ekeren
- 1999–2000: Germinal Beerschot Antwerpen (assistant)
- 2000: Harelbeke
- 2001: Dessel Sport
- 2002–2005: Beveren
- 2005–2007: Westerlo
- 2007–2010: Lierse
- 2010–2011: Lierse (director of sports)
- 2011–2012: Wadi Degla (scout)
- 2012–2018: Lierse (academy)
- * Club domestic league appearances and goals

Herman Helleputte (born 22 March 1954) is a Belgian former football player and manager who played as a defender. A one-club man while playing for Lierse, he is also best known for managing that club.

== Honours ==
=== Manager ===
Germinal Ekeren

- Belgian Cup: 1996–97
