= Rik De Saedeleer =

Belgian footballer, columnist, and television sports commentator

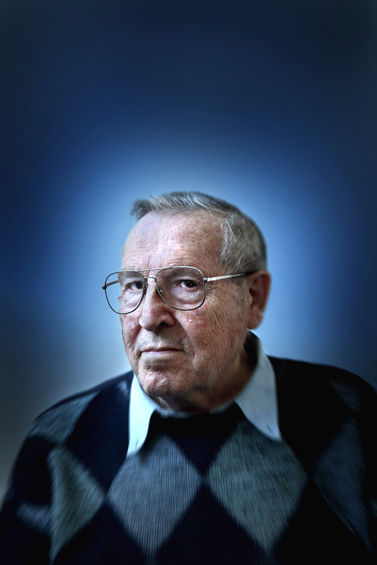
- Foto: Filip Naudts

Personal information
- Full name: Rik De Saedeleer
- Date of birth: 17 January 1924
- Place of birth: Mechelen, Belgium
- Date of death: 3 March 2013 (aged 89)
- Place of death: Knokke, Belgium
- Position: Midfielder

Senior career*
Years	Team	Apps	(Gls)
1939–1954	Racing Mechelen	285	(160)
- * Club domestic league appearances and goals

Rik De Saedeleer (17 January 1924 – 3 March 2013) was a Belgian footballer, columnist and television sports commentator.

== Playing career ==
De Saedeleer played the majority of his career at hometown club Racing Mechelen with whom he was runner-up in the 1951–52 Belgian First Division and was once called up for the Belgium national team for a 1949 friendly match against a squad made up of London-based professionals.

== Media career ==
After retiring as a player, De Saedeleer wanted to be a football coach but instead became columnist at Het Laatste Nieuws and Belgium's best known football commentator, reporting from several World Cups. He was known for his emotional and humorous reports. He retired after the 1998 FIFA World Cup in France.

He died on 3 March 2013 after spending most of his final years in hospital. He was survived by his wife and two daughters.

== Bibliography ==
- Rik De Saedeleer (1990). Goooooal! Goal! Goal! (in Dutch). ISBN 9789050960632.
- Carl Huybrechts; Benno Wauters; Rik De Saedeleer (2011). Rik De Saedeleer: de stem van ons voetbal: memoires [Rik De Saedeleer: the voice of our football: memoirs] (in Dutch). ISBN 9789089312501.
