= Louis Nicolay =

Belgian sports delegate

Personal information
- Date of birth: ?
- Date of death: ?

Managerial career
- Years: Team
- 1957: Belgium

Louis Nicolay was a Belgian sports delegate and one-day (caretaker) manager of the Belgium national football team.

== Managerial career ==
After the dismissal of Belgian national coach André Vandewyer, no successor was assigned. Therefore Nicolay, who was part of the Belgian selection committee, took over the managerial role for one game in Belgium's 1958 FIFA World Cup qualifying campaign. This match on 4 September 1957 was a success as the national squad beat Iceland by 2–5. After this match, the Hungarian Géza Toldi became Belgium's next permanent manager. Because of this, Nicolay has been the only Belgium coach with a 100% victory rate as of 2016.
