= Belgium national football team =

Men's association football team

Belgium
- Nickname: The Red Devils (Note: Dutch: De Rode Duivels French: Les Diables rouges German: Die Roten Teufel)
- Association: Royal Belgian Football Association (RBFA)
- Confederation: UEFA (Europe)
- Head coach: Mark van Bommel
- Captain: Youri Tielemans
- Most caps: Jan Vertonghen (157) (Note: Caps and goals against Romania on 15 (actually 14) November 2012, against Luxembourg on 26 May 2014 and against Czech Republic on 5 June 2017 were counted by RBFA but are not officially recognised by FIFA – the former two due to an excessive number of substitutions according to the Laws of the Game, the latter because the Belgian and Czech football federations were too late in requesting an official match.)
- Top scorer: Romelu Lukaku (94)
- Home stadium: King Baudouin Stadium
- FIFA code: BEL
First colours	Second colours

FIFA ranking
- Current: 8 (18 November 2026)
- Highest: 1 (November 2015 – March 2016, September 2018 – March 2022)
- Lowest: 71 (June 2007)

First international
- Belgium 3–3 France (Uccle, Belgium; 1 May 1904)

Biggest win
- Belgium 9–0 Zambia (Brussels, Belgium; 4 June 1994); Belgium 10–1 San Marino (Brussels, Belgium; 28 February 2001); Belgium 9–0 Gibraltar (Liège, Belgium; 31 August 2017); Belgium 9–0 San Marino (Brussels, Belgium; 10 October 2019)

Biggest defeat
- England Amateurs 11–2 Belgium (London, England; 17 April 1909)

World Cup
- Appearances: 15 (first in 1930)
- Best result: Third place (2018)

European Championship
- Appearances: 7 (first in 1972)
- Best result: Runners-up (1980)

Nations League Finals
- Appearances: 1 (first in 2021)
- Best result: Fourth place (2021)

Olympic Games
- Appearances: 4 (first in 1900)
- Best result: Champions (1920)
Medal record
Men's football
FIFA World Cup
Bronze medal – third place	2018 Russia	Team
UEFA European Championship
Silver medal – second place	1980 Italy	Team
Bronze medal – third place	1972 Belgium	Team
Olympic Games
Gold medal – first place	1920 Belgium	Team
Bronze medal – third place	1900 France	Team
- Website: rbfa.be

The Belgium national football team (Note: Dutch: Belgisch nationaal voetbalelftal French: Équipe nationale belge de football German: Belgische Fußballnationalmannschaft) has represented Belgium in men's international football since their maiden match in 1904. The squad is under the global jurisdiction of FIFA and is governed in Europe by UEFA—both of which were co-founded by the Belgian team's supervising body, the Royal Belgian Football Association. Periods of regular Belgian representation at the highest international level, from 1920 to 1938, from 1980 to 2002 and again from 2014 onwards, have alternated with mostly unsuccessful qualification rounds. Most of Belgium's home matches are played at the King Baudouin Stadium in Brussels.

Belgium's national team have participated in three quadrennial major football competitions. It appeared in fifteen FIFA World Cups and seven UEFA European Championships, and featured at four Olympic football tournaments, including the 1920 Summer Olympics which they won. Other notable performances are victories over four reigning world champions—West Germany, Brazil, Argentina and France—between 1954 and 2002. Belgium has long-standing football rivalries with its Dutch and French counterparts, having played both teams nearly every year from 1905 to 1967. The squad has been known as the Red Devils since 1906; its fan club is named "1895".

Belgium finished in third place as hosts at UEFA Euro 1972. After that, they experienced two golden generations. In the first period, which lasted from the 1980s to the early 1990s, the team finished as runners-up at UEFA Euro 1980 and fourth in the 1986 FIFA World Cup. In the second, under the guidance of Marc Wilmots and later Roberto Martínez in the 2010s, Belgium topped the FIFA World Ranking for the first time in November 2015 and finished third at the 2018 FIFA World Cup. To date, Belgium is the only national team to top the FIFA ranking without having won a World Cup or continental trophy.

== History ==
=== Early history ===
Belgium was one of the first mainland European countries to play association football, with the earliest recorded example of its practice in Belgium dating back to 1863.

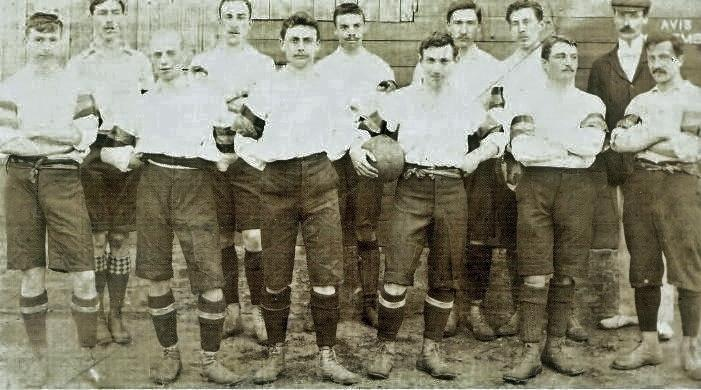
The first Belgium A-squad in 1901 featured four Englishmen

On 11 October 1900, Beerschot AC honorary president Jorge Díaz announced that Antwerp would host a series of challenge matches between Europe's best football teams. After some organisational problems, on 28 April 1901, Beerschot's pitch hosted its first tournament, in which a Belgian selection and a Dutch team made up of players from third-level sides led by ex-footballer Cees van Hasselt contested the Coupe Vanden Abeele. Naturally, the hosts had little trouble claiming the cup, defeating the Netherlands by 8–0. Belgium then beat the Netherlands in all three follow-up matches; FIFA does not recognize these results because Belgium fielded some English players, such as Herbert Potts, who scored 12 of "Belgium's" 17 goals.

On 1 May 1904, the Belgians played their first official match, against France at the Stade du Vivier d'Oie in Uccle; their draw left the Évence Coppée Trophy unclaimed. Twenty days later, the football boards of both countries were among the seven FIFA founders. At that time, the Belgian squad was chosen by a committee chaired by Édouard de Laveleye, who usually drew from the country's six or seven major clubs. Belgium would play twice a year against the Netherlands beginning from 1905 onwards, generally once in Antwerp and once in Rotterdam. From these beginnings until 1925, Belgian-Dutch cup trophies would be awarded in the "Low Countries derby".

In 1906, the national team received the nickname Red Devils because of their red jerseys, and four years later, Scottish ex-footballer William Maxwell replaced the UBSSA committee as their manager. From 1912, UBSSA governed football only and was renamed UBSFA. (Note: UBSFA was the acronym for the organisation's French name: Union Belge des Sociétés de Football-Association. In 1920 it received the title of "Royal Union" for its 25th year of existence, and hence became the Royal Belgian Football Association.) During the Great War, the national team only played unrecognized friendlies, with matches in and against France.

=== Olympic gold and World Cup struggles ===
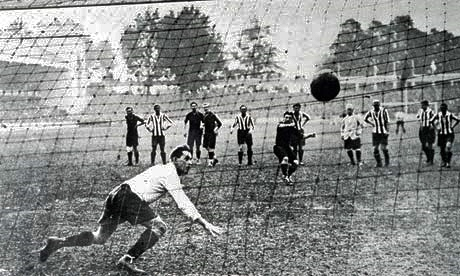
In the 1920 Olympic football final at the Olympisch Stadion in Antwerp, Robert Coppée scored a penalty kick for Belgium

At the 1920 Summer Olympics, in their first official Olympics appearance, the Red Devils won the gold medal on home soil after a controversial final in which their Czechoslovak opponents left the pitch. In the three 1920s Summer Olympic, they achieved fair results (four wins in seven matches), and played their first intercontinental match, against Argentina.

However, over the following decade, Belgium lost all of their matches at the first three FIFA World Cup final tournaments. According to historian Richard Henshaw, "[t]he growth of [football] in Scandinavia, Central Europe, and South America left Belgium far behind". Although World War II hindered international football events in the 1940s, the Belgian team remained active with unofficial matches against squads of other allied nations.

Belgium qualified for only one of eight major tournaments during the 1950s and the 1960s: the 1954 World Cup. The day before the tournament began, the RBFA was among the three UEFA founders. Dutch journalists considered the draw of the 1954 Belgian team in their opener against England to be the most surprising result of that match day, even more than Switzerland's victory over the Italian "football stars". However, Belgium were eliminated after a loss to Italy in the second (and last) group match. Two bright spots in these decades were wins against World Cup holders: West Germany in 1954, and Brazil in 1963. Between these, Belgium defeated Hungary's Golden Team in 1956. The combination of failure in competitive matches, and success in exhibition matches, gave the Belgians the mock title of "world champions of the friendlies".

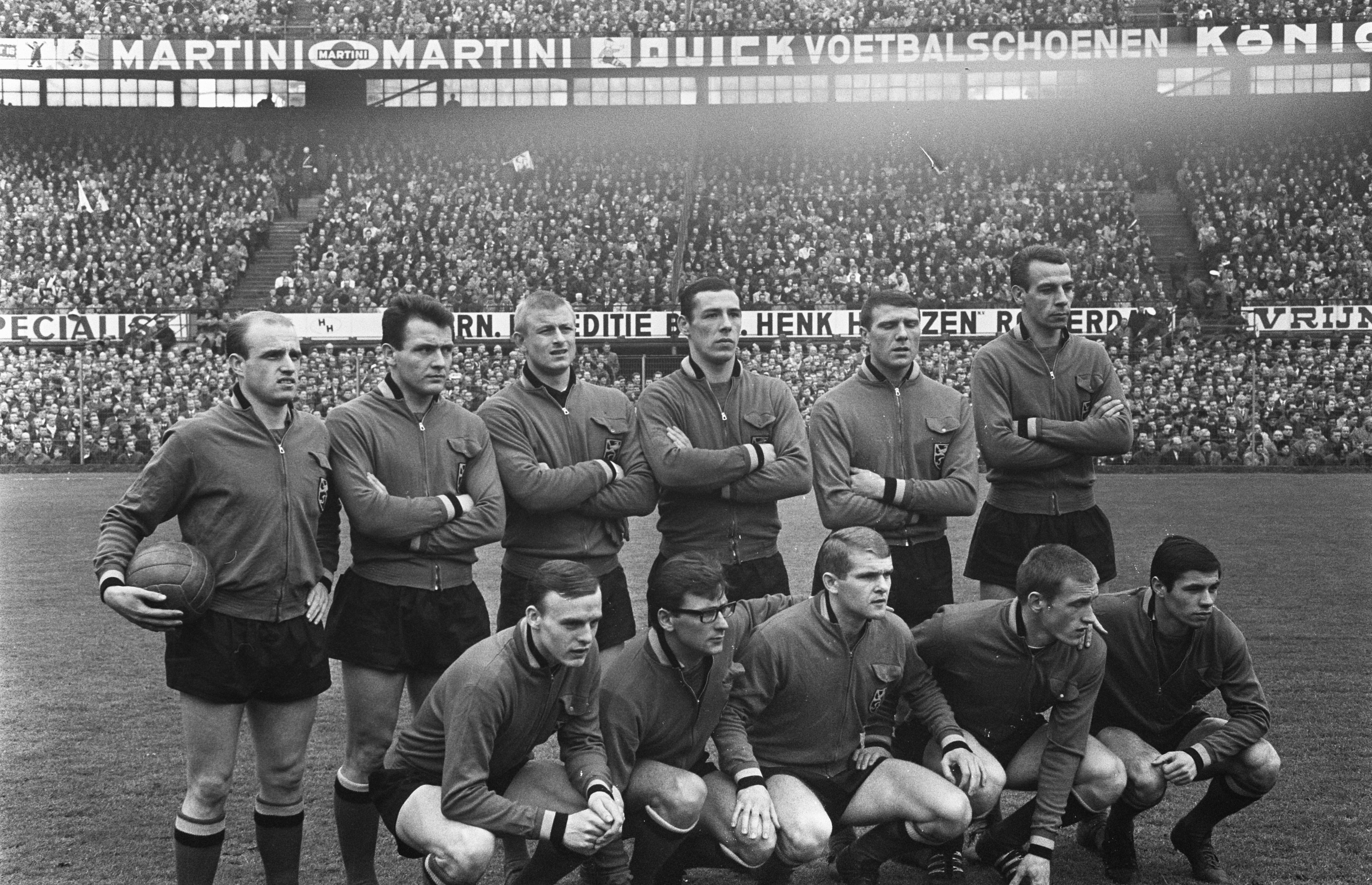
The Belgium squad at the start of a friendly game against the Netherlands, 1966

The team's performance improved during the early 1970s, under manager Raymond Goethals. Fully dressed in white, as the White Devils, Belgium achieved their first victories at the World Cup in 1970 and the Euros in 1972, their debut. En route to Euro 1972, they eliminated reigning European champions Italy by winning the two-legged quarter-final on aggregate. At the end stage, they finished third by winning the consolation match against Hungary. In 1973, the denial of a match-winning goal in their last 1974 FIFA World Cup qualification match for UEFA Group 3 cost Belgium their appearance at the final, causing Belgium to become the only nation ever to miss a World Cup final round despite not allowing a goal during the qualifiers. The next two attempts to reach a major final (Euro 1976 and the 1978 FIFA World Cup) were also fruitless.

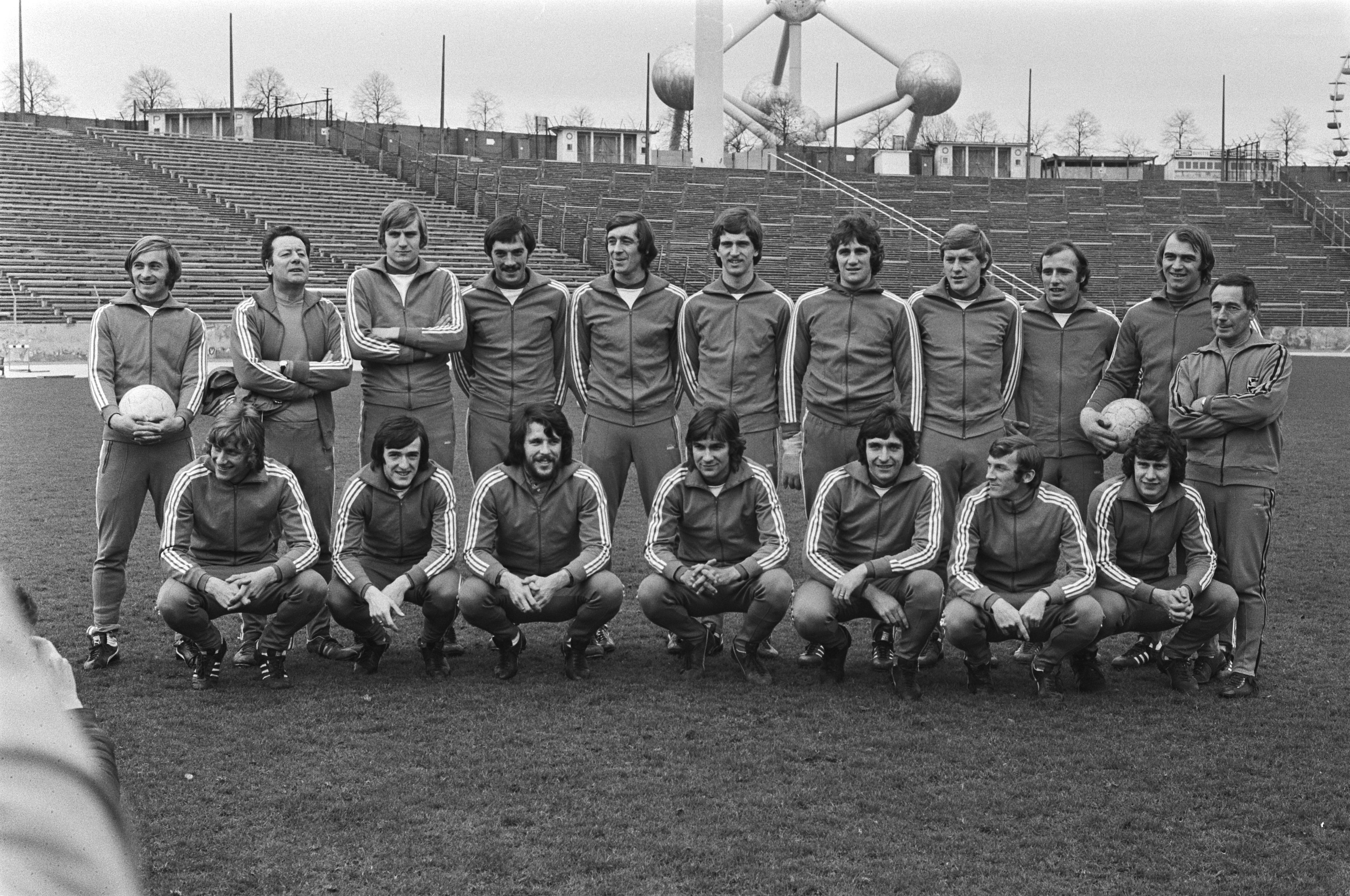
The Belgian national team before a training session in 1977

=== Golden age ===
Beginning with a second-place finish at Euro 1980, the 1980s and the early 1990s are generally considered as Belgium's first golden age. Coached by Guy Thys, they achieved their spot in the 1980 final with an unbeaten record in the group phase; in the final, they narrowly lost the title to West Germany 1–2. Starting with the 1982 World Cup, and ending with the 2002 World Cup, the national team qualified for six consecutive World Cups. During this period, managers Guy Thys, Paul Van Himst and Robert Waseige each guided Belgium past the first round. In addition to receiving individual FIFA recognitions, the team reached the semi-finals of the 1986 World Cup after eliminating the Soviet Union and Spain in the knockout stage. Argentina went through to the final after a 2–0 victory, in which their star player Diego Maradona scored both goals.

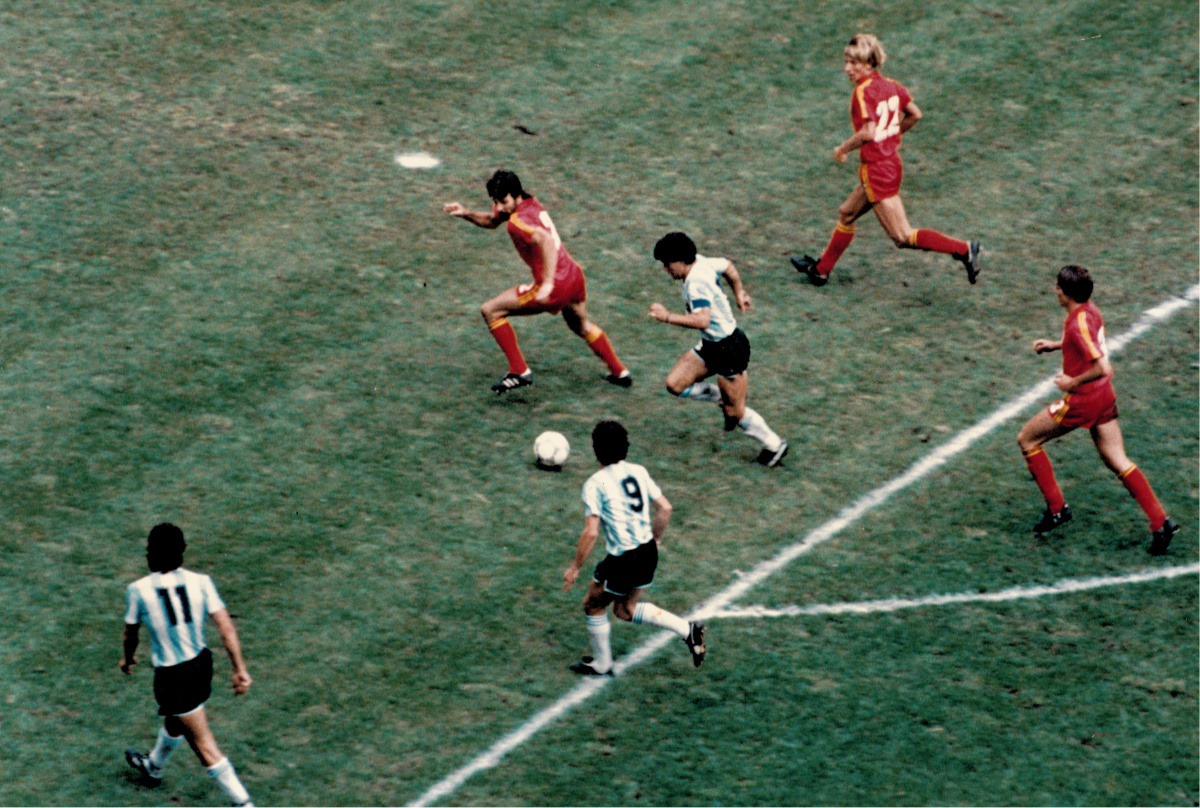
Diego Maradona and Argentina won 2–0 to knock Belgium out of the 1986 World Cup

After reaching the Euro 1980 final, they were unsuccessful at subsequent European Championships, with early exits from their appearances in 1984 and 2000. During the late 1990s, they played three friendly tournament in Morocco, Cyprus and Japan, sharing the 1999 Kirin Cup with Peru in the latter. Before the 2002 World Cup, Belgium defeated reigning world and European champions France. During that World Cup, Belgium defeated Russia and tied with co-host Japan and Tunisia to reach the round of 16. There they were eliminated by eventual world champions Brazil. Brazil coach Luiz Felipe Scolari would later state that their match against Belgium was the most difficult of the tournament.

After the 2002 World Cup, the team weakened with the loss of more veterans and coach Waseige. They missed out five successive major tournaments from UEFA Euro 2004 until UEFA Euro 2012, and went through an equal number of head coaches. A 2005 win over reigning European champions Greece meant nothing but a small comfort. In between, a promising new generation was maturing at the 2007 European U-21 Championship; Belgium's squad qualified for the following year's Summer Olympics in Beijing, where the Young Red Devils squad finished fourth. Seventeen of them appeared in the senior national team, albeit without making an immediate impact. Belgium finished in second (and last) place at the Kirin Cup in May 2009, and lost against 125th-ranked Armenian team in September 2009. After Georges Leekens' second stint as national manager, his assistant Marc Wilmots became the caretaker in May 2012.

=== Second golden age ===
After two matches as interim coach, Wilmots agreed to replace Leekens as manager. Following his appointment, the team's results improved, such that some foreign media regarded it as another Belgian golden generation. The young Belgian squad qualified as unbeaten group winners for the 2014 World Cup, and earned Belgium's second-ever place in the World Cup quarter-finals with a four-match winning streak.

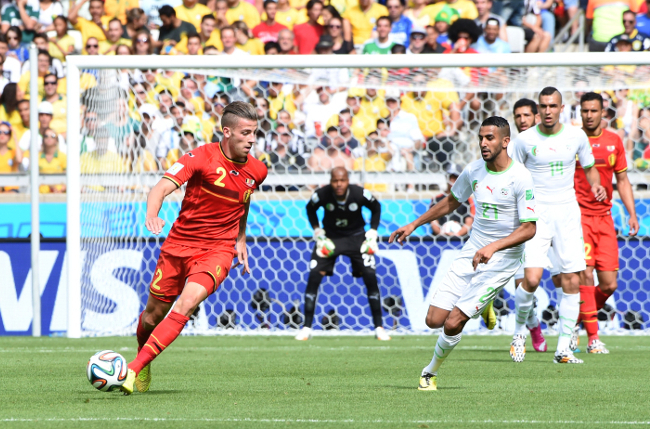
Belgium (in red) playing Algeria at the Mineirão at the 2014 World Cup

Belgium qualified for UEFA Euro 2016 with a match to spare in October 2015, and took No. 1 in the FIFA World Ranking for the first time in November 2015, to stay first for five months. At the Euros, Belgium were eliminated in the quarter-finals by Wales. This prompted the RBFA to dismiss Wilmots. In 2018 World Cup qualifying, they were seeded first in their group, and made the final tournament under Spanish manager Roberto Martínez, becoming the first European team besides hosts Russia to do so. At the World Cup, Belgium won all their group matches, against Panama, Tunisia and England, progressing to the knockout stage as group winners. In the round of 16 they trailed 2–0 against Japan, but eventually won 3–2 with a 94th minute winner by Nacer Chadli. The Red Devils defeated Brazil 2–1 in the quarter-finals, and would be eliminated in the semi-finals by eventual champions France. They eventually won the third place play-off against England. On 16 November 2019, for the first time in its history the team topped the World Football Elo Ratings, after a 1–4 away win over Russia during the Euro 2020 qualifiers.

Being considered one of the biggest contenders for the European trophy, the tournament was a complete disappointment for Belgium. Being drawn in Group B alongside Russia, Denmark and Finland, Belgium easily conquered the group with three wins. In the knockout phase, Belgium faced reigning champions Portugal in the round of 16 with a strike from Thorgan Hazard to give Belgium a 1–0 win. In the quarter-finals, Belgium faced Italy, failing to take revenge for their 2016 loss, suffering a 1–2 defeat, with the goal being scored by Romelu Lukaku, ending Belgium's campaign on a sad note.

At the 2022 World Cup in Qatar, Belgium were drawn into Group F alongside Croatia, Morocco and Canada. Despite starting their campaign well with a 1–0 victory over Canada, they suffered a shock 2–0 defeat to Morocco, and following a 0–0 draw with Croatia in their final group game, Belgium were knocked out of the tournament at the group stage for the first time since 1998. Following their elimination from the tournament, Martínez announced that he would be standing down as head coach after six years in charge of the national team.

In February 2023, it was announced that Domenico Tedesco had been appointed as the new head coach of the Belgian national team, replacing Roberto Martinez on a contract lasting until the end of Euro 2024. At the finals, Belgium were eliminated in the round of 16, losing 1–0 to France. Tedesco left the post in January 2025, with Rudi Garcia being appointed the new head coach with a contract through the end of the 2026 FIFA World Cup. Belgium reached the quarter-finals in the tournament, after beating Senegal 3–2 after extra time, and co-host nation, the United States, 4–1 in the knockout stage. They were eliminated by eventual winners Spain, 2–1.

== Team image ==
=== Kits ===
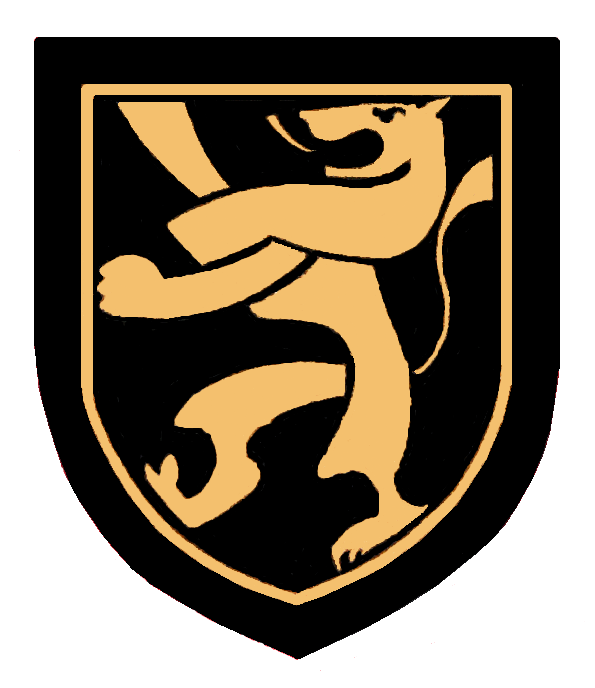
Former crests with stylised lion emblem (1948–80) and RFBA emblem (1980–2019)

In home matches, the team's outfield players traditionally wear the colours of the Belgian flag: black, yellow and red. Red dominates the strip and is often the sole jersey colour. The away colours are usually white, black or both; in 2014, the squad introduced a third, yellow kit. Their shirts are often trimmed with tricolores at the margins. Since 1981, the RBFA emblem has been the national team's badge; the previous badge was a yellow lion on a black shield, similar to the escutcheon of the national coat of arms. On 8 November 2019, the Royal Belgian Football Association revealed a new logo, which preserved the main elements of the previous one: the royal crown, the wreath and the Belgian tricolor.

For their first unofficial match in 1901, the Belgian team wore white jerseys with tricoloured bands on the upper arms. Around their third unofficial match in 1902, the choice was made for a "shirt with national colours ... [that would indicate,] with a stripe, the number of times every player has participated in an encounter". Since 1904, Belgium's classic all-red jersey design has been altered twice. In 1904–05, the squad briefly wore satin shirts with three horizontal bands in red, yellow and black; according to sports journalist Victor Boin, the shirts set "the ugliness record". During the 1970s, manager Raymond Goethals chose an all-white combination to improve the team's visibility during evening matches.

Six clothing manufacturers have supplied the official team strip. Adidas is the producer since 2014, and closed a sponsorship deal with the RBFA until 2026; it was also the supplier from 1974 to 1980, and from 1983 to 1991. Former kit manufacturers are Umbro (early 1970s), Admiral (1981–1982), (Note: Belgium played in an Adidas outfit in their last match of 1980, against Cyprus on 21 December. This suggests that Admiral's sponsorship started in 1981, contrary to what the 2014 article stated.) Diadora (1992–1998), Nike (1999–2009) and Burrda (2010–2014). (Note: The timeline in the 2015 overview article stated the switch from Diadora to Nike happened in 1998. However, the 1999 article focused on this kit sponsor change which took place in mid-1999.)

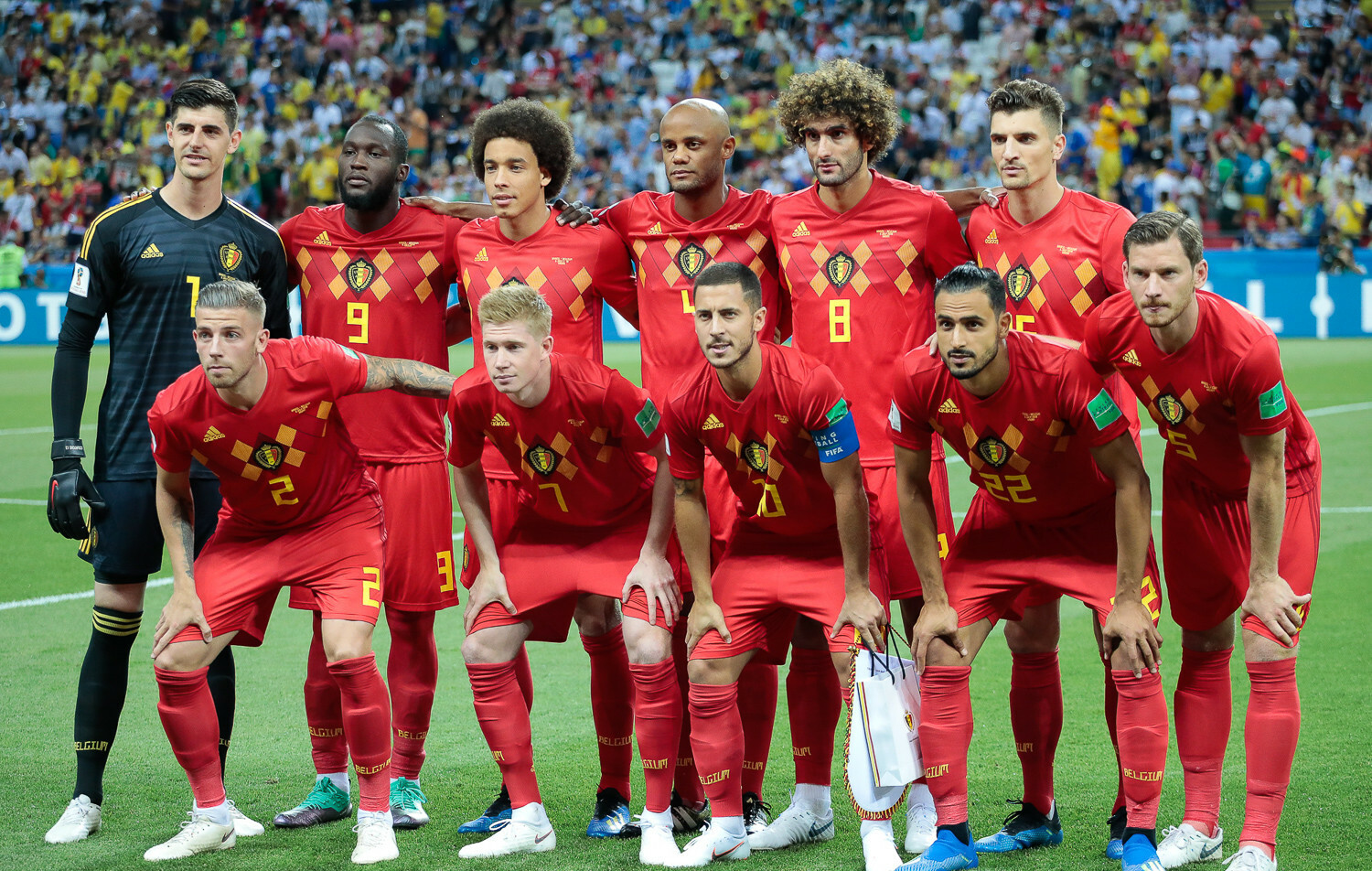
Traditional red home jersey during the 2018 World Cup where the team finished third

Kit supplier	Period
(England) Umbro	Early 1970s
(West Germany) Adidas	1974–1980
(England) Admiral	1981–1982
(Germany) Adidas	1983–1991
(Italy) Diadora	1992–1998
(United States) Nike	1999–2009
(Switzerland) Burrda	2010–2014
(Germany) Adidas	2015–present

=== Media coverage ===
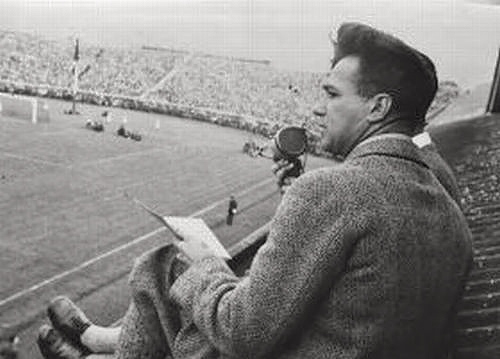
Gust De Muynck's live coverage during Belgium–Netherlands in 1931

The first live coverage of a Belgian sporting event occurred on 3 May 1931, when journalist Gust De Muynck commentated on the football match between Belgium and the Netherlands on radio. Later, football broadcasts were also televised. As 60 per cent of Belgians speak Dutch and 40 per cent speak French, commentaries for the national team matches are provided in both languages. The matches are not broadcast in German—Belgium's third official language. During Belgium's tournament appearances in the 1980s and the early 1990s, Rik De Saedeleer crowned himself the nation's most famous football commentator with his emotional and humorous reports.

Initially the matches were transmitted mainly on public television channels: the former BRTN (now VRT) in Dutch, and the RTBF in French. Since 1994, commercial channels such as vtm and its sister channel Kanaal 2, and VIER in Flanders, have purchased broadcasting rights. The Euro 2016 round of 16 match against Hungary was the most-watched programme in Belgian television history, with an audience of over 4 million viewers out of 11.3 million Belgians.

In April 2014, the VRT started transmitting a nine-piece, behind-the-scenes documentary about the national team filmed during the 2014 World Cup qualifiers, titled Iedereen Duivel (Everybody Devil). Cable broadband provider Telenet broadcast an eight-part documentary about individual players titled Rode Helden (Red Heroes).

=== Side activities ===
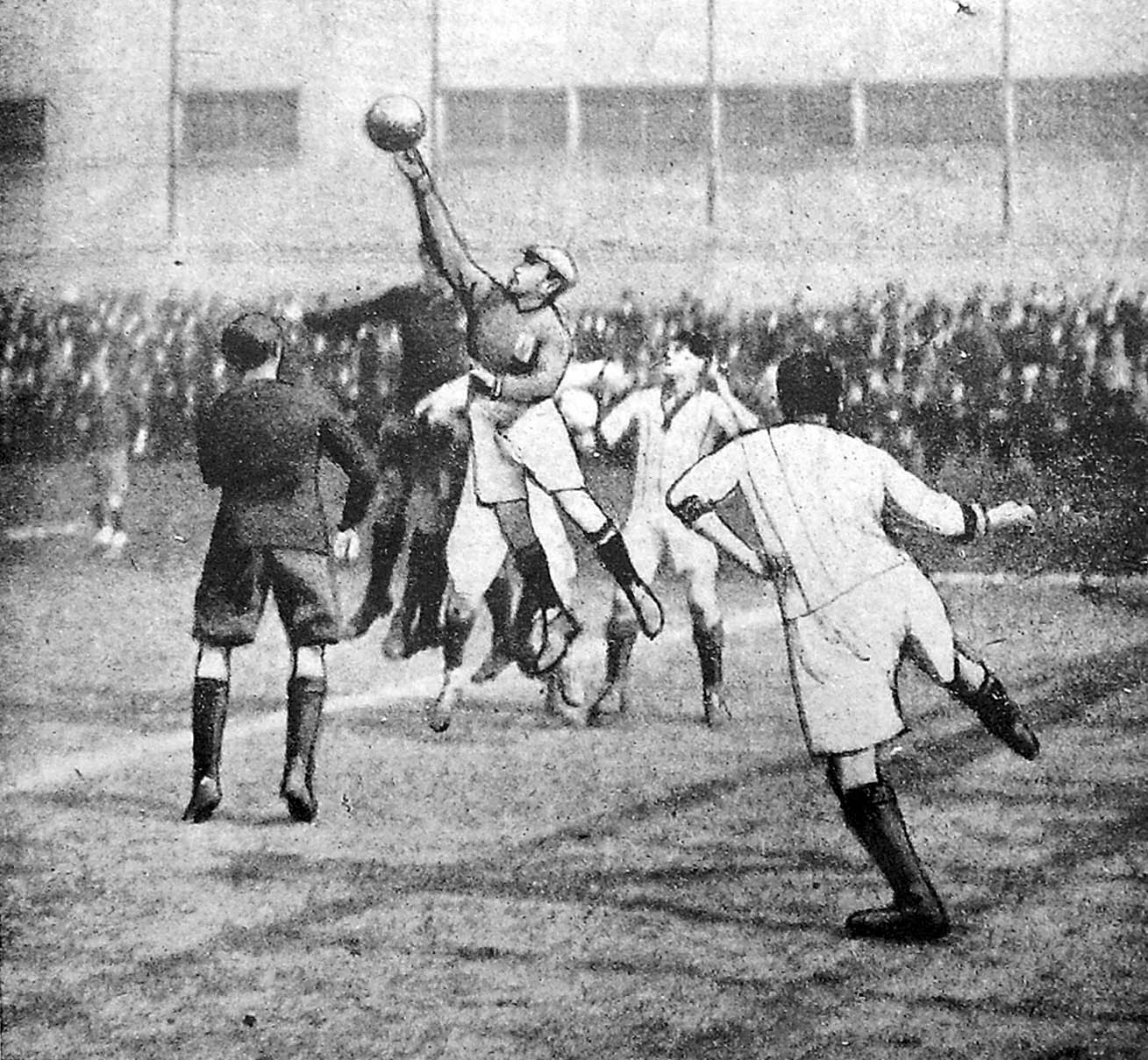
Illustration of Belgium's game against France in April 1918: some of such unofficial wartime matches served as charity fundraisers

Multiple events were organised for the fans during the squad's peak popularity in the 2010s. During the 2014 World Cup qualifiers, a string of interactive events called the Devil Challenges were organised. The premise was that small groups of international players would do a favour in return for each of the five comprehensive chores their supporters completed ("colour Belgium red", "gather 500,000 decibels", etc.), all of which were accomplished. In June 2013, the Belgian national team's first ever Fan Day attracted over 20,000 supporters; a second was held after the 2014 World Cup. On the days of Belgium's 2014 World Cup group matches, large dance events titled Dance with the Devils took place in three Belgian cities. This activity was repeated during Belgium's Euro 2016 group matches.

Occasionally, the Belgian team directly supported charity. Between 1914 and 1941 they played at least five unofficial matches of which the returns were for charitable purposes: two against France, and three against the Netherlands. In 1986, when the Belgian delegation reached the World Cup semi-finals, the squad started a project titled Casa Hogar, an idea of delegation leader Michel D'Hooghe. Casa Hogar is a home for street children in the Mexican industrial city of Toluca, to which the footballers donated part of their tournament bonuses. In August 2013, the national team supported four social projects through the charity fund Football+ Foundation, by playing an A-match with a plus sign on the shoulders of their jerseys and auctioning the shirts.

In the 21st century, several national team players acted up against discrimination. In 2002, the national squad held its first anti-racism campaign in which they posed with slogans. A home Euro 2012 qualifier was given the theme of respect for diversity in 2010; this UEFA-supported action was part of the European FARE Action Week. Ex-Red Devil Dimitri Mbuyu—the first black Belgium player (in 1987)—was engaged as godfather, and other foreign, current, and former footballers who played in the Belgian top division participated. In 2018, four national team players spoke up against homophobic violence, in a video clip made by organisation Kick It Out.

=== Nickname, logo and mascot ===
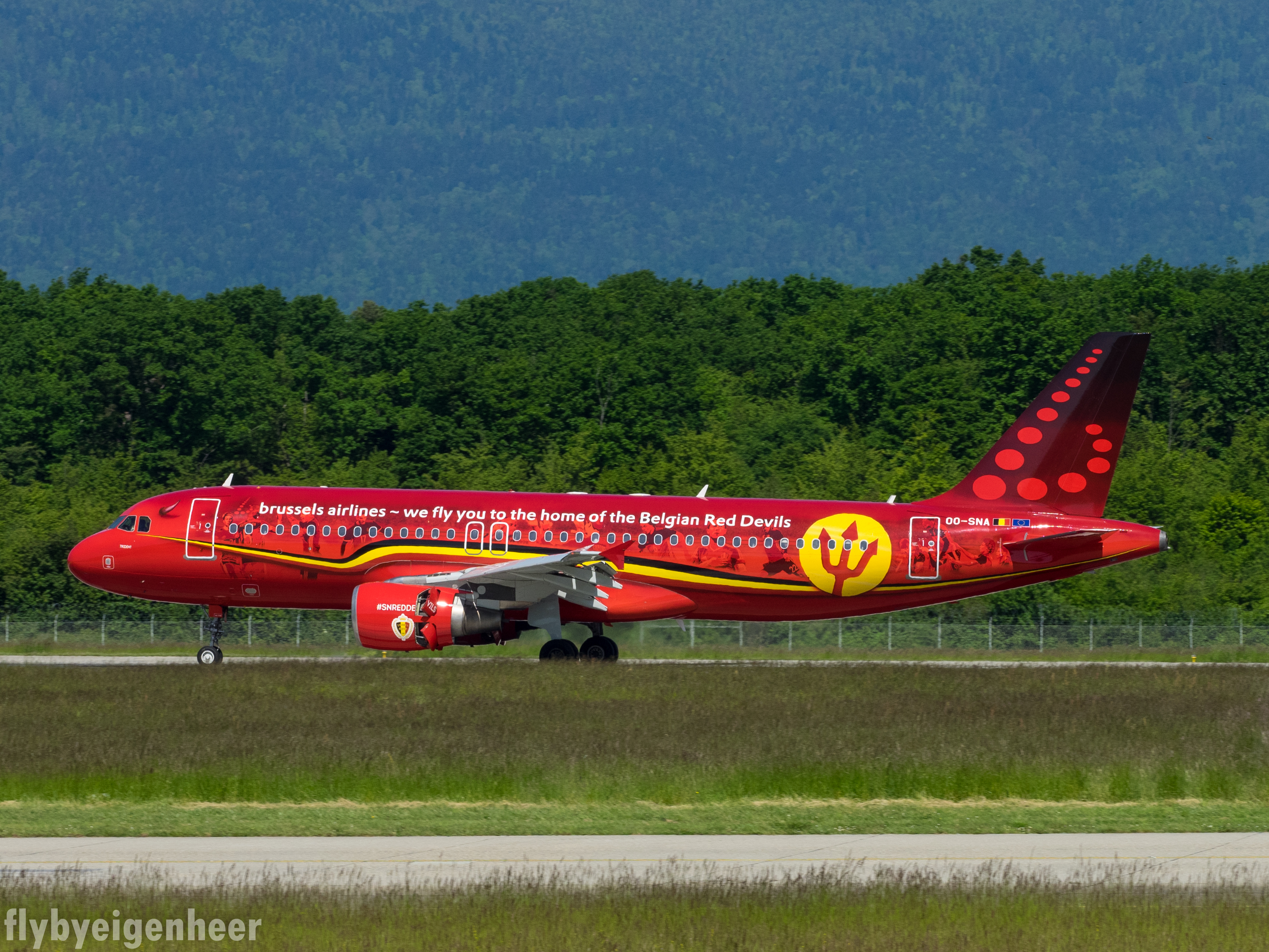
"Belgian Red Devils" airbus with trident logo, pictured in 2016

After a 1905 match, a Dutch reporter wrote that three Belgian footballers "work[ed] as devils". A year later Léopold FC manager Pierre Walckiers nicknamed the players Red Devils, inspired by their jersey colour, and the achievement of three successive victories in 1906. Because of their white home shirts in the 1970s, they were temporarily known as the White Devils. Since 2012, the team logo is a red trident (or three-pronged pitchfork), an item that is often associated with the devil. Apart from that, the national squad has also had four official anthropomorphous mascots. The first was a lion in team kit named Diabolix, a reference to the central symbol in the Belgian coat of arms that appeared on the team jerseys from 1905 to 1980. In accordance with their epithet, the next mascots were a red super-devil and two fan-made modern devils; the one introduced in 2018 was named "Red". A trident logo, referring to a devil, is also used frequently.

=== Supporters ===
"Cycling is the traditional national sport of Belgium, but soccer is the most popular."

— Historian Richard Henshaw, 1979

Fans of the Belgian national team display the country's tricolour national flag, usually with an emphasis on the red element. In 2012, local supporter clubs merged into one large Belgian federation named "1895" after the foundation year of the RBFA. One year later, 1895 had 24,000 members. The nationwide interest in the national team has also been reflected by the occasional presence of Belgian monarchs at their matches since 1914. One of the greatest moments for the Belgian team and their 12th man was in 1986 when the Belgian delegation at the World Cup received a warm "welcome home". When the World Cup semi-finalists appeared on the balcony of Brussels Town Hall, the adjoining Grand Place square was filled with an ecstatic crowd that cheered as though their squad had won a major tournament.

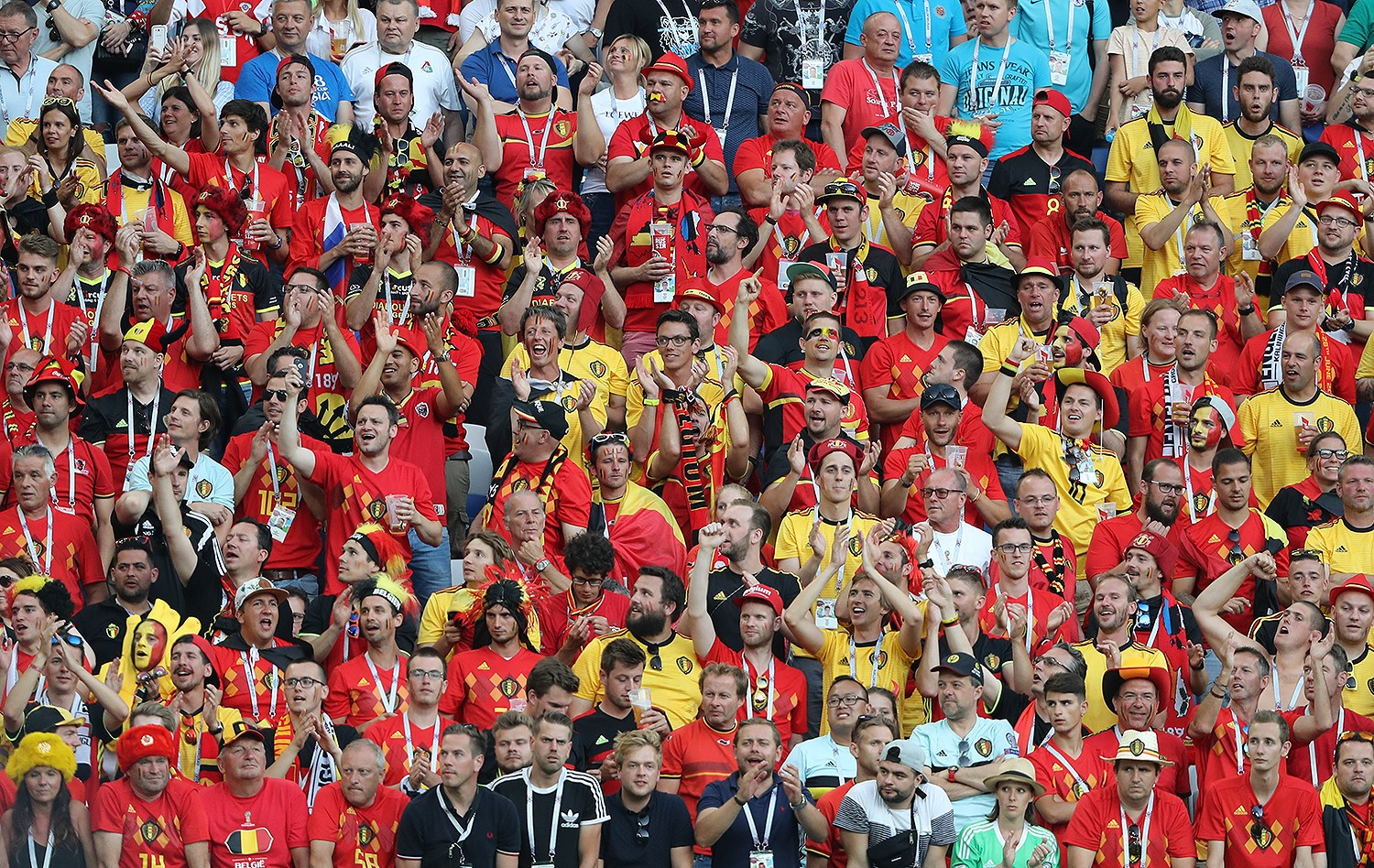
Crowd of Belgian fans in Kaliningrad Stadium at the 2018 World Cup

The team's deterioration after the 2002 World Cup led to their absence from the end stages of the next five major tournaments, and strained their popularity. Between 2004 and 2010, local journalists called the Belgian footballing nation "mortally ill". Of the fans that kept supporting their squad in bad times, Ludo Rollenberg was one of the most loyal. He attended the team's matches worldwide since 1990, missing only the 1999 Japanese Kirin Cup and two other matches by 2006, and was the only supporter to attend their matches in Armenia in 2009.

Just before the kick-off of a 2014 World Cup home qualifier, Belgium's footballers saw a tifo banner, sized 10.5 by 11.5 metres (34 by 38 ft) depicting a devil in the national colours. The presence of many Belgian players in top leagues abroad, such as the Premier League, and promising results under Marc Wilmots, increased fans' enthusiasm and belief in a successful World Cup campaign. Because of this popularity, two Belgian monuments were decorated in national colours for the 2014 FIFA World Cup; the Manneken Pis statue received a child-sized version of the new Belgian uniform, and facets of the Atomium's upper sphere were covered in black, yellow and red vinyl.

=== Rivalries ===
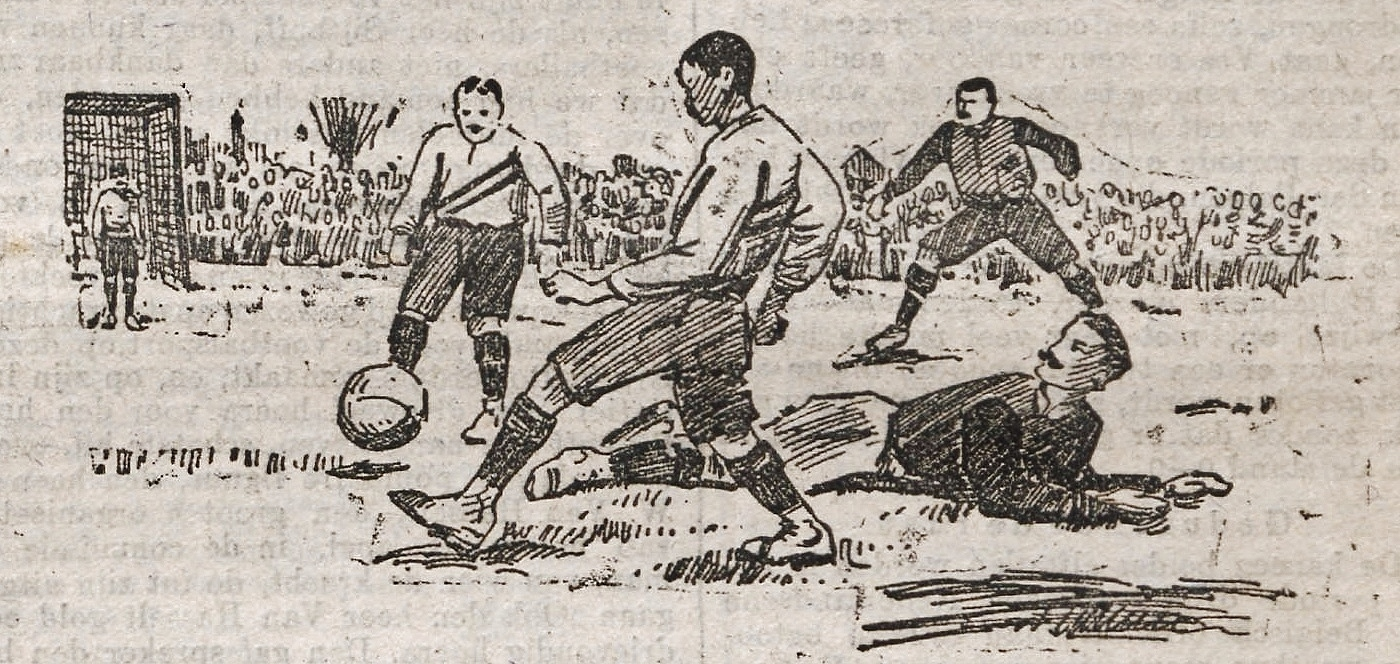
Illustration of a Netherlands–Belgium cup match at Rotterdam's Schuttersveld pitch in 1905

Belgium's main football rivals are its neighbors the Netherlands and France, with which it shares close cultural and political relations.

==== Netherlands ====
The matchup between the Belgian and Dutch team is known as the Low Countries derby, as of September 2025 they have played each other in 129 official matches. Belgium won the first four—unofficial—matches against the Netherlands, but lost their first FIFA-recognised contest. The two national teams played each other biannually between 1905 and 1964, except during the World Wars. They have met 18 times in major tournaments, and have played at least 35 friendly cup matches: in Belgium for the Coupe Vanden Abeele, and in the Netherlands for the Rotterdamsch Nieuwsblad-Beker. The overall balance favours the Netherlands, with 57 wins against 41 Belgian victories. The Low Countries' squads co-operated in fundraising initiatives between 1925 and 1941; they played seven unofficial matches for charity, FIFA and the Belgian Olympic Committee.

==== France ====
The clash between Belgium and France is nicknamed le Match Sympathique in French ("the Friendly Match"); they have contested 78 official matches as of September 2025. The first match between Belgium and France, the Évence Coppée Trophy played in 1904, was the first official match for both teams and the first official football match between independent countries on the European continent. Belgium maintained the better record with most wins over the succeeding 100 years, but since 2018 the gap has closed with 5 successive losses to France.

== Stadium ==
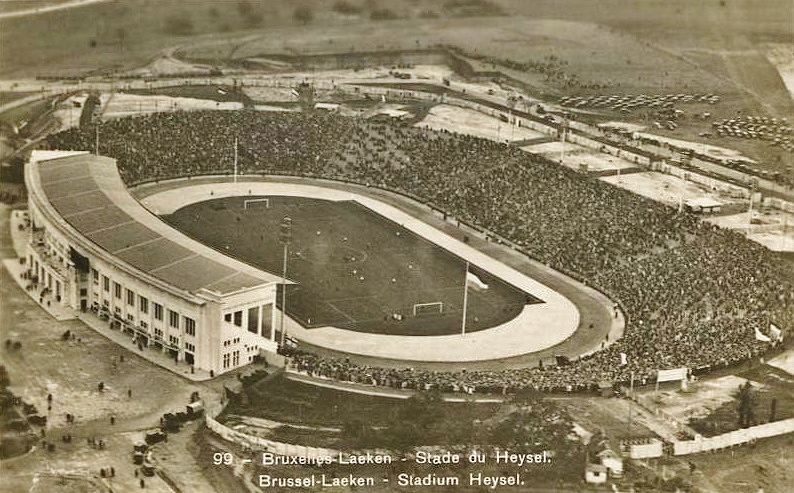
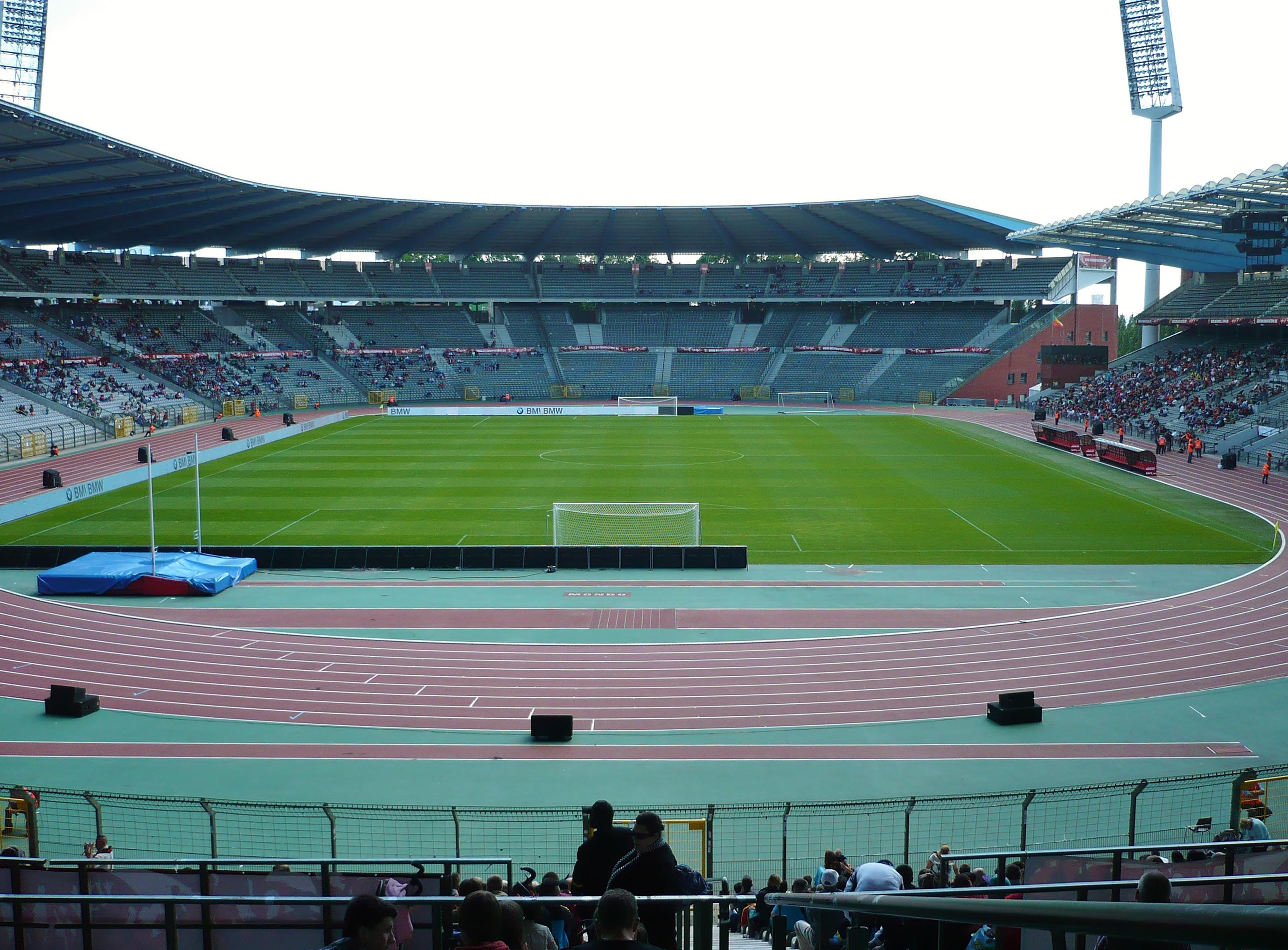
The Jubilee Stadium on the Heysel/Heizel Plateau in 1935 (left) and the King Baudouin Stadium in 2013 (right)

Numerous former and current venues in 11 urban areas have hosted Belgium's home matches. Most of these matches have been played in Brussels on the Heysel/Heizel Plateau, on the site of the present-day King Baudouin Stadium—a multipurpose facility with a seating capacity of 50,122. Its field also hosts the team's final trainings before domestic matches. Since 2007, most physical preparation takes place at the National Football Centre in Tubize, or at Anderlecht's training ground in the Neerpede quarter. Apart from Belgian home friendlies, at the international level Belgium's national stadium has also hosted six European Championship matches.

In 1930, for the country's centennial, the venue was inaugurated as the Jubilee Stadium with an unofficial match between Belgium and the Netherlands. At that time, the stadium had a capacity of 75,000. In 1946, it was renamed Heysel Stadium after its city quarter. This new name became associated with the tragedy preceding the 1985 European Cup final between Juventus and Liverpool; 39 spectators died after riots in the then antiquated building. Three years after the disaster, plans were unveiled for a renovation; in 1995, after two years of work, the modernised stadium was named after the late King Baudouin. In May 2013, the Brussels-Capital Region announced that the King Baudouin Stadium would be replaced by Eurostadium, elsewhere on the Heysel Plateau; in 2018, however, the plans for the new stadium were cancelled definitively.

== Results and fixtures ==
As of 15 November 2026, the complete official match record of the Belgian national team comprises 874 matches: 390 wins, 184 draws and 300 losses. During these matches, the team scored 1,588 times and conceded 1,343 goals. Belgium's highest winning margin is nine goals, which has been achieved on four occasions: against Zambia in 1994 (9–0), twice against San Marino in 2001 (10–1) and 2019 (9–0), and against Gibraltar in 2017 (9–0). Their longest winning streak is 12 wins, and their highest unbeaten record is 23 consecutive official matches. (Note: This streak started in September 2016 and does not include the friendly win against Czech Republic on 5 June 2017; this match is not FIFA-recognised since the Belgian and Czech football federations were too late in asking that it would be official.)

The following is a list of match results in the last twelve months, as well as any future matches that have been scheduled.

Win Draw Loss Fixture

=== 2026 ===
28 March 2026 Friendly	United States	2–5	Belgium	Atlanta, United States
15:30 (UTC−4)	McKennie 39'; Agyemang 87'	Report	Debast 45'; Onana 53'; De Ketelaere 59' (pen.); Lukébakio 68', 82'	Stadium: Mercedes-Benz Stadium; Attendance: 66,867; Referee: Esteban Ostojich (Uruguay)

31 March 2026 Friendly	Mexico	1–1	Belgium	Chicago, United States
20:00 (UTC−5)	J. Sánchez 19'	Report	Lukébakio 47'	Stadium: Soldier Field; Attendance: 52,412; Referee: Rosendo Mendoza (United States)

2 June 2026 Friendly	Croatia	0–2	Belgium	Rijeka, Croatia
18:00		Report	Tielemans 38'; Lukaku 90+6'	Stadium: Stadion Rujevica; Attendance: 7,555; Referee: Rade Obrenović (Slovenia)

6 June 2026 Friendly	Belgium	5–0	Tunisia	Brussels, Belgium
15:00	Trossard 28'; De Ketelaere 53'; De Bruyne 65'; Lukébakio 85'; Raskin 87'	Report		Stadium: King Baudouin Stadium; Attendance: 40,236; Referee: Anastasios Sidiropoulos (Greece)

15 June 2026 2026 FIFA World Cup Group G	Belgium	1–1	Egypt	Seattle, United States
12:00 (UTC−7)	Hany 66' (o.g.)	Report	Ashour 19'	Stadium: Lumen Field; Attendance: 66,775; Referee: Ramon Abatti (Brazil)

21 June 2026 2026 FIFA World Cup Group G	Belgium	0–0	Iran	Inglewood, United States
12:00 (UTC−7)		Report		Stadium: SoFi Stadium; Attendance: 70,317; Referee: Darío Herrera (Argentina)

26 June 2026 2026 FIFA World Cup Group G	New Zealand	1–5	Belgium	Vancouver, Canada
20:00 (UTC−7)	Just 84'	Report	Trossard 28', 50'; De Bruyne 66'; Lukaku 86'; Saelemaekers 90+4'	Stadium: BC Place; Attendance: 52,497; Referee: Adham Makhadmeh (Jordan)

1 July 2026 2026 FIFA World Cup Round of 32	Belgium	3–2 (a.e.t.)	Senegal	Seattle, United States
13:00 (UTC−7)	Lukaku 86'; Tielemans 89', 120+5' (pen.)	Report	Diarra 25'; I. Sarr 51'	Stadium: Lumen Field; Attendance: 66,925; Referee: Saíd Martínez (Honduras)

6 July 2026 2026 FIFA World Cup Round of 16	United States	1–4	Belgium	Seattle, United States
17:00 (UTC−7)	Tillman 31'	Report	De Ketelaere 9', 33'; Vanaken 57'; Lukaku 90+3'	Stadium: Lumen Field; Attendance: 66,925; Referee: Adham Makhadmeh (Jordan)

10 July 2026 2026 FIFA World Cup Quarter-finals	Spain	2–1	Belgium	Inglewood, United States
12:00 (UTC−7)	Fabián 30'; Merino 88'	Report	De Ketelaere 41'	Stadium: SoFi Stadium; Attendance: 70,492; Referee: Michael Oliver (England)

25 September 2026 2026–27 UEFA Nations League A	Italy	0–2	Belgium	Rome, Italy
20:45		Report	Godts 20'; Lukébakio 69'	Stadium: Stadio Olimpico; Attendance: 47,155; Referee: Daniel Siebert (Germany)

28 September 2026 2026–27 UEFA Nations League A	Belgium	0–1	France	Brussels, Belgium
20:45		Report	Olise 88'	Stadium: King Baudouin Stadium; Attendance: 40,857; Referee: Rade Obrenović (Slovenia)

2 October 2026 2026–27 UEFA Nations League A	Belgium	3–0	Turkey	Liège, Belgium
20:45	De Bruyne 10', 60'; Lukaku 76'	Report		Stadium: Stade Maurice Dufrasne; Attendance: 24,386; Referee: Rohit Saggi (Norway)

5 October 2026 2026–27 UEFA Nations League A	France	4–1	Belgium	Saint-Denis, France
20:45	Doué 77'; Cherki 81'; Olise 88', 90+1'	Report	Lukébakio 35'	Stadium: Stade de France; Attendance: 75,389; Referee: Nick Walsh (Scotland)

12 November 2026 2026–27 UEFA Nations League A	Turkey	1–2	Belgium	İzmir, Turkey
18:00	Güler 20'	Report	De Bruyne 27'; De Ketelaere 30'	Stadium: Gürsel Aksel Stadium; Attendance: 19,697; Referee: Sandro Schärer (Switzerland)

15 November 2026 2026–27 UEFA Nations League A	Belgium	4–1	Italy	Brussels, Belgium
20:45	De Cuyper 15'; Ngoy 22'; Doku 26'; Moreira 80'	Report	P. Esposito 11'	Stadium: King Baudouin Stadium; Attendance: 42,842; Referee: Espen Eskås (Norway)

=== 2027 ===
25–27 March 2027 2026–27 UEFA Nations League quarter-finals	Belgium	v	Germany

28–30 March 2027 2026–27 UEFA Nations League quarter-finals	Germany	v	Belgium

== Coaching staff ==
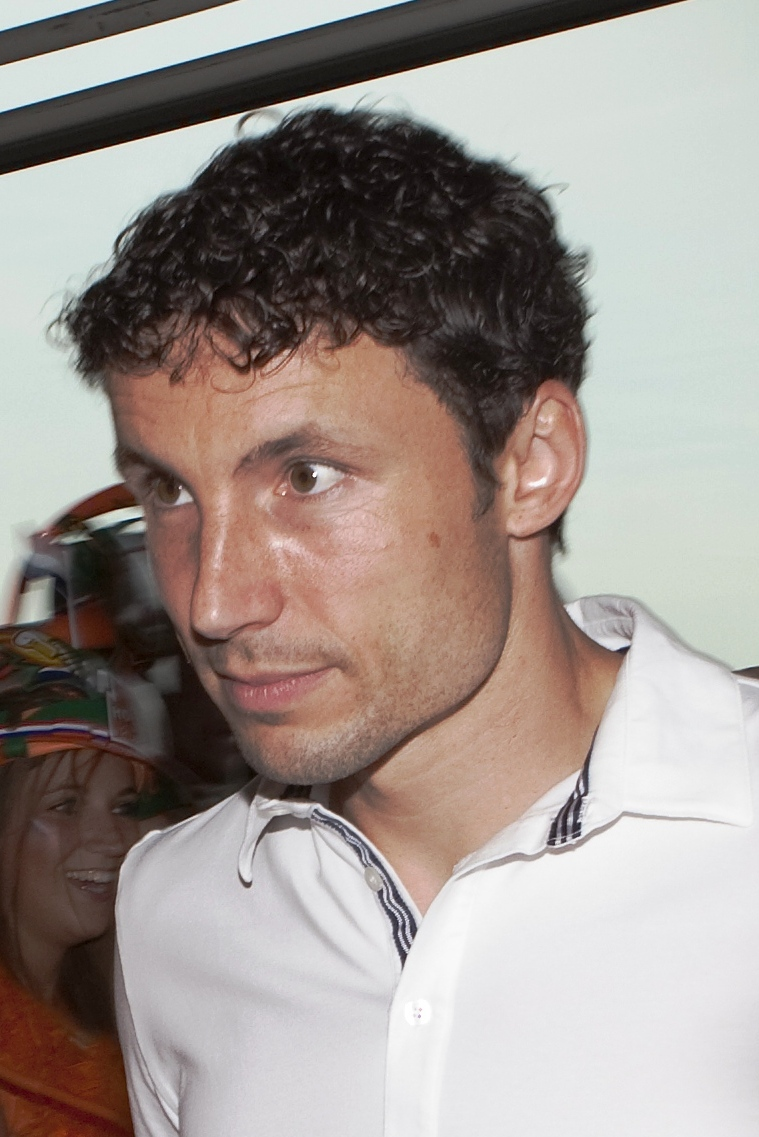
Current head coach Mark van Bommel

Position	Name
Head coach	(Netherlands) Mark van Bommel
Assistant coaches	(Netherlands) Boudewijn Zenden (Netherlands) Reinier Robbemond (Belgium) Maarten Martens
Goalkeeping coach	(Belgium) Guy Martens
Physical coaches	(Belgium) Bram Gielen (Belgium) Charle Jaspers
Analysts	(Belgium) Dylan Vanhaeren (Netherlands) Alex Abresch
Sports Scientist	(Belgium) Arne Jaspers
Physiotherapists	(France) Yannick Dyduch (Belgium) James van Gemert (Belgium) Sander Nuyens
Team doctors	(Belgium) Brahim Hacene (Belgium) Brecht De Coninck

=== Coaching history ===
Since 1904, the RBFA, 26 permanent managers and two caretaker managers have officially been in charge of the national team; (Note: The interim managers were Louis Nicolay and Franky Vercauteren.) this includes one national footballer selector. As of January 2025, a crew of over 30 RBFA employees guides the player group, including French head coach Rudi Garcia, and assistant coaches Andreas Hinkel and Luke Benstead. Under Marc Wilmots, Belgium reached the top FIFA ranking spot in 2015, which earned him the title of Best Coach of the Year at the 2015 Globe Soccer Awards. Guy Thys received World Soccer magazine's Manager of the Year in 1986 after results at the World Cup and Euros. Under Spanish coach Roberto Martínez, the team reached a best-ever third place finish at the 2018 FIFA World Cup.

Rather than developing innovative team formations or styles of play, Belgium's managers applied conventional tactics. At the three World Cups in the 1930s, the Red Devils were aligned in a contemporary 2–3–5 "pyramid". In 1954, Doug Livingstone's squad played in a 3–2–5 "WM" arrangement during World Cup matches. Throughout most of their tournament matches in the 1970s, 1980s and 1990s, the team played in a 4–4–2 formation. Since Raymond Goethals' stint in the 1970s, a key strength of the Belgian squad has been their systematic use of the offside trap, a defensive tactic that was already intensively applied in the 1960s by Anderlecht coach Pierre Sinibaldi. According to football journalist Wim De Bock, "master tactician" Goethals represented the "conservative, defensive football of the Belgian national team"; he added that in the 1970s, the contrast between the Belgian playing style and the Netherlands' Total Football "could not be bigger".

At the 1998 World Cup, Georges Leekens chose a 4–3–3 arrangement for Belgium's second and third group matches. Robert Waseige said that "above all, [his] 4–4–2 system [was] holy", in the sense that he left good attackers on the bench to keep his favourite formation. Wilmots opted for the 4–3–3 line-up again, with the intention of showing dominant football against any country.

== Players ==
=== Current squad ===
The following players were selected for the UEFA Nations League matches against Turkey and Italy on 12 and 15 November 2026, respectively.

Information correct as of 15 November 2026, after the match against Italy.

No.	Pos.	Player	Date of birth (age)	Caps	Goals	Club
1	GK	Senne Lammens	7 July 2002 (age 24)	8	0	(The Football Association) Manchester United
12	GK	Maarten Vandevoordt	26 February 2002 (age 24)	1	0	(German Football Association) RB Leipzig
13	GK	Mike Penders	31 July 2005 (age 21)	0	0	(The Football Association) Chelsea
	GK	Jari De Busser	21 October 1999 (age 27)	0	0	(Royal Dutch Football Association) AZ
2	DF	Kyriani Sabbe	26 January 2005 (age 21)	0	0	(Royal Belgian Football Association) Club Brugge
3	DF	Arthur Theate	25 May 2000 (age 26)	37	1	(Italian Football Federation) Bologna
4	DF	Brandon Mechele	28 January 1993 (age 33)	21	1	(Royal Belgian Football Association) Club Brugge
5	DF	Maxim De Cuyper	22 December 2000 (age 25)	30	5	(The Football Association) Brighton & Hove Albion
15	DF	Nathan Ngoy	10 June 2003 (age 23)	14	1	(French Football Federation) Lille
18	DF	Joaquin Seys	28 March 2005 (age 21)	8	0	(Royal Belgian Football Association) Club Brugge
21	DF	Timothy Castagne	5 December 1995 (age 30)	75	2	(The Football Association) Fulham
	DF	Josue Kongolo	13 April 2006 (age 20)	0	0	(Royal Belgian Football Association) Genk
6	MF	Roméo Lavia	6 January 2004 (age 22)	6	0	(The Football Association) Chelsea
7	MF	Kevin De Bruyne (vice-captain)	28 June 1991 (age 35)	129	41	(Italian Football Federation) Napoli
8	MF	Youri Tielemans (captain)	7 May 1997 (age 29)	95	15	(The Football Association) Manchester United
20	MF	Hans Vanaken	24 August 1992 (age 34)	45	8	(Royal Belgian Football Association) Club Brugge
23	MF	Nicolas Raskin	23 February 2001 (age 25)	24	2	(Scottish Football Association) Rangers
	MF	Mandela Keita	10 May 2002 (age 24)	2	0	(Italian Football Federation) Parma
9	FW	Romelu Lukaku ^{RET}	13 May 1993 (age 33)	135	94	(Turkish Football Federation) Fenerbahçe
10	FW	Leandro Trossard	4 December 1994 (age 31)	61	14	(Turkish Football Federation) Beşiktaş
11	FW	Jérémy Doku	27 May 2002 (age 24)	50	8	(The Football Association) Manchester City
14	FW	Dodi Lukébakio	24 September 1997 (age 29)	39	8	(Portuguese Football Federation) Benfica
16	FW	Hugo Cuypers	7 February 1997 (age 29)	1	0	(Mexican Football Federation) Monterrey
17	FW	Charles De Ketelaere	10 March 2001 (age 25)	41	10	(Italian Football Federation) Atalanta
19	MF	Diego Moreira	6 August 2004 (age 22)	9	1	(Italian Football Federation) AC Milan
22	FW	Mika Godts	7 June 2005 (age 21)	8	1	(French Football Federation) Paris Saint-Germain

=== Recent call-ups ===
The following players have been called up to the national team in the past 12 months but are not part of the current squad.

Pos.	Player	Date of birth (age)	Caps	Goals	Club	Latest call-up
GK	Thibaut Courtois	11 May 1992 (age 34)	115	0	(Spain) Real Madrid	2026 FIFA World Cup
GK	Matz Sels ^{RET}	26 February 1992 (age 34)	13	0	(England) Nottingham Forest	v. Mexico, 31 March 2026
DF	Zeno Debast	24 October 2003 (age 23)	26	1	(Portugal) Sporting CP	v. France, 5 October 2026
DF	Koni De Winter	12 June 2002 (age 24)	8	0	(Italy) AC Milan	v. France, 5 October 2026
DF	Thomas Meunier	12 September 1991 (age 35)	83	10	(England) Sunderland	2026 FIFA World Cup
MF	Axel Witsel ^{RET}	12 January 1989 (age 37)	140	12	(France) Nice	2026 FIFA World Cup
MF	Amadou Onana	16 August 2001 (age 25)	33	1	(England) Aston Villa	2026 FIFA World Cup
MF	Nathan De Cat	19 July 2008 (age 18)	1	0	(Germany) TSG Hoffenheim	v. Mexico, 31 March 2026
FW	Loïs Openda	16 February 2000 (age 26)	35	3	(France) Lyon	v. France, 5 October 2026
FW	Matias Fernandez-Pardo	3 February 2005 (age 21)	7	0	(England) Newcastle United	v. France, 5 October 2026
FW	Malick Fofana	31 March 2005 (age 21)	6	1	(England) Sunderland	v. France, 5 October 2026
FW	Alexis Saelemaekers	27 June 1999 (age 27)	28	3	(Italy) AC Milan	2026 FIFA World Cup
FW	Lucas Stassin	29 November 2004 (age 21)	1	0	(Spain) Sevilla	v. Mexico, 31 March 2026
^{PRE} Preliminary squad / standby; ^{RET} Retired from the national team; ^{INJ} Player injuries; ^{ILL} Player illness; ^{U21} Moved to U21 squad; ^{WD} Player withdrew from squad due to non-injury issue

=== Notable ===
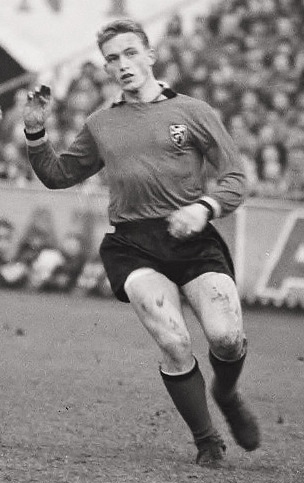
Paul Van Himst in 1964

In the team's first decade, striker Robert De Veen scored 26 goals in 23 international appearances. Richard Henshaw described Alphonse Six as "Belgium's greatest player in the prewar period ... [who] was often called the most skillful forward outside Great Britain". The key player of the victorious 1920 Olympic squad was Robert Coppée, who scored a hat-trick against Spain's Ricardo Zamora, and the penalty in the final. Other Belgian strikers in the interwar period were former top scorer Bernard Voorhoof and "Belgium's football grandmaster" Raymond Braine, considered "one of the greatest players of the era".

Other players in the 1940s and 1950s included centre-back Louis Carré and attackers Jef Mermans, Pol Anoul and Rik Coppens; at the 1954 World Cup, Anoul shone with three goals, and newspaper L'Équipe named Coppens the event's best centre forward. The 1960s and the early 1970s were the glory days of forward and four-time Belgian Golden Shoe Paul Van Himst, later elected Belgian UEFA Golden Player of 1954–2003 and Belgium's Player of the Century by IFFHS.

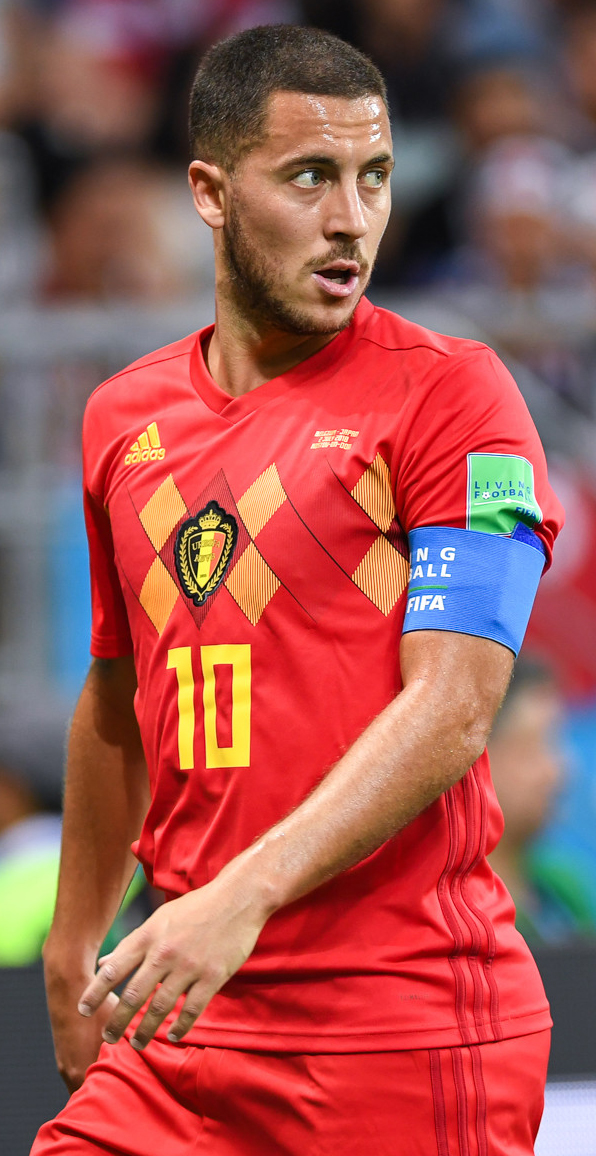
Eden Hazard, former team captain and third top scoring player for Belgium

At the 1965 Ballon d'Or, Van Himst ranked fourth, achieving Belgium's highest ever position at the European football election. Decades after Coppens and Van Himst had retired from playing football, a journalist on a Flemish television show asked them "Who [from both of you] was the best, actually?". Coppens replied: "I will ask Paul that ... If Paul says it was me, then he's right". In 1966, striker Raoul Lambert and defending midfielder Wilfried Van Moer joined the national team; while the UEFA praised Lambert for his skills at Euro 1972, Van Moer won three Golden Shoes and equalled Van Himst's fourth rank at the 1980 Ballon d'Or.

Belgium has seen two talented waves since 1980, from which several players in defensive positions gained international fame. In the 1980s and the early 1990s, goalkeepers Jean-Marie Pfaff and Michel Preud'homme were elected best custodians at the FIFA World Cup, while FIFA recognised midfielders Jan Ceulemans and Enzo Scifo as the propelling forces of Belgium's 1986 World Cup squad. In 2002, after all players of this generation had retired, Marc Wilmots became Belgium's top scorer at the World Cup with five goals.

During the 10 years from 2002 to 2012 in which Belgium failed to qualify for a major tournament, another golden generation emerged, many of whom gained both prime individual and team awards in top European clubs and competitions. (Note: Prime individual awards include being elected the season's or year's best player of a competition; prime team awards equal winning a competition. National top divisions, main national cup competitions, UEFA Champions League and UEFA Europa League are considered.) These include defender Jan Vertonghen, Belgium's most capped player of all time, defender Vincent Kompany, midfielder Kevin De Bruyne, one of the best attacking midfielders in the world and his generation; and winger Eden Hazard, who has been praised as one of Chelsea's greatest-ever players and one of his era's best footballers in the world. Hazard is ranked third after Romelu Lukaku and Kevin De Bruyne on Belgium's all-time scoring leaderboard. Honourable mentions of this golden generation are Thibaut Courtois, Dries Mertens, and Toby Alderweireld. These players helped Belgium finish at the third place at the 2018 FIFA World Cup, the team's best result at the tournament, and reach No. 1 on FIFA's rankings twice, since 2015.

== Individual statistics ==
=== Most appearances ===
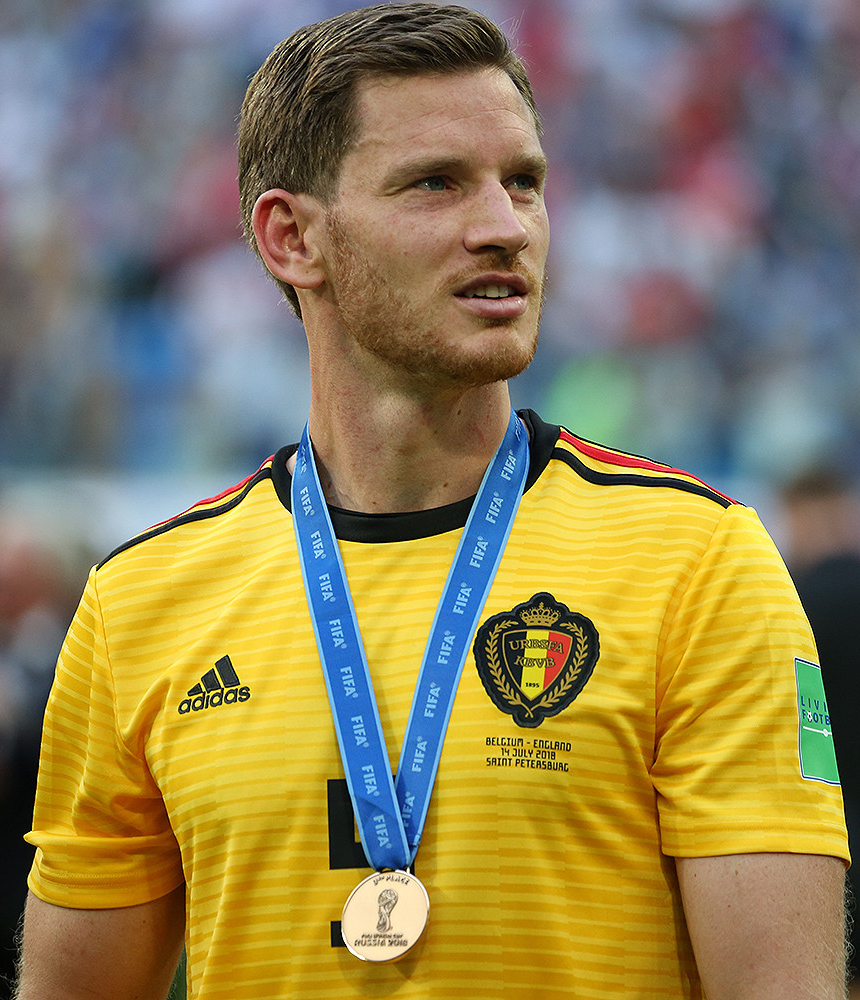
Jan Vertonghen is Belgium's most capped player with 157 appearances.

As of 15 November 2026, the RBFA lists 747 players who appeared on the men's senior national team. With 157 caps according to the RBFA, Jan Vertonghen has the most appearances for Belgium. Eden Hazard started the most matches as captain (59). Axel Witsel had the longest career as an international footballer, at 18 years, 3 months and 14 days.

As of 15 November 2026. The records are collected based on data from FIFA and RSSSF. Statistics include three matches that are unrecognised by FIFA. (Note: Note that the RBFA does not count caps earned in the Belgian seven Summer Olympics matches, and that it does include Belgium's friendlies on 14 November 2012, 26 May 2014 and 5 June 2017 that are FIFA-unrecognised.)

Players in bold are still active with Belgium.

Rank	Player	Caps	Goals	Position	Belgium career
1	Jan Vertonghen	157	10	DF	2007–2024
2	Axel Witsel	140	12	MF	2008–2026
3	Romelu Lukaku	135	94	FW	2010–2026
4	**Kevin De Bruyne**	129	41	MF	2010–present
5	Toby Alderweireld	127	5	DF	2009–2022
6	Eden Hazard	126	33	MF/FW	2008–2022
7	**Thibaut Courtois**	115	0	GK	2011–present
8	Dries Mertens	109	21	FW	2011–2022
9	Jan Ceulemans	96	23	MF/FW	1977–1991
10	**Youri Tielemans**	95	15	MF	2016–present

=== Top goalscorers ===
Romelu Lukaku is Belgium's top scorer with 94 goals.

Romelu Lukaku is the highest-scoring Belgium player with 94 goals. Those who scored the most goals in one match are Robert De Veen, Bert De Cleyn and Josip Weber with five; Lukaku holds the record for the most hat-tricks with four. Belgium's fastest goal after the initial kick-off was scored by Christian Benteke, 8.1 seconds into a match against Gibraltar on 10 October 2016.

As of 15 November 2026. The records are collected based on data from FIFA and RSSSF. Statistics include three matches that are unrecognised by FIFA. (Note: Note that the RBFA does not count caps earned in the Belgian seven Summer Olympics matches, and that it does include Belgium's friendlies on 14 November 2012, 26 May 2014 and 5 June 2017 that are not FIFA-recognised – the former two due to an excessive number of substitutions according to the Laws of the Game, the latter because of a lacking official request.)

Players in bold are still active with Belgium.

Rank	Player	Goals	Caps	Ratio	Belgium career
1	Romelu Lukaku (list)	94	135	0.7	2010–2026
2	**Kevin De Bruyne**	41	129	0.32	2010–present
3	Eden Hazard	33	126	0.26	2008–2022
4	Bernard Voorhoof	30	61	0.49	1928–1940
4	Paul Van Himst	30	81	0.37	1960–1974
6	Joseph Mermans	28	56	0.48	1945–1956
6	Marc Wilmots	28	70	0.4	1990–2002
8	Michy Batshuayi	27	55	0.49	2015–2024
9	Robert Deveen	26	23	1.13	1906–1913
9	Raymond Braine	26	54	0.48	1925–1939

== Competitive record ==
=== FIFA World Cup ===
United States–Belgium in 1930 was the joint first ever World Cup match

Belgium failed to progress past the first round in their first five World Cup participations. After two scoreless defeats at the inaugural World Cup in 1930, the team scored in their first round knockout matches in the 1934 and 1938 editions. In 1954, they drew with England 4–4 after extra time, and in 1970, they won their first World Cup match, against El Salvador (3–0).

From 1982 until 2002, Belgium qualified for six successive World Cups, advancing past the first round five times. In the 1982 FIFA World Cup opener, Belgium beat defending champions Argentina 1–0. Their tournament ended in the second group stage, after a Polish hat-trick by Zbigniew Boniek and a 0–1 loss against the Soviet Union.

At Mexico 1986, the Belgian team achieved their then best-ever World Cup run at the time. In the knockout phase as underdogs they beat the Soviet Union after extra time 4–3; the unnoticed offside position of Jan Ceulemans, during the initial ninety minutes, allowed him to equalise the match at 2–2 and enter extra time. They also beat Spain, in a penalty shoot-out after a 1–1 draw, but lost to eventual champions Argentina in the semi-finals 2–0, and France in the third-place match 4–2.

In 1990, Belgium dominated periods of their round of 16 match against England; Enzo Scifo and Jan Ceulemans hit the woodwork. David Platt's volley in the final minute of extra time, described as "nearly blind" by Richard Witzig, avoided an apparently goalless draw and led to the sudden elimination of the Belgians.

In 1994, a 3–2 defeat to defending champions Germany saw Belgium go out in the second round again. Afterwards, the entire Belgian delegation criticised referee Kurt Röthlisberger for not awarding a penalty for a foul on Belgian Josip Weber. Three draws in the group stage of the 1998 World Cup were insufficient for Belgium to reach the knockout stage. With two draws, the 2002 tournament started poorly for Belgium, but they won the decisive group match against Russia 3–2. In the second round, they faced eventual champions Brazil; Belgium lost 2–0 after Marc Wilmots' headed opening goal was disallowed due to a "phantom foul" on Roque Júnior, as Witzig named it.

In 2014, Belgium beat all their group opponents by only one goal, and played an entertaining round of 16 match against the United States, in which American goalkeeper Tim Howard made 15 saves. (Note: FIFA's initial match statistics showed 16 saves, and many news sources continue to use this number. The official FIFA statistics were updated on 5 July 2014 to show 15 saves.) However, they defeated the U.S. 2–1 in extra time. In a balanced quarter-finals, Argentina eliminated Belgium, with a 1–0 victory.

At the 2018 World Cup, Belgium started with five consecutive victories (including group wins over Panama, Tunisia and England). In the round of 16 match against Japan, Belgium were down 2–0, eventually turning the tide and winning 3–2 with goals from Jan Vertonghen and late substitutes Marouane Fellaini and Nacer Chadli. Belgium then defeated World Cup favourites Brazil 2–1 on the back of an early Fernandinho own goal and a goal by Kevin De Bruyne, and reached the semi-finals. Belgium lost to France 0–1 in the semi-finals, but rebounded to win 2–0 in their second victory over England in the tournament to secure third place and the best ever World Cup result for the Belgian national team.

FIFA World Cup record											Qualification record						
Year	Host(s)	Round	Position	Pld	W	D	L	GF	GA	Squad	Pos.	Pld	W	D	L	GF	GA
1930	Uruguay	Group stage	11th	2	0	0	2	0	4	Squad	Qualified as invitees						
1934	Italy	Round of 16	15th	1	0	0	1	2	5	Squad	2nd	2	0	1	1	6	8
1938	France	Round of 16	13th	1	0	0	1	1	3	Squad	2nd	2	1	1	0	4	3
1950	Brazil	Did not enter									Did not enter						
1954	Switzerland	Group stage	12th	2	0	1	1	5	8	Squad	1st	4	3	1	0	11	6
1958	Sweden	Did not qualify									2nd	4	2	1	1	16	11
1962	Chile	Did not qualify									3rd	4	0	0	4	3	10
1966	England	Did not qualify									Play-off	5	3	0	2	12	5
1970	Mexico	Group stage	10th	3	1	0	2	4	5	Squad	1st	6	4	1	1	14	8
1974	West Germany	Did not qualify									2nd	6	4	2	0	12	0
1978	Argentina	Did not qualify									2nd	6	3	0	3	7	6
1982	Spain	Second group stage	10th	5	2	1	2	3	5	Squad	1st	8	5	1	2	12	9
1986	Mexico	Fourth place	4th	7	2	2	3	12	15	Squad	Play-off	8	4	2	2	9	5
1990	Italy	Round of 16	11th	4	2	0	2	6	4	Squad	1st	8	4	4	0	15	5
1994	United States	Round of 16	11th	4	2	0	2	4	4	Squad	2nd	10	7	1	2	16	5
1998	France	Group stage	19th	3	0	3	0	3	3	Squad	Play-off	10	7	1	2	23	13
2002	South Korea; Japan	Round of 16	14th	4	1	2	1	6	7	Squad	Play-off	10	7	2	1	27	6
2006	Germany	Did not qualify									4th	10	3	3	4	16	11
2010	South Africa	Did not qualify									4th	10	3	1	6	13	20
2014	Brazil	Quarter-finals	6th	5	4	0	1	6	3	Squad	1st	10	8	2	0	18	4
2018	Russia	Third place	3rd	7	6	0	1	16	6	Squad	1st	10	9	1	0	43	6
2022	Qatar	Group stage	23rd	3	1	1	1	1	2	Squad	1st	8	6	2	0	25	6
2026	Canada; Mexico; United States	Quarter-finals	6th	6	3	2	1	14	7	Squad	1st	8	5	3	0	29	7
2030 (Note: Additional matches are scheduled to be played in Argentina, Paraguay, and Uruguay in commemoration of the 100th anniversary of the first World Cup, however they are not considered to be official hosts of the tournament.)	Spain; Portugal; Morocco	To be determined									To be determined						
2034	Saudi Arabia	To be determined									To be determined						
Total		Third place	15/23	57	24	12	21	83	81	—	15/23	149	88	30	31	331	154
Champions Runners-up Third place

=== UEFA European Championship ===
Line-ups of the Euro 1980 final: Belgium (red) against West Germany

Belgium have qualified for the UEFA European Championship seven times, and has hosted or co-hosted the event twice; they were chosen to accommodate 1972 (Note: The other bids were from England and Italy,) and 2000, co-hosting the latter with the Netherlands.

At Euro 1972, Belgium finished third after losing 1–2 against West Germany and beating Hungary 2–1. The team's best continental result is runners-up at Euro 1980 in Italy, losing to West Germany. West Germany's Horst Hrubesch scored first, but René Vandereycken equalised courtesy of a penalty. Two minutes before the regular playing time ended, Hrubesch scored again denying Belgium a first European title.

At Euro 1984, in their last and decisive group match against Denmark, the Belgian team took a 0–2 lead, but the Danes won the match 3–2. Sixteen years later, Belgium reappeared at the Euros as co-hosts, qualifying automatically, but the Belgians were eliminated in the group stage.

Belgium exited in the quarter-finals of UEFA Euro 2016, losing to Wales.

UEFA European Championship record											Qualification record						
Year	Host(s)	Round	Position	Pld	W	D	L	GF	GA	Squad	Pos.	Pld	W	D	L	GF	GA
1960	France	Did not enter									Did not enter						
1964	Spain	Did not qualify									Preliminary round	2	0	0	2	2	4
1968	Italy	Did not qualify									2nd	6	3	1	2	14	9
1972	Belgium	Third place	3rd	2	1	0	1	3	3	Squad	Quarter-finals	8	5	2	1	13	4
1976	Yugoslavia	Did not qualify									Quarter-finals	8	3	2	3	7	10
1980	Italy	Runners-up	2nd	4	1	2	1	4	4	Squad	1st	8	4	4	0	12	5
1984	France	Group stage	6th	3	1	0	2	4	8	Squad	1st	6	4	1	1	12	8
1988	West Germany	Did not qualify									3rd	8	3	3	2	16	8
1992	Sweden	Did not qualify									3rd	6	2	1	3	7	6
1996	England	Did not qualify									3rd	10	4	3	3	17	13
2000	Belgium; Netherlands	Group stage	12th	3	1	0	2	2	5	Squad	Qualified as co-hosts						
2004	Portugal	Did not qualify									3rd	8	5	1	2	11	9
2008	Austria; Switzerland	Did not qualify									5th	14	5	3	6	14	16
2012	Poland; Ukraine	Did not qualify									3rd	10	4	3	3	21	15
2016	France	Quarter-finals	6th	5	3	0	2	9	5	Squad	1st	10	7	2	1	24	5
2020	Europe	Quarter-finals	5th	5	4	0	1	9	3	Squad	1st	10	10	0	0	40	3
2024	Germany	Round of 16	10th	4	1	1	2	2	2	Squad	1st	8	6	2	0	22	4
2028	United Kingdom; Ireland	To be determined									To be determined						
2032	Italy; Turkey	To be determined									To be determined						
Total		Runners-up	7/17	26	12	3	11	33	30	—	7/17	122	65	28	29	232	119
Champions Runners-up Third place

=== UEFA Nations League ===
UEFA Nations League record
League phase / quarter-finals												Finals									
Season	LG	Grp	Pos.	Pld	W	D	L	GF	GA	P/R	IR	Year	Host(s)	Round	Pld	W	D	L	GF	GA	Squad
2018–19	A	2	2nd	4	3	0	1	9	6	Same position	5th	2019	Portugal	Did not qualify							
2020–21	A	2	1st	6	5	0	1	16	6	Same position	2nd	2021	Italy	Fourth place	2	0	0	2	3	5	Squad
2022–23	A	4	2nd	6	3	1	2	11	8	Same position	7th	2023	Netherlands	Did not qualify							
2024–25	A	2	3rd	6	1	1	4	6	9	Same position	12th	2025	Germany	Did not qualify							
2024–25	A	Relegation play-off		2	1	0	1	4	3	Same position	12th	2025	Germany	Did not qualify							
2026–27	A	1	2nd	6	4	0	2	14	7	Same position	6th	2027		To be determined							
2026–27	A	Quarter-finals		0	0	0	0	0	0	Same position	6th	2027		To be determined							
Total				30	17	2	11	60	39	2nd		Total:1/4		Fourth place	2	0	0	2	3	5	—
Champions Runners-up Third place

=== Olympic Games ===
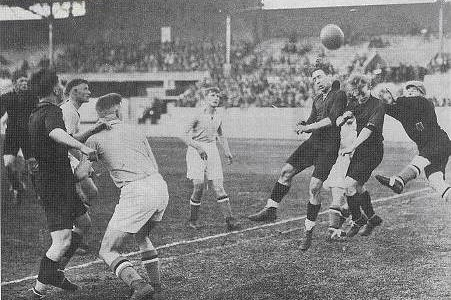
Hectic phase during the goal-rich Olympic win against Luxembourg in 1928 (5–3)

The football tournament for senior men's national teams took place in six Summer Olympics between 1908 and 1936. The Belgian squad participated in all three Olympic Games in the 1920s and won the gold medal at home at the 1920 edition. Two other Belgian delegations appeared at the Olympics. At the 1900 Summer Olympics, a Belgian representation with mainly students won bronze, and at the 2008 edition, Belgium's U-23 selection placed fourth.

Belgium's 1920 Olympic squad was given a bye into the quarter-finals, where they won 3–1 against Spain, and reached the semi-finals, where they beat the Netherlands 3–0. In the first half of the final against Czechoslovakia, the Belgians led 2–0. Forward Robert Coppée converted a disputed early penalty, and the action in which attacker Henri Larnoe doubled the score was also a matter of debate. After the dismissal of the Czechoslovak left-back Karel Steiner, the discontented visitors left the pitch in the 40th minute. Afterwards, the away team reported their reasons for protest to the Olympic organisation; these complaints were dismissed and the Czechoslovaks were disqualified. The 2–0 score was allowed to stand and Belgium were crowned the champions.

Olympic Games record
Year	Host(s)	Round	Pld	W	D	L	GF	GA	Squad
1896	Greece	No Olympic football tournament							
1900	France	Third place	1	0	0	1	2	6	Squad
1904 to 1912		Did not enter							
1920	Belgium	Champions	3	3	0	0	8	1	Squad
1924	France	Round of 16	1	0	0	1	1	8	Squad
1928	Netherlands	Quarter-finals	3	1	0	2	9	12	Squad
1932	United States	No Olympic football tournament							
1936 to 1976		Did not enter							
1980 to 1984		Did not qualify							
1988	South Korea	Did not enter							
1992 to present		See Belgium national under-23 team							
Total		1 Titles	14	7	0	7	27	37	—
Champions Runners-up Third place

Olympic Games has been an under-23 tournament since 1992 (with three players of over 23 years of age allowed in the squad).

== Honours ==
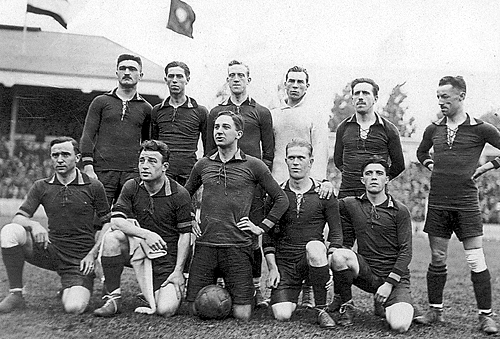
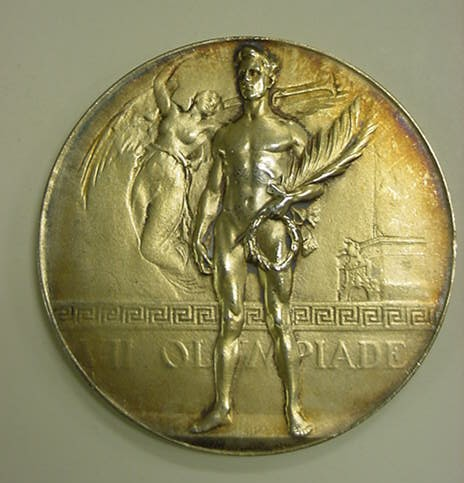
Belgium's 1920 Olympic football champions, and one of the 154 gold medals awarded at the 1920 Summer Olympics

=== Global ===
- FIFA World Cup
  - Third place: 2018
- Olympic Games
  - Champions: 1920
  - Third place: 1900^{1}

=== Continental ===
- UEFA European Championship
  - Runners-up: 1980
  - Third place: 1972

=== Awards ===
- FIFA Team of the Year: 2015, 2018, 2019, 2020, 2021
- FIFA World Cup Fair Play Trophy: 2002
- Belgian Sports Merit Award: 1980
- Belgian Sportsteam of the Year: 2013, 2014

=== Summary ===
Competition	1st place, gold medalist(s)	2nd place, silver medalist(s)	3rd place, bronze medalist(s)	Total
FIFA World Cup	0	0	1	1
UEFA European Championship	0	1	1	2
Olympic Games	1	0	1	2
Total	1	1	3	5

Notes

1. Demonstration matches played by clubs teams, officially not recognized by FIFA. The University of Brussels participated.

== See also ==
- Belgium men's national football team results – unofficial matches
- Belgium men's national football B team
- Belgium men's national youth football team (U–15 – U–21 squads)
- Belgian Congo men's national football team (1948–60)
- Belgium women's national football team
- Belgian First Division A
- Sport in Belgium

== Footnotes ==
Achievements
Preceded by 1912 Great Britain	Olympic Champions; 1920 (First title)	Succeeded by 1924 Uruguay
Awards
Preceded by Germany	FIFA Team of the Year; 2015	Succeeded by Argentina
Preceded by Germany	FIFA Team of the Year; 2018–2021	Succeeded by Brazil
