= 1982–83 UEFA Cup =

12th season of Europe's secondary club football tournament organised by UEFA

Tournament details
- Dates: 8 September 1982 – 18 May 1983
- Teams: 64 (from 31 associations)

Final positions
- Champions: (Belgium) Anderlecht (1st title)
- Runners-up: (Portugal) Benfica

Tournament statistics
- Matches played: 126
- Goals scored: 352 (2.79 per match)
- Attendance: 3,034,148 (24,081 per match)
- Top scorer(s): Zoran Filipović (Benfica); 8 goals

The 1982–83 UEFA Cup was the 12th edition of the UEFA Cup, the third-tier club football competition organised by UEFA. The final was played over two legs at the Heysel Stadium, Brussels, Belgium, and at the Estádio da Luz, Lisbon, Portugal, between Anderlecht of Belgium and Benfica of Portugal. Anderlecht won by an aggregate result of 2–1 to claim their first and only UEFA Cup title.

As of 2024, Anderlecht remains the only Belgian team to have won either the UEFA Cup or its successor tournament, the UEFA Europa League. It was also their third and final win in a European competition, following the 1975–76 and 1977–78 editions of the European Cup Winners' Cup.

== Association team allocation ==
A total of 64 teams from 31 UEFA member associations participated in the 1982–83 UEFA Cup, all entering from the first round over six knock-out rounds. The association ranking based on the UEFA country coefficients is used to determine the number of participating teams for each association:

- Associations 1–3 each have four teams qualify.
- Associations 4–8 each have three teams qualify.
- Associations 9–21 each have two teams qualify.
- Associations 22–32 each have one team qualify.

=== Association ranking ===
For the 1982–83 UEFA Cup, the associations are allocated places according to their 1981 UEFA country coefficients, which takes into account their performance in European competitions from 1976–77 to 1980–81.

Association ranking for 1982–83 UEFA Cup

Rank	Association	Coeff.	Teams	Notes
1	West Germany	52.284	4	
2	England	38.760	4	
3	Spain	36.999	4	
4	Netherlands	35.916	3	
5	Belgium	31.966	3	
6	France	30.250	3	
7	East Germany	28.600	3	
8	Soviet Union	27.050	3	
9	Italy	26.165	3	
10	Czechoslovakia	24.550	2	
11	(Socialist Federal Republic of Yugoslavia) Yugoslavia	24.300	2	
12	Switzerland	21.650	2	
13	Hungary	19.400	2	
14	Scotland	18.500	2	
15	Portugal	18.000	2	
-	Wales	17.000	0	
16	Bulgaria	16.950	2	

Rank	Association	Coeff.	Teams	Notes
17	Greece	14.750	2	
18	Sweden	14.000	2	
19	Poland	13.850	2	
20	Austria	13.500	2	
21	Romania	13.300	2	
22	Denmark	13.000	1	
23	(Republic of Ireland) Republic of Ireland	8.665	1	
24	Turkey	7.750	1	
25	Norway	7.083	1	
26	Cyprus	4.998	1	
27	(Northern Ireland) Northern Ireland	4.666	1	
28	Malta	3.997	1	
29	Luxembourg	3.666	1	
30	Albania	3.500	0	
31	Finland	3.499	1	
32	Iceland	3.331	1	

Wales: There was no national league in Wales before 1992 and the only competition organised by the Football Association of Wales was the Welsh Cup so Wales had just a single participant in European competitions, the winner (or best placed Welsh team as several English teams also competed) of the Welsh Cup which competed in the UEFA Cup Winners' Cup. Its virtual ranking is only an original research, because the UEFA country ranking was only used to allocate the UEFA Cup spots at time, so Wales was not included.
Albania: Until 1985, Albania frequently withdrew their allocated place in the UEFA Cup due to political reasons. Flamurtari would have qualified by league position. This additional place went to the 9th placed association, Italy.

=== Teams ===
The labels in the parentheses show how each team qualified for competition:

- TH: Title holders
- CW: Cup winners
- CR: Cup runners-up
- LC: League Cup winners
- 2nd, 3rd, 4th, 5th, 6th, etc.: League position
- P-W: End-of-season European competition play-offs winners

Qualified teams for 1982–83 UEFA Cup
(West Germany) Köln (2nd)	(West Germany) Kaiserslautern (4th)	(West Germany) Werder Bremen (5th)	(West Germany) Borussia Dortmund (6th)
(England) Ipswich Town (2nd)	(England) Manchester United (3rd)	(England) Arsenal (5th)	(England) Southampton (7th)
(Spain) Athletic Bilbao (4th)	(Spain) Valencia (5th)	(Spain) Real Betis (6th)	(Spain) Sevilla (7th)
(Netherlands) PSV Eindhoven (2nd)	(Netherlands) HFC Haarlem (4th)	(Netherlands) Utrecht (5th)	(Belgium) Anderlecht (2nd)
(Belgium) Gent (3rd)	(Belgium) Lokeren (4th)	(France) Saint-Étienne (2nd)	(France) Sochaux (3rd)
(France) Bordeaux (4th)	(East Germany) Lokomotive Leipzig (3rd)	(East Germany) Vorwärts Frankfurt (4th)	(East Germany) Carl Zeiss Jena (5th)
(Soviet Union) Spartak Moscow (2nd)	(Soviet Union) Dinamo Tbilisi (3rd)	(Soviet Union) Dynamo Moscow (4th)	(Italy) Fiorentina (2nd)
(Italy) Roma (3rd)	(Italy) Napoli (4th)	(Czechoslovakia) Baník Ostrava (2nd)	(Czechoslovakia) Bohemians (3rd)
(Socialist Federal Republic of Yugoslavia) Hajduk Split (3rd)	(Socialist Federal Republic of Yugoslavia) Sarajevo (4th)	(Switzerland) Servette (2nd)	(Switzerland) Zürich (3rd)
(Hungary) Ferencváros (2nd)	(Hungary) Tatabánya (3rd)	(Scotland) Rangers (3rd)	(Scotland) Dundee United (4th)
(Portugal) Benfica (2nd)	(Portugal) Porto (3rd)	(Bulgaria) Levski Sofia (2nd)	(Bulgaria) Slavia Sofia (3rd)
(Greece) PAOK (3rd)	(Greece) AEK Athens (4th)	(Sweden) IFK Norrköping (3rd)	(Sweden) Brage (4th)
(Poland) Śląsk Wrocław (2nd)	(Poland) Stal Mielec (3rd)	(Austria) GAK (3rd)	(Austria) Admira Wacker (4th)
(Romania) Universitatea Craiova (2nd)	(Romania) Corvinul Hunedoara (3rd)	(Denmark) Lyngby (2nd)	(Republic of Ireland) Shamrock Rovers (2nd)
(Turkey) Trabzonspor (2nd)	(Norway) Viking (2nd)	(Cyprus) Pezoporikos Larnaca (2nd)	(Northern Ireland) Glentoran (2nd)
(Malta) Zurrieq (3rd)	(Luxembourg) Progrès Niederkorn (2nd)	(Finland) KPT Kuopio (2nd)	(Iceland) Fram (2nd)

== Schedule ==
The schedule of the competition was as follows. Matches were scheduled for Wednesdays, though some matches exceptionally took place on Tuesdays or Thursdays.

Schedule for 1982–83 UEFA Cup
Round	First leg	Second leg
First round	8–29 September 1982	28 September – 6 October 1982
Second round	20–21 October 1982	3–4 November 1982
Third round	24 November 1982	8 December 1982
Quarter-finals	2 March 1983	16 March 1983
Semi-finals	6 April 1983	20 April 1983
Final	4 May 1983	18 May 1983

== Bracket ==
First round
(Poland) Śląsk Wrocław	2	1	3
(Soviet Union) Dynamo Moscow	2	0	2
(Luxembourg) Progrès Niederkorn	0	0	0
(Switzerland) Servette	1	3	4
(France) Saint-Étienne	4	0	4
(Hungary) Tatabánya	1	0	1
(Czech Republic) Bohemians	5	2	7
(Austria) Admira/Wacker	0	1	1
(Norway) Viking (a)	1	2	3
(East Germany) Lokomotive Leipzig	0	3	3
(Scotland) Dundee United	1	2	3
(Netherlands) PSV Eindhoven	1	0	1
(East Germany) Vorwärts Frankfurt	1	2	3
(West Germany) Werder Bremen (a)	3	0	3
(Denmark) Lyngby	1	2	3
(Sweden) Brage	2	2	4
(Soviet Union) Spartak Moscow	3	5	8
(England) Arsenal	2	2	4
(Netherlands) Haarlem	2	3	5
(Belgium) Gent	1	3	4
(England) Manchester United	0	1	1
(Spain) Valencia	0	2	2
(Northern Ireland) Glentoran	1	0	1
(Czech Republic) Baník Ostrava	3	1	4
(Belgium) Anderlecht	3	3	6
(Finland) KPT	0	1	1
(Netherlands) Utrecht	0	0	0
(Portugal) Porto	1	2	3
(Austria) GAK	1	0	1
(Romania) Corvinul Hunedoara	1	3	4
(Bulgaria) Slavia Sofia	2	2	4
(Socialist Federal Republic of Yugoslavia) Sarajevo	2	4	6
(West Germany) Borussia Dortmund	0	0	0
(Scotland) Rangers	0	2	2
(Greece) AEK Athens	0	0	0
(West Germany) Köln	1	5	6
(Italy) Roma	3	1	4
(England) Ipswich Town	0	3	3
(England) Southampton	2	0	2
(Sweden) Norrköping (a)	2	0	2
(Hungary) Ferencváros	2	1	3
(Spain) Athletic Bilbao	1	1	2
(Cyprus) Pezoporikos Larnaca	2	0	2
(Switzerland) Zürich	2	1	3
(Portugal) Benfica	2	2	4
(Spain) Real Betis	1	1	2
(Poland) Stal Mielec	1	0	1
(Belgium) Lokeren (a)	1	0	1
(Greece) PAOK (a)	1	1	2
(France) Sochaux	0	2	2
(Spain) Sevilla	3	3	6
(Bulgaria) Levski Sofia	1	0	1
(Soviet Union) Dinamo Tbilisi	2	0	2
(Italy) Napoli (a)	1	1	2
(West Germany) Kaiserslautern	3	3	6
(Turkey) Trabzonspor	0	0	0
(Malta) Żurrieq	1	0	1
(Socialist Federal Republic of Yugoslavia) Hajduk Split	4	4	8
(East Germany) Carl Zeiss Jena	3	0	3
(France) Bordeaux	1	5	6
(Iceland) Fram	0	0	0
(Republic of Ireland) Shamrock Rovers	3	4	7
(Romania) Universitatea Craiova	3	0	3
(Italy) Fiorentina	1	1	2

Second round
(Poland) Śląsk Wrocław	0	1	1
(Switzerland) Servette	2	5	7
(France) Saint-Étienne	0	0	0
(Czech Republic) Bohemians	0	4	4
(Norway) Viking	1	0	1
(Scotland) Dundee United	3	0	3
(West Germany) Werder Bremen	2	6	8
(Sweden) Brage	0	2	2
(Soviet Union) Spartak Moscow	2	3	5
(Netherlands) Haarlem	0	1	1
(Spain) Valencia	1	0	1
(Czech Republic) Baník Ostrava	0	0	0
(Belgium) Anderlecht	4	2	6
(Portugal) Porto	0	3	3
(Romania) Corvinul Hunedoara	4	0	4
(Socialist Federal Republic of Yugoslavia) Sarajevo	4	4	8
(Scotland) Rangers	2	0	2
(West Germany) Köln	1	5	6
(Italy) Roma (p)	1	0	1
(Sweden) Norrköping	0	1	1
(Hungary) Ferencváros	1	0	1
(Switzerland) Zürich	1	1	2
(Portugal) Benfica	2	2	4
(Belgium) Lokeren	0	1	1
(Greece) PAOK	2	0	2
(Spain) Sevilla	0	4	4
(Italy) Napoli	1	0	1
(West Germany) Kaiserslautern	2	2	4
(Socialist Federal Republic of Yugoslavia) Hajduk Split	4	0	4
(France) Bordeaux	1	4	5
(Republic of Ireland) Shamrock Rovers	0	0	0
(Romania) Universitatea Craiova	2	3	5

Round of 16
(Switzerland) Servette	2	1	3
(Czech Republic) Bohemians	2	2	4
(Scotland) Dundee United	2	1	3
(West Germany) Werder Bremen	1	1	2
(Soviet Union) Spartak Moscow	0	0	0
(Spain) Valencia	0	2	2
(Belgium) Anderlecht	6	0	6
(Socialist Federal Republic of Yugoslavia) Sarajevo	1	1	2
(West Germany) Köln	1	0	1
(Italy) Roma	0	2	2
(Switzerland) Zürich	1	0	1
(Portugal) Benfica	1	4	5
(Spain) Sevilla	1	0	1
(West Germany) Kaiserslautern	0	4	4
(France) Bordeaux	1	0	1
(Romania) Universitatea Craiova	0	2	2

Quarter-finals
(Czech Republic) Bohemians	1	0	1
(Scotland) Dundee United	0	0	0
(Spain) Valencia	1	1	2
(Belgium) Anderlecht	2	3	5
(Italy) Roma	1	1	2
(Portugal) Benfica	2	1	3
(Germany) Kaiserslautern	3	0	3
(Romania) Universitatea Craiova (a)	2	1	3

Semi-finals
(Czech Republic) Bohemians	0	1	1
(Belgium) Anderlecht	1	3	4
(Portugal) Benfica (a)	0	1	1
(Romania) Universitatea Craiova	0	1	1

Final
(Belgium) Anderlecht	1	1	2
(Portugal) Benfica	0	1	1

== First round ==
Team 1	Agg.	Team 2	1st leg	2nd leg
Kaiserslautern (West Germany)	6–0	(Turkey) Trabzonspor	3–0	3–0
Roma (Italy)	4–3	(England) Ipswich Town	3–0	1–3
AEK Athens (Greece)	0–6	(West Germany) Köln	0–1	0–5
Saint-Étienne (France)	4–1	(Hungary) Tatabányai Bányász	4–1	0–0
Borussia Dortmund (West Germany)	0–2	(Scotland) Rangers	0–0	0–2
Dundee United (Scotland)	3–1	(Netherlands) PSV Eindhoven	1–1	2–0
Utrecht (Netherlands)	0–3	(Portugal) Porto	0–1	0–2
Bohemians (Czechoslovakia)	7–1	(Austria) Admira/Wacker	5–0	2–1
Carl Zeiss Jena (East Germany)	3–6	(France) Bordeaux	3–1	0–5
Dinamo Tbilisi (Soviet Union)	2–2 (a)	(Italy) Napoli	2–1	0–1
Progrès Niederkorn (Luxembourg)	0–4	(Switzerland) Servette	0–1	0–3
Spartak Moscow (Soviet Union)	8–4	(England) Arsenal	3–2	5–2
Universitatea Craiova (Romania)	3–2	(Italy) Fiorentina	3–1	0–1
Vorwärts Frankfurt (East Germany)	3–3 (a)	(West Germany) Werder Bremen	1–3	2–0
Ferencváros (Hungary)	3–2	(Spain) Athletic Bilbao	2–1	1–1
Glentoran (Northern Ireland)	1–4	(Czechoslovakia) Baník Ostrava	1–3	0–1
GAK (Austria)	1–4	(Romania) Corvinul Hunedoara	1–1	0–3
HFC Haarlem (Netherlands)	5–4	(Belgium) Gent	2–1	3–3
Fram (Iceland)	0–7	(Republic of Ireland) Shamrock Rovers	0–3	0–4
Lyngby (Denmark)	3–4	(Sweden) Brage	1–2	2–2
Manchester United (England)	1–2	(Spain) Valencia	0–0	1–2
PAOK (Greece)	2–2 (a)	(France) Sochaux	1–0	1–2 (a.e.t.)
Pezoporikos Larnaca (Cyprus)	2–3	(Switzerland) Zürich	2–2	0–1
Slavia Sofia (Bulgaria)	4–6	(Socialist Federal Republic of Yugoslavia) Sarajevo	2–2	2–4
Anderlecht (Belgium)	6–1	(Finland) KPT Kuopio	3–0	3–1
Sevilla (Spain)	6–1	(Bulgaria) Levski Sofia	3–1	3–0
Benfica (Portugal)	4–2	(Spain) Real Betis	2–1	2–1
Śląsk Wrocław (Poland)	3–2	(Soviet Union) Dynamo Moscow	2–2	1–0
Southampton (England)	2–2 (a)	(Sweden) IFK Norrköping	2–2	0–0
Stal Mielec (Poland)	1–1 (a)	(Belgium) Lokeren	1–1	0–0
Viking (Norway)	3–3 (a)	(East Germany) Lokomotive Leipzig	1–0	2–3
Żurrieq (Malta)	1–8	(Socialist Federal Republic of Yugoslavia) Hajduk Split	1–4	0–4

=== First leg ===
8 September 1982
20:00

Progrès Niederkorn (Luxembourg)	0–1	(Switzerland) Servette
	Report	Brigger 58'

Stade Jos Haupert, Niederkorn
Attendance: 717
Referee: Werner Föckler (West Germany)

15 September 1982
15:30

Pezoporikos Larnaca (Cyprus)	2–2	(Switzerland) Zürich
Theofanous 24'; Vernon 35'	Report	Seiler 40'; Jerković 50'

GSZ Stadium, Larnaca
Attendance: 3,000
Referee: Akhmed Yasharov (Bulgaria)

15 September 1982
16:00

Dinamo Tbilisi (Soviet Union)	2–1	(Italy) Napoli
Khizanishvili 3'; Shengelia 33'	Report	Díaz 20'

Lenin Dinamo Stadium, Tbilisi
Attendance: 80,550
Referee: Bob Valentine (Scotland)

15 September 1982
16:00

Universitatea Craiova (Romania)	3–1	(Italy) Fiorentina
Ungureanu 55'; Cârțu 72'; Balaci 87'	Report	D. Bertoni 37'

Stadionul Central, Craiova
Attendance: 40,000
Referee: Alexis Ponnet (Belgium)

22 September 1982
16:45

Żurrieq (Malta)	1–4	(Socialist Federal Republic of Yugoslavia) Hajduk Split
Farrugia 46'	Report	Pešić 2'; Adamović 13'; Gudelj 41'; Jerolimov 66'

Ta' Qali National Stadium, Ta' Qali
Attendance: 3,172
Referee: Paolo Bergamo (Italy)

15 September 1982
17:00

Bohemians (Czechoslovakia)	5–0	(Austria) Admira/Wacker
Čermák 17'; Příložný 26', 32', 89'; V. Hruška 69'	Report

Ďolíček, Prague
Attendance: 6,800
Referee: Heikki Tuominen (Finland)

15 September 1982
17:00

Carl Zeiss Jena (East Germany)	3–1	(France) Bordeaux
Schnuphase 8', 62'; Töpfer 77'	Report	Giresse 72'

Ernst Abbe Sportfield, Jena
Attendance: 16,000
Referee: Ulf Eriksson (Sweden)

14 September 1982
17:00

Spartak Moscow (Soviet Union)	3–2	(England) Arsenal
Shvetsov 37'; Gavrilov 69' (pen.), 88'	Report	Robson 15'; Chapman 28'

Central Lenin Stadium, Moscow
Attendance: 68,500
Referee: Gianfranco Menegali (Italy)

15 September 1982
17:00

Vorwärts Frankfurt (East Germany)	1–3	(West Germany) Werder Bremen
Krautzig 89'	Report	Meier 32'; Reinders 56'; Völler 61'

Stadion der Freundschaft, Frankfurt (Oder)
Attendance: 17,000
Referee: Emilio Soriano Aladrén (Spain)

14 September 1982
17:30

Slavia Sofia (Bulgaria)	2–2	(Socialist Federal Republic of Yugoslavia) Sarajevo
Radkov 17', 89'	Report	Pašić 22', 85'

Ovcha Kupel Stadium, Sofia
Attendance: 6,500
Referee: Ruedi Renggli (Switzerland)

15 September 1982
18:00

Ferencváros (Hungary)	2–1	(Spain) Athletic Bilbao
Szokolai 16'; Pölöskei 32'	Report	Sola 56'

Üllői úti Stadion, Budapest
Attendance: 16,000
Referee: Heinz Fahnler (Austria)

15 September 1982
19:00

Śląsk Wrocław (Poland)	2–2	(Soviet Union) Dynamo Moscow
Sybis 1'; Socha 17'	Report	Mentyukov 35'; Javadov 50'

Stadion Olimpijski, Wrocław
Attendance: 25,000
Referee: Svein-Inge Thime (Norway)

15 September 1982
19:00

Viking (Norway)	1–0	(East Germany) Lokomotiv Leipzig
Refvik 49'	Report

Stavanger Stadion, Stavanger
Attendance: 5,059
Referee: Éamonn Farrell (Republic of Ireland)

15 September 1982
19:30

Borussia Dortmund (West Germany)	0–0	(Scotland) Rangers
	Report

Westfalenstadion, Dortmund
Attendance: 43,000
Referee: Bruno Galler (Switzerland)

22 September 1982
19:30

Fram (Iceland)	0–3	(Republic of Ireland) Shamrock Rovers
	Report	Murphy 30'; Campbell 43'; Gaynor 89'

Laugardalsvöllur, Reykjavík
Attendance: 567
Referee: Roger Verhaeghe (Belgium)

16 September 1982
19:30

Lyngby (Denmark)	1–2	(Sweden) Brage
Jensen 73'	Report	Gyllenvåg 11'; Sørensen 87' (o.g.)

Lyngby Stadion, Kongens Lyngby
Attendance: 2,803
Referee: Manfred Roßner (East Germany)

15 September 1982
19:30

Stal Mielec (Poland)	1–1	(Belgium) Lokeren
Buda 85'	Report	Van der Gijp 69'

Stadion Stali Mielec, Mielec
Attendance: 28,500
Referee: David Richardson (England)

15 September 1982
20:00

Kaiserslautern (West Germany)	3–0	(Turkey) Trabzonspor
Nilsson 20'; Briegel 70', 76'	Report

Betzenbergstadion, Kaiserslautern
Attendance: 17,238
Referee: Josef Poucek (Czechoslovakia)

15 September 1982
20:00

Utrecht (Netherlands)	0–1	(Portugal) Porto
	Report	Sousa 32'

Oosterpark Stadion, Groningen
Attendance: 3,750
Referee: Bernd Stumpf (East Germany)

15 September 1982
20:00

HFC Haarlem (Netherlands)	2–1	(Belgium) Gent
Kleton 36'; Haar 75'	Report	Tokodi 82' (pen.)

Haarlem Stadion, Haarlem
Attendance: 8,303
Referee: Ib Nielsen (Denmark)

15 September 1982
20:00

PAOK (Greece)	1–0	(France) Sochaux
Dimopoulos 80'	Report

Toumba Stadium, Thessaloniki
Attendance: 22,000
Referee: Adolf Prokop (East Germany)

15 September 1982
20:00

Anderlecht (Belgium)	3–0	(Finland) KPT Kuopio
Vercauteren 4'; Vandenbergh 36' (pen.); Brylle 69'	Report

Stade Emile Versé, Brussels
Attendance: 8,700
Referee: Norbert Rolles (Luxembourg)

15 September 1982
20:30

Roma (Italy)	3–0	(England) Ipswich Town
Osman 3' (o.g.); Pruzzo 36', 68'	Report

Stadio Olimpico, Rome
Attendance: 60,334
Referee: Talat Tokat (Turkey)

15 September 1982
20:30

Saint-Étienne (France)	4–1	(Hungary) Tatabányai Bányász
Rep 5'; Daniel 72'; Roussey 87'; Genghini 89'	Report	Weimper 24'

Stade Geoffroy-Guichard, Saint-Étienne
Attendance: 12,005
Referee: Augusto Marques Pires (Portugal)

15 September 1982
20:30

Dundee United (Scotland)	1–1	(Netherlands) PSV Eindhoven
Dodds 36'	Report	W. van de Kerkhof 67'

Tannadice Park, Dundee
Attendance: 12,223
Referee: Volker Roth (West Germany)

15 September 1982
20:30

Glentoran (Northern Ireland)	1–3	(Czechoslovakia) Baník Ostrava
Bowers 62'	Report	Šreiner 7'; Daněk 69'; Antalík 76'

The Oval, Belfast
Attendance: 2,231
Referee: Henk Weerink (Netherlands)

15 September 1982
20:30

GAK (Austria)	1–1	(Romania) Corvinul Hunedoara
Schwicker 53'	Report	Gabor 15'

Bundesstadion Graz-Liebenau, Graz
Attendance: 4,000
Referee: Jozef Marko (Czechoslovakia)

15 September 1982
20:30

Manchester United (England)	0–0	(Spain) Valencia
	Report

Old Trafford, Manchester
Attendance: 46,599
Referee: Dušan Krchňák (Czechoslovakia)

15 September 1982
20:30

Southampton (England)	2–2	(Sweden) IFK Norrköping
Williams 62'; Wright 86'	Report	S. Pettersson 48', 82'

The Dell, Southampton
Attendance: 10,155
Referee: Miklós Nagy (Hungary)

15 September 1982
22:00

Sevilla (Spain)	3–1	(Bulgaria) Levski Sofia
Santi 33' (pen.); Montero 63'; Magdaleno 74'	Report	Spasov 31'

Estadio Ramón Sánchez Pizjuán, Seville
Attendance: 18,000
Referee: Enzo Barbaresco (Italy)

15 September 1982
22:00

Benfica (Portugal)	2–1	(Spain) Real Betis
Nené 44' (pen.); Padinha 73'	Report	Diarte 76'

Estádio da Luz, Lisbon
Attendance: 65,000
Referee: George Courtney (England)

29 September 1982
20:00

AEK Athens (Greece)	0–1	(West Germany) Köln
	Report	Allofs 59'

AEK Stadium, Athens
Attendance: 12,461
Referee: Alexis Ponnet (Belgium)

=== Second leg ===
28 September 1982
17:30

Levski Sofia (Bulgaria)	0–3	(Spain) Sevilla
	Report	Magdaleno 16'; Santi 25'; Juan Carlos 70'

Stadion Levski, Sofia
Attendance: 35,000
Referee: Adolf Mathias (Austria)

Sevilla won 6–1 on aggregate.

28 September 1982
19:00

Admira/Wacker (Austria)	1–2	(Czechoslovakia) Bohemians
Binder 27'	Report	Zelenský 15'; Sloup 68'

Bundesstadion Südstadt, Maria Enzersdorf
Attendance: 1,500
Referee: Sándor Kuti (Hungary)

Bohemians won 7–1 on aggregate.

28 September 1982
20:00

Lokeren (Belgium)	0–0	(Poland) Stal Mielec
	Report

Daknamstadion, Lokeren
Attendance: 6,300
Referee: Kenny Hope (Scotland)

1–1 on aggregate; KSC Lokeren won on away goals.

29 September 1982
14:00

Corvinul Hunedoara (Romania)	3–0	(Austria) GAK
Andone 52' (pen.); Klein 63'; Dumitrache 84'	Report

Stadionul Corvinul, Hunedoara
Attendance: 6,500
Referee: Ihsan Türe (Turkey)

Corvinul Hunedoara won 4–1 on aggregate.

29 September 1982
14:30

Trabzonspor (Turkey)	0–3	(West Germany) Kaiserslautern
	Report	Eilenfeldt 3'; Briegel 41', 72'

Ankara
Attendance: 15,050
Referee: Octavian Streng (Romania)

Kaiserslautern won 6–0 on aggregate.

29 September 1982
14:30

Tatabányai Bányász (Hungary)	0–0	(France) Saint-Étienne
	Report

Városi Stadion, Tatabánya
Attendance: 3,483
Referee: David Syme (Scotland)

Saint-Étienne won 4–1 on aggregate.

29 September 1982
15:30

Sarajevo (Socialist Federal Republic of Yugoslavia)	4–2	(Bulgaria) Slavia Sofia
Musemić 11', 27', 85'; Sušić 89'	Report	Velichkov 40', 45'

Stadion Koševo, Sarajevo
Attendance: 18,750
Referee: John Hunting (England)

FK Sarajevo won 6–4 on aggregate.

29 September 1982
15:30

Hajduk Split (Socialist Federal Republic of Yugoslavia)	4–0	(Malta) Żurrieq
Jerolimov 24', 66'; Cukrov 72', 80'	Report

Stadion Poljud, Split
Attendance: 3,500
Referee: Vasos Konstantinou (Cyprus)

Hajduk Split won 8–1 on aggregate.

29 September 1982
17:00

Baník Ostrava (Czechoslovakia)	1–0	(Northern Ireland) Glentoran
Válek 47'	Report

Bazaly, Ostrava
Attendance: 10,000
Referee: Andrzej Libich (Poland)

Baník Ostrava won 4–1 on aggregate.

29 September 1982
17:00

Dynamo Moscow (Soviet Union)	0–1	(Poland) Śląsk Wrocław
	Report	Tarasiewicz 17'

Central Dynamo Stadium, Moscow
Attendance: 12,000
Referee: Dieter Pauly (West Germany)

Śląsk Wrocław won 3–2 on aggregate.

29 September 1982
17:00

Lokomotive Leipzig (East Germany)	3–2	(Norway) Viking
Liebers 56'; Kühn 61'; Zötzsche 86' (pen.)	Report	Brekke 66'; Refvik 83'

Zentralstadion, Leipzig
Attendance: 13,470
Referee: Jean-Marie Macheret (Switzerland)

3–3 on aggregate; Viking won on away goals.

29 September 1982
18:00

KPT Kuopio (Finland)	1–3	(Belgium) Anderlecht
J. Turunen 58'	Report	Vandenbergh 18'; Coeck 26'; Czerniatynski 89'

Kuopion keskuskenttä, Kuopio
Attendance: 2,163
Referee: Peer Frickmann (Denmark)

Anderlecht won 6–1 on aggregate.

29 September 1982
19:00

Brage (Sweden)	2–2	(Denmark) Lyngby
J. Larsen 49' (o.g.); R. Nilsson 89'	Report	Sørensen 36' (pen.); Schäfer 69'

Domnarvsvallen, Borlänge
Attendance: 3,341
Referee: Rolf Haugen (Norway)

IK Brage won 4–3 on aggregate.

29 September 1982
19:00

IFK Norrköping (Sweden)	0–0	(England) Southampton
	Report

Norrköpings Idrottspark, Norrköping
Attendance: 10,252
Referee: Aleksandr Mushkovets (Soviet Union)

2–2 on aggregate; IFK Norrköping won on away goals.

29 September 1982
20:00

Bordeaux (France)	5–0	(East Germany) Carl Zeiss Jena
Müller 7', 14', 66'; Giresse 35', 72'	Report

Stade du Parc Lescure, Bordeaux
Attendance: 17,000
Referee: Pietro D'Elia (Italy)

Bordeaux won 6–3 on aggregate.

29 September 1982
20:00

Werder Bremen (West Germany)	0–2	(East Germany) Vorwärts Frankfurt
	Report	Conrad 70'; Andrich 88'

Weserstadion, Bremen
Attendance: 21,000
Referee: Clive Thomas (Wales)

3–3 on aggregate; Werder Bremen won on away goals.

29 September 1982
20:00

Athletic Bilbao (Spain)	1–1	(Hungary) Ferencváros
Dani 16' (pen.)	Report	Szokolai 35'

Estadio San Mamés, Bilbao
Attendance: 25,000
Referee: Brian McGinlay (Scotland)

Ferencvárosi won 3–2 on aggregate.

29 September 1982
20:00

Gent (Belgium)	3–3	(Netherlands) HFC Haarlem
Koudijzer 22', 61'; Schapendonk 28'	Report	Böckling 2'; Kleton 69'; Keur 90'

Jules Ottenstadion, Ghent
Attendance: 9,604
Referee: Osmo Orakangas (Finland)

HFC Haarlem won 5–4 on aggregate.

29 September 1982
20:00

Sochaux (France)	2–1 (a.e.t.)	(Greece) PAOK
Anziani 90' (pen.), 98'	Report	Dimopoulos 94'

Stade Auguste Bonal, Montbéliard
Attendance: 13,000
Referee: Ron Bridges (Wales)

2–2 on aggregate; PAOK won on away goals.

29 September 1982
20:00

Zürich (Switzerland)	1–0	(Cyprus) Pezoporikos Larnaca
Lüdi 69'	Report

Letzigrund, Zürich
Attendance: 3,200
Referee: Gerald Losert (Austria)

Zürich won 3–2 on aggregate.

29 September 1982
20:00

Real Betis (Spain)	1–2	(Portugal) Benfica
Rincón 25'	Report	Carlos Manuel 66'; Nené 85'

Estadio Benito Villamarín, Seville
Attendance: 45,000
Referee: Michel Vautrot (France)

Benfica won 4–2 on aggregate.

29 September 1982
20:30

Ipswich Town (England)	3–1	(Italy) Roma
Gates 41'; McCall 54'; Butcher 71'	Report	Maldera 64'

Portman Road, Ipswich
Attendance: 17,751
Referee: Vojtech Christov (Czechoslovakia)

Roma won 4–3 on aggregate.

29 September 1982
20:30

Rangers (Scotland)	2–0	(West Germany) Borussia Dortmund
Cooper 43'; Johnstone 83'	Report

Ibrox Park, Glasgow
Attendance: 44,500
Referee: Nicolae Rainea (Romania)

Rangers won 2–0 on aggregate.

29 September 1982
20:30

PSV Eindhoven (Netherlands)	0–2	(Scotland) Dundee United
	Report	Kirkwood 5'; Hegarty 29'

Philips Stadion, Eindhoven
Attendance: 12,500
Referee: Eldar Azimzade (Soviet Union)

Dundee United won 3–1 on aggregate.

29 September 1982
20:30

Napoli (Italy)	1–0	(Soviet Union) Dinamo Tbilisi
Dal Fiume 59'	Report

Stadio San Paolo, Naples
Attendance: 73,250
Referee: Walter Eschweiler (West Germany)

2–2 on aggregate; Napoli won on away goals.

29 September 1982
20:30

Servette (Switzerland)	3–0	(Luxembourg) Progrès Niederkorn
Brigger 58'; Decastel 87'; Seramondi 89'	Report

Stade des Charmilles, Geneva
Attendance: 4,817
Referee: Anthony Mangion (Malta)

Servette won 4–0 on aggregate.

29 September 1982
20:30

Arsenal (England)	2–5	(Soviet Union) Spartak Moscow
McDermott 74'; Chapman 90'	Report	Shvetsov 27'; Rodionov 56'; Cherenkov 66'; Shavlo 71'; Gess 77'

Highbury Stadium, London
Attendance: 28,455
Referee: Emilio Carlos Guruceta (Spain)

Spartak Moscow won 8–4 on aggregate.

29 September 1982
20:30

Fiorentina (Italy)	1–0	(Romania) Universitatea Craiova
Antognoni 11' (pen.)	Report

Stadio Comunale, Florence
Attendance: 45,000
Referee: André Daina (Switzerland)

Universitatea Craiova won 3–2 on aggregate.

29 September 1982
21:00

Valencia (Spain)	2–1	(England) Manchester United
Solsona 71' (pen.); Roberto 74'	Report	Robson 45'

Estadio Luis Casanova, Valencia
Attendance: 28,500
Referee: Ioan Igna (Romania)

Valencia won 2–1 on aggregate.

30 September 1982
17:00

Porto (Portugal)	2–0	(Netherlands) Utrecht
José Costa 8'; Gomes 33'	Report

Estádio das Antas, Porto
Attendance: 19,000
Referee: George Courtney (England)

Porto won 3–0 on aggregate.

30 September 1982
21:00

Shamrock Rovers (Republic of Ireland)	4–0	(Iceland) Fram
O'Carroll 16'; Buckley 54'; Beglin 72'; Gaynor 88'	Report

Glenmalure Park, Dublin
Attendance: 2,247
Referee: Ole Amundsen (Denmark)

Shamrock Rovers won 7–0 on aggregate.

6 October 1982
20:00

Köln (West Germany)	5–0	(Greece) AEK Athens
Fischer 8', 25'; Šljivo 15', 61'; Engels 21'	Report

Müngersdorfer Stadion, Cologne
Attendance: 16,557
Referee: José García Carrión (Spain)

Köln won 6–0 on aggregate.

== Second round ==
Team 1	Agg.	Team 2	1st leg	2nd leg
Roma (Italy)	1–1 (4–2 p)	(Sweden) IFK Norrköping	1–0	0–1 (a.e.t.)
Saint-Étienne (France)	0–4	(Czechoslovakia) Bohemians	0–0	0–4
Corvinul Hunedoara (Romania)	4–8	(Socialist Federal Republic of Yugoslavia) Sarajevo	4–4	0–4
Spartak Moscow (Soviet Union)	5–1	(Netherlands) HFC Haarlem	2–0	3–1
Ferencváros (Hungary)	1–2	(Switzerland) Zürich	1–1	0–1
Hajduk Split (Socialist Federal Republic of Yugoslavia)	4–5	(France) Bordeaux	4–1	0–4
Napoli (Italy)	1–4	(West Germany) Kaiserslautern	1–2	0–2
PAOK (Greece)	2–4	(Spain) Sevilla	2–0	0–4
Anderlecht (Belgium)	6–3	(Portugal) Porto	4–0	2–3
Rangers (Scotland)	2–6	(West Germany) Köln	2–1	0–5
Shamrock Rovers (Republic of Ireland)	0–5	(Romania) Universitatea Craiova	0–2	0–3
Benfica (Portugal)	4–1	(Belgium) Lokeren	2–0	2–1
Śląsk Wrocław (Poland)	1–7	(Switzerland) Servette	0–2	1–5
Valencia (Spain)	1–0	(Czechoslovakia) Baník Ostrava	1–0	0–0
Viking (Norway)	1–3	(Scotland) Dundee United	1–3	0–0
Werder Bremen (West Germany)	8–2	(Sweden) Brage	2–0	6–2

=== First leg ===
20 October 1982
14:00

Corvinul Hunedoara (Romania)	4–4	(Socialist Federal Republic of Yugoslavia) Sarajevo
Dumitrache 37'; Andone 41'; Petcu 44'; Mateuț 54'	Report	Hadžialagić 7'; Lukić 17', 83'; Pašić 80'

Stadionul Corvinul, Hunedoara
Attendance: 12,000
Referee: Romualdas Yushka (Soviet Union)

20 October 1982
16:00

Benfica (Portugal)	2–0	(Belgium) Lokeren
Nené 20'; Pietra 66'	Report

Estádio da Luz, Lisbon
Attendance: 40,000
Referee: Dimitar Dimitrov (Bulgaria)

20 October 1982
17:00

Spartak Moscow (Soviet Union)	2–0	(Netherlands) HFC Haarlem
Gess 16'; Shvetsov 89'	Report

Central Lenin Stadium, Moscow
Attendance: 16,643
Referee: Edvard Sostarić (Yugoslavia)

20 October 1982
17:00

Hajduk Split (Socialist Federal Republic of Yugoslavia)	4–1	(France) Bordeaux
Bogdanović 37'; Jerolimov 47'; Šalov 58' (pen.); Cukrov 87'	Report	Bracci 6'

Stadion Poljud, Split
Attendance: 32,717
Referee: Keith Hackett (England)

20 October 1982
17:00

PAOK (Greece)	2–0	(Spain) Sevilla
Dimopoulos 49'; Kostikos 61'	Report

Toumba Stadium, Thessaloniki
Attendance: 20,000
Referee: Charles Corver (Netherlands)

20 October 1982
17:00

Śląsk Wrocław (Poland)	0–2	(Switzerland) Servette
	Report	Decastel 68'; Favre 78'

Stadion Olimpijski, Wrocław
Attendance: 20,000
Referee: John Carpenter (Republic of Ireland)

20 October 1982
18:00

Ferencváros (Hungary)	1–1	(Switzerland) Zürich
Szokolai 56'	Report	Seiler 18'

Üllői úti Stadion, Budapest
Attendance: 18,612
Referee: Victoriano Sánchez Arminio (Spain)

20 October 1982
19:00

Viking (Norway)	1–3	(Scotland) Dundee United
Henriksen 76'	Report	Milne 73', 80' (pen.); Sturrock 87'

Stavanger Stadion, Stavanger
Attendance: 8,890
Referee: Ole Amundsen (Denmark)

20 October 1982
20:00

Anderlecht (Belgium)	4–0	(Portugal) Porto
Lozano 6' (pen.), 15'; Czerniatynski 36'; Olsen 79'	Report

Stade Emile Versé, Brussels
Attendance: 17,000
Referee: Clive Thomas (Wales)

20 October 1982
20:00

Werder Bremen (West Germany)	2–0	(Sweden) Brage
Meier 44'; Okudera 63'	Report

Weserstadion, Bremen
Attendance: 9,700
Referee: Paul Rion (Luxembourg)

20 October 1982
20:30

Roma (Italy)	1–0	(Sweden) IFK Norrköping
Pruzzo 52' (pen.)	Report

Stadio Olimpico, Rome
Attendance: 54,833
Referee: Zoran Petrović (Yugoslavia)

20 October 1982
20:30

Saint-Étienne (France)	0–0	(Czech Republic) Bohemians
	Report

Stade Geoffroy-Guichard, Saint-Étienne
Attendance: 11,443
Referee: John Hunting (England)

20 October 1982
20:30

Napoli (Italy)	1–2	(West Germany) Kaiserslautern
Díaz 79'	Report	Nilsson 72'; Allofs 89'

Stadio San Paolo, Naples
Attendance: 55,000
Referee: Bogdan Dochev (Bulgaria)

20 October 1982
20:30

Rangers (Scotland)	2–1	(West Germany) Köln
Johnstone 10'; McClelland 85'	Report	Allofs 60'

Ibrox Park, Glasgow
Attendance: 30,420
Referee: Rolf Eriksson (Sweden)

20 October 1982
21:00

Valencia (Spain)	1–0	(Czechoslovakia) Baník Ostrava
Welzl 44'	Report

Estadio Luis Casanova, Valencia
Attendance: 18,000
Referee: Horst Brummeier (Austria)

21 October 1982
20:45

Shamrock Rovers (Republic of Ireland)	0–2	(Romania) Universitatea Craiova
	Report	Irimescu 4'; Balaci 59'

Glenmalure Park, Dublin
Attendance: 4,200
Referee: Alain Delmer (France)

=== Second leg ===
3 November 1982
12:30

Universitatea Craiova (Romania)	3–0	(Republic of Ireland) Shamrock Rovers
Campbell 30' (o.g.); Cârțu 53', 67'	Report

Stadionul Central, Craiova
Attendance: 20,000
Referee: László Győri (Hungary)

Universitatea Craiova won 5–0 on aggregate.

3 November 1982
14:30

Sarajevo (Socialist Federal Republic of Yugoslavia)	4–0	(Romania) Corvinul Hunedoara
Musemić 33'; Jozić 60'; Sušić 69'; Pašić 78'	Report

Stadion Koševo, Sarajevo
Attendance: 9,894
Referee: Gianfranco Menegali (Italy)

FK Sarajevo won 8–4 on aggregate.

3 November 1982
16:00

Baník Ostrava (Czechoslovakia)	0–0	(Spain) Valencia
	Report

Bazaly, Ostrava
Attendance: 19,065
Referee: Volker Roth (West Germany)

Valencia won 1–0 on aggregate.

3 November 1982
16:30

Bohemians (Czech Republic)	4–0	(France) Saint-Étienne
Němec 28'; Příložný 58'; Prokeš 61'; Mičinec 77'	Report

Ďolíček, Prague
Attendance: 16,000
Referee: Paolo Casarin (Italy)

Bohemians won 4–0 on aggregate.

3 November 1982
19:00

Brage (Sweden)	2–6	(West Germany) Werder Bremen
Wåhlström 72'; Arnberg 89'	Report	Völler 12', 47', 60'; Meier 20', 87'; Gruber 23'

Domnarvsvallen, Borlänge
Attendance: 3,452
Referee: Fred McKnight (Northern Ireland)

Werder Bremen won 8–2 on aggregate.

3 November 1982
19:00

IFK Norrköping (Sweden)	1–0 (a.e.t.)	(Italy) Roma
Bergman 59'	Report
Penalties
Lundqvist (penalty missed); S. Pettersson (penalty scored); Bergman (penalty scored); Svensson (penalty missed)	2–4	(penalty scored) Di Bartolomei; (penalty scored) Conti; (penalty scored) Chierico; (penalty scored) Righetti

Norrköpings Idrottspark, Norrköping
Attendance: 17,567
Referee: David Syme (Scotland)

1–1 on aggregate. Roma won 4–2 on penalties.

3 November 1982
20:00

Lokeren (Belgium)	1–2	(Portugal) Benfica
Van der Gijp 7'	Report	Filipović 57', 64'

Daknamstadion, Lokeren
Attendance: 13,000
Referee: Dušan Krchňák (Czechoslovakia)

Benfica won 4–1 on aggregate.

3 November 1982
20:00

Bordeaux (France)	4–0	(Socialist Federal Republic of Yugoslavia) Hajduk Split
Rohr 24'; Giresse 33', 76'; Thouvenel 51'	Report

Stade du Parc Lescure, Bordeaux
Attendance: 20,000
Referee: Franz Wöhrer (Austria)

Bordeaux won 5–4 on aggregate.

3 November 1982
20:00

Zürich (Switzerland)	1–0	(Hungary) Ferencváros
Seiler 56'	Report

Letzigrund, Zürich
Attendance: 9,100
Referee: Mircea Salomir (Romania)

FC Zürich won 2–1 on aggregate.

3 November 1982
20:00

Kaiserslautern (West Germany)	2–0	(Italy) Napoli
Nilsson 70'; Briegel 82'	Report

Betzenbergstadion, Kaiserslautern
Attendance: 28,318
Referee: George Courtney (England)

Kaiserslautern won 4–1 on aggregate.

3 November 1982
20:00

Köln (West Germany)	5–0	(Scotland) Rangers
Littbarski 7' (pen.); Engels 11', 21' (pen.); Fischer 19'; Allofs 52'	Report

Müngersdorfer Stadion, Cologne
Attendance: 57,000
Referee: Károly Palotai (Hungary)

Köln won 6–2 on aggregate.

3 November 1982
20:15

HFC Haarlem (Netherlands)	1–3	(Soviet Union) Spartak Moscow
Huyg 25'	Report	Shvetsov 43'; Shavlo 55'; Gavrilov 85'

Haarlem Stadion, Haarlem
Attendance: 14,500
Referee: Viriato Graça Oliva (Portugal)

Spartak Moscow won 5–1 on aggregate.

3 November 1982
20:30

Dundee United (Scotland)	0–0	(Norway) Viking
	Report

Tannadice Park, Dundee
Attendance: 10,611
Referee: Ole Amundsen (Denmark)

Dundee United won 3–1 on aggregate.

3 November 1982
21:00

Sevilla (Spain)	4–0	(Greece) PAOK
Santi 19'; López 39'; Magdaleno 56'; Pintinho 89'	Report

Estadio Ramón Sánchez Pizjuán, Seville
Attendance: 42,616
Referee: Vojtech Christov (Czechoslovakia)

Sevilla won 4–2 on aggregate.

3 November 1982
22:30

Porto (Portugal)	3–2	(Belgium) Anderlecht
Costa 63'; Walsh 67', 77'	Report	Coeck 18'; Vandenbergh 42'

Estádio das Antas, Porto
Attendance: 30,000
Referee: Jan Redelfs (West Germany)

Anderlecht won 6–3 on aggregate.

4 November 1982
12:00

Servette (Switzerland)	5–1	(Poland) Śląsk Wrocław
Favre 27' (pen.), 47'; Decastel 35', 73'; Brigger 37'	Report	Prusik 28'

Stade des Charmilles, Geneva
Attendance: 9,100
Referee: Heinz Fahnler (Austria)

Servette won 7–1 on aggregate.

== Third round ==
Team 1	Agg.	Team 2	1st leg	2nd leg
Köln (West Germany)	1–2	(Italy) Roma	1–0	0–2
Dundee United (Scotland)	3–2	(West Germany) Werder Bremen	2–1	1–1
Bordeaux (France)	1–2	(Romania) Universitatea Craiova	1–0	0–2 (a.e.t.)
FC Spartak Moscow (Soviet Union)	0–2	(Spain) Valencia	0–0	0–2
Zürich (Switzerland)	1–5	(Portugal) Benfica	1–1	0–4
Anderlecht (Belgium)	6–2	(Socialist Federal Republic of Yugoslavia) Sarajevo	6–1	0–1
Servette (Switzerland)	3–4	(Czechoslovakia) Bohemians	2–2	1–2
Sevilla (Spain)	1–4	(West Germany) Kaiserslautern	1–0	0–4

=== First leg ===
24 November 1982
16:00

Spartak Moscow (Soviet Union)	0–0	(Spain) Valencia
	Report

Lenin Dinamo Stadium, Tbilisi
Attendance: 28,800
Referee: Bruno Galler (Switzerland)

24 November 1982
20:00

Köln (West Germany)	1–0	(Italy) Roma
Allofs 40'	Report

Müngersdorfer Stadion, Cologne
Attendance: 43,500
Referee: Michel Vautrot (France)

24 November 1982
20:00

Zürich (Switzerland)	1–1	(Portugal) Benfica
W. Rufer 76'	Report	Filipović 86'

Letzigrund, Zürich
Attendance: 19,000
Referee: Siegfried Kirschen (East Germany)

24 November 1982
20:00

Anderlecht (Belgium)	6–1	(Socialist Federal Republic of Yugoslavia) Sarajevo
Lozano 5', 25'; Vandenbergh 32', 38'; Ferhatović 43' (o.g.); Vercauteren 62'	Report	Sušić 41'

Stade Emile Versé, Brussels
Attendance: 19,416
Referee: Erik Fredriksson (Sweden)

24 November 1982
20:00

Servette (Switzerland)	2–2	(Czechoslovakia) Bohemians
Schnyder 54'; Elia 81'	Report	Sloup 23'; Chaloupka 71'

Stade des Charmilles, Geneva
Attendance: 16,000
Referee: László Győri (Hungary)

24 November 1982
20:30

Bordeaux (France)	1–0	(Romania) Universitatea Craiova
Giresse 55' (pen.)	Report

Stade du Parc Lescure, Bordeaux
Attendance: 28,000
Referee: António Garrido (Portugal)

24 November 1982
21:00

Sevilla (Spain)	1–0	(West Germany) Kaiserslautern
Francisco 56'	Report

Estadio Ramón Sánchez Pizjuán, Seville
Attendance: 36,041
Referee: Bob Valentine (Scotland)

24 November 1982
21:30

Dundee United (Scotland)	2–1	(West Germany) Werder Bremen
Milne 15'; Narey 83'	Report	Meier 64'

Tannadice Park, Dundee
Attendance: 10,872
Referee: Heinz Fahnler (Austria)

=== Second leg ===
8 December 1982
12:00

Universitatea Craiova (Romania)	2 – 0 (a.e.t.)	(France) Bordeaux
Țicleanu 39'; Geolgău 101'	Report

Stadionul Central, Craiova
Attendance: 40,000
Referee: Jan Keizer (Netherlands)

Universitatea Craiova won 2–1 on aggregate.

8 December 1982
14:30

Roma (Italy)	2–0	(West Germany) Köln
Iorio 56'; Falcão 89'	Report

Stadio Olimpico, Rome
Attendance: 66,720
Referee: Roger Schoeters (Belgium)

Roma won 2–1 on aggregate.

8 December 1982
16:00

Sarajevo (Socialist Federal Republic of Yugoslavia)	1–0	(Belgium) Anderlecht
Musemić 39'	Report

Stadion Koševo, Sarajevo
Attendance: 26,667
Referee: Emilio Carlos Guruceta (Spain)

Anderlecht won 6–2 on aggregate.

8 December 1982
16:00

Bohemians (Czechoslovakia)	2–1	(Switzerland) Servette
Čermák 41'; Příložný 89' (pen.)	Report	Decastel 17'

Ďolíček, Prague
Attendance: 17,000
Referee: Henning Lund-Sørensen (Denmark)

Bohemians won 4–3 on aggregate.

8 December 1982
17:00

Valencia (Spain)	2–0	(Soviet Union) Spartak Moscow
Solsona 31'; Moreno 84'	Report

Estadio Luis Casanova, Valencia
Attendance: 47,000
Referee: Keith Hackett (England)

Valencia won 2–0 on aggregate.

8 December 1982
19:30

Werder Bremen (West Germany)	1–1	(Scotland) Dundee United
Völler 48'	Report	Hegarty 3'

Weserstadion, Bremen
Attendance: 37,580
Referee: Dušan Krchňák (Czechoslovakia)

Dundee United won 3–2 on aggregate.

8 December 1982
20:00

Kaiserslautern (West Germany)	4–0	(Spain) Sevilla
Nilsson 10'; Geye 18'; Brehme 43'; Eilenfeldt 64'	Report

Betzenbergstadion, Kaiserslautern
Attendance: 32,000
Referee: Luigi Agnolin (Italy)

Kaiserslautern won 4–1 on aggregate.

8 December 1982
21:00

Benfica (Portugal)	4–0	(Switzerland) Zürich
Filipović 12'; Diamantino 51'; Nené 60', 86' (pen.)	Report

Estádio da Luz, Lisbon
Attendance: 75,000
Referee: Volker Roth (West Germany)

Benfica won 5–1 on aggregate.

== Quarter-finals ==
Team 1	Agg.	Team 2	1st leg	2nd leg
Kaiserslautern (West Germany)	3–3 (a)	(Romania) Universitatea Craiova	3–2	0–1
Roma (Italy)	2–3	(Portugal) Benfica	1–2	1–1
Bohemians (Czechoslovakia)	1–0	(Scotland) Dundee United	1–0	0–0
Valencia (Spain)	2–5	(Belgium) Anderlecht	1–2	1–3

=== First leg ===
2 March 1983
15:00

Roma (Italy)	1–2	(Portugal) Benfica
Di Bartolomei 66' (pen.)	Report	Filipović 40', 59'

Stadio Olimpico, Rome
Attendance: 65,342
Referee: Horst Brummeier (Austria)

2 March 1983
17:00

Bohemians (Czechoslovakia)	1–0	(Scotland) Dundee United
Chaloupka 11'	Report

Ďolíček, Prague
Attendance: 16,000
Referee: Marcel Van Langenhove (Belgium)

2 March 1983
20:00

Kaiserslautern (West Germany)	3–2	(Romania) Universitatea Craiova
Brehme 24', 51'; Irimescu 40' (o.g.)	Report	Geolgău 53'; Crișan 72'

Betzenbergstadion, Kaiserslautern
Attendance: 23,269
Referee: Roger Schoeters (Belgium)

2 March 1983
21:00

Valencia (Spain)	1–2	(Belgium) Anderlecht
Solsona 42'	Report	Vercauteren 4'; Coeck 55'

Estadio Luis Casanova, Valencia
Attendance: 45,000
Referee: Brian McGinlay (Scotland)

=== Second leg ===
16 March 1983
13:00

Universitatea Craiova (Romania)	1–0	(West Germany) Kaiserslautern
Negrilă 82'	Report

Stadionul Central, Craiova
Attendance: 36,200
Referee: Keith Hackett (England)

3–3 on aggregate; Universitatea Craiova won on away goals.

16 March 1983
20:00

Anderlecht (Belgium)	3–1	(Spain) Valencia
Brylle 33', 61'; De Groote 38'	Report	Ribes 49'

Heysel Stadium, Brussels
Attendance: 40,000
Referee: Luigi Agnolin (Italy)

Anderlecht won 5–2 on aggregate.

16 March 1983
20:30

Dundee United (Scotland)	0–0	(Czechoslovakia) Bohemians
	Report

Tannadice Park, Dundee
Attendance: 21,336
Referee: André Daina (Switzerland)

Bohemians won 1–0 on aggregate.

16 March 1983
22:00

Benfica (Portugal)	1–1	(Italy) Roma
Filipović 19'	Report	Falcão 85'

Estádio da Luz, Lisbon
Attendance: 69,000
Referee: Károly Palotai (Hungary)

Benfica won 3–2 on aggregate.

== Semi-finals ==
Team 1	Agg.	Team 2	1st leg	2nd leg
Bohemians (Czechoslovakia)	1–4	(Belgium) Anderlecht	0–1	1–3
Benfica (Portugal)	1–1 (a)	(Romania) Universitatea Craiova	0–0	1–1

=== First leg ===
6 April 1983
17:00

Bohemians (Czechoslovakia)	0–1	(Belgium) Anderlecht
	Report	Vandenbergh 30'

Ďolíček, Prague
Attendance: 18,000
Referee: Walter Eschweiler (West Germany)

6 April 1983
22:00

Benfica (Portugal)	0–0	(Romania) Universitatea Craiova
	Report

Estádio da Luz, Lisbon
Attendance: 62,500
Referee: Erik Fredriksson (Sweden)

=== Second leg ===
20 April 1983
15:00

Universitatea Craiova (Romania)	1–1	(Portugal) Benfica
Balaci 17'	Report	Filipović 53'

Stadionul Central, Craiova
Attendance: 50,000
Referee: Bob Valentine (Scotland)

1–1 on aggregate; Benfica won on away goals.

20 April 1983
20:00

Anderlecht (Belgium)	3–1	(Czechoslovakia) Bohemians
Vandenbergh 38' (pen.); Brylle Larsen 40'; Czerniatynski 89'	Report	Jakubec 53'

Heysel Stadium, Brussels
Attendance: 26,000
Referee: George Courtney (England)

Anderlecht won 4–1 on aggregate

== Final ==
=== First leg ===
4 May 1983
20:00

Anderlecht (Belgium)	1–0	(Portugal) Benfica
Brylle 30'	Report

Heysel Stadium, Brussels
Attendance: 52,694
Referee: Bogdan Dochev (Bulgaria)

=== Second leg ===
18 May 1983
21:00

Benfica (Portugal)	1–1	(Belgium) Anderlecht
Shéu 32'	Report	Lozano 38'

Estádio da Luz, Lisbon
Attendance: 70,000
Referee: Charles Corver (Netherlands)

Anderlecht won 2–1 on aggregate.

== Top goalscorers ==
Rank	Name	Team	Goals
1	(Socialist Federal Republic of Yugoslavia) Zoran Filipović	(Portugal) Benfica	8
2	(Belgium) Erwin Vandenbergh	(Belgium) Anderlecht	7
3	(France) Alain Giresse	(France) Bordeaux	6
4	(Socialist Federal Republic of Yugoslavia) Husref Musemić	(Socialist Federal Republic of Yugoslavia) Sarajevo	5
4	(Denmark) Kenneth Brylle Larsen	(Belgium) Anderlecht	5
4	(West Germany) Klaus Allofs	(West Germany) Köln	5
4	(West Germany) Norbert Meier	(West Germany) Werder Bremen	5
4	(West Germany) Rudi Völler	(West Germany) Werder Bremen	5
4	(Switzerland) Michel Decastel	(Switzerland) Servette	5
4	(West Germany) Hans-Peter Briegel	(West Germany) Kaiserslautern	5
4	(Portugal) Nené	(Portugal) Benfica	5
4	(Spain) Juan Lozano	(Belgium) Anderlecht	5
