= 1986 Allsvenskan =

62nd season of Allsvenskan

Allsvenskan
- Season: 1986
- Champions: Malmö FF (Allsvenskan champions and Swedish champions after play-offs)
- Relegated: Kalmar FF; Djurgårdens IF
- European Cup: Malmö FF
- UEFA Cup: IFK Göteborg; AIK
- Top goalscorer: Johnny Ekström, IFK Göteborg (13)
- Average attendance: 5,074

Statistics of Allsvenskan in season 1986.

== Overview ==
The league was contested by 12 teams, with Malmö FF winning the league and the Swedish championship after the play-offs.

== League table ==
Pos	Team	Pld	W	D	L	GF	GA	GD	Pts	Qualification or relegation
1	Malmö FF (C, S)	22	16	5	1	49	11	+38	37	Allsvenskan play-offs, Qualification to European Cup first round
2	IFK Göteborg	22	13	5	4	44	17	+27	31	Allsvenskan play-offs, Qualification to UEFA Cup first round
3	AIK	22	9	7	6	29	21	+8	25	Allsvenskan play-offs, Qualification to UEFA Cup first round
4	IFK Norrköping	22	9	3	10	30	30	0	21	Allsvenskan play-offs
5	Halmstads BK	22	8	5	9	25	32	−7	21	
6	Hammarby IF	22	8	4	10	31	38	−7	20	
7	Östers IF	22	6	8	8	20	28	−8	20	
8	IK Brage	22	8	4	10	19	27	−8	20	
9	Örgryte IS	22	7	5	10	33	35	−2	19	
10	IF Elfsborg	22	5	8	9	19	26	−7	18	
11	Kalmar FF (R)	22	5	7	10	22	36	−14	17	Relegation to Division 1, Qualification to Cup Winners' Cup first round (Note: Kalmar FF qualified for the European Cup Winners' Cup as Svenska Cupen champions 1986–87.)
12	Djurgårdens IF (R)	22	7	1	14	23	43	−20	15	Relegation to Division 1

Rules for classification: 1) points; 2) goal difference; 3) number of goals scored.
(C) Allsvenskan Champion; (S) Swedish Champion; (R) Relegated

== Results ==
Home \ Away	AIK	DIF	HBK	HIF	IFE	IFKG	IFKN	IKB	KFF	MFF	ÖIS	ÖIF
AIK		3–2	1–1	0–1	2–0	2–1	1–1	3–0	0–0	2–5	0–2	0–0
Djurgårdens IF	0–2		0–0	1–3	3–0	0–4	3–1	0–1	2–1	0–3	3–4	3–1
Halmstads BK	0–2	1–0		1–0	2–0	0–4	4–2	1–2	4–1	2–2	2–0	3–1
Hammarby IF	0–4	0–2	3–0		0–2	1–1	2–2	1–0	5–1	0–1	4–3	1–1
IF Elfsborg	0–1	4–0	1–1	2–4		0–3	1–0	0–1	2–2	0–0	1–2	3–0
IFK Göteborg	2–0	3–0	4–0	3–1	1–1		2–1	1–1	3–0	0–1	4–1	1–2
IFK Norrköping	0–0	4–0	2–1	2–1	4–0	2–0		2–0	0–1	0–4	1–0	3–1
IK Brage	0–0	0–1	2–1	3–1	0–2	1–2	0–1		2–0	2–1	1–1	2–1
Kalmar FF	1–5	3–1	0–0	0–3	0–0	0–1	2–1	4–0		0–0	3–3	1–1
Malmö FF	3–0	2–0	2–0	5–0	0–0	1–1	3–0	2–1	1–0		3–1	4–1
Örgryte IS	1–1	0–1	3–0	4–0	0–0	0–1	3–1	2–0	1–2	1–4		0–2
Östers IF	1–0	3–1	0–1	0–0	0–0	2–2	1–0	0–0	1–0	0–2	1–1	

Legend: Blue = home team win; Yellow = draw; Red = away team win.

== Allsvenskan play-offs ==
The 1986 Allsvenskan play-offs was the fifth edition of the competition. The four best placed teams from Allsvenskan qualified to the competition. Allsvenskan champions Malmö FF won the competition and the Swedish championship after defeating AIK who finished third in the league.

=== Semi-finals ===
==== First leg ====
15 October 1986	IFK Norrköping	2–2	Malmö FF	Idrottsparken, Norrköping

15 October 1986	AIK	0–0	IFK Göteborg	Råsunda, Solna

==== Second leg ====
18 October 1986	Malmö FF	(ag) 0–0 (2–2 agg.)	IFK Norrköping	Malmö Stadion, Malmö

18 October 1986	IFK Göteborg	1–1 (ag) (1–1 agg.)	AIK	Ullevi, Gothenburg

=== Final ===
26 October 1986	AIK	1–0	Malmö FF	Råsunda, Solna

1 November 1986	Malmö FF	5–2 (5–3 agg.)	AIK	Malmö Stadion, Malmö

== Season statistics ==
=== Top scorers ===
Rank	Player	Club	Goals
1	(Sweden) Johnny Ekström	IFK Göteborg	13
2	(Sweden) Peter Karlsson	Kalmar FF	10
3	(Sweden) Lars Larsson	Malmö FF	9
3	(Sweden) Ulf Eriksson	Hammarby IF	9
3	(Sweden) Peter Gerhardsson	Hammarby IF	9
3	(Sweden) Torbjörn Nilsson	IFK Göteborg	9
7	(Sweden) Rhonny Nilsson	IK Brage	8
8	(Sweden) Anders Palmér	Malmö FF	7
8	(Sweden) Jan Hellström	Örgryte IS	7
8	(Sweden) Björn Nilsson	Malmö FF	7
8	(Sweden) Göran Holter	IFK Norrköping	7
8	(Sweden) Per Olsson	Halmstads BK	7
8	(Sweden) Leif Engkvist	Malmö FF	7

== Attendances ==
#	Club	Average	Highest
1	IFK Göteborg	7,822	19,926
2	Örgryte IS	6,112	32,822
3	Djurgårdens IF	5,862	14,424
4	Malmö FF	5,798	13,349
5	AIK	5,438	12,676
6	Hammarby IF	5,310	12,413
7	IFK Norrköping	4,718	7,208
8	IF Elfsborg	4,492	9,340
9	IK Brage	4,220	6,478
10	Halmstads BK	3,034	4,902
11	Östers IF	2,937	5,790
12	Kalmar FF	2,676	5,676
