= 1987 Allsvenskan =

63rd season of Allsvenskan

Allsvenskan
- Season: 1987
- Champions: Malmö FF (Allsvenskan champions); IFK Göteborg (Swedish champions after play-offs)
- Relegated: Halmstads BK; IF Elfsborg
- European Cup: IFK Göteborg
- UEFA Cup: Malmö FF; Östers IF; IK Brage
- Top goalscorer: Lars Larsson, Malmö FF (19)
- Average attendance: 4,504

Statistics of Allsvenskan in season 1987.

== Overview ==
Allsvenskan 1987 was played between 12 April and 4 October 1987 and was won by Malmö FF. The championship play-off finals were played from 10 to 31 October 1987 and was won by IFK Göteborg, who defeated Malmö FF in the final and thus became Swedish champions.

== League table ==
| Pos | Team | Pld | W | D | L | GF | GA | GD | Pts | Qualification or relegation |
|---|---|---|---|---|---|---|---|---|---|---|
| 1 | Malmö FF (C) | 22 | 14 | 6 | 2 | 50 | 21 | +29 | 34 | Allsvenskan play-offs, Qualification to UEFA Cup first round |
| 2 | IFK Norrköping | 22 | 11 | 7 | 4 | 33 | 19 | +14 | 29 | Allsvenskan play-offs, Qualification to Cup Winners' Cup first round (Note: IFK Norrköping qualified for the European Cup Winners' Cup as Svenska Cupen champions 1987–88.) |
| 3 | IFK Göteborg (S) | 22 | 9 | 8 | 5 | 39 | 24 | +15 | 26 | Allsvenskan play-offs, Qualification to European Cup first round |
| 4 | Östers IF | 22 | 10 | 4 | 8 | 25 | 26 | −1 | 24 | Allsvenskan play-offs, Qualification to UEFA Cup first round |
| 5 | IK Brage | 22 | 7 | 10 | 5 | 21 | 23 | −2 | 24 | Qualification to UEFA Cup first round |
| 6 | Hammarby IF | 22 | 6 | 10 | 6 | 37 | 27 | +10 | 22 | |
| 7 | Västra Frölunda | 22 | 6 | 9 | 7 | 21 | 29 | −8 | 21 | |
| 8 | Örgryte IS | 22 | 5 | 10 | 7 | 32 | 33 | −1 | 20 | |
| 9 | AIK | 22 | 5 | 10 | 7 | 15 | 17 | −2 | 20 | |
| 10 | GIF Sundsvall | 22 | 4 | 9 | 9 | 25 | 31 | −6 | 17 | |
| 11 | Halmstads BK (R) | 22 | 4 | 9 | 9 | 22 | 39 | −17 | 17 | Relegation to Division 1 |
| 12 | IF Elfsborg (R) | 22 | 3 | 4 | 15 | 18 | 49 | −31 | 10 | Relegation to Division 1 |

Rules for classification: 1) points; 2) goal difference; 3) number of goals scored.
(C) Allsvenskan Champion; (S) Swedish Champion; (R) Relegated

== Results ==
| Home \ Away | AIK | GIF | HBK | HIF | IFE | IFKG | IFKN | IKB | MFF | VF | ÖIS | ÖIF |
|---|---|---|---|---|---|---|---|---|---|---|---|---|
| AIK | | 0–0 | 3–0 | 1–1 | 2–0 | 1–2 | 0–0 | 0–0 | 1–1 | 2–3 | 1–0 | 0–1 |
| GIF Sundsvall | 0–1 | | 1–1 | 0–2 | 1–1 | 0–0 | 1–2 | 2–0 | 1–4 | 2–0 | 2–4 | 0–1 |
| Halmstads BK | 0–0 | 0–0 | | 0–0 | 4–1 | 1–1 | 1–2 | 4–0 | 2–2 | 1–0 | 0–0 | 2–1 |
| Hammarby IF | 1–1 | 2–3 | 6–0 | | 2–3 | 0–0 | 2–1 | 0–1 | 2–2 | 3–0 | 0–0 | 4–3 |
| IF Elfsborg | 1–0 | 2–6 | 1–1 | 0–0 | | 3–1 | 1–2 | 1–2 | 1–2 | 1–2 | 0–5 | 1–1 |
| IFK Göteborg | 1–1 | 1–1 | 3–0 | 3–2 | 2–0 | | 3–2 | 2–3 | 1–2 | 6–1 | 1–2 | 0–0 |
| IFK Norrköping | 2–0 | 1–1 | 2–0 | 4–2 | 3–0 | 0–0 | | 0–0 | 0–3 | 2–0 | 3–1 | 3–0 |
| IK Brage | 0–0 | 3–1 | 1–1 | 1–1 | 2–0 | 0–2 | 1–1 | | 0–3 | 1–1 | 4–0 | 1–0 |
| Malmö FF | 0–1 | 3–1 | 3–1 | 2–0 | 3–0 | 2–1 | 2–0 | 3–0 | | 2–2 | 2–2 | 0–0 |
| Västra Frölunda | 1–0 | 1–1 | 1–0 | 1–1 | 4–1 | 2–2 | 0–0 | 0–0 | 0–1 | | 1–1 | 0–2 |
| Örgryte IS | 0–0 | 1–1 | 7–3 | 0–0 | 3–0 | 1–4 | 1–1 | 0–0 | 3–7 | 0–0 | | 1–2 |
| Östers IF | 3–0 | 1–0 | 4–0 | 1–6 | 1–0 | 0–3 | 0–2 | 1–1 | 2–1 | 0–1 | 1–0 | |

Legend: Blue = home team win; Yellow = draw; Red = away team win.

== Allsvenskan play-offs ==
The 1987 Allsvenskan play-offs was the sixth edition of the competition. The four best placed teams from Allsvenskan qualified to the competition. IFK Göteborg who finished third in the league won the competition and the Swedish championship after defeating Allsvenskan champions Malmö FF.

=== Semi-finals ===
==== First leg ====
| 10 October 1987 | Öster | 1–2 | Malmö FF | Värendsvallen, Växjö |

| 10 October 1987 | IFK Göteborg | 3–0 | IFK Norrköping | Ullevi, Gothenburg |

==== Second leg ====
| 17 October 1987 | Malmö FF | 2–1 (4–2 agg.) | Öster | Malmö Stadion, Malmö |

| 17 October 1987 | IFK Norrköping | 2–2 (2–5 agg.) | IFK Göteborg | Idrottsparken, Norrköping |

=== Final ===
| 24 October 1987 | IFK Göteborg | 1–0 | Malmö FF | Ullevi, Gothenburg |

| 31 October 1987 | Malmö FF | 2–1 (ag) (2–2 agg.) | IFK Göteborg | Malmö Stadion, Malmö |

== Season statistics ==
=== Top scorers ===
| Rank | Player | Club | Goals |
|---|---|---|---|
| 1 | (Sweden) Lars Larsson | Malmö FF | 19 |
| 2 | (Sweden) Mats Magnusson | Malmö FF | 12 |
| 2 | (Sweden) Thomas Lundin | Hammarby IF | 12 |
| 4 | (Sweden) Stefan Pettersson | IFK Göteborg | 10 |
| 5 | (Sweden) Peter Karlsson | Örgryte IS | 9 |
| 5 | (Sweden) Lennart Nilsson | IFK Göteborg | 9 |
| 7 | (Sweden) Göran Holter | IFK Norrköping | 8 |
| 7 | (Sweden) Peter Truedsson | Östers IF | 8 |
| 7 | (Sweden) Ulf Köhl | IF Elfsborg | 8 |
| 7 | (Sweden) Anders Erlandsson | IK Brage | 8 |

== Attendances ==
| # | Club | Average | Highest |
|---|---|---|---|
| 1 | IFK Göteborg | 6,911 | 16,470 |
| 2 | Malmö FF | 5,681 | 19,226 |
| 3 | IFK Norrköping | 5,191 | 10,935 |
| 4 | GIF Sundsvall | 4,578 | 11,437 |
| 5 | AIK | 4,433 | 11,626 |
| 6 | Örgryte IS | 4,279 | 15,298 |
| 7 | Hammarby IF | 3,978 | 6,745 |
| 8 | IK Brage | 3,704 | 6,454 |
| 9 | Halmstads BK | 3,447 | 8,938 |
| 10 | Östers IF | 3,187 | 5,767 |
| 11 | IF Elfsborg | 2,800 | 3,889 |
| 12 | Västra Frölunda IF | 2,445 | 7,965 |
