= 1983 UEFA Cup final =

- First leg matchday program
- Event: 1982–83 UEFA Cup
Anderlecht	Benfica
(Belgium)	(Portugal)
2	1
- on aggregate

First leg
Anderlecht	Benfica
1	0
- Date: 4 May 1983
- Venue: Heysel Stadium, Brussels
- Referee: Bogdan Dochev (Bulgaria)
- Attendance: 52,694

Second leg
Benfica	Anderlecht
1	1
- Date: 18 May 1983
- Venue: Estádio da Luz, Lisbon
- Referee: Charles Corver (Netherlands)
- Attendance: 80,000

The 1983 UEFA Cup Final was played on 4 May 1983 and 18 May 1983 between Anderlecht of Belgium and Benfica of Portugal. Anderlecht won 2–1 on aggregate.

Because of the construction of their new stadium, Anderlecht played their home games in the Heysel stadium in 1983, which included the first leg of the UEFA Cup final. After half an hour, Frank Vercauteren was able to provide a cross, which Kenneth Brylle headed in. Anderlecht travelled to Lisbon with the smallest lead.

Benfica started the return match with a series of chances. This resulted in a goal by Shéu in the 32nd minute. Only 6 minutes later, the technically skilled Juan Lozano restored the balance on a pass from Franky Vercauteren. In front of 80,000 spectators, Anderlecht was able to hold out, winning its fifth and so far last European title.

== Route to the final ==
(Belgium) Anderlecht				Round	(Portugal) Benfica			
Opponent	Agg.	1st leg	2nd leg		Opponent	Agg.	1st leg	2nd leg
(Finland) KPT Kuopio	6–1	3–0 (H)	3–1 (A)	First round	(Spain) Real Betis	4–2	2–1 (H)	2–1 (A)
(Portugal) Porto	6–3	4–0 (H)	2–3 (A)	Second round	(Belgium) Sporting Lokeren	4–1	2–0 (H)	2–1 (A)
(Socialist Federal Republic of Yugoslavia) FK Sarajevo	6–2	6–1 (H)	0–1 (A)	Third round	(Switzerland) FC Zürich	5–1	1–1 (A)	4–0 (H)
(Spain) Valencia	5–2	2–1 (A)	3–1 (H)	Quarter-finals	(Italy) Roma	3–2	2–1 (A)	1–1 (H)
(Czechoslovakia) Bohemians Praha	4–1	1–0 (A)	3–1 (H)	Semi-finals	(Romania) Universitatea Craiova	1–1 (a)	0–0 (H)	1–1 (A)

== Match details ==
=== First leg ===
4 May 1983

Anderlecht (Belgium)	1–0	(Portugal) Benfica
Brylle 29'	Report Overview (archive) Overview

Heysel Stadium, Brussels
Attendance: 52,694
Referee: Bogdan Dochev (Bulgaria)

Anderlecht	Benfica

GK	1	(Belgium) Jacky Munaron
CB	2	(Socialist Federal Republic of Yugoslavia) Luka Peruzović
RM	3	(Denmark) Per Frimann
LM	4	(Spain) Juan Lozano
LB	5	(Belgium) Michel De Groote	Yellow card
CM	6	(Belgium) Franky Vercauteren (c)
CB	7	(Denmark) Morten Olsen
RB	8	(Netherlands) Wim Hofkens
CF	9	(Belgium) Erwin Vandenbergh		(substituted off) 78'
CM	10	(Belgium) Ludo Coeck
CF	11	(Denmark) Kenneth Brylle
Substitutes:
FW	16	(Belgium) Alex Czerniatynski		(substituted on) 78'
Manager:
(Belgium) Paul Van Himst

GK	1	(Portugal) Manuel Bento
RB	2	(Portugal) Minervino Pietra	Yellow card
CB	3	(Portugal) Humberto Coelho (c)
LB	4	(Portugal) Álvaro Magalhães
CB	5	(Portugal) Frederico Rosa		(substituted off) 78'
RM	6	(Portugal) Carlos Manuel
CF	7	(Portugal) Diamantino Miranda
CF	8	(Socialist Federal Republic of Yugoslavia) Zoran Filipović		(substituted off) 68'
CM	9	(Portugal) José Luís	(red card) 75'
LM	10	(Portugal) Fernando Chalana
CM	11	(Portugal) Shéu
Substitutes:
MF	16	(Portugal) Nené		(substituted on) 68'
MF	13	(Portugal) Bastos Lopes		(substituted on) 78'
Manager:
(Sweden) Sven-Göran Eriksson

=== Second leg ===
18 May 1983

Benfica (Portugal)	1–1	(Belgium) Anderlecht
Shéu 32'	Report Overview (archive) Overview	Lozano 38'

Estádio da Luz, Lisbon
Attendance: 80,000
Referee: Charles Corver (Netherlands)

Benfica	Anderlecht

GK	1	(Portugal) Manuel Bento
RB	2	(Portugal) Minervino Pietra
CB	3	(Portugal) Humberto Coelho (c)
LB	4	(Portugal) António Veloso	(substituted off) 62'
CB	5	(Portugal) Bastos Lopes
DM	6	(Portugal) Carlos Manuel
CF	7	(Portugal) Nené
CM	8	(Sweden) Glenn Strömberg
AM	9	(Portugal) Diamantino Miranda
CF	10	(Portugal) Fernando Chalana
CM	11	(Portugal) Shéu	(substituted off) 50'
Substitutes:
MF	16	(Socialist Federal Republic of Yugoslavia) Zoran Filipović	(substituted on) 50'
MF	15	(Portugal) João Alves	(substituted on) 62'
Manager:
(Sweden) Sven-Göran Eriksson

GK	1	(Belgium) Jacky Munaron
RB	2	(Socialist Federal Republic of Yugoslavia) Luka Peruzović
CM	3	(Denmark) Per Frimann
CM	4	(Spain) Juan Lozano
RM	5	(Belgium) Michel De Groote
CF	6	(Belgium) Franky Vercauteren (c)
LB	7	(Denmark) Morten Olsen
CB	8	(Belgium) Walter De Greef
CF	9	(Belgium) Erwin Vandenbergh	(substituted off) 78'
LM	10	(Belgium) Ludo Coeck
CB	11	(Belgium) Hugo Broos
Substitutes:
FW	14	(Denmark) Kenneth Brylle	(substituted on) 78'
Manager:
(Belgium) Paul Van Himst

== See also ==
- 1983 European Cup final
- 1983 European Cup Winners' Cup final
- S.L. Benfica in international football
- R.S.C. Anderlecht in European football
- 1982–83 S.L. Benfica season
