= Ron Murphy (disambiguation) =

Ron Murphy (1933–2014) was a Canadian hockey player

Ron or Ronald or Ronnie Murphy may also refer to:

- Ron Murphy (Canadian football) (1932–2020), Canadian football player
- Ron Murphy (director), Canadian director
- Ronnie Murphy (born 1964), American basketball player
- Ronnie Murphy (footballer) (born 1962), Irish footballer
- Ronald Murphy, architect of Spencer Engineering Building
- Ron Murphy, former band member of The Wynona Riders
