= 1988 Allsvenskan =

64th season of Allsvenskan

Allsvenskan
- Season: 1988
- Champions: Malmö FF (Allsvenskan champions and Swedish champions after play-offs)
- Relegated: Östers IF; Hammarby IF
- European Cup: Malmö FF
- UEFA Cup: Örgryte IS; IFK Göteborg
- Top goalscorer: Martin Dahlin, Malmö FF (17)
- Average attendance: 5,002

Statistics of Allsvenskan in season 1988.

== Overview ==
The league was contested by 12 teams, with Malmö FF winning the league and the Swedish championship after the play-offs.

== League table ==
Pos	Team	Pld	W	D	L	GF	GA	GD	Pts	Qualification or relegation
1	Malmö FF (C, S)	22	15	2	5	45	26	+19	32	Allsvenskan play-offs, Qualification to European Cup first round
2	IFK Göteborg	22	13	5	4	37	18	+19	31	Allsvenskan play-offs, Qualification to UEFA Cup first round
3	Djurgårdens IF	22	9	9	4	38	22	+16	27	Allsvenskan play-offs, Qualification to Cup Winners' Cup first round (Note: Djurgården qualified for the European Cup Winners' Cup as Svenska Cupen runners-up 1988–89.)
4	Örgryte IS	22	9	5	8	27	23	+4	23	Allsvenskan play-offs, Qualification to UEFA Cup first round
5	GIF Sundsvall	22	8	7	7	26	26	0	23	
6	IFK Norrköping	22	9	3	10	39	29	+10	21	
7	IK Brage	22	7	7	8	23	30	−7	21	
8	GAIS	22	8	4	10	25	31	−6	20	
9	Västra Frölunda	22	6	6	10	24	34	−10	18	
10	AIK	22	6	6	10	19	30	−11	18	
11	Östers IF (R)	22	4	9	9	20	33	−13	17	Relegation to Division 1
12	Hammarby IF (R)	22	5	3	14	19	40	−21	13	Relegation to Division 1

Rules for classification: 1) points; 2) goal difference; 3) number of goals scored.
(C) Allsvenskan Champion; (S) Swedish Champion; (R) Relegated

== Results ==
Home \ Away	AIK	DIF	GAIS	GIF	HIF	IFKG	IFKN	IKB	MFF	VF	ÖIS	ÖIF
AIK		0–0	0–0	1–2	0–0	1–2	2–0	2–2	1–5	4–2	2–0	0–0
Djurgårdens IF	0–0		6–1	4–2	2–0	0–1	0–3	0–0	2–3	4–2	1–1	2–2
GAIS	1–0	1–2		1–1	2–0	0–1	2–3	2–1	3–2	2–0	1–3	1–0
GIF Sundsvall	2–0	0–2	1–1		2–1	1–0	2–2	1–1	2–3	0–0	0–1	0–1
Hammarby IF	1–2	0–4	1–2	3–0		2–1	0–0	2–0	2–1	1–2	0–1	3–0
IFK Göteborg	3–1	1–1	2–0	0–1	5–1		2–1	3–0	1–3	1–1	2–1	1–1
IFK Norrköping	0–1	1–2	3–2	0–1	6–0	1–3		3–0	3–1	0–1	3–0	3–0
IK Brage	2–1	1–1	1–0	2–0	1–0	0–3	3–1		2–1	1–1	1–1	4–1
Malmö FF	2–0	2–2	2–0	1–1	2–0	1–3	2–1	2–0		2–0	3–2	2–1
Västra Frölunda	3–0	0–3	0–2	1–1	3–1	0–0	2–3	1–0	0–2		0–1	3–3
Örgryte IS	0–1	1–0	1–1	1–2	3–0	1–1	2–1	3–0	0–1	2–0		1–2
Östers IF	3–0	0–0	1–0	0–4	1–1	0–1	1–1	1–1	0–2	1–2	1–1	

Legend: Blue = home team win; Yellow = draw; Red = away team win.

== Allsvenskan play-offs ==
The 1988 Allsvenskan play-offs was the seventh edition of the competition. The four best placed teams from Allsvenskan qualified to the competition. Allsvenskan champions Malmö FF won the competition and the Swedish championship after defeating Djurgården who finished third in the league.

=== Semi-finals ===
==== First leg ====
30 October 1988	Örgryte	0–1	Malmö FF	Ullevi, Gothenburg

30 October 1988	Djurgården	2–0	IFK Göteborg	Stockholms Stadion, Stockholm

==== Second leg ====
12 November 1988	Malmö FF	2–1 (3–1 agg.)	Örgryte	Malmö Stadion, Malmö

12 November 1988	IFK Göteborg	1–0 (1–2 agg.)	Djurgården	Ullevi, Gothenburg

=== Final ===
16 November 1988	Djurgården	0–0	Malmö FF	Stockholms Stadion, Stockholm

19 November 1988	Malmö FF	7–3 (7–3 agg.)	Djurgården	Malmö Stadion, Malmö
	Lindman 1', 9'; Ljung 26'; Dahlin 31', 34', 60', 78'		Osvold 23'; Fjellström 47'; Galloway 84'

== Season statistics ==
=== Top scorers ===
Rank	Player	Club	Goals
1	(Sweden) Martin Dahlin	Malmö FF	17
2	(Sweden) Peter Karlsson	Örgryte IS	14
2	(Sweden) Jan Hellström	IFK Norrköping	14
4	(Sweden) Hans Eklund	Östers IF	10
4	(Tunisia) Samir Bakaou	GAIS	10
4	(England) Steve Galloway	Djurgårdens IF	10
4	(Sweden) Thomas Johansson	AIK	10
8	(Sweden) Håkan Lindman	Malmö FF	9
9	(Sweden) Thomas Lundin	Hammarby IF	8
9	(Sweden) Göran Holter	IFK Norrköping	8
9	(Sweden) Stefan Rehn	Djurgårdens IF	8

== Attendances ==
#	Club	Average	Highest
1	IFK Göteborg	7,857	19,265
2	GAIS	6,814	18,286
3	Djurgårdens IF	6,034	13,410
4	GIF Sundsvall	5,948	9,608
5	Malmö FF	5,285	7,728
6	AIK	5,087	16,869
7	Hammarby IF	4,549	7,758
8	Örgryte IS	4,420	12,286
9	IFK Norrköping	4,311	6,205
10	IK Brage	3,853	4,561
11	Östers IF	3,248	6,812
12	Västra Frölunda IF	2,054	4,140
