= 1981–82 DDR-Oberliga =

DDR-Oberliga
- Season: 1981–82
- Champions: BFC Dynamo
- Relegated: BSG Energie Cottbus; BSG Chemie Buna Schkopau
- European Cup: BFC Dynamo
- European Cup Winners' Cup: Dynamo Dresden
- UEFA Cup: 1. FC Lokomotive Leipzig; FC Vorwärts Frankfurt; FC Carl Zeiss Jena
- Matches: 182
- Goals: 600 (3.3 per match)
- Top goalscorer: Rüdiger Schnuphase (19)
- Total attendance: 2,084,000
- Average attendance: 11,450

The 1981–82 DDR-Oberliga was the 33rd season of the DDR-Oberliga, the first tier of league football in East Germany.

The league was contested by fourteen teams. BFC Dynamo won the championship, the club's fourth of ten consecutive East German championships from 1978 to 1988.

Rüdiger Schnuphase of FC Carl Zeiss Jena was the league's top scorer with 19 goals, with Schnuphase also taking out the seasons East German Footballer of the year award.

On the strength of the 1981–82 title BFC Dynamo qualified for the 1982–83 European Cup where the club was knocked out in an East-West German encounter by Hamburger SV in the first round. Second-placed club Dynamo Dresden qualified for the 1982–83 European Cup Winners' Cup as the seasons FDGB-Pokal winners and lost to Boldklubben af 1893 in the first round. Third-placed 1. FC Lokomotive Leipzig qualified for the 1982–83 UEFA Cup where it was knocked out by Viking F.K. while fourth-placed FC Vorwärts Frankfurt lost to SV Werder Bremen and fifth-placed FC Carl Zeiss Jena was eliminated by Girondins de Bordeaux, all in the first round.

== Table ==
The 1981–82 season saw two newly promoted clubs, BSG Energie Cottbus and BSG Chemie Buna Schkopau.

Pos	Team	Pld	W	D	L	GF	GA	GD	Pts	Qualification or relegation
1	Berliner FC Dynamo (C)	26	18	5	3	74	27	+47	41	Qualification to European Cup first round
2	SG Dynamo Dresden	26	15	4	7	50	24	+26	34	Qualification to Cup Winners' Cup first round
3	1. FC Lokomotive Leipzig	26	13	7	6	53	29	+24	33	Qualification to UEFA Cup first round
4	FC Vorwärts Frankfurt	26	14	5	7	56	39	+17	33	Qualification to UEFA Cup first round
5	FC Carl Zeiss Jena	26	14	4	8	49	27	+22	32	Qualification to UEFA Cup first round
6	1. FC Magdeburg	26	13	6	7	49	42	+7	32	
7	FC Rot-Weiss Erfurt	26	10	8	8	55	44	+11	28	
8	F.C. Hansa Rostock	26	9	7	10	37	40	−3	25	
9	FC Karl-Marx-Stadt	26	9	6	11	50	38	+12	24	
10	BSG Wismut Aue	26	8	7	11	33	48	−15	23	
11	Hallescher FC Chemie	26	8	7	11	28	46	−18	23	
12	BSG Sachsenring Zwickau	26	4	6	16	24	57	−33	14	
13	BSG Energie Cottbus (R)	26	3	5	18	21	62	−41	11	Relegation to DDR-Liga
14	BSG Chemie Buna Schkopau (R)	26	3	5	18	21	77	−56	11	Relegation to DDR-Liga

(C) Champions; (R) Relegated

== Results ==
Home \ Away	BFC	CZJ	CBS	DRE	ECO	HFC	HRO	KMS	LOK	MAG	RWE	VFO	SZW	AUE
BFC Dynamo		3–1	7–0	2–1	7–2	5–1	1–0	4–2	1–1	4–0	4–2	6–0	3–0	5–0
Carl Zeiss Jena	1–2		1–0	2–1	3–0	1–2	5–0	2–1	3–0	1–0	2–2	2–0	6–0	4–0
Chemie Buna Schkopau	0–1	0–3		0–1	3–1	0–3	1–0	1–1	1–4	0–3	1–4	1–2	0–3	1–2
Dynamo Dresden	2–1	0–1	10–1		4–0	1–0	3–0	3–1	2–1	5–0	1–0	1–0	4–0	1–2
Energie Cottbus	1–2	0–0	0–0	0–0		2–0	0–1	0–2	1–4	1–1	0–5	4–3	0–1	3–2
Hallescher FC Chemie	2–2	2–1	1–1	0–0	2–1		4–2	1–2	1–1	2–2	2–0	0–2	1–0	3–0
Hansa Rostock	1–1	2–0	5–1	0–0	2–1	2–0		3–1	0–1	1–1	1–1	1–2	4–2	2–2
Karl-Marx-Stadt	1–3	2–2	6–0	1–1	3–0	4–0	2–4		1–2	5–0	3–1	1–1	3–0	0–0
1. FC Lokomotive Leipzig	0–0	2–2	3–0	1–2	4–0	8–0	0–1	2–0		3–2	3–1	2–1	3–0	2–2
1. FC Magdeburg	2–1	1–0	2–2	4–0	3–0	3–0	3–2	2–1	1–2		4–1	2–1	2–1	3–1
Rot-Weiß Erfurt	3–1	1–0	1–1	4–0	2–2	0–0	4–0	2–2	4–3	4–2		1–4	5–2	4–1
Vorwärts Frankfurt (Oder)	3–3	5–3	6–0	2–1	5–2	2–0	3–2	1–0	1–1	2–2	2–0		2–0	3–0
Sachsenring Zwickau	1–4	1–2	3–4	0–3	2–0	0–0	0–0	0–3	0–0	0–2	3–3	2–2		2–0
Wismut Aue	0–1	0–1	4–2	1–3	1–0	4–1	1–1	3–2	2–0	2–2	0–0	2–1	1–1	

Legend: Blue = home team win; Yellow = draw; Red = away team win.
