= Michel De Groote =

Belgian footballer

Personal information
- Full name: Michel De Groote
- Date of birth: 18 October 1955 (age 71)
- Place of birth: Watermael-Boitsfort, Belgium
- Height: 1.74 m (5 ft 9 in)
- Position: Left back

Senior career*
Years	Team	Apps	(Gls)
1975–1977	RSC Anderlecht	40	(4)
1977–1979	RFC de Liège	14	(2)
1979–1989	RSC Anderlecht	254	(23)
1989–1992	KAA Gent	79	(0)
1992–1993	KFC Avenir Lembeek	?	(?)

International career^{‡}
1978–1989	Belgium	4	(0)
- * Club domestic league appearances and goals as of 16 October 2009 ‡ National team caps and goals as of 16 October 2009

Michel De Groote (born 18 October 1955) is a Belgian retired football defender. During his club career, De Groote played for RSC Anderlecht, RFC de Liège, KAA Gent and KFC Avenir Lembeek. He also gained 4 caps for the Belgium national team.

== Honours ==
=== Player ===
Anderlecht

- Belgian First Division: 1980–81, 1984–85, 1985–86, 1986–87
- Belgian Cup: 1975–76, 1987–88, 1988–89
- Belgian Super Cup: 1985, 1987
- European Cup Winners' Cup: 1975–76 (winners), 1976–77 (runners-up)
- European Super Cup: 1976
- UEFA Cup: 1982–83 (winners), 1983–84 (runners-up)
- Amsterdam Tournament: 1976
- Jules Pappaert Cup: 1977, 1983, 1985
- Bruges Matins: 1985, 1988
