= Lasse Larsson =

Swedish footballer

Personal information
- Full name: Lars Arne Mikael Larsson
- Date of birth: 16 March 1962
- Place of birth: Trelleborg, Sweden
- Date of death: 8 March 2015 (aged 52)
- Position: Striker

Senior career*
Years	Team	Apps	(Gls)
1979−1981	IFK Trelleborg	49	(35)
1982−1984	Malmö FF	34	(16)
1984−1985	Atalanta	4	(0)
1985−1991	Malmö FF	63	(36)
1992−1993	Trelleborgs FF	2	(0)
Total		120	(87)

International career
1979	Sweden U18	3	(0)
1982–1987	Sweden U21	10	(9)
1984−1987	Sweden	9	(1)

Managerial career
- 1994−1995: Tomelilla IF
- 1996−1998: Malmö FF (Assistant manager)
- 1999−2001: Trelleborgs FF (Youth)
- Trelleborgs FF (Assistant manager)
- * Club domestic league appearances and goals

Lars "Lasse" Arne Mikael Larsson (16 March 1962 – 8 March 2015) was a Swedish footballer who played as a striker. He represented IFK Trelleborg, Malmö FF, and Atalanta during a career that spanned between 1979 and 1993. A full international between 1984 and 1987, he won nine caps and scored one goal for the Sweden national team. He was the 1987 Allsvenskan top scorer.

== Career ==
Larsson started his career in native Trelleborg at IFK Trelleborg. He later moved to Malmö FF where he enjoyed the most success of his career. He went on to play for Atalanta Bergamo in 1984 but missed the majority of the 1984-85 season due to injury which also made him return to Malmö after having only played four matches in Serie A. Back in Malmö Larsson was successful again and won a Swedish championship in 1986 and became Allsvenskan top scorer in 1987. After a very brief tenure in Trelleborgs FF again due to injury Larsson ended his career and started a coaching career. He died at the age of 52 in 2015.

== Honours ==
Malmö FF

- Swedish Champion: 1986, 1988

Individual

- Allsvenskan top scorer: 1986
