= Zoran Filipović =

Montenegrin footballer (born 1953)

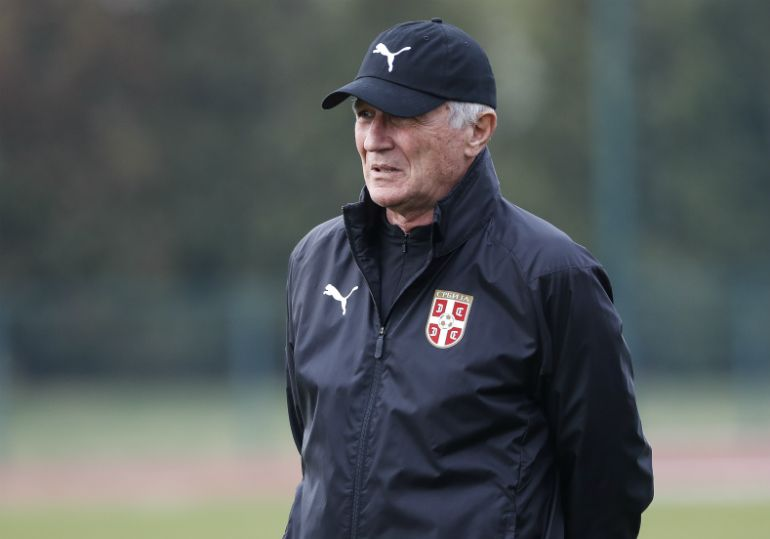

Personal information
- Date of birth: 6 February 1953 (age 73)
- Place of birth: Titograd, PR Montenegro, FPR Yugoslavia
- Height: 1.83 m (6 ft 0 in)
- Position: Striker

Youth career
- –1967: Budućnost Titograd
- 1967–1970: Red Star Belgrade

Senior career*
Years	Team	Apps	(Gls)
1970–1980	Red Star Belgrade	212	(88)
1980–1981	Club Brugge	21	(8)
1981–1984	Benfica	56	(26)
1984–1986	Boavista	49	(15)
Total		338	(137)

International career
1969–1970	Yugoslavia U20	6	(3)
1972–1973	Yugoslavia U21	2	(1)
1971–1977	Yugoslavia	13	(2)

Managerial career
- 1986–1988: Boavista (assistant)
- 1988–1993: Salgueiros
- 1993–1994: Beira-Mar
- 1994–1996: Benfica (assistant)
- 1995: Benfica (caretaker)
- 1997: Boavista
- 1997–1998: FR Yugoslavia (assistant)
- 1998: Vitoria Guimarães
- 1999: Sampdoria (assistant)
- 1999–2000: FR Yugoslavia (assistant)
- 2000: Panionios
- 2001–2003: Red Star Belgrade
- 2003–2004: Al-Shaab
- 2005–2007: Serbia and Montenegro/Serbia (technical director)
- 2007–2010: Montenegro
- 2010: Ceahlăul Piatra Neamț
- 2010–2011: Golden Arrows
- 2011–2012: Atyrau
- 2016–2020: Serbia (assistant coach and head scout)
- 2020–2021: Libya
- * Club domestic league appearances and goals

Zoran Filipović (Serbian Cyrillic: Зоран Филиповић, pronounced [zǒran filǐːpoʋitɕ, - fǐli-]; born 6 February 1953) is a Montenegrin former football coach and player, best known for his playing stints with Red Star Belgrade and S.L. Benfica.

== Club career ==
Filipović, born 6 February 1953, in Titograd, SR Montenegro, FPR Yugoslavia, made his name in Yugoslavia as a potent striker with Red Star Belgrade, during more than ten seasons at the club (5 June 1969 to 29 June 1980). He played a total of 520 games for the club scoring 302 goals. He was the Yugoslav First League top scorer in 1976–77 season with 21 goals. He also still holds the club record for most goals in European competitions – scoring 28 goals for Red Star in European Cup, Cup Winners' Cup and UEFA Cup.

His first stop abroad was a season at Club Brugge in Belgium, scoring eight goals in 21 league matches. In the summer of 1981, 28-year-old Filipović joined the reigning Portuguese champions S.L. Benfica where over the following three seasons he scored 28 goals in 54 league matches. Filipović also guided the club Benfica to the 1983 UEFA Cup Final against R.S.C. Anderlecht, being the top scorer of that season's competition and scoring memorable goals for the Portuguese in the quarterfinal against A.S. Roma and in the semifinal against Universitatea Craiova.

Filipović ended his career with Boavista FC (1984–1986) when he became the assistant coach at the same club.

== International career ==
Filipović made his debut for Yugoslavia in a May 1971 European Championship qualification match against East Germany in Leipzig, scoring a debut goal after only 11 minutes. He earned a total of 13 caps, scoring 2 goals and his final international was a November 1977 Balkan Cup match (0-0) against Greece in Thessaloniki.

== Managerial career ==
Filipović got his first head coaching job at S.C. Salgueiros in 1988 and stayed with the club for five seasons. He orchestrated the club's most notable moments in history by becoming Second League champion in 1989–90 and achieving UEFA Cup participation through best placement in club's history immediately in the next season.

In 1993, he moved to S.C. Beira-Mar where he coached for a season. In 1994, he returned to S.L. Benfica for a two-year spell where he was the assistant coach and interim head coach winning one Portuguese Cup in 1996, and participating in the UEFA Champions League. In 1997, he coached Boavista.

From mid-1990s, Filipović was on the FR Yugoslavia national team coaching staff as an assistant to head coach Slobodan Santrač. He was part of Yugoslav coaching staff at the World Cup 1998, leaving the post together with Santrač right after the tournament.

After joining as their head coach for a short spell, he left to work as part of Sampdoria coaching staff. Vujadin Boškov called him on to become his assistant during the second part of the 1998 season. Filipović's next stop was Vitória S.C. in the Portuguese league. However, he re-joined the FR Yugoslavia national team in 1999 continuing his collaboration with Vujadin Boškov when he took over. Filipović was the assistant at the Euro 2000. Following Euro 2000, he briefly coached Panionios in Greece.

In 2001, Filipović returned to coach Red Star Belgrade in Serbia until 2003 with which he won the 2001–02 FR Yugoslavia Cup title and is remembered for launching young players such as Nemanja Vidić, Boško Janković, Nikola Žigić, Aleksandar Luković amongst others. In 2003, Filipović went to the United Arab Emirates when coaching Al-Shaab with which he was defeated in the Cup finals.

After the Emirates experience, he became the technical director of the Football Association of Serbia and Montenegro A and U21 squads participating in the 2006 FIFA World Cup in Germany and the 2006 U21 European Championship in Portugal.

On 1 February 2007, he was appointed the first coach of the newly created Montenegro national team. His first game in charge was a friendly against Hungary on 24 March 2007 where they won their debut match with 2–1. The record in the newly formed Montenegro national team was more than positive for a team rated always as underdogs – of a total of 23 matches played, 8 victories were achieved, 8 draws and 7 defeats.

The FA president Dejan Savićević commented when Filipović's contract expired in January 2010 – "Filipović did an enormously good job. He formed a great group of players and worked with great enthusiasm." Filipović left the Balkan newcomers in an astonishing 73rd position in the FIFA ranking when he departed from this historical role. Only two months after leaving the helm of Montenegro national team he assumed a 3-month coaching job contract in Romanian club FC Ceahlăul Piatra Neamț.

In July 2010 he was hired by South African club Golden Arrows from Durban. With only three months left in the championship and with relegation imminent, Filipović arrived in FC Atyrau to save the team from relegation. He stayed on to sign a one-year contract for season 2012. In May 2016 it was announced by Serbia that Filipović will return to national team football in a new role.

After five years in the Serbia where significant achievements were attained, in December 2020 accepted a new challenge to become the national team coach of Libya. In May 2021, before the start of the qualifications for the 2021 FIFA Arab Cup in Qatar, he terminated his contract with the Libyan Football Federation (LFF) in FIFA with a just cause.

== Honours ==
=== Player ===
Red Star Belgrade

- Yugoslav First League: 1972–73, 1976–77, 1979–80
- Yugoslav Cup: 1970–71

Benfica

- Primeira Liga: 1982–83, 1983–84
- Taça de Portugal: 1982–83
- UEFA Cup: runner-up 1982–83

=== Manager ===
Benfica (as an assistant)

- Taça de Portugal: 1995–96

Salgueiros

- Portuguese Second Division: 1989–90

Red Star Belgrade

- FR Yugoslavia Cup: 2001–02

=== Individual ===
- Yugoslav First League top scorer: 1976–77
- UEFA Cup top scorer: 1982–83

== Trivia ==
Filipović still has the goal record in European competitions for Red Star Belgrade – 28 goals. Filipović is ranked the 3º Top goalscorer for Red Star – 502 games/302 goals. Filipović in season 1982–83 he contributed to Benfica's European good campaign – 12 games/8 goals (hat trick against AS Roma, and also the decisive goal against Universitatea Craiova).
