= Johnny Ekström =

Swedish footballer (born 1965)

Personal information
- Full name: Johnny Douglas Ekström
- Date of birth: 5 March 1965 (age 61)
- Place of birth: Gothenburg, Sweden
- Height: 1.88 m (6 ft 2 in)
- Positions: Striker; winger

Youth career
- –1983: IFK Göteborg

Senior career*
Years	Team	Apps	(Gls)
1983–1986	IFK Göteborg	42	(18)
1986–1988	Empoli	53	(8)
1988–1989	Bayern Munich	23	(7)
1989–1991	Cannes	32	(4)
1991–1993	IFK Göteborg	22	(8)
1993–1994	Reggiana	9	(1)
1994	→ Real Betis (loan)	7	(2)
1994–1995	Dynamo Dresden	30	(7)
1995–1997	Eintracht Frankfurt	34	(7)
1997–1998	IFK Göteborg	19	(3)
Total		289	(78)

International career
1984–1986	Sweden U21	12	(2)
1986–1995	Sweden	47	(13)
- * Club domestic league appearances and goals

Johnny Douglas Ekström (born 5 March 1965) is a Swedish former professional footballer who played as a forward and a winger. He played professionally in Italy, Germany, France, and Spain but is best remembered for his time in Sweden with IFK Göteborg with which he was the 1986 Allsvenskan top scorer and won three Swedish Championships. A full international between 1986 and 1995, he won 47 caps for the Sweden national team and represented his country at the 1990 FIFA World Cup and UEFA Euro 1992.

== Club career ==
=== IFK Göteborg ===
A product of the IFK Göteborg youth academy, Ekström was promoted to the first team in 1983 before making his Allsvenskan debut during the 1984 season. He quickly earned the nicknames "Kallebäcks-Expressen" (the express train from Kallebäck) and "Johnny Bråttom" (Johnny-in-a-hurry) due to his speed on the football pitch. His most successful season with Göteborg came in 1986, when he was the 1986 Allsvenskan top scorer and helped the club reach the semi-finals of the 1985–86 European Cup before being eliminated by FC Barcelona. He also played in the first half of the 1986–87 UEFA Cup which IFK Göteborg ended up winning after Ekström's departure.

=== Empoli ===
Ekström was the most expensive Swedish transfer of all time when he signed for Empoli during the 1986–87 Serie A season. At Empoli, he became a popular and respected player and acquired the nickname 'Il Ciclone' (the cyclone) due to the exceptional speed he displayed when charging ahead with the ball in his possession, which was his most notable quality.

=== Bayern Munich ===
In 1988 Ekström signed for the German Bundesliga club FC Bayern Munich, and helped them win the 1988–89 Bundesliga title and reach the semi-finals of the 1988–89 UEFA Cup before being eliminated by Napoli.

=== Cannes ===
He signed with AS Cannes in Ligue 1 in 1989 and played alongside a young Zinedine Zidane before leaving the club in 1991.

=== Return to IFK Göteborg ===
Ekström returned to Swedish football and IFK Göteborg in 1991, winning the 1991 and 1993 Swedish Championships, as well as the 1991 Svenska Cupen. He also played in the 1992–93 UEFA Champions League where Göteborg finished joint-third behind Marseille and A.C. Milan.

=== Reggiana ===
Ekström returned to Serie A and Italian football in 1993, signing for Reggiana. Ekström played in 9 Serie A games for Reggiana during the 1993–94 Serie A season before spending the rest of the season on loan in Spain.

==== Loan to Real Betis ====
Ekström spent the spring of 1994 with Real Betis on loan from Reggiana, becoming the second Swedish player to represent the Seville-based club after Torbjörn Jonsson. He played in seven Segunda División games during the 1993–94 season and scored two goals.

=== Dynamo Dresden ===
During the summer of 1994, Ekström returned to German football and the Bundesliga after signing a two-year-contract with Dynamo Dresden. He ended up playing one season for the club, scoring seven goals in 30 Bundesliga games.

=== Eintracht Frankfurt ===
Ekström signed for Eintracht Frankfurt in 1995, and scored two goals in 16 games as the club was relegated to 2. Bundesliga in 1996. He stayed with the club in 2. Bundesliga, but could not help the team win promotion back to the top flight of German football.

=== Second return to IFK Göteborg and retirement ===
He returned to IFK Göteborg a second time in 1997, and spent the 1997 and 1998 Allsvenskan seasons with the club before retiring from professional football in late 1998. In total, Ekström appeared in more than 200 games for IFK Göteborg during his three stints with the club.

== International career ==
=== Youth ===
Ekström played 12 games for the Sweden U21 team and was a part of the Sweden U21 squad that reached the quarterfinals of the 1986 UEFA European Under-21 Championship before being eliminated by Italy.

=== Senior ===
Ekström made his full international debut in a friendly game against Greece on 1 May 1986, playing for 71 minutes alongside Dan Corneliusson at forward before being replaced by Lasse Larsson in a 0–0 draw. He scored his first international goal in a 3–1 friendly win against Finland on 6 August 1986.

==== UEFA Euro 1988 qualifying ====
Ekström made his competitive international debut for Sweden on 24 September 1986 in a UEFA Euro 1988 qualifying game against Switzerland, which Sweden won 2–0 after two goals by Ekström. He went on to score another four goals in the same qualifying campaign, making him the joint-third best goalscorer in the UEFA Euro 1988 qualifiers at six goals together with Alessandra Altobelli but behind John Bosman and Nico Claesen. Despite Ekström's goals, Sweden did not manage to qualify for Euro 1988.

==== 1990 FIFA World Cup ====
Ekström scored two goals during the 1990 FIFA World Cup qualifying campaign to help Sweden qualify for its first World Cup since 1978. While at the 1990 World Cup, he appeared in the second group stage game against Scotland, replacing Stefan Pettersson in the 63rd minute in a 1–2 loss. He started in the third group stage game against Costa Rica, scoring the first goal in a third consecutive 1–2 loss which had Sweden eliminated from the tournament.

==== UEFA Euro 1992 ====
Ekström was a part of the Sweden squad at UEFA Euro 1992 on home soil in Sweden and appeared as a substitute in all four games as Sweden reached the semi-finals of the tournament before being eliminated by Germany.

==== Later years and retirement ====
Ekström played in four 1994 FIFA World Cup qualifying games before announcing his retirement from international football in October 1993. He made a brief comeback on 8 March 1995 in a friendly 3–3 draw with Cyprus in which Ekström scored one of the goals. He won a total of 47 caps for the Sweden national team, scoring 13 goals.

== Career statistics ==
=== International ===
Appearances and goals by national team and year
National team	Year	Apps	Goals
Sweden	1986	8	6
Sweden	1987	8	2
Sweden	1988	5	1
Sweden	1989	7	1
Sweden	1990	6	1
Sweden	1991	0	0
Sweden	1992	9	0
Sweden	1993	3	1
Sweden	1994	0	0
Sweden	1995	1	1
Total		47	13

Scores and results list Sweden's goal tally first, score column indicates score after each Ekström goal.

List of international goals scored by Johnny Ekström
No.	Date	Venue	Opponent	Score	Result	Competition	Ref.
1	6 August 1986	Helsinki Olympic Stadium, Helsinki, Finland	Finland	2–0	3–1	Friendly	
2	10 September 1986	Råsunda Stadium, Solna, Sweden	England	1–0	1–0	Friendly	
3	24 September 1986	Råsunda Stadium, Solna, Sweden	Switzerland	1–0	2–0	UEFA Euro 1988 qualifier	
4	24 September 1986	Råsunda Stadium, Solna, Sweden	Switzerland	2–0	2–0	UEFA Euro 1988 qualifier	
5	16 November 1986	Ta´Qali Stadion, Ta´Qali, Malta	Malta	4–0	5–0	UEFA Euro 1988 qualifier	
6	16 November 1986	Ta´Qali Stadion, Ta´Qali, Malta	Malta	5–0	5–0	UEFA Euro 1988 qualifier	
7	24 May 1987	Ullevi, Gothenburg, Sweden	Malta	1–0	1–0	UEFA Euro 1988 qualifier	
8	17 June 1987	Stade Olympique, Lausanne, Switzerland	Switzerland	1–1	1–1	UEFA Euro 1988 qualifier	
9	5 November 1988	Qemal Stafa Stadium, Tirana, Albania	Albania	2–1	2–1	1990 FIFA World Cup qualifier	
10	25 October 1989	Silesian Stadium, Chorzów, Poland	Poland	2–0	2–0	1990 FIFA World Cup qualifier	
11	20 June 1990	Stadio Luigi Ferraris, Genoa, Italy	Costa Rica	1–0	1–2	1990 FIFA World Cup	
12	15 April 1993	Nepstadion, Budapest, Hungary	Hungary	1–0	2–0	Friendly	
13	8 March 1995	Tsirion Athletic Centre, Limassol, Cyprus	Cyprus	2–1	3–3	Friendly	

== Honours ==
IFK Göteborg

- Allsvenskan: 1984, 1991, 1993
- Svenska Cupen: 1991
- UEFA Cup: 1986–87

Bayern München

- Bundesliga: 1988–89

Individual

- Allsvenskan top scorer: 1986
- Stor Grabb: 1988
- Årets ärkeängel: 1992
