= Gay O'Carroll =

Irish footballer

Personal information
- Full name: Gabriel O'Carroll
- Date of birth: 21 January 1964 (age 61)
- Place of birth: Dublin, Ireland
- Position: Midfielder

Senior career*
Years	Team	Apps	(Gls)
1982–1984	Shamrock Rovers		
1984–1986	Shelbourne		
1986–1987	St Patrick's Athletic	9	(0)
- * Club domestic league appearances and goals

Gay O'Carroll (born 21 January 1964) is an Irish former footballer who played as a midfielder.

He began his career at Shamrock Rovers making his first team debut in a friendly win at Glenmalure Park in August 1982.

He scored once in two appearances in the 1982–83 UEFA Cup.

He joined Shelbourne in 1984. O'Carroll signed for St Patrick's Athletic in March 1986.

== Sources ==
- Paul Doolan; Robert Goggins. The Hoops. ISBN 0-7171-2121-6.
