= Juan Lozano =

Spanish footballer

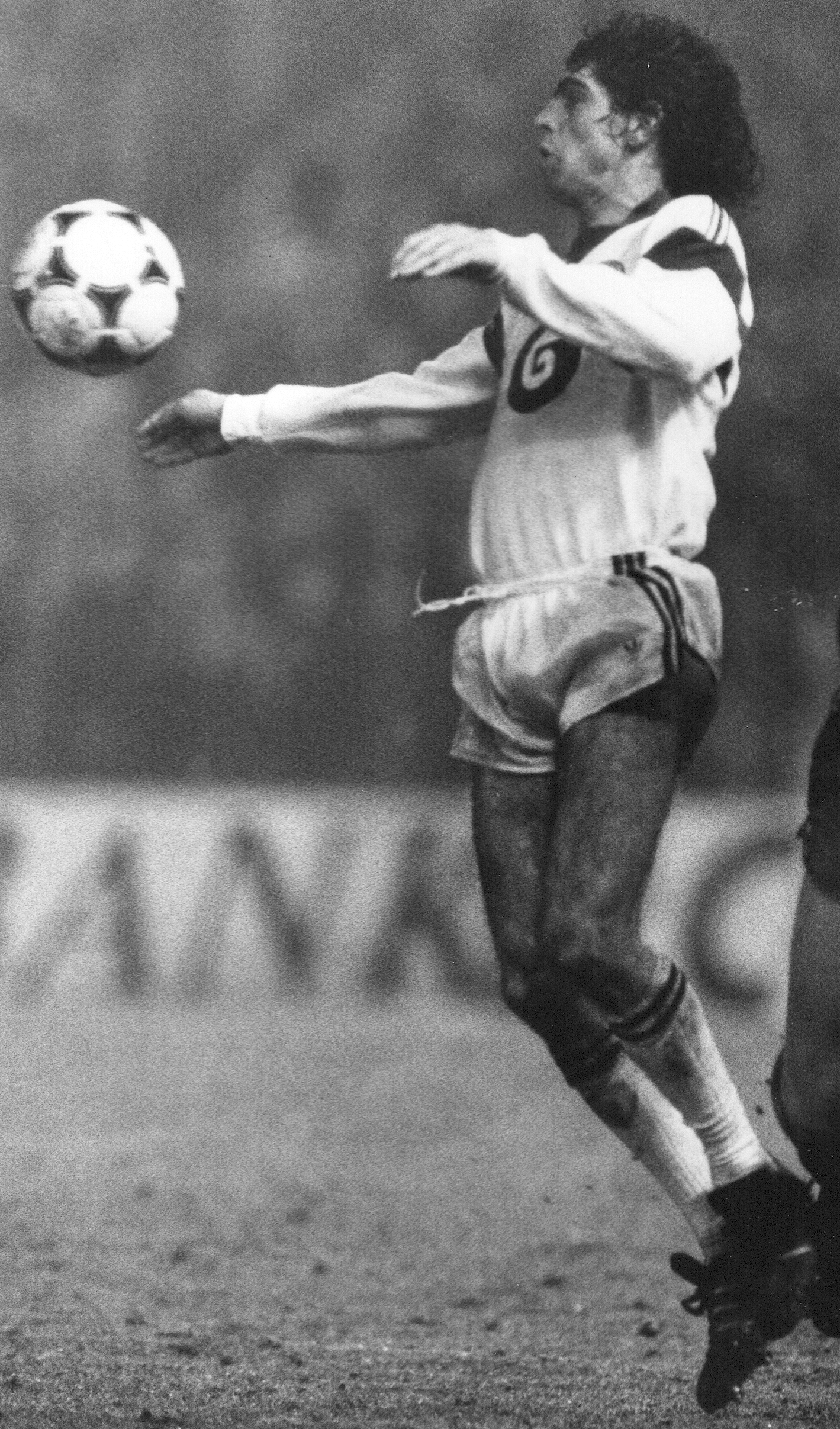
- Lozano with Anderlecht in 1986

Personal information
- Full name: Juan José Lozano Bohórquez
- Date of birth: 30 August 1955 (age 71)
- Place of birth: Coria del Río, Spain
- Height: 1.72 m (5 ft 7 1/2 in)
- Position: Attacking midfielder

Youth career
- 1966–1974: Beerschot

Senior career*
Years	Team	Apps	(Gls)
1974–1980	Beerschot	84	(22)
1980	Washington Diplomats	10	(4)
1981–1983	Anderlecht	75	(28)
1983–1985	Real Madrid	24	(6)
1985–1989	Anderlecht	53	(13)
1989–1990	Eendracht Aalst	18	(0)
Total		264	(73)
- * Club domestic league appearances and goals

Juan José Lozano Bohórquez (born 30 August 1955) is a Spanish former professional footballer who played as an attacking midfielder.

== Club career ==
Born in Coria del Río, Province of Seville, Lozano's parents migrated to Belgium when he was still very young. He lived near K. Beerschot VAC's stadium, and joined its youth system at age 11, making his senior debut in 1974 at the age of 19 and soon standing out for his outstanding dribbling skills.

Lozano moved to the United States in 1980 to play for the Washington Diplomats, but soon returned to Belgium, being signed by RSC Anderlecht where he continued to regularly put on stellar performances. In 1982–83, he was instrumental in the Brussels side's victory in the UEFA Cup – a 2–1 aggregate win against S.L. Benfica – scoring in the second leg in Lisbon with his head.

In the summer of 1983, Real Madrid bought the 28-year-old Lozano whom, in spite of limited playing time due to physical problems and several run-ins with manager Amancio, did score six goals in La Liga, also winning another UEFA Cup. He subsequently returned to Anderlecht, continuing his success there as he came close to being awarded the Golden Shoe a couple of times.

On 11 April 1987, Lozano's career all but came to an end after a tackle by K.S.V. Waregem's Ivan Desloover, which resulted in a broken leg. He still won the Footballer of the Year award for the season as his team went on to win three leagues in a row, but would never return to his previous form.

Lozano retired professionally in 1990 aged 34, his last club being S.C. Eendracht Aalst in the Belgian Second Division. He still played some amateur football with Berchem Sport.

== International career ==
The Royal Belgian Football Association tried to naturalise Lozano in order to select him for the 1982 FIFA World Cup. However, this request was rejected by the Senate (with Herman Vanderpoorten playing a major role) on the grounds that the player would only become eligible to represent the national team one year later.

== Honours ==
Beerschot

- Belgian Cup: 1978–79

Anderlecht

- Belgian Pro League: 1985–86, 1986–87
- Belgian Cup: 1987–88, 1988–89
- Belgian Supercup: 1981, 1985, 1986, 1987
- UEFA Cup: 1982–83
- Jules Pappaert Cup: 1983, 1985
- Bruges Matins: 1985, 1988

Real Madrid

- UEFA Cup: 1984–85

Individual

- Belgian Professional Footballer of the Year: 1987
