= 1986 in Swedish football =

The 1986 season in Swedish football, starting January 1986 and ending December 1986:

== Honours ==
=== Official titles ===
Title	Team	Reason
Swedish Champions 1986	Malmö FF	Winners of Allsvenskan play-off
Swedish Cup Champions 1985–86	Malmö FF	Winners of Svenska Cupen

=== Competitions ===
Level	Competition	Team
1st level	Allsvenskan 1986	Malmö FF
1st level	Allsvenskan play-off 1986	Malmö FF
2nd level	Division 2 Norra 1986	GIF Sundsvall
2nd level	Division 2 Södra 1986	Västra Frölunda IF
Cup	Svenska Cupen 1985–86	Malmö FF

== Promotions, relegations and qualifications ==
=== Promotions ===
Promoted from	Promoted to	Team	Reason
Division 2 Norra 1986	Allsvenskan 1987	GIF Sundsvall	Winners
Division 2 Södra 1986	Allsvenskan 1987	Västra Frölunda IF	Winners
Division 3 1986	Division 1 Norra 1987	BK Forward	Winners of promotion play-off
Division 3 1986	Division 1 Norra 1987	IFK Mora	Winners of promotion play-off
Division 3 1986	Division 1 Södra 1987	IFK Hässleholm	Winners of promotion play-off
Division 3 1986	Division 1 Södra 1987	Ifö/Bromölla IF	Winners of promotion play-off
Division 3 1986	Division 1 Södra 1987	IK Oddevold	Winners of promotion play-off
Division 3 1986	Division 1 Södra 1987	Skövde AIK	Winners of promotion play-off

=== League transfers ===
Transferred from	Transferred to	Team	Reason
Division 2 Södra 1986	Division 1 Norra 1987	Karlstad BK	Geographical composition

=== Relegations ===
Relegated from	Relegated to	Team	Reason
Allsvenskan 1986	Division 1 Södra 1987	Kalmar FF	11th team
Allsvenskan 1986	Division 1 Norra 1987	Djurgårdens IF	12th team
Division 2 Norra 1986	Division 2 1987	Enköpings SK	12th team
Division 2 Norra 1986	Division 2 1987	Sandvikens IF	13th team
Division 2 Norra 1986	Division 2 1987	Ope IF	14th team
Division 2 Södra 1986	Division 2 1987	Helsingborgs IF	12th team
Division 2 Södra 1986	Division 2 1987	Markaryd IF	13th team
Division 2 Södra 1986	Division 2 1987	Norrby IF	14th team

=== International qualifications ===
Qualified for	Enters	Team	Reason
European Cup 1987–88	1st round	Malmö FF	Winners of Allsvenskan play-off
UEFA Cup 1987–88	1st round	IFK Göteborg	2nd team in Allsvenskan
UEFA Cup 1987–88	1st round	AIK	3rd team in Allsvenskan
UEFA Cup Winners' Cup 1986–87	1st round	Malmö FF	Winners of Svenska Cupen
International Football Cup 1987	Group stage	Malmö FF	Unknown
International Football Cup 1987	Group stage	AIK	Unknown
International Football Cup 1987	Group stage	Halmstads BK	Unknown
International Football Cup 1987	Group stage	Hammarby IF	Unknown

== Domestic results ==
=== Allsvenskan 1986 ===
	Team	Pld	W	D	L	GF		GA	GD	Pts
1	Malmö FF	22	16	5	1	49	–	11	+38	37
2	IFK Göteborg	22	13	5	4	44	–	17	+27	31
3	AIK	22	9	7	6	29	–	21	+8	25
4	IFK Norrköping	22	9	3	10	30	–	30	0	21
5	Halmstads BK	22	8	5	9	25	–	32	-7	21
6	Hammarby IF	22	8	4	10	31	–	38	-7	20
7	Östers IF	22	6	8	8	20	–	28	-8	20
8	IK Brage	22	8	4	10	19	–	27	-8	20
9	Örgryte IS	22	7	5	10	33	–	35	-2	19
10	IF Elfsborg	22	5	8	9	19	–	26	-7	18
11	Kalmar FF	22	5	7	10	22	–	36	-14	17
12	Djurgårdens IF	22	7	1	14	23	–	43	-20	15

=== Allsvenskan play-off 1986 ===
Semi-finals

15 October 1986

IFK Norrköping	2–2	Malmö FF

?, ?
18 October 1986

Malmö FF	(ag) 0–0	IFK Norrköping

?, ?

15 October 1986

AIK	0–0	IFK Göteborg

?, ?
18 October 1986

IFK Göteborg	1–1 (ag)	AIK

?, ?

Final

26 October 1986

AIK	1–0	Malmö FF

Råsunda, Solna
1 November 1986

Malmö FF	5–2	AIK

Malmö Stadion, Malmö

=== Division 2 Norra 1986 ===
	Team	Pld	W	D	L	GF		GA	GD	Pts
1	GIF Sundsvall	26	12	10	4	51	–	25	+26	34
2	IF Brommapojkarna	26	13	7	6	48	–	38	+1	33
3	Västerås SK	26	12	8	6	37	–	28	+9	32
4	Gefle IF	26	12	6	8	41	–	23	+18	30
5	IFK Västerås	26	10	9	7	39	–	40	-1	29
6	Vasalunds IF	26	12	4	10	34	–	29	+5	28
7	Skellefteå AIK	26	11	6	9	31	–	28	+3	28
8	Degerfors IF	26	8	8	10	35	–	38	-3	24
9	IFK Eskilstuna	26	9	6	11	41	–	46	-5	24
10	Luleå FF/IFK	26	7	9	10	25	–	28	-3	23
11	Örebro SK	26	7	7	12	26	–	28	-2	21
12	Enköpings SK	26	8	5	13	28	–	39	-11	21
13	Sandvikens IF	26	7	7	12	31	–	43	-12	21
14	Ope IF	26	4	8	14	21	–	55	-34	16

=== Division 2 Södra 1986 ===
	Team	Pld	W	D	L	GF		GA	GD	Pts
1	Västra Frölunda IF	26	18	6	2	48	–	11	+37	42
2	Mjällby AIF	26	16	7	3	72	–	24	+48	39
3	GAIS	26	15	8	3	42	–	15	+27	38
4	Åtvidabergs FF	26	8	13	5	29	–	31	-2	29
5	Kalmar AIK	26	11	4	11	46	–	42	+4	26
6	Landskrona BoIS	26	8	9	9	32	–	34	-2	25
7	Trelleborgs FF	26	9	7	10	32	–	35	-3	25
8	Karlskrona AIF	26	10	5	11	27	–	36	-9	25
9	Karlstad BK	26	8	9	9	31	–	41	-10	25
10	Myresjö IF	26	7	9	10	35	–	50	-15	23
11	BK Häcken	26	7	8	11	29	–	37	-8	22
12	Helsingborgs IF	26	7	5	14	23	–	31	-8	19
13	Markaryds IF	26	3	9	14	29	–	50	-21	15
14	Norrby IF	26	5	1	20	27	–	65	-38	11

=== Division 1 promotion play-off 1986 ===
11 October 1986

IFK Holmsund	1–2	Skövde AIK

?, ?
19 October 1986

Skövde AIK	1–2 3–2 (apen)	IFK Holmsund

?, ?

11 October 1986

IK Oddevold	2–0	Gullringens GoIF

?, ?
19 October 1986

Gullringens GoIF	2–2	IK Oddevold

?, ?

12 October 1986

Films SK	2–1	Ifö/Bromölla IF

?, ?
19 October 1986

Ifö/Bromölla IF	4–1	Films SK

?, ?

12 October 1986

IFK Kalix	0–2	IFK Mora

?, ?
18 October 1986

IFK Mora	1–1	IFK Kalix

?, ?

12 October 1986

Tyresö FF	3–2	IFK Hässleholm

?, ?
19 October 1986

IFK Hässleholm	(ag) 1–0	Tyresö FF

?, ?

12 October 1986

BK Forward	1–0	Falkenbergs FF

?, ?
19 October 1986

Falkenbergs FF	2–1 (ag)	BK Forward

?, ?

=== Svenska Cupen 1985–86 ===
Final

2 July 1986

Malmö FF	2–1	IFK Göteborg

Råsunda, Solna

== National team results ==
1 May 1986

Sweden	0–0	Greece

Malmö Stadion, Malmö
Attendance: 9,944
Referee: Aass (Norway)

14 May 1986

Austria	1–0	Sweden
Kienast 51'

Lehner Stadion, Salzburg
Attendance: 12,500
Referee: van Ettekoven (Netherlands)

6 August 1986

Finland	1–3	Sweden
Lipponen 60'		Prytz 23', 35' (p); Ekström 33'

Olympiastadion, Helsinki
Attendance: 7,040
Referee: Halle (Norway)

20 August 1986

Sweden	0–0	Soviet Union

Ullevi, Gothenburg
Attendance: 13,043
Referee: Damgaard (Denmark)

10 September 1986

Sweden	1–0	England
Ekström 49'

Råsunda, Solna
Attendance: 15,646
Referee: Föckler (West Germany)

24 September 1986

Sweden	2–0	Switzerland
Ekström 19', 79'

Råsunda, Solna
Attendance: 26,489
Referee: Christov (Czechoslovakia)

12 October 1986

Portugal	1–1	Sweden
Coelho 69'		Strömberg 51'

Estádio Nacional, Lisbon
Attendance: 15,106
Referee: Hackett (England)

16 November 1986

Malta	0–5	Sweden
		Hysén 38'; Magnusson 68'; Fredriksson 70'; Ekström 80', 84'

National Stadium, Ta'Qali/Mdina
Attendance: 11,615
Referee: Hartmann (Hungary)
