= Milan Čermák =

Czech footballer

Personal information
- Date of birth: 24 December 1949 (age 76)
- Place of birth: Czechoslovakia
- Position: Forward

Senior career*
| Years | Team | Apps | (Gls) |
| 1973–1978 | Sparta Prague | | |
| 1978 | Baník Ostrava | | |
| 1978–1981 | Bohemians | | |
| 1981 | SK Kladno | | |
| 1981–1985 | Bohemians | 76 | (14) |
| 1985–1986 | FK Teplice | | |

International career
| 1974–83 | Czechoslovakia | 7 | (1) |
| 1977 | Czechoslovakia B | 1 | (0) |
| 1977 | Czechoslovakia Olympic | 1 | (1) |
- * Club domestic league appearances and goals

Milan Čermák (born 24 December 1949, in Czechoslovakia) is a retired footballer who played as a forward. He scored 36 goals in 218 Czechoslovak First League appearances, playing for Sparta Prague, Baník Ostrava, and Bohemians. He was part of the Bohemians side which won the 1982–83 Czechoslovak First League. Internationally he represented Czechoslovakia, scoring once in seven appearances between 1974 and 1983.
