= Ronnie Murphy (footballer) =

Irish footballer

Personal information
- Date of birth: 3 September 1962 (age 64)
- Place of birth: Dublin, Ireland
- Position: Centre-half

Senior career*
Years	Team	Apps	(Gls)
1980–1983	Shamrock Rovers	64	(0)
1983–1990	Bohemians	163	(6)
1990–1993	Dundalk	89	(1)
1993–1995	Monaghan United	46	(0)
1995–1996	Finn Harps	35	(1)
1996–1997	Longford Town	25	(2)
Total		422	(10)
- * Club domestic league appearances and goals

Ronnie Murphy (born 3 September 1962) was an Irish soccer player during the 1980s and 1990s.

A defender, he represented Shamrock Rovers, Bohemians, Dundalk and Monaghan United during his career.

== Career ==
While with Rovers he won the Leinster Senior Cup in 1982 and scored in the 1982-83 UEFA Cup . He got sent off in the next round at FC Universitatea Craiova on 3 November 1982.

He played 4 times in European competition for Shamrock Rovers.

A youth international, Ronnie made 163 Llague appearances (6 goals) and 3 European appearances for Bohemians after signing for them in 1983. He signed for Dundalk in June 1990 and won a League of Ireland winners medal in his first season at the club. He remained at Oriel Park until the beginning of the 1993/94 season when he signed for Monaghan.
