= Miroslav Příložný =

Czech footballer

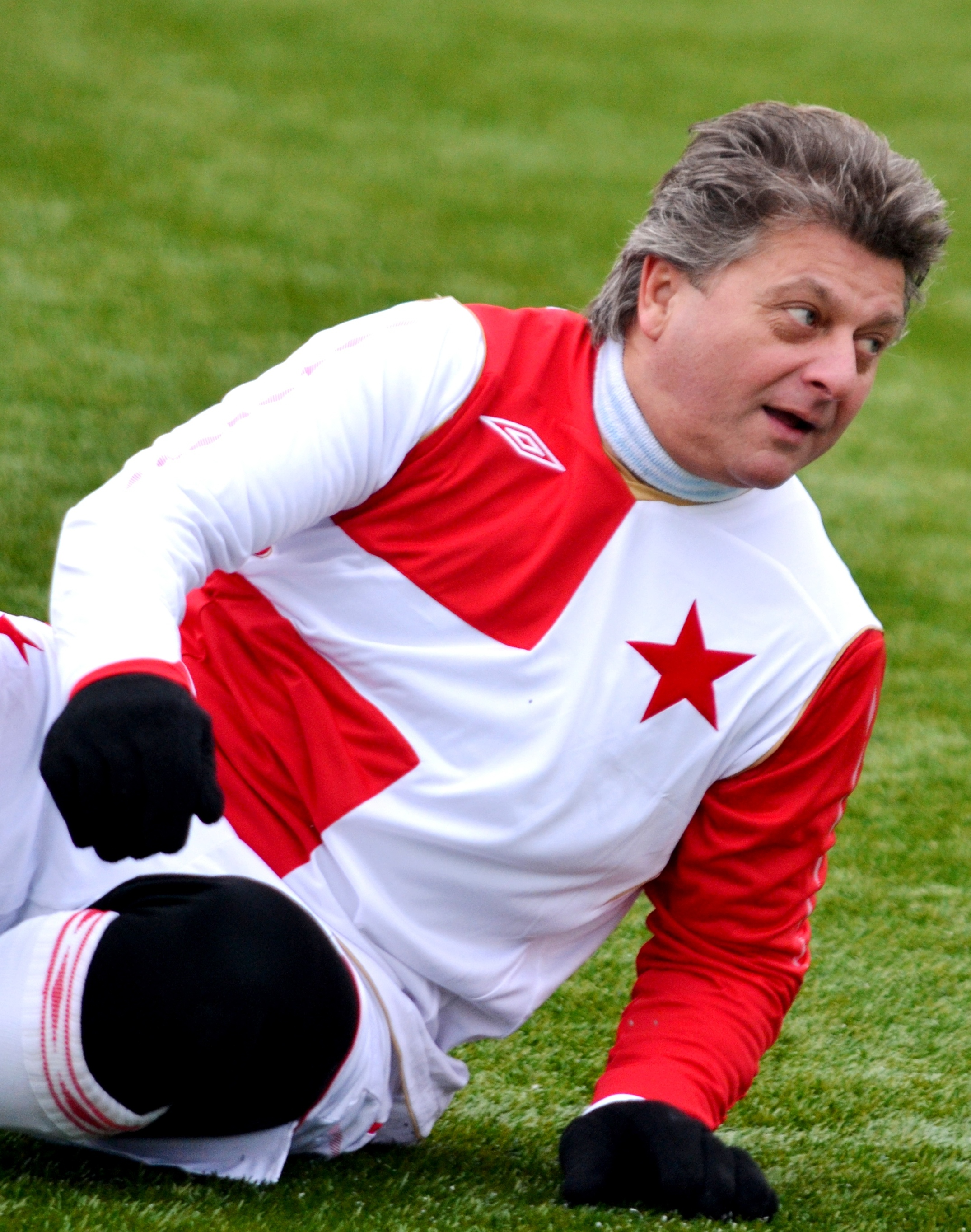
- Příložný in 2014

Personal information
- Date of birth: 27 November 1955 (age 70)
- Place of birth: Duchcov, Czechoslovakia
- Position: Forward

Senior career*
Years	Team	Apps	(Gls)
1978–1981	Slavia Prague		
1981–1982	Mladá Boleslav		
1982–1984	Bohemians Praha		
1984–1987	Sigma Olomouc		
1987–1988	Vorwärts Steyr		
1988–1990	AEL Limassol		
- * Club domestic league appearances and goals

Miroslav Příložný (born 27 November 1955) is a Czech retired forward.
