= John Larsen (footballer) =

Danish footballer (born 1962)

Personal information
- Full name: John Høholt Larsen
- Date of birth: 25 May 1962 (age 64)
- Place of birth: Denmark
- Position: Defender

Senior career*
Years	Team	Apps	(Gls)
- Helsingør IF
- Lyngby BK
- Vejle BK

International career
- Denmark U21
	Denmark	19	(1)
- * Club domestic league appearances and goals

John Høholt Larsen (born 25 May 1962), known as John Larsen, is a Danish former football (soccer) player in the defender position. He played for Helsingør IF, Lyngby BK and Vejle BK, winning the 1983 and 1992 Danish championships with Lyngby. He played 19 games for the Denmark national football team, scoring one goal against the United Arab Emirates. He also represented the Denmark national under-21 football team.
