= Kenneth Brylle =

Danish footballer (born 1959)

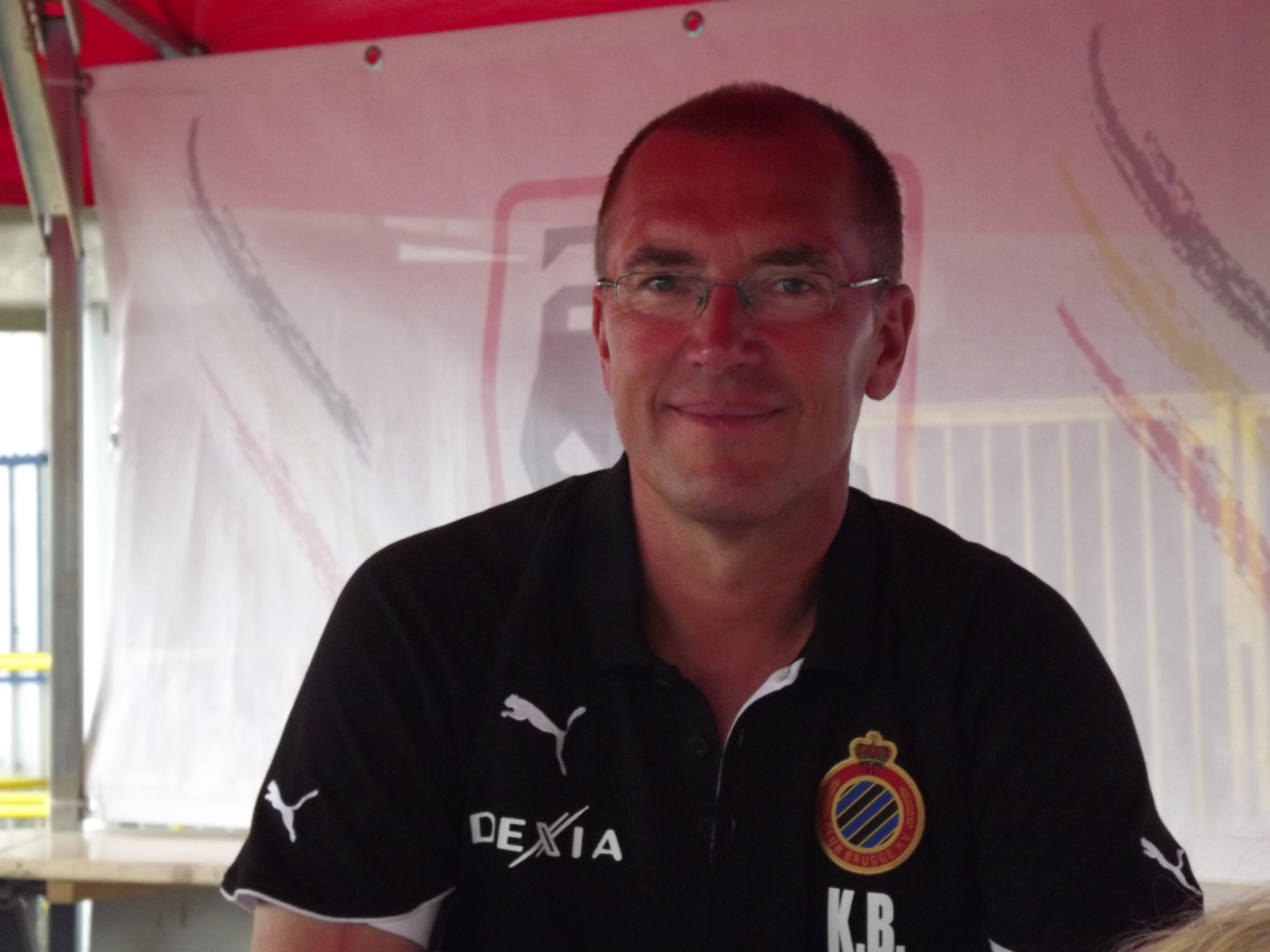
- Brylle in 2011

Personal information
- Full name: Kenneth Brylle Larsen
- Date of birth: 22 May 1959 (age 67)
- Place of birth: Copenhagen, Denmark
- Height: 1.83 m (6 ft 0 in)
- Position: Forward

Youth career
- 1969–1977: Hvidovre

Senior career*
Years	Team	Apps	(Gls)
1976–1978	Hvidovre	36	(16)
1978–1979	Vejle Boldklub	24	(13)
1979–1984	Anderlecht	122	(50)
1984–1985	PSV Eindhoven	31	(17)
1985–1986	Marseille	35	(6)
1986–1989	Club Brugge	72	(29)
1986–1987	→ Sabadell (loan)	8	(2)
1989–1991	Beerschot	43	(10)
1991–1992	Lierse	12	(1)
1992–1993	Knokke	?	(?)
Total		383	(144)

International career
1976–1977	Denmark U19	6	(4)
1979–1983	Denmark U21	9	(3)
1980–1988	Denmark	16	(2)

Managerial career
- 1998–2001: Knokke
- 2001–2003: Oostende
- 2003–2005: Eendracht Aalter
- 2006–2008: White Star Lauwe
- 2008: Wielsbeke
- 2009–2010: Hvidovre
- 2011–: Club Brugge (Line coach strikers & scout)
- * Club domestic league appearances and goals

Kenneth Brylle Larsen (born 22 May 1959) is a Danish former professional footballer. He scored two goals in 16 matches for the Denmark national team and represented his country at the 1984 European Championship.

== Biography ==
Born in Copenhagen, Brylle started playing football with local club Frederiksberg Boldklub (FB). He played for Hvidovre IF in the secondary Danish 2nd Division, and helped the club win promotion for the top-flight Danish 1st Division in the 1978 season. Before the start of the 1979 season, he moved to 1st Division rivals Vejle Boldklub, where he got his national breakthrough. He scored 18 goals in 26 league games, before moving abroad to play professionally for Belgian club RSC Anderlecht in 1979. He stayed five years at Anderlecht, with whom he won the 1983 UEFA Cup, scoring the only goal in the final.

He moved to Dutch team PSV Eindhoven in 1984 and on to Olympique Marseille in France in 1985. In 1986, he moved back to Belgium to play for Club Brugge. He played a total of 101 matches and scored 49 goals for Club Brugge, with whom he won the 1988 Jupiler League championship. He went on to play for Belgian clubs Beerschot, Lierse S.K. and Knokke.

He became a FIFA-certified coach, and coached lower league clubs such as FC Knokke, KV Oostende, Eendracht Aalter, White Star Lauwe and Wielsbeke in Belgium. He later managed Danish side Hvidovre IF from 1 January 2009 until 31 December 2010. He has changed his nationality to Belgian.

== Honours ==
Anderlecht

- Belgian First Division: 1980–81
- UEFA Cup: 1982–83; runner-up 1983–84
- Jules Pappaert Cup: 1983

Club Brugge

- Belgian First Division: 1987–88
- Belgian Super Cup: 1986, 1988

Marseille

- Coupe de France runner-up: 1985–86

Individual

- UEFA Cup Top Scorer: 1987–88 (6 goals)
