= Steve Galloway =

English footballer (born 1963)

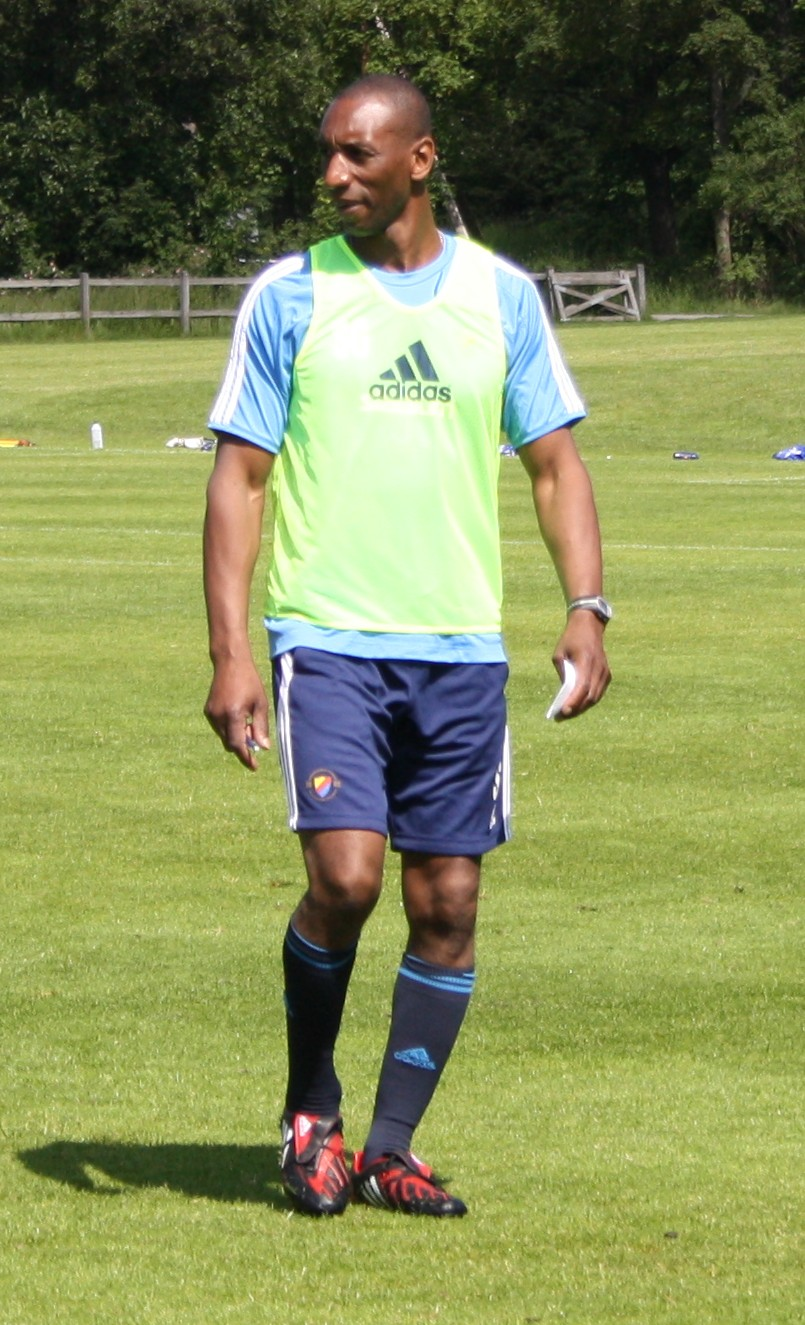
- Galloway in 2009

Personal information
- Date of birth: 13 February 1963 (age 63)
- Place of birth: Hannover, West Germany
- Position: Forward

Team information
- Current team: Umeå FC (assistant manager)

Senior career*
Years	Team	Apps	(Gls)
–1984	Sutton United		
1984–1986	Crystal Palace	5	(1)
1985	→ Cambridge United (loan)	1	(0)
1986–1987	Maidstone United		
1987	Tegs SK	21	(16)
1988–1989	Djurgårdens IF	45	(17)
1989	→ St Mirren (loan)	4	(0)
1990–2000	Umeå FC	278	(114)
Total		354	(148)

Managerial career
- 2004: Umeå FC
- 2009: Djurgårdens IF (assistant manager)
- 2010: Umeå Södra
- 2016–: Umeå FC (assistant manager)
- * Club domestic league appearances and goals

Steve Galloway (born 13 February 1963) is an English football coach and former player. He is the assistant manager of Umeå FC.

As a player, Galloway played professionally as a forward in England, Scotland and Sweden.

== Playing career ==
Born in Hannover, West Germany, Galloway played in English non-league football at Sutton United, before moving into the Football League with Crystal Palace in 1984. He spent two seasons with Palace – which included a loan spell at Cambridge United – before joining non-league Maidstone United in 1986. He was brought to the Umeå-based club Tegs SK for the 1987 season in Sweden. His goalscoring ability earned him a contract with Djurgårdens IF – where he stayed for two seasons which included a loan spell in Scotland with St Mirren. In 1990, he returned to Umeå to help local club Umeå FC rise in the Swedish football league.

== Coaching career ==
Galloway has coached Umeå FC, and coached Djurgårdens IF as assistant to Andrée Jeglertz in the 2009 season.

In 2010, he became head coach for Umeå Södra.

== After football ==
Steve filmed two seasons of the hit Swedish show Gladiatorerna as the Timekeeper. Galloway currently lives in Umeå in Sweden, and owns a sport store called Fotbollskliniken and three restaurants.
