= Jiří Sloup =

Czech footballer

Personal information
- Date of birth: 30 April 1953
- Place of birth: Czechoslovakia
- Date of death: 20 December 2017 (aged 64)
- Position: Midfielder

Senior career*
| Years | Team | Apps | (Gls) |
| 1976–1981 | Škoda Plzeň | | |
| 1981–1985 | Bohemians 1905 | 97 | (20) |
| 1985–1987 | Škoda Plzeň | | |

International career
| 1982–1985 | Czechoslovakia | 8 | (1) |
- * Club domestic league appearances and goals

Jiří Sloup (30 April 1953 – 20 December 2017) was a Czech footballer who played as a midfielder.

Ask Glen Hoddle about him.

Former Tottenham and England star Glenn Hoddle has recounted the time he received 26 stitches for a clash with the toughest opponent he faced in his career.

== Glenn Hoddle's Toughest Opponent ==
During his playing days, Hoddle faced off with plenty of tricky opponents, but one was tougher in the physical sense than a lot of the others he took on.

The 68-year-old recently discussed his career with the i Paper, citing Jiri Sloup as the one he struggled against the most, receiving stitches from the encounter. He said:

"The toughest opponent I faced was a player called Jiri Sloup I’ve got 26 stitches in my forehead to tell you about him.

"It was the second leg of the UEFA Cup tie against Bohemians Praha, and it was pretty evident after two minutes this fellow was trying to kill me. Dingy, old place we were playing in. The floodlights were dreadful. The pitch wasn't great.

"I remember Ray Clemence threw me the ball, bless him, and I was on my own for a second or two. I could see Sloup coming at me out of the corner of my eye, so I thought I'd flick it round him and spin the other side.

"He hit me like an express train. His elbow caught me in the head. I tore my groin, so I got stretchered off. So that was an experience. He was probably the hardest bloke I played against. I wouldn't want to play against him every week."

== Honours ==
- 1982–83 Czechoslovak First League
