= Jukka Turunen =

Finnish footballer (born 1964)

Personal information
- Date of birth: 29 January 1964 (age 62)
- Place of birth: Kuopio, Finland
- Height: 1.76 m (5 ft 9 1/2 in)
- Position: Forward

Senior career*
Years	Team	Apps	(Gls)
1981–1986	Koparit	92	(24)
1986–1991	KuPS	143	(49)
1992–1994	MYPA	59	(25)
1994–1995	KuPS	14	(1)

International career
1989–1992	Finland	7	(0)
- * Club domestic league appearances and goals

Jukka Turunen (born 29 January 1964) is a retired Finnish footballer who played as a forward.

== Honours ==
KuPS

- Finnish Cup: 1989

MyPa

- Finnish Cup: 1992
