= Rhonny Nilsson =

Swedish footballer (born 1958)

Personal information
- Full name: Bengt Olov Rhonny Nilsson
- Date of birth: 3 July 1958 (age 68)
- Place of birth: Sveg, Sweden
- Position: Midfielder

Senior career*
Years	Team	Apps	(Gls)
1980–1988	IK Brage		
1989–1993	Sogndal		
1994	Raufoss		
1995	Jotun		
- * Club domestic league appearances and goals

Rhonny Nilsson (born 3 July 1958) is a Swedish retired football midfielder.

Nilsson played nearly a decade in IK Brage before making his move to Norway. Nilsson was ever-present in Sogndal's first-tier seasons in 1989, 1991 and 1992, amassing 66 Eliteserien games. After the 1993 season he left to take one year in Raufoss IL and one year in IL Jotun.
