= Göran Holter =

Swedish footballer

Personal information
- Full name: Nils Olof Göran Holter
- Date of birth: 16 November 1963 (age 62)
- Position: Forward

Senior career*
Years	Team	Apps	(Gls)
1980–1985	Degerfors IF		
1986–1991	IFK Norrköping		
1992	SK Brann	21	(3)
1993	Linköpings FF		
1994	IFK Norrköping		
1996	Karlstad BK		
1997–1998	BK Olympic		
1999	Tollarps IF		
- * Club domestic league appearances and goals

Göran Holter (born 16 November 1963) is a Swedish retired football striker.
