= Jacky Munaron =

Belgian footballer (born 1956)

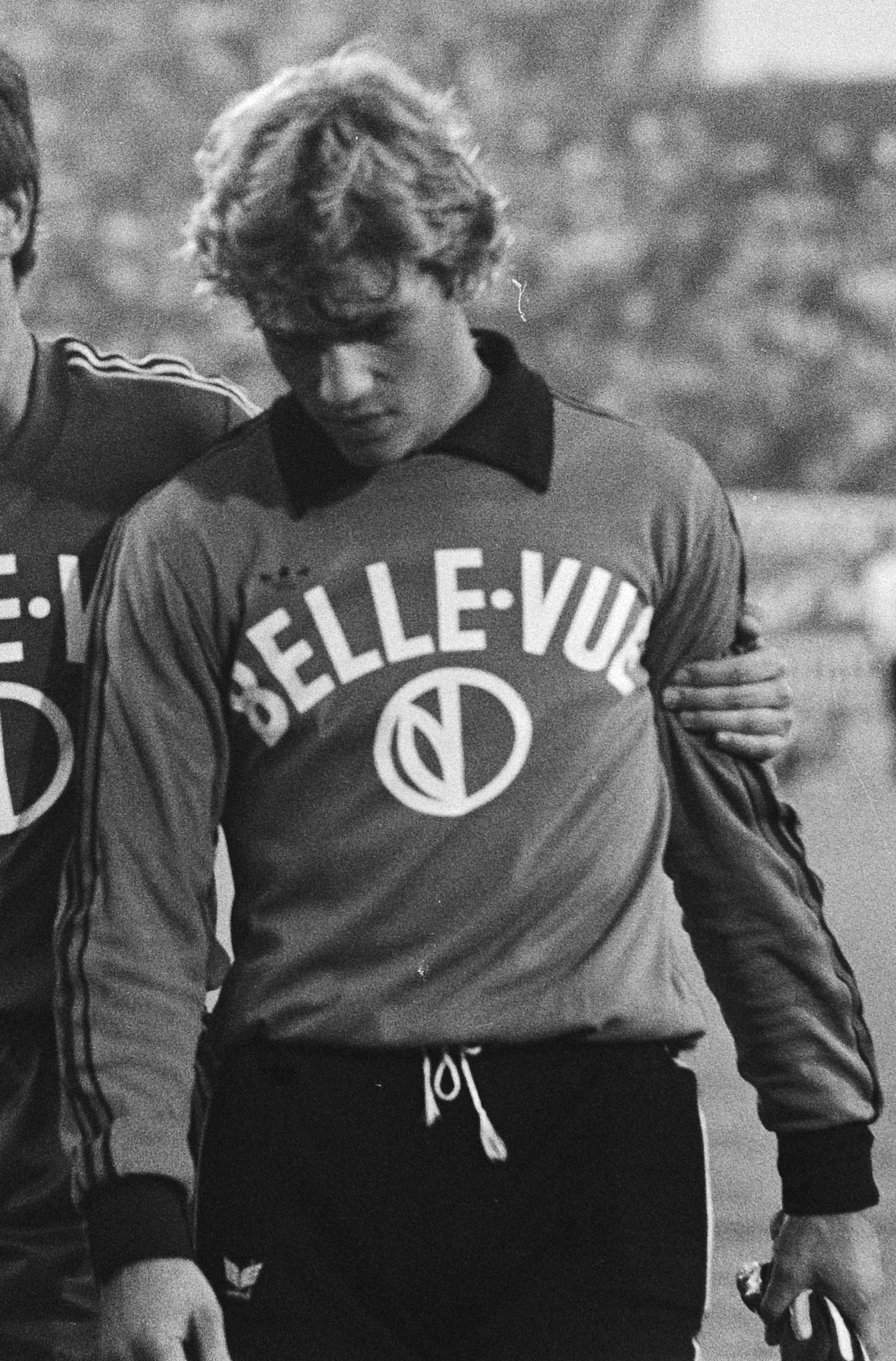
- Munaron with Anderlecht in 1978

Personal information
- Full name: Jacques Munaron
- Date of birth: 8 September 1956 (age 70)
- Place of birth: Namur, Belgium
- Height: 1.80 m (5 ft 11 in)
- Position: Goalkeeper

Senior career*
Years	Team	Apps	(Gls)
1973–1974	F.C. Dinant	0	(0)
1974–1989	Anderlecht	293	(0)
1989–1992	RFC Liège	27	(0)
1992–1994	Standard Liège	5	(0)
Total		325	(0)

International career
1982–1986	Belgium	8	(0)

Managerial career
- 1999–2007: Anderlecht (goalkeeper coach)
- 1998–2009: Belgium (goalkeeper coach)
- 2009–2010: Trabzonspor (goalkeeper coach)
- 2010–2014: Gent (goalkeeper coach)
- 2015–2016: FCV Dender EH (goalkeeper coach)
- 2016–2017: Mouscron (goalkeeper coach)
- 2017–2021: Halle-Gooik (goalkeeper coach)
- * Club domestic league appearances and goals

Jacques "Jacky" Munaron (born 8 September 1956) is a Belgian former football goalkeeper. As goalkeeper coach, he most recently worked for futsal team FP Halle-Gooik until 2021.

As a young player, Munaron started as the keeper of the youth team of FC Dinant, and Munaron stayed in Dinant and became a player of the A-team. FC Dinant played in the Third Division at that time. In 1974, Munaron was discovered by RSC Anderlecht and moved to Brussels.

Over there, he was only a substitute player, as Jan Ruiter, the Dutch keeper of Anderlecht, was the first choice of the trainer. Also later, when Anderlecht bought Nico de Bree, another Dutch player of RWDM, Munaron was a substitute player.

Munaron got some chances to play and quickly became the real number one of Anderlecht. Ruiter left in 1977 and De Bree was sold in 1980, but Munaron stayed. Munaron stayed in total 15 seasons in Anderlecht, from 1974 until 1989. He was four times national champion with Anderlecht and won the Belgian Cup four times. He also played as Anderlecht won the 1983 UEFA Cup Final.

In 1988 the competition within the team was stronger again. Munaron became older and Anderlecht picked the younger keeper Filip De Wilde more frequently. As a result, Munaron moved to Club Liège in 1989. At Liège he won another Belgian Cup in 1990.

In 1992 Standard de Liège wanted to buy Munaron from Club Liège and Munaron made the move. The keeper was 36 years at that time and became a substitute, because Gilbert Bodart was the first keeper at Standard in the early '90s.

In 1995 Munaron joined Eendracht Aalst, but in 1996 he decided to retire. He played eight times for the Belgium national team throughout his career.

After his career as a player, Munaron became a trainer. He was keeper-trainer of Belgium, RSC Anderlecht and the Turkish team Trabzonspor. From the season 2010–11 he worked for AA Gent, but at the start of 2014–15 he left the club. He went to FCV Dender to become goalkeeper coach. After this adventure he became the goalkeeper coach of Royal Excelsior Mouscron (Belgian first division).

At the end of the season 2016–2017 Munaron was pushed away from REM in a very disrespectful manner, making him decide to leave football and choose a new challenge, namely Futsal.

As of 1 July 2017, Munaron became a goalkeeper coach at FP Halle-Gooik (a Belgian top team that had become national champion 3 times in a row at that time). Again, he was able to enjoy football at a high level, as FP Halle-Gooik also participated in the Futsal Champions League.

== Honours ==
=== Player ===
RSC Anderlecht

- Belgian First Division: 1980–81, 1984–85, 1985–86, 1986–87
- Belgian Cup: 1974-75, 1975–76, 1987–88, 1988–89
- Belgian Supercup: 1985, 1987
- European Cup Winners' Cup: 1975–76 (winners), 1976-77 (runners-up), 1977–78 (winners)
- European Super Cup: 1976, 1978
- UEFA Cup: 1982–83 (winners), 1983-84 (runners-up)
- Amsterdam Tournament: 1976
- Jules Pappaert Cup: 1977, 1983, 1985
- Belgian Sports Merit Award: 1978
- Bruges Matins: 1985, 1988

==== RFC Liège ====
- Belgian Cup: 1989-90

==== Standard de Liège ====
- Belgian Cup: 1992-93

=== Goalkeeper coach ===
- Kampioen van België – Champion de Belgique – Belgian Champion
  - 2000, 2001, 2004, 2006, 2007 (RSC Anderlecht)
- Belgische Super Cup – Super Coupe de Belgique – Belgian Super Cup
  - 2000, 2001, 2006, 2007
- Kwalificatie Champions League – Qualification Champions League
  - 2000, 2001, 2002, 2003, 2004, 2005 2nd Round : 2001
- Europees Kampioenschap – Championnat d'Europe – European Championship
  - EURO 2000 (Belgium – Netherlands)
- Wereldbeker – Coupe du Monde – World Cup
  - 2002 (Japan – South Korea)
- Olympische Zomerspelen – Jeux olympiques d'été – Summer Olympics
  - 2008 (China – Beijing) – National Team of Belgium U21 (4th place)
