= Dirk Vekeman =

Belgian footballer (1960–2013)

- Vekeman with Anderlecht in 1985

Personal information
- Full name: Dirk Vekeman
- Date of birth: 25 September 1960
- Place of birth: Uccle, Belgium
- Date of death: 5 May 2013 (aged 52)
- Place of death: Dworp, Belgium
- Position: Goalkeeper

Youth career
- 1975–1979: Anderlecht

Senior career*
Years	Team	Apps	(Gls)
1979–1987	Anderlecht		
1987–1988	Racing Jet		
1988–1989	RWDM		
1989–1995	F.C. Boom		
- * Club domestic league appearances and goals

Dirk Vekeman (25 September 1960 – 5 May 2013) was a Belgian football player.

== Club career ==
He came through the youth ranks at R.S.C. Anderlecht and played 35 matches for their senior team. He was their second goalkeeper for several years behind Nico de Bree and then Jacky Munaron, before season-long spells at fellow Brussels teams Racing Jet and RWDM. He finished his career at F.C. Boom, with whom he clinched promotion to the Eerste klasse in 1992.

== Honours ==
=== Player ===
Anderlecht

- Belgian First Division: 1980–81, 1984–85, 1985–86, 1986–87
- Belgian Supercup: 1985, 1987
- UEFA Cup: 1982–83 (winners), 1983–84 (runners-up)
- Jules Pappaert Cup: 1983, 1985
- Bruges Matins: 1985

==== FC Boom ====
- Belgian Second Division: 1991–92
