= Hugo Broos =

Belgian football manager and former player

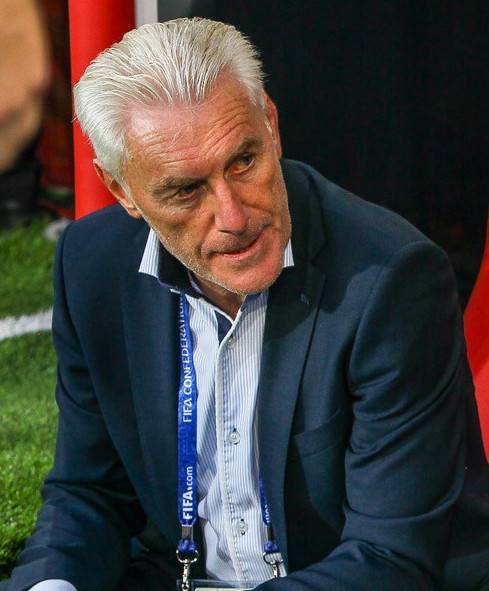
- Broos coaching Cameroon at the 2017 FIFA Confederations Cup

Personal information
- Full name: Hugo Henri Broos
- Date of birth: 10 April 1952 (age 74)
- Place of birth: Humbeek, Belgium
- Height: 1.80 m (5 ft 11 in)
- Position: Defender

Senior career*
Years	Team	Apps	(Gls)
1970–1983	Anderlecht	350	(1)
1983–1988	Club Brugge	161	(1)
Total		511	(2)

International career
1974–1986	Belgium	24	(0)

Managerial career
- 1988–1991: RWD Molenbeek
- 1991–1997: Club Brugge
- 1997–2002: Excelsior Mouscron
- 2002–2005: Anderlecht
- 2005–2008: Genk
- 2008–2009: Panserraikos
- 2009: Trabzonspor
- 2010–2011: Zulte Waregem
- 2014: JS Kabylie
- 2014–2015: NA Hussein Dey
- 2016–2017: Cameroon
- 2019: Oostende (caretaker)
- 2021–2026: South Africa
Medal record
Men's football
Representing Cameroon (as manager)
Africa Cup of Nations
Winner	2017
Representing South Africa (as manager)
Africa Cup of Nations
Third place	2023
- * Club domestic league appearances and goals

Hugo Henri Broos (born 10 April 1952) is a Belgian professional former football player and manager.

== Playing career ==
He started his football career in his hometown Humbeek, playing for KFC Humbeek and was discovered at the early age of eighteen by a scout from RSC Anderlecht. For more than ten years he was their central defender and helped them win three European trophies, three national championships and four Belgian Cups. Between 1974 and 1986 he represented Belgium, gaining 24 caps and finishing fourth at the World Cup in Mexico in 1986. In 1983 Broos switched teams and started playing for Club Brugge. He played there for five seasons until season 1987–88. During this period he helped his team gain the Belgian Cup in 1986 and the championship in 1988. In 1988 Broos retired as a professional footballer.

In his career as a football player he won the Belgian Cup five times.

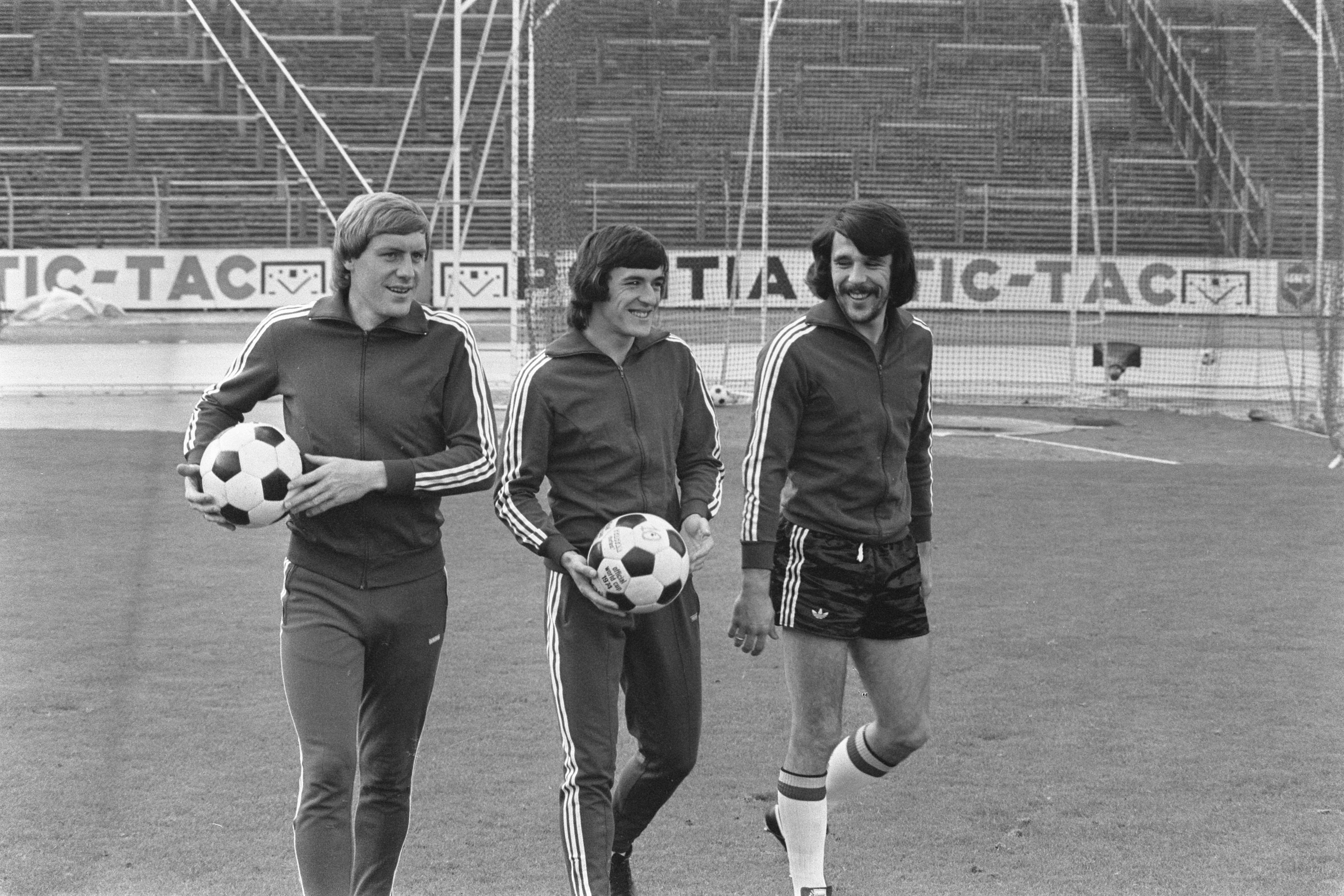
Broos (left) with Belgium teammates François Van der Elst and Eric Gerets in 1977

== Managerial career ==
From 1991 to 1998 Broos coached Club Brugge, winning the championship twice in 1992 and 1996. He also won the Belgian Cup in 1991, 1995 and 1996. From 2002 until 2005 he coached Anderlecht. He got the team into the Champions League and his team won the 2003–04 season championship. The following 2004–05 season was a turning point however, and the team were knocked out of the Champions League and the Belgian Cup. After a 0–0 result against Gent, Broos was fired for the first time in his career. Later that year in June, he became coach for KRC Genk and got back at his former team on 30 September by beating them 4–1. During the 2007–08 season Broos left Genk.

Broos won the prestigious Belgian Coach of the Year award four times in his career, twice while coaching Club Brugge (1992 and 1996), once with Anderlecht in 2004, and with KRC Genk in 2007. On 15 December 2008, Broos became coach of Greek club Panserraikos, and for the first time in his career, coached outside his home country. Panserraikos had a good campaign in Greek Cup, eliminating Panathinaikos in the quarter-finals but losing to AEK Athens in the semi-finals. Later in season Panserraikos couldn't avoid relegation. Broos left Panserraikos and became new coach of Trabzonspor on 22 June 2009 and was released on 22 November 2009. After that he was head coach of Zulte Waregem for half a season, before becoming assistant coach of Al Jazira Club.

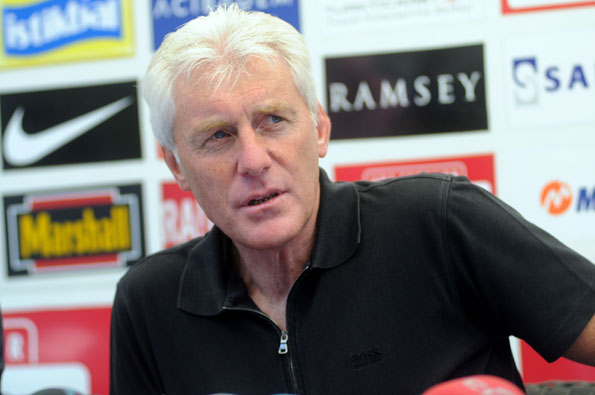
Broos as coach of Trabzonspor in 2009

He was sacked in 2012 and became manager of the national team of Cameroon. He led the team to victory in the 2017 Africa Cup of Nations. He took the role of sporting director of K.V. Oostende after being laid-off as Cameroon's coach in February 2018.

On 5 May 2021, he was appointed manager of the South Africa national team. He led South Africa to a third-place finish at the 2023 Africa Cup of Nations. In October 2025, Broos ran a successful campaign of leading South Africa in qualifying for the 2026 FIFA World Cup. Shortly after, he announced that he would retire from coaching after the 2026 FIFA World Cup.

On the opening day of the 2026 World Cup, Broos became the oldest coach to manage a World Cup team. However, merely five hours after South Africa's match ended, Miroslav Koubek broke the record by 222 days, and, less than three days later, the title was passed to Dick Advocaat of the Curaçao national team, who surpassed Koubek by roughly four years. He led South Africa to a 1–0 victory over South Korea in the third group-stage match, securing the country's first-ever qualification for the World Cup knockout phase as group runners-up. At 74 years and 75 days old, he became the oldest coach in FIFA World Cup history to win a match, surpassing the previous record held by Carlos Queiroz earlier in the tournament. Broos retired from coaching after the tournament.

== Player statistics ==
Appearances and goals by club, season and competition
Club	Season	League			National cup		Other		Europe		Total	
Club	Season	Division	Apps	Goals	Apps	Goals	Apps	Goals	Apps	Goals	Apps	Goals
RSC Anderlecht	1970–71	Belgian First Division	6	0	—		—		—		6	0
RSC Anderlecht	1971–72	Belgian First Division	28	0	6	0	—		1 (Note: Appearances in UEFA Cup)	0	35	0
RSC Anderlecht	1972–73	Belgian First Division	23	0	5	0	—		3 (Note: Appearances in European Champion Clubs' Cup)	0	31	0
RSC Anderlecht	1973–74	Belgian First Division	29	0	4	0	2 (Note: Appearances in Belgian League Cup)	0	2 (Note: Appearances in UEFA Cup Winners' Cup)	0	37	0
RSC Anderlecht	1974–75	Belgian First Division	38	0	6	0	2	0	6	0	52	0
RSC Anderlecht	1975–76	Belgian First Division	23	0	3	0	—		5	0	31	0
RSC Anderlecht	1976–77	Belgian First Division	34	1	4	0	—		11 (Note: 9 appearances in UEFA Cup Winners' Cup, 2 appearances in UEFA Super Cup)	0	49	1
RSC Anderlecht	1977–78	Belgian First Division	34	0	4	0	—		9	0	47	0
RSC Anderlecht	1978–79	Belgian First Division	33	0	6	0	—		3 (Note: 2 appearances in UEFA Cup Winners' Cup, 1 appearance in UEFA Super Cup)	0	42	0
RSC Anderlecht	1979–80	Belgian First Division	20	0	4	0	—		1	0	25	0
RSC Anderlecht	1980–81	Belgian First Division	32	1	2	0	—		1	0	36	1
RSC Anderlecht	1981–82	Belgian First Division	34	0	3	0	—		8	0	45	0
RSC Anderlecht	1982–83	Belgian First Division	17	0	1	0	—		4	0	22	0
RSC Anderlecht	Total		351	2	48	0	4	0	55	0	458	2
Club Brugge	1983–84	Belgian First Division	34	0	3	0	—		—		37	0
Club Brugge	1984–85	Belgian First Division	33	0	4	0	—		4	0	41	0
Club Brugge	1985–86	Belgian First Division	33	1	9	0	2 (Note: Appearances in Championship play-off)	0	4	0	46	1
Club Brugge	1986–87	Belgian First Division	28	1	3	0	1 (Note: Appearances in Belgian Super Cup)	0	2	0	33	1
Club Brugge	1987–88	Belgian First Division	33	0	4	0	1	0	8	0	45	0
Club Brugge	Total		161	2	23	0	4	0	18	0	202	2
Career total			512	4	71	0	8	0	73	0	660	4

== Managerial statistics ==
As of match played 28 June 2026

Managerial record by team and tenure
Team	Nat.	From	To	Record					Ref.
Team	Nat.	From	To	G	W	D	L	Win %	Ref.
RWD Molenbeek	(Belgium)	July 1988	June 1991	70	21	13	36	30.00	
Club Brugge	(Belgium)	July 1991	June 1997	269	167	57	45	62.08	
Excelsior Mouscron	(Belgium)	July 1997	June 2002	197	92	42	63	46.70	
Anderlecht	(Belgium)	July 2002	February 2005	118	75	15	28	63.56	
Genk	(Belgium)	July 2005	February 2008	98	50	22	26	51.02	
Panserraikos	(Greece)	December 2008	June 2009	21	5	8	8	23.81	
Trabzonspor	(Turkey)	July 2009	November 2009	15	6	3	6	40.00	
Zulte Waregem	(Belgium)	October 2010	May 2011	25	8	7	10	32.00	
JS Kabylie	(Algeria)	July 2014	September 2014	5	3	1	1	60.00	
NA Hussein Dey	(Algeria)	November 2014	February 2015	11	4	3	4	36.36	
Cameroon	(Cameroon)	13 February 2016	4 December 2017	25	10	9	6	40.00	
Oostende (caretaker)	(Belgium)	March 2019	April 2019	8	2	2	4	25.00	
South Africa	(South Africa)	5 May 2021	11 July 2026	78	36	27	15	46.15	
Career Total				939	479	208	252	51.01	

== Honours ==
=== Player ===
Anderlecht

- Belgian First Division: 1971–72, 1973–74, 1980–81
- Belgian Cup: 1971–72, 1972–73, 1974–75, 1975–76
- Belgian League Cup: 1973, 1974
- European Cup Winners' Cup: 1975–76, 1977–78; runner-up 1976–77
- European Super Cup: 1976, 1978
- UEFA Cup: 1982–83
- Amsterdam Tournament: 1976
- Tournoi de Paris: 1977
- Jules Pappaert Cup: 1977, 1983
- Belgian Sports Merit Award: 1978

Club Brugge

- Belgian First Division: 1987–88
- Belgian Cup: 1985–86
- Belgian Super Cup: 1986
- Bruges Matins: 1984

Belgium

- FIFA World Cup fourth place: 1986

=== Manager ===
RWD Molenbeek

- Belgian Second Division: 1989–90

Club Brugge

- Belgian First Division: 1991–92, 1995–96
- Belgian Cup: 1994–95, 1995–96
- Belgian Super Cup: 1991, 1992, 1994, 1996

Anderlecht

- Belgian First Division: 2003–04

Cameroon

- Africa Cup of Nations: 2017

South Africa

- Africa Cup of Nations third place: 2023

=== Individual ===
- Belgian Professional Manager of the Year: 1991–92, 1995–96, 2003–04, 2006–07
- Honorary Citizen of Jabbeke and Grimbergen: 2017
