= Franky Vercauteren =

Belgian footballer

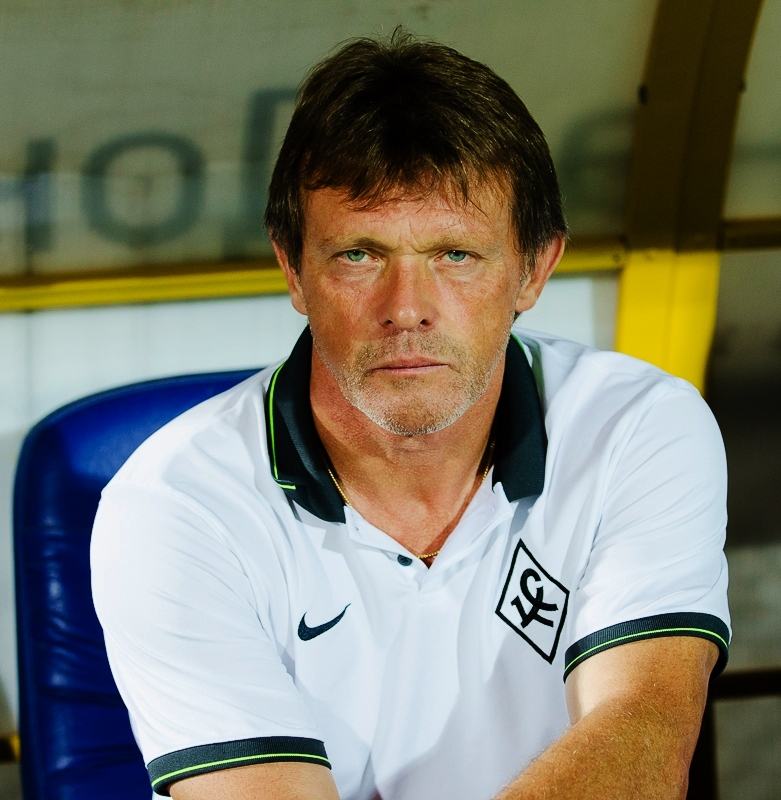
- Vercauteren with Krylia Sovetov

Personal information
- Full name: Frank Vercauteren
- Date of birth: 28 October 1956 (age 69)
- Place of birth: Molenbeek-Saint-Jean, Belgium
- Height: 1.74 m (5 ft 9 in)
- Position: Left winger

Youth career
- 1963–1975: Anderlecht

Senior career*
Years	Team	Apps	(Gls)
1975–1987	Anderlecht	367	(93)
1987–1990	Nantes	78	(19)
1987–1990	Nantes B	13	(4)
1990–1993	RWDM	50	(4)
Total		508	(120)

International career
1977–1988	Belgium	63	(9)

Managerial career
- 1993–1994: C.S. Braine (youth)
- 1994–1997: KV Mechelen (youth)
- 1997–1998: KV Mechelen
- 1998: Anderlecht (assistant)
- 1998–1999: Anderlecht (caretaker)
- 1999–2005: Anderlecht (assistant)
- 2005–2007: Anderlecht
- 2009: Belgium
- 2009–2011: Genk
- 2011–2012: Al Jazira
- 2012–2013: Sporting CP
- 2014: KV Mechelen
- 2014–2016: Krylia Sovetov
- 2017–2018: Cercle Brugge
- 2018: Al-Batin
- 2019: OH Leuven (sports advisor)
- 2019–2020: Anderlecht
- 2021: Antwerp
- * Club domestic league appearances and goals

François Vercauteren (born 28 October 1956), nicknamed "The Little Prince", is a Belgian former footballer who played as a left winger. He is currently the sports director of the Royal Belgian Football Association.

== Club career ==
Vercauteren made his first team debut for Anderlecht in 1975 against Racing Mechelen, replacing Gilbert Van Binst. A double surgery in October 1975 and January 1976, however, later slowed down his development. Vercauteren won the five European titles with Anderlecht (two European Cup Winners' Cups, one UEFA Cup and two European Supercups). He also won two Belgian Cups, four Belgian Championship titles and won the Belgian Supercup twice. In 1987, he joined Nantes in France and came back to Belgium three years later to play with Molenbeek until 1993. While at Nantes, Vercauteren finished twice the championship with the most assists.

== International career ==
Vercauteren played 63 times with the Belgium national team. He was part of the squad that finished fourth at the 1986 FIFA World Cup, and also featured in the 1982 World Cup and at UEFA Euro 1984. Though he made his national team debut on 16 November 1977 (a 3–0 defeat to Northern Ireland national football team), he was not selected for the Euro 1980, where Belgium finished runner-up to West Germany.

== Coaching career ==
At the end of his playing career, Vercauteren became the trainer of the youth team from C.S. Braine, a small club in Walloon Brabant. A year after, he moved to KV Mechelen, where he first trained the youth team, then the first team, beginning in 1997–98. At the end of this season, he signed as an assistant manager at his first club as a player, Anderlecht. He was briefly named manager along with his fellow Jean Dockx in the 1998–99 season after a disappointing start by manager Arie Haan (Anderlecht fell to the 18th and last place in the beginning of the season). The two men secured among others a nice 0–6 win at Sclessin against old rival Standard Liège and a 2–5 win at Genk, to finish in the European places.

Anderlecht then hired Aimé Anthuenis as a manager, and Vercauteren became assistant once again. After coach Hugo Broos (the successor of Anthuenis) was dismissed in February 2005, Vercauteren signed on as the new manager and won twice the Belgian Championship. On 12 November 2007, after a string of poor and indifferent results, Vercauteren and Anderlecht parted company, with assistant coach Ariel Jacobs taking over until the end of the season.

From 9 April 2009 to 10 September 2009, Vercauteren served as caretaker manager for the Belgium national team, resigning after Belgium's defeat to Armenia on 9 September 2009; he was replaced by the Dutchman Dick Advocaat. On 3 December 2009, Vercauteren signed a contract as head coach for Genk. On 17 May 2011, he celebrated winning the 2010–11 Belgian Pro League championship with Genk after a 1–1 home draw against Standard Liège. He also won the 2011 Belgian Super Cup over Standard, and led his club into the qualifying play-off for the 2011–12 UEFA Champions League.

On 8 August 2011, Vercauteren signed a contract as head coach of Emirati side Al Jazira. On 11 March 2012, Al Jazira announced that they had parted company with Vercauteren. They stated the reason behind the controversial exit of Vercauteren was because he was not getting on with the players. On the same day, he was replaced by Caio Júnior.

Vercauteren joined Sporting CP in November 2012, but was sacked after two months, with the club winning just two games during his tenure.

Vercauteren then took over Russian club Krylia Sovetov in the summer of 2014, following the club's relegation from the Russian Premier League. Krylia had spent every one of its 22 previous seasons on the top level. Under Vercauteren's management, Krylia Sovetov won the 2014–15 Russian Football National League and were promoted back to the Premier League.

In 2018, Vercauteren won promotion to the Belgian First Division A with his club Cercle Brugge. He then signed a contract with Saudi club Al-Batin.

On 3 October 2019, Vercauteren rejoined Anderlecht. On 17 August 2020, Vercauteren left the club after Anderlecht player Vincent Kompany decided to end his playing career and become a trainer.

The RBFA announced the appointment of Vercauteren as sports director on 8 February 2023.

== Managerial statistics ==
As of match played 27 December 2019

Managerial record by team and tenure
Team	From	To	Record				
Team	From	To	P	W	D	L	Win %
Anderlecht	3 October 2019	17 August 2020	13	5	6	2	38.5

== Honours ==
=== Player ===
Anderlecht

- Belgian First Division: 1980–81, 1984–85, 1985–86, 1986–87
- Belgian Cup: 1975–76
- Belgian Supercup: 1985, 1987
- European Cup Winners' Cup: 1975–76, 1977–78; runners-up 1976–77
- European Super Cup: 1976, 1978
- UEFA Cup: 1982–83; runners-up 1983–84
- Amsterdam Tournament: 1976
- Tournoi de Paris: 1977
- Jules Pappaert Cup: 1977, 1983, 1985
- Belgian Sports Merit Award: 1978
- Bruges Matins: 1985

Belgium

- FIFA World Cup: 1986 (fourth place)

=== Manager ===
Anderlecht

- Belgian First Division: 2005–06, 2006–07
- Belgian Supercup: 2006, 2007

Genk

- Belgian First Division: 2010–11
- Belgian Supercup: 2011

Krylia Sovetov

- National Football League: 2014–15

Cercle Brugge

- Promotion to Belgian First Division A: 2017–18

=== Individual ===
- Belgian Golden Shoe: 1983
- Ballon d'Or nomination: 1983
- Belgian Professional Manager of the Year: 2010–11
- Meritorious resident of Dilbeek: 2011
- Pro League Hall of Fame: 2026
