= Johnny Dusbaba =

Dutch footballer (born 1956)

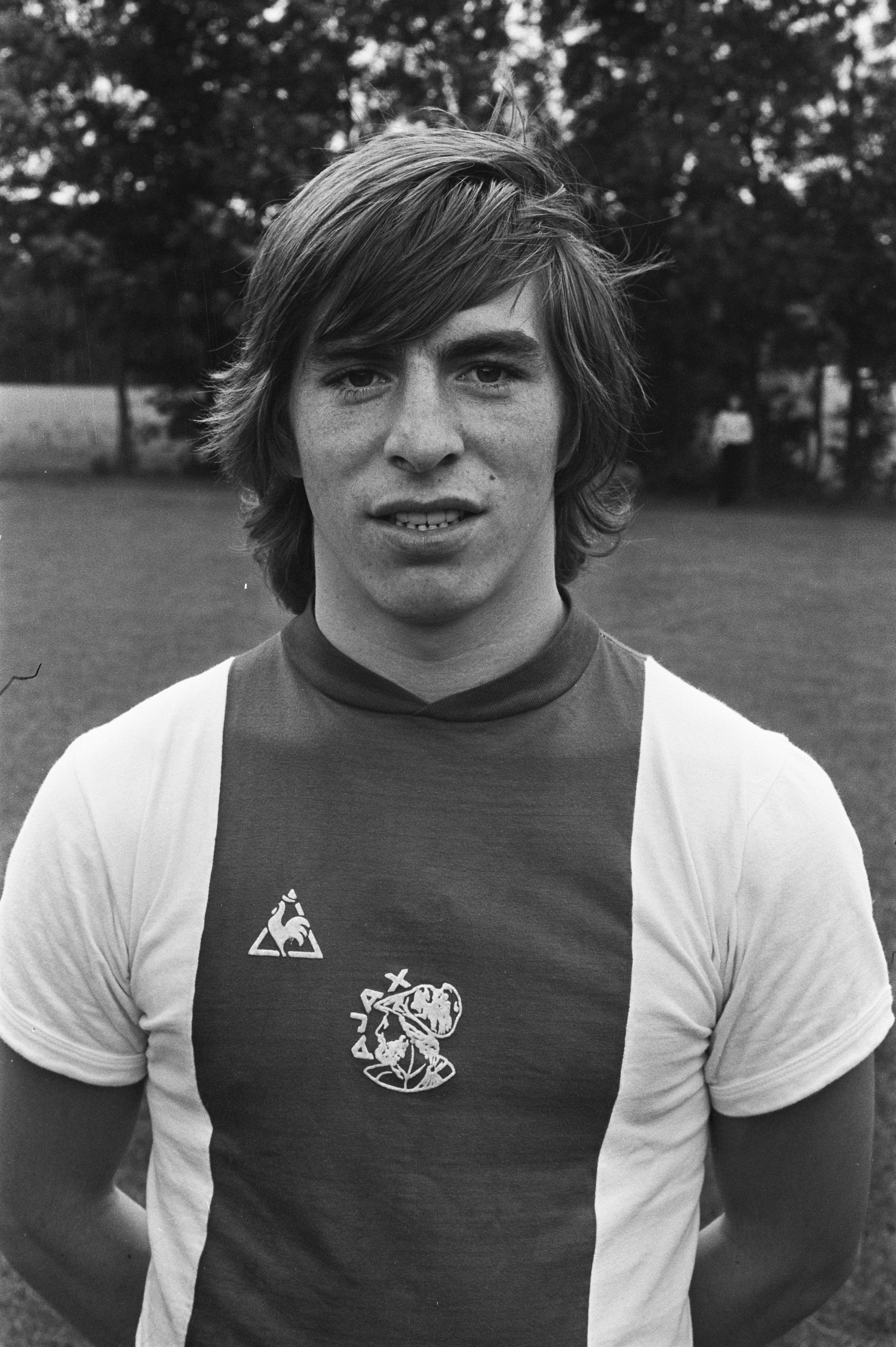
- Dusbaba in 1975

Personal information
- Date of birth: 14 March 1956 (age 70)
- Place of birth: The Hague, Netherlands
- Position: Defender

Senior career*
Years	Team	Apps	(Gls)
1973–1974	FC Den Haag	33	(0)
1974–1977	Ajax	93	(2)
1977–1981	Anderlecht	117	(1)
1981–1982	Standard Liège	16	(0)
1982–1984	NAC	36	(2)
1984–1986	Sint-Niklaas	31	(0)
Total		326	(5)

International career
1977	Netherlands U21	4	(1)
1977–1978	Netherlands	4	(0)
- * Club domestic league appearances and goals

Johnny Dusbaba (born 14 March 1956) is a Dutch retired footballer who played for Ajax and Anderlecht among others, as well as the Dutch national side.

== Club career ==
Born in the Schilderswijk in The Hague to a fairground operator, Dusbaba started his career at hometown club FC Den Haag, before joining Hans Kraay-coached Dutch giants Ajax in 1974. A tough, but somewhat careless defender, he moved abroad to play in Belgium for Anderlecht alongside compatriots Peter Ressel, Arie Haan and Rob Rensenbrink and later for Standard Liège. With Anderlecht he won the 1977–78 European Cup Winners' Cup. After spending time at NAC, he finished his career at Sint-Niklaas.

== International career ==
Dusbaba made his debut for the Netherlands in an August 1977 FIFA World Cup qualification match against Iceland and earned a total of 4 caps, scoring no goals. His final international was an October 1978 UEFA Euro qualification match against Switzerland. He was a preliminary member for the 1978 FIFA World Cup, but was not part of the final squad. He later cited his fear of flying and the volatile situation in Argentina to be the reasons.

== Personal life ==
During his playing career, Dusbaba was known for selling various items such as fur coats, video recorders and TVs from the trunk of his car. He also used Anderlecht's equipment room as a shop selling the same items. After retiring as a player, he owned a fashion shop in Oostende.

== Honours ==
Ajax Amsterdam

- Eredivisie: 1976-77

RSC Anderlecht

- Belgian First Division: 1980–81
- European Cup Winners' Cup: 1977–78 (winners)
- European Super Cup: 1978
- Jules Pappaert Cup: 1977
- Tournoi de Paris: 1977
- Belgian Sports Merit Award: 1978

Standard Liège

- Belgian First Division: 1981–82
- Belgian Supercup:1981
- European Cup Winners' Cup: 1981-82 (runners-up)
