= 1978 European Cup Winners' Cup final =

- Match programme cover
- Event: 1977–78 European Cup Winners' Cup
Anderlecht	Austria Wien
(Belgium)	(Austria)
4	0
- Date: 3 May 1978
- Venue: Parc des Princes, Paris
- Referee: Heinz Aldinger (West Germany)
- Attendance: 48,679

The 1978 European Cup Winners' Cup Final was a football match contested between Anderlecht of Belgium and Austria Wien of Austria. It was the final match of the 1977–78 European Cup Winners' Cup and the 18th European Cup Winners' Cup final. The final was held at Parc des Princes in Paris, France, on 3 May 1978. The venue was selected in Bern by the UEFA Executive Committee on 20 September 1977. Anderlecht won the match 4–0 thanks to two goals each by Rob Rensenbrink and Gilbert Van Binst.

It was Anderlecht's third consecutive appearance in the final; they won the competition in 1976 and were runners-up in 1977.

== Route to the final ==
(Belgium) Anderlecht					Austria Wien			
Opponent	Agg.	1st leg	2nd leg		Opponent	Agg.	1st leg	2nd leg
(Bulgaria) Lokomotiv Sofia	8–1	6–1 (A)	2–0 (H)	First round	(Wales) Cardiff City	1–0	0–0 (A)	1–0 (H)
(West Germany) Hamburger SV	3–2	2–1 (A)	1–1 (H)	Second round	(Czechoslovakia) Lokomotíva Košice	1–1 (a)	0–0 (H)	1–1 (A)
(Portugal) Porto	3–1	0–1 (A)	3–0 (H)	Quarter-finals	(Socialist Federal Republic of Yugoslavia) Hajduk Split	2–2 (3–0 p)	1–1 (A)	1–1 (a.e.t.) (H)
(Netherlands) Twente	3–0	1–0 (A)	2–0 (H)	Semi-finals	(Soviet Union) Dynamo Moscow	3–3 (5–4 p)	2–1 (H)	1–2 (a.e.t.) (A)

== Match details ==
3 May 1978

Anderlecht (Belgium)	4–0	Austria Wien
Rensenbrink 13', 44'; Van Binst 45', 82'	Report

Parc des Princes, Paris
Attendance: 48,679
Referee: Heinz Aldinger (West Germany)

Anderlecht	Austria Wien

GK	1	(Netherlands) Nico de Bree
DF	2	(Belgium) Gilbert Van Binst
DF	3	(Belgium) Hugo Broos	Yellow card
DF	4	(Netherlands) Johnny Dusbaba
DF	5	(Belgium) Jean Thissen
MF	6	(Belgium) Franky Vercauteren		(substituted off) 87'
FW	7	(Belgium) François Van der Elst
MF	8	(Netherlands) Arie Haan
FW	9	(Denmark) Benny Nielsen
MF	10	(Belgium) Ludo Coeck
FW	11	(Netherlands) Rob Rensenbrink (c)
Substitutes:
MF	12	(Belgium) Jean Dockx		(substituted on) 87'
Manager:
(Belgium) Raymond Goethals

GK	1	(Austria) Hubert Baumgartner
DF	2	(Austria) Robert Sara (c)
DF	3	(Austria) Erich Obermayer
DF	4	(Austria) Ernst Baumeister
MF	5	(Austria) Karl Daxbacher		(substituted off) 60'
DF	6	(Austria) Josef Sara	Yellow card
FW	7	(Austria) Thomas Parits
MF	8	(Austria) Herbert Prohaska
FW	9	(Austria) Hans Pirkner
MF	10	(Austria) Felix Gasselich
FW	11	(Uruguay) Julio Morales		(substituted off) 74'
Substitutes:
MF		(Uruguay) Alberto Martínez		(substituted on) 60'
FW		(Austria) Fritz Drazan		(substituted on) 74'
Manager:
(Austria) Hermann Stessl

== See also ==
- 1978 European Cup Final
- 1978 UEFA Cup Final
- R.S.C. Anderlecht in European football
