= 1978 European Super Cup =

- On site program
Anderlecht	Liverpool
(Belgium)	(England)
4	3
- on aggregate

First leg
Anderlecht	Liverpool
3	1
- Date: 4 December 1978
- Venue: Emile Versé Stadium, Brussels
- Referee: Károly Palotai (Hungary)
- Attendance: 35,000

Second leg
Liverpool	Anderlecht
2	1
- Date: 19 December 1978
- Venue: Anfield, Liverpool
- Referee: Nicolae Rainea (Romania)
- Attendance: 23,598

The 1978 European Super Cup was a football match played over two legs between Liverpool of England and Anderlecht of Belgium. The first leg was played at the Emile Versé Stadium, Brussels on 4 December 1978 and the second leg was played on 19 December 1978 at Anfield, Liverpool. It was the annual European Super Cup contested between the winners of the European Cup and the European Cup Winners' Cup. Liverpool were the reigning champions, while Anderlecht were appearing in the competition for the second time after winning the 1976 edition.

The teams qualified for the competition by winning the European Cup and European Cup Winners' Cup. Anderlecht won the 1977–78 European Cup Winners' Cup beating Austrian team Austria Wien 4–0 in the final. Liverpool qualified by winning the 1977–78 European Cup. They beat Belgian team Club Brugge 1–0 in the final.

Watched by a crowd of 35,000 at the Emile Versé Stadium, Anderlecht took an early lead in the first half of the first leg when Franky Vercauteren and François Van der Elst scored. Liverpool midfielder Jimmy Case scored in between the Anderlecht goals. Anderlecht extended their lead in the second half courtesy of a Rob Rensenbrink goal to secure a 3–1 victory. A crowd of 23,598 saw Liverpool take the lead in the second leg at Anfield, when Emlyn Hughes scored. Anderlecht equalised in the second half when Van der Elst scored. A late goal by David Fairclough meant Liverpool won the second leg 2–1. Thus, Anderlecht won the tie 4–3 on aggregate to secure their second Super Cup triumph.

== Background ==
The European Super Cup was founded in the early 1970s, as a means to determine the best team in Europe and serve as a challenge to Ajax, the strongest club side of its day. The proposal by Dutch journalist Anton Witkamp, a football match between the holders of the European Cup and Cup Winners' Cup, failed to receive UEFA's backing, given the recent Cup Winners' Cup winners Rangers had been banned from European competition. (Note: In 1972, Rangers was banned from European competition for two years after fans clashed with Spanish police while celebrating the club's victory over Dynamo Moscow in the European Cup Winners' Cup Final. The ban was later reduced to one year on appeal.) Witkamp nonetheless proceeded with his vision, a two-legged match played between Ajax and Rangers in January 1973. The competition was endorsed and recognised by UEFA a year later.

Anderlecht qualified for the Super Cup by winning the 1977–78 European Cup Winners' Cup. They beat Austrian team Austria Wien 4–0 in the final. The result meant Anderlecht won the competition for the second time after the first victory in 1976. Anderlecht were appearing in the competition for the second time after they won the 1976 edition.

Liverpool qualified for the competition as winners of the 1977–78 European Cup. They defeated Belgian team Club Brugge 1–0 in the 1978 to win the European Cup for the second consecutive season. They were the current holders of the Super Cup after beating German team Hamburger SV in the previous season's competition.

Both teams had exited the respective European competitions they were competing in before the competition. Anderlecht were eliminated in the second round of the 1978–79 European Cup Winners' Cup by eventual winners Barcelona. Anderlecht won the first leg 3–0, but a 3–0 victory by Barcelona in the second leg meant the tie went to extra-time and a subsequent penalty shootout, which they lost 4–1. Liverpool were competing in the 1978–79 European Cup and were eliminated in the first round by the eventual winners Nottingham Forest of England in the first round. Forest won the first leg 2–0 and a 0–0 draw in the second leg saw them progress at Liverpool's expense.

== First leg ==
=== Summary ===
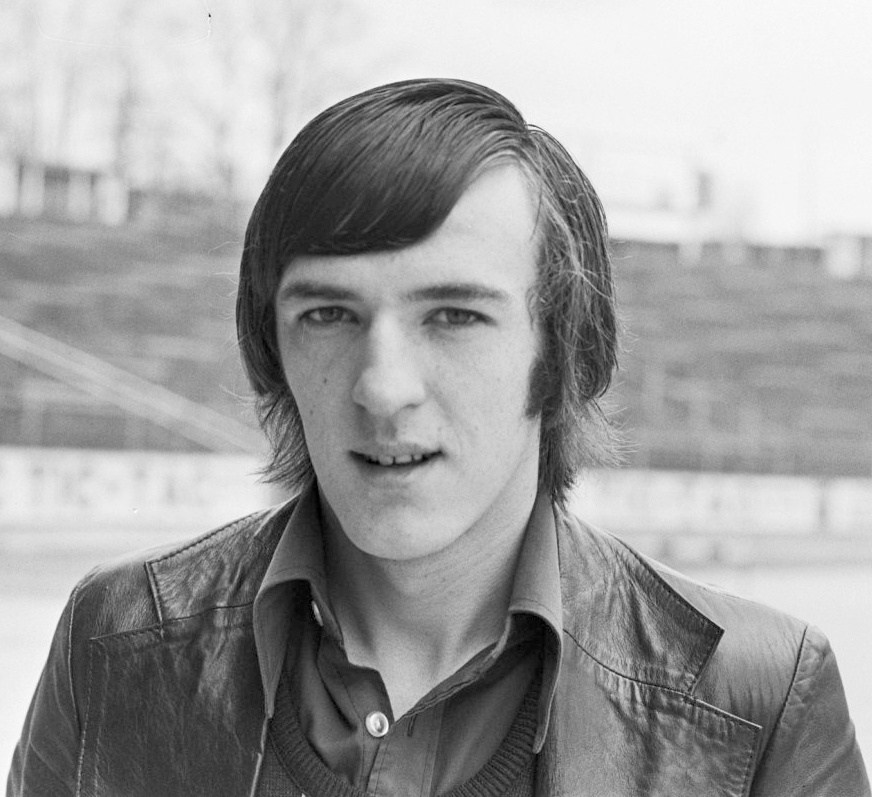
François Van der Elst, who scored Anderlecht's second goal in the first leg.

The first leg was held at the Emile Versé Stadium, the home ground of Anderlecht. It was the home side that opened the scoring in the 17th minute. Striker Rob Rensenbrink advanced down the right-hand side of the pitch and passed the ball across the Liverpool penalty area towards midfielder Franky Vercauteren who headed the ball into the Liverpool goal. Five minutes later, Anderlecht came close to extending their lead, but Benny Nielsen's shot was saved by Liverpool goalkeeper Ray Clemence. Liverpool started to exert themselves upon the match following this and equalised in the 27th minute when midfielder Jimmy Case scored from the edge of the Anderlecht penalty area. Five minutes before half-time Anderlecht extended their lead. Defender François Van der Elst found space in the Liverpool defence and his shot beat Clemence in the Liverpool goal to give Anderlecht a 2–1 lead. Anderlecht defender Jean Thissen was shown a yellow card before the end of the half for a late tackle on Liverpool striker Kenny Dalglish.

Anderlecht began the second half the better of the two sides as they pushed forward in an attempt to extend their lead. Rensenbrink, in particular, was in good form as he caused numerous problems for Liverpool defender Emlyn Hughes, who started because of an injury to Phil Thompson after being absent himself for a lengthy period. Liverpool replaced David Johnson with midfielder Steve Heighway in an attempt to get back into the match but it was to no avail as Anderlecht extended their lead late in the second half when Rensenbrink scored. No further goals were scored and the referee Károly Palotai blew for full-time with the final score 3–1 to Anderlecht.

Liverpool manager Bob Paisley was critical of his team's performance in the first leg: "We threw it away, our attitude was wrong and we were careless. Anderlecht are a great team going forward, but we never attacked them as we should. Our approach seems to have gone a bit wrong and we've lost our scoring touch where earlier in the season our finishing was great."

=== Details ===
4 December 1978
20:00 CET

Anderlecht (Belgium)	3–1	(England) Liverpool
Vercauteren 17'; Van der Elst 38'; Rensenbrink 87'	Report	Case 27'

Emile Versé Stadium, Brussels
Attendance: 35,000
Referee: Károly Palotai (Hungary)

Anderlecht	Liverpool

GK	1	(Netherlands) Nico de Bree
DF	2	(Belgium) François Van der Elst
DF	3	(Belgium) Hugo Broos
DF	4	(Netherlands) Johnny Dusbaba
DF	5	(Belgium) Jean Thissen	(yellow card) 45'
MF	6	(Belgium) Franky Vercauteren
FW	7	(Denmark) Benny Nielsen
MF	8	(Netherlands) Ruud Geels
MF	9	(Netherlands) Arie Haan
MF	10	(Belgium) Ludo Coeck
FW	11	(Netherlands) Rob Rensenbrink (c)
Substitutes:
GK	12	(Belgium) Jacky Munaron
FW	13	(Belgium) Ronny Martens
DF	14	(Belgium) Gilbert Van Binst
MF	15	(Netherlands) Matty van Toorn
Manager:
(Belgium) Raymond Goethals

GK	1	(England) Ray Clemence
RB	2	(England) Phil Neal
LB	3	(England) Alan Kennedy
CB	4	(England) Emlyn Hughes (c)
LM	5	(England) Ray Kennedy
CB	6	(Scotland) Alan Hansen
CF	7	(Scotland) Kenny Dalglish
RM	8	(England) Jimmy Case
CF	9	(England) David Johnson	(substituted off) 54'
CM	10	(England) Terry McDermott
CM	11	(Scotland) Graeme Souness
Substitutes:
MF	12	(Republic of Ireland) Steve Heighway	(substituted on) 54'
GK	13	(England) Steve Ogrizovic
FW	14	(England) David Fairclough
MF	15	(England) Sammy Lee
DF	16	(England) Brian Kettle
Manager:
(England) Bob Paisley

== Second leg ==
=== Summary ===
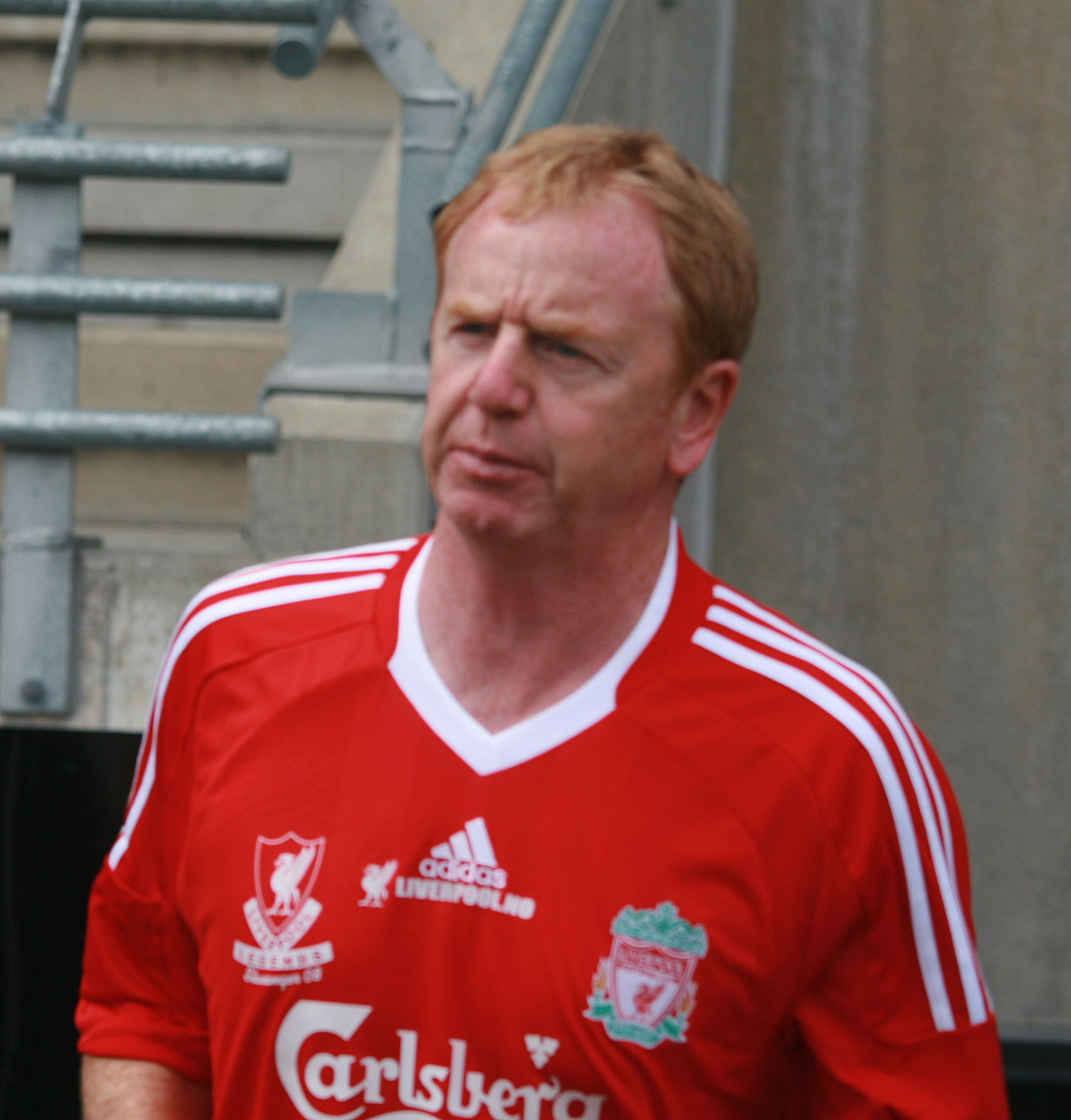
David Fairclough (pictured in 2008), who scored the last goal in the second leg.

Anderlecht's 3–1 victory in the first leg meant that Liverpool needed to score two goals to force the tie into extra-time. Despite heavy fog at Anfield, the match went ahead and Liverpool opened the scoring in the 13th minute. A shot by midfielder Jimmy Case was saved by Anderlecht goalkeeper Nico de Bree, but the ball rebounded to Emlyn Hughes who scored to give Liverpool a 1–0 lead. Following the goal, the Liverpool fans chanted "Oggy, Oggy tell us who scored" towards goalkeeper Ogrizovic, as the heavy fog made it difficult to identify players. Ogrizovic made a number of vital saves to keep Liverpool's hopes alive, saving from François Van der Elst and Rob Rensenbrink.

Liverpool continued to attack to try to score the goal they needed to level the tie, but they were unable to do so with chances not being converted, including a shot by Kenny Dalglish, which was saved by de Bree. Liverpool were made to pay for their missed chances in the 71st minute when Van der Elst scored. A series of passes between him and Rensenbrink saw him in space in the Liverpool penalty area and his shot went into the Liverpool goal to level the score at 1–1 and extend Anderlecht's lead in the tie to 4–2. Liverpool scored in the 87th minute when a pass by defender Phil Thompson was headed down by Dalglish to substitute David Fairclough who scored to make the score 2–1. However, Liverpool were unable to find the third goal they needed to send the match into extra time. Thus, despite losing the match 2–1, Anderlecht won the Super Cup 4–3 on aggregate to become the first club to win the Super Cup for the second time.

Following the match, referee Nicolae Rainea explained his decision to play the match despite heavy fog: "When I went out there before kick-off I decided I could see well enough and so I decided to play. I am afraid many spectators would not get a very clear view but there was no time I had any thoughts of abandoning the game." Liverpool manager Bob Paisley was critical of the decision to play the match: "You can't play football in conditions like that, it's ridiculous." Paisley suggested the competition should be played in April when the weather was better: "I think a match like this, between two leading team should be played in better weather, say in April. I know it's difficult, but it's farcical when good players like these have to slither about in fog and can't see each other."

=== Details ===
19 December 1978
19:30 GMT

Liverpool (England)	2–1	(Belgium) Anderlecht
Hughes 13'; Fairclough 87'	Report	Van der Elst 71'

Anfield, Liverpool
Attendance: 23,598
Referee: Nicolae Rainea (Romania)

Liverpool	Anderlecht

GK	1	(England) Steve Ogrizovic
RB	2	(England) Phil Neal
LB	3	(England) Emlyn Hughes (c)
CB	4	(England) Phil Thompson
LM	5	(England) Ray Kennedy
CB	6	(Scotland) Alan Hansen
CF	7	(Scotland) Kenny Dalglish
RM	8	(England) Jimmy Case
CF	9	(England) David Fairclough
CM	10	(England) Terry McDermott
CM	11	(Scotland) Graeme Souness
Substitutes:
FW	12	(England) David Johnson
GK	13	(England) Ray Clemence
MF	14	(Republic of Ireland) Steve Heighway
MF	15	(England) Sammy Lee
DF	16	(England) Brian Kettle
Manager:
(England) Bob Paisley

GK	1	(Netherlands) Nico de Bree
DF	2	(Belgium) Gilbert Van Binst
DF	3	(Netherlands) Matty van Toorn
DF	4	(Netherlands) Johnny Dusbaba
DF	5	(Belgium) Jean Thissen
MF	6	(Belgium) Franky Vercauteren
FW	7	(Belgium) François Van der Elst
MF	8	(Netherlands) Ruud Geels	(substituted off) 46'
MF	9	(Netherlands) Arie Haan
MF	10	(Belgium) Ludo Coeck
FW	11	(Netherlands) Rob Rensenbrink (c)
Substitutes:
FW		(Belgium) Ronny Martens	(substituted on) 46'
Manager:
(Belgium) Raymond Goethals

== Post-match ==
Anderlecht finished the 1978–79 Belgian First Division in second place, four points behind champions Beveren. Thus, they would compete in the 1979–80 UEFA Cup. Liverpool finished the 1978–79 First Division in first place, eight points clear of second-placed Nottingham Forest. Their domestic championship triumph meant they would compete in the European Cup the following season.

== See also ==
- 1978–79 European Cup
- 1978–79 European Cup Winners' Cup
- 1978–79 Liverpool F.C. season
- Liverpool F.C. in international football
- R.S.C. Anderlecht in European football
