= Jean Thissen =

Belgian footballer (born 1946)

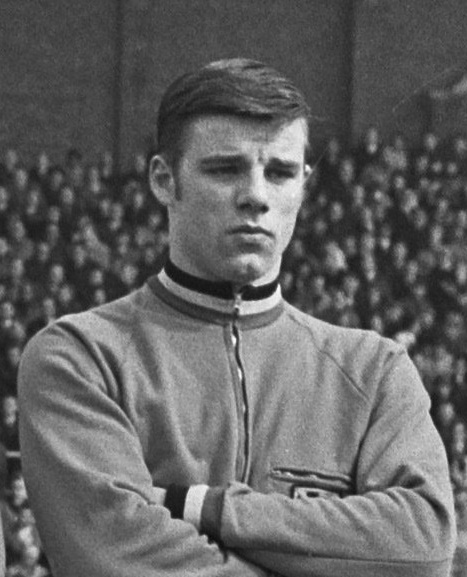
- Thissen in 1968

Personal information
- Date of birth: 21 April 1946 (age 80)
- Place of birth: Ensival, Belgium
- Position: Defender

Senior career*
Years	Team	Apps	(Gls)
1965–1974	Standard Liège		
1974–1979	Anderlecht		

International career
1968–1977	Belgium	34	(0)

Managerial career
- 1988–1990: Beira-Mar
- 1991: Servette
- 1992: Union Saint-Gilloise
- 1992–1994: Gabon
- 1994–1995: Raja Casablanca
- 1996–1998: Stade Tunisien
- 2000: Standard Liège
- 2004–2005: Virton
- 2007–2008: MC Alger
- 2009: Togo
- * Club domestic league appearances and goals

Jean Thissen (born 21 April 1946) is a Belgian retired football player and coach. He played as a defender for Standard Liège and Anderlecht. At international level, he made 34 appearances for the Belgium national team, participating in the 1970 FIFA World Cup and the UEFA Euro 1972. Thissen coached Beira-Mar, Servette, Union Saint-Gilloise, Gabon, Standard Liège, MC Alger and Togo.

== Honours ==
Standard Liège

- Belgian First Division: 1968–69, 1969–70, 1970–71
- Belgian Cup: 1965–66, 1966–67
- Jules Pappaert Cup: 1971

Anderlecht

- Belgian Cup: 1974–75, 1975–76
- Belgian League Cup: 1973, 1974
- European Cup Winners' Cup: 1975–76, 1977–78; runner-up 1976–77
- European Super Cup: 1976, 1978
- Amsterdam Tournament: 1976
- Tournoi de Paris: 1977
- Jules Pappaert Cup: 1977
- Belgian Sports Merit Award: 1978

Belgium

- UEFA European Championship third place: 1972
