= François Van der Elst =

Belgian footballer

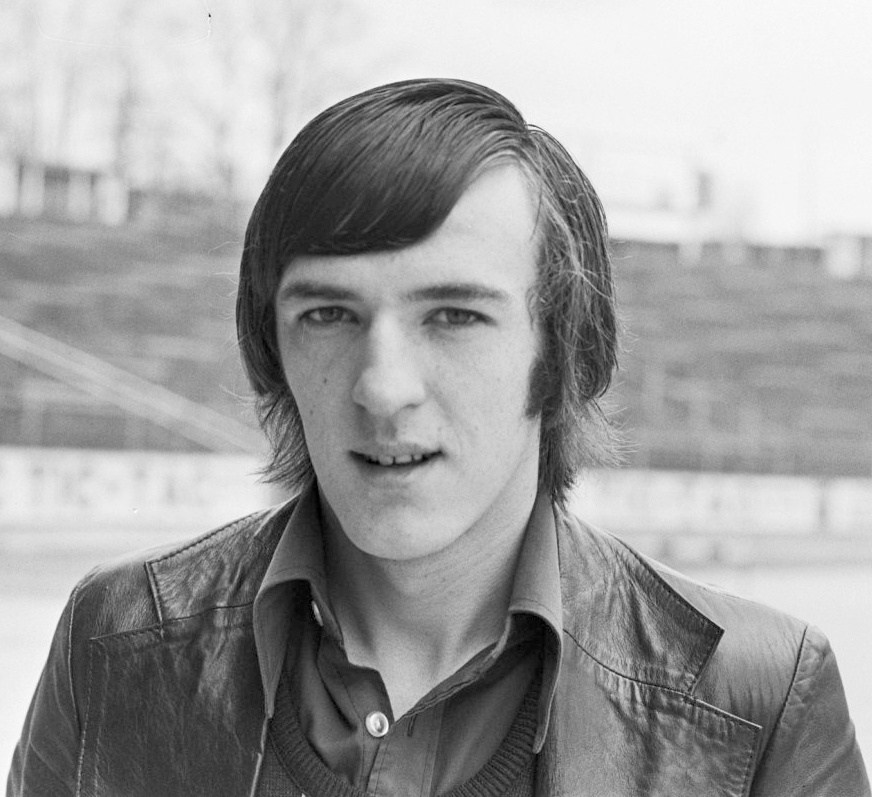
- Van der Elst in 1977

Personal information
- Date of birth: 1 December 1954
- Place of birth: Opwijk, Belgium
- Date of death: 11 January 2017 (aged 62)
- Place of death: Aalst, Belgium
- Height: 1.72 m (5 ft 8 in)
- Position: Winger

Youth career
- 1965–1969: VCE Mazenzele
- 1969–1971: Anderlecht

Senior career*
Years	Team	Apps	(Gls)
1971–1980	Anderlecht	243	(82)
1980–1981	New York Cosmos	43	(12)
1981–1983	West Ham United	62	(14)
1983–1986	Lokeren	57	(12)
Total		405	(120)

International career
1973–1983	Belgium	44	(14)
Medal record
Representing Belgium
UEFA European Championship
Runner-up	1980
- * Club domestic league appearances and goals

François Van der Elst (1 December 1954 – 11 January 2017) was a Belgian footballer, who played as a winger. He is mainly known for winning several national and European trophies while at R.S.C. Anderlecht.

== Early years ==
"Swat" Van der Elst was born in Opwijk, Flemish Brabant. In the youth series of the local team, he always played in midfield but particularly stood out for his dribbling and scoring skills.

== Club career ==
From 1969 to 1980 he played for Anderlecht. At the age of 16, he made his debut for the senior squad. Despite being drafted in different positions (forward, right winger or full-back), he would go on to total 82 Belgian Pro League goals, surpassing 100 overall. Van der Elst was praised for scoring decisive goals. In 1976, he was part of the 1975–76 European Cup Winners' Cup-winning squad, netting twice in the final against West Ham United (4–2) and, in the following season's league, was crowned the competition's top scorer at 21 goals as the Brussels side finished in second position. With Anderlecht, he eventually won two national titles and four cups between 1971 and 1980. Van der Elst won the European Cup Winners' Cup twice, in 1976 and 1978, scoring 18 goals in the competition, the 4th most of any player.

In January 1982, after a brief United States spell with the New York Cosmos, Van der Elst signed with West Ham United for £400,000, proceeding to score 17 times in 70 overall appearances. He continued his career back home, with K.S.C. Lokeren, but was forced to end it after a fibula fracture sustained at the start of the 1985–86 season.

== International career ==
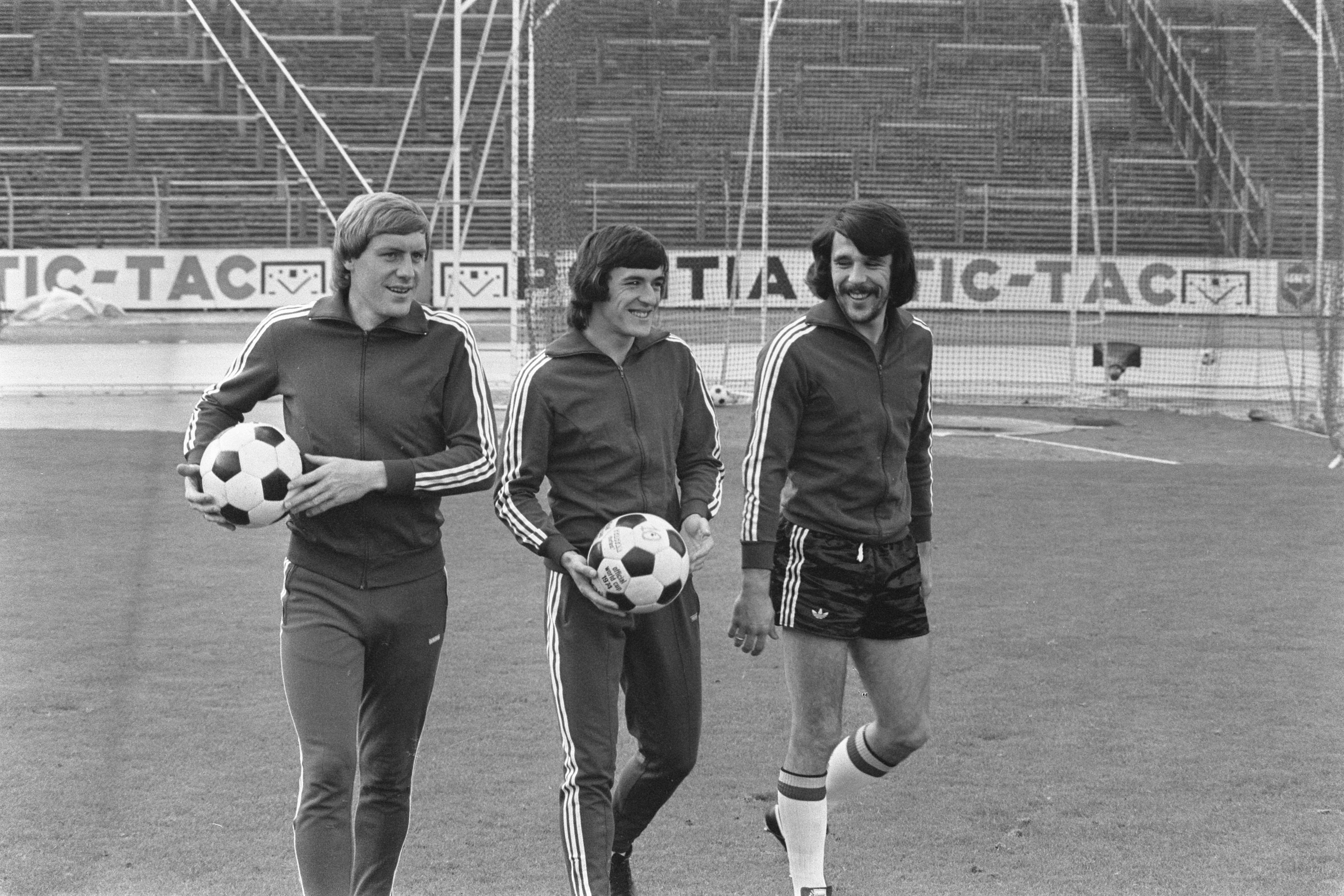
Hugo Broos, François Van der Elst and Eric Gerets during a training session of the national team, 1977

Van der Elst earned 44 caps and netted 14 goals for Belgium, helping the nation to the second place in the UEFA Euro 1980 tournament. He was part of the squad that competed at the 1982 FIFA World Cup, playing the second halves of the 1–0 win over El Salvador for the first group stage (in Elche) and the 0–3 loss to Poland for the second group phase (Barcelona).

== Personal life and death ==
Van der Elst's younger brother, Leo, was also a professional footballer. Both were Belgium internationals.

After his career, Van der Elst owned a snooker and billiards bar in his hometown of Opwijk. On New Year's Day 2017, Van der Elst suffered heart failure and was placed in an induced coma in intensive care. Ten days later, reports emerged that at 3:00 am that morning he had died from a cardiac arrest while still hospitalized, aged 62.

== International goals ==
No.	Date	Venue	Opponent	Score	Result	Competition
1.	12 October 1974	Brussels, Belgium	France	2–1	2–1	UEFA Euro 1976 qualifying
2.	5 September 1976	Reykjavík, Iceland	Iceland	1–0	1–0	1978 FIFA World Cup qualification
3.	12 September 1979	Oslo, Norway	Norway	2–1	2–1	UEFA Euro 1980 qualifying
4.	17 October 1979	Brussels, Belgium	Portugal	2–0	2–0	UEFA Euro 1980 qualifying
5.	21 November 1979	Brussels, Belgium	Scotland	1–0	2–0	UEFA Euro 1980 qualifying
6.	19 December 1979	Glasgow, Scotland	Scotland	2–0	3–1	UEFA Euro 1980 qualifying
7.	19 December 1979	Glasgow, Scotland	Scotland	3–0	3–1	UEFA Euro 1980 qualifying
8.	27 February 1980	Brussels, Belgium	Luxembourg	4–0	5–0	Friendly
9.	27 February 1980	Brussels, Belgium	Luxembourg	5–0	5–0	Friendly
10.	18 March 1980	Brussels, Belgium	Uruguay	2–0	2–0	Friendly
11.	6 June 1980	Brussels, Belgium	Romania	2–1	2–1	Friendly
12.	15 December 1982	Brussels, Belgium	Scotland	2–2	3–2	UEFA Euro 1984 qualifying
13.	15 December 1982	Brussels, Belgium	Scotland	3–2	3–2	UEFA Euro 1984 qualifying
14.	30 March 1983	Leipzig, East Germany	East Germany	1–0	2–1	UEFA Euro 1984 qualifying

== Honours ==
RSC Anderlecht

- Belgian First Division: 1971–72, 1973–74
- Belgian Cup: 1971–72, 1972–73, 1974–75, 1975–76
- Belgian League Cup: 1973, 1974
- European Cup Winners' Cup: 1975–76 (winners), 1976-77 (runners-up), 1977–78 (winners)
- European Super Cup: 1976, 1978
- Amsterdam Tournament: 1976
- Tournoi de Paris: 1977
- Jules Pappaert Cup: 1977
- Belgian Sports Merit Award: 1978

New York Cosmos

- North American Soccer League: 1980

National team

- UEFA European Championship: 1980 (runners-up)
- Belgian Sports Merit Award: 1980

Individual

- Belgian First Division top scorer: 1976-77 (21 goals)
- European Cup Winners Cup Top Scorer: 1977-78 (6 goals)
- Ballon d'Or nomination: 1978
