= Rob Rensenbrink =

Dutch footballer (1947–2020)

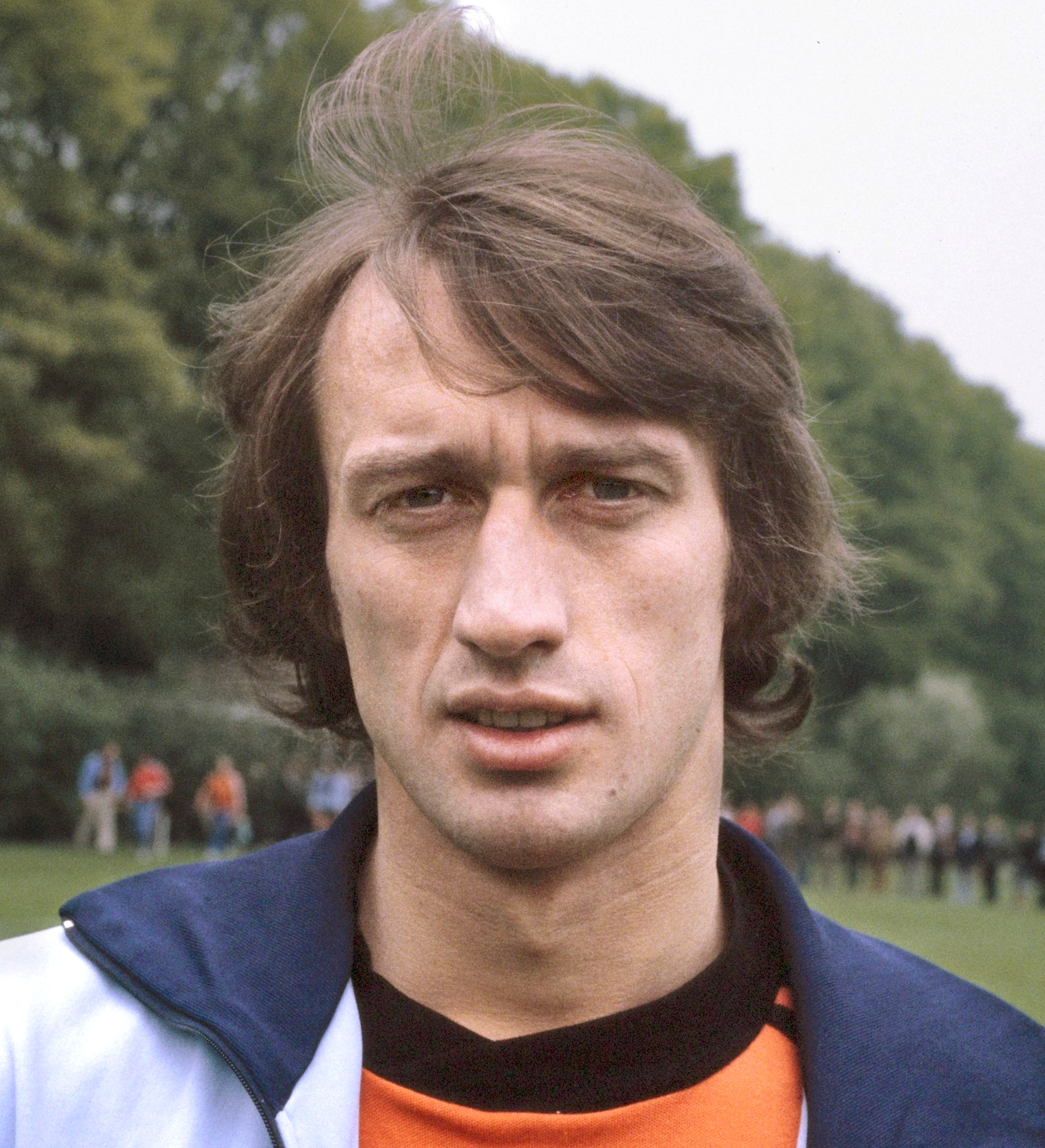
- Rensenbrink in 1978

Personal information
- Full name: Pieter Robert Rensenbrink
- Date of birth: 3 July 1947
- Place of birth: Amsterdam, Netherlands
- Date of death: 24 January 2020 (aged 72)
- Place of death: Oostzaan, Netherlands
- Height: 1.80 m (5 ft 11 in)
- Positions: Left winger; forward

Youth career
- OVVO Amsterdam
- –1965: OSV

Senior career*
Years	Team	Apps	(Gls)
1965–1969	DWS	120	(34)
1969–1971	Club Brugge	55	(24)
1971–1980	Anderlecht	262	(143)
1980	Portland Timbers	18	(6)
1981–1982	Toulouse	12	(1)
Total		467	(208)

International career
1968–1979	Netherlands	46	(14)
Medal record
Men's football
Representing Netherlands
FIFA World Cup
Runner-up	1974 West Germany
Runner-up	1978 Argentina
European Championship
Third place	1976 Yugoslavia
- * Club domestic league appearances and goals

Pieter Robert Rensenbrink (Dutch pronunciation: [ˈrɔp ˈrɛnsə(m)ˌbrɪŋk]; 3 July 1947 – 24 January 2020) was a Dutch footballer and member of the Netherlands national team that reached two FIFA World Cup finals, in 1974 and 1978. A creative and prolific left winger or forward, he became a legend in Belgium while playing in the great Anderlecht side of the 1970s. He is the UEFA Cup Winners' Cup's all-time top scorer, with 25 goals. A talented dribbler as well as a cool finisher and adequate passer, he only ever missed two penalties in his entire career. He was also the first winner of the Onze d'Or in 1976.

== Club career ==
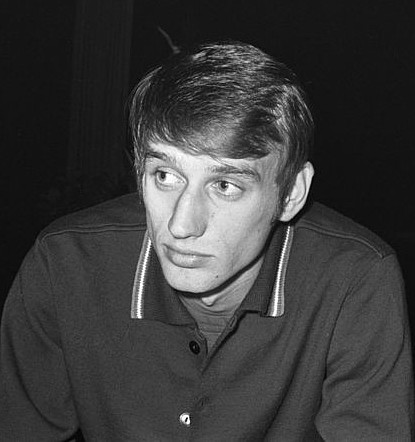
Rob Rensenbrink in 1969

Born 3 July 1947, in Amsterdam, Rensenbrink started his career at DWS, an Amsterdam amateur club, before moving to Belgian side Club Brugge in 1969. Between 1971 and 1980 he played for Anderlecht where he enjoyed his greatest club successes. In total when in Belgium he twice won the Belgian Championships, the Belgian Cup five times and at European club level the European Cup Winners' Cup twice (in 1976 and 1978, as well as being runner-up in 1977). Rensenbrink delivered a notable performance in the 1976 final as Anderlecht ran out 4–2 winners against West Ham United. He scored two goals, one from the penalty spot and set up François Van der Elst for the fourth goal. Among his team mates was Dutch internationalist compatriot, Arie Haan. In 1980, he left Anderlecht and wound down his career with a spell at Portland Timbers in the NASL, followed by a brief stay with Toulouse in France in 1981.

== International career ==
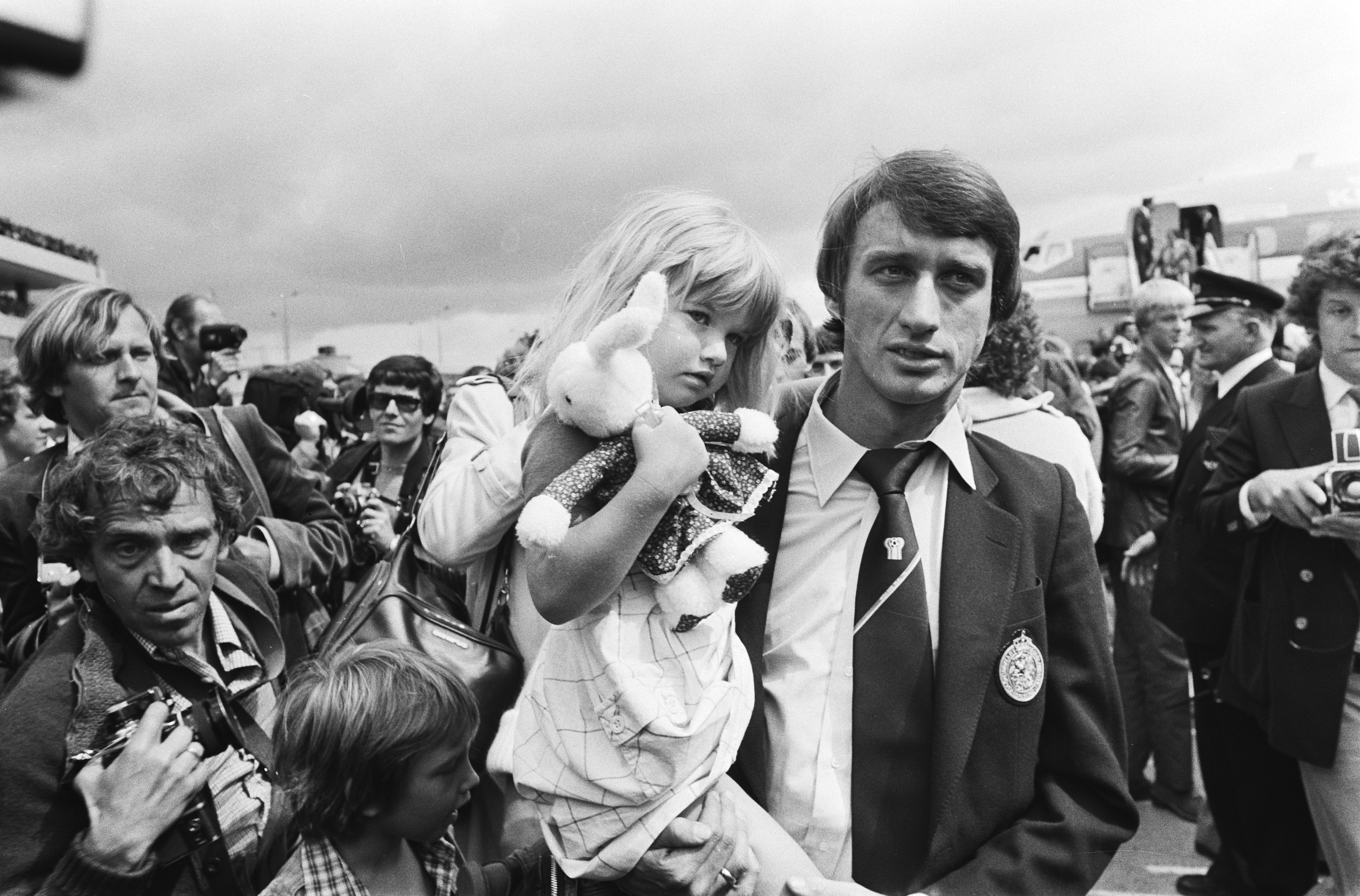
Rob Rensenbrink with his daughter at Schiphol Airport following return from Argentina in 1978

Rensenbrink made his international debut for the Netherlands national football team against Scotland in 1968, but picked up relatively few caps due to competition for the forward positions with Johan Cruijff and Piet Keizer. However, Rinus Michels included him for the 1974 FIFA World Cup squad that made the short trip to West Germany.

The Dutch side that took part in the 1974 FIFA World Cup were the pinnacle of Total Football. Most of the 1974 team were made up of players from AFC Ajax and Feyenoord, so Rensenbrink was an outsider and was unfamiliar with playing the system. His preferred position was up front on the left, but that position was already Johan Cruijff's domain, so he played on the left-wing position in midfield, taking over from Ajax player Piet Keizer. He missed one game in the tournament (when Keizer played instead) and was only half-fit for the final after picking up an injury during the semi-final against Brazil. Rinus Michels gambled on Rensenbrink's fitness and played him from start – however he only lasted until half-time and was replaced by René van de Kerkhof. The Netherlands took an early lead through a Johan Neeskens penalty, but goals from Paul Breitner and Gerd Müller gave West Germany a 2–1 victory. Rensenbrink's performances saw him named to the team of the tournament and he was sought by Ajax as a replacement for Keizer. However, contract negotiations fell through and he remained at Anderlecht.

Rensenbrink stayed in the Netherlands national team during the qualifiers and finals of the 1976 European Football Championship. However, the Netherlands fell at the semi-final stage to Czechoslovakia.

In the 1978 FIFA World Cup tournament in Argentina, the Netherlands again reached the final, but this time without Cruijff (who decided to retire from international football) and under the guidance of Ernst Happel rather than Michels. Out of the shadow of Cruijff, Rensenbrink found more room to showcase his own considerable talent, playing on the left-hand side of a front three alongside Johnny Rep and René van de Kerkhof. He scored a hat-trick in the opening game against Iran, a penalty against Scotland which was goal number 1,000 in FIFA World Cup history and another spot-kick in the 5–1 win over Austria. In the final against Argentina, the Netherlands yet again met the hosts. The Netherlands fell behind to a first-half Mario Kempes strike. After Dick Nanninga's equalizer nine minutes from time, a long pass from the Dutch captain Ruud Krol in the last 30 seconds of normal time gave Rensenbrink a half-chance, but his shot from a very narrow angle hit the post and was cleared by a defender. Had he scored, it is almost certain that the Netherlands would have won the World Cup with Rensenbrink being top goal scorer. Argentina scored twice in extra-time for a 3–1 victory and the Netherlands again had to settle for the runners-up spot.

Rensenbrink played some of the qualifiers for Euro 80, but after earning his 46th cap in 1979 (a 2–0 defeat by Poland in a qualifier for Euro 80), he retired from international football at the age of 32, having scored 14 times for his country. He along with Eusébio are the only players to score the most goals from a penalty spot in a tournament (4 in 1978).

He was named by Pelé as one of the top 125 greatest living footballers in March 2004. He was also named Anderlecht's greatest ever foreign player in 2008.

== Personal life ==
Rensenbrink was married with Corrie van der Ley and they had two children. They lived a "quiet, family life" in the town of Oostzaan in North Holland.

In 2012, Dutch news sources reported that Rensenbrink had been diagnosed with progressive muscular atrophy. In the summer of 2015, he publicly confirmed that he had been diagnosed three years earlier with the neuromuscular disease. He died on 24 January 2020, aged 72.

== Career statistics ==
=== Club ===
Appearances and goals by club, season and competition
Club	Season	League			National cup		League cup		Continental		Other		Total	
Club	Season	Division	Apps	Goals	Apps	Goals	Apps	Goals	Apps	Goals	Apps	Goals	Apps	Goals
DWS	1965–66	Eredivisie	23	5	3	0	–		–		–		26	5
DWS	1966–67	Eredivisie	29	4	2	0	–		2	0	–		33	4
DWS	1967–68	Eredivisie	34	10	3	0	–		2	1	–		39	11
DWS	1968–69	Eredivisie	34	15	4	3	–		5	1	–		43	19
DWS	Total		120	34	12	3	0	0	9	2	0	0	141	39
Club Brugge	1969–70	Belgian First Division	27	10			–		4	3	–		31	13
Club Brugge	1970–71	Belgian First Division	28	14			–		6	2	–		34	16
Club Brugge	Total		55	24			0	0	10	5	0	0	65	29
Anderlecht	1971–72	Belgian First Division	30	16			–		2	0	–		32	16
Anderlecht	1972–73	Belgian First Division	24	16			–		4	4	–		28	20
Anderlecht	1973–74	Belgian First Division	29	20			–		2	3	–		31	23
Anderlecht	1974–75	Belgian First Division	35	19			–		6	3	–		41	22
Anderlecht	1975–76	Belgian First Division	35	23			–		9	8	–		44	31
Anderlecht	1976–77	Belgian First Division	34	16			–		9	7	4 (Note: Appearances in 1976 European Super Cup)	2	43	23
Anderlecht	1977–78	Belgian First Division	24	18			–		7	5	–		31	23
Anderlecht	1978–79	Belgian First Division	31	12			–		2	0	2 (Note: Appearances in 1978 European Super Cup)	1	33	12
Anderlecht	1979–80	Belgian First Division	20	3			–		1	0	–		21	3
Anderlecht	Total		262	143			0	0	42	30	4	3	308	176
Portland Timbers	1980	NASL	18	6	–		–		–		–		18	6
Toulouse	1981–82	Division 2	12	1			–		–		–		12	1
Career total			467	208	12	3	0	0	61	37	4	3	544	251

=== International ===
Appearances and goals by national team and year
National team	Year	Apps	Goals
Netherlands	1968	3	0
Netherlands	1969	4	0
Netherlands	1970	1	0
Netherlands	1973	2	0
Netherlands	1974	12	4
Netherlands	1975	1	0
Netherlands	1976	6	3
Netherlands	1977	3	0
Netherlands	1978	12	7
Netherlands	1979	2	0
Total		46	14

Scores and results list Netherlands' goal tally first, score column indicates score after each Rensenbrink goal.

List of international goals scored by Rob Rensenbrink
No.	Date	Venue	Opponent	Score	Result	Competition	Ref.
1	26 May 1974	Olympic Stadium, Amsterdam, Netherlands	Argentina	2–0	4–1	Friendly	
2	30 June 1974	Parkstadion, Gelsenkirchen, Germany	East Germany	2–0	2–0	1974 FIFA World Cup	
3	4 September 1974	Råsunda Stadium, Stockholm, Sweden	Sweden	5–1	5–1	Friendly	
4	20 November 1974	De Kuip, Rotterdam, Netherlands	Italy	1–1	3–1	UEFA Euro 1976 qualification	
5	25 April 1976	De Kuip, Rotterdam, Netherlands	Belgium	2–0	5–0	UEFA Euro 1976 qualification	
6	25 April 1976	De Kuip, Rotterdam, Netherlands	Belgium	3–0	5–0	UEFA Euro 1976 qualification	
7	25 April 1976	De Kuip, Rotterdam, Netherlands	Belgium	5–0	5–0	UEFA Euro 1976 qualification	
8	22 February 1978	Ramat Gan Stadium, Ramat Gan, Israel	Israel	1–0	2–1	Friendly	
9	3 June 1978	Estadio Malvinas Argentinas, Mendoza Argentina	Iran	1–0	3–0	1978 FIFA World Cup	
10	3 June 1978	Estadio Malvinas Argentinas, Mendoza Argentina	Iran	2–0	3–0	1978 FIFA World Cup	
11	3 June 1978	Estadio Malvinas Argentinas, Mendoza Argentina	Iran	3–0	3–0	1978 FIFA World Cup	
12	11 June 1978	Estadio Malvinas Argentinas, Mendoza Argentina	Scotland	1–0	2–3	1978 FIFA World Cup	
13	14 June 1978	Estadio Córdoba, Córdoba, Argentina	Austria	2–0	5–1	1978 FIFA World Cup	
14	20 September 1978	Goffertstadion, Nijmegen, Netherlands	Iceland	3–0	3–0	UEFA Euro 1980 qualification	

== Honours ==
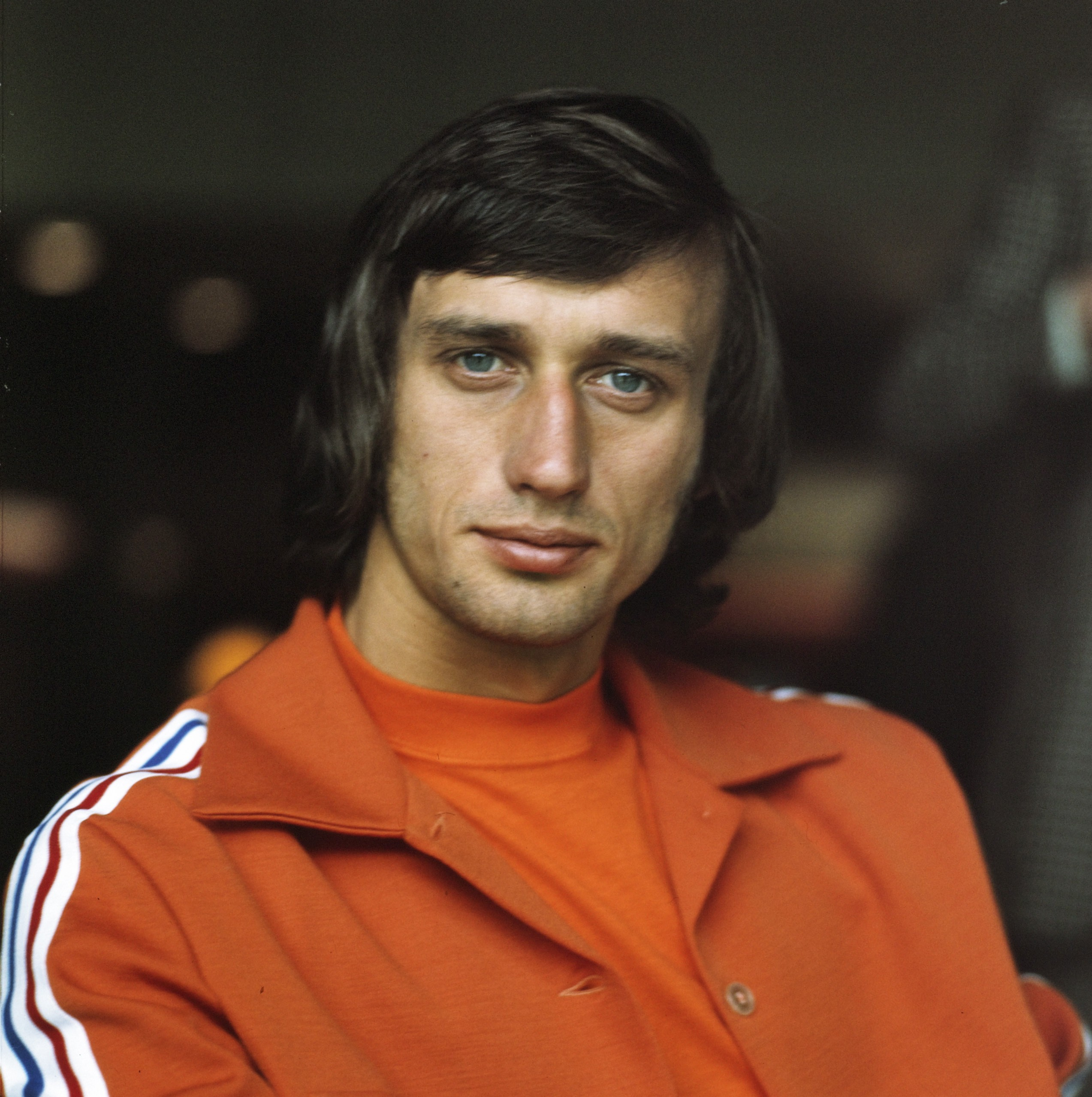
Rob Rensenbrink in 1974

Club Brugge

- Belgian Cup: 1969–70

Anderlecht

- Belgian First Division: 1971–72, 1973–74
- Belgian Cup: 1971–72, 1972–73, 1974–75, 1975–76
- Belgian League Cup: 1973, 1974
- European Cup Winners' Cup: 1975–76, 1977–78; runner-up: 1976–77
- European Super Cup: 1976, 1978
- Amsterdam Tournament: 1976
- Tournoi de Paris: 1977
- Jules Pappaert Cup: 1977
- Belgian Sports Merit Award: 1978

Toulouse

- Division 2: 1981–82

Netherlands

- FIFA World Cup: runner-up 1974, 1978
- UEFA European Football Championship: third place 1976
- Tournoi de Paris: 1978

Individual

- Belgian First Division top scorer: 1972–73
- FIFA World Cup All-Star Team: 1974, 1978
- UEFA Cup Winners' Cup All-time top scorer: (25 goals)
- IOC Footballer of the season: 1975–76
- Belgian Golden Shoe: 1976
- Onze d'Or: 1976
- Ballon d'Or: runner-up 1976, third place 1978
- Onze de Onze: 1976, 1977, 1978, 1979
- Sport Ideal European XI: 1976, 1977, 1978
- FIFA World Cup Bronze Boot: 1978
- FIFA World Cup Most Assists: 1978
- Onze de Bronze: 1978, 1979
- France Football's World Cup Top-100 1930–1990 46th: 1994
- Planète Foot's 50 of the World's Best Players: 1996
- FIFA 100: 2004
- Placar's 100 World Cup Stars 42nd: 2005
- Best Foreign Player in the Belgian First Division of All Time: 2007
- Best RSC Anderlecht Player of All Time: 2008
- The Best Golden Shoe Team: 2011
- Scorer of the 1000th World Cup goal
- DH The Best RSC Anderlecht Team Ever: 2020
- Belgian Pro League Hall of Fame: 2025

== See also ==
- List of FIFA World Cup top goalscorers
