= 1978 Ballon d'Or =

Annual association football award event in France

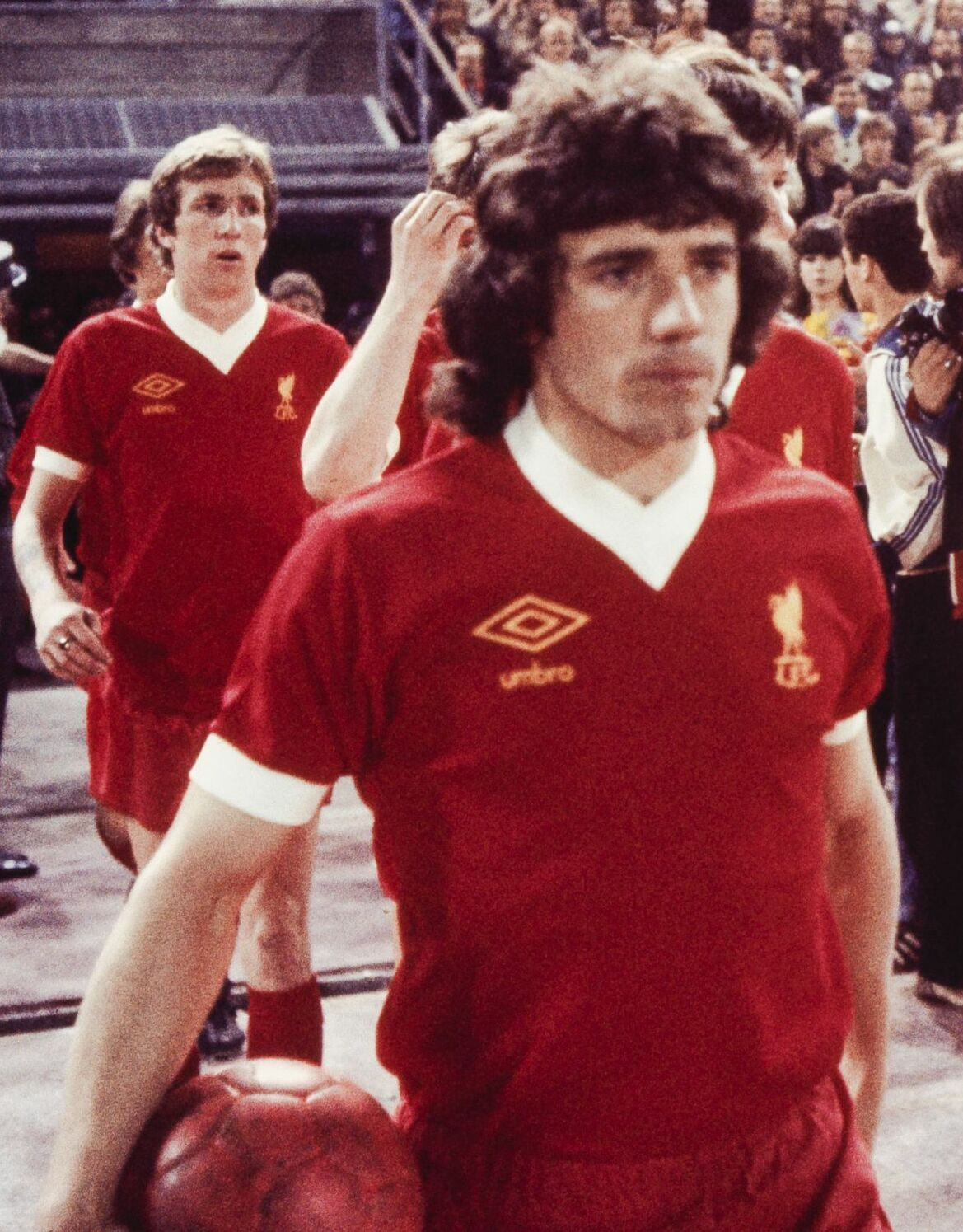
- 1978 Ballon d'Or winner, Kevin Keegan
- Date: 27 December 1978
- Presented by: France Football

Highlights
- Won by: (England) Kevin Keegan (1st award)
- Website: ballondor.com

The 1978 Ballon d'Or, given to the best football player in Europe as judged by a panel of sports journalists from UEFA member countries, was awarded to the English forward Kevin Keegan on 27 December 1978. There were 26 voters, from Austria, Belgium, Bulgaria, Czechoslovakia, Denmark, East Germany, England, Finland, France, Greece, Hungary, Italy, Luxembourg, the Netherlands, Poland, Portugal, Republic of Ireland, Romania, Scotland, Soviet Union, Spain, Sweden, Switzerland, Turkey, West Germany and Yugoslavia.

== Rankings ==
Rank	Name	Club(s)	Nationality	Points
1	Kevin Keegan	(West Germany) Hamburger SV	England	87
2	Hans Krankl	(Spain) Barcelona	Austria	81
3	Rob Rensenbrink	(Belgium) Anderlecht	Netherlands	50
4	Roberto Bettega	(Italy) Juventus	Italy	28
5	Paolo Rossi	(Italy) L.R. Vicenza	Italy	23
6	Ronnie Hellström	(West Germany) Kaiserslautern	Sweden	20
6	Ruud Krol	(Netherlands) Ajax	Netherlands	20
8	Kenny Dalglish	(England) Liverpool	Scotland	10
8	Allan Simonsen	(West Germany) Borussia Mönchengladbach	Denmark	10
10	Peter Shilton	(England) Nottingham Forest	England	9
11	Arie Haan	(Belgium) Anderlecht	Netherlands	7
12	René van de Kerkhof	(Netherlands) PSV Eindhoven	Netherlands	6
13	Antonio Cabrini	(Italy) Juventus	Italy	5
13	Willy van de Kerkhof	(Netherlands) PSV Eindhoven	Netherlands	5
15	Johan Cruyff	(Spain) Barcelona	Netherlands	4
15	Graeme Souness	(England) Liverpool	Scotland	4
15	Zdeněk Nehoda	(Czechoslovakia) Dukla Prague	Czechoslovakia	4
18	Marián Masný	(Czechoslovakia) Slovan Bratislava	Czechoslovakia	3
19	Archie Gemmill	(England) Nottingham Forest	Scotland	2
19	Marius Trésor	(France) Marseille	France	2
21	João Alves	(Portugal) Benfica	Portugal	1
21	Rainer Bonhof	(Spain) Valencia	West Germany	1
21	Zbigniew Boniek	(Poland) Widzew Łódź	Poland	1
21	Franco Causio	(Italy) Juventus	Italy	1
21	Hansi Müller	(West Germany) VfB Stuttgart	West Germany	1
21	Johan Neeskens	(Spain) Barcelona	Netherlands	1
21	Michel Platini	(France) Nancy	France	1
21	Karl-Heinz Rummenigge	(West Germany) Bayern Munich	West Germany	1
21	Didier Six	(France) Marseille	France	1
21	François Van der Elst	(Belgium) Anderlecht	Belgium	1
