= Nico de Bree =

Dutch footballer (1944–2016)

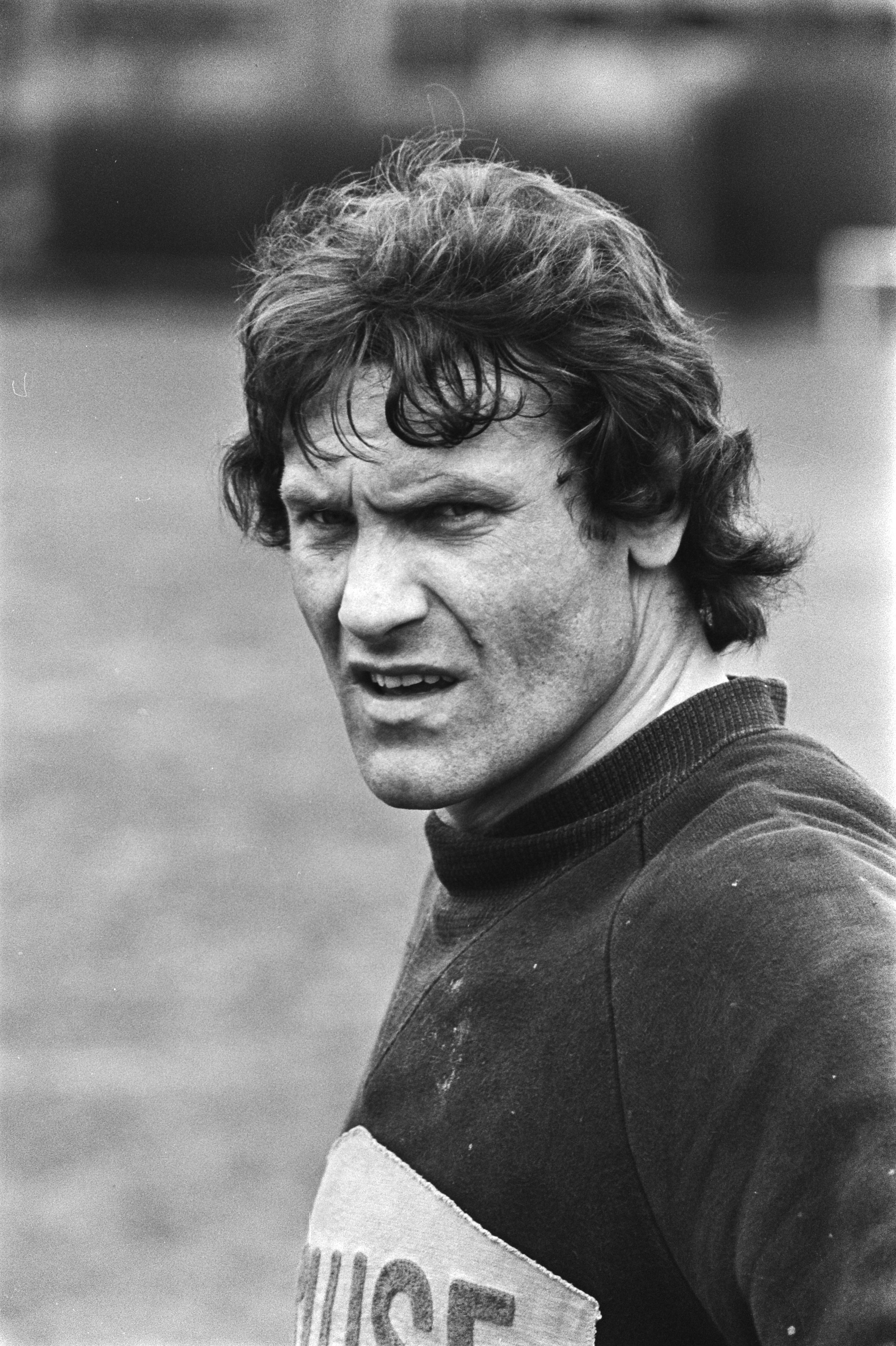
- De Bree in 1977

Personal information
- Full name: Nicolaas Alphonsus Petrus de Bree
- Date of birth: 16 September 1944
- Place of birth: Zuilen, Netherlands
- Date of death: 6 May 2016 (aged 71)
- Place of death: Vienna, Austria
- Position: Goalkeeper

Youth career
- HMS

Senior career*
Years	Team	Apps	(Gls)
1963–1966	Elinkwijk	89	(0)
1966–1972	N.E.C.	204	(0)
1972–1973	Racing White Daring		
1973–1977	RWDM		
1977–1980	Anderlecht		
1980–1981	Winterslag		
1981–1983	Beerschot		
1983–1984	DS'79	3	(0)
- * Club domestic league appearances and goals

Nicolaas Alphonsus Petrus "Nico" de Bree (16 September 1944 – 6 May 2016) was a Dutch footballer who played as a goalkeeper.

== Club career ==
De Bree started his professional career at local club Elinkwijk and moved to N.E.C. in 1966. After playing 204 matches for the Nijmegen club, he moved abroad to play in Belgium and won the 1975 league title with RWDM and the 1978 UEFA Cup Winners' Cup with Anderlecht. He also played for Winterslag and Beerschot.

He finished his career with DS'79 in 1984.

== Personal life ==
After retiring as a player, De Bree owned two nightclubs in Belgium and was a goalkeeper coach. He was the goalkeeper coach of China national team in 2004.

=== Death ===
He died of cancer in Vienna.

== Honours ==
=== Player ===
==== RWD Molenbeek ====
- Belgian First Division: 1974–75
- Jules Pappaert Cup: 1975
- Amsterdam Tournament: 1975

RSC Anderlecht

- European Cup Winners' Cup: 1977–78 (winners)
- European Super Cup: 1978
- Tournoi de Paris: 1977
- Jules Pappaert Cup: 1977
- Belgian Sports Merit Award: 1978
