= Ronny Martens =

Belgian footballer

Personal information
- Date of birth: 22 December 1958 (age 67)
- Place of birth: Belgium
- Position: Forward

Senior career*
Years	Team	Apps	(Gls)
1977–1981	Anderlecht		
1981–1984	Beveren		
1984–1985	Gent		
1985–1987	K.V. Mechelen		
1987–1988	Gent		
1988–1989	R.W.D. Molenbeek		
1989–1990	Boom		
- * Club domestic league appearances and goals

Ronny Martens (born 22 December 1958) is a Belgian former professional footballer who played as a forward for Anderlecht, Beveren, Gent, K.V. Mechelen, and R.W.D. Molenbeek. He participated in UEFA Euro 1980, but did not earn any senior international caps in his career.

== Honours ==
Anderlecht

- European Cup Winners' Cup: 1977–78
- European Super Cup: 1978
- Belgian First Division: 1980–81
- Jules Pappaert Cup: 1977
- Belgian Sports Merit Award: 1978

Beveren Source:

- Belgian First Division: 1983–84
- Belgian Cup: 1982–83

KV Mechelen

- Belgian Cup: 1986–87

Belgium

- UEFA European Championship runner-up: 1980
- Belgian Sports Merit Award: 1980
