= Pierrot Langers =

Luxembourgish footballer

Personal information
- Date of birth: 15 June 1949 (age 77)
- Position: Forward

Senior career*
Years	Team	Apps	(Gls)
1970–1971	Red Black Pfaffenthal		
1971–1977	Aris Bonnevoie		
- Avenir Beggen

International career
1971–1976	Luxembourg	11	(1)
- * Club domestic league appearances and goals

Pierrot Langers (born 15 June 1949) is a Luxembourgish former footballer who played as a forward.
