= Matty van Toorn =

Dutch footballer (1950–2007)

Matthijs 'Matty' van Toorn (29 December 1950 – 21 November 2007) was a Dutch football player, manager and player's agent.

A defender, Van Toorn began his playing career with Feyenoord. He played for Excelsior Rotterdam in the 1970–71 Eredivisie season. He moved to Belgium where he would spend six seasons with Sporting Charleroi before joining Anderlecht in 1978. He would later play for RFC Liège and K. Sint-Niklase S.K.E.

Following his playing career, Van Toorn managed Tongeren, Union Royale Namur, Olympic and R.F.C. de Liège and later became a player's agent, discovering Taye Taiwo.
