= Humbeek =

- Coat of arms

- Location in Belgium
- Coordinates: 50°58′N 04°22′E
- Country: Belgium
- Region: Flemish Region
- Community: Flemish Community
- Province: Flemish Brabant
- Arrondissement: Halle-Vilvoorde
- Municipality: Grimbergen

Area
  - Total: 7.87 km^{2} (3.04 sq mi)

Population
  - Total: 4,574
  - Density: 581/km^{2} (1,510/sq mi)
- Postal codes: 1851
- Area codes: 02
- Website: www.grimbergen.be

Humbeek is a small town in Belgium with approximately 4,574 inhabitants. It is located in the municipality of Grimbergen, in the province of Flemish Brabant. Humbeek has an area of 7.87 km^{2} and a population density of 506 inhabitants per km^{2}. Humbeek is located along the Brussels–Scheldt Maritime Canal, which divides the village in two.

== History ==
Humbeek was an independent municipality with its own mayor until 1976. On January 1, 1977, it became a submunicipality of Grimbergen.
