= 1984–85 Belgian First Division =

82nd season of top-tier football in Belgium

Belgian First Division
- Season: 1984–85

Statistics of Belgian League in season 1984–85.

== Overview ==
Location of teams in Belgian First Division 1984–85

It was performed by 18 teams, and R.S.C. Anderlecht won the championship, while K. Sint-Niklase S.K.E. and Racing Jet de Bruxelles were relegated.

== League standings ==
Pos	Team	Pld	W	D	L	GF	GA	GD	Pts	Qualification or relegation
1	R.S.C. Anderlecht	34	26	7	1	100	25	+75	59	Qualified for 1985–86 European Cup
2	Club Brugge K.V.	34	19	10	5	80	46	+34	48	Qualified for 1985–86 UEFA Cup
3	R.F.C. de Liège	34	17	12	5	64	36	+28	46	Qualified for 1985–86 UEFA Cup
4	K.S.V. Waregem	34	19	7	8	64	39	+25	45	Qualified for 1985–86 UEFA Cup
5	K.S.K. Beveren	34	17	7	10	67	32	+35	41	
6	K.A.A. Gent	34	14	12	8	62	36	+26	40	
7	Royal Antwerp FC	34	13	13	8	44	46	−2	39	
8	Standard Liège	34	10	13	11	42	43	−1	33	
9	K. Waterschei S.V. Thor Genk	34	9	14	11	29	37	−8	32	
10	K.S.C. Lokeren Oost-Vlaanderen	34	10	10	14	55	59	−4	30	
11	Cercle Brugge K.S.V.	34	10	9	15	33	51	−18	29	Qualified for 1985–86 UEFA Cup Winners' Cup
12	KV Mechelen	34	9	10	15	37	54	−17	28	
13	K.V. Kortrijk	34	8	11	15	41	64	−23	27	
14	RFC Sérésien	34	9	8	17	42	64	−22	26	
15	Lierse S.K.	34	7	11	16	26	58	−32	25	
16	K. Beerschot V.A.C.	32	7	10	15	38	60	−22	24	
17	K. Sint-Niklase S.K.E.	34	6	9	19	42	78	−36	21	Relegated to Division II
18	Racing Jet de Bruxelles	34	5	9	20	38	76	−38	19	Relegated to Division II

== Results ==
Home \ Away	AND	ANT	BEE	BEV	CER	CLU	RJB	GNT	KOR	FCL	LIE	LOK	MEC	SER	SNK	STA	WAR	WTG
Anderlecht		3–0	2–0	2–1	2–1	1–1	4–0	5–1	1–0	3–0	4–0	7–1	5–0	6–0	5–1	1–0	8–2	1–0
Antwerp	1–1		3–1	0–0	1–0	2–1	0–1	1–3	1–1	2–1	1–1	2–1	2–1	3–1	2–2	2–1	2–4	3–1
Beerschot	0–2	2–0		1–1	2–2	6–2	1–0	1–1	1–4	3–1	0–1	1–0	0–2	2–1	0–0	1–0	1–3	0–0
Beveren	0–2	4–0	3–1		1–2	0–0	5–0	3–1	5–0	0–2	3–0	2–0	1–1	2–2	4–0	0–0	3–1	3–0
Cercle Brugge	0–0	0–2	0–0	1–3		0–2	2–0	0–1	0–1	0–0	0–0	3–1	1–0	2–0	1–0	2–1	0–1	0–0
Club Brugge	0–0	0–0	3–1	5–4	6–1		3–0	0–0	4–1	0–0	7–0	5–1	1–0	2–2	9–4	1–0	1–2	2–1
RJ Bruxelles	2–9	2–2	2–2	1–0	1–4	3–4		1–1	4–0	1–2	2–1	1–2	3–0	0–2	1–1	1–2	1–2	0–0
Gent	0–1	1–1	3–1	2–1	6–0	4–1	4–1		4–0	1–2	2–0	2–3	6–0	2–0	2–0	1–1	1–0	4–0
Kortrijk	3–1	2–2	4–1	1–6	1–2	1–2	3–1	1–1		2–2	1–1	3–0	2–1	3–0	1–4	0–0	0–2	0–0
Liège	0–3	4–0	2–1	2–0	4–1	1–1	4–2	1–1	2–2		3–1	2–0	7–0	1–0	5–2	3–0	1–0	2–2
Lierse	1–1	1–1	3–0	1–0	0–2	0–2	1–1	1–0	2–1	1–1		0–4	0–5	3–0	0–0	1–1	0–1	0–1
Lokeren	3–4	0–3	3–3	0–1	3–1	2–3	3–0	0–0	4–0	1–1	1–1		1–1	1–1	6–1	2–1	1–1	3–0
Mechelen	1–2	0–0	4–4	0–0	2–2	1–2	1–0	0–0	1–1	2–2	3–0	1–3		1–2	3–1	1–1	1–0	1–0
Seraing	2–4	0–0	4–0	0–2	3–0	2–2	2–2	3–3	3–0	0–2	3–1	2–1	1–2		1–0	0–3	1–0	0–3
Sint-Niklase	0–4	1–3	1–0	1–2	2–1	1–2	2–1	0–0	3–0	1–3	3–4	0–0	0–1	5–2		2–2	1–2	0–2
Standard Liège	2–2	1–1	1–0	2–4	3–0	0–4	3–3	2–0	1–0	2–0	0–0	3–3	1–0	1–0	2–2		3–2	0–1
Waregem	1–1	4–0	1–0	0–3	1–1	1–1	4–0	2–1	2–2	0–0	2–0	3–1	1–0	4–1	7–1	2–2		5–0
Waterschei Thor	1–3	0–1	1–1	1–0	1–1	4–1	0–0	3–3	0–0	1–1	2–0	0–0	2–0	1–1	0–0	1–0	0–1	

Legend: Blue = home team win; Yellow = draw; Red = away team win.

== Topscorers ==
Scorer	Goals	Team
(Belgium) Ronny Martens	23	Gent
(Belgium) Alexandre Czerniatynski	22	Anderlecht
(Belgium) Marc Degryse	21	Club Brugge
(Belgium) Erwin Vandenbergh	20	Anderlecht
(Zaire) Eugène Kabongo	19	Seraing
(Belgium) Jan Ceulemans	17	Club Brugge
(Netherlands) Angelo Nijskens	15	Lokeren
(Belgium) Guido Swinnen	15	Beerschot
(Belgium) Karel Cornelissen	15	Sint-Niklase
(Socialist Federal Republic of Yugoslavia) Duško Lukić	14	KVK
(Belgium) Franky Vercauteren	14	Anderlecht
(Belgium) Enzo Scifo	14	Anderlecht
(West Germany) Erwin Albert	14	Beveren
(Belgium) Willy Geurts	14	Liège

== Attendances ==
#	Club	Average
1	Anderlecht	19,176
2	Club Brugge	13,118
3	Liège	10,353
4	Standard	10,000
5	Gent	8,853
6	Waregem	8,088
7	Beveren	7,665
8	Waterschei	6,929
9	Mechelen	6,256
10	Lokeren	6,147
11	Kortrijk	5,412
12	Antwerp	5,282
13	Sérésien	4,841
14	Lierse	4,806
15	Cercle	4,765
16	Beerschot	4,559
17	Sint-Niklase	4,418
18	Racing Jet	3,003
