= 1986–87 Belgian First Division =

84th season of top-tier football in Belgium

Belgian First Division
- Season: 1986–87
- Champions: RSC Anderlecht
- Relegated: RFC Seraing; K. Berchem Sport

The 1986–87 edition of the Belgian League was the 84th since its establishment: it was competed by 18 teams, and R.S.C. Anderlecht won the championship, while RFC Seraing and K. Berchem Sport were relegated.

Location of teams in Belgian First Division 1986–87

== League standings ==
Pos	Team	Pld	W	D	L	GF	GA	GD	Pts	Qualification or relegation
1	R.S.C. Anderlecht	34	25	7	2	82	25	+57	57	Qualified for 1987–88 European Cup
2	KV Mechelen	34	24	7	3	57	18	+39	55	Qualified for 1987–88 European Cup Winners' Cup
3	Club Brugge K.V.	34	19	7	8	70	34	+36	45	Qualified for 1987–88 UEFA Cup
4	K.S.K. Beveren	34	15	14	5	44	24	+20	44	Qualified for 1987–88 UEFA Cup
5	K.S.C. Lokeren Oost-Vlaanderen	34	18	8	8	59	41	+18	44	Qualified for 1987–88 UEFA Cup
6	R.F.C. de Liège	34	14	10	10	44	38	+6	38	
7	R. Charleroi S.C.	34	13	9	12	49	52	−3	35	
8	K.S.V. Waregem	34	13	8	13	45	43	+2	34	
9	K. Beerschot V.A.C.	34	11	11	12	35	39	−4	33	
10	Standard Liège	34	10	11	13	40	38	+2	31	
11	Cercle Brugge K.S.V.	34	9	12	13	37	40	−3	30	
12	Racing Jet de Bruxelles	34	9	12	13	34	47	−13	30	
13	R.W.D. Molenbeek	34	8	12	14	37	53	−16	28	
14	Royal Antwerp FC	34	8	10	16	43	49	−6	26	
15	K.V. Kortrijk	34	8	8	18	37	52	−15	24	
16	K.A.A. Gent	34	7	9	18	25	50	−25	23	
17	RFC Seraing	34	5	10	19	30	63	−33	20	Relegated to Division II
18	K. Berchem Sport	34	4	7	23	20	82	−62	15	Relegated to Division II

== Results ==
Home \ Away	AND	ANT	BEE	BRC	BEV	CER	CLU	RJB	CHA	GNT	KOR	FCL	LOK	MEC	MOL	SER	STA	WAR
Anderlecht		2–0	5–0	7–0	1–1	2–0	1–0	3–0	5–0	1–0	0–0	3–1	4–3	1–1	1–1	5–3	4–0	1–0
Antwerp	1–4		1–1	1–2	1–1	0–0	1–1	0–0	4–1	0–1	4–2	0–2	0–1	1–2	3–2	3–1	2–3	0–1
Beerschot	4–0	0–0		0–0	1–1	1–0	3–0	2–1	1–1	2–1	3–1	1–0	0–3	1–1	1–1	3–0	1–2	0–0
Berchem	0–5	0–5	0–1		0–0	1–1	1–4	0–0	0–0	0–2	4–1	3–4	0–1	0–2	0–2	1–1	1–0	0–4
Beveren	0–1	2–1	1–0	5–0		2–0	2–2	1–2	1–1	0–0	2–1	1–0	1–1	0–0	3–1	2–0	2–0	2–0
Cercle Brugge	2–2	4–0	0–0	2–0	1–1		1–2	2–0	1–1	3–0	2–1	0–0	0–2	1–1	4–0	0–0	1–1	0–5
Club Brugge	2–1	1–1	5–2	5–0	2–0	1–0		2–2	5–0	1–0	1–1	3–1	1–4	3–1	5–1	3–1	1–0	8–0
RJ Bruxelles	1–3	3–0	1–0	2–0	1–1	2–1	0–4		1–2	1–0	3–0	0–2	2–2	0–3	1–2	1–1	1–1	1–1
Charleroi	0–2	1–1	2–1	4–1	0–4	2–0	1–0	1–1		2–2	1–0	3–0	3–1	0–2	4–1	5–0	1–1	2–4
Gent	0–3	1–1	2–0	3–1	0–1	0–1	0–0	0–1	0–0		2–1	1–1	2–1	0–2	1–1	2–2	0–1	2–1
Kortrijk	1–1	0–3	2–0	7–0	0–0	3–2	0–0	0–2	3–0	3–0		1–1	1–3	0–1	2–1	1–0	1–1	0–0
Liège	0–1	4–3	1–1	3–0	2–1	1–0	0–1	3–0	2–1	1–0	3–0		1–1	0–3	1–0	0–0	1–1	4–1
Lokeren	1–4	1–0	1–0	4–1	2–0	1–2	2–3	1–1	2–1	2–1	3–1	1–1		1–1	1–2	2–1	1–0	1–1
Mechelen	0–1	1–0	1–0	3–0	0–0	3–1	1–0	2–0	4–2	4–1	3–0	2–0	0–0		2–0	2–1	0–1	3–1
Molenbeek	0–2	3–3	1–1	0–0	2–2	1–0	1–0	1–1	0–2	4–0	0–2	1–1	1–2	1–2		1–1	2–1	1–1
Seraing	1–3	0–2	3–0	0–4	0–1	1–1	3–2	1–0	0–3	2–0	2–1	0–1	1–4	1–2	1–0		1–3	0–0
Standard Liège	1–1	0–1	1–2	2–0	1–2	2–2	1–0	1–1	0–2	5–0	3–0	1–1	1–2	0–1	3–0	1–1		1–1
Waregem	1–2	1–0	0–2	1–0	0–1	1–2	1–2	4–1	2–0	1–1	1–0	3–1	3–1	0–1	0–2	4–1	1–0	

Legend: Blue = home team win; Yellow = draw; Red = away team win.

== Topscorers ==
Scorer	Goals	Team
(Iceland) Arnór Guðjohnsen	19	R.S.C. Anderlecht
(Belgium) Dimitri Mbuyu	17	K.S.C. Lokeren Oost-Vlaanderen
(Belgium) Guy François	17	R.F.C. de Liège
(Belgium) Marc Degryse	16	Club Brugge K.V.
(Australia) Eddie Krnčević	16	R.S.C. Anderlecht
(Belgium) Ronny Martens	15	KV Mechelen
(Netherlands) Piet den Boer	15	KV Mechelen
(Austria) Richard Niederbacher	14	K.S.V. Waregem
(Belgium) Lambic Wawa	13	R.W.D. Molenbeek
(Belgium) Jan Goyvaerts	13	Racing Jet de Bruxelles

== Attendances ==
No.	Club	Average
1	Anderlecht	17,041
2	Club Brugge	13,471
3	Charleroi	12,882
4	Standard	8,941
5	Liège	8,000
6	Mechelen	7,565
7	Lokeren	7,059
8	Gent	6,835
9	Beerschot	6,353
10	Waregem	6,318
11	RWDM	6,294
12	Beveren	6,159
13	Antwerp	5,388
14	Kortrijk	4,882
15	Cercle	4,118
16	Berchem	3,994
17	Sérésien	3,618
18	Racing Jet	2,894
