= 1976–77 European Cup Winners' Cup =

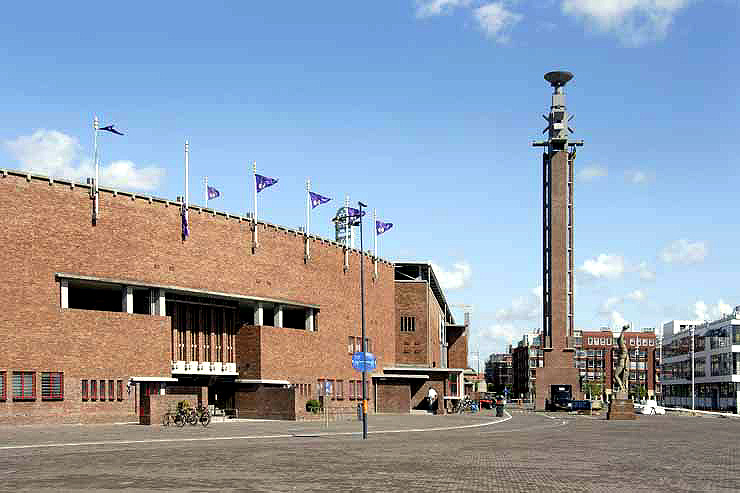

Final positions
- Champions: (West Germany) Hamburg (1st title)
- Runners-up: (Belgium) Anderlecht

Tournament statistics
- Top scorer(s): Kiril Milanov (Levski Spartak); 13 goals

The 1976–77 season of the European Cup Winners' Cup was won by Hamburger SV in the final against defending champions Anderlecht.

== Preliminary round ==
Team 1	Agg.	Team 2	1st leg	2nd leg
Cardiff City (Wales)	2–2 (a)	(Switzerland) Servette	1–0	1–2

== First round ==
Team 1	Agg.	Team 2	1st leg	2nd leg
CSU Galați (Romania)	2–5	(Portugal) Boavista	2–3	0–2
Levski Spartak (Bulgaria)	19–3	(Finland) Reipas Lahti	12–2	7–1
Rapid Wien (Austria)	2–3	(Spain) Atlético Madrid	1–2	1–1
Lierse (Belgium)	1–3	(Socialist Federal Republic of Yugoslavia) Hajduk Split	1–0	0–3
Cardiff City (Wales)	1–3	(Soviet Union) Dinamo Tbilisi	1–0	0–3
MTK/VM Budapest (Hungary)	4–2	(Czechoslovakia) Sparta Prague	3–1	1–1
Hamburger SV (West Germany)	4–1	(Iceland) Keflavík	3–0	1–1
1. FC Lokomotive Leipzig (East Germany)	3–5	(Scotland) Heart of Midlothian	2–0	1–5
Floriana (Malta)	1–6	(Poland) Śląsk Wrocław	1–4	0–2
Bohemians (Republic of Ireland)	3–1	(Denmark) Esbjerg	2–1	1–0
Iraklis (Greece)	0–2	(Cyprus) APOEL	0–0	0–2
Bodø/Glimt (Norway)	0–3	(Italy) Napoli	0–2	0–1
Anderlecht (Belgium)	5–3	(Netherlands) Roda JC	2–1	3–2
AIK (Sweden)	2–3	(Turkey) Galatasaray	1–2	1–1
Carrick Rangers (Northern Ireland)	4–3	(Luxembourg) Aris Bonnevoie	3–1	1–2
Southampton (England)	5–2	(France) Marseille	4–0	1–2

=== First leg ===
15 September 1976

CSU Galați (Romania)	2–3	(Portugal) Boavista
Marinescu 48'; Kramer 53'	Report	Olteanu 17' (o.g.); Pereira 35'; Ribeiro 67'

Stadionul Dunărea, Galați
Attendance: 12,000
Referee: Kostas Xanthoulis (Cyprus)

15 September 1976

Iraklis (Greece)	0–0	(Cyprus) APOEL

Kaftanzoglio Stadium, Thessaloniki
Attendance: 10,000
Referee: Otto Anderco (Romania)

15 September 1976

Bodø/Glimt (Norway)	0–2	(Italy) Napoli
		Speggiorin 25', 65'

Bodø

15 September 1976

Southampton (England)	4–0	(France) Marseille
Waldron 31'; Channon 34', 69' (pen.); Osgood 35'

The Dell, Southampton

15 September 1976

Carrick Rangers (Northern Ireland)	3–1	(Luxembourg) Aris Bonnevoie
Prenter 56', 85'; Connor 89'	Report	Pissinger 76'

Seaview, Belfast
Attendance: 3,000
Referee: Erik Fredriksson (Sweden)

=== Second leg ===
29 September 1976

Boavista (Portugal)	2–0	(Romania) CSU Galați
Ribeiro 7', 42'	Report

Estádio do Bessa, Porto
Attendance: 8,000
Referee: John Hunting (England)

Boavista won 5–2 on aggregate.

29 September 1976

APOEL (Cyprus)	2–0	(Greece) Iraklis
Markou 17', 40'

Makario Stadium, Nicosia
Attendance: 3,000
Referee: Velibor Ljujić (Yugoslavia)

APOEL won 2-0 on aggregate.

29 September 1976

Napoli (Italy)	1–0	(Norway) Bodø/Glimt
Massa 35'

Naples

Napoli won 3–0 on aggregate.

29 September 1976

Marseille (France)	2–1	(England) Southampton
Nogués 26'; Emon 80'		Peach 70'

Stade Vélodrome, Marseille

Southampton won 5–2 on aggregate.

6 October 1976

Aris Bonnevoie (Luxembourg)	2–1	(Northern Ireland) Carrick Rangers
Weber 8'; Langers 48'	Report	Erwin 54'

Stade Josy Barthel, Luxembourg City
Attendance: 1,500
Referee: Michel Vautrot (France)

Carrick Rangers won 4–3 on aggregate.

== Second round ==
Team 1	Agg.	Team 2	1st leg	2nd leg
Boavista (Portugal)	3–3 (a)	(Bulgaria) Levski Spartak	3–1	0–2
Atlético Madrid (Spain)	3–1	(Socialist Federal Republic of Yugoslavia) Hajduk Split	1–0	2–1
Dinamo Tbilisi (Soviet Union)	1–5	(Hungary) MTK/VM Budapest	1–4	0–1
Hamburger SV (West Germany)	8–3	(Scotland) Heart of Midlothian	4–2	4–1
Śląsk Wrocław (Poland)	4–0	(Republic of Ireland) Bohemian	3–0	1–0
APOEL (Cyprus)	1–3	(Italy) Napoli	1–1	0–2
Anderlecht (Belgium)	10–2	(Turkey) Galatasaray SK	5–1	5–1
Carrick Rangers (Northern Ireland)	3–9	(England) Southampton	2–5	1–4

=== First leg ===
20 October 1976

Boavista (Portugal)	3–1	(Bulgaria) Levski Spartak
Celso Pita 16', 83'; Mané 43'		Milanov 28'

Estádio do Bessa, Porto
Attendance: 10,000
Referee: Clive Thomas (Wales)

20 October 1976

Atlético Madrid (Spain)	1-0	(Socialist Federal Republic of Yugoslavia) Hajduk Split
Cano 49'	Report

Vicente Calderón Stadium, Madrid
Attendance: 20,000
Referee: Rudolf Frickel (West Germany)

20 October 1976

Dinamo Tbilisi (Soviet Union)	1-4	(Hungary) MTK/VM Budapest
Machaidze 89'	Report	Siklósi 31'; Takács 51', 76'; Kiss 87'

Vladimir Ilyich Lenin Dinamo Stadium, Tbilisi
Attendance: 80,000
Referee: Constantin Ghiță (Romania)

20 October 1976

APOEL (Cyprus)	1–1	(Italy) Napoli
Leonidou 37' (pen.)		Savoldi 87' (pen.)

Makario Stadium, Nicosia
Attendance: 12,000
Referee: Dimitar Parmakov (Bulgaria)

=== Second leg ===
3 November 1975

Levski Spartak (Bulgaria)	2–0	(Portugal) Boavista
Panov 13'; Milanov 30'

Stadion Levski, Sofia
Attendance: 40,000
Referee: Orhan Cebe (Turkey)

3–3 on aggregate. Levski Spartak won on away goals.

4 November 1976

Hajduk Split (Socialist Federal Republic of Yugoslavia)	1-2	(Spain) Atlético Madrid
Žungul 26'	Report	Ayala 53'; Leal 59'

Plinara Stadion, Split
Attendance: 25,000
Referee: John Paterson (Scotland)

Atlético Madrid won 3–1 on aggregate.

3 November 1976

MTK/VM Budapest (Hungary)	1-0	(Soviet Union) Dinamo Tbilisi
Koritár 89'	Report

Népstadion, Budapest
Attendance: 10,000
Referee: Nikolaos Zlatanos (Greece)

MTK/VM Budapest won 5–1 on aggregate.

4 November 1976

Napoli (Italy)	2–0	(Cyprus) APOEL
Speggiorin 9'; Massa 25'

Stadio San Paolo, Naples
Attendance: 15,000
Referee: António Porém Luís (Portugal)

Napoli won 3–1 on aggregate.

== Quarter-finals ==
Team 1	Agg.	Team 2	1st leg	2nd leg
Levski Spartak (Bulgaria)	2–3	(Spain) Atlético Madrid	2–1	0–2
MTK/VM Budapest (Hungary)	2–5	(West Germany) Hamburger SV	1–1	1–4
Śląsk Wrocław (Poland)	0–2	(Italy) Napoli	0–0	0–2
Anderlecht (Belgium)	3–2	(England) Southampton	2–0	1–2

=== First leg ===
2 March 1977

Śląsk Wrocław (Poland)	0–0	(Italy) Napoli

Wrocław

=== Second leg ===
16 March 1977

Napoli (Italy)	2–0	(Poland) Śląsk Wrocław
Massa 9'; Chiarugi 50'

Naples

Napoli won 2–0 on aggregate.

== Semi-finals ==
Team 1	Agg.	Team 2	1st leg	2nd leg
Atlético Madrid (Spain)	3–4	(West Germany) Hamburger SV	3–1	0–3
Napoli (Italy)	1–2	(Belgium) Anderlecht	1–0	0–2

=== First leg ===
6 April 1977

Napoli (Italy)	1–0	(Belgium) Anderlecht
Bruscolotti 81'

Naples

=== Second leg ===
20 April 1977

Anderlecht (Belgium)	2–0	(Italy) Napoli
Thissen 30'; Van der Elst 58'

Brussels

Anderlecht won 2–1 on aggregate.

== Final ==
11 May 1977

Anderlecht (Belgium)	0–2	(West Germany) Hamburger SV
	Report Report 2	Volkert 78' (pen.); Magath 88'

Olympisch Stadion, Amsterdam
Attendance: 66,000
Referee: Pat Partridge (England)

== See also ==
- 1976–77 European Cup
- 1976–77 UEFA Cup
