= Belgian National Sports Merit Award =

Annual sports award

The Belgian National Sports Merit Award is an annual award handed out to a Belgian sportsperson or -team for exceptional merit. Players can only win the award once during their career, making this trophy one of the most prestigious in Belgian sports. The trophy is awarded by a jury consisting of (former) sports champions (e.g. Paul Van Himst and Ingrid Berghmans), influential sports people and sports journalists and is led by the mayor of Brussels.

The trophy was established in 1928 by Alban Collignon, as a tribute to the founder of the Royal Belgian Aero-club, Fernand Jacobs. Therefore the trophy was in the first four years known as the Fernand Jacobs Award.

== Winners ==
Year	Winner	Sport
2026	Sarah Chaâri	Taekwondo
2025	Emma Meesseman	Basketball
2024	Lotte Kopecky	Cycling
2023	Bart Swings	Speed Skating & Roller Skating
2022	Remco Evenepoel	Cycling
2021	Bashir Abdi	Athletics
2020	Wout van Aert	Cycling & Cyclo-cross
2019	Belgium men's national field hockey team	Field Hockey
2018	Nina Derwael	Gymnastics
2017	David Goffin	Tennis
2016	Nafissatou Thiam	Athletics
2015	Belgian men's 4 × 400 metres relay team	Athletics
2014	Daniel Van Buyten	Football
2013	Frederik Van Lierde	Triathlon
2012	Evi Van Acker	Sailing
2011	Kevin Borlée	Athletics
2010	Philippe Le Jeune	Equestrianism
2009	Philippe Gilbert	Cycling
2008	not awarded	
2007	Belgian women's 4 × 100 metres relay team	Athletics
2006	Kim Gevaert and Tia Hellebaut	Athletics
2005	Tom Boonen	Cycling
2004	Axel Merckx	Cycling
2003	Stefan Everts	Motocross
2002	Marc Wilmots	Football
2001	Kim Clijsters and Justine Henin	Tennis
2000	Joël Smets	Motocross
1999	Gella Vandecaveye	Judo
1998	Ulla Werbrouck	Judo
1997	Luc Van Lierde	Triathlon
1996	Johan Museeuw	Cycling
1995	Frédérik Deburghgraeve	Swimming
1994	Brigitte Becue	Swimming
1993	Vincent Rousseau	Athletics
1992	Annelies Bredael	Rowing
1991	Jean-Michel Saive	Table Tennis
1990	Jan Ceulemans	Football
1989	Michel Preud'homme	Football
1988	Eric Geboers	Motocross
1987	Ingrid Lempereur	Swimming
1986	William Van Dijck	Athletics
1985	not awarded	
1984	André Malherbe	Motocross
1983	Eddy Annys	Athletics
1982	Ingrid Berghmans	Judo
1981	Annie Lambrechts	Roller Skating
1980	Belgium national football team	Football
1979	Robert Van de Walle	Judo
1978	Anderlecht	Football
1977	Gaston Rahier	Motocross
1976	Ivo Van Damme	Athletics
1975	Jean-Pierre Burny	Canoe-Kayak
1974	Paul Van Himst	Football
1973	Roger De Coster	Motocross
1972	Karel Lismont	Athletics
1971	Miel Puttemans	Athletics
1970	Freddy Herbrand	Athletics
1969	Serge Reding	Weightlifting
1968	Jacky Ickx	Motorsports
1967	Ferdinand Bracke and Eddy Merckx	Cycling
1966	Raymond Ceulemans	Cue sports
1965	First jachtwing of the Belgian Air Component	Air sports
1964	Joël Robert	Motocross
1963	Aureel Vandendriessche	Athletics
1962	Gaston Roelants	Athletics
1961	Rik Van Looy	Cycling
1960	Flory Van Donck	Golf
1959	Belgium men's national field hockey team	Field Hockey
1958	René Baeten	Motocross
1957	Jacky Brichant and Philippe Washer	Tennis
1956	Gilberte Thirion	Motorsports
1955	Roger Moens	Athletics
1954	Adolf Verschueren	Cycling
1953	Crew of the Yacht Omoo (Mr. and Mrs. Van de Wielle and Fred Debels)	Yachting
1952	André Noyelle	Cycling
1951	Johny Claes and Jacques Ickx	Motorsports
1950	Briek Schotte	Cycling
1949	Feru Moulin	Swimming
1948	Etienne Gailly	Athletics
1947	Micheline Lannoy and Pierre Baugniet	Figure Skating
1946	Gaston Reiff	Athletics
1945	Flying personnel of the Belgian Royal Air Force-section	Air sports
1944	not awarded	
1943	Prince Albert de Ligne	General
1942	Pol Braekman	Athletics
1941	Jan Guilini	Swimming
1940	Fernande Caroen	Swimming
1939	Commandant Henry de Menten de Horne	Equestrianism
1938	Hubert Carton de Wiart	Motorsports
1937	Joseph Mostert	Athletics
1936	Ernest Demuyter	Hot air ballooning
1935	Count Arnold de Looz-Corswarem	Air sports
1934	Union Saint-Gilloise	Football
1933	Jef Scherens	Cycling
1932	not awarded	
1931	René Milhoux and Jules Tacheny	Motorsports
1930	Hyacinte Roosen	Wrestling
1929	Georges Ronsse	Cycling
1928	Louis Crooy and Victor Groenen	Air sports

== See also ==
- Belgian Sportsman of the year
- Belgian Sports Personality of the Year
