= Jules Pappaert Cup =

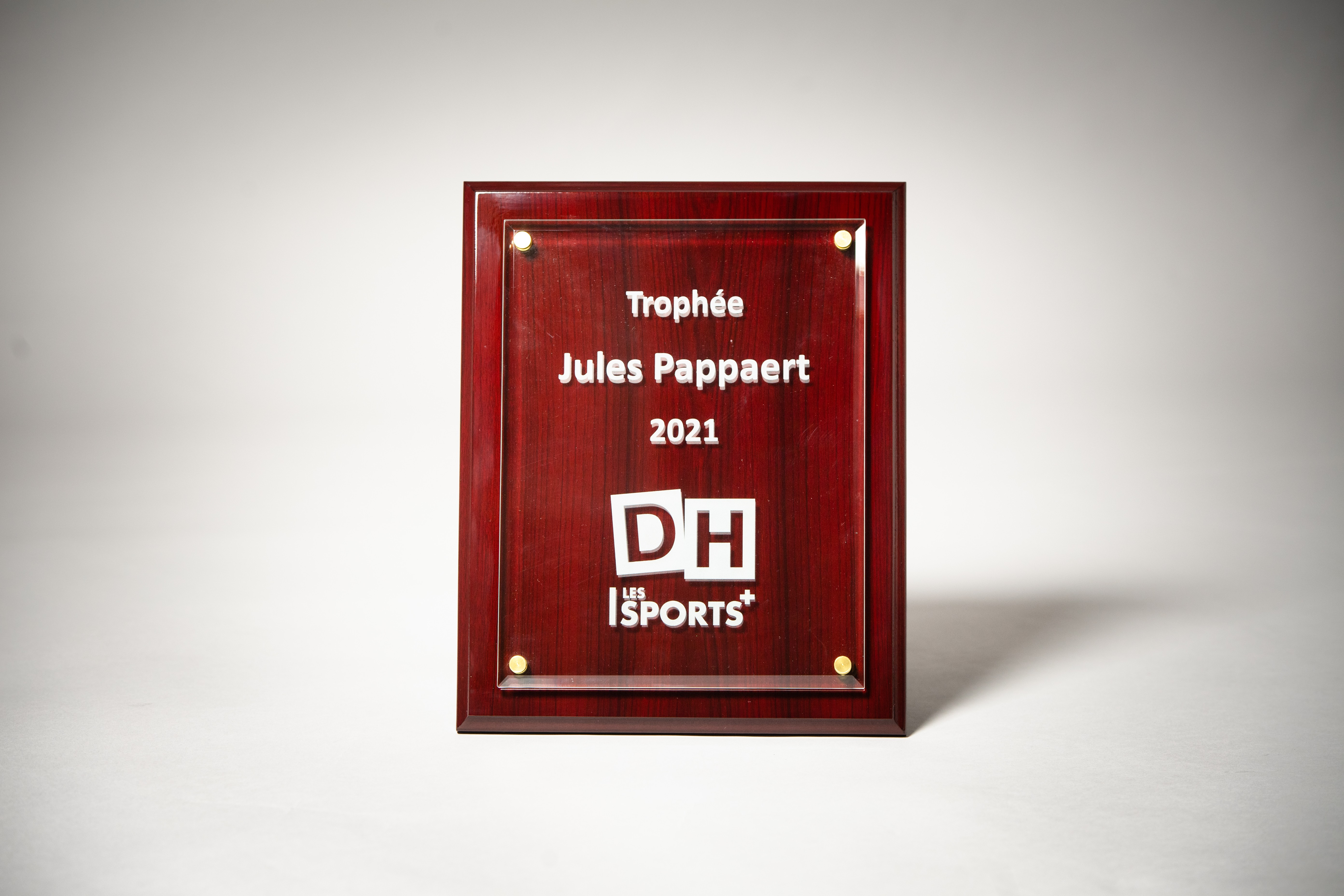
Trophée Pappaert 2021

Trophy Jules Pappaert or Pappaert cup is a Belgian football trophy since 1953 and is awarded annually to a club in the first, second or third division of the Belgian Pro League with the longest uninterrupted series of unbeaten games.

The award is given by La Dernière Heure / Les Sports and is named after the former footballer Jules Pappaert. During the 1930s, he was Royale Union Saint-Gilloise's captain. In that period, Union was able to achieve a series of 60 unbeaten games, a record that still stands as of 2022.

== Honors ==
Year	Club	# Unbeaten games
1953	Standard Liège	15
1954	AA Gent	25
1955	KFC Herentals	14
1956	Royale Union Saint-Gilloise	17
1957	KSV Waregem	17
1958	RFC Tournai	15
1959	Daring CB	19
1960	Standard Liège	16
1961	KFC Turnhout	19
1962	Standard Liège	19
1963	Royal Antwerp F.C.	20
1964	Waterschei SV Thor	20
1965	VV Overpelt	21
1966	KSV Waregem	26
1967	RFC Tournai	20
1968	Boom FC	18
1969	WS Lauwe	14
1970	AS Eupen	19
1971	Standard Liège	18
1972	Club Brugge	21
1973	Waterschei SV Thor	18
1974	Waterschei SV Thor	25
1975	R.W.D.M.	30
1976	Royale Union Saint-Gilloise	23
1977	RSC Anderlecht	18
1978	Club Brugge	18
1979	Racing Jet de Bruxelles	25
1980	RFC Seraing	25
1981	Stade Leuven	20
1982	Sint-Niklase SK	20
1983	RSC Anderlecht	18
1984	Racing Jet de Bruxelles	17
1985	RSC Anderlecht	33
1986	KV Oostende	16

Year	Club	# Unbeaten games
1987	SK Beveren	25
1988	Sint-Truiden VV	26
1989	FC Zwarte Leeuw	27
1990	KV Mechelen	24
1991	Club Brugge	32
1992	Standard Liège	22
1993	RFC Seraing	33
1994	Patro Eisden	25
1995	Club Brugge	25
1996	KRC Genk	23
1997	Dessel Sport	27
1998	KV Kortrijk	31
1999	RAEC Mons	29
2000	RSC Anderlecht	26
2001	RSC Anderlecht	28
2002	KRC Genk	26
2003	Excelsior Virton	18
2004	RS Waasland	21
2005	Club Brugge	31
2006	KVSK United	42
2007	Standaard Wetteren	24
2008	Standard Liège	31
2009	Lierse SK	19
2010	RCS Visé	30
2011	RSC Anderlecht	24
2012	Moeskroen-Péruwelz	31
2013	Hoogstraten VV	18
2014	Standard de Liège	16
2015	Sint-Truiden	20
2019	K.V. Mechelen	20
2020	Not awarded	
2021	Royale Union Saint-Gilloise	16
2022	Royale Union Saint-Gilloise	17
