= 1983–84 UEFA Cup =

13th season of Europe's secondary club football tournament organised by UEFA

Tournament details
- Dates: 11 September 1983 – 23 May 1984
- Teams: 64 (from 31 associations)

Final positions
- Champions: (England) Tottenham Hotspur (2nd title)
- Runners-up: (Belgium) Anderlecht

Tournament statistics
- Matches played: 126
- Goals scored: 371 (2.94 per match)
- Top scorer(s): Tibor Nyilasi (Austria Wien); 8 goals

The 1983–84 UEFA Cup was the 13th season of the UEFA Cup, the third-tier club football competition organised by the Union of European Football Associations (UEFA). The final was played over two legs at the Constant Vanden Stock Stadium, Brussels, Belgium, and at White Hart Lane, London, England. Tottenham Hotspur of England defeated title holders Anderlecht of Belgium, on penalties, after the final finished 2–2 on aggregate, to win the competition for the second time.

== Association team allocation ==
A total of 64 teams from 31 UEFA member associations participated in the 1982–83 UEFA Cup, all entering from the first round over six knock-out rounds. The association ranking based on the UEFA country coefficients is used to determine the number of participating teams for each association:

- Associations 1–3 each have four teams qualify.
- Associations 4–8 each have three teams qualify.
- Associations 9–21 each have two teams qualify.
- Associations 22–32 each have one team qualify.

=== Association ranking ===
For the 1983–84 UEFA Cup, the associations are allocated places according to their 1982 UEFA country coefficients, which takes into account their performance in European competitions from 1977–78 to 1981–82.

Association ranking for 1983-84 UEFA Cup

Rank	Association	Coeff.	Teams	Notes
1	West Germany	51.999	4	
2	England	37.902	4	
3	Netherlands	35.466	4	
4	Spain	34.599	3	
5	Belgium	31.066	3	
6	France	29.550	3	
7	East Germany	29.450	3	
8	(Socialist Federal Republic of Yugoslavia) Yugoslavia	28.800	3	
9	Soviet Union	25.966	2	
10	Czechoslovakia	24.050	3	
11	Switzerland	22.150	2	
12	Italy	22.082	2	
13	Portugal	21.750	2	
14	Scotland	21.750	2	
15	Sweden	19.500	2	
16	Romania	16.750	2	
17	Bulgaria	16.700	2	

Rank	Association	Coeff.	Teams	Notes
18	Hungary	15.570	2	
19	Denmark	15.166	2	
20	Austria	13.750	2	
-	Wales	13.000	0	
21	Greece	12.500	2	
22	Poland	11.850	1	
23	(Republic of Ireland) Republic of Ireland	8.999	1	
24	Norway	7.583	1	
25	Albania	5.500	0	
26	(Northern Ireland) Northern Ireland	4.999	1	
27	Turkey	4.833	1	
28	Cyprus	4.332	1	
29	Luxembourg	3.666	1	
30	Iceland	3.664	1	
31	Malta	3.331	1	
32	Finland	2.499	1	

Wales: There was no national league in Wales before 1992 and the only competition organised by the Football Association of Wales was the Welsh Cup so Wales had just a single participant in European competitions, the winner (or best placed Welsh team as several English teams also competed) of the Welsh Cup which competed in the UEFA Cup Winners' Cup. Its virtual ranking is only an original research, because the UEFA country ranking was only used to allocate the UEFA Cup spots at time, so Wales was not included.
Albania: Until 1985, Albania frequently withdrew their allocated place in the UEFA Cup due to political reasons. Partizani would have qualified by league position. This additional place went to the 10th placed association, Czechoslovakia, instead of the 9th placed association, the Soviet Union.

=== Teams ===
The labels in parentheses show how each team qualified for competition:

- TH: Title holders
- CW: Cup winners
- CR: Cup runners-up
- LC: League Cup winners
- 2nd, 3rd, 4th, 5th, 6th, etc.: League position
- P-W: End-of-season European competition play-offs winners

Qualified teams for 1983–84 UEFA Cup
(West Germany) Werder Bremen (2nd)	(West Germany) Stuttgart (3rd)	(West Germany) Bayern Munich (4th)	(West Germany) Kaiserslautern (6th)
(England) Watford (2nd)	(England) Tottenham Hotspur (4th)	(England) Nottingham Forest (5th)	(England) Aston Villa (6th)
(Netherlands) Feyenoord (2nd)	(Netherlands) PSV Eindhoven (3rd)	(Netherlands) Sparta Rotterdam (4th)	(Netherlands) Groningen (5th)
(Spain) Real Madrid (2nd)	(Spain) Atlético Madrid (3rd)	(Spain) Sevilla (5th)	(Belgium) Anderlecht (2nd)^{TH}
(Belgium) Royal Antwerp (3rd)	(Belgium) Gent (4th)	(France) Bordeaux (2nd)	(France) Lens (4th)
(France) Laval (5th)	(East Germany) Vorwärts Frankfurt (2nd)	(East Germany) Carl Zeiss Jena (3rd)	(East Germany) Lokomotive Leipzig (4th)
(Socialist Federal Republic of Yugoslavia) Hajduk Split (2nd)	(Socialist Federal Republic of Yugoslavia) Radnički Niš (4th)	(Socialist Federal Republic of Yugoslavia) Red Star Belgrade (5th)	(Soviet Union) Dynamo Kyiv (2nd)
(Soviet Union) Spartak Moscow (3rd)	(Czechoslovakia) Baník Ostrava (2nd)	(Czechoslovakia) Sparta Prague (3rd)	(Czechoslovakia) Inter Bratislava (4th)
(Switzerland) St. Gallen (3rd)	(Switzerland) FC Zürich (4th)	(Italy) Internazionale (3rd)	(Italy) Verona (4th)
(Portugal) Sporting CP (3rd)	(Portugal) Vitória S.C. (4th)	(Scotland) Celtic (2nd)	(Scotland) St Mirren (5th)
(Sweden) Elfsborg (3rd)	(Sweden) Malmö (4th)	(Romania) Universitatea Craiova (2nd)	(Romania) Sportul Studențesc (3rd)
(Bulgaria) Levski Sofia (2nd)	(Bulgaria) Lokomotiv Plovdiv (LC)	(Hungary) Ferencváros (2nd)	(Hungary) Budapest Honvéd (3rd)
(Denmark) AGF (2nd)	(Denmark) B 1903 (3rd)	Austria Memphis (2nd)	(Austria) Sturm Graz (4th)
(Greece) AEL (2nd)	(Greece) PAOK (4th)	(Poland) Widzew Łódź (2nd)	(Republic of Ireland) Drogheda United (2nd)
(Norway) Bryne (2nd)	(Northern Ireland) Coleraine (3rd)	(Turkey) Trabzonspor (2nd)	(Cyprus) Anorthosis (2nd)
(Luxembourg) Aris Bonnevoie (3rd)	(Iceland) ÍBV (2nd)	(Malta) Rabat Ajax (3rd)	(Finland) HJK (2nd)

== Schedule ==
The schedule of the competition was as follows. Matches were scheduled for Wednesdays, though some matches exceptionally took place on Tuesdays or Sundays.

Schedule for 1983–84 UEFA Cup
Round	First leg	Second leg
First round	11–14 September 1983	27–28 September 1983
Second round	19 October 1983	2 November 1983
Third round	23 November 1983	7 December 1983
Quarter-finals	7 March 1984	21 March 1984
Semi-finals	11 April 1984	25 April 1984
Final	9 May 1984	23 May 1984

== First round ==
Team 1	Agg.	Team 2	1st leg	2nd leg
Kaiserslautern (West Germany)	3–4	(England) Watford	3–1	0–3
Sparta Prague (Czechoslovakia)	4–3	(Spain) Real Madrid	3–2	1–1
AEL (Greece)	2–3	(Hungary) Budapest Honvéd	2–0	0–3 (a.e.t.)
Anorthosis (Cyprus)	0–11	(West Germany) Bayern Munich	0–1	0–10
Atlético Madrid (Spain)	2–4	(Netherlands) Groningen	2–1	0–3
Bryne (Norway)	1–4	(Belgium) Anderlecht	0–3	1–1
Celtic (Scotland)	5–1	(Denmark) AGF	1–0	4–1
Drogheda United (Republic of Ireland)	0–14	(England) Tottenham Hotspur	0–6	0–8
Aris Bonnevoie (Luxembourg)	0–15	Austria Memphis	0–5	0–10
Baník Ostrava (Czechoslovakia)	6–1	(Denmark) B 1903	5–0	1–1
Dynamo Kyiv (Soviet Union)	0–1	(France) Laval	0–0	0–1
Bordeaux (France)	2–7	(East Germany) Lokomotive Leipzig	2–3	0–4
Spartak Moscow (Soviet Union)	7–0	(Finland) HJK	2–0	5–0
Universitatea Craiova (Romania)	1–1 (1–3 p)	(Socialist Federal Republic of Yugoslavia) Hajduk Split	1–0	0–1 (a.e.t.)
FC Zürich (Switzerland)	3–8	(Belgium) Royal Antwerp	1–4	2–4
Verona (Italy)	4–2	(Socialist Federal Republic of Yugoslavia) Red Star Belgrade	1–0	3–2
ÍBV (Iceland)	0–3	(East Germany) Carl Zeiss Jena	0–0	0–3
Gent (Belgium)	2–3	(France) Lens	1–1	1–2 (a.e.t.)
Nottingham Forest (England)	3–0	(East Germany) Vorwärts Frankfurt	2–0	1–0
Lokomotiv Plovdiv (Bulgaria)	2–5	(Greece) PAOK	1–2	1–3
PSV Eindhoven (Netherlands)	6–2	(Hungary) Ferencváros	4–2	2–0
Rabat Ajax (Malta)	0–16	(Czechoslovakia) Inter Bratislava	0–10	0–6
Radnički Niš (Socialist Federal Republic of Yugoslavia)	5–1	(Switzerland) St. Gallen	3–0	2–1
Sevilla (Spain)	3–4	(Portugal) Sporting CP	1–1	2–3
Sparta Rotterdam (Netherlands)	5–1	(Northern Ireland) Coleraine	4–0	1–1
Sportul Studențesc (Romania)	1–2	(Austria) Sturm Graz	1–2	0–0
St Mirren (Scotland)	0–3	(Netherlands) Feyenoord	0–1	0–2
Trabzonspor (Turkey)	1–2	(Italy) Internazionale	1–0	0–2
Stuttgart (West Germany)	1–2	(Bulgaria) Levski Sofia	1–1	0–1
Vitória S.C. (Portugal)	1–5	(England) Aston Villa	1–0	0–5
Werder Bremen (West Germany)	3–2	(Sweden) Malmö	1–1	2–1
Widzew Łódź (Poland)	2–2 (a)	(Sweden) Elfsborg	0–0	2–2

=== First leg ===
11 September 1983
17:00

Rabat Ajax (Malta)	0–10	(Czechoslovakia) Inter Bratislava
	Report	Brezík 15', 24', 35', 88'; Koník 26', 28'; Hudec 51'; Reznák 62', 75'; Tomčák 82'

Rabat Ajax Football Ground, Mtarfa
Attendance: 4,220
Referee: Rosario Lo Bello (Italy)

14 September 1983
15:15

Baník Ostrava (Czechoslovakia)	5–0	(Denmark) B 1903
Válek 6', 20'; Šreiner 43', 47'; Zajaroš 86'	Report

Bazaly, Ostrava
Attendance: 5,500
Referee: Renzo Peduzzi (Switzerland)

13 September 1983
16:00

ÍBV (Iceland)	0–0	(East Germany) Carl Zeiss Jena
	Report

Kópavogsvöllur, Kópavogur
Attendance: 550
Referee: John Kinsella (Republic of Ireland)

14 September 1983
16:00

Sportul Studențesc (Romania)	1–2	(Austria) Sturm Graz
Munteanu 31'	Report	Szokolai 74'; Jurtin 85'

Stadionul Steaua, Bucharest
Attendance: 7,000
Referee: Sadik Deda (Turkey)

14 September 1983
16:00

Widzew Łódź (Poland)	0–0	(Sweden) Elfsborg
	Report

Hetman Stadium, Białystok
Attendance: 32,000
Referee: Jakob Baumann (Switzerland)

14 September 1983
16:30

AEL (Greece)	2–0	(Hungary) Budapest Honvéd
Maloumidis 15' (pen.); Kmiecik 76'	Report

Alcazar Stadium, Larissa
Attendance: 10,448
Referee: Yordan Zhezhov (Bulgaria)

14 September 1983
16:30

Drogheda United (Republic of Ireland)	0–6	(England) Tottenham Hotspur
	Report	Falco 5', 74'; Crooks 33'; Galvin 44'; Mabbutt 51', 81'

United Park, Drogheda
Attendance: 7,000
Referee: Ole Amundsen (Denmark)

14 September 1983
17:00

Sparta Prague (Czechoslovakia)	3–2	(Spain) Real Madrid
Chovanec 27'; Procházka 53'; Griga 78'	Report	Santillana 40'; Juanito 60'

Stadion Letná, Prague
Attendance: 40,000
Referee: Alain Delmer (France)

14 September 1983
17:00

Spartak Moscow (Soviet Union)	2–0	(Finland) HJK
Argudyayev 13'; Gladilin 88'	Report

Central Lenin Stadium, Moscow
Attendance: 25,700
Referee: Evangelos Giannakoudakis (Greece)

14 September 1983
17:00

Trabzonspor (Turkey)	1–0	(Italy) Internazionale
Tuncay 88'	Report

Hüseyin Avni Aker Stadyumu, Trabzon
Attendance: 32,500
Referee: Jan Keizer (Netherlands)

14 September 1983
18:00

Dynamo Kyiv (Soviet Union)	0–0	(France) Laval
	Report

Respublykanskyi Stadion, Kiev
Attendance: 49,800
Referee: Erkan Göksel (Turkey)

14 September 1983
18:00

Universitatea Craiova (Romania)	1–0	(Socialist Federal Republic of Yugoslavia) Hajduk Split
Geolgău 86'	Report

Stadionul Central, Craiova
Attendance: 40,000
Referee: Michel Vautrot (France)

14 September 1983
18:00

Vitória S.C. (Portugal)	1–0	(England) Aston Villa
Gregório Freixo 82' (pen.)	Report

Estádio D. Afonso Henriques, Guimarães
Attendance: 28,750
Referee: Joël Quiniou (France)

14 September 1983
18:15

Bryne (Norway)	0–3	(Belgium) Anderlecht
	Report	Vandereycken 33'; Guðjohnsen 53'; Vandenbergh 75'

Bryne Stadion, Bryne
Attendance: 2,417
Referee: Arto Ravander (Finland)

14 September 1983
19:00

Lokomotiv Plovdiv (Bulgaria)	1–2	(Greece) PAOK
Sadakov 72' (pen.)	Report	Dimopoulos 42'; Georgopoulos 48'

Stadion Lokomotiv, Plovdiv
Attendance: 12,000
Referee: Karl-Heinz Tritschler (West Germany)

14 September 1983
19:30

Anorthosis (Cyprus)	0–1	(West Germany) Bayern Munich
	Report	Mathy 32'

Tsirion Stadium, Limassol
Attendance: 18,000
Referee: Béla Divinyi (Hungary)

14 September 1983
19:30

PSV Eindhoven (Netherlands)	4–2	(Hungary) Ferencváros
Koolhof 19', 80'; Thoresen 20', 40'	Report	Ebedli 37'; Kvaszta 68'

Philips Sportpark, Eindhoven
Attendance: 9,250
Referee: George Courtney (England)

14 September 1983
20:00

Kaiserslautern (West Germany)	3–1	(England) Watford
Allofs 9'; Nilsson 55', 85'	Report	Gilligan 16'

Betzenbergstadion, Kaiserslautern
Attendance: 19,960
Referee: Erik Fredriksson (Sweden)

14 September 1983
20:00

Aris Bonnevoie (Luxembourg)	0–5	Austria Memphis
	Report	Drabits 38'; Nyilasi 41'; Prohaska 58', 79', 82' (pen.)

Stade Camille Polfer, Luxembourg City
Attendance: 1,125
Referee: Ignace van Swieten (Netherlands)

14 September 1983
20:00

FC Zürich (Switzerland)	1–4	(Belgium) Royal Antwerp
Baur 28'	Report	Pétursson 13', 17', 67'; Cnops 89'

Letzigrund, Zürich
Attendance: 6,350
Referee: Miklós Nagy (Hungary)

14 September 1983
20:00

Gent (Belgium)	1–1	(France) Lens
Busk 37'	Report	Ogaza 55'

Jules Ottenstadion, Ghent
Attendance: 13,000
Referee: Victoriano Sánchez Arminio (Spain)

14 September 1983
20:00

Radnički Niš (Socialist Federal Republic of Yugoslavia)	3–0	(Switzerland) St. Gallen
Beganović 4' (pen.); Stojković 37'; Rinčić 65'	Report

Stadion Čair, Niš
Attendance: 21,000
Referee: Ioan Igna (Romania)

14 September 1983
20:00

Sparta Rotterdam (Netherlands)	4–0	(Northern Ireland) Coleraine
Olde Riekerink 14' (pen.), 21'; Lengkeek 64', 67'	Report

Sparta Stadion, Rotterdam
Attendance: 5,500
Referee: Kazimierz Mikołajewski (Poland)

14 September 1983
20:00

Stuttgart (West Germany)	1–1	(Bulgaria) Levski Sofia
Kelsch 76'	Report	Valchev 78'

Neckarstadion, Stuttgart
Attendance: 17,500
Referee: Ron Bridges (Wales)

14 September 1983
20:00

Werder Bremen (West Germany)	1–1	(Sweden) Malmö
Reinders 66' (pen.)	Report	Sunesson 76'

Weserstadion, Bremen
Attendance: 19,750
Referee: Kenny Hope (Scotland)

14 September 1983
20:30

Celtic (Scotland)	1–0	(Denmark) AGF
Aitken 63'	Report

Celtic Park, Glasgow
Attendance: 23,569
Referee: Augusto Lamo Castillo (Spain)

14 September 1983
20:30

Bordeaux (France)	2–3	(East Germany) Lokomotive Leipzig
Girard 63'; Giresse 72'	Report	Zötzsche 15' (pen.); Richter 51', 86'

Stade du Parc Lescure, Bordeaux
Attendance: 8,000
Referee: John Carpenter (Republic of Ireland)

14 September 1983
20:30

Verona (Italy)	1–0	(Socialist Federal Republic of Yugoslavia) Red Star Belgrade
Fanna 19' (pen.)	Report

Stadio Marcantonio Bentegodi, Verona
Attendance: 26,623
Referee: Alek Jarguz (Poland)

14 September 1983
20:30

Nottingham Forest (England)	2–0	(East Germany) Vorwärts Frankfurt
Wallace 16'; Hodge 61'	Report

City Ground, Nottingham
Attendance: 14,994
Referee: Alder dos Santos (Portugal)

14 September 1983
20:30

St Mirren (Scotland)	0–1	(Netherlands) Feyenoord
	Report	Gullit 29'

Love Street, Paisley
Attendance: 10,301
Referee: Svein-Inge Thime (Norway)

14 September 1983
21:00

Atlético Madrid (Spain)	2–1	(Netherlands) Groningen
Marina 85'; Waalderbos 89' (o.g.)	Report	McDonald 56'

Estadio Vicente Calderón, Madrid
Attendance: 40,000
Referee: Gino Menicucci (Italy)

14 September 1983
21:00

Sevilla (Spain)	1–1	(Portugal) Sporting CP
Magdaleno 18'	Report	Manuel Fernandes 72'

Estadio Ramón Sánchez Pizjuán, Seville
Attendance: 45,000
Referee: Zoran Petrović (Yugoslavia)

=== Second leg ===
27 September 1983
16:30

Inter Bratislava (Czechoslovakia)	6–0	(Malta) Rabat Ajax
Mráz 11'; Tomčák 39', 60', 76' (pen.), 88'; Brezík 85'	Report

Štadión Pasienky, Bratislava
Attendance: 1,829
Referee: Velichko Tsonchev (Bulgaria)

Inter Bratislava won 16–0 on aggregate.

27 September 1983
17:30

St. Gallen (Switzerland)	1–2	(Socialist Federal Republic of Yugoslavia) Radnički Niš
Ritter 65'	Report	Mitošević 62'; Aleksić 82'

Espenmoos, St. Gallen
Attendance: 10,200
Referee: Emilio Soriano Aladrén (Spain)

Radnički Niš won 5–1 on aggregate.

27 September 1983
20:00

Royal Antwerp (Belgium)	4–2	(Switzerland) FC Zürich
Fazekas 50' (pen.), 84'; Petrović 74'; Van Der Linden 76'	Report	Landolt 69'; Rufer 80'

Bosuilstadion, Antwerp
Attendance: 12,500
Referee: Howard King (Wales)

Royal Antwerp won 8–3 on aggregate.

28 September 1983
14:30

Budapest Honvéd (Hungary)	3–0 (a.e.t.)	(Greece) AEL
Dajka 53', 70', 115'	Report

Szent Imre herceg útjai Stadion, Budapest
Attendance: 10,000
Referee: Franz Latzin (Austria)

Budapest Honvéd won 3–2 on aggregate.

28 September 1983
15:00

Lokomotive Leipzig (East Germany)	4–0	(France) Bordeaux
Schöne 11'; Dennstedt 13'; Richter 34', 73'	Report

Bruno-Plache-Stadion, Leipzig
Attendance: 24,500
Referee: Edvard Sostarić (Yugoslavia)

Lokomotive Leipzig won 7–2 on aggregate.

28 September 1983
16:30

Coleraine (Northern Ireland)	1–1	(Netherlands) Sparta Rotterdam
Healy 63'	Report	Holverda 51'

The Showgrounds, Coleraine
Attendance: 1,500
Referee: Rolf Haugen (Norway)

Sparta Rotterdam won 5–1 on aggregate.

28 September 1983
17:30

HJK (Finland)	0–5	(Soviet Union) Spartak Moscow
	Report	Gavrilov 13', 28', 57' (pen.), 82' (pen.); Cherenkov 43'

Helsingin Olympiastadion, Helsinki
Attendance: 1,796
Referee: Włodzimierz Bródka (Poland)

Spartak Moscow won 7–0 on aggregate.

28 September 1983
17:30

Red Star Belgrade (Socialist Federal Republic of Yugoslavia)	2–3	(Italy) Verona
B. Ǵurovski 17'; M. Ǵurovski 58'	Report	Sacchetti 34'; Galderisi 65', 83'

Red Star Stadium, Belgrade
Attendance: 75,000
Referee: George Courtney (England)

Verona won 4–2 on aggregate.

28 September 1983
18:00

Hajduk Split (Socialist Federal Republic of Yugoslavia)	1–0 (a.e.t.)	(Romania) Universitatea Craiova
Vujović 63'	Report
Penalties
Vulić (penalty scored); Adamović (penalty scored); Čelić (penalty missed); Šalov (penalty scored)	3–1	Irimescu (penalty scored); Beldeanu (penalty missed); Țicleanu (penalty missed); Ungureanu (penalty missed)

Stadion Poljud, Split
Attendance: 50,000
Referee: Horst Brummeier (Austria)

1–1 on aggregate; Hajduk Split won 3–1 on penalties.

28 September 1983
18:00

Vorwärts Frankfurt (East Germany)	0–1	(England) Nottingham Forest
	Report	Bowyer 66'

Stadion der Freundschaft, Frankfurt (Oder)
Attendance: 18,000
Referee: Gerard Geurds (Netherlands)

Nottingham Forest won 3–0 on aggregate.

28 September 1983
18:30

B 1903 (Denmark)	1–1	(Czechoslovakia) Baník Ostrava
Koch 32'	Report	Lička 15'

Gentofte Stadion, Gentofte
Attendance: 612
Referee: Anders Mattsson (Finland)

Baník Ostrava won 6–1 on aggregate.

28 September 1983
18:30

Ferencváros (Hungary)	0–2	(Netherlands) PSV Eindhoven
	Report	Thoresen 26'; Koolhof 55'

Üllői úti Stadion, Budapest
Attendance: 18,000
Referee: Enzo Barbaresco (Italy)

PSV Eindhoven won 6–2 on aggregate.

28 September 1983
19:00

Austria Memphis	10–0	(Luxembourg) Aris Bonnevoie
Magyar 11'; Daxbacher 17'; Nyilasi 20', 25', 69', 89'; Drabits 23', 34'; Polster 65'; Zore 82'	Report

Franz-Horr-Stadion, Vienna
Attendance: 3,000
Referee: Widukind Herrmann (East Germany)

Austria Memphis won 15–0 on aggregate.

28 September 1983
19:00

PAOK (Greece)	3–1	(Bulgaria) Lokomotiv Plovdiv
Kostikos 44'; Skartados 66'; Dimopoulos 75' (pen.)	Report	Eranosyan 13'

Toumba Stadium, Thessaloniki
Attendance: 23,000
Referee: Károly Palotai (Hungary)

PAOK won 5–2 on aggregate.

28 September 1983
19:00

Malmö (Sweden)	1–2	(West Germany) Werder Bremen
Rönnberg 37' (pen.)	Report	Pezzey 47'; Sidka 57'

Malmö Stadion, Malmö
Attendance: 16,950
Referee: Joe Worrall (England)

Werder Bremen won 3–2 on aggregate.

28 September 1983
19:00

Elfsborg (Sweden)	2–2	(Poland) Widzew Łódź
T. Svensson 28'; Bergström 85'	Report	Kajrys 80'; Dziekanowski 84'

Ryavallen, Borås
Attendance: 8,000
Referee: Bernd Stumpf (East Germany)

2–2 on aggregate; Widzew Łódź won on away goals.

28 September 1983
19:30

AGF (Denmark)	1–4	(Scotland) Celtic
Scheepers 76'	Report	MacLeod 20'; McGarvey 26'; Aitken 47'; Provan 80'

Århus Idrætspark, Århus
Attendance: 14,500
Referee: Josef Poucek (Czechoslovakia)

Celtic won 5–1 on aggregate.

28 September 1983
19:30

Sturm Graz (Austria)	0–0	(Romania) Sportul Studențesc
	Report

Bundesstadion Graz-Liebenau, Graz
Attendance: 15,000
Referee: Adonis Vassaras (Greece)

Sturm Graz won 2–1 on aggregate.

28 September 1983
19:30

Levski Sofia (Bulgaria)	1–0	(West Germany) Stuttgart
Valchev 89'	Report

Stadion Vasil Levski, Sofia
Attendance: 65,000
Referee: Roger Schoeters (Belgium)

Levski Sofia won 2–1 on aggregate.

28 September 1983
20:00

Bayern Munich (West Germany)	10–0	(Cyprus) Anorthosis
K.-H. Rummenigge 8', 30'; Augenthaler 17', 41', 80'; M. Rummenigge 19'; Dremmler 26'; Lerby 34'; Del'Haye 75'; Kraus 79'	Report

Olympiastadion, Munich
Attendance: 8,000
Referee: Edwin Borg (Malta)

Bayern Munich won 11–0 on aggregate.

28 September 1983
20:00

Groningen (Netherlands)	3–0	(Spain) Atlético Madrid
Jans 14'; Koeman 78'; Van Dijk 83'	Report

Oosterpark Stadion, Groningen
Attendance: 17,750
Referee: Vojtech Christov (Czechoslovakia)

Groningen won 4–2 on aggregate.

28 September 1983
20:00

Anderlecht (Belgium)	1–1	(Norway) Bryne
Czerniatynski 44'	Report	Mæland 82'

Constant Vanden Stock Stadium, Anderlecht
Attendance: 6,500
Referee: Malcolm Moffatt (Northern Ireland)

Anderlecht won 4–1 on aggregate.

28 September 1983
20:00

Laval (France)	1–0	(Soviet Union) Dynamo Kyiv
Souto 34'	Report

Stade Francis-Le-Basser, Laval
Attendance: 20,000
Referee: Ulrich Nyffenegger (Switzerland)

Laval won 1–0 on aggregate.

28 September 1983
20:00

Carl Zeiss Jena (East Germany)	3–0	(Iceland) ÍBV
Bielau 53', 61'; Trocha 54'	Report

Ernst-Abbe-Sportfeld, Jena
Attendance: 12,500
Referee: Erik Steen Jensen (Denmark)

Carl Zeiss Jena won 3–0 on aggregate.

28 September 1983
20:00

Lens (France)	2–1 (a.e.t.)	(Belgium) Gent
Tłokiński 75'; Piette 92'	Report	Koudijzer 54'

Stade Félix-Bollaert, Lens
Attendance: 34,361
Referee: Walter Eschweiler (West Germany)

Lens won 3–2 on aggregate.

28 September 1983
20:00

Feyenoord (Netherlands)	2–0	(Scotland) St Mirren
Van Til 58'; Zhelyazkov 76'	Report

De Kuip, Rotterdam
Attendance: 18,286
Referee: Augusto Marques Pires (Portugal)

Feyenoord won 3–0 on aggregate.

28 September 1983
20:45

Watford (England)	3–0	(West Germany) Kaiserslautern
Richardson 4', 56'; Melzer 8' (o.g.)	Report

Vicarage Road, Watford
Attendance: 21,457
Referee: Valeri Butenko (Soviet Union)

Watford won 4–3 on aggregate.

28 September 1983
20:45

Tottenham Hotspur (England)	8–0	(Republic of Ireland) Drogheda United
Falco 17', 35'; Roberts 26', 41'; Brazil 50', 74'; Archibald 56'; Hughton 60'	Report

White Hart Lane, London
Attendance: 19,831
Referee: Anthony Briguglio (Malta)

Tottenham Hotspur won 14–0 on aggregate.

28 September 1983
20:45

Internazionale (Italy)	2–0	(Turkey) Trabzonspor
Altobelli 48' (pen.); Collovati 86'	Report

Stadio Dino Manuzzi, Cesena
Attendance: 22,500
Referee: Klaus Scheurell (East Germany)

Internazionale won 2–1 on aggregate.

28 September 1983
20:45

Aston Villa (England)	5–0	(Portugal) Vitória S.C.
Withe 2', 48', 89'; Ormsby 56'; Gibson 74'	Report

Villa Park, Birmingham
Attendance: 23,732
Referee: Werner Föckler (West Germany)

Aston Villa won 5–1 on aggregate.

28 September 1983
21:00

Real Madrid (Spain)	1–1	(Czechoslovakia) Sparta Prague
Isidro 23'	Report	Skuhravý 74'

Santiago Bernabéu, Madrid
Attendance: 58,800
Referee: Alexis Ponnet (Belgium)

Sparta Prague won 4–3 on aggregate.

28 September 1983
22:00

Sporting CP (Portugal)	3–2	(Spain) Sevilla
Buyo 33' (o.g.); Mário Jorge 59'; Oliveira 88'	Report	Montero 27'; Francisco 47'

Estádio José Alvalade, Lisbon
Attendance: 65,000
Referee: Luigi Agnolin (Italy)

Sporting CP won 4–3 on aggregate.

== Second round ==
Team 1	Agg.	Team 2	1st leg	2nd leg
Budapest Honvéd (Hungary)	3–5	(Socialist Federal Republic of Yugoslavia) Hajduk Split	3–2	0–3
Groningen (Netherlands)	3–5	(Italy) Internazionale	2–0	1–5
Spartak Moscow (Soviet Union)	4–3	(England) Aston Villa	2–2	2–1
Austria Memphis	5–3	(France) Laval	2–0	3–3
Verona (Italy)	2–2 (a)	(Austria) Sturm Graz	2–2	0–0
Lokomotive Leipzig (East Germany)	2–1	(West Germany) Werder Bremen	1–0	1–1
PAOK (Greece)	0–0 (8–9 p)	(West Germany) Bayern Munich	0–0	0–0 (a.e.t.)
PSV Eindhoven (Netherlands)	1–3	(England) Nottingham Forest	1–2	0–1
Anderlecht (Belgium)	4–2	(Czechoslovakia) Baník Ostrava	2–0	2–2
Radnički Niš (Socialist Federal Republic of Yugoslavia)	6–3	(Czechoslovakia) Inter Bratislava	4–0	2–3
Lens (France)	5–4	(Belgium) Royal Antwerp	2–2	3–2
Sparta Rotterdam (Netherlands)	4–3	(East Germany) Carl Zeiss Jena	3–2	1–1
Sporting CP (Portugal)	2–5	(Scotland) Celtic	2–0	0–5
Tottenham Hotspur (England)	6–2	(Netherlands) Feyenoord	4–2	2–0
Watford (England)	4–2	(Bulgaria) Levski Sofia	1–1	3–1 (a.e.t.)
Widzew Łódź (Poland)	1–3	(Czechoslovakia) Sparta Prague	1–0	0–3

=== First leg ===
19 October 1983
13:30

Widzew Łódź (Poland)	1–0	(Czechoslovakia) Sparta Prague
Wójcicki 42'	Report

Hetman Stadium, Białystok
Attendance: 25,250
Referee: Ioan Igna (Romania)

19 October 1983
14:00

Lokomotive Leipzig (East Germany)	1–0	(West Germany) Werder Bremen
Richter 35'	Report

Bruno-Plache-Stadion, Leipzig
Attendance: 25,500
Referee: Alphonse Constantin (Belgium)

19 October 1983
14:30

Budapest Honvéd (Hungary)	3–2	(Socialist Federal Republic of Yugoslavia) Hajduk Split
Dajka 32'; Bodonyi 41'; Varga 89' (pen.)	Report	Cukrov 38'; Pešić 53'

Szent Imre herceg útjai Stadion, Budapest
Attendance: 5,000
Referee: Widukind Herrmann (East Germany)

19 October 1983
16:00

PAOK (Greece)	0–0	(West Germany) Bayern Munich
	Report

Toumba Stadium, Thessaloniki
Attendance: 33,500
Referee: Gino Menicucci (Italy)

19 October 1983
17:00

Spartak Moscow (Soviet Union)	2–2	(England) Aston Villa
Gavrilov 52', 89' (pen.)	Report	Gibson 47'; Walters 68'

Central Dynamo Stadium, Moscow
Attendance: 50,400
Referee: Roger Schoeters (Belgium)

19 October 1983
17:00

Radnički Niš (Socialist Federal Republic of Yugoslavia)	4–0	(Czechoslovakia) Inter Bratislava
Mitošević 18', 55'; Stojković 59'; Beganović 67' (pen.)	Report

Stadion Čair, Niš
Attendance: 18,000
Referee: László Pádár (Hungary)

19 October 1983
19:30

Austria Memphis	2–0	(France) Laval
Prohaska 19' (pen.); Magyar 44'	Report

Franz-Horr-Stadion, Vienna
Attendance: 7,000
Referee: Yordan Zhezhov (Bulgaria)

19 October 1983
19:30

PSV Eindhoven (Netherlands)	1–2	(England) Nottingham Forest
Koolhof 84' (pen.)	Report	Davenport 51'; Walsh 90' (pen.)

Philips Sportpark, Eindhoven
Attendance: 27,000
Referee: Aron Schmidhuber (West Germany)

19 October 1983
20:00

Groningen (Netherlands)	2–0	(Italy) Internazionale
Koeman 16'; Fandi 89'	Report

Oosterpark Stadion, Groningen
Attendance: 17,500
Referee: Brian McGinlay (Scotland)

19 October 1983
20:00

Anderlecht (Belgium)	2–0	(Czechoslovakia) Baník Ostrava
Brylle 64'; Arnesen 80'	Report

Constant Vanden Stock Stadium, Brussels
Attendance: 12,000
Referee: Keith Hackett (England)

19 October 1983
20:00

Sparta Rotterdam (Netherlands)	3–2	(East Germany) Carl Zeiss Jena
Holverda 45'; Van den Berg 69'; Lengkeek 75'	Report	Bielau 49'; Ludwig 85'

Sparta Stadion, Rotterdam
Attendance: 8,000
Referee: Howard King (Wales)

19 October 1983
20:30

Verona (Italy)	2–2	(Austria) Sturm Graz
Fanna 12'; Galderisi 45'	Report	Szokolai 18'; Jurtin 26'

Stadio Marcantonio Bentegodi, Verona
Attendance: 33,844
Referee: Joël Quiniou (France)

19 October 1983
20:30

Lens (France)	2–2	(Belgium) Royal Antwerp
Flak 74'; Peltier 83'	Report	Cnops 22', 26'

Stade Félix-Bollaert, Lens
Attendance: 35,500
Referee: Oliver Donnelly (Northern Ireland)

19 October 1983
20:45

Tottenham Hotspur (England)	4–2	(Netherlands) Feyenoord
Galvin 8', 14'; Archibald 36', 40'	Report	Cruijff 75'; Nielsen 81'

White Hart Lane, London
Attendance: 35,404
Referee: Emilio Carlos Guruceta (Spain)

19 October 1983
20:45

Watford (England)	1–1	(Bulgaria) Levski Sofia
Rostron 43'	Report	Gochev 74'

Vicarage Road, Watford
Attendance: 16,139
Referee: Georges Konrath (France)

19 October 1983
22:00

Sporting CP (Portugal)	2–0	(Scotland) Celtic
Jordão 29', 65'	Report

Estádio José Alvalade, Lisbon
Attendance: 57,500
Referee: Horst Brummeier (Austria)

=== Second leg ===
2 November 1983
16:30

Sparta Prague (Czechoslovakia)	3–0	(Poland) Widzew Łódź
Procházka 32'; Griga 39'; Skuhravý 83'	Report

Stadion Letná, Prague
Attendance: 26,000
Referee: Valeri Butenko (Soviet Union)

Sparta Prague won 3–1 on aggregate.

2 November 1983
17:00

Hajduk Split (Socialist Federal Republic of Yugoslavia)	3–0	(Hungary) Budapest Honvéd
Pešić 14', 61'; Zlatko Vujović 85'	Report

Stadion Poljud, Split
Attendance: 50,000
Referee: John Carpenter (Republic of Ireland)

Hajduk Split won 5–3 on aggregate.

2 November 1983
17:00

Baník Ostrava (Czechoslovakia)	2–2	(Belgium) Anderlecht
Válek 17'; Lička 59'	Report	Brylle 9'; Vandenbergh 57'

Bazaly, Ostrava
Attendance: 13,533
Referee: Ron Bridges (Wales)

Anderlecht won 4–2 on aggregate.

2 November 1983
17:00

Inter Bratislava (Czechoslovakia)	3–2	(Socialist Federal Republic of Yugoslavia) Radnički Niš
Michalec 19'; Reznák 33'; Moravec 44'	Report	S. Gavrilović 25'; Aleksić 89'

Štadión Pasienky, Bratislava
Attendance: 3,000
Referee: Kenny Hope (Scotland)

Radnički Niš won 6–3 on aggregate.

2 November 1983
17:00

Carl Zeiss Jena (East Germany)	1–1	(Netherlands) Sparta Rotterdam
Schnuphase 59'	Report	Van den Berg 84'

Ernst-Abbe-Sportfeld, Jena
Attendance: 12,000
Referee: Gérard Biguet (France)

Sparta Rotterdam won 4–3 on aggregate.

2 November 1983
17:30

Levski Sofia (Bulgaria)	1–3 (a.e.t.)	(England) Watford
Spasov 6' (pen.)	Report	Callaghan 9'; Rostron 116'; Richardson 117'

Stadion Vasil Levski, Sofia
Attendance: 60,000
Referee: Erik Fredriksson (Sweden)

Watford won 4–2 on aggregate.

2 November 1983
18:30

Sturm Graz (Austria)	0–0	(Italy) Verona
	Report

Bundesstadion Graz-Liebenau, Graz
Attendance: 21,500
Referee: László Győri (Hungary)

2–2 on aggregate; Sturm Graz won on away goals.

2 November 1983
20:00

Laval (France)	3–3	Austria Memphis
Sène 21'; Miton 38'; Stéfanini 42'	Report	Baumeister 51', 56'; Pérard 65' (o.g.)

Stade Francis-Le-Basser, Laval
Attendance: 18,000
Referee: George Courtney (England)

Austria Memphis won 5–3 on aggregate.

2 November 1983
20:00

Werder Bremen (West Germany)	1–1	(East Germany) Lokomotive Leipzig
Völler 72'	Report	Schöne 17'

Weserstadion, Bremen
Attendance: 36,000
Referee: Victoriano Sánchez Arminio (Spain)

Lokomotive Leipzig won 2–1 on aggregate.

2 November 1983
20:00

Bayern Munich (West Germany)	0–0 (a.e.t.)	(Greece) PAOK
	Report
Penalties
Augenthaler (penalty scored); Hoeneß (penalty missed); Kraus (penalty scored); Nachtweih (penalty scored); Lerby (penalty scored); Del'Haye (penalty scored); Dürnberger (penalty scored); M. Rummenigge (penalty scored); Pflügler (penalty scored); Pfaff (penalty scored)	9–8	(penalty scored) Kostikos; (penalty scored) Dimopoulos; (penalty scored) Skartados; (penalty scored) Vasilakos; (penalty missed) Damanakis; (penalty scored) Alavantas; (penalty scored) Alexandridis; (penalty scored) Psarras; (penalty scored) Baniotis; (penalty missed) Malioufas

Olympiastadion, Munich
Attendance: 30,000
Referee: Alan Robinson (England)

0–0 on aggregate; Bayern Munich won 9–8 on penalties.

2 November 1983
20:00

Royal Antwerp (Belgium)	2–3	(France) Lens
Boeckstaens 55'; Van der Elst 88' (pen.)	Report	Boeckstaens 22' (o.g.); Xuereb 25'; Brisson 46'

Bosuilstadion, Antwerp
Attendance: 22,600
Referee: Jakob Baumann (Switzerland)

Lens won 5–4 on aggregate.

2 November 1983
20:00

Feyenoord (Netherlands)	0–2	(England) Tottenham Hotspur
	Report	Hughton 25'; Galvin 84'

De Kuip, Rotterdam
Attendance: 54,600
Referee: Luigi Agnolin (Italy)

Tottenham Hotspur won 6–2 on aggregate.

2 November 1983
20:30

Internazionale (Italy)	5–1	(Netherlands) Groningen
Collovati 53'; Altobelli 55' (pen.); Serena 59', 89'; Müller 78'	Report	McDonald 61'

Stadio della Vittoria, Bari
Attendance: 40,000
Referee: Alain Delmer (France)

Internazionale won 5–3 on aggregate.

2 November 1983
20:30

Aston Villa (England)	1–2	(Soviet Union) Spartak Moscow
Withe 2'	Report	Cherenkov 46', 89'

Villa Park, Birmingham
Attendance: 29,511
Referee: Egbert Mulder (Netherlands)

Spartak Moscow won 4–3 on aggregate.

2 November 1983
20:30

Nottingham Forest (England)	1–0	(Netherlands) PSV Eindhoven
Davenport 56'	Report

City Ground, Nottingham
Attendance: 16,943
Referee: Zoran Petrović (Yugoslavia)

Nottingham Forest won 3–1 on aggregate.

2 November 1983
20:30

Celtic (Scotland)	5–0	(Portugal) Sporting CP
Burns 18'; McAdam 43'; McClair 44'; MacLeod 58'; McGarvey 59'	Report

Celtic Park, Glasgow
Attendance: 39,183
Referee: Alexis Ponnet (Belgium)

Celtic won 5–2 on aggregate.

== Third round ==
Team 1	Agg.	Team 2	1st leg	2nd leg
Bayern Munich (West Germany)	1–2	(England) Tottenham Hotspur	1–0	0–2
Austria Memphis	3–2	(Italy) Internazionale	2–1	1–1
Nottingham Forest (England)	2–1	(Scotland) Celtic	0–0	2–1
Radnički Niš (Socialist Federal Republic of Yugoslavia)	0–4	(Socialist Federal Republic of Yugoslavia) Hajduk Split	0–2	0–2
Lens (France)	1–2	(Belgium) Anderlecht	1–1	0–1
Sturm Graz (Austria)	2–1	(East Germany) Lokomotive Leipzig	2–0	0–1
Sparta Rotterdam (Netherlands)	1–3	(Soviet Union) Spartak Moscow	1–1	0–2
Watford (England)	2–7	(Czechoslovakia) Sparta Prague	2–3	0–4

=== First leg ===
23 November 1983
13:30

Radnički Niš (Socialist Federal Republic of Yugoslavia)	0–2	(Socialist Federal Republic of Yugoslavia) Hajduk Split
	Report	Zlatko Vujović 43'; Vulić 53'

Stadion Čair, Niš
Attendance: 20,002
Referee: Dušan Krchnák (Czechoslovakia)

23 November 1983
19:00

Austria Memphis	2–1	(Italy) Internazionale
Nyilasi 78', 83'	Report	Muraro 53'

Praterstadion, Vienna
Attendance: 16,000
Referee: John Carpenter (Republic of Ireland)

23 November 1983
19:00

Sturm Graz (Austria)	2–0	(East Germany) Lokomotive Leipzig
Jurtin 14', 24'	Report

Bundesstadion Graz-Liebenau, Graz
Attendance: 16,000
Referee: Keith Hackett (England)

23 November 1983
20:00

Bayern Munich (West Germany)	1–0	(England) Tottenham Hotspur
M. Rummenigge 86'	Report

Olympiastadion, Munich
Attendance: 20,000
Referee: Jan Keizer (Netherlands)

23 November 1983
20:00

Sparta Rotterdam (Netherlands)	1–1	(Soviet Union) Spartak Moscow
de Wolf 80' (pen.)	Report	Rodionov 33'

Sparta Stadion, Rotterdam
Attendance: 14,500
Referee: Raúl Fernandes Nazaré (Portugal)

23 November 1983
20:30

Lens (France)	1–1	(Belgium) Anderlecht
Munaron 89' (o.g.)	Report	Vandenbergh 87'

Stade Félix-Bollaert, Lens
Attendance: 34,374
Referee: David Syme (Scotland)

23 November 1983
20:45

Watford (England)	2–3	(Czechoslovakia) Sparta Prague
Rostron 66'; Gilligan 83'	Report	Berger 25'; Griga 30'; Ščasný 89'

Vicarage Road, Watford
Attendance: 15,590
Referee: Aron Schmidhuber (West Germany)

23 November 1983
21:00

Nottingham Forest (England)	0–0	(Scotland) Celtic
	Report

City Ground, Nottingham
Attendance: 32,017
Referee: Emilio Soriano Aladrén (Spain)

=== Second leg ===
7 December 1983
13:00

Lokomotive Leipzig (East Germany)	1–0	(Austria) Sturm Graz
Zötzsche 12'	Report

Bruno-Plache-Stadion, Leipzig
Attendance: 21,000
Referee: Ulf Eriksson (Sweden)

Sturm Graz won 2–1 on aggregate.

7 December 1983
16:00

Hajduk Split (Socialist Federal Republic of Yugoslavia)	2–0	(Socialist Federal Republic of Yugoslavia) Radnički Niš
Zlatko Vujović 61', 71'	Report

Stadion Poljud, Split
Attendance: 25,000
Referee: Enzo Barbaresco (Italy)

Hajduk Split won 4–0 on aggregate.

7 December 1983
17:00

Sparta Prague (Czechoslovakia)	4–0	(England) Watford
Chovanec 3'; Beznoska 9'; Skuhravý 29'; Jarolím 42'	Report

Stadion Letná, Prague
Attendance: 37,000
Referee: Talat Tokat (Turkey)

Sparta Prague won 7–2 on aggregate.

7 December 1983
20:00

Anderlecht (Belgium)	1–0	(France) Lens
De Greef 38'	Report

Constant Vanden Stock Stadium, Brussels
Attendance: 39,000
Referee: Siegfried Kirschen (East Germany)

Anderlecht won 2–1 on aggregate.

7 December 1983
20:30

Internazionale (Italy)	1–1	Austria Memphis
Bagni 79'	Report	Magyar 72'

Stadio Giuseppe Meazza, Milan
Attendance: 69,659
Referee: Alexis Ponnet (Belgium)

Austria Memphis won 3–2 on aggregate.

7 December 1983
20:35

Celtic (Scotland)	1–2	(England) Nottingham Forest
MacLeod 79'	Report	Hodge 53'; Walsh 74'

Celtic Park, Glasgow
Attendance: 66,938
Referee: André Daina (Switzerland)

Nottingham Forest won 2–1 on aggregate.

7 December 1983
21:00

Tottenham Hotspur (England)	2–0	(West Germany) Bayern Munich
Archibald 53'; Falco 87'	Report

White Hart Lane, London
Attendance: 41,977
Referee: Alain Delmer (France)

Tottenham Hotspur won 2–1 on aggregate.

7 December 1983
17:00

Spartak Moscow (Soviet Union)	2–0	(Netherlands) Sparta Rotterdam
Gladilin 42', 79'	Report

Lenin Dinamo Stadium, Tbilisi
Attendance: 37,900
Referee: Einar Halle (Norway)

Spartak Moscow won 3–1 on aggregate.

== Quarter-finals ==
Team 1	Agg.	Team 2	1st leg	2nd leg
Sparta Prague (Czechoslovakia)	1–2	(Socialist Federal Republic of Yugoslavia) Hajduk Split	1–0	0–2 (a.e.t.)
Nottingham Forest (England)	2–1	(Austria) Sturm Graz	1–0	1–1 (a.e.t.)
Anderlecht (Belgium)	4–3	(Soviet Union) Spartak Moscow	4–2	0–1
Tottenham Hotspur (England)	4–2	Austria Memphis	2–0	2–2

=== First leg ===
7 March 1984
17:00

Sparta Prague (Czechoslovakia)	1–0	(Socialist Federal Republic of Yugoslavia) Hajduk Split
Hašek 50'	Report

Stadion Letná, Prague
Attendance: 38,000
Referee: Howard King (Wales)

7 March 1984
20:00

Anderlecht (Belgium)	4–2	(Soviet Union) Spartak Moscow
Brylle 28' (pen.), 43', 85' (pen.); Vercauteren 81'	Report	Rodionov 18'; Gladilin 84'

Constant Vanden Stock Stadium, Brussels
Attendance: 29,800
Referee: Paolo Bergamo (Italy)

7 March 1984
20:30

Nottingham Forest (England)	1–0	(Austria) Sturm Graz
Hart 70'	Report

City Ground, Nottingham
Attendance: 19,459
Referee: Vojtech Christov (Czechoslovakia)

7 March 1984
21:00

Tottenham Hotspur (England)	2–0	Austria Memphis
Archibald 58'; Brazil 67'	Report

White Hart Lane, London
Attendance: 34,069
Referee: Edvard Sostarić (Yugoslavia)

=== Second leg ===
21 March 1984
17:30

Hajduk Split (Socialist Federal Republic of Yugoslavia)	2–0 (a.e.t.)	(Czechoslovakia) Sparta Prague
Gudelj 18'; Slišković 119'	Report

Stadion Poljud, Split
Attendance: 52,500
Referee: Bob Valentine (Scotland)

Hajduk Split won 2–1 on aggregate.

21 March 1984
19:30

Sturm Graz (Austria)	1–1 (a.e.t.)	(England) Nottingham Forest
Bakota 44' (pen.)	Report	Walsh 114' (pen.)

Bundesstadion Graz-Liebenau, Graz
Attendance: 21,000
Referee: Romualdas Yushka (Soviet Union)

Nottingham Forest won 2–1 on aggregate.

21 March 1984
19:30

Austria Memphis	2–2	(England) Tottenham Hotspur
Prohaska 63' (pen.); Nyilasi 88'	Report	Brazil 12'; Ardiles 82'

Praterstadion, Vienna
Attendance: 31,000
Referee: Adolf Prokop (East Germany)

Tottenham Hotspur won 4–2 on aggregate.

21 March 1984
23:00

Spartak Moscow (Soviet Union)	1–0	(Belgium) Anderlecht
Rodionov 89'	Report

Lenin Dinamo Stadium, Tbilisi
Attendance: 51,000
Referee: André Daina (Switzerland)

Anderlecht won 4–3 on aggregate.

== Semi-finals ==
Team 1	Agg.	Team 2	1st leg	2nd leg
Hajduk Split (Socialist Federal Republic of Yugoslavia)	2–2 (a)	(England) Tottenham Hotspur	2–1	0–1
Nottingham Forest (England)	2–3	(Belgium) Anderlecht	2–0	0–3

In 1997, it was revealed that the Anderlecht chairman Constant Vanden Stock had paid a £27,000 bribe to the referee Emilio Guruceta Muro in exchange for help fixing their semi-final second leg match versus Nottingham Forest. During the match, Anderlecht were awarded a dubious penalty, and a last minute Nottingham Forest goal – that would have won them the tie on the away goals rule – was disallowed. In 2016, it emerged that UEFA had known about the bribe since 1993 but had taken no action until the information was made public in 1997, when UEFA suspended Anderlecht from the next European tournament for which they qualified. On qualifying for the 1998–99 UEFA Cup, Anderlecht appealed the suspension in the Court of Arbitration for Sport, which overturned the ban on the grounds that it was made by UEFA's executive committee, which did not have the authority to issue the ban.

=== First leg ===
11 April 1984
20:00

Hajduk Split (Socialist Federal Republic of Yugoslavia)	2–1	(England) Tottenham Hotspur
Gudelj 67'; Pešić 77'	Report	Falco 19'

Stadion Poljud, Split
Attendance: 35,000
Referee: Robert Wurtz (France)

The match featured an infamous incident that saw a Hajduk fan run onto the pitch before the start of the second half with a live rooster – in reference to Tottenham's club symbol, the cockerel – and, while standing at the centre circle, kill the animal by snapping its neck. The contest took place as scheduled, however, as a result of the incident, Hajduk were fined CHF3,000 and ordered to play their next European tie at least 300 km away from their home stadium. That tie turned out to be their 1984–85 European Cup Winners' Cup first round match against Dynamo Moscow.

11 April 1984
20:30

Nottingham Forest (England)	2–0	(Belgium) Anderlecht
Hodge 84', 88'	Report

City Ground, Nottingham
Attendance: 22,681
Referee: Horst Brummeier (Austria)

=== Second leg ===
25 April 1984
20:00

Anderlecht (Belgium)	3–0	(England) Nottingham Forest
Scifo 18'; Brylle 60' (pen.); Vandenbergh 88'	Report

Constant Vanden Stock Stadium, Brussels
Attendance: 36,500
Referee: Emilio Guruceta Muro (Spain)

Anderlecht won 3–2 on aggregate.

25 April 1984
21:00

Tottenham Hotspur (England)	1–0	(Socialist Federal Republic of Yugoslavia) Hajduk Split
Hazard 6'	Report

White Hart Lane, London
Attendance: 43,969
Referee: Paolo Casarin (Italy)

2–2 on aggregate; Tottenham Hotspur won on away goals.

== Final ==
=== First leg ===
9 May 1984
20:00

Anderlecht (Belgium)	1–1	(England) Tottenham Hotspur
Olsen 85'	Report	Miller 57'

Constant Vanden Stock Stadium, Brussels
Attendance: 40,000
Referee: Bruno Galler (Switzerland)

=== Second leg ===
23 May 1984
21:00

Tottenham Hotspur (England)	1–1 (a.e.t.)	(Belgium) Anderlecht
Roberts 84'	Report	Czerniatynski 60'
Penalties
Roberts (penalty scored); Falco (penalty scored); Stevens (penalty scored); Archibald (penalty scored); Thomas (penalty missed)	4–3	(penalty missed) Olsen; (penalty scored) Grün; (penalty scored) Scifo; (penalty scored) Vercauteren; (penalty missed) Guðjohnsen

White Hart Lane, London
Attendance: 46,205
Referee: Volker Roth (West Germany)

2–2 on aggregate; Tottenham Hotspur won 4–3 on penalties.

== Top scorers ==
Name	Club	Goals	Minutes
(Hungary) Tibor Nyilasi	Austria Memphis	9	699
(Denmark) Kenneth Brylle	(Belgium) Anderlecht	6	631
(Soviet Union) Yuri Gavrilov	(Soviet Union) Spartak Moscow	6	720
(England) Mark Falco	(England) Tottenham Hotspur	6	904
(Czechoslovakia) Marián Tomčák	(Czechoslovakia) Inter Bratislava	5	197
(Czechoslovakia) Karol Brezík	(Czechoslovakia) Inter Bratislava	5	295
(East Germany) Hans Richter	(East Germany) Lokomotive Leipzig	5	540
(Austria) Herbert Prohaska	Austria Memphis	5	720
(Scotland) Steve Archibald	(England) Tottenham Hotspur	5	990
