= 1984–85 European Cup Winners' Cup =

Tournament details
- Dates: 19 September 1984 – 15 May 1985
- Teams: 32

Final positions
- Champions: (England) Everton (1st title)
- Runners-up: (Austria) Rapid Wien

Tournament statistics
- Matches played: 62
- Goals scored: 163 (2.63 per match)
- Attendance: 1,174,964 (18,951 per match)
- Top scorer(s): Valery Gazzaev (Dynamo Moscow); Andy Gray (Everton); Antonín Panenka (Rapid Wien); 5 goals each

The 1984–85 season of the European Cup Winners' Cup was won by Everton in the final against Rapid Wien.

Everton also won the English Football League that season and would therefore have entered the European Cup the following season. However, Everton were unable to do so due to the newly enacted 5-year ban on English clubs participating in European competitions as a consequence of the Heysel stadium disaster in May of the same year. Everton's 1985 trophy win was therefore the last English club success in European competition until Manchester United won this competition again in 1991.

This would also be the last time Everton participated in European competition until the 1995–96 UEFA Cup Winners' Cup, following its 1994–95 FA Cup win. The Albanian cupwinners also retired for political reasons and were consequently disqualified.

== First round ==
Team 1	Agg.	Team 2	1st leg	2nd leg
Bayern Munich (West Germany)	6–2	(Norway) Moss	4–1	2–1
Trakia Plovdiv (Bulgaria)	5–1	Union Luxembourg	4–0	1–1
Roma (Italy)	1–0	(Romania) Steaua București	1–0	0–0
Wrexham (Wales)	4–4 (a)	(Portugal) Porto	1–0	3–4
Internacionál Slovnaft Bratislava (Czechoslovakia)	2–1	(Finland) Kuusysi	2–1	0–0
UCD (Republic of Ireland)	0–1	(England) Everton	0–0	0–1
KB (Denmark)	0–3	(Netherlands) Fortuna Sittard	0–0	0–3
Wisła Kraków (Poland)	7–3	(Iceland) ÍBV	4–2	3–1
Malmö FF (Sweden)	3–4	(East Germany) Dynamo Dresden	2–0	1–4
Metz (France)	6–5	(Spain) Barcelona	2–4	4–1
Rapid Wien (Austria)	5–2	(Turkey) Beşiktaş	4–1	1–1
Gent (Belgium)	1–3	(Scotland) Celtic	1–0	0–3
Siófoki Bányász (Hungary)	1–3	(Greece) AEL	1–1	0–2
APOEL (Cyprus)	1–6	(Switzerland) Servette	0–3	1–3
Dynamo Moscow (Soviet Union)	6–2	(Socialist Federal Republic of Yugoslavia) Hajduk Split	1–0	5–2^{1}
Ballymena United (Northern Ireland)	1–3	(Malta) Ħamrun Spartans	0–1	1–2

^{1}The return leg of the Dynamo Moscow-Hajduk Split tie was played at Gradski Vrt Stadium in Osijek instead of Hajduk Split's home ground in Split due to the club being punished by UEFA over a bizarre incident before their 1983–84 UEFA Cup semifinal first leg match against Tottenham Hotspur, when a Hajduk fan ran onto the pitch prior to kickoff with a live rooster and killed it by snapping its neck. Part of the punishment for Hajduk Split was being required to play home matches at least 300 km away from their home stadium.

=== First leg ===
18 September 1984

Rapid Wien (Austria)	4–1	(Turkey) Beşiktaş
Panenka 12' (pen.), 56', 66' (pen.); Bručić 25'	Report	Kovačević 11'

Gerhard-Hanappi-Stadion, Vienna
Attendance: 8,400
Referee: Pietro D'Elia (Italy)

19 September 1984

Bayern Munich (West Germany)	4–1	(Norway) Moss
Pflügler 31', 54'; Wohlfarth 69'; Nachtweih 77'	Report	Kollshaugen 2'

Olympiastadion, Munich
Attendance: 5,000
Referee: Krzysztof Czemarmazowicz (Poland)

19 September 1984

Trakia Plovdiv (Bulgaria)	4–0	Union Luxembourg
Pashev 54'; Stoinov 63'; Georgiev 69'; Kostadinov 77' (pen.)	Report

Stadion Deveti Septemvri, Plovdiv
Attendance: 5,262
Referee: Hiqmet Kuka (Albania)

19 September 1984

Roma (Italy)	1–0	(Romania) Steaua București
Graziani 73'	Report

Stadio Olimpico, Rome
Attendance: 24,949
Referee: Robert Wurtz (France)

19 September 1984

Wrexham (Wales)	1–0	(Portugal) Porto
Steel 77'	Report

Racecourse Ground, Wrexham
Attendance: 4,935
Referee: Jean-François Crucke (Belgium)

19 September 1984

Internacionál Slovnaft Bratislava (Czechoslovakia)	2–1	(Finland) Kuusysi Lahti
Brezík 42'; Moravec 65'	Report	Törnvall 4'

Štadión Pasienky, Bratislava
Attendance: 2,464
Referee: Yordan Zhezhov (Bulgaria)

19 September 1984

UCD (Republic of Ireland)	0–0	(England) Everton
	Report

Tolka Park, Dublin
Attendance: 6,260
Referee: Keith Cooper (Wales)

19 September 1984

KB (Denmark)	0–0	(Netherlands) Fortuna Sittard
	Report

Frederiksberg Idrætspark, Copenhagen
Attendance: 1,885
Referee: Bernd Stumpf (East Germany)

19 September 1984

Wisła Kraków (Poland)	4–2	(Iceland) ÍBV
Wróbel 19'; Nawałka 20'; Banaszkiewicz 31', 67'	Report	Elíasson 40'; Georgsson 44' (pen.)

Stadion Wisły, Kraków
Attendance: 3,500
Referee: Klaus Peschel (East Germany)

19 September 1984

Malmö FF (Sweden)	2–0	(East Germany) Dynamo Dresden
Magnusson 44', 64'	Report

Malmö Stadion, Malmö
Attendance: 3,434
Referee: Aleksandr Mushkovets (Soviet Union)

19 September 1984

Metz (France)	2–4	(Spain) Barcelona
Kurbos 44'; Rohr 87' (pen.)	Report	Sonor 12' (o.g.); Schuster 47'; Calderé 53'; Carrasco 64'

Stade Saint-Symphorien, Metz
Attendance: 17,403
Referee: Jan Keizer (Netherlands)

19 September 1984

Gent (Belgium)	1–0	(Scotland) Celtic
Cordiez 73'	Report

Jules Ottenstadion, Ghent
Attendance: 12,291
Referee: Alder dos Santos (Portugal)

19 September 1984

Siófoki Bányász (Hungary)	1–1	(Greece) AEL
Tieber 68'	Report	Adamczyk 29'

Sóstói Stadion, Székesfehérvár
Attendance: 5,469
Referee: Wiesław Karolak (Poland)

19 September 1984

APOEL (Cyprus)	0–3	(Switzerland) Servette
	Report	Decastel 40'; Brigger 79'; Favre 84'

Makario Stadio, Nicosia
Attendance: 7,779
Referee: Mircea Neşu (Romania)

19 September 1984

Dynamo Moscow (Soviet Union)	1–0	(Socialist Federal Republic of Yugoslavia) Hajduk Split
Argudyayev 9'	Report

Stadion Dinamo, Moscow
Attendance: 14,200
Referee: Luigi Agnolin (Italy)

19 September 1984

Ballymena United (Northern Ireland)	0–1	(Malta) Ħamrun Spartans
	Report	R. Xuereb 19'

Ballymena Showgrounds, Ballymena
Attendance: 1,906
Referee: Joe Worrall (England)

=== Second leg ===
26 September 1984

Ħamrun Spartans (Malta)	2–1	(Northern Ireland) Ballymena United
R. Xuereb 43', 66' (pen.)	Report	Beattie 7'

Ta' Qali National Stadium, Ta' Qali
Attendance: 11,350
Referee: Claudio Pieri (Italy)

Ħamrun Spartans won 3–1 on aggregate.

2 October 1984

Everton (England)	1–0	(Republic of Ireland) UCD
Sharp 10'	Report

Goodison Park, Liverpool
Attendance: 16,277
Referee: Frederick McKnight (Northern Ireland)

Everton won 1–0 on aggregate.

3 October 1984

Moss (Norway)	1–2	(West Germany) Bayern Munich
Kollshaugen 87'	Report	Wohlfarth 23'; Rummenigge 48'

Melløs Stadion, Moss
Attendance: 4,600
Referee: Simo Ruokonen (Finland)

Bayern Munich won 6–2 on aggregate.

3 October 1984

Union Luxembourg	1–1	(Bulgaria) Trakia Plovdiv
Thines 74'	Report	Stoinov 15'

Stade Achille Hammerel, Luxembourg City
Attendance: 341
Referee: Karl-Josef Assenmacher (West Germany)

Trakia Plovdiv won 5–1 on aggregate.

3 October 1984

Steaua București (Romania)	0–0	(Italy) Roma
	Report

Stadionul Steaua, Bucharest
Attendance: 25,000
Referee: Bruno Galler (Switzerland)

Roma won 1–0 on aggregate.

3 October 1984

Porto (Portugal)	4–3	(Wales) Wrexham
Gomes 5', 38' (pen.); Magalhães 18'; Futre 61'	Report	King 39', 43'; Horne 89'

Estádio das Antas, Porto
Attendance: 35,000
Referee: Albert Thomas (Netherlands)

4–4 on aggregate. Wrexham won on away goals.

3 October 1984

Fortuna Sittard (Netherlands)	3–0	(Denmark) KB
Holverda 35', 73'; Hoyer 68'	Report

De Baandert, Sittard
Attendance: 11,386
Referee: José Rosa dos Santos (Portugal)

Fortuna Sittard won 3–0 on aggregate.

3 October 1984

ÍBV (Iceland)	1–3	(Poland) Wisła Kraków
Georgsson 86'	Report	Iwan 26', 31'; Banaszkiewicz 75'

Hásteinsvöllur, Vestmannaeyjar
Attendance: 500
Referee: George Smith (Scotland)

Wisła Kraków won 7–3 on aggregate.

3 October 1984

Dynamo Dresden (East Germany)	4–1	(Sweden) Malmö FF
Häfner 13' (pen.); Minge 29'; Stübner 52'; Pilz 63'	Report	Rönnberg 82' (pen.)

Dynamo-Stadion, Dresden
Attendance: 36,000
Referee: Ulrich Nyffenegger (Switzerland)

Dynamo Dresden won 4–3 on aggregate.

3 October 1984

Barcelona (Spain)	1–4	(France) Metz
Carrasco 33'	Report	Kurbos 38', 65', 85'; Sánchez 39' (o.g.)

Estadio del FC Barcelona, Barcelona
Attendance: 24,680
Referee: Ron Bridges (Wales)

Metz won 6–5 on aggregate.

3 October 1984

Beşiktaş (Turkey)	1–1	(Austria) Rapid Wien
Metin 61'	Report	Kranjčar 15'

İnönü Stadyumu, Istanbul
Attendance: 18,000
Referee: Ioan Igna (Romania)

Rapid Wien won 5–2 on aggregate.

3 October 1984

Celtic (Scotland)	3–0	(Belgium) Gent
McGarvey 41', 62'; P. McStay 89'	Report

Celtic Park, Glasgow
Attendance: 32,749
Referee: Egbert Mulder (Netherlands)

Celtic won 3–1 on aggregate.

3 October 1984

AEL (Greece)	2–0	(Hungary) Siófoki Bányász
Kmiecik 29'; Valaoras 66'	Report

Alkazar, Larissa
Attendance: 14,000
Referee: Ion Crăciunescu (Romania)

AELwon 3–1 on aggregate.

3 October 1984

Servette (Switzerland)	3–1	(Cyprus) APOEL
Kok 6'; Barberis 14'; Brigger 31'	Report	Moores 82'

Stade des Charmilles, Geneva
Attendance: 2,909
Referee: Paul Rion (Luxembourg)

Servette won 6–1 on aggregate.

3 October 1984

Hajduk Split (Socialist Federal Republic of Yugoslavia)	2–5	(Soviet Union) Dynamo Moscow
Deverić 40'; Vujović 50' (pen.)	Report	Gazzaev 7', 57', 77' (pen.); Bulanov 63'; Khapsalis 80'

Stadion Gradski vrt, Osijek
Attendance: 15,311
Referee: Bogdan Dochev (Bulgaria)

Dynamo Moscow won 6–2 on aggregate.

4 October 1984

Kuusysi (Finland)	0–0	(Czechoslovakia) Internacionál Slovnaft Bratislava
	Report

Lahden kisapuisto, Lahti
Attendance: 2,639
Referee: Thorbjørn Aas (Norway)

Internacionál Slovnaft Bratislava won 2–1 on aggregate.

== Second round ==
Team 1	Agg.	Team 2	1st leg	2nd leg
Bayern Munich (West Germany)	4–3	(Bulgaria) Trakia Plovdiv	4–1	0–2
Roma (Italy)	3–0	(Wales) Wrexham	2–0	1–0
Internacionál Slovnaft Bratislava (Czechoslovakia)	0–4	(England) Everton	0–1	0–3
Fortuna Sittard (Netherlands)	3–2	(Poland) Wisła Kraków	2–0	1–2
Dynamo Dresden (East Germany)	3–1	(France) Metz	3–1	0–0
Rapid Wien (Austria)	4–1	(Scotland) Celtic	3–1	1–0^{1}
AEL (Greece)	3–1	(Switzerland) Servette	2–1	1–0
Dynamo Moscow (Soviet Union)	6–0	(Malta) Ħamrun Spartans	5–0	1–0

Notes

- Note 1: The 2nd leg in the Rapid Wien–Celtic tie was replayed at Old Trafford, Manchester, after a Rapid player Rudolf Weinhofer claimed to have been injured by an object thrown by a Celtic supporter. Celtic had won the original tie 3–0 with goals from McClair, MacLeod, and Burns in the 32nd, 45th, and 68th minutes respectively. (Report)

=== First leg ===
24 October 1984

Bayern Munich (West Germany)	4–1	(Bulgaria) Trakia Plovdiv
Mladenov 8' (o.g.); Wohlfarth 20', 76'; Rummenigge 71'	Report	Georgiev 40'

Olympiastadion, Munich
Attendance: 9,500
Referee: Henning Lund-Sørensen (Denmark)

24 October 1984

Roma (Italy)	2–0	(Wales) Wrexham
Pruzzo 37' (pen.); Toninho Cerezo 50'	Report

Stadio Olimpico, Rome
Attendance: 36,972
Referee: László Pádár (Hungary)

24 October 1984

Internacionál Slovnaft Bratislava (Czechoslovakia)	0–1	(England) Everton
	Report	Bracewell 6'

Štadión Pasienky, Bratislava
Attendance: 8,767
Referee: Jakob Baumann (Switzerland)

24 October 1984

Fortuna Sittard (Netherlands)	2–0	(Poland) Wisła Kraków
Hoyer 21' van Well 78'	Report

De Baandert, Sittard
Attendance: 12,282
Referee: Patrick Daly (Republic of Ireland)

24 October 1984

Dynamo Dresden (East Germany)	3–1	(France) Metz
Häfner 24' (pen.); Stübner 37'; Gütschow 51'	Report	Trautmann 9' (o.g.)

Dynamo-Stadion, Dresden
Attendance: 35,627
Referee: Neil Midgley (England)

24 October 1984

Rapid Wien (Austria)	3–1	(Scotland) Celtic
Pacult 53'; Lainer 66'; Krankl 87'	Report	McClair 56'

Gerhard-Hanappi-Stadion, Vienna
Attendance: 15,700
Referee: Yordan Zhezhov (Bulgaria)

24 October 1984

AEL (Greece)	2–1	(Switzerland) Servette
Patsiavouras 53'; Kmiecik 65' (pen.)	Report	Kok 13'

Alkazar, Larissa
Attendance: 11,620
Referee: Bogdan Dochev (Bulgaria)

24 October 1984

Dynamo Moscow (Soviet Union)	5–0	(Malta) Ħamrun Spartans
Gazzaev 6', 64'; Karatayev 43'; Khapsalis 52'; Bulanov 56'	Report

Stadion Dinamo, Moscow
Attendance: 7,300
Referee: Wiesław Karolak (Poland)

=== Second leg ===
7 November 1984

Trakia Plovdiv (Bulgaria)	2–0	(West Germany) Bayern Munich
Pashev 39'; Kostadinov 51' (pen.)	Report

Stadion Deveti Septemvri, Plovdiv
Attendance: 28,000
Referee: Paolo Casarin (Italy)

Bayern Munich won 4–3 on aggregate.

7 November 1984

Wrexham (Wales)	0–1	(Italy) Roma
	Report	Graziani 67'

Racecourse Ground, Wrexham
Attendance: 14,007
Referee: Ángel Franco Martínez (Spain)

Roma won 3–0 on aggregate.

7 November 1984

Everton (England)	3–0	(Czechoslovakia) Internacionál Slovnaft Bratislava
Sharp 12'; Sheedy 44'; Heath 63'	Report

Goodison Park, Liverpool
Attendance: 25,007
Referee: Egbert Mulder (Netherlands)

Everton won 4–0 on aggregate.

7 November 1984

Wisła Kraków (Poland)	2–1	(Netherlands) Fortuna Sittard
Iwan 6' (pen.); Wróbel 42'	Report	Hoyer 1'

Stadion Wisły, Kraków
Attendance: 8,000
Referee: Gerasimos Germanakos (Greece)

Fortuna Sittard won 3–2 on aggregate.

7 November 1984

Metz (France)	0–0	(East Germany) Dynamo Dresden
	Report

Stade Saint-Symphorien, Metz
Attendance: 19,928
Referee: Zoran Petrović (Yugoslavia)

Dynamo Dresden won 3–1 on aggregate.

7 November 1984

Servette (Switzerland)	0–1	(Greece) AEL
	Report	Valaoras 60'

Stade des Charmilles, Geneva
Attendance: 12,500
Referee: Vítor Fernandes (Portugal)

AEL won 3–1 on aggregate.

7 November 1984

Ħamrun Spartans (Malta)	0–1	(Soviet Union) Dynamo Moscow
	Report	Chesnokov 12'

Ta' Qali National Stadium, Ta' Qali
Attendance: 2,124
Referee: Helmut Kohl (Austria)

Dynamo Moscow won 6–0 on aggregate.

7 November 1984

Celtic (Scotland)	3–0	(Austria) Rapid Wien
McClair 32'; MacLeod 44'; Burns 68'	Report

Celtic Park, Glasgow
Attendance: 48,813
Referee: Kjell Johansson (Sweden)

The match was voided following a disciplinary investigation by UEFA and a series of appeals due to reported incidents during the contest. Over a month later, a replay was ordered at a neutral venue at least 300km away from Glasgow.

12 December 1984

Celtic (Scotland)	0–1	(Austria) Rapid Wien
	Report	Pacult 18'

Old Trafford, Manchester
Attendance: 51,550
Referee: Luigi Agnolin (Italy)

Rapid Wien won 4–1 on aggregate.

== Quarter-finals ==
Team 1	Agg.	Team 2	1st leg	2nd leg
Bayern Munich (West Germany)	4–1	(Italy) Roma	2–0	2–1
Everton (England)	5–0	(Netherlands) Fortuna Sittard	3–0	2–0
Dynamo Dresden (East Germany)	3–5	(Austria) Rapid Wien	3–0	0–5
AEL (Greece)	0–1	(Soviet Union) Dynamo Moscow	0–0	0–1

=== First leg ===
6 March 1985

Bayern Munich (West Germany)	2–0	(Italy) Roma
Augenthaler 44'; Hoeneß 77'	Report

Olympiastadion, Munich
Attendance: 60,000
Referee: George Courtney (England)

6 March 1985

Everton (England)	3–0	(Netherlands) Fortuna Sittard
Gray 48', 74', 75'	Report

Goodison Park, Liverpool
Attendance: 25,782
Referee: Edvard Šoštarič (Yugoslavia)

6 March 1985

Dynamo Dresden (East Germany)	3–0	(Austria) Rapid Wien
Trautmann 47'; Minge 57'; Kirsten 82'	Report

Dynamo-Stadion, Dresden
Attendance: 36,000
Referee: Ron Bridges (Wales)

6 March 1985

AEL (Greece)	0–0	(Soviet Union) Dynamo Moscow
	Report

Alkazar, Larissa
Attendance: 17,000
Referee: Lajos Németh (Hungary)

=== Second leg ===
20 March 1985

Roma (Italy)	1–2	(West Germany) Bayern Munich
Nela 79'	Report	Matthäus 32' (pen.); Kögl 80'

Stadio Olimpico, Rome
Attendance: 56,084
Referee: Vojtech Christov (Czechoslovakia)

Bayern Munich won 4–1 on aggregate.

20 March 1985

Fortuna Sittard (Netherlands)	0–2	(England) Everton
	Report	Sharp 15'; Reid 76'

De Baandert, Sittard
Attendance: 16,425
Referee: Franz Wöhrer (Austria)

Everton won 5–0 on aggregate.

20 March 1985

Rapid Wien (Austria)	5–0	(East Germany) Dynamo Dresden
Pacult 4', 37'; Lainer 17'; Panenka 70' (pen.); Krankl 77'	Report

Gerhard-Hanappi-Stadion, Vienna
Attendance: 13,721
Referee: Alain Delmer (France)

Rapid Wien won 5–3 on aggregate.

20 March 1985

Dynamo Moscow (Soviet Union)	1–0	(Greece) AEL
Fomichyov 60'	Report

Stadion Dinamo, Tbilisi
Attendance: 16,200
Referee: Bob Valentine (Scotland)

Dynamo Moscow won 1–0 on aggregate.

== Semi-finals ==
Team 1	Agg.	Team 2	1st leg	2nd leg
Bayern Munich (West Germany)	1–3	(England) Everton	0–0	1–3
Rapid Wien (Austria)	4–2	(Soviet Union) Dynamo Moscow	3–1	1–1

=== First leg ===
10 April 1985

Bayern Munich (West Germany)	0–0	(England) Everton
	Report

Olympiastadion, Munich
Attendance: 66,000
Referee: Paolo Bergamo (Italy)

10 April 1985

Rapid Wien (Austria)	3–1	(Soviet Union) Dynamo Moscow
Lainer 68'; Krankl 70' (pen.); Hrstic 72'	Report	Karatayev 26' (pen.)

Gerhard-Hanappi-Stadion, Vienna
Attendance: 20,800
Referee: Vojtech Christov (Czechoslovakia)

=== Second leg ===
24 April 1985

Everton (England)	3–1	(West Germany) Bayern Munich
Sharp 48'; Gray 73'; Steven 86'	Report	Hoeneß 38'

Goodison Park, Liverpool
Attendance: 49,476
Referee: Erik Fredriksson (Sweden)

Everton won 3–1 on aggregate.

24 April 1985

Dynamo Moscow (Soviet Union)	1–1	(Austria) Rapid Wien
Pozdnyakov 29'	Report	Panenka 4'

Stadion Dinamo, Moscow
Attendance: 50,400
Referee: Marcel Van Langenhove (Belgium)

Rapid Wien won 4–2 on aggregate.

== Final ==
15 May 1985

Everton (England)	3–1	(Austria) Rapid Wien
Gray 57'; Steven 72'; Sheedy 86'	Report	Krankl 85'

De Kuip, Rotterdam
Attendance: 38,500
Referee: Paolo Casarin (Italy)

== Top scorers ==
The top scorers from the 1984–85 UEFA Cup Winners' Cup are as follows:

Rank	Name	Team	Goals
1	(Soviet Union) Valery Gazzaev	(Soviet Union) Dynamo Moscow	5
1	(Scotland) Andy Gray	(England) Everton	5
1	(Czechoslovakia) Antonín Panenka	(Austria) Rapid Wien	5
4	(Austria) Hans Krankl	(Austria) Rapid Wien	4
4	(West Germany) Tony Kurbos	(France) Metz	4
4	(Austria) Peter Pacult	(Austria) Rapid Wien	4
4	(Scotland) Graeme Sharp	(England) Everton	4
4	(West Germany) Roland Wohlfarth	(West Germany) Bayern Munich	4
9	(Poland) Marek Banaszkiewicz	(Poland) Wisła Kraków	3
9	(Netherlands) Arthur Hoyer	(Netherlands) Fortuna Sittard	3
9	(Poland) Andrzej Iwan	(Poland) Wisła Kraków	3
9	(Austria) Leo Lainer	(Austria) Rapid Wien	3
9	(Malta) Raymond Xuereb	(Malta) Ħamrun Spartans	3

== See also ==
- 1984–85 European Cup
- 1984–85 UEFA Cup
