= Anderlecht-Nottingham Forest bribery case =

The Nottingham Forest affair was a Belgian football scandal surrounding the match between RSC Anderlecht and Nottingham Forest on 25 April 1984, played in the semi-finals of the UEFA Cup. Anderlecht had lost the first leg 2–0, but managed to qualify for the final following a controversial 3–0 home victory in the return leg. The referee Emilio Guruceta awarded Anderlecht a highly disputed penalty and disallowed a late Nottingham Forest goal for unclear reasons, which would have won Notthingham Forest the tie.

== Confession ==
Everything came to light after Anderlecht chairman Roger Vanden Stock—son of Constant and his successor from 1996—refused to continue paying hush money, partly under pressure from main sponsor Generale Bank, unlike his father. Constant Vanden Stock made his confession after it leaked that he had been blackmailed for years by criminal associates Jean Elst and René Van Aeken.

In an interview with the newspaper Het Laatste Nieuws in early September 1997 from his residence in Cannes, former Anderlecht chairman Constant Vanden Stock admitted that following the match between Anderlecht and Nottingham Forest on 25 April 1984, he had granted a "loan" of one million old Belgian francs to Spanish referee Emilio Guruceta Muro because "Muro had run into financial difficulties with his business." The sum was transferred the day after the match to the Spanish official via Raymond De Deken, an Anderlecht referee liaison officer and middleman in the affair.

Jean Elst and Raymond De Deken knew each other well from a pub in Antwerp where they regularly played cards. Elst caught wind of the transaction and began blackmailing Vanden Stock, later joined by his accomplice René Van Aeken. Elst and Van Aeken threatened to release compromising documents and audio cassette recordings of conversations featuring Vanden Stock and his right-hand man Michel Verschueren, among others, to the media and football governing bodies. The Spanish referee Guruceta Muro was never able to reveal the true circumstances of the events, having been killed in a traffic accident at the age of 45.

== Acquittal and Legal Aftermath ==
On 22 September 1997, the UEFA Executive Committee decided in Helsinki that, despite the formal statute of limitations having expired, Anderlecht should be sanctioned on principled "ethical and moral grounds" and due to "unforeseen circumstances" (Article 28 of the regulations), banning the club from European competition for one year. Raymond De Deken, Anderlecht's referee liaison and the intermediary in the affair, received a lifetime ban. The Brussels club appealed the ruling to the Court of Arbitration for Sport (CAS) in Lausanne. On 8 May 1998, CAS overturned UEFA's sanction due to procedural errors. CAS ruled that a disciplinary sanction could only be handed down by the disciplinary body rather than the Executive Committee. Furthermore, UEFA had failed to respect its own ten-year statute of limitations.

In 1998, both Nottingham Forest and fifteen of the club's players filed a joint civil lawsuit for damages at the tribunal of first instance in Brussels, citing substantial financial losses from gate receipts and television broadcast rights, as well as the sporting injustice of being denied a place in the final. After a protracted legal battle lasting nearly a decade, both the club and the players decided to drop the claim in 2007.

In September 1998, the correctional tribunal of Brussels sentenced René Van Aeken and Jean Elst to two years' imprisonment and a fine of 100,000 francs for extortion and attempted extortion of RSC Anderlecht between 1985 and 1986. Both appealed the verdict. In October 2001, the Brussels court of appeal acquitted René Van Aeken on grounds of insufficient evidence. Proceedings against Jean Elst, who had died in prison in the interim, were declared extinguished.

== Cover-up ==
According to a BBC Inside Out report broadcast on 25 September 2016, UEFA had already been informed of the match-fixing scandal in 1992—four years prior to issuing its sanction. Following three unsuccessful attempts by Van Aeken (in 1989, 1990, and 1992) to have the incriminating documents investigated by the Royal Belgian Football Association and UEFA, RBFA President Michel D'Hooghe finally referred Van Aeken to the association's then Secretary-General Alain Courtois on 27 November 1992. When it emerged that Courtois had sent the sensitive dossier to UEFA via standard regular post rather than registered mail, and the bundle of documents subsequently went missing, Courtois was accused of gross negligence and, by some, even complicity. In the end, it was not until 1997, following Constant Vanden Stock's public confession, that the RBFA's new Secretary-General Jan Peeters forwarded the case file to the European football governing body.

== Literature ==
- Van Laeken, Frank (1997). Blunderboek van het Belgisch Voetbal – Inclusief 'De Anderlechtmemoires van Jean Elst' [Blunder Book of Belgian Football – Including 'The Anderlecht Memoirs of Jean Elst'] (in Dutch) (1st ed.). Antwerp: Icarus/Standaard Uitgeverij. p. 279. ISBN 9002206429

== See also ==
- Match fixing
