= 1982–83 Czechoslovak First League =

Czechoslovak First League
- Season: 1982–83
- Champions: Bohemians Prague
- Relegated: Zbrojovka Brno; Sigma Olomouc
- European Cup: Bohemians Prague
- Cup Winners' Cup: Dukla Prague
- UEFA Cup: Baník Ostrava; Sparta Prague; Inter Bratislava
- Top goalscorer: Pavel Chaloupka (17 goals)

Statistics of Czechoslovak First League in the 1982–83 season.

== Overview ==
It was contested by 16 teams, and Bohemians Prague won the championship. Pavel Chaloupka was the league's top scorer with 17 goals.

== Stadia and locations ==
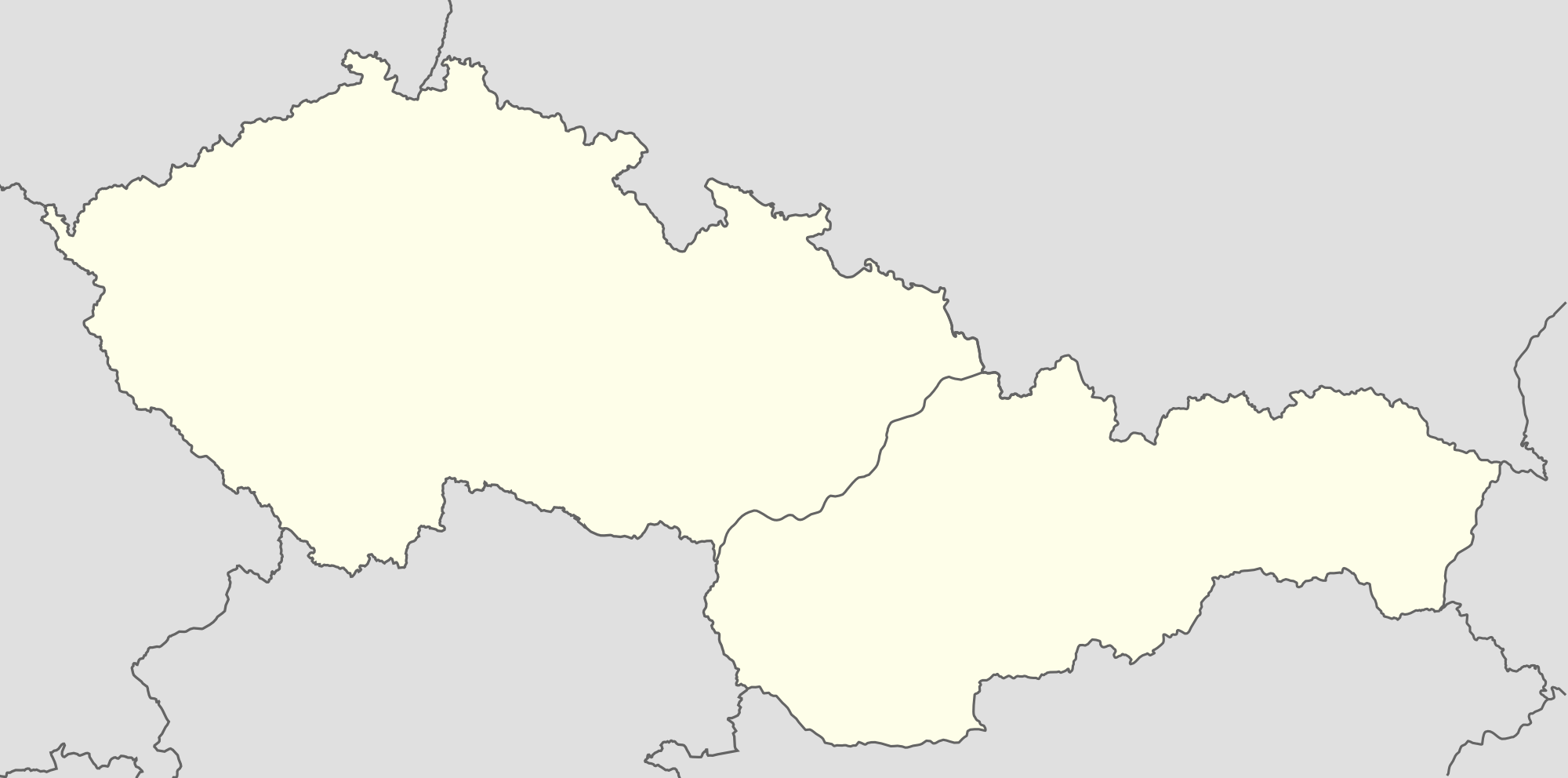
Location of clubs in the 1982–83 Czechoslovak First League

== League standings ==
| Pos | Team | Pld | W | D | L | GF | GA | GD | Pts | Qualification or relegation |
|---|---|---|---|---|---|---|---|---|---|---|
| 1 | Bohemians Prague (C) | 30 | 18 | 6 | 6 | 69 | 31 | +38 | 42 | Qualification for European Cup first round |
| 2 | Baník Ostrava | 30 | 16 | 8 | 6 | 48 | 31 | +17 | 40 | Qualification for UEFA Cup first round |
| 3 | Sparta Prague | 30 | 14 | 8 | 8 | 50 | 35 | +15 | 36 | Qualification for UEFA Cup first round |
| 4 | Inter Bratislava | 30 | 11 | 11 | 8 | 35 | 24 | +11 | 33 | Qualification for UEFA Cup first round |
| 5 | Dukla Prague | 30 | 11 | 10 | 9 | 44 | 35 | +9 | 32 | Qualification for Cup Winners' Cup first round |
| 6 | Slavia Prague | 30 | 12 | 8 | 10 | 56 | 53 | +3 | 32 | |
| 7 | Vítkovice | 30 | 13 | 5 | 12 | 40 | 39 | +1 | 31 | |
| 8 | Spartak Trnava | 30 | 12 | 6 | 12 | 29 | 39 | −10 | 30 | |
| 9 | RH Cheb | 30 | 9 | 11 | 10 | 44 | 38 | +6 | 29 | |
| 10 | Lokomotíva Košice | 30 | 11 | 7 | 12 | 41 | 50 | −9 | 29 | |
| 11 | ZVL Žilina | 30 | 11 | 6 | 13 | 41 | 43 | −2 | 28 | |
| 12 | Tatran Prešov | 30 | 10 | 7 | 13 | 43 | 53 | −10 | 27 | |
| 13 | Slovan Bratislava | 30 | 8 | 10 | 12 | 34 | 51 | −17 | 26 | |
| 14 | Plastika Nitra | 30 | 10 | 6 | 14 | 41 | 60 | −19 | 26 | |
| 15 | Zbrojovka Brno (R) | 30 | 8 | 7 | 15 | 43 | 52 | −9 | 23 | Relegation to Czech National Football League |
| 16 | Sigma Olomouc (R) | 30 | 5 | 6 | 19 | 32 | 56 | −24 | 16 | Relegation to Czech National Football League |

Source: rsssf.com
(C) Champions; (R) Relegated

== Results ==
| Home \ Away | OST | BOH | DUK | INT | LOK | NIT | CHE | OLO | SLA | SLO | SPA | TRN | PRE | VÍT | BRN | ŽIL |
|---|---|---|---|---|---|---|---|---|---|---|---|---|---|---|---|---|
| Baník Ostrava | | 2–1 | 0–0 | 2–0 | 3–0 | 4–0 | 2–0 | 2–0 | 3–1 | 2–1 | 3–2 | 4–1 | 1–1 | 2–1 | 1–0 | 4–2 |
| Bohemians Prague | 4–1 | | 6–1 | 1–0 | 4–0 | 5–1 | 2–0 | 4–0 | 2–1 | 3–0 | 0–2 | 1–1 | 2–0 | 3–1 | 4–1 | 4–1 |
| Dukla Prague | 0–0 | 3–4 | | 1–1 | 3–0 | 4–1 | 0–2 | 1–0 | 1–2 | 7–1 | 1–0 | 1–1 | 3–0 | 1–0 | 1–2 | 4–1 |
| Inter Bratislava | 1–0 | 0–0 | 0–0 | | 3–1 | 1–1 | 0–0 | 2–0 | 4–0 | 1–1 | 1–1 | 1–0 | 3–0 | 3–0 | 3–0 | 2–1 |
| Lokomotiva Košice | 1–1 | 1–2 | 3–1 | 0–0 | | 1–0 | 1–1 | 3–2 | 4–3 | 3–2 | 1–1 | 1–0 | 4–1 | 2–0 | 3–2 | 0–0 |
| Plastika Nitra | 1–2 | 3–3 | 2–0 | 1–0 | 1–2 | | 0–0 | 3–2 | 2–0 | 2–2 | 3–0 | 1–3 | 3–2 | 2–1 | 1–0 | 1–2 |
| RH Cheb | 0–2 | 1–1 | 3–1 | 0–1 | 2–0 | 7–2 | | 0–0 | 2–2 | 2–0 | 0–4 | 2–0 | 4–1 | 1–1 | 4–0 | 4–1 |
| Sigma Olomouc | 2–1 | 0–2 | 0–1 | 1–3 | 2–1 | 1–1 | 2–2 | | 1–1 | 0–3 | 2–3 | 3–0 | 4–1 | 1–2 | 1–1 | 1–0 |
| Slavia Prague | 3–1 | 2–2 | 0–0 | 0–0 | 3–1 | 6–1 | 4–1 | 4–2 | | 2–0 | 1–2 | 2–1 | 4–2 | 3–0 | 3–2 | 1–2 |
| Slovan Bratislava | 0–0 | 0–3 | 1–1 | 3–0 | 1–0 | 2–1 | 2–2 | 3–2 | 1–1 | | 0–1 | 2–0 | 2–1 | 1–1 | 2–2 | 2–1 |
| Sparta Prague | 0–0 | 1–2 | 3–2 | 3–1 | 4–0 | 1–1 | 1–1 | 1–1 | 3–3 | 3–0 | | 0–1 | 3–1 | 2–0 | 3–2 | 1–0 |
| Spartak Trnava | 3–1 | 1–0 | 1–1 | 1–1 | 1–1 | 0–1 | 1–0 | 2–0 | 0–0 | 1–0 | 1–0 | | 2–0 | 2–0 | 1–0 | 1–0 |
| Tatran Prešov | 2–2 | 2–2 | 1–1 | 1–0 | 2–1 | 2–1 | 3–1 | 2–0 | 5–0 | 0–0 | 1–1 | 5–1 | | 2–0 | 0–0 | 2–0 |
| Vítkovice | 0–1 | 1–0 | 0–0 | 1–0 | 0–3 | 2–0 | 2–1 | 3–2 | 5–2 | 5–0 | 3–2 | 3–0 | 3–0 | | 3–2 | 1–0 |
| Zbrojovka Brno | 3–0 | 2–1 | 0–3 | 2–2 | 3–1 | 2–3 | 1–1 | 2–0 | 3–0 | 3–1 | 0–2 | 4–1 | 1–3 | 0–0 | | 2–2 |
| ZVL Žilina | 1–1 | 2–1 | 0–1 | 2–1 | 2–2 | 3–1 | 1–0 | 2–0 | 0–2 | 1–1 | 3–0 | 4–1 | 4–0 | 1–1 | 2–1 | |

Source: statistiky1ligy.fotbal.cz
Legend: Blue = home team win; Yellow = draw; Red = away team win.

== Attendances ==
| # | Club | Average | Highest |
|---|---|---|---|
| 1 | Sparta Praha | 10,628 | 26,227 |
| 2 | Bohemians | 9,790 | 16,530 |
| 3 | Sigma Olomouc | 8,162 | 13,967 |
| 4 | Brno | 7,756 | 12,864 |
| 5 | Slavia Praha | 6,957 | 20,085 |
| 6 | Ostrava | 6,772 | 10,171 |
| 7 | Žilina | 5,386 | 9,481 |
| 8 | Vítkovice | 5,126 | 15,546 |
| 9 | Cheb | 4,665 | 7,892 |
| 10 | Košice | 4,297 | 6,869 |
| 11 | Spartak Trnava | 3,850 | 7,052 |
| 12 | Slovan | 3,756 | 9,804 |
| 13 | Nitra | 3,367 | 5,137 |
| 14 | Dukla Praha | 3,044 | 11,519 |
| 15 | Tatran Prešov | 2,923 | 5,021 |
| 16 | Inter Bratislava | 2,320 | 6,878 |
