= Walter De Greef =

Belgian footballer

Personal information
- Date of birth: 12 November 1957 (age 68)
- Place of birth: Paal, Belgium
- Position: Midfielder

Senior career*
Years	Team	Apps	(Gls)
1975–1981	Beringen		
1981–1986	Anderlecht		
1986–1987	Wiener SC		
1987–1988	Lokeren	4	(0)
1988–1989	Patro Eisden		

International career
1984	Belgium	5	(0)
- * Club domestic league appearances and goals

Walter De Greef (born 12 November 1957) is a retired Belgian footballer.

== Club career ==
During his career, the white-haired De Greef played for R.S.C. Anderlecht and Sporting Lokeren.

== International career ==
He earned 5 caps for the Belgium national football team, and participated in UEFA Euro 1984.

== Honours ==
=== Player ===
Anderlecht

- Belgian First Division: 1984–85, 1985–86
- Belgian Super Cup: 1985
- UEFA Cup: 1982–83 (winners), 1983–84 (runners-up)
- Jules Pappaert Cup: 1983, 1985
- Bruges Matins: 1985
