= Gavin Maguire =

English-born Welsh footballer

Personal information
- Full name: Gavin Terence Maguire
- Date of birth: 24 November 1967 (age 58)
- Place of birth: Hammersmith, England
- Position: Defender

Senior career*
| Years | Team | Apps | (Gls) |
| 1983–1984 | Northwood | 2 | (0) |
| 1984–1989 | Queens Park Rangers | 40 | (0) |
| 1989–1993 | Portsmouth | 91 | (0) |
| 1992 | → Newcastle United (loan) | 3 | (0) |
| 1993–1994 | Millwall | 12 | (0) |
| 1994 | → Scarborough (loan) | 2 | (0) |
| 1997 | Northwood | 3 | (0) |
| Total | | 153 | (0) |

International career
| 1989–1991 | Wales | 7 | (0) |
- * Club domestic league appearances and goals

Gavin Terence Maguire (born 24 November 1967) is an English-born Welsh former professional footballer and Wales international.

== Club career ==
Maguire began his career as a forward with Northwood, moving to Defence when the club's regular centre back suffered a broken ankle. He signed for Queens Park Rangers, after being recommended to one of the club's scouts, and made his debut in a 1–0 win over Oxford United at the age of 18 in Division One. Maguire was taken to court later in his career for a tackle during his time with Queens Park Rangers which ultimately led to the retirement of Danny Thomas, resulting in an out-of-court settlement of £130,000.

He went on to make 40 league appearances at Loftus Road before moving to Portsmouth in January 1989 for a fee of £175,000. After several years at Fratton Park, Maguire suffered a serious knee injury and, after being unable to win his place back, he spent time on loan with Newcastle United before joining Millwall in March 1993. However, he struggled to return to full fitness and, after a short period on loan at Scarborough, retired from professional football at the age of 26 with a knee injury - just like Danny Thomas.

== International career ==
Born in England, Maguire was also eligible to represent both Wales and Republic of Ireland through his parents. He eventually decided to play for Wales, making his international debut on 6 September 1989 in a 1–0 defeat to Finland as a substitute in place of Peter Nicholas. He played in Wales' next four matches before winning his final two caps fifteen months later, making his last appearance on 16 October 1991 in a 4–1 defeat to Germany.

== After football ==
Following his retirement, Maguire travelled the United States for over a year before returning to England where he worked as a personal trainer for two years. After a friend suggested moving into hairdressing, he undertook a nine-month course and now runs his own hairdressing business in Somerset.
