= Michel Verschueren =

Belgian businessman and sporting director (1931–2022)

- Verschueren in the Anderlecht stadium in 2013

Personal information
- Full name: Michel Verschueren
- Date of birth: 17 March 1931
- Place of birth: Boortmeerbeek, Belgium
- Date of death: 14 September 2022 (aged 91)
- Place of death: Meise, Belgium

Managerial career
- Years: Team
- 1956–1958: Racing Boortmeerbeek
- 1958–1963: Eendracht Aalst (physical trainer)
- 1963–1969: Anderlecht (physical trainer)
- 1969–1973: Daring Brussel (manager)
- 1973–1980: R.W.D.M. (manager)
- 1980–2003: Anderlecht (manager)
- 2004–2016: Anderlecht (board)

Michel Verschueren (17 March 1931 – 14 September 2022) was a Belgian businessman and sporting director.

A former footballer, Verschueren was manager and trainer for multiple clubs, notably serving as manager for R.S.C. Anderlecht from 1981 to 2003. He was known by the nicknames "Mister Michel" and "The Silver Fox" and stood out on occasion for his controversial opinions.

Verschueren died in Meise on 14 September 2022, at the age of 91.

== Early years ==
Michel Verschueren was born on 17 March 1931 in Boortmeerbeek. As a youth, Verschueren was active in sports and pursued physical fitness. For his student days, the gymnast went to KU Leuven, where he obtained a degree in physical education. His career in football began at Flemish Brabant's KRC Boortmeerbeek, where he was first a player and later became a coach for two seasons. In 1958, he made the move to Eendracht Aalst where he started as physical trainer. In that role, he introduced the academic approach to fitness training into Belgian professional football. His work as a physical coach led him to join RSC Anderlecht, where he worked with coaches Pierre Sinibaldi, András Béres and Norberto Höfling in that role. After six seasons at the very highest level, he followed the latter to Brussels neighbours Daring Molenbeek.

== Managerial career ==
Under the impuls of Constant Vanden Stock, Verschueren returned to Anderlecht in 1980. This marked the beginning of a successful 25-year period for the club, during which, under his reign as manager, no fewer than 11 national titles, three Belgian Cups and, above all, the UEFA Cup of 1983 were added to the record of Anderlecht. Off the pitch, Verschueren contributed to the club's modernization and growth. His ideas contributed to the modernization of the Constant Vanden Stock stadium, including the introduction of business seats and private boxes, with which Anderlecht took a pioneering role in football.

Sports manager Verschueren realised some important transfers over the years, the most famous example being that of Juan Lozano. A deal that Mister Michel officialized just before the transfer deadline in an airport in the United States. The story of the contract on the beer mat was frequently recounted by Verschueren. The transfer of Marc Degryse from the Bruges rival to purple and white was nother example of Verschueren's approach to recruitment and business negotiations.

== Later life ==
In 2003, aged 72, Michel Verschueren was succeeded by Herman van Holsbeeck.

After his managerial career, Verschueren joined Anderlecht's board. He also became the manager of the Le Saint-Guidon restaurant. Michel Verschueren died on the night of 13-14 September 2022 at the age of 91 in a residential care home in Wolvertem, Meise.

== Honours ==
With Verschueren as manager, Anderlecht won the following trophies:

- Belgian First Division: 1980–81, 1984–85, 1985–86, 1986–87, 1990–91, 1992–93, 1993–94, 1994–95, 1999–2000, 2000–01, 2003–04
- Belgian Cup: 1988–89, 1989–90, 1993–94
- Belgian Supercup: 1985, 1987, 1993, 1995, 2000, 2001
- European Cup Winners' Cup: runners-up 1989–90
- UEFA Cup: 1982–83; runners-up 1983–84
- Jules Pappaert Cup: 1983, 1985, 2000, 2001
- Bruges Matins: 1985, 1988
