= Emilio Guruceta =

Spanish association football referee (1941–1987)

- Born: 4 November 1941; San Sebastián, Spain
- Died: 25 February 1987 (aged 45); Fraga, Spain

Emilio Guruceta Muro (Note: Contemporary Spanish sources record Guruceta with different given names. Coverage of his death in El País in 1987 included articles with the given names José Emilio, and Emilio Carlos.) (4 November 1941 – 25 February 1987) was a Spanish football referee. He is remembered with the Guruceta Trophy, awarded to the best referee of the season in Spain.

Guruceta died in a car crash, aged 45. After his death, it was revealed that he had been bribed by Belgian club Anderlecht to fix their UEFA Cup semi-final against Nottingham Forest in 1984.

== Career ==
=== 1970 El Clásico ===
Aged 28, Guruceta was chosen to referee the second leg of a Barcelona–Real Madrid El Clásico tie in the quarter-finals of the Copa del Generalísimo, with the fixture holding significant weight as both teams were no longer in the running to win La Liga. Real Madrid won the first leg 2–0 at home, and in the second leg at the Camp Nou, Barcelona were winning 1–0 through Carles Rexach.

Around the hour mark, Guruceta awarded Real Madrid a penalty kick for a foul by Joaquim Rifé on Manuel Velázquez. Footage is not conclusive on whether the event happened in the penalty area, or if it was a foul. After Real Madrid's equaliser, the Barcelona players walked off the pitch, but manager Vic Buckingham brought them back on in order to placate the crowd. With minutes of the game remaining, a pitch invasion led to Guruceta and his assistants being chased off the pitch and the game abandoned.

Barcelona fans and members allege that Guruceta fixed the result for Real Madrid. His Basque ethnicity is sometimes cited as evidence of a cover-up, as it would be considered unlikely for a person from the region to favour a club from Madrid. He was suspended for six games over this match, though this was for not controlling the game, rather than for corruption. In his book on Spanish football Morbo, British journalist Phil Ball says that it was more likely that Guruceta made a mistake under pressure. Guruceta aroused suspicion by buying a new BMW car and opening a sportswear business, though his actions were not unusual for someone from a middle-class background.

=== 1979 UEFA Cup controversy ===
On 24 October 1979, Standard Liège of Belgium hosted Napoli of Italy in the second round of the UEFA Cup. Belgian newspaper Le Soir wrote that Napoli had been "decimated by a sham of a referee" in that game, having two players sent off and four more suspended with a yellow card. UEFA backed the referee's decisions. Italian newspaper Il Messaggero alleged that the referee called Italians "just like the Spanish, all sons of bitches", an allegation he denied.

=== 1984 UEFA Cup semi-final fix ===
In the semi-finals of the 1983–84 UEFA Cup, Nottingham Forest of England led Anderlecht 2–0 ahead of the second leg in Belgium. Forest manager Brian Clough had not been supportive of Guruceta being assigned to the game, due to the Standard Liège and Napoli controversy in 1979.

Anderlecht advanced to the final with a 3–0 win. The Belgian club were awarded a penalty when Forest's Kenny Swain was not near the player who went down, while Paul Hart headed an aggregate equaliser in added time, which was disallowed.

In 1994, seven years after Guruceta's death, it was revealed that Anderlecht president Constant Vanden Stock had loaned him 1 million Belgian francs (£15,000), allegedly due to the referee's financial issues. The club employee who broke the story said he did so due to threats to his life, while the club said that the employee was blackmailing them. The employee had secretly recorded the club's discussion with Guruceta.

== Death ==
Guruceta died in a car crash on 25 February 1987, in Fraga, in the Province of Huesca. He was travelling to a Copa del Rey game between Osasuna and Real Madrid in Pamplona. One of his assistants, Eduardo Vidal, was also killed, while the other, Antonio Coves, was gravely injured.

In Morbo, Ball interviewed one of the linesmen from the 1970 Clásico. Under the influence of alcohol, the assistant said "Le jodieron, ¿sabes? Y no hizo nada" (They screwed him, y'know, and he didn't do anything). The author was unsure whether this was a comment on Guruceta's reputation, or an allegation of assassination.
