= Constant Vanden Stock =

Belgian footballer and president

- Constant Vanden Stock

Personal information
- Full name: Constant Vanden Stock
- Date of birth: 13 June 1914
- Place of birth: Anderlecht, Belgium
- Date of death: 19 April 2008 (aged 93)
- Place of death: Uccle, Belgium
- Position: Defender

Youth career
- 1924–1933: Anderlecht

Senior career*
Years	Team	Apps	(Gls)
1933–1938	Anderlecht	52	(0)
1938–1943	Union SG	87	(0)

Managerial career
- 1950–1953: Anderlecht (youth)
- 1953–1956: La Forestoise (president)
- 1956–1958: Belgium (selection committee)
- 1958–1968: Belgium (manager)
- 1968–1969: Club Brugge (technical director)
- 1969–1970: Anderlecht (board)
- 1970–1971: Anderlecht (vice-chairman)
- 1971–1996: Anderlecht (chairman)
- 1996–2008: Anderlecht (honorary chairman)
- * Club domestic league appearances and goals

Constant Vanden Stock (Flemish pronunciation: [kɔ̃ːˈstɑ̃ː vɑndə(n) ˈstɔk]; 13 June 1914 – 19 April 2008) was a Belgian football player, trainer, football manager and entrepreneur.

Vanden Stock was chairman of RSC Anderlecht from 1971 to 1996. Under his reign, Anderlecht won the national title ten times, the Belgian Cup seven times, the UEFA Cup Winners' Cup twice, the UEFA Cup once and the European Super Cup twice. Constant Vanden Stock was also one of the founders of the introduction of professional football in Belgium. In addition to football, he built the Belle-Vue brewery into a successful global brand. Vanden Stock managed the family brewery, famous for its Kriek and Lambic, until he sold it to beer giant Interbrew, now InBev.

== Early years and club career ==
Constant Vanden Stock was born in Anderlecht on 13 June 1914, just before the start of the First World War, as the son of beer brewer Philémon Vanden Stock (1886–1945) and his wife Marie. Ten years later he started playing football for RSC Anderlecht, where he played only 52 league matches in the first team between 1933 and 1938 due to several serious injuries. Afterwards he switched to the neighbors of Union Saint-Gilloise. Five years later he retired as a player and concentrated on expanding Belle-Vue, his father's brewery.

== Managerial career ==
In the early 1950s, Vanden Stock took up his first position at Anderlecht. He became responsible for the recruitment of youth for three years and also took charge of cadets and students. After a short stint as chairman of third division club La Forestoise, he was included in the selection committee of the RBFA, two years later he became the coach of the Belgium national football team from 1958 to 1968. Then Anderlecht chairman Albert Roosens wanted to bring him back to Anderlecht, but Vanden Stock preferred a role as technical director at Club Brugge. However, a year later, in 1969, he returned to the capital city of Brussels. Vanden Stock became a board member and vice-chairman of Anderlecht before taking full control as chairman in 1971.

== Presidential career ==
It became the start of a success story, because in the 25 years that Constant Vanden Stock was chairman of Anderlecht, the club managed to add many prizes to its list of achievements. He won the national title ten times, the Belgian Cup seven times, the European Cup Winners Cup twice, the UEFA Cup once and the European Super Cup twice. The successes in the eighties and nineties would be notably achieved with club manager Michel Verschueren. In addition, the then Émile Versé Stadium was converted between 1983 and 1991 into a new and modern football temple with boxes and business seats, which gave it a new name: the Constant Vanden Stock Stadium. Vanden Stock's legacy is somewhat tainted, however, by the fact he hired gangsters to bribe the referee Emilio Guruceta in their 1983–84 UEFA Cup semi-final against Nottingham Forest—Vanden Stock alleged he had lent the referee 1 million Belgian francs because of the referee's financial issues.

In 1996, Vanden Stock transferred the chairmanship to his son Roger, although the then 82-year-old Constant remained associated with the club as honorary chairman. In 2005, the former chairman's health began to deteriorate, resulting in balance disorders and a heart attack. Vanden Stock died on 19 April 2008 after a long illness, just before the centenary of RSC Anderlecht. Constant Vanden Stock was 93 years old.

== Honours ==
With Vanden Stock as president, Anderlecht won the following trophies:

- Belgian First Division: 1971–72, 1973–74, 1980–81, 1984–85, 1985–86, 1986–87, 1990–91, 1992–93, 1993–94, 1994–95
- Belgian Cup: 1971–72, 1972–73, 1974–75, 1975–76, 1988–89, 1989–90, 1993–94
- Belgian League Cup: 1973, 1974
- Belgian Supercup: 1985, 1987, 1993
- European Cup Winners' Cup: 1975–76, 1977–78; runners-up 1976–77, 1989–90
- European Super Cup: 1976, 1978
- UEFA Cup: 1982–83; runners-up 1983–84
- Amsterdam Tournament: 1976
- Tournoi de Paris: 1977
- Jules Pappaert Cup: 1977, 1983, 1985
- Belgian Sports Merit Award: 1978
- Bruges Matins: 1985, 1988
