= Danny Thomas (footballer, born 1961) =

English footballer

Daniel Thomas
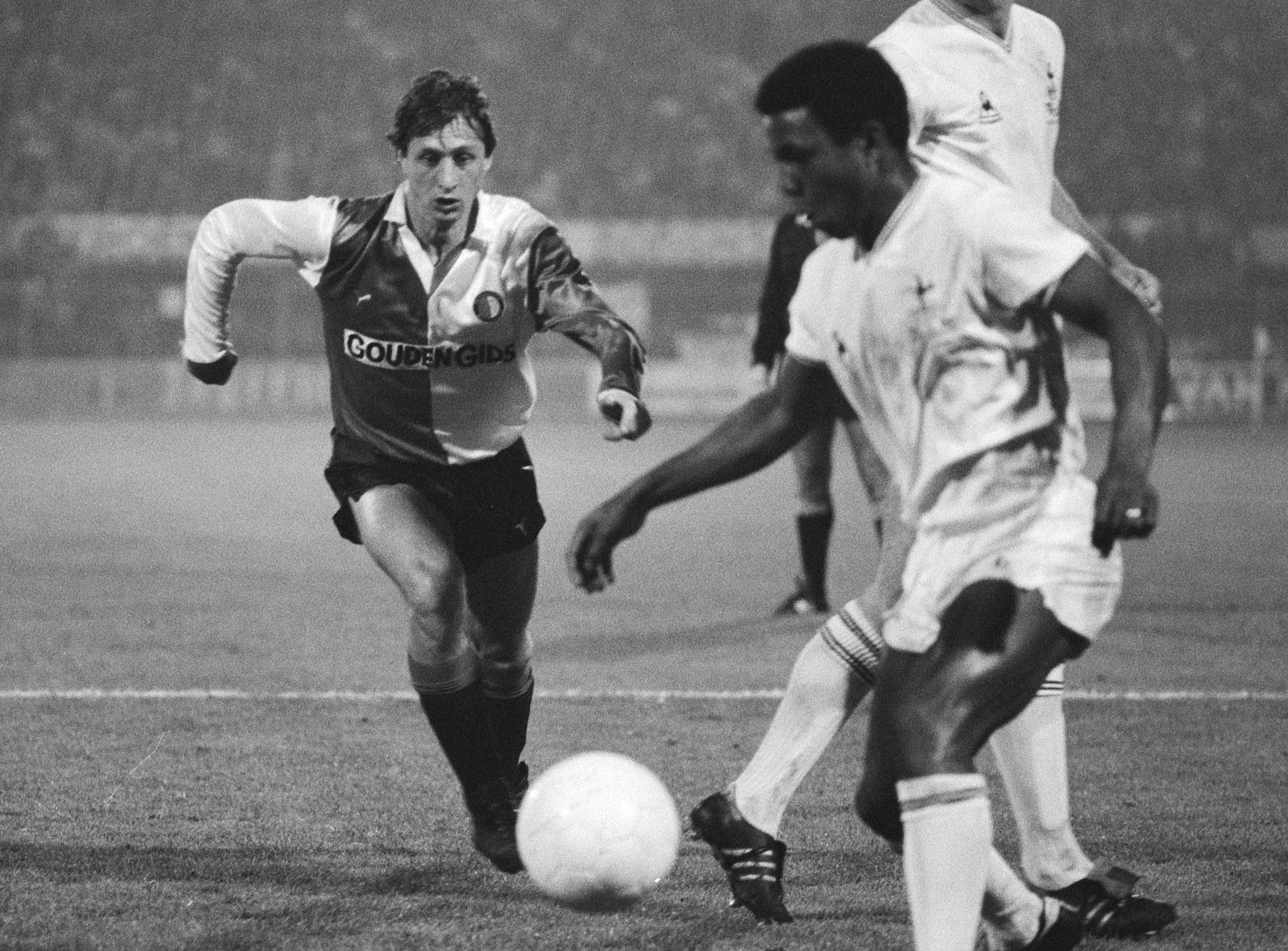
- Thomas (right) and Johan Cruyff, Feyenoord vs Tottenham during the 1983–84 UEFA Cup competition

Personal information
- Full name: Daniel Joseph Thomas
- Date of birth: 12 November 1961 (age 64)
- Place of birth: Worksop, England
- Height: 5 ft 7 in (1.70 m)

Senior career*
Years	Team	Apps	(Gls)
1979–1983	Coventry City	98	(4)
1983–1988	Tottenham Hotspur	87	(1)
Total		185	(5)

International career
1977	England Schoolboys	9	(3)
1981–1984	England U21	7	(0)
1983	England	2	(0)
- * Club domestic league appearances and goals

Daniel Joseph Thomas (born 12 November 1961) is an English former professional footballer who played for Coventry City and Tottenham Hotspur and for the England national team. He was a member of the Tottenham Hotspur team that won the 1983–84 UEFA Cup, despite missing his penalty in the shootout in the final against Anderlecht.

== Club career ==
Thomas made his debut for Coventry City during the 1979–80 season, making 3 appearances during that season. Over the next three seasons he was a regular for the first team. In June 1983 he was transferred to Tottenham Hotspur for a fee of £250,000. He made his Tottenham league debut on 27 August 1983 in a 3–1 defeat at Ipswich Town. He collected a UEFA Cup winner's medal at the end of the 1983–84 season and made a total of 87 league appearances for the White Hart Lane club, scoring once, before suffering a knee injury in 1987 following a tackle by Gavin Maguire He retired the following year, having failed to recover from the injury.

=== Appearances ===
Coventry City:

- 1979–1980 Played 3 Scored 0 goals (Division 1)
- 1980–1981 Played 25 Scored 1 goal (Division 1)
- 1981–1982 Played 39 Scored 1 goal (Division 1)
- 1982–1983 Played 41 Scored 3 goals (Division 1)

Tottenham:

- 1983–1984 Played 27 Scored 0 goals (Division 1)
- 1984–1985 Played 16 Scored 0 goals (Division 1)
- 1985–1986 Played 27 Scored 1 goal (Division 1)
- 1986–1987 Played 17 Scored 0 goals (Division 1)
- 1987–1988 Played 0 Scored 0 goals (Division 1)

== International career ==
He was capped twice by England during the tour of Australia in June 1983, playing 137 minutes for the national side.

Thomas, along with Charlie Cresswell and Harvey Elliott, shares the honour of winning the UEFA Under-21 European Championship twice.

== Career after football ==
He completed a degree in physiotherapy after his career came to an end at the age of 26 after a serious injury. With the assistance of the Professional Footballers' Association he completed a master's degree. After a short period as physio with West Bromwich Albion he went on to run his own practice in Coventry before working in Florida.

== Honours ==
Tottenham Hotspur

- UEFA Cup winner: 1984

.England Under 21

UEFA Under 21 European Championship. 1982,1984

Individual

- Coventry City Hall of Fame
