= Pavel Chaloupka =

Czech footballer (1959–2025)

Personal information
- Date of birth: 4 May 1959
- Place of birth: Most, Czechoslovakia
- Date of death: 23 May 2025 (aged 66)
- Place of death: Chomutov, Czech Republic
- Height: 1.79 m (5 ft 10 in)
- Position: Midfielder

Youth career
- CHZ Litvínov

Senior career*
Years	Team	Apps	(Gls)
1976–1978	Sklo Union Teplice		
1978–1980	FVTJ Tábor		
1980	Dukla Prague		
1980–1988	Bohemians Praha	317	(77)
1988–1990	Fortuna Düsseldorf	37	(9)
1990–1991	FC Berlin	11	(0)

International career
1981–1987	Czechoslovakia	20	(2)
- * Club domestic league appearances and goals

Pavel Chaloupka (4 May 1959 – 23 May 2025) was a Czech professional footballer who played as a midfielder.

Chaloupka played for several clubs, including Dukla Prague (1980), Bohemians Praha (1980–1989) and Fortuna Düsseldorf (1989–1990). He earned twenty matches and two goals whilst playing for the Czechoslovakia national team, and participated at the 1982 FIFA World Cup.

Chaloupka died on 23 May 2025, at the age of 66.
