= Ronald Lengkeek =

Dutch footballer

Personal information
- Date of birth: 14 September 1960 (age 66)
- Place of birth: Rotterdam, Netherlands
- Position: Striker

Youth career
- Sparta Rotterdam

Senior career*
Years	Team	Apps	(Gls)
1979–1988	Sparta Rotterdam	250	(86)
- * Club domestic league appearances and goals

Ronald Lengkeek (born 14 September 1960) is a Dutch former footballer who played all of his career for Sparta Rotterdam.

He also had one appearance for the Netherlands Under-21 team.

He played mostly as a striker but could also play right-wing and attacking midfield.

== Club career ==
Lengkeek came through the youth ranks of Sparta to become their senior team's all-time top goalscorer since the start of the Eredivisie.

He played European Cup matches with Sparta, 10 games in total (3 goals).
