= 1984 UEFA Cup final =

- Both matchday programmes
- Event: 1983–84 UEFA Cup
Anderlecht	Tottenham Hotspur
(Belgium)	(England)
2	2
- on aggregate Tottenham Hotspur won 4–3 on penalties

First leg
Anderlecht	Tottenham Hotspur
1	1
- Date: 9 May 1984
- Venue: Constant Vanden Stock Stadium, Brussels
- Referee: Bruno Galler (Switzerland)
- Attendance: 38,000

Second leg
Tottenham Hotspur	Anderlecht
1	1
- After extra time
- Date: 23 May 1984
- Venue: White Hart Lane, London
- Referee: Volker Roth (West Germany)
- Attendance: 46,258

The 1984 UEFA Cup final was an association football tie played on 9 May and 23 May 1984 to determine the champion of the 1983–84 UEFA Cup. The two-legged final was contested between Anderlecht of Belgium, who were title holders, and Tottenham Hotspur of England. Tottenham won 4–3 on penalty kicks after the tie finished 2–2 on aggregate.

In 1997, it emerged that Anderlecht's passage to the final had involved the club's chairman paying a bribe totalling £27,000 to the referee for the semi-final against Nottingham Forest. A dubious penalty was awarded to Anderlecht, whilst a Forest goal was disallowed.

In the second leg Graham Roberts captained the team in Steve Perryman's absence. Glenn Hoddle was not fit and did not play in any of the two legs.

It would take Tottenham 41 years to win their next European title, the 2024–25 UEFA Europa League.

== Route to the final ==
Anderlecht				Round	Tottenham Hotspur			
Opponent	Agg.	1st leg	2nd leg		Opponent	Agg.	1st leg	2nd leg
(Norway) Bryne	4–1	3–0 (A)	1–1 (H)	First round	(Republic of Ireland) Drogheda United	14–0	6–0 (A)	8–0 (H)
(Czechoslovakia) Baník Ostrava	4–2	2–0 (H)	2–2 (A)	Second round	(Netherlands) Feyenoord	6–2	4–2 (H)	2–0 (A)
(France) Lens	2–1	1–1 (A)	1–0 (H)	Third round	(West Germany) Bayern Munich	2–1	0–1 (A)	2–0 (H)
(Soviet Union) Spartak Moscow	4–3	4–2 (H)	0–1 (A)	Quarter-finals	Austria Wien	4–2	2–0 (H)	2–2 (A)
(England) Nottingham Forest	3–2	0–2 (A)	3–0 (H)	Semi-finals	(Socialist Federal Republic of Yugoslavia) Hajduk Split	2–2 (a)	1–2 (A)	1–0 (H)

== Match details ==
=== First leg ===
9 May 1984

Anderlecht (Belgium)	1–1	(England) Tottenham Hotspur
Olsen 85'	Report Overview (archive) Overview	Miller 57'

Constant Vanden Stock Stadium, Brussels
Attendance: 38,000
Referee: Bruno Galler (Switzerland)

Anderlecht	Tottenham Hotspur

GK	1	(Belgium) Jacky Munaron
RB	3	(Belgium) Georges Grün
CB	2	(Belgium) Walter De Greef
CB	10	(Denmark) Morten Olsen (c)
LB	5	(Belgium) Michel De Groote
RM	8	(Netherlands) Wim Hofkens
CM	6	(Belgium) Enzo Scifo
CM	7	(Belgium) René Vandereycken
LM	11	(Denmark) Kenneth Brylle
CF	9	(Belgium) Erwin Vandenbergh	(substituted off) 82'
CF	4	(Belgium) Alexandre Czerniatynski	(substituted off) 64'
Substitutes:
GK	12	(Belgium) Dirk Vekeman
MF	13	(Denmark) Per Frimann
FW	14	(Belgium) Franky Vercauteren	(substituted on) 64'
MF	15	(Iceland) Arnór Guðjohnsen
MF	16	(Denmark) Frank Arnesen	(substituted on) 82'
Manager:
(Belgium) Paul Van Himst

GK	1	(England) Tony Parks
RB	2	(England) Danny Thomas
CB	4	(England) Graham Roberts
CB	5	(England) Paul Miller
LB	3	(Republic of Ireland) Chris Hughton
RM	10	(England) Gary Stevens		(substituted off) 81'
CM	6	(England) Steve Perryman (c)	(yellow card) 67'
CM	7	(England) Micky Hazard
LM	11	(Republic of Ireland) Tony Galvin	(yellow card) 71'
CF	9	(England) Mark Falco
CF	8	(Scotland) Steve Archibald
Substitutes:
MF	12	(England) Gary Mabbutt		(substituted on) 81'
FW	14	(England) Garth Crooks
MF	15	(England) Richard Cooke
DF	16	(England) Ian Culverhouse
GK	17	(England) Ray Clemence
Manager:
(England) Keith Burkinshaw

=== Second leg ===
23 May 1984

Tottenham Hotspur (England)	1–1 (a.e.t.)	(Belgium) Anderlecht
Roberts 84'	Report Overview (archive) Overview	Czerniatynski 60'
Penalties
Roberts (penalty scored); Falco (penalty scored); Stevens (penalty scored); Archibald (penalty scored); Thomas (penalty missed)	4–3	(penalty missed) Olsen; (penalty scored) Brylle; (penalty scored) Scifo; (penalty scored) Vercauteren; (penalty missed) Guðjohnsen

White Hart Lane, London
Attendance: 46,258
Referee: Volker Roth (West Germany)

Tottenham Hotspur	Anderlecht

GK	1	(England) Tony Parks
RB	2	(England) Danny Thomas
CB	4	(England) Graham Roberts (c)
CB	5	(England) Paul Miller	(yellow card) 73'		(substituted off) 77'
LB	3	(Republic of Ireland) Chris Hughton
RM	10	(England) Gary Stevens	(yellow card) 57'
CM	6	(England) Gary Mabbutt		(substituted off) 73'
CM	7	(England) Micky Hazard
LM	11	(Republic of Ireland) Tony Galvin
CF	9	(England) Mark Falco	(yellow card) 70'
CF	8	(Scotland) Steve Archibald
Substitutes:
MF	12	(Argentina) Osvaldo Ardiles		(substituted on) 73'
FW	14	(England) Garth Crooks
DF	15	(Wales) Mark Bowen
MF	16	(Scotland) Ally Dick		(substituted on) 77'
GK	17	(England) Ray Clemence
Manager:
(England) Keith Burkinshaw

GK	1	(Belgium) Jacky Munaron
RB	2	(Belgium) Georges Grün
CB	3	(Belgium) Walter De Greef
CB	10	(Denmark) Morten Olsen
LB	5	(Belgium) Michel De Groote
RM	8	(Netherlands) Wim Hofkens
CM	9	(Belgium) Enzo Scifo
CM	7	(Belgium) René Vandereycken
LM	6	(Belgium) Franky Vercauteren (c)
CF	11	(Denmark) Frank Arnesen	(yellow card) 42'		(substituted off) 77'
CF	4	(Belgium) Alexandre Czerniatynski		(substituted off) 103'
Substitutes:
FW	14	(Denmark) Kenneth Brylle		(substituted on) 103'
FW	16	(Iceland) Arnór Guðjohnsen		(substituted on) 77'
Manager:
(Belgium) Paul Van Himst

== See also ==
- 1984 European Cup final
- 1984 European Cup Winners' Cup final
- R.S.C. Anderlecht in European football
- Tottenham Hotspur F.C. in European football
