= Samid Beganović =

Yugoslav and Serbian footballer

Sanid Beganović
Personal information
- Full name: Sanid Beganović
- Date of birth: 21 January 1960
- Place of birth: Priboj, FPR Yugoslavia
- Date of death: 11 March 2009 (aged 49)
- Place of death: Novi Sad, Serbia
- Height: 1.82 m (6 ft 0 in)
- Position: Winger

Senior career*
Years	Team	Apps	(Gls)
- FAP
1981–1985	Radnički Niš	118	(11)
1985–1988	Vojvodina	85	(10)
1988–1989	Le Mans	33	(11)
1989–1990	Créteil	28	(4)
1990–1991	Évry		
1991–1994	Lyon-Duchère		
Total		264	(36)
- * Club domestic league appearances and goals

Sanid Beganović (Serbian Cyrillic: Санид Бегановић; 21 January 1960 – 11 March 2009) was a Yugoslav and Serbian footballer who played as a winger.

== Career ==
Born in Priboj, Beganović made a name for himself at Radnički Niš, amassing 118 appearances and scoring 11 goals in the Yugoslav First League (1981–1985). He was also a regular member of the team that reached the semi-finals of the 1981–82 UEFA Cup. After spending three seasons with Vojvodina, Beganović moved abroad to France and joined Le Mans in the summer of 1988. He later also played for Créteil, Évry, and Lyon-Duchère.

== Death ==
On 11 March 2009, Beganović died due to heart attack during a court hearing in Novi Sad.
