= Howard King (referee) =

Welsh football referee

- Full name: Howard King
- Born: 1 September 1946 (age 80); Merthyr Tydfil, Wales

Domestic
Years	League	Role
1977-1980	Football League	Assistant referee
1980-1994	Football League	Referee
1992-1994	Premier League	Referee

International
Years	League	Role
1980-1991	FIFA listed	Referee

Howard King (born 1 September 1946) is a former football referee in the English Football League and Premier League. He also served on the Welsh FIFA List. He was based in Merthyr Tydfil which was also home to Leo Callaghan, one of only three Welsh referees to control the English FA Cup Final.

== Career ==
=== Domestic ===
King became a Football League linesman in 1977 and three years later was promoted to the referees List, aged thirty three. He featured quite frequently in the top division over the next few years and was selected as one of the first Premier League referees for 1992–93 while also continuing to referee Football League matches. His first ever match in the Premier League was the 2–1 home win by Coventry City over Middlesbrough at Highfield Road on 15 August 1992.

King served two years on the Premier List. In December 1993 he handled a fourth round replay in the English League Cup which saw Wimbledon (now MK Dons) beat Liverpool 4–3 on penalties after a 2–2 draw following extra time. This proved to be his final game. He was having injury problems, as he had at various points in his career, and as a result left the List at the end of season 1993–94, a year before he was due to reach retirement age.

=== International & Europe ===
Internationally, he refereed the England against Northern Ireland Home International at Wembley in 1983.

He also regularly refereed in Europe. In February 1981 he officiated at the Netherlands versus Cyprus World Cup qualifying match for the 1982 tournament. His most senior club competition tie came in the 1983–84 season with a UEFA Cup quarter-final first leg between Sparta Prague and Hajduk Split. He controlled two European Championships qualifiers – USSR versus Norway in 1986 and, coincidentally, in 1991 the same teams again, this time in Oslo. Shortly afterwards, he retired compulsorily from the FIFA list due to age restrictions.

== Personal life ==
King was married to Sian and has three kids.

In 1995 King was given a ten-year ban from any involvement in football after he admitted accepting prostitutes from clubs.

In 2005 King was reported to police after being spotted in a taxi cab parked at Garwnant Woodlands Park, an area notorious for people meeting up to take part in or watch sex.
