= Zdeněk Válek =

Czech footballer

Personal information
- Date of birth: 2 April 1958 (age 68)
- Place of birth: Czechoslovakia
- Position: Midfielder

Senior career*
Years	Team	Apps	(Gls)
1979–1980	TJ Vítkovice		
1980–1986	TJ Banik Ostrava OKD		
1986–1989	Bohemians ČKD Praha		

International career
1981–1984	Czechoslovakia	5	(1)
- * Club domestic league appearances and goals

Zdeněk Válek (born 2 April 1958) is a retired Czech footballer who played as a midfielder.

== Honours ==
- 1980–81 Czechoslovak First League
