= Marián Tomčák =

Slovak footballer

Personal information
- Full name: Marián Tomčák
- Date of birth: 13 July 1980 (age 46)
- Place of birth: Czechoslovakia
- Height: 1.84 m (6 ft 1/2 in)
- Position: Striker

Youth career
- FK Rača
- FKM Vinohrady Bratislava
- Inter Bratislava

Senior career*
Years	Team	Apps	(Gls)
1999–2006	Inter Bratislava	106	(17)
2000–2002	→ ŠKP (loan)		
2006	MFK Ružomberok	18	(2)
2007–2010	Spartak Trnava	40	(11)
2008–2009	→ Inter Bratislava (loan)		
2009	→ MFK Petržalka (loan)	18	(2)
2010	Rudar Velenje	17	(0)
2011	DAC Dunajská Streda	27	(3)
2012–2013	SC Neusiedl	0	(0)
- * Club domestic league appearances and goals as of 27 January 2012

Marián Tomčák (born 13 July 1980) is a retired Slovak football striker.

He previously played with Inter Bratislava, MFK Ružomberok, FC Spartak Trnava and MFK Petržalka in the Slovak Superliga, and with NK Rudar Velenje in the Slovenian First League.
