= Karol Brezík =

Slovak footballer (born 1959)

Personal information
- Date of birth: 9 April 1959 (age 67)
- Position: Striker

Senior career*
Years	Team	Apps	(Gls)
1976–1980	Inter Bratislava		
1980–1981	Dukla Banská Bystrica		
1982–1989	Inter Bratislava		
Total		308	(72)

International career
1982	Czechoslovakia	1	(0)

Managerial career
- 2004–2006: Inter Bratislava
- * Club domestic league appearances and goals

Karol Brezík (born 9 April 1959) is a football manager and former player who played as a striker. He played 308 times in the Czechoslovak First League, scoring 72 goals, as well as representing the national team of Czechoslovakia once. He was one of three players to make his debut for Czechoslovakia in Bratislava on 6 October 1982 in a 2–2 draw against Spain, playing the first half of the match. Brezík scored five goals in eight UEFA Cup matches, including four in a 10–0 win against Rabat Ajax in the 1983–84 UEFA Cup.

Brezík worked as assistant to head coach Jozef Barmoš at Inter Bratislava until replacing him in October 2004 after a run of poor results. He stepped away after 15 games of the 2005–06 Slovak Superliga, but returned for the 18th match. His tenure at Inter Bratislava concluded in March 2006 with the club second from last in the league table.
