= Valeri Gladilin =

Russian footballer (born 1951)

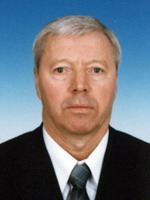

Personal information
- Full name: Valeri Pavlovich Gladilin
- Date of birth: 19 October 1951 (age 75)
- Place of birth: Salaryevo, Leninsky district, Russian SFSR (now Moscow)
- Height: 1.82 m (5 ft 11 1/2 in)
- Positions: Midfielder; forward

Team information
- Current team: FC Dnepr Smolensk (president)

Senior career*
Years	Team	Apps	(Gls)
1970–1972	FC Metallurg Krasnoyarsk	81	(12)
1974–1978	FC Spartak Moscow	131	(16)
1979–1982	FC Kairat	118	(31)
1983–1984	FC Spartak Moscow	38	(12)
1985–1987	FC Lokomotiv Moscow	81	(27)
1988	FC Meliorator Chimkent	24	(13)
1989	FC Uralmash Sverdlovsk	4	(0)
1989	Navbahor Namangan	9	(2)

Managerial career
- 1989: Navbahor Namangan
- 1997–1998: FC Spartak Moscow (assistant)
- 1998–1999: FC Dynamo Moscow (assistant)
- 2000–2001: Russia U-21
- 2002: FC MIKA
- 2002: FC Dynamo-SPb St. Petersburg
- 2009–: FC Dnepr Smolensk (president)
- * Club domestic league appearances and goals

Valeri Pavlovich Gladilin (Russian: Валерий Павлович Гладилин; born 19 October 1951) is a Russian politician and a former professional football coach and a player. He works as a president of FC Dnepr Smolensk. He also serves in the State Duma (elected from the United Russia party). From 2004 to 2008 he served in the Federation Council of Russia.

== Honours ==
- Soviet Top League runner-up: 1974, 1983, 1984.
