= Edvard Šoštarič =

Slovenian football referee (1941–2011)

Edvard Šoštarič (25 November 1941 – 1 September 2011) was a Yugoslav football referee from Slovenia.

Before getting into refereeing, Šoštarič played at lower-level clubs in his hometown of Maribor, at Železničar and later Branik, and also had a stint abroad in the early 1960s at SC Eisenstadt in neighboring Austria.

After retiring from playing he returned to Yugoslavia and passed his refereeing exam in 1964. In 1973 he gained his republic-level license, allowing him to referee lower-level matches, and in 1976 he obtained his federal-level license, allowing him to referee matches in the Yugoslav First League, the country's premier league championship.

He continued to work as a referee in domestic football well into the 1980s, and between 1980 and 1986 he was included on the FIFA International Referees List, making him eligible to officiate international matches and tournaments.

As such, he was selected as one of 22 referees to officiate in the 1984 Olympics football tournament, where he supervised the group match between Morocco and Saudi Arabia played at the Rose Bowl stadium in Pasadena. He also served as linesman in the matches Brazil vs Morocco and Italy vs Egypt.

After 1986 he retired and became a refereeing instructor and supervisor. In his later years he served as president of the Slovenian association of football referees, and a member of the executive committee of the Football Association of Slovenia (NZS).

Šoštarič died in Maribor in August 2011, three months short of his 70th birthday.
