= Wout Holverda =

Dutch footballer (1958–2021)

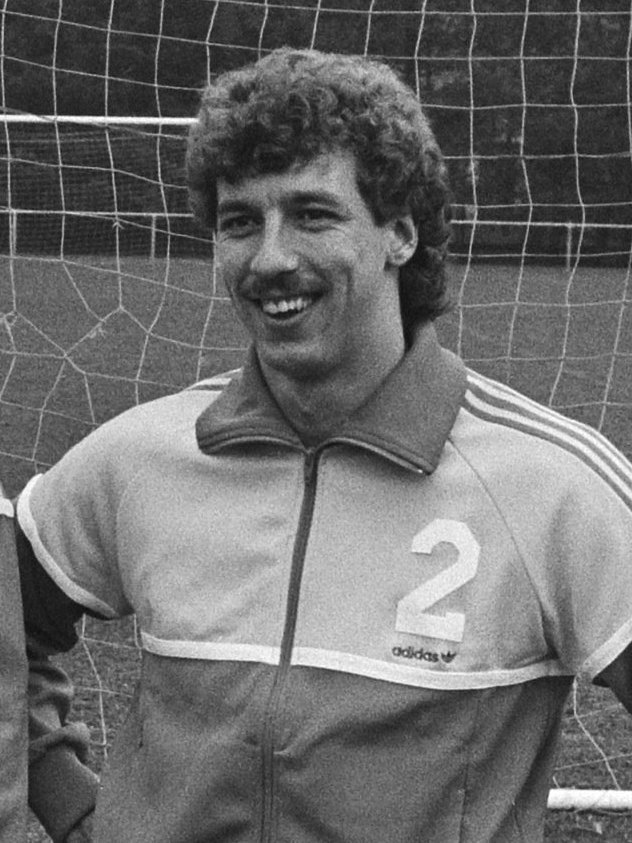
- Holverda (1984)

Personal information
- Date of birth: 22 April 1958
- Place of birth: Leiden, The Netherlands
- Date of death: 3 December 2021 (aged 63)
- Place of death: The Netherlands
- Position: Striker

Youth career
- Roodenburg

Senior career*
| Years | Team | Apps | (Gls) |
| 1978–1984 | Sparta | 138 | (56) |
| 1984–1987 | Fortuna Sittard | 76 | (17) |
| 1987–1990 | Haarlem | 76 | (16) |
| Total | | 290 | (89) |

International career
| 1979 | Netherlands U21 | 1 | (0) |
- * Club domestic league appearances and goals

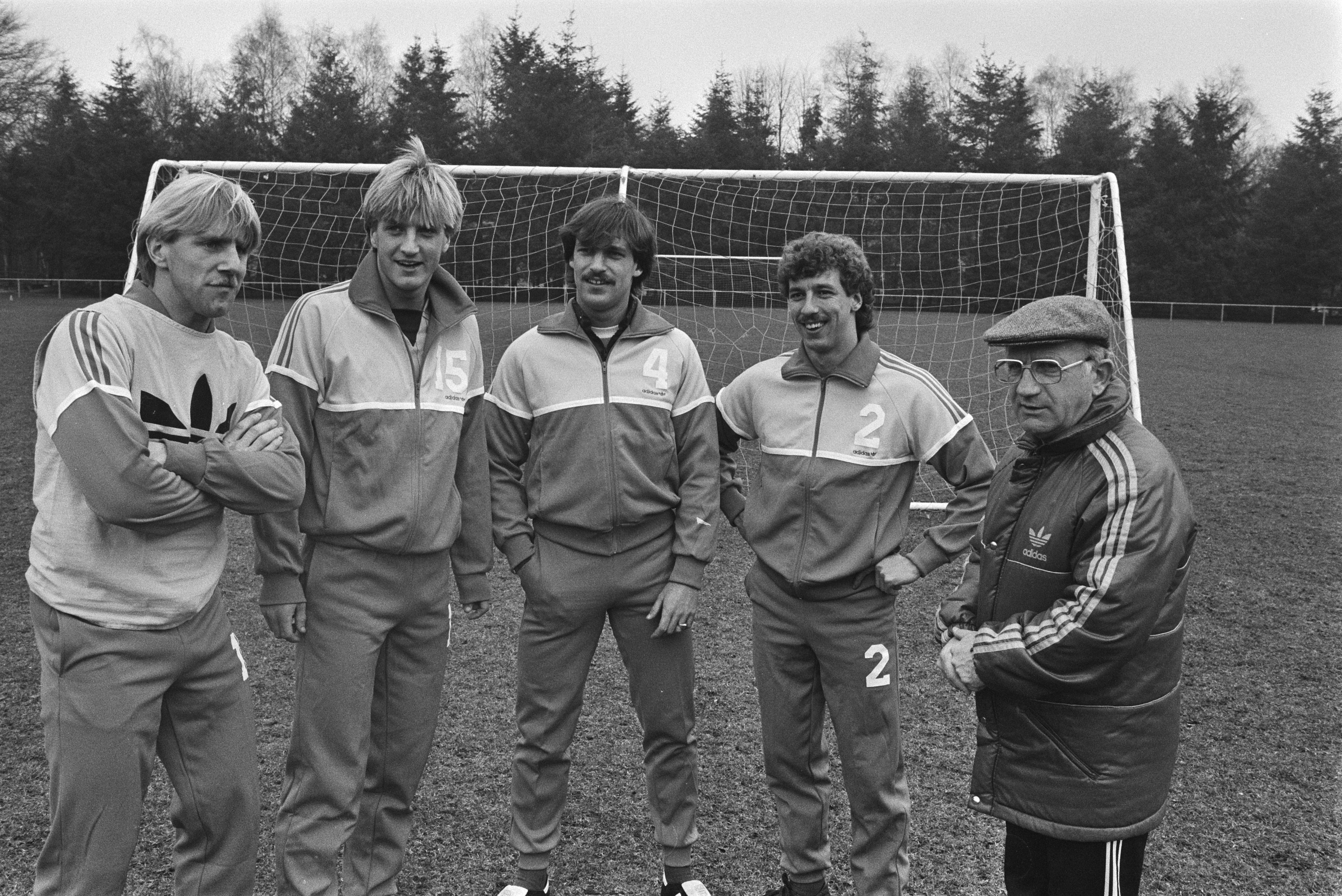
Sel. Netherlands nat. football team, 13 March 1984. From left: Hoekstra, Kieft, Van der Gijp, Holverda and Rijvers Photo: Marcel Antonisse (Anefo)

Wout Holverda (22 April 1958 – 3 December 2021) was a Dutch football striker who played most of his career for Sparta Rotterdam.

== Club career ==
A speedy and stocky forward, Holverda started his professional football career at Sparta and played seven seasons for them, ending up as their top goalscorer in the 1983–84 season. That earned him a move to Fortuna Sittard, where he played alongside British striker John Linford, but a niggling groin injury did not make him a success at Fortuna and he spent his last seasons at HFC Haarlem before retiring. He scored 61 goals in over 150 games in all competitions for Sparta and 14 in 70 games for Fortuna.

With Sparta as well as with Fortuna he played European Cup matches, 11 games in total (4 goals).

== International career ==
Holverda played once for Jong Oranje, coming on as a substitute for Ron Jans against Poland in May 1979. He received a call-up for the senior side who were playing Denmark in 1984, but did not play.

== Personal life ==
=== Alzheimer's disease ===
Holverda was diagnosed with Alzheimer's disease that prevented him from visiting Sparta matches. In September 2013, a group of supporters decided to help him and drive Holverda to Sparta matches for the remainder of the season.

=== Death ===
He died from COVID-19 on 3 December 2021, at the age of 63.
