= Johan Derksen =

Dutch footballer and journalist (born 1949)

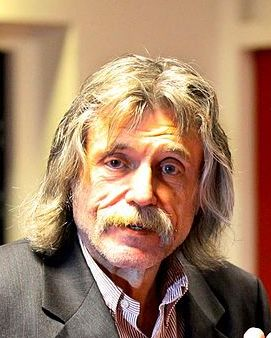
- Derksen in 2014
- Born: Johannes Gerrit Derksen; 31 January 1949 (age 77); Heteren, Netherlands
- Occupations: Sports journalist, pundit and analyst Publisher, editor-in-chief, author, columnist, television presenter
- Known for: Voetbal International (magazine); Voetbal International (TV show)
- Political party: VVD

Notes
Association football career
- Position: Defender
Youth career
- SDOO Heteren
- Nieuw-Buinen
- Rolder Boys
Senior career*
| Years | Team | Apps | (Gls) |
| 1966–1968 | Go Ahead Eagles | 0 | (0) |
| 1968–1972 | Cambuur | 100 | (3) |
| 1972–1975 | Veendam | 77 | (4) |
| 1975–1976 | Haarlem | 47 | (2) |
| 1976–1977 | Meppen | 7 | (0) |
| 1977 | MVV | 8 | (0) |
| Total | | 232 | (9) |
- * Club domestic league appearances and goals

Johannes Gerrit "Johan" Derksen (born 31 January 1949) is a Dutch sports journalist and former football player. He played professional football between 1966 and 1978 for six clubs: Go Ahead Eagles, Cambuur, Veendam, HFC Haarlem, SV Meppen and MVV Maastricht. During and after his footballing career, he became a sports journalist, specialising in football. He was the editor-in-chief of Voetbal International, the Netherlands' most prominent football magazine, from 2000 until his retirement in 2013. Derksen was while working at Voetbal International and after his retirement a television football pundit on RTL7's Voetbal International and Veronica Inside on Veronica TV. His current TV talkshow is Vandaag Inside on SBS6.

== Early life ==
Derksen was born as an only child in Heteren, Gelderland into a Protestant family. He described his father as being a very strict policeman, both professionally and at home. Derksen stated that his father wanted him to become a professional football player instead of a drummer; Derksen was already a member of local football team SDOO Heteren.

When he was a teenager, his family moved to Drenthe, where he later played for amateur football clubs Nieuw-Buinen and Rolder Boys. Derksen then moved to Deventer to join the youth academy of professional football club Go Ahead Eagles.

== Club career ==
=== Go Ahead Eagles (1966–1968) ===
Go Ahead Eagles were known for having one of the Netherlands' most successful youth academies. Derksen was one of the six players in the club's boarding school, together with Oeki Hoekema, André van der Leij, Ger Veerman, Herman Tieselink and Tiny Broers. In 1968, the 19-year-old left-back signed a one-year-contract with Cambuur.

=== Cambuur (1968–1972) ===
He made his debut on 1 August 1968 in a friendly against PEC Zwolle, and quickly developed into a reliable defender notorious for his rough playing style. His contract was later extended by another year.

In a game against Vitesse, he injured his knee and was forced to decline an invitation from the Dutch military football team. He did not return before the start of the next season. After fulfilling his military service, he was employed as a textile salesman, as Cambuur was a semi-professional club. In the summer of 1972, Derksen was transferred to Veendam.

=== Veendam (1972–1975) ===
In 1973, in Veendam's away match against Cambuur, Derksen received a yellow card from referee Gerard Jonker. Derksen later made a harsh foul by charging Cambuur's centre-back Sietse Visser in a scrimmage, leaving Visser severely injured; Jonker did not send Derksen off. Cambuur's chanted insults at Derksen, who gave the finger to the crowd. The police later closed the gates to ensure Veendam would be granted a safe passage home. Cambuur won the game 3–1.

According to some bystanders Derksen had threatened the Cambuur players that they "would indeed get a good licking". Derksen's charge fueled the debate on the ever more violent behaviour shown on the pitch. Derksen received a monetary fine (150 fl.) and was suspended for four games. His colleagues Dick Nanninga (3 matches, 100 fl. fine) and Jan Bont (1 match, 100 fl.) were also punished by the Arbitration committee.

A week later, Veendam put Johan Derksen on the transfer list. Veendam stated his behaviour in the match against Cambuur was "the last straw".

Despite rumours of a fl. 15.000 transfer agreement with FC VVV, no deal was concluded and Derksen stayed in Groningen for another season. A year later, he was released by Veendam. He stated in the press that only five players (including himself) were good enough to play in the Eerste Divisie.

In the January transfer window of 1975, Haarlem signed Derksen on a half-year deal.

=== Haarlem (1975–1976) ===
Derksen immediately made an impression; he formed the link Haarlem's defence had missed, and his contract was extended by a year. Haarlem, with Derksen, took the 1975–76 Eerste Divisie title and won promotion back to the Eredivisie.

=== SV Meppen (1976–1977) ===
In 1976, he signed for West German team SV Meppen, who were playing in the Oberliga Nord, the third tier of German football. Derksen, who lived in Emmen, wanted to play for a more local club; Meppen is situated across the German-Dutch border, while Haarlem is located in western Netherlands.

In November 1976, Derksen made a TV appearance in the "Mini-voetbalshow" (English: mini football show), a futsal tournament and an initiative of VI and NCRV, representing the Northern Netherlands football team. In 1977, Derksen was named the coach of the Northern Netherlands team.

He did not play professional football for eight months. In the spring of 1977, he signed a contract with MVV Maastricht. The 28-year-old defender signed a provisional contract valid until the end of the season. He was signed to replace John Webb, who departed for the United States to serve out his outstanding contract with Chicago Sting.

=== MVV Maastricht (1977) ===
Although Derksen did not play football for a long time, he did very well in his first games. His manager George Knobel stated: "I am very happy with Johan Derksen. He has the experience to deal with this kind of thing." In an article published in Voetbal International, Derksen asked "what the world had come to when creative players in the Eerste Divisie cannot freely practice their job", after which he was widely criticised. Derksen was noted as one of the most aggressive players in the Eerste Divisie.

== Career statistics ==
Appearances and goals by club, season and competition
| Club | Season | League | | |
| Club | Season | Division | Apps | Goals |
|---|---|---|---|---|
| Veendam | 1973–74 | | 30 | 1 |
| HFC Haarlem | 1974–75 | Eredivisie | 15 | 1 |
| HFC Haarlem | 1975–76 | | 32 | 1 |

== Journalistic career ==
After his professional footballing career, he focused mainly on his journalistic career. Derksen started writing in the regional daily Dagblad De Noord-Ooster, later becoming an editor for the Winschoter Courant and Nieuwsblad van het Noorden. Starting on 1 February 1977, he was employed by weekly magazine Voetbal International (VI). Since 2000 he was the magazine's editor-in-chief. He confessed to have written for VI before as a side job, using the pseudonyms "Gerrit Westers" and "Freek Zoontjes", without his employer's permission.

=== Cambuur incident ===
Johan Derksen claimed in VI that Cambuur had paid a large sum of money to keep Oeki Hoekema from being suspended. According to Derksen, Vlaardingen player Herman den Haag had received a few banknotes from a Cambuur official whilst on the toilet. De Volkskrant called KNVB official Van Zon, who stated he had laughed very hard when he heard the claims: "Money handed out on the toilet? How did he come up with that? I have seen it with my own eyes: the Cambuur representative gave the cash to the witnesses. No, not on the toilet but in public in the bar of our restaurant. It wasn't much money either, If I recall correctly it was fl. 50. Those few ten-guilder notes aren't even enough to cover the witnesses' expenses, since all the witnesses had to travel from Rotterdam to here. The KNVB pays fl. 0.35 per kilometre." "Quite a crappy story indeed, Derksen wrote, but then again, that's what we're accustomed to. You wanna know who were present in court at the time? Me, another journalist and a man with a tape recorder. Derksen wasn't there. Probably on the toilet."

=== Becoming CEO of BV Veendam ===
In the spring of 2002, Derksen agreed to become the new CEO of Veendam. He would lead the club together with manager Jan Korte and quit his job as editor-in-chief of Voetbal International immediately, where he had worked for almost 25 years. Two days after he was presented as successor of Henk Nienhuis he reversed his decision. He did not agree to the contract presented to him because of the retirement arrangements. Derksen called the contract "outrageous and shameless".

=== Controversies ===
In his role as panelist in various television programmes, Derksen has been occasionally criticized for his jokes and remarks against women, ethnic minorities and the gay community. In 2020, during the aftermath of the murder of George Floyd, some Dutch football players and advertisers criticized him for minimizing racism in the Netherlands, and for joking about a Zwarte Piet protester as possibly being black Dutch rapper Akwasi. Derksen compared the protester with the rapper in a cynical manner, later inciting "I had never heard of Akwasi. I saw him yelling and inciting violence during the [Black Lives Matter] protest at the Dam Square. It was a peaceful and good demonstration. How is it possible that such a person hijacks a demonstration?" Broadcaster Veronica refused to reprimand Derksen, and he did not withdraw his words nor apologized. A number of companies reconsidered their advertising contracts with the programme Veronica Inside. Furthermore, internationals of the Netherlands national team decided to boycott the programme.

In April 2022, Derksen stated in his TV talkshow Vandaag Inside that during his tenure at Veendam he and the club's goalkeeper had "penetrated an unconscious woman with a candle"; according to Derksen "technically a prosecutor could have seen the act as rape." Derksen qualified the incident as a "youthful error". The following day, several prominent Dutch people stated that Derksen should be banned from TV. Dutch prosecutors did open inquiry "aimed at establishing the truth of possible criminal behaviour that was discussed in that programme.” Derksen himself refused to make apologies for the incident claiming "it happened in the zeitgeist of then." On 27 April, he did retract the sexual assault story, claiming he had not penetrated the woman but had put a candle between her legs. Veendam's goalkeeper, Dick Ploeger, stated he could not remember the event and that he could not imagine the story to be true. Derksen's colleagues at Vandaag Inside, René van der Gijp and Johan Boskamp, claimed Derksen's story was fabricated. Derksen and his colleagues at Vandaag Inside quit the program on 29 April; but they and Vandaag Inside returned on television on 16 May 2022. The criminal inquiry into the case was closed on 2 June 2022; prosecutors had questioned Derksen but the case was dismissed due to the facts could not be established. The alleged victim was not questioned because she had not been identified.

== Personal life ==
Derksen has been married three times. At age 41 he lost his wife in an accident, leaving him and a twelve-year-old daughter behind. He remarried a younger wife with whom he has one daughter. After a year they divorced. He then met and married his current wife; they do not have children together, but his step-son is also working at Voetbal International as a photographer. Derksen is a republican and a staunch atheist.

=== Music ===
Derksen's greatest passion is music. He has been a fan of blues and soul music. As an adolescent, he met singer Harry Muskee of the Dutch blues band Cuby & the Blizzards, who became his idol. In 1972, the band dissolved; in 1996, Derksen and businessmen Henk Aa and Jan Lagendijk founded "Cuby is back", a foundation committed to bring the band back. The band members later reunited and recorded a new album, while their tour was considered a success.

Music is the only thing that moves me.

— Derksen live at De Wereld Draait Door. (05-09-2007)

Derksen worked for the American record label Stax in the late 1970s. As a press officer in Haarlem it was part of his job to make sure the visiting American musicians got everything they needed. He jokingly referred to himself as a "notorious whore-hopper", since he accompanied American soul artists to the red-light district De Wallen in Amsterdam almost weekly.

Derksen stated he dislikes "happy music"; for him music cannot be melancholic enough. According to Derksen, the greatest artist of all time is the American singer-songwriter Mickey Newbury. Derksen has made plans to move to the United States, a country he refers to as a "heaven of music". In 2012, he said he won't move to the United States because of the death penalty.

Derksen's successful insistence that Danny Vera would play in his TV talkshows VI and Voetbal Inside launched Vera's musical career.

From 2014 until May 2022 Derksen was an unpaid employee of the theater agency AT Next, during concert tours of ensembles of blues artists he acted as ringmaster. AT Next terminated its collaboration with Derksen on 29 April 2022 after Derksen refused to apologise for having told, earlier that month, a story on TV about "penetrating an unconscious woman with a candle".

== Writing ==
Derksen has written several books on football.

- Derksen, J., & Collette, R. (1983) Wiel Coerver: Leerplan voor de ideale voetballer, Amsterdam: Elsevier. ISBN 978-90-10-04796-0
- Derksen, J., Coerver, W., Lehmann, M. (1984). Fußballtechnik : Dribbeln und Tricksen, Passen und Schießen. München; Wien; Zürich : BLV-Verlagsgesellschaft. ISBN 3-405-12952-4
- Derksen, J., Coerver, W., Nieuwenkamp, H J. (1986). Scoren : opleiding voor attractief en productief voetbal. Amsterdam : Elsevier. ISBN 90-10-06076-4
- Derksen, J., Hughes, B., Raucamp, W. (1987). Barry Hughest : de entertainer. Amsterdam : Weekbladpers. ISBN 90-940092-7-7
- Derksen, J., & Verkamman, M. (1989). Het Nederlands Elftal : 1905–1989 : de historie van Oranje. Amsterdam: Weekbladpers. ISBN 90-236-7211-9
- Derksen, J., Coerver, W., Arcidiacono, A., (1990). A scuola di goal : per apprendere e migliorare le tecniche del calcio. Roma: Gremese. ISBN 88-7605-487-1
- Derksen, J., & Verkamman, M. (1996). Het Nederlands elftal : de historie van Oranje 1905–1989. Amsterdam: Luitingh-Sijthoff. ISBN 90-245-2605-1
- Derksen, J. (1998). Linkspoot. Amsterdam: Anthos. Antwerpen: Icarus. ISBN 90-76341-91-5
- Derksen, J., Nederhof, B., Van Cuilenborg, C., Bakker, J. (2000). De beste interviews van 2000. Naarden: Strengholt. ISBN 90-5860-064-5
- Derksen, J. & Jansma, K. (2002). De columnisten. Naarden: Strengholt. ISBN 90-5860-197-8
- Derksen, J., Verkamman, M., Van den Nieuwenhof, F., Van der Meer, E. (2004). 50 jaar betaald voetbal : de complete geschiedenis. Eindhoven: De Boekenmakers. ISBN 90-77740-03-1
- Derksen, J., Borst, H., Spaan, H. (2007) Feyenoord. De top & flop 100, sterren & miskopen volgens Johan Derksen, Henk Spaan & Hugo Borst. Allround Media Producties. ISBN 978-90-79254-01-9.
- Derksen, J., Barend, F., Borst, H., Van Cuilenborg, C., Groot de, J., Nederhof, B., Verkamman, M. (2007) Johan Cruijff. Gouda: Nummer 14. ISBN 978-90-811654-1-9
- Derksen, J., Borst, H., Driessen, L., Echtelt van, H., Jong de, W., Nederhof, B., Nijnatten van, C., Verkamman, M., Visser, J. (2008) Willem van Hanegem. Uitgeverij de Buitenspelers. ISBN 90-71359-03-4
