= Eelco Gelling =

Dutch blues guitarist

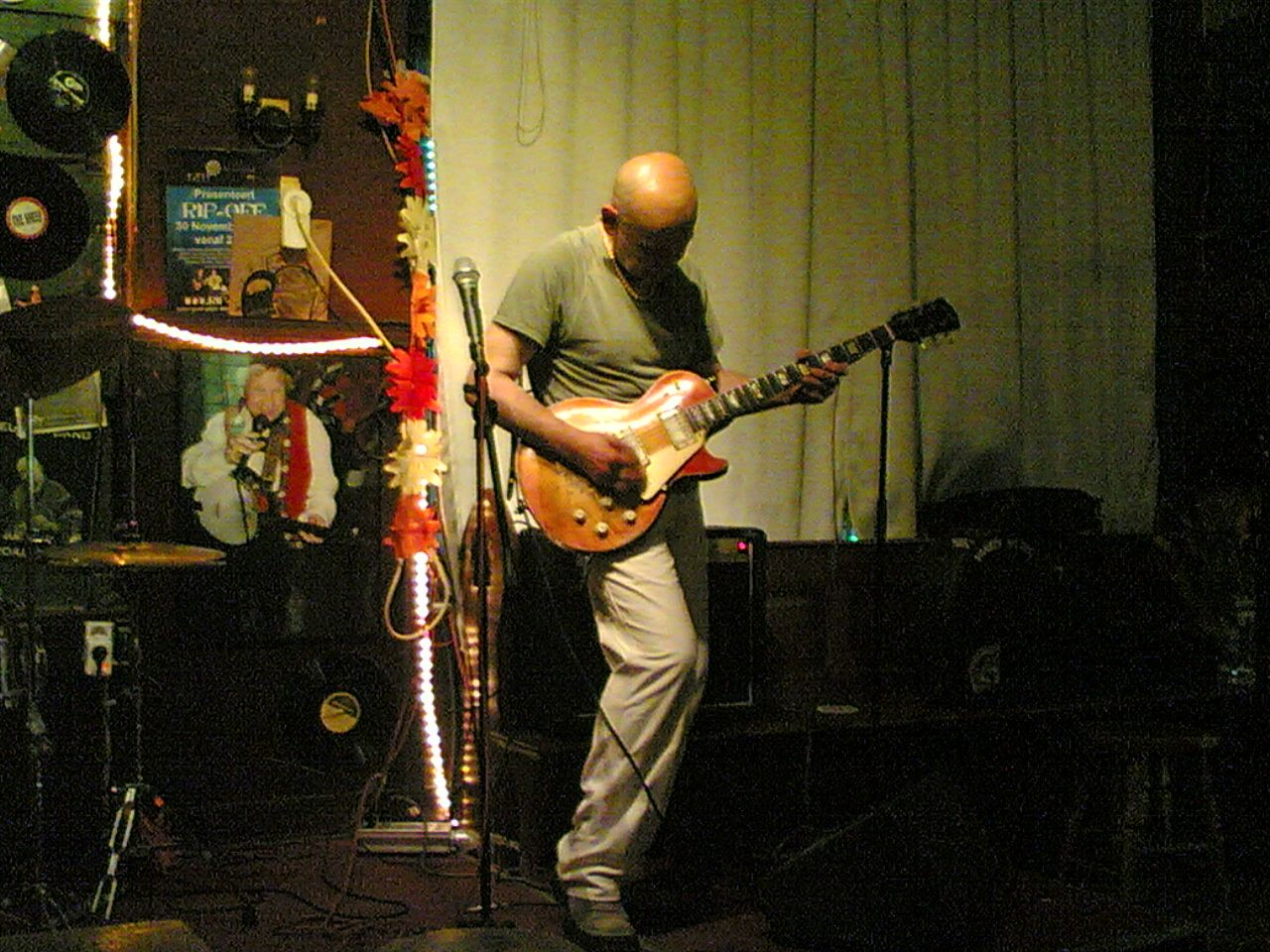
- Eelco Gelling (formerly of Cuby + Blizzards) at the last opening night of Café de Beukelsbrug in Rotterdam (27 June 2009)

Background information
- Born: 12 June 1946 (age 80); Zwartsluis, Netherlands
- Genres: Blues rock, jazz rock, instrumental rock, hard rock
- Occupations: Musician, songwriter
- Instrument: Guitar
- Years active: 1965–present
- Labels: Philips, Fontana, Mercury Records, Polydor
- Website: Eelco Gelling Band

Eelco Gelling (born 12 June 1946) is a Dutch blues rock guitarist. Gelling played with Cuby + Blizzards (which he co-founded together with Harry Muskee) until 1976.

== Cuby + Blizzards (1966–1974) ==
Cuby + Blizzards (C+B) was founded by Eelco Gelling and Harry Muskee in 1964. Their first single was released in 1965 followed by a string of albums starting in 1966. During his time with Cuby + Blizzards the band became famous in Holland, Germany and the UK.

They played, recorded and toured with Eddie Boyd, Van Morrison and Alexis Korner. In 1966 they toured with John Mayall and when Mayall came to the Netherlands to stay for a couple of days, he asked Gelling to join the Bluesbreakers. Gelling declined and stayed with Cuby + Blizzards.

The 1969 album Appleknockers Flophouse is considered one of the greatest Dutch Blues albums. The guitar work is comparable to that of contemporaries like Eric Clapton, Peter Green and Mick Taylor.

The band recorded their last album in 1974, named Het Afscheidsconcert (The Farewell Concert). Harry Muskee and Eelco formed Red, White 'n Blue but after two singles and an album reunited with Herman Brood in 1976 for a short period to record two more Cuby albums, Kid Blue and Old times, Good times. In the early 1990s C+B was re-formed, this time without Gelling.

== Golden Earring (1976-1979) ==
In 1976, Gelling joined Dutch band Golden Earring, with whom he played with for several years. He first appeared as a fully fledged member on "Contraband" (released in the U.S. under the title "Mad Love"). Eelco's haunting slide work is highlighted on the tracks "Sueleen" and "Bombay". While out on tour the group recorded their first live album, Golden Earring Live, which included an extended version of the group's hit "Radar Love". Gelling also plays on the group's Grab it for a Second album. During a tour in the United States, he left the band. After discussions about differences in musical style and after his favorite guitar, a Gibson Les Paul, was stolen from a cab in New York, he left Golden Earring and returned to the Netherlands.

== 80s and 90s ==
When Eelco returned to Holland, Harry Muskee asked him to join the Muskee Gang. During a recording session, Eelco was fired and left for The Hague to join the Freelance band.

He played in several bands and after a few years started his own, the Eelco Gelling Band.

== 2000s and onwards ==
In 2000 Eelco joined The Hague local band, Xray for a show in Doornroosje in Nijmegen. A live recording with two original songs was released in early 2001.

On 25 June 2010 the Eelco Gelling Band performed for the last time, since then the band continued as Kroppo's Blues Band, without Gelling.

In 2010, C+B Classic, Window of my eyes was used in the movie The American featuring George Clooney.

In 2012, Eelco appeared in the documentary 'Gitaar Jongens' (Guitar Guys) by Henny Vrienten. Eelco was interviewed at home and appeared on stage at the Royal Carre to play with Jan Akkerman. Eelco hadn't played for a couple of years and has since been working to get back in shape. In 2013 and 2014, Jan Akkerman asked Eelco to join him for some shows in Zoetermeer and Groningen.

On April 14, 2015, Eelco was inducted in the Dutch Blues Hall of Fame and presented with a trophy by former C+B manager Johan Derksen. He also received a 45-year-overdue Gold Record for Groeten uit Grollo. Eelco played a surprise set with Ruben Hoeke and Raymond van Kuijen.

On April 29, 2015, Eelco opened the exposition, "Eelco Gelling, Geweldenaar op de Gitaar" (Savage or Giant on Guitar) at the C+B Museum in Grolloo.

== Guitars and amps ==
Eelco's primary guitar is his famous sunburst 1960 Gibson Les Paul. Eelco has owned this guitar since the early Cuby days when he traded his Gibson ES-330 for it. The guitar has been stolen, broken, abused and was recently restored to former glory. Eelco used a Fender Concert (4x10) or a Marshall 100 watt stack to amplify his guitar. In the 1980s, when Eelco played with Blues Connection, he usually resorted to playing on his Acoustic Control Corporation Model 165 combo. After departing from Blues Connection in the early 1990s, Eelco started using both the Koch KC50 and the Koch Multitone amplifiers. Recently he has switched back to Marshalls and now uses a small Marshall Class 5 combo.

== Discography ==
=== Singles with Cuby and the Blizzards ===
Single title	Release date	Charting in the Dutch Top 40			Comments
Single title	Release date	Date of entry	Highest	Weeks	Comments
Stumble And Fall/I'm So Restless	1965	-	-	-	-
LSD Got A Million Dollars/Your Body Not Your Soul	1966	-	-	-	-
Back Home/Sweet Mary	1966	17-09-1966	33	4	Philips
Richard Cory/You Don't Know	1966	-	-	-	-
Just For Fun/Things I Remember	1967	18-03-1967	34	4	Philips
Another Day, Another Road/Feeling Like A Suitcase	1967	15-07-1967	20	7	Philips
Distant Smile/Don't Know Which Way To Go	1967	16-12-1967	20	6	-
The Sunshine Of Your Shadow/Crying Tears	1967	-	-	-	-
Another Land/Somebody Will Know Someday	1967	-	-	-	-
Window Of My Eyes/Checkin' Up On My Baby	1968	28-09-1968	10	10	Philips
Nostalgic Toilet/116 a Queensway	1968	-	-	-	-
Appleknockers Flophouse/Because Of Illness	1969	-	-	-	-
Thursday Night/Wee Wee Baby	1970	-	-	-	-
Backstreet/Easy To Leave Hard To Forget	1971	-	-	-	-
Pawnbroker/Straight No Chaser	1972	-	-	-	-
Sometimes/Every Time	1972	-	-	-	-
Kid Blue/Perfect Song	1976	-	-	-	-
Going To The City/Maybe We Need	1977	-	-	-	-

=== Albums with Cuby and the Blizzards ===
Album title	Release date	Charting in the Dutch Album Top 100			Comments
Album title	Release date	Date of entry	Highest	Weeks	Comments
Desolation	1966	-	-	-	-
Praise The Blues	1967	met Eddie Boyd -	-	-	-
Groeten Uit Grollo	1967	-	-	-	-
Trippin' Thru' A Midnight Blues	1968	-	-	-	-
Live! At Düsseldorf	1968	met Alexis Korner -	-	-	-
On The Road	1968	-	-	-	-
Cuby's Blues	1969	-	-	-	-
Appleknockers Flophouse	1969	-	-	-	-
Too Blind To See	1970	-	-	-	-
King Of The World	1970	-	-	-	-
Simple Man	1971	-	-	-	-
Sometimes	1972	-	-	-	-
Ballads	1973	-	-	-	-
Afscheidsconcert	1974	-	-	-	-
Kid Blue	1976	-	-	-	-
Old Times Good Times	1977	-	-	-	-
The Forgotten Tapes	1979	-	-	-	-
Featuring Herman Brood Live	1979	-	-	-	-
Blues Traveller	2000	4-cd -	-	-	-

=== Singles with The Tower ===
Single title	Release date	Charting in the Dutch Top 40			Comments
Single title	Release date	Date of entry	Highest	Weeks	Comments
In Your Life/Slow Motion Mind	1968	-	-	-	-
Captain Decker/Steps into space	1969	-	-	-	-

=== Singles with Red White 'n Blue ===
Single title	Release date	Charting in the Dutch Top 40			Comments
Single title	Release date	Date of entry	Highest	Weeks	Comments
Master Of Planning/Pigeon Girl	1975	-	-	-	-
Happyville/ Country Life	1976	-	-	-	-

=== Albums with Red White 'n Blue ===
Album title	Release date	Charting in the Dutch Album Top 100			Comments
Album title	Release date	Date of entry	Highest	Weeks	Comments
Red White 'n Blue	1975	-	-	-	-

=== Singles with Golden Earring ===
Single title	Release date	Charting in the Dutch Top 40			Comments
Single title	Release date	Date of entry	Highest	Weeks	Comments
Radar Love Live	1977	-	-	-	-
Movin' Down Life/Can't Talk Now	1978	-	-	-	-

=== Albums with Golden Earring ===
Album title	Release date	Charting in the Dutch Album Top 100			Comments
Album title	Release date	Date of entry	Highest	Weeks	Comments
Contraband	1977	-	-	-	-
Live	1977	-	-	-	-
Grab It For A Second	1978	-	-	-	-

=== Albums with Freelance Band ===
Album title	Release date	Charting in the Dutch Album Top 100			Comments
Album title	Release date	Date of entry	Highest	Weeks	Comments
Rough 'n' Tough	1980	-	-	-	-

=== Albums with the Muskee Gang ===
Album title	Release date	Charting in the Dutch Album Top 100			Comments
Album title	Release date	Date of entry	Highest	Weeks	Comments
Rimshots In The Dark	1986	-	-	-	-

=== Albums with Blues Connection ===
Album title	Release date	Charting in the Dutch Album Top 100			Comments
Album title	Release date	Date of entry	Highest	Weeks	Comments
Featuring Eelco Gelling	1988	-	-	-	-

=== Solo albums ===
Album title	Release date	Charting in the Dutch Album Top 100			Comments
Album title	Release date	Date of entry	Highest	Weeks	Comments
The Missing Link	2000	dubbel cd	-	-	-

=== Albums with Eelco Gelling Band ===
Album title	Release date	Charting in the Dutch Album Top 100			Comments
Album title	Release date	Date of entry	Highest	Weeks	Comments
On The Road	2005	-	-	-	-
