= Erwin Java =

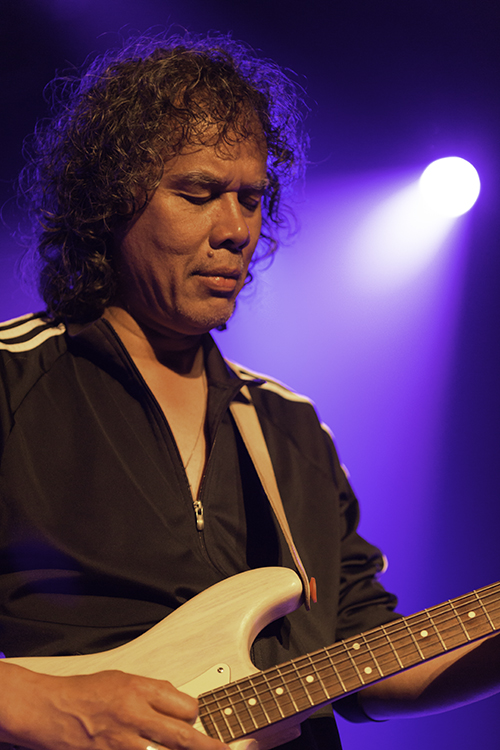
- Java, April 2013

Background information
- Born: 1956 (age 68–69); Assen
- Origin: Dutch
- Occupation: Guitarist

Erwin Raymond Java (Assen, 1956) is a Dutch guitarist, active since the 1970s, and a music teacher.

== Biography ==
Java got his first guitar, a Fender Stratocaster, from his father when he was a teenager. After attending the gymnasium in Assen, he studied Dutch language and literature at the Rijksuniversiteit Groningen. Later he attained a degree in music, majoring in guitar, from the Prince Claus Conservatoire.

One of his first bands was White Honey, from 1978 to 1981, where he played with Hanneke Kappen. When that band stopped, he joined Herman Brood's Wild Romance (1980–1981), and in 1986 joined Cuby and the Blizzards, a band headed by singer Harry Muskee, for whom Java was a chauffeur for a quarter of a century. Java also plays as a session musician and produces music, and has recorded with and done production for Marjol Flore, Splitsing, Gina de Wit, Bertus Borgers, Daniel Sahuleka, Kaz Lux, and Tineke Schoemaker.

In 1996 he co-founded the Noorder Muziek Instituut in Groningen, a professional private music school, where he also taught guitar.

== Discography ==
Source: Encyclopedie van Drenthe.

=== With White Honey ===
- Some Kinda Woman (1979)

=== With Cuby and the Blizzards/Harry Muskee ===
- Rimshots in the Dark (1986)
- Cut de Luxe (1990)
- Muskee Live (1991)
- Skysongs on the Spot (1994)
- Cuby is Back – Live (1997)
- Dancin' Bear (1998)
- Hotel Grolloo (2000)
