= Wilfred Genee =

Dutch television and radio presenter (born 1967)

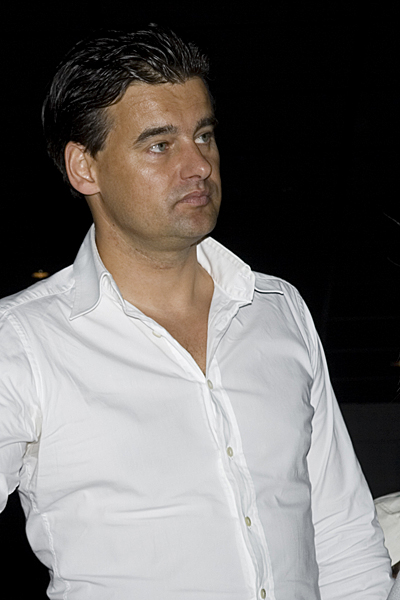
- Genee in 2009
- Born: 27 June 1967 (age 59)
- Occupations: Television presenter; Radio presenter; Singer

Wilfred Genee (born 27 June 1967) is a Dutch television and radio presenter. He is known for presenting the television shows Vandaag Inside and Voetbal Inside, with René van der Gijp and Johan Derksen as co-hosts. He presents the radio show The Friday Move for BNR Newsradio. Genee is also a singer and he has released multiple singles and one album.

== Career ==
=== Television ===
In 1996, he was one of the presenters of the sports channel Sport 7. The channel closed within four months after launch.

Genee presented the show Tour du Jour about cycle sport from 2011 to 2017. Bart Nolles succeeded him as presenter of the show. In 2016, he presented the association football quiz show Matchwinner for RTL 7. Hélène Hendriks presented the second season of the show titled Matchwinner Pro in 2017.

Genee, René van der Gijp and Johan Derksen, at the time presenters of the television show Voetbal Inside, were added to the RTL Walk of Fame in 2016. He won the Zilveren Televizier-Ster award for best presenter in 2017.

He presented the television show Het Debat van Nederland, an election debate leading up to the 2023 Dutch general election. He also presented this show in 2025 leading up to the 2025 Dutch general election. Merel Ek was a co-presenter in 2023 and 2025. Sam Hagens was also a co-presenter in 2023.

Genee was one of the presenters of the 2024 television show De Beste Wensen in which the presenters make dreams come true. In December 2024, Genee, René van der Gijp and Johan Derksen renewed their contract with Talpa Network to also present the Vandaag Inside show in 2025 and 2026.

He was nominated for the Televizier-Ring Presentator award for best presenter in 2025. The show Vandaag Inside won the Gouden Televizier-Ring award in 2025. In July and August 2026, he presented Mi Dushi: Wat is dan liefde?, a show in which celebrity couples are interviewed about their relationship. Since November 2026, he presents the show Vier Linkerhanden, a show about conversations with guests while working on a do it yourself project.

=== Radio ===
Genee presents the radio show The Friday Move for BNR Newsradio. The show airs on Friday and features multiple guests with backgrounds in politics, culture and entertainment. The show was nominated for the 2018 Gouden RadioRing and the 2023 Gouden RadioRing award.

He also hosted the radio show Veronica Inside Ochtendshow for Radio Veronica. The show was previously called Veronica Inside and the show won the Gouden RadioRing award in 2020. Genee stopped presenting the radio show as it was not possible to combine it with the television talk show Vandaag Inside which began in 2022.

=== Singing ===
Genee is also a singer and he has released multiple singles and one album. In 2012, Genee and Johan Derksen released a CD titled De helden van Oranje & friends with songs about association football and the Netherlands national football team. The CD also featured other artists, including Bennie Jolink, Edwin Evers and Gerard Joling. The CD achieved the Golden CD status after selling more than 25,000 copies. They also released the singles Nederland is helemaal oranje and Helden from this album.

Genee released Jij krijgt die ring niet van ons cadeau in 2020 with John de Bever and Dennis Schouten. The song is an adaptation of John de Bever's song Jij krijgt die lach niet van mijn gezicht. He recorded the song as part of a campaign to win the Gouden RadioRing award for the radio show Veronica Inside. A year later, Genee and his wife played a role in the music video of John de Bever's single Ik ga leven. Genee, Wesley Sneijder and Andy van der Meijde, as the musical group De Offsiders, released the single Een Aperolletje in 2023. In the same year, Genee and Bas Nijhuis, as the musical group De Thuisfluiters, released the single Er staat een kaars in de gang, an adaptation of André van Duin's song Er staat een paard in de gang.

In 2024, Genee released the single Johnny Rep, a tribute to Dutch footballer Johnny Rep, and an adaptation of the single Johnny Däpp by Austrian DJ Lorenz Büffel. In the same year, he released the single Zomaar een avond in de kroeg. In 2025, Genee released the single Zoek jezelf broeder. He also collaborated again with John de Bever and they released the single Koekoek. In 2026, he released the singles Blijgelovig and Korrel Zout.

=== Podcasts ===
Genee hosted the podcast Littekens (Dutch for scars) in 2019 and 2020. The podcast is centered around stories that have left visible or invisible scars. Since 2025, he hosts the podcast Zolang het leuk is for BNR Newsradio. In this podcast, he does not know the guest ahead of time and the conversation lasts as long as it is fun (hence the title of the podcast Zolang het leuk is). The podcast was nominated for best podcast in the category Beste Interview at the 2025 Dutch Podcast Awards. The podcast won the award in the category Beste Interview at the 2026 Dutch Podcast Awards.

=== Television appearances ===
He was a contestant in a 2011 episode of the game show De Jongens tegen de Meisjes. He also appeared as guest in a 2014 episode of the show 5 jaar later, in which he was interviewed by Jeroen Pauw based on an interview that was recorded in 2004. Genee and Britt Dekker were guests in an episode of the 2020 television show Het hek van de dam, a show about shepherding and conversations between the guests. Genee, René van der Gijp and Johan Derksen were contestants in a 2022 episode of the game show Marble Mania, in which contestants compete with marbles.

== Selected filmography ==
=== As presenter ===
- Tour du Jour (2011 – 2017)
- Matchwinner (2016)
- Voetbal Inside
- Vandaag Inside
- Het Debat van Nederland (2023, 2025)
- De Beste Wensen (2024)
- Mi Dushi: Wat is dan liefde? (2026)
- Vier Linkerhanden (2026)

=== As contestant ===
- De Jongens tegen de Meisjes (2011)
- Marble Mania (2022)

=== As himself ===
- 5 jaar later (2014)
- Het hek van de dam (2020)

== Discography ==
=== Albums ===
- De helden van Oranje & friends (2012)

=== Singles ===
- Nederland is helemaal oranje (2012)
- Helden (2012)
- Jij krijgt die ring niet van ons cadeau (2020)
- Een Aperolletje (2023)
- Er staat een kaars in de gang (2023)
- Johnny Rep (2024)
- Zomaar een avond in de kroeg (2024)
- Zoek jezelf broeder (2025)
- Koekoek (2025)
- Blijgelovig (2026)
- Korrel Zout (2026)
