= Voetbal Inside =

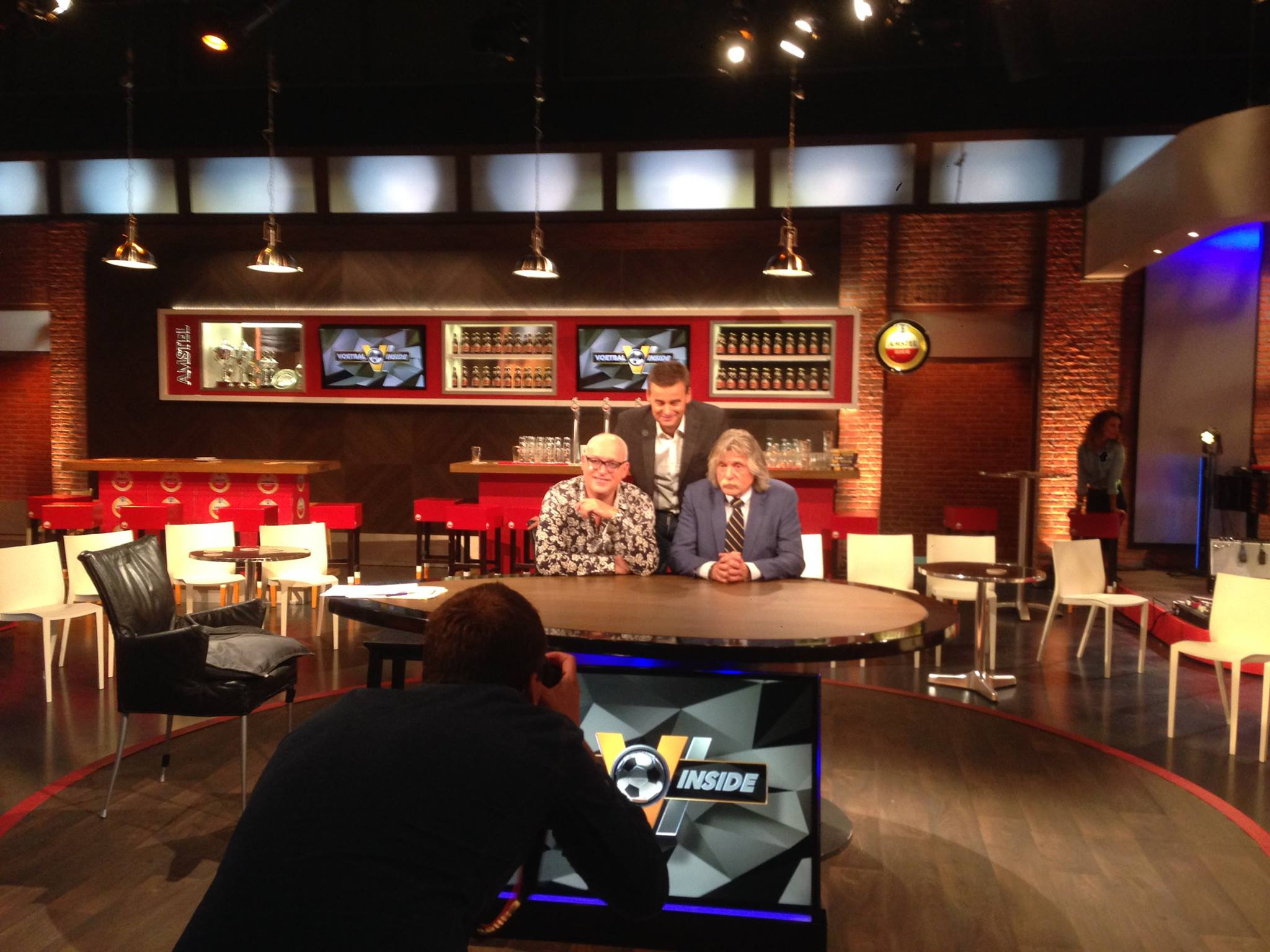
- Voetbal Inside
- Created by: RTL Nederland
- Presented by: Wilfred Genee
- Country of origin: Netherlands

Production
- Running time: 90 minutes

Original release
- Network: RTL 7
- Release: 2001

Voetbal Inside (previously named as Voetbal Inside (2001–2007), RTL Voetbal Inside (2007–2008) and Voetbal International (2008–2015)) is a Dutch football talk show that has aired on TV channel RTL 7. In a studio, host Wilfred Genee discusses the latest developments in Dutch and international football with Johan Derksen, René van der Gijp and a guest. The program is named after and sponsored by the football magazine Voetbal International. Other sponsors include the Eerste Divisie, Toto, Gillette, FOX Sports and Sport1. Voetbal Inside is known for its humoristic moments and remarks.

In 2011, the talk show won the prestigious Dutch television award the "Gouden Televizierring" and Wilfred Genee won the "Zilveren Televisie-Ster" in 2017 for being the best host.

== Host ==
- 2001–2005, 2007–present, Wilfred Genee
- 2006, Barbara Barend

== Permanent guests ==
- 2008–present, René van der Gijp
- 2001–present, Johan Derksen
- 2009–2020, Danny Vera with band

== Regular guests ==
- 2008–2021, Hans Kraay, Jr.
- 2010–2022, Johan Boskamp
- 2012–2016, Wim Kieft
- 2014–present, Valentijn Driessen
- 2014–2022, Gertjan Verbeek

== Returning guests ==
- 2010–2014, Barbara Barend
- 2010–2014, Jan Joost van Gangelen
- 2011–2014, Aad de Mos
- 2011–2012, Willem van Hanegem
- 2010–2011, Erik Dijkstra
- 2010–2011, Wouter Bos
- 2011, Iwan van Duren
- 2011, Jan Everse
- 2011, Koert Westerman
- 2010–2014, Emile Schelvis
- 2016, Peter Hyballa

== Ratings and "Televizierring" ==
The rating of the first episode from the newest season was a record with 831,000 viewers and was in the top 10 ratings that night (17 August). The last record is from 28 February 2011. René van der Gijp was nominated individually in 2010 for the "Televizier Talent Award" for best television newcomer. On 1 October 2011, the nominees were announced for the 2011 "Gouden Televizierring". Johan Derksen was nominated for the "Gouden Televizierster Man" for best male television personality and Voetbal International was nominated for best television program. On 21 October 2011, Johan Derksen lost to Jeroen van Koningsbrugge but Voetbal Inside won the "Gouden Televizierring".
