= René van der Gijp =

Dutch footballer

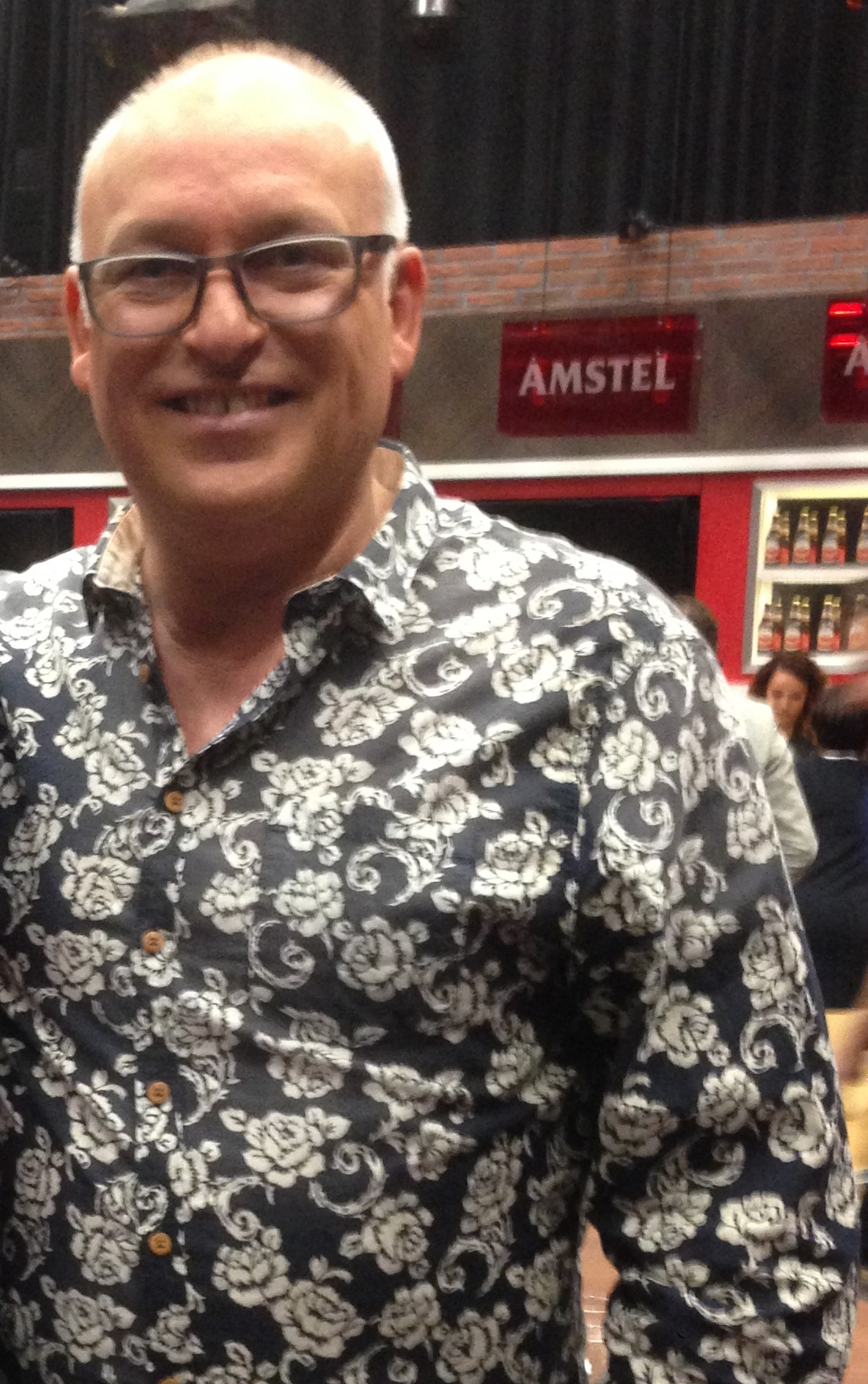
- Van der Gijp in 2015

Personal information
- Date of birth: 4 April 1961 (age 65)
- Place of birth: Dordrecht, Netherlands
- Height: 1.86 m (6 ft 1 in)
- Position: Winger

Youth career
- DFC
- 1975–1976: Feyenoord
- 1976–1978: Sparta Rotterdam

Senior career*
Years	Team	Apps	(Gls)
1978–1982	Sparta Rotterdam	83	(29)
1982–1984	Lokeren	66	(18)
1984–1987	PSV	83	(43)
1987–1988	Neuchâtel Xamax	19	(6)
1988–1989	Aarau	36	(9)
1989–1990	Sparta Rotterdam	17	(0)
1990–1992	Heerenveen	32	(6)
Total		336	(111)

International career
1980–1982	Netherlands U21	13	(5)
1982–1987	Netherlands	15	(2)
- * Club domestic league appearances and goals

René van der Gijp (born 4 April 1961) is a Dutch former professional footballer who played as a right winger for Sparta Rotterdam, Lokeren, PSV, Neuchâtel Xamax, Aarau and Heerenveen, as well as for the Netherlands national team. Since retiring from football in 1992, he has worked as a sports pundit and commentator.

The son of former footballer Wim and nephew of Cor, van der Gijp was born in Dordrecht and began his senior career with Sparta Rotterdam in 1978. During his career, where his best period was in the mid-1980s for PSV, he gained 15 caps for the Netherlands national team in which he scored two goals.

After ending his playing career, van der Gijp became known on television as a co-host in the football talk show Voetbal Inside (later Veronica Inside). His contribution to the program earned him a nomination for the "Televizier Talent Award" in 2010. The biographies Gijp (2012) and De wereld volgens Gijp (2016) were bestsellers and were awarded the "NS Publieksprijs" (NS Audience Award).

== Football career ==
=== Club career ===
Born in Dordrecht, van der Gijp started playing football at local side DFC. In 1975, he started playing in the Feyenoord youth academy with the likes of Hans Kraay Jr. After a year, however, he was sent away from Feyenoord and moved to Sparta Rotterdam on the advice of Hans Kraay Sr. Two years later, van der Gijp made his debut in the first team, which counted players such as Louis van Gaal, Arie van Staveren, Luuk Balkestein, Adri van Tiggelen, Danny Blind, Ruud Geels, Ronald Lengkeek, Gerard van der Lem, Geert Meijer, Dick Advocaat and David Loggie.

After four seasons, in 1982, van der Gijp left Sparta joined Lokeren in Belgium. There, he made his first European appearances in his first season. He managed to score twice in four UEFA Cup matches.

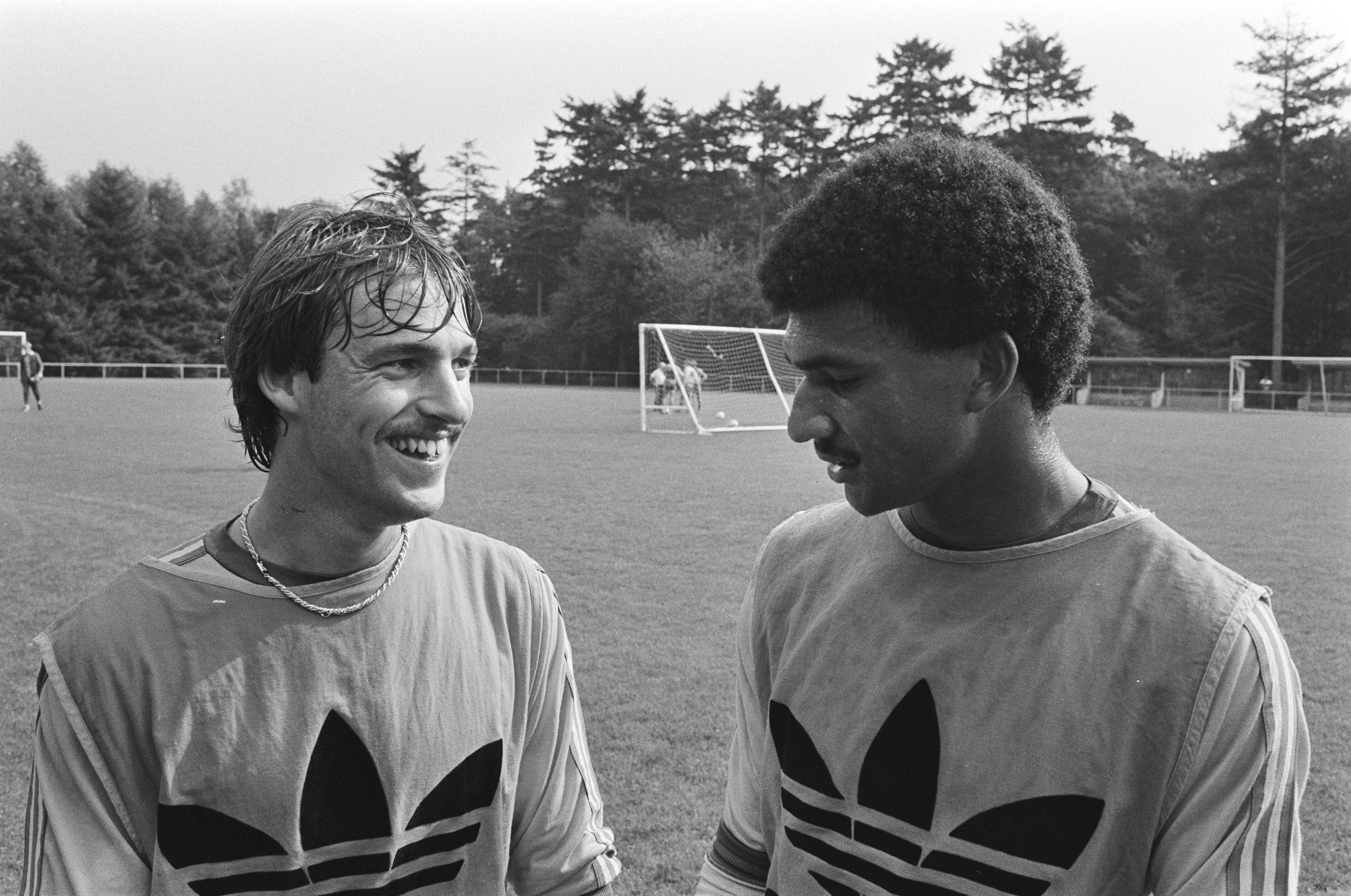
Van der Gijp and Ruud Gullit for the Netherlands (1982).

After two and a half seasons, van der Gijp returned to the Netherlands in November 1984 to play for PSV. At the Eindhoven-based club, van der Gijp experienced the most successful years of his career, in which he became Dutch champions twice and scored more than forty goals. On 1 July 1987, van der Gijp left PSV, where he had played together with Ernie Brandts, Hallvar Thoresen, Glenn Hysén, Kenneth Brylle, Ruud Gullit, Frank Arnesen, Gerald Vanenburg and Ronald Koeman. His new club became the Swiss Neuchâtel Xamax coached by Gilbert Gress. Club management had assumed that van der Gijp was a striker with strong heading abilities, while he had in reality never played that position. Nevertheless, Neuchâtel Xamax became Swiss champions with van der Gijp in the team and also won the Swiss Super Cup twice. In Switzerland, he played another season and a half for FC Aarau, before returning to his former club Sparta.

After half a season with the Rotterdam team, he played the last two years of his career for SC Heerenveen, where he retired in 1992.

=== International career ===
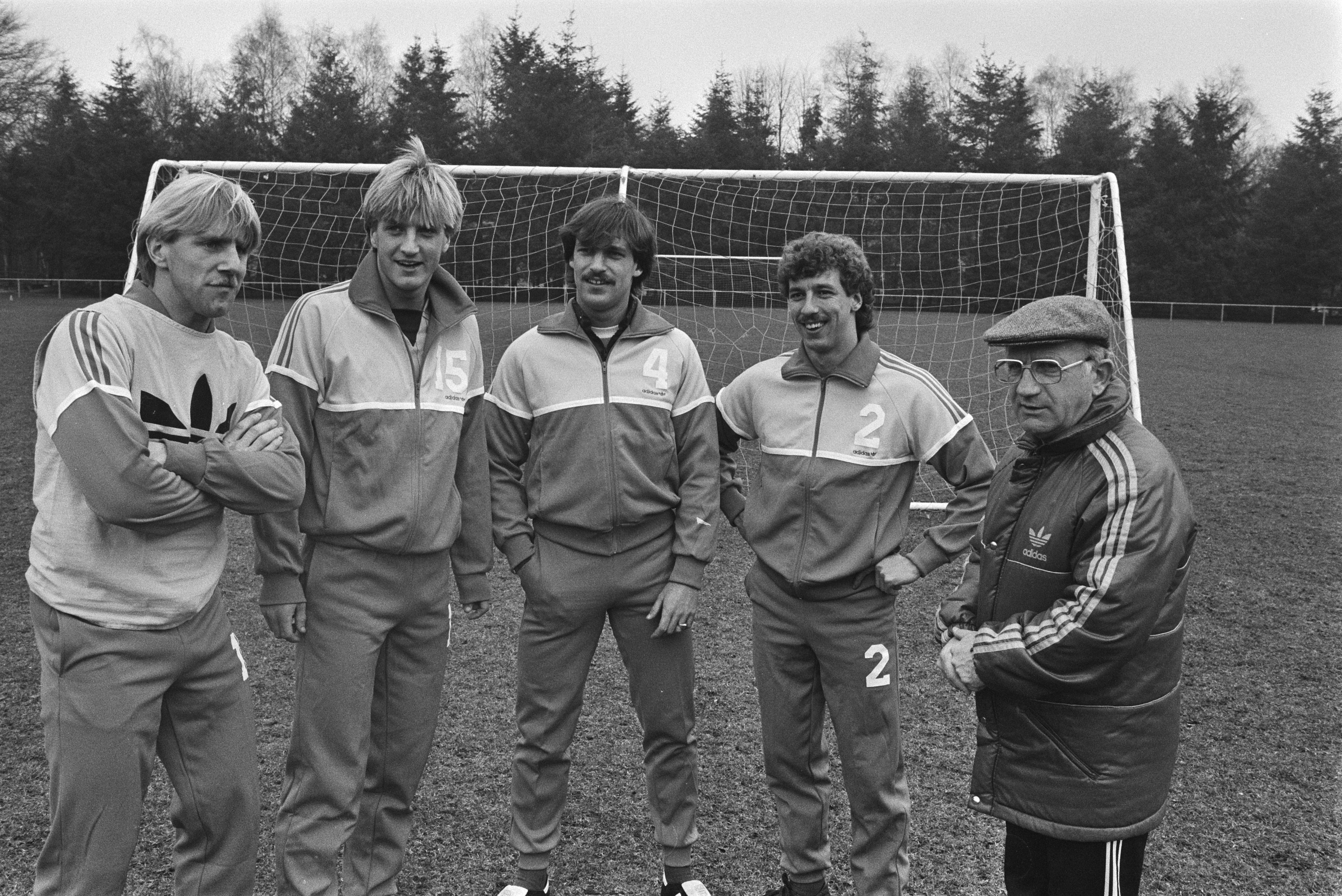
From left to right: Hoekstra, Kieft, Van der Gijp, Holverda and Rijvers (1984).

In 1982, van der Gijp was first called up for the Netherlands national team by then national team coach Kees Rijvers. He made his international debut on 22 September 1982, in a UEFA Euro 1984 qualifying match at home against Republic of Ireland (2–1). Van der Gijp thus became the second Oranje international in history whose father also played in the Dutch national team. He would eventually play fifteen international matches in which he scored two goals, both scored in a friendly against Denmark (6–0). For the Netherlands, van der Gijp played mostly together with Ruud Gullit, Hans van Breukelen, Ronald Spelbos, Frank Rijkaard, Ben Wijnstekers, Marco van Basten, Sonny Silooy, Peter Boeve, Willy van de Kerkhof and Adri van Tiggelen. René became the third Van der Gijp to play for the Dutch national team. Both his uncle Cor van der Gijp and his father Wim van der Gijp wore the Orange jersey. René van der Gijp is often referred to the fact that he has not been able to get the most out of his career. Experts believe that he could have played more international matches with his talent and perhaps could have started working for a European top club. However, he himself questions this.

== Media career ==
Van der Gijp, who during his football career was known for jokes made with the public and opponents, went into media after his playing career. In 1995, he made a parody about spiritual medium Jomanda, who at the time was subject of a media circus. The song "Give me hope Jomanda", a cover of "Gimme Hope Jo'anna" by Eddy Grant, reached number 21 in the Mega Top 50 and number 28 in the Top 40. Van der Gijp also made a new variant of "Het busje komt zo" (The bus comes soon) by Höllenboer, called "M'n zusje komt zo" (My sister comes soon). The song went number one in Suriname for some time. He also made the carnival song "In ons klein café" (In our small café) together with his good friend Mario Been under the name Koek en Zopie.

Van der Gijp has mostly become famous in popular football talk show Voetbal Inside, now Veronica Inside (VI). Since 2008, he formed a regular trio in the program with Johan Derksen and Wilfred Genee. Van der Gijp and Derksen have known each other since the early seventies, when Derksen as a player of SC Veendam regularly looked after the adolescent nephew of his coach Cor van der Gijp.

In 2010, Van der Gijp was nominated for the "Televizier Talent Award". Although he was in first place in the polls, the prize ultimately went to Jan Kooijman. In September 2011, Van der Gijp temporarily withdrew from VI after suffering from occupational burnout and panic attacks. During the same period, VI quite surprisingly won the Golden Televizier Ring. In early January 2012, Van der Gijp had recovered sufficiently from his psychological distress and he returned to the table at VI. In addition to the football talk show, he is regularly seen on television as an analyst at RTL 7 and Veronica TV.

On 2 September 2020, van der Gijp will perform with the theater show GIJP Live! in Rotterdam Ahoy.

=== Controversy ===
At the table, Van der Gijp, Derksen and Genee have frequently discussed current affairs in and outside football, describing themselves as "making fun of everyone with a good portion of 'football humor', satire and pub talk. This has caused controversy in the media several times, while regular VI viewers appreciate the jokes and statements.

In August 2013, Van der Gijp said in response to a Royal Dutch Football Association (KNVB) boat that was part of the Amsterdam Gay Pride: "Football is not a sport for gay men. If you're gay, you just go and work in a barber shop." Johan Boskamp was also negative about this subject. The KNVB and various famous Dutch people reacted furiously to these statements. In response to the statements of van der Gijp and Boskamp, the program devoted attention to gay acceptance on the football field. Before that, the gay former professional footballer John de Bever and singer Gerard Joling had been invited to the studio.

At the beginning of February 2018, Derksen and van der Gijp made jokes about the Belgian journalist and author Bo Van Spilbeeck who had recently come out as transgender. Van der Gijp said before the last commercial break that from now on he would go through life as "Renate van der Gijp". After the commercial, he was wearing a dress and a wig. This sparked loud laughter in the studio. Derksen called transgender people "not normal". The screening elicited many negative reactions, including from social organisations, political parties and well-known Dutch people. Interest groups Transgender Netwerk Nederland and COC Nederland called the joke "sad" and again called for a sponsor boycott. Despite the negative reactions, van der Gijp also received a lot of support from loyal VI viewers. In the next broadcast, van der Gijp responded to the commotion: "Well, I do not have anything against gays, transgender people or lesbians. I don't care about what they do. Our viewers know very well when it was a joke; our viewers are not complete idiots. We have gone completely crazy in this country".

=== Books ===
Van der Gijp was a columnist for the football magazine Voetbal International for many years. In the summer of 2012, the book Gijp was published. In the book, written by Michel van Egmond, both the football and TV career of van der Gijp is explored, as well as digging deeper into the occupational burnout which kept him away from the public eye during large parts of 2011. In total, more than 350,000 copies were sold, which meant that it ended in first place in "De Bestseller 60" list for seven weeks and was the fourth best-selling Dutch book of that year. On 15 October 2013, it won the "NS Publieksprijs" (NS Audience Award) in a TV broadcast of De Wereld Draait Door. Michel van Egmond received, in the presence of van der Gijp, a sculpture by artist Jeroen Henneman, a cash prize of €7,500 and a first-class annual subscription from the Nederlandse Spoorwegen. The follow-up book De wereld volgens Gijp (2016) also became a bestseller and was also awarded the NS Audience Award.

== Personal life ==
Van der Gijp was married from 1988 until 1995 to Jacqueline Laats, the mother of his first son, Sanny (born 1990). In 2014, Laats published a book about their marriage called Voorgoed genezen van René van der Gijp ("Cured for good from René van der Gijp"). In the book, the ex-wife describes her turbulent marriage to van der Gijp in which she claims to have been mentally and physically abused. Van der Gijp did not respond in-depth to the allegations.

After his marriage, van der Gijp was in a LAT relationship with Daniëlle Sijthoff, the daughter of former cyclist Theo Sijthoff, who died in 2006. They had one child, Nicky (born 2001). In March 2016, Daniëlle Sijthoff died at the age of 46.

On 27 April 2020, the night of Koningsdag, van der Gijp was attacked in front of his home in Dordrecht by three men dressed in black with white masks and equipped with hammers, after he had arrived home from a live broadcast of Veronica Inside. The perpetrators were unable to cause him any harm due to the bulletproof glass in his car. Two months before the robbery, van der Gijp's home was broken into. He reacted quite laconic about this at the time. Van der Gijp called the police, as well as his son to tell him to stay inside and drove around until the police arrived. The police since stated that they would address the issue, and the mayor of Dordrecht also took this situation very seriously. Van der Gijp hired extra security guards after the incident.

Van der Gijp married Minouche de Jong on 16 July 2020.

== Career statistics ==
=== International ===
Appearances and goals by national team and year
National team	Year	Apps	Goals
Netherlands	1982	2	0
Netherlands	1983	2	0
Netherlands	1984	4	2
Netherlands	1985	2	0
Netherlands	1986	2	0
Netherlands	1987	3	0
Total		15	2

Scores and results list the Netherlands' goal tally first, score column indicates score after each Van der Gijp goal.

List of international goals scored by René van der Gijp
No.	Date	Venue	Opponent	Score	Result	Competition
1	14 March 1984	De Meer Stadion, Amsterdam, Netherlands	Denmark	2–0	6–0	Friendly
2	14 March 1984	De Meer Stadion, Amsterdam, Netherlands	Denmark	6–0	6–0	Friendly

== Honours ==
PSV

- Eredivisie: 1985–86, 1986–87

Neuchâtel Xamax

- Nationalliga A: 1987–88
- Swiss Super Cup: 1987

== Awards and nominations ==
Year	Award	Category	Title	Result
2010	Televizier-Ring	Talent Award	Voetbal Inside	Nominated
2011	Televizier-Ring	Best Program	Voetbal Inside	Won
2013	NS Publieksprijs	Book of the Year	Gijp, Michel van Egmond	Won
2017	NS Publieksprijs	Book of the Year	De wereld volgens Gijp, Michel van Egmond	Won
2017	Gouden Mossel	Important resident	Veel betekend voor de stad Rotterdam	Won
