= Grolloo =

- Village
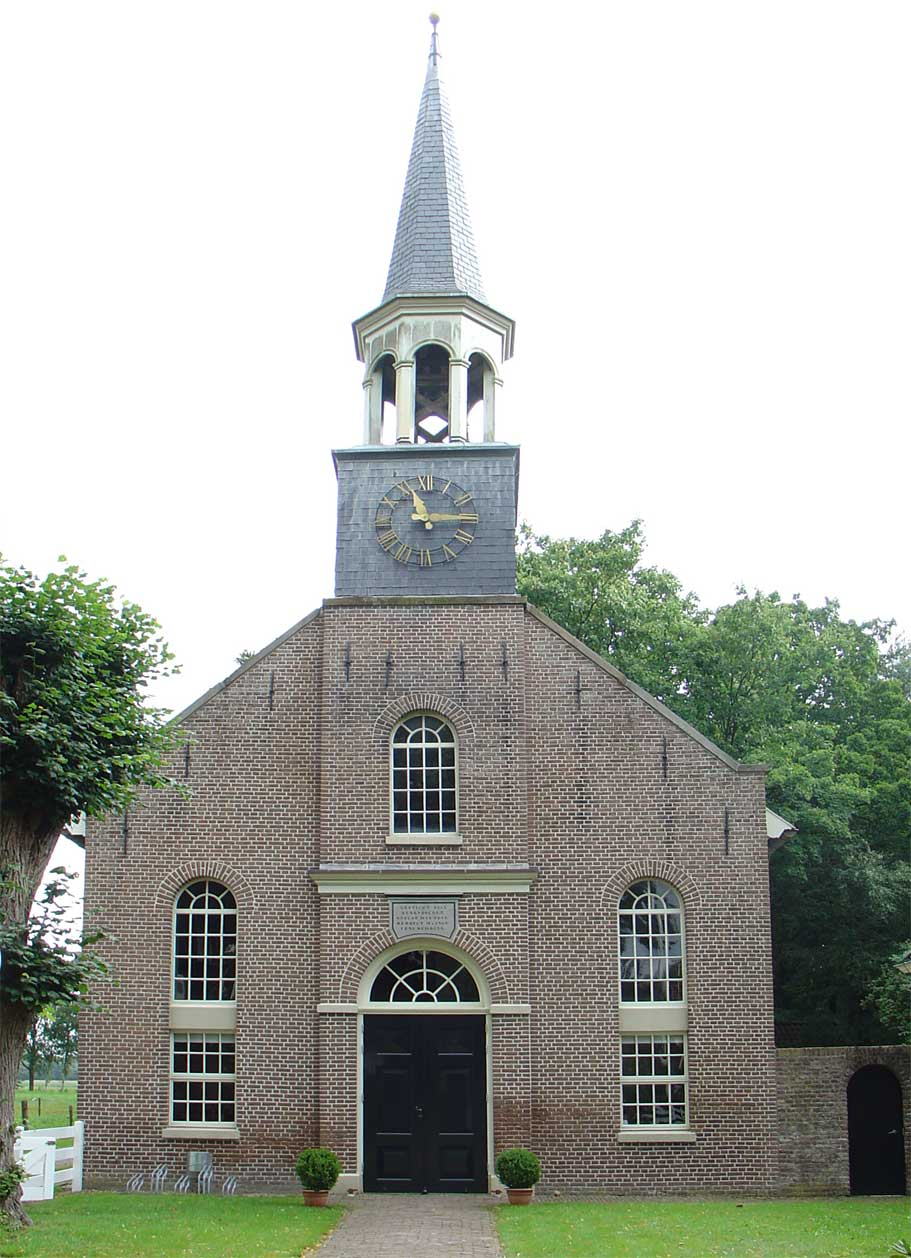
- Church of Grolloo

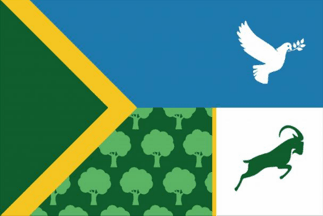
- Flag

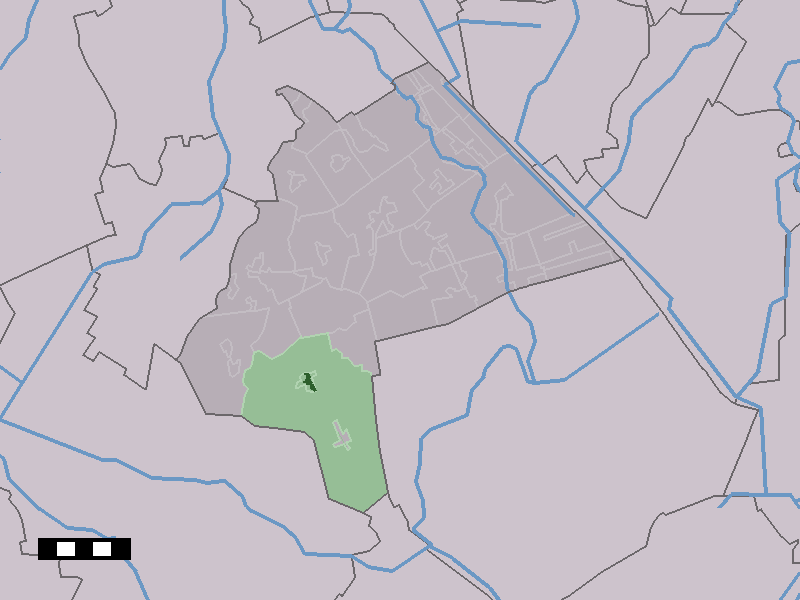
- The village centre (dark green) and the statistical district (light green) of Grolloo in the municipality of Aa en Hunze.

- Location in the Netherlands Grolloo (Netherlands)
- Coordinates: 52°56′7″N 6°40′16″E
- Country: Netherlands
- Province: Drenthe
- Municipality: Aa en Hunze

Area
  - Total: 45.56 km^{2} (17.59 sq mi)
- Elevation: 18 m (59 ft)

Population (2021)
  - Total: 880
  - Density: 19/km^{2} (50/sq mi)
- Time zone: UTC+1 (CET)
  - Summer (DST): UTC+2 (CEST)
- Postal code: 9443 & 9444
- Dialing code: 0592

Grolloo is a village in the Dutch province of Drenthe. It is a part of the municipality of Aa en Hunze, and lies about 11 km southeast of Assen.

== History ==
The village was probably first mentioned in the 12th century as Grunlo, and means "green open forest". Grolloo is an esdorp which developed in the Early Middle Ages on the Hondsrug as a satellite of Rolde. The village has two essen (communal pastures) on the east-side and a little brink (village square). From 1550 until 1669, the Landdag (legislative assembly) of the province of Drenthe was held in Grollerholt, a forest near Grollo.

The Dutch Reformed church dates from 1853, and has a wooden tower with a needle spire. The tower contains a bell from 1422. The church was restored in 1975.

Grollo was home to 272 people in 1840. The village used to have communal land. The transition to private priority started late in 1859.

The Dutch blues band Cuby + Blizzards was founded in Grolloo. There is a museum in the small farm house where they began. Grolloo has a statue of Harry Muskee, one of the band's founders and lead singer.

== Gallery ==
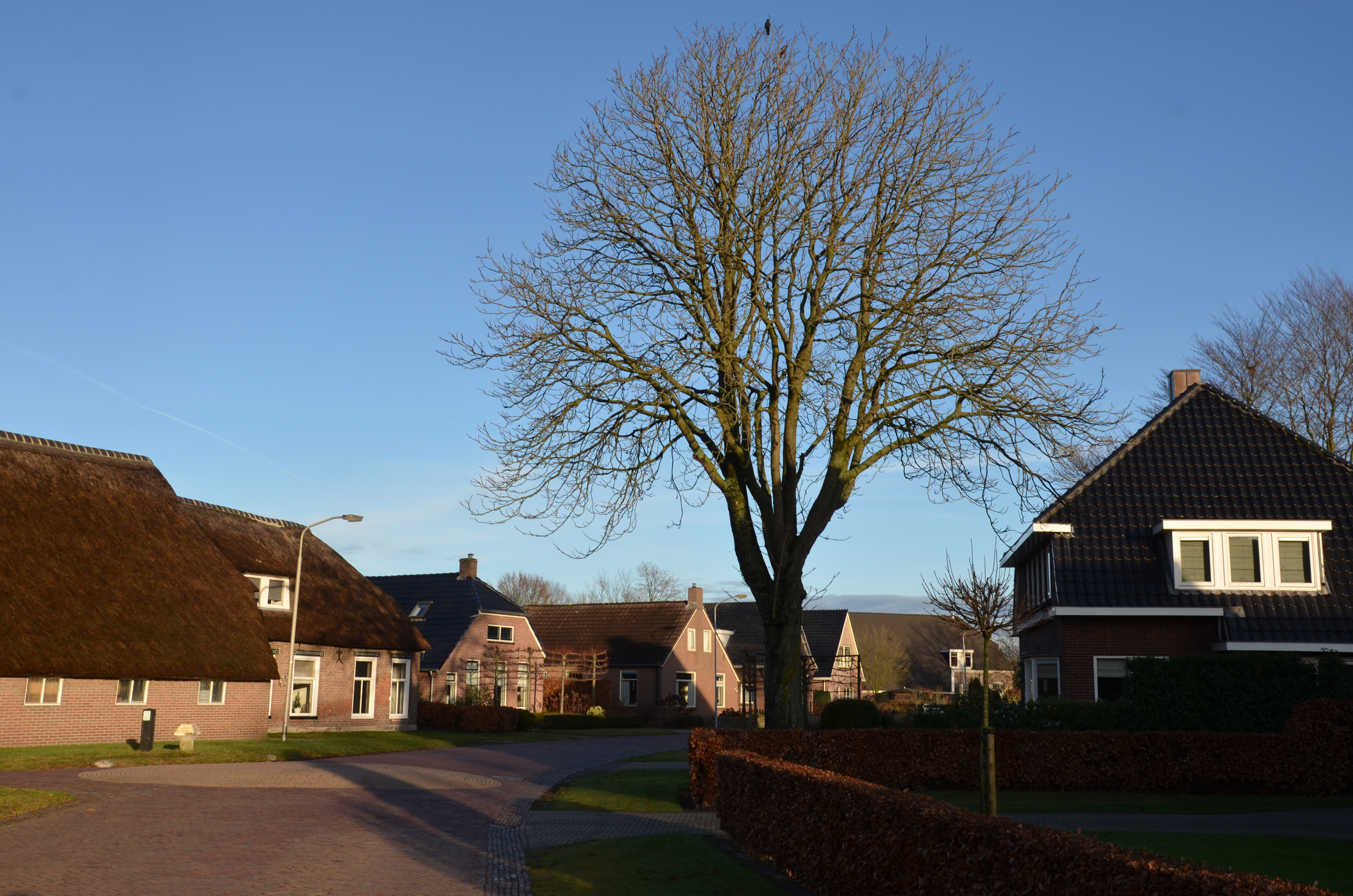
View on Grolloo

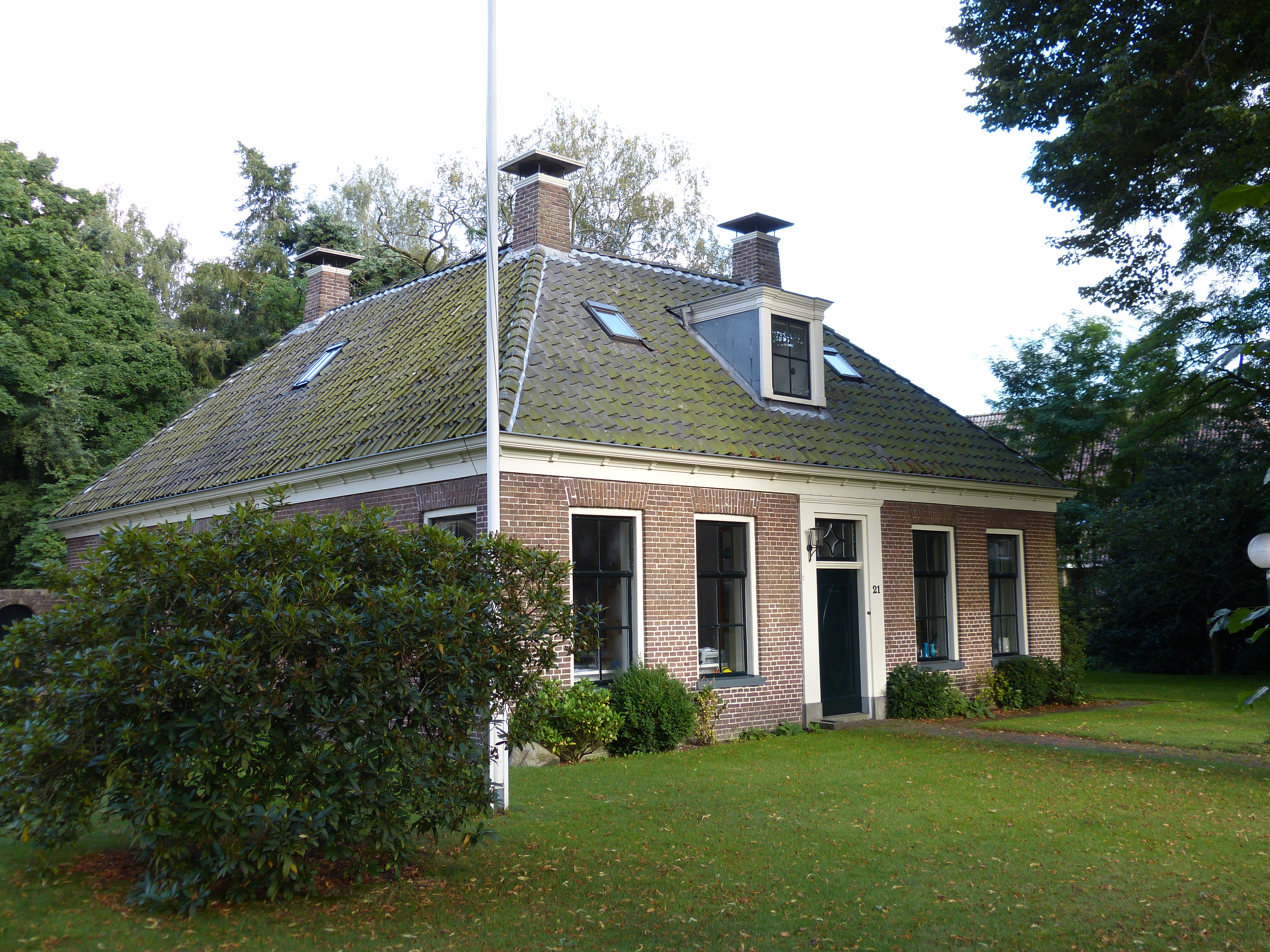
Former clergy house

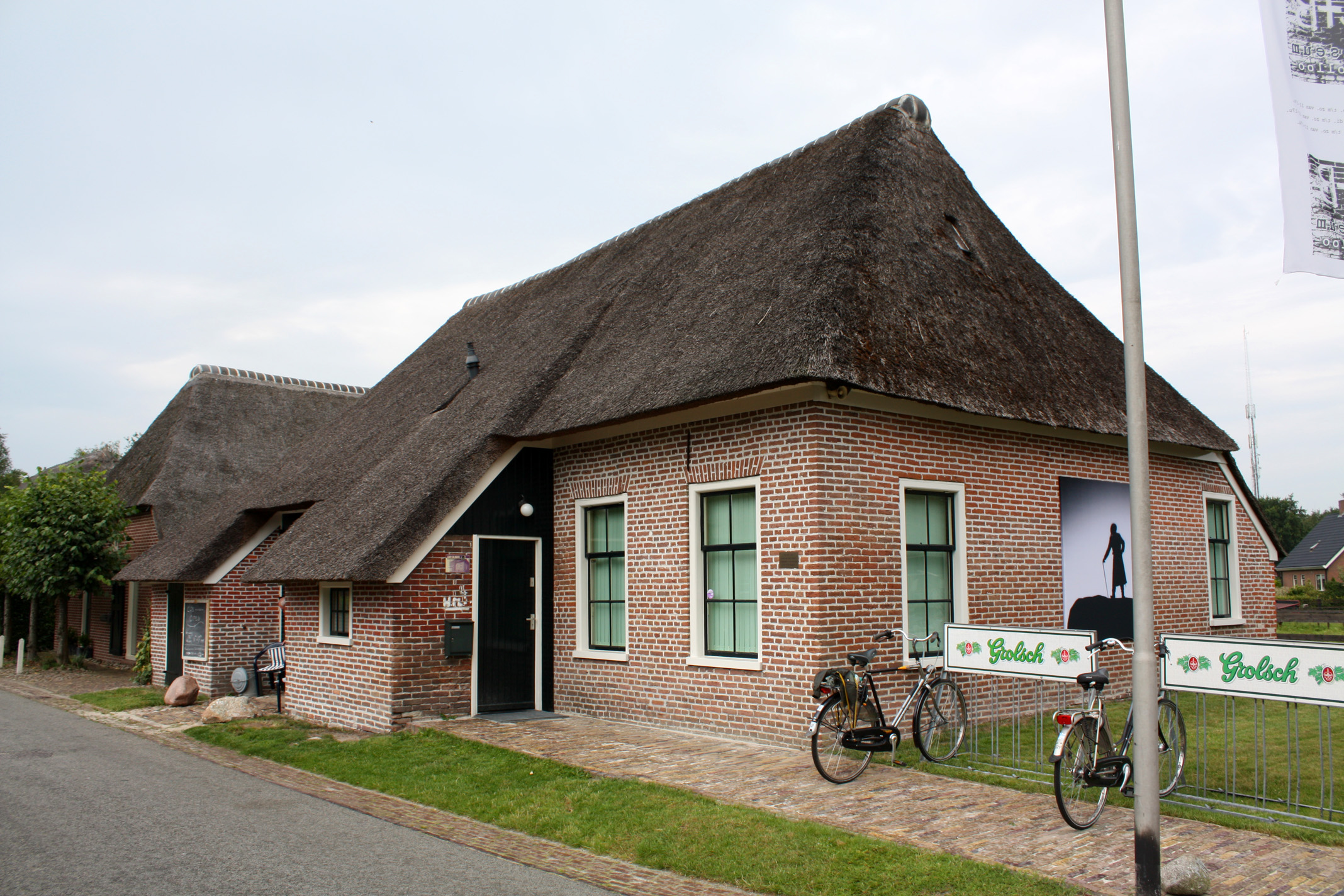
Cuby + Blizzards museum

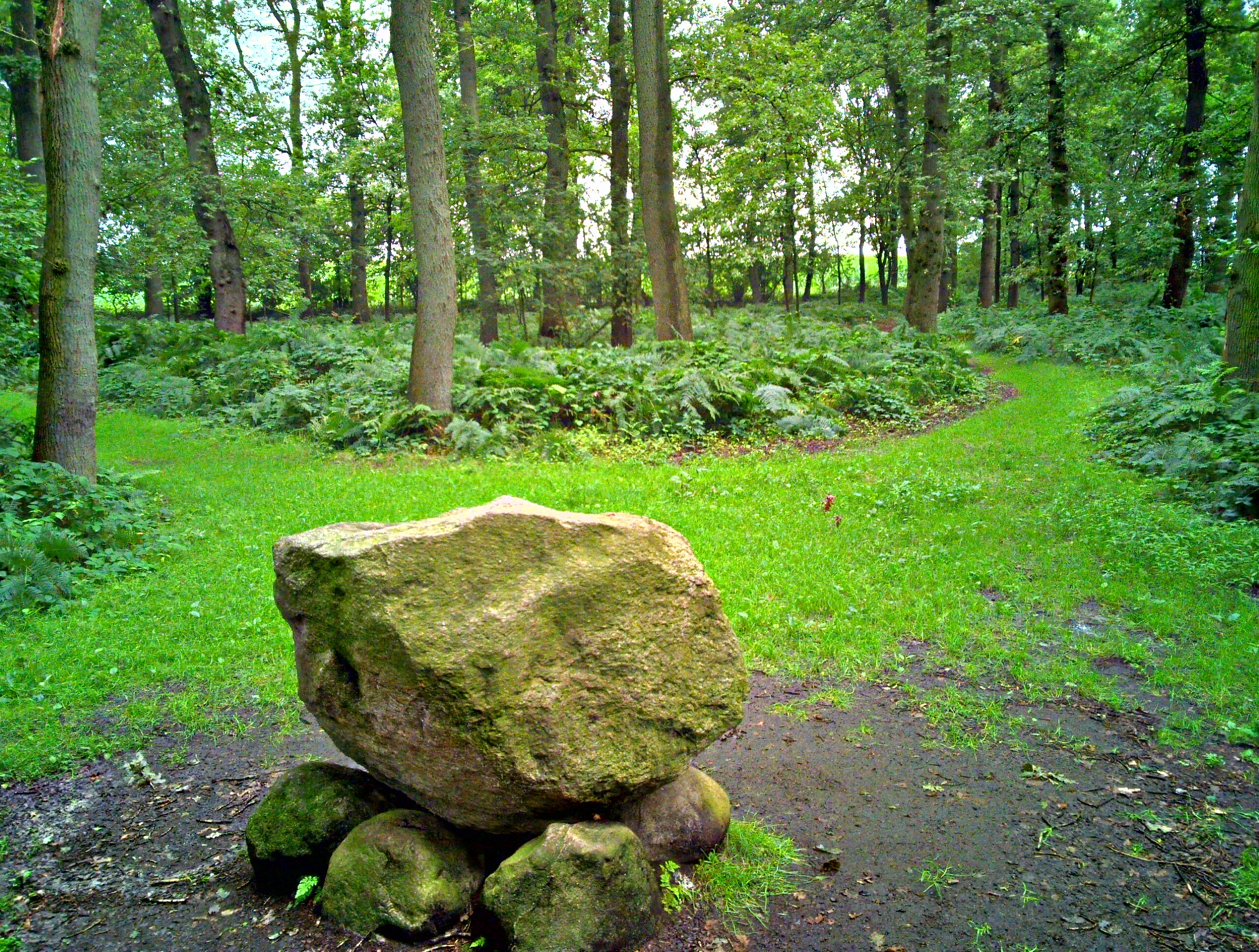
Grollerholt. Location of the landdag of Drenthe
