= Hanneke Kappen =

Dutch singer and radio/TV presenter (b. 1954)

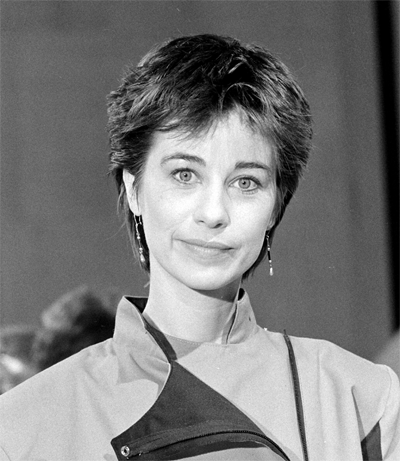
- Kappen in 1983
- Born: 1954 (age 71–72)
- Years active: 1978–present
- Known for: White Honey, Stampij
- Website: http://www.hannekekappen.nl/

Hanneke Kappen (born 1954) is a Dutch singer and radio and TV presenter. Kappen started a musical career by singing in a rock band in the late 1970s during the zenith of the Groningen music scene, but became a radio presenter and from 1981 to 1982 had a weekly show that focused on heavy metal music, only the second such show on Dutch radio. She then moved on to television, presenting programs for a number of public broadcasters. She returned to radio in 1999, while continuing to play and record music.

== Biography ==
Hanneke Kappen was attending art school when she became a singer for the rock band White Honey from Groningen, with, among others, Erwin Java. This happened at the height of what was later called "the Groninger springtij" (the "Groningen spring tide"), a period when the music scene in Groningen was very lively, and many local acts were propelled to the national stage, including Herman Brood, who picked up Java, the band's guitarist. The group had a minor hit with "Nothing Going On In The City" but disbanded in 1980, just after releasing their first and only album. Kappen continued playing music, including jazz (with her brother, and with guitarist Winfred Buma).

Kappen moved into radio, and from 1981 to 1982 presented the radio program Stampij for the public broadcaster KRO, playing heavy metal and hard rock music. This was only the second Dutch radio program (after the VARA's Betonuur, with Alfred Lagarde, 1976–1982) oriented toward heavy metal. After Stampij she moved to television and presented a number of shows for the VARA, including Wereldwijs, Je ziet maar, and Vroege Vogels. Along with Boudewijn Büch she hosted the Dutch live broadcast of Live Aid in 1985. In 1989 she presented the Kinderen voor Kinderen festival, and that same year presented a show, Avonduur met Kappen, that she herself had pitched to the VARA. For Teleac, an educational broadcaster, she presented Werken aan Werk, and the educational program Plein 1. In 1999 she returned to radio and took over presenting the Sunday morning show Dag Zondag for the NPS. By that time she was a mother of two and spent a lot of time travelling; besides her radio and TV work, she had started a study in communication, hosted conferences and symposiums, and was doing promotional work for the city of Groningen as well as the province. She also played music, in a duo called "Kappen & Klat" with Boelo Klat. She has continued to be active as a musician; in 2005 and 2006 she sang on a CD for the Eastgate project of composer Gerard Ammerlaan and performed with his band, and later formed a duo with guitarist Winfred Buma.

== Discography ==
Source: Poparchief Groninger

- Some Kinda Woman (White Honey, 1979)
- Human Electrics (with Gerry Arling, 1989)
- State of Soul (with Gerry Arling, 1991)
- Klatwerk (with Boelo Klat, 1994)
- Kappen & Klat (with Boelo Klat, 1997/2004)
- Alien Visitors (with Eastgate, 2005)
