= Harry Muskee =

Dutch blues singer

Harry "Cuby" Muskee
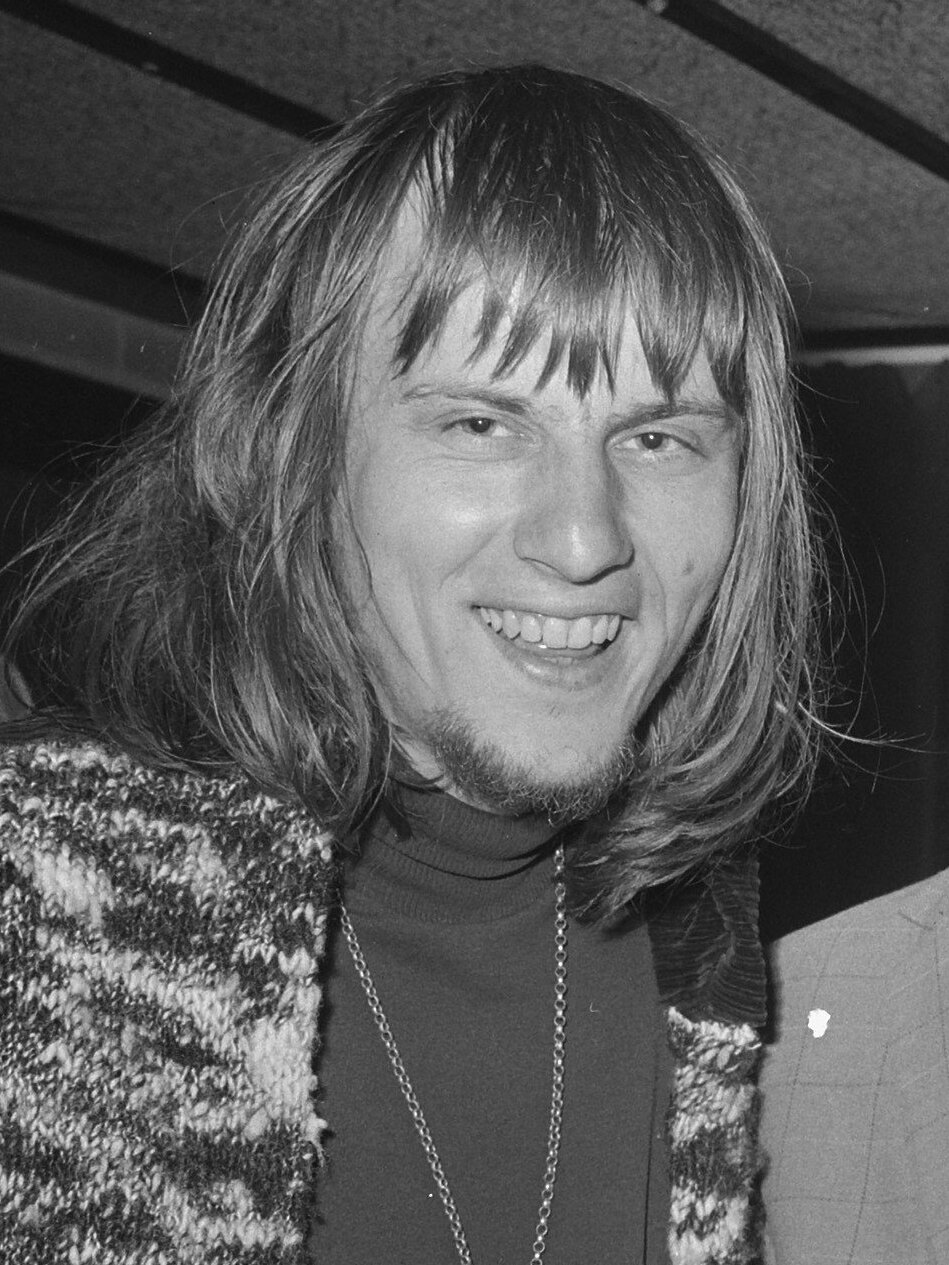
- Muskee in 1968

Background information
- Born: 10 June 1941; Assen, Netherlands
- Died: 26 September 2011 (aged 70) Rolde, Netherlands
- Genres: Blues
- Occupations: Singer-songwriter, musician
- Instrument: Vocals
- Years active: 1960s–2011

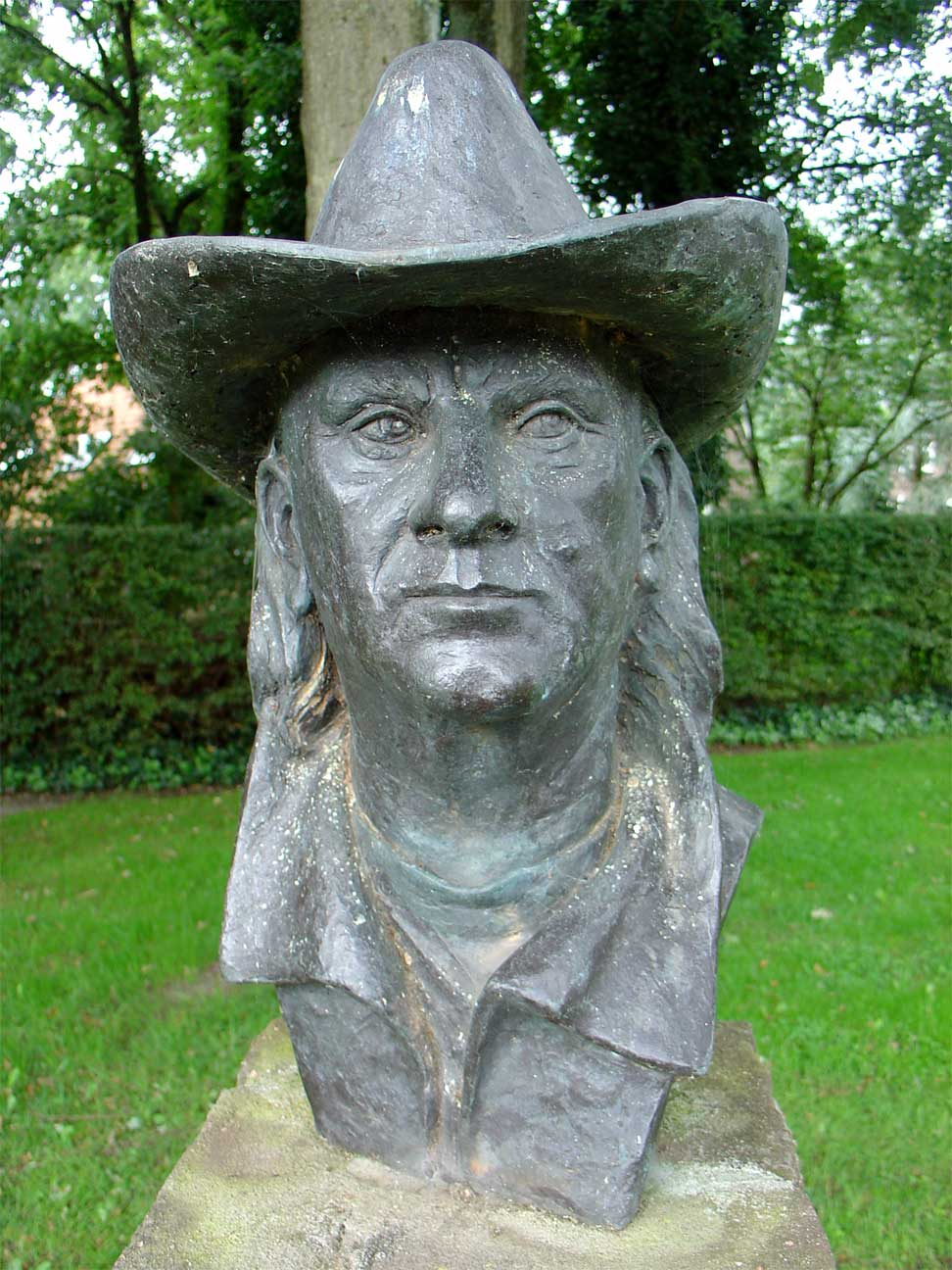
Bust of Harry Muskee in Grolloo

Harry "Cuby" Muskee (10 June 1941 – 26 September 2011) was the singer of the blues band Cuby + Blizzards, which he co-founded with Eelco Gelling. Muskee was born in Assen, and died in Rolde aged 70.

== Biography ==
Muskee was born in the Wilhelmina Hospital in Assen. Early on, he lived with his mother at his grandmother's place, because his father was captured and transported to Germany. Only after the war – when he was four years old - did he see his father for the first time. The family moved to Rotterdam, but returned to Assen after two years. His mother suffered from multiple sclerosis and could not properly care for her child. Because his father, a fire chief, was mostly away from home, his grandmother largely took care of Muskee.

At fifteen he went for his first guitar lessons. In high school he came into contact with jazz and Dixieland music. Together with the brothers Henk and Jaap Hilbrandie he founded the band The Mixtures. From this band emerged later on the 'Old Fashioned Jazz Group'. This band mostly played at school dances in Assen.

Through listening to the American Forces Network radio station – for U.S. soldiers stationed in Germany – Muskee came into contact with blues music. When he discovered the album Live at Newport by John Lee Hooker, he decided that he also wanted to make this kind of music. In 1961, when Muskee was 20 years old, his mother died, and a year later his grandmother died. Shortly afterwards, Muskee broke through with The Blizzards.

After the breakup of Cuby + Blizzards – in 1972 – he toured around with formations like Red White 'n' Blue, the Harry Muskee Band, the Muskee Gang and Muskee. Ultimately, the original name Cuby + Blizzards proved to be the most catchy and under this name, assisted by the Groningen guitarist Erwin Java (since 1986), Muskee toured for many years. In addition, he presented music programs on Radio Drenthe. For the same channel, he made a study tour through the southern states of the United States in search of the roots of the blues. A statue of Harry Muskee was placed in Grolloo, in 1997.

Muskee died in Rolde on 26 September 2011 of cancer. After his death, a special museum to honor Harry Muskee was opened in Grolloo.
