= Winschoter Courant =

Dutch newspaper

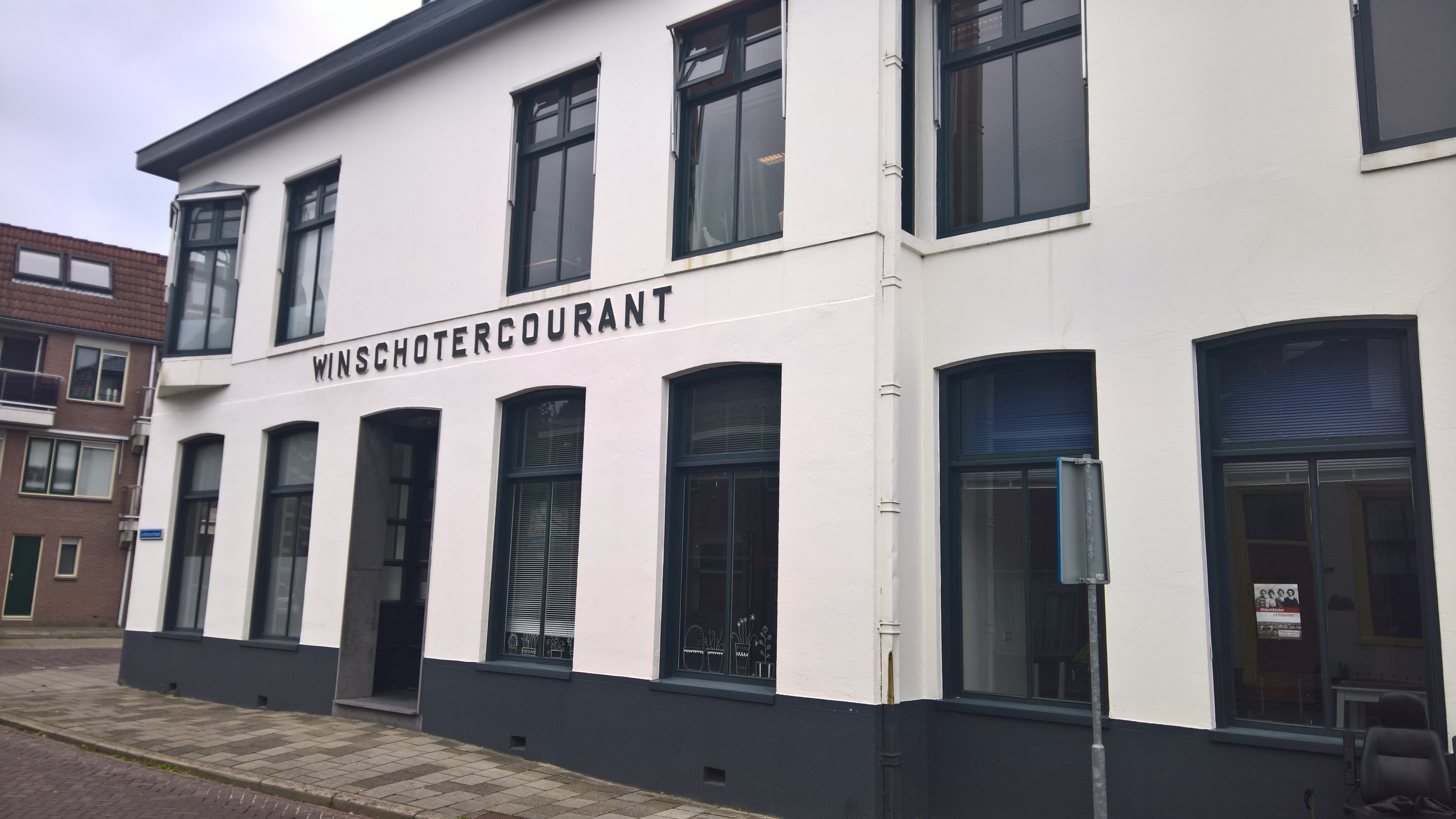
Building of the Winschoter Courant in 2017

The Winschoter Courant was a daily newspaper that was published until 1992 and was mainly read in the eastern part of the province of Groningen, with its editorial office and printing press located in Winschoten.

== History ==
The Winschoter Courant, founded in 1870, was known as an explicitly red (social-democratic) newspaper. It began in 1870 under the name Advertentieblad, was later called the Kleine Courant, and from 20 September 1873 continued under the title Winschoter Courant. From that year it was published twice a week, increasing to three times a week in 1885. From 1886 it became a daily newspaper, which lasted until 1908, when publication was reduced again to three times a week. On 1 January 1946, it once more became a true daily newspaper, appearing six days a week. In 1956, the newspaper's publisher J.D. van der Veen was taken over by Roel de Graaf, although the publisher's name remained unchanged. In 1963, a new sister paper was founded, De Kanaalstreek – Dagblad voor de Kanaalstreek, aimed at attracting subscribers in the Stadskanaal and Ter Apel region. In 1968, the Winschoter Courant became the first newspaper in the Netherlands to feature a colour photograph on its front page. That same year, the Oost-Groninger Dagblad was launched as another sister paper, targeting readers in Veendam and surrounding areas. In 1973, the daily newspaper De Noord-Ooster from Veendam was acquired and became a sister paper of the Winschoter Courant. At the same time, the title Oost-Groninger Dagblad disappeared after nearly six years. The publishing company remained independent until the 1970s.

== 1980s: Drents-Groningse Pers ==
From 1 December 1979, the publishing company J.D. van der Veen became part of Wegener, and from 1986 the name of the publishing company was officially changed to Drents-Groningse Pers of Wegener. The newspaper reached its highest circulation in the 1980s with more than 28,000 subscribers. On 13 April 1992, the Winschoter Courant (and its sister paper Dagblad Noord-Ooster) became a morning newspaper after research showed there was greater interest in that format than continuing as an afternoon paper. In the summer of 1992, the Winschoter Courant continued under the name Groninger Dagblad. This newspaper shared an editorial staff with the Drentse Courant. The Drentse Courant and Groninger Dagblad had the same layout and differed only on their regional pages.

== 1990s: Hazewinkel Pers ==
In 1995, the Drents-Groningse Pers was taken over by Hazewinkel Pers of Groningen, publisher of the Nieuwsblad van het Noorden. Because small classified advertisements appeared in all three newspapers, readers of the morning paper Groninger Dagblad had an advantage; readers of the afternoon papers Drentse Courant and Nieuwsblad van het Noorden often missed out. In 2002, the three newspapers appeared for the last time and merged to form the Dagblad van het Noorden, which remains the only regional daily newspaper in Groningen and Drenthe to this day. In 2009, the printing halls of the Winschoter Courant were demolished. The former headquarters still exists and now houses a social club. The Dagblad van het Noorden still maintains a local editorial office in Winschoten, located in an office building on the Venne in the city centre.

== Editors-in-chief ==
- 1901–1951 – Jan Timmer
- 1967–1972 – Simon van Wattum
- 1972–1984 – Johan Wilhelm Poppen
- 1984–1992 – George Vogelaar
