= Voetbal International =

Dutch football magazine

- Editor-in-Chief: Pieter Zwart, Freek Jansen
- Categories: Football magazines
- Frequency: Weekly
- Publisher: PXR
- Founded: 1965; 61 years ago
- Country: Netherlands
- Language: Dutch
- Website: www.vi.nl
- ISSN: 0042-7977

Voetbal International (VI) is a Dutch football magazine. It is the oldest Dutch football magazine that is still running.

== History and profile ==
Voetbal International was established in 1965. VI was one of the founding members of ESM. It left the group in 2007. Voetbal International was acquired in 2019 by the publishing house Digital Enterprises. The chief editors of the magazine are Pieter Zwart and Freek Jansen. The magazine has had a sharply declining circulation in recent years. The current total paid weekly circulation is 24,590 magazines.

In addition to the regular magazine that comes out every Wednesday, VI every summer publishes season previews before the start of the Dutch league season. For years they have made a guide for the Dutch season, including the fixture lists and information and statistics of every Eredivisie and Eerste Divisie team and its players. They have also issued season previews of the English, German, French, Belgian and Spanish competitions as well as for the Dutch Hoofdklasse, the highest amateur league.

== Weekly circulation of Voetbal International ==
Total paid targeted circulation according to HOI, Instituut voor Media Auditing and Nationaal Onderzoek Multimedia.

- 1970: 105,272
- 1985: 176,231
- 1990: 198,253
- 1995: 209,286
- 2000: 188,209
- 2011: 155,491
- 2016: 85,445
- 2020: 41,993
- 2022: 33,752
- 2023: 30,433
- 2024: 28,312
- 2025: 25,204
- 2026 Q1: 24,590

== Football yearbook ==
From 1978, VI had published a Dutch football yearbook every year, with a review of the Dutch professional leagues and their national football team as well as international tournaments. Since 2006 they publish the Brinvest Voetbaljaarboek.

== Television programme ==
Since 2008, a programme aired by RTL 7 (Netherlands) is called Voetbal International as well. The show was formerly known as Voetbal Insite, but had to be sponsored to assure its future. Since that moment, former football player René van der Gijp has been made a series regular, after Willem van Hanegem quit the job. Voetbal International's editor Johan Derksen has a permanent place as an analyser. The show is being broadcast every Monday and Friday evening at 20:30 during the football season and lasts ninety minutes.

On 21 October 2011, Voetbal International was awarded the 'Golden Television Ring 2011' for best television program of the year.

== Awards ==
=== VI Eredivisie Best Player of the Year ===
Voetbal International has been awarding the VI Eredivisie Best Player of the Year since 2016. The award is based on the magazine's ranking of the players' performance in the league.

Year	Player	Team	Ref
2015–16	(Netherlands) Vincent Janssen	AZ	
2016–17	(Denmark) Nicolai Jørgensen	Feyenoord	
2017–18	(Iran) Alireza Jahanbakhsh	AZ	
2018–19	(Morocco) Hakim Ziyech	Ajax	
2019–20	Not awarded as the league was terminated due to COVID-19 Pandemic.		
2020–21	(Netherlands) Riechedly Bazoer	Vitesse	
2021–22	(Netherlands) Cody Gakpo	PSV	

=== Player of the Century ===
At the end of 1999, the magazine elected Pele as the best footballer in the 20th century, after a voting between its readers.

The top 10 list is as follows :

Position	Player	Nationality
1.	Pelé	(Brazil)
2.	Johan Cruyff	(Netherlands)
3.	Diego Maradona	(Argentina)
4.	Alfredo Di Stéfano	(Argentina)
5.	Franz Beckenbauer	(Germany)
6.	Garrincha	(Brazil)
7.	Ferenc Puskas	(Hungary)
8.	Marco Van Basten	(Netherlands)
9.	George Best	(Northern Ireland)
10.	Eusebio	(Portugal)

=== Top 100 Footballers Of All Time ===
On 7 June 2017, the magazine elected Argentine Lionel Messi as the best footballer in history, after a voting that took place in order to rank the top 100 footballers of all time.

Messi won the poll earning the number one spot ahead of compatriot Diego Maradona and Dutch legend Johan Cruyff, that came second and third respectively.

The top 7 list is as follows :

Position	Player	Nationality
1.	Lionel Messi	(Argentina)
2.	Diego Maradona	(Argentina)
3.	Johan Cruyff	(Netherlands)
4.	Pelé	(Brazil)
5.	Alfredo Di Stéfano	(Argentina)
6.	Zinedine Zidane	(France)
7.	Ronaldo	(Brazil)

Other placings are listed as below:

Position	Player	Nationality
10.	Marco Van Basten	(Netherlands)
50.	Henri Coppens	(Belgium)
74.	Sandro Mazzola	(Italy)
75.	Dennis Bergkamp	(Netherlands)
83.	Dragan Dzajic	(Socialist Federal Republic of Yugoslavia)
84.	Frank Rijkaard	(Netherlands)
85.	Just Fontaine	(France)
86.	Paulo Roberto Falcao	(Brazil)
87.	Gigi Riva	(Italy)
88.	Arjen Robben	(Netherlands)
89.	Hugo Sanchez	(Mexico)
90.	Ruud Krol	(Netherlands)
91.	Ryan Giggs	(Wales)
95.	Leônidas	(Brazil)
96.	Neymar	(Brazil)
97.	Edwin van der Sar	(Netherlands)
