= Cuby + Blizzards =

Dutch blues group

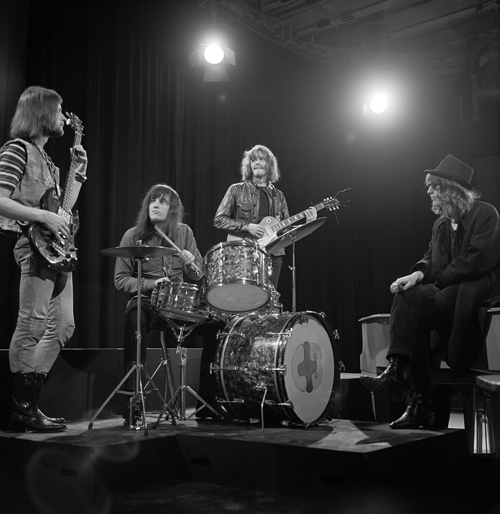
- Cuby + Blizzards performing for Dutch television in 1968

Background information
- Origin: The Netherlands
- Genres: Blues rock
- Years active: 1964–2011

Cuby + Blizzards, also known as Cuby & the Blizzards, were a blues rock group from the Netherlands, founded in 1964 by vocalist Harry Muskee and guitarist Eelco Gelling. During the 1960s, the band's mixture of sound, drawing upon a variety of genres which included blues and rock and roll, gave them a pioneering sound which was completely different from any other Dutch band in the same period. The spelling of the name varies, with 'Cuby' also written as 'QB' and the ampersand (&) also written as 'and' or '+' and the 'and' sometimes left out. The spelling 'Cuby + Blizzards' was used on the first albums.

== History ==
Cuby + Blizzards originated from the Drenthe village of Grolloo with members Harry Muskee (whose dog was called Cuby), Eelco Gelling, Nico Schröder and Hans Kinds. The band's first single, a blues-based track bearing similarities to The Pretty Things output, was "Stumble and Fall" in 1965. They had their first top 40 hit with "Back Home" in the Netherlands 1966. In 1967 they toured with Van Morrison (after he had left Them), recorded an album, Praise the Blues with U.S. blues musician Eddie Boyd and scored a top 10 hit with "Window of My Eyes". That year, John Mayall stayed at their farm and the next year they regularly played with the 'king of British blues' Alexis Korner, who is featured on their album Live in Düsseldorf (1968).

The line-up of the band changed regularly, but founders Harry Muskee and Eelco Gelling remained at the core of the band until 1976. Herman Brood was the pianist from early 1967 until mid-1969 (which kickstarted his career) and again in 1976. Also in 1976, Gelling left to join Golden Earring. Muskee then decided to drop the name C+B and to form the Harry Muskee Band. This band recorded one album before Muskee decided to leave the music business. In 1980 he formed the Muskee Gang with a line-up of Herman Deinum (bass guitar) and Hans la Faille (drums), who had both joined C+B in 1969, together with saxophonist Rudy van Dijk, Paul Smeenk (guitar) and Jeff Reynolds (trumpet).

Among the best known songs released by the band were "Another Day, Another Road", "Distant Smile", "Window of My Eyes" and "Appleknockers Flophouse".

In 1996 Cuby + Blizzards re-formed without Eelco Gelling, who was replaced by Erwin Java on guitar. In 2004 they went on a theater tour to honor John Lee Hooker. C+B came to an end when Harry Muskee died of cancer on 26 September 2011.

The band received an Edison award for their debut album Desolation. The song "Window of My Eyes" (a Top 10 hit in The Netherlands in 1968), was featured over the ending credits for the 2010 film The American.

Bassist Herman Deinum died on 5 December 2025, at the age of 79.

== Line-ups ==
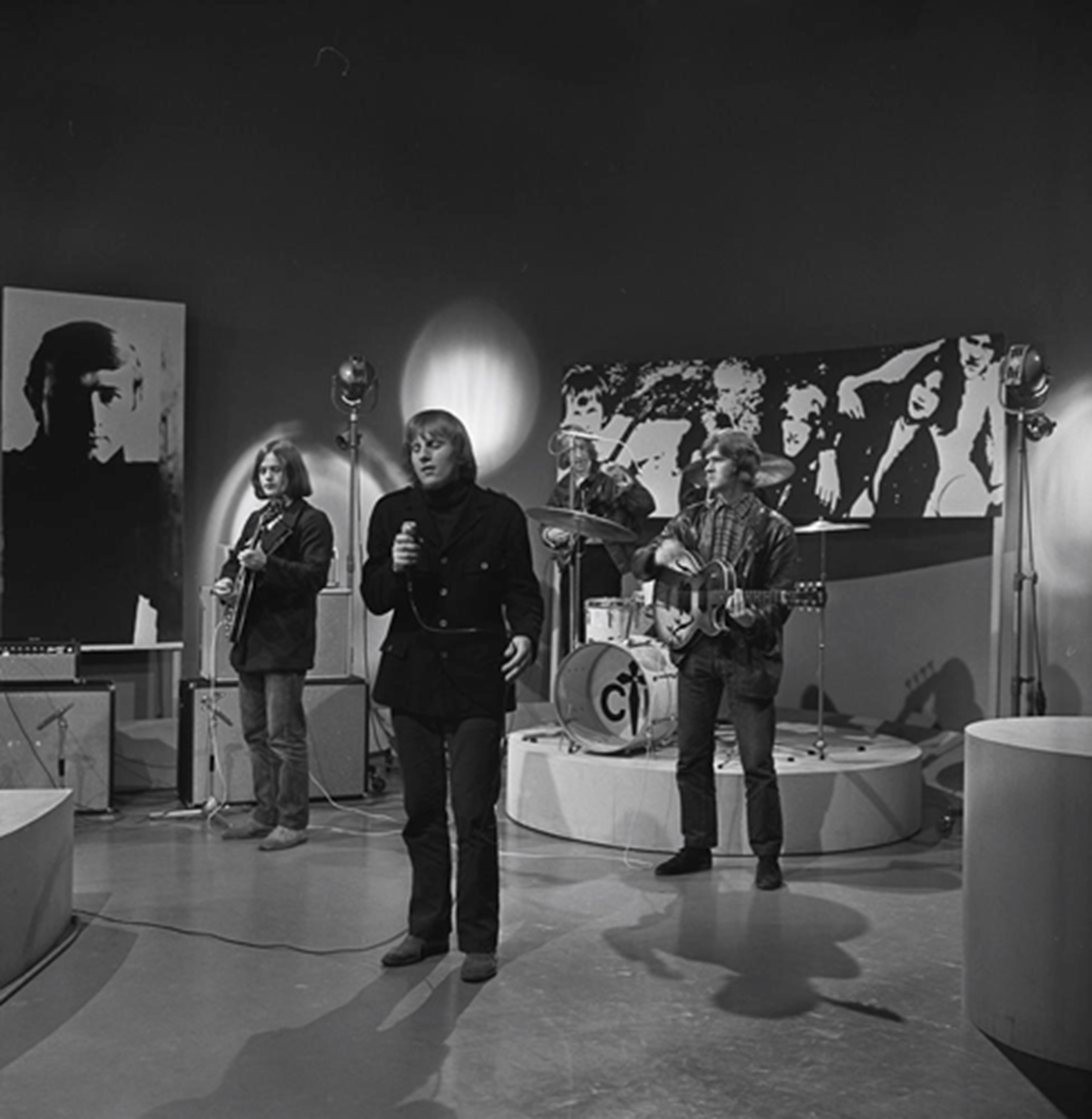
Cuby + Blizzards (Dutch TV, 1966)

Early line-up

- Harry "Cuby" Muskee, vocals
- Eelco Gelling, guitar
- Hans Kinds, guitar (replaced by Herman Brood, piano)
- Willy Middel, bass (replaced by Jaap van Eik)
- Hans Waterman, drums (replaced by Dick Beekman)

Late 1960s line-up

- Harry Muskee, vocals
- Eelco Gelling, guitar
- Herman Deinum, bass guitar
- Hans la Faille, drums
- Helmig van der Vegt, piano

1983 line-up

- Harry Muskee, vocals
- Rudy Van Dijk, tenor sax
- Paul Smeenk, guitar
- Herman Deinum, bass
- Hans Lafaille, drums
- Jeff Reynolds, trumpet

Reunion line-up 1996–2011

- Harry Muskee, vocals
- Erwin Java, guitar
- Herman Deinum, bass guitar
- Hans la Faille, drums
- Helmig van der Vegt, piano

== Discography ==
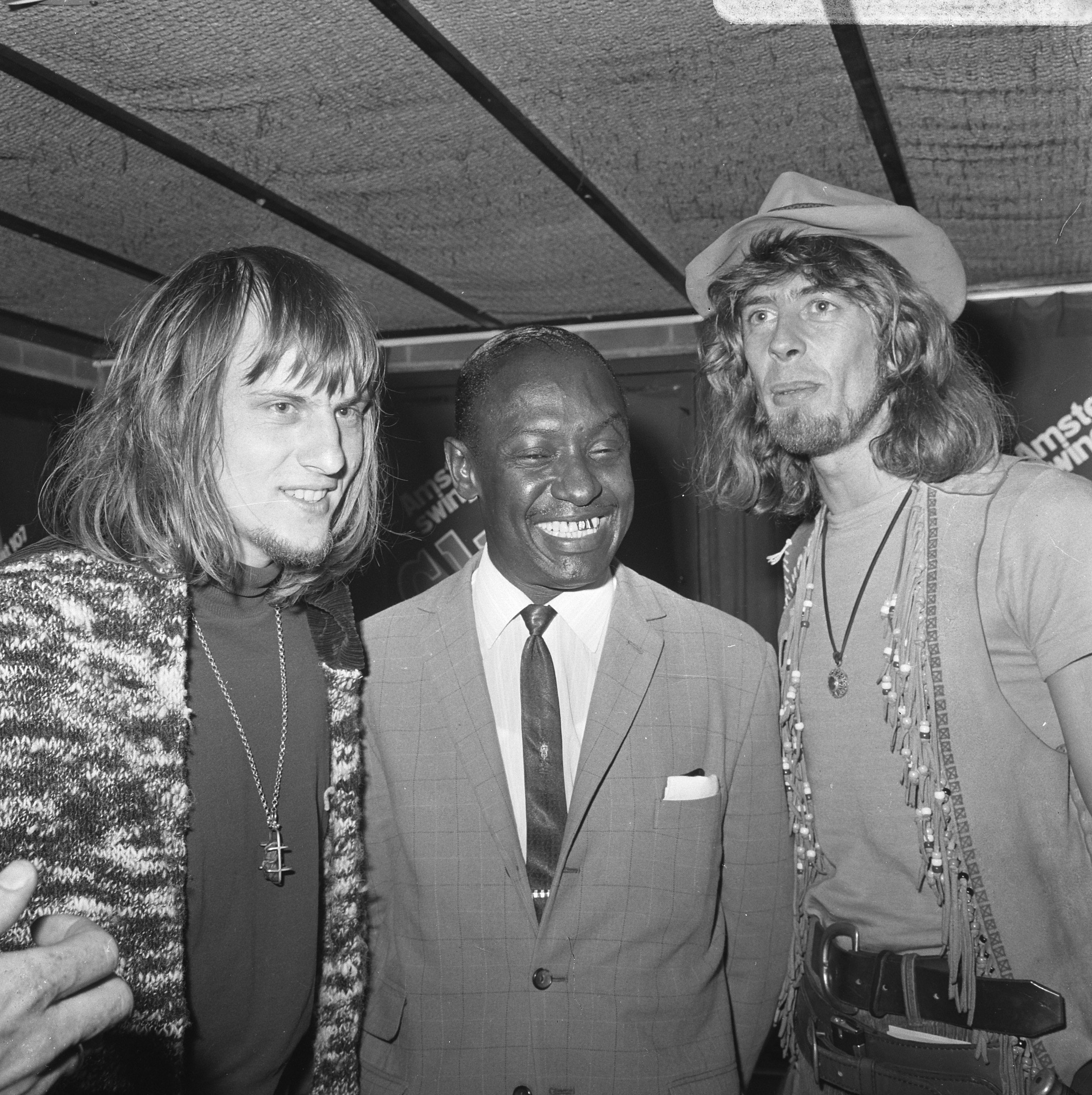
Harry Muskee together with Eddie Boyd and John Mayall

=== Albums ===
- Desolation (1966)
- Praise The Blues (with Eddie Boyd) (1967)
- Groeten Uit Grollo (1967)
- Trippin' Thru' A Midnight Blues (1968)
- Appleknockers Flophouse (1969)
- Too Blind To See (1970)
- Simple Man (1971)
- Sometimes (1972)
- Red White & Blue (1975)
- Kid Blue (1976)
- Forgotten Tapes (1979)
- Dancing Bear (1998)
- Hotel Grolloo (2000)
- Boom Boom Bang: In the Spirit of John Lee Hooker (2003)
- Cats Lost (2009)

=== Live albums ===
- Live '68 (1968)
- Afscheidsconcert (1974)
- Old Times, Good Times (1977)
- Live' Featuring Herman Brood Live (1979)
- Travelling with the Blues (1997)
- Live in het Oude Luxor (2005)
- Grollo Blues (2021)
