= Amsterdam Tournament =

Football tournament (1975–2009)

- Founded: 1975
- Abolished: 2009
- Region: Europe
- Teams: 4
- Last champions: Benfica (1st title)
- Most championships: Ajax (10 titles)
- Website: Official homepage

The Amsterdam Tournament (Dutch: Amsterdam Toernooi) was a pre-season association football competition, held in Amsterdam, Netherlands. The competition was hosted by Eredivisie club Ajax at the Amsterdam Arena. It was inaugurated in 1975 as the Amsterdam 700 Tournament to celebrate 700 years of history in the city. It was held annually each summer until 1992, when the last edition of the original tournament was played. It returned in 1999 with the backing of the International Event Partnership (IEP). Four teams participate in the competition, played in a league format since 1986.

Since its return, the tournament has used an unusual point scoring system. As with most league competitions, three points are awarded for a win, one for a draw and zero for a loss. An additional point, however, is awarded for each goal scored. The system is designed to reward teams that adopt a more attacking style of play. Each entrant plays two matches, with the winner being the club that finishes at the top of the table. The original competition was held at Amsterdam's Olympic Stadium, where Ajax played its international games until 1996. The Amsterdam Arena, now named the Johan Cruyff Arena, has played host to the event since the return until 2009.

The first winners were Belgian club Molenbeek, who defeated Ajax 5–2 in the final. The hosts are the most successful club in the tournament's history, having lifted the trophy on ten occasions. The club won their first title in 1978 and their most recent success came in 2004. Fellow Dutch side AZ and English club Arsenal are the only other teams to have won the competition more than once. Feyenoord, Ajax's domestic rivals, are among a group of clubs to have won the tournament once, while Belgium has produced the most individual winners, four, one more than England and Netherlands.

AZ and Arsenal are also the most regular guests, having been invited to compete in the tournament on six occasions. As well as being the most successful club, Ajax has finished as runners-up eleven times. Next in the list are two Italian clubs, Internazionale and Roma, who has finished in second place five times between them. Romania is the only national team to have taken part in the tournament. They were invited in 1984 and finished in fourth place as Atlético Mineiro became the first Brazilian club to lift the trophy. In total, teams from 13 countries have participated in the competition. The 2010 edition did not take place due to Ajax's involvement in the qualifying stages of the Champions League.

== Table key ==
- Argentina
- Belgium
- Brazil
- England
- Greece
- Italy
- Netherlands
- Portugal
- Romania
- / / Spain
- Turkey
- Soviet Union
- West Germany / Germany

== Tournaments ==
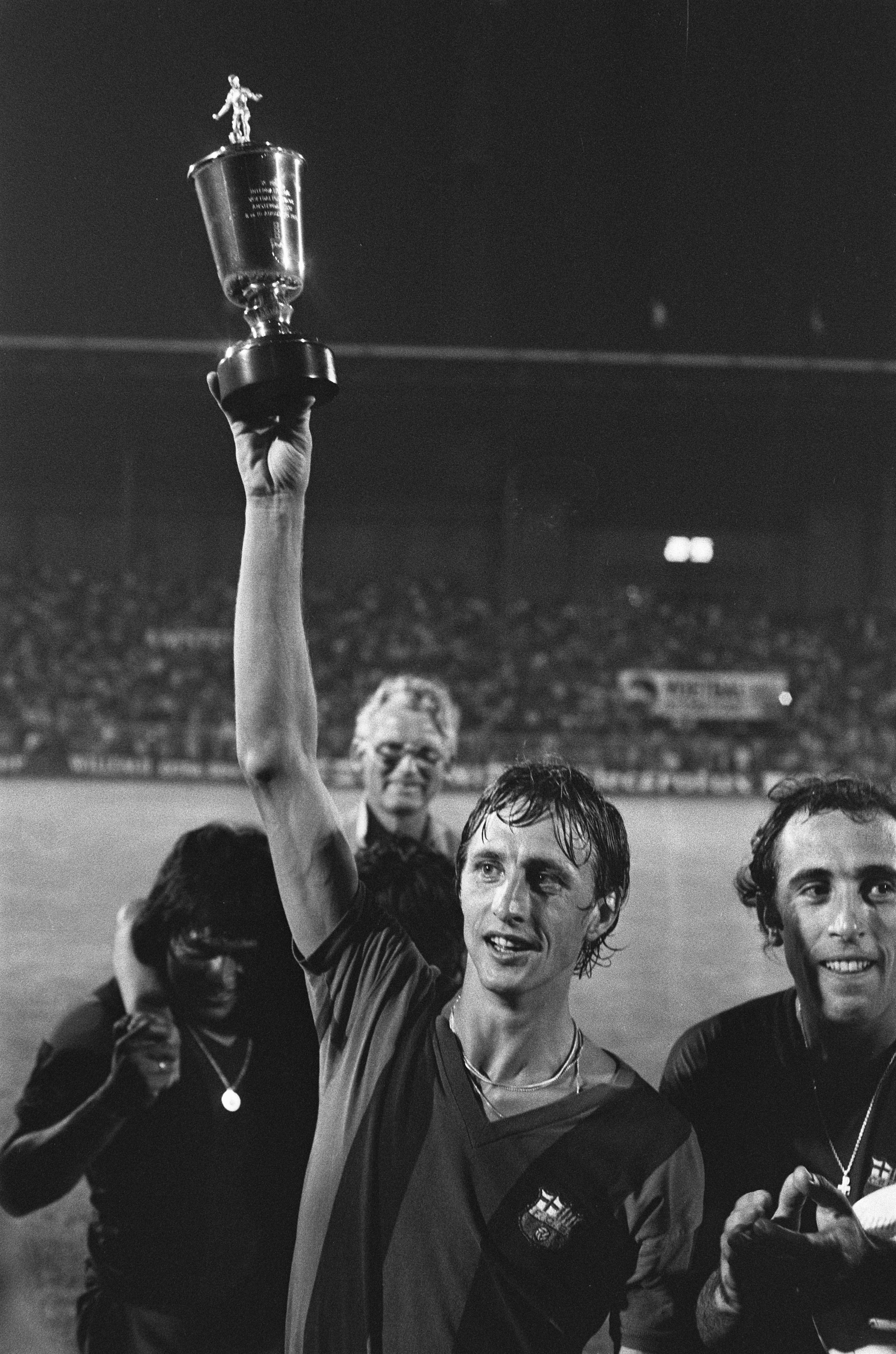
Johan Cruyff scored once in the 1975 tournament for Barcelona.

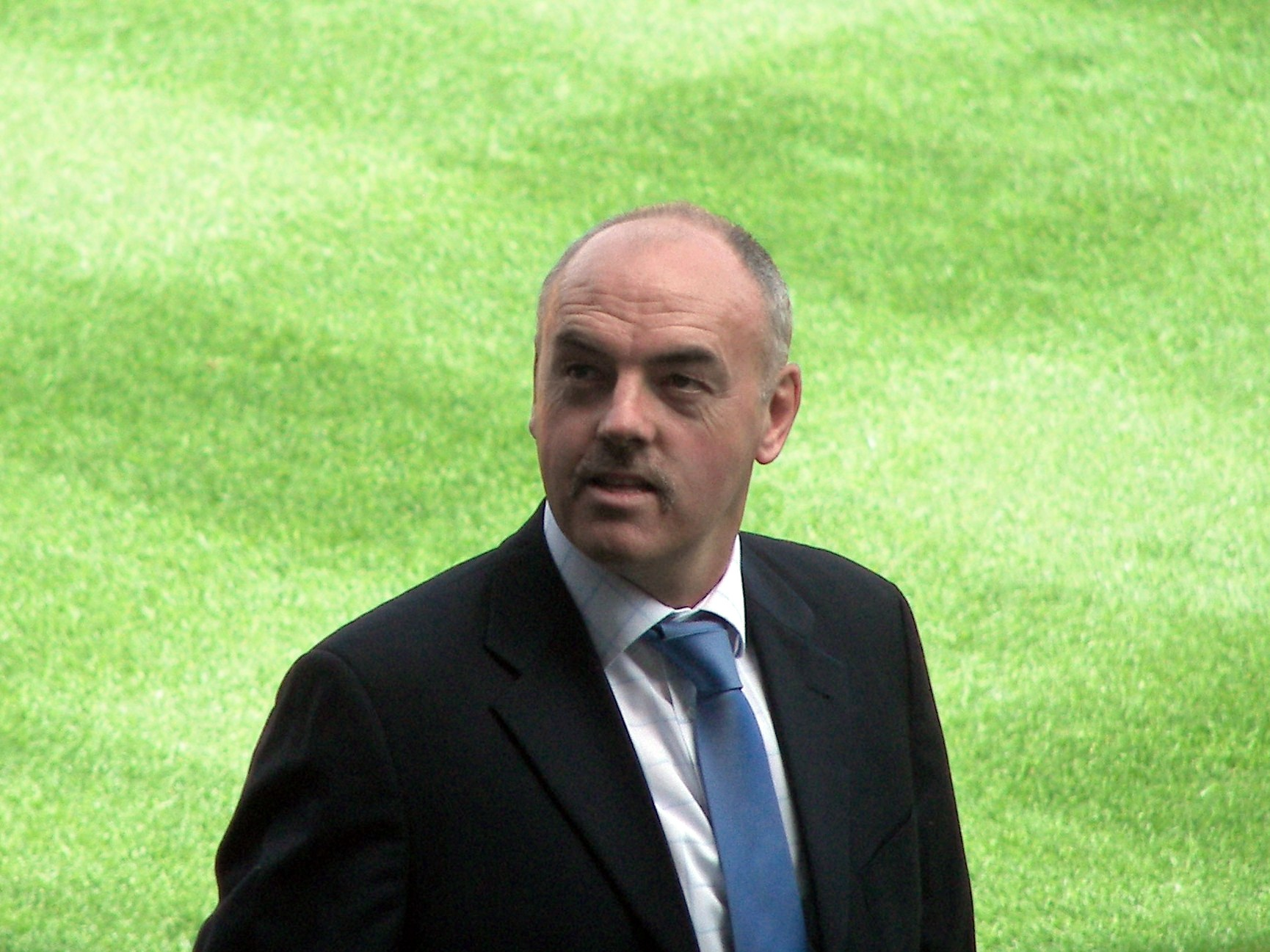
John Wark scored in the 1981 final for Ipswich Town.

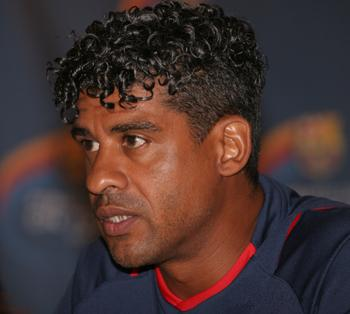
Frank Rijkaard played in the tournament for Ajax.

Edition	Year	Winners	Runners-up	Third place	Fourth place	Notes
1	1975	(Belgium) Molenbeek	(Netherlands) Ajax	(Netherlands) Feyenoord	(Spain) Barcelona	
2	1976	(Belgium) Anderlecht	(Netherlands) Ajax	(Germany) Borussia M'gladbach	(England) Leeds United	
3	1977	(Netherlands) AZ	(Netherlands) Ajax	(England) Liverpool	(Spain) Barcelona	
4	1978	(Netherlands) Ajax	(Belgium) Anderlecht	(Netherlands) AZ	(Brazil) Fluminense	
5	1979	(Netherlands) AZ	(Netherlands) Ajax	(England) Arsenal	(Germany) Hamburger SV	
6	1980	(Netherlands) Ajax	(Netherlands) AZ	(Germany) Bayern Munich	(England) Nottingham Forest	
7	1981	(England) Ipswich Town	(Belgium) Standard Liège	(Netherlands) Ajax	(Netherlands) AZ	
8	1982	(Netherlands) AZ	(Netherlands) Ajax	(Germany) 1. FC Köln	(England) Tottenham Hotspur	
9	1983	(Netherlands) Feyenoord	(Italy) Roma	(Netherlands) Ajax	(England) Manchester United	
10	1984	(Brazil) Atlético Mineiro	(Netherlands) Ajax	(Netherlands) Feyenoord	Romania	
11	1985	(Netherlands) Ajax	(Brazil) Atlético Mineiro	(Spain) Athletic Bilbao	(Italy) Verona	
12	1986	(Soviet Union) Dynamo Kyiv	(Netherlands) Ajax	(England) Manchester United	(Brazil) Botafogo	
13	1987	(Netherlands) Ajax	(Italy) Torino	(Soviet Union) Dynamo Kiev	(Portugal) Porto	
14	1988	(Italy) Sampdoria	(Brazil) Flamengo	(Netherlands) Ajax	(Portugal) Benfica	
15	1989	(Belgium) Mechelen	(Netherlands) Ajax	(Portugal) Sporting CP	(Soviet Union) Dynamo Kyiv	
16	1990	(Belgium) Club Brugge	(Netherlands) Ajax	(Netherlands) PSV	(Belgium) Mechelen	
17	1991	(Netherlands) Ajax	(Netherlands) PSV	(Brazil) Fluminense	(Italy) Sampdoria	
18	1992	(Netherlands) Ajax	(Italy) Roma	(Netherlands) PSV	(Germany) Borussia Dortmund	
19	1999	(Italy) Lazio	(Brazil) Santos	(Netherlands) Ajax	(Spain) Atlético Madrid	
20	2000	(Spain) Barcelona	(Netherlands) Ajax	(Italy) Lazio	(England) Arsenal	
21	2001	(Netherlands) Ajax	(Italy) Milan	(Spain) Valencia	(England) Liverpool	
22	2002	(Netherlands) Ajax	(Spain) Barcelona	(England) Manchester United	(Italy) Parma	
23	2003	(Netherlands) Ajax	(Italy) Internazionale	(Turkey) Galatasaray	(England) Liverpool	
24	2004	(Netherlands) Ajax	(Argentina) River Plate	(Greece) Panathinaikos	(England) Arsenal	
25	2005	(England) Arsenal	(Portugal) Porto	(Argentina) Boca Juniors	(Netherlands) Ajax	
26	2006	(England) Manchester United	(Italy) Internazionale	(Portugal) Porto	(Netherlands) Ajax	
27	2007	(England) Arsenal	(Spain) Atlético Madrid	(Netherlands) Ajax	(Italy) Lazio	
28	2008	(England) Arsenal	(Italy) Internazionale	(Spain) Sevilla	(Netherlands) Ajax	
29	2009	(Portugal) Benfica	(Netherlands) Ajax	(England) Sunderland	(Spain) Atlético Madrid	

== Statistics ==
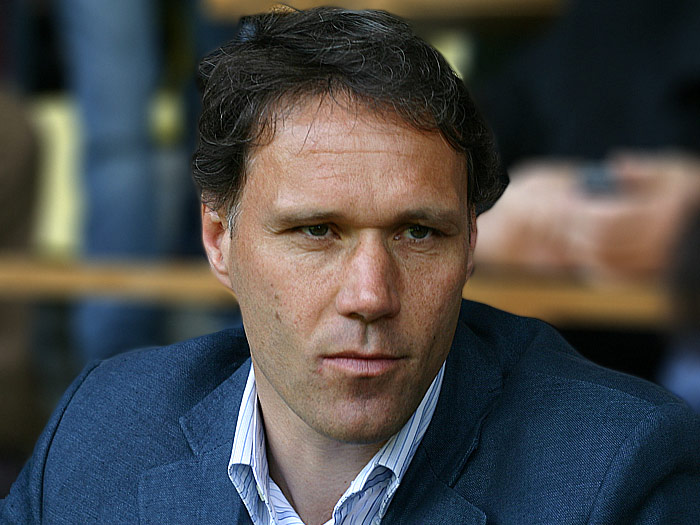
Marco van Basten scored in two consecutive finals for Ajax.

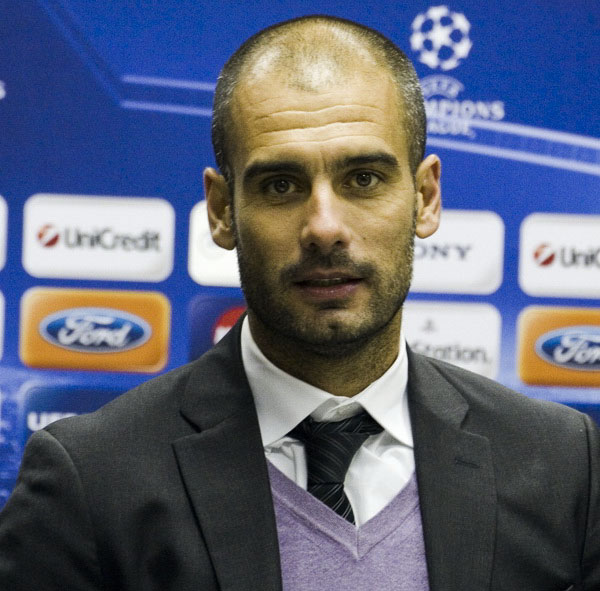
Pep Guardiola was successful in 2000 with Barcelona.

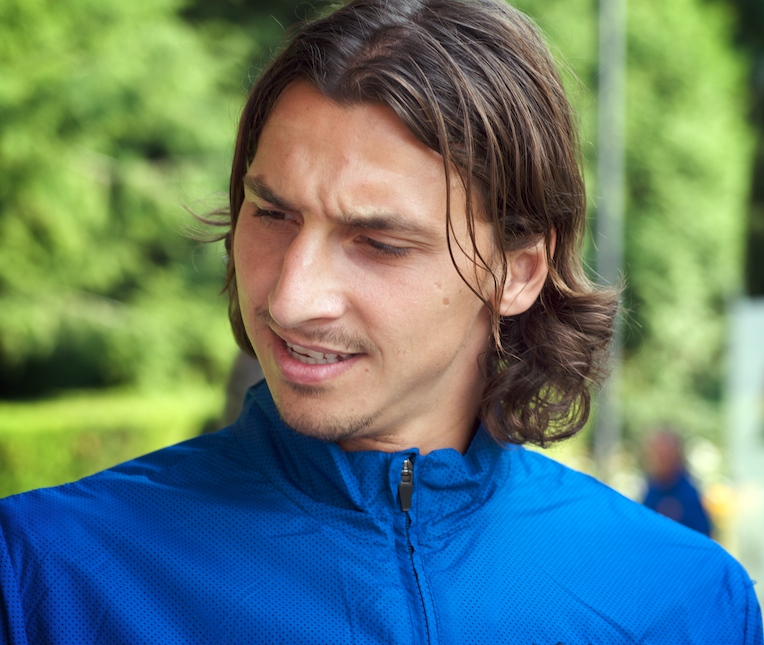
Zlatan Ibrahimović scored in the 2004 tournament for Ajax.

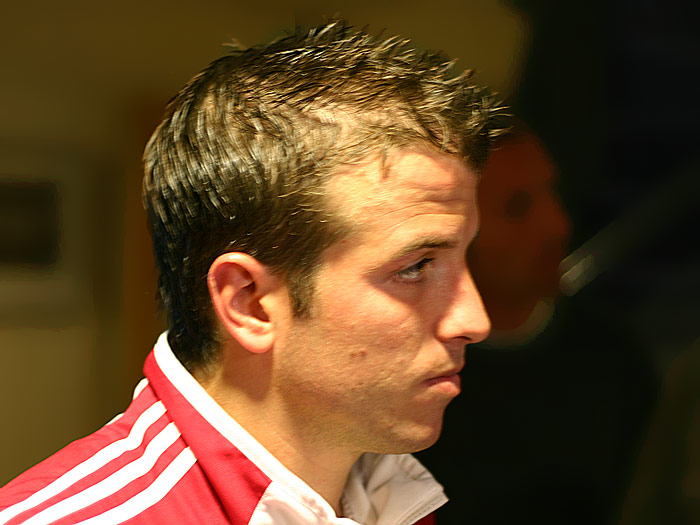
Rafael van der Vaart scored two goals for Ajax in the 2002 edition.

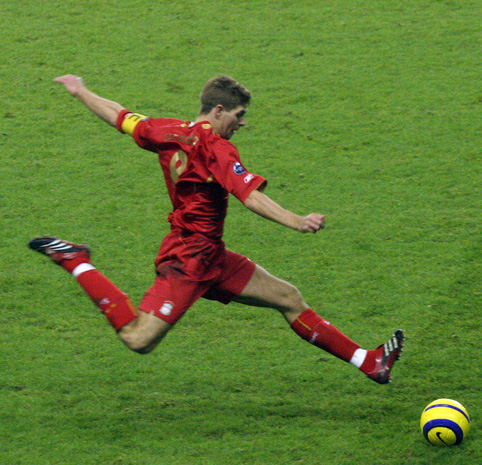
Steven Gerrard played in the tournament for Liverpool.

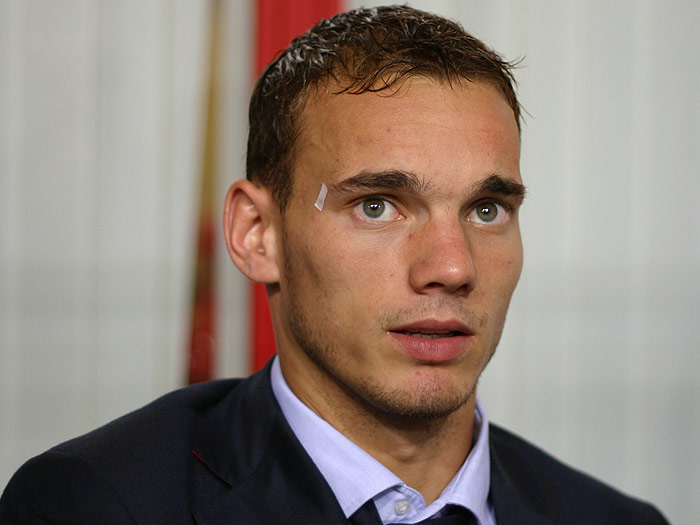
Wesley Sneijder scored in the 2006 tournament for Ajax.

Team	Winner	Runner-up	Third	Fourth	Total
(Netherlands) Ajax	10	11	5	3	29
(Netherlands) AZ	3	1	1	1	6
(England) Arsenal	3	0	1	2	6
(Spain) Barcelona	1	1	0	2	4
(England) Manchester United	1	0	2	1	4
(Netherlands) Feyenoord	1	0	2	0	3
(Soviet Union) Dynamo Kyiv	1	0	1	1	3
(Italy) Lazio	1	0	1	1	3
(Belgium) Anderlecht	1	1	0	0	2
(Brazil) Atlético Mineiro	1	1	0	0	2
(Italy) Sampdoria	1	0	0	1	2
(Belgium) Mechelen	1	0	0	1	2
(Portugal) Benfica	1	0	0	1	2
(Belgium) Molenbeek	1	0	0	0	1
(England) Ipswich Town	1	0	0	0	1
(Belgium) Club Brugge	1	0	0	0	1
(Italy) Internazionale	0	3	0	0	3
(Netherlands) PSV	0	1	2	0	3
(Portugal) Porto	0	1	1	1	3
(Spain) Atlético Madrid	0	1	0	2	3
(England) Liverpool	0	0	1	2	3
(Italy) Roma	0	2	0	0	2
(Brazil) Fluminense	0	0	1	1	2
(Belgium) Standard Liège	0	1	0	0	1
(Italy) Torino	0	1	0	0	1
(Brazil) Flamengo	0	1	0	0	1
(Brazil) Santos	0	1	0	0	1
(Italy) Milan	0	1	0	0	1
(Argentina) River Plate	0	1	0	0	1
(Germany) Borussia M'gladbach	0	0	1	0	1
(Germany) Bayern Munich	0	0	1	0	1
(Germany) 1. FC Köln	0	0	1	0	1
(Spain) Athletic Bilbao	0	0	1	0	1
(Portugal) Sporting CP	0	0	1	0	1
(Spain) Valencia	0	0	1	0	1
(Turkey) Galatasaray	0	0	1	0	1
(Greece) Panathinaikos	0	0	1	0	1
(Argentina) Boca Juniors	0	0	1	0	1
(Spain) Sevilla	0	0	1	0	1
(England) Sunderland	0	0	1	0	1
(England) Leeds United	0	0	0	1	1
(Germany) Hamburger SV	0	0	0	1	1
(England) Nottingham Forest	0	0	0	1	1
(England) Tottenham Hotspur	0	0	0	1	1
Romania	0	0	0	1	1
(Italy) Verona	0	0	0	1	1
(Brazil) Botafogo	0	0	0	1	1
(Germany) Borussia Dortmund	0	0	0	1	1
(Italy) Parma	0	0	0	1	1

== See also ==
- Copa Amsterdam
- Future Cup
