= Tonny Bruins Slot =

Dutch association football coach (1947–2020)

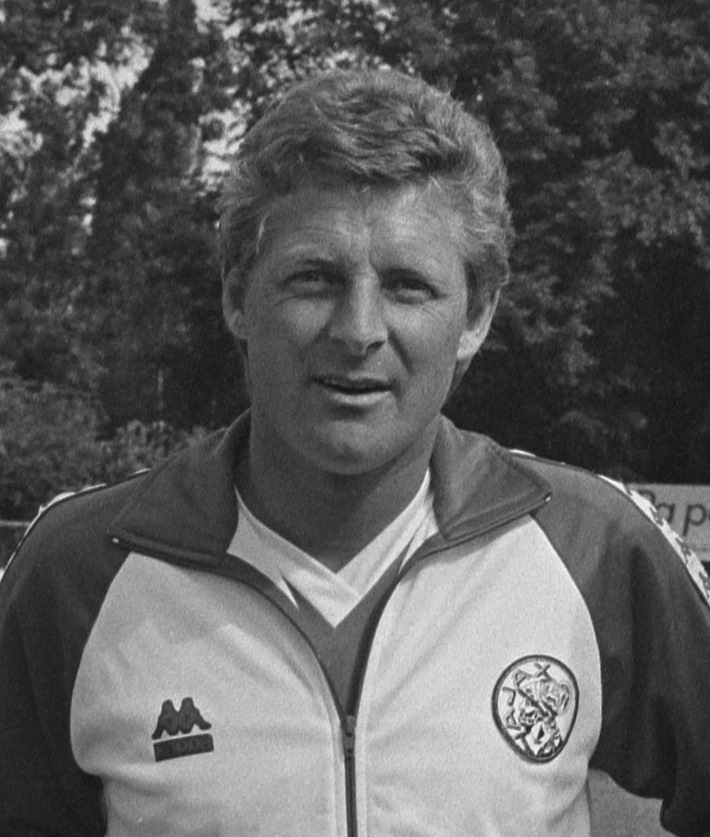
- Tonny Bruins Slot in July 1985, one of the assistants of coach Johan Cruyff, during the presentation of the squad of Ajax for the 1985–86 season.

Personal information
- Date of birth: 1 April 1947
- Place of birth: Amsterdam, Netherlands
- Date of death: 1 November 2020 (aged 73)
- Position: Forward

Senior career*
Years	Team	Apps	(Gls)
1968-1969	AZ'67	4	(1)

Managerial career
- 1972–1978: FC Amsterdam (scout)
- 1978–1980: FC Amsterdam (coach)
- 1982–1985: Ajax (scout, assistant)
- 1985: Ajax (interim)
- 1985–1988: Ajax (assistant)
- 1988–1996: Barcelona (assistant)
- 1996–1999: PSV (youth)
- 1999–2005: Ajax (youth, assistant, analyst)
- 2005: Ajax (interim)
- 2005–2006: Benfica (assistant)
- 2006–2007: PSV (assistant)
- 2007–2008: Valencia (assistant)
- 2009: AZ (assistant)
- 2011–2020: Ajax (chief scout)
- * Club domestic league appearances and goals

Tonny Bruins Slot (1 April 1947 – 1 November 2020) was a Dutch former association football player and (assistent) manager who was well known for his analysis of matches, opponents and players.

== Player career ==
As a forward, Bruins Slot played at DWS, FC Zaanstreek, AZ'67 (the result of a merger between FC Zaanstreek and Alkmaar '54, and later renamed AZ Alkmaar) and Blauw Wit. He played four matches in the Dutch Eredivisie for AZ'67 and scored one goal. He stopped playing due to a knee injury at the age of 24.

== Managerial career ==
Bruins Slot became an assistent manager at Blauw Wit shortly after his playing career ended, following in the footsteps of his father Toon Bruins Slot who had been manager at DWS.

He was manager of FC Amsterdam from 1978 to 1980 and assistant manager of Ajax, also in Amsterdam, from 1982 to 1988. Bruins Slot was the assistant to Aad de Mos at Ajax and was briefly the manager of Ajax, after Aad de Mos stepped down in May 1985 due to conflicts with the board of the club. Bruins Slot became head coach for the final five matches of the season, winning the Eredivisie title in the 1984–85 season, with players such as Frank Rijkaard, Ronald Koeman, Gerald Vanenburg, John van 't Schip, Marco van Basten, Rob de Wit and John Bosman. From the second half of 1985 until January 1988, Bruins Slot was the assistant to Johan Cruyff at Ajax, winning the European Cup Winners' Cup in 1987.

From 1988 to 1996, Bruins Slot was the right-hand man of Johan Cruyff at Barcelona, achieving great success, winning the 1992 European Cup final and four national titles (1991–1994).

Bruins Slot was manager of the youth teams at PSV Eindhoven between 1996 and 1999.

In 2000, manager Frank Rijkaard hired him as analyst for the Netherlands national football team in preparation of and during UEFA Euro 2000 that was hosted jointly in the Netherlands and Belgium.

Bruins Slot returned to Ajax as manager of the second team in 1999, but became a technical liaison manager for the club after changes were made to the staff in 2000. He later returned as assistent manager to support manager Ronald Koeman from 2002 to 2005. When Koeman resigned in February 2005, assistent managers Bruins Slot and Ruud Krol jointly took over the managing duties until Danny Blind was installed as new manager in March 2005.

Bruins Slot rejoined Koeman at Benfica in June 2005, and also at PSV Eindhoven for the 2006–07 season. When Koeman joined Valencia as the club's newly appointed manager in November 2007, he again took Bruins Slot with him.

On 17 May 2009, back in the Netherlands, Tonny Bruins Slot took a position as an assistant manager at AZ, where he was responsible for the tactical analysis of the opponents. On 5 December of the same year, he and manager Ronald Koeman were both dismissed.

On 26 January 2011, it was announced that Bruins Slot would take the position as analyst for Ajax. He made team reports of the next opponents for manager Frank de Boer.

On 21 December 2011, Bruins Slot was appointed to the executive board of Ajax, along with five other candidates.

Ajax named him a Member of merit (Lid van verdienste) in 2019.

== Personal life ==
Bruins Slot was married to Lucienne and had several children and grandchildren. He was the brother-in-law of former football player Theo van Duivenbode.

On 1 November 2020, Bruins Slot died at the age of 73 after several years of health issues.

== Honours ==
=== Manager ===
Ajax

- Eredivisie (1): 1984–85

=== Assistant manager ===
Ajax

- UEFA Cup Winners' Cup (1): 1986–87
- Eredivisie (3): 1982–83, 2001–02, 2003–04
- KNVB Cup (4): 1982–83, 1985–86, 1986–87, 2001–02
- Johan Cruyff Shield (1): 2002
- Amsterdam Tournament (6): 1985, 1987, 2001, 2002, 2003, 2004

FC Barcelona

- European Cup (1): 1991–92
- UEFA Cup Winners' Cup (1): 1988–89
- UEFA Super Cup (1): 1992
- La Liga (4): 1990–91, 1991–92, 1992–93, 1993–94
- Copa del Rey (1): 1989–90
- Supercopa de España (3): 1991, 1992, 1994

Benfica

- Supertaça Cândido de Oliveira (1): 2005

PSV

- Eredivisie (1): 2006–07

AZ Alkmaar

- Johan Cruyff Shield (1): 2009
