= José Antonio Reyes =

Spanish footballer (1983–2019)

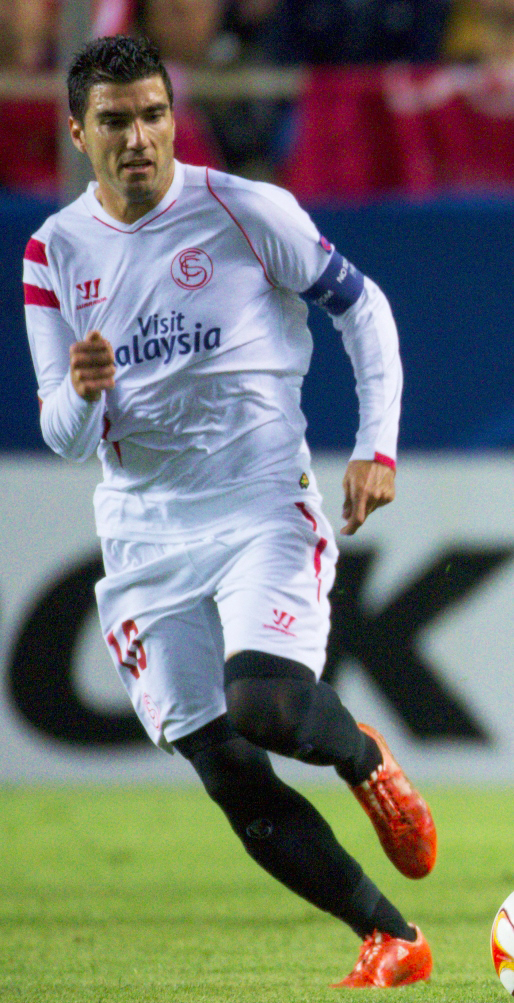
- Reyes with Sevilla in 2015

Personal information
- Full name: José Antonio Reyes Calderón
- Date of birth: 1 September 1983
- Place of birth: Utrera, Spain
- Date of death: 1 June 2019 (aged 35)
- Place of death: Utrera, Spain
- Height: 1.76 m (5 ft 9 in)
- Position: Winger

Youth career
- 1994–1999: Sevilla

Senior career*
Years	Team	Apps	(Gls)
1999–2001	Sevilla B	62	(9)
2000–2004	Sevilla	86	(21)
2004–2007	Arsenal	69	(16)
2006–2007	→ Real Madrid (loan)	30	(6)
2007–2012	Atlético Madrid	103	(8)
2008–2009	→ Benfica (loan)	24	(4)
2012–2016	Sevilla	109	(9)
2016–2017	Espanyol	21	(3)
2018	Córdoba	17	(1)
2018	Xinjiang Tianshan Leopard	14	(4)
2019	Extremadura	9	(0)
Total		544	(81)

International career
1999–2000	Spain U16	7	(5)
2001–2002	Spain U19	7	(3)
2002–2003	Spain U21	7	(3)
2003–2006	Spain	21	(4)
2013	Andalusia	1	(0)
Medal record
Men's football
Representing Spain
UEFA U-19 Championship
Winner	2002 Norway
- * Club domestic league appearances and goals

José Antonio Reyes Calderón (Spanish pronunciation: [xoˈse anˈtonjo ˈreʝes kaldeˈɾon]; 1 September 1983 – 1 June 2019) was a Spanish professional footballer who played mainly as a left winger and also as a forward.

He made his debut for Sevilla aged 16 and signed for English club Arsenal in January 2004, winning the Premier League and FA Cup in his spell in London. He returned to Spain in September 2006, on loan with Real Madrid, where he won La Liga. He then moved to Atlético Madrid, and won the Europa League twice. He also had a short loan spell in Portugal with Benfica, before re-joining Sevilla late in his career and winning the Europa League another three times, reaching a record individual total of five. He later had spells with Espanyol, Córdoba, Xinjiang Tianshan Leopard and Extremadura.

Reyes earned 21 caps for Spain, and played at the 2006 World Cup. He died in June 2019 at the age of 35 in a car crash.

== Club career ==
=== Sevilla ===
Born in Utrera, Province of Seville to Romani parents, Reyes joined the youth ranks of local Sevilla at the age of ten, and went on to represent the club at all youth levels.

Reyes finally signed a full contract in 1999, making his first-team debut during the 1999–2000 season at the age of 16, against Real Zaragoza. He was later called up to Spain's squad for the UEFA European Under-17 Championship, where he scored one goal in the group stage.

With the Andalusians now in Segunda División, Reyes added another appearance. After they were promoted, he established his reputation as a versatile attacking unit in the following years, his 21 La Liga goals over four seasons leading to other teams taking notice.

=== Arsenal ===
Despite Sevilla manager Joaquín Caparrós's wishes to retain him, Reyes signed with English side Arsenal during the January transfer window of the 2003–04 campaign. A £10.5 million transfer fee was negotiated with bonuses, depending on the success of Arsenal, which eventually rose to £17 million.

Reyes made his debut on 1 February 2004 in a 2–1 win over Manchester City, and two days later he scored an own goal against Middlesbrough in the Football League Cup. Later that month, he netted twice against Chelsea to knock them out of the FA Cup; he also scored against the latter opponent in the quarter-finals of the UEFA Champions League, and his goals in the penultimate two games helped Arsenal accomplish their unbeaten season in the Premier League.

Hat-tricks in friendlies during summer 2004 showed Reyes' improvement, and he was a prominent influence on his team's impressive start to 2004–05, in which he managed to score in each of the first six matches. He was named as the Premier League Player of the Month for August 2004; however, he struggled midway through the season and performed inconsistently overall.

In early 2005, Reyes was reported to be homesick while at Arsenal, even though his parents, Mari and Francisco, as well as brother Jesús lived with him in England. During a prank call perpetrated by Cadena COPE in February 2005, a prankster claiming to be Emilio Butragueño, director of football of Real Madrid, speaking on behalf of the president, reportedly called the player's agent and spoke to him about a possible transfer deal. In the ensuing conversation, the latter allegedly declared that life in London was far from what he had envisioned and he would welcome a move back to his country; he also supposedly said that he wanted out of the club as there were "bad people" at Arsenal.

On 21 May 2005, Reyes became only the second player in history (after Kevin Moran) to be sent off in an FA Cup final, when he was dismissed for a second yellow card shortly before the end of extra time against Manchester United, though his team still went on to win the game in a penalty shootout. He temporarily ended speculation about a move away from Highbury in July, when he signed a new six-year contract and declared that he was "looking forward to having many more successful years at the club."

Reyes featured heavily in the Gunners' 2005–06 Champions League run, against, among others, Real Madrid, Juventus and Villarreal, coming on as a substitute in the final against Barcelona, which Arsenal lost 2–1. However, in August 2006, he expressed a desire not to play in the club's Champions League qualifying match against Dinamo Zagreb – to do so would render him 'cup-tied' and complicate a move to Real Madrid; manager Arsène Wenger left him out of the side, thus fuelling speculation that a transfer was soon to be agreed.

=== Loan to Real Madrid ===
Reyes was linked to Real Madrid along with Arsenal teammate Cesc Fàbregas in the summer of 2006, when presidential candidate Arturo Baldasano claimed he would sign both if elected. After making two official statements on Arsenal's website denying media reports of being unhappy, alleged quotes from Reyes in the Spanish press contradicted his denials. This tested the patience of Wenger, who reacted angrily to Real Madrid's attempts to unsettle his player, suggesting that it was not the first time that club had used the media and agents in Spain as a destabilising tactic; shortly before the closure of the transfer window, the teams agreed to exchange him for Brazilian international Júlio Baptista, each on a season-long loan deal.

Reyes scored his first goal for Real on 17 September 2006, with a free kick against Real Sociedad, in a 2–0 home win. On the final day of the season, the focus was on soon-to-be-departed David Beckham and Roberto Carlos, but Reyes, brought from the bench for injured Beckham, netted twice as Real came from behind to beat Mallorca and claim yet another league title.

Real Madrid appointed former Getafe coach Bernd Schuster on 8 July 2007, increasing the chances that Reyes would sign a permanent deal and stay in Spain.

=== Atlético Madrid ===
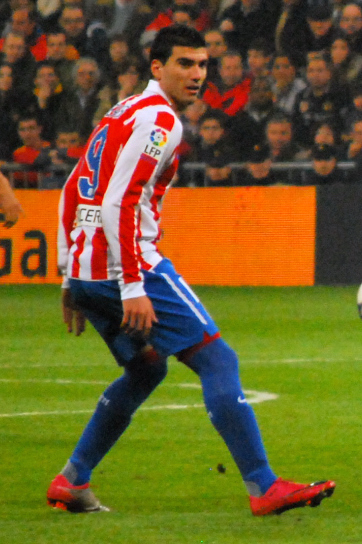
Reyes playing for Atlético Madrid in 2011

Reports surfacing on 29 July 2007 indicated that cross-town rivals Atlético Madrid were on the verge of landing Reyes, and Wenger confirmed that the player's departure was imminent and that a more specific announcement would be made shortly; the following day, he passed his medical and agreed to a four-year deal reportedly worth €12 million, scoring and assisting once on his debut for a 3–1 defeat of Lazio in the annual Amsterdam Tournament (while at Arsenal, he was named the tournament's MVP in its 2004 edition). His first campaign with the Colchoneros was disastrous, as he was often kept out of the side by Maxi Rodríguez and Simão Sabrosa and failed to score a single goal in 26 league appearances.

On 7 August 2008, Benfica announced the signing of Reyes on a one-year loan, with the Portuguese also buying 25% of his playing rights for a fee of €2.65 million and ensuring a buying option of the remainder 75% for an undisclosed fee. His first goal for the Lisbon club was scored against city rivals Sporting CP, on 27 September: after an understanding between Reyes and Pablo Aimar and a pass from the same, he scored in fashion. Later in the same week he found the net again, against Napoli, helping to a 2–0 home victory in the first round of the UEFA Cup.

Reyes' return to Atlético proved to be much more successful, as he re-united with Quique Sánchez Flores, his manager at Benfica from the previous season. He scored his first official goal in Spain in more than two years on 9 January 2010, with a long-range effort at Real Valladolid, in a 4–0 win– by then, he had beaten the competition of Maxi and started in the wings alongside Simão. On 14 February 2010 he put in a Player of the match performance in Atlético's 2–1 victory against Barcelona, setting up the opening goal for Diego Forlán in the eventual champions' only league defeat of the season. Four days later, in the Europa League 1–1 home draw with Galatasaray, he scored a stunning free kick from the right wing on the 22nd minute, after he was brought down just outside the box (3–2 aggregate win). On 28 March, he curled in a left-footed shot from the right wing just inside the box, opening the score in the Madrid derby against his former team in an eventual 3–2 loss.

On 27 August 2010, Reyes opened the 2–0 win over Inter Milan in the UEFA Super Cup after a one-two combination with Argentine Sergio Agüero. His first league goal of the campaign came in a 4–1 defeat at Hércules on 10 January 2011, which inspired an impressive run of scoring form, with goals in successive home games in February/March, against Valencia, former club Sevilla and Villarreal.

Reyes took up more responsibility for 2011–12, and established himself as one of the team's most important players. On 28 July 2011, he scored twice for Atlético in a 2–1 Europa League win against Strømsgodset. A week later, in the second leg, he was again on the scoresheet and also got an assist for Adrián López in a 2–0 away victory; he struggled to find the consistency he had under Flores and, following a fallout with new coach Gregorio Manzano after being substituted in a 3–0 defeat at Athletic Bilbao, his playing time became more and more limited.

=== Return to Sevilla ===
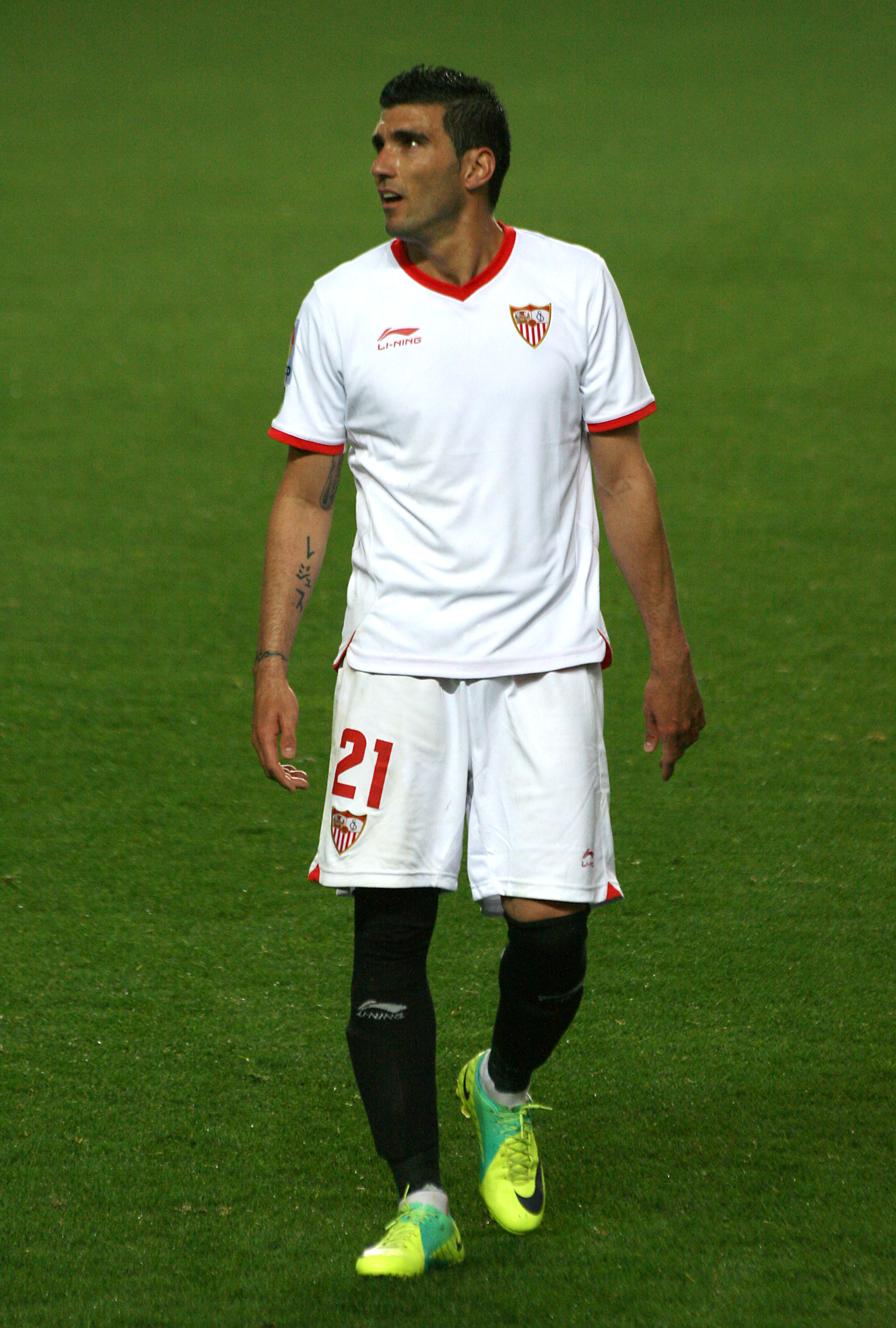
Reyes in action for Sevilla in 2012

On 5 January 2012, Sevilla confirmed the signing of Reyes on a contract until June 2015. He played his first game three days later, starting in a 2–1 away loss against Rayo Vallecano, and scored his only goal of the season on 5 May, in a 5–2 win in the reverse fixture. His first goals of the following campaign came on 18 November 2012, through a first-half brace in a 5–2 Seville derby rout of Real Betis – the opening goal came after eleven seconds.

Reyes scored two goals in 12 Europa League matches as Sevilla won the tournament in 2013–14, including one in the second leg of their last-16 win over city rivals Betis. On 27 May 2015, in the final of the following season's tournament, reportedly his final game for the club, he captained and assisted Carlos Bacca's first of two goals as the team came from behind to defeat Dnipro Dnipropetrovsk 3–2 in Warsaw. However, he remained, starting as skipper in the ensuing Super Cup against Barcelona in Tbilisi and scoring once his side came from 4–1 down to take the game to extra time, but lose nonetheless.

Reyes scored twice as Sevilla advanced to the final of the Copa del Rey, including once in a 4–0 home win over Betis for the round of 16. He missed the final weeks of competition after undergoing surgery to his appendix, and on 1 June 2016 it was announced the 32-year-old would be released upon the expiration of his contract.

=== Espanyol ===
On 28 June 2016, Reyes joined Espanyol on a two-year deal, reuniting with Flores. He made his debut on 20 August, featuring 21 minutes in a 4–6 loss away to his previous team on the opening day of the season.

Reyes scored his first goal for the Pericos on 29 November 2016 in another cameo from the bench, to assure a 1–1 draw at Alcorcón in the first leg of the domestic cup's last-32 stage. On 21 January 2017, this time as a starter, he opened his league account in a 3–1 win over Granada at the RCDE Stadium.

In June 2017, Reyes left the club at the expiry of his contract.

=== Later career ===
On 30 January 2018, 34-year-old Reyes signed for second division side Córdoba. Four months later, he joined Xinjiang Tianshan Leopard from the China League One on a free transfer.

Reyes returned to Spain and its second tier in January 2019, rejoining former Sevilla teammate Diego Capel at Extremadura and agreeing to a five-month deal.

== International career ==
Reyes won his first full cap for Spain on 6 September 2003, coming on as a half-time substitute during a 3–0 friendly win against Portugal in Guimarães. On 11 October, again coming from the bench, this time for Vicente, he scored twice in the final three minutes of a 4–0 victory in Armenia for the UEFA Euro 2004 qualifiers, but was left out of Iñaki Sáez's final squad.

Two years later, Reyes was picked for the 2006 FIFA World Cup, but only took part in one match – the 1–0 group stage win over Saudi Arabia, with Spain already qualified in first place. He was again overlooked for the victorious Euro 2008 tournament, as manager Luis Aragonés preferred the likes of David Silva and Santi Cazorla on the wings.

Reyes also appeared once for the Andalusia regional team.

== Personal life and death ==
Reyes married Noelia López in June 2017. Together, they had two daughters, Noelia and Triana.

Reyes also had a son, José Antonio Jr., from a previous relationship. His son signed for Real Madrid in June 2019, aged 11.

On 1 June 2019, Reyes died at the age of 35 following a car accident while travelling between Utrera and Seville with his cousins, Jonathan Reyes, who also died, and Juan Manuel Calderón, who was taken to a hospital in serious condition. According to the police, the car had been traveling between 111 km/h (69 mph) and 128 km/h (81 mph) and potentially suffered a steering or tyre failure. This report disputed the earlier claims that the car was speeding at 220 km/h (135 mph).

Many footballers and his former clubs offered their condolences to Reyes' family, and a moment of silence was observed at the 2019 UEFA Champions League final, played in Madrid later that day. His funeral took place on 3 June in his hometown of Utrera, and his last team Extremadura retired his shirt number 19 shortly after; in February 2020 this number was erroneously given to Chinese new signing Gao Leilei, with the error being later rectified.

== Career statistics ==
=== Club ===
Appearances and goals by club, season and competition
Club	Season	League			National cup		League cup		Continental		Other		Total	
Club	Season	Division	Apps	Goals	Apps	Goals	Apps	Goals	Apps	Goals	Apps	Goals	Apps	Goals
Sevilla B	1999–2000	Segunda División B	32	1	—		—		—		—		32	1
Sevilla	1999–2000	La Liga	1	0	0	0	—		—		—		1	0
Sevilla	2000–01	Segunda División	1	0	1	0	—		—		—		2	0
Sevilla	2001–02	La Liga	29	8	1	0	—		—		—		30	8
Sevilla	2002–03	La Liga	34	8	4	2	—		—		—		38	10
Sevilla	2003–04	La Liga	21	5	4	1	—		—		—		25	6
Sevilla	Total		86	21	10	3	—		—		—		96	24
Arsenal	2003–04	Premier League	13	2	4	2	0	0	4 (Note: Appearances in UEFA Champions League)	1	—		21	5
Arsenal	2004–05	Premier League	30	9	6	1	0	0	8	1	1 (Note: Appearance in FA Community Shield)	1	45	12
Arsenal	2005–06	Premier League	26	5	5	1	0	0	12	0	1	0	44	6
Arsenal	Total		69	16	15	4	0	0	24	2	2	1	110	23
Real Madrid (loan)	2006–07	La Liga	30	6	4	0	—		4	1	—		38	7
Atlético Madrid	2007–08	La Liga	26	0	5	0	—		6 (Note: Appearances in UEFA Cup)	0	—		37	0
Atlético Madrid	2009–10	La Liga	30	2	9	1	—		14 (Note: Appearances in UEFA Champions League and UEFA Europa League)	1	—		53	4
Atlético Madrid	2010–11	La Liga	34	6	5	0	—		4 (Note: Appearances in UEFA Europa League)	0	1 (Note: Appearances in UEFA Super Cup)	1	44	7
Atlético Madrid	2011–12	La Liga	13	0	0	0	—		7	3	—		20	3
Atlético Madrid	Total		103	8	19	1	—		31	4	1	1	154	14
Benfica (loan)	2008–09	Primeira Liga	24	4	2	0	4	1	5	1	—		35	6
Sevilla	2011–12	La Liga	19	1	1	0	—		—		—		20	1
Sevilla	2012–13	La Liga	26	4	6	0	—		—		—		32	4
Sevilla	2013–14	La Liga	21	0	1	0	—		12	2	—		34	2
Sevilla	2014–15	La Liga	19	3	4	1	—		13	1	1	0	37	5
Sevilla	2015–16	La Liga	24	1	5	2	—		4	0	1	1	34	4
Sevilla	Total		109	9	17	3	—		29	3	2	1	157	16
Espanyol	2016–17	La Liga	21	3	2	1	—		—		—		23	4
Córdoba	2017–18	Segunda División	17	1	0	0	—		—		—		17	1
Xinjiang Tianshan Leopard	2018	China League One	14	4	0	0	—		—		—		14	4
Extremadura	2018–19	Segunda División	9	0	0	0	—		—		—		9	0
Career total			514	73	69	12	4	1	93	11	5	3	685	100

=== International ===
Appearances and goals by national team and year
National team	Year	Apps	Goals
Spain	2003	4	2
Spain	2004	6	0
Spain	2005	5	0
Spain	2006	6	2
Total		21	4

Scores and results list Spain's goal tally first, score column indicates score after each Reyes goal.

List of international goals scored by José Antonio Reyes
No.	Date	Venue	Opponent	Score	Result	Competition
1	11 October 2003	Vazgen Sargsyan Republican Stadium, Yerevan, Armenia	Armenia	3–0	4–0	UEFA Euro 2004 qualifying
2	11 October 2003	Vazgen Sargsyan Republican Stadium, Yerevan, Armenia	Armenia	4–0	4–0	UEFA Euro 2004 qualifying
3	1 March 2006	José Zorrilla Stadium, Valladolid, Spain	Ivory Coast	2–1	3–2	Friendly
4	3 June 2006	Estadio Martínez Valero, Elche, Spain	Egypt	2–0	2–0	Friendly

== Honours ==
Sevilla

- Segunda División: 2000–01
- UEFA Europa League: 2013–14, 2014–15, 2015–16
- Copa del Rey runner-up: 2015–16
- UEFA Super Cup runner-up: 2014, 2015

Arsenal

- Premier League: 2003–04
- FA Cup: 2004–05
- FA Community Shield: 2004
- UEFA Champions League runner-up: 2005–06

Real Madrid

- La Liga: 2006–07

Atlético Madrid

- UEFA Europa League: 2009–10, 2011–12
- UEFA Super Cup: 2010
- Copa del Rey runner-up: 2009–10

Benfica

- Taça da Liga: 2008–09

Spain U19

- UEFA European Under-19 Championship: 2002

'Individual

- Premier League Player of the Month: August 2004
- UEFA Super Cup Player of the Match: 2010
- Ballon d'Or nominee: 2004
