= Jeffrey Sneijder =

Dutch footballer

Jeff Sneijder
Personal information
- Full name: Jeffrey Sneijder
- Date of birth: 16 September 1982 (age 44)
- Place of birth: Utrecht, Netherlands
- Height: 1.80 m (5 ft 11 in)
- Position: Winger

Youth career
- –2001: Jong Ajax
- 2004–2005: Ajax A2
- 2005–2006: Jong RKC

Senior career*
Years	Team	Apps	(Gls)
2001–2004	Stormvogels Telstar		
2006–2007	Den Bosch		
2007–2008	USV Elinkwijk		
- * Club domestic league appearances and goals as of 19 November 2008 ‡ National team caps and goals as of 20 November 2008

Jeffrey Sneijder (born 16 September 1982) is a Dutch former footballer who played as a winger.

== Club career ==
He started his career at Jong Ajax in a team with Maarten Stekelenburg and Rafael van der Vaart, before he was transferred to Stormvogels Telstar in July 2001. In February 2004, he injured his meniscus. He paused from football and began his comeback at Jong Ajax in July 2004 and 2005 he went to Jong RKC. He left Jong RKC in June 2006 and moved to Den Bosch, where he left in August 2007 to play for lower league side USV Elinkwijk.

== Personal life ==
Jeffrey Sneijder is the brother of Wesley, and also Rodney also footballers; the former is retired. During an interview in a radio station in Thessaloniki, Sneijder's brother Rodney confirmed that he and Wesley Sneijder (along with their other brother Jeffrey) have part-Greek descent, since their grandmother (their father's mother) was a Greek woman born in Kavala, Macedonia, Greece and moved to Utrecht before World War II.
