= 2007 Amsterdam Tournament =

International football competition

The LG Amsterdam Tournament 2007 was a pre-season football tournament contested by Ajax, Arsenal, Atlético Madrid and Lazio on 2 August and 4 August 2007 at the Amsterdam ArenA.

== Table ==
Team	Pld	W	D	L	GF	GA	GD	Pts
(England) Arsenal	2	2	0	0	3	1	+2	9
(Spain) Atlético Madrid	2	1	0	1	3	3	0	6
(Netherlands) Ajax	2	1	0	1	2	1	+1	5
(Italy) Lazio	2	0	0	2	2	5	-3	2

NB: An extra point is awarded for each goal scored.

== Results ==
=== Day 1 ===
2007-08-02
18:30 CET

Lazio (Italy)	1 – 2	(England) Arsenal
Pandev 40'	(Report)	Bendtner 19'; Eduardo 55'

Amsterdam Arena, Amsterdam
Attendance: 20,000
Referee: Bas Nijhuis (Netherlands)
2007-08-02
20:45 CET

Ajax (Netherlands)	2 – 0	(Spain) Atlético Madrid
Gabri 47'; Sneijder 59'	(Report)

Amsterdam Arena, Amsterdam
Attendance: 11,000
Referee: Eric Braamhaar (Netherlands)

=== Day 2 ===
2007-08-04
19:00 CET

Lazio (Italy)	1 – 3	(Spain) Atlético Madrid
Mauri 66'	(Report)	Braulio 39'; L. García 65'; Reyes 69'

Amsterdam Arena, Amsterdam
Attendance: 20,000
Referee: Ruud Bossen
2007-08-04
21:15 CET

Ajax (Netherlands)	0 – 1	(England) Arsenal
	(Report)	Van Persie 87'

Amsterdam Arena, Amsterdam
Referee: Eric Blom (Netherlands)
