= 2006 Amsterdam Tournament =

International football competition

The LG Amsterdam Tournament 2006 was a pre-season football tournament contested by Ajax, Porto, Internazionale and Manchester United on 4 August and 5 August 2006 at the Amsterdam ArenA.

== Table ==
Team	Pld	W	D	L	GF	GA	GD	Pts
(England) Manchester United	2	2	0	0	4	1	+3	10
(Italy) Internazionale	2	1	1	0	4	3	+1	8
(Portugal) Porto	2	0	0	2	3	6	-3	3
(Netherlands) Ajax	2	0	1	1	1	2	-1	2

NB: An extra point is awarded for each goal scored.

== Results ==
=== Day 1 ===
2006-08-04

Manchester United (England)	3 – 1	(Portugal) Porto
Scholes 11'; Rooney 19'; Solskjær 73'	(Report)	Pepe 76'

Amsterdam Arena, Amsterdam
Attendance: 25,000
Referee: Ruud Bossen (Netherlands)
2006-08-04

Ajax (Netherlands)	1 – 1	(Italy) Internazionale
Sneijder 86'	(Report)	Solari 18'

Amsterdam Arena, Amsterdam
Attendance: 25,500
Referee: Jan Wegereef (Netherlands)

=== Day 2 ===
2006-08-05

Internazionale (Italy)	3 – 2	(Portugal) Porto
Pizarro 7'; Martins 8', 38'	(Report)	Adriano 80'; Čech 90'

Amsterdam Arena, Amsterdam
Referee: Kevin Blom (Netherlands)
2006-08-05

Ajax (Netherlands)	0 – 1	(England) Manchester United
	(Report)	Giggs 76'

Amsterdam Arena, Amsterdam
