= Rodney Sneijder =

Dutch footballer (born 1991)

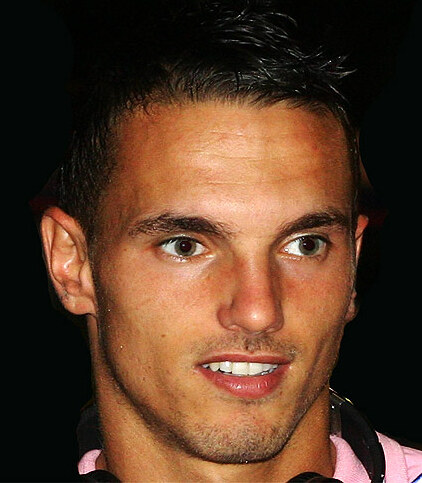
- Sneijder in 2011

Personal information
- Date of birth: 31 March 1991 (age 35)
- Place of birth: Utrecht, Netherlands
- Height: 1.75 m (5 ft 9 in)
- Position: Midfielder

Team information
- Current team: OSM '75 Maarssen

Youth career
- 1997–1999: DOS
- 1999–2011: Ajax

Senior career*
Years	Team	Apps	(Gls)
2011–2012	Ajax	0	(0)
2011–2012	→ Utrecht (loan)	23	(3)
2012–2014	RKC Waalwijk	26	(2)
2014–2015	Almere City	26	(0)
2015	Dundee United	1	(0)
2016–2017	Jong Utrecht	12	(0)
2017–2024	DHSC		
2024–2025	De Meern		
2025–	OSM '75 Maarssen		

International career
2008–2009	Netherlands U17	7	(2)
2009–2010	Netherlands U19	6	(0)
- * Club domestic league appearances and goals as of 26 January 2026

Rodney Sneijder (born 31 March 1991) is a Dutch footballer who plays as a midfielder for OSM '75 Maarssen. He is the brother of Wesley Sneijder and Jeffrey Sneijder.

== Club career ==
=== Ajax ===
Born in Utrecht, Rodney Sneijder joined the De Toekomst youth set up at Ajax in 2000 after scoring four goals in a 7–1 win over an Ajax junior side for youth team, DOS Elinkwijk.

In May 2008, it was reported that Wesley Sneijder had prevented his younger brother from a summer transfer to his club at the time, Real Madrid. Wesley Sneijder said, "Real Madrid wanted him and Rodney was very happy about that. But when I heard, I stopped the discussions. I am not in favour of juniors increasingly going to top clubs. I've told him that he first must make a break through at Ajax."

He was elevated to the senior squad at 19 years of age in January 2011 and a month later signed a professional contract with the club to extend his stay at Ajax until at least 2013. Sneijder was included in the club's first team when he appeared as an unused substitute in the Johan Cruijff Schaal, in a 2–1 loss against Twente.

==== FC Utrecht (loan) ====
Sneijder had several clubs interested in him during the 2011 summer transfer window but chose to sign for FC Utrecht on a season long loan. Upon joining the club, he was given the number 21 shirt.

He made his league debut on 27 August 2011, scoring in a 3–1 victory over Roda JC. For his debut performance, Sneijder was named in the Team of the Week. Sneijder's playing time at Utrecht led him to continue to play for the club. He scored his second goal for Utrecht in a 3–0 defeat of RKC Waalwijk on 1 October, opening the scoring in the 16th minute with a free kick. Once again, Sneijder was named in the Team of the Week/ Sneijder's third goal for the club came soon after, a 30-yard shot on 22 October against Heerenveen, but the goal proved only to be a consolation as Utrecht lost 4–1. Sneijder started in a match against his parent club, Ajax, in a 6–4 win on 6 November 2011. In the second meeting against Ajax on 5 February 2012, which Utrecht won 2–0, Sneijder was subjected to abuse from Ajax supporters. He made his 20th and last Eredivisie appearance for Utrecht in the final game of the season, another 3–1 victory over Roda JC, when he was substituted in the 85th minute for Gevero Markiet.

Despite featuring regularly in the first team squad, making twenty-three appearances and scoring three times, Sneijder was for tactical reasons often a substitute rather than in the starting lineup. However, his performances led to Utrecht considering signing Sneijder for the next season.

=== RKC Waalwijk ===
Upon returning to his parent club, Sneijder held a discussions with Manager Frank de Boer about his future, but was told he would be playing in the reserve if he returned.

On 9 July 2012 it was announced that Rodney Sneijder had taken a two-year contract with the club from Waalwijk, where he was reunited with Manager Erwin Koeman. Sneijder signed a two-year contract with the North Brabant club, lasting through June 2014. According to Rodney, Wesley said the move to RKC was right for him, citing quick development.

In his full debut with RKC, Sneijder scored two goals to help his new side to a 3–2 victory over Dutch giants PSV on 12 August. Sneijder scored his third goal of the season, in the second round of the KNVB Cup, in a 5–0 win over Lisse on 25 September 2012. Sneijder continued to be in the first team by the half of the season, but his first team place was under threat and mostly came on as a substitute, with Koeman preferring Nourdin Boukhari, citing more experience. Sneijder ended his 2012–13 season after suffering a hamstring injury, which he sustained during a 1–1 draw against Feyenoord. Although recovered from a hamstring injury, there was a chance for Sneijder to return to the first team in the final game of the season, but he wasn't included in the squad. In his first season at RKC, Sneijder made twenty-six appearances and scoring three times for the club.

In his second season at RKC, Sneijder found himself linked with a move to Şanlıurfaspor, but the talks never took place. However, the relationship between Koeman and Sneijder was strained and was considering selling him, after the talks between the pair, the relationship was amended. Having made no appearance and appeared two matches as an un-used substitute, it was announced that Sneijder and the club reached agreement to allow Sneijder to find a new club.

=== Almere City ===
After his contract with RKC Waalwijk had been dissolved on 1 February 2014, Sneijder signed with Eerste Divisie side Almere City until the end of the season. It was then revealed that Rodney was keen to join Wesley's club Galatasaray before he joined Almere City

Sneijder made his Almere City debut, playing 90 minutes, in a 2–1 win over Eindhoven on 7 February 2015. Seven days later, Sneijder provided an assist for Vincent Janssen, in a 4–1 loss against Emmen on 14 February 2014. Sneijder ended the season with six appearances for the club. Sneijder's contract with the club was soon extended for one year.

In his second season, Sneijder continued to be in the regular first team until he suffered an injury that kept him out for weeks. In the winter transfer window, Sneijder asked the club to terminate his contract with Almere City, to proceed joining Galatasaray. However, the claim was denied by the club. After making twenty appearances for the club, Sneijder was released by the club.

=== Dundee United and return to the Netherlands ===
After leaving Almere City, Sneijder went on trial at Scottish Premiership side Dundee United, where he played in a friendly match against AZ Alkmaar. On 26 July 2015, Sneijder signed for United as a free agent. Sneijder was released from his contract on 25 August 2015 with immediate effect. United said they had "the responsibility to protect his health moving forward".

Sneijder returned to Utrecht in August 2016, signing a one-year contract to play for the Jong FC Utrecht team in the Eerste Divisie. After making twelve appearances, he decided to leave the club in February 2017. In August 2017, Sneijder joined amateur Eerste Klasse club DHSC, where his brother Jeffrey is assistant coach.

On 27 March 2024, Sneijder agreed to join De Meern, who were relegated to the Tweede Klasse ahead of his arrival in July 2024.

== International career ==
Sneijder was first called up by Netherlands U17 in May 2008 and made his Netherlands U17 debut, in a 3–0 loss against Turkey U17 on 4 May 2008. Sneijder scored his first Netherlands U17 in his fourth appearance, in a 2–1 loss against Spain U17. Sneijder previously scored his first goal for Netherlands U17, in a 2–1 win over Hungary U17 in the elite round of UEFA Euro U17 Championship.

The following year, Sneijder was called up by Netherlands U19 in March 2009 and went on to make six appearances.

== Personal life ==
Despite being prevented from joining Real Madrid, Sneijder considered his brother, Wesley, as his second father.

In July 2013, Sneijder severed ties with agent Soren Lerby.

During an interview in a radio station in Thessaloniki, Rodney confirmed that he and Wesley Sneijder (along with their other brother Jeffrey) have part-Greek descent, since their grandmother (their father's mother) was a Greek woman born in Kavala, Macedonia, Greece and moved to Utrecht before World War II.
