= List of most expensive Dutch football transfers =

The following is a list of the most expensive Dutch football transfers, which details the highest transfer fees ever paid for Dutch footballers, as well as the largest transfer fees paid and received by Dutch football clubs. The current transfer record for a Dutch footballer was set by the transfer of Nina Nijstad from PSV to Portland Thorns for €600 thousand in July 2026, while the record for a Dutch man was set by the transfer of Virgil van Dijk from Southampton to Liverpool for €84.65 million in December 2017.

For women football records are less well kept. Players usually leave or join as a free agent. Unlike male football where transfers are well documented and published. The records for the largest transfer fees paid and received by a Dutch men's club are both held by Ajax, receiving the most for Antony when he was sold to Manchester United for €95 million, and they paid the most for Steven Bergwijn when he came over from Tottenham Hotspur for €31.25 million. Both records were set in 2022.

== Highest transfer payments for Dutch football players ==
Highest transfer payments paid by Dutch football clubs. The majority of transfer fees listed are not officially disclosed by the trading clubs and are reported by reliable mainstream media. Different media outlets may report varying transfer fees. The transfer fees are ranked in Euros (€) without accounting for add-ons, with fees that include add-ons signified by a note.

=== Women ===
As of 2 August 2026

Top 10 most expensive transfers for Dutch football players
Rank	Player	From	To	Position	Fee (Note: When there are two or more transfers of the same value, the earliest signing ranks higher) (€ thousand)	Year	Ref.
1	Nina Nijstad	(Netherlands) PSV	(United States) Portland Thorns	Midfielder	600	2026	
2	Janou Levels	(Germany) Wolfsburg	(Spain) Real Madrid	Defender	600	2026	
3	Lotte Keukelaar	(Netherlands) Ajax	(Spain) Real Madrid	Forward	500	2025	
4	Jill Roord	(Germany) Wolfsburg	(England) Manchester City	Midfielder	450	2023	
5	Nikée van Dijk	(Netherlands) Twente	(Italy) Internazionale	Forward	450	2025	
6	Jackie Groenen	(England) Manchester United	(France) Paris Saint-Germain	Midfielder	150	2022	
7	Lize Kop	(England) Leicester City	(England) Tottenham Hotspur	Goalkeeper	150 (Note: Initial €150 thousand plus €50 thousand in possible add-ons)	2025	
8	Victoria Pelova	(Netherlands) Ajax	(England) Arsenal	Midfielder	100	2023	
9	Wieke Kaptein	(Netherlands) Twente	(England) Chelsea	Midfielder	100 (Note: Initial €100 thousand plus €30 to €50 thousand in possible add-ons)	2023	
10	Daphne van Domselaar	(England) Aston Villa	(England) Arsenal	Goalkeeper	100 (Note: Initial €100 thousand plus €20 thousand in possible add-ons)	2024	

=== Men ===
As of 21 August 2026

Top 20 most expensive transfers for Dutch male football players
Rank	Player	From	To	Position	Fee (Note: When there are two or more transfers of the same value, the earliest signing ranks higher) (€ million)	Year	Ref.
1	Virgil van Dijk	(England) Southampton	(England) Liverpool	Defender	84.65	2017	
2	Frenkie de Jong	(Netherlands) Ajax	(Spain) Barcelona	Midfielder	75 (Note: Initial €75 million plus €11 million in possible add-ons)	2019	
3	Matthijs de Ligt (1)	(Netherlands) Ajax	(Italy) Juventus	Defender	75 (Note: Initial €75 million plus €10.5 million in possible add-ons)	2019	
4	Crysencio Summerville	(England) West Ham United	(Saudi Arabia) Al Hilal	Midfielder	70	2026	
5	Matthijs de Ligt (2)	(Italy) Juventus	(Germany) Bayern Munich	Defender	67 (Note: Initial €67 million plus €10 million in possible add-ons)	2022	
6	Tijjani Reijnders (2)	(England) Manchester City	(Saudi Arabia) Al Qadsiah	Midfielder	61	2026	
7	Xavi Simons (2)	(Germany) RB Leipzig	(England) Tottenham Hotspur	Midfielder	60 (Note: Initial €60 million plus €5 to €10 million in possible add-ons)	2023	
8	Jan Paul van Hecke	(Germany) Brighton & Hove Albion	(England) Tottenham Hotspur	Defender	60	2026	
9	Tijjani Reijnders (1)	(Italy) AC Milan	(England) Manchester City	Midfielder	55 (Note: Initial €55 million plus €15 million in possible add-ons)	2025	
10	Teun Koopmeiners	(Italy) Atalanta	(Italy) Juventus	Midfielder	51.3 (Note: Initial €51.3 million plus €9.4 million in possible add-ons)	2024	
11	Xavi Simons (1)	(France) Paris Saint-Germain	(Germany) RB Leipzig	Midfielder	50 (Note: Initial €50 million plus €30 million in possible add-ons)	2023	
12	Nathan Aké	(England) Bournemouth	(England) Manchester City	Defender	45.3 (Note: Initial €45.3 million plus €5 million in possible add-ons)	2020	
13	Matthijs de Ligt (3)	(Germany) Bayern Munich	(England) Manchester United	Defender	45 (Note: Initial €45 million plus €5 million in possible add-ons)	2024	
14	Ian Maatsen	(England) Chelsea	(England) Aston Villa	Midfielder	44.5	2024	
15	Jorrel Hato	(Netherlands) Ajax	(England) Chelsea	Defender	44.18	2025	
16	Joshua Zirkzee	(Italy) Bologna	(England) Manchester United	Forward	42.5	2024	
17	Cody Gakpo	(Netherlands) PSV	(England) Liverpool	Forward	42 (Note: Initial €42 million plus €8 to €13 million in possible add-ons)	2022	
18	Marc Overmars	(England) Arsenal	(Spain) Barcelona	Midfielder	40	2000	
19	Jurriën Timber	(Netherlands) Ajax	(England) Arsenal	Defender	40 (Note: Initial €40 million plus €5 million in possible add-ons)	2023	
20	Micky van de Ven	(Germany) Wolfsburg	(England) Tottenham Hotspur	Defender	40 (Note: Initial €40 million plus €10 million in possible add-ons)	2023	

== Biggest transfers involving Dutch football clubs ==
=== Incoming transfers ===
Highest transfer payments paid by Dutch football clubs. The majority of transfer fees listed are not officially disclosed by the trading clubs and are reported by reliable mainstream media. Different media outlets may report varying transfer fees. The transfer fees are ranked in Euro's (€) without accounting for add-ons, with fees that include add-ons signified by a note.

==== Women ====
As of 2 August 2026

Top 3 most expensive incoming transfers for a Dutch club
Rank	Player	From	To	Position	Fee (Note: When there are two or more transfers of the same value, the earliest signing ranks higher) (€ thousand)	Year	Ref.
1	(Netherlands) Rosalie Renfurm	(Netherlands) FC Utrecht (women)	(Netherlands) PSV	Midfielder	40	2022	
2	(Netherlands) Danique Ypema	(Netherlands) Heerenveen	(Netherlands) Twente	Defender	15	2019	
3	(Netherlands) Chimera Ripa	(Netherlands) VV Alkmaar	(Netherlands) PSV	Midfielder	10	2022	

==== Men ====
As of 2 August 2026

Top 10 most expensive incoming transfers for a Dutch club
Rank	Player	From	To	Position	Fee (Note: When there are two or more transfers of the same value, the earliest signing ranks higher) (€ million)	Year	Ref.
1	(Netherlands) Steven Bergwijn	(England) Tottenham Hotspur	(Netherlands) Ajax	Forward	31.25	2022	
2	(France) Calvin Bassey	(England) West Ham United	(Netherlands) Ajax	Forward	23 (Note: Initial €23 million plus €3.5 million in possible add-ons)	2022	
3	(France) Sébastien Haller	(England) West Ham United	(Netherlands) Ajax	Forward	22.25	2021	
4	(Croatia) Josip Šutalo	(Croatia) Dinamo Zagreb	(Netherlands) Ajax	Defender	20.5 (Note: Initial €20.5 million plus €3 million in possible add-ons)	2023	
5	(Brazil) Marcos Leonardo	(Saudi Arabia) Al Hilal	(Netherlands) Ajax	Forward	19.5	2026	
6	(Netherlands) Brian Brobbey	(Germany) RB Leipzig	(Netherlands) Ajax	Forward	16.35 (Note: Initial €16.35 million plus €3 million in possible add-ons)	2022	
7	(Serbia) Miralem Sulejmani	(Netherlands) Heerenveen	(Netherlands) Ajax	Midfielder	16.25	2008	
8	(Netherlands) Daley Blind	(England) Manchester United	(Netherlands) Ajax	Defender	16 (Note: Initial €16 million plus €4.5 million in possible add-ons)	2018	
9	(Georgia (country)) Georges Mikautadze	(France) Metz	(Netherlands) Ajax	Forward	16 (Note: Initial €16 million plus €3 million in possible add-ons)	2023	
10	(Brazil) Antony	(Brazil) São Paulo	(Netherlands) Ajax	Midfielder	15.75 (Note: Initial €15.75 million plus €6 million in possible add-ons)	2020	

=== Outgoing transfers ===
Highest transfer payments received by Dutch football clubs. The majority of transfer fees listed are not officially disclosed by the trading clubs and are reported by reliable mainstream media. Different media outlets may report varying transfer fees. The transfer fees are ranked in Euro's (€) without accounting for add-ons, with fees that include add-ons signified by a note.

==== Women ====
As of 2 August 2026

Top 10 most expensive outgoing transfers for a Dutch club
Rank	Player	From	To	Position	Fee (Note: When there are two or more transfers of the same value, the earliest signing ranks higher) (€ thousand)	Year	Ref.
1	(Netherlands) Nina Nijstad	(Netherlands) PSV	(United States) Portland Thorns	Midfielder	600	2026	
2	(Netherlands) Lotte Keukelaar	(Netherlands) Ajax	(Spain) Real Madrid	Forward	500	2025	
3	(United States) Lily Yohannes	(Netherlands) Ajax	(France) OL Lyonnes	Midfielder	450	2025	
4	(Netherlands) Nikée van Dijk	(Netherlands) Twente	(Italy) Internazionale	Forward	450	2025	
5	(Netherlands) Victoria Pelova	(Netherlands) Ajax	(England) Arsenal	Midfielder	100	2023	
6	(Netherlands) Wieke Kaptein	(Netherlands) Twente	(England) Chelsea	Midfielder	100 (Note: Initial €100 thousand plus €30 to €50 thousand in possible add-ons)	2023	
7	(Netherlands) Fenna Kalma	(Netherlands) Twente	(Germany) Wolfsburg	Forward	80 (Note: Initial €80 thousand plus €20 thousand in possible add-ons)	2023	
8	(Netherlands) Chasity Grant	(Netherlands) Ajax	(England) Aston Villa	Midfielder	80	2024	
9	(Netherlands) Joëlle Smits	(Netherlands) PSV	(Germany) Wolfsburg	Forward	50	2021	
10	(Netherlands) Kika van Es	(Netherlands) Ajax	(England) Everton	Defender	35 (Note: Initial €35 thousand plus €15 thousand in possible add-ons)	2019	

==== Men ====
As of 2 August 2026

Top 10 most expensive outgoing transfers for a Dutch club
Rank	Player	From	To	Position	Fee (Note: When there are two or more transfers of the same value, the earliest signing ranks higher) (€ million)	Year	Ref.
1	(Brazil) Antony	(Netherlands) Ajax	(England) Manchester United	Midfielder	95 (Note: Initial €95 million plus €5 million in possible add-ons)	2022	
2	(Netherlands) Frenkie de Jong	(Netherlands) Ajax	(Spain) Barcelona	Midfielder	75 (Note: Initial €75 million plus €11 million in possible add-ons)	2019	
3	(Netherlands) Matthijs de Ligt	(Netherlands) Ajax	(Italy) Juventus	Defender	75 (Note: Initial €75 million plus €10.5 million in possible add-ons)	2019	
4	(Argentina) Lisandro Martínez	(Netherlands) Ajax	(England) Manchester United	Defender	57.37 (Note: Initial €57.37 million plus €10 million in possible add-ons)	2022	
5	(Mexico) Hirving Lozano	(Netherlands) PSV	(Italy) Napoli	Midfielder	45 (Note: Initial €45 million plus €5 million in possible add-ons)	2019	
6	(Netherlands) Jorrel Hato	(Netherlands) Ajax	(England) Chelsea	Defender	44.18	2025	
7	(Netherlands) Cody Gakpo	(Netherlands) PSV	(England) Liverpool	Forward	42 (Note: Initial €42 million plus €8 to €13 million in possible add-ons)	2022	
8	(Ghana) Mohammed Kudus	(Netherlands) Ajax	(England) West Ham United	Midfielder	41.5 (Note: Initial €41.5 million plus €3 million in possible add-ons)	2023	
9	(Colombia) Davinson Sánchez	(Netherlands) Ajax	(England) Tottenham Hotspur	Defender	40 (Note: Initial €40 million plus €2 million in possible add-ons)	2017	
10	(Netherlands) Jurriën Timber	(Netherlands) Ajax	(England) Arsenal	Defender	40 (Note: Initial €40 million plus €5 million in possible add-ons)	2023	

== See also ==
- List of most expensive women's association football transfers
- List of most expensive association football transfers
- Vrouwen Eredivisie
- Eredivisie
- Women's football in the Netherlands
- Football in the Netherlands
