= 2005 Amsterdam Tournament =

International football competition

The LG Amsterdam Tournament 2005 was a pre-season football tournament contested by Ajax, Arsenal, Boca Juniors and Porto on 29 and 31 July 2005 at the Amsterdam Arena.

== Table ==
| Team | Pld | W | D | L | GF | GA | GD | Pts |
|---|---|---|---|---|---|---|---|---|
| (England) Arsenal | 2 | 2 | 0 | 0 | 3 | 1 | +2 | 9 |
| (Portugal) Porto | 2 | 1 | 0 | 1 | 3 | 2 | +1 | 6 |
| (Argentina) Boca Juniors | 2 | 1 | 0 | 1 | 1 | 2 | -1 | 4 |
| (Netherlands) Ajax | 2 | 0 | 0 | 2 | 0 | 2 | -2 | 0 |

NB: An extra point is awarded for each goal scored.

== Results ==
=== Day 1 ===
2005-07-29

| Boca Juniors (Argentina) | 0 – 2 | (Portugal) Porto |
|---|---|---|
| | | Postiga 19'; Jorginho 72' |

Amsterdam Arena, Amsterdam
Attendance: 35,000
Referee: Jan Wegereef (Netherlands)

2005-07-29

| Ajax (Netherlands) | 0 – 1 | (England) Arsenal |
|---|---|---|
| | | Lupoli 87' |

Amsterdam Arena, Amsterdam
Attendance: 35,000
Referee: Dick van Egmond (Netherlands)

=== Day 2 ===
2005-07-31

| Arsenal (England) | 2 – 1 | (Portugal) Porto |
|---|---|---|
| Ljungberg 49', 58' | | López 37' |

Amsterdam Arena, Amsterdam
Referee: Ruud Bossen (Netherlands)

2005-07-31

| Ajax (Netherlands) | 0 – 1 | (Argentina) Boca Juniors |
|---|---|---|
| | | Calvo 41' |

Amsterdam Arena, Amsterdam
Referee: Paul Allaerts (Belgium)
