= 2002 Amsterdam Tournament =

International football competition

The Amsterdam Tournament is a pre-season football tournament held for club teams from around the world, hosted at the Amsterdam ArenA. The 2002 tournament was contested by Ajax, Barcelona, Manchester United and Parma on 2 August and 4 August 2002. Ajax won the tournament for the second year in a row.

== Table ==
Team	Pld	W	D	L	GF	GA	GD	Pts
(Netherlands) Ajax	2	2	0	0	6	4	+2	12
(Spain) Barcelona	2	1	0	1	7	6	+1	10
(England) Manchester United	2	1	0	1	4	2	+2	7
(Italy) Parma	2	0	0	2	2	7	-5	2

NB: An extra point is awarded for each goal scored.

== Matches ==
=== Day 1 ===
2002-08-02

Barcelona (Spain)	4 – 2	(Italy) Parma
Geovanni 16'; Riquelme 33', 42'; Rochemback 45'		Di Vaio 30'; Marchionni 37'

Amsterdam ArenA, Amsterdam

2002-08-02

Ajax (Netherlands)	2 – 1	(England) Manchester United
Sikora 39'; Ibrahimović 75'		Scholes 78'

Amsterdam ArenA, Amsterdam

=== Day 2 ===
2002-08-04

Parma (Italy)	0 – 3	(England) Manchester United
		Giggs 23'; Verón 50'; Solskjær 55'

Amsterdam ArenA, Amsterdam

2002-08-04

Ajax (Netherlands)	4 – 3	(Spain) Barcelona
Mido 46' van der Vaart 60', 62'; Witschge 89'		Kluivert 10'; Saviola 40', 47'

Amsterdam ArenA, Amsterdam
