= Wesley Sneijder =

Dutch footballer (born 1984)

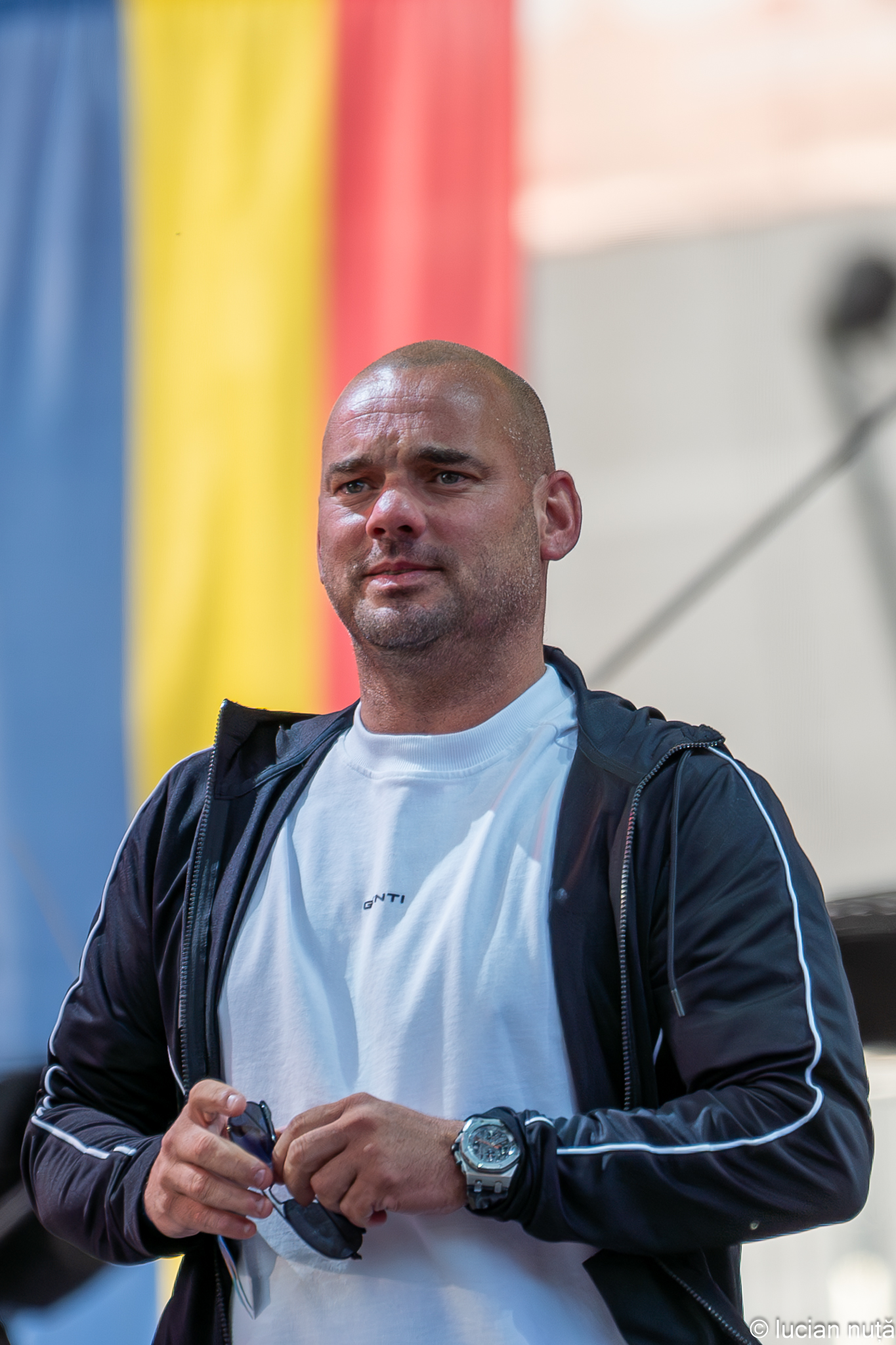
- Sneijder in 2025

Personal information
- Full name: Wesley Sneijder
- Date of birth: 9 June 1984 (age 42)
- Place of birth: Utrecht, Netherlands
- Height: 1.70 m (5 ft 7 in)
- Position: Attacking midfielder

Youth career
- 1990–1991: DOS
- 1991–2002: Ajax

Senior career*
Years	Team	Apps	(Gls)
2002–2007	Ajax	126	(43)
2007–2009	Real Madrid	52	(11)
2009–2013	Inter Milan	76	(13)
2013–2017	Galatasaray	124	(35)
2017–2018	Nice	5	(0)
2018–2019	Al-Gharafa	22	(15)
Total		405	(117)

International career
2000–2001	Netherlands U17	6	(2)
2001–2002	Netherlands U19	8	(3)
2003	Netherlands U21	1	(0)
2003–2018	Netherlands	134	(31)
Medal record
Men's football
Representing Netherlands
FIFA World Cup
Runner-up	2010
Third place	2014
UEFA European Championship
Bronze medal – third place	2004
- * Club domestic league appearances and goals

Wesley Sneijder (Dutch pronunciation: [ˈʋɛsli ˈsnɛidər]; born 9 June 1984) is a Dutch former professional footballer who played as an attacking midfielder.

A product of the Ajax Youth Academy, Sneijder started his professional career playing for Ajax, with whom he won four trophies and was awarded the Johan Cruyff Trophy in 2004. He was sold to Real Madrid for €27 million in 2007, winning La Liga in his first season with the club, and transferred to Inter Milan for €15 million in 2009. At Inter, he won Serie A, the UEFA Champions League, the FIFA Club World Cup, and two Coppa Italia. In 2010, Sneijder was named UEFA midfielder of the season, and one of the three best midfielders in the world by FIFA. After being sold to Galatasaray for €7.5 million in 2013, he helped the club win the Süper Lig in his first season, following with the capture of the Turkish Super Cup, after a 1–0 win against rivals Fenerbahçe. He had brief stints with Nice and Al Gharafa before retiring in 2019. Noted for his playmaking ability, he was considered one of the best midfielders in the world during his prime.

He appeared for the Netherlands in various youth squads and for the Dutch national team, making his debut in the senior squad in April 2003 at the age of 18. He then represented his country at the FIFA World Cup in 2006; in 2010, when they reached the final; and in 2014; and at the UEFA European Football Championship in 2004, 2008 and 2012. He was awarded the 2010 Bronze Boot, the 2010 Silver Ball, and was named to the team of the tournament for Euro 2008 and the 2010 World Cup, and as man of the match in six out of eleven games played by the Oranje at these two tournaments. With 134 caps, he is the most capped Dutch player of all time. He announced his international retirement in March 2018.

== Early life ==
Wesley Sneijder was born in Utrecht into a football family: his father and his older brother Jeffrey were both football players. His younger brother Rodney is currently also a professional football player.

== Club career ==
=== Ajax ===
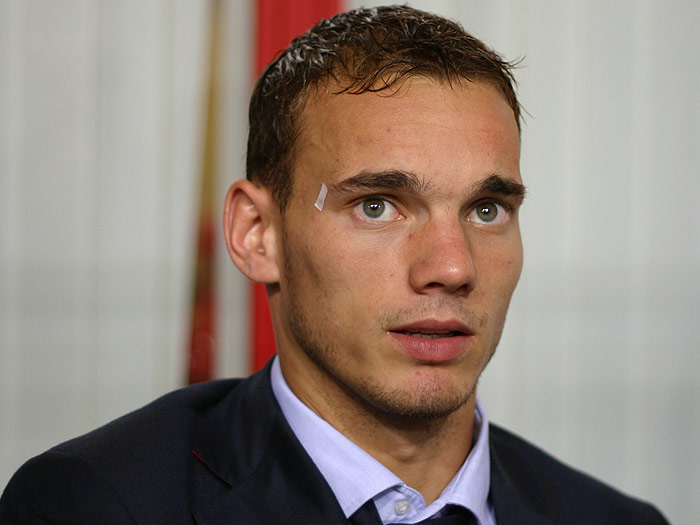
Sneijder during his time with Ajax

Sneijder moved to Ajax's famous youth academy at age seven after beginning as a youth player with local Utrecht club DOS. Following his older brother's footsteps, he signed for Ajax, initially on trial but subsequently impressed enough to be signed on a permanent basis. He first made the bench as an unused substitute for Ajax in a 2–0 win at SBV Excelsior on 22 December 2002 when manager Ronald Koeman, troubled by an injury-filled squad, called him up, advised by Danny Blind, the then-coach of the Ajax youth squad. On 2 February 2003, Sneijder made his official Ajax debut against Willem II in a 6–0 win. He quickly established himself in the first team, starting in the Champions League quarter-final match against A.C. Milan on 23 April 2003.

On 5 March 2003, Sneijder scored his first goal for Ajax in a 4–1 win over FC Groningen in the KNVB Cup. On 13 April, he scored his first Eredivisie goal against NAC Breda in a 3–0 win. He scored three further league goals in wins against Roda JC, RKC Waalwijk and De Graafschap. The following season, he scored nine league goals as Ajax won the 2003–04 Eredivisie title. Sneijder's performances saw him awarded the Johan Cruijff Prijs for the season's best young player in the Netherlands.

On 14 September 2005, he scored his first Champions League goal in a group match against AC Sparta Praha. Ajax qualified for the knockout stage, with Sneijder scoring again in a 4–2 win over FC Thun.

On 7 May 2006, Sneijder was in the starting line-up for Ajax in the KNVB Cup final, setting up Klaas-Jan Huntelaar's opening goal in a 2–1 win over PSV at the De Kuip stadium in Rotterdam.

During the 2006–07 season, Sneijder scored 18 goals in the Eredivisie and 20 goals overall. On 6 May 2007, Sneijder played for Ajax in the final of the KNVB Cup as the team defeated AZ on a penalty shootout.

On 12 August 2007, Ajax agreed to sell Sneijder to Real Madrid for €27 million, according to the club's website, making him the second most expensive Dutch football player at the time.

=== Real Madrid ===
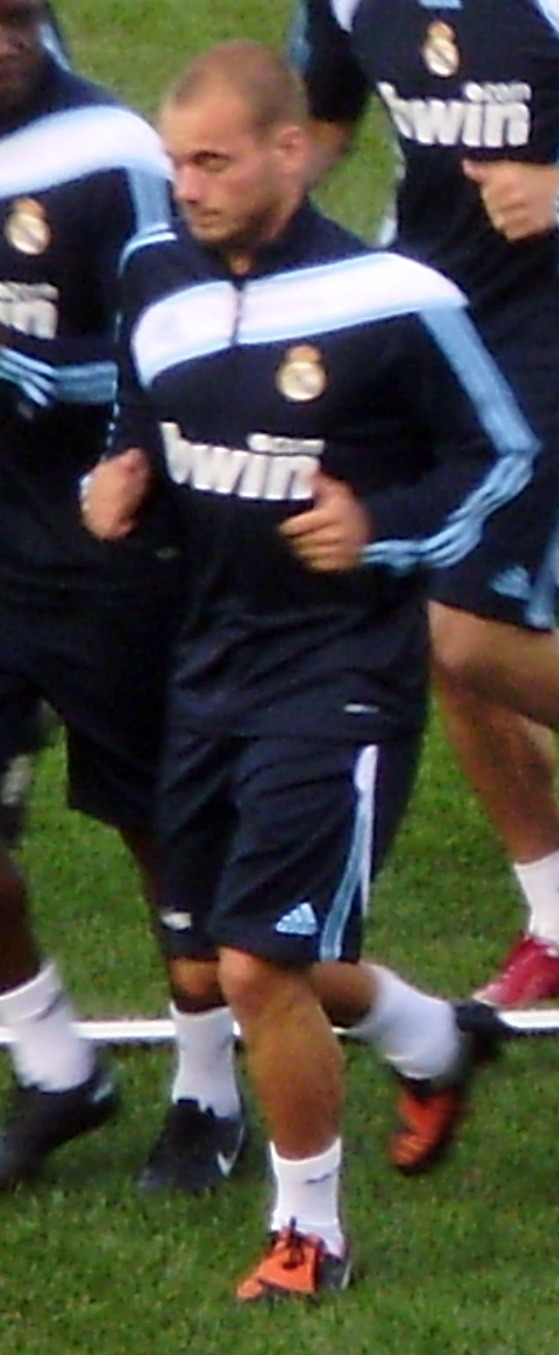
Sneijder warming up for Real Madrid in 2009

Sneijder was the second of three Dutchmen to sign for Real Madrid during the 2007–08 season, joining Royston Drenthe and Arjen Robben. He also was given the number 23, which had been previously worn by David Beckham for four seasons at Real. In his first La Liga match for Real, he scored the winner in the Madrid Derby against Atlético Madrid. On the second matchday, he scored two goals against Villarreal CF, one coming from a direct free-kick. Sneijder capped a fine first season in Spain by hitting a stunning free-kick in the last game of the season against Levante UD at the Santiago Bernabéu, taking his goal tally to nine in the La Liga season, a season which also saw Real retain their league title.

On 3 August 2008, Sneijder was stretchered off in a pre-season friendly at the Emirates Stadium, against Arsenal with a suspected cruciate ligament injury after a collision with Abou Diaby. Sneijder had an MRI which confirmed the extent of the injury to be not as bad as first feared. It was expected that he would be out for at least three months. He managed, however, to recover in time and was included in the starting XI for the Champions League clash against Juventus in Turin.

On 2 September 2008, AS reported that after Robinho's departure to Manchester City for €42 million, Sneijder would now be Real Madrid's new number 10. One day later, Real Madrid confirmed on their website that Sneijder would wear 10. His previous number, 23, was taken over by his fellow Dutchman and former Ajax teammate Rafael van der Vaart, whose preferred number is 23.

=== Inter Milan ===
==== 2009–10: Treble champions ====
On 27 August 2009, Sneijder was bought by Inter Milan from Real Madrid for a reported fee of €15 million. He was given the number 10 shirt and made his debut a day after he signed the contract, making an immediate impact by being on the winning side in the Milan Derby (4–0) against Milan. On 3 October 2009, he scored his first goal in the 92nd minute against Udinese in a 2–1 win. His second goal was scored on 24 October 2009 against Catania, directly from a free kick, and he scored his first Champions League goal for Inter in a dramatic 2–1 group stage win against Dynamo Kyiv in the 89th minute. His next goal was also scored off a hard-swerving free kick in a Coppa Italia game against Livorno.

On 9 January 2010, he scored two stunning free kicks against Siena in the game which Inter won 4–3. On 24 January, he received a straight red card in the Milan derby. On 6 April, Sneijder scored a free kick against CSKA Moscow in the Champions League quarter-final in the sixth minute, to give Inter a 2–0 aggregate win. On 20 April, he scored Inter's equalising goal during their Champions League semi-final first leg against defending champions Barcelona. He leveled the game by firing in right-footed from a Diego Milito pass. Inter went on to win the game 3–1 and the tie 3–2 on aggregate. Sneijder was given the nickname "The Sniper" by the media for his ability to deliver perfect passes and score from impressive distances.

On 22 May, Inter won the Champions League Final against Bayern Munich by a score of 2–0. Both goals were scored by Diego Milito, with Sneijder supplying the assist for the first goal. The Champions League was Inter's third trophy of the 2009–10 season after winning the Coppa Italia and Serie A titles.

==== 2010–11: Quintuple and individual success ====
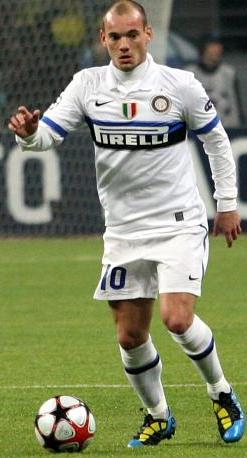
Sneijder playing for Inter in 2010

Sneijder commenced the 2010–11 season on 21 August 2010 by winning the 2010 Supercoppa Italiana with a 3–1 win over Roma. Five days later, he was named by UEFA as the best club midfielder of the 2009–10 Champions League. The day after, at Monaco's Stade Louis II, Inter lost to UEFA Europa League winners Atlético Madrid in the 2010 UEFA Super Cup with Sneijder playing 79 minutes.

He scored his first goal of the season in a 2–2 draw against Twente in the Champions League on 14 September, and followed that up with another goal in Inter's second game against Werder Bremen in a 4–0 win at the San Siro on 29 September. On 26 October, Sneijder was shortlisted for the 2010 FIFA Ballon d'Or award, eventually finishing 4th which Barcelona's Lionel Messi won. Only two days later, Sneijder signed a five-year contract extension with Inter, tying him to the club until 2015. President Massimo Moratti expressed his delight for the new deal, stating for the club's official website: "Sneijder became a key player for Inter last season and will be this year and for many years to come."

Inter finished second in Group A of the Champions League and were drawn against Bayern Munich (whom they had beaten in the previous season's final) in the round of 16. In the first leg, Sneijder and Inter were uninspired and lost 1–0 to a late Mario Gómez goal at the San Siro. On 15 March 2011, Sneijder helped Inter turn it around, scoring in the 63rd-minute leading to a 3–2 win (3–3 on aggregate, Inter progressing on away goals) at the Allianz Arena, booking a place in the quarter-final against Germany's Schalke 04. The first leg of that quarter-final ended 5–2 to Schalke. Sneijder also played in the second leg of the tie but could not prevent his team from losing 2–1 and 7–3 on aggregate.

==== 2011–12: Injury-hit season ====
Sneijder begun his third season in Inter colours in strong fashion, netting the opener with a free kick in the 2011 Supercoppa Italiana match against Milan. The match however ended in a 2–1 win for Rossoneri. In September, he injured his left thigh during the 3–1 away loss to newcomers Novara.

The Dutchman returned in action one month later, playing 66 minutes against Chievo and assisting Thiago Motta's header for a 1–0 win at home, the first of the season. His first championship goal came in the very next game where he scored the opener in an eventual 1–1 draw at Atalanta.

Sneijder suffered another injury later in November 2011 when he damaged his right knee's rectus femoris muscle during the warm-up before the start of the match against Cagliari. He was replaced by the youngster Philippe Coutinho who scored in the match. The injury forced Sneijder to miss the rest of 2011, returning in the field on 15 January as a late substitute for goalscorer Diego Milito in the derby victory over Milan.

Sneijder made his 100th Inter appearance on 26 February by playing the first half of a 1–0 defeat to Napoli. He then scored a brace against Udinese at Stadio Friuli to lead his team to a 3–1 win, also marking his first goals since October 2011. Sneijder concluded his third season as Inter playing by making only 20 league appearances, with the injuries making a big impact. The team finished sixth, conceding 55 goals, just five goals short of equalling their all-time worst concession in a single Serie A campaign. In Coppa Italia, he played two times as Inter were eliminated by Napoli, while in Champions League appeared five times in a round of 16 exit by Marseille.

==== 2012–13: Decline and departure ====
Sneijder's season begun on 2 August by playing against Hajduk Split in the first leg of 2012–13 UEFA Europa League third qualifying round. He scored the team's first goal of the season which contributed in a comfortable 3–0 away win. He was on the score-sheet again twenty-four days later in the season opener against Pescara (3–0).

Sneijder suffered another misfortune on 26 September as he was taken off after 26 minutes in the league game against Chievo. It turned out to be his last appearance for the team as he and the club didn't find a mutual agreement for the new contract. Despite recovering from the injury, Sneijder wasn't called up in the squad, with president Massimo Moratti describing it as a "technical decision" of the coach. The club offered him a contract running until 2016 with a wage of €6 million plus bonuses to €4 million which Sneijder, who earned around €14,7 million, turned down.

Sneijder left the club officially on 20 January in favour of signing with Turkey's Galatasaray, concluding his Inter spell with 116 games and 22 goals, also winning six trophies.

=== Galatasaray ===
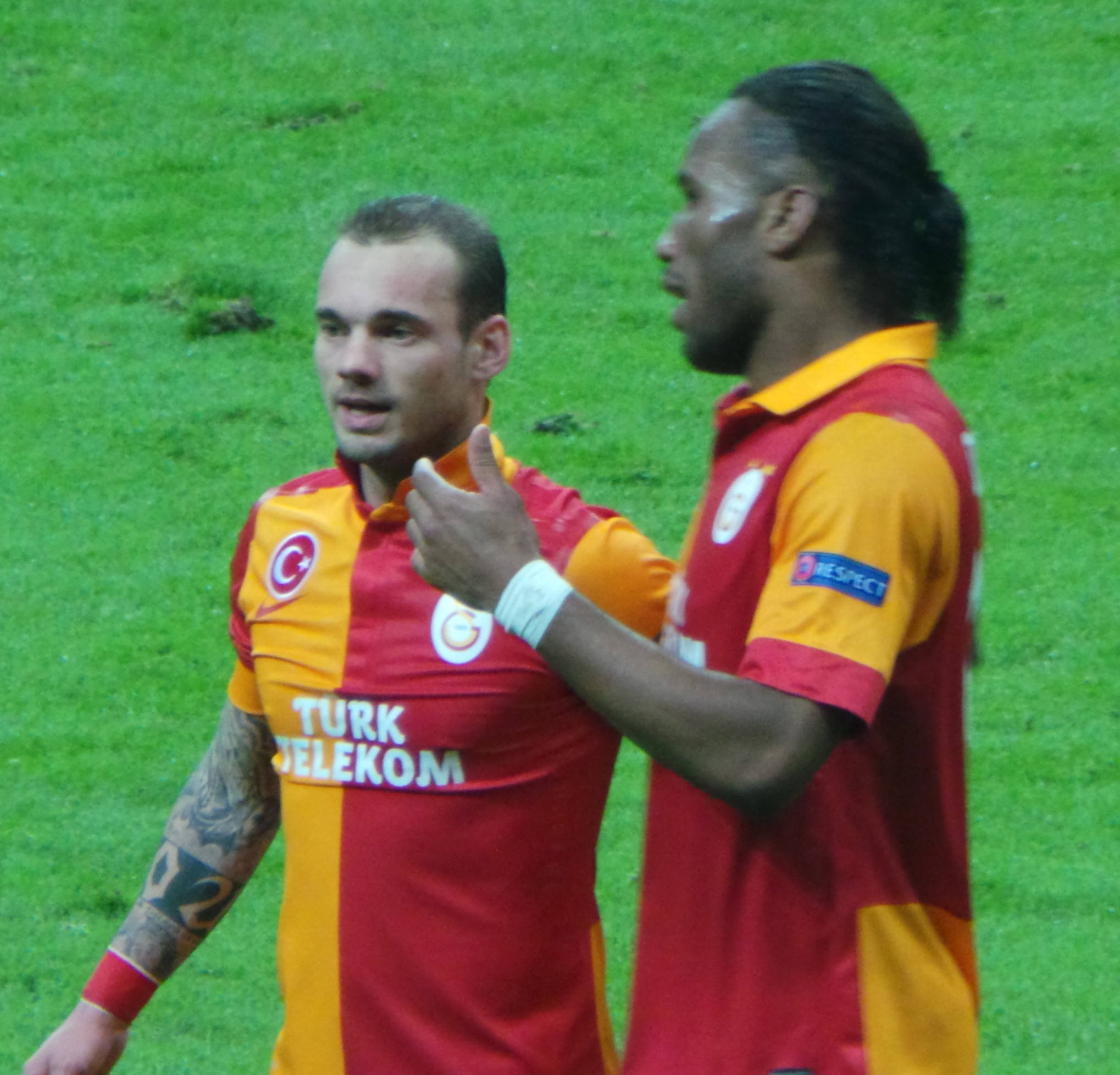
Sneijder and teammate Didier Drogba playing in 2013 against his former team Real Madrid in Champions League quarter finals game.

After reportedly falling out of favour with Inter due to contract renewal issues, Sneijder agreed a three-and-a-half-year deal with Turkish giants Galatasaray on 20 January 2013 for a fee of €7.5 million. Thousands of Galatasaray fans welcomed the Dutch international at the Istanbul Atatürk Airport as soon as Sneijder's exact arrival time was announced by the club on their official website. Sneijder signed the official contract on 21 January at the Türk Telekom Arena, home of Galatasaray. During the press conference, regarding the questions about Gala legend Gheorghe Hagi, Sneijder said, "He was a legend, and I want to become a legend." Later, he appeared on the club's official TV station Galatasaray TV, where he answered several questions about his transfer to Galatasaray and personal life. He also sent out a message addressing the Galatasaray fans: "Thank you for the support. I'm really proud, and I will make you guys even more proud. I'm happy to be here, and I can't wait to play my first game for you guys."

On 27 January, Sneijder made his debut, coming on as a substitute in a 2–1 win against rivals Beşiktaş. Sneijder received a warm reception when he replaced Umut Bulut. He scored his first goal on 25 February in a 4–2 home win against Orduspor, where he produced a finesse shot from the edge of the box, turning the game back on for the home side as Galatasaray were down by two goals. On 9 April 2013, Sneijder scored Galatasaray's second goal in a 3–2 win over his former club Real Madrid in the quarter-final stage of the Champions League. On 5 May 2013, Galatasaray beat Sivasspor 2–1 to win the 2012–13 Süper Lig, this gave Sneijder a league title in a fourth different country.

After using the number 14 shirt in his debut season with Galatasaray, Sneijder was given the number 10 shirt previously worn by Felipe Melo for the 2013–14 Süper Lig season following a squad number reshuffle. On 1 December 2013, when Galatasaray drew with Kasımpaşa Spor Kulübü, Galatasaray manager Roberto Mancini, in response to the question "where is Sneijder?" asked by reporters during a post-match interview answered, "Sneijder has left and I do not know where he has gone," while Galatasaray's official website had earlier informed the media on the reason for Sneijder's absence.

On 11 December 2013, Sneijder scored a late winning goal against Juventus in a 1–0 UEFA Champions League win to qualify Galatasaray for the knockout phase. On 2 February 2014, Sneijder scored a hat-trick in Süper Lig encounter against Bursaspor in a 6–0 win.

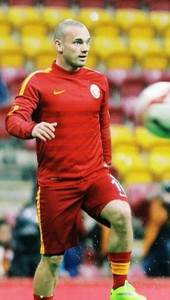
Sneijder during pre-match training at Galatasaray in 2015

On 6 April 2014, he scored his first derby goal against rivals Fenerbahçe, in a 1–0 home win. On 7 May 2014, Sneijder played a major part in the Turkish Cup final against Eskişehirspor, scoring the only goal of the game in the 70th minute and receiving the Man of the Match award for his performance.

Sneijder scored ten goals throughout the season during the 2014–15 Süper Lig campaign. By almost single-handedly winning many games for his team, he has been the man in the spotlight for Galatasaray in securing the league title. On 25 May, Sneijder celebrated the championship alongside Gala fans at the front yard of his residence after Başakşehir drew with Fenerbahçe, which brought Galatasaray the triumph. During the official title ceremony, Sneijder sang the famous Gala chant "Don't cry Fener" into the microphone in front of 52000 Gala fans.

Since his arrival, Sneijder has become the most efficient agent for the Lions regarding the Fenerbahçe-Galatasaray rivalry. He has scored three goals against Fenerbahçe in league matches in a year, which is more than enough for Galatasaray society to name a player a club legend. In the home game against Fenerbahçe, which was played on matchday 6, Sneijder sent out two long-range rockets in the 88th and 90th minutes, where Galatasaray claimed the victory against their bitter rivals. Overall, he has scored six long-range goals and three free kicks in league and cup games. In his 100th game for Galatasaray, he also scored the only goal against Gençlerbirliği on matchday 32, which helped the Lions stay at the top of the league table for the time being.

In the 2014–15 Turkish Cup, he also helped his team reach the final by providing three goals and three assists. Galatasaray won the final 3–2 against Bursaspor which was held in Bursa Atatürk Stadium on 3 June. Sneijder assisted the first goal off of striker Burak Yılmaz's hat-trick.

During Galatasaray's 2014–15 UEFA Champions League campaign, where they were knocked out at the group stage, Sneijder scored one goal–a late free kick against Arsenal at home–and made one assist. Sneijder was made vice captain of Galatasaray.

Sneijder began the season scoring the only goal for his team in the 35th Trofeo Santiago Bernabéu, where Galatasaray visited Real Madrid on 18 August. The game ended with a 2–1 victory for Real Madrid.

On matchday 3 of the 2015–16 Süper Lig in which Galatasaray visited Konyaspor, Sneijder scored two goals in the second half and led his team to a 1–4 away win, despite his side being down to ten men after Lionel Carole's 67th-minute red card, receiving prior to Sneijder's double.

On 3 October, Sneijder signed a three-year contract extension with Galatasaray. He immediately received a €1.3 million signing bonus, and his basic salaries in the 2016–17 and 2017–18 seasons would be €3.2 million, plus various bonuses.

On 14 July 2017, Sneijder and Galatasaray terminated his contract resulting in him becoming a free agent. Sneijder was reported to have released himself from the contract by buying himself out of the remaining period for €4.5 million

=== Nice ===
On 7 August 2017, Sneijder joined Ligue 1 side Nice on a free transfer. During his five-month stay at the club, he made 8 appearances and provided one assist to a Mario Balotelli goal in a UEFA Europa League match against Lazio.

=== Al-Gharafa ===
After getting released by Nice, Sneijder joined Qatari club Al-Gharafa. He made his debut on 12 January 2018, captaining the team and giving an assist in the league 2–1 win over Al Ahli Doha at the Hamad bin Khalifa Stadium.

On 12 August 2019, Sneijder announced his decision to retire from football, and begin working for FC Utrecht.

== International career ==
Sneijder made his debut for the Netherlands under-21 side against the Czech Republic on 28 March 2003. His first game with the senior Dutch side was against Portugal on 30 April that same year when he became the eighth-youngest player to play for the Netherlands in the first team's history. On 9 June 2017, he became the nation's most capped player of all-time when he made his 131st appearance in a 5–0 win over Luxembourg, surpassing the record which had previously held by Edwin van der Sar for 4002 days.

=== Euro 2004 ===
Sneijder reached the UEFA Euro 2004 semi-finals with the Netherlands. He began the competition mainly on the bench, and was subbed into two group stage matches: his team's first match against Germany and their third match against Latvia. He had also contributed two goals in the qualifying tournament.

=== 2006 World Cup ===
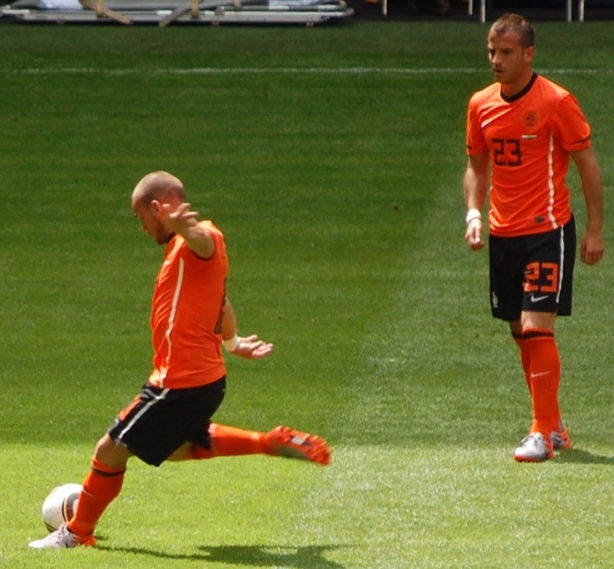
Sneijder taking a free kick while Rafael van der Vaart looks on

Sneijder started all four games for the Netherlands at the 2006 FIFA World Cup in Germany. He received one of the record 16 yellow cards doled out during the infamous Round of 16 clash with Portugal (titled the "Battle of Nuremberg") after pushing the Portuguese midfielder Petit to the ground during a brawl between Portuguese and Dutch players; Portugal went on to win 1–0.

=== Euro 2008 ===
In the build-up to Euro 2008, Sneijder scored a free kick in a friendly against Wales on 31 May, making it his second strike from a direct free kick in a row. The game ended 2–0 with a goal from fellow Real Madrid teammate Arjen Robben.

Sneijder marked his 24th birthday in style by scoring one of the goals of the tournament; the second goal in the 31st minute of the Euro 2008 match against the World Cup champions, Italy. Following Giovanni van Bronckhorst's goal-line clearance and subsequent run into the Italian half, Sneijder received a headed ball from Dirk Kuyt and volleyed it with an acrobatic strike past Gianluigi Buffon. This brought the score to 2–0 after Ruud van Nistelrooy's opener five minutes prior. The match finished with a 3–0 victory to the Dutch after a third goal was scored by van Bronkhorst after another run by him, following a crucial save from Edwin van der Sar. Sneijder's goal contributed to the Netherlands' first victory over Italy in 30 years, which was the biggest defeat Italy had suffered since Sweden beat them by the same margin in 1983. Many fans and pundits agreed that this goal was one of the best of the tournament. On 13 June, he scored another goal for the Oranje in the Euro 2008 group stage match against France: in the 92nd minute, from outside the box, Sneijder struck the ball into the corner of the net, bouncing off the crossbar on its way in. The match finished 4–1 for the Netherlands. Although the Dutch lost to the Russians in the quarter-final, Sneijder was named in the Team of the Tournament for his strong performances.

=== 2010 World Cup ===
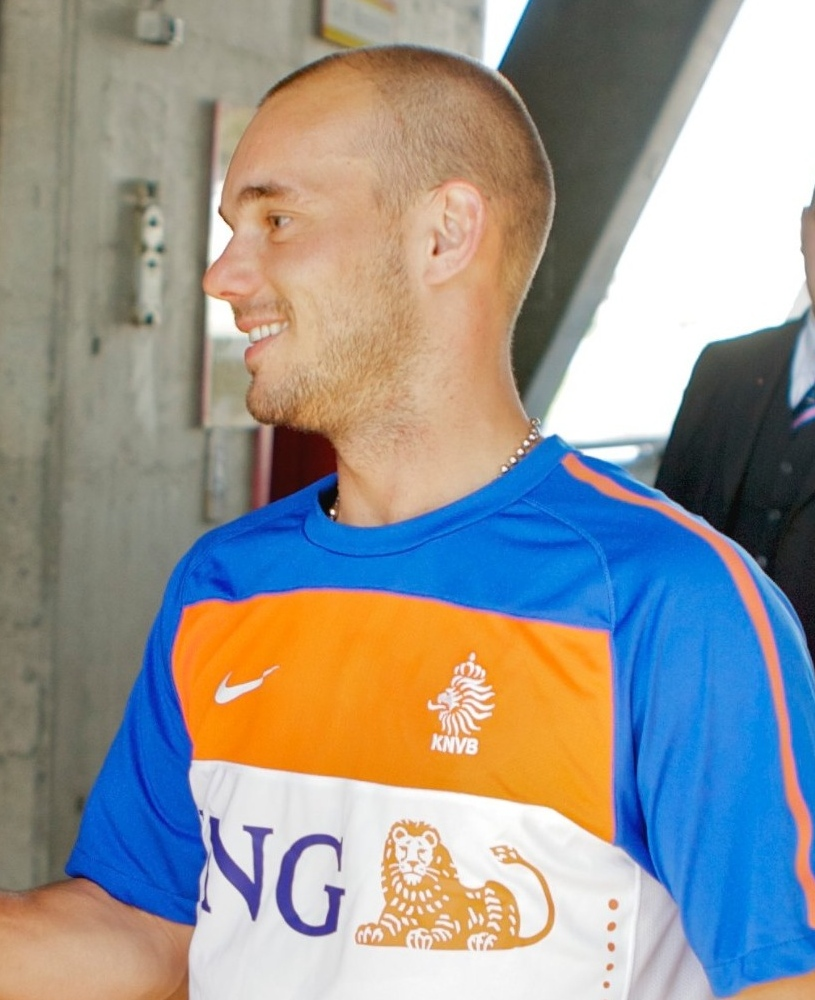
Sneijder the day before the Dutch team's departure to South Africa

Sneijder was in the starting line-up for their first match in the competition, a 2–0 victory over Denmark. He scored the winning goal in a 1–0 victory over Japan. In the first two matches of the group stage at the FIFA World Cup, he was selected as the man of the match in both. In the Netherlands' round of 16 match against Slovakia, Sneijder scored in a 2–1 victory. He also provided what was at first thought to be an assist for the first goal against Brazil in the quarter-finals, but was later credited with the goal. He then scored the first header of his career direct from a corner and consigned Brazil to a 2–1 defeat, bringing his goal total in the tournament to four. Sneijder was again named man of the match on FIFA's website.

In the semi-final against Uruguay, Sneijder scored in the 70th minute, taking his total in the competition to five, raising him at the time to first place in terms of goals scored, along with Spain's David Villa. The Netherlands won the match 3–2 and progressed to the final. Sneijder was yet again named on FIFA's website as the Budweiser man of the match according to the public online vote. In the World Cup Final, the Dutch lost to Spain 1–0 after extra time, conceding the only goal of the match after 116 minutes to Andrés Iniesta.

=== Euro 2012 ===
For Euro 2012, the Netherlands were in Group B, also known as the "group of death," alongside Portugal, Germany, and Denmark. Sneijder was deployed as an attacking midfielder as the Netherlands lost 1–0 and 2–1 to Denmark and Germany, respectively. Against Portugal, they lost again 2–1, with Sneijder playing on the left wing to see the Netherlands have an early exit from Euro 2012.

=== 2014 World Cup ===
In August 2012, after the retirement of Mark van Bommel, Sneijder was named as captain of the Netherlands. Less than a year later, however, he was replaced with Robin van Persie by coach Louis van Gaal.

Sneijder was named in the Netherlands' squad for the 2014 World Cup and made his 100th international appearance in the team's opening match, a 5–1 demolition of world champions Spain on 13 June. In the round of 16, Sneijder scored an 88th-minute equaliser, as the Netherlands recovered from a 0–1 deficit to overcome Mexico 2–1 in Fortaleza.

In the quarter-final, Sneijder scored the Netherlands' third penalty kick in a 4–3 penalty shootout defeat of Costa Rica. The semi-final match against Argentina was also decided by a shootout, with Sneijder one of two Netherlands players to have his kick saved by goalkeeper Sergio Romero in a 4–2 defeat. Sneijder was originally part of the Dutch starting line-up in the bronze game against Brazil, but he was replaced by Jonathan de Guzmán after an injury during the pre-match warm-up prevented him from playing.

=== Later years ===
Sneijder appeared in all of the 10 matches of the UEFA Euro 2016 qualifying campaign and in six of the 2018 FIFA World Cup campaign, which both ended in failure for the Netherlands. He announced his retirement from international football on 4 March 2018, holding a record 133 appearances for the national team. He made his 134th and final international appearance in a friendly match against Peru, at the Johan Cruyff Arena, on 6 September 2018; the match ended in a 2–1 home victory for the Dutch.

== Style of play ==
A creative and versatile midfielder, Sneijder was recognised as one of the classic playmakers of the 2010s. From his impeccable placement and confirmed ability to score from free kicks, Sneijder earned the reputation as a dead-ball specialist. Because of his short stature, he was quick and strong on the ball, and his passing range was enhanced by his ambidexterity; he was also renowned for his powerful striking ability from long range, with either foot. In addition to his vision and ability to create chances for teammates, Sneijder was also noted for his intelligence and great technical ability. Although he began his career in his preferred role as an attacking midfielder behind the forwards, he was capable of playing in several midfield positions and was also deployed on the wings or on occasion even up front as a second striker or main striker; in later seasons, he was usually played in the centre, as a deep-lying playmaker, due to his ability to dictate the tempo of his team's play in midfield with his passing, although he had stated that he did not favour this position. During the 2010 FIFA World Cup, he was also deployed in a new role which was later described as a false-10 or central winger, due to Sneijder's tendency to drift from the centre into a wide position when in possession of the ball. Despite his talent, he also drew criticism at times for his limited defensive work-rate as well as his lack of pace, and was also known to be prone to injury.

== Personal life ==
Sneijder has been married to Dutch-Spanish actress and presenter Yolanthe Cabau van Kasbergen since July 2010, although the couple are no longer together; he has two sons, one of them from his first marriage. Inspired by his wife and by Inter teammate Javier Zanetti, Sneijder converted to Roman Catholicism and was baptized in Milan.

Sneijder has two brothers: Jeffrey, a former footballer, and Rodney, a former Eredivisie player. In 2008, Sneijder blocked a summer transfer of Rodney to his own club at the time, Real Madrid. Wesley Sneijder said, "Real Madrid wanted him and Rodney was very happy about that. But when I heard [of it], I stopped the discussions. I am not in favour of juniors increasingly going to top clubs. I've told him that he first must make a breakthrough at Ajax."

During an interview in a radio station in Thessaloniki, Sneijder's brother Rodney confirmed that he and Wesley Sneijder (along with their other brother Jeffrey) have part-Greek descent, since their paternal grandmother was a Greek woman born in Kavala who moved to Utrecht before World War II.

== Awards ==
In October 2008, Dutch magazine Voetbal International conducted a poll to decide who was the best Dutch free kick taker. Sneijder received an overwhelming 70% of the votes, while Robin van Persie came second with 21% and striker Klaas-Jan Huntelaar was third with 3% of the vote. He was voted as the best player of the 2009–10 season by Goal.com.

== Career statistics ==
=== Club ===
Appearances and goals by club, season and competition
Club	Season	League			National cup (Note: Includes KNVB Cup, Copa del Rey, Coppa Italia, Turkish Cup, Qatari Stars Cup)		Continental		Other		Total	
Club	Season	Division	Apps	Goals	Apps	Goals	Apps	Goals	Apps	Goals	Apps	Goals
Ajax	2002–03	Eredivisie	17	4	3	1	3 (Note: Appearances in UEFA Champions League)	0	—		23	5
Ajax	2003–04	Eredivisie	30	9	1	0	7	1	—		38	10
Ajax	2004–05	Eredivisie	30	7	3	1	7 (Note: Five appearances in UEFA Champions League, two appearances in UEFA Cup)	0	1 (Note: Appearance in Johan Cruyff Shield)	1	41	9
Ajax	2005–06	Eredivisie	19	5	3	2	7	4	2 (Note: Appearances in Eredivisie play-offs)	1	31	12
Ajax	2006–07	Eredivisie	30	18	4	1	9 (Note: Two appearances in UEFA Champions League, seven appearances and one goal in UEFA Cup)	1	4 (Note: One appearance in Johan Cruyff Shield, three appearances and one goal in Eredivisie play-offs)	2	47	22
Ajax	Total		126	43	14	5	33	6	7	4	180	58
Real Madrid	2007–08	La Liga	30	9	2	0	5	0	1 (Note: Appearance in Supercopa de España)	0	38	9
Real Madrid	2008–09	La Liga	22	2	2	0	4	0	0	0	28	2
Real Madrid	Total		52	11	4	0	9	0	1	0	66	11
Inter Milan	2009–10	Serie A	26	4	4	1	11	3	—		41	8
Inter Milan	2010–11	Serie A	25	4	2	0	9	3	3 (Note: One appearance in Supercoppa Italiana, one appearance in UEFA Super Cup, one appearance in FIFA Club World Cup)	0	39	7
Inter Milan	2011–12	Serie A	20	4	2	0	5	0	1 (Note: Appearance in Supercoppa Italiana)	1	28	5
Inter Milan	2012–13	Serie A	5	1	0	0	3 (Note: Appearances in UEFA Europa League)	1	—		8	2
Inter Milan	Total		76	13	8	1	28	7	4	1	116	22
Galatasaray	2012–13	Süper Lig	12	3	—		4	1	—		16	4
Galatasaray	2013–14	Süper Lig	28	12	6	3	7	2	1 (Note: Appearance in Turkish Super Cup)	0	42	17
Galatasaray	2014–15	Süper Lig	31	10	6	3	6	1	1	0	44	14
Galatasaray	2015–16	Süper Lig	25	5	6	1	8 (Note: Six appearances in UEFA Champions League, two appearances in UEFA Europa League)	0	1	0	40	6
Galatasaray	2016–17	Süper Lig	28	5	4	0	—		1	0	31	5
Galatasaray	Total		124	35	22	7	25	4	4	0	175	46
Nice	2017–18	Ligue 1	5	0	0	0	3 (Note: One appearance in UEFA Champions League, two appearances in UEFA Europa League)	0	—		8	0
Al-Gharafa	2017–18	Qatar Stars League	11	9	0	0	6 (Note: Appearances in AFC Champions League)	2	—		17	11
Al-Gharafa	2018–19	Qatar Stars League	11	6	2	2	—		—		13	8
Al-Gharafa	Total		22	15	2	2	6	2	—		30	19
Career total			405	117	50	15	104	19	16	5	575	156

=== International ===
Appearances and goals by national team and year
National team	Year	Apps	Goals
Netherlands	2003	3	2
Netherlands	2004	14	3
Netherlands	2005	3	0
Netherlands	2006	10	0
Netherlands	2007	11	3
Netherlands	2008	10	3
Netherlands	2009	7	1
Netherlands	2010	15	7
Netherlands	2011	7	4
Netherlands	2012	10	1
Netherlands	2013	6	2
Netherlands	2014	15	2
Netherlands	2015	9	1
Netherlands	2016	6	1
Netherlands	2017	7	1
Netherlands	2018	1	0
Total		134	31

Scores and results list the Netherlands' goal tally first, score column indicates score after each Sneijder goal.

List of international goals scored by Wesley Sneijder
No.	Date	Venue	Opponent	Score	Result	Competition
1.	11 October 2003	Philips Stadion, Eindhoven, Netherlands	Moldova	2–0	5–0	UEFA Euro 2004 qualification
2.	19 November 2003	Amsterdam Arena, Amsterdam, Netherlands	Scotland	1–0	6–0	UEFA Euro 2004 qualification
3.	18 August 2004	Råsunda Stadium, Stockholm, Sweden	Sweden	1–1	2–2	Friendly
4.	8 June 2005	Amsterdam Arena, Amsterdam, Netherlands	Finland	1–1	3–1	2006 FIFA World Cup qualification
5.	17 August 2005	Estadi Olímpic Lluís Companys, Barcelona, Spain	Andorra	3–0	3–0	2006 FIFA World Cup qualification
6.	24 March 2007	Amsterdam Arena, Amsterdam, Netherlands	Russia	2–0	4–1	Friendly
7.	8 September 2007	Amsterdam Arena, Amsterdam, Netherlands	Bulgaria	1–0	2–0	UEFA Euro 2008 qualification
8.	17 October 2007	Philips Stadion, Eindhoven, Netherlands	Slovenia	1–0	2–0	UEFA Euro 2008 qualification
9.	1 May 2008	De Kuip, Rotterdam, Netherlands	Wales	2–0	2–0	Friendly
10.	9 June 2008	Stade de Suisse, Bern, Switzerland	Italy	2–0	3–0	UEFA Euro 2008
11.	13 June 2008	Stade de Suisse, Bern, Switzerland	France	4–1	4–1	UEFA Euro 2008
12.	9 May 2009	Grolsch Veste, Enschede, Netherlands	Japan	2–0	3–0	Friendly
13.	1 June 2010	De Kuip, Rotterdam, Netherlands	Ghana	3–1	4–1	Friendly
14.	5 June 2010	Amsterdam Arena, Amsterdam, Netherlands	Hungary	2–1	6–1	Friendly
15.	19 June 2010	Moses Mabhida Stadium, Durban, South Africa	Japan	1–0	1–0	2010 FIFA World Cup
16.	28 June 2010	Moses Mabhida Stadium, Durban, South Africa	Slovakia	2–0	2–1	2010 FIFA World Cup
17.	2 July 2010	Nelson Mandela Bay Stadium, Port Elizabeth, South Africa	Brazil	1–1	2–1	2010 FIFA World Cup
18.	2 July 2010	Nelson Mandela Bay Stadium, Port Elizabeth, South Africa	Brazil	2–1	2–1	2010 FIFA World Cup
19.	6 July 2010	Cape Town Stadium, Cape Town, South Africa	Uruguay	2–1	3–2	2010 FIFA World Cup
20.	9 February 2011	Philips Stadion, Eindhoven, Netherlands	Austria	1–0	3–1	Friendly
21.	29 March 2011	Amsterdam Arena, Amsterdam, Netherlands	Hungary	2–2	5–3	UEFA Euro 2012 qualification
22.	3 September 2011	Philips Stadion, Eindhoven, Netherlands	San Marino	2–0	11–0	UEFA Euro 2012 qualification
23.	3 September 2011	Philips Stadion, Eindhoven, Netherlands	San Marino	10–0	11–0	UEFA Euro 2012 qualification
24.	2 June 2012	Amsterdam Arena, Amsterdam, Netherlands	Northern Ireland	2–0	6–0	Friendly
25.	11 June 2013	Workers Stadium, Beijing, China	China	2–0	2–0	Friendly
26.	15 October 2013	Şükrü Saracoğlu Stadium, Istanbul, Turkey	Turkey	2–0	2–0	2014 FIFA World Cup qualification
27.	29 June 2014	Estádio Castelão, Fortaleza, Brazil	Mexico	1–1	2–1	2014 FIFA World Cup
28.	12 November 2014	Amsterdam Arena, Amsterdam, Netherlands	Mexico	1–1	2–3	Friendly
29.	10 October 2015	Astana Arena, Astana, Kazakhstan	Kazakhstan	2–0	2–1	UEFA Euro 2016 qualifying
30.	6 September 2016	Friends Arena, Solna, Sweden	Sweden	1–1	1–1	2018 FIFA World Cup qualification
31.	9 June 2017	De Kuip, Rotterdam, Netherlands	Luxembourg	2–0	5–0	2018 FIFA World Cup qualification

== Honours ==
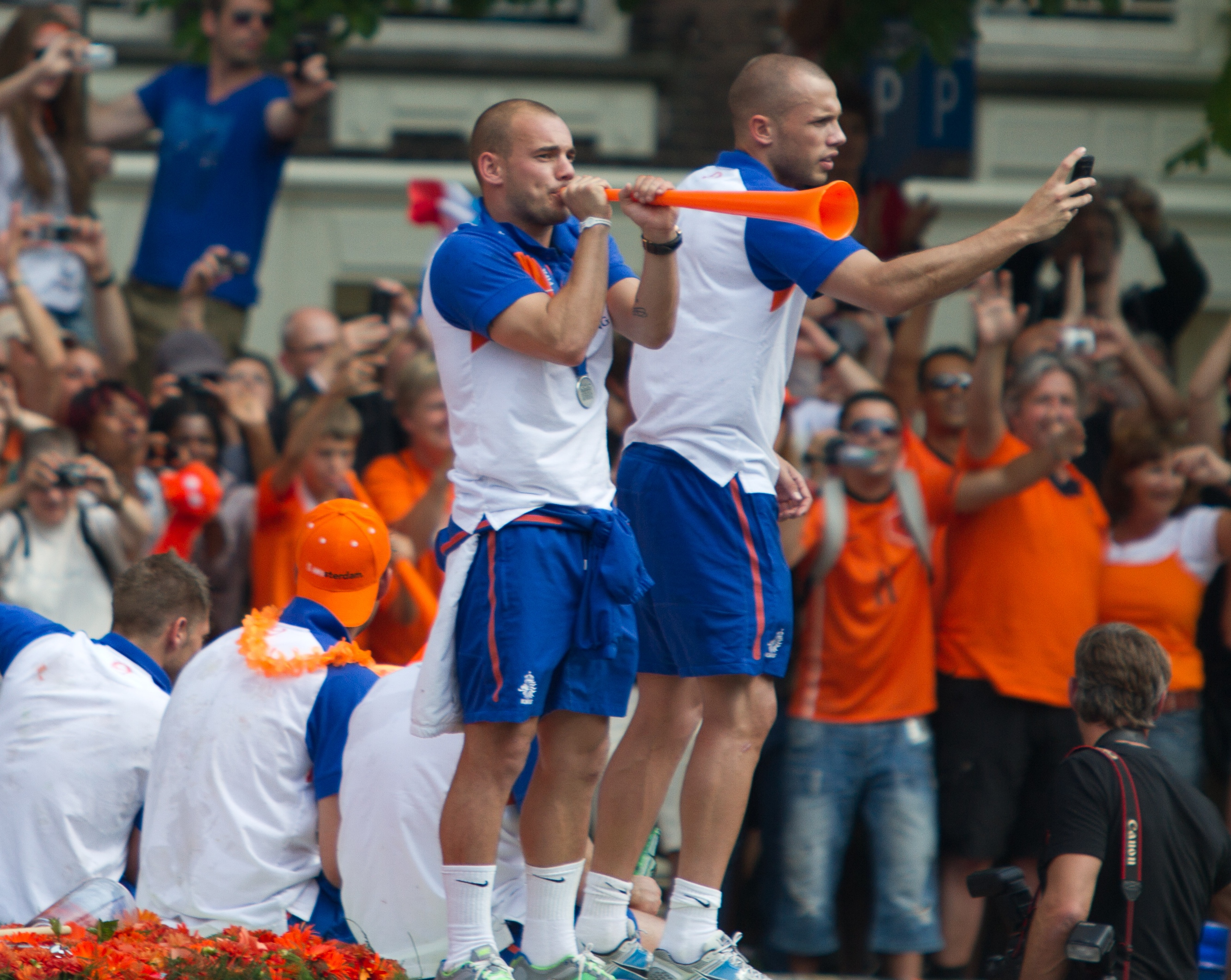
Sneijder (left, with a Vuvuzela) and John Heitinga were teammates at Ajax

Ajax

- Eredivisie: 2003–04
- KNVB Cup: 2005–06, 2006–07
- Johan Cruyff Shield: 2006

Real Madrid

- La Liga: 2007–08

Inter Milan

- Serie A: 2009–10
- Coppa Italia: 2009–10, 2010–11
- Supercoppa Italiana: 2010
- UEFA Champions League: 2009–10
- FIFA Club World Cup: 2010

Galatasaray

- Süper Lig: 2012–13, 2014–15
- Turkish Cup: 2013–14, 2014–15, 2015–16
- Turkish Super Cup: 2013, 2015, 2016

Al-Gharafa

- Qatari Stars Cup: 2017–18, 2018–19

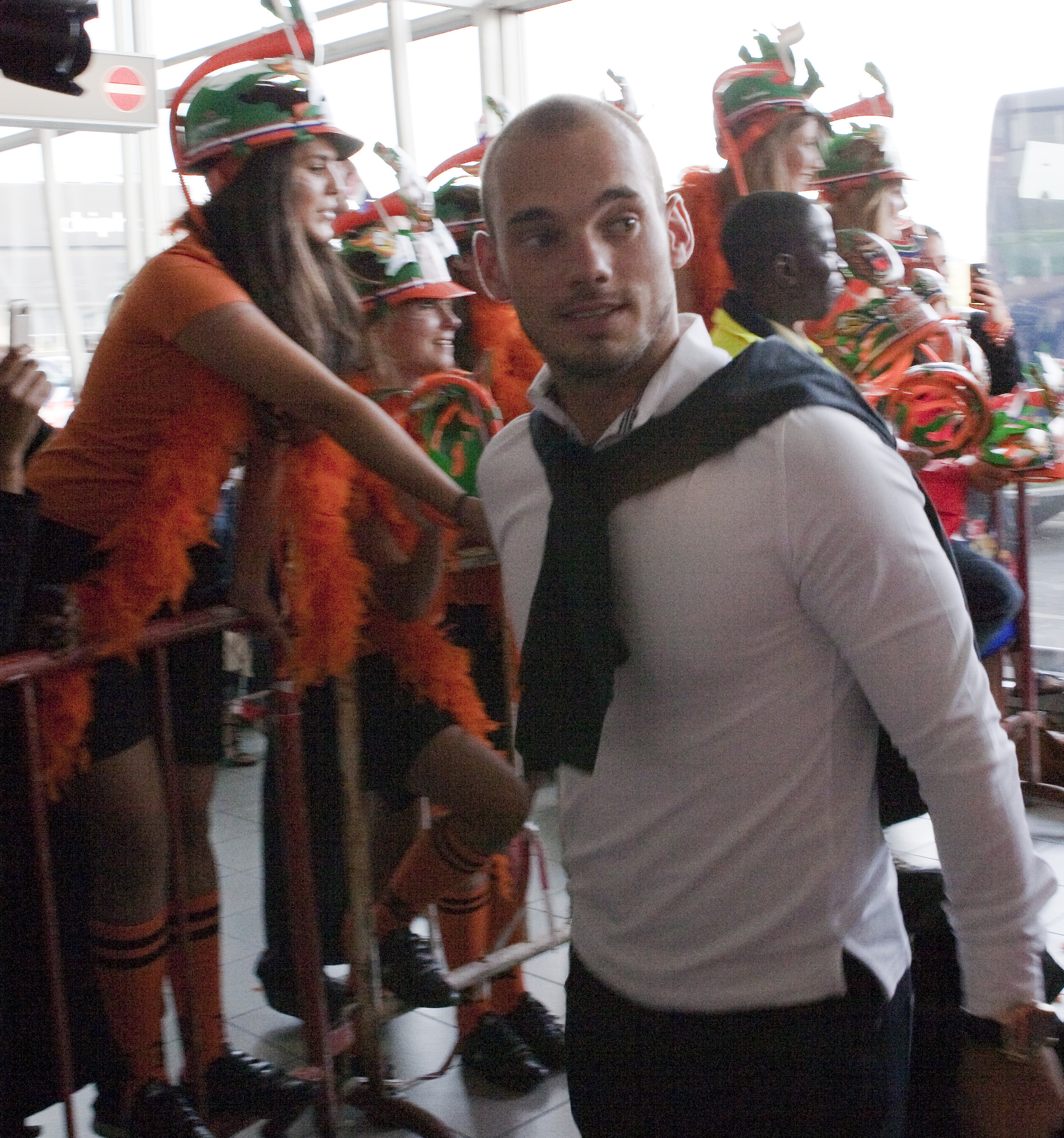
Sneijder at Schiphol departing for the World Cup

Netherlands

- FIFA World Cup runner-up: 2010; third place: 2014

Individual

- Ajax Talent of the Future (Sjaak Swart Award) 2001–02
- Johan Cruyff Trophy: 2004
- Ajax Player of the Year (Rinus Michels Award): 2006–07
- UEFA European Championship Team of the Tournament: 2008
- UEFA European Championship top assist provider: 2008
- UEFA European Championship Best Goal of the Tournament: 2008
- UEFA Champions League top assist provider: 2009–10
- UEFA Club Midfielder of the Year: 2009–10
- FIFA World Cup Silver Ball: 2010
- FIFA World Cup Bronze Boot: 2010
- FIFA World Cup All-Star Team: 2010
- FIFA World Cup Dream Team: 2010
- Goal 50: 2010
- FIFA FIFPro World XI: 2010
- UEFA Team of the Year: 2010
- ESM Team of the Year: 2009–10
- Süper Lig Best Foreign Player: 2014–15
- Süper Lig Team of the Season: 2013–142014–15
- Süper Lig top assist provider: 2016–17
- Inter Milan Hall of Fame: 2021

== See also ==
- List of European association football families
- List of footballers with 100 or more caps
- List of FIFA World Cup top goalscorers
