= 2001 Amsterdam Tournament =

International football competition

The Amsterdam Tournament is a pre-season football tournament held for club teams from around the world, hosted at the Amsterdam ArenA. The 2001 tournament was contested by Ajax, Liverpool, Milan and Valencia on 26 July and 28 July 2001. Ajax won the tournament for the first time.

== Table ==
| Team | Pld | W | D | L | GF | GA | GD | Pts |
|---|---|---|---|---|---|---|---|---|
| (Netherlands) Ajax | 2 | 1 | 0 | 1 | 3 | 2 | +1 | 6 |
| (Italy) Milan | 2 | 1 | 0 | 1 | 2 | 2 | 0 | 5 |
| (Spain) Valencia | 2 | 1 | 0 | 1 | 2 | 2 | 0 | 5 |
| (England) Liverpool | 2 | 1 | 0 | 1 | 2 | 3 | -1 | 5 |

NB: An extra point is awarded for each goal scored.

== Matches ==
=== Day 1 ===
2001-07-26

| Ajax (Netherlands) | 0 – 1 | (Italy) Milan |
|---|---|---|
| | | Rui Costa 13' |

Amsterdam ArenA, Amsterdam

2001-07-26

| Liverpool (England) | 1 – 0 | (Spain) Valencia |
|---|---|---|
| Litmanen 84' |

Amsterdam ArenA, Amsterdam

=== Day 2 ===
2001-07-28

| Valencia (Spain) | 2 – 1 | (Italy) Milan |
|---|---|---|
| Gonzalo 83'; Kily González 90' (pen.) | | Inzaghi 28' |

Amsterdam ArenA, Amsterdam

2001-07-28

| Ajax (Netherlands) | 3 – 1 | (England) Liverpool |
|---|---|---|
| Machlas 35', 57'; Arveladze 85' | | Fowler 38' |

Amsterdam ArenA, Amsterdam
