= 2003 Amsterdam Tournament =

International football competition

The Amsterdam Tournament is a pre-season football tournament held for club teams from around the world, hosted at the Amsterdam ArenA. The 2003 tournament was contested by Ajax, Galatasaray, Internazionale and Liverpool on 1 August and 3 August 2003. Ajax won the tournament for the third year in a row.

== Table ==
Team	Pld	W	D	L	GF	GA	GD	Pts
(Netherlands) Ajax	2	1	1	0	3	0	+3	7
(Italy) Internazionale	2	1	0	1	3	3	0	6
(Turkey) Galatasaray	2	1	0	1	2	4	-2	5
(England) Liverpool	2	0	1	1	1	2	-1	2

NB: An extra point is awarded for each goal scored.

== Matches ==
=== Day 1 ===
2003-08-01

Galatasaray (Turkey)	0 – 3	(Italy) Internazionale
Hasan Şaş (red card) 82'		Martins 37', 64'; Rebecchi 66'

Amsterdam ArenA, Amsterdam
Attendance: 42,000
Referee: Eric Braamhaar (Netherlands)

2003-08-01

Ajax (Netherlands)	0 – 0	(England) Liverpool
	Report

Amsterdam ArenA, Amsterdam
Attendance: 42,000
Referee: Ruud Bossen (Netherlands)

=== Day 2 ===
2003-08-03

Galatasaray (Turkey)	2 – 1	(England) Liverpool
João Batista 21'; César Prates 38'	Report	Heskey 36'; Mellor (red card) 85'; Gerrard (red card) 86'

Amsterdam ArenA, Amsterdam
Attendance: 35,000
Referee: René Temmink (Netherlands)

2003-08-03

Ajax (Netherlands)	3 – 0	(Italy) Internazionale
Pienaar 49' van der Vaart 56'; Wamberto 90+1'

Amsterdam ArenA, Amsterdam
Attendance: 51,000
Referee: Ben Haverkort (Netherlands)
