= 2004 Amsterdam Tournament =

International football competition

The Amsterdam Tournament is a pre-season football tournament held for club teams from around the world, hosted at the Amsterdam ArenA. The 2004 tournament was contested by Ajax, Arsenal, Panathinaikos and River Plate on 30 July and 1 August 2004. Ajax won the tournament for the fourth year in a row.

== Table ==
Team	Pld	W	D	L	GF	GA	GD	Pts
(Netherlands) Ajax	2	1	1	0	3	2	1	7
(Argentina) River Plate	2	1	1	0	1	0	1	5
(Greece) Panathinaikos	2	0	0	2	2	4	0	2
(England) Arsenal	2	0	2	0	0	0	0	2

NB: An extra point is awarded for each goal scored.

== Matches ==
=== Day 1 ===
2004-07-30
19:00 CET

Arsenal (England)	0 – 0	(Argentina) River Plate

Amsterdam Arena, Amsterdam
Attendance: 20,000
Referee: Jan Wegereef (Netherlands)

2004-07-30
21:15 CET

Ajax (Netherlands)	3 – 2	(Greece) Panathinaikos
Ibrahimović 54'; Sonck 62', 64' (pen.)		Maxwell 76' (o.g.); Konstantinou 82'

Amsterdam Arena, Amsterdam
Attendance: 30,000
Referee: Frank De Bleeckere (Belgium)

=== Day 2 ===
2004-08-01
19:00 CET

Panathinaikos (Greece)	0 – 1	(Argentina) River Plate
		López 21'

Amsterdam Arena, Amsterdam
Attendance: 40,000
Referee: Pieter Vink (Netherlands)

2004-08-01
21:15 CET

Ajax (Netherlands)	0 – 0	(England) Arsenal

Amsterdam Arena, Amsterdam
Attendance: 52,000
Referee: René Temmink (Netherlands)
