= List of F.C. De Kampioenen episodes =

F.C. De Kampioenen ('F.C. The Champions') is a Belgian-Flemish comedy television series of the VRT which was created by writer Luc Beerten, director Willy Vanduren and producer Bruno Raes. The series followed the adventures of several members of a poorly performing pub football team and their families. Here is an overview of the episodes. 21 seasons were released, each consisting of 13 episodes. In total, the series therefore comprises 273 episodes. A season of F.C. De Kampioenen is called a series. From series 1 to series 8, Dimitri De Tremmerie (DDT), portrayed by Jacques Vermeire, was the main antagonist. However, Vermeire switched to VTM (owned by DPG Media) in 1998. So, from 1998, the antagonist was Bernard Theofiel Waterslaeghers (BTW), played by Jakob Beks for two seasons, but due to the unpopularity of this character, he was replaced by Fernand Costermans, played by Jaak Van Assche. He remained the hostile neighbor from 2000 until the final season in 2011. The series aired on the Belgian-Flemish channel TV1, later Eén (now VRT 1), between 6 October 1990 and 26 February 2011. To mark the thirtieth anniversary of the series, Eén planned to broadcast eight new episodes in 2021. However, due to the death of Johny Voners (Xavier Waterslaeghers), the new season was postponed, and it was uncertain for a long time whether new episodes would be produced. Ultimately, it was decided to cancel the twenty-second season and instead produce a Christmas special in honor of Voners and the thirtieth anniversary. The Christmas special lasted an hour and a half and was first broadcast on 25 December 2020. The series is still regularly rebroadcast.

From approximately 2020, several episodes were removed from reruns because they contained problematic statements or outdated views, or because they featured guest actors convicted of sex offenses. On 26 September 2022, VRT decided to make the majority of the removed episodes available online again via the online media platform VRT MAX, but not to include them in the linear broadcast schedule. Broadcasts containing outdated imagery will henceforth carry a clear disclaimer to inform viewers that they may no longer align with the norms and values of Flemish society today. This allows viewers to decide for themselves what they wish to watch. The episodes are marked below with the symbol '*', while the episodes marked with '**' remain removed.

== Series overview ==
The table below shows the broadcast episodes and the average number of viewers per season. The most-watched episode is De sympathiekste from season 6 with 2,053,000 viewers. The final episode of the series, titled De mooiste dag, reached 1,697,876 viewers.

| Series | Episodes | Originally released | | Average live viewership |
| Series | Episodes | First released | Last released | Average live viewership |
|---|---|---|---|---|
| 1 | 13 | 6 October 1990 | 29 December 1990 | 1.091.000 |
| 2 | 13 | 5 October 1991 | 28 December 1991 | 1.627.000 |
| 3 | 13 | 10 October 1992 | 2 January 1993 | 1.722.000 |
| 4 | 13 | 2 October 1993 | 25 December 1993 | 1.725.000 |
| 5 | 13 | 3 December 1994 | 25 February 1995 | 1.681.000 |
| 6 | 13 | 2 December 1995 | 24 February 1996 | 1.794.000 |
| 7 | 13 | 7 December 1996 | 1 March 1997 | 1.719.000 |
| 8 | 13 | 6 December 1997 | 28 February 1998 | 1.429.000 |
| 9 | 13 | 28 November 1998 | 20 February 1999 | 1.197.000 |
| 10 | 13 | 27 November 1999 | 19 February 2000 | 1.027.000 |
| 11 | 13 | 2 December 2000 | 24 February 2001 | 1.020.000 |
| 12 | 13 | 8 December 2001 | 2 March 2002 | 1.141.000 |
| 13 | 13 | 7 December 2002 | 1 March 2003 | 1.291.000 |
| 14 | 13 | 6 December 2003 | 28 February 2004 | 1.277.000 |
| 15 | 13 | 4 December 2004 | 26 February 2005 | 1.300.000 |
| 16 | 13 | 3 December 2005 | 25 February 2006 | 1.076.000 |
| 17 | 13 | 16 December 2006 | 10 March 2007 | 1.374.000 |
| 18 | 13 | 15 December 2007 | 8 March 2008 | 1.376.086 |
| 19 | 13 | 13 December 2008 | 7 March 2009 | 1.221.026 |
| 20 | 13 | 19 December 2009 | 20 March 2010 | 1.381.000 |
| 21 | 13 | 4 December 2010 | 26 February 2011 | 1.372.796 |
| Kerstspecial | | 25 December 2020 | —N/a | 2.283.418 |

== Episodes ==
=== Season 1 (1990) ===
==== Main cast ====
- Danni Heylen (Pascale De Backer)
- Carry Goossens (Oscar Crucke)
- An Swartenbroeckx (Bieke Crucke) - 11 episodes
- Marijn Devalck (Balthasar Boma)
- Ann Tuts (Doortje Van Hoeck)
- Walter Michiels (Pico Coppens)
- Loes Van den Heuvel (Carmen Vandormael-Waterslaeghers)
- Johny Voners (Xavier Waterslaeghers)
- Jacques Vermeire (Dimitri De Tremmerie, DDT)

==== Regular guest actors ====
(Characters who appear multiple times throughout the series)

- Herman Verbruggen (Marc Vertongen)
- Greet Rouffaer (Marijke)
- Jenny Tanghe (Georgette "Ma DDT" Verreth)

==== Crew ====
- Willy Van Poucke (scenario)
- Peter Cnop (scenario)
- Frank Van Laecke (scenario)
- René Swartenbroekx (scenario)
- Luc Beerten (script editor)
- Willy Vanduren (director)
- Rik Daniëls (floor manager)
- Bruno Raes (producer)

| No. overall | No. in season | Title | Directed by | Written by | Original release date |
|---|---|---|---|---|---|
| 1 | 1.01 | "De nieuwe truitjes" | Willy Vanduren | Willy Van Poucke | 6 October 1990 |
We are introduced to the football team F.C. De Kampioenen and their neighbor and enemy, the garage owner Dimitri De Tremmerie (DDT). When another window is broken, DDT decides to take revenge. Using a mimicked voice for Pico, he telephones the opposing team to report that the match is cancelled due to the supposedly poor condition of the football field. Meanwhile, Boma has invited the press, as he has bought new jerseys for De Kampioenen. When it turns out that the match is not being played because the opposing team has cancelled, Boma invites the press into DDT's garage. There, he sees, is a van that he wants to give to De Kampioenen. This causes problems for DDT, because the opposing team had also ordered a van from him. Guest actors: Herman Verbruggen (Marc Vertongen) - Greet Rouffaer (Marijke) - Pol Goossen (Fons from the fire department)
| 2 | 1.02 | "Koopjes" | Willy Vanduren | Willy Van Poucke | 13 October 1990 |
Without Oscar's knowledge, Pascale buys an antique cabinet. Without Pascale's knowledge, Oscar buys a video camera. When the cabinet arrives, Pico unknowingly sells it to DDT for a bargain price. Xavier, who works in the army, borrows a jeep from the army to straighten out the targets. When the whole fuss surrounding the cabinet comes to light, the jeep temporarily ends up in DDT's garage. As a result, DDT gets into trouble with the military police.
| 3 | 1.03 | "Vogelvrij" | Willy Vanduren | Peter Cnop and Frank Van Laecke | 20 October 1990 |
Doortje and Pico are arguing about Pico's side job: repairing TVs. Pico spends too much time on football, causing his orders to often go unanswered. Doortje then has to deal with the dissatisfied customers because Pico isn't there. Meanwhile, Carmen and Xavier are arguing because Xavier has failed his army promotion exam yet again. Pico and Xavier decide to have a drink together at the canteen to escape their angry wives. From the canteen, they see that DDT is placing a large advertising sign for his garage along the field. They can't help but play a prank on DDT. Guest actors: Herman Verbruggen (Marc Vertongen)
| 4 | 1.04 | "Het record" | Willy Vanduren | Frank Van Laecke | 27 October 1990 |
Oscar catches Boma trying to seduce Pascale. Oscar becomes furious and says that he and the team don't need Boma or his money. To prove this, he has Pico attempt to break the local cycling record. Boma unsuccessfully asks DDT to sabotage the record attempt. Meanwhile, Marc's report on Radio Hallo goes wrong. Guest actors: Herman Verbruggen (Marc Vertongen)
| 5 | 1.05 | "Doortje" | Willy Vanduren | Peter Cnop | 3 November 1990 |
Xavier has arranged a match for De Kampioenen against an army team. However, Pico arrives in dirty clothes because Doortje refuses to wash his football gear. At the same time, DDT is looking for someone for the job of secretary. Carmen and Pascale encourage Doortje to take the job, as they believe women are supposed to be much more independent. Guest actors: Herman Verbruggen (Marc Vertongen, uncredited voice) - Bert André (Sergeant De Bock)
| 6 | 1.06 | "Transfer" | Willy Vanduren | René Swartenbroekx | 10 November 1990 |
Pico can sign a contract with a team in the first provincial league. Boma is negotiating with their manager, but Oscar is against the transfer; he considers Pico essential to the team. Bieke overhears part of the conversation and tells the rest of the team about the transfer. The manager has to give up another player in exchange for Pico. Meanwhile, Pascale increasingly sees the new player as the ideal man for her daughter Bieke. Guest actors: Alex Van Haecke (football agent Noël) - Dirk Tuypens (Raymond Van Keer)
| 7 | 1.07 | "Carmens wasmachine" | Willy Vanduren | Peter Cnop and Frank Van Laecke | 17 November 1990 |
Carmen's washing machine breaks down while washing the football jerseys. However, there is no money for a new one, and Oscar has to repair it. Carmen tells Xavier to find a side job, so he goes to work temporarily at DDT. He does ask for discretion, though, as he would rather the whole team didn't know he was working for the hostile neighbor. Meanwhile, Oscar has the washing machine repaired at DDT, meaning Xavier has to repair his own washing machine and even gets paid for it. Boma drops off a broken car radio at Pico's. However, Pico doesn't have time for it, so he takes the radio to DDT. This is how Pico finds out that Xavier is now working at DDT. Absent: An Swartenbroekx (Bieke Crucke)
| 8 | 1.08 | "De ster" | Willy Vanduren | René Swartenbroekx | 24 November 1990 |
Bieke is invited to perform on television. Boma decides to stop his sponsorship of F.C. De Kampioenen and use this money to develop his plans for an independent television station. To this end, he rents DDT's garage. All the players of F.C. De Kampioenen are allowed to apply to Boma's independent television station to earn money. Guest actors: Walter Van de Velde (postman Firmin) - Rudolf Vervliet (goalkeeper of the opposing team)
| 9 | 1.09 | "Crisis" | Willy Vanduren | Frank Van Laecke | 1 December 1990 |
The newspaper reports that F.C. De Kampioenen is unable to win another match and that coach Oscar cannot change anything about it. Marc interviews Boma, who states that Oscar will be fired if they do not win their next match. Pascale feels humiliated by this. Meanwhile, Doortje and Carmen involve Pascale in their plans to crack down harder on their men. De Kampioenen lose the next match and Oscar is fired. Out of shame for Oscar, Pascale moves in with Boma. Guest actors: Herman Verbruggen (Marc Vertongen) - Ed Jacobs (coach of the opposing team, credited as Eddy Jacobs)
| 10 | 1.10 | "Voetbalploeg zoekt trainer" | Willy Vanduren | Frank Van Laecke | 8 December 1990 |
Now that De Kampioenen no longer have a coach, Boma calls them together at Xavier's house. There, they decide to look for a new coach. Meanwhile, Oscar is depressed by his dismissal and Pascale moving in with Boma. He goes looking for a new team to coach. However, Bieke devises a scheme that leads to De Kampioenen and Oscar working together again in a match. They win, and Pascale subsequently moves back in with Oscar. He becomes the team's coach again, and the arguments are settled. Boma's chairmanship, however, has suffered some setbacks. Guest actors: Greet Rouffaer (Marijke) - Lucas Van den Eynde (player of the opposing team)
| 11 | 1.11 | "Het geld of het veld" | Willy Vanduren | Peter Cnop | 15 December 1990 |
Carmen and Pico discover that Boma wants to sell the field. Carmen and Xavier go to beg Pascale to use her charms on Boma so that he doesn't sell the field. Pico knows nothing of Carmen's plans and, in the meantime, organizes a demonstration for the field and against Boma. The big problem, however, is that Boma has already promised the field to DDT. Guest actors: Herman Verbruggen (Marc Vertongen) Absent: An Swartenbroekx (Bieke Crucke)
| 12 | 1.12 | "Verkiezingen" | Willy Vanduren | Frank Van Laecke | 22 December 1990 |
Pico argues that Boma can no longer remain chairman due to all the negative things he has done in the previous episodes. Almost everyone agrees, so elections are held to choose a new chairman. Pascale encourages Oscar to run, and Boma hopes to be re-elected. Meanwhile, the women find unusual filth among the players' laundry. They suspect DDT and go to ask him for an explanation. It turns out DDT is having a visit from his extremely strict mother. When she hears about the chairmanship election, she forces her son to run as a candidate too. Ultimately, Oscar wins, but he hands over his power to Boma. Guest actors: Herman Verbruggen (Marc Vertongen) - Jenny Tanghe (Georgette "Ma DDT" Verreth)
| 13 | 1.13 | "Omkoopschandaal" | Willy Vanduren | René Swartenbroekx | 29 December 1990 |
Carmen and Doortje want to buy new clothes. Meanwhile, Pico gives Doortje a voice recorder for her work at DDT. Through this voice recorder, they discover that DDT and De Kampioenen are involved in a bribery scandal. As a result, there is enough money for new clothes, but the bribery doesn't really work right away. Guest actors: Herman Verbruggen (Marc Vertongen) - Jan Pauwels (Mr. Bemelmans)

=== Season 2 (1991) ===
==== Main cast ====
- Danni Heylen (Pascale De Backer)
- Carry Goossens (Oscar Crucke)
- An Swartenbroeckx (Bieke Crucke) - 9 episodes
- Marijn Devalck (Balthasar Boma)
- Ann Tuts (Doortje Van Hoeck)
- Walter Michiels (Pico Coppens)
- Loes Van den Heuvel (Carmen Vandormael-Waterslaeghers)
- Johny Voners (Xavier Waterslaeghers)
- Jacques Vermeire (Dimitri De Tremmerie, DDT)

==== Regular guest actors ====
(Characters who appear multiple times throughout the series)

- Greet Rouffaer (Marijke)
- Vera Puts (Truus Pinckers)
- Dirk Vermiert (Sergeant De Kroet)

==== Crew ====
- Anton Klee (scenario)
- Eddy Asselbergs (scenario, credited as Collectief Foks)
- René Swartenbroekx (scenario)
- Frank Van Laecke (scenario)
- Luc Kerkhofs (scenario)
- Luc Beerten (script editor, E1–E12)
- Wout Thielemans (script editor, E13)
- Willy Vanduren (director)
- Rik Daniëls (floor manager)
- Bruno Raes (producer)

| No. overall | No. in season | Title | Directed by | Written by | Original release date |
|---|---|---|---|---|---|
| 14 | 2.01 | "Alleen is maar alleen" | Willy Vanduren | Anton Klee | 5 October 1991 |
DDT is looking for a woman via an advertisement. Xavier finds out about this shortly after DDT played a prank on him with his car. In revenge, Xavier pretends to be a woman over the phone to play a trick on DDT. Guest actors: Greet Rouffaer (Marijke) - Bieke Van Melkebeek (customer in the canteen)
| 15 | 2.02 | "Bekers" | Willy Vanduren | Collectief Foks | 12 October 1991 |
Under the leadership of Boma, De Kampioenen are organizing a football tournament with a challenge cup. At the tournament, Boma wants to present not only the challenge cup but also a Boma Sausage Cup for the best player. However, he has forgotten this cup, so Boma eventually gives Xavier some money to quickly buy a cup. This does not go smoothly, however, and Xavier decides to use a cup he won at a bird show. Guest actors: Hugo Danckaert (chairman of the cycling club) - Steph Baeyens (Leon De Wals)
| 16 | 2.03 | "Naar Amerika" | Willy Vanduren | René Swartenbroekx | 19 October 1991 |
Bieke gets the chance to go to America for a year. However, her parents don't readily agree to this; they find it too far away and it costs too much money. De Kampioenen organize a benefit match to raise funds for Bieke's trip. Unexpectedly, DDT manages to arrange a famous goalkeeper: Jean-Marie Pfaff is in goal for De Kampioenen match. Ultimately, Bieke goes to America. Guest actors: Greet Rouffaer (Marijke) - Vera Puts (Truus Pinckers) - Jean-Marie Pfaff (himself)
| 17 | 2.04 | "De streep" | Willy Vanduren | Frank Van Laecke | 26 October 1991 |
Carmen and Xavier are not admitted to the army ball because Xavier only holds the rank of corporal. Carmen forces Xavier to pass his promotion exam. Boma will try to arrange this by contacting Kolonel Vandesijpe. Eventually, Xavier becomes a sergeant with the clandestine help of Boma, Pico, Oscar, and DDT. Guest actors: Dirk Vermiert (Sergeant De Kroet) Absent: An Swartenbroekx (Bieke Crucke)
| 18 | 2.05 | "Carmen rukt op" | Willy Vanduren | Frank Van Laecke | 2 November 1991 |
Now that Xavier is a sergeant, Carmen is becoming increasingly arrogant. She wants to order a very expensive car from DDT and forces Xavier to switch to De Streepjes, the military football team. Coincidentally, this team is playing against De Kampioenen that same week. Guest actors: Carmen Jonckheere (Mrs De Bock) - Minneke Willems (Sylvie, Mrs Vandesijpe) - Jonathan Maxwell Reeves (football player) Absent: An Swartenbroekx (Bieke Crucke)
| 19 | 2.06 | "F.C. Toneel" | Willy Vanduren | René Swartenbroekx | 9 November 1991 |
De Kampioenen need more money for their coffers. So, they come up with the idea to perform a play for the benefit of the club. Meanwhile, Sabine (a niece of Pascale) comes to stay. Because Bieke is in America, her room is still available. Guest actors: Ann Esch (Sabine Dubois) - Koen De Bouw (Wouter Smeets) Absent: An Swartenbroekx (Bieke Crucke)
| 20 | 2.07 | "De vriendin" | Willy Vanduren | Anton Klee | 16 November 1991 |
Boma has a new girlfriend named Chantal de Graaf. They met in a stupid car accident. However, Chantal does not have very good intentions and wants to swindle money out of Boma. When she has her car repaired at DDT, she mentions that Boma might just sell the field to him. She really gets into trouble when she tries to seduce the men and angers the women. Guest actors: Martine Jonckheere (Chantal de Graaf) - Jos Van Geel (Jean-Claude) Absent: An Swartenbroekx (Bieke Crucke)
| 21 | 2.08 | "Bieke's auto" | Willy Vanduren | René Swartenbroekx | 23 November 1991 |
Bieke returns from America early. She immediately starts looking for a job and a car. Eventually, she starts working at the newspaper Publi-Time. Meanwhile, DDT has just bought a car that he wants to sell to Bieke for a much too high price. Doortje finds out about this and tries to warn Bieke. Guest actors: Guido Horckmans (Mr. Martin)
| 22 | 2.09 | "Operatie parkiet" | Willy Vanduren | Collectief Foks | 30 November 1991 |
Carmen makes it clear that she is thoroughly fed up with Xavier's parakeets. While Xavier is on mandatory training with the army, the little birds are staying elsewhere because he fears Carmen might harm them. Bieke offers to take the birds home. However, Pascale turns out to be allergic to the birds.
| 23 | 2.10 | "De ooievaar" | Willy Vanduren | Frank Van Laecke | 7 December 1991 |
Doortje becomes pregnant and goes to the doctor. Because of this, DDT thinks Doortje is being abused by Pico. Meanwhile, Doortje calls Pascale to tell her she is pregnant, asking her to keep it a secret for the time being. However, Oscar overhears part of the conversation, causing him to mistakenly believe that Pascale is pregnant. As a result, he gives Pascale extra care.
| 24 | 2.11 | "De controleur" | Willy Vanduren | Luc Kerkhofs | 14 December 1991 |
A tax inspector pays a visit to De Kampioenen. Boma manages to warn DDT just in time. Everyone is worried. Doortje is concerned about Pico's TV repairs. Oscar is worried about the Boma sausages bought on the black market, and Carmen fears for her undeclared work as a cleaner for Boma. In the end, the inspector turns out to be Bieke's new boyfriend, who also works illegally, causing him to drop all charges. Guest actors: Kurt Defrancq (Bob Vissers) - Aimé Anthoni (water meter reader)
| 25 | 2.12 | "Xavier gekwetst" | Willy Vanduren | Anton Klee | 21 December 1991 |
Boma is fed up with the team's poor defense and goes to complain to Oscar. He complains mainly about Xavier's poor performance as a goalkeeper. During a training session, Xavier accidentally kicks the ball into DDT's stomach. DDT furiously kicks the ball back at Xavier's head. Subsequently, Xavier falls against the goalpost and lies there for a moment. Afterward, Xavier acts as if he has lost his mind.
| 26* | 2.13* | "Verliefd" | Willy Vanduren | René Swartenbroekx | 28 December 1991 |
Boma is looking for a new player for De Kampioenen and is negotiating with the team KV Vlam for Tony Vanleer. Bieke turns out to have a new boyfriend about whom she doesn't seem to want to say much. This turns out to be Tony Vanleer. Tony is also going to work at DDT, even though he actually knows nothing about cars. Meanwhile, he is also seducing Doortje and Carmen. Ultimately, it all ends badly. Guest actors: Walter Janssens (Tony Vanleer) - Ronny Mosuse (footballer)

=== Season 3 (1992–1993) ===
==== Main cast ====
- Danni Heylen (Pascale De Backer)
- Carry Goossens (Oscar Crucke)
- An Swartenbroeckx (Bieke Crucke)
- Marijn Devalck (Balthasar Boma)
- Ann Tuts (Doortje Van Hoeck)
- Walter Michiels (Pico Coppens)
- Loes Van den Heuvel (Carmen Vandormael-Waterslaeghers)
- Johny Voners (Xavier Waterslaeghers)
- Jacques Vermeire (Dimitri De Tremmerie, DDT)
- Moestiek (Nero, Carmen's dog; E2–...)

==== Regular guest actors ====
(Characters who appear multiple times throughout the series)

- Vera Puts (Truus Pinckers)
- Achiel Van Malderen (animal doctor André Van Tichelen)
- Herman Verbruggen (Marc Vertongen)
- Agnes De Nul (Liliane Verhoeven, Councilor for Culture and Entertainment)
- Greet Rouffaer (Marijke)
- Ron Cornet (Colonel Germain Vandesijpe)
- Dirk Vermiert (Sergeant De Kroet)
- Jenny Tanghe (Georgette "Ma DDT" Verreth)
- Several babies (Billie Coppens)

==== Crew ====
- Frank Van Laecke (scenario)
- René Swartenbroekx (scenario)
- Luc Kerkhofs (scenario)
- Anton Klee (scenario)
- Wout Thielemans (script editor)
- Willy Vanduren (director, E1–E11, E13)
- Eric Taelman (director, E12)
- Rik Daniëls (floor manager)
- Bruno Raes (producer)

| No. overall | No. in season | Title | Directed by | Written by | Original release date |
|---|---|---|---|---|---|
| 27 | 3.01 | "De nieuwe Kampioen" | Willy Vanduren | Frank Van Laecke | 10 October 1992 |
Doortje is still pregnant and keeps mistakenly thinking she is having contractions. Meanwhile, De Kampioenen are playing an away match at F.C. Stomp. Oscar gets a headache because he is worried about the match. Meanwhile, Carmen also has to go to the hospital after hurting her toe while cleaning at Boma's. When Doortje suddenly goes into labor, they have to retrieve Pico from the match. Meanwhile, it turns out they still know Carmen at the hospital. Finally, Doortje gives birth to her son: Billie. Guest actors: Marlene Edeling (nurse) - Several babies (Billie Coppens)
| 28 | 3.02 | "Depressief" | Willy Vanduren | René Swartenbroekx | 17 October 1992 |
Doortje fakes postpartum depression to ensure that Pico cares about her. Then Carmen discovers that Doortje is actually faking it. This gives Carmen the idea to fake depression as well so that she can finally get a dog. She has been dreaming of this for a very long time, but Xavier is absolutely against it. However, Pascale and Bieke ignore Xavier regarding the dog discussion. Ultimately, Carmen gets her dog: Nero. Carmen and Doortje's battle for the best attention from their husbands goes completely wrong when they want them not to participate in the football match. Meanwhile, viewers find out why Bieke returned from America early in the previous season, which she kept hidden from her parents for a year. Guest actors: Vera Puts (Truus Pinckers) - Achiel Van Malderen (animal doctor André Van Tichelen)
| 29 | 3.03 | "De elfde man" | Willy Vanduren | Luc Kerkhofs | 24 October 1992 |
It is the annual fair in the village of De Kampioenen. Therefore, DDT is organizing an open house. He would actually like to have his garage painted, but DDT thinks this is too much work. Meanwhile, Pascale wants to wallpaper the living room to make a good impression on her sister Madeleine. Boma, meanwhile, has invited a councilor named Liliane Verhoeven to come and watch the match. Because some players cancel, De Kampioenen are down to only ten players and are therefore one man short. Naturally, Boma gets angry about this and promises to find an eleventh player himself. This turns out to be DDT. Guest actors: Herman Verbruggen (Marc Vertongen) - Agnes De Nul (councilor Liliane Verhoeven) - Several babies (Billie Coppens)
| 30 | 3.04 | "De schat" | Willy Vanduren | Anton Klee | 31 October 1992 |
DDT finds a briefcase with money along the field. He secretly steals it, but Bieke and Doortje see it. He forces Doortje to keep quiet, while Bieke thinks everyone should know. De Kampioenen claim the money, but DDT refuses to admit it. It turns out to be crime money, and a gangster threatens Oscar and DDT. Eventually, both defeat the gangster and the money is burned by the two, but at that very moment, the other members of De Kampioenen discover the true status of the money. In the end, no one has any extra money. Guest actors: Guy Segers (gangster) - Several babies (Billie Coppens)
| 31 | 3.05 | "Besmet!" | Willy Vanduren | Frank Van Laecke | 7 November 1992 |
Xavier is ordered by Sergeant De Kroet to transport a dangerous virus to the military hospital. He breaks down in front of DDT's door. Boma, who is stressed, happens to break down there too. Because of this, Doortje gives Boma, Xavier, and DDT a cup of her tea. When DDT secretly spills tea on the box containing the virus, smoke appears. Xavier, Doortje, Boma, and DDT think a toxic gas is escaping. Pascale also ends up in DDT's garage at that moment and is therefore 'infected' as well. The other members of De Kampioenen are notified, but they present this as big news, causing the army and journalists to be present. The people in the garage are placed in quarantine. Colonel Vandesijpe is present and even sleeps in the living quarters of the canteen. Oscar does not trust that Boma is with Pascale and fears that he is going to seduce her. He slips into the garage and catches Boma thoroughly seducing Pascale, but because of this, he is also 'infected'. The people in the garage start feeling sick and fear the worst. They think they are going to die; they forgive each other for their behavior and pranks over the years, including Oscar and Boma, and also DDT with De Kampioenen. Later, the panic turns out to be unnecessary, because the box containing the virus actually contains frozen lobsters. Xavier seems to be punished for this commotion, but it is revealed that De Kroet wanted to use the frozen lobsters for a secret party at the army's expense. Vandesijpe punishes De Kroet (but he is not fired), and Xavier gets off scot-free. When De Kampioenen wonder why they felt sick, it turns out DDT's eggs are the cause because they are past their expiration date. Because of this, the conflict between DDT and De Kampioenen continues. Guest actors: Greet Rouffaer (Marijke) - Ron Cornet (Colonel Germain Vandesijpe) - Dirk Vermiert (Sergeant De Kroet) - Several babies (Billie Coppens)
| 32 | 3.06 | "De haptonoom" | Willy Vanduren | Anton Klee | 14 November 1992 |
Boma comes into contact with a Dutch haptonomist named Pieter-Paul Peereboom. He promptly becomes Oscar's assistant. Peereboom wants to boost the team's morale. Meanwhile, Oscar is afraid of losing his coaching position again and refuses to participate in the psychological tests. DDT, meanwhile, is impressed by Peereboom's sales techniques and now wants to join in as well. Ultimately, everything goes wrong for Peereboom. Guest actors: Bert van den Dool (Dr. Pieter-Paul Peereboom) - Andreas Van De Maele (customer at DDT) - Walter De Donder (Mr. Schepers, uncredited)
| 33 | 3.07 | "Weekend aan zee" | Willy Vanduren | Luc Kerkhofs | 21 November 1992 |
Carmen wins a contest on Radio Hallo. She wins a weekend at the seaside for four people. Carmen decides to go with Pascal, Doortje, and Bieke. Now that the women are gone, the men organize a party in the canteen. However, Boma promises to bring a girlfriend along, but no one is free. So he calls an escort agency. At the same time, Ma DDT has sent a woman to DDT. Moreover, the women end up in the wrong place. Guest actors: Jenny Tanghe (Georgette "Ma DDT" Verreth) - Herman Verbruggen (Marc Vertongen, uncredited voice) - Isabel Leybaert (escort lady/dancer) - Anneleen Cooreman (Miss Marleen)
| 34 | 3.08 | "Stank voor dank" | Willy Vanduren | Anton Klee | 28 November 1992 |
De Kampioenen are suffering from an unpleasant odor. Xavier gets a headache and Nero has a runny nose. Just before that, DDT installed a new petrol pump. Everyone mistakenly thinks that DDT's petrol pump is the cause. Later, it turns out the stench is coming from Boma's meat company. Guest actors: Ray Van Campenhout (Frans Liebaert, Food Inspectorate)
| 35 | 3.09 | "Miss Knalpot" | Willy Vanduren | Frank Van Laecke | 5 December 1992 |
DDT receives a visit from a representative of an extremely important car brand. This representative proposes that he become a local branch manager. This would bring DDT a considerable amount of money, but the garage must first be expanded. So, the football field must be sold to him. They decide to pit the women against each other to sow discord. DDT does this by organizing beauty pageants. Guest actors: Arnold Willems (Mr. Colpaert) - Several babies (Billie Coppens)
| 36 | 3.10 | "Kiescampagne" | Willy Vanduren | René Swartenbroekx | 12 December 1992 |
Municipal elections are being held. Boma and Pico are candidates on different lists. Both are trying to get DDT on their side because he is the chairman of the polling station. Boma uses his Radio Hallo with Marc to run an expensive campaign, while Bieke enlists herself to create a more ordinary campaign for Pico. Bieke is absolutely opposed to Boma and tries everything to sabotage his campaign and expose the reality surrounding Boma's power and his dirty tricks. Pascale and Carmen, however, are on Boma's side. Carmen wants Xavier to support Boma as well, but he is rooting for Pico, which causes tension. Oscar cannot choose between his friend Pico and his boss Boma. After commotion at the polling booths, Boma appears to be winning the election. Pico accepts his defeat, but Bieke, of course, does not. Ultimately, the elections are declared invalid for various reasons, including the fact that a vote was cast twice by the same person (Carmen) and, above all, because DDT, as chairman of the polling station, allowed Xavier to vote with a blue ballpoint pen instead of a red pencil, which is not permitted. Guest actors: Herman Verbruggen (Marc Vertongen) - Dirk Denoyelle (imitator)
| 37 | 3.11 | "Tango d'Amore" | Willy Vanduren | Anton Klee | 19 December 1992 |
Carmen's birthday is coming up soon, and she expects Xavier to forget it, just like every year. This year, however, he hasn't forgotten, so he has secretly asked Doortje for tango lessons. The Tango d'Amore is Carmen's favorite dance. Doortje must keep quiet, because this obviously has to remain a surprise.
| 38 | 3.12 | "DDT niet OK" | Eric Taelman | Luc Kerkhofs | 26 December 1992 |
Business is tough for DDT. A large garage nearby is taking away many customers. Doortje is afraid of losing her job and gets misunderstanding that DDT attempted suicide, so she asks De Kampioenen to support DDT. However, De Kampioenen make plans about what they might do with the garage if DDT disappears. DDT is surprised by these events. Eventually, the misunderstanding regarding the suicide attempt comes to light, and DDT and De Kampioenen remain enemies.
| 39 | 3.13 | "Betrapt" | Willy Vanduren | Frank Van Laecke | 2 January 1993 |
Pico flirts with a colleague (Ria De Stekker) at his school ball. Doortje finds out and seeks comfort at Pascale and Oscar's at night, as she does not want to sleep at home. Pico is heavily drunk and looking for Doortje. However, he cannot find her, so Pico ends up sleeping on the sofa at Carmen's house. When Xavier comes home, he thinks Pico is in a relationship with Carmen. Eventually, that misunderstanding is cleared up and Doortje and Pico stay together, but it is not the last time in the series that Ria plays a dangerous role in their marriage. Guest actors: Several babies (Billie Coppens)

=== Season 4 (1993) ===
==== Main cast ====
- Danni Heylen (Pascale De Backer)
- Carry Goossens (Oscar Crucke)
- An Swartenbroeckx (Bieke Crucke)
- Marijn Devalck (Balthasar Boma)
- Ann Tuts (Doortje Van Hoeck)
- Walter Michiels (Pico Coppens)
- Loes Van den Heuvel (Carmen Vandormael-Waterslaeghers)
- Johny Voners (Xavier Waterslaeghers)
- Jacques Vermeire (Dimitri De Tremmerie, DDT)
- Herman Verbruggen (Marc Vertongen) (Note: Herman Verbruggen's role as Marc Vertongen became a leading role starting in the episode "Liefdesverdriet", but the opening credits (with Oscar Crucke and Pico Coppens and without Marc Vertongen) were retained until the end of this season.) - 6 episodes
- Moestiek (Nero, Carmen's dog)

==== Regular guest actors ====
(Characters who appear multiple times throughout the series)

- Achiel Van Malderen (animal doctor André Van Tichelen)
- Jenny Tanghe (Georgette "Ma DDT" Verreth)
- Several babies (Billie Coppens)

==== Crew ====
- Anton Klee (scenario)
- Frank Van Laecke (scenario)
- René Swartenbroekx (scenario)
- Jan Schuermans (scenario)
- Gerrie Van Rompaey (scenario, under the pseudonym Eva Lambert)
- Luc Kerkhofs (scenario)
- Wout Thielemans (script editor)
- Eric Taelman (director)
- Rik Daniëls (floor manager, E1–E6)
- Raf Coppens (vision mixer, E7–E12)
- Bruno Raes (producer)

| No. overall | No. in season | Title | Directed by | Written by | Original release date |
|---|---|---|---|---|---|
| 40 | 4.01 | "De motorfiets" | Eric Taelman | Anton Klee | 2 October 1993 |
Carmen's car is broken down again. When she sees a motorcycle in DDT's garage, she absolutely wants to buy it. Meanwhile, Boma has arranged a mascot for De Kampioenen: a little bear named Jefke. Subsequently, Carmen loses her motorcycle license on her very first day. So, Carmen sells the motorcycle back to DDT. Then Pico wants to buy it, but Doortje is against it. When he tries to prove that the motorcycle is safe, things go wrong. As a result, it ends up back with DDT. After that, Bieke buys the motorcycle, but it eventually ends up back with DDT. In the end, Boma buys the motorcycle, but it is stolen by a motorcycle gang. Guest actors: Ann Ceurvels (Sylvia) - Arthur Semay (motorcyclist) - Max Schnur (cyclist) - Marcel Hertogs (motorcycle thief) - Albrecht Wauters (police officer) Absent: Herman Verbruggen (Marc Vertongen)
| 41 | 4.02 | "F.C. Championettes" | Eric Taelman | Frank Van Laecke | 9 October 1993 |
After the men have lost yet another match, they are laughed at by the women. The men then challenge them to a match. So the women form their own football team (F.C. De Championettes) to show that they can play better football than the men. DDT sponsors the women's team and Pascale becomes the coach. Moreover, Boma temporarily replaces Oscar as coach for the match against the women. Guest actors: Truus Druyts (woman, possible member of F.C. De Championettes, uncredited) Absent: Herman Verbruggen (Marc Vertongen)
| 42 | 4.03 | "Verwisselingen" | Eric Taelman | Frank Van Laecke | 16 October 1993 |
Boma is looking for a secretary. Carmen is furious about this, because she feels she should get the job as a promotion. Doortje is no longer satisfied at DDT and applies to Boma. Pascale does the same. Carmen gets even angrier when she hears this. So Carmen goes to work as a secretary at DDT. Eventually, Doortje works back at DDT and Carmen at Boma. Guest actors: Several babies (Billie Coppens) Absent: Herman Verbruggen (Marc Vertongen)
| 43** | 4.04** | "Rode vlekjes" | Eric Taelman | René Swartenbroekx | 23 October 1993 |
De Kampioenen are plagued by fleas. When the parents of Bieke's new boyfriend come to visit, the fleas cause a commotion. Nero is wrongly suspected of being the cause, prompting everyone to disinfect their homes. The source of the vermin ultimately turns out to be DDT's sheepskins. Guest actors: Achiel Van Malderen (animal doctor André Van Tichelen) - Marilou Mermans (Irma Corthout) - Toon Brouwers (Willem Corthout) - David Verbeeck (Alain Corthout) Absent: Herman Verbruggen (Marc Vertongen)
| 44 | 4.05 | "De aanranding" | Eric Taelman | Anton Klee | 30 October 1993 |
There is a thief at work near De Kampioenen. Things get out of hand when the masked thief assaults Pascale. However, she escapes and gives the assailant a black eye. At the same time, DDT has an accident with a cuckoo clock, resulting in him getting a black eye. DDT is therefore immediately suspected by the men, and they try to unmask him. But then Pascale reveals to Bieke that the thief was wearing glasses that she managed to grab. Coincidentally, Boma was not wearing glasses the evening of the assault. He is suspected by Bieke, Carmen, and Doortje, and they prepare to catch him. DDT is sent to the canteen to be with Pascale and show that he is not the thief. The men catch him red-handed, but then Pascale reveals the possible real culprit. At the same time, Boma has to guard the canteen, but at that moment, the real thief/assailant turns out to be hiding there; he came to steal the money from the cash register and knocks Boma down with a bottle. The thief/assailant flees but is covered by the women, who think he is Boma and bring him back into the canteen just as the men are overpowering Boma. When the women see the real Boma, they remove their suspect's bag out of curiosity. The thief and assaulter ultimately turns out to be a lookalike of Boma. Only Boma, Pascale, and DDT's reactions are shown. Guest actors: Albrecht Mayens (assailant/thief/lookalike of Boma, credited as Albert Mayens) Absent: Herman Verbruggen (Marc Vertongen)
| 45 | 4.06 | "Cinema, cinema" | Eric Taelman | Frank Van Laecke | 6 November 1993 |
Gentil De Schepper, a former classmate and enemy of Oscar, reappears in his life at the canteen and also at DDT's garage. Gentil reveals to DDT that he once tried to steal the physics exam questions but was ratted out by Oscar, otherwise all his classmates would have failed the exam. Because of that incident, Gentil had to repeat the school year. Still holding a grudge against Oscar, he now wants to take revenge on him by revealing a secret of his to his friends. He plans to show De Kampioenen a video in DDT's garage in which it is revealed that Oscar was once supposed to play for the Red Devils during a match against Zambia but was dropped from the team due to a blunder (an own goal). Oscar, aware of the revenge plan and fearing for his reputation, finds a file belonging to DDT from the RINO (his old school) among his files. This reveals that DDT was a poor student who only received his diploma because his mother threatened the principal. Armed with this information, Oscar blackmails DDT into sabotaging the film screening, even though Gentil has already paid him for it. As a result, DDT is chased out of the garage by De Kampioenen, who think Oscar did a great job and DDT is jealous. In the ensuing chaos, Oscar throws the video containing DDT's file into the motor oil, destroying it. As a result, Oscar and DDT's secrets are never revealed, and Gentil is defeated again. Meanwhile, during the events of the episode, when Oscar and Gentil are sitting together in the restroom stalls due to an argument, Carmen hears them and thinks they are having an affair. Since then, she has had negative thoughts about the relationship between men. Guest actors: Jos Van Geel (Gentil De Schepper) - Ryan Pethrow (Stéphane, uncredited) Absent: Herman Verbruggen (Marc Vertongen)
| 46 | 4.07 | "Bieke solo" | Eric Taelman | René Swartenbroekx | 13 November 1993 |
Bieke is fed up with her parents and wants to move out. First, she asks Pico if she can come stay with him. However, Doortje disagrees. When DDT hears that Bieke is looking for a new place to live, he considers renting out an attic that needs renovating. However, she moves in with Carmen, but gets into conflicts due to her boyfriends (in this case, two) and her behavior, which makes Carmen feel offended. Eventually, Bieke returns to her parents, and things work out between her and Carmen. However, she has set rules that her parents normally do not approve of. At the end of the episode, when Bieke's two boyfriends visit her, Pascale and Oscar want to check on her, which confirms that the situation between her and her parents has not changed. Guest actors: Geert Loyens (Gino) - Kurt Loyens (Didier) - Several babies (Billie Coppens) Absent: Herman Verbruggen (Marc Vertongen)
| 47 | 4.08 | "Liefdesverdriet" | Eric Taelman | Anton Klee | 20 November 1993 |
Marc – the reporter from Radio Hallo – hears that Bieke and her newest boyfriend have broken up. Bieke is fed up with tough guys and says in Marc's presence that she would even consider a relationship with him now. So, Marc thinks about taking his chances with Bieke. He asks her father, Oscar, for help, but Oscar thinks it is about football and advises him to attack immediately. This backfires, with Oscar and Bieke finding out that Marc is in love with Bieke. Next, Marc plays a love song on the radio especially for Bieke. When Oscar realizes that Marc stands a chance with Bieke, he asks Xavier and Pico to sabotage this. Later, Marc asks Boma for help, but due to a misunderstanding, Boma thinks Marc is in love with Pascale and becomes hostile towards him. He later asks DDT for help, who advises him to ignore them to attract attention. He also asks Doortje for help, causing DDT to think that he is involved with Doortje as well. Meanwhile, Xavier and Pico give Marc bad advice to ensure it all fails. Oscar and Pascale also decide to have a chat with Marc together to talk him out of it. During this, it comes to light that Marc is studying to become a doctor, causing Pascale to suddenly see him as the perfect boyfriend for Bieke. Marc also makes mistakes with Carmen, causing her to become hostile towards him as well. Subsequently, Marc and Bieke go on a date, which seems to go wrong due to sabotage by Pico and Xavier, but when she catches them, she teaches them a lesson. Bieke finds out about the misunderstandings, and after Marc says he would be for her, they decide to get to know each other properly. Later, Marc visits the canteen, but the rest of De Kampioenen are hostile towards him until Bieke kisses him and reveals that they are in a relationship. This brings the misunderstandings to light, and De Kampioenen are friendly towards him again. Oscar is the only one who is against him, but he has to accept it.
| 48 | 4.09 | "Het jubileum" | Eric Taelman | Jan Schuermans | 27 November 1993 |
Oscar and Pascale have been married for 25 years. However, they both think the other has forgotten. As a result, they buy each other strange gifts out of revenge. Meanwhile, Bieke is preparing a surprise party for her parents' anniversary and simultaneously gets into an argument with her parents because she isn't allowed to go away for the weekend with Marc. DDT's garage is being used to prepare for the party. DDT agrees to this so he can eat the appetizers. In the end, everything turns out well at the party. Guest actors: Door Van Boeckel (salesperson with red hair)
| 49 | 4.10 | "De scheidsrechter" | Eric Taelman | René Swartenbroekx | 4 December 1993 |
DDT is taking a football referee course with the strict referee Charlie Degroot. When he receives his license, he gets a warning not to let himself be bribed. When De Kampioenen subsequently absolutely must win to avoid relegation in a match refereed by Degroot, DDT suggests talking to Degroot, claiming he knows him very well. This is, of course, in exchange for certain gifts. Pascale suggests to Oscar that they notify the football association with a set trap to prove that Degroot is corrupt. However, DDT made this up; Degroot is an honest referee. Bieke then asks Marc to do something similar, but to record the conversation. Meanwhile, Boma bribes DDT, but not to lure anyone into a trap. Pico and Xavier then propose the same thing to DDT with the same intentions as Boma. However, Doortje overhears this and, together with Carmen, sabotages Pico and Xavier's plan. Then Oscar, Marc, and Bieke team up and go to DDT with the intention of luring Degroot into a trap. However, this recording fails due to an oversight by Marc. Subsequently, DDT cancels Degroot. He calls the football association, and DDT becomes the referee for that match. Carmen and Doortje learn of this, however, thanks to a letter from the association intended for Boma. They immediately realize that Degroot is a fair referee and have him come to the match. DDT ensures that De Kampioenen win unfairly. Degroot then takes away DDT's license. The match is replayed the following week with Degroot as referee. The fridge, which served as a gift for DDT, is given to Marc and Bieke by Boma. Guest actors: Marc De Coninck (Charlie Degroot)
| 50 | 4.11 | "Radiosterren" | Eric Taelman | Anton Klee | 11 December 1993 |
Radio Hallo now has an extra hour of airtime. However, there are multiple candidates for that time. Marc promises the airtime to Bieke. DDT wants that extra hour to advertise his garage. Carmen wants to become a star, as always, and therefore wants that time too. Oscar, however, also wants all the airtime to make a program about football. Boma eventually turns it into a competition between these four. However, Oscar is too nervous, Xavier sabotages Carmen, and Marc ruins it for Bieke, causing DDT to win the competition. However, a manager calls Boma right after the competition to say that he will not pay for his advertising on Radio Hallo if DDT is allowed to do it for free. So Boma sees no other option than to make DDT pay. However, he refuses, meaning he will not use the newly available hour. Consequently, nothing extra ends up on the radio.
| 51 | 4.12 | "Here we come" | Eric Taelman | Eva Lambert | 18 December 1993 |
An English football team (Nottingham Hotspurs) wants to play a match against De Kampioenen. Everyone (even DDT) wants to go to England. A misunderstanding arises regarding the agreements and arrangements with the opponent due to DDT's frugality with letters. Eventually, the English come to Belgium. Guest actors: Jan Hongenaert (milkman) - Robert Sian (Nottingham Hotspurs player) - Mike Costerus (member of Nottingham Hotspurs, uncredited)
| 52 | 4.13 | "Love story" | Eric Taelman | Frank Van Laecke | 25 December 1993 |
Doortje is fired when Ma DDT arrives, and she takes her place as secretary. Oscar receives a visit from his father Amedee, who is a magician in his spare time. The cheerful man makes fun of Oscar. Ma DDT and Amedee turn out to get along well. They even start a relationship. However, DDT and Oscar do not want to become stepbrothers and sabotage the relationship, causing them to break up. This episode has two different endings. Ending 1 (aired 1x): Xavier is inspired by Amedee and wants to perform a disappearing act on Oscar, who is covered with a blanket. Xavier loses concentration when Bieke and Marc return after dropping Amedee off at the airport. Thanks to a prank question from DDT, he and Pascale learn that Ma DDT and Amedee are both in Tenerife and fear for a new relationship. Pascale calls out to Oscar, but he does not respond. When she removes the blanket, Oscar has magically vanished; only his hat and a few pints remain. Xavier is happy that his magic trick works, and Pascale is completely confused. This ending was received negatively due to the surrealism and had to be replaced. Frank Van Laecke devised the original ending as a kind of revenge for Carry Goossens leaving the series to work for VTM. Ending 2 (reruns + DVDs + streaming): Xavier's disappearing act fails. Ma DDT and Amadee have apparently both gone to Tenerife. There are fears that they are going to start a relationship again. Oscar then follows them to prevent this. He never returns to the series. Last episode of Walter Michiels (Pico Coppens): the character Pico has only a handful of lines of dialogue in this episode; the episode also marked the last acting work for actor Walter Michiels, who was fired after disrupting filming and drunkenness on set, never acted again, and years later regularly came into contact with the law. Guest actors: Jenny Tanghe (Georgette "Ma DDT" Verreth) - Roger Bolders (Amadee Crucke)

=== Season 5 (1994–1995) ===
==== Main cast ====
- Danni Heylen (Pascale De Backer)
- An Swartenbroeckx (Bieke Crucke)
- Herman Verbruggen (Marc Vertongen) - 12 episodes
- Marijn Devalck (Balthasar Boma)
- Ann Tuts (Doortje Van Hoeck)
- Ben Rottiers (Pol De Tremmerie)
- Loes Van den Heuvel (Carmen Vandormael-Waterslaeghers)
- Johny Voners (Xavier Waterslaeghers)
- Jacques Vermeire (Dimitri De Tremmerie, DDT)
- Moestiek (Nero, Carmen's dog)

==== Regular guest actors ====
(Characters who appear multiple times throughout the series)

- Jenny Tanghe (Georgette "Ma DDT" Verreth)
- Remco (Billie Coppens)

==== Crew ====
- Frank Van Laecke (scenario)
- René Swartenbroekx (scenario)
- Anton Klee (scenario)
- Jan Schuermans (scenario)
- Wout Thielemans (scenario and script editor)
- Eric Taelman (director, E1–E6)
- Dirk Corthout (director, E7–E13)
- Raf Coppens (vision mixer, E1–E12)
- Bruno Raes (producer)

| No. overall | No. in season | Title | Directed by | Written by | Original release date |
|---|---|---|---|---|---|
| 53 | 5.01 | "De nieuwe start" | Eric Taelman | Frank Van Laecke | 3 December 1994 |
Things have been going completely wrong for De Kampioenen since two members left the group. Pico turned out to have feelings for his colleague Ria De Stekker after all and left with her, as a result of which he is separated from Doortje and no longer has contact with her, Billie, and his friends. Oscar, who went to Tenerife in the previous episode of the previous season to prevent a possible relationship between his father Amedee and Ma DDT, has not returned. It is said that he converted to the Hare Krishna Movement and now lives in Kathmandu. Pascale accepts his decision and moves on with her life. (Later in the second film, it is revealed that Pascale was never officially divorced from Oscar until the day she married Maurice in the final episode and declared Oscar dead without his knowledge.) Boma becomes interim manager-chairman with Marc now playing in the team, but the team just cannot achieve any results. Due to arguing, Boma threatens to sell the field. DDT receives an unexpected visit from Pol De Tremmerie, a cousin of DDT who worked in Africa for five years as a development worker and is now coming to live with him in Belgium. Doortje, who hasn't wanted a relationship for a while since her divorce from Pico, secretly falls in love with Pol. De Kampioenen try to stop Boma from selling the field to DDT. Boma gives them, so to speak, one chance to change his mind if they win the next match. However, he reveals to DDT that he believes the team will fail and wants to laugh at them for their potential defeat, and so the field could still be his. Xavier meets Pol, who thought that De Kampioenen are bad people because of what DDT said, and the two become friends. Pol is even allowed to join the team during the important match. They win it thanks to the strong Pol. Boma changes his mind regarding the field discussion and feels that the team no longer wants him, but the team forgives him. Starting with this episode, there is a change in the team. Pol is the striker, Xavier is the coach, and Marc is the goalkeeper.
| 54 | 5.02 | "De huwelijksmakelaar" | Eric Taelman | René Swartenbroekx | 10 December 1994 |
Pascale wins a cruise for two. She goes looking for a partner. Carmen wants to set her up with Alex Cooremans, a football coach. However, Alex thinks it involves a different "Madame Crucke". Due to another misunderstanding, the other members of De Kampioenen think that Pol and Pascale are a couple. Guest actors: Hans De Munter (Alex Cooremans)
| 55 | 5.03 | "Liefde is blind" | Eric Taelman | Anton Klee | 17 December 1994 |
DDT and Boma are after the same woman: Lea De Wilde. De Kampioenen want to prove that it is only about the money. Guest actors: Veerle Eyckermans (Lea De Wilde) - Anton Cogen (Jean-Paul, from the restaurant "Chéz Jean-Paul") - Gerda Marchand (customer at restaurant "Chéz Jean-Paul") Absent: Herman Verbruggen (Marc Vertongen)
| 56 | 5.04 | "Overtijd" | Eric Taelman | René Swartenbroekx | 24 December 1994 |
When Bieke is "overdue" with an article, De Kampioenen think she is pregnant. As a result, they give Bieke extra care. This misunderstanding causes a lot of commotion and leads to more misunderstandings. For instance, Marc thinks Bieke is pregnant by another man, and Bieke thinks Marc has gotten another woman pregnant. Their relationship threatens to fall apart. When Pascale hears about the misunderstandings, she is capable of anything. Eventually, the truth comes out, and Bieke and Marc stay together. Guest actors: Remco (Billie Coppens)
| 57 | 5.05 | "Vrouwenhandel" | Eric Taelman | Jan Schuermans | 31 December 1994 |
DDT wants to get into the exotic meat business. However, De Kampioenen think he has ended up in the human trafficking business. Guest actors: Jakob Beks (Michel 'Mike' Verfaillie) - Muriel Bats (girlfriend of Mike) - Hilde Van Wesepoel (prostitute)
| 58 | 5.06 | "De filmster" | Eric Taelman | Anton Klee | 7 January 1995 |
A promotional video for the army is being filmed. Xavier makes one slip of the tongue after another, Carmen fancies herself a movie star, Pascale turns her canteen into a tavern, and DDT and Boma try to advertise their products. As a result, however, the filming goes completely wrong. Guest actors: Peter Broekaert (Captain Versluis)
| 59 | 5.07 | "Boma's list" | Dirk Corthout | Frank Van Laecke | 14 January 1995 |
Doortje wants a relationship with Pol. Boma wants a relationship with Pascale. When clear answers from their lovers fail to materialize, Boma and Doortje pretend to be a couple. Their plan has an immediate effect on Pascale, but not yet on Pol; however, their relationship irritates him so much that he leaves a match, causing De Kampioenen to lose. Things go wrong when Boma develops real feelings for Doortje. Consequently, she gets fed up with Boma and sends him away. Pol, having a good conversation with Xavier, realizes that he likes Doortje after all. Doortje and Pol become a couple. Ultimately, things go completely wrong for Boma when he calls Doortje to apologize, but Pascale happens to overhear them, finding out Boma's plans. She literally teaches him a harsh lesson.
| 60 | 5.08 | "De stagiaire" | Dirk Corthout | Jan Schuermans | 21 January 1995 |
Pascale wants to turn the canteen into a tavern. However, she cannot count on the support of her daughter and friends, so she asks Pol for an intern. Meanwhile, DDT is very busy and has the same idea. The intern turns out to be a woman who knows nothing about cooking but is a whiz at car mechanics and plumbing. De Kampioenen make sure that DDT does not find out that she is his intern. Guest actors: Nathalie Steelandt (Silvie intern)
| 61 | 5.09 | "Marc macho" | Dirk Corthout | Wout Thielemans | 28 January 1995 |
Marc struggles to stand up for himself. If the situation doesn't improve, Bieke doesn't want to see him anymore. He attends a self-confidence workshop. Marc returns as a real macho, but not everyone is equally happy with this transformation. Guest actors: Pol Goossen (Diederik Legrand)
| 62 | 5.10 | "De steward" | Dirk Corthout | Jan Schuermans | 4 February 1995 |
DDT reads in the newspaper that a football club has to close its doors due to supporter violence. He recruits two tough guys, Fred and Frank, to cause a ruckus. Confronted with the threat of DDT's henchmen, De Kampioenen hire a steward. The steward, Leslie De Decker, turns out to be an old flame of Carmen's. When Carmen falls in love with Leslie again and makes plans to leave Xavier, Xavier wants to get rid of the steward as soon as possible. De Kampioenen try to help Xavier. Everyone gives him good advice in their own way. Bieke comes up with the idea to make Carmen believe that Xavier can handle the hooligans and is a hero. They pay him to play along. The plan seems to be working until Carmen wants to be with Xavier immediately and catches him paying the hooligans for the fake action. Carmen wants to leave with Leslie, but the hooligans, feeling guilty about the commotion, reveal that they were paid by Leslie so that he could act like a steward. Leslie confesses that he did this to win Carmen back after having thought about her for a long time. Leslie is sent away by Carmen and she realizes that those strong men like in the movies she watched don't exist. Eventually, Xavier and Carmen give each other another chance and they stay together. They celebrate this with the team and the hooligans as well. DDT gets away with sending the hooligans and thus setting the events of the episode in motion. Guest actors: Ben Van Ostade (steward Leslie De Decker) - Ludo Busschots (hooligan Frank) - Kurt Defrancq (hooligan Fred)
| 63 | 5.11 | "De clubkas" | Dirk Corthout | René Swartenbroekx | 11 February 1995 |
De Kampioenen organized a raffle that went exceptionally well: 25,000 francs in proceeds. Meanwhile, Pol is in financial trouble. He does have a job in education, but has to wait months before he receives his first paycheck. It is particularly annoying that Valentine is on the way and Doortje has already given him a nice gift. Pol tries to borrow money from his uncle DDT, but he charges exorbitant interest. Marc was instructed to take the club treasury to Boma. According to Carmen, the treasury was empty upon arrival. She wants to find out where the 25,000 francs went. Guest actors: Remco (Billie Coppens)
| 64 | 5.12 | "Aardstralen" | Dirk Corthout | Anton Klee | 18 February 1995 |
Carmen detects earth rays with a dowsing rod. She thinks that the poor results of De Kampioenen and Pascale's sleep problems are due to this. DDT ensures that everyone actually believes that the field is negatively charged. Guest actors: Jan Hongenaert (customer at DDT)
| 65 | 5.13 | "DDT getrouwd" | Dirk Corthout | Anton Klee | 25 February 1995 |
Ma DDT calls her son with the news that she has found the ideal woman for him. DDT tries to save himself by saying, "I already have a wife." When his mother decides to come over to meet this woman, DDT tries to set up a fake relationship with Pascale. Pascale is not at all keen on the idea, but when DDT promises that it is only for one weekend, that nothing will happen, and that there is a car included for her, Pascale decides to play along for two days. De Kampioenen can't believe their eyes, and Bieke, who has always considered Boma a bad catch, fears that her mother is going senile. Guest actors: Jenny Tanghe (Georgette "Ma DDT" Verreth) - Karin Jacobs (Carolientje) - Remco (Billie Coppens)

=== Season 6 (1995–1996) ===
==== Main cast ====
- Danni Heylen (Pascale De Backer)
- An Swartenbroeckx (Bieke Crucke)
- Herman Verbruggen (Marc Vertongen) - 12 episodes
- Marijn Devalck (Balthasar Boma)
- Ann Tuts (Doortje Van Hoeck)
- Ben Rottiers (Pol De Tremmerie)
- Loes Van den Heuvel (Carmen Vandormael-Waterslaeghers)
- Johny Voners (Xavier Waterslaeghers)
- Jacques Vermeire (Dimitri De Tremmerie, DDT)
- Moestiek (Nero, Carmen's dog)

==== Regular guest actors ====
(Characters who appear multiple times throughout the series)

- Daan Hugaert (Seppe Van De Kruis)
- Ron Cornet (Colonel Germain Vandesijpe)
- Dirk Vermiert (Sergeant De Kroet)
- Stef Van Litsenborgh (agent Jean 'Julien' Michelin)
- Remco (Billie Coppens)

==== Crew ====
- Jan Schuermans (scenario)
- Frank Van Laecke (scenario)
- Koen Vermeiren (scenario)
- Anton Klee (scenario)
- René Swartenbroekx (scenario)
- Wout Thielemans (scenario and script editor)
- Bart Cooreman (scenario)
- Eric Taelman (director, E1–E9)
- Stef Desmyter (director, E10–E13)
- Bruno Raes (producer)

| No. overall | No. in season | Title | Directed by | Written by | Original release date |
|---|---|---|---|---|---|
| 66 | 6.01 | "Mijnheer Constant" | Eric Taelman | Jan Schuermans | 2 December 1995 |
Boma acts very important about his latest acquisition: a portable phone. There is a lot of laughter until a certain Mr. Constant from Anderlecht calls with the proposal to play a friendly match. Boma thinks it is Constant Vanden Stock, the leading man of RSC Anderlecht. Because of this news, De Kampioenen want to give the Anderlecht team a grand welcome. DDT is allowed to build a grandstand, but he cannot agree when he hears that he will have to pay for it. To his great anger, rival Van Roost puts up a grandstand right in front of his garage. He sabotages it without De Kampioenen finding out. The women feel they must organize something now that Anderlecht is coming to play. They practice a cheerleader dance. Eventually, it turns out to be a misunderstanding. They end up with a team from another sport from Anderlecht. Everyone is furious, and the situation gets worse when Boma is called again by a Constant, and Boma furiously sends the man into a frenzy. The man turns out to be the real Constant Vanden Stock. Because of this action, Anderlecht really won't be playing against De Kampioenen anymore, much to the annoyance of the well-known Anderlecht players who were previously mentioned by the men. Meanwhile, Pol has his hands full moving his belongings to Doortje's small apartment. Guest actors: Dirk Lavrysen (Freddy Constant) - Johan Vanneck (member of TC Anderlecht) - Constant Vanden Stock (himself) - Danny Boffin (himself) - John Bosman (himself) - Marc Emmers (himself) - Philip Haagdoren (himself) - Yaw Preko (himself) - Bruno Versavel (himself)
| 67 | 6.02 | "De bakvis" | Eric Taelman | Frank Van Laecke | 9 December 1995 |
At De Kampioenen, there is a debate about the annual feast: Boma wants a meal with sausage on the menu, the others a mussel supper. Pascale is feeling unwell, and when the doctor on call arrives, he turns out to be at least to her liking. Especially when it comes out that Doctor Mercier is single. Pascale bends over backwards to be able to go to the opera with her doctor. Meanwhile, DDT has heard that there is a lot of money to be made supplying mussels. He turns things around so that he will be allowed to supply them and sets out to harvest mussels. Just like Pascale's romantic adventure, DDT's mussel outing will end differently than he had imagined. Guest actors: Harry Deswarte (Doctor Jean Mercier)
| 68 | 6.03 | "Boem!" | Eric Taelman | Koen Vermeiren | 16 December 1995 |
The teasing between De Kampioenen and DDT resumes when De Kampioenen kick a misdirected ball into DDT's garage just as he was busy with some precision work. DDT wants revenge again, and during a visit from a farmer, he learns that the farmer is having trouble with moles on his property. DDT borrows the moles and releases them onto the field. De Kampioenen have a lot of trouble getting rid of the moles. To play a trick on him in return, they decide to make him believe that a Roman villa once stood on the site where DDT's garage now stands. DDT doesn't fall for it, until a bust of a distant ancestor of Boma is unearthed. DDT immediately starts digging in the garage while being laughed at for being framed. However, DDT keeps searching. The team's revenge plan escalates when DDT finds a valuable object after all and takes it to the canteen. It turns out to be an active shell from the First World War. Fortunately, Xavier and Boma are the heroes of the day. Guest actors: Walter Cornelis (farmer Batselier) - Jan Lauwers (art appraiser)
| 69* | 6.04* | "Blauwhelmen" | Eric Taelman | Anton Klee | 23 December 1995 |
Xavier and his colleague Seppe plan to have a good drinking session at the beer festival. They will dress up as UN peacekeepers to get free drinks. They will make Carmen believe that they are on a secret mission. However, Carmen discovers one of the blue helmets and deduces that Xavier is going to be deployed as a UN soldier. No one believes her until Boma calls his friend Colonel Vandesijpe and learns that something 'Top Secret' is indeed in the works that must be kept secret. De Kampioenen are going to throw a farewell party. It is DDT's birthday that day, and he thinks preparations are underway for a party for his 40th birthday. Guest actors: Ron Cornet (Colonel Germain Vandesijpe) - Dirk Vermiert (Sergeant De Kroet) - Daan Hugaert (Seppe Van De Kruis)
| 70 | 6.05 | "De sympathiekste" | Eric Taelman | René Swartenbroekx | 30 December 1995 |
On DDT's gate, the sign 'DDT OK CARS' has been changed to 'DDT WC CARS'. Dimitri is quite angry about this and thinks that De Kampioenen have something to do with it. In the midst of his rage, DDT receives a visit from a representative of the trade association. They are running a campaign to boost the image of garage owners. When DDT hears that the most likeable mechanic will receive 100,000 francs, he bends over backwards to appear likeable to De Kampioenen. This suits them well, as all kinds of repairs needed to be done. Pol and Doortje dream of a 'loft' above DDT's garage. They want to take advantage of the situation to secure the most favorable rental contract possible. De Kampioenen learn about the competition for the best mechanic and see their chance to take advantage of DDT. DDT struggles due to excessive debt, and when Marc and Bieke make matters worse, DDT loses control—at the very moment the representative of the trade union witnesses his rage in the canteen. Ultimately, DDT's rival Van Roost wins the competition, and Pol and Doortje live in the loft above the garage. Guest actors: Ronnie Commissaris (Mr. Kolenblunder) - Remco (Billie Coppens)
| 71 | 6.06 | "Carmen vermist" | Eric Taelman | Frank Van Laecke | 6 January 1996 |
Carmen is fed up with everything and feels that her life has lost its meaning. When she learns that the owner of a local newsagent has passed away, she wants to take over the shop, but Xavier is completely against the idea. To make Xavier feel lonely and get her way, she temporarily leaves him and goes to live with Pol and Doortje. She disguises herself as a certain Daisy/Miranda. Xavier and DDT fall in love with "Daisy/Miranda". Xavier does many things with Daisy/Miranda that hurt Carmen. Subsequently, she reveals her true identity in DDT's garage, but Xavier reveals that he had already recognized her and was just joking. Xavier and Carmen stay together and manage to free DDT from Carmen's identity as Daisy/Miranda. However, things do not go entirely well for Xavier, as Carmen managed to convince Boma during the episode to let her run the newsagent and thus gets her way once again.
| 72* | 6.07* | "Bij Xavier" | Eric Taelman | René Swartenbroekx | 13 January 1996 |
After the events of the previous episode, Carmen gets her way and opens the newspaper shop: Bij Xavier. However, Carmen is completely stressed out: there is still so much to be sorted out. Xavier anticipates that he will have to get up early every day to receive the newspapers. He also fears having to work in the shop on his days off. Bieke wants to help him by sending an actor friend to act as a so-called labor inspector to make it clear to Carmen that Xavier is not allowed to work in her shop. Pascale sees the world through rose-tinted glasses, because she met a new boyfriend during an outing who is a good dancer. Bieke does not know that her mother's new boyfriend is a labor inspector in real life. That, coincidentally, everyone at Carmen's shop works under the table. Guest actors: Eddie Brugman (Christophe Uyttevenne) - Koen De Graeve (Johan) - Bob Van Der Veken (Paul Thienpondt) - Jacky Morel (Hilaire Baconfoy) - Manu Verreth (Jomme Dockx)
| 73* | 6.08* | "Prijs" | Eric Taelman | Wout Thielemans | 20 January 1996 |
When Xavier goes to pick up his car from DDT after a repair, it turns out he doesn't have enough money to pay for the repair. He manages to take his car by giving a lottery ticket he has in his pocket as collateral. While Carmen is poring over the horoscopes in her newspaper, she suddenly discovers that her ticket has won. The challenge now will be to get the ticket back from DDT without him realizing that there is something special about it. Meanwhile, Boma wants to make a good impression on Bieke to overcome her resistance to his relationship with Pascale. Bieke sees through his game and enjoys the situation. Absent: Herman Verbruggen (Marc Vertongen)
| 74 | 6.09 | "Houd de dief" | Eric Taelman | Anton Klee | 27 January 1996 |
De Kampioenen find it annoying that Xavier has to work so much at Carmen's newspaper shop. He no longer has time for his players, and the training sessions are suffering. Meanwhile, the area is being terrorized by a thief. This gives the men the idea to tie Xavier to a chair in the shop and stage a mock robbery. Xavier then has to pretend that he is so scared that he can no longer stand in the shop. The women feel a lot of pity for Xavier's trauma. According to them, there is only one solution: organize a mock burglary so that Xavier can save Carmen; that way, he will regain his self-confidence. The men are completely reluctant to set up a (second) mock burglary. DDT witnesses the first fake robbery but receives hush money. Nevertheless, he reveals the men's plans to the women for money. The women want to teach the men a lesson. They lock Boma, Pol, and Marc in the dressing room and go to the newspaper shop with an acquaintance of Bieke's, disguised as a thief, to get revenge on Xavier. The acquaintance, however, drops out, and so DDT becomes the thief. The men free themselves and give chase. The commotion escalates when a real thief, possibly the one mentioned earlier, targets the newspaper shop. In the end, everything turns out well, or sort of. Because a police officer, who had previously gotten into trouble on the road with DDT and the women and was chasing them as well, mistakes DDT for the thief and arrests him. The women try to help him while the real thief is overpowered by Marc and taken away by the men. Xavier and Carmen stay behind at their house, and although Carmen knows the cause of the commotion, she is so traumatized by the thief that she refuses to work at the newspaper shop and insists that Xavier do it. As a result, nothing changes regarding the situation at the shop. Guest actors: Paul Wuyts (police officer) - Rik Schrauwen (thief)
| 75 | 6.10 | "Cupido" | Stef Desmyter | Koen Vermeiren | 3 February 1996 |
Pascale has gone to a marriage agency to find a suitable partner. He will come to the De Kampioenen canteen with a red rose in his buttonhole as a distinguishing mark. That same day, Carmen presents a similar flower to the hundredth customer in her little shop, namely Pol. Pascale is therefore shocked when she sees Pol, who is arguing with Doortje because she already wants to marry him, enter the canteen with a red rose. Nosy Carmen and 'helpful' Marc and Xavier will ensure that the misunderstandings continue to pile up. Pascale thinks it is about her. Eventually, the misunderstandings are cleared up, and there is a surprise when it turns out that Boma also went to a marriage agency to find a suitable partner. Guest actors: Karina Geenen (Brigitte) - Anouk Ganzevoort (customer in the canteen)
| 76 | 6.11 | "Gigolo Marc" | Stef Desmyter | Bart Cooreman | 10 February 1996 |
Marc participates in a protest at the university: he spends the night there with a few fellow students at a sleep-in demonstration. The next morning, Carmen meets Maaike in the cafeteria, a girl Marc was with during the night. She returns Marc's sports bag. Carmen rummages through the bag and finds a bra among Marc's sleeping gear. For Carmen, it is clear: Marc is cheating on Bieke, and that cannot be right. Bieke's birthday is coming up soon. She fears that Marc, now that he is so busy with the protest, will forget her birthday. Eventually, the misunderstanding is cleared up, because the bra actually belongs to Pascale, who ended up in the sports bag for some unknown reason. Guest actors: Stef Van Litsenborgh (agent Jean 'Julien' Michelin) - Anne Somers (Maaike) - Ingrid Van Rensbergen (Eva)
| 77 | 6.12 | "American football" | Stef Desmyter | Jan Schuermans | 17 February 1996 |
Boma launches the 'Bomaburger' and wants to do American-style promotion. Bieke suggests organizing an 'American football' game, in which De Kampioenen will play against the team of Little Marc, a friend from America. A fancy dress contest is also organized. When Little Marc comes to stay with the Cruckes, the Belgian Marc gets jealous because it turns out Bieke and Little Marc hit it off well. Guest actors: Willem Carpentier (Little Marc)
| 78 | 6.13 | "Boma's sister" | Stef Desmyter | Wout Thielemans | 24 February 1996 |
Boma receives a phone call from his sister Barbara in Australia. She is on a business trip in Europe and will use a layover in Zaventem to drop by. He panics slightly because he led her to believe that he has a wife and child. Marc is willing to pretend to be Boma's son for one day in exchange for a new transmitter for Radio Hallo. Who will play Boma's wife is less well arranged, as both Carmen and Pascale feel called to the role. Barbara sees the spitting image of her deceased husband in DDT and falls hopelessly in love with him. DDT is afraid of this pushy woman and does not want to respond to her advances, but will find out too late that she – and not Balthasar – is the real owner of the field. Guest actors: Joanna Geldof (Barbara Boma)

=== Season 7 (1996–1997) ===
==== Main cast ====
- Danni Heylen (Pascale De Backer)
- An Swartenbroeckx (Bieke Crucke)
- Herman Verbruggen (Marc Vertongen) - 11 episodes
- Marijn Devalck (Balthasar Boma)
- Ann Tuts (Doortje Van Hoeck)
- Ben Rottiers (Pol De Tremmerie)
- Loes Van den Heuvel (Carmen Vandormael-Waterslaeghers)
- Johny Voners (Xavier Waterslaeghers)
- Jacques Vermeire (Dimitri De Tremmerie, DDT)
- Moestiek (Nero, Carmen's dog)

==== Regular guest actors ====
(Characters who appear multiple times throughout the series)

- Jenny Tanghe (Georgette "Ma DDT" Verreth)
- Denise Daems (Madeleine De Backer)
- Isabel Leybaert (Pia Maria)
- Stef Van Litsenborgh (agent Jean 'Julien' Michelin)
- Jos Kennis (police officer, colleague of Julien)
- Alex Cassiers (Theo Vertongen)
- Lea Couzin (Marie-Paule Vertongen)
- Myriam Mulder (Minou)
- Agnes De Nul (Liliane Verhoeven, Councilor for Culture and Entertainment)
- Ron Cornet (Colonel Germain Vandesijpe)
- Achiel Van Malderen (animal doctor André Van Tichelen)
- Remco (Billie Coppens)

==== Crew ====
- Koen Vermeiren (scenario)
- René Swartenbroekx (scenario)
- Anton Klee (scenario)
- Jan Schuermans (scenario)
- Bart Cooreman (scenario)
- Wout Thielemans (scenario and script editor)
- Stef Desmyter (director)
- Bruno Raes (producer)

| No. overall | No. in season | Title | Directed by | Written by | Original release date |
|---|---|---|---|---|---|
| 79* | 7.01* | "Sinterklaas kampioentje" | Stef Desmyter | Koen Vermeiren | 7 December 1996 |
De Kampioenen organize a Sinterklaas party to attract more supporters, but also to promote Boma's newest sausage, the "Boma Light". Xavier is appointed as Zwarte Piet and Pol's colleague André Buys becomes Sinterklaas. However, DDT cancels André and takes on the role himself to annoy De Kampioenen. But then the real Sinterklaas shows up. Guest actors: Bob Davidse (Sinterklaas) - Frank Dingenen (André Buys) - Remco (Billie Coppens)
| 80 | 7.02 | "Het schilderij" | Stef Desmyter | René Swartenbroekx | 14 December 1996 |
Carmen is fed up with the clutter in the attic and wants Xavier to ask DDT to take the junk away. He agrees because he thinks there might be something valuable among it. One of the objects is an old painting by Xavier's father: Forest Dahlias with Drooping Flowers. DDT gives it to Doortje as a gift for her birthday. At the party, Boma reveals that De Kampioenen will continue to exist, no matter what happens. Doortje wants to get rid of the painting and gives it to Bieke, but Pascale is against it. Meanwhile, Boma discovers that the painting might be valuable. Carmen overhears the conversation between Boma and the art expert and wants the painting back. She gets it back from Pascale, but when Xavier, who has not been informed, sees the painting again, he asks Pol to take it. Pol sends it to the trash. DDT's mother comes to visit. She suffers from osteoarthritis and therefore needs a physiotherapist. DDT does everything he can to avoid paying the physiotherapist, from having Marc act as doctor to a special tricycle. Ma DDT discovers the painting and wants to keep it. Everyone finds out about the potential value of the painting, and an argument ensues. Next, they have the art expert appraise the painting, with DDT having the idea to use the money for his mother, so that neither he nor De Kampioenen end up with any of it. Ultimately, the painting does not seem valuable because it is a copy, but DDT destroys the painting in a fit of rage, discovering from the damage that it is from the Renaissance. But now that it is destroyed, it certainly can no longer be used. Guest actors: Jenny Tanghe (Georgette "Ma DDT" Verreth) - Leo Madder (art expert Enkels) - Remco (Billie Coppens)
| 81 | 7.03 | "Doping" | Stef Desmyter | Anton Klee | 21 December 1996 |
DDT finds a banned product for athletes in a customer's car, which is currently being repaired and normally goes to Van Roost. The team prepares for the match but gets into an argument with Pascale. When they go to the locker room, they find chocolates, according to a letter from Pascale who wants to make amends. Boma launches the Boma Sport Sausage and forces the team to eat it. Xavier makes the players drink herbal gin to remove the taste. De Kampioenen win a match for once but receive a visit from the doping inspector and are subsequently found positive in a doping control. They are suspended. Boma, who is busy with the Boma Sport, thinks it is bad for him and threatens to sell the football field this time. Pol, Xavier, and Carmen investigate, and after an argument with Bieke—because she doesn't want Pascale to use her charms to change Boma's mind—they reflect on what they have eaten or drunk lately. First, Xavier and his herbal gin are suspected, but it turns out Marc secretly didn't use it, even though he also tested positive for doping. Then Boma and Boma Sport are suspected, but Boma clearly denies it and reveals that they have little time before he sells the field to DDT. Next, Pascale and her pralines are suspected. Ultimately, DDT turns out to be the culprit when Pol recognizes his handwriting on the letter. The doping inspector and the customer are present when Carmen, Pol, and Xavier confront DDT. DDT receives a fine and loses the customer, who returns to Van Roost. He wants De Kampioenen to forgive him, which they do, but they cannot resist making various demands on DDT so that they reach an agreement. Guest actors: Hubert Damen (Mr. Verachtert) - Marijke Hofkens (Veronique) - Marc Bober (doping inspector)
| 82 | 7.04 | "Marc stopt" | Stef Desmyter | Jan Schuermans | 28 December 1996 |
Carmen discovers that Marc is skipping classes and eating dame blanche in an ice cream parlor during class hours. As expected, she informs Bieke, but Bieke is not happy that she is interfering. Marc admits that his exams are going badly and that he wants to quit his medical studies. Pascale doesn't want to hear about it, especially now that her sister Madeleine has announced she is coming to visit. With the help of Carmen and Doortje, she wants to change Marc's mind. Meanwhile, Marc himself has already started looking for a job. He applies to DDT and Boma, among others, without success. Carmen tries to make Marc change his mind, but sustains a back injury in the process. Bieke discovers Pascale's plans and opposes them. Marc must choose: return to his medical studies as Pascale wants, or find a job where he feels comfortable, as Bieke wants. Ultimately, Madeleine's visit, which Pascale lies to her about Marc, ends completely badly when it is revealed that Marc has landed a job at Madeleine's praline factory. Meanwhile, as an additional part of the storyline, De Kampioenen are bothered by a loose tile on the floor near the entrance to the café area that is not being repaired. The tile and an unexpected rescue by Madeleine ensure that Carmen is relieved of her back injury. Guest actors: Denise Daems (Madeleine De Backer) - Rit Van Boeckel (Jeanneke from the ice cream parlor)
| 83 | 7.05 | "Verboden vruchten" | Stef Desmyter | Bart Cooreman | 4 January 1997 |
Doortje has won a trip to an exotic destination, but cannot go with Pol because Pol has to attend ski classes during that period. The only person who can replace him has already planned a trip for that time. De Kampioeen are all interested in taking over the trip. Thanks to an idea from Bieke, they decide to turn it into a competition. Whoever manages to abstain from their addiction for three days wins the trip. Pascale is not allowed to eat sweets, Carmen cannot drink port or smoke cigars, Xavier cannot drink beer, and Boma must stay away from women for three days. To keep an eye on each other, Carmen will temporarily move in with Pascale. Boma has to live with Xavier for three days. Meanwhile, Marc will answer the phones at Boma's desk. DDT wants to thwart the resolutions in the hope of winning the trip himself so he can sell it. DDT has Pascale, Xavier, and Carmen use his garage separately to indulge in their addictions and secretly takes photos. Pia Maria, who normally goes with Boma to Marc's place around Radio Hallo, wants to see Boma, but Marc tries to prevent it. An argument ensues, and due to a misunderstanding, Bieke thinks Marc is cheating on her with Pia. The argument ends when Pia discovers that her troublemaker is the man from Radio Hallo and they are working together. Then, on the deadline, DDT reveals the photos, resulting in Pascale, Xavier, and Carmen being disqualified. Boma seems to be winning, but Pia goes to see him anyway, which causes his reaction that she want no further contact with him. Bieke discovers the misunderstanding and forgives Marc. Ultimately, DDT seems to be the winner, but then Pol discovers that his colleague isn't going on his own vacation after all because something happened to his wife. He is able to replace him for the school ski trip, allowing Pol and Doortje to go on vacation after all. Because of this, the competition was all for nothing. Guest actors: Isabel Leybaert (Pia Maria)
| 84 | 7.06 | "De erfenis" | Stef Desmyter | Anton Klee | 11 January 1997 |
Pol receives news that he will inherit from an African tribal chief whom he once saved from a crocodile. The inheritance turns out to be potentially a large sum of money. Pol and Doortje decide to save the money, but the other members of De Kampioenen have other plans. Pascale dreams of a fashion boutique, Carmen of a dog grooming salon, and Bieke of a jeep. Xavier, who initially had no plan and had to help Carmen, is offered the idea of starting his own brewery. Boma is working on a mysterious project and wants to use the money for that as well. The project turns out to be an amusement park centered around him. Doortje, however, has plans for the money to turn DDT's garage into a playground for Billie. DDT agrees because he receives a share of the money in exchange to take over Roost's garage or another garage, thereby ridding himself of his rival and De Kampioenen. Pol wants to use the money for a motorcycle ride. A brief argument ensues between Pol and Doortje before they realize they had better wait with their ideas. De Kampioenen agree to combine their dreams at Boma's amusement park, with Marc getting to work there. Ultimately, the inheritance turns out to be a monkey that is given to DDT. Although De Kampioenen laugh at him, it does mean that no one's dream comes true.
| 85 | 7.07 | "DDT bedreigd" | Stef Desmyter | Bart Cooreman | 18 January 1997 |
In the region of F.C. De Kampioenen, a neighborhood dispute has ended in murder. DDT hears the news and tries to be friendly with De Kampioenen, with the men then seemingly getting their chance to take advantage of him (again). Also shaken by the news, Doortje decides that the teasing between DDT and the Kampioenen team must finally come to an end. She manages to convince the other women to celebrate a party for Saint Dimitri soon. Meanwhile, De Kampioenen are plagued by another problem: there is a rat in the area. The men decide to exterminate the animal. Due to misunderstandings surrounding 'the enemy', the men's attempts to kill the rat, and the women's holy plans, DDT thinks that De Kampioenen want to murder him. As a result, the party for Saint Dimitri ends terribly, and DDT is injured when the men disable the rat with an explosive. DDT sends police officers to arrest De Kampioenen, but then the misunderstanding comes to light. Ultimately, DDT and De Kampioenen remain enemies. Guest actors: Stef Van Litsenborgh (agent Jean 'Julien' Michelin) - Jos Kennis (police officer, colleague of Julien)
| 86 | 7.08 | "Schijn bedriegt" | Stef Desmyter | Koen Vermeiren | 25 January 1997 |
Marc's parents announce that they will be coming to visit. Marc immediately panics: he hasn't yet told his parents that he has dropped out of medical school. He now fears having to work in his parents' business, which is a funeral home. Boma leaves for a few days to attend a congress of meat exporters in London. Unbeknownst to Boma, De Kampioenen will trick Marc's parents into believing that their son is a deputy director at Boma Meat Industry. Xavier and Carmen pose as Marc's personal advisors, and Pol will drop by to order a large quantity of sausages. When DDT tries to spill the beans about the whole affair, De Kampioenen quickly say that he is the village idiot. De Kampioenen make DDT believe that he is really going crazy, which seems to lead to problems. The situation goes wrong when Marc’s parents want to live in Boma’s villa and when Boma returns early from the congress. Eventually, everything comes out and Marc receives good news: His parents already have a worker. Just like in De Kampioenen, they also work under the table. DDT is also informed, but the consequences are even greater when DDT throws away the chance to have his garage renovated for free by a businessman because he thinks it is a joke. Guest actors: Alex Cassiers (Theo Vertongen) - Lea Couzin (Marie-Paule Vertongen) - Myriam Mulder (Minou) - Agnes De Nul (councilor Liliane Verhoeven) - Ron Cornet (Colonel Germain Vandesijpe) - Gerd De Ley (Achiel Vanhaperen)
| 87* | 7.09* | "Zwarte liefde" | Stef Desmyter | Jan Schuermans | 1 February 1997 |
Doortje finds it annoying that Pol wants to get married but refuses to set a precise date. Carmen has found a questionnaire in one of her notebooks designed to determine how faithful a partner is. When she hears from Doortje that Pol scores very few points on it, Carmen finds this suspicious. Moreover, when it comes to light that Pol is receiving perfumed letters from Africa, Carmen believes there is clearly something wrong with Pol. According to her, Pol has a lover, and perhaps even a wife, in Africa. Doortje is completely bewildered by it all. Eventually, the letters turn out to be from an actual African woman, namely Pol's Plan International child (who later turns out to be Marie-Josée Sanou in season 19 of the series). Doortje and Pol stay together, but throughout the series, Carmen will continue to spread several misunderstandings that Pol is cheating on Doortje, sometimes even intentionally. Meanwhile, DDT has found a way to tap electricity from De Kampioenen via a self-designed energy-saving switch. Absent: Herman Verbruggen (Marc Vertongen)
| 88 | 7.10 | "Smeergeld" | Stef Desmyter | Jan Schuermans | 8 February 1997 |
At Carmen's insistence, Xavier has changed positions in the army. He now works in the purchasing department. Boma has more than just an ordinary interest in this. When, after a visit to Boma, Xavier suddenly turns out to have money to pay off his pub debts, Bieke thinks that Boma slipped Xavier money so he could supply sausages to the army. That would actually work out well for Boma, now that the prison no longer buys sausages from him. Bieke therefore sees the opportunity to bring Boma down, but ultimately the misunderstanding is discovered and she has to apologize to him. DDT wants to jump on board and supply car tires to the army. Christina, who works in the army's purchasing department, thinks that Boma and DDT have other interests. Marc sells "The Snurff" vacuum cleaners door to door, but his demonstrations are so unsuccessful that it does not look like he will be able to keep the job for long. Guest actors: Fania Sorel (Christina)
| 89 | 7.11 | "De optimist" | Stef Desmyter | Koen Vermeiren | 15 February 1997 |
Carmen hears from Doctor Van Tichelen that Balthazar has only one week left to live. Among De Kampioenen, the news hits terribly. The story is apparently confirmed when Boma has to go to the notary to settle an inheritance. Now that Boma is about to die, everyone wants his final days to be as pleasant as possible. Suddenly, people are eating Boma sausage, a match is organized that De Kampioenen are sure to win, and Pascale wants to make up for lost years. Meanwhile, DDT is already eyeing Boma's will. The match goes wrong after all because of the eating of the Boma sausage. Bieke even seems to support Boma despite their history. Pascale even wants to marry Boma. Boma seems surprised, but looks physically normal. What De Kampioenen don't know is that Boma went to the notary to claim an inheritance from a deceased sugar aunt in Canada. What Carmen also didn't know is that Doctor Van Tichelen is a veterinarian and the Balthazar he was referring to is Boma's mother's dog. The misunderstanding is therefore revealed, and Boma ensures that De Kampioenen can still have the party. Pascale, however, is angry, even when Boma kindly claims that they can get married someday after all, which she misinterprets. Guest actors: Achiel Van Malderen (animal doctor André Van Tichelen) Absent: Herman Verbruggen (Marc Vertongen)
| 90 | 7.12 | "De helderziende" | Stef Desmyter | Bart Cooreman | 22 February 1997 |
Carmen has been to a psychic who predicted a bright future for her. Her stories are met with disbelief. DDT hears that there is a lot of money to be made predicting the future and now wants to pose as a psychic himself. Marc has found new work as an assistant postman. DDT is now going to try to obtain letters from Marc's mailbag in order to predict the future of De Kampioenen. De Kampioenen do not understand how DDT can indeed predict a number of things. DDT gets so caught up in his role that he becomes overconfident. Now that everyone thinks he can see the future, he abuses the situation to cause a quarrel among De Kampioenen. Pol and especially Bieke are skeptical and do not believe in fortune telling. Eventually, the team discovers the truth and sends the postal inspector to him, resulting in DDT receiving a fine and ceasing his activities. Guest actors: Tuur De Weert (Post Inspector De Kegel)
| 91 | 7.13 | "Eindelijk!" | Stef Desmyter | Wout Thielemans | 1 March 1997 |
In a restaurant, Boma announces that he is soon going on vacation to the Bahamas with a good friend. Pascale is deeply offended and walks out. What Pascale doesn't know is that Boma is deliberately treating Pascale badly on the advice of Carmen, who believes this is the best method to win her over permanently. If the plan succeeds, Carmen and Xavier will get a trip to Las Vegas. Near the canteen, a certain Pierre has broken down with his car. Pascale invites him to stay over. After all, now that Bieke and Marc are on a skiing holiday, there is a room available. When Boma tries to make his move on Carmen's advice, Pascale is having breakfast with Pierre. Pascale seizes the opportunity to insult Boma in return. She pretends that Pierre is her new boyfriend. Boma is angry and walks out in a rage. DDT sees this as a chance to finally buy the field. However, matters become complicated when Bieke and Marc return early from their skiing holiday. Pascale discovers that she stands a chance for a trip with Pierre. Pierre is against the relationship and wants to leave quickly, but is stopped by DDT. More commotion ensues. Eventually, Boma and Pascale's plans come out. Pierre leaves and sends a worker from Van Roost after DDT to prove that he is lying about the status of the car. Carmen is furious because the trip to Las Vegas is not happening. Boma and Pascale have a good conversation that ends with a real kiss, much to the delight of Carmen and Xavier because the trip might be possible after all, and anger from Bieke. The episode and season conclude, meaning we find out later whether Pascale and Boma have a real relationship after that kiss. Guest actors: Eric Kerremans (Pierre Dekeyser)

=== Season 8 (1997–1998) ===
==== Main cast ====
- Danni Heylen (Pascale De Backer)
- An Swartenbroeckx (Bieke Crucke) - 10 episodes
- Herman Verbruggen (Marc Vertongen)
- Marijn Devalck (Balthasar Boma)
- Ann Tuts (Doortje Van Hoeck) - 10 episodes
- Ben Rottiers (Pol De Tremmerie)
- Loes Van den Heuvel (Carmen Vandormael-Waterslaeghers)
- Johny Voners (Xavier Waterslaeghers)
- Jacques Vermeire (Dimitri De Tremmerie, DDT)
- Moestiek (Nero, Carmen's dog)

==== Regular guest actors ====
(Characters who appear multiple times throughout the series)

- Marc Schillemans (Jos Dobbelaere)
- Jenny Tanghe (Georgette "Ma DDT" Verreth)
- Ron Cornet (Colonel Germain Vandesijpe)
- Fred Van Kuyk (Jean-Luc Grootjans)
- Myriam Mulder (Minou)
- Stef Van Litsenborgh (agent Jean 'Julien' Michelin)
- Jos Kennis (police officer, colleague of Julien)

==== Crew ====
- Koen Vermeiren (scenario)
- Bart Cooreman (scenario)
- René Swartenbroekx (scenario)
- Wout Thielemans (scenario and script editor)
- Jan Schuermans (scenario)
- Nico De Braeckeleer (scenario)
- Stef Desmyter (director)
- Bruno Raes (producer)
- Marc Scheers (producer, E8–E13)

| No. overall | No. in season | Title | Directed by | Written by | Original release date |
|---|---|---|---|---|---|
| 92 | 8.01 | "De verhuizing" | Stef Desmyter | Koen Vermeiren | 6 December 1997 |
After the end of the previous season, Pascale and Boma are officially a couple. Now Pascale wants to move in with Boma, against Bieke's wishes. Bieke tries to convince her not to do this, but Pascale won't listen. The rest of De Kampioenen are also against the move, because then Pascale won't keep the canteen open. In a last-ditch effort to stop Pascale, Bieke wants to set her up with her boss at Publi-Time: Jos Dobbelaere. He misinterprets this and thinks Bieke wants a relationship with him. Now that Pascale wants to move in with Boma, DDT wants to buy the canteen. He makes his mother believe that he wants to turn it into a home for Pol and Doortje to swindle her out of money. However, DDT notices that if Pol and Doortje move out, the loft will become vacant and she can move in there. This causes conflicts between DDT and Pol and Doortje. Subsequently, Dobbelaere discovers the truth and does not want a relationship with Pascale. Boma, who was confused, now also knows what Bieke was planning. Despite the commotion and the clear message, Pascale sticks to her decision and moves to Boma, causing Bieke to lose for once. DDT's plans also fall through. Guest actors: Jenny Tanghe (Georgette "Ma DDT" Verreth) - Marc Schillemans (Jos Dobbelaere)
| 93 | 8.02 | "Café zonder bier" | Stef Desmyter | Koen Vermeiren | 13 December 1997 |
Now that Pascale is living with Boma and Bieke is busy with her work at Publi-Time, Carmen temporarily takes over the café. However, she has severely underestimated it. To prove to Boma that she can run a café, she organizes a dinner dance. DDT wants to compete with De Kampioenen and opens his own canteen. Living together is a challenge for Boma and Pascale, especially since Boma has to write a speech for the annual meat traders' ball. Ultimately, things go wrong, leading Pascale and Boma to decide that she will move back in and work at the café. They do remain a couple, though. Guest actors: Ron Cornet (Colonel Germain Vandesijpe) - Fred Van Kuyk (Jean-Luc Grootjans)
| 94 | 8.03 | "Carman zwanger" | Stef Desmyter | Bart Cooreman | 20 December 1997 |
Carmen learns that the local doctor is looking for someone to look after his dog when he goes on a trip. Carmen is so enthusiastic about her new little darling that a misunderstanding arises that Carmen is expecting a child. Xavier wants to prepare for his new role as a father and goes to Doortje to learn how to care for a child. DDT misinterprets the situation and thinks that Xavier has started a relationship with Doortje and has probably gotten her pregnant. The pregnancy test that caused the misunderstanding regarding Carmen ends up in Pascale's bag thanks to Marc's bungling. Bieke, who is still opposed to the relationship between Pascale and Boma, discovers it and therefore thinks that Pascale is pregnant by Boma. She is absolutely against it and confronts Boma, causing him to prepare to become a father as well. Subsequently, when Bieke confronts Pascale, the misunderstanding comes to light. Misunderstandings regarding Doortje and Carmen also come to light, and Xavier is forced to live with two dogs temporarily. Guest actors: Tine Reymer (Sophie)
| 95 | 8.04 | "Verkocht!" | Stef Desmyter | René Swartenbroekx | 27 December 1997 |
Pascale knows from Boma that De Kampioenen are going to hold a special board meeting to discuss Marc. Lately, Marc has let so many balls into his goal that it is starting to become a problem even for De Kampioenen. Bieke goes to see Doortje to ask her to put in a word for Marc with Pol. They have to give him another chance. Two talent scouts from another team have heard that there is a good player at De Kampioenen. They ended up at DDT. DDT tells them that he is the ideal man to arrange a deal for a fee. DDT wants to give Pol to the team, but the trainer and chairman think that Marc is the player DDT wants to transfer to them. Marc has placed an advertisement to find work as a waiter. When the talent scouts enter the canteen, he thinks they have come to offer him a job. This causes misunderstandings, resulting in Marc having to play in a waiter's uniform for the team currently playing against De Kampioenen. Coincidentally, the ground around the goal is also muddy. Due to the situation, Xavier is playing goalkeeper again for once. Guest actors: Marc Lauwrys (Eugène Rutten, trainer 'de Struikers') - Frans Van der Aa (Gilbert Daenen, chairman 'de Struikers')
| 96* | 8.05* | "Roger" | Stef Desmyter | Wout Thielemans | 3 January 1998 |
Xavier won't get daily specials at the café anymore until he pays his debts. Boma tells him he's a lousy coach, and Carmen comes to pick him up because he has to repair the gutter. Xavier is fed up with everyone nagging him. He is glad he can join the army because at least they leave him alone there. However, Colonel Vandesijpe wants Xavier, dressed in a tropical uniform, to serve at an army rally, so things aren't going as he had hoped at work either. When DDT accosts Xavier and asks him when he is finally going to pay his bill, Xavier quickly says that he isn't Xavier, but his twin brother Roger, who has been living in Zaire for decades. To make his story sound convincing, Xavier quickly adds that he has a gold mine in Zaire and dresses up in the tropical uniform. DDT wants to trade his garage for that gold mine immediately. Eventually, Xavier quits playing Roger and rejoins De Kampioenen, and convinces DDT that Roger is leaving for Zaire, causing him to follow him. Guest actors: Ron Cornet (Colonel Germain Vandesijpe)
| 97 | 8.06 | "F.C. De Valentino's" | Stef Desmyter | Wout Thielemans | 10 January 1998 |
DDT responded to the advertisement of his dream woman, Annemie. However, to make a good impression on her, he included a photo of Pol with his reply. Pol, for his part, wants to become more active in the Green Movement and has arranged a meeting with An Mertens, a local politician, to this end. The two women end up at the wrong De Tremmerie. Boma also has a meeting with one of the women, causing misunderstandings to pile up. As a result, Doortje threatens to end her relationship with Pol. Eventually, everything comes out. Annemie does not want a relationship with DDT because he lied. Pol and Doortje stay together. Guest actors: Katrien Vandendries (Annemie) - Brigitte De Man (An Mertens)
| 98 | 8.07 | "Het koekoeksjong" | Stef Desmyter | Jan Schuermans | 17 January 1998 |
Doortje discovers that DDT once had a girlfriend. It didn't last long, however, as DDT got the impression that she was after his money... In the café, a certain Didier comes up with an idea to earn money by claiming to be DDT's natural child. DDT is initially opposed, but changes his mind because it provides him with a worker in his garage. Boma would like to have a successor to take over his sausage factory in the future. Pascale does not want Boma's child and proposes Bieke as his successor, but Bieke naturally refuses. Marc is appointed as Boma's 'son', but his clumsiness costs him his new position. Didier realizes that DDT has no money and acts more like the boss, which leads Didier to claim he is Boma's son when he discovers that Boma is rich. Boma is happy with his son, but he also has plans for Didier. He wants to make Didier a member of the team. The rest, who find it suspicious that Didier has gone from being DDT's son to being Boma's son, are opposed and bully him during the match. Because of this, Boma threatens to replace the team. When DDT wants to bring Didier back and consequently argues with Boma, Didier confesses the truth. He realizes he has learned his lesson and flees. DDT is angry about losing his workforce, and Boma has to do things to ensure that De Kampioenen forgive him for his behavior. Pascale and Boma stay together, much to Bieke's annoyance. However, a kiss is interrupted by Marc, who thinks he is Boma's son again. The episode ends, and the reaction is not shown. Guest actors: Myriam Mulder (Minou) - Govert Deploige (Didier)
| 99 | 8.08 | "De infiltrant" | Stef Desmyter | Koen Vermeiren | 24 January 1998 |
Boma comes to stay with Pascale because his villa is being repainted. Especially when he wants to install his office there as well, this causes considerable tension with Bieke and De Kampioenen. DDT's business is doing poorly again. Doortje finds an advertisement from a taxi company looking for a new garage to service its cars. DDT is too stingy to go to a restaurant with the manager. When he hears that Boma's villa is temporarily vacant, he gets the idea to host the manager there. The team sees their chance to take Boma back there so that he doesn't interfere with them. The commotion and the repainting result in a box of paint falling, damaging the businessman's suit, Boma's floor, and DDT's contract. Guest actors: Ludo Hellinx (businessman from Thillo) - Wouter Hendrickx (painter) - Geert Van Rampelberg (painter)
| 100 | 8.09 | "F.C. Junior" | Stef Desmyter | Nico De Braeckeleer | 31 January 1998 |
Kevin, a second cousin of Pascale, is staying with her for a day because her cousin is on holiday in London. The twelve-year-old boy is a good footballer, and Boma plans to set up a youth team: F.C. De Kapoenen. However, he wants the youth team to remain a surprise for De Kampioenen until he receives permission from the football association. Carmen overhears a meeting between Boma and a secretary of the football association. She thinks that Boma wants to get rid of the current players of De Kampioenen and start with a revamped team. And that Pol will become the new coach. DDT thinks one team is more than enough and doesn't really care for the youth team. He causes more misunderstandings. Pol could become deputy headmaster at his school, but his friends think that Pol is celebrating the coaching job, which exacerbates the situation. Boma is on Pol's side until DDT deliberately mentions that Pol is going to replace him at De Kampioenen, causing Boma to become hostile as well. Pol does not become deputy headmaster at his school after all, and De Kampioenen find out about all the misunderstandings and DDT's role. The regular team and the youth team teach DDT a lesson. In the end, there is no youth team, and therefore no second team, at De Kampioenen. Guest actors: Bert Van Tichelen (Lucien from the football association) - Griet Stevens (Carina) - Dieter Kerremans (Kevin)
| 101 | 8.10 | "De horoscoop" | Stef Desmyter | René Swartenbroekx | 7 February 1998 |
DDT wants to sell his garage to Mr. Boelen, who wants to turn it into a pig farm. Bieke has to compile the horoscopes for Publi-Time for a week. She comes up with the idea of predicting that something terrible will happen to DDT if he sells his garage. To make DDT believe that the horoscope predictions are coming true, De Kampioenen must now all pretend that their horoscopes are coming true. Bieke hadn't thought of that when she just wrote something down as a joke while compiling the horoscopes. This does cause arguments within the couples. In the end, DDT does not sell his garage. Guest actors: Jenny Tanghe (Georgette "Ma DDT" Verreth) - Roger Van Kerpel (Mr. Boelen)
| 102 | 8.11 | "Het clubblad" | Stef Desmyter | Koen Vermeiren | 14 February 1998 |
Boma gets the idea to start a club magazine. Not just any club magazine, but a luxurious publication. Everyone is allowed to contribute in their own way. Carmen and Marc become the magazine's journalists. A certain Chris De Man has applied for a coaching internship. Chris De Man turns out not to be a man, but a woman. Moreover, she is an ex-girlfriend of Pol's. Doortje has gone to visit her sick mother for a while, and Pol suggests that Chris stay with him for a few days. Gossip journalist Carmen therefore thinks (again) that Pol is cheating on Doortje. Ma DDT takes over the duties of secretary during Doortje's absence. DDT does everything he can to ensure she doesn't find out about his under-the-table dealings.Boma gets the idea to start a club magazine. Not just any club magazine, but a luxurious publication. Everyone is allowed to contribute in their own way. Carmen and Marc become the magazine's journalists. A certain Chris De Man has applied for a coaching internship. Chris De Man turns out not to be a man, but a woman. Moreover, she is an ex-girlfriend of Pol's. Doortje has gone to visit her sick mother for a while, and Pol suggests that Chris stay with him for a few days. Gossip journalist Carmen therefore thinks (again) that Pol is cheating on Doortje. Ma DDT takes over the duties of secretary during Doortje's absence. DDT does everything he can to ensure she doesn't find out about his under-the-table dealings. Guest actors: Jenny Tanghe (Georgette "Ma DDT" Verreth) - Karin Jacobs (Chris De Man) - Britt Van Der Borght (Patty, nude model) Absent: An Swartenbroekx (Bieke Crucke) - Ann Tuts (Doortje Van Hoeck)
| 103 | 8.12 | "De aanhouder wint" | Stef Desmyter | Jan Schuermans | 21 February 1998 |
Colonel Vandesijpe asks Boma to act as an intermediary for all the letters he receives from Nicole, with whom he is in love. Nicole turns out to be a niece of Pascale. She asks Pascale exactly the same thing. Due to a few misunderstandings, Boma and Pascale suspect each other of infidelity. DDT convinces his mother that Pol urgently needs care. To help him out of his predicament, Marc and Xavier send letters in the name of a secret admirer, causing Ma DDT to become involved in a love triangle. DDT wants to escalate the feud between Boma and Pascale so that he can get his hands on the football field. Eventually, everything comes out. As a result, Pascale and Boma reconcile, DDT does not get the field, and Ma DDT leaves. Guest actors: Jenny Tanghe (Georgette "Ma DDT" Verreth) - Ron Cornet (Colonel Germain Vandesijpe) - Rosemarie Bergmans (Nicole) Absent: An Swartenbroekx (Bieke Crucke) - Ann Tuts (Doortje Van Hoeck)
| 104 | 8.13 | "Spoorloos" | Stef Desmyter | Bart Cooreman | 28 February 1998 |
Xavier has a week off. Carmen wants to saddle him with the spring cleaning while she goes to have a good time. Xavier isn't keen on the idea and goes to hide out at Boma's. This suits Boma well, as he is leaving for a conference for a few days. Now he has someone to look after his villa. Vanessa also comes to seek shelter with Boma: she is on the run from her hot-tempered boyfriend. Vanessa takes over Boma's villa and lets Xavier pamper her. Carmen is at her wit's end: her Xavier has vanished without a trace. She has wanted posters printed. Once Carmen accidentally meets Vanessa at Boma's and Xavier impersonates Boma, misunderstandings start piling up. Pascale thinks Boma is cheating on her again. DDT wants to win a tanning bed at Radio Hallo and cheats. The tanning bed consequently marks the end of his freedom. DDT is arrested for tax fraud. It is not clear to De Kampioenen that DDT is leaving for good. Jacques Vermeire's final episode as the popular character Dimitri De Tremmerie (DDT). He is leaving the series to work for VTM (where he also played the role of a garage owner in the comedy series Verschoten & Zoon). Vermeire's final episode features remarkably little interaction between himself and his fellow actors. Vermeire shares the stage only with Ben Rottiers (Pol) and Loes Van den Heuvel (Carmen), and guest actors Wim Van de Velde (Mario) and An Miller (Customer). The other actors, with the exception of Marijn Devalck (Boma), An Swartenbroekx, and Ann Tuts, do not appear with Vermeire until the very last scene. Vermeire's move to VTM was a sensitive issue for fellow actors and the crew. Vermeire returns later as DDT for a guest role. Swartenbroekx and Tuts are absent from the final three episodes. The actresses went on maternity leave at the time; both were expecting their first child. Guest actors: Stef Van Litsenborgh (agent Jean 'Julien' Michelin) - Jos Kennis (police officer, colleague of Julien) - An Miller (customer at DDT) - Wim Van de Velde (Mario) - Elke Roels (Vanessa) Absent: An Swartenbroekx (Bieke Crucke) - Ann Tuts (Doortje Van Hoeck)

=== Season 9 (1998–1999) ===
==== Main cast ====
- Danni Heylen (Pascale De Backer)
- An Swartenbroeckx (Bieke Crucke)
- Herman Verbruggen (Marc Vertongen)
- Marijn Devalck (Balthasar Boma)
- Ann Tuts (Doortje Van Hoeck)
- Ben Rottiers (Pol De Tremmerie)
- Loes Van den Heuvel (Carmen Vandormael-Waterslaeghers)
- Johny Voners (Xavier Waterslaeghers)
- Jakob Beks (Bernard Theofiel Waterslaeghers, BTW) (Note: BTW was introduced in the episode "BTW inbegrepen", and by the end of that episode, it became clear that he was the new hostile neighbor and the new antagonist. As a result, the new opening credits were not used until episode "Smakelijk!". The previous opening credits featuring DDT were still used in episode "BTW inbegrepen", mentioning Jacques Vermeire even though he did not appear in the episode.)
- Moestiek (Nero, Carmen's dog)

==== Regular guest actors ====
(Characters who appear multiple times throughout the series)

- Jenny Tanghe (Georgette "Ma DDT" Verreth)
- Sjarel Branckaerts (André Van Roost) (Note: André Van Roost appeared on screen once in the episode "BTW inbegrepen", but was mentioned multiple times in earlier seasons and sometimes also played a part in the storyline of some episodes off-screen through his role as a regular competitor of DDT.)
- Ron Cornet (Colonel Germain Vandesijpe)
- Myriam Mulder (Minou)
- Stef Van Litsenborgh (agent Jean 'Julien' Michelin)
- Camilia Blereau (Bertha Boma)
- Johan De Paepe (referee)
- Vera Puts (Truus Pinckers)
- Agnes De Nul (Liliane Verhoeven, Councilor for Culture and Entertainment)

==== Crew ====
- René Swartenbroekx (scenario)
- Koen Vermeiren (scenario)
- Wout Thielemans (scenario and script editor)
- Bart Cooreman (scenario)
- Jan Bergmans (scenario)
- Gerrie Van Rompaey (scenario)
- Anton Klee (scenario)
- Stef Desmyter (director)
- Marc Scheers (producer)
- Bruno Raes (production manager)

| No. overall | No. in season | Title | Directed by | Written by | Original release date |
|---|---|---|---|---|---|
| 105 | 9.01 | "BTW inbegrepen" | Stef Desmyter | René Swartenbroekx | 28 November 1998 |
DDT ends up in prison for serious fraud, resulting in his garage becoming vacant. Now Ma DDT is trying to sell the garage. The members of De Kampioenen have no interest in the garage, but secretly, Boma and Bieke both set their sights on the building and each try separately to persuade Ma DDT to sell it to them. Meanwhile, Xavier has received an unexpected and unwanted visit: his meddlesome cousin Bernard, who has just left his third wife. BTW knows about the sale of the garage and interferes completely. Due to his actions, Boma and Bieke cannot be candidates for the garage. The situation worsens when BTW thinks that De Kampioenen want a hostile mechanic and he sends DDT's competitor Van Roost to Ma DDT. He discovers the mistake and negotiates with the two. Ultimately, Van Roost receives the materials from DDT. BTW buys the property himself to turn it into a restaurant. This makes him the new neighbor of De Kampioenen, but they realize after everything that he is not a good person. Now that DDT is in prison and BTW has the building, Doortje is unemployed. Guest actors: Jakob Beks (Bernard Theofiel Waterslaeghers, BTW; special guest role) - Jenny Tanghe (Georgette "Ma DDT" Verreth) - Sjarel Branckaerts (André Van Roost)
| 106 | 9.02 | "Smakelijk!" | Stef Desmyter | Koen Vermeiren | 5 December 1998 |
It is the opening day of BTW's restaurant. It is named "Bij Mij". Unfortunately, the interior is not yet ready at all. BTW calls on Xavier and Marc to pitch in, although Marc has to cook for Bieke and Doortje in the loft alongside Pol. Meanwhile, Boma has invited Pascale for a romantic dinner, but Colonel Vandesijpe comes up with an interesting proposal: The girls from the Pussycat nightclub. In the end, BTW's opening day goes completely wrong, as expected. Guest actors: Ron Cornet (Colonel Germain Vandesijpe) - Myriam Mulder (Minou) - Hans De Munter (customer at BTW) - Monika Dumon (customer at BTW)
| 107 | 9.03 | "De splinternieuwe trainer" | Stef Desmyter | Wout Thielemans | 12 December 1998 |
Pol gets injured during a match and cannot play. Xavier is criticized not only by the team for his role as coach, but also by Carmen, who has become obsessed with being "the coach's wife". It is decided to make Pol the coach in Xavier's place. As a result, Xavier returns as goalkeeper and Marc becomes the striker. However, Carmen completely disagrees with this: she wants to remain the coach's wife. She leaves Xavier and moves in with BTW, who is still angry with the team because, according to him, they ruined the opening day of his restaurant, so that they can wreak havoc on De Kampioenen together. Due to his new training methods, Pol clashes with both the players and Boma. And BTW soon realizes that Carmen's presence could well mean the downfall of his restaurant. BTW and others try to stop Carmen by lying that Xavier is the coach again, but Boma reveals the truth. He threatens to sell the football pitch once again because of the insults. Carmen is angry with BTW and reveals her plan: She will bully De Kampioenen and him until the team wins a match, which will likely take a long time. De Kampioenen will get another chance if they win the next match. They win that one too, with Pol as coach. Boma changes his mind again. Carmen threatens to leave for good, but it is yet another attempt to remain coach's wife. Eventually, she becomes a special coach's wife, allowing her to get her way for the umpteenth time. It turns out BTW convinced the opposing team to lose so that De Kampioenen can win; in exchange, they can eat at his restaurant. As a result, BTW has his first successful customers at his restaurant. Guest actors: Benny D'Haeseleer (coach op the opposing team)
| 108 | 9.04 | "Bertha Boma" | Stef Desmyter | Bart Cooreman | 19 December 1998 |
Boma neglects his duties as chairman of F.C. De Kampioenen. When his younger sister Bertha Boma shows up from Australia to import kangaroo meat throughout Europe via Boma Vleesindustrie NV, she decides to organize the whole affair. The joy of De Kampioenen soon gives way to dismay when Bertha's tyrannical nature comes to the surface. BTW, however, sees in her the woman of his life, especially when she agrees with him on something for once. Bertha, however, has no interest in BTW. De Kampioenen want Bertha gone, but Boma does not respond to this because of his strict sister. Next, Bertha wants to replace the team, but the match with the new players is disrupted by a protest by Pol and Marc, who tie themselves to the goalposts. This has a bad effect. They catch a cold from the heavy rain. Bertha sells the field and everything that belonged to Boma to someone who has no interest in football. The end of De Kampioenen seems inevitable, until Boma reveals a trick of his: He had Bertha sell the field to Colonel Vandesijpe, who then sells it to him. As a result, Boma is from now on definitively the true owner of the field and everything he is the boss and owner of. BTW discovers that Bertha has returned to Australia, and this puts an end to the romance. De Kampioenen continue to exist. (This does mean, however, that if Boma ever threatens to sell the field again, it makes it easy for him to do so without the help of his sisters.) Guest actors: Stef Van Litsenborgh (agent Jean 'Julien' Michelin) - Camilia Blereau (Bertha Boma) - Johan De Paepe (referee) - Griet Stevens (Bambi) - Jan Van Looveren (goalkeeper of the new F.C. De Kampioenen, uncredited)
| 109 | 9.05 | "De hofleverancier" | Stef Desmyter | Bart Cooreman | 26 December 1998 |
In Carmen's presence, Boma receives a phone call from which he gathers that King Albert himself is coming to pick up one hundred kilos of Boma sausage during De Kampioenen's next match. De Kampioenen pull out all the stops to receive the King in a fitting manner: Pascale even envisions a royal future for her daughter. And BTW organizes a special royal lunch, where guests will be able to dine in the presence of the monarch, in order to finally fill his restaurant. Ultimately, it turns out to be a misunderstanding (yet again). The Albert who called is a restaurant owner. De Kampioenen are angry about this incident, and although Boma views the restaurant as a business partner, the owner refuses to cooperate due to the negative reception from the team. BTW is informed of this as well and angrily sends the customers away. The situation ends completely wrong when BTW refuses to let anyone in. That person turns out to be the real King Albert, who, however, leaves along with his guards because they think it is a misunderstanding regarding BTW's royal lunch. Guest actors: Johan De Paepe (referee) - Luc Springuel (Albert De Koning) - Marcel Vandenbussche (customer at BTW, uncredited)
| 110 | 9.06 | "Bieke culinair" | Stef Desmyter | Wout Thielemans | 2 January 1999 |
To Bieke's delight, Pascale finally breaks up with Boma. BTW wants to have his restaurant reviewed by Publi-Time. For this, he needs a certain "B.C.". Pascale and Bieke think that BTW has his eye on them. One is a bit more enthusiastic about it than the other. De Kampioenen also catch on to the news and try to warn Marc and Boma.
| 111 | 9.07 | "Schone schijn" | Stef Desmyter | Bart Cooreman | 9 January 1999 |
The fact that Pascale and Boma have broken up doesn't seem to bother Pascale. She has a new admirer, and what's more: he is a baron. But when he invites her to dinner and insists on picking her up at her home, Pascale is so ashamed of her café that she arranges a rendezvous at Boma's. When she then goes to Boma to ask if he will help her, Boma mistakenly thinks they are back together. Pascale wants to use Boma's villa as her home. Pol and Xavier help her by distracting Boma. Everything goes according to plan until BTW gets involved. Eventually, the lie comes out and the baron and Pascale split up. Guest actors: Myriam Mulder (Minou) - Peter Rouffaer (baron Jean-Claude Philippe de La Vrillière)
| 112 | 9.08 | "Doortje Waterslaeghers" | Stef Desmyter | René Swartenbroekx | 16 January 1999 |
Now that Doortje is out of work, everyone is taking advantage of her to an extent that is becoming unbelievable. Doortje urgently needs to become more assertive and receives help for this from therapist Truus Pinckers. However, the therapy has unwanted side effects. Doortje turns into a second Carmen, and Xavier falls in love with her. Carmen reveals her frumpiest side and attracts Pol in the process. Bernard faces a surprising encounter. He knows Truus: she was his first wife, and the two were getting married in Las Vegas, but they separated after just one day due to disagreements. Eventually, Doortje and Carmen start acting normally again, and Pol and Xavier return to their wives. Truus and BTW reconcile and decide to remarry, but the plans and their relationship come to an immediate halt when they argue about the wedding date. Guest actors: Vera Puts (Truus Pinckers)
| 113 | 9.09 | "Interim sponsor" | Stef Desmyter | Jan Bergmans | 23 January 1999 |
Valère Vandervleet, a friend of Boma and owner of the football team F.C. Klavertje Vier, asks Boma if he can ensure that De Kampioenen help his team win the next match in exchange for a date with Valère's girlfriend, Lolo. However, De Kampioenen refuse to cooperate and drop Boma as a sponsor. BTW steps forward as the team's new financier, but the collaboration does not go smoothly. Boma seems to take it very hard that he is no longer part of the team—so much so that De Kampioenen think he is contemplating suicide. Later, it turns out this was Boma's plan to secure the date with Lolo, which makes De Kampioenen angry, as they want to win the match. However, they lose due to BTW's interference, and he quits as a sponsor. Boma announces his departure, but everyone (except Bieke) wants him back, so he becomes a sponsor again. Valère visits Boma at the café to give him Lolo and also a partnership with his sausages. Marc, who is present, reveals that the match was won by Valère's team due to BTW. Despite the victory, Valère is angry with Boma for lying and withdraws his plans regarding Lolo and the sausage collaboration. Guest actors: Rudi Delhem (Valère Vandervleet)
| 114 | 9.10 | "Chérie" | Stef Desmyter | Gerrie Van Rompaey | 30 January 1999 |
Doortje and Pol are out on the street because BTW has extended the lease. Eddy Wally is coming to sing at BTW's restaurant. However, when he fails to show up, Xavier has to replace him so that Pol and Doortje can continue living there. Xavier cannot sing, though, so a solution must be found. Boma invites Liliane Verhoeven, the alderwoman for culture, behind Pascale's back. Eventually, Eddy Wally does come to perform. Guest actors: Ron Cornet (Colonel Germain Vandesijpe) - Agnes De Nul (councilor Liliane Verhoeven) - Eddy Wally (himself)
| 115 | 9.11 | "Survival training" | Stef Desmyter | Anton Klee | 6 February 1999 |
The men are thoroughly fed up with their wives' nagging and plan a trip to the Ardennes under the guise of an official survival trek. However, when the women find out about their plan, they take revenge by ensuring the men bring along a highly experienced guide: BTW. That is when the survival trek truly begins. Guest actors: Vicky Florus (Françoise Framboise)
| 116 | 9.12 | "De sollicitatie" | Stef Desmyter | Koen Vermeiren | 13 February 1999 |
Doortje is still out of work, and the situation is becoming dramatic. De Kampioenen do their best to help her find a job, but the results are not exactly encouraging. Meanwhile, BTW needs a hostess for a photo shoot about his restaurant, but that doesn't go smoothly either. Eventually, Doortje gets to work at BTW. Guest actors: Saskia Debaere (Angelique De Coster) - Reinhilde Van Driel (escort girl Trixie)
| 117 | 9.13 | "Boma failliet" | Stef Desmyter | Bart Cooreman | 20 February 1999 |
Bieke has written a scathing article about Boma Vleesindustrie NV, much to Boma's displeasure, of course. Their strained relationship reaches a low point because of this. When Carmen overhears a conversation between Boma and Colonel Vandesijpe about the impending bankruptcy of the Pussycat, she concludes that the Vleesindustrie went bankrupt due to Bieke's fault. For De Kampioenen, the theory is proven when Pascale calls Boma and they realize that their jobs are in danger too. They spring into action to support Boma, and Bieke volunteers to work at the bankrupt company—much to Boma's delight. De Kampioenen try to raise money, but their plan is ruined by BTW, who has meanwhile expressed interest in buying the field. Subsequently, the team decides to give Boma permission to sell the field. The situation is bad for Xavier, as he wanted new goal nets earlier. Eventually, the misunderstanding comes to light when Bieke is required to do what the ladies in the Pussycat are supposed to do, and she is against it. De Kampioenen change their minds about the pitch, causing BTW's plans to fall through and Xavier to see the chance to get goal nets after all. It is also not the only time Bieke writes a scathing article about Boma's meat business. Guest actors: Ron Cornet (Colonel Germain Vandesijpe) - Rudy Morren (Pussycat boss Johnny)

=== Season 10 (1999–2000) ===
==== Main cast ====
- Danni Heylen (Pascale De Backer)
- An Swartenbroeckx (Bieke Crucke)
- Herman Verbruggen (Marc Vertongen)
- Marijn Devalck (Balthasar Boma)
- Ann Tuts (Doortje Van Hoeck) - 9 episodes
- Ben Rottiers (Pol De Tremmerie)
- Loes Van den Heuvel (Carmen Vandormael-Waterslaeghers)
- Johny Voners (Xavier Waterslaeghers)
- Jakob Beks (Bernard Theofiel Waterslaeghers, BTW)
- Moestiek (Nero, Carmen's dog)

==== Regular guest actors ====
(Characters who appear multiple times throughout the series)

- Myriam Mulder (Minou)
- Isabel Leybaert (Pia Maria)
- Agnes De Nul (Liliane Verhoeven, Councilor for Culture and Entertainment)
- Ron Cornet (Colonel Germain Vandesijpe)
- Daan Hugaert (Seppe Van De Kruis)
- Jaak Van Assche (Fernand Costermans)
- Stef Van Litsenborgh (agent Jean 'Julien' Michelin)

==== Crew ====
- Bart Cooreman (scenario)
- Jan Bergmans (scenario)
- Anton Klee (scenario)
- René Swartenbroekx (scenario)
- Gerrie Van Rompaey (scenario)
- Koen Vermeiren (scenario)
- Wout Thielemans (script editor)
- Stef Desmyter (director, E1–E3, E5)
- Etienne Vervoort (director, E4, E6–E13)
- Marc Scheers (producer)
- Bruno Raes (production manager)

| No. overall | No. in season | Title | Directed by | Written by | Original release date |
|---|---|---|---|---|---|
| 118 | 10.01 | "Wie het schoentje past..." | Stef Desmyter | Bart Cooreman | 27 November 1999 |
BTW is convinced that his restaurant will receive a star from the Fijnproeversgids. According to BTW, he won't reach a star because there is a football field right outside his door. The motivation of De Kampioenen is below par. To motivate De Kampioenen, and on BTW's advice, Boma organizes a match for the best player: "De Gulden Schoen". BTW seizes the opportunity to pit De Kampioenen against each other. Jean-Marie Pfaff and Aimé Anthuenis attend the match. The match is a fiasco, causing a quarrel within the group. Boma devises a solution to restore peace within the group. BTW thinks the field already belongs to him. Eventually, BTW's plan comes to light, and the team teaches him a lesson. Guest actors: Anton Cogen (Antoine Ickx) - Jean-Marie Pfaff (himself, uncredited) - Aimé Anthuenis (himself, uncredited)
| 119 | 10.02 | "Monsieur Boma" | Stef Desmyter | Jan Bergmans | 4 December 1999 |
Boma receives a visit from a school friend, Charles, who urges him to turn the football field into a golf course. Boma is quite keen on the idea and turns all the members of De Kampioenen against him. Only Pascale stands on his side, because she dreams of transforming the café into a golf club. That is, until she learns that Boma wants to turn the BTW restaurant into a golf club, not her café. De Kampioenen therefore challenge Boma to a golf duel. Xavier is supposed to compete against Boma but gets injured, so Marc, who was actually supposed to help Boma, takes Xavier's place and wins the duel. Boma does not accept De Kampioenen's victory and plans to sell the field. However, he discovers Charles's lies, causing the friendship to end and Boma to change his mind. Forgiveness from De Kampioenen is difficult, but Boma stays with them. Guest actors: Warre Borgmans (Charles)
| 120 | 10.03 | "Het aanzoek" | Stef Desmyter | Bart Cooreman | 11 December 1999 |
Marc is egged on by Pascale to propose to Bieke. On Xavier's advice, he seeks advice from BTW. With his three failed marriages, he is surely a specialist in the matter! However, BTW is convinced that Marc and Bieke are not a good match and decides to help Marc find the woman of his life, against his will. According to BTW, that is Doortje. Subsequently, everything comes out. Doortje and Pol stay together, and Marc stays with Bieke. Bieke is happy that Marc might propose to her at any moment. However, due to advice from BTW that was not properly understood, Marc refuses to propose to Bieke. She reacts with surprise, but the episode ends. The next episode reveals that they are staying together, but there are no wedding plans, causing Pascale's plans to fail. Guest actors: Danny Riesterer (moviegoer, uncredited)
| 121 | 10.04 | "Chez Nero" | Etienne Vervoort | Anton Klee | 18 December 1999 |
Carmen wants to open a restaurant. After a failed attempt in her newspaper shop, she tries her luck in the café. Boma has an argument with Pascale after she made fun of him in front of a customer. To get revenge, he gives permission for Carmen to set up her restaurant in the café. Running a restaurant turns out to be more difficult for Carmen than expected. Eventually, Carmen abandons her plans, and Boma's revenge plan fails completely. Guest actors: Myriam Mulder (Minou)
| 122 | 10.05 | "Werk aan de winkel" | Stef Desmyter | René Swartenbroekx | 25 December 1999 |
Bieke, BTW, Carmen, and Boma want to get a television program on the regional channel. Karl Vermeire, the owner of the TV channel, wants to seduce Bieke. That is why he tries to convince Marc to break up with her. Guest actors: Isabel Leybaert (Pia Maria) - Aimé Anthoni (Karl Vermeire)
| 123 | 10.06 | "Casanova Vertongen" | Etienne Vervoort | Gerrie Van Rompaey | 1 January 2000 |
De Kampioenen face a difficult medical check-up, performed by the strict doctor Saskia Hengelen. Xavier, in particular, is in trouble. When it turns out that Marc knows Saskia from university, Xavier asks if he can put in a good word for her. But Marc is too shy to approach her and asks Boma to help him. To do so, Marc receives a "seducing women" course from Boma. Xavier wants to pass the examination, but to do so, he has to go on a diet. BTW helps him with his "sports diet." In the end, things work out for the team, but not for Xavier and BTW. Guest actors: Myriam Mulder (Minou) - Anne Denolf (Doctor Saskia Engelen)
| 124 | 10.07 | "Bomeo en Julia" | Etienne Vervoort | Koen Vermeiren | 8 January 2000 |
A cultural prize is announced in the village of De Kampioenen. De Kampioenen decide to stage Romeo and Juliet. However, the rehearsals do not go smoothly. BTW, for his part, thinks he can win the prize by organizing a 'BTW Goes Classic' evening. To increase his chances, he begins to sabotage De Kampioenen. His sabotage, the team's improvisation, and Marc not sticking to his role after all, ensure that the play becomes original in the eyes of the jury, and ultimately, De Kampioenen win the cultural prize. Guest actors: Agnes De Nul (councilor Liliane Verhoeven)
| 125 | 10.08 | "België - Holland" | Etienne Vervoort | Bart Cooreman | 15 January 2000 |
De Kampioenen are hosting a football team from the Netherlands for a friendly match and a training camp. Everyone is required to take in a number of players from this team. When the Dutch team arrives, it turns out to be a women's team. The men are perfectly fine with this, but the players' wives have more issues with it. BTW thinks the Dutch will make good customers. Guest actors: Brechtje Louwaard (Ellemijn) - Hadewig Kras (Esther), Caroline Rottier (Kitty), Carl Huybrechts (himself)
| 126 | 10.09 | "Nero superstar" | Etienne Vervoort | Bart Cooreman | 22 January 2000 |
A commercial producer sees Nero as the ideal lead for his next spot. Carmen is optimistic and already envisions Nero ending up in Hollywood, as well as herself. Boma is also pleased with the news and wants to sponsor Nero. Carmen enlists Marc as a bodyguard for Nero. However, during a match where Nero kicks off and Carmen dresses up as Marilyn Monroe, Nero escapes from Marc and ends up in the BTW trash can without anyone knowing. Carmen is immediately shocked and thinks Nero is dead or kidnapped. The death scenario seems to become real before her eyes when she remembers how BTW previously threatened to cook Nero and she sees a piece of food in the BTW restaurant kitchen that appears to be Nero's remains. Meanwhile, BTW decides to lure customers by putting rabbit on the menu. Now they just need to find someone willing to kill that sweet little animal. Doortje is against killing the rabbit. Subsequently, BTW decides not to kill the rabbit after all and chases away the customer who ordered it. Eventually, Doortje finds Nero in the trash can and brings him to Carmen during Nero's "funeral". The producer stops by and, prompted by a question from Boma, reveals that the commercial is actually for cat food, featuring a cat that gets stronger and has to take on "villain Nero" or the underdog. Carmen is against it and backs out despite protests from Boma, who is keen on the idea. Boma is forced to sell the Nero merchandise, without success. After the events of the episode, the rabbit becomes BTW's new pet. Guest actors: Kristiaan Lagast (Jean Van Opstal) - Gerd De Ley (customer at BTW)
| 127 | 10.10 | "Waterslaeghers senior" | Etienne Vervoort | Gerrie Van Rompaey | 29 January 2000 |
BTW's father (Bernard-Victor), a wealthy beer brewer, disrupts a match of De Kampioenen. He comes to check on BTW's restaurant, revealing that he is financing it. Boma and Pol are angry that Bernard-Victor is ruining the match, but change their minds due to Bernard-Victor's wealthy status, causing Boma to dream of a possible collaboration and Pol of a new sponsor for the team. Xavier is also happy with Bernard-Victor; he turns out to be the one who sparked Xavier's love for beer. Xavier gets the chance to work for him. BTW pretends to have a new girlfriend. Bernard-Victor refuses to leave without meeting his future daughter-in-law. Meanwhile, BTW's father also causes major disagreement between Carmen and Xavier. Xavier starts to find Bernard-Victor annoying after all, and he and Pol try to help BTW find a girlfriend without Bernard-Victor finding out. Marc has to play the girlfriend. This seems to be working until Bieke goes looking for Marc and, despite opposition from Xavier and Pol, disrupts and sabotages the dinner with BTW, Marc, Bernard-Victor, and his girlfriend. As a result, the truth comes out, and Bernard-Victor is furious. He leaves and decides not to finance BTW's restaurant anymore, not to become a sponsor of the team, and not to let Xavier work in his brewery. Later in the season, the consequences for BTW and his restaurant following the events of this episode become clear. Guest actors: Werther Vander Sarren (Bernard-Victor Waterslaeghers) - Anne Somers (girlfriend of Bernard-Victor) - Maya Moreel (girlfriend of Boma) Absent: Ann Tuts (Doortje Van Hoeck)
| 128 | 10.11 | "Kolonel Waterslaeghers" | Etienne Vervoort | Bart Cooreman | 5 February 2000 |
Carmen accidentally meets an old classmate: Suzanne Verspecht. Suzanne always made Carmen's life miserable. To get the better of her, Carmen claims that Xavier has made a career in the army and even become a colonel. But when Suzanne becomes BTW's new girlfriend and therefore stays living in the neighborhood, Carmen and Xavier have no choice but to stage the white lie. De Kampioenen try to help Carmen, but the real colonel is lying in wait. Suzanne, a man-eater, has set her sights on BTW, Pol, and Xavier himself. Pascale is forced to keep Vandesijpe with her to make Carmen's plan succeed. She cannot control herself due to Vandesijpe's obsession with women. Eventually, it turns out that Vandesijpe knows Suzanne from a bad past, which leaves Suzanne humiliated. Vandesijpe catches Xavier in his uniform, but due to the circumstances, Xavier is not punished. Guest actors: Ron Cornet (Colonel Germain Vandesijpe) - Daan Hugaert (Seppe Van De Kruis) - Lut Hannes (Suzanne Verspecht) Absent: Ann Tuts (Doortje Van Hoeck)
| 129 | 10.12 | "Voorrang van rechts" | Etienne Vervoort | Jan Bergmans | 12 February 2000 |
Marc is temporarily an auxiliary police officer. BTW sees this as new opportunities to bully De Kampioenen. Pascale wins a car in a raffle. She now has to get her driver's license from Bieke, because she is tired of playing chauffeur. However, this does not go smoothly. The other Kampioenen try to help Pascale drive, including Boma. Because Boma suddenly brakes unexpectedly, he, Pascale, and the rest of De Kampioenen come into contact with antique dealer Fernand Costermans for the first time. Fernand turns out to be a real swindler and money-grubber who constantly shifts the blame onto someone else. Due to BTW's actions, Marc is fired from the police force. Eventually, Pascale gets her car, but this time she has to transport Bieke when her own car is damaged in a collision with Fernand. Guest actors: Jaak Van Assche (Fernand Costermans) - Stef Van Litsenborgh (agent Jean 'Julien' Michelin) - Knarf Van Pellecom (Harry van Hardy) Absent: Ann Tuts (Doortje Van Hoeck)
| 130 | 10.13 | "Totale uitverkoop" | Etienne Vervoort | Koen Vermeiren | 19 February 2000 |
Pascale receives antique furniture from her sister Madeleine. Among the worthless pieces, the buyer does find a figurine worth a lot of money. However, the second figurine needed for the sale is already in the hands of someone else (in this case, Colonel Vandesijpe). Things have not been going well for BTW's restaurant since his father (Bernard-Victor) cut off the funding. That is why he is looking for investors. BTW convinces Boma to invest in his restaurant, but his obsession with his bad Boma sausages causes the partnership to be terminated. Meanwhile, BTW has his junk sold to Fernand Costermans. The latter lies multiple times, including about his "sick children," and BTW falls for it. Fernand has his own problems because his antique shop is being demolished due to illegal construction, and he really wants the restaurant. However, BTW does not want to give up the restaurant. Fernand deliberately spreads the rumor in the café that "Bij Mij" will be demolished by the municipality. Pol is in shock and notifies BTW, who does not believe it. He suddenly receives a (fake) letter, supposedly from the municipality, with the news that his restaurant was built illegally. BTW wants to get rid of his restaurant as soon as possible and hastily sells it to Fernand, who, however, drafted this letter himself. The truth comes out, but it is too late. Pascale manages to return both figurines to the antique dealer, whom Fernand knows as a major con artist, after the figurines had been in the possession of several people. But then an argument erupts over who owns them, and BTW takes the figurines with him when he leaves, causing De Kampioenen to chase after him. Ultimately, the deal falls through and no one receives any extra money. At the end of the episode, Fernand immediately tries to cheat Marc, and Marc's confusion causes him to burst into laughter, which is the final scene of the season and officially confirms that Fernand is the new neighbor of De Kampioenen and also their enemy, given his behavior throughout this and the previous episode. Guest actors: Jaak Van Assche (Fernand Costermans) - Ron Cornet (Colonel Germain Vandesijpe) - John Willaert (antique dealer Kriekemans) - Sadi Seghers (customer at BTW) Absent: Ann Tuts (Doortje Van Hoeck)

== Trivia ==
- At the beginning of the first season (1990), actor and politician Walter De Donder played one of the team's players. He can be seen in the episodes De nieuwe truitjes, Vogelvrij, Het record, Doortje, and Carmens wasmachine. He later also played guest roles in the episodes De haptonoom (1992) of season 3 as Mr. Schepers and Voedselvergiftiging (2006) of season 16 as Inspector Kimpe.
- In the episode "Bij Xavier" (1996), Bob Van Der Veken, Jacky Morel, and Manu Verreth reprised their roles from the comedy-drama BRT series De Collega's as Paul Thienpondt, Hilaire Baconfoy, and Jomme Dockx. Contrary to the series, the group turned out to be working at the Ministry of Employment. Gilbert Van Hie (Tuur De Weert) and Jean De Pesser (Jaak Van Assche) were also mentioned. Van Assche and De Weert later appeared in this sitcom as Fernand Costermans and Maurice de Praetere (with De Weert, who also had guest roles in season 7 (1997) and season 12 (2001)). Johny Voners also appeared in De Collega's, but did not have a scene with his co-stars from back then.
- In the episode "Sinterklaas kampioentje" (1996), actor and presenter Frank Dingenen reprised his role from Meester, hij begint weer! and Meester! as teacher André Buys. In this sitcom, André Buys is a colleague of Pol. Bob Davidse also previously played Sinterklaas in the children's series Samson en Gert from 1990 to 1995.
- In the 14th season (2004), there were some guest roles that coincidentally resemble or refer to roles in the soap opera Thuis, where some crew members of that series also worked at the time. It has not been confirmed whether that was done intentionally by the crew or if it was pure coincidence.
  - Jan Schepens' guest role as Stijn Dierickx in the episode '"Zet ’m op!" bears a strong resemblance to the role of Pierre Vinck in Thuis. Both characters are crazy, are obsessed with a specific woman (Dierickx with ex-girlfriend Bieke and Vinck with his sister Vera Vinck, who goes through life as Valerie Wijndaele), and eventually set fire to a home (Dierickx at Bieke and Marc's loft and Vinck at the Verbist family's house).
  - In the episode "Met twee aan zee", Peter Van Asbroeck played a motorcyclist. This may refer to his role in Thuis as Werner Van Sevenant, who is also a motorcyclist.
  - In the episode "O sole mio", guest actors Mark Tijsmans and Gert Lahousse played a duo together. Earlier in Thuis, specifically in season 1, they played drug dealers Bennie De Taeye and Neil Feyaerts, who were also sometimes together on and off screen.
- Right at the beginning of the episode "Pol in de put" (2004), Studio Brussel presenters Otto-Jan Ham and Stijn Van de Voorde appeared in a cameo as colleagues of Pol and Juul.
- In the episode "Het huwelijk" (2005), the role of master of ceremonies is played by Guido De Craene. During the filming of this episode, Guido and An Swartenbroekx met and sealed this friendship with a marriage in 2006.
- In the episode "Home sweet home" (2009), actors Gunter Reniers and Bianca Vanhaverbeke appeared as a bickering couple going through a divorce. Coincidentally, years earlier, the two played a couple (Julien Van Praet and Charlotte Van Mechelen) in the comedy series Hallo België! on the VTM channel.
- In the episode "Heldendaad" (2011), a few of the guest actors reprised their roles from other series and programs. Walter Baele once again played Philippe of Belgium, a role he had previously portrayed in Wij van België, Tegen de Sterren op, Samson en Gert: Het verrassingsfeest, and later in Sterregem. Mark Tijsmans and Andrea Croonenberghs reprised their roles from the Eén police series Flikken as Wilfried Pasmans and Britt Michiels.
