= Agnes De Nul =

Belgian actress (born 1955)

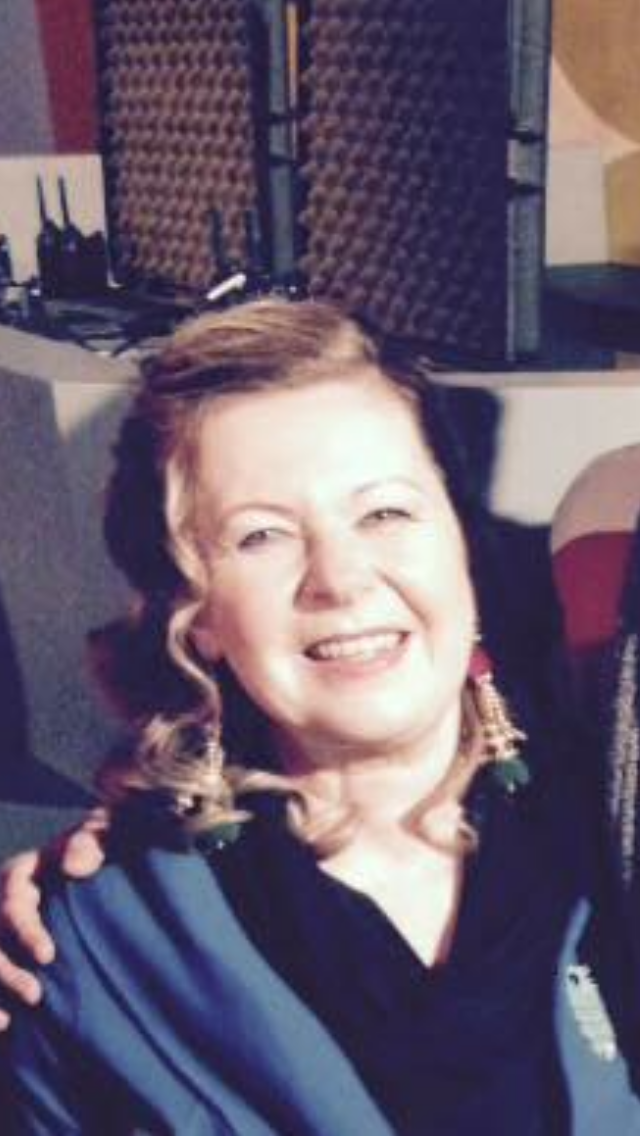
- Born: March 17, 1955 (age 70)
- Occupation: Actor

Agnes De Nul (March 17, 1955) is a Belgian actor. She is especially known for her role as Kabouter Kwebbel in the television series Kabouter Plop. She also played the drama teacher in Ghost Rockers.
