= Jacques Vermeire =

Belgian comedian, actor and presenter (born 1951)

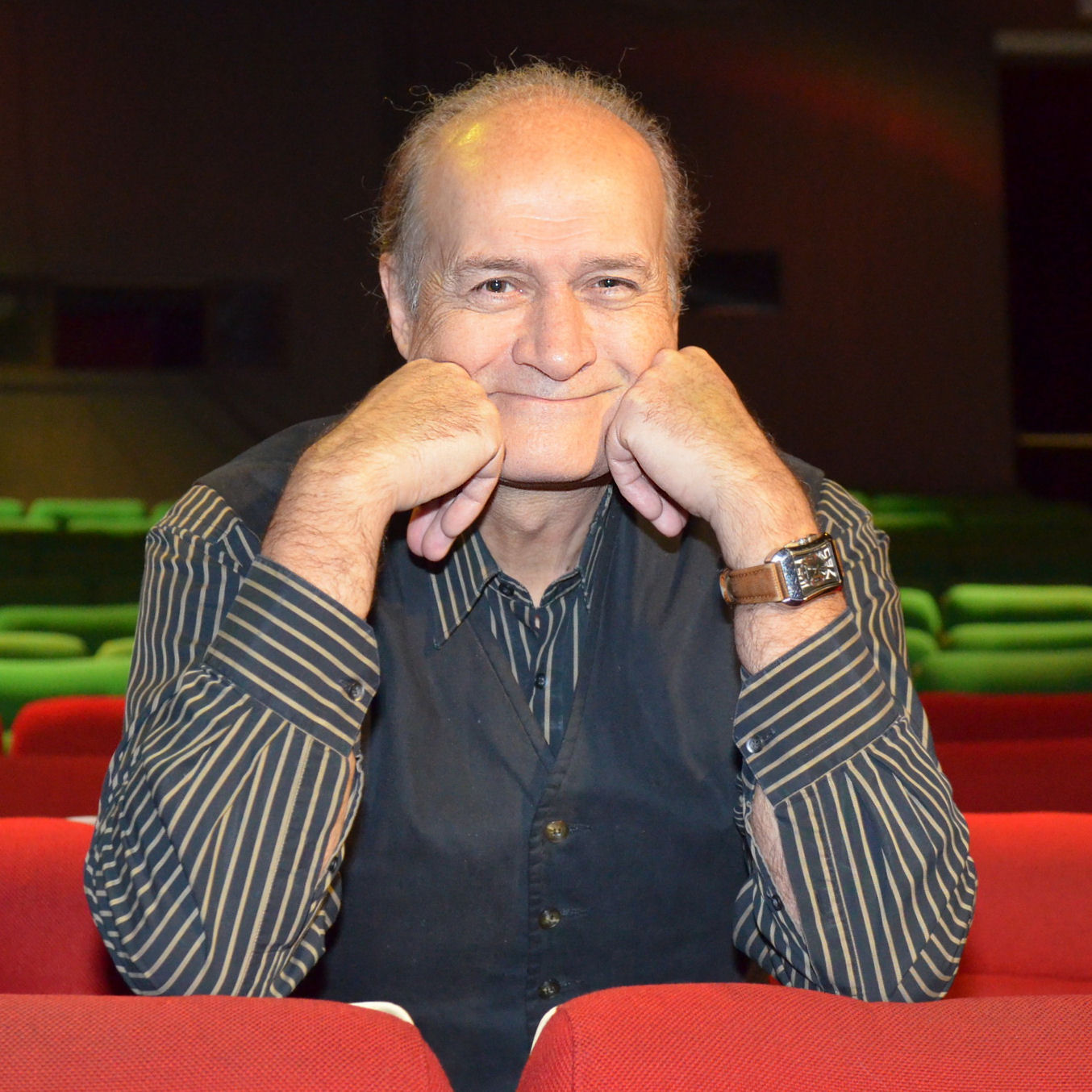
- Vermeire in 2013
- Born: 27 May 1951 (age 75); Antwerp, Belgium
- Occupations: Comedian, actor, singer, presenter
- Website: jacquesvermeire.be

Jacques Vermeire (born May 27, 1951, in Antwerp, Belgium) is a Flemish comedian, actor, singer, and television presenter who has been one of the most recognizable figures in Belgian entertainment for decades. He first gained national attention in the 1980s through the BRT radio program Sportkaffee and became widely popular as a panelist on the television show De Drie Wijzen.

Vermeire is best known for playing the unforgettable garage owner Dimitri "DDT" De Tremmerie in the long-running sitcom F.C. De Kampioenen. He also starred in the successful 1994 comedy film Max and later became a prominent face on VTM with his own comedy and entertainment shows. Throughout his career, he has combined television work with live comedy performances, earning a reputation for his expressive facial humor, memorable characters, and energetic stage presence.

Beyond acting and comedy, Vermeire has remained active in theatre, television, and family entertainment. He is the father of dancer and television personality Julie Vermeire. Vermeire has been described as a pioneer of Flemish comedy whose work has influenced generations of audiences.
