= Geert Deferm =

Belgian footballer (born 1963)

Personal information
- Full name: Geert Deferm
- Date of birth: 6 May 1963 (age 63)
- Place of birth: Hasselt, Belgium
- Position: Left back

Senior career*
Years	Team	Apps	(Gls)
1981–1983	FC Winterslag		
1983–1985	KV Mechelen		
1985–1986	Antwerp FC		
1986–1994	KV Mechelen		
1994–1995	AA Gent		
1995–1996	La Louvière		
1996–1997	Amiens SC		
- * Club domestic league appearances and goals

Geert Deferm (born 6 May 1963 in Hasselt) is a Belgian former footballer.

== Honours ==
KV Mechelen

- Belgian First Division: 1988–89
- Belgian Cup: 1986–87 (winners), 1990–91 (runners-up), 1991–92 (runners-up)
- European Cup Winners Cup: 1987–88 (winners)
- European Super Cup: 1988
- Amsterdam Tournament: 1989
- Joan Gamper Trophy: 1989
- Jules Pappaert Cup: 1990
