= Koen Sanders =

Belgian footballer (born 1962)

Personal information
- Full name: Koenraad Sanders
- Date of birth: 17 December 1962 (age 63)
- Place of birth: Deurne, Belgium
- Height: 1.78 m (5 ft 10 in)
- Position: Midfielder

Senior career*
Years	Team	Apps	(Gls)
1980–1984	Club Brugge	70	(6)
1984–1995	KV Mechelen	328	(18)
1995–1997	KRC Harelbeke	32	(0)
1997–1998	Wevelgem City	13	(0)
Total		443	(24)

International career
1989–1990	Belgium	4	(0)
- * Club domestic league appearances and goals

Koenraad Sanders (Bruges, 17 December 1962) is a Belgian former footballer who played as a midfielder. He is the younger brother of footballer Luc Sanders.

== Honours ==
Club Brugge

- Belgian Cup runner-up: 1982–83
- Belgian Supercup: 1980
- Bruges Matins: 1981
- Japan Cup Kirin World Soccer: 1981

KV Mechelen

- Belgian First Division: 1988–89
- Belgian Cup: 1986–87; runner-up 1990–91, 1991–92
- European Cup Winners Cup: 1987–88
- European Super Cup: 1988
- Amsterdam Tournament: 1989
- Joan Gamper Trophy: 1989
- Jules Pappaert Cup: 1990
