= Erwin Koeman =

Dutch footballer and manager (born 1961)

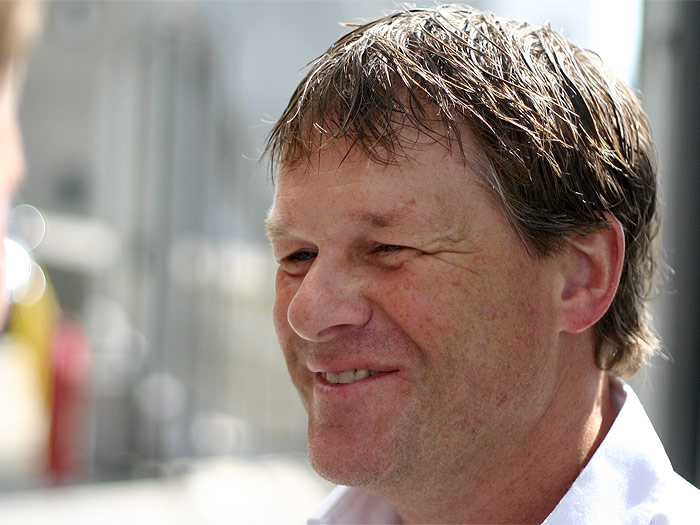
- Koeman in 2011

Personal information
- Full name: Erwin Koeman
- Date of birth: 20 September 1961 (age 65)
- Place of birth: Zaandam, Netherlands
- Height: 1.80 m (5 ft 11 in)
- Position: Midfielder

Senior career*
Years	Team	Apps	(Gls)
1978–1979	Groningen	6	(0)
1979–1982	PSV	43	(8)
1982–1985	Groningen	89	(39)
1985–1990	Mechelen	116	(22)
1990–1994	PSV	104	(14)
1994–1998	Groningen	115	(10)
Total		472	(92)

International career
1983–1994	Netherlands	31	(2)

Managerial career
- 2004–2005: RKC Waalwijk
- 2005–2007: Feyenoord
- 2008–2010: Hungary
- 2011: Utrecht
- 2012: Eindhoven
- 2012–2014: RKC Waalwijk
- 2018: Fenerbahçe (caretaker)
- 2019: Oman
- 2021: Beitar Jerusalem
- 2022–: Netherlands (assistant coach)
Medal record
Representing Netherlands
Men's football
UEFA European Championship
Winner	1988
- * Club domestic league appearances and goals

Erwin Koeman (born 20 September 1961) is a Dutch former professional football player who currently serves as an assistant coach for the Netherlands national team.

As a midfielder, he played in three spells at Groningen and two at PSV Eindhoven, as well as winning national and European trophies at Mechelen in Belgium. He earned 31 caps for the Netherlands between 1983 and 1994, being part of the team that won UEFA Euro 1988 and played at the 1990 FIFA World Cup.

Koeman managed Feyenoord, RKC Waalwijk (twice) and Utrecht in the Eredivisie, as well as the national teams of Hungary and Oman. He also served as an assistant manager to his younger brother Ronald Koeman at Premier League clubs Southampton and Everton, and the Netherlands national team.

== Personal life ==
Born in Zaanstad, North Holland, Koeman is the son of Dutch international footballer Martin Koeman, and older brother of Ronald, who also represented the Netherlands and became a manager. All three Koemans played for Groningen at some time during their careers. Erwin Koeman's son, Len, played for the Helmond Sport youth team, but did not have a senior career. A statue of the three Koemans was unveiled at Groningen's Euroborg stadium in 2021.

== Playing career ==
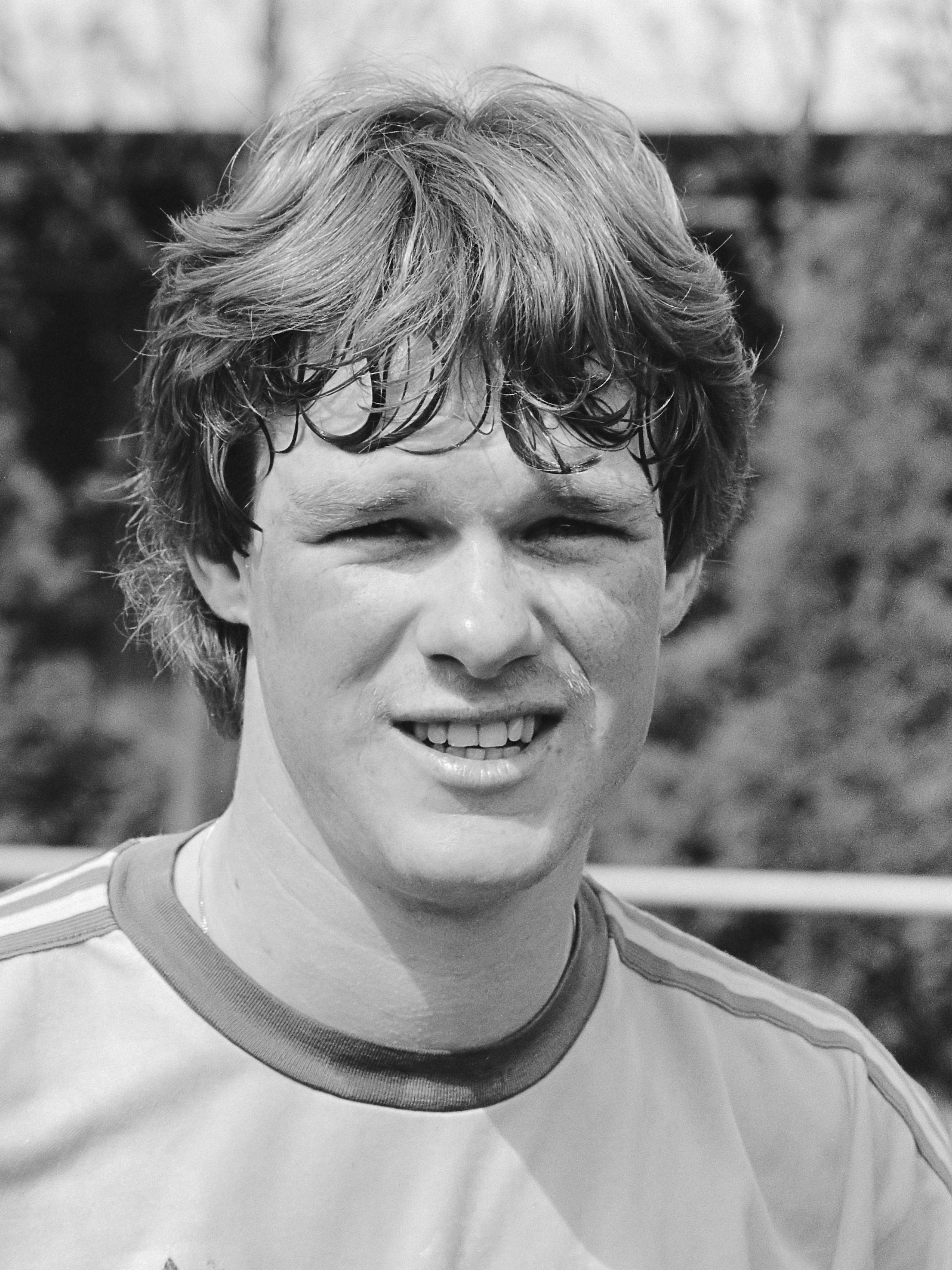
Koeman in training with the national squad, 1983

A midfielder, Koeman played with Groningen, Mechelen – where he won the Belgian League in 1989 and 1988 Cup Winners' Cup during the team's heyday – and PSV, where they became league champions in 1990–91 and 1991–92 seasons.

== International career ==
In April 1983, Erwin Koeman and his brother Ronald debuted for the Netherlands national football team during a 3–0 friendly loss against Sweden in Utrecht.

Koeman was part of the Dutch squads for UEFA Euro 1988 and 1990 FIFA World Cup, winning the former. He missed a possible selection for 1994 FIFA World Cup due to an injury in April 1994.

== Managerial career ==
=== Early career ===
Koeman finished his playing career with Groningen in 1998 and became youth coach at PSV. In October 2001, he was promoted to assistant manager under Eric Gerets, and for the 2004–05 season became manager in RKC Waalwijk. He managed RKC for one season before moving to Feyenoord. In March 2006, he extended his contract to the summer 2009. However, on 3 May 2007, Koeman announced his immediate resignation due to motivational problems, after a troublesome season, where Feyenoord eventually finished seventh.

=== Hungary ===
On 24 April 2008, Koeman became the coach of the Hungary national football team. On his debut on 23 May, the team won 3–2 at home to European champions Greece in a friendly; the visitors had not lost since August. The team failed to qualify for the 2010 FIFA World Cup, and Koeman did not win any of his last four games, the final one being a 6–1 loss to his native Netherlands in June 2010; on 23 July he was dismissed and under-20 manager Sándor Egervári promoted to his place.

=== Return to the Netherlands ===
Before the 2011–12 season, Koeman was appointed as the new manager of Utrecht on a one-year deal. Disputes with the board began almost immediately as Rodney Sneijder was signed without his approval; on 18 October 2011 he resigned.

On 17 March 2012, Koeman was hired at FC Eindhoven, third-placed in the Eerste Divisie, after Ernest Faber crossed the city to PSV. After a play-off loss to Helmond, he moved on a two-year deal back to the top flight and Waalwijk for the following season. His second spell at Waalwijk ended in May 2014 with relegation after a 4–2 aggregate playoff loss to Excelsior Rotterdam.

=== Assistant manager ===
On 16 June 2014, Koeman was appointed as assistant to his brother Ronald at English Premier League team Southampton. The siblings moved to Everton in the same league two years later. Ronald Koeman was dismissed in October 2017 with the team third from bottom, with most of his staff, including Erwin Koeman leaving with him.

On 3 August 2018, Koeman became compatriot Phillip Cocu's assistant at Fenerbahçe. Cocu was dismissed at the end of October with the team in 15th in the Süper Lig, and Koeman became caretaker manager, debuting on 2 November with a 2–2 draw at Galatasaray in the Intercontinental Derby. He helped the team into the knockout stages of the UEFA Europa League, before the appointment of Ersun Yanal on 14 December.

=== Oman ===
In February 2019, Koeman was appointed as the new head coach of Oman, succeeding fellow Netherlands national team member Pim Verbeek, who had taken the team to their first knockout stage of the AFC Asian Cup. Koeman signed a two-year deal and was tasked with qualifying the team for the 2022 FIFA World Cup in nearby Qatar. He debuted on 20 March with a 5–0 win over Afghanistan in the 2019 Airmarine Cup in Kuala Lumpur, followed two days later with a penalty shootout win in the final against Singapore. He was fired on 16 December, after a group-stage exit as holders at the 24th Arabian Gulf Cup.

=== Later career ===
In June 2021, Koeman was appointed as manager of Beitar Jerusalem in the Israeli Premier League. He had played with their sporting director, Eli Ohana, at Mechelen. He resigned six months later, with his last game being a 2–0 loss at Bnei Sakhnin.

In May 2022, Koeman was announced as an assistant coach to his brother Ronald at the Netherlands national team, and would commence in the role on 1 January 2023 after the 2022 FIFA World Cup in Qatar.

== Career statistics ==
=== International ===
Appearances and goals by national team and year
National team	Year	Apps	Goals
Netherlands	1983	4	0
Netherlands	1984	1	0
Netherlands	1985	2	1
Netherlands	1986	1	0
Netherlands	1987	0	0
Netherlands	1988	8	0
Netherlands	1989	4	1
Netherlands	1990	5	0
Netherlands	1991	2	0
Netherlands	1992	1	0
Netherlands	1993	2	0
Netherlands	1994	1	0
Total		31	2

Scores and results list the Netherlands' goal tally first, score column indicates score after each Koeman goal.

List of international goals scored by Erwin Koeman
No.	Date	Venue	Opponent	Score	Result	Competition
1	27 February 1985	De Meer, Amsterdam, Netherlands	Cyprus	1–1	7–1	1986 FIFA World Cup qualification
2	15 November 1989	De Kuip, Rotterdam, Netherlands	Finland	2–0	3–0	1990 FIFA World Cup qualification

== Managerial statistics ==
As of match played 30 November 2021

Managerial record by team and tenure
Team	From	To	Record				
Team	From	To	P	W	D	L	Win %
RKC Waalwijk	July 2004	June 2005	38	15	10	13	39.47
Feyenoord	July 2005	May 2007	81	38	21	22	46.91
Hungary	April 2008	July 2010	20	7	4	9	35.00
Utrecht	July 2011	October 2011	10	3	4	3	30.00
Eindhoven	March 2012	June 2012	9	3	2	4	33.33
RKC Waalwijk	July 2012	June 2014	75	18	23	34	24.00
Fenerbahçe	November 2018	December 2018	9	3	3	3	33.33
Oman	February 2019	December 2019	12	8	2	2	66.67
Beitar Jerusalem	July 2021	November 2021	11	3	3	5	27.27
Total			265	98	72	95	36.98

== Honours ==
KV Mechelen

- Belgian First Division: 1988–89
- Belgian Cup: Winners: 1986–87, runners-up: 1990–91, 1991–92
- European Cup Winners Cup: 1987-1988
- European Super Cup: 1988
- Amsterdam Tournament: 1989
- Joan Gamper Trophy: 1989
- Jules Pappaert Cup: 1990

PSV

- Eredivisie: 1990–91, 1991–92
- Dutch Super Cup (in 1996 renamed to Johan Cruyff Shield): 1992; runner-up: 1991

Netherlands

- UEFA European Championship: 1988
