= Pascal De Wilde =

Belgian association football player

Personal information
- Full name: Pascal De Wilde
- Date of birth: 1 May 1965 (age 61)
- Place of birth: Bruges, Belgium
- Position: Attacking midfielder

Senior career*
Years	Team	Apps	(Gls)
1984–1985	Club Brugge		
1985–1987	Harelbeke		
1987–1991	Mechelen		
1993–1994	Valenciennes		
1994–1995	Harelbeke		
1996–1997	Hoogstraten		
- * Club domestic league appearances and goals

Pascal De Wilde (1 May 1965) is a former Belgian footballer who played as attacking midfielder. Born in Bruges, he is of Congolese descent.

== Honours ==
KV Mechelen

- Belgian First Division: 1988–89
- European Cup Winners Cup: 1987–88
- European Super Cup: 1988
