= Lei Clijsters =

Belgian footballer (1956–2009)

- Clijsters with the Golden Shoe in 1988

Personal information
- Full name: Leo Albert Jozef Clijsters
- Date of birth: 6 November 1956
- Place of birth: Opitter, Belgium
- Date of death: 4 January 2009 (aged 52)
- Place of death: Gruitrode, Belgium
- Height: 1.78 m (5 ft 10 in)
- Position: Centre-back

Youth career
- 1968–1973: Opitter

Senior career*
Years	Team	Apps	(Gls)
1973–1975	Club Brugge	1	(0)
1975–1977	Patro Eisden	29	(1)
1977–1982	Tongeren	167	(22)
1982–1986	Thor Waterschei	119	(6)
1986–1992	Mechelen	174	(13)
1992–1993	FC Liège	21	(0)
Total		511	(42)

International career
1983–1991	Belgium	40	(3)

Managerial career
- 1993–1994: Patro Eisden
- 1994–1997: Gent
- 1998: Lommel SK
- 1999–2000: Diest
- 2000: Mechelen
- 2000–2001: Diest
- 2007–2008: Tongeren
- * Club domestic league appearances and goals

Leo Albert Jozef "Lei" Clijsters (6 November 1956 – 4 January 2009) was a Belgian professional footballer who played as a centre-back.

Throughout his extensive senior career, the tough stopper was mainly associated with KV Mechelen, with whom he won the UEFA Cup Winners' Cup and the UEFA Super Cup. Also a prominent member of the Belgium national team, he was the father of tennis players Kim and Elke Clijsters.

== Club career ==
Lei Clijsters was born on 6 November 1956 in Opitter, started his football career with local Opitter FC. Later, he played for Club Brugge KV, but left the club after a disappointing two-year stint; he started his career as a midfielder. Subsequently, Clijsters represented Tongeren, Patro Eisden, Waterschei Thor, KV Mechelen and RFC Liège. With Mechelen, he won the Belgian Cup in 1987, going on to conquer the subsequent UEFA Cup Winners' Cup and European Super Cup. He added the Belgian League in 1988–89, always as club captain.

In 1988, Clijsters also won the Golden Shoe award as league's MVP, and eventually retired with Liège at almost 37. Immediately, he starting working as a manager with former club Patro Eisden, then moving to Gent, KFC Lommel SK (July–December 1998), K. Tesamen Hogerop Diest (two spells, in 1999–2000 and November 2000 – June 2001) and Mechelen (July–November 2000). Clijsters was endorsed by Diadora.

Afterward, he managed the professional tennis career of his daughter Kim. After her retirement, "Lei" became coach of third division club Tongeren, with which he had also played, in October 2007. He resigned in January 2008, after his family announced that he was suffering from a serious illness. Details were kept secret, but in February the Belgian press reported it to be metastatic melanoma and that treatment was not working.

== International career ==
Clijsters played in 40 international matches for the Belgium national team, participating at UEFA Euro 1984 and the 1986 and 1990 FIFA World Cups.

In the 1986 edition, as Belgium reached the last four, he only appeared in two matches (being used as a substitute in the 2–1 win over Iraq and the famous round of 16 4–3 victory over the USSR.

In 1990, Clijsters saw action against South Korea (2–0 win), Uruguay (in which he scored a header in a 3–1 triumph) and England (1–0 loss after extra time).

== Personal life ==
Clijsters was married to Els Vandecaetsbeek from 1982 until 2005.

== Death ==
On 4 January 2009, Clijsters succumbed to an illness at age 52. Upon his death, Belgian newspapers like Het Laatste Nieuws revealed that he suffered from a recurrence of melanoma which had spread to the lungs and other organs, having already experienced a bout of this condition twenty-five years earlier.

== Honours ==
=== Player ===
KV Mechelen

- Belgian First Division: 1988–89
- Belgian Cup: 1986–87; runner-up 1990–91, 1991–92
- European Cup Winners Cup: 1987–88
- European Super Cup: 1988
- Amsterdam Tournament: 1989
- Joan Gamper Trophy: 1989
- Jules Pappaert Cup: 1990

Belgium

- FIFA World Cup: fourth place 1986

Individual

- Belgian Golden Shoe: 1988
- Platina Eleven (Best Team in 50 Years of Golden Shoe Winners) (2003)
- Pro League Hall of Fame: 2026
