= John Bosman =

Dutch footballer (born 1965)

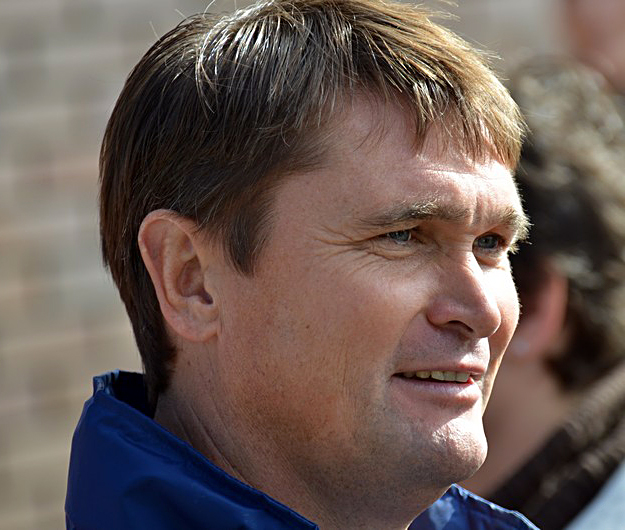
- Bosman in 2011

Personal information
- Full name: Johannes Jacobus Bosman
- Date of birth: 1 February 1965 (age 61)
- Place of birth: Bovenkerk, Netherlands
- Height: 1.87 m (6 ft 2 in)
- Position: Forward

Youth career
- Roda '23
- RKAVIC

Senior career*
| Years | Team | Apps | (Gls) |
| 1983–1988 | Ajax | 125 | (77) |
| 1988–1990 | Mechelen | 61 | (34) |
| 1990–1991 | PSV | 30 | (11) |
| 1991–1996 | Anderlecht | 156 | (70) |
| 1996–1999 | Twente | 87 | (34) |
| 1999–2002 | AZ | 62 | (24) |
| Total | | 521 | (250) |

International career
| 1986–1997 | Netherlands | 30 | (17) |
Medal record
Representing Netherlands
UEFA European Championship
| Winner | 1988 West Germany |
- * Club domestic league appearances and goals

Johannes "John" Jacobus Bosman (born 1 February 1965) is a Dutch former professional footballer who played as a forward.

A prolific goalscorer for both club and country, he played professionally for 19 years, most notably with Ajax (five seasons) and Anderlecht (five), surpassing the 100-goal mark with both clubs and winning a total of eight major titles combined.

Nicknamed Bossie, Bosman represented Netherlands at the 1994 World Cup and Euro 1988, helping the national team win the latter tournament.

== Club career ==
=== Ajax ===
Born in Bovenkerk, Amstelveen, Bosman began his professional career at Ajax, making his Eredivisie debut on 20 November 1983 at the age of 18 in a 5–2 home win against Roda JC, scoring in the match. He finished his first season with four goals in 14 games.

From 1984 to 1987, Bosman and fellow youth graduate Marco van Basten scored an astonishing 138 league goals combined (48 for Bosman), as the Amsterdam club won the 1985 national championship and two cups. After van Basten left for A.C. Milan in the 1987 summer, he netted 25 goals in 32 games as the team finished second to PSV Eindhoven; he also helped it to the season's UEFA Cup Winners' Cup final, a 1–0 loss to Mechelen – the previous year, as Ajax won the competition, he was crowned top scorer with eight goals.

=== Mechelen ===
Bosman signed for the Belgian club in the 1988 off-season, reuniting with former Ajax manager Aad de Mos. He scored twice against PSV, in a 3–0 home win in the first leg of the 1988 European Super Cup (eventual 3–1 aggregate success).

Additionally, Bosman netted in double digits in both of his seasons with the Yellow Reds, notably scoring 18 in his first as the team won the national championship after a 41-year wait.

=== Anderlecht ===
After one year back in his country with PSV Eindhoven, as successor to Wim Kieft who signed with a team in France – he served mainly as a target player for Romário, but felt uncomfortable in that role, and was also under threat of losing his starting position to youngster Twan Scheepers – Bosman returned to Belgium and joined Anderlecht, reuniting with former Mechelen teammates Graeme Rutjes and Bruno Versavel (and eventually de Mos) and being dubbed "The Giraffe".

In 1996, new manager Johan Boskamp relegated Bosman to the bench, but he was overall a solid contributor in the conquest of three consecutive leagues and the 1993–94 Belgian Cup, his worst league output being six goals in 1994–95.

=== Later years ===
Aged 31, Bosman returned to the Netherlands and signed for Twente, scoring 20 goals in his first season as the Enschede side finished third and qualified to the UEFA Cup, and being regularly used for the remainder of his spell.

He played a further three years with fellow league club AZ – also signing as a free agent – and finished his professional career at 37 with league totals of 522 games and 241 goals. He retired from football for good after a very brief spell with amateurs Amsterdam FC, later going on to work with Ajax as a striker coach.

== International career ==
Bosman played 30 times for the Netherlands, making his debut on 14 May 1986 in a 3–1 friendly loss in West Germany. He was selected by manager Rinus Michels for the UEFA Euro 1988 tournament, initially as starter and the top goal scorer during the qualification state, but lost his position after the 1–0 group stage loss against the Soviet Union, his position being taken by former Ajax teammate van Basten, who would be crowned the competition's top scorer as the national team emerged victorious.

Bosman was also picked for the squad that appeared at the 1994 FIFA World Cup in the United States, after Ruud Gullit refused to play for the national team in these World Cup, being an unused squad member.

=== Bomb incident ===
Bosman scored nine of his 17 international goals against the same opponent, Cyprus, in three different matches. In a Euro 1988 qualifier on 28 October 1987, in Rotterdam, a homemade bomb or firework exploded in the early stages of the contest close to Cypriot goalkeeper Andreas Charitou; Charitou was stretchered off and replaced, and the Cypriot players left the field in protest and refused to continue playing.

After much pressure from the Dutch side, Luxembourg referee Roger Philippi decided the game could continue. The match ended 8–0 with Bosman establishing a national-team record of five goals in one game, but it was never officially recognised, as UEFA decided that the match was invalid and Cyprus were awarded a 3–0 victory instead, giving Greece the opportunity to qualify; the Dutch made an appeal which carried the risk of exclusion, with Dr. Greep stating that Charitou was not actually injured, which resulted in a replay in Amsterdam.

On 9 December 1987, Netherlands won 4–0 and Bosman netted a hat-trick to see his team through to the final stages in West Germany. Greece were extremely unhappy with the decision, accusing UEFA's West German chairman of preferring a Dutch team in the finals, bringing a larger crowd of supporters to the stadia; after the protests, the Hellenic Football Federation decided to move the last group match to a small stadium in Rhodes and field a sub-standard team – Netherlands also won that game (3–0).

The bomb was hidden in a tennis ball. The thrower was 21-year-old John Staal from Oss, who was immediately arrested.

== Personal life ==
In October 2001, Bosman's five-year-old son Devin died in a traffic accident.

== Career statistics ==
=== Club ===
Appearances and goals by club, season and competition
| Club | Season | League | | | National cup | | Europe | | Other | | Total | |
| Club | Season | Division | Apps | Goals | Apps | Goals | Apps | Goals | Apps | Goals | Apps | Goals |
|---|---|---|---|---|---|---|---|---|---|---|---|---|
| Ajax | 1983–84 | Eredivisie | 14 | 4 | 0 | 0 | 0 | 0 | — | | 14 | 4 |
| Ajax | 1984–85 | Eredivisie | 23 | 6 | 0 | 0 | 4 (Note: Appearances in UEFA Cup) | 3 | — | | 27 | 9 |
| Ajax | 1985–86 | Eredivisie | 23 | 19 | 0 | 0 | 0 | 0 | — | | 23 | 19 |
| Ajax | 1986–87 | Eredivisie | 33 | 23 | 4 | 4 | 7 (Note: Appearances in European Cup Winners' Cup) | 8 | — | | 44 | 35 |
| Ajax | 1987–88 | Eredivisie | 32 | 25 | 1 | 0 | 9 | 1 | 1 (Note: Appearance in UEFA Super Cup) | 0 | 43 | 26 |
| Ajax | Total | | 125 | 77 | 5 | 4 | 20 | 12 | 1 | 0 | 151 | 93 |
| Mechelen | 1988–89 | Belgian First Division | 30 | 18 | | | 7 | 3 | — | | 37 | 21 |
| Mechelen | 1989–90 | Belgian First Division | 31 | 16 | | | 6 (Note: Appearances in European Cup) | 3 | — | | 37 | 19 |
| Mechelen | Total | | 61 | 34 | | | 13 | 6 | — | | 74 | 40 |
| PSV | 1990–91 | Eredivisie | 30 | 11 | 4 | 3 | 2 | 0 | — | | 36 | 14 |
| Anderlecht | 1991–92 | Belgian First Division | 32 | 16 | | | 6 | 1 | — | | 38 | 17 |
| Anderlecht | 1992–93 | Belgian First Division | 30 | 13 | | | 1 | 1 | — | | 31 | 14 |
| Anderlecht | 1993–94 | Belgian First Division | 33 | 20 | | | 10 (Note: Appearances in UEFA Champions League) | 3 | — | | 43 | 23 |
| Anderlecht | 1994–95 | Belgian First Division | 31 | 6 | | | 6 | 1 | — | | 37 | 7 |
| Anderlecht | 1995–96 | Belgian First Division | 30 | 15 | | | 1 | 0 | — | | 31 | 15 |
| Anderlecht | Total | | 156 | 70 | | | 24 | 6 | — | | 180 | 76 |
| Twente | 1996–97 | Eredivisie | 33 | 20 | 4 | 7 | — | | — | | 37 | 27 |
| Twente | 1997–98 | Eredivisie | 24 | 6 | 5 | 2 | 4 | 0 | — | | 33 | 8 |
| Twente | 1998–99 | Eredivisie | 30 | 8 | 4 | 2 | 4 (Note: Appearances in UEFA Intertoto Cup) | 1 | — | | 38 | 11 |
| Twente | Total | | 87 | 34 | 13 | 11 | 8 | 1 | — | | 108 | 46 |
| AZ | 1999–2000 | Eredivisie | 31 | 18 | 6 | 3 | — | | — | | 37 | 21 |
| AZ | 2000–01 | Eredivisie | 21 | 4 | 4 | 2 | — | | — | | 25 | 6 |
| AZ | 2001–02 | Eredivisie | 10 | 2 | 2 | 0 | — | | — | | 12 | 2 |
| AZ | Total | | 62 | 24 | 12 | 5 | — | | — | | 74 | 29 |
| Career total | | | 521 | 250 | 34 | 23 | 67 | 25 | 1 | 0 | 623 | 298 |

=== International ===
Appearances and goals by national team and year
| National team | Year | Apps | Goals |
|---|---|---|---|
| Netherlands | 1986 | 4 | 1 |
| Netherlands | 1987 | 5 | 8 |
| Netherlands | 1988 | 6 | 2 |
| Netherlands | 1989 | 5 | 2 |
| Netherlands | 1990 | 2 | 0 |
| Netherlands | 1991 | 0 | 0 |
| Netherlands | 1992 | 0 | 0 |
| Netherlands | 1993 | 3 | 3 |
| Netherlands | 1994 | 3 | 0 |
| Netherlands | 1995 | 0 | 0 |
| Netherlands | 1996 | 0 | 0 |
| Netherlands | 1997 | 2 | 1 |
| Total | | 30 | 17 |

Scores and results list The Netherlands' goal tally first, score column indicates score after each Bosman goal.

List of international goals scored by John Bosman
| No. | Date | Venue | Opponent | Score | Result | Competition |
|---|---|---|---|---|---|---|
| 1 | 21 December 1986 | Tsirion Stadium, Limassol, Cyprus | Cyprus | 2–0 | 2–2 | UEFA Euro 1988 qualifying |
| 2 | 28 October 1987 | De Kuip, Rotterdam, Netherlands | Cyprus | 1–0 | 8–0 | UEFA Euro 1988 qualifying |
| 3 | 28 October 1987 | De Kuip, Rotterdam, Netherlands | Cyprus | 3–0 | 8–0 | UEFA Euro 1988 qualifying |
| 4 | 28 October 1987 | De Kuip, Rotterdam, Netherlands | Cyprus | 6–0 | 8–0 | UEFA Euro 1988 qualifying |
| 5 | 28 October 1987 | De Kuip, Rotterdam, Netherlands | Cyprus | 7–0 | 8–0 | UEFA Euro 1988 qualifying |
| 6 | 28 October 1987 | De Kuip, Rotterdam, Netherlands | Cyprus | 8–0 | 8–0 | UEFA Euro 1988 qualifying |
| 7 | 9 December 1987 | De Meer, Amsterdam, Netherlands | Cyprus | 1–0 | 4–0 | UEFA Euro 1988 qualifying |
| 8 | 9 December 1987 | De Meer, Amsterdam, Netherlands | Cyprus | 2–0 | 4–0 | UEFA Euro 1988 qualifying |
| 9 | 9 December 1987 | De Meer, Amsterdam, Netherlands | Cyprus | 4–0 | 4–0 | UEFA Euro 1988 qualifying |
| 10 | 23 March 1988 | Wembley, London, England | England | 1–2 | 2–2 | Friendly |
| 11 | 1 June 1988 | Olympic Stadium, Amsterdam, Netherlands | Romania | 1–0 | 2–0 | Friendly |
| 12 | 11 October 1989 | Racecourse Ground, Wrexham, Wales | Wales | 2–0 | 2–1 | 1990 FIFA World Cup qualification |
| 13 | 15 November 1989 | De Kuip, Rotterdam, Netherlands | Finland | 1–0 | 3–0 | 1990 FIFA World Cup qualification |
| 14 | 22 September 1993 | Renato Dall'Ara, Bologna, Italy | San Marino | 1–0 | 7–0 | FIFA 1994 World Cup qualification |
| 15 | 22 September 1993 | Renato Dall'Ara, Bologna, Italy | San Marino | 5–0 | 7–0 | FIFA 1994 World Cup qualification |
| 16 | 22 September 1993 | Renato Dall'Ara, Bologna, Italy | San Marino | 6–0 | 7–0 | FIFA 1994 World Cup qualification |
| 17 | 30 April 1997 | San Marino Stadium, Serravalle, San Marino | San Marino | 5–0 | 6–0 | FIFA 1998 World Cup qualification |

== Honours ==
Ajax

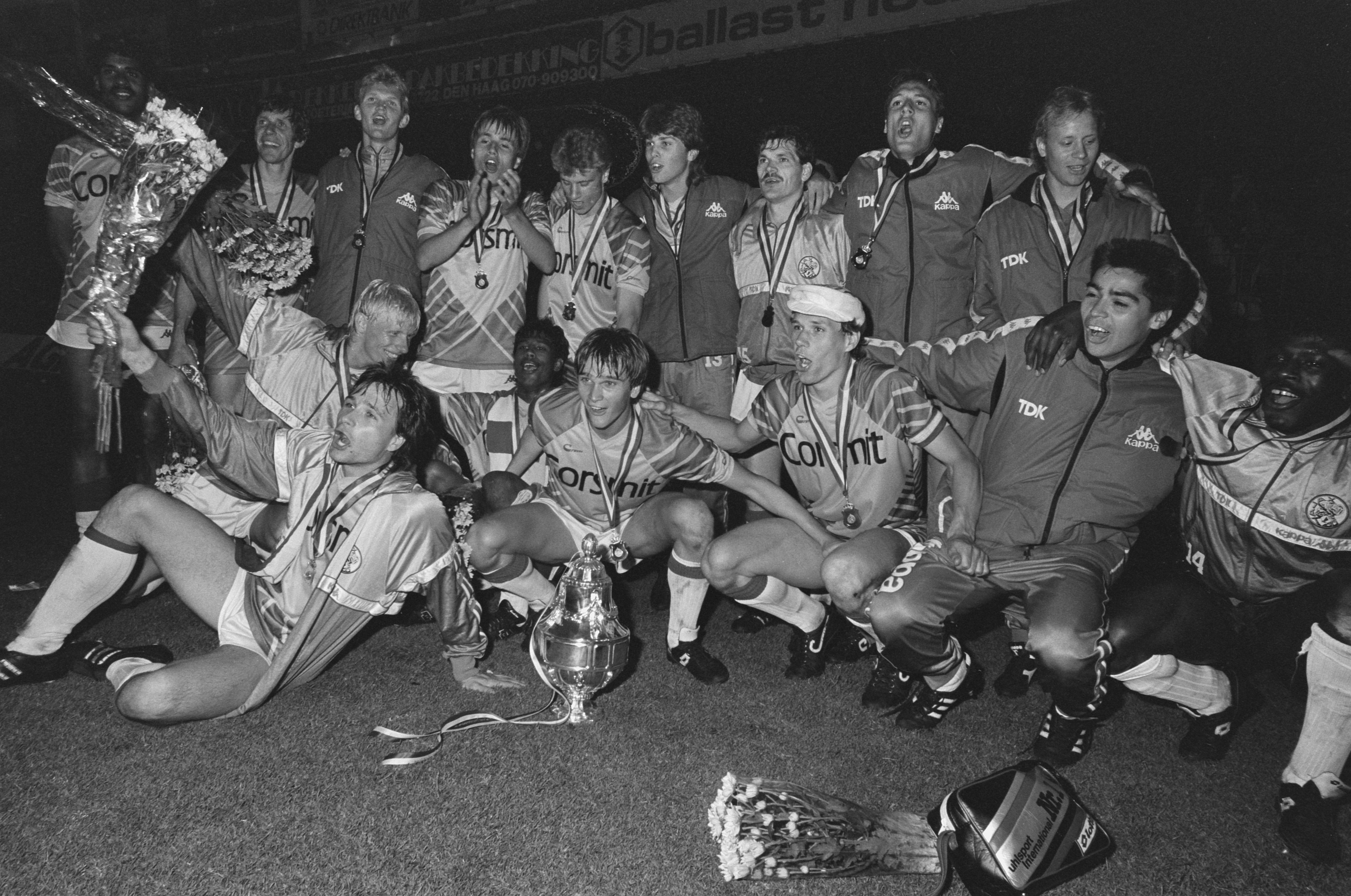
Bosman (above trophy) with Ajax teammates celebrating victory in the 1986–87 KNVB Cup.

- Eredivisie: 1984–85
- KNVB Cup: 1985–86, 1986–87
- UEFA Cup Winners' Cup: 1986–87; runner-up 1987–88

Mechelen

- Belgian First Division A: 1988–89
- UEFA Super Cup: 1988

PSV

- Eredivisie: 1990–91

Anderlecht

- Belgian First Division A: 1992–93, 1993–94, 1994–95
- Belgian Cup: 1993–94
- Belgian Super Cup: 1993, 1995

Netherlands

- UEFA European Championship: 1988

Individual

- UEFA Cup Winners' Cup: Top Scorer 1986–87 (eight goals)
