= Marc Emmers =

Belgian footballer (born 1966)

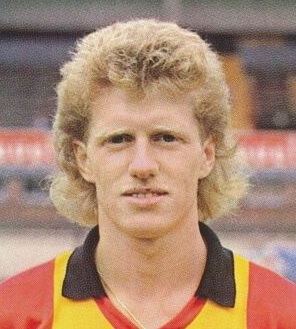
- Emmers for KV Mechelen in 1988

Personal information
- Full name: Marc Jozef Emmers
- Date of birth: 25 February 1966 (age 60)
- Place of birth: Hamont-Achel, Belgium
- Height: 1.81 m (5 ft 11 in)
- Position: Midfielder

Senior career*
Years	Team	Apps	(Gls)
1983–1987	Thor Waterschei	98	(14)
1987–1992	KV Mechelen	155	(33)
1992–1997	R.S.C. Anderlecht	60	(3)
1997	AC Perugia	7	(0)
1998–1999	AC Lugano	36	(3)
1999–2000	KFC Diest	9	(2)
Total		365	(55)

International career
1988–1994	Belgium	37	(2)
- * Club domestic league appearances and goals

Marc Jozef Emmers (born 25 February 1966 in Hamont-Achel) is a retired Belgian footballer.

His former clubs include KV Mechelen, R.S.C. Anderlecht and AC Lugano. With K.V. Mechelen, he won the Belgian Cup in 1987, the European Cup Winner's Cup and the European Super Cup in 1988 and the Belgian First Division title in 1989. After his transfer to R.S.C. Anderlecht in the mid-1990s, he won the Belgian First Division title three times from 1994 to 97.

Emmers was a versatile player who was mainly played out as a midfielder. Through his career, he played at the position of libero, defensive midfielder, attacking midfielder and right-back.

== International career ==
Emmers also played for Belgium and was in the squad for two World Cups. At the 1990 World Cup, he played all three group stage matches, and in 1994, he participated in another three games.

== Personal life ==
Emmers is the father of the Belgian footballer Xian Emmers.

== Honours ==
=== Player ===
KV Mechelen

- Belgian First Division: 1988–89
- Belgian Cup: 1990-91 (runners-up), 1991-92 (runners-up)
- European Cup Winners Cup: 1987–88 (winners)
- European Super Cup: 1988
- Amsterdam Tournament: 1989
- Joan Gamper Trophy: 1989
- Jules Pappaert Cup: 1990

==== Anderlecht ====
- Belgian First Division: 1992-93, 1993-94, 1994-95
- Belgian Cup: 1993-94 (winners), 1996-97 (runners-up)
- Belgian Super Cup: 1993

=== Individual ===
- Man of the Season (Belgian First Division): 1988-89
- Belgian Professional Footballer of the Year: 1988-89
