= Michel Preud'homme =

Belgian footballer (born 1959)

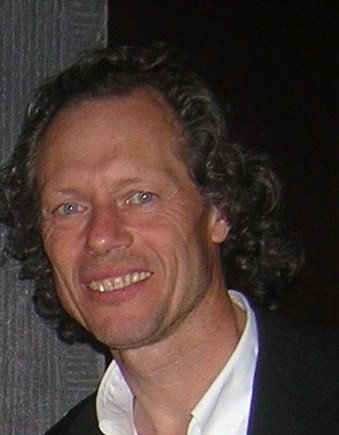
- Preud'homme in 2008

Personal information
- Full name: Michel Georges Jean Ghislain Preud'homme
- Date of birth: 24 January 1959 (age 67)
- Place of birth: Ougrée, Belgium
- Height: 1.83 m (6 ft 0 in)
- Position: Goalkeeper

Team information
- Current team: Standard Liège (vice-president & sports director)

Youth career
- 1969–1977: Standard Liège

Senior career*
Years	Team	Apps	(Gls)
1977–1986	Standard Liège	240	(0)
1986–1994	Mechelen	263	(0)
1994–1999	Benfica	147	(0)
Total		650	(0)

International career
1979–1994	Belgium	58	(0)

Managerial career
- 2001–2002: Standard Liège
- 2006–2008: Standard Liège
- 2008–2010: Gent
- 2010–2011: Twente
- 2011–2013: Al-Shabab
- 2013–2017: Club Brugge
- 2018–2020: Standard Liège
- * Club domestic league appearances and goals

Michel Georges Jean Ghislain Preud'homme (French pronunciation: [miʃɛl ʒɔʁʒ ʒɑ̃ ɡilɛ̃ pʁødɔm]; born 24 January 1959) is a Belgian retired footballer and manager who played as a goalkeeper. Currently, he is vice-president and sports director at Standard Liège.

He was considered one of the world's best and most consistent goalkeepers during his professional career; he was the first winner of the Yashin Award as the best goalkeeper at the 1994 FIFA World Cup.

At club level, Preud'homme played for Standard Liège, Mechelen and Benfica. With Mechelen, he won the Belgian Cup in 1987, the Cup Winner's Cup and the European Super Cup in 1988 and the Belgian league title in 1989. He also won the Portuguese Cup with Benfica in 1996. He retired as a player in 1999, aged 40. For Belgium, Preud'homme was capped 58 times, from 1979 to 1994. Other than the 1994 World Cup, he also played in the 1990 tournament.

== Club career ==
=== Standard Liège ===
Preud'homme is a product of Standard Liège's youth system, which he joined at 10 years old in 1969. He was first called up to the first team in 1977 and made his senior debut in August 1977 after early injuries to the main goalkeeper Christian Piot and his successor Jean-Paul Crucifix. With Standard Liège Preud'homme won the Belgian First Division in 1981–82 and 1982–83. He was also runner-up in the 1981–82 UEFA Cup Winners' Cup, losing against F.C. Barcelona.

=== KV Mechelen ===
Preud'homme was transferred to KV Mechelen in 1986. The following seasons would become the most successful for the player (as well for the club), winning the 1986-87 Belgian Cup, the 1987–88 European Cup Winners' Cup, the 1988 European Super Cup and the 1988–89 Belgian First Division. In June 1993, there were negotiations by Sporting CP to sign him, but the transfer never happened.

=== Benfica ===
Preud'homme moved to Portuguese club Benfica in 1994, making his debut on 21 August, against Beira-Mar. On 18 May 1996, Michel won his first trophy in Portuguese football as Benfica defeated Lisbon rivals Sporting CP 3–1 in the Taça de Portugal final.

For his outstanding performances and almost impossible saves, he was nicknamed "Saint Michel" by supporters of Benfica. On 10 August 1999, he played his last match, an off season friendly against Bayern Munich. After his retirement, at age 40, he became Benfica's director of international relations.

== International career ==
Preud'homme made his senior debut on 2 May 1979 in a 0–0 draw with Austria in a UEFA Euro 1980 qualifying match. He served as third keeper behind Jean-Marie Pfaff and Theo Custers in the UEFA Euro 1980 as Belgium lost in the final against West Germany.

Preud'homme represented Belgium in two consecutive FIFA World Cups: 1990 and 1994 – the latter being his last competition at international level, where he was awarded with the Yashin Award for best goalkeeper, and was included in the FIFA World Cup All-Star Team, as Belgium reached the round of 16 of the tournament, only to be eliminated by defending champions Germany following a 3–2 defeat.

Preud'homme made his final appearance for Belgium on 17 December 1994 in a 4–1 defeat to Spain, in a UEFA Euro 1996 qualifying match.

== Style of play ==
Regarded as one of the leading goalkeepers of his era, Preud'homme was known for his shot-stopping ability, reflexes, agility, command of the penalty area, and tendency to make important saves.

== Managerial career ==
After his professional football career, Michel Preud'homme stayed at Benfica to become technical director. In September 2000, he suggested the club approach José Mourinho to become the head coach.

=== Standard Liège ===
Preud'homme has been the head coach of Standard Liège twice, the first time from December 2000 to May 2002 and the second time from August 2006 to the end of the 2008 season. After leaving his technical director duties at Benfica, he replaced Tomislav Ivić on 20 December 2000. In May 2002, he left his coaching position to become Standard's sporting director.

On 30 August 2006, after Dutchman Johan Boskamp was sacked due to poor results, Preud'homme left his sporting director duties and became Standard's manager for the second time in his career. After his return to the club, Standard Liège won in 2008 its first Belgian Championship in 25 years, and it therefore came as a surprise when he was appointed manager of Gent for the 2008–09 season.

=== Gent ===
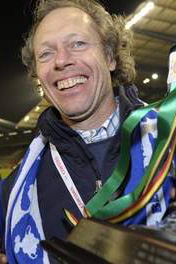
Michel Preud'homme after winning the Belgian cup with Gent in 2010

Preud'homme moved to Gent on 27 May 2008. With Gent he finished second in the Jupiler Pro League, this was their highest place ever (together with the 1954–55 season). He also won the Belgian Cup, it was the third time in the history of the club that they won that trophy.

=== Twente ===
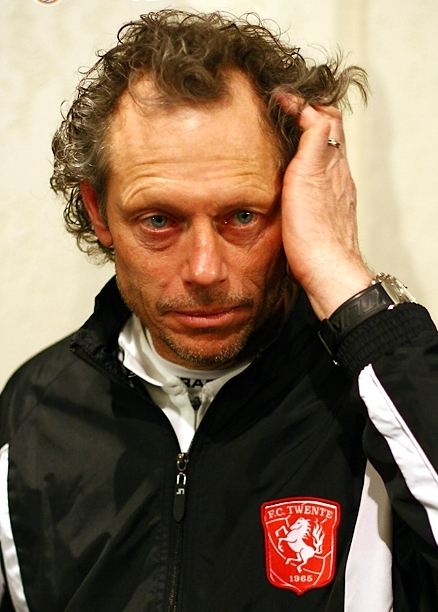
Preud'homme as coach of Twente in 2011

On 23 May 2010, it was confirmed that Preud'homme would replace Steve McClaren as the head coach of Twente, despite the interest of Porto and Milan. On 31 July 2010, he won his first trophy in Dutch football as Twente defeated Ajax 1–0 in the Johan Cruyff Shield match. In the last league match of the season, Twente lost to Ajax, which meant the Dutch title went to Amsterdam and Twente finished runners-up. On 8 May 2011, Twente defeated Ajax 3–2 after extra time in the KNVB Cup final held at the De Kuip in Rotterdam.

=== Al-Shabab Riyadh ===
On 13 June 2011, FC Twente confirmed Preud'homme's departure to Saudi Arabian club Al-Shabab Riyadh on its website. By the end of the transfer window, he brought Brazilian central midfielder Fernando Menegazzo and Uzbekistani midfielder Server Djeparov.

On 10 September 2011, Al-Shabab won 3–1 at Al-Faisaly in Preud'homme's first Saudi Professional League game as manager. On 10 March 2012, he succeeded Anderlecht coach Ariel Jacobs on winning the Guy Thys Award, the prize for the coach who most contributed to the image of his profession and football.

On 14 April 2012, after a 1–1 draw against Al-Ahli, Al-Shabab clinched the Saudi Professional League title after six years since they had won it for the last time. Shabab finishing the league undefeated, with 19 victories and 7 draws. At the end of the season, he was won the Saudi Arabia Manager of the Year award.

On 10 May, Preud'homme was rewarded with a new contract extension, running until 2016. On 18 September 2013, he and Al-Shabab agreed to part ways, allowing him to sign for Club Brugge one day later.

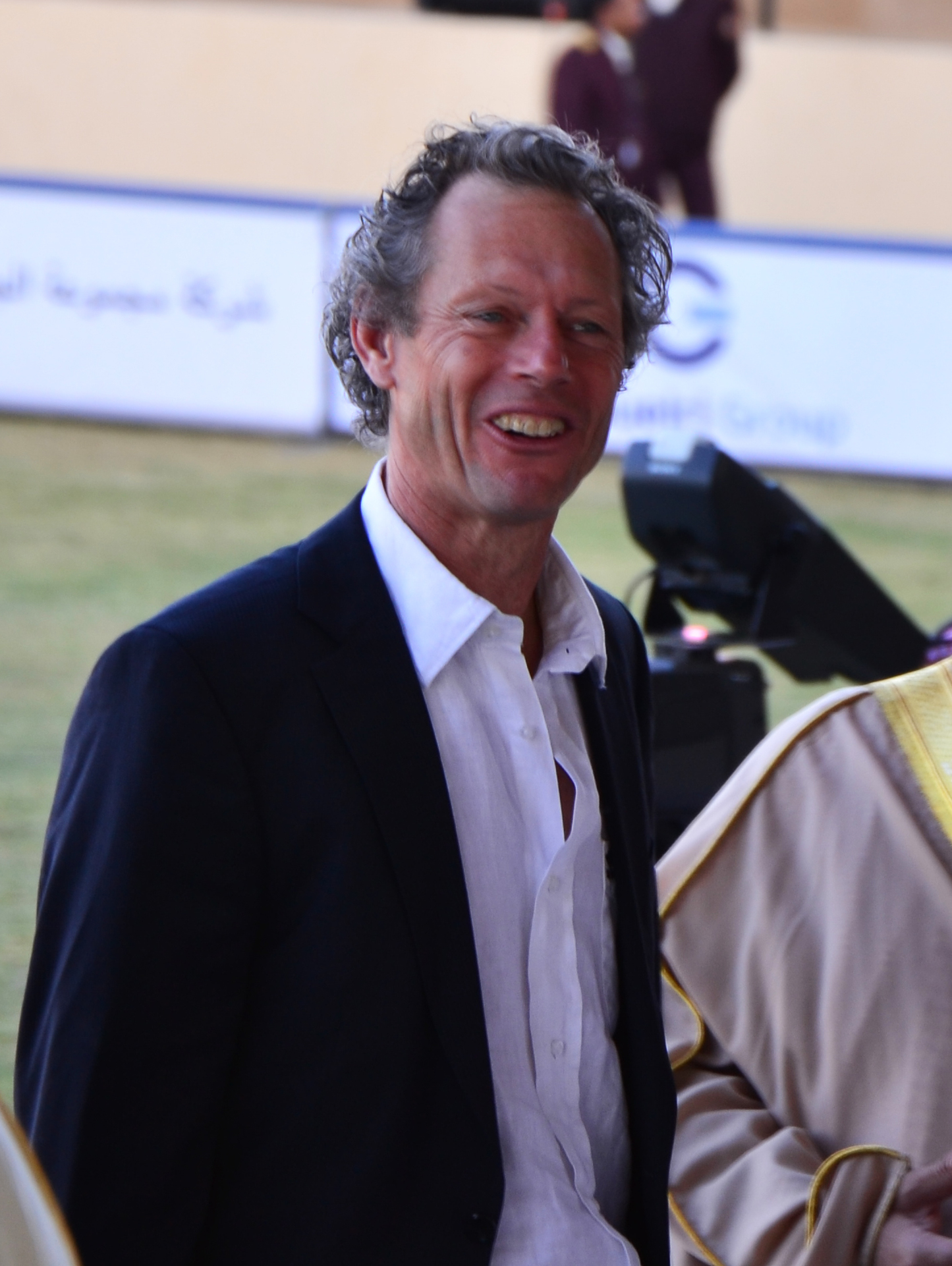
Preud'homme with Al Shabab in 2012

=== Club Brugge ===
After Juan Carlos Garrido was fired, Preud'homme was appointed head coach of Club Brugge on 19 September 2013. Six days later, he made his debut in a 1–0 win against Oudenaarde. At the end of the season, Preud'homme signed a new contract to remain as Club Brugge manager until 2019.

On 11 February 2015, Preud'homme reached his third Belgian Cup Final, after eliminating rivals Cercle Brugge 8–3 on aggregate. On 22 March 2015, he won that final against rivals Anderlecht. It was the first trophy for Club Brugge in eight years. At the end of the season, he was voted Belgian Professional Manager of the Year for the second time.

Preud'homme started the new season losing the 2015 Belgian Super Cup to Gent. In the Belgian Cup, Brugge won 0–2 in the quarter-final against Westerlo. On 3 February 2016, they eliminated Gent on the away goals rule to reach the Cup Final for the second year in a row. Brugge lost the match 2–1 to Standard Liège.

On 15 May 2016, after finishing first in the regular season, Preud'homme won the Jupiler Pro League with Club Brugge in a 4–0 win over Anderlecht. It took the club 11 years since their last victory in the Belgian competition. On 23 May, he was voted Manager of the Year for the third time, the second consecutive.

=== Return to Standard Liège ===
On 23 May 2018, Preud'homme signed with Standard Liège. Two years after returning to Standard, Preud'homme announced on June 8, 2020, that he was stepping down as coach and sporting director. He did, however, continue as vice-chairman of Standard. Just under a year later, he stepped down from this position as well.

=== Contact with RBFA ===
For years, Preud'homme—just like his former teammate Eric Gerets—was mentioned as a potential national team coach, but neither of them would ever end up taking the job. In 2023, the Belgian Football Association approached Preud'homme to become national team coach or technical director. He declined both jobs and stated that he preferred not to return to the football world because it demanded too much of him mentally and physically to be able to perform at 100 percent.

== Career statistics ==
=== Club ===
Appearances and goals by club, season and competition
Club	Season	League			National cup (Note: Includes Belgian Cup, Taça de Portugal)		Europe		Other		Total	
Club	Season	Division	Apps	Goals	Apps	Goals	Apps	Goals	Apps	Goals	Apps	Goals
Standard Liège	1977–78	First Division	32	0	4	0	5 (Note: Appearances in UEFA Cup)	0	0 (Note: Appearances in UEFA Intertoto Cup)	0	41	0
Standard Liège	1978–79	First Division	34	0	3	0	4	0	0	0	41	0
Standard Liège	1979–80	First Division	33	0	7	0	6	0	4	0	50	0
Standard Liège	1980–81	First Division	34	0	6	0	8	0	6	0	54	0
Standard Liège	1981–82	First Division	33	0	0	0	9 (Note: Appearances in UEFA Cup Winners' Cup)	0	1	0	43	0
Standard Liège	1982–83	First Division	34	0	1	0	4 (Note: Appearances in European Cup)	0	1	0	40	0
Standard Liège	1983–84	First Division	27	0	5	0	4	0	3 (Note: 2 appearances in UEFA Intertoto Cup, 1 in Belgian Super Cup)	0	39	0
Standard Liège	1984–85	First Division	5	0	1	0	—		0	0	6	0
Standard Liège	1985–86	First Division	7	0	2	0	—		4 (Note: Appearances in Belgian League Cup)	0	13	0
Standard Liège	Total		239	0	29	0	40	0	19	0	327	0
Mechelen	1986–87	First Division	34	0	9	0	—		—		43	0
Mechelen	1987–88	First Division	30	0	7	0	9	0	—		46	0
Mechelen	1988–89	First Division	34	0	8	0	8	0	2 (Note: Appearances in UEFA Super Cup)	0	52	0
Mechelen	1989–90	First Division	34	0	2	0	6	0	—		42	0
Mechelen	1990–91	First Division	34	0	7	0	2	0	—		43	0
Mechelen	1991–92	First Division	34	0	7	0	2	0	—		43	0
Mechelen	1992–93	First Division	33	0	2	0	4	0	—		39	0
Mechelen	1993–94	First Division	30	0	1	0	6	0	—		37	0
Mechelen	Total		263	0	43	0	37	0	2	0	345	0
Benfica	1994–95	Primeira Divisão	31	0	—		8 (Note: Appearances in UEFA Champions League)	0	1 (Note: Appearances in Supertaça)	0	40	0
Benfica	1995–96	Primeira Divisão	33	0	5	0	5	0	2	0	45	0
Benfica	1996–97	Primeira Divisão	34	0	5	0	6	0	—		45	0
Benfica	1997–98	Primeira Divisão	28	0	4	0	1	0	2	0	35	0
Benfica	1998–99	Primeira Divisão	21	0	—		4	0	2 (Note: Appearances in UEFA Champions League qualification)	0	27	0
Benfica	Total		147	0	14	0	24	0	7	0	192	0
Career total			649	0	86	0	101	0	28	0	864	0

=== International ===
National Team	Year	Friendlies		World Cup		European Championships		Total	
National Team	Year	Pld	GA	Pld	GA	Pld	GA	Pld	GA
Belgium	1979	0	0	0	0	1	0	1	0
Belgium	1981	0	0	2	3	0	0	2	3
Belgium	1987	0	0	0	0	2	2	2	2
Belgium	1988	4	7	1	0	0	0	5	7
Belgium	1989	2	0	6	5	0	0	8	5
Belgium	1990	6	7	4	4	1	3	11	14
Belgium	1991	2	0	0	0	5	3	7	3
Belgium	1992	2	5	5	1	0	0	7	6
Belgium	1993	1	1	4	4	0	0	5	5
Belgium	1994	3	2	4	4	3	5	10	11
Total		20	22	26	21	12	13	58	56

== Managerial statistics ==
As of match played 7 March 2020

Managerial record by team and tenure
Team	Nat	From	To	Record				
Team	Nat	From	To	G	W	D	L	Win %
Standard Liège	(Belgium)	25 December 2000	10 May 2002	57	24	21	12	42.11
Standard Liège	(Belgium)	31 August 2006	26 May 2008	229	117	59	53	51.09
Gent	(Belgium)	1 July 2008	30 June 2010	89	46	20	23	51.69
Twente	(Netherlands)	1 July 2010	30 June 2011	53	29	14	10	54.72
Al-Shabab	(Saudi Arabia)	13 June 2011	18 September 2013	75	48	15	12	64.00
Club Brugge	(Belgium)	19 September 2013	22 May 2017	204	117	33	54	57.35
Total				649	356	141	152	54.85

== Honours ==
=== Player ===
Standard Liège

- Belgian First Division: 1981–82, 1982–83
- Belgian Cup: 1980–81
- Belgian Supercup: 1981, 1983
- European Cup Winners Cup runner-up: 1981–82
- Intertoto Cup Group Winners: 1980, 1982, 1984

KV Mechelen

- Belgian First Division: 1988–89
- Belgian Cup: 1986–87
- European Cup Winners Cup: 1987–88
- European Super Cup: 1988

Benfica

- Taça de Portugal: 1995–96

Belgium

- UEFA European Championship runner-up: 1980
- Belgian Sports Merit Award: 1980

=== Manager ===
Standard Liège

- Belgian Pro League: 2007–08

Gent

- Belgian Cup: 2009–10

Twente

- KNVB Cup: 2010–11
- Johan Cruyff Shield: 2010

Al-Shabab

- Saudi Professional League: 2011–12

Club Brugge

- Belgian Pro League: 2015–16
- Belgian Cup: 2014–15
- Belgian Super Cup: 2016

=== Individual ===
Player

- Belgian Golden Shoe: 1987, 1989
- Belgian Goalkeeper of the Year: 1988, 1989, 1990, 1991
- Ballon d'Or nominations: 1988, 1989, 1994
- Belgian Sports Merit Award: 1989
- Belgian Fair Play Award: 1989
- FIFA World Cup Yashin Award: 1994
- FIFA World Cup All-Star Team: 1994
- Best European Goalkeeper of the Year: 1994
- IFFHS World's Best Goalkeeper of the Year: 1994
- Belgian Golden Shoe of the 20th Century (5th): 1995
- IFFHS European Keeper of the Century (19th): 2000
- The Best Golden Shoe Team Ever: 2011
- Bleacher Report 50 Greatest Goalkeepers in Football History (6th): 2013
- DH The Best Standard Liège Team Ever: 2020
- RBFA 125 Years Icons Team: 2020
- Pro League Hall of Fame: 2024
- Belgian Golden Shoe Hall of Fame: 2025

Manager

- Belgian Professional Manager of the Year: 2007–08, 2014–15, 2015–16
- Rinus Michels Award: Manager of the Year 2011
- Guy Thys Award: 2012
- Saudi Arabia Manager of the Year: 2012
- Best Football Coach of the Year: 2016
- Raymond Goethals Trophy: 2025
