= Clijsters (surname) =

Clijsters is a surname. Notable people with the surname include:

- Jos Clijsters (born 1950), Belgian banker and chief executive
- Lei Clijsters (1956–2009), Belgian football player
- Johan Clijsters (1962–2005), Belgian artist and poet
- Kim Clijsters (born 1983), Belgian tennis player and oldest daughter of Lei Clijsters
- Elke Clijsters (born 1985), Belgian tennis player and youngest daughter of Lei Clijsters
