= Graeme Rutjes =

Dutch footballer

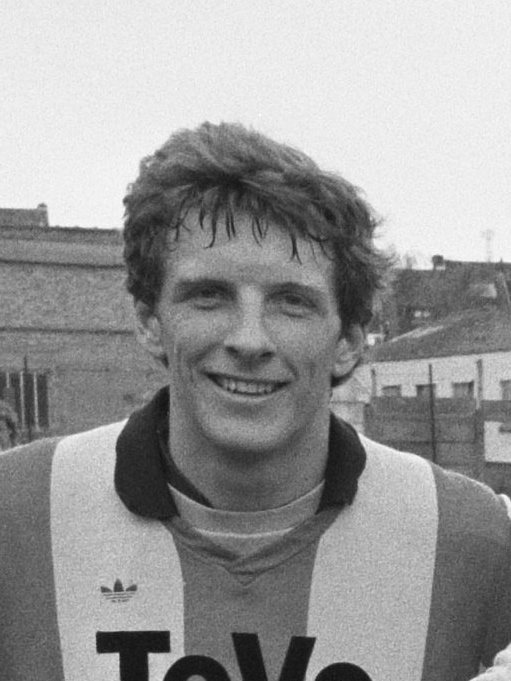
- Rutjes with Mechelen in 1988

Personal information
- Full name: Graeme Wayne Rutjes
- Date of birth: 26 March 1960 (age 66)
- Place of birth: Sydney, Australia
- Height: 1.86 m (6 ft 1 in)
- Position: Defender

Senior career*
Years	Team	Apps	(Gls)
1980–1985	Excelsior	149	(19)
1985–1990	K.V. Mechelen	153	(10)
1990–1996	Anderlecht	152	(5)
Total		454	(34)

International career
1989–1991	Netherlands	13	(1)
- * Club domestic league appearances and goals

Graeme Wayne Rutjes (born 26 March 1960) is a former footballer, who played as a defender for Excelsior Rotterdam (1980–85), Y.R. K.V. Mechelen (1985–90) and R.S.C. Anderlecht (1990–96). Born in Australia, he played 13 matches and scored 1 goal for the Netherlands national football team from 1989 to 1991, and was a member of the Dutch team at the 1990 FIFA World Cup.

== Career statistics ==
=== International ===
Appearances and goals by national team and year
National team	Year	Apps	Goals
Netherlands	1989	5	1
Netherlands	1990	6	0
Netherlands	1991	2	0
Total		13	1

Scores and results list the Netherlands' goal tally first, score column indicates score after each Rutjes goal.

List of international goals scored by Graeme Rutjes
No.	Date	Venue	Opponent	Score	Result	Competition
1	11 October 1989	Racecourse Ground, Wrexham, Wales	Wales	1–0	2–1	1990 FIFA World Cup qualification

== Honours ==
=== Player ===
KV Mechelen

- Belgian First Division: 1988–89
- Belgian Cup: 1986–87 (winners), 1990–91 (runners-up), 1991–92 (runners-up)
- European Cup Winners Cup: 1987–88 (winners)
- European Super Cup: 1988
- Amsterdam Tournament: 1989
- Joan Gamper Trophy: 1989
- Jules Pappaert Cup: 1990

RSC Anderlecht

- Belgian First Division: 1990–91, 1992–93, 1993–94, 1994–95
- Belgian Cup: 1993–94
- Belgian Super Cup: 1993, 1995
