= 1990 FIFA World Cup qualification – UEFA Group 4 =

The 1990 FIFA World Cup qualification UEFA Group 4 was a UEFA qualifying group for the 1990 FIFA World Cup. The group comprised Finland, European champions the Netherlands, Wales and West Germany.

The group was won by the Netherlands, who qualified for the 1990 FIFA World Cup. West Germany also qualified as one of the best runners-up.

== Standings ==
| Pos | Team | Pld | W | D | L | GF | GA | GD | Pts | Qualification | Netherlands national football team | Germany national football team | Finland national football team | Wales national football team |
|---|---|---|---|---|---|---|---|---|---|---|---|---|---|---|
| 1 | Netherlands | 6 | 4 | 2 | 0 | 8 | 2 | +6 | 10 | Qualification to 1990 FIFA World Cup | — | 1–1 | 3–0 | 1–0 |
| 2 | West Germany | 6 | 3 | 3 | 0 | 13 | 3 | +10 | 9 | Qualification to 1990 FIFA World Cup | 0–0 | — | 6–1 | 2–1 |
| 3 | Finland | 6 | 1 | 1 | 4 | 4 | 16 | −12 | 3 | | 0–1 | 0–4 | — | 1–0 |
| 4 | Wales | 6 | 0 | 2 | 4 | 4 | 8 | −4 | 2 | | 1–2 | 0–0 | 2–2 | — |

== Results ==
31 August 1988

| Finland | 0–4 | West Germany |
|---|---|---|
| | (Report) | Völler 7', 15'; Matthäus 52'; Riedle 87' |

Olympic Stadium, Helsinki
Attendance: 31,693
Referee: Vadim Zhuk (Soviet Union)

14 September 1988

| Netherlands | 1–0 | Wales |
|---|---|---|
| Gullit 82' | (Report) |

Olympic Stadium, Amsterdam
Attendance: 55,000
Referee: Jan Damgaard (Denmark)

19 October 1988

| Wales | 2–2 | Finland |
|---|---|---|
| Saunders 16' (pen.); Lahtinen 40' (o.g.) | (Report) | Ukkonen 9'; Paatelainen 44' |

Vetch Field, Swansea
Attendance: 9,603
Referee: Gudmundor Haraldsson (Iceland)
19 October 1988

| West Germany | 0–0 | Netherlands |
|---|---|---|
| | (Report) |

Olympic Stadium, Munich
Attendance: 73,000
Referee: Pietro D'Elia (Italy)

26 April 1989

| Netherlands | 1–1 | West Germany |
|---|---|---|
| Van Basten 87' | (Report) | Riedle 68' |

De Kuip, Rotterdam
Attendance: 50,500
Referee: Erik Fredriksson (Sweden)

31 May 1989

| Wales | 0–0 | West Germany |
|---|---|---|
| | (Report) |

Cardiff Arms Park, Cardiff
Attendance: 30,000
Referee: Carlos Silva Valente (Portugal)
31 May 1989

| Finland | 0–1 | Netherlands |
|---|---|---|
| | (Report) | Kieft 87' |

Olympic Stadium, Helsinki
Attendance: 46,217
Referee: Piotr Werner (Poland)

6 September 1989

| Finland | 1–0 | Wales |
|---|---|---|
| Lipponen 50' | (Report) |

Olympic Stadium, Helsinki
Attendance: 7,480
Referee: Siegfried Kirschen (East Germany)

4 October 1989

| West Germany | 6–1 | Finland |
|---|---|---|
| Möller 12', 80'; Littbarski 47'; Klinsmann 53'; Völler 62'; Matthäus 84' (pen.) | (Report) | Lipponen 72' |

Westfalenstadion, Dortmund
Attendance: 40,000
Referee: Alan Snoddy (Northern Ireland)

11 October 1989

| Wales | 1–2 | Netherlands |
|---|---|---|
| Bowen 89' | (Report) | Rutjes 13'; Bosman 79' |

Racecourse Ground, Wrexham
Attendance: 9,025
Referee: Helmut Kohl (Austria)

15 November 1989

| Netherlands | 3–0 | Finland |
|---|---|---|
| Bosman 57'; E. Koeman 62'; R. Koeman 69' (pen.) | (Report) |

De Kuip, Rotterdam
Attendance: 49,500
Referee: Egil Nervik (Norway)
15 November 1989

| West Germany | 2–1 | Wales |
|---|---|---|
| Völler 25'; Häßler 48' | (Report) | Allen 11' |

Müngersdorfer Stadion, Cologne
Attendance: 60,300
Referee: Michel Vautrot (France)

== Goalscorers ==
There were 29 goals scored during the 12 games, an average of 2.42 goals per game.

4 goals

- (West Germany) Rudi Völler

2 goals

- (Finland) Mika Lipponen
- (Netherlands) John Bosman
- (West Germany) Lothar Matthäus
- (West Germany) Andreas Möller
- (West Germany) Karl-Heinz Riedle

1 goal

- (Finland) Mixu Paatelainen
- (Finland) Kari Ukkonen
- (Netherlands) Ruud Gullit
- (Netherlands) Wim Kieft
- (Netherlands) Erwin Koeman
- (Netherlands) Ronald Koeman
- (Netherlands) Graeme Rutjes
- (Netherlands) Marco van Basten
- (Wales) Malcolm Allen
- (Wales) Mark Bowen
- (Wales) Dean Saunders
- (West Germany) Thomas Häßler
- (West Germany) Jürgen Klinsmann
- (West Germany) Pierre Littbarski

== See also ==
- Germany–Netherlands football rivalry
