= Andreas Charitou =

Cypriot footballer (born 1961)

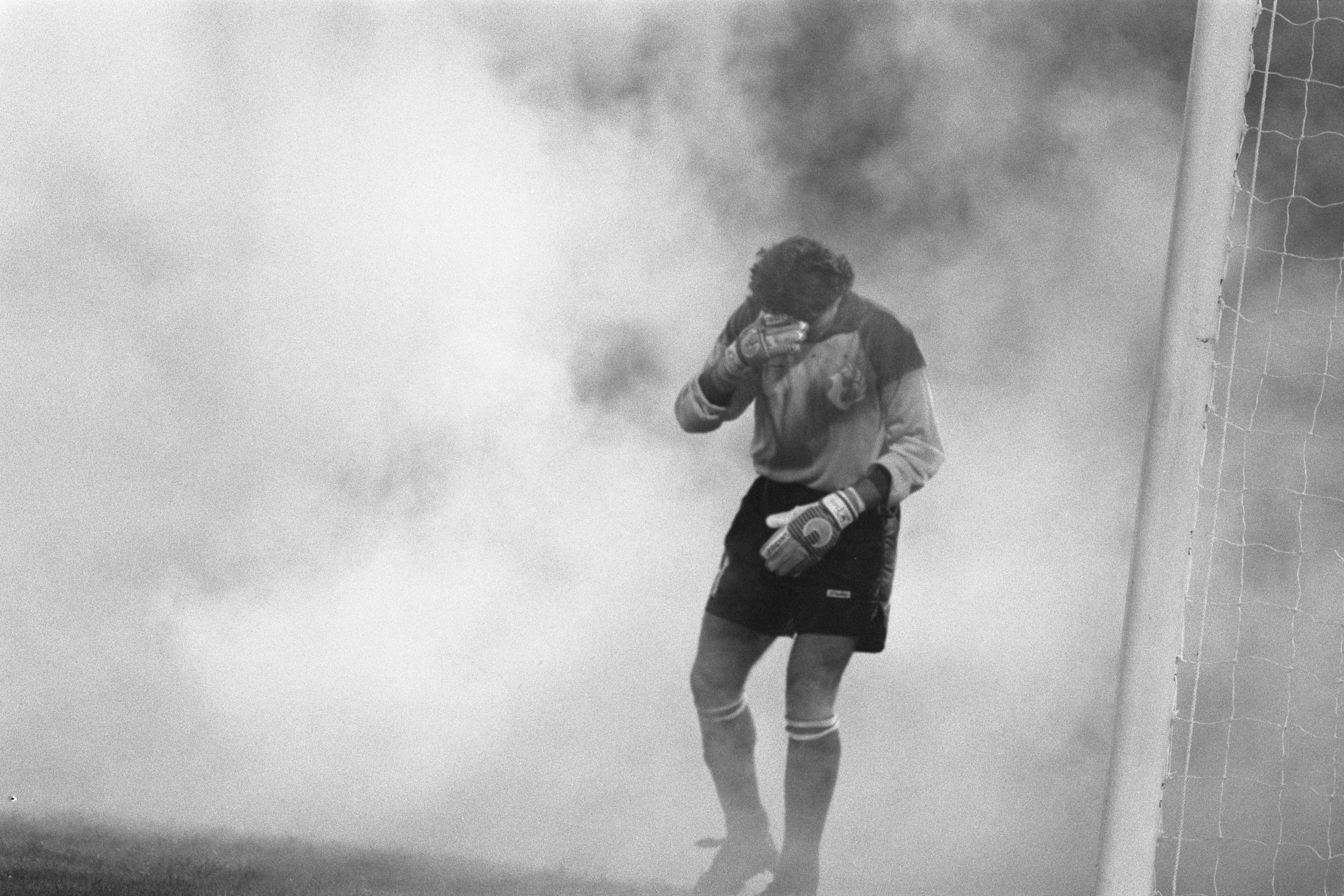

Personal information
- Full name: Andreas Charitou
- Date of birth: 29 December 1961 (age 64)
- Place of birth: Lythrodontas, Nicosia
- Position: Goalkeeper

Youth career
- Elia Lythrodonta

Senior career*
| Years | Team | Apps | (Gls) |
| 1979–1981 | Adonis Idaliou | | |
| 1981–1999 | Omonia | 369 | (0) |

International career
| 1984–1991 | Cyprus | 16 | (0) |

Managerial career
- 2000–2007: Omonia (goalkeeping coach)
- * Club domestic league appearances and goals

Andreas Charitou (Greek: Ανδρέας Χαρίτου, born 29 December 1961) is a Cypriot retired football goalkeeper who played the majority of his career for Omonia Nicosia.

== International career ==
Charitou made his debut for Cyprus in a September 1984 friendly match against Greece and earned a total of 15 caps. His final international was a November 1991 Euro Championship qualifier against the Soviet Union.

=== De Kuip bomb incident ===
In a Euro 1988 qualifier on 28 October 1987, in Rotterdam, a homemade bomb made of fireworks in a tennisball exploded close to Charitou in the early stages of the game. He was subsequently stretchered off and replaced, and the Cypriot players left the field in protest and refused to continue playing.

After much pressure from the Dutch team, Luxembourg referee Roger Philippi decided the game could continue. The match ended 8–0 with John Bosman establishing a Netherlands national team record of five goals in one game, but UEFA decided that the match was invalid and Cyprus were awarded a 0–3 victory instead, giving Greece the opportunity to qualify; the Dutch successfully appealed, with Dr. Greep stating that Charitou was not actually injured, which resulted in a replay in Amsterdam. Holland duly qualified and won the 1988 Euro Championships.

== Honours ==
=== Club ===
- AC Omonia
  - Cypriot Championship (7): 1981–82, 1982–83, 1983–84, 1984–85, 1986–87, 1988–89, 1992–93
  - Cypriot Cup (5): 1981–82, 1982–83, 1987–88, 1990–91, 1993–94
  - Stylianakis Shield (7): 1981, 1982, 1983, 1987, 1988, 1989, 1991

=== Individual ===
- CFA Moral Footballer of the Year (1): 1987
- 1998 Fair Play Ambassador of Cyprus Sports Organization
