= Aad de Mos =

Dutch football manager (born 1947)

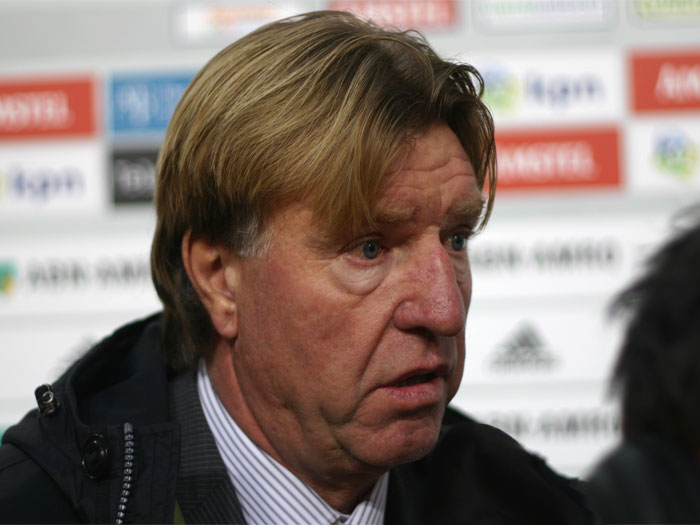
- De Mos in 2008

Personal information
- Full name: Adriaan de Mos
- Date of birth: 27 March 1947 (age 79)
- Place of birth: The Hague, Netherlands

Youth career
- Years: Team
- 1955: ADO Den Haag

Managerial career
- 1981: Ajax (caretaker)
- 1982–1985: Ajax
- 1986–1989: Mechelen
- 1989–1992: Anderlecht
- 1993–1994: PSV Eindhoven
- 1995–1996: Werder Bremen
- 1997–1998: Standard Liège
- 1998–1999: Sporting Gijón
- 1999: Urawa Red Diamonds
- 2000–2002: Mechelen
- 2003–2004: Al Hilal
- 2004–2005: United Arab Emirates
- 2006–2008: Vitesse
- 2009–2010: Kavala
- 2010: Sparta Rotterdam

Adriaan "Aad" de Mos (born 27 March 1947) is a Dutch retired professional football manager whose career spanned for almost thirty years.

He has managed teams in his home country, Belgium, Germany, Spain, Japan, Saudi Arabia and Greece, as well managing the United Arab Emirates national team. De Mos's biggest success was winning the 1987–88 European Cup Winners' Cup as manager of Belgian club Mechelen.

== Managerial career ==
=== Early career ===
De Mos was born in The Hague, Netherlands on 27 March 1947. He played in the youth team of local club ADO Den Haag in 1955. he began his managing as an assistant to Leo Beenhakker at Ajax, and continued to do so while Kurt Linder was manager.

After Linder left, de Mos replaced him as Ajax manager in 1982, and retained the role until he was dismissed shortly before the end of the 1984–1985 season. With Ajax de Mos won the national championship twice and the cup once.

=== Successes in Belgium ===
After leaving Ajax, de Mos became coach of Mechelen in Belgium. There he won the national title, cup and, in 1988, the European Cup Winners' Cup, beating his former club Ajax 1–0 in the final. He also won the 1988 European Super Cup with the club.

De Mos left Mechelen after three years to become Anderlecht manager, where he again reached the 1990 European Cup Winners' Cup Final, this time losing to Sampdoria in Gothenburg.

=== PSV ===
In 1993, after his successful stints with Mechelen and Anderlecht, de Mos came back to the Netherlands and became the new manager of PSV Eindhoven, faced with the task of cleaning up an aging team. In his first season, PSV placed third in the league.

In his second season, despite some major purchases, PSV and de Mos did not perform well. In September 1994, he positioned the centre forward Erik Meijer, known for being able to make good headers, for incomprehensible reasons as a back against Bayer 04 Leverkusen.

=== Career decline ===
After leaving PSV, de Mos managed 6 clubs and one national team in the span of 10 years, not winning any major trophies. In that period, he managed Werder Bremen, Standard Liège, Sporting Gijón, Urawa Red Diamonds, Mechelen once again, Al Hilal and the United Arab Emirates national team. During that time, de Mos was only able to win the Belgian Second Division with Mechelen in the 2001–02 and promote the club back up to the Belgian First Division A.

=== Vitesse ===
De Mos ultimately ended up in Arnhem on the bench at Vitesse in 2006. He was signed at the last moment after the club failed to attract the Dutch manager Johan Boskamp, largely because Boskamp did not have the correct Dutch papers and no dispensation was given by the KNVB.

After a disappointing first season, Vitesse ended in 12th and in the subsequent play-offs they fought for a place in the UEFA Intertoto Cup. After successful matches against NAC Breda (3–2 and 0–1 wins) and NEC (1–0 and 0–2 wins), they lost in the final against Utrecht on away goals. The 2007–08 season began with some success. The team won their first three matches, which was the best start to a season in the club's history, however the season again ended in failure, finishing in 12th place again. On 28 April 2008, the club management announced that the contract with de Mos was dissolved immediately.

=== Work as a pundit ===
De Mos was regularly shown on television as a pundit on the former Talpa TV and the Belgian Sporza. During the 2006 FIFA World Cup in Germany, de Mos was as an analyst for the NOS and the Belgian VIER.

=== Kavala ===
De Mos signed a six-month contract with Greek club Kavala, with an option to extend it up to January 2010, following the sacking of Vangelis Goutis. Shortly after, he was followed by the signings of Denilson, Ebi Smolarek and Diogo Rincón during the winter transfer period. He found immediate success, most notably with an away win against Panathinaikos in February, with the Athens club leading the league table at the time.

His notable results in Greece, despite his short stay at the club, coupled with his trademark managerial style, led popular Dutch magazine Voetbal International to give him the nickname of "Koning van Kavala" (King of Kavala). On 2 April 2010, de Mos resigned from his position as manager, allegedly after disputes with the club owner.

=== Sparta Rotterdam ===
On 2 April 2010, only one day after his resignation from Kavala, de Mos was named new manager of Sparta Rotterdam, replacing dismissed boss Frans Adelaar. He arrived at a time when the club was facing relegation with only a one-point advantage over 16th-placed ADO Den Haag. His adventure at Sparta started with little success: a 1–1 home draw to Heracles Almelo was followed by two consecutive losses, with his side being overtaken by ADO Den Haag, forcing the Rotterdam team to take part to the post-season promotion and relegation tournament in order to maintain its place in the Eredivisie.

In the first leg of the relegation play-offs second round, Sparta were stunned by Eerste Divisie outsiders Helmond Sport, losing the game 2–1. Sparta then managed to get back from that loss by winning 2–0 in a dramatic return leg, thus ensuring them a place in the third and final round, in which they challenged crosstown rivals Excelsior in a two-legged derby for a place in the 2010–11 Eredivisie.

After the first leg ended 0–0 at Excelsior's home stadium, Sparta was eliminated in a dramatic return match, with Excelsior missing a penalty, and then Sparta scoring the 1–0 goal in injury time only to suffer an equaliser only seconds later. The game ended with a 1–1 draw, as Sparta was consequently relegated in the 2010–11 Eerste Divisie. De Mos left Sparta shortly after, stating that the results of Sparta did not match the wishes of both de Mos and Sparta's ownership at the time.

== Personal life ==
De Mos has a daughter, Tessa (born 1982) who is active as a FIFA-licensed football agent since 2005, and currently works on behalf of several Eredivisie players.

== Managerial statistics ==
Team	From	To	Record								Ref.
Team	From	To	P	W	D	L	GF	GA	GD	Win %	Ref.
(Netherlands) Ajax (caretaker)	11 March 1981	30 June 1981	18	13	3	2	41	19	+22	72.22	
(Netherlands) Ajax	1 July 1982	6 May 1985	121	82	23	16	353	147	+206	67.77	
(Belgium) Mechelen	1 February 1986	30 June 1989	167	105	38	24	286	126	+160	62.87	
(Belgium) Anderlecht	1 July 1989	30 June 1992	141	89	26	26	301	118	+183	63.12	
(Netherlands) PSV Eindhoven	1 July 1993	28 October 1994	50	24	14	12	95	62	+33	48.00	
(Germany) Werder Bremen	1 July 1995	9 January 1996	26	8	9	9	37	32	+5	30.77	
(Belgium) Standard Liège	1 July 1997	20 October 1997	13	4	5	4	17	16	+1	30.77	
(Spain) Sporting de Gijón	19 October 1998	12 January 1999	14	3	7	4	13	16	−3	21.43	
(Japan) Urawa Red Diamonds	1 July 1999	3 December 1999	17	6	1	10	20	28	−8	35.29	
(Saudi Arabia) Al Hilal	4 March 2003	14 March 2004	39	22	10	7	66	30	+36	56.41	
United Arab Emirates	9 June 2004	30 June 2005	19	5	7	7	23	24	−1	26.32	
(Netherlands) Vitesse	19 June 2006	28 April 2008	77	30	14	33	110	123	−13	38.96	
(Greece) Kavala	1 February 2010	1 April 2010	12	5	4	3	17	17	+0	41.67	
(Netherlands) Sparta Rotterdam	4 April 2010	18 May 2010	8	1	3	4	6	13	−7	12.50	
Total			722	397	164	161	1,385	774	+611	54.99	

== Honours ==
=== Manager ===
Ajax

- Eredivisie: 1982–83, 1984–85
- KNVB Cup: 1982–83

Mechelen

- Belgian First Division: 1988–89
- Belgian Cup: 1986–87
- Belgian Second Division: 2001–02
- European Cup Winners Cup: 1987–88
- European Super Cup: 1988

Anderlecht

- Belgian First Division: 1990–91
- European Cup Winners Cup runner-up: 1989–90

=== Individual ===
- Belgian professional Manager of the Year: 1986–87, 1988–89
