= Willy Reynders =

Belgian football manager

Personal information
- Date of birth: 16 April 1954 (age 72)

Managerial career
- Years: Team
- 1995–1996: KV Mechelen
- 1997–1999: Lokeren
- 1999–2001: Sint-Truiden
- 2004–2005: Lokeren

Willy Reynders (born 16 April 1954) is a Belgian football manager.
