= 1988 European Super Cup =

KV Mechelen	PSV Eindhoven
(Belgium)	(Netherlands)
3	1
- on aggregate

First leg
KV Mechelen	PSV Eindhoven
3	0
- Date: 1 February 1989
- Venue: Argosstadion Achter de Kazerne, Mechelen
- Referee: Siegfried Kirschen (East Germany)
- Attendance: 7,000

Second leg
PSV Eindhoven	KV Mechelen
1	0
- Date: 8 February 1989
- Venue: Philips Stadion, Eindhoven
- Referee: Erik Fredriksson (Sweden)
- Attendance: 17,100

The 1988 European Super Cup was played between KV Mechelen, winners of the 1987–88 European Cup Winners' Cup, and PSV Eindhoven, winners of the 1987–88 European Cup, with Mechelen winning 3–1 on aggregate. This fixture involved one of the shortest cross-border distances in a major tie in continental football, with only 90 kilometres (56 mi) between the host cities. It is also the most recent occasion when a club from Belgium won a European trophy.

== Match details ==
=== First leg ===
1 February 1989

KV Mechelen (Belgium)	3–0	(Netherlands) PSV Eindhoven
Bosman 16', 50'; De Wilde 17'	Report

Argosstadion Achter de Kazerne, Mechelen
Attendance: 7,000
Referee: Siegfried Kirschen (East Germany)

KV Mechelen	PSV Eindhoven

KV Mechelen:
GK	1	(Belgium) Michel Preud'homme (c)
RB	2	(Belgium) Koen Sanders
CB	3	(Belgium) Marc Emmers
CB	4	(Netherlands) Graeme Rutjes
LB	5	(Belgium) Bruno Versavel
RM	6	(Netherlands) Wim Hofkens
CM	7	(Netherlands) Erwin Koeman	(substituted off) 58'
CM	9	(Netherlands) John Bosman	(substituted off) 90'
LM	10	(Belgium) Paul De Mesmaeker
CF	8	(Belgium) Pascal De Wilde
CF	11	(Netherlands) Piet den Boer
Subtitutions:
DF	12	(Belgium) Geert Deferm	(substituted on) 58'
FW	14	(Belgium) Marc Wilmots	(substituted on) 90'
Manager:
(Netherlands) Aad de Mos

PSV Eindhoven:
GK	1	(Netherlands) Patrick Lodewijks
RB	2	(Belgium) Eric Gerets (c)
CB	3	(Netherlands) Stan Valckx
CB	4	(Netherlands) Ronald Koeman
LB	5	(Netherlands) John Veldman
RM	8	(Netherlands) Gerald Vanenburg
CM	7	(Netherlands) Berry van Aerle	(yellow card) 3'
CM	6	(Denmark) Søren Lerby
LM	11	(Netherlands) Anton Janssen	(substituted off) 73'
CF	9	(Brazil) Romário
CF	10	(Netherlands) Hans Gillhaus
Subtitutions:
FW	14	(Netherlands) Juul Ellerman	(substituted on) 73'
Manager:
(Netherlands) Guus Hiddink

=== Second leg ===
8 February 1989

PSV Eindhoven (Netherlands)	1–0	(Belgium) KV Mechelen
Gillhaus 78'	Report

Philips Stadion, Eindhoven
Attendance: 17,100
Referee: Erik Fredriksson (Sweden)

PSV Eindhoven	KV Mechelen

PSV Eindhoven:
GK	1	(Netherlands) Patrick Lodewijks
RB	2	(Belgium) Eric Gerets (c)
CB	4	(Netherlands) Ronald Koeman
CB	7	(Netherlands) Berry van Aerle
LB	5	(Denmark) Jan Heintze
RM	8	(Netherlands) Gerald Vanenburg	(yellow card) 18'
CM	3	(Czech Republic) Jozef Chovanec
LM	6	(Netherlands) Edward Linskens	(substituted off) 66'
RW	11	(Netherlands) Juul Ellerman
CF	9	(Brazil) Romário
LW	10	(Netherlands) Hans Gillhaus
Subtitutions:
DF	15	(Netherlands) Stan Valckx	(substituted on) 66'
Coach:
(Netherlands) Guus Hiddink

KV Mechelen:
GK	(Belgium) Michel Preud'homme (c)
RB	(Belgium) Koen Sanders	(yellow card) 72'
CB	(Belgium) Marc Emmers	(substituted off) 39'
CB	(Netherlands) Graeme Rutjes
LB	(Belgium) Geert Deferm
RM	(Netherlands) Wim Hofkens
CM	(Netherlands) John Bosman
LM	(Belgium) Bruno Versavel
RW	(Belgium) Pascal De Wilde	(yellow card) 37'
CF	(Netherlands) Piet den Boer
LW	(Belgium) Paul De Mesmaeker
Subtitutions:
MF	(Netherlands) Erwin Koeman	(substituted on) 39'
Coach:
Aad de Mos

KV Mechelen won 3–1 on aggregate.

== See also ==
- 1988–89 European Cup
- 1988–89 European Cup Winners' Cup
- PSV Eindhoven in European football
