= Bruno Versavel =

Belgian footballer (born 1967)

- Versavel with Perugia in 1997

Personal information
- Date of birth: 27 August 1967 (age 59)
- Place of birth: Diest, Belgium
- Height: 1.85 m (6 ft 1 in)
- Position: Midfielder

Senior career*
Years	Team	Apps	(Gls)
1986–1988	Sporting Lokeren	65	(18)
1988–1991	KV Mechelen	106	(25)
1992–1997	Anderlecht	148	(37)
1997–1998	Perugia	16	(1)
1998	Lugano	3	(0)
1998–1999	KFC Herentals	31	(15)
1999–2000	Geel	23	(2)
2000–2007	Turnhout	177	(89)
2007–2011	KFC Diest		

International career
1988–1995	Belgium	28	(4)

Managerial career
- 2012–2015: KSV Oud-Turnhout
- 2017–2018: KFCMD Halen
- 2018: KOVC Sterrebeek
- 2019: KESK Leopoldsburg
- * Club domestic league appearances and goals

Bruno Versavel (born 27 August 1967) is a Belgian former professional footballer who played as a midfielder, most notably for KV Mechelen and R.S.C. Anderlecht.

== Playing career ==
Born in Diest, Versavel made his debut in professional football at KFC Diest before moving to KSC Lokeren. While at KV Mechelen, he won the Belgian League and the European Super Cup. He then moved to R.S.C. Anderlecht, where he played five seasons. He also played for Serie B side AC Perugia and Swiss club FC Lugano before moving back to Belgium to play for FC Herentals, K.F.C. Verbroedering Geel and K.V. Turnhout. Versavel earned 28 caps for the Belgium national team, scoring four times.

== Coaching career ==
After retiring in 2012, he became manager of KSV Oud-Turnhout. Versavel left the club in the summer 2015 because had an oral agreement with KVK Beringen. However, KVK Beringen did not keep their word and chose another coach.

Versavel was then without a club until 24 January 2017, when it was announced that he had become the new manager of KFCMD Halen. On 5 March 2018, he became the manager of KOVC Sterrebeek. He was fired four months later.

In February 2019, it was confirmed that Versavel would take charge of KESK Leopoldsburg from the upcoming 2019–20 season. But already in October 2019, it was decided by mutual consultation to end the cooperation.

== Career statistics ==
=== International goals ===
Scores and results list Belgium's goal tally first, score column indicates score after each Versavel goal.

List of international goals scored by Bruno Versavel
No.	Date	Venue	Opponent	Score	Result	Competition
1	17 October 1990	Heysel Stadium, Brussels, Belgium	Luxembourg		1–1	1990 World Cup qualifying
2	2 June 1990	Heysel Stadium, Brussels, Belgium	Mexico		3–0	Friendly
3	17 October 1990	Cardiff Arms Park, Cardiff, Wales	Wales		1–3	Euro 1992 qualifying
4	7 June 1995	Gradski Stadion, Skopje, Macedonia	North Macedonia		5–0	Euro 1996 qualifying

== Honours ==
=== Player ===
KV Mechelen

- Belgian First Division: 1988–89
- European Super Cup: 1988
- Amsterdam Tournament: 1989
- Joan Gamper Trophy: 1989
- Jules Pappaert Cup: 1990

Anderlecht

- Belgian First Division: 1992–93, 1993–94, 1994–95
- Belgian Cup: 1993–94; runner-up 1996–97
- Belgian Super Cup: 1993, 1995
