= KV Mechelen =

Belgian association football club

- Full name: Yellow Red Koninklijke; Voetbalclub Mechelen
- Nicknames: De Kakkers, Malinois, Malinwa, Geel-rood
- Founded: 1904; 122 years ago
- Ground: Achter de Kazerne
- Capacity: 16,672
- Chairman: Luc Leemans
- Head coach: Frederik Vanderbiest
- League: Belgian Pro League
- 2025–26: Belgian Pro League, 6th of 16
- Website: www.kvmechelen.be
Home colours	Away colours	Third colours

Yellow Red Koninklijke Voetbalclub Mechelen (Dutch pronunciation: [ˌjɛloː ˈrɛt ˌkoːnɪŋkləkə ˌvudbɑlklʏp ˈmɛxələ(n)]), often called KV Mechelen (Dutch pronunciation: [kaːˌveː ˈmɛxələ(n)], KVM) or simply by their former French name Malinois ([ˌmalɪˈnwɑː]), is a Belgian professional football club based in Mechelen in the Antwerp province. KV Mechelen plays in the Belgian Pro League. They have won four Belgian championships and twice the Belgian Cup, as well as the 1987–88 European Cup Winners' Cup and the 1988 European Super Cup. They collected most of their honours in the 1940s and in the 1980s.

KV Mechelen was founded in 1904 and, in 1921–22, promoted to the first division. After two successive relegation and promotion, they were back for good between 1928–29 and 1955–56. In the 1960s and 1970s, the club had several promotions and relegations between the first and second division. From 1983–84 to 1996–97, they had a successful first division spell, with a title and several second- and third-place finishes. During that period, they also won a European Cup Winners' Cup and they reached the same competition semi-finals as well as the European Cup quarter-finals.

KV Mechelen declined in the late 1990s though they had two more spells at the highest level from 1999–2000 to 2000–01 and in 2002–03. At the end of that season, the club did not receive their Belgian professional football license. They were therefore relegated to the third division with a nine-point penalty. After two promotions in 2004–05 and in 2006–07, KV Mechelen returned to the first division.

The club's outfits are a striped yellow and red shirt with black shorts and socks. They play their home matches at the AFAS-stadion Achter de Kazerne, where AFAS is their stadium sponsor and Achter de Kazerne means 'Behind the Barracks'. The stadium has been named so because there used to be barracks next to stadium. KV Mechelen fans have a long-standing rivalry with KRC Mechelen.

== History ==
=== Early days ===
The club was founded in 1904, a few months after the birth of city rival KRC Mechelen. The club had a first successful period in the 1940s. During World War II, in 1943, the club won their first domestic title. The second title came a few years later, in 1946, and in 1948 the club was successful again. After that, the club fell back. In 1954, they managed to finish third, only one point behind champions Anderlecht, but that was their last good season. Two years later, Mechelen was relegated to second division. During the 1960s and the 1970s, Mechelen went up and down between the first and second division.

=== High days ===
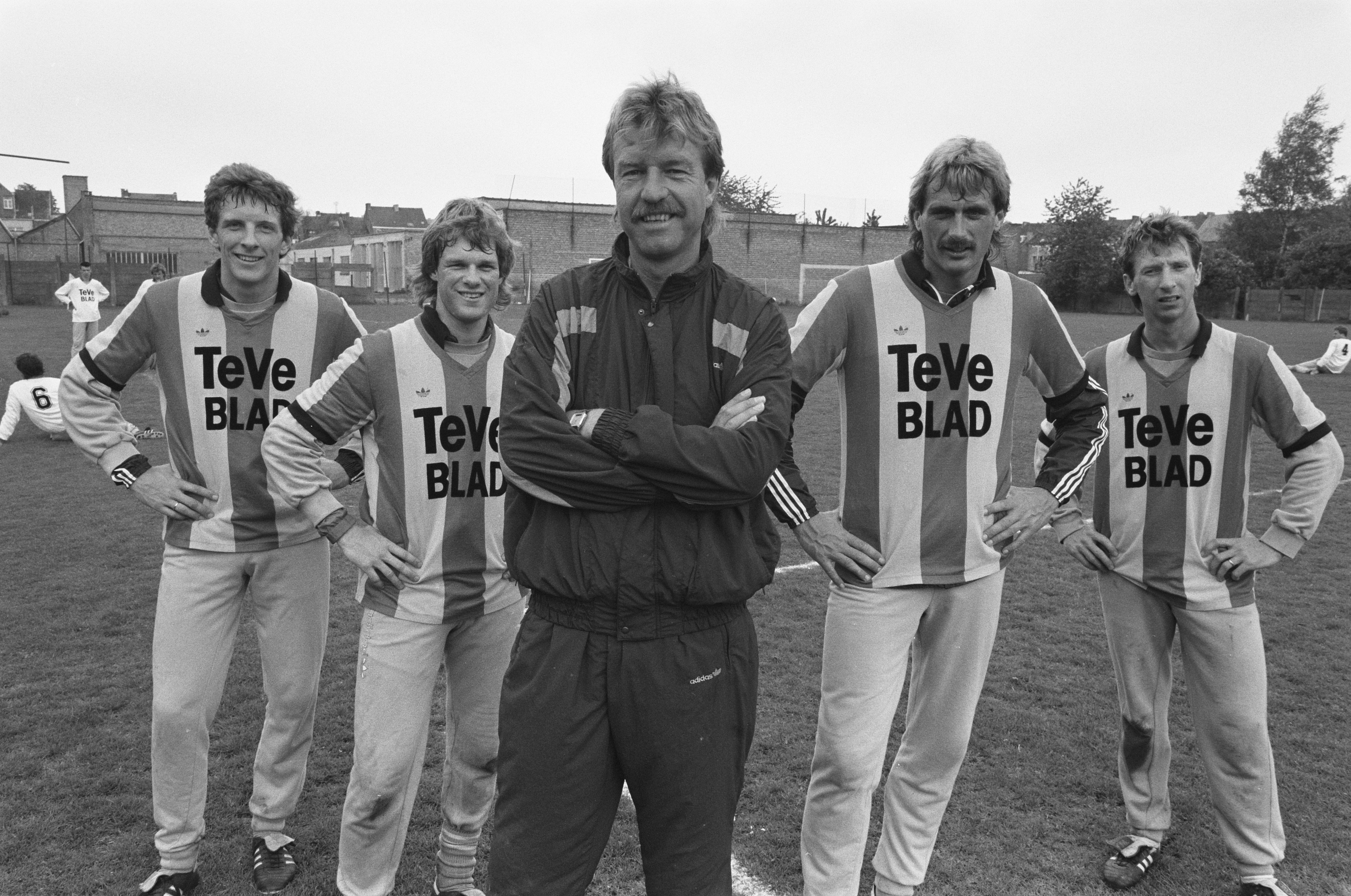
Graeme Rutjes, Erwin Koeman, Aad de Mos, Piet den Boer & Wim Hofkens, 1988

The club enjoyed a spell of both domestic and European success in the period from 1987 to 1992. During these five seasons, Mechelen won one Belgian championship and one Belgian cup title. They also finished second in the Belgian league twice and lost the Belgian Cup final twice. After winning the domestic cup title in 1987, and hence qualifying for the European Winners' Cup, they won this tournament in 1988. Coached by Aad de Mos, the balanced team with international players like Michel Preud'Homme, Lei Clijsters, Erwin Koeman, Marc Emmers and Eli Ohana defeated Ajax in the final 1–0. In the 1988–89 season, the team also won the European Super Cup against another Dutch side, PSV Eindhoven. Mechelen are the last Belgian team that has won a European trophy.

KV Mechelen seemed to be on its way to becoming one of the top clubs in Belgium, but quickly declined when their chairman John Cordier (who owned the rights to most of their players) was forced to sell many players due to his company's bad results. A few years in a row, Anderlecht, located in nearby Brussels, attracted top players from Mechelen such as Graeme Rutjes, Johnny Bosman, Marc Emmers, Bruno Versavel, Philippe Albert and Glen de Boeck. Coach de Mos also made the switch.

In 1997, Mechelen finished second to last again, and was therefore relegated to the Second Division.

=== Since 2000 ===
On 10 June 2007, the team achieved promotion to the Belgian First Division. Two years later in 2009, KV Mechelen played the final of the Belgian Cup, losing it 2–0 to Genk. One year after that, they stranded in the semi-finals with a 2–2 draw and a 1–0 loss against KAA Gent.

After a successful 2010 and four seasons for the yellow reds, coach Peter Maes decided to leave Malinwa and signed a four-year contract with Lokeren. Malinwa made a deal with Marc Brys to take over from Maes. Marc Brys was coach of FC Den Bosch, a second division team in the Netherlands. After two seasons he was sacked and Harm Van Veldhoven was appointed for the 2012–13 season. Van Veldhoven also could not lead KV Mechelen to Play-off 1, the clubs' recent unspoken ambition. He was fired in December 2013. At the end of the 2013–14 season KV Mechelen appointed Aleksandar Janković as head coach. Despite Janković's inability to lead the club to Play-off 1, Janković left for topclub Standard Liège and Mechelen had to appoint a new manager. The club ended up choosing Yannick Ferrera for the vacant job, who had just been fired as manager of Standard Liège.

=== Match-fixing and 2017–19 Belgian football fraud scandal ===
2017 through 2019 proved to be a tumultuous period for the club. After eleven seasons at the highest level, the club was relegated on the last day of the 2017–18 season as a 2–0 win over Waasland-Beveren left them in last place on goal difference, due to Eupen beating Moeskroen by a bigger margin (4–0). During the following season, while the club was very successful on the pitch, winning both the 2018–19 Belgian First Division B and the 2018–19 Belgian Cup, the 2017–19 Belgian football fraud scandal emerged in which the club was accused of match-fixing their final match of the 2017–18 season, allegedly having attempted to bribe certain players and officials of Waasland-Beveren.

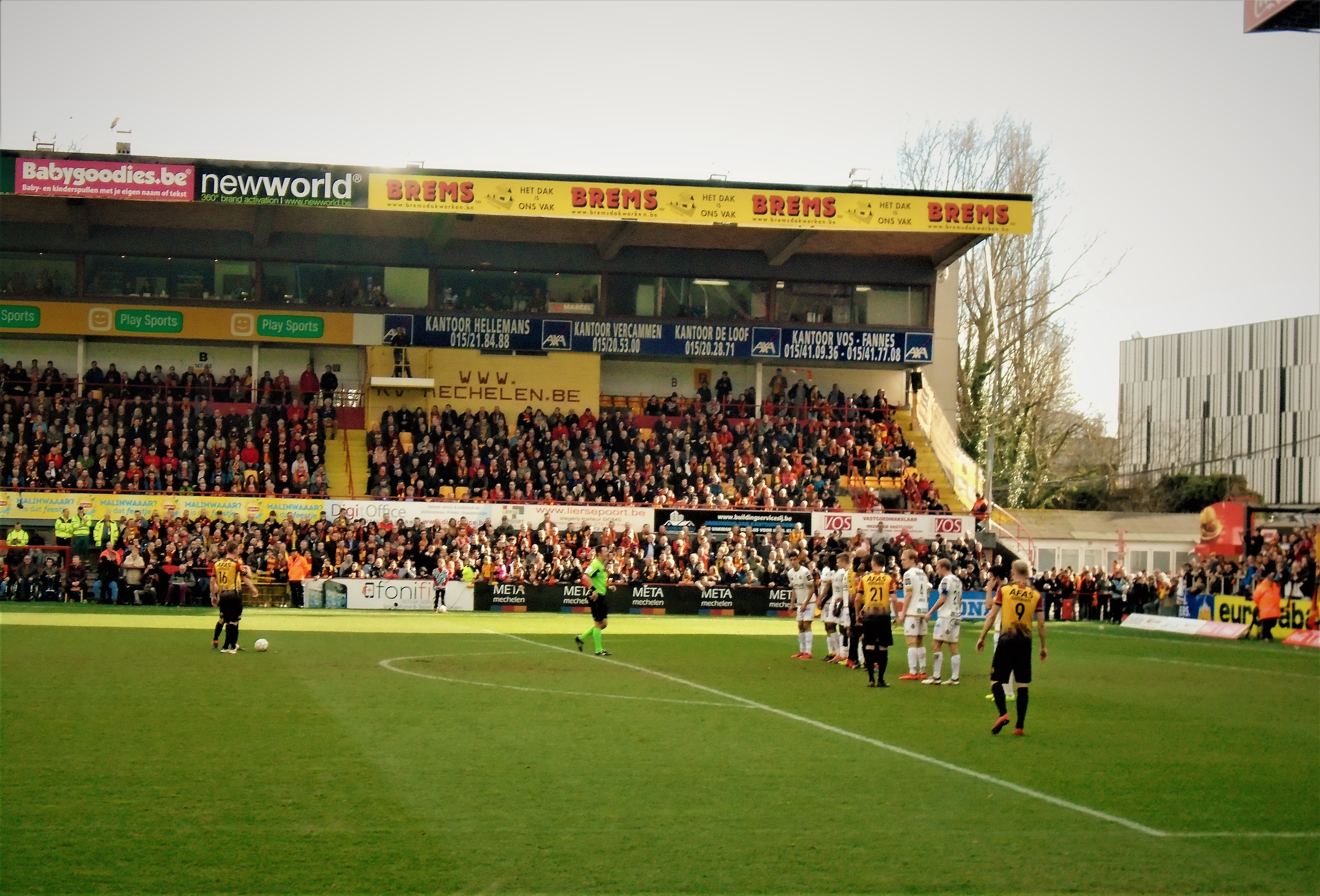
Mechelen vs. Waasland-Beveren (2018)

In March 2019, the club was found guilty and forced to relegate back to the First Division B despite winning promotion, and also denied permission to take part in the 2019–20 Belgian Cup and 2019–20 UEFA Europa League, the latter for which they had qualified by winning the cup. The club appealed the decision at the Belgian Arbitration Court for Sports which ruled on 10 July 2019 that, in accordance with the rules set by the Royal Belgian Football Association, relegation was not a possible punishment in the circumstances. As a result, the club was punished with a one-season ban from European football and the Belgian Cup. The proceedings were plagued with controversy, with evidence (including witness statements) from an investigation into financial crimes in Belgian football not being made available during these disciplinary proceedings, as well as the impartiality of the prosecutor being called into question.

=== Second Belgian Cup ===
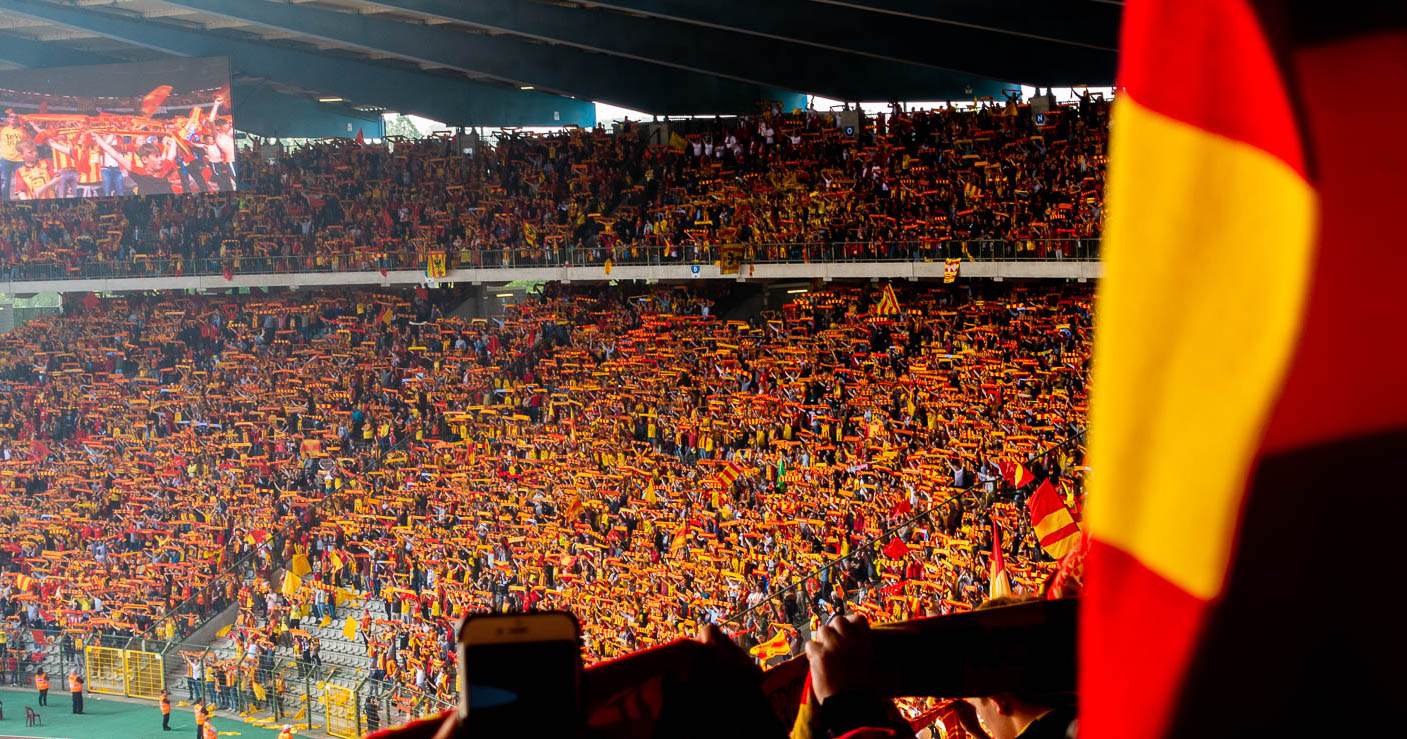
Fans celebrate the cup win in Brussels.

In May 2019, more than 30 years after their last major trophy, second division side Mechelen won the Belgian Cup after a 2–1 victory over Gent in the final at the King Baudouin Stadium. Germán Mera scored the winning goal after Nikola Storm made the equalizer.

== Rivalries ==
KV Mechelen's traditional rival is Racing Mechelen. However, the two have sparingly met in the modern era, the last time being in 2005, where the game had to be stopped due to crowd violence. Traditionally KV Mechelen was the club of the Catholic elite in the city, while Racing was set up by the secular, liberal classes, with nationalist sympathies. KV Mechelen has since taken on a more broader support from the Antwerp province and beyond, while Racing's support has died down due to being in inferior divisions.

KV Mechelen also have a rivalry with football clubs from the neighbouring town of Lier (mainly Lierse SK and its successors). They additionally have a rivalry with Beerschot Antwerp, which was heightened during the match-fixing scandal of 2017–2019, due to Mechelen's promotion instead of Beerschot despite being found guilty of match fixing in the previous season.

== Honours ==
=== Domestic ===
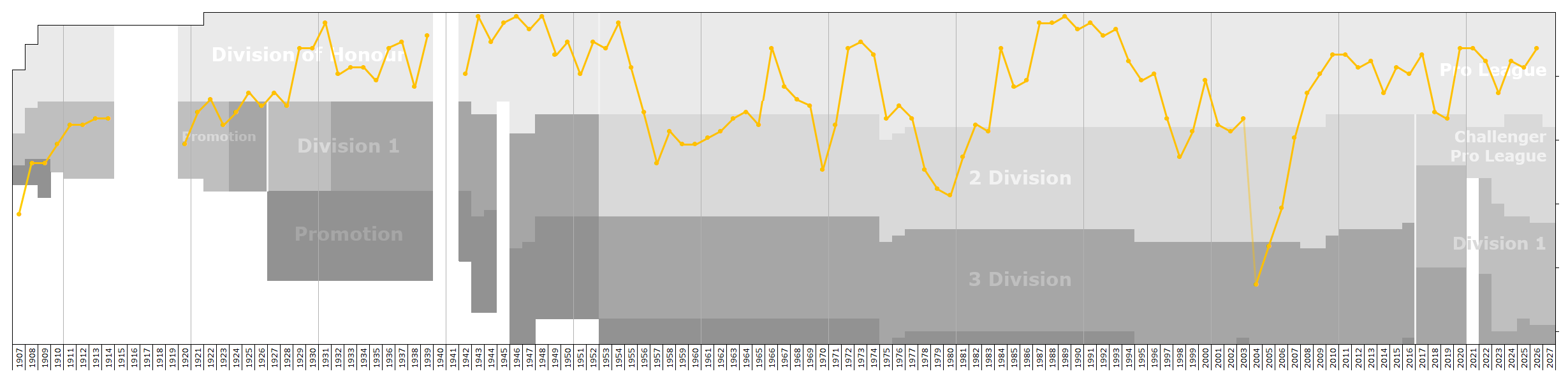
Historical chart of KV Mechelen league performance

- Belgian First Division A
  - Champions (4): 1942–43, 1945–46, 1947–48, 1988–89
- Belgian Cup
  - Winners (2): 1986–87, 2018–19
- Belgian Second Division
  - Winners (7): 1925–26, 1927–28, 1962–63, 1982–83, 1998–99, 2001–02, 2018–19
- Belgian Second Division final round
  - Winners: 1981, 2007, 2019
- Belgian Third Division
  - Winners: 2004–05

=== International ===
- European Cup Winners Cup
  - Winners: 1987–88
- European Super Cup
  - Winners: 1988

== European record ==
KV Mechelen's Belgian Cup win in 1987 saw the club participate in UEFA club competition for the first time in their history, entering the 1987–88 European Cup Winners' Cup. It proved to be a highly successful campaign, with Mechelen reaching the final undefeated by winning seven of their eight matches en route. They then went on to defeat Ajax 1–0 in the final, Piet den Boer scoring the decisive goal early in the second half. The following season Mechelen played 1988 European Cup winners PSV in the UEFA Super Cup, and defeated the Dutch side 3–1 on aggregate. Mechelen remain the last Belgian club team to have won a European club competition.

As of December 2008.

Competition	A	GP	W	D	L	GF	GA
European Cup / UEFA Champions League	1	6	2	3	1	9	3
UEFA Cup Winners' Cup	2	17	13	3	1	26	8
UEFA Cup / UEFA Europa League	4	14	3	5	6	14	15
UEFA Super Cup	1	2	1	0	1	3	1

A = appearances, GP = games played, W = won, D = drawn, L = lost, GF = goals for, GA = goals against.

== Results ==
- Q = qualification round
- PO = play-off
- R = round
- Group = group stage / Group 1 = first group stage / Group 2 = second group stage
- 1/8 = eighth finals / 1/4 = quarter-finals / 1/2 = semi-finals
- F = final

Season	Competition	Round	Country	Club	Score
1987–88	UEFA Cup Winners' Cup	1R	(Romania)	Dinamo București	1–0, 2–0
1987–88	UEFA Cup Winners' Cup	2R	(Scotland)	St Mirren	0–0, 2–0
1987–88	UEFA Cup Winners' Cup	1/4	(Soviet Union)	Dinamo Minsk	1–0, 1–1
1987–88	UEFA Cup Winners' Cup	1/2	(Italy)	Atalanta	2–1, 2–1
1987–88	UEFA Cup Winners' Cup	F	(Netherlands)	Ajax	1–0
1988	UEFA Super Cup	F	(Netherlands)	PSV	3–0, 0–1
1988–89	UEFA Cup Winners' Cup	1R	(Luxembourg)	Avenir Beggen	5–0, 3–1
1988–89	UEFA Cup Winners' Cup	2R	(Belgium)	Anderlecht	1–0, 2–0
1988–89	UEFA Cup Winners' Cup	1/4	(Germany)	Eintracht Frankfurt	1–0, 0–0
1988–89	UEFA Cup Winners' Cup	1/2	(Italy)	Sampdoria	2–1, 0–3
1989–90	European Cup	1R	(Norway)	Rosenborg	5–0, 0–0
1989–90	European Cup	2R	(Sweden)	Malmö FF	4–1, 0–0
1989–90	European Cup	1/4	(Italy)	Milan	0–0, 0–2 (AET)
1990–91	UEFA Cup	1R	(Portugal)	Sporting CP	2–2, 0–1
1991–92	UEFA Cup	1R	(Greece)	PAOK	0–1, 1–1
1992–93	UEFA Cup	1R	(Sweden)	Örebro SK	2–1, 0–0
1992–93	UEFA Cup	2R	(Netherlands)	Vitesse	0–1, 0–1
1993–94	UEFA Cup	1R	(Sweden)	IFK Norrköping	1–1 (AET), 1–0
1993–94	UEFA Cup	2R	(Hungary)	MTK Hungária	5–0, 1–1
1993–94	UEFA Cup	3R	(Italy)	Cagliari	1–3, 0–2

=== Summary of best results ===
European Cup/UEFA Champions League:

- Quarter-finalists in 1990

UEFA Cup Winners' Cup (1):

- Winners in 1988
- Semi-finalists in 1989

UEFA Super Cup (1):

- Winners in 1988

== Players ==
=== Current squad ===
As of 12 September 2026

Note: Flags indicate national team as defined under FIFA eligibility rules; some limited exceptions apply. Players may hold more than one non-FIFA nationality.

No.	Pos.	Nation	Player
1	GK	BEL	Ortwin De Wolf
2	DF	NED	Luc Marijnissen
3	DF	ESP	José Marsà
4	DF	SEN	Gora Diouf
5	DF	NOR	Leo Hjelde
6	MF	SWE	Fredrik Hammar
7	DF	FRA	Thérence Koudou
8	MF	GER	Dikeni Salifou
9	FW	NED	Myron van Brederode
10	MF	BLR	Maksim Kireev
11	MF	BEL	Bilal Bafdili
13	GK	ESP	Nacho Miras
14	FW	BEL	Benito Raman
15	GK	BEL	Tijn Van Ingelgom
16	FW	NGR	Adeshina Adoyele
17	FW	BEL	Cedric Van Meirvenne
18	DF	BEL	Ian Struyf

No.	Pos.	Nation	Player
19	FW	BEL	Malcolm Lohunanu-Mbasi
20	DF	BEL	Kobe Corbanie
21	FW	TUR	Halil Özdemir
23	MF	CMR	Simion Michez
26	MF	BEL	Dennis Praet
27	FW	BEL	Keano Vanrafelghem
28	FW	NED	Bouke Boersma
29	FW	ZIM	Bill Antonio
30	MF	FRA	Marco Decherf
32	GK	BEL	Axel Willockx
33	DF	CUW	Tommy St. Jago
39	MF	BEL	Massimo Decoene
40	MF	MAR	Amine Ouahabi
43	MF	AUS	Ryan Teague
44	DF	NED	Mike Eerdhuijzen
49	MF	BEL	Mats Van Helden
-	MF	MAR	Yanis Asghir

=== Out on loan ===
Note: Flags indicate national team as defined under FIFA eligibility rules; some limited exceptions apply. Players may hold more than one non-FIFA nationality.

No.	Pos.	Nation	Player
—	DF	SLO	Lovro Golič (at Helmond Sport until 30 June 2027)
—	DF	MAR	Wassim Lantaki (at Helmond Sport until 30 June 2027)

No.	Pos.	Nation	Player
—	FW	BEL	Mauro Lenaerts (at Helmond Sport until 30 June 2027)

== Notable former players ==
Africa
Algeria

- (Algeria) Sofiane Hanni
- (Algeria) Islam Slimani

Burkina Faso

- (Burkina Faso) Hassane Bandé

DR Congo

- (Democratic Republic of the Congo) Roger Lukaku

Asia
Indonesia

- (Indonesia) Sandy Walsh

Taiwan

- (Taiwan) Xavier Chen

Europe
Belgium

- (Belgium) Albert De Cleyn
- (Belgium) Marino Sabbadini
- (Belgium) Michel Preud'homme
- (Belgium) Lei Clijsters
- (Belgium) Koen Sanders
- (Belgium) Philippe Albert
- (Belgium) Theo Custers
- (Belgium) Marc Wilmots
- (Belgium) Christian Kabasele
- (Belgium) Bjorn Vleminckx
- (Belgium) Mats Rits
- (Belgium) Christian Benteke

Bosnia and Herzegovina

- (Bosnia and Herzegovina) Edin Cocalić
- (Bosnia and Herzegovina) Boris Pandža
- (Bosnia and Herzegovina) Marijo Dodik
- (Bosnia and Herzegovina) Senad Karahmet

Croatia

- (Croatia) Ljuban Crepulja

Denmark

- (Denmark) Nicklas Pedersen

Greece

- (Greece) Sotiris Ninis

Israel

- (Israel) Eli Ohana
Luxembourg

- (Luxembourg) Anthony Moris

Montenegro
- (Montenegro) Fatos Bećiraj
Portugal
- (Portugal) Sérgio Oliveira
Sweden
- (Sweden) Klas Ingesson
- (Sweden) Kennet Andersson
The Netherlands
- (Netherlands) Piet Den Boer
- (Netherlands) Erwin Koeman
- (Netherlands) Graeme Rutjes
- (Netherlands) John Bosman
- (Netherlands) René Eijkelkamp
- (Netherlands) Wim Hofkens
- (Netherlands) Michael Verrips

== Coaching staff ==
As of 5 March 2025

Position	Staff
Head coach	Vacant
Assistant Coach	(Belgium) Frédéric Vanderbiest (Belgium) Gunter Van Handenhoven
Goalkeeping coach	(Belgium) Stef Pauwels
Physical coach	(France) Thibaut Meyer
Rehabilitation coach	(Belgium) Dennes De Kegel
Physiotherapist	(Belgium) Bart De Bruyn (Belgium) Dieter Devaere (Belgium) Iris De Clercq
Doctor	(Belgium) Christophe Sintebin (Belgium) Hendrik Gevers (Belgium) Robin Van Houdt
Kit manager	(Belgium) Marc Bols (Belgium) Paul Weemaes
Team manager	(Belgium) Greet De Jagher
Video analyst	(Belgium) Jordi Jansen

=== Coaching history ===
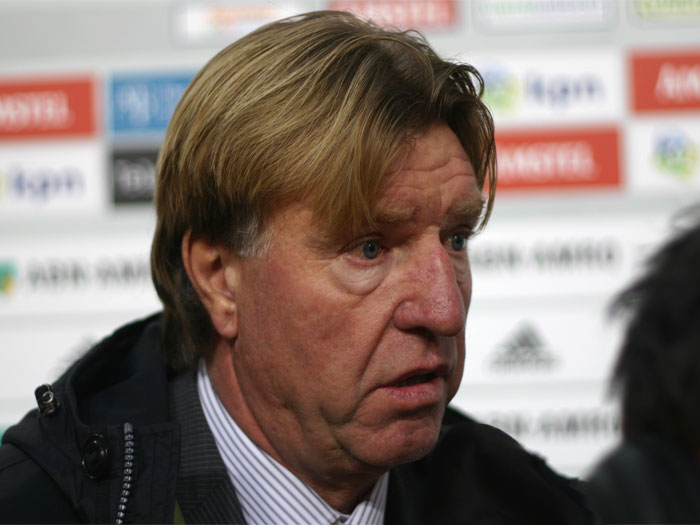
Aad de Mos is Mechelen's most successful manager, winning one league title, one cup, one European Cup Winners' Cup and one European Super Cup

- (Belgium) Désiré Bourgeois (1947–53), (1954–55)
- (Belgium) Albert De Cleyn (1955–57)
- (Belgium) Émile Stijnen (1959–61)
- (Romania) Oliver Gaspar (1960–64)
- (Hungary) András Dolgos (1965–68)
- (Belgium) Piet Teughels (1968–69)
- (England) Keith Spurgeon (1969–70)
- (Belgium) Staf Van den Bergh (1970–75)
- (Belgium) André Bollen (1975–77)
- (England) John Talbut (1977–78)
- (Belgium) Piet Teughels (1979)
- (Socialist Federal Republic of Yugoslavia) Nedeljko Bulatović (1979–81)
- (Belgium) Kamiel Van Damme (1981–82)
- (Netherlands) Leo Canjels (1982–85)
- (Germany) Ernst Künnecke (1985–86)
- (Netherlands) Aad de Mos (1 February 1986 – 30 June 1989)
- (Netherlands) Ruud Krol, (Belgium) Fi Van Hoof (1 July 1989 – 14 January 1990)
- (Belgium) Fi Van Hoof (1990–91)
- (Belgium) Georges Leekens (1 July 1991 – 30 June 1992)
- (Belgium) Fi Van Hoof (1992–94)
- (Belgium) Walter Meeuws (1 July 1994 – 1 August 1995)
- (Belgium) Walter Meeuws, (Belgium) Willy Reynders (1995–96)
- (Belgium) Willy Reynders, (Belgium) Georges Heylens (1996–97)
- (Belgium) Franky Vercauteren (1997 – June 30, 1998)
- (Belgium) Rudy Verkempinck, (Belgium) Gunther Jacob & (Belgium) Valère Billen (1998–99)
- (Belgium) Gunther Jacob (1999–00)
- (Belgium) L. Clijsters, (Belgium) V. Billen & (Netherlands) B. Hulshoff (1 July 2000 – 30 June 2001)
- (Netherlands) Barry Hulshoff, (Belgium) Fi Van Hoof (2001–02)
- (Belgium) Stéphane Demol, (Belgium) Alex Czerniatynski (30 November 2002 – 30 June 2003)
- (Belgium) Alex Czerniatynski (2003–04)
- (Belgium) Rik Vande Velde, (Serbia) Živica Kanački (1 July 2004 – 25 January 2005)
- (Netherlands) André Wetzel, (Serbia) Živica Kanački (2005 – June 30, 2006)
- (Belgium) Peter Maes (1 July 2006 – 30 June 2010)
- (Belgium) Marc Brys (1 July 2010 – 30 June 2012)
- (Belgium) Harm van Veldhoven (1 July 2012 – 30 December 2013)
- (Belgium) Franky Vercauteren (5 January 2014 – 5 May 2014)
- (Serbia) Aleksandar Janković (8 May 2014 – 6 September 2016)
- (Belgium) Yannick Ferrera (12 September 2016 – 22 October 2017)
- (Serbia) Aleksandar Janković (2 November 2017 – Jan 2018)
- (Netherlands) Dennis van Wijk (Jan 2018 – Aug 2018)
- (Belgium) Wouter Vrancken (Aug 2018 – May 2022)
- (Netherlands) Danny Buijs (1 June 2022 – 17 October 2022)
- (Belgium) Steven Defour (17 October 2022 – 2 November 2023)
- (Kosovo) (Albania) Besnik Hasi (8 November 2023 – 3 March 2025)
- (Belgium) Frederik Vanderbiest (1 July 2025 – )

== Chairmen history ==
Date	Name
1904–06	(Belgium) Théophile Delvaulx
1906–51	(Belgium) Francis Dessain
1951–77	(Belgium) Patrick Dessain
1977–82	(Belgium) Herman Candries
1982–92	(Belgium) John Cordier
1992–94	(Belgium) Willy Dussart

Date	Name
1994–97	(Belgium) Jef De Graef
1997–02	(Belgium) Willy Van den Wijngaert
2003	(Belgium) Mark Uytterhoeven
2003–2018	(Belgium) Johan Timmermans
2018–2020	(Belgium) Dieter Penninckx
2020–	(Belgium) Luc Leemans

== See also ==
- 2017–19 Belgian football fraud scandal
