= 1990–91 Belgian Cup =

Tournament details
- Country: Belgium

Final positions
- Champions: Club Brugge
- Runners-up: KV Mechelen

Tournament statistics
- Top goal scorer(s): Bruno Versavel; Edi Krnčević (6 goals)

The 1990–91 Belgian Cup was the 36th season of the main knockout competition in Belgian association football, the Belgian Cup.

== Final rounds ==
The final phase started when all clubs from the top two divisions in Belgian football entered the competition in the round of 64 (18 clubs from first division, 16 clubs from second division and 30 clubs from the qualifications). The first 3 rounds were played in one leg, while the next 2 rounds (quarter-finals and semifinals) were played in two legs. The final game was played at the Heysel Stadium between Club Brugge and KV Mechelen, Club Brugge winning 3–1.

=== Bracket ===
1st Round
Bornem	2
Cercle Brugge	1
Anderlecht	4
Poederlee	2
Tienen	0
Club Brugge	1
Geel	5
Denderleeuw	2
Hasselt	1
Beveren	2
Eeklo	2
Mons	1
Standard Liège	7
Mol	0
Ourodenberg-Aarschot	1
Sint-Truidense	0
Lierse	3*
Saint-Gilloise	2
R Charleroi SC	4
Aalter	0
Menen	1(2)
Wavre	1(3)
Kortrijk	3
Strombeek	0
KFC Roeselare	3
Sint-Niklase	1
Lommel	2
Westerlo	1
Tilleur	1
Gent	3
Namur	1
KRC Mechelen	2
FC Liège	5
Binche	0
Aalst	3
Hemptinne	0
Eupen	1
Genk	3
Torhout	1
Germinal Ekeren	7
Patro Eisden	1
RRC Tournaisien	0
Zwarte Leeuw	2
Andrimont	0
Lokeren	3
Oostende	1
Tessenderlo	0
Leuven	5
Duffel	0
Antwerp	8
Aubel	0
Beerschot	1*
Waregem	0
Hoogstraten	1
Turnhout	1(4)
Boom	1(5)
Lyra	1(3)
Molenbeek	1(1)
Tongeren	3
Witgoor Sport Dessel	0
Diest	4
Zele	1
KV Mechelen	5
Kampenhout	0

2nd Round
Bornem	0
Anderlecht	6
Club Brugge	2
Geel	0
Beveren	1(4)
Eeklo	1(1)
Standard Liège	4
Ourodenberg-Aarschot	2
Lierse	1
R Charleroi SC	2*
Wavre	3
Kortrijk	0
KFC Roeselare	2
Lommel	4
Gent	0(4)
KRC Mechelen	0(5)
FC Liège	3
Aalst	0
Genk	2
Germinal Ekeren	0
Patro Eisden	0
Zwarte Leeuw	1
Lokeren	1(11)
Leuven	1(10)
Antwerp	5
Beerschot	0
Hoogstraten	1
Boom	0
Lyra	0
Tongeren	1
Diest	1
KV Mechelen	3

3rd Round
Anderlecht	0
Club Brugge	2
Beveren	1
Standard Liège	0
R Charleroi SC	5
Wavre	0
Lommel	0(8)
KRC Mechelen	0(7)
FC Liège	3*
Genk	1
Zwarte Leeuw	0
Lokeren	3
Antwerp	2
Hoogstraten	0
Tongeren	1
KV Mechelen	2*

Quarterfinals
Club Brugge	1	1
Beveren	0	1
R Charleroi SC	0	1
Lommel	2	3
FC Liège	1	1
Lokeren	0	5
Antwerp	0	0
KV Mechelen	1	1

Semifinals
Club Brugge	1	1
Lommel	0	0
Lokeren	1	1
KV Mechelen	3	1

Finals
Club Brugge	3
KV Mechelen	1

* after extra time

=== Final ===
15 June 1991
19:00

Club Brugge	3–1	KV Mechelen
Farina 28'; Booy 75'; Ceulemans 90' (pen.)	Report	Versavel 80'

Heysel Stadium, Brussels
Attendance: 25.000
Referee: Frans Van Den Wijngaert
