= 1988–89 Belgian First Division =

86th season of top-tier football in Belgium

Belgian First Division
- Season: 1988–89

Statistics of Belgian League in season 1988–89.

== Overview ==
Location of teams in Belgian First Division 1988–89

It was contested by 18 teams, and KV Mechelen won the championship, while R.W.D. Molenbeek & K.R.C. Genk were relegated.

== League standings ==
Pos	Team	Pld	W	D	L	GF	GA	GD	Pts	Qualification or relegation
1	KV Mechelen	34	25	7	2	64	20	+44	57	Qualified for 1989–90 European Cup
2	R.S.C. Anderlecht	34	22	9	3	83	36	+47	53	Qualified for 1989–90 European Cup Winners' Cup
3	R.F.C. de Liège	34	17	12	5	64	22	+42	46	Qualified for 1989–90 UEFA Cup
4	Club Brugge K.V.	34	17	9	8	67	44	+23	43	Qualified for 1989–90 UEFA Cup
5	Royal Antwerp FC	34	16	10	8	62	39	+23	42	Qualified for 1989–90 UEFA Cup
6	Standard Liège	34	14	8	12	46	43	+3	36	
7	K. Sint-Truidense V.V.	34	12	11	11	39	44	−5	35	
8	K.V. Kortrijk	34	9	17	8	53	44	+9	35	
9	K.S.V. Waregem	34	11	8	15	48	52	−4	30	
10	Lierse S.K.	34	10	9	15	29	46	−17	29	
11	R. Charleroi S.C.	34	6	17	11	31	49	−18	29	
12	K.S.K. Beveren	34	10	8	16	40	51	−11	28	
13	K.R.C. Mechelen	34	10	8	16	37	55	−18	28	
14	K.S.C. Lokeren Oost-Vlaanderen	34	9	10	15	44	57	−13	28	
15	Cercle Brugge K.S.V.	34	10	7	17	41	54	−13	27	
16	K. Beerschot V.A.C.	34	8	10	16	41	63	−22	26	
17	R.W.D. Molenbeek	34	10	5	19	36	59	−23	25	Relegated to Division II
18	K.R.C. Genk	34	2	11	21	20	67	−47	15	Relegated to Division II

== Results ==
Home \ Away	AND	ANT	BEE	BEV	CER	CHA	CLU	GNK	KOR	RCL	LIE	LOK	KVM	RCM	MOL	STV	STA	WAR
Anderlecht		1–1	3–3	2–0	4–2	2–0	1–0	6–1	2–2	1–0	4–2	5–1	0–0	6–3	4–1	2–2	2–0	2–0
Antwerp	2–1		4–1	2–2	3–0	5–0	1–2	4–0	0–0	2–2	1–2	4–1	0–2	2–1	0–1	0–1	2–0	1–1
Beerschot	1–4	5–1		3–1	1–0	0–2	0–0	4–2	1–1	1–0	0–1	2–2	1–3	2–0	1–3	1–0	1–1	1–1
Beveren	2–4	1–1	0–0		2–0	1–1	3–2	2–1	4–2	0–0	2–2	0–3	1–1	3–0	0–1	2–1	1–0	1–2
Cercle Brugge	1–3	1–2	3–1	0–1		2–0	3–1	2–2	2–0	1–1	0–1	2–2	0–2	0–0	2–0	2–1	2–0	3–0
Charleroi	0–0	1–4	2–2	2–0	1–2		1–1	0–0	2–1	1–1	1–1	0–0	1–3	2–2	0–0	0–0	0–0	3–0
Club Brugge	1–1	3–1	1–0	3–1	4–2	6–1		3–0	1–1	2–2	3–1	2–2	0–1	2–0	4–3	4–0	2–0	2–3
Genk	0–3	1–1	2–2	1–0	1–1	0–2	0–1		0–2	0–1	0–0	2–1	1–1	1–1	0–0	0–1	1–2	0–1
Kortrijk	2–0	1–2	0–0	1–1	3–1	2–2	3–4	6–2		0–0	4–1	1–1	0–0	1–1	3–1	2–2	3–1	2–0
Liège	2–0	0–1	6–1	1–0	4–0	3–0	0–0	2–1	1–1		0–1	2–0	1–1	7–1	1–1	4–0	1–0	3–1
Lierse	1–4	0–1	3–0	0–2	1–1	1–1	0–3	1–0	1–1	1–4		1–2	0–2	0–1	3–1	1–1	0–3	0–0
Lokeren	2–4	2–2	4–0	3–0	2–1	1–1	1–2	0–0	0–0	0–3	0–1		0–3	2–3	1–1	4–2	0–2	2–1
KV Mechelen	1–2	2–1	4–3	2–1	4–0	3–0	1–0	2–0	3–1	1–0	1–0	2–1		3–0	2–0	3–0	2–0	0–0
K.R.C. Mechelen	0–4	0–2	1–0	1–3	0–1	2–0	1–1	4–0	0–0	1–1	1–0	3–0	0–1		2–0	1–3	1–3	2–2
Molenbeek	0–2	0–2	3–0	3–2	2–1	2–1	1–4	3–0	1–0	1–3	0–1	1–2	0–4	1–0		1–2	2–2	1–4
Sint-Truiden	1–1	0–0	2–1	1–0	2–1	0–0	5–1	0–0	3–1	0–4	0–0	1–0	0–0	0–2	3–0		3–1	2–2
Standard Liège	2–2	3–3	2–0	1–0	1–0	1–1	0–0	5–0	2–2	0–3	2–0	2–0	3–4	2–1	2–1	1–0		2–1
Waregem	0–1	1–4	1–2	4–1	2–2	1–2	4–2	3–1	2–5	1–1	0–1	1–2	3–0	0–1	1–0	3–0	2–0	

Legend: Blue = home team win; Yellow = draw; Red = away team win.

== Topscorers ==
Scorer	Goals	Team
(Australia) Eddie Krnčević	23	R.S.C. Anderlecht
(Socialist Federal Republic of Yugoslavia) Zvonko Varga	22	R.F.C. de Liège
(Belgium) Luc Nilis	19	R.S.C. Anderlecht
(Netherlands) John Bosman	18	KV Mechelen
(Belgium) Patrick Goots	17	K. Beerschot V.A.C.
(Belgium) Eddy Snelders	17	K.V. Kortrijk
(Netherlands) Eric Viscaal	17	K.S.K. Beveren
(Belgium) Patrick Versavel	16	K.S.C. Lokeren Oost-Vlaanderen
(Socialist Federal Republic of Yugoslavia) Josip Weber	15	Cercle Brugge K.S.V.
(Belgium) Marc Van Der Linden	15	Royal Antwerp F.C.
(Belgium) Hans Christiaens	14	K.S.V. Waregem
(Israel) Ronny Rosenthal	14	Standard Liège
(Belgium) Marc De Buyser	14	R.W.D. Molenbeek
(Belgium) Daniel Veyt	14	R.F.C. de Liège

== Attendances ==
#	Club	Average
1	Anderlecht	15,059
2	Charleroi	11,618
3	Club Brugge	11,559
4	Standard	11,353
5	Liège	10,735
6	KV Mechelen	10,706
7	STVV	9,471
8	Antwerp	8,818
9	Lierse	7,676
10	Kortrijk	6,512
11	Genk	6,479
12	Beveren	5,735
13	Beerschot	5,412
14	Lokeren	5,265
15	RWDM	5,147
16	Waregem	4,882
17	Cercle	4,176
18	KRC Mechelen	4,100
