= 1987–88 in Swiss football =

Football in Switzerland
- Season: 1987–88

Men's football
- Nationalliga A: Xamax
- Nationalliga B: No team was declared as champion
- 1. Liga: Overall champions FC Emmenbrücke; Group 1: Urania Genève Sport; Group 2: SV Lyss; Group 3: FC Emmenbrücke; Group 4: FC Glarus
- Swiss Cup: Grasshopper Club

Women's football
- Swiss Women's Super League: SV Seebach Zürich
- Swiss Cup: SV Seebach Zürich

The following is a summary of the 1987–88 season of competitive football in Switzerland.

== Nationalliga A ==
=== Qualification phase ===
Pos	Team	Pld	W	D	L	GF	GA	GD	Pts	Qualification
1	Xamax	22	13	5	4	53	28	+25	44	Advance to championship round halved points (rounded up) as bonus
2	Grasshopper Club	22	12	6	4	30	16	+14	42	Advance to championship round halved points (rounded up) as bonus
3	Young Boys	22	7	12	3	37	28	+9	33	Advance to championship round halved points (rounded up) as bonus
4	Aarau	22	9	7	6	28	24	+4	34	Advance to championship round halved points (rounded up) as bonus
5	St. Gallen	22	9	5	8	28	27	+1	32	Advance to championship round halved points (rounded up) as bonus
6	Luzern	22	7	9	6	30	29	+1	30	Advance to championship round halved points (rounded up) as bonus
7	Servette	22	8	7	7	32	31	+1	31	Advance to championship round halved points (rounded up) as bonus
8	Lausanne-Sport	22	8	7	7	39	39	0	31	Advance to championship round halved points (rounded up) as bonus
9	Sion	22	8	6	8	42	36	+6	30	Continue to promotion/relegation round
10	Bellinzona	22	3	8	11	25	38	−13	17	Continue to promotion/relegation round
11	Basel	22	4	5	13	27	55	−28	17	Continue to promotion/relegation round
12	Zürich	22	4	3	15	26	46	−20	15	Continue to promotion/relegation round

Source: rsssf.com
Rules for classification: 1) Points; 2) Goal difference; 3) Goals scored; 4) Head-to-head points; 5) Away goals scored; 6) Draw.

=== Championship group ===
The first eight teams of the qualification phase competed in the Championship round. The teams took half of the points (rounded up to complete units) gained in the qualification as bonus with them.

Pos	Team	Pld	W	D	L	GF	GA	GD	BP	Pts	Qualification
1	Xamax	14	6	4	4	29	19	+10	16	32	Swiss champions, qualified for 1988–89 European Cup
2	Servette	14	7	4	3	38	23	+15	12	30	Qualified for 1988–89 UEFA Cup
3	Aarau	14	6	5	3	24	17	+7	13	30	Qualified for 1988–89 UEFA Cup and entered 1988 Intertoto Cup
4	Grasshopper Club	14	6	3	5	23	21	+2	15	30	Swiss Cup winners, qualified for 1988–89 Cup Winners' Cup and entered 1988 Intertoto Cup
5	Luzern	14	5	5	4	19	19	0	12	27	Entered 1989 Intertoto Cup
6	St. Gallen	14	4	3	7	16	25	−9	12	23	
7	Lausanne-Sport	14	3	5	6	18	30	−12	12	23	
8	Young Boys	14	4	1	9	18	31	−13	13	22	Entered 1989 Intertoto Cup

Source: rsssf.com
Rules for classification: 1) Points; 2) Goal difference; 3) Goals scored; 4) Head-to-head points; 5) Away goals scored; 6) Draw.

== Nationalliga B ==
=== Qualification phase ===
Group East

Pos	Team	Pld	W	D	L	GF	GA	GD	Pts	Qualification
1	Lugano	22	16	3	3	74	28	+46	51	Advance to promotion round
2	FC Wettingen	22	15	3	4	53	16	+37	48	Advance to promotion round
3	FC Locarno	22	14	5	3	47	29	+18	47	Advance to promotion round
4	FC Schaffhausen	22	11	5	6	48	31	+17	38	Advance to promotion round
5	FC Chiasso	22	10	7	5	34	28	+6	37	Advance to promotion round
6	BSC Old Boys	22	10	3	9	35	36	−1	33	Advance to promotion round
7	SC Zug	22	8	4	10	32	40	−8	28	Continue in relegation round
8	FC Winterthur	22	6	8	8	28	44	−16	26	Continue in relegation round
9	FC Chur	22	5	6	11	27	39	−12	21	Continue in relegation round
10	FC Olten	22	3	5	14	24	52	−28	14	Continue in relegation round
11	FC Solothurn	22	3	4	15	26	56	−30	13	Continue in relegation round
12	FC Baden	22	3	3	16	23	52	−29	12	Continue in relegation round

Source: rsssf.com
Rules for classification: 1) Points; 2) Goal difference; 3) Goals scored; 4) Head-to-head points; 5) Away goals scored; 6) Draw.

Group East

Pos	Team	Pld	W	D	L	GF	GA	GD	Pts	Qualification
1	Etoile Carouge FC	22	14	2	6	54	34	+20	44	Advance to promotion round
2	FC Grenchen	22	12	5	5	56	25	+31	41	Advance to promotion round
3	FC Bulle	22	13	3	6	43	29	+14	42	Advance to promotion round
4	CS Chênois	22	11	6	5	45	29	+16	39	Advance to promotion round
5	ES FC Malley	22	11	5	6	50	35	+15	38	Advance to promotion round
6	FC Martigny-Sports	22	8	8	6	29	31	−2	32	Advance to promotion round
7	Yverdon-Sport FC	22	10	4	8	36	43	−7	34	Continue in relegation round
8	FC Biel-Bienne	22	5	9	8	38	48	−10	24	Continue in relegation round
9	Vevey Sports	22	6	4	12	34	53	−19	22	Continue in relegation round
10	FC Renens	22	4	6	12	34	47	−13	18	Continue in relegation round
11	FC Montreux-Sports	22	4	5	13	27	49	−22	17	Continue in relegation round
12	FC La Chaux-de-Fonds	22	5	1	16	24	47	−23	16	Continue in relegation round

Source: rsssf.com
Rules for classification: 1) Points; 2) Goal difference; 3) Goals scored; 4) Head-to-head points; 5) Away goals scored; 6) Draw.

=== Promotion/relegation round ===
Group A

Pos	Team	Pld	W	D	L	GF	GA	GD	Pts	Qualification
1	Wettingen	14	11	0	3	32	16	+16	22	Promotion to Nationalliga A 1988–89
2	Bellinzona	14	8	1	5	29	20	+9	17	Remain in Nationalliga A 1988–89
3	FC Schaffhausen	14	7	1	6	25	22	+3	15	Remain in Nationalliga B 1988–89
4	ES Malley	14	7	1	6	21	20	+1	15	Remain in Nationalliga B 1988–89
5	Basel	14	5	4	5	27	20	+7	14	Relegation to Nationalliga B1988–89
6	Bulle	14	7	0	7	28	25	+3	14	Remain in Nationalliga B 1988–89
7	Etoile Carouge	14	4	1	9	14	33	−19	9	Remain in Nationalliga B 1988–89
8	Old Boys	14	2	2	10	11	31	−20	6	Remain in Nationalliga B 1988–89

Source: rsssf.com
Rules for classification: 1) Points; 2) Goal difference; 3) Goals scored; 4) Head-to-head points; 5) Away goals scored; 6) Draw.

Group B

Pos	Team	Pld	W	D	L	GF	GA	GD	Pts	Qualification
1	Lugano	14	13	0	1	47	15	+32	26	Promotion to Nationalliga A 1988–89
2	Sion	14	11	1	2	49	14	+35	23	Remain in Nationalliga A 1988–89
3	Grenchen	14	7	1	6	27	24	+3	15	Remain in Nationalliga B 1988–89
4	Chênois	14	6	2	6	21	30	−9	14	Remain in Nationalliga B 1988–89
5	Chiasso	14	5	1	8	21	34	−13	11	Remain in Nationalliga B 1988–89
6	Zürich	14	4	1	9	24	34	−10	9	Relegation to Nationalliga B 1988–89
7	Martigny-Sports	14	3	2	9	16	37	−21	8	Remain in Nationalliga B 1988–89
8	Locarno	14	1	4	9	16	33	−17	6	Remain in Nationalliga B 1988–89

Source: rsssf.com
Rules for classification: 1) Points; 2) Goal difference; 3) Goals scored; 4) Head-to-head points; 5) Away goals scored; 6) Draw.

=== Relegation round NLB/1. Liga ===
The last six teams in each of the two qualification phase groups competed in two relegation groups against relegation to the 1. Liga 1991–92. There was to be one direct relegation in each group, plus a play-out against relegation between both second last placed teams.

Group A

Pos	Team	Pld	W	D	L	GF	GA	GD	Pts	Qualification
1	FC La Chaux-de-Fonds	10	6	3	1	15	11	+4	15	Remain in NLB 1989–90
2	SC Zug	10	4	2	4	17	12	+5	10	Remain in NLB 1989–90
3	FC Biel-Bienne	10	4	2	4	11	11	0	10	Remain in NLB 1989–90
4	FC Chur	10	1	7	2	7	8	−1	9	Remain in NLB 1989–90
5	FC Renens	10	3	2	5	12	15	−3	8	Play-out against relegation
6	FC Solothurn	10	3	2	5	11	16	−5	8	Relegated to 1989–90 1. Liga

Source: rsssf.com
Rules for classification: 1) Points; 2) Goal difference; 3) Goals scored; 4) Head-to-head points; 5) Away goals scored; 6) Draw.

Group B

Pos	Team	Pld	W	D	L	GF	GA	GD	Pts	Qualification
1	Yverdon-Sport FC	10	4	4	2	19	12	+7	12	Remain in NLB 1989–90
2	FC Winterthur	10	4	3	3	14	10	+4	11	Remain in NLB 1989–90
3	FC Baden	10	3	4	3	17	15	+2	10	Remain in NLB 1989–90
4	FC Montreux-Sports	10	4	2	4	10	11	−1	10	Remain in NLB 1989–90
5	Vevey Sports	10	3	3	4	12	13	−1	9	Play-out against relegation
6	FC Olten	10	2	4	4	12	23	−11	8	Relegated to 1989–90 1. Liga

Source: rsssf.com
Rules for classification: 1) Points; 2) Goal difference; 3) Goals scored; 4) Head-to-head points; 5) Away goals scored; 6) Draw.

=== Decider against relegation ===
The decider was played on in .

Team 1	Score	Team 2
FC Renens	1–1	Vevey Sports
Vevey Sports	1–3	FC Renens

FC Renens win and remain in the division. Vevey Sports are relegated to 1989–90 1. Liga.

== 1. Liga ==
=== Group 1 ===
Pos	Team	Pld	W	D	L	GF	GA	GD	Pts	Qualification or relegation
1	Urania Genève Sport	26	17	4	5	60	32	+28	38	Play-off to Nationalliga B
2	FC Châtel-Saint-Denis	28	15	8	5	52	32	+20	38	Play-off to Nationalliga B
3	FC Raron	26	11	10	5	34	26	+8	32	
4	FC Echallens	26	12	5	9	50	39	+11	29	
5	FC Le Locle	26	10	7	9	35	37	−2	27	
6	FC Stade Lausanne	26	9	9	8	25	28	−3	27	
7	FC Aigle	26	8	9	9	35	34	+1	25	
8	Concordia/Folgore Lausanne	19	9	0	10	29	29	0	18	
9	FC Colombier	26	9	6	11	36	37	−1	24	
10	FC Monthey	26	6	11	9	35	37	−2	23	
11	Grand-Lancy FC	26	7	9	10	30	32	−2	23	
12	FC Boudry	26	8	7	11	34	50	−16	23	Play-out against relegation
13	FC Leytron	26	7	4	15	29	47	−18	18	Relegation to 2. Liga Interregional
14	FC Vernier	25	4	5	16	33	57	−24	13	Relegation to 2. Liga Interregional

Source: RSSSF
Rules for classification: 1) Points; 2) Goal difference within the league, but decider play-off for qualifiers.

=== Group 2 ===
Pos	Team	Pld	W	D	L	GF	GA	GD	Pts	Qualification or relegation
1	SV Lyss	26	13	10	3	43	20	+23	36	Play-off to Nationalliga B
2	FC Thun	26	14	7	5	68	36	+32	35	Play-off to Nationalliga B
3	FC Laufen	26	7	16	3	37	27	+10	30	
4	SC Burgdorf	26	10	7	9	47	44	+3	27	
5	FC Rapid Ostermundigen	26	8	11	7	43	49	−6	27	
6	FC Bern	26	9	8	9	36	37	−1	26	
7	Central Fribourg	26	7	11	8	36	55	−19	25	
8	FC Breitenbach	26	11	2	13	50	39	+11	24	
9	FC Moutier	26	8	8	10	48	47	+1	24	
10	SR Delémont	26	8	7	11	57	65	−8	23	
11	FC Fribourg	26	8	7	11	47	49	−2	23	
12	FC Dürrenast	26	6	10	10	37	46	−9	22	Decider for twelfth place
13	FC Köniz	26	8	6	12	34	50	−16	22	Decider for twelfth place
14	SC Baudepartement Basel	26	6	8	12	37	49	−12	20	Relegation to 2. Liga Interregional

Source: RSSSF
Rules for classification: 1) Points; 2) Goal difference within the league, but decider play-off for qualifiers.

==== Decider for twelfth position ====
The play-out match for twelfth position was played on 24 May 1988 in Stadion Neumatt in Burgdorf.

Team 1	Score	Team 2
FC Dürrenast	0–1	FC Köniz

FC Köniz win and continued in the play-outs. FC Dürrenast are directly relegated to 2. Liga Interregional.

=== Group 3 ===
Pos	Team	Pld	W	D	L	GF	GA	GD	Pts	Qualification or relegation
1	FC Emmenbrücke	26	14	8	4	54	18	+36	36	Play-off to Nationalliga B
2	SC Buochs	26	13	10	3	52	29	+23	36	To decider for second place
3	FC Suhr	26	14	8	4	41	23	+18	36	To decider for second place
4	SC Kriens	26	13	8	5	47	26	+21	34	
5	FC Einsiedeln	26	11	7	8	57	48	+9	29	
6	FC Zug	26	11	6	9	39	32	+7	28	
7	FC Ascona	26	10	7	9	34	39	−5	27	
8	FC Muri	26	8	9	9	33	33	0	25	
9	FC Klus-Balsthal	26	9	7	10	32	40	−8	25	
10	FC Mendrisio	26	7	10	9	32	32	0	24	
11	FC Tresa/Monteggio	26	7	7	12	30	39	−9	21	
12	FC Altdorf (Uri)	26	6	8	12	32	52	−20	20	Play-out against relegation
13	FC Sursee	26	5	5	16	41	64	−23	15	Relegation to 2. Liga Interregional
14	SC Goldau	26	3	2	21	25	74	−49	8	Relegation to 2. Liga Interregional

Source: RSSSF
Rules for classification: 1) Points; 2) Goal difference within the league, but decider play-off for qualifiers.

==== Decider for second position ====
Team 1	Score	Team 2
FC Suhr	1–2	SC Buochs

SC Buochs win and advance to play-offs.

=== Group 4 ===
Pos	Team	Pld	W	D	L	GF	GA	GD	Pts	Qualification or relegation
1	FC Glarus	26	13	11	2	32	12	+20	37	Play-off to Nationalliga B
2	FC Herisau	26	11	9	6	35	30	+5	31	To decider for second place
3	FC Rorschach	26	12	7	7	30	28	+2	31	To decider for second place
4	FC Vaduz	26	12	6	8	47	26	+21	30	
5	FC Kilchberg	26	11	7	8	35	35	0	29	
6	FC Altstätten (St. Gallen)	26	10	8	8	43	34	+9	28	
7	FC Red Star Zürich	26	9	9	8	30	29	+1	27	
8	FC Tuggen	26	9	8	9	41	33	+8	26	
9	FC Brüttisellen	26	8	9	9	38	34	+4	25	
10	FC Frauenfeld	26	9	6	11	28	42	−14	24	
11	FC Stäfa	26	7	8	11	36	49	−13	22	
12	FC Küsnacht	26	4	12	10	24	28	−4	20	Decider for twelfth place
13	FC Dübendorf	26	7	6	13	29	41	−12	20	Decider for twelfth place
14	FC Embrach	26	2	10	14	14	41	−27	14	Relegation to 2. Liga Interregional

Source: RSSSF
Rules for classification: 1) Points; 2) Goal difference within the league, but decider play-off for qualifiers.

==== Decider for second place ====
The decider was played on 24 May 1988 in St. Gallen

Team 1	Score	Team 2
FC Rorschach	2–2	FC Herisau

FC Rorschach win and advance to play-offs.

==== Decider for twelfth place ====
The decider was played on 24 May 1988 in Kilchberg

Team 1	Score	Team 2
FC Dübendorf	3–2	FC Küsnacht

FC Dübendorf win and continued in the play-outs. FC Küsnacht are relegated directly to 2. Liga Interregional.

=== Promotion play-off ===
==== Qualification round ====
Team 1	Score	Team 2
FC Thun	4–4	FC Emmenbrücke
FC Emmenbrücke	4–1	FC Thun

FC Emmenbrücke win 8–5 on aggregate and continue to the finals.

Team 1	Score	Team 2
Châtel-Saint-Denis	1–1	Glarus
Glarus	3–0	Châtel-Saint-Denis

Glarus win 4–1 on aggregate and continue to the finals.

Team 1	Score	Team 2
Urania Genève Sport	5–1	SC Buochs
SC Buochs	1–1	Urania Genève Sport

Urania Genève Sport win 6–2 on aggregate and continue to the finals.

Team 1	Score	Team 2
FC Rorschach	2–0	SV Lyss
SV Lyss	2–1	FC Rorschach

FC Rorschach win 3–2 on aggregate and continue to the finals.

==== Final round ====
Team 1	Score	Team 2
Urania Genève Sport	0–0	Glarus
Glarus	1–2	Urania Genève Sport

Urania Genève Sport win 2–1 on aggregate and are promoted to 1988–89 Nationalliga B.

Team 1	Score	Team 2
FC Emmenbrücke	1–0	FC Rorschach
FC Rorschach	2–1	FC Emmenbrücke

FC Emmenbrücke win on away goals and are promoted to 1988–89 Nationalliga B.

==== Decider for third place ====
The play-offs for the third promotion place was played on 25 June and on 2 July.

Team 1	Score	Team 2
Glarus	3–1	FC Rorschach
FC Rorschach	1–5	Glarus

Glarus win 8–2 on aggregate and are promoted to 1988–89 Nationalliga B.

==== Decider for championship ====
The play-off for the championship should have taken place on 25 June.

Team 1	Score	Team 2
FC Emmenbrücke	not played	Urania Genève Sport

Urania Genève Sport rejected the offer to play a championship final, thus FC Emmenbrücke were declared as 1. Liga champions for the 1987–88 season.

=== Relegation play-out ===
==== First round ====
Team 1	Score	Team 2
FC Altdorf	3–1	FC Dübendorf

continue to the final.

Team 1	Score	Team 2
FC Boudry	4–1	FC Köniz

continue to the final.

==== Final round ====
Team 1	Score	Team 2
FC Köniz	2–0	FC Dübendorf
FC Dübendorf	1–2	FC Köniz

FC Köniz win 4–1 on aggregate. FC Dübendorf are relegated to 2. Liga.

== Swiss Cup ==
=== Early rounds ===
The routes of the finalists to the final, played on Whit Monday 23 May 1988 at the Wankdorf in Bern:

Round 3

Team 1	Score	Team 2
18 October 1987
FC Bütschwil	0–6	Grasshopper Club
13 March 1988
FC Schaffhausen	4–0	AC Bellinzona

Round 4

Team 1	Score	Team 2
13 March 1988
Grasshopper Club	2–0	FC Wettingen
27 March 1988
FC Schaffhausen	1–0	FC Baden

Round 5

Team 1	Score	Team 2
26 March 1988
Grasshopper Club	1–1 (a.e.t.) (p. 2–1)	Servette FC
9 April 1988
FC Schaffhausen	2–0 (a.e.t.)	FC Echallens

Quarter-finals

Team 1	Score	Team 2
19 April 1988
FC Zürich	1–2	Grasshopper Club
26 April 1988
FC Schaffhausen	2–1 (a.e.t.)	FC St. Gallen

Semi-finals

Team 1	Score	Team 2
10 May 1988
Étoile-Carouge FC	1–2 (a.e.t.)	Grasshopper Club
BSC Young Boys	0–1	FC Schaffhausen

=== Final ===
23 May 1988
15:00

Grasshopper Club	2 – 0	FC Schaffhausen
Matthey 31'; In-Albon (yellow card) 41'; César 56'	Report

Wankdorf, Bern
Attendance: 33,000
Referee: (Switzerland) Franz Gächter (Aarau)

The trophy was presented to GC captain Andy Egli by Federal Councilor Adolf Ogi.

== Swiss Clubs in Europe ==
- Xamax as 1986–87 Nationalliga A champions: 1987–88 European Cup
- Young Boys as 1986–87 Swiss Cup winners: 1987–88 Cup Winners' Cup
- Grasshopper Club as league runners-up: 1987–88 UEFA Cup and entered 1987 Intertoto Cup
- Sion as league third placed team: 1987–88 UEFA Cup
- Lausanne-Sport: entered 1987 Intertoto Cup
- Bellinzona: entered 1987 Intertoto Cup
- La Chaux-de-Fonds: entered 1987 Intertoto Cup

=== Xamax ===
==== European Cup ====
===== First round =====
16 September 1987 First leg	Neuchâtel Xamax (Switzerland)	5–0	(Finland) Kuusysi	Stade de la Maladière, Neuchâtel
20:00	Van der Gijp 9', 20', 75'; Hermann 31'; Sutter 50'	Report		Attendance: 12,200; Referee: René Bindels (Luxembourg)

30 September 1987 Second leg	Kuusysi (Finland)	2–1	(Switzerland) Neuchâtel Xamax	Lahti Stadium, Lahti
19:00	Lius 7'; Kousa 28'	Report	Van der Gijp 9'	Attendance: 2,218; Referee: Kurt Sørensen (Denmark)

Neuchâtel Xamax won 6–2 on aggregate.

===== Second round =====
21 October 1987 First leg	Neuchâtel Xamax (Switzerland)	2–1	(West Germany) Bayern Munich	Stade de la Maladière, Neuchâtel
20:30	Lüthi 28'; Sutter 51'	Report	Matthäus 47'	Attendance: 21,322; Referee: Egbert Mulder (Netherlands)

4 November 1987 Second leg	Bayern Munich (West Germany)	2–0	(Switzerland) Neuchâtel Xamax	Olympiastadion, Munich
20:00	Pflügler 88'; Wegmann 90'	Report		Attendance: 26,500; Referee: Valeri Butenko (Soviet Union)

Bayern Munich won 3–2 on aggregate.

=== Young Boys ===
==== Cup Winners' Cup ====
===== First round =====
16 September 1987 First leg	Dunajská Streda (Czechoslovakia)	2–1	(Switzerland) Young Boys	Mestský štadión, Dunajská Streda
	Mičinec 9'; Kašpar 37'	Report	Zuffi 22'	Attendance: 5,672; Referee: Ignace van Swieten (Netherlands)

30 September 1987 Second leg	Young Boys (Switzerland)	3–1	(Czechoslovakia) Dunajská Streda	Stadion Wankdorf, Bern
	Zuffi 63'; Weber 67'; Maissen 88'	Report	Majoros 78'	Attendance: 8,100; Referee: Wolf-Günter Wiesel (West Germany)

Young Boys won 4–3 on aggregate.

===== Second round =====
21 October 1987 First leg	Den Haag (Netherlands)	2–1	(Switzerland) Young Boys	Zuiderparkstadion, The Hague
	de Roode 3'; Boere 71'	Report	Zuffi 62'	Attendance: 9,337; Referee: Luigi Agnolin (Italy)

3 November 1987 Second leg	Young Boys (Switzerland)	1–0	(Netherlands) Den Haag	Stadion Wankdorf, Bern
	Fimian 66'	Report		Attendance: 6,400; Referee: Helmut Kohl (Austria)

2–2 on aggregate. Young Boys won on away goals.

===== Quarter-finals =====
9 March 1988 First leg	Young Boys (Switzerland)	0–1	(Netherlands) Ajax	Stadion Wankdorf, Bern
		Report	Bosman 44'	Attendance: 7,686; Referee: Emilio Soriano Aladrén (Spain)

16 March 1988 Second leg	Ajax (Netherlands)	1–0	(Switzerland) Young Boys	De Meer Stadion, Amsterdam
	Larsson 39'	Report		Attendance: 18,955; Referee: Valeri Butenko (Soviet Union)

Ajax won 2–0 on aggregate.

=== Grasshopper Club ===
==== UEFA Cup ====
===== First round =====
16 September 1987 First leg	Grasshopper Club (Switzerland)	0–4	(Soviet Union) Dynamo Moscow	Hardturm, Zürich
20:00		UEFA report	Borodyuk 23', 45' (pen.), 57'; Karatayev 79'	Attendance: 8,900; Referee: José Pérez Sánchez (Spain)

30 September 1987 Second leg	Dynamo Moscow (Soviet Union)	1–0	(Switzerland) Grasshopper Club	Central Dynamo Stadium, Moscow
17:00	Vasilyev 33'	UEFA report		Attendance: 16,300; Referee: Manfred Neuner (West Germany)

Dynamo Moscow won 5–0 on aggregate.

==== Intertoto Cup ====
===== Group 2 =====
Pos	Team	Pld	W	D	L	GF	GA	GD	Pts	MAL	GCZ	VID	B05
1	(Sweden) Malmö	6	3	1	2	12	5	+7	7	—	2–0	4–0	3–0
2	(Switzerland) Grasshopper Club	6	2	3	1	10	9	+1	7	2–2	—	3–3	3–1
3	(Hungary) Videoton	6	2	1	3	9	11	−2	5	1–0	0–1	—	4–1
4	(Czechoslovakia) Bohemians Prague	6	2	1	3	7	13	−6	5	2–1	1–1	2–1	—

Source: Pawel Mogielnicki's Page
Rules for classification: 1) Points; 2) Goal difference; 3) Goals scored; 4) Head-to-head points; 5) Away goals scored; 6) Draw.

=== Sion ===
==== UEFA Cup ====
===== First round =====
16 September 1987 First leg	Velež Mostar (Socialist Federal Republic of Yugoslavia)	5–0	(Switzerland) Sion	Stadion pod Bijelim Brijegom, Mostar
18:30	Tuce 17', 32', 37', 61' (pen.); Šišić 60'	UEFA report		Attendance: 22,000; Referee: Dušan Krchňák (Czechoslovakia)

30 September 1987 Second leg	Sion (Switzerland)	3–0	(Socialist Federal Republic of Yugoslavia) Velež Mostar	Stade de Tourbillon, Sion
20:00	Brigger 4'; Bouderbala 7'; Balet 22'	UEFA report		Attendance: 3,950; Referee: Alexis Ponnet (Belgium)

Velež Mostar won 5–3 on aggregate.

=== Lausanne-Sport ===
==== Intertoto Cup ====
===== Group 1 =====
Pos	Team	Pld	W	D	L	GF	GA	GD	Pts	JEN	AGF	VAS	LS
1	(East Germany) Carl Zeiss Jena	6	2	3	1	10	6	+4	7	—	2–2	2–2	3–0
2	(Denmark) AGF	6	2	3	1	8	7	+1	7	1–1	—	1–0	2–1
3	(Hungary) Vasas	6	2	1	3	10	11	−1	5	0–2	2–1	—	5–3
4	(Switzerland) Lausanne-Sport	6	2	1	3	8	12	−4	5	1–0	1–1	2–1	—

Source: Pawel Mogielnicki's Page
Rules for classification: 1) Points; 2) Goal difference; 3) Goals scored; 4) Head-to-head points; 5) Away goals scored; 6) Draw.

=== Bellinzona ===
==== Intertoto Cup ====
===== Group 4 =====
Pos	Team	Pld	W	D	L	GF	GA	GD	Pts	TAT	NÆS	BEL	DAC
1	(Hungary) Tatabánya	6	5	0	1	16	3	+13	10	—	3–1	2–0	6–1
2	(Denmark) Næstved	6	3	1	2	16	13	+3	7	0–4	—	7–0	3–2
3	(Switzerland) Bellinzona	6	2	0	4	5	16	−11	4	1–0	2–3	—	2–0
4	(Czechoslovakia) DAC Dunajská Streda	6	1	1	4	9	14	−5	3	0–1	2–2	4–0	—

Source: Pawel Mogielnicki's Page
Rules for classification: 1) Points; 2) Goal difference; 3) Goals scored; 4) Head-to-head points; 5) Away goals scored; 6) Draw.

=== La Chaux-de-Fonds ===
==== Intertoto Cup ====
===== Group 2 =====
Pos	Team	Pld	W	D	L	GF	GA	GD	Pts	PSZ	MAG	HAM	CDF
1	(Poland) Pogoń Szczecin	6	5	0	1	20	8	+12	10	—	3–1	3–0	6–3
2	(East Germany) Magdeburg	6	3	1	2	9	6	+3	7	2–1	—	0–0	5–1
3	(Sweden) Hammarby	6	3	1	2	8	8	0	7	2–3	1–0	—	2–1
4	(Switzerland) La Chaux-de-Fonds	6	0	0	6	6	21	−15	0	0–4	0–1	1–3	—

Source: Pawel Mogielnicki's Page
Rules for classification: 1) Points; 2) Goal difference; 3) Goals scored; 4) Head-to-head points; 5) Away goals scored; 6) Draw.

== Sources ==
- Switzerland 1987–88 at RSSSF
- Cup finals at Fussball-Schweiz
- Intertoto history at Pawel Mogielnicki's Page
- Josef Zindel (2018). FC Basel 1893. Die ersten 125 Jahre (in German). Basel: Friedrich Reinhardt Verlag. ISBN 978-3-7245-2305-5.

Preceded by 1986–87	Seasons in Swiss football	Succeeded by 1988–89
