= 1987 Belgian Cup final =

- Event: 1986–87 Belgian Cup
Mechelen	RFC Liège
1	0
- Date: 14 June 1987
- Venue: Constant Vanden Stock Stadium, Anderlecht, Brussels
- Referee: Frans Van Den Wijngaert
- Attendance: 26,117

The 1987 Belgian Cup final, took place on 14 June 1987 between Mechelen and RFC Liège. It was the 32nd Belgian Cup final. Mechelen won the match with 1–0.

== Route to the final ==
Mechelen				RFC Liège
Opponent	Result	Legs	Round	Opponent	Result	Legs
Seraing	3–0	3–0 home; 0–0 away	Last 16	Club Brugge	3–2	2–1 home; 1–1 away
Beveren	2–1	2–1 home; 0–0 away	Quarter-finals	Anderlecht	2–1	1–0 away; 1–1 home
Winterslag	4–0	1–0 away; 3–0 home	Semi-finals	Cercle Brugge	3–2	1–2 away; 2–0 home

== Match ==
=== Details ===
14 June 1987
16:00 CET

Mechelen	1–0	RFC Liège
Den Boer 30'

Constant Vanden Stock Stadium, Anderlecht, Brussels
Attendance: 26,117
Referee: Frans Van Den Wijngaert

Mechelen	RFC Liège

GK	(Belgium) Michel Preud'homme
RB	(Belgium) Albert Cluytens (c)
CB	(Belgium) Karel Kesselaers	Booked
CB	(Netherlands) Graeme Rutjes
LB	(Belgium) Geert Deferm
RM	(Netherlands) Wim Hofkens
MF	(Germany) Joachim Benfeld
MF	(Netherlands) Erwin Koeman
LM	(Belgium) Paul De Mesmaeker		(substituted off) 88'
FW	(Netherlands) Piet den Boer
FW	(Belgium) Koen Wijns		(substituted off) 59'
Substitutes:
CB	(Belgium) Lei Clijsters	Booked	(substituted on) 59'
FW	(Belgium) Ronny Martens		(substituted on) 88'
Manager:
(Netherlands) Aad de Mos

GK	(Belgium) Pierre Drouguet
RB	(Belgium) Bernard Wegria
CB	(Belgium) Moreno Giusto
CB	(Belgium) Jean-François De Sart (c)	(yellow card)
LB	(Belgium) Raphaël Quaranta
RM	(Belgium) Guy François
CM	(Belgium) Didier Quain	Booked
CM	(Belgium) Vincent Machiels
LM	(Belgium) Frédéric Waseige		(substituted off) 82'
FW	(Socialist Federal Republic of Yugoslavia) Zvonko Varga	Booked
FW	(Belgium) Luc Ernes
Substitutes:
MF	(Belgium) Jean-Marie Houben		(substituted on) 82'
Manager:
(Belgium) Robert Waseige

Match rules

- 90 minutes.
- 30 minutes of extra time if necessary.
- Penalty shoot-out if scores still level.
- Maximum of three substitutions.
