= 1988 European Cup Winners' Cup final =

Football match between Belgium and the Netherlands

- Match programme cover
- Event: 1987–88 European Cup Winners' Cup
KV Mechelen	Ajax
(Belgium)	(Netherlands)
1	0
- Date: 11 May 1988
- Venue: Stade de la Meinau, Strasbourg
- Referee: Dieter Pauly (West Germany)
- Attendance: 39,446

The 1988 European Cup Winners' Cup Final was a football match contested between KV Mechelen of Belgium and the defending champions, Ajax of the Netherlands. It was the final match of the 1987–88 European Cup Winners' Cup and the 28th European Cup Winners' Cup final. The final was played at Stade de la Meinau in Strasbourg, France, on 11 May 1988. Mechelen won the match 1–0 thanks to a goal by Piet den Boer who headed the ball low into the net after a cross by Eli Ohana from the left.

== Route to the final ==
(Belgium) KV Mechelen				Round	(Netherlands) Ajax			
Opponent	Agg.	1st leg	2nd leg		Opponent	Agg.	1st leg	2nd leg
(Romania) Dinamo București	3–0	1–0 (H)	2–0 (A)	First round	(Republic of Ireland) Dundalk	6–0	4–0 (H)	2–0 (A)
(Scotland) St Mirren	2–0	0–0 (H)	2–0 (A)	Second round	(West Germany) Hamburger SV	3–0	1–0 (A)	2–0 (H)
(Soviet Union) Dinamo Minsk	2–1	1–0 (H)	1–1 (A)	Quarter-finals	(Switzerland) Young Boys	2–0	1–0 (A)	1–0 (H)
(Italy) Atalanta	4–2	2–1 (H)	2–1 (A)	Semi-finals	(France) Marseille	4–2	3–0 (A)	1–2 (H)

== Match ==
=== Details ===
11 May 1988
20:15 CEST

KV Mechelen (Belgium)	1–0	(Netherlands) Ajax
Den Boer 53'	Report

Stade de la Meinau, Strasbourg
Attendance: 39,446
Referee: Dieter Pauly (West Germany)

Mechelen	Ajax

GK	1	(Belgium) Michel Preud'homme
RB	6	(Belgium) Koen Sanders	(yellow card) 61'
CB	3	(Belgium) Lei Clijsters (c)
CB	4	(Netherlands) Graeme Rutjes
LB	9	(Belgium) Geert Deferm
RM	5	(Netherlands) Wim Hofkens		(substituted off) 73'
CM	2	(Belgium) Marc Emmers
LM	8	(Netherlands) Erwin Koeman
RW	7	(Belgium) Pascal De Wilde		(substituted off) 60'
LW	10	(Israel) Eli Ohana
CF	11	(Netherlands) Piet den Boer	(yellow card) 81'
Substitutes:
GK		(Belgium) Pierre Drouguet
DF	14	(Belgium) Raymond Jaspers
MF	15	(Belgium) Paul Theunis		(substituted on) 73'
FW	16	(Belgium) Paul De Mesmaeker		(substituted on) 60'
MF	17	(West Germany) Joachim Benfeld
Manager:
(Netherlands) Aad de Mos

GK	1	(Netherlands) Stanley Menzo
RB	2	(Netherlands) Danny Blind	(red card) 16'
CB	3	(Netherlands) Jan Wouters	(yellow card) 90'
CB	5	(Netherlands) Frank Verlaat		(substituted off) 73'
LB	4	(Sweden) Peter Larsson
RM	8	(Netherlands) Aron Winter
CM	6	(Netherlands) Arnold Scholten
LM	10	(Netherlands) Arnold Mühren
RW	7	(Netherlands) John van 't Schip (c)		(substituted off) 57'
LW	11	(Netherlands) Rob Witschge
CF	9	(Netherlands) John Bosman
Substitutes:
GK		(Netherlands) Lloyd Doesburg
FW	13	(Netherlands) Henny Meijer		(substituted on) 73'
MF	14	(Netherlands) Richard Witschge
MF		(Scotland) Ally Dick
FW	16	(Netherlands) Dennis Bergkamp		(substituted on) 57'
Manager:
(Netherlands) Barry Hulshoff

Assistant referees:
Karl-Heinz Tritschler (West Germany)
Aron Schmidhuber (West Germany)

Match rules

- 90 minutes
- 30 minutes of extra time if necessary
- Penalty shoot-out if scores still level
- Five named substitutes
- Maximum of two substitutions

== See also ==
- 1987–88 European Cup Winners' Cup
- 1988 European Cup Final
- 1988 UEFA Cup Final
- AFC Ajax in European football
