= 1986–87 in Swiss football =

Football in Switzerland
- Season: 1986–87

Men's football
- Nationalliga A: Xamax
- Nationalliga B: FC Grenchen
- 1. Liga: Group 1: FC Montreux-Sports; Group 2: BSC Old Boys; Group 3: FC Solothurn; Group 4: FC Altstätten (St. Gallen)
- Swiss Cup: Young Boys

Women's football
- Swiss Women's Super League: SV Seebach Zürich
- Swiss Cup: SV Seebach Zürich

The following is a summary of the 1986–87 season of competitive football in Switzerland.

== Nationalliga A ==
=== Final league table ===
Pos	Team	Pld	W	D	L	GF	GA	GD	Pts	Qualification
1	Xamax	30	21	6	3	75	27	+48	48	Swiss champions qualified for 1987–88 European Cup
2	Grasshopper Club	30	19	5	6	60	36	+24	43	qualified for 1987–88 UEFA Cup and entered 1987 Intertoto Cup
3	Sion	30	17	8	5	76	38	+38	42	qualified for 1987–88 UEFA Cup
4	Servette	30	16	4	10	65	44	+21	36	
5	Luzern	30	12	12	6	55	38	+17	36	
6	Zürich	30	12	12	6	52	44	+8	36	
7	St. Gallen	30	14	6	10	50	43	+7	34	
8	Lausanne-Sport	30	13	6	11	64	60	+4	32	entered 1987 Intertoto Cup
9	Bellinzona	30	10	11	9	42	39	+3	31	entered 1987 Intertoto Cup
10	Young Boys	30	10	8	12	47	45	+2	28	Swiss Cup winners qualified for 1987–88 Cup Winners' Cup
11	Aarau	30	9	8	13	37	42	−5	26	To Promotion/relegation play-off NLA/NLB
12	Basel	30	9	6	15	49	62	−13	24	To Promotion/relegation play-off NLA/NLB
13	Vevey Sports	30	6	8	16	31	72	−41	20	To Promotion/relegation play-off NLA/NLB
14	Wettingen	30	6	7	17	31	48	−17	19	To Promotion/relegation play-off NLA/NLB
15	Locarno	30	6	7	17	44	65	−21	19	Relegated to 1987–88 Nationalliga B
16	La Chaux-de-Fonds	30	1	4	25	22	97	−75	6	Relegated to 1987–88 Nationalliga B and entered 1987 Intertoto Cup

Source: rsssf.com
Rules for classification: 1) Points; 2) Goal difference; 3) Goals scored; 4) Head-to-head points; 5) Away goals scored; 6) Draw.

== Nationalliga B ==
=== Final league table ===
Pos	Team	Pld	W	D	L	GF	GA	GD	Pts	Qualification
1	FC Grenchen	30	20	7	3	79	30	+49	47	NLB champions qualified promotion/relegation NLA/NLB play-offs
2	FC Lugano	30	17	8	5	76	30	+46	42	Qualified promotion/relegation play-offs NLA/NLB
3	FC Bulle	30	18	6	6	75	39	+36	42	Qualified promotion/relegation play-offs NLA/NLB
4	ES FC Malley	30	14	9	7	53	42	+11	37	Qualified promotion/relegation play-offs NLA/NLB
5	FC Baden	30	15	5	10	60	46	+14	35	
6	CS Chênois	30	13	8	9	66	57	+9	34	
7	FC Schaffhausen	30	13	7	10	54	55	−1	33	
8	FC Chiasso	30	9	9	12	39	49	−10	27	
9	SC Zug	30	7	12	11	32	44	−12	26	
10	FC Winterthur	30	7	11	12	37	41	−4	25	
11	FC Martigny-Sports	30	9	7	14	37	48	−11	25	
12	Etoile Carouge FC	30	9	7	14	36	52	−16	25	
13	FC Biel-Bienne	30	9	6	15	45	71	−26	24	Qualified promotion/relegation play-offs NLB/1. Liga
14	SC Kriens	30	7	9	14	40	58	−18	23	Qualified promotion/relegation play-offs NLB/1. Liga
15	FC Olten	30	7	4	19	36	68	−32	18	Qualified promotion/relegation play-offs NLB/1. Liga
16	FC Renens	30	6	5	19	34	69	−35	17	Qualified promotion/relegation play-offs NLB/1. Liga

Source: rsssf.com
Rules for classification: 1) Points; 2) Goal difference; 3) Goals scored; 4) Head-to-head points; 5) Away goals scored; 6) Draw.

=== Promotion/relegation play-off NLA/NLB ===
The four teams in eleventh to fourteenth position in the NLA competed a two-legged play-off round with the top four teams of the NLB to decide the last to slots in next season's NLA. The qualification games were played on 20 and 23 June and the finals on 27 and 30 June.

==== Qualification round ====
Team 1	Score	Team 2
Aarau	3–1	ES Malley
ES Malley	0–6	Aarau

Aarau win 9–1 on aggregate and continue to the finals. ES Malley remain in the NLB.

Team 1	Score	Team 2
Basel	2–2	Bulle
Bulle	2–2 (p. 3–5)	Basel

Basel win in the penalty shoot-out and continue to the finals. Bulle remain in the NLB.

Team 1	Score	Team 2
Vevey Sports	1–1	Lugano
Lugano	1–0	Vevey Sports

FC Lugano win 2–1 on aggregate and continue to the finals. Vevey Sports are relegated to 1987–88 Nationalliga B.

Team 1	Score	Team 2
Grenchen	0–0	Wettingen
Wettingen	4–0	Grenchen

Wettingen win 4–0 on aggregate and continue to the finals. FC Grenchen remain in the NLB.

==== Final round ====
Team 1	Score	Team 2
Wettingen	2–1	Basel
Basel	7–0	Wettingen

Basel win 8–2 on aggregate and remain in the NLA. Wettingen are relegated to 1987–88 Nationalliga B

Team 1	Score	Team 2
Aarau	5–0	Lugano
Lugano	1–0	Aarau

Aarau win 5–1 on aggregate and remain in the NLA. Lugano remain in the NLB.

== 1. Liga ==
=== Group 1 ===
Pos	Team	Pld	W	D	L	GF	GA	GD	Pts	Qualification or relegation
1	FC Montreux-Sports	26	15	6	5	59	33	+26	36	Play-off to Nationalliga B
2	Yverdon-Sport FC	26	16	4	6	56	37	+19	36	Play-off to Nationalliga B
3	FC Fribourg	26	12	9	5	61	28	+33	33	
4	FC Echallens	26	12	8	6	47	33	+14	32	
5	FC Monthey	26	14	1	11	53	50	+3	29	
6	Grand-Lancy FC	26	12	2	12	49	47	+2	26	
7	FC Châtel-Saint-Denis	26	11	4	11	44	46	−2	26	
8	FC Leytron	26	9	8	9	35	46	−11	26	
9	FC Stade Lausanne	26	8	9	9	39	39	0	25	
10	FC Vernier	26	7	7	12	44	47	−3	21	
11	Folgore Lausanne	26	7	7	12	34	54	−20	21	
12	FC Aigle	26	7	5	14	50	60	−10	19	
13	FC Saint-Jean GE	26	7	4	15	32	57	−25	18	Relegation to 2. Liga Interregional
14	FC Savièse	26	5	6	15	34	60	−26	16	Relegation to 2. Liga Interregional

Source: RSSSF
Rules for classification: 1) Points; 2) Goal difference within the league, but decider play-off for qualifiers.

=== Group 2 ===
Pos	Team	Pld	W	D	L	GF	GA	GD	Pts	Qualification or relegation
1	BSC Old Boys	26	14	11	1	44	18	+26	39	Play-off to Nationalliga B
2	FC Bern	26	12	8	6	40	28	+12	32	Play-off to Nationalliga B
3	FC Thun	26	13	5	8	54	35	+19	31	
4	FC Colombier	26	11	6	9	38	39	−1	28	
5	SR Delémont	26	11	6	9	41	42	−1	28	
6	FC Dürrenast	26	12	3	11	48	45	+3	27	
7	FC Laufen	26	10	6	10	45	36	+9	26	
8	FC Le Locle	26	8	9	9	29	30	−1	25	
9	FC Breitenbach	26	9	6	11	34	38	−4	24	
10	SC Baudepartement Basel	26	8	7	11	33	39	−6	23	
11	FC Moutier	26	5	12	9	32	40	−8	22	
12	FC Köniz	26	6	9	11	35	44	−9	21	
13	FC Lengnau	26	6	8	12	36	60	−24	20	Relegation to 2. Liga Interregional
14	FC Nordstern Basel	26	5	8	13	35	50	−15	18	Relegation to 2. Liga Interregional

Source: RSSSF
Rules for classification: 1) Points; 2) Goal difference within the league, but decider play-off for qualifiers.

=== Group 3 ===
Pos	Team	Pld	W	D	L	GF	GA	GD	Pts	Qualification or relegation
1	FC Solothurn	26	15	7	4	49	21	+28	37	Play-off to Nationalliga B
2	SC Buochs	26	15	6	5	49	28	+21	36	Play-off to Nationalliga B
3	FC Mendrisio	26	12	11	3	38	22	+16	35	
4	FC Zug	26	7	14	5	31	22	+9	28	
5	SC Burgdorf	26	9	10	7	37	33	+4	28	
6	FC Klus-Balsthal	26	11	6	9	39	37	+2	28	
7	FC Emmenbrücke	26	10	7	9	32	35	−3	27	
8	FC Suhr	26	6	14	6	32	27	+5	26	
9	FC Sursee	26	6	12	8	32	32	0	24	
10	FC Altdorf (Uri)	26	7	8	11	35	43	−8	22	
11	FC Muri	26	4	11	11	29	42	−13	19	
12	FC Ascona	26	6	7	13	23	40	−17	19	
13	FC Ibach	26	5	8	13	29	51	−22	18	Relegation to 2. Liga Interregional
14	FC Langenthal	26	4	9	13	30	52	−22	17	Relegation to 2. Liga Interregional

Source: RSSSF
Rules for classification: 1) Points; 2) Goal difference within the league, but decider play-off for qualifiers.

=== Group 4 ===
Pos	Team	Pld	W	D	L	GF	GA	GD	Pts	Qualification or relegation
1	FC Altstätten (St. Gallen)	26	13	11	2	35	14	+21	37	Play-off to Nationalliga B
2	FC Red Star Zürich	26	13	8	5	38	24	+14	34	To decider for second place
3	FC Chur	26	15	4	7	57	45	+12	34	To decider for second place
4	FC Dübendorf	26	11	10	5	44	31	+13	32	
5	FC Brüttisellen	26	11	10	5	33	22	+11	32	
6	FC Einsiedeln	26	12	5	9	45	39	+6	29	
7	FC Vaduz	26	11	3	12	53	51	+2	25	
8	FC Rorschach	26	8	7	11	40	40	0	23	
9	FC Stäfa	26	9	4	13	36	44	−8	22	
10	FC Herisau	26	8	6	12	30	40	−10	22	
11	FC Tuggen	26	8	5	13	32	42	−10	21	
12	FC Küsnacht	26	5	9	12	27	42	−15	19	
13	FC Gossau	26	6	5	15	25	37	−12	17	Relegation to 2. Liga Interregional
14	FC Rüti	26	4	9	13	23	47	−24	17	Relegation to 2. Liga Interregional

Source: RSSSF
Rules for classification: 1) Points; 2) Goal difference within the league, but decider play-off for qualifiers.

==== Decider for second position ====
The decider was played on 2 June 1987 in Tuggen

Team 1	Score	Team 2
FC Chur	2–2 a.e.t. 5–4 pen.	FC Red Star Zürich

FC Chur win 5–4 in the penalty-shoot-out and advance to play-offs.

=== Promotion play-off ===
==== First stage ====
First Stage between the winners and runner-up of the four groups

Team 1	Score	Team 2
Yverdon-Sport FC	4–1	FC Altstätten
FC Altstätten	2–5	Yverdon-Sport FC

Yverdon-Sport FC win 9–3 on aggregate and are promoted to 1987–88 Nationalliga B. FC Altstätten continue in the final stage.

Team 1	Score	Team 2
FC Solothurn	0–0	FC Bern
FC Bern	1–2	FC Solothurn

FC Solothurn win 2–1 on aggregate and are promoted to 1987–88 Nationalliga B. FC Bern continue in the final stage.

Team 1	Score	Team 2
FC Montreux-Sports	1–1	SC Buochs
SC Buochs	0–2	FC Montreux-Sports

FC Montreux-Sports win 3–1 on aggregate and are promoted to 1987–88 Nationalliga B. SC Buochs continue in the final stage.

Team 1	Score	Team 2
FC Chur	0–1	BSC Old Boys
BSC Old Boys	0–2	FC Chur

FC Chur win 2–1 on aggregate and are promoted to 1987–88 Nationalliga B. BSC Old Boys continue in the final stage.

==== Final stage ====
Second stage between the losers of the first stage and the last four teams from the NLB

Team 1	Score	Team 2
FC Altstätten	2–2	FC Olten
FC Olten	2–1	FC Altstätten

FC Olten win 4–3 on aggregate and remain in the 1987–88 Nationalliga B. FC Altstätten remain in the division for the 1987–88 Swiss 1. Liga season..

Team 1	Score	Team 2
FC Bern	3–2	FC Biel-Bienne
FC Biel-Bienne	5–2 a.e.t.	FC Bern

FC Biel-Bienne win 7–5 on aggregate and remain in the 1987–88 Nationalliga B. FC Bern remain in the division for the 1987–88 Swiss 1. Liga season..

Team 1	Score	Team 2
FC Renens	2–1	SC Buochs
SC Buochs	2–3	FC Renens

FC Renens win 5–3 on aggregate and remain in the 1987–88 Nationalliga B. SC Buochs remain in the division for the 1987–88 Swiss 1. Liga season..

Team 1	Score	Team 2
SC Kriens	0–4	BSC Old Boys
BSC Old Boys	2–1	SC Kriens

BSC Old Boys win 6–1 on aggregate and are promoted to the 1987–88 Nationalliga B. SC Kriens are relegated to the 1987–88 Swiss 1. Liga season..

== Swiss Cup ==
=== Early rounds ===
The routes of the finalists to the final, played on Whit Monday 8 June in Wankdorf Stadium in Bern:

- Round 3: Emmenbrücke-YB 1:4. Renens-Servette 1:2 a.e.t.
- Round 4: Bellinzona-YB 1:2. Servette-Lausanne 2:0.
- Round 5: GC-YB 0:3. Servette-La Chaux-de-Fonds 7:2.
- Quarter-finals: YB-Grenchen 1:0. Servette-Aarau 2:1.
- Semi-finals: Locarno-YB 1:4 a.e.t. Sion-Servette 1:1 a.e.t. Relay: Servette-Sion 3:1.

=== Final ===
8 June 1987

Young Boys	4–2 (a.e.t.)	Servette
Zuffi 18'; Prytz 55' (pen.); Siwek 93'; Gertschen 117'	Report	17' Schnyder; 67' Decastel

Stadion Wankdorf, Bern
Attendance: 28,000
Referee: Georges Sandoz (Auvernier)

== Swiss Clubs in Europe ==
- Young Boys as 1985–86 Nationalliga A champions: 1986–87 European Cup and entered 1986 Intertoto Cup
- Sion as 1985–86 Swiss Cup winners: 1986–87 Cup Winners' Cup
- Xamax as league runners-up: 1986–87 UEFA Cup
- Luzern as league third placed team: 1986–87 UEFA Cup and entered 1986 Intertoto Cup
- Zürich: entered 1986 Intertoto Cup
- Grasshopper Club: entered 1986 Intertoto Cup
- Lausanne-Sport: entered 1986 Intertoto Cup
- St. Gallen: entered 1986 Intertoto Cup

=== Young Boys ===
==== European Cup ====
===== First round =====
17 September 1986 First leg	Young Boys (Switzerland)	1–0	(Spain) Real Madrid	Wankdorf Stadium, Bern
19:00	Bamert 2'	Report		Attendance: 32,000; Referee: Paolo Casarin (Italy)

1 October 1986 Second leg	Real Madrid (Spain)	5–0	(Switzerland) Young Boys	Santiago Bernabéu, Madrid
20:000	Santillana 36'; Valdano 72'; Sánchez 78'; Butragueño 80', 82'	Report		Attendance: 75,000; Referee: Karl-Josef Assenmacher (West Germany)

Real Madrid won 5–1 on aggregate.

==== Intertoto Cup ====
===== Group 5 =====
Pos	Team	Pld	W	D	L	GF	GA	GD	Pts	SIG	HAN	LWA	YB
1	(Czechoslovakia) Sigma Olomouc	6	3	1	2	12	11	+1	7	—	3–2	3–0	3–1
2	(West Germany) Hannover 96	6	2	2	2	10	10	0	6	1–1	—	2–2	2–1
3	(Poland) Legia Warszawa	6	2	2	2	9	9	0	6	5–1	1–0	—	0–0
4	(Switzerland) Young Boys	6	2	1	3	9	10	−1	5	2–1	2–3	3–1	—

Source: mogiel.net
Rules for classification: 1) points; 2) goal difference; 3) number of goals scored.

=== Sion ===
==== Cup Winners' Cup ====
===== First round =====
17 September 1986 First leg	Aberdeen (Scotland)	2–1	(Switzerland) Sion	Pittodrie Stadium, Aberdeen
	Bett 73' (pen.); Wright 81'	Report	Débonnaire 40'	Attendance: 12,312; Referee: Einar Halle (Norway)

1 October 1986 Second leg	Sion (Switzerland)	3–0	(Scotland) Aberdeen	Stade Tourbillon, Sion
	Leighton 5' (o.g.); Bouderbala 29'; Brigger 88'	Report		Attendance: 11,807; Referee: Bep Thomas (Netherlands)

Sion won 4–2 on aggregate.

===== Second round =====
22 October 1986 First leg	Katowice (Poland)	2–2	(Switzerland) Sion	Stadion Śląski, Chorzów
	Koniarek 10', 12'	Report	Brigger 74'; Cina 78'	Attendance: 10,176; Referee: (Greece) Antonios Vassaras

5 November 1986 Second leg	Sion (Switzerland)	3–0	(Poland) Katowice	Stade de Tourbillon, Sion
	Bregy 57' (pen.); Cina 58'; Brigger 82'	Report		Attendance: 9,950; Referee: (Portugal) Vitor M. Fernandes Correia

Sion won 5–2 on aggregate.

===== Quarter-final =====
4 March 1987 First leg	Lokomotive Leipzig (East Germany)	2–0	(Switzerland) Sion	Zentralstadion, Leipzig
	Marschall 87'; Richter 90'	Report		Attendance: 21,000; Referee: Henning Lund-Sørensen (Denmark)

18 March 1987 Second leg	Sion (Switzerland)	0–0	(East Germany) Lokomotive Leipzig	Stade de Tourbillon, Sion
		Report		Attendance: 12,200; Referee: (Romania) Ioan Igna

Lokomotive Leipzig won 2–0 on aggregate.

=== Xamax ===
==== UEFA Cup ====
===== First round =====
16 September 1986 First leg	Neuchâtel Xamax (Switzerland)	2–0	(Denmark) Lyngby	Stade de la Maladière, Neuchâtel
20:00	Jacobacci 29'; Stielike 82'	Report		Attendance: 8,200; Referee: José Guedes (Portugal)

1 October 1986 Second leg	Lyngby (Denmark)	1–3	(Switzerland) Neuchâtel Xamax	Lyngby Stadium, Kongens Lyngby
19:00	Jørgensen 72'	Report	Jacobacci 2'; Lüthi 38', 44'	Attendance: 4,062; Referee: Klaus Peschel (East Germany)

Neuchâtel Xamax won 5–1 on aggregate.

===== Second round =====
22 October 1986 First leg	Groningen (Netherlands)	0–0	(Switzerland) Neuchâtel Xamax	Stadion Oosterpark, Groningen
20:00		Report		Attendance: 15,302; Referee: Thorbjørn Aas (Norway)

5 November 1986 Second leg	Neuchâtel Xamax (Switzerland)	1–1	(Netherlands) Groningen	Stade de la Maladière, Neuchâtel
20:00	Sutter 39'	Report	van Dijk 44'	Attendance: 11,600; Referee: Lajos Németh (Hungary)

1–1 on aggregate; Groningen won on away goals.

=== Luzern ===
==== UEFA Cup ====
===== First round =====
17 September 1986 First leg	Spartak Moscow (Soviet Union)	0–0	(Switzerland) Luzern	Central Lenin Stadium, Moscow
17:00		Report		Attendance: 38,000; Referee: Aron Schmidhuber (West Germany)

1 October 1986 Second leg	Luzern (Switzerland)	0–1	(Soviet Union) Spartak Moscow	Stadion Allmend, Lucerne
20:15		Report	Kuzhlev 87'	Attendance: 17,300; Referee: Jozef Marko (Czechoslovakia)

Spartak Moscow won 1–0 on aggregate.

==== Intertoto Cup ====
===== Group 11 =====
Pos	Team	Pld	W	D	L	GF	GA	GD	Pts	SLP	STU	LUZ	FER
1	(Czechoslovakia) Slavia Prague	6	4	2	0	11	2	+9	10	—	1–1	1–1	2–0
2	(Austria) Sturm Graz	6	3	1	2	7	11	−4	7	0–3	—	3–2	1–5
3	(Switzerland) Luzern	6	2	1	3	10	12	−2	5	0–3	0–1	—	3–2
4	(Hungary) Ferencváros	6	1	0	5	9	12	−3	2	0–1	0–1	2–4	—

Source: mogiel.net
Rules for classification: 1) points; 2) goal difference; 3) number of goals scored.

=== Zürich ===
==== Intertoto Cup ====
===== Group 10 =====
Pos	Team	Pld	W	D	L	GF	GA	GD	Pts	GÖT	VIT	CSK	ZÜR
1	(Sweden) IFK Göteborg	6	4	0	2	13	7	+6	8	—	5–0	1–0	3–0
2	(Czechoslovakia) Vítkovice	6	3	1	2	9	12	−3	7	3–1	—	1–3	2–1
3	(Bulgaria) Sredets Sofia	6	3	0	3	8	6	+2	6	2–0	0–1	—	2–0
4	(Switzerland) Zürich	6	1	1	4	8	13	−5	3	2–3	2–2	3–1	—

Source: mogiel.net
Rules for classification: 1) points; 2) goal difference; 3) number of goals scored.

=== GC ===
==== Intertoto Cup ====
===== Group 6 =====
Pos	Team	Pld	W	D	L	GF	GA	GD	Pts	ÚJP	AGF	GCZ	ADM
1	(Hungary) Újpest	6	5	0	1	12	6	+6	10	—	1–0	3–1	2–0
2	(Denmark) AGF	6	3	0	3	8	9	−1	6	2–3	—	2–1	1–0
3	(Switzerland) Grasshopper Club	6	2	1	3	9	9	0	5	0–1	4–1	—	2–1
4	(Austria) Admira Wacker Wein	6	1	1	4	5	10	−5	3	3–2	0–2	1–1	—

Source: mogiel.net
Rules for classification: 1) points; 2) goal difference; 3) number of goals scored.

=== Lausanne-Sport ===
==== Intertoto Cup ====
===== Group 2 =====
Pos	Team	Pld	W	D	L	GF	GA	GD	Pts	BER	UER	LS	STA
1	(East Germany) Union Berlin	6	4	1	1	11	8	+3	9	—	3–2	1–0	4–1
2	(West Germany) Bayer Uerdingen	6	4	0	2	13	8	+5	8	3–0	—	2–1	3–1
3	(Switzerland) Lausanne-Sport	6	2	1	3	7	6	+1	5	1–1	2–0	—	3–1
4	(Belgium) Standard Liège	6	1	0	5	6	15	−9	2	1–2	1–3	1–0	—

Source: mogiel.net
Rules for classification: 1) points; 2) goal difference; 3) number of goals scored.

=== St. Gallen ===
==== Intertoto Cup ====
===== Group 7 =====
Pos	Team	Pld	W	D	L	GF	GA	GD	Pts	BRØ	WID	MAG	STG
1	(Denmark) Brøndby	6	4	2	0	16	8	+8	10	—	3–0	4–3	3–0
2	(Poland) Widzew Łódź	6	4	1	1	16	11	+5	9	3–3	—	3–0	3–2
3	(East Germany) Magdeburg	6	1	1	4	12	15	−3	3	1–1	3–4	—	5–1
4	(Switzerland) St. Gallen	6	1	0	5	6	16	−10	2	1–2	0–3	2–0	—

Source: mogiel.net
Rules for classification: 1) points; 2) goal difference; 3) number of goals scored.

== Sources ==
- Switzerland 1986–87 at RSSSF
- Cup finals at Fussball-Schweiz
- Intertoto history at Pawel Mogielnicki's Page
- Josef Zindel (2018). FC Basel 1893. Die ersten 125 Jahre (in German). Basel: Friedrich Reinhardt Verlag. ISBN 978-3-7245-2305-5.

Preceded by 1985–86	Seasons in Swiss football	Succeeded by 1987–88
