= Nigel French =

Welsh footballer (born 1968)

Personal information
- Full name: Nigel Peter French
- Date of birth: 24 March 1968 (age 58)
- Place of birth: Swansea, Wales
- Position: Midfielder

Youth career
- 1984–1985: Swansea City

Senior career*
Years	Team	Apps	(Gls)
1985–1987	Swansea City	26	(3)
1987–1989	Merthyr Tydfil		
1989–1992	Haverfordwest County		
1993	Aberystwyth Town		
1995–1997	Briton Ferry Athletic		
1997–1998	Haverfordwest County		
- Barry Town United

International career
- Wales U15
1986	Wales U18	2	(0)
- * Club domestic league appearances and goals

Nigel Peter French (born 24 March 1968) is a Welsh former footballer who played as a midfielder.

== Club career ==
French joined Swansea City in 1984, as part of the youth training scheme. He made his debut for the club on 17 August 1985, as a substitute for Colin Pascoe during a 1–0 defeat to Wigan Athletic in the Football League Division Three. He signed his first professional contract with the club in March 1986, and was later awarded a regional Fiat Young Player of the Month award that month. However, French was transfer-listed by the club in November 1986. Overall, French played 36 matches for Swansea City, scoring five goals, including 26 appearances and three goals in the Football League.

In May 1987, he was released by Swansea City, and despite almost signing for Weymouth, combined with interest from other Football League clubs and a team in Belgium, he joined Merthyr Tydfil in July 1987, as he wanted to remain in South Wales. There, he helped them win both the 1987–88 Southern Football League Midland Division and 1988–89 Southern Football League Premier Division titles, and was part of the team that beat Atalanta 2–1 in the 1987–88 European Cup Winners' Cup.

In December 1989, he signed for Haverfordwest County. Following this, he played for Aberystwyth Town and Briton Ferry Athletic, before returning to Haverfordwest County, and afterwards played for Barry Town United

== International career ==
While still in school, France represented Wales's under-15 national team. In January 1986, he was called up to the Wales under-18 national team for a 1988 UEFA European Under-18 Championship qualifying match against Scotland, later making another appearance against the Netherlands in March during 1986 UEFA European Under-18 Championship qualifying.
