= Merthyr Tydfil F.C. 2–1 Atalanta BC =

Merthyr Tydfil v Atalanta
- Event: 1987–88 European Cup Winners' Cup first round, first leg
Merthyr Tydfil	Atalanta
(Wales)	(Italy)
2	1
- Date: 16 September 1987
- Venue: Penydarren Park, Merthyr Tydfil
- Referee: Charles Gilson (Luxembourg)
- Attendance: 8,000

In the first round of the 1987–88 European Cup Winners' Cup, Welsh Cup winners Merthyr Tydfil were drawn against Coppa Italia runners-up Atalanta, marking only the third time that two non-first division sides had faced each other in European competition. Despite Merthyr Tydfil being a semi-professional club playing in the Southern Football League Midland Division, then the 7th tier of English football, they beat Atalanta 2–1 at home in the first leg, thanks to goals from Kevin Rogers and Ceri Williams, with the match being regarded as one of the greatest in the history of Welsh football.

== Background ==
Merthyr Tydfil qualified for the European Cup Winners' Cup after winning the 1986–87 Welsh Cup, where they beat Cardiff City, Caernarfon Town, Barry Town, and Bangor City, en route to the final against Newport County at Ninian Park. In the final, a 2–2 draw saw the match replayed a few days later, with Chris Baird scoring the only goal from a penalty in the 6th minute to secure the club's first Welsh Cup since 1951. At the time, Merthyr Tydfil were a semi-professional club who played in the Southern Football League Midland Division, then the 7th tier of English football, becoming the lowest-division team to ever qualify for European football.

Meanwhile, Atalanta had just been relegated to Serie B, having finished 15th in the 1986–87 Serie A, but qualified for the Cup Winners' Cup as 1986–87 Coppa Italia runners-up, as winners Napoli qualified for the European Cup as league champions.

Prior to the match, there were concerns over where Merthyr Tydfil would play their European matches, with reports that the match could be played at Ninian Park. However, club chairman John Reddy raised £150,000 to increase the capacity of Penydarren Park to 10,000 spectators, inclduing new standing and seating areas and a new stadium access area. Meanwhile, an Italian journalist reportedly claimed that if Atalanta weren't 5–1 up by half-time, the match would be a farce. Shortly before the match, Merthyr forward and former England international Bob Latchford was ruled out of the match with a groin strain.

== Match ==
A total of 8,000 spectators attended the match. Additionally, the match attracted national press, as English clubs were still banned from European competition following the Heysel Stadium disaster in May 1985.

Merthyr Tydfil's first shot came in the fifth minute, when Nigel French got a through ball and shot it over the crossbar from eight yards out. In the 34th minute, they were awarded an indirect free-kick just inside the box, after Luxembourgian referee Charles Gilson penalized Atalanta goalkeeper Ottorino Piotti for taking too many steps. David Tong took the free kick, rolling it to Kevin Rogers, who scored to put the Welsh side 1–0 up. Three minutes later, Tong took another free kick which was shot wide by Rogers, while a shot by Dave Webley shortly after was denied by Piotti. Six minutes after Rogers' goal, Merthyr Tydfil goalkeeper Gary Wager deflected a cross by Glenn Strömberg, which landed to Domenico Progna who scored Atalanta's equalizer and ended the Welsh goalkeeper's streak of six clean sheets in a row.

In the second half, Atalanta began to putt pressure on Merthyr Tydfil, with the Welsh side only getting the odd attack in. In the 82nd minute, Chris Williams was fouled by Atalanta's defense, giving Merthyr Tydfil another free kick. While the Atalanta players argued, putting together a weak wall in the process, Ceri Williams shot the free kick off Progna and past Piotti to make it 2–1.

=== Details ===
16 September 1987

Merthyr Tydfil (Wales)	2–1	(Italy) Atalanta
Rogers 34'; Williams 82'		Progna 41'

Penydarren Park, Merthyr Tydfil
Attendance: 8,000
Referee: Charles Gilson (Luxembourg)

GK	(Wales) Gary Wager
(England) David Tong
(Wales) Chris Baird
(Wales) Roger Mullen
(Wales) Phil Evans
(Wales) Kevin Rogers
(Wales) Nigel French
(Wales) Dave Webley
(Wales) Chris Williams	(substituted off) 87'
(Wales) Andy Beattie (c)
(Wales) Ceri Williams
Substitutes:
DF	(Wales) Peter Jones	(substituted on) 87'
(Wales) Anthony Hopkins
Chris Holvey
(Wales) Steve Williams
Jones
Manager:
(Wales) Lyn Jones

GK	(Italy) Ottorino Piotti
(Italy) Carmine Gentile
(Italy) Luigino Pasciullo	(substituted off) 46'
(Italy) Cesare Prandelli
(Italy) Costanzo Barcella
(Italy) Domenico Progna
(Sweden) Glenn Strömberg
(Italy) Andrea Icardi
(Italy) Oliviero Garlini
(Italy) Daniele Fortunato
(Italy) Giuseppe Incocciati	(substituted off) 75'
Substitutes:
MF	(Italy) Eligio Nicolini	(substituted on) 46'
FW	(Italy) Aldo Cantarutti	(substituted on) 75'
GK	(Italy) Nello Malizia
(Italy) Gianmario Consonni
(Italy) Giuseppe Compagno
Manager:
(Italy) Emiliano Mondonico

Assistant referees:
Erny Kesseler (Luxembourg)
Roger Philippi (Luxembourg)

== Aftermath ==
Following the match, the Merthyr Tydfil players became local celebraties, with Ceri Williams being profiled on the ITV show Saint and Greavsie. However, the Italian press saw the defeat as a humiliation, claiming the result had made a mockery of one of their own teams and predicting that Atalanta would win the second leg in a landslide. Two weeks later, the second leg was played at the Stadio Atleti Azzurri d’Italia in Bergamo on 30 September. Atalanta won that match 2–0 after early goals by Oliviero Garlini and Aldo Cantarutti, advancing to the second round with a 3–2 aggregate win. They would go on to beat OFI Crete and Sporting CP in the next two rounds to reach the semi-finals, where they lost 4–2 on aggregate to Belgian side KV Mechelen.

A decade after the match, Webley admitted in an interview with the Sunday People that the result was "unbelievable", and that after the first leg, the Merthyr Tydfil players believed that they could sneak a draw in the second leg in Italy.

=== In popular culture ===
On 22 April 2016, a film about the match titled The Martyrs of 87 was first screened at Penydarren Park, with tickets selling out after 30 minutes. The film was directed by then-Merthyr Town communications officer Matthew Davies. Another film was announced in February 2017 under the working title Martyrs 87, set to be directed by Joann Randles, with filming set to begin that summer.

In August 2026, a stage comedy based on the match titled Just One Cornetto was announced, set during both the build-up to the match, as well as the match itself. The opening night was attended by the members of the Merthyr Tydfil squad, as well as Merthyr natives Owen Money and Jonny Owen, and Welsh BBC presenter Jason Mohammad.
