= Kevin Rogers (footballer) =

Welsh footballer and manager

Personal information
- Full name: Kevin Penry Rogers
- Date of birth: 23 September 1963 (age 63)
- Place of birth: Merthyr Tydfil, Wales
- Position: Midfielder

Youth career
- 1979–1981: Aston Villa

Senior career*
Years	Team	Apps	(Gls)
1981–1983	Aston Villa	0	(0)
1983–1984	Birmingham City	9	(1)
1984–1985	Wrexham	35	(3)
1985–1986	Rhyl		
1986–199?	Merthyr Tydfil		

Managerial career
- 2009–2010: Troedyrhiw
- * Club domestic league appearances and goals

Kevin Penry Rogers (born 23 September 1963) is a Welsh former professional footballer who played as a midfielder in the Football League for Birmingham City and Wrexham. He played in the European Cup Winners' Cup for both Wrexham and Merthyr Tydfil.

== Football career ==
Rogers was born in Merthyr Tydfil. When he left school in 1979, he joined Aston Villa as an apprentice, and turned professional two years later. He remained with the club for two years as a professional, without playing for the first team, then joined Birmingham City on a free transfer in April 1983. Rogers made his debut in the First Division on 5 November 1983, coming on as substitute for Mick Harford in a 2–1 home defeat to Coventry City. He started eight league games, including the last five games of the 1983–84 season, but failed to impress, and was allowed to join Fourth Division Wrexham in July 1984.

Wrexham had won the Welsh Cup in 1984, so qualified for the European Cup-Winners' Cup. Drawn against Porto in the first round, Rogers contributed to a 1–0 win in the home leg and then a 4–3 defeat in the away leg – in which he missed a good chance to make the score 4–4 – to go through to the next round on away goals. He played in both legs as Wrexham went out 3–0 on aggregate to Roma in the second round. After 35 league games, in which he scored three goals, Rogers moved into non-league football in Wales, first with Rhyl and then with Merthyr Tydfil.

Merthyr, then a Southern League Midland Division club, won the Welsh Cup in 1987, defeating Newport County, then a Football League club, after a replay. Rogers played in both legs of the final, alongside former England international Bob Latchford, who won his only piece of silverware with this victory. The Welsh Cup winners qualified for the European Cup-Winners' Cup. Drawn against Italian representatives Atalanta in the first round, Rogers, described as "gifted with considerable accuracy with his left foot", scored one of the goals which gave the Welsh club a 2–1 victory in the home leg, though they lost the away leg 2–0 and so were eliminated. Rogers played for Merthyr well into the 1990s, by which time they had risen to the Conference, and captained the club.

In 2006, he was appointed assistant to Brian Sparks as manager of Troedyrhiw, then playing in the Second Division of the Welsh League, and remained in post when Cohen Griffith took over as manager and the club were relegated to the Third Division. When Griffith stepped down in May 2009, Rogers took over as manager, but left the post early the following year.
