= 1987–88 European Cup Winners' Cup =

Tournament details
- Dates: 23 August 1987 – 11 May 1988
- Teams: 32 (first round); 33 (qualifying)

Final positions
- Champions: (Belgium) KV Mechelen (1st title)
- Runners-up: (Netherlands) Ajax

Tournament statistics
- Matches played: 63
- Goals scored: 131 (2.08 per match)
- Attendance: 957,273 (15,195 per match)
- Top scorer(s): Paulinho Cascavel (Sporting CP); 6 goals

The 1987–88 season of the European Cup Winners' Cup finished with a shock victory by KV Mechelen in the final against defending champions Ajax. This led to their 1988 European Super Cup title in the club's first ever European campaign (1987–89). As the next season's Belgian league victor it defended its title in a semifinal of the 1988–89 European Cup Winners' Cup. Financial problems have been keeping this last Belgian holder of any European cup away from a position to be as successful again.

== Preliminary round ==
Team 1	Agg.	Team 2	1st leg	2nd leg
AEL Limassol (Cyprus)	1–6	(Czechoslovakia) Dunajská Streda	0–1	1–5

=== First leg ===
23 August 1987

AEL Limassol (Cyprus)	0–1	(Czechoslovakia) Dunajská Streda
	Report	Majoros 66'

Tsirio Stadium, Limassol
Attendance: 5,586
Referee: Heinz Holzmann (Austria)

=== Second leg ===
27 August 1987

Dunajská Streda (Czechoslovakia)	5–1	(Cyprus) AEL Limassol
Mičinec 6', 39'; J. Medgyes 20'; Pavlík 27'; Majoros 85' (pen.)	Report	Aristotelous 69'

Mestský štadión, Dunajská Streda
Attendance: 4,501
Referee: Stjepan Glavina (Yugoslavia)

Dunajská Streda won 6–1 on aggregate.

== First round ==
Team 1	Agg.	Team 2	1st leg	2nd leg
KV Mechelen (Belgium)	3–0	(Romania) Dinamo București	1–0	2–0
St Mirren (Scotland)	1–0	(Norway) Tromsø	1–0	0–0
Real Sociedad (Spain)	2–0	(Poland) Śląsk Wrocław	0–0	2–0
Dinamo Minsk (Soviet Union)	4–1	(Turkey) Gençlerbirliği	2–0	2–1
Vitosha Sofia (Bulgaria)	2–3	(Greece) OFI	1–0	1–3
Merthyr Tydfil (Wales)	2–3	(Italy) Atalanta	2–1	0–2
ÍA (Iceland)	0–1	(Sweden) Kalmar FF	0–0	0–1 (aet)
Sporting CP (Portugal)	6–4	(Austria) Swarovski Tirol	4–0	2–4
Vllaznia (Albania)	6–0	(Malta) Sliema Wanderers	2–0	4–0
RoPS (Finland)	1–1 (a)	(Northern Ireland) Glentoran	0–0	1–1
Lokomotive Leipzig (East Germany)	0–1	(France) Marseille	0–0	0–1
AaB (Denmark)	1–1 (2–4 p)	(Socialist Federal Republic of Yugoslavia) Hajduk Split	1–0	0–1 (aet)
Újpesti Dózsa (Hungary)	2–3	(Netherlands) Den Haag	1–0	1–3
Dunajská Streda (Czechoslovakia)	3–4	(Switzerland) Young Boys	2–1	1–3
Avenir Beggen (Luxembourg)	0–8	(West Germany) Hamburg	0–5	0–3
Ajax (Netherlands)	6–0	(Republic of Ireland) Dundalk	4–0	2–0

=== First leg ===
13 September 1987

Vllaznia (Albania)	2–0	(Malta) Sliema Wanderers
Bushati 53'; Jera 68'	Report

Stadiumi Vojo Kushi, Shkodër
Attendance: 12,500
Referee: Vassilios Nikakis (Greece)

15 September 1987

ÍA (Iceland)	0–0	(Sweden) Kalmar FF
	Report

Akranesvöllur, Akranes
Attendance: 2,108
Referee: Thorodd Presberg (Norway)

15 September 1987

Sporting CP (Portugal)	4–0	(Austria) Swarovski Tirol
Sealy 7', 41'; Cascavel 24' (pen.), 83'	Report

Estádio José Alvalade, Lisbon
Attendance: 51,000
Referee: Marcel Van Langenhove (Belgium)

15 September 1987

Avenir Beggen (Luxembourg)	0–5	(West Germany) Hamburg
	Report	Labbadia 9', 70'; Laubinger 44'; Okoński 58'; Dittmer 83'

Stade rue Henri Dunant, Luxembourg
Attendance: 2,200
Referee: Alphonse Costantin (Belgium)

16 September 1987

KV Mechelen (Belgium)	1–0	(Romania) Dinamo București
den Boer 50'	Report

Achter de Kazerne, Mechelen
Attendance: 7,182
Referee: Ildefonso Urizar Azpitarte (Spain)

16 September 1987

St Mirren (Scotland)	1–0	(Norway) Tromsø
McDowall 3'	Report

Love Street, Paisley
Attendance: 7,797
Referee: Ignace Goris (Belgium)

16 September 1987

Real Sociedad (Spain)	0–0	(Poland) Śląsk Wrocław
	Report

Estadio San Mamés, Bilbao
Attendance: 6,251
Referee: Carlo Longhi (Italy)

16 September 1987

Dinamo Minsk (Soviet Union)	2–0	(Turkey) Gençlerbirliği
Zygmantovich 83'; Gotsmanov 88'	Report

Dinamo Stadium, Minsk
Attendance: 27,000
Referee: Eero Aho (Finland)

16 September 1987

Vitosha Sofia (Bulgaria)	1–0	(Greece) OFI
Sirakov 87' (pen.)	Report

Vasil Levski, Sofia
Attendance: 7,500
Referee: Helmut Kohl (Austria)

16 September 1987

Merthyr Tydfil (Wales)	2–1	(Italy) Atalanta
Rogers 34'; Ceri Williams 82'	Report	Progna 41'

Penydarren Park, Merthyr Tydfil
Attendance: 8,000
Referee: Charles Gilson (Luxembourg)

16 September 1987

RoPS (Finland)	0–0	(Northern Ireland) Glentoran
	Report

Keskuskenttä, Rovaniemi
Attendance: 3,987
Referee: Douglas Hope (Scotland)

16 September 1987

Lokomotive Leipzig (East Germany)	0–0	(France) Marseille
	Report

Zentralstadion, Leipzig
Attendance: 30,800
Referee: Erik Fredriksson (Sweden)

16 September 1987

AaB (Denmark)	1–0	(Socialist Federal Republic of Yugoslavia) Hajduk Split
Boye 63'	Report

Aalborg Stadion, Aalborg
Attendance: 6,800
Referee: Klaus Scheurell (East Germany)

16 September 1987

Újpesti Dózsa (Hungary)	1–0	(Netherlands) Den Haag
Herédi 31' (pen.)	Report

Megyeri úti stadion, Budapest
Attendance: 3,288
Referee: Karl-Heinz Tritschler (West Germany)

16 September 1987

Dunajská Streda (Czechoslovakia)	2–1	(Switzerland) Young Boys
Mičinec 9'; Kašpar 37'	Report	Zuffi 22'

Mestský štadión, Dunajská Streda
Attendance: 5,672
Referee: Ignace van Swieten (Netherlands)

16 September 1987

Ajax (Netherlands)	4–0	(Republic of Ireland) Dundalk
Rijkaard 65'; Blind 73'; Winter 81'; Stapleton 85'	Report

De Meer Stadion, Amsterdam
Attendance: 15,712
Referee: José María Enríquez Negreira (Spain)

=== Second leg ===
28 September 1987

Glentoran (Northern Ireland)	1–1	(Finland) RoPS
Caskey 65'	Report	Kallio 63'

The Oval, Belfast
Attendance: 4,101
Referee: Guðmundur Haraldsson (Iceland)

1–1 on aggregate. RoPS won on away goals

29 September 1987

Sliema Wanderers (Malta)	0–4	(Albania) Vllaznia
	Report	Pashaj 15'; Vukatana 59'; Rragami 70' (pen.); Fakja 83'

Ta' Qali, Attard
Attendance: 800
Referee: Aldo Soldatic (Yugoslavia)

Vllaznia won 6–0 on aggregate.

30 September 1987

Dinamo București (Romania)	0–2	(Belgium) KV Mechelen
	Report	Hofkens 39' den Boer 71'

Stadionul Dinamo, Bucharest
Attendance: 15,000
Referee: Pietro D'Elia (Italy)

Mechelen won 3–0 on aggregate.

30 September 1987

Tromsø (Norway)	0–0	(Scotland) St Mirren
	Report

Alfheim Stadion, Tromsø
Attendance: 5,114
Referee: Kurt Horsted (Denmark)

St Mirren won 1–0 on aggregate.

30 September 1987

Śląsk Wrocław (Poland)	0–2	(Spain) Real Sociedad
	Report	Loren 76'; Begiristain 82'

Stadion Olimpijski, Wrocław
Attendance: 25,000
Referee: Jan Keizer (Netherlands)

Real Sociedad won 2–0 on aggregate.

30 September 1987

Gençlerbirliği (Turkey)	1–2	(Soviet Union) Dinamo Minsk
Tuncay 29'	Report	Derkach 69'; Kondratiev 84'

Ankara 19 Mayıs Stadyumu, Ankara
Attendance: 7,445
Referee: Adrian Porumboiu (Romania)

Dinamo Minsk won 4–1 on aggregate.

30 September 1987

OFI (Greece)	3–1	(Bulgaria) Vitosha Sofia
Tsimbos 26'; Marinakis 48'; Charalambidis 68'	Report	Kurdov 71'

Yedi Kule, Heraklion
Attendance: 12,036
Referee: Bruno Galler (Switzerland)

OFI won 3–2 on aggregate.

30 September 1987

Atalanta (Italy)	2–0	(Wales) Merthyr Tydfil
Garlini 16'; Cantarutti 21'	Report

Stadio Atleti Azzurri d'Italia, Bergamo
Attendance: 7,901
Referee: Victor Mintoff (Malta)

Atalanta won 3–2 on aggregate.

30 September 1987

Kalmar FF (Sweden)	1–0 (a.e.t.)	(Iceland) ÍA
Alexandersson 102'	Report

Fredriksskans, Kalmar
Attendance: 1,067
Referee: Tadeusz Diakonowicz (Poland)

Kalmar FF won 1–0 on aggregate.

30 September 1987

Swarovski Tirol (Austria)	4–2	(Portugal) Sporting CP
Marko 16'; Roscher 53'; Pezzey 69'; Linzmaier 85'	Report	Sealy 57'; Cascavel 67'

Tivoli, Innsbruck
Attendance: 4,500
Referee: Paolo Casarin (Italy)

Sporting CP won 6–4 on aggregate.

30 September 1987

Marseille (France)	1–0	(East Germany) Lokomotive Leipzig
Allofs 8'	Report

Stade Vélodrome, Marseille
Attendance: 23,680
Referee: Franz Gächter (Switzerland)

Marseille won 1–0 on aggregate.

30 September 1987

Hajduk Split (Socialist Federal Republic of Yugoslavia)	1–0 (a.e.t.)	(Denmark) AaB
Asanović 43' (pen.)	Report
Penalties
Bursać (penalty scored); Dražić (penalty scored); Miljuš (penalty scored); Asanović (penalty scored)	4–2	(penalty scored) Simonsen; (penalty scored) Dissing; (penalty missed) Boye; (penalty missed) Henrik P. Hansen

Stadion Poljud, Split
Attendance: 7,422
Referee: Sadık Deda (Turkey)

1–1 on aggregate. Hajduk Split won 4–2 on penalties.

30 September 1987

Den Haag (Netherlands)	3–1	(Hungary) Újpesti Dózsa
Boere 22', 24'; Varga 82' (o.g.)	Report	Rostás 89'

Zuiderparkstadion, The Hague
Attendance: 11,500
Referee: Neil Midgley (England)

Den Haag won 3–2 on aggregate.

30 September 1987

Young Boys (Switzerland)	3–1	(Czechoslovakia) Dunajská Streda
Zuffi 63'; Weber 67'; Maissen 88'	Report	Majoros 78'

Stadion Wankdorf, Bern
Attendance: 8,100
Referee: Wolf-Günter Wiesel (West Germany)

Young Boys won 4–3 on aggregate.

30 September 1987

Hamburg (West Germany)	3–0	(Luxembourg) Avenir Beggen
Kroth 9'; Kaltz 72'; Labbadia 82'	Report

Volksparkstadion, Hamburg
Attendance: 6,500
Referee: Jan Damgaard (Denmark)

Hamburg won 8–0 on aggregate.

30 September 1987

Dundalk (Republic of Ireland)	0–2	(Netherlands) Ajax
	Report	Newe 71' (o.g.); Meijer 87'

Oriel Park, Dundalk
Attendance: 3,500
Referee: Rune Larsson (Sweden)

Ajax won 6–0 on aggregate.

== Second round ==
Team 1	Agg.	Team 2	1st leg	2nd leg
KV Mechelen (Belgium)	2–0	(Scotland) St Mirren	0–0	2–0
Real Sociedad (Spain)	1–1 (a)	(Soviet Union) Dinamo Minsk	1–1	0–0
OFI (Greece)	1–2	(Italy) Atalanta	1–0	0–2
Kalmar FF (Sweden)	1–5	(Portugal) Sporting CP	1–0	0–5
Vllaznia (Albania)	0–2	(Finland) RoPS	0–1	0–1
Marseille (France)	7–0	(Socialist Federal Republic of Yugoslavia) Hajduk Split	4–0	3–0^{1}
Den Haag (Netherlands)	2–2 (a)	(Switzerland) Young Boys	2–1	0–1
Hamburg (West Germany)	0–3	(Netherlands) Ajax	0–1	0–2

Notes

- Note 1: With Hajduk Split winning 2–0, the match was interrupted for 15 minutes due to tear gas being thrown onto the stands. The match was voided and awarded 3–0 to Marseille due to the crowd trouble.

=== First leg ===
21 October 1987

KV Mechelen (Belgium)	0–0	(Scotland) St Mirren
	Report

Achter de Kazerne, Mechelen
Attendance: 6,146
Referee: Lajos Hartmann (Hungary)

21 October 1987

Real Sociedad (Spain)	1–1	(Soviet Union) Dinamo Minsk
Gajate 87'	Report	Kondratiev 5'

Atotxa, San Sebastián
Attendance: 22,121
Referee: Vítor Fernandes Correia (Portugal)

21 October 1987

OFI (Greece)	1–0	(Italy) Atalanta
Persias 17'	Report

Toumba, Thessaloniki
Attendance: 11,758
Referee: Aron Schmidhuber (West Germany)

21 October 1987

Kalmar FF (Sweden)	1–0	(Portugal) Sporting CP
T. Arvidsson 88'	Report

Fredriksskans, Kalmar
Attendance: 2,070
Referee: Neil Midgley (England)

21 October 1987

Vllaznia (Albania)	0–1	(Finland) RoPS
	Report	Polack 27'

Stadiumi Vojo Kushi, Shkodër
Attendance: 15,000
Referee: Dimitar Dimitrov (Bulgaria)

21 October 1987

Den Haag (Netherlands)	2–1	(Switzerland) Young Boys
de Roode 3'; Boere 71'	Report	Zuffi 62'

Zuiderparkstadion, The Hague
Attendance: 9,337
Referee: Luigi Agnolin (Italy)

21 October 1987

Hamburg (West Germany)	0–1	(Netherlands) Ajax
	Report	Meijer 52'

Volksparkstadion, Hamburg
Attendance: 24,600
Referee: Franz Wöhrer (Austria)

22 October 1987

Marseille (France)	4–0	(Socialist Federal Republic of Yugoslavia) Hajduk Split
Papin 30'; Diallo 48'; Allofs 69'; Giresse 89'	Report

Stade Vélodrome, Marseille
Attendance: 28,313
Referee: Paolo Casarin (Italy)

=== Second leg ===
3 November 1987

St Mirren (Scotland)	0–2	(Belgium) KV Mechelen
	Report	Ohana 34', 50'

Love Street, Paisley
Attendance: 14,368
Referee: Einar Halle (Norway)

Mechelen won 2–0 on aggregate.

3 November 1987

Sporting CP (Portugal)	5–0	(Sweden) Kalmar FF
Cascavel 34' (pen.), 53', 57'; Sealy 62'; Duílio 73'	Report

Estádio José Alvalade, Lisbon
Attendance: 13,000
Referee: George Smith (Scotland)

Sporting CP won 5–1 on aggregate.

3 November 1987

RoPS (Finland)	1–0	(Albania) Vllaznia
Polack 47'	Report

Keskuskenttä, Rovaniemi
Attendance: 7,312
Referee: Bo Karlsson (Sweden)

RoPS won 2–0 on aggregate.

3 November 1987

Young Boys (Switzerland)	1–0	(Netherlands) Den Haag
Fimian 66'	Report

Stadion Wankdorf, Bern
Attendance: 6,400
Referee: Helmut Kohl (Austria)

2–2 on aggregate. Young Boys won on away goals.

4 November 1987

Ajax (Netherlands)	2–0	(West Germany) Hamburg
Mühren 13'; Meijer 83'	Report

Olympisch Stadion, Amsterdam
Attendance: 42,943
Referee: George Courtney (England)

Ajax won 3–0 on aggregate.

4 November 1987

Dinamo Minsk (Soviet Union)	0–0	(Spain) Real Sociedad
	Report

Dinamo Stadium, Minsk
Attendance: 50,000
Referee: Yusuf Namoğlu (Turkey)

1–1 on aggregate. Dinamo Minsk won on away goals.

4 November 1987

Atalanta (Italy)	2–0	(Greece) OFI
Nicolini 22'; Garlini 73'	Report

Stadio Atleti Azzurri d'Italia, Bergamo
Attendance: 13,329
Referee: Gérard Biguet (France)

Atalanta won 2–1 on aggregate.

5 November 1987

Hajduk Split (Socialist Federal Republic of Yugoslavia)	0–3 Awarded	(France) Marseille
Asanović 19' (pen.); Bursać 83'	Report

Stadion Poljud, Split
Attendance: 22,000
Referee: Dieter Pauly (West Germany)

The match was interrupted in the 10th minute with the score 0–0 due to tear gas being thrown in the stands by Hajduk fans. The resulting commotion was accompanied with the same fans throwing flares onto the pitch followed by a pitch invasion. The match was resumed some 15 minutes later and completed with Hajduk winning 2–0 on the night and Marseille advancing 4–2 on aggregate. At a disciplinary hearing several days later, UEFA voided the match due to the crowd trouble, awarding a 3–0 win to Marseille and banning Hajduk from European competition for two seasons.
Marseille won 7–0 on aggregate.

== Quarter-finals ==
Team 1	Agg.	Team 2	1st leg	2nd leg
KV Mechelen (Belgium)	2–1	(Soviet Union) Dinamo Minsk	1–0	1–1
Atalanta (Italy)	3–1	(Portugal) Sporting CP	2–0	1–1
RoPS (Finland)	0–4	(France) Marseille	0–1	0–3
Young Boys (Switzerland)	0–2	(Netherlands) Ajax	0–1	0–1

=== First leg ===
1 March 1988

KV Mechelen (Belgium)	1–0	(Soviet Union) Dinamo Minsk
De Wilde 86'	Report

Achter de Kazerne, Mechelen
Attendance: 5,466
Referee: Gerasimos Germanakos (Greece)

2 March 1988
19:00 CET

Atalanta (Italy)	2–0	(Portugal) Sporting CP
Nicolini 44' (pen.); Cantarutti 79'	Report

Stadio Atleti Azzurri d'Italia, Bergamo
Attendance: 25,049
Referee: Siegfried Kirschen (East Germany)

1 March 1988

RoPS (Finland)	0–1	(France) Marseille
	Report	Papin 26'

Stadio Via del Mare, Lecce
Attendance: 1,631
Referee: Velichko Tsonchev (Bulgaria)

9 March 1988

Young Boys (Switzerland)	0–1	(Netherlands) Ajax
	Report	Bosman 44'

Stadion Wankdorf, Bern
Attendance: 7,686
Referee: Emilio Soriano Aladrén (Spain)

=== Second leg ===
15 March 1988

Dinamo Minsk (Soviet Union)	1–1	(Belgium) KV Mechelen
Kisten 59'	Report	Ohana 29'

Dinamo Stadium, Minsk
Attendance: 44,430
Referee: Henning Lund-Sørensen (Denmark)

Mechelen won 2–1 on aggregate.

15 March 1988

Sporting CP (Portugal)	1–1	(Italy) Atalanta
Houtman 66'	Report	Cantarutti 82'

Estádio José Alvalade, Lisbon
Attendance: 40,000
Referee: Horst Brummeier (Austria)

Atalanta won 3–1 on aggregate.

15 March 1988

Marseille (France)	3–0	(Finland) RoPS
Genghini 18'; Allofs 22'; Papin 76' (pen.)	Report

Stade Vélodrome, Marseille
Attendance: 16,016
Referee: Vítor Fernandes (Portugal)

Marseille won 4–0 on aggregate.

16 March 1988

Ajax (Netherlands)	1–0	(Switzerland) Young Boys
Larsson 39'	Report

De Meer Stadion, Amsterdam
Attendance: 18,955
Referee: Valeri Butenko (Soviet Union)

Ajax won 2–0 on aggregate.

== Semi-finals ==
Team 1	Agg.	Team 2	1st leg	2nd leg
KV Mechelen (Belgium)	4–2	(Italy) Atalanta	2–1	2–1
Marseille (France)	2–4	(Netherlands) Ajax	0–3	2–1

=== First leg ===
6 April 1988

KV Mechelen (Belgium)	2–1	(Italy) Atalanta
Ohana 7' den Boer 83'	Report	Strömberg 8'

Achter de Kazerne, Mechelen
Attendance: 11,700
Referee: Emilio Soriano Aladrén (Spain)

6 April 1988

Marseille (France)	0–3	(Netherlands) Ajax
	Report	Rob Witschge 12', 42'; Bergkamp 89'

Stade Vélodrome, Marseille
Attendance: 42,584
Referee: Ioan Igna (Romania)

=== Second leg ===
20 April 1988

Atalanta (Italy)	1–2	(Belgium) KV Mechelen
Garlini 39' (pen.)	Report	Rutjes 57'; Emmers 80'

Stadio Atleti Azzurri d'Italia, Bergamo
Attendance: 37,500
Referee: Valeri Butenko (Soviet Union)

Mechelen won 4–2 on aggregate.

20 April 1988

Ajax (Netherlands)	1–2	(France) Marseille
Larsson 23'	Report	Papin 67'; Allofs 90'

Olympisch Stadion, Amsterdam
Attendance: 30,463
Referee: Siegfried Kirschen (East Germany)

Ajax won 4–2 on aggregate.

== Final ==
11 May 1988

KV Mechelen (Belgium)	1–0	(Netherlands) Ajax
den Boer 53'	Report

Stade de la Meinau, Strasbourg
Attendance: 39,446
Referee: Dieter Pauly (West Germany)

== Top scorers ==
The top scorers from the 1987–88 UEFA Cup Winners' Cup are as follows:

Rank	Name	Team	Goals
1	(Brazil) Paulinho Cascavel	(Portugal) Sporting CP	6
2	(West Germany) Klaus Allofs	(France) Olympique Marseille	4
2	(Netherlands) Piet den Boer	(Belgium) KV Mechelen	4
2	(Israel) Eli Ohana	(Belgium) KV Mechelen	4
2	(France) Jean-Pierre Papin	(France) Olympique Marseille	4
2	(England) Tony Sealy	(Portugal) Sporting CP	4
7	(Netherlands) Remco Boere	(Netherlands) Den Haag	3
7	(Italy) Aldo Cantarutti	(Italy) Atalanta	3
7	(Italy) Oliviero Garlini	(Italy) Atalanta	3
7	(West Germany) Bruno Labbadia	(West Germany) Hamburg	3
7	(Czechoslovakia) Juraj Majoroš	(Czechoslovakia) Dunajská Streda	3
7	(Netherlands) Henny Meijer	(Netherlands) Ajax	3
7	(Switzerland) Dario Zuffi	(Switzerland) Young Boys	3
