= Pierre Drouguet =

Belgian footballer

Personal information
- Full name: Pierre Drouguet
- Date of birth: 2 May 1962 (age 64)
- Place of birth: Verviers, Belgium
- Position: Goalkeeper

Senior career*
Years	Team	Apps	(Gls)
1981–1987	RFC Liège	90	(0)
1987–1989	KV Mechelen	0	(0)
1989–1993	KV Kortrijk	123	(0)
1993–1995	Beerschot AC	62	(0)
1995–1997	KV Mechelen	56	(0)
1997–1999	FC Turnhout		
1999–2003	R.C.S. Verviétois	96	(0)
Total		427	(0)
- * Club domestic league appearances and goals

Pierre Drouguet (born 2 May 1962) is a Belgian former footballer who played as a goalkeeper.

== Honours ==
=== Player ===
==== RFC Liège ====
- Belgian League Cup: 1986
- Belgian Cup: 1986–87 (runners-up)

==== KV Mechelen ====
- Belgian First Division: 1988–89
- European Cup Winners Cup: 1987–88 (winners)
- European Super Cup: 1988
