= Wim Hofkens =

Dutch footballer

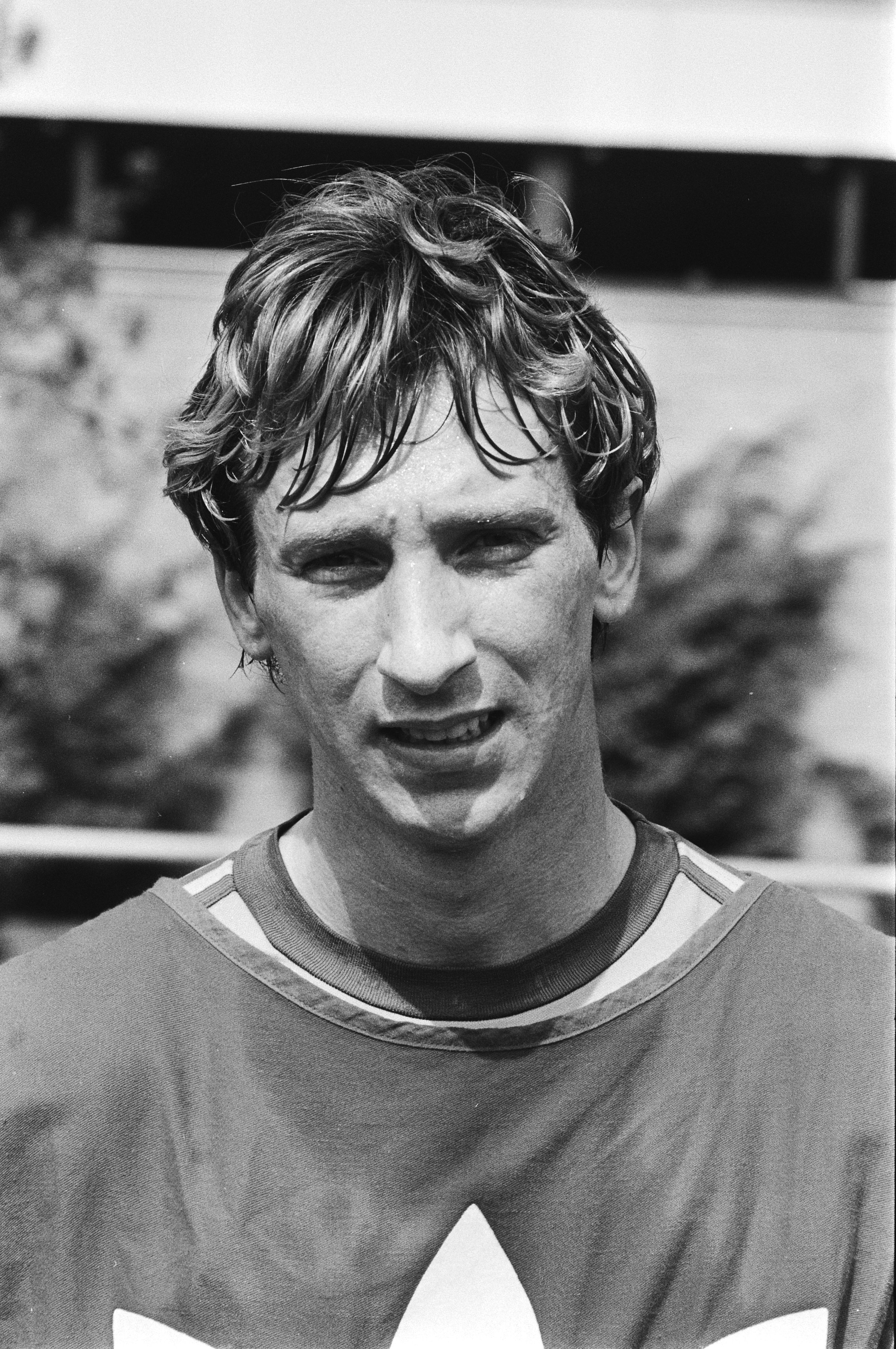

Personal information
- Full name: Wilhelmus Hofkens
- Date of birth: 27 March 1958 (age 68)
- Place of birth: Made, North Brabant, Netherlands
- Positions: Defender; midfielder

Youth career
- Madese Boys

Senior career*
Years	Team	Apps	(Gls)
1974–1976	Willem II	55	(6)
1976–1980	Beveren	122	(9)
1980–1985	Anderlecht	114	(4)
1985–1986	Beerschot	32	(2)
1986–1991	Mechelen	109	(6)
1991–1992	Kortrijk	18	(1)
1992–1993	AZ	24	(1)
Total		474	(29)

International career
1978–1981	Netherlands U21	8	(1)
1983–1989	Netherlands	5	(0)
- * Club domestic league appearances and goals

Wim Hofkens (born 27 March 1958) is a retired football player who played five games for the Dutch national side.

Hofkens is one of the Dutch football players to be selected for the national team while never having played in the Dutch Eredivisie. The others capped players are Jordi Cruyff, Jerrel Hasselbaink, Timothy Fosu-Mensah, Willi Lippens, Rob Reekers, Bart Verbruggen, Mark Flekken, Joshua Zirkzee, Jeremie Frimpong, Ian Maatsen, Micky van de Ven and Nathan Aké.

== Club career ==
Born in Made, Hofkens started his professional career at Willem II before spending 16 years in the Belgian top tier where he won 4 league titles and 2 domestic cups. He also won the 1988 European Cup Winners' Cup with KV Mechelen. He finished his career at AZ.

== International career ==
Hofkens also played 8 games for the Netherlands national under-21 football team.

== Honours ==
=== Club ===
Beveren

- Belgian First Division : 1978–79
- Belgian Cup: 1977–78
- Belgian Supercup: 1979

RSC Anderlecht

- Belgian First Division: 1980–81, 1984–85
- UEFA Cup: 1982–83 (winners), 1983-84 (runners-up)
- Jules Pappaert Cup: 1983, 1985

KV Mechelen

- Belgian First Division: 1988–89
- Belgian Cup: 1986–87 (winners), 1990-91 (runners-up), 1991-92 (runners-up)
- European Cup Winners Cup: 1987–88 (winners)
- European Super Cup: 1988
- Amsterdam Tournament: 1989
- Joan Gamper Trophy: 1989
- Jules Pappaert Cup: 1990
