= Ron de Roode =

Dutch footballer (1965–2022)

Personal information
- Date of birth: 20 March 1965
- Place of birth: Leiden, Netherlands
- Date of death: 29 August 2022 (aged 57)
- Place of death: Leiden, Netherlands
- Position: Winger

Youth career
- Roodenburg

Senior career*
Years	Team	Apps	(Gls)
1982–1989	FC Den Haag	177	(53)
1989–1990	Willem II	32	(5)
1990–1995	Telstar	56	(14)
Total		265	(73)

International career
1981	Netherlands U-17	3	(0)
- * Club domestic league appearances and goals

Ron de Roode (20 March 1965 – 29 August 2022) was a Dutch footballer who played as a winger.

== Playing career ==
=== Club ===
Born in Leiden, de Roode started his career at local amateur side Roodenburg and joined FC Den Haag in 1982. He became an instant hit with the fans, due to his speed, dribbling skills and his deadly crosses and goals. Den Haag won the 1985–86 Eerste Divisie title undefeated with de Roode scoring 16 goals in that season. He totalled 53 goals in 177 league games for the club, as well as 8 goals in 23 domestic cup matches and 1 goal in 4 Cup Winners' Cup matches.

In 1989, de Roode moved to Willem II, but did not become a regular starter for the club. He played a total of 32 league matches for them, scoring 6 goals.

He joined Eerste Divisie outfit Telstar in late 1990, scoring 41 goals in 98 matches in all competitions for them. While playing for Telstar, he was diagnosed with testicular cancer which effectively ended his professional career.

=== International ===
De Roode earned three caps for the Netherlands U17 national team in 1981.

== Managerial career ==
After retiring as a player, de Roode coached at amateur sides LFC, Stompwijk’92, UVS and DoCoS.
