= 1987 Intertoto Cup =

In the 1987 Intertoto Cup no knock-out rounds were contested, and therefore no winner was declared.

== Group stage ==
The teams were divided into eight groups of four teams each.

=== Group 1 ===
Pos	Team	Pld	W	D	L	GF	GA	GD	Pts	JEN	AGF	VAS	LS
1	(East Germany) Carl Zeiss Jena	6	2	3	1	10	6	+4	7	—	2–2	2–2	3–0
2	(Denmark) AGF	6	2	3	1	8	7	+1	7	1–1	—	1–0	2–1
3	(Hungary) Vasas	6	2	1	3	10	11	−1	5	0–2	2–1	—	5–3
4	(Switzerland) Lausanne-Sport	6	2	1	3	8	12	−4	5	1–0	1–1	2–1	—

Source: Pawel Mogielnicki's Page
Rules for classification: 1) Points; 2) Goal difference; 3) Goals scored; 4) Head-to-head points; 5) Away goals scored; 6) Draw.

=== Group 2 ===
Pos	Team	Pld	W	D	L	GF	GA	GD	Pts	PSZ	MAG	HAM	CDF
1	(Poland) Pogoń Szczecin	6	5	0	1	20	8	+12	10	—	3–1	3–0	6–3
2	(East Germany) Magdeburg	6	3	1	2	9	6	+3	7	2–1	—	0–0	5–1
3	(Sweden) Hammarby	6	3	1	2	8	8	0	7	2–3	1–0	—	2–1
4	(Switzerland) La Chaux-de-Fonds	6	0	0	6	6	21	−15	0	0–4	0–1	1–3	—

Source: Pawel Mogielnicki's Page
Rules for classification: 1) Points; 2) Goal difference; 3) Goals scored; 4) Head-to-head points; 5) Away goals scored; 6) Draw.

=== Group 3 ===
Pos	Team	Pld	W	D	L	GF	GA	GD	Pts
1	(East Germany) Wismut Aue	6	2	4	0	13	9	+4	8
2	(Bulgaria) Spartak Varna	6	2	3	1	10	10	0	7
3	(Hungary) Újpesti Dózsa	6	2	1	3	12	13	−1	5
4	(Sweden) Halmstad	6	1	2	3	7	10	−3	4

=== Group 4 ===
Pos	Team	Pld	W	D	L	GF	GA	GD	Pts	TAT	NÆS	BEL	DAC
1	(Hungary) Tatabánya	6	5	0	1	16	3	+13	10	—	3–1	2–0	6–1
2	(Denmark) Næstved	6	3	1	2	16	13	+3	7	0–4	—	7–0	3–2
3	(Switzerland) Bellinzona	6	2	0	4	5	16	−11	4	1–0	2–3	—	2–0
4	(Czechoslovakia) DAC Dunajská Streda	6	1	1	4	9	14	−5	3	0–1	2–2	4–0	—

Source: Pawel Mogielnicki's Page
Rules for classification: 1) Points; 2) Goal difference; 3) Goals scored; 4) Head-to-head points; 5) Away goals scored; 6) Draw.

=== Group 5 ===
Pos	Team	Pld	W	D	L	GF	GA	GD	Pts	MAL	GCZ	VID	B05
1	(Sweden) Malmö	6	3	1	2	12	5	+7	7	—	2–0	4–0	3–0
2	(Switzerland) Grasshopper Club	6	2	3	1	10	9	+1	7	2–2	—	3–3	3–1
3	(Hungary) Videoton	6	2	1	3	9	11	−2	5	1–0	0–1	—	4–1
4	(Czechoslovakia) Bohemians Prague	6	2	1	3	7	13	−6	5	2–1	1–1	2–1	—

Source: Pawel Mogielnicki's Page
Rules for classification: 1) Points; 2) Goal difference; 3) Goals scored; 4) Head-to-head points; 5) Away goals scored; 6) Draw.

=== Group 6 ===
Pos	Team	Pld	W	D	L	GF	GA	GD	Pts
1	(Sweden) AIK	6	3	2	1	9	3	+6	8
2	(Czechoslovakia) Plastika Nitra	6	3	1	2	8	7	+1	7
3	(Denmark) Lyngby	6	2	1	3	5	10	−5	5
4	(Poland) Lech Poznań	6	1	2	3	5	7	−2	4

=== Group 7 ===
Pos	Team	Pld	W	D	L	GF	GA	GD	Pts
1	(Bulgaria) Etar Veliko Tarnovo	6	3	1	2	13	7	+6	7
2	(Czechoslovakia) RH Cheb	6	2	3	1	9	9	0	7
3	(Sweden) IFK Norrköping	6	2	2	2	10	10	0	6
4	(East Germany) Rot-Weiss Erfurt	6	1	2	3	5	11	−6	4

=== Group 8 ===
Pos	Team	Pld	W	D	L	GF	GA	GD	Pts
1	(Denmark) Brøndby	6	6	0	0	21	4	+17	12
2	(West Germany) VfL Bochum	6	2	2	2	9	6	+3	6
3	(Israel) Beitar Jerusalem	6	2	1	3	3	11	−8	5
4	(Israel) Bnei Yehuda	6	0	1	5	4	16	−12	1

== See also ==
- 1987–88 European Cup
- 1987–88 European Cup Winners' Cup
- 1987–88 UEFA Cup
