= Paul De Mesmaeker =

Belgian footballer

Personal information
- Date of birth: 12 August 1963 (age 63)
- Place of birth: Oudenaarde, Belgium
- Position: Left midfielder

Senior career*
Years	Team	Apps	(Gls)
1981–1986	RWDM		
1986–1994	KV Mechelen		
1994–1995	Cappellen		
1995–1996	KFC Liedekerke		
1996–2000	SK Lombeek		
Total		349	(48)

International career
1981	Belgium U19	1	(0)
1987	Belgium	1	(0)
- * Club domestic league appearances and goals

Paul De Mesmaeker (born 8 September 1963) is a Belgian former professional footballer who played as a left midfielder.

== Honours ==
KV Mechelen

- European Cup Winners' Cup: 1987-88
- European Super Cup: 1988
