= Piet den Boer =

Dutch footballer (born 1958)

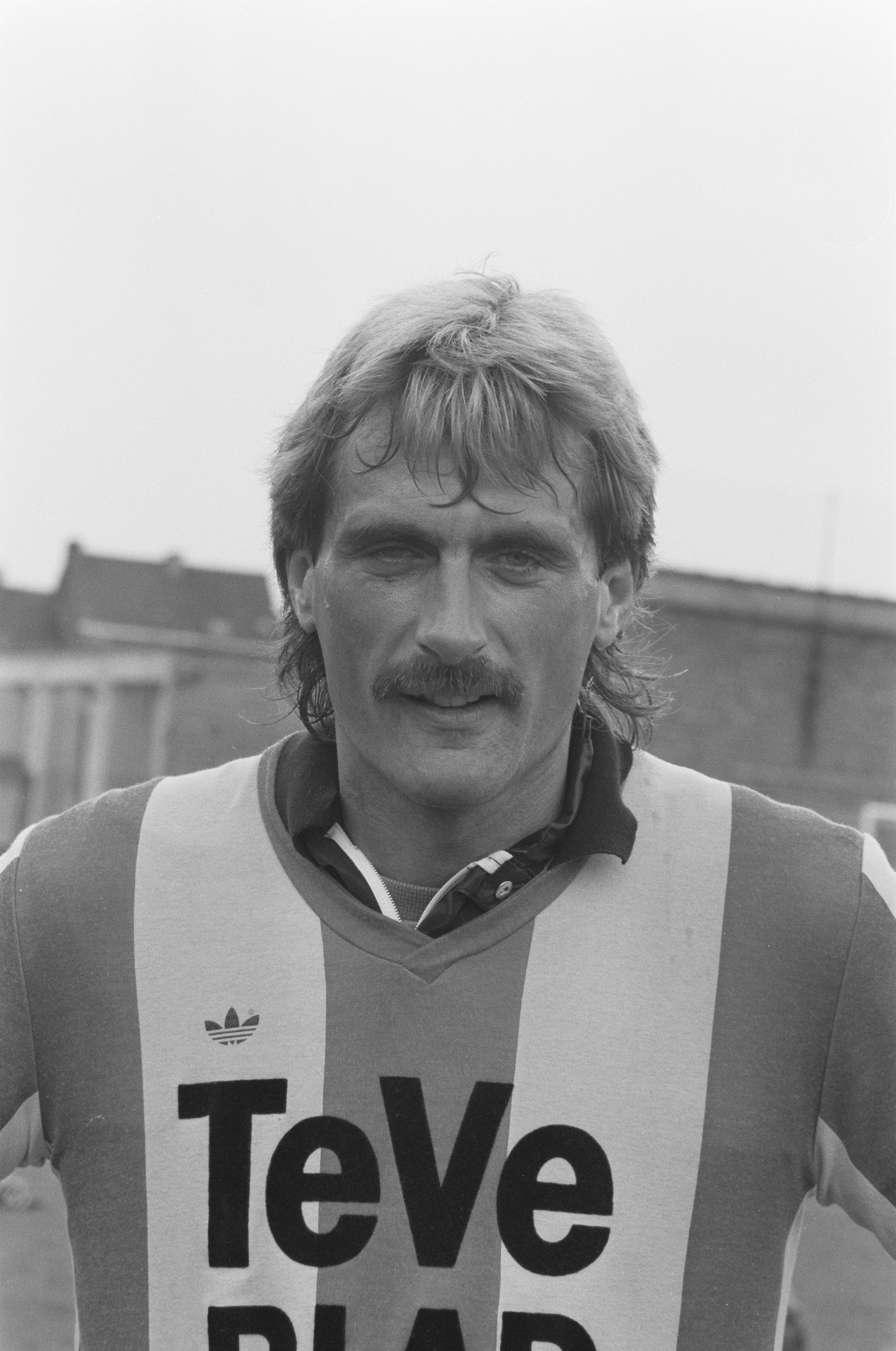

Personal information
- Full name: Pieter den Boer
- Date of birth: 17 March 1958 (age 68)
- Place of birth: Rotterdam, Netherlands
- Height: 1.88 m (6 ft 2 in)
- Position: Forward

Youth career
- CVV
- Xerxes

Senior career*
Years	Team	Apps	(Gls)
1981-1982	Excelsior	34	(26)
1982-1989	KV Mechelen	213	(88)
1989-1990	Girondins Bordeaux	37	(14)
1990-1991	Caen	34	(4)
1991-1993	Tielen	45	(22)
Total		363	(154)
- * Club domestic league appearances and goals

Piet den Boer (born 17 March 1958 in the Netherlands) is a Dutch retired footballer. He scored the winning goal for Belgian side KV Mechelen in the 1988 European Cup Winners' Cup Final.

== Career ==
He started playing football at hometown club CVV in Rotterdam Charlois. The moustached Den Boer became top goalscorer of the Eerste Divisie with Excelsior in his first season as a professional and, despite winning promotion with the club, was lured to Belgian second tier side KV Mechelen with whom he also won promotion in his first season. He scored the only goal in the 1987 Belgian Cup final, which qualified Mechelen for the 1987-88 European Cup Winners' Cup.

Den Boer retired after spells in France and returned to Belgium to work as a private banker with ABN AMRO. He also wrote a couple of books and worked for IJsboerke and as an event organiser.

== Honours ==
=== Player ===
KV Mechelen

- Belgian Second Division: 1982–83
- Belgian First Division: 1988–89
- Belgian Cup: 1986–87
- European Cup Winners Cup: 1987–88 (winners)
- European Super Cup: 1988

=== Individual ===
- Dutch First Division: 1981-82 top scorer (26 goals)
