= Remco Boere =

Dutch footballer

- Boere with Excelsior in 1982

Personal information
- Full name: Remco Ernest Jan Boere
- Date of birth: 29 October 1961 (age 65)
- Place of birth: Rotterdam, Netherlands
- Height: 1.92 m (6 ft 4 in)
- Position: Forward

Youth career
- VV Spirit

Senior career*
Years	Team	Apps	(Gls)
1981–1982	Excelsior	14	(6)
1982–1983	Roda JC	9	(0)
1983–1984	Vitesse	31	(27)
1984–1985	Cambuur	33	(17)
1985–1988	Den Haag	85	(52)
1988–1989	Gent	15	(6)
1989–1991	Iraklis	37	(11)
1991–1992	Gil Vicente	8	(1)
1992–1996	FC Zwolle	92	(37)
Total		324	(157)

Managerial career
- 2004–2005: Al Jazira
- 2004: Al-Gharafa
- 2007: Qatar U20
- 2007–2009: Al-Arabi (technical director)
- 2009–2012: Västerås
- 2012: Köping FF
- 2012–2013: Al-Ahli (technical director)
- 2014–2015: Hammerfest
- 2018: Pathachakra
- * Club domestic league appearances and goals

Remco Boere (born 29 October 1961) is a Dutch former professional footballer who played as a forward.

== Playing career ==
A much-travelled forward, Boere started at amateur side VV Spirit and played professional football for Roda JC and FC Den Haag in the Eredivisie. He also played for Iraklis in the Super League Greece and Gil Vicente in the Portuguese Liga.

Boere finished his playing career with FC Zwolle of the Eerste Divisie, initially signing a two-year deal with the club in August 1992.

== Managerial career ==
After retiring as a player, Boere managed Dutch amateur sides Go Ahead Kampen and Nunspeet and worked for years in Qatar in different jobs. He then had a spell in Sweden with Köping FF and at Libyan giants Al-Ahli, before moving above the Arctic Circle to coach Norwegian fourth-tier outfit Hammerfest ahead of the 2014 season. In 2018 he was appointed manager of Indian side Pathachakra.

== Personal life ==
Boere lives in Sweden with his second, Swedish, wife and their son. He has four children from a previous marriage. He works at a local school.

His brother, Jeroen, was also a professional footballer who once played for English Premier League side West Ham United.

== Honours ==
=== Individual ===
- Eerste Divisie top scorer: 1983–84 (27 goals), 1985–86 (28 goals)
