= Tibor Mičinec =

Czech footballer

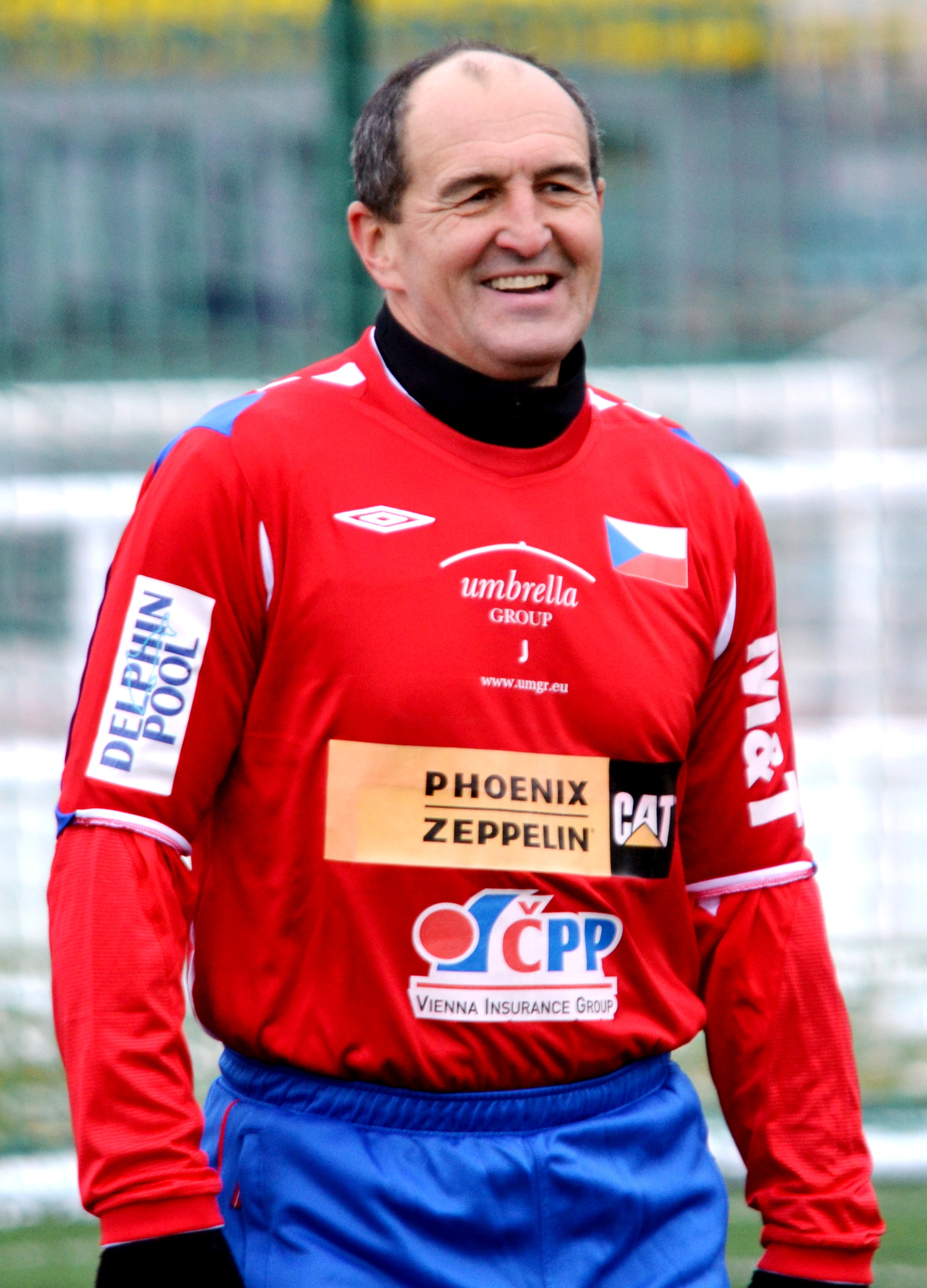
- Mičinec in 2013

Personal information
- Date of birth: 10 October 1958 (age 68)
- Place of birth: Kremnica, Czechoslovakia
- Height: 1.80 m (5 ft 11 in)
- Position: Forward

Senior career*
Years	Team	Apps	(Gls)
1980–1984	Bohemians 1905	61	(16)
1984	Zbrojovka Brno		
1984–1987	Bohemians 1905	78	(32)
1987–1989	DAC Dunajska Streda	50	(21)
1989–1991	AC Omonia		
1991	CD Logroñés	1	(0)
1992	Bohemians 1905	15	(5)
1993–1996	FK Švarc Benešov		
1996	FC Svit Zlín	16	(0)

International career
1984–1987	Czechoslovakia	7	(1)
- * Club domestic league appearances and goals

Tibor Mičinec (born 10 October 1958) is a retired Slovak footballer who played as a forward.

== Honours ==
- 1982–83 Czechoslovak First League
- 1988–89 Cypriot First Division
- 1990–91 Cypriot Cup
- Top scorer, 1993–94 Czech 2. Liga
