= Henny Meijer =

Dutch footballer

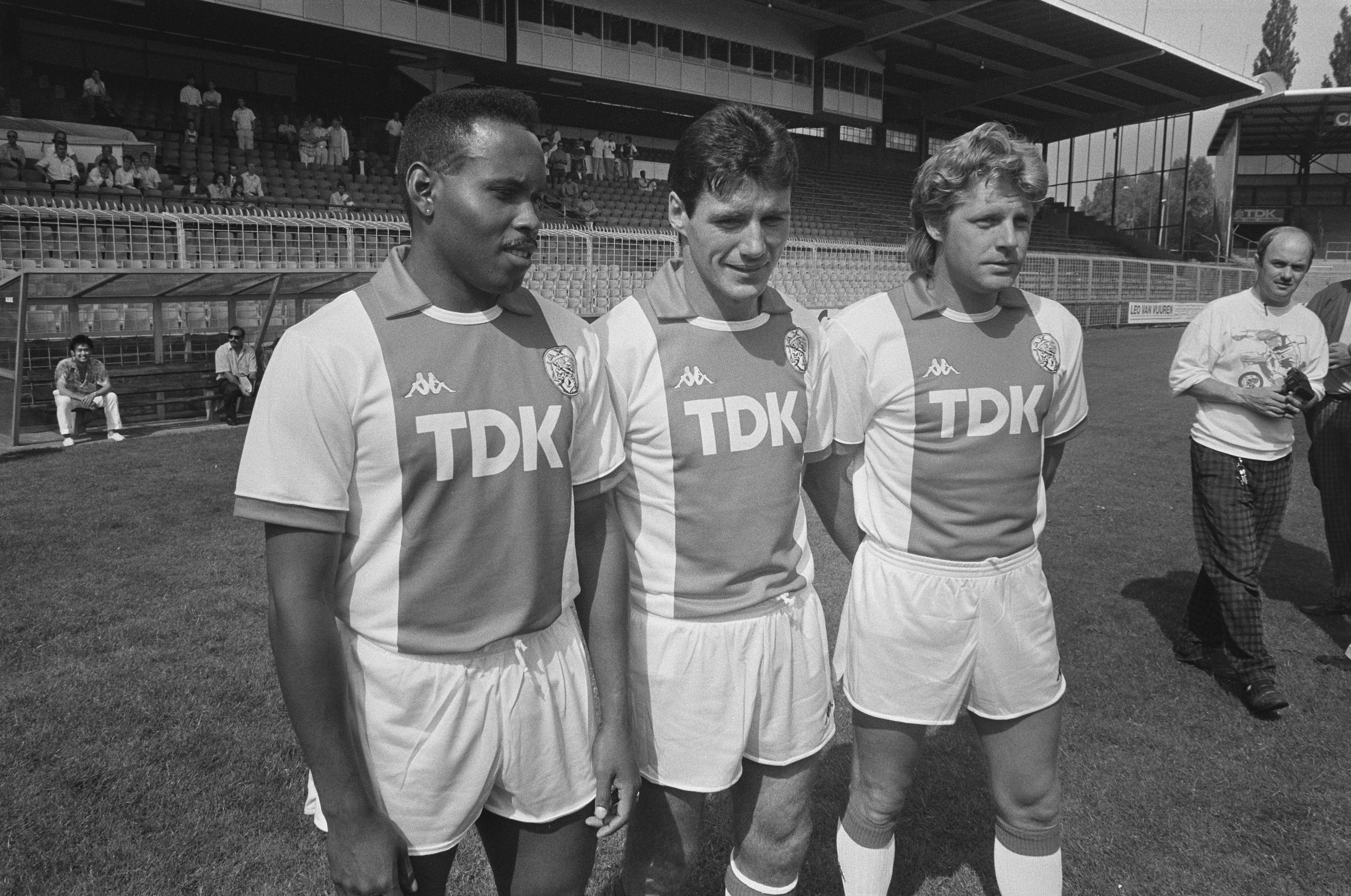
- Henny Meijer, Frank Stapleton and Jan Sorensen (1987)

Personal information
- Full name: Henny Ingemar Meijer
- Date of birth: 17 February 1962 (age 64)
- Place of birth: Paramaribo, Suriname
- Height: 1.82 m (6 ft 0 in)
- Position: Forward

Senior career*
Years	Team	Apps	(Gls)
1983–1984	Telstar	32	(20)
1984–1985	Volendam	33	(9)
1985–1987	Roda JC	65	(27)
1987–1988	Ajax	26	(11)
1988–1993	Groningen	146	(49)
1993	Verdy Kawasaki	11	(2)
1993–1994	Cambuur	25	(8)
1994–1995	Heerenveen	13	(2)
1996	De Graafschap	20	(5)
1996–1998	Veendam	49	(17)
Total		420	(150)

International career
1987	Netherlands	1	(0)
- * Club domestic league appearances and goals

Henny Ingemar Meijer (born 17 February 1962) is a Dutch former footballer who played as a forward.

Meijer was born in Paramaribo, Suriname.

He is famous for scoring the first ever J1 League goal in the 19th minute of a game against Yokohama Marinos on 15 May 1993.

== Career statistics ==
=== Club ===
Club	Season	League		
Club	Season	Division	Apps	Goals
Telstar	1983/84	Eerste Divisie	32	20
Volendam	1984/85	Eredivisie	33	9
Roda JC	1985/86	Eredivisie	31	8
Roda JC	1986/87	Eredivisie	34	19
Ajax	1987/88	Eredivisie	26	11
Groningen	1988/89	Eredivisie	34	15
Groningen	1989/90	Eredivisie	29	8
Groningen	1990/91	Eredivisie	34	12
Groningen	1991/92	Eredivisie	29	10
Groningen	1992/93	Eredivisie	20	4
Verdy Kawasaki	1993	J1 League	11	2
Cambuur	1993/94	Eredivisie	25	8
Heerenveen	1994/95	Eredivisie	13	2
De Graafschap	1995/96	Eredivisie	20	5
Veendam	1996/97	Eerste Divisie	32	14
Veendam	1997/98	Eerste Divisie	19	3
Total			422	150

=== International ===
Netherlands national team
Year	Apps	Goals
1987	1	0
Total	1	0

== Honours ==
J - League: 1993

J - League Cup: 1993
