= Petr Kašpar =

Czech footballer (born 1960)

Personal information
- Full name: Petr Kašpar
- Date of birth: 26 June 1960 (age 66)
- Place of birth: Kolín, Czechoslovakia
- Position: Right back

Senior career*
Years	Team	Apps	(Gls)
1983–1984	Slavia Prague		
1985–1986	AFK Kolín		
1986–1991	DAC Dunajská Streda		
1991–1992	Újpest		
1992–1995	DAC Dunajská Streda		
- * Club domestic league appearances and goals as of 3 August 2012

Petr Kašpar (born 26 June 1960) is a retired Czech football defender.

== Director manager career ==
He began his business career by trading fruit, clothing, and furniture from Hungary, which were exported to the Czech Republic. Later, he continued as a FK DAC 1904 Dunajská Streda club officer. He then moved to Artmedia Petržalka as club officer. Since 2010, he is a director general of ŠK Slovan Bratislava.
