= Merthyr Tydfil F.C. =

Welsh football club, 1945-2010

Merthyr Tydfil
- Full name: Merthyr Tydfil Football Club
- Nickname: The Martyrs
- Founded: 1945
- Dissolved: 2010; 16 years ago
- Ground: Penydarren Park, Merthyr Tydfil
- Capacity: 10,000 (1,500 seated)
- Chairman: Anthony Hughes
- Manager: Garry Shephard
- 2009–10: Southern League Premier Division, 17th
Home colours	Away colours

Merthyr Tydfil Football Club was a Welsh football club based at the Penydarren Park ground in Merthyr Tydfil. In 2010 the club was liquidated and reformed under the name Merthyr Town, which was accepted into Division One of the Western League.

== History ==
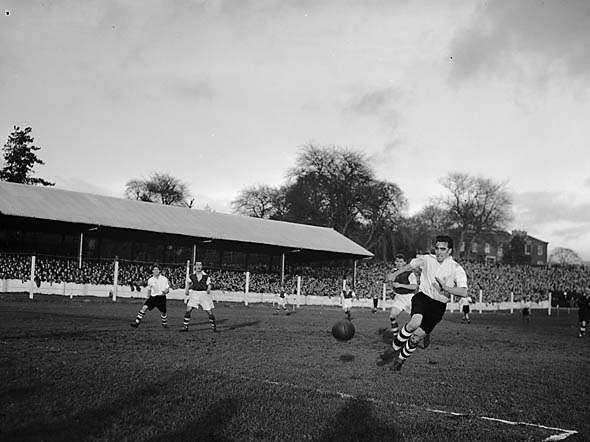
Merthyr against Ipswich Town in 1951

The club was formed in 1945, and joined the Welsh League. In their first season, they finished as runners-up, and joined the Southern League. The club were immensely successful in their first few seasons, winning the championship in 1947–48, 1949–50, 1950–51, 1951–52 and 1953–54. In the 1947–48 championship-winning season, Merthyr only dropped one point at home (against Colchester United) and only lost four games all season. However, despite their success, the club failed to be elected to the English Football League. The 1950–51 season ended with Merthyr winning the Southern League, the Welsh Cup, the Southern League Cup and the Welsh Challenge Cup.

After bouncing between the various Southern League divisions during the 1960s, 1970s and 1980s, the club finally won their sixth championship in 1988–89, making them joint Southern League title record-holders together with Southampton. This time, winning the championship meant promotion to the Football Conference, the fifth level of English football. The club finished ninth in their first two seasons, and then fourth. However, they then went into decline, and were relegated back to the Southern League in 1995, where they remained until reforming in 2010. They should have been relegated a season earlier, but were reprieved when Northern Premier League champions Marine failed to meet the stadium criteria for the league.

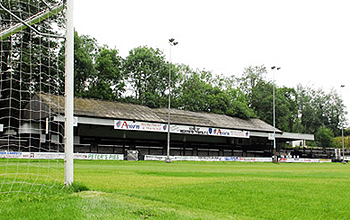
Penydarren Park, former home of Merthyr Tydfil Football Club

The club's best FA Cup performance was reaching the second round, which they managed in 1946–47 (losing 3–1 to Reading), 1954–55 (losing 7–1 to Bradford City), 1973–74 (losing 3–0 to Hendon), 1979–80 (losing 3–1 in a replay with Chesham United) and 1990–91 (losing 5–1 to Woking). The only time the club managed to defeat a Football League club in the FA Cup was in the first round of the 1946–47 cup, when they beat Bristol Rovers 3–1.

The club were considerably more successful in the Welsh Cup, which they won on three occasions: 1949 (beating Swansea Town 2–0), 1951 (beating Cardiff City 3–2 in a replay) and 1987 (beating Newport County 1–0 in a replay). In addition, the club finished as runners-up in 1947 and 1952.

After winning the final in 1987, the club were allowed to enter the European Cup Winners' Cup, at a time when English clubs were banned from European competition. In the first round, they were drawn against the Italian club Atalanta. The club managed a win in the first leg at home, beating the Italians 2–1. However, the return leg was lost 2–0, and the club was eliminated from the competition.

Historically, the club's biggest rivals are Gloucester City. The two clubs played over 120 times in their history, making it one of the most played Anglo-Welsh derbies in football. In the late 1990s and early 2000s Newport County were local rivals.

== Notable former players ==
For all players with a Wikipedia article see Category:Merthyr Tydfil F.C. players.

== Honours ==
=== League ===
- Southern League/Southern Football League Premier Division
  - Champions: 1947–48, 1949–50, 1950–51, 1951–52, 1953–54, 1988–89
  - Runners-up: 1952–53, 1997–98
- Southern League Division One
  - Runners-up: 1970–71
- Southern League Division One North
  - Runners-up: 1978–79
- Southern League Division One Midland
  - Champions: 1987–88
- Southern League Western Division
  - Champions: 2002–03
  - Champions 2014–15 Southern Football League Division 1 South & West
- Welsh Football League Division One
  - Runners-up: 1945–46

=== Cup ===
- Welsh Cup
  - Winners: 1949, 1951, 1987
  - Finalists: 1947, 1952
- Welsh Football League Cup
  - Winners: 1951, 1962, 1981
  - Finalists: 1983

== Club records ==
- Record Attendance: 21,000 vs. Reading, FA Cup second round, 1946
- Highest league position: 4th in Football Conference, 1991–92
- Most goals scored in a league season: 187 in the Welsh League, 1945–46
- Fewest goals conceded in a league season: 32 in the Southern League Western Division, 2002–03

=== Cup records ===
- Best FA Cup performance: Second round, 1946–47, 1954–55, 1973–74, 1979–80, 1990–91
- Best FA Trophy performance: Quarter-finals, 1977–78
