= Bruges derby =

Football rivalry between Club Brugge and Cercle Brugge

- Location: Bruges
- Teams: Cercle Brugge; Club Brugge
- First meeting: Unknown date, either 1899 or 1900
- Latest meeting: 23 August 2026; Belgian Pro League; Club Brugge 1–0 Cercle Brugge
- Stadiums: Jan Breydel Stadium

Statistics
- Total meetings: 184 (182 results known, 2 lost)
- Most wins: Club Brugge (109)
- All-time series: Cercle Brugge: 31; Drawn: 42; Club Brugge: 109; Unknown: 2
- Largest victory: Club Brugge 10–0 Cercle Brugge (17 January 1990)

The Bruges derby (Dutch: Brugse stadsderby, French: derby de Bruges) is a local football rivalry between two Belgian Pro League clubs Club Brugge and Cercle Brugge, who share the Jan Breydel Stadium in Bruges, Belgium.

The derby was first contested during the 1899–1900 season however the results of this season have been lost. The first known result was the following season in November 1900 and finished 0–0. The return fixture that season ended 2–2 but Cercle won the next five games before Club recorded their first victory with a 5–0 in October 1904. It would be the start of Club Brugge's dominance as they went on to win 13 of the next 19 pre-War fixtures, losing only two. Cercle Brugge were the more successful side of the two before the Second World War winning three championships and one cup to Club Brugge solitary championship.

Since the 1970s Club Brugge have become one of the most successful sides in Belgium winning a further 12 championships and a record 10 cups while Cercle have only added 3 more cups since, because of this many Club Brugge fans now see Anderlecht as their main rival. In the derby Club Brugge maintains a dramatically superior record often winning many consecutive games and have also recorded many high-scoring wins such as 8–1 in 1981 and their biggest ever victory against any opposition with a 10–0 win in 1991.

The derby is notable as for many years it was the only city-based derby regularly played in Belgium. Cities such as Antwerp, Brussels, and Liège had two or more successful sides but many of these had gone out of existence or play outside the top flight. In recent years, other cities have seen derbies reoccur at the highest level:

- the Antwerp derby was briefly contested by Antwerp and Beerschot from 2020 until 2022.
- the Liège derby between Seraing and Standard Liège from 2021 until 2023.
- the Brussels derby between Union SG and Anderlecht is now being played with both clubs at the highest level.

The match on 9 March 2025 made news as a brawl erupted after the game after Club Brugge player Ardon Jashari tried to plant a flag in the middle of the Jan Breydel Stadium's pitch.

== Head-to-head ==
As of 23 August 2026

Championship	Played	Cercle Brugge	Draws	Club Brugge	Cercle Brugge goals	Club Brugge goals
First Division	161	29	38	93	171	337
Second Division	12	1	3	8	5	26
Cup	8	2	0	6	8	19
Supercup	1	0	0	1	2	5
Total	182	32	41	109	186	387

== All-time results ==
=== League ===
Season and Division		Cercle Brugge vs Club Brugge				Club Brugge vs Cercle Brugge			
Season	Division	Date	Venue	Score	Attendance	Date	Venue	Score	Attendance
1899–1900	First Division	Results unknown							
1900–01	First Division	4 November 1900		0–0		27 January 1901		2–2	
1901–02	First Division	24 November 1901		3–1		23 March 1902	Albert Dyserynck Stadion	0–1	
1902–03	First Division	16 November 1902		3–2		12 October 1902	Albert Dyserynck Stadion	0–2	
1903–04	First Division	24 January 1904		1–1		18 October 1903	Albert Dyserynck Stadion	1–2	
1904–05	First Division	18 January 1905		2–5		9 October 1904	Albert Dyserynck Stadion	5–0	
1905–06	First Division	19 November 1905		2–2		11 March 1906	Albert Dyserynck Stadion	4–1	
1906–07	First Division	10 February 1907		0–0		21 October 1906	Albert Dyserynck Stadion	5–0	
1907–08	First Division	8 January 1908		1–2		6 October 1907	Albert Dyserynck Stadion	4–0	
1908–09	First Division	18 October 1908		2–4		17 January 1909	Albert Dyserynck Stadion	3–0	
1909–10	First Division	9 January 1910		4–0		16 October 1909	Albert Dyserynck Stadion	4–2	
1910–11	First Division	16 October 1910		0–3		26 March 1911	Albert Dyserynck Stadion	1–1	
1911–12	First Division	7 January 1912		2–5		8 October 1911	Albert Dyserynck Stadion	0–0	
1912–13	First Division	22 December 1913		2–0		8 September 1912	Albert Dyserynck Stadion	2–1	
1913–14	First Division	8 February 1914		1–2		9 November 1913	Albert Dyserynck Stadion	1–0	
1914–15	–	No official competition due to World War I							
1915–16	–	No official competition due to World War I							
1916–17	–	No official competition due to World War I							
1917–18	–	No official competition due to World War I							
1918–19	–	No official competition due to World War I							
1919–20	First Division	18 January 1920		2–2		2 November 1919	Albert Dyserynck Stadion	2–0	
1920–21	First Division	16 January 1921		0–2		24 October 1920	Albert Dyserynck Stadion	2–0	
1921–22	First Division	23 April 1922	Edgard De Smedt Stadion	2–3		2 October 1921	Albert Dyserynck Stadion	1–1	
1922–23	First Division	19 November 1922	Edgard De Smedt Stadion	1–0		?	Albert Dyserynck Stadion	2–2	
1923–24	First Division	11 November 1923	Edgard De Smedt Stadion	2–1		2 March 1924	Albert Dyserynck Stadion	2–0	
1924–25	First Division	25 January 1925	Edgard De Smedt Stadion	2–0		12 October 1924	Albert Dyserynck Stadion	1–1	
1925–26	First Division	23 January 1926	Edgard De Smedt Stadion	1–2		22 November 1925	Albert Dyserynck Stadion	1–2	
1926–27	Division d'Honneur	?	Edgard De Smedt Stadion	3–1		?	Albert Dyserynck Stadion	1–4	
1927–28	Division d'Honneur	25 March 1928	Edgard De Smedt Stadion	1–1		27 November 1927	Albert Dyserynck Stadion	0–1	
1928–29	–	Cercle Brugge playing in the Belgian First Division				Club Brugge playing in the Belgian Second Division			
1929–30	Division d'Honneur	8 September 1929	Edgard De Smedt Stadion	1–1		22 December 1930	Albert Dyserynck Stadion	1–2	
1930–31	Division d'Honneur	14 December 1931	Edgard De Smedt Stadion	2–0		15 March 1931	Albert Dyserynck Stadion	2–1	
1931–32	Division d'Honneur	20 December 1931	Edgard De Smedt Stadion	1–1		10 April 1932	Albert Dyserynck Stadion	4–2	
1932–33	Division d'Honneur	?	Edgard De Smedt Stadion	4–1		?	Albert Dyserynck Stadion	3–1	
1933–34	–	Cercle Brugge playing in the Belgian Second Division				Club Brugge playing in the Belgian First Division			
1934–35	–	Cercle Brugge playing in the Belgian Second Division				Club Brugge playing in the Belgian First Division			
1935–36	Division d'Honneur	?	Edgard De Smedt Stadion	0–0		?	Albert Dyserynck Stadion	2–1	
1936–37	–	Cercle Brugge playing in the Belgian Second Division				Club Brugge playing in the Belgian First Division			
1937–38	–	Cercle Brugge playing in the Belgian Second Division				Club Brugge playing in the Belgian First Division			
1938–39	Division d'Honneur	18 December 1939	Edgard De Smedt Stadion	1–1		18 September 1938	Albert Dyserynck Stadion	2–2	
1939–40	–	Cercle Brugge playing in the Belgian First Division				Club Brugge playing in the Belgian Second Division			
1940–41	–	No official competition due to World War II							
1941–42	–	Cercle Brugge playing in the Belgian First Division				Club Brugge playing in the Belgian Second Division			
1942–43	–	Cercle Brugge playing in the Belgian First Division				Club Brugge playing in the Belgian Second Division			
1943–44	–	Cercle Brugge playing in the Belgian First Division				Club Brugge playing in the Belgian Second Division			
1944–45	–	No official competition due to World War II							
1945–46	–	Cercle Brugge playing in the Belgian First Division				Club Brugge playing in the Belgian Second Division			
1946–47	–	Cercle Brugge playing in the Belgian Second Division				Club Brugge playing in the Belgian First Division			
1947–48	Second Division	26 October 1947	Edgard De Smedt Stadion	1–1	15,000	29 February 1948	Albert Dyserynck Stadion	2–1	18,000
1948–49	Second Division	13 February 1949	Edgard De Smedt Stadion	0–0		3 October 1948	Albert Dyserynck Stadion	6–0	
1949–50	–	Cercle Brugge playing in the Belgian Second Division				Club Brugge playing in the Belgian First Division			
1950–51	–	Cercle Brugge playing in the Belgian Second Division				Club Brugge playing in the Belgian First Division			
1951–52	Second Division	2 March 1952	Edgard De Smedt Stadion	1–4		7 October 1951	Albert Dyserynck Stadion	2–0	
1952–53	–	Cercle Brugge playing in the Belgian Third Division				Club Brugge playing in the Belgian Second Division			
1953–54	–	Cercle Brugge playing in the Belgian Third Division				Club Brugge playing in the Belgian Second Division			
1954–55	–	Cercle Brugge playing in the Belgian Third Division				Club Brugge playing in the Belgian Second Division			
1955–56	–	Cercle Brugge playing in the Belgian Third Division				Club Brugge playing in the Belgian Second Division			
1956–57	Second Division	17 February 1957	Edgard De Smedt Stadion	1–0		?	Albert Dyserynck Stadion	3–1	
1957–58	Second Division	27 October 1957	Edgard De Smedt Stadion	0–5		26 January 1958	Albert Dyserynck Stadion	1–0	
1958–59	Second Division	15 February 1959	Edgard De Smedt Stadion	0–2		19 October 1958	Albert Dyserynck Stadion	0–0	
1959–60	–	Cercle Brugge playing in the Belgian Second Division				Club Brugge playing in the Belgian First Division			
1960–61	–	Cercle Brugge playing in the Belgian Second Division				Club Brugge playing in the Belgian First Division			
1961–62	First Division	?	Edgard De Smedt Stadion	0–2		?	Albert Dyserynck Stadion	1–1	
1962–63	First Division	?	Edgard De Smedt Stadion	0–2		?	Albert Dyserynck Stadion	1–3	
1963–64	First Division	?	Edgard De Smedt Stadion	2–1		?	Albert Dyserynck Stadion	1–1	
1964–65	First Division	14 March 1965	Edgard De Smedt Stadion	0–3		15 November 1964	Albert Dyserynck Stadion	1–1	
1965–66	First Division	21 November 1965	Edgard De Smedt Stadion	2–2		27 February 1966	Albert Dyserynck Stadion	2–1	
1966–67	–	Cercle Brugge playing in the Belgian Second Division				Club Brugge playing in the Belgian First Division			
1967–68	–	Cercle Brugge playing in the Belgian Second Division				Club Brugge playing in the Belgian First Division			
1968–69	–	Cercle Brugge playing in the Belgian Second Division				Club Brugge playing in the Belgian First Division			
1969–70	–	Cercle Brugge playing in the Belgian Second Division				Club Brugge playing in the Belgian First Division			
1970–71	–	Cercle Brugge playing in the Belgian Second Division				Club Brugge playing in the Belgian First Division			
1971–72	First Division	20 February 1972	Edgard De Smedt Stadion	1–0		10 October 1971	Albert Dyserynck Stadion	1–1	
1972–73	First Division	22 October 1972	Edgard De Smedt Stadion	0–5		4 March 1973	Albert Dyserynck Stadion	2–2	
1973–74	First Division	10 March 1974	Edgard De Smedt Stadion	1–4		20 October 1973	Albert Dyserynck Stadion	3–1	
1974–75	First Division	24 November 1974	Edgard De Smedt Stadion	0–2		29 March 1975	Albert Dyserynck Stadion	2–0	
1975–76	First Division	8 February 1976	Olympiastadion	1–5		18 October 1975	Olympiastadion	1–0	
1976–77	First Division	16 October 1976	Olympiastadion	2–2		20 February 1977	Olympiastadion	2–0	
1977–78	First Division	15 February 1978	Olympiastadion	1–3		18 September 1977	Olympiastadion	4–1	
1978–79	–	Cercle Brugge playing in the Belgian Second Division				Club Brugge playing in the Belgian First Division			
1979–80	First Division	16 March 1980	Olympiastadion	2–3	21,000	4 November 1979	Olympiastadion	2–0	20,000
1980–81	First Division	27 September 1980	Olympiastadion	1–2	21,000	14 February 1981	Olympiastadion	8–1	19,000
1981–82	First Division	7 February 1982	Olympiastadion	2–2	17,000	4 October 1981	Olympiastadion	2–3	18,000
1982–83	First Division	25 August 1982	Olympiastadion	0–1	22,000	14 May 1983	Olympiastadion	1–1	22,000
1983–84	First Division	29 April 1984	Olympiastadion	0–5	17,000	7 September 1983	Olympiastadion	1–0	22,000
1984–85	First Division	5 May 1985	Olympiastadion	0–2	15,000	2 September 1984	Olympiastadion	6–1	16,000
1985–86	First Division	4 September 1985	Olympiastadion	0–1	15,000	26 January 1986	Olympiastadion	3–1	16,000
1986–87	First Division	27 September 1986	Olympiastadion	1–2	18,000	28 February 1987	Olympiastadion	2–0	16,000
1987–88	First Division	31 January 1988	Olympiastadion	0–2	17,000	2 September 1987	Olympiastadion	4–3	18,000
1988–89	First Division	20 November 1988	Olympiastadion	3–1	12,000	23 April 1989	Olympiastadion	4–2	14,000
1989–90	First Division	29 April 1990	Olympiastadion	0–2	20,000	3 December 1989	Olympiastadion	2–1	20,000
1990–91	First Division	27 September 1990	Olympiastadion	0–1	13,000	27 January 1991	Olympiastadion	10–0	15,000
1991–92	First Division	24 May 1992	Olympiastadion	5–5	21,000	15 December 1991	Olympiastadion	1–1	14,000
1992–93	First Division	21 November 1992	Olympiastadion	3–1	12,000	16 April 1993	Olympiastadion	1–3	10,000
1993–94	First Division	17 October 1993	Olympiastadion	2–4	11,000	9 April 1994	Olympiastadion	2–0	11,000
1994–95	First Division	5 February 1995	Olympiastadion	0–4	8,500	11 April 1994	Olympiastadion	4–0	11,000
1995–96	First Division	4 April 1996	Olympiastadion	1–2	15,000	22 October 1995	Olympiastadion	2–2	15,000
1996–97	First Division	16 November 1996	Olympiastadion	0–2	6,000	10 May 1997	Olympiastadion	3–0	14,000
1997–98	–	Cercle Brugge playing in the Belgian Second Division				Club Brugge playing in the Belgian First Division			
1998–99	–	Cercle Brugge playing in the Belgian Second Division				Club Brugge playing in the Belgian First Division			
1999–2000	–	Cercle Brugge playing in the Belgian Second Division				Club Brugge playing in the Belgian First Division			
2000–01	–	Cercle Brugge playing in the Belgian Second Division				Club Brugge playing in the Belgian First Division			
2001–02	–	Cercle Brugge playing in the Belgian Second Division				Club Brugge playing in the Belgian First Division			
2002–03	–	Cercle Brugge playing in the Belgian Second Division				Club Brugge playing in the Belgian First Division			
2003–04	First Division	17 August 2003	Jan Breydel Stadium	0–2	13,500	25 January 2004	Jan Breydel Stadium	5–0	24,600
2004–05	First Division	20 February 2005	Jan Breydel Stadium	1–2	12,450	19 September 2004	Jan Breydel Stadium	5–0	27,000
2005–06	First Division	27 November 2005	Jan Breydel Stadium	0–1	16,000	23 April 2006	Jan Breydel Stadium	2–0	26,100
2006–07	First Division	19 May 2006	Jan Breydel Stadium	1–0	19,093	14 January 2007	Jan Breydel Stadium	3–3	26,391
2007–08	First Division	9 November 2007	Jan Breydel Stadium	1–2	27,500	13 April 2008	Jan Breydel Stadium	1–0	27,797
2008–09	First Division	8 March 2009	Jan Breydel Stadium	1–3	23,163	19 October 2008	Jan Breydel Stadium	3–1	27,137
2009–10	Pro League	30 August 2009	Jan Breydel Stadium	2–3	20,407	26 December 2009	Jan Breydel Stadium	1–0	25,225
2010–11	Pro League	15 August 2010	Jan Breydel Stadium	3–1	17,835	21 November 2010	Jan Breydel Stadium	0–1	23,500
2011–12	Pro League	18 March 2012	Jan Breydel Stadium	1–2	19,295	20 November 2011	Jan Breydel Stadium	1–0	26,399
2012–13	Pro League	28 February 2013	Jan Breydel Stadium	0–3	13,499	23 September 2012	Jan Breydel Stadium	4–0	25,344
2013–14	Pro League	30 October 2013	Jan Breydel Stadium	2–0	14,500	15 March 2014	Jan Breydel Stadium	2–0	29,042
2014–15	Pro League	25 January 2015	Jan Breydel Stadium	0–3	14,500	15 August 2014	Jan Breydel Stadium	1–1	22,000
2015–16	–	Cercle Brugge playing in the Belgian Second Division/Belgian First Division B				Club Brugge playing in the Belgian First Division/Belgian First Division A			
2016–17	–	Cercle Brugge playing in the Belgian Second Division/Belgian First Division B				Club Brugge playing in the Belgian First Division/Belgian First Division A			
2017–18	–	Cercle Brugge playing in the Belgian Second Division/Belgian First Division B				Club Brugge playing in the Belgian First Division/Belgian First Division A			
2018–19	First Division A	2 February 2019	Jan Breydel Stadium	2–2	13,222	29 September 2018	Jan Breydel Stadium	4–0	27,871
2019–20	First Division A	14 September 2019	Jan Breydel Stadium	0–2	12,120	7 March 2020	Jan Breydel Stadium	2–1	28,593
2020–21	First Division A	28 January 2021	Jan Breydel Stadium	1–2	0	27 September 2020	Jan Breydel Stadium	2–1	9,500
2021–22	First Division A	26 December 2021	Jan Breydel Stadium	2–0	0	6 August 2021	Jan Breydel Stadium	1–1	10,000
2022–23	Pro League	19 February 2023	Jan Breydel Stadium	2–2	12,488	3 September 2022	Jan Breydel Stadium	4–0	23,243
2023–24	PL regular season	18 February 2024	Jan Breydel Stadium	1–1	14,967	12 November 2023	Jan Breydel Stadium	0–0	24,323
2023–24	PL championship playoffs	1 April 2024	Jan Breydel Stadium	1–1	8,762	26 May 2024	Jan Breydel Stadium	0–0	27,645
2024–25	Pro League	9 March 2025	Jan Breydel Stadium	1–3	10,806	1 September 2024	Jan Breydel Stadium	3–0	24,398
2025–26	Pro League	15 February 2026	Jan Breydel Stadium	1–2	11,090	9 August 2025	Jan Breydel Stadium	2–0	23,424
2026–27	Pro League	30 April 2027	Jan Breydel Stadium			23 August 2026	Jan Breydel Stadium	1–0	

=== Cup ===
Season	Competition	Round	Date	Stadium	Home team	Score	Away team	Attendance
1954–55	Belgian Cup	Round of 16	9 May 1955	Albert Dyserynck Stadion	Club Brugge	2–1	Cercle Brugge	
1977–78	Belgian Cup	Quarter-final	25 February 1978	Olympiastadion	Cercle Brugge	1–4	Club Brugge	
1985–86	Belgian Cup	Final	3 May 1986	Heysel Stadium	Club Brugge	3–0	Cercle Brugge	28,000
1995–96	Belgian Cup	Final	26 May 1996	Heysel Stadium	Club Brugge	2–1	Cercle Brugge	30,000
1996–97	Belgian Super Cup	Super Cup	22 January 1997	Heysel Stadium	Club Brugge	5–2	Cercle Brugge	28,000
2007–08	Belgian Cup	Round of 16	14 January 2008	Jan Breydel Stadium	Cercle Brugge	1–0	Club Brugge	14,352
2012–13	Belgian Cup	Round of 16	28 November 2012	Jan Breydel Stadium	Club Brugge	0–1	Cercle Brugge	4,000
2014–15	Belgian Cup	Semi-final 1st leg	4 February 2015	Jan Breydel Stadium	Club Brugge	5–1	Cercle Brugge	16,000
2014–15	Belgian Cup	Semi-final 2nd leg	11 February 2015	Jan Breydel Stadium	Cercle Brugge	2–3	Club Brugge	3,000

== Records ==
=== Trends ===
- Most games won in a row (Club Brugge): 11, 7 September 1983 to 31 January 1988.
- Most games won in a row (Cercle Brugge): 5, 24 November 1901 to 18 October 1903.
- Most home games won in a row (Club Brugge): 8, 7 September 1983 to 27 January 1991
- Most home games won in a row (Cercle Brugge): 3, 19 November 1922 to 25 January 1925
- Most away games won in a row (Club Brugge): 7, 17 October to 27 November 2005
- Most away games won in a row (Cercle Brugge): 4, 22 November 1925 to 22 December 1930
- Most games without defeat (Club Brugge): 17, 22 October 1972 to 14 February 1981. (including 15 victories)
- Most games without defeat (Cercle Brugge): 8, 4 November 1900 to 24 January 1904. (including 5 victories)
- Most home games without defeat (Club Brugge): 16, 9 October 1904 to 12 October 1924. (including 11 victories)
- Most home games without defeat (Cercle Brugge): 10, 1926–27 season to 13 February 1949. (including 3 victories)
- Most away games without defeat (Club Brugge): 15, 22 October 1972 to 31 January 1988. (including 13 victories)
- Most away games without defeat (Cercle Brugge): 5, 12 October 1924 to 22 December 1930. (including 4 victories)

=== Results ===
- Biggest win (Club Brugge): 10–0, 17 January 1991
- Biggest win (Cercle Brugge): 4–0, 9 January 1910.
- Highest scoring game: 10–0, 17 January 1991 and 5–5, 24 May 1992.
- Number of seasons in which won home and away fixture (Club Brugge): 29
- Number of seasons in which won home and away fixture (Cercle Brugge): 5
- Number of clean sheets kept (Club Brugge): 59
- Number of clean sheets kept (Cercle Brugge): 19

=== Goalscorers ===
	Player	Club(s)	League	Cup	Supercup	Total
(Belgium)	Jan Ceulemans	Club Brugge	12			12
(Belgium)	Marc Degryse	Club Brugge	11			11
(Belgium)	Raoul Lambert	Club Brugge	10			10
(Belgium)	René Vandereycken	Club Brugge	7			7
(Belgium)	Josip Weber	Cercle Brugge	7			7
(Belgium)	Willy Wellens	Club Brugge	6	1		7
(Belgium)	Lorenzo Staelens	Club Brugge	6			6
(Denmark)	Jan Sorensen	Club Brugge	5	1		6
(Belgium)	Gert Verheyen	Club Brugge	5		1	6
(Belgium)	Eric Buyse	Cercle Brugge	5			5
(Belgium)	Johny Thio	Club Brugge	5			5
(Australia)	Frank Farina	Club Brugge	5			5
(Belgium)	Wesley Sonck	Club Brugge	5			5

== Honours ==
As of 21 May 2026

Club	League championship		Cup titles		Super Cup titles		Total
Club	Total	Seasons	Total	Seasons	Total	Seasons	Total
Cercle Brugge	3	1910–11, 1926–27, 1929–30	2	1926–27, 1984–85	0		5
Club Brugge	20	1919–20, 1972–73, 1975–76, 1976–77, 1977–78, 1979–80, 1987–88, 1989–90, 1991–92, 1995–96, 1997–98, 2002–03, 2004–05, 2015–16, 2017–18, 2019–20, 2020–21, 2021–22, 2023–24, 2025–26	12	1967–68, 1969–70, 1976–77, 1985–86, 1990–91, 1994–95, 1995–96, 2001–02, 2003–04, 2006–07, 2014–15, 2024–25	18	1980, 1986, 1988, 1990, 1991, 1992, 1994, 1996, 1998, 2002, 2003, 2004, 2005, 2016, 2018, 2021, 2022, 2025	50
