= Belgian professional football awards =

Collection of awards

The Belgian professional football awards is a collection of awards given at the end of each season since 1983. Back then, the only award was the Manager of the Year. There are now 5 main awards: Footballer, Footballer (second division), Goalkeeper, Manager and Referee. The previous fifth award, the Young Footballer of the Year Award, was not awarded between 2008–09 and 2012–13. The voters are all the players from the Belgian Pro League as well as the Belgian footballers playing abroad at the highest level. The ceremony is organized together by the paper Sport Foot Magazine and the Belgian Football Association.

== Palmares ==
=== Men ===
==== Professional Footballer of the Year ====
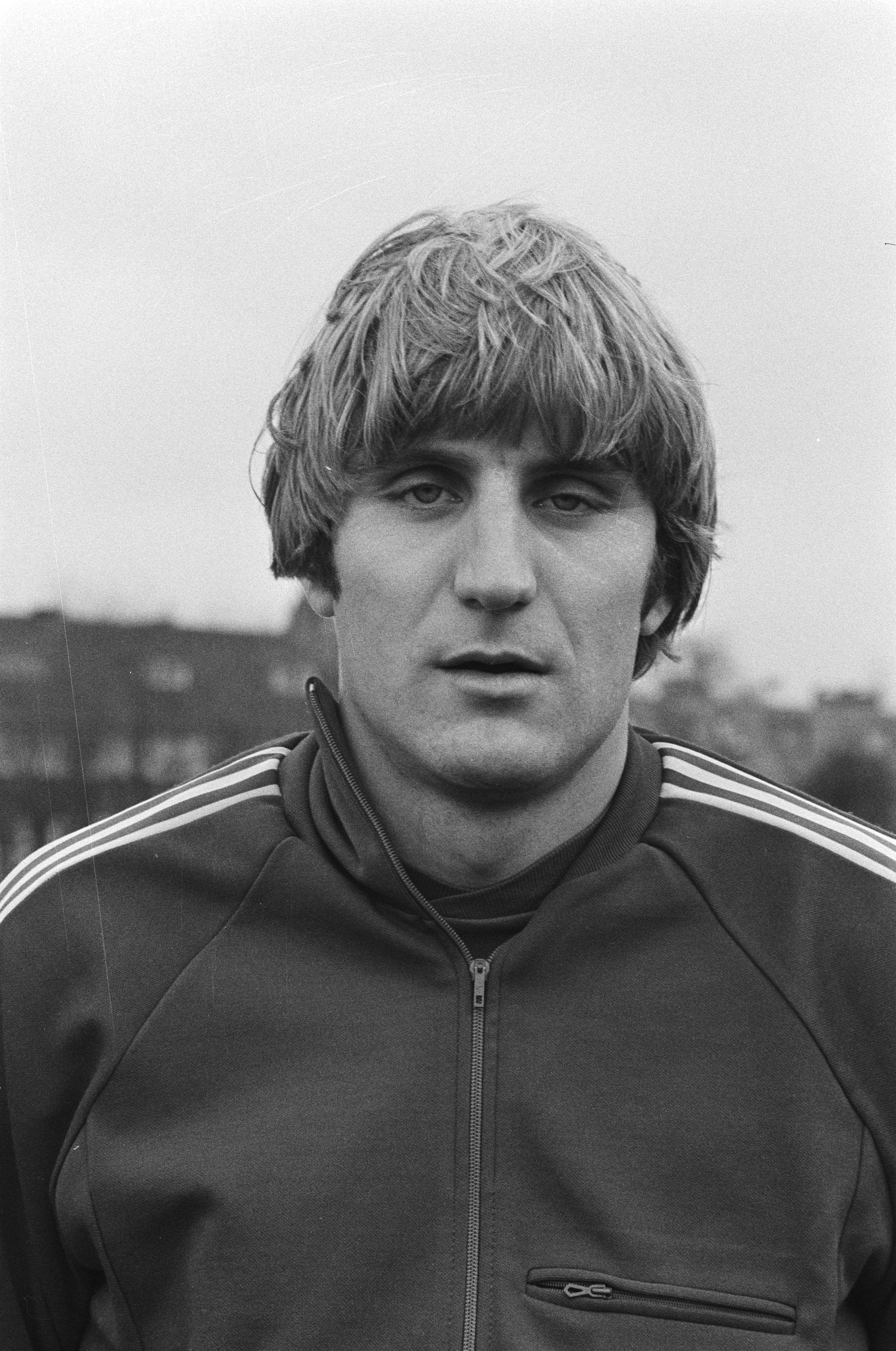
Jan Ceulemans won the award for the first three times

Season	Winner	Club	Country
1983–84	Jan Ceulemans	Club Brugge	Belgium
1984–85	Jan Ceulemans	Club Brugge	Belgium
1985–86	Jan Ceulemans	Club Brugge	Belgium
1986–87	Juan Lozano	Anderlecht	Spain
1987–88	Marc Degryse	Club Brugge	Belgium
1988–89	Marc Emmers	Mechelen	Belgium
1989–90	Marc Degryse	Anderlecht	Belgium
1990–91	Enzo Scifo	Auxerre	Belgium
1991–92	Philippe Albert	Mechelen	Belgium
1992–93	Pär Zetterberg	Charleroi	Sweden
1993–94	Lorenzo Staelens	Club Brugge	Belgium
1994–95	Marc Degryse	Anderlecht	Belgium
1995–96	Luc Nilis	PSV Eindhoven	Belgium
1996–97	Pär Zetterberg	Anderlecht	Sweden
1997–98	Pär Zetterberg	Anderlecht	Sweden
1998–99	Souleymane Oularé	Genk	Guinea
1999–2000	Marc Degryse	Germinal Beerschot	Belgium
2000–01	Walter Baseggio	Anderlecht	Belgium
2001–02	Wesley Sonck	Genk	Belgium
2002–03	Timmy Simons	Club Brugge	Belgium
2003–04	Aruna Dindane	Anderlecht	Ivory Coast
2004–05	Vincent Kompany	Anderlecht	Belgium
2005–06	Mbark Boussoufa	Gent	Morocco
2006–07	Mohammed Tchité	Anderlecht	Belgium
2007–08	Milan Jovanović	Standard Liège	Serbia
2008–09	Mbark Boussoufa	Anderlecht	Morocco
2009–10	Mbark Boussoufa	Anderlecht	Morocco
2010–11	Ivan Perišić	Club Brugge	Croatia
2011–12	Matías Suárez	Anderlecht	Argentina
2012–13	Carlos Bacca	Club Brugge	Colombia
2013–14	Thorgan Hazard	Zulte Waregem	Belgium
2014–15	Víctor Vázquez	Club Brugge	Spain
2015–16	Sofiane Hanni	Mechelen	Algeria
2016–17	Youri Tielemans	Anderlecht	Belgium
2017–18	Hans Vanaken	Club Brugge	Belgium
2018–19	Hans Vanaken	Club Brugge	Belgium
2019–20	not awarded as season was terminated early		
2020–21	Paul Onuachu	Genk	Nigeria
2021–22	Deniz Undav	Union SG	Germany
2022–23	Mike Trésor	Genk	Belgium
2023–24	Cameron Puertas	Union SG	Spain
2024–25	Ardon Jashari	Club Brugge	Switzerland
2025–26	Christos Tzolis	Club Brugge	Greece

==== Young Professional Footballer of the Year ====
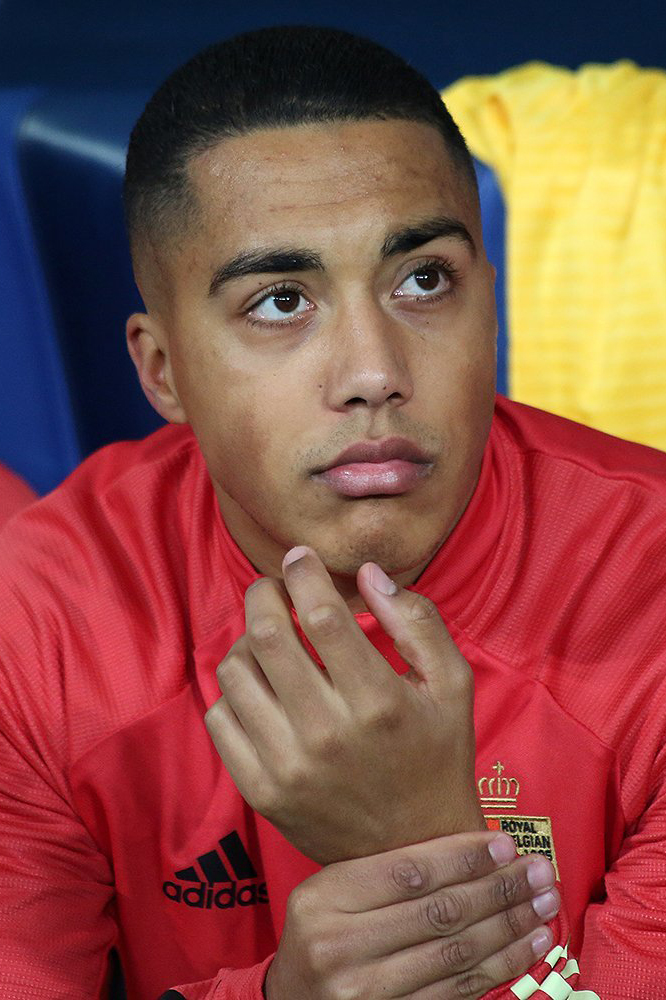
Youri Tielemans is a two-time winner of the award

Season	Winner	Club	Country
1987–88	Francis Severyns	Antwerp	Belgium
1988–89	Eric Viscaal	Beveren	Netherlands
1989–90	Marc Wilmots	Mechelen	Belgium
1990–91	Bertrand Crasson	Anderlecht	Belgium
1991–92	Johan Walem	Anderlecht	Belgium
1992–93	Michaël Goossens	Standard Liège	Belgium
1993–94	Olivier Doll	Seraing	Belgium
1994–95	Celestine Babayaro	Anderlecht	Nigeria
1995–96	Celestine Babayaro	Anderlecht	Nigeria
1996–97	Emile Mpenza	Mouscron	Belgium
1997–98	Eric Addo	Club Brugge	Ghana
1998–99	Walter Baseggio	Anderlecht	Belgium
1999–2000	Walter Baseggio	Anderlecht	Belgium
2000–01	Alin Stoica	Anderlecht	Romania
2001–02	Koen Daerden	Genk	Belgium
2002–03	Davy De Beule	Lokeren	Belgium
2003–04	Vincent Kompany	Anderlecht	Belgium
2004–05	Vincent Kompany	Anderlecht	Belgium
2005–06	Mbark Boussoufa	Gent	Morocco
2006–07	Lucas Biglia	Anderlecht	Argentina
2007–08	Axel Witsel	Standard Liège	Belgium
not awarded between 2008–09 and 2012–13
2013–14	Youri Tielemans	Anderlecht	Belgium
2014–15	Youri Tielemans	Anderlecht	Belgium
2015–16	Leon Bailey	Genk	Jamaica
2016–17	Landry Dimata	Oostende	Belgium
2017–18	Wesley	Club Brugge	Brazil
2018–19	Yari Verschaeren	Anderlecht	Belgium
2019–20	not awarded as season was terminated early		
2020–21	Noa Lang	Club Brugge	Netherlands
2021–22	Charles De Ketelaere	Club Brugge	Belgium
2022–23	Arthur Vermeeren	Antwerp	Belgium
2023–24	Bilal El Khannouss	Genk	Morocco
2024–25	Ardon Jashari	Club Brugge	Switzerland
2025–26	Aleksandar Stanković	Club Brugge	Serbia

==== Professional Goalkeeper of the Year ====
Season	Winner	Club	Country
1984–85	Gilbert Bodart	Standard Liège	Belgium
1985–86	Gilbert Bodart	Standard Liège	Belgium
1986–87	Philippe Vande Walle	Club Brugge	Belgium
1987–88	Michel Preud'homme	Mechelen	Belgium
1988–89	Michel Preud'homme	Mechelen	Belgium
1989–90	Michel Preud'homme	Mechelen	Belgium
1990–91	Michel Preud'homme	Mechelen	Belgium
1991–92	Gilbert Bodart	Standard Liège	Belgium
1992–93	Dany Verlinden	Club Brugge	Belgium
1993–94	Filip De Wilde	Anderlecht	Belgium
1994–95	Gilbert Bodart	Standard Liège	Belgium
1995–96	Philippe Vande Walle	Germinal Ekeren	Belgium
1996–97	Stanley Menzo	Lierse	Netherlands
1997–98	Ronny Gaspercic	Harelbeke	Belgium
1998–99	Vedran Runje	Standard Liège	Croatia
1999–2000	Filip De Wilde	Anderlecht	Belgium
2000–01	Vedran Runje	Standard Liège	Croatia
2001–02	Franky Vandendriessche	Mouscron	Belgium
2002–03	Dany Verlinden	Club Brugge	Belgium
2003–04	Frédéric Herpoel	Gent	Belgium
2004–05	Silvio Proto	Louviéroise	Belgium
2005–06	Vedran Runje	Standard Liège	Croatia
2006–07	Daniel Zitka	Anderlecht	Czech Republic
2007–08	Kenny Steppe	Germinal Beerschot	Belgium
2008–09	Barry Boubacar Copa	Lokeren	Ivory Coast
2009–10	Simon Mignolet	Sint-Truiden	Belgium
2010–11	Thibaut Courtois	Genk	Belgium
2011–12	Silvio Proto	Anderlecht	Belgium
2012–13	Silvio Proto	Anderlecht	Belgium
2013–14	Mathew Ryan	Club Brugge	Australia
2014–15	Mathew Ryan	Club Brugge	Australia
2015–16	Matz Sels	Gent	Belgium
2016–17	Lovre Kalinić	Gent	Croatia
2017–18	Lovre Kalinić	Gent	Croatia
2018–19	Danny Vukovic	Genk	Australia
2019–20	not awarded as season was terminated early		
2020–21	Simon Mignolet	Club Brugge	Belgium
2021–22	Simon Mignolet	Club Brugge	Belgium

==== Professional Manager of the Year ====
Season	Winner	Club	Country
1982–83	Paul Van Himst	Anderlecht	Belgium
1983–84	Georges Heylens	Seraing	Belgium
1984–85	Robert Waseige	Liégeois	Belgium
1985–86	Urbain Haesaert	Waregem	Belgium
1986–87	Aad de Mos	Mechelen	Netherlands
1987–88	Georg Kessler	Antwerp	Germany
1988–89	Aad de Mos	Mechelen	Netherlands
1989–90	Georges Leekens	Club Brugge	Belgium
1990–91	René Vandereycken	Gent	Belgium
1991–92	Hugo Broos	Club Brugge	Belgium
1992–93	Walter Meeuws	Antwerp	Belgium
1993–94	Robert Waseige	Charleroi	Belgium
1994–95	Robert Waseige	Standard Liège	Belgium
1995–96	Hugo Broos	Club Brugge	Belgium
1996–97	Eric Gerets	Lierse	Belgium
1997–98	Eric Gerets	Club Brugge	Belgium
1998–99	Aimé Anthuenis	Genk	Belgium
1999–2000	Aimé Anthuenis	Anderlecht	Belgium
2000–01	Aimé Anthuenis	Anderlecht	Belgium
2001–02	Sef Vergoossen	Genk	Netherlands
2002–03	Trond Sollied	Club Brugge	Norway
2003–04	Hugo Broos	Anderlecht	Belgium
2004–05	Trond Sollied	Club Brugge	Norway
2005–06	Francky Dury	Zulte-Waregem	Belgium
2006–07	Hugo Broos	Genk	Belgium
2007–08	Michel Preud'homme	Standard Liège	Belgium
2008–09	László Bölöni	Standard Liège	Romania
2009–10	Ariël Jacobs	Anderlecht	Belgium
2010–11	Franky Vercauteren	Genk	Belgium
2011–12	Hein Vanhaezebrouck	Kortrijk	Belgium
2012–13	Francky Dury	Zulte-Waregem	Belgium
2013–14	Peter Maes	Lokeren	Belgium
2014–15	Michel Preud'homme	Club Brugge	Belgium
2015–16	Michel Preud'homme	Club Brugge	Belgium
2016–17	René Weiler	Anderlecht	Switzerland
2017–18	Ivan Leko	Club Brugge	Croatia
2018–19	Philippe Clement	Genk	Belgium
2019–20	not awarded as season was terminated early		
2020–21	Alexander Blessin	Oostende	Germany
2021–22	Felice Mazzu	Union SG	Belgium
2022–23	Mark van Bommel	Antwerp	Netherlands
2023–24	Alexander Blessin	Union SG	Germany
2024–25	Sébastien Pocognoli	Union SG	Belgium
2025–26	Wouter Vrancken	Sint-Truiden	Belgium

==== Professional Referee of the Year ====
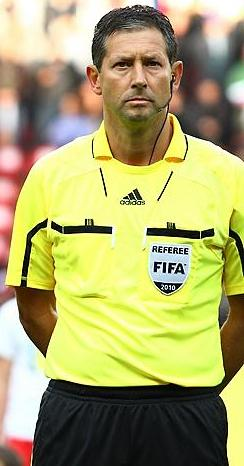
Frank De Bleeckere is a seven-time winner of the award

Season	Winner
1983–84	Marcel Van Langenhove
1984–85	Marcel Van Langenhove
1985–86	Marcel Van Langenhove
1986–87	Marcel Van Langenhove
1987–88	Marcel Van Langenhove
1988–89	Marcel Van Langenhove
1989–90	Marcel Van Langenhove
1990–91	Marcel Van Langenhove
1991–92	Alphonse Constantin
1992–93	Alphonse Constantin
1993–94	Guy Goethals
1994–95	Guy Goethals
1995–96	Guy Goethals
1996–97	Frans Van Den Wijngaert
1997–98	Frans Van Den Wijngaert
1998–99	Frans Van Den Wijngaert
1999–2000	Frank De Bleeckere
2000–01	Frank De Bleeckere
2001–02	Frank De Bleeckere
2002–03	Frank De Bleeckere
2003–04	Johan Verbist
2004–05	Paul Allaerts
2005–06	Paul Allaerts
2006–07	Jérôme Efong Nzolo
2007–08	Jérôme Efong Nzolo
2008–09	Jérôme Efong Nzolo
2009–10	Frank De Bleeckere
2010–11	Frank De Bleeckere
2011–12	Frank De Bleeckere
2012–13	Jérôme Efong Nzolo
2013–14	Johan Verbist
2014–15	Sébastien Delferière
2015–16	Sébastien Delferière
2016–17	Sébastien Delferière
2017–18	Jonathan Lardot
2018–19	Erik Lambrechts
2019–20	not awarded as season was terminated early
2020–21	Jonathan Lardot
2021–22	Erik Lambrechts
2022–23	Jonathan Lardot
2023–24	Jonathan Lardot
2024–25	Bram Van Driessche
2025–26	Bram Van Driessche

==== Professional Footballer of the Year (Second Division) ====
Season	Winner	Club	Country
2017–18	Xavier Mercier	Cercle Brugge	France
2018–19	Percy Tau	Union SG	South Africa
2019–20	not awarded as season was terminated early		
2020–21	Dante Vanzeir	Union SG	Belgium
2021–22	Lukas Van Eenoo	Westerlo	Belgium
2022–23	Thierno Barry	Beveren	France
2023–24	Thibaud Verlinden	Beerschot	Belgium
2024–25	Jelle Vossen	Zulte Waregem	Belgium
2025–26	Christian Brüls	Beveren	Belgium

=== Women ===
==== Professional Footballer of the Year ====
Season	Winner	Club	Country
2020–21	Laura De Neve	Anderlecht	Belgium
2021–22	Tessa Wullaert	Anderlecht	Belgium
2022–23	Lore Jacobs	Anderlecht	Belgium
2023–24	Marie Detruyer	Oud-Heverlee Leuven	Belgium
2024–25	Mariam Toloba	Standard Liège	Belgium
2025–26	Aurélie Reynders	Oud-Heverlee Leuven	Belgium
