= Pär Zetterberg =

Swedish footballer (born 1970)

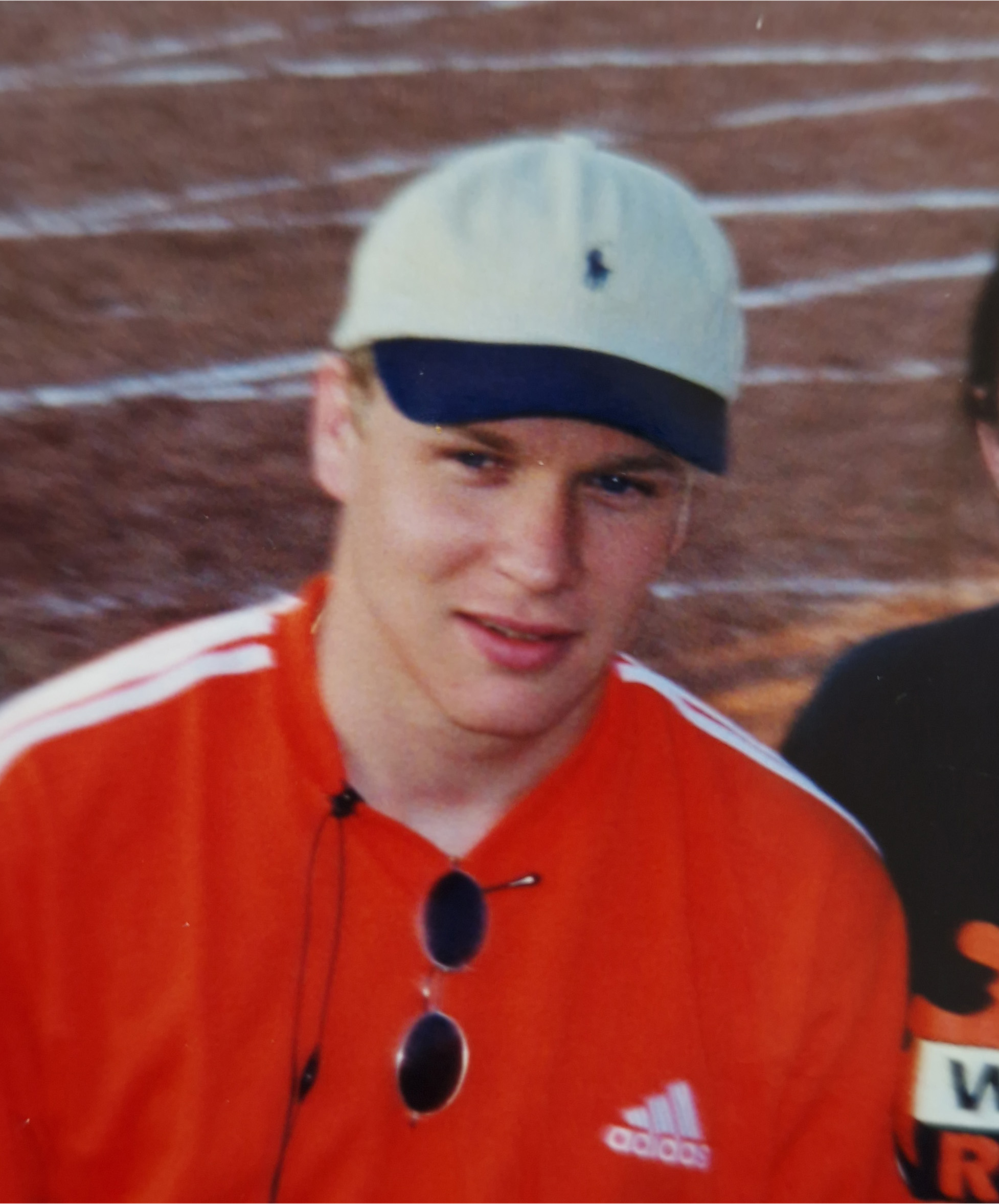
- Zetterberg with Anderlecht in 1997

Personal information
- Full name: Pär Johan Zetterberg
- Date of birth: 14 October 1970 (age 56)
- Place of birth: Falkenberg, Sweden
- Height: 1.74 m (5 ft 9 in)
- Position: Midfielder

Youth career
- 1978–1986: Falkenbergs FF
- 1986–1991: Anderlecht

Senior career*
| Years | Team | Apps | (Gls) |
| 1986 | Falkenbergs FF | 7 | (0) |
| 1989–2000 | Anderlecht | 195 | (49) |
| 1991–1993 | → Charleroi (loan) | 62 | (11) |
| 2000–2003 | Olympiacos | 61 | (7) |
| 2003–2006 | Anderlecht | 89 | (23) |
| Total | | 414 | (90) |

International career
| 1986–1987 | Sweden U17 | 11 | (2) |
| 1990 | Sweden U21 | 1 | (0) |
| 1993–1999 | Sweden | 30 | (6) |

Managerial career
- 2018–2020: Anderlecht (assistant)
- * Club domestic league appearances and goals

Pär Johan Zetterberg (pronounced [ˈpæː ˈʂɛ̂tːɛrˌbærj]; born 14 October 1970) is a Swedish former professional footballer who played as a midfielder. He is best remembered for his time with R.S.C. Anderlecht, but also represented Falkenbergs FF, Charleroi, and Olympiacos during a career that spanned between 1986 and 2006. A full international between 1993 and 1999, he won 30 caps for the Sweden national team and scored six goals. He was awarded Guldbollen in 1997 as Sweden's best footballer of the year.

== Club career ==
Zetterberg started off his footballing career with Falkenbergs FF in 1978, and made his senior debut for the team in Division 3 at the age of 15 in 1986. After having played seven games for Falkenberg, he joined Anderlecht as a youth player later in the same year. He made his debut for Anderlecht in the Belgian First Division in 1989 and had a loan spell at Charleroi between 1991 and 1993. He stayed with Anderlecht until the year 2000 and helped the team to four league titles during this time.

In 2000, Zetterberg joined Olympiacos in the Alpha Ethniki and helped the team to three straight league titles between 2000 and 2003. He returned to Anderlecht in 2003 and helped the team to another two league titles before retiring from professional football in 2006.

He appeared in around 300 games for Anderlecht during his two spells with the team.

== International career ==
Zetterberg represented the Sweden U17 and U21 teams a total of 12 times, scoring two goals.

He made his full international debut for Sweden on 19 May 1993 in a 1994 FIFA World Cup qualifier against Austria, replacing Johnny Ekström in the 70th minute of a 1–0 win. He scored his first senior goal for Sweden two weeks later on 2 June 1993 in a 1994 FIFA World Cup qualifier against Israel, scoring the third goal in 5–0 win. Zetterberg helped Sweden qualify for the 1994 FIFA World Cup, but missed out on the tournament because of a serious knee injury.

He played in the qualification campaigns for UEFA Euro 1996 and the 1998 FIFA World Cup, but could not help Sweden qualify for the two tournaments despite scoring a total of three goals during the latter campaign.

Zetterberg had a falling out with the national team manager Tommy Söderberg in 1999, and declared that he would not return to the Sweden national team until Söderberg no longer managed the team. He would play his last ever international game for Sweden in a 1–0 UEFA Euro 2000 qualifying win against Luxembourg at the age of 28. Zetterberg won a total of 30 caps during his career, scoring six goals.

== Coaching career ==
On 21 March 2020, Zetterberg left RSC Anderlecht as assistant manager after a two year stint.

== Personal life ==
Zetterberg has type 1 diabetes. He is the father of professional footballer Erik Zetterberg.

== Career statistics ==
=== Club ===
Appearances and goals by club, season and competition
| Club | Season | League | | | National Cup | | League Cup | | Continental | | Total | |
| Club | Season | Division | Apps | Goals | Apps | Goals | Apps | Goals | Apps | Goals | Apps | Goals |
|---|---|---|---|---|---|---|---|---|---|---|---|---|
| Falkenberg | 1986 | Division 3 | 7 | 0 | — | | — | | — | | 7 | 0 |
| Anderlecht | 1989–90 | First Division | 0 | 0 | 1 | 0 | 0 | 0 | 1 | 0 | 2 | 0 |
| Anderlecht | 1990–91 | First Division | 2 | 0 | 0 | 0 | 0 | 0 | 1 | 0 | 3 | 0 |
| Anderlecht | 1993–94 | First Division | 22 | 3 | 3 | 1 | 1 | 0 | 6 | 0 | 32 | 4 |
| Anderlecht | 1994–95 | First Division | 24 | 3 | 3 | 0 | 1 | 0 | 4 | 0 | 32 | 3 |
| Anderlecht | 1995–96 | First Division | 33 | 5 | 3 | 0 | 1 | 0 | 2 | 0 | 39 | 5 |
| Anderlecht | 1996–97 | First Division | 32 | 12 | 6 | 2 | 0 | 0 | 8 | 3 | 46 | 17 |
| Anderlecht | 1997–98 | First Division | 25 | 7 | 1 | 0 | 0 | 0 | 6 | 0 | 32 | 7 |
| Anderlecht | 1998–99 | First Division | 24 | 7 | 1 | 1 | 0 | 0 | 6 | 0 | 31 | 8 |
| Anderlecht | 1999–2000 | First Division | 34 | 14 | 1 | 1 | 0 | 0 | 6 | 3 | 41 | 18 |
| Anderlecht | Total | | 196 | 51 | 19 | 4 | 3 | 0 | 40 | 6 | 248 | 61 |
| Charleroi (loan) | 1991–92 | First Division | 29 | 5 | 0 | 0 | 0 | 0 | — | | 29 | 5 |
| Charleroi (loan) | 1992–93 | First Division | 33 | 6 | 5 | 1 | 0 | 0 | — | | 38 | 7 |
| Charleroi (loan) | Total | | 62 | 11 | 5 | 1 | 0 | 0 | 0 | 0 | 67 | 12 |
| Olympiacos | 2000–01 | Alpha Ethniki | 22 | 4 | 12 | 0 | — | | 8 | 0 | 42 | 4 |
| Olympiacos | 2001–02 | Alpha Ethniki | 15 | 0 | 12 | 2 | — | | 3 | 0 | 30 | 2 |
| Olympiacos | 2002–03 | Alpha Ethniki | 24 | 3 | 6 | 2 | — | | 6 | 1 | 36 | 6 |
| Olympiacos | Total | | 61 | 7 | 30 | 4 | — | | 17 | 1 | 108 | 12 |
| Anderlecht | 2003–04 | First Division | 30 | 7 | 5 | 1 | 0 | 0 | 7 | 1 | 42 | 9 |
| Anderlecht | 2004–05 | First Division | 29 | 8 | 2 | 0 | 1 | 0 | 5 | 0 | 37 | 8 |
| Anderlecht | 2005–06 | First Division | 30 | 8 | 0 | 0 | 0 | 0 | 8 | 0 | 38 | 8 |
| Anderlecht | Total | | 89 | 23 | 7 | 1 | 1 | 0 | 20 | 1 | 117 | 25 |
| Career total | | | 415 | 92 | 61 | 10 | 4 | 0 | 77 | 8 | 557 | 110 |

=== International ===
Appearances and goals by national team and year
| National team | Year | Apps | Goals |
|---|---|---|---|
| Sweden | 1993 | 6 | 1 |
| Sweden | 1994 | 0 | 0 |
| Sweden | 1995 | 3 | 0 |
| Sweden | 1996 | 8 | 0 |
| Sweden | 1997 | 9 | 5 |
| Sweden | 1998 | 3 | 0 |
| Sweden | 1999 | 1 | 0 |
| Total | | 30 | 6 |

Scores and results list Sweden's goal tally first, score column indicates score after each Zetterberg goal.

List of international goals scored by Pär Zetterberg
| No. | Date | Venue | Opponent | Score | Result | Competition | Ref. |
|---|---|---|---|---|---|---|---|
| 1 | 2 June 1993 | Råsunda Stadium, Solna, Sweden | Israel | 3–0 | 5–0 | 1994 FIFA World Cup qualification | |
| 2 | 22 May 1997 | Råsunda Stadium, Solna, Sweden | Poland | 1–0 | 2–2 | Friendly | |
| 3 | 22 May 1997 | Råsunda Stadium, Solna, Sweden | Poland | 2–0 | 2–2 | Friendly | |
| 4 | 8 June 1997 | Kadriorg Stadium, Tallinn, Estonia | Estonia | 2–0 | 3–2 | 1998 FIFA World Cup qualification | |
| 5 | 20 August 1997 | Dinamo Stadium, Minsk, Belarus | Belarus | 2–1 | 1–1 | 1998 FIFA World Cup qualification | |
| 6 | 11 October 1997 | Råsunda Stadium, Solna, Sweden | Estonia | 1–0 | 1–0 | 1998 FIFA World Cup qualification | |

== Honours ==
Anderlecht

- Belgian First Division: 1990–91, 1993–94, 1994–95, 1999–00, 2003–04, 2005–06
- Belgian Cup: 1993–94
- Belgian League Cup: 2000
- Belgian Sports Team of the Year: 2000

Olympiacos

- Super League Greece: 2000–01, 2001–02, 2002–03

Individual

- Belgian Golden Shoe: 1993, 1997
- Belgian Professional Footballer of the Year: 1993, 1997, 1998
- Man of the Season (Belgian First Division): 1996–97
- Swedish Golden Ball: 1997
- Belgian Fair Play Award: 1998, 1999, 2000, 2004, 2005, 2006
- Platina Eleven (Best Team in 50 Years of Golden Shoe Winners) (2003)
- Honorary Citizen of Anderlecht: 2006
- The Best Golden Shoe Team Ever (2011)
- Pro League Hall of Fame: 2024
