= Peter Maes =

Belgian football manager (born 1964)

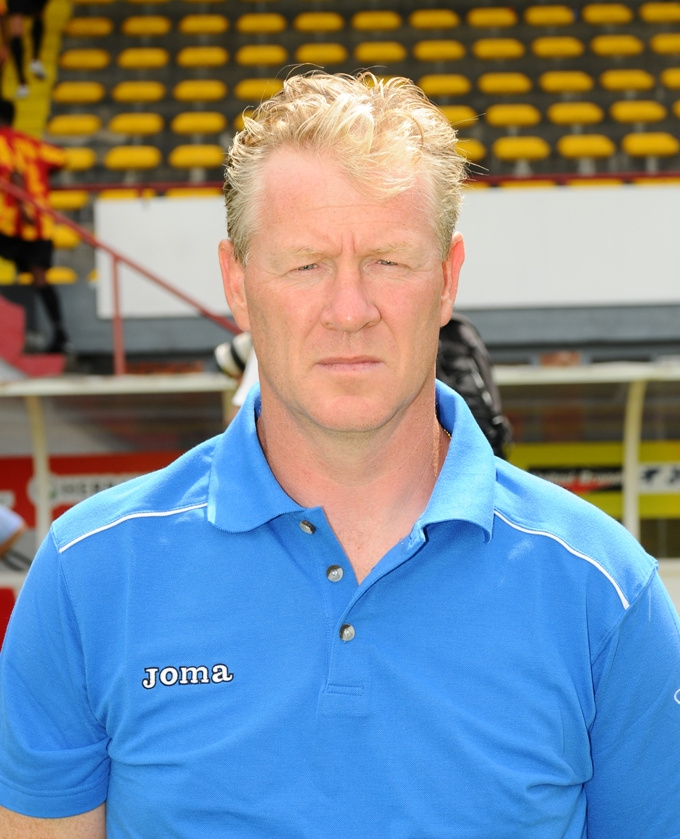
- Maes in 2010

Personal information
- Date of birth: 1 June 1964 (age 62)
- Place of birth: Schoten, Belgium
- Height: 1.88 m (6 ft 2 in)
- Position: Goalkeeper

Youth career
- 1974–1981: Lutlommel VV
- 1981–1982: Lommel

Senior career*
Years	Team	Apps	(Gls)
1982–1989	Lommel	134	(0)
1989–1990	Racing Mechelen	0	(0)
1990–1995	Anderlecht	18	(0)
1995–1996	Beveren	34	(0)
1996–1998	Standard Liège	43	(0)
1999–2001	Germinal Beerschot	8	(0)
Total		237	(0)

Managerial career
- 2001–2002: Verbroedering Geel-Meerhout
- 2002–2006: Verbroedering Geel
- 2006–2010: Mechelen
- 2010–2015: Lokeren
- 2015–2016: Genk
- 2017–2018: Lokeren
- 2019–2020: Lommel
- 2020–2021: Sint-Truiden
- 2021: Beerschot VA
- 2023–2025: Willem II
- * Club domestic league appearances and goals

Peter Maes (Dutch pronunciation: [ˈpeːtər ˈmaːs]; born 1 June 1964) is a Belgian professional football manager and former player.

Prior to Willem II, he also managed Beerschot VA in the Belgian First Division A, KV Mechelen and Genk.

== Playing career ==
Maes began his professional career as a goalkeeper in the 1980s with third-division club Lommel. Initially a backup, he eventually established himself as the team's first-choice goalkeeper, playing alongside teammates like Harm van Veldhoven, Patrick Goots, and Philip Haagdoren. In 1987, he helped Lommel secure promotion to the second division.

In 1989, Maes joined first-division side Racing Mechelen, serving as the backup to Ivan De Wilde. Following Racing Mechelen's relegation at the end of the season, he signed with Anderlecht. At Anderlecht, Maes was the understudy to Filip De Wilde, seeing limited playing time but contributing to the team's success as they claimed the league title in 1991. During the 1991–92 season, he gained more opportunities after De Wilde suffered an injury. Despite competition from emerging talents like Frédéric Herpoel, Maes remained Anderlecht’s second-choice goalkeeper until 1995, winning four league titles during his time with the club.

In the summer of 1995, Maes moved to Beveren as part of a swap deal involving Geert De Vlieger. At Beveren, he was the first-choice goalkeeper for one season before transferring to Standard Liège to replace departing captain Gilbert Bodart, with Jean-François Gillet as his understudy. However, Bodart returned to Standard for the 1997–98 season, relegating Maes to a backup role.

In 1999, at the age of 35, Maes joined the newly established fusion club Germinal Beerschot. Under coach Franky Van der Elst, he served as backup to Jan Moons and retired from professional football in 2001.

== Managerial career ==
=== Early coaching career ===
Immediately after retiring as a player, Maes transitioned into coaching. His first role was with Verbroedering Geel-Meerhout, where he guided the team to the promotion playoffs in 2002. He then moved to Verbroedering Geel, a second-division club, remaining there for four seasons. His tenure ended in 2006 after the club was relegated to the third division following a match-fixing scandal.

=== Mechelen ===
In the summer of 2006, Maes took over as head coach of KV Mechelen, then competing in the second division. He led the team to a runner-up finish and promotion to the top flight via the play-offs. Under his leadership, and with key players such as Jonas Ivens, Koen Persoons, Björn Vleminckx, and Nana Asare, KV Mechelen established itself as a stable mid-table side in the Belgian Pro League.

=== Lokeren ===
In 2010, Lokeren chairman Roger Lambrecht recruited Maes along with midfielder Koen Persoons. In his first season, Maes led Lokeren to the championship round. He secured his first major trophy in 2012 when Lokeren defeated Kortrijk 1–0 in the Belgian Cup final, earning qualification for the UEFA Europa League. Two years later, Lokeren claimed another Belgian Cup, this time with a 1–0 victory over Zulte Waregem. In the 2014–15 Europa League campaign, Maes guided Lokeren to the group stage after eliminating Hull City in the play-offs round.

=== Genk ===
On 26 May 2015, Maes signed a three-year contract with Genk. In his debut season, Genk finished fourth in the league. During the 2016–17 season, he led the team to the Europa League round of 16. However, inconsistent domestic performances led to his dismissal on 26 December 2016, with Albert Stuivenberg named as his replacement.

=== Return to Lokeren ===
On 9 August 2017, Maes returned to Lokeren, succeeding Rúnar Kristinsson. His second tenure at the club ended in controversy. On 22 October 2018, Belgian media reported that Maes had been arrested in connection with the "Operation Clean Hands" investigation into football fraud, involving his agent Dejan Veljković. After appearing before an investigative judge, Lokeren dismissed Maes on 28 October, citing poor results. Arnar Viðarsson was appointed as his successor.

=== Lommel, Sint-Truiden and Beerschot ===
In the 2019–20 season, Maes became head coach of Lommel in the Belgian First Division B, tasked with keeping the club in the professional divisions after the dismissal of Stefán Gíslason. He successfully avoided relegation but left the club after it was acquired by the City Football Group, as his contract was not renewed.

In December 2020, Sint-Truiden appointed Maes as their new head coach.

On 20 May 2021, Beerschot revealed Maes as their new head coach, with a contract extending until 2024. However, his tenure ended abruptly with his dismissal in September 2021.

=== Willem II ===
On 16 September 2023, Eerste Divisie side Willem II introduced Maes as their new head coach, succeeding the departed Reinier Robbemond. Maes marked the club's first-ever Belgian head coach and his first coaching venture abroad. At the time of his appointment, Willem II sat 15th in the league table. Under Maes' guidance, the team secured victories in their initial four matches, notably boosted by the contributions of Jeremy Bokila, who netted eight of the team's fourteen goals during this period. Maes also set a precedent by becoming the first Willem II coach to achieve wins in his first three matches. In his first season with Willem II, Maes guided the team to the Eerste Divisie title, securing promotion to the Eredivisie. On 21 May 2024, he extended his contract until 2026.

Peter Maes departed his role as head coach of Willem II on 30 April 2025, following a challenging period in the Eredivisie where the team suffered eight consecutive defeats. The club and Maes mutually agreed to part ways, with assistant coach Kristof Aelbrecht stepping in as interim head coach.

== Investigation ==
In October 2018, Maes, coach of the Belgium national football team Lokeren, was arrested for corruption in Belgian football. After Ivan Leko, Maes is the second coach to be imprisoned in this case.

In July 2023, Maes reached a settlement with the federal prosecutor's office, agreeing to pay a fine to the tax authorities and to the public prosecutor's office as well as repaying any money shown to have been unlawfully earned. This concluded his portion of the investigation and cleared the way for his return to managing football.

== Honours ==
Lokeren

- Belgian Cup: 2011–12, 2013–14

Willem II

- Eerste Divisie: 2023–24

Individual

- Raymond Goethals Trophy: 2012
