= 1996 Belgian Cup final =

- Event: 1995–96 Belgian Cup
Club Brugge	Cercle Brugge
2	1
- Date: 26 May 1996
- Venue: King Baudouin Stadium, Brussels
- Referee: Robert Jeurissen
- Attendance: 30,000

The 1996 Belgian Cup final, took place on 26 May 1996 and was a Bruges derby between Club Brugge and Cercle Brugge. It was the 41st Belgian Cup final. Cercle Brugge took the lead through an early goal by Gábor Torma, but two goals by Mario Stanić still in the first half tilted the tie in favour of Club Brugge.

== Route to the final ==
Club Brugge				Cercle Brugge
Opponent	Result	Legs	Round	Opponent	Result	Legs
K.F.C. Poederlee (III)	1–0	1–0 home	Sixth round	Lommel (I)	2–1	2–1 home
Beveren (I)	4–1	4–1 away	Seventh round	Lokeren (II)	4–1	4–1 home
RFC Liège (III)	2–1 (a.e.t.)	2–1 (a.e.t.) home	Quarter-finals	Beerschot (II)	2–1 (a.e.t.)	2–1 (a.e.t.) home
Sint-Truiden (I)	6–2	3–1 home, 3–1 away	Semi-finals	Antwerp (I)	6–3	3–0 away; 3–3 home

== Match ==
=== Details ===
26 May 1996
16:00

Club Brugge	2–1	Cercle Brugge
Stanić 27', 41'	Report	Torma 5'

King Baudouin Stadium, Brussels
Attendance: 30,000
Referee: Robert Jeurissen

Club Brugge	Cercle Brugge

GK	1	(Belgium) Dany Verlinden
RB	2	(Belgium) Gunter Verjans
CB	4	(Belgium) Dirk Medved
CB	3	(Belgium) Pascal Renier
LB	5	(Belgium) Vital Borkelmans
RM	7	(Belgium) Sven Vermant	(substituted off) 80'
CM	6	(Belgium) Franky Van der Elst (c)
CM	8	(Belgium) Lorenzo Staelens
LM	11	(Belgium) Gert Claessens	(substituted off) 75'
CF	10	(Belgium) Gert Verheyen	(substituted off) 89'
CF	9	(Croatia) Mario Stanić
Substitutes:
DF		(Belgium) Pascal Plovie	(substituted on) 89'
DF		(Zaire) Hervé Nzelo Lembi	(substituted on) 75'
DF		(Belgium) Tjörven De Brul	(substituted on) 80'
Manager:
(Belgium) Hugo Broos

GK	1	(Belgium) Wim Henneman
SW	5	(Netherlands) Wim Kooiman	Booked
RB	2	(Belgium) Bert Lamaire		(substituted off) 66'
CB	6	(Belgium) Thierry Siquet
CB	4	(Belgium) Alex Camerman
LB	10	(Romania) Tibor Selymes (c)
RM	8	(Belgium) Björn Renty		(substituted off) 56'
CM	3	(Belgium) Geoffrey Claeys	Booked
LM	7	(Belgium) Kurt Soenens
CF	9	(Belgium) Davy Cooreman		(substituted off) 83'
CF	11	(Hungary) Gábor Torma
Substitutes:
MF		(Romania) Ilie Stan		(substituted on) 81'
DF		(Belgium) Bernard Beuken		(substituted on) 56'
MF		(Zambia) Joe Bwalya		(substituted on) 66'
Manager:
(Croatia) Jerko Tipurić

Match rules

- 90 minutes.
- 30 minutes of extra time if necessary.
- Penalty shoot-out if scores still level.
- Seven named substitutes.
- Maximum of three substitutions.
