= Lorenzo Staelens =

Belgian footballer and manager

Personal information
- Full name: Lorenzo Jules Staelens
- Date of birth: 30 April 1964 (age 62)
- Place of birth: Lauwe, Belgium
- Height: 1.83 m (6 ft 0 in)
- Positions: Sweeper; midfielder

Senior career*
Years	Team	Apps	(Gls)
1982–1987	KWSC Lauwe		
1987–1989	Kortrijk	64	(11)
1989–1998	Club Brugge	286	(75)
1998–2000	Anderlecht	67	(10)
2001	Ōita Trinita	26	(2)

International career
1990–2000	Belgium	70	(8)

Managerial career
- 2002–2003: Mouscron
- 2004: Eendracht Aalst
- 2006–2007: Kortrijk (director of sports)
- 2007–2008: Roeselare (assistant)
- 2008–2013: Cercle Brugge (assistant)
- 2013–2014: Cercle Brugge
- 2015: OMS Ingelmunster
- 2016–2017: Royal Mouscron (assistant)
- 2017–2018: KV Kortrijk (assistant)
- 2018–2019: Knokke
- 2019: Lokeren (assistant)
- 2022: HSV Hoek
- * Club domestic league appearances and goals

Lorenzo Jules Staelens (Dutch pronunciation: [loːˈrɛnzoː ˈstaːləns]; born 30 April 1964) is a Belgian professional football manager and former player. He most recently coached Dutch club HSV Hoek.

Having started his career as a defensive midfielder, he finished it as a sweeper at nearly 40, and scored more than 100 goals overall.

Staelens appeared for the Belgium national team in three World Cups, adding the Euro 2000 tournament played on home soil.

== Club career ==
Born in Lauwe, Staelens started his professional career with K.V. Kortrijk at already 23, and his two solid seasons there attracted the attention of top division giants Club Brugge KV.

There, he proceeded to form a legendary midfield partnership with Franky Van der Elst, that would last nearly a decade. Staelens played 369 games in all competitions for the club, scoring 105 goals.

At already 34, and more often than not playing in the backline, he moved to R.S.C. Anderlecht, still being instrumental in the club's back-to-back championships (2000 and 2001), and winning the Belgian Golden Shoe in 1999; however, he did not finish his last year, moving to Japan's Ōita Trinita in early 2001 and retiring shortly after.

Staelens took up coaching subsequently, first with R.E. Mouscron. After only two months at V.C. Eendracht Aalst, he returned to first club Kortrijk as its general manager, only returning to the benches in 2007, as assistant coach at K.S.V. Roeselare. Staelens kept that role in the subsequent years, with the other team from Bruges, Cercle KSV.

== International career ==
As an inexperienced international player, Staelens was selected to Belgium's squad for the 1990 FIFA World Cup; there, he appeared in the 2–1 group stage loss against Spain.

From then on, Staelens became an essential national team member, representing it also at the 1994 and 1998 World Cups and in UEFA Euro 2000, totalling a further 10 complete matches.

== Career statistics ==
=== Club ===
Appearances and goals by club, season and competition
Club	Season	League		
Club	Season	Division	Apps	Goals
Kortrijk	1987–88	Belgian Pro League	32	4
Kortrijk	1988–89	Belgian Pro League	32	7
Kortrijk	Total		64	11
Brugge	1989–90	Belgian Pro League	34	4
Brugge	1990–91	Belgian Pro League	33	4
Brugge	1991–92	Belgian Pro League	31	5
Brugge	1992–93	Belgian Pro League	34	7
Brugge	1993–94	Belgian Pro League	33	12
Brugge	1994–95	Belgian Pro League	34	16
Brugge	1995–96	Belgian Pro League	30	12
Brugge	1996–97	Belgian Pro League	31	8
Brugge	1997–98	Belgian Pro League	26	6
Brugge	Total		286	74
Anderlecht	1998–99	Belgian Pro League	24	6
Anderlecht	1999–2000	Belgian Pro League	29	1
Anderlecht	2000–01	Belgian Pro League	14	3
Anderlecht	Total		67	10
Oita Trinita	2001	J2 League	26	2
Career total			443	97

=== International ===
Appearances and goals by national team and year
National team	Year	Apps	Goals
Belgium	1990	3	0
Belgium	1991	3	0
Belgium	1992	4	1
Belgium	1993	6	0
Belgium	1994	11	0
Belgium	1995	8	0
Belgium	1996	3	0
Belgium	1997	6	5
Belgium	1998	8	0
Belgium	1999	11	1
Belgium	2000	7	1
Total		70	8

=== International goals ===
No.	Date	Venue	Opponent	Score	Result	Competition
1.	18 November 1992	Constant Vanden Stock Stadium, Brussels, Belgium	Wales	1–0	2–0	1994 FIFA World Cup qualification
2.	29 March 1997	Cardiff Arms Park, Cardiff, Wales	Wales	2–0	2–1	1998 FIFA World Cup qualification
3.	7 June 1997	King Baudouin Stadium, Brussels, Belgium	San Marino	1–0	6–0	1998 FIFA World Cup qualification
4.	7 June 1997	King Baudouin Stadium, Brussels, Belgium	San Marino	6–0	6–0	1998 FIFA World Cup qualification
5.	6 September 1997	De Kuip, Rotterdam, Netherlands	Netherlands	1–2	1–3	1998 FIFA World Cup qualification
6.	11 October 1997	King Baudouin Stadium, Brussels, Belgium	Wales	1–0	3–2	1998 FIFA World Cup qualification
7.	6 September 1999	Stade Maurice Dufrasne, Liège, Belgium	Morocco	1–0	4–0	Friendly
8.	3 June 2000	Telia Parken, Copenhagen, Denmark	Denmark	1–1	2–2	Friendly

== Honours ==
Club Brugge

- Belgian First Division: 1989–90, 1991–92, 1995–96, 1997–98
- Belgian Cup: 1990–91, 1994–95, 1995–96
- Belgian Super Cup: 1990, 1991, 1992, 1994, 1996
- Bruges Matins: 1990, 1992, 1993, 1995, 1996
- Amsterdam Tournament: 1990
- Jules Pappaert Cup: 1991, 1995

Anderlecht

- Belgian First Division: 1999–00
- Belgian League Cup: 2000
- Belgian Super Cup: 2000
- Belgian Sports Team of the Year: 2000

Individual

- Belgian Professional Footballer of the Year: 1993–94
- Belgian Golden Shoe: 1999
