= Filip De Wilde =

Belgian footballer

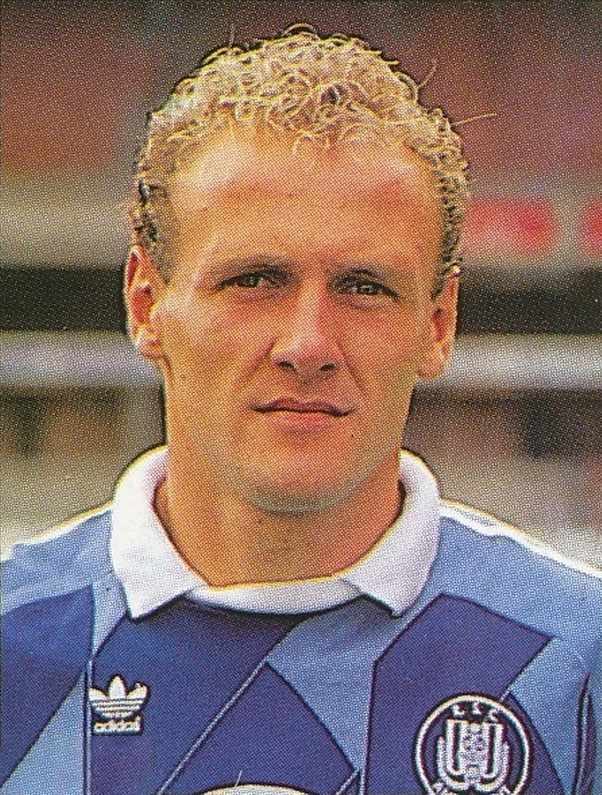
- De Wilde with Anderlecht in 1991

Personal information
- Full name: Filip Alfons De Wilde
- Date of birth: 5 July 1964 (age 62)
- Place of birth: Zele, Belgium
- Height: 1.80 m (5 ft 11 in)
- Position: Goalkeeper

Youth career
- 1973–1980: Eendracht Zele
- 1980–1982: Beveren

Senior career*
Years	Team	Apps	(Gls)
1982–1987	Beveren	176	(0)
1987–1996	Anderlecht	245	(0)
1996–1998	Sporting CP	50	(0)
1998–2003	Anderlecht	124	(0)
2003	Sturm Graz	17	(0)
2004	Lokeren	17	(0)
2005	FC Geel		
Total		629	(0)

International career
1989–2000	Belgium	33	(0)

Managerial career
- 2007–2012: Anderlecht (goalkeeping coach)
- 2012–: Belgium U21 (goalkeeping coach)
- * Club domestic league appearances and goals

Filip Alfons De Wilde (born 5 July 1964) is a former Belgian professional footballer who played as a goalkeeper.

During a 23-year professional career he played mainly with Anderlecht, appearing in nearly 400 official games in two different spells. He also competed in Portugal and Austria.

De Wilde represented Belgium for 11 years, playing for the country in three World Cups and Euro 2000.

== Club career ==
De Wilde was born in Zele, East Flanders. At the age of nine he entered local Eendracht Zele's youth system, joining the famous K.S.K. Beveren goalkeeper school in 1980. He then signed for R.S.C. Anderlecht after five full seasons, where he became a legend; during his first stint he won four national championships, three Belgian Cups and two Supercups.

In 1996, De Wilde left Brussels and his country and joined Sporting Clube de Portugal but, after losing first-choice status to youngster Tiago, returned home to Anderlecht in April 1998, for the rest of that campaign and five more (being first-choice until his last year).

In January 2004, after a brief spell in Austria with SK Sturm Graz, De Wilde joined, at 39, K.S.C. Lokeren Oost-Vlaanderen, for his final two seasons as a professional. He did play however during two months (April–May 2005) for lowly K.F.C. Verbroedering Geel.

== International career ==
De Wilde was on the Belgium national team in three FIFA World Cups: 1990, 1994 and 1998. He played the first of his 33 games with the Red Devils against Denmark in a 1989 friendly, coming on as a substitute for Gilbert Bodart at half-time.

In the first two World Cups, De Wilde acted as backup to legendary Michel Preud'homme but, after the latter's retirement he became first-choice, playing in the 1998 edition. His last international appearance was a sour one, as the match against Turkey at the UEFA Euro 2000 was lost by the hosts 0–2 and he was sent off with seven minutes to go (previously, he hesitated and lost the ball to opposing striker Hakan Şükür, who opened the scoresheet), as Belgium was eliminated in the first round.

== Coaching career ==
Upon retiring in June De Wilde immediately rejoined former side Anderlecht, as a goalkeeping coach.

De Wilde began working with the Belgian under-21s in 2012, still as a goalkeeper coach.

== Honours ==
=== Club ===
Beveren

- Belgian First Division: 1983–84
- Belgian Cup: 1982–83; Runner-up 1984–85
- Belgian Supercup: 1984; Runner-up 1983

Anderlecht

- Belgian First Division: 1990–91, 1992–93, 1993–94, 1994–95, 1999–2000, 2000–01
- Belgian Cup: 1987–88, 1988–89, 1993–94
- Belgian Super Cup: 1985, 1987, 1993, 1995, 2000, 2001
- Belgian League Cup: 2000
- Belgian Sports Team of the Year: 2000
- European Cup Winners' Cup: 1989-90 (runners-up)
- Jules Pappaert Cup: 2000, 2001
- Bruges Matins: 1988

=== Individual ===
- Belgian Professional Goalkeeper of the Year: 1994, 2000
- Belgian Fair Play Award: 1995-96
