= List of Club Brugge KV captains =

Club Brugge KV is a football club based in Bruges in Belgium. It was founded in 1891 and is one of the top clubs in Belgium.

== List of club captains ==
Below is a list of former club captains in the history of Club Brugge KV

- (Belgium) Rune (1986–91)
- (Belgium) Franky Van der Elst (1991–99)
- (Belgium) Vital Borkelmans (1999-00)
- (Belgium) Gert Verheyen (2000–02)
- (Belgium) Dany Verlinden (2002–04)
- (Belgium) Timmy Simons (2004–05)
- (Belgium) Gert Verheyen (2005–06)
- (Belgium) Sven Vermant (2006–08)
- (Belgium) Philippe Clement (2008–09)
- (Belgium) Stijn Stijnen (2009–10)
- (Belgium) Carl Hoefkens (2010–12)
- (Suriname) Ryan Donk (2012–13)
- (Belgium) Timmy Simons (2013–17)
- (Netherlands) Ruud Vormer (2017–22)
- (Belgium) Hans Vanaken (2022–)
