= Dany Verlinden =

Belgian footballer

Personal information
- Full name: Daniël Verlinden
- Date of birth: 15 August 1963 (age 63)
- Place of birth: Aarschot, Belgium
- Height: 1.75 m (5 ft 9 in)
- Position: Goalkeeper

Youth career
- 1973–1975: Ourodenberg Sport
- 1975–1980: Lierse

Senior career*
Years	Team	Apps	(Gls)
1980–1988	Lierse	204	(0)
1988–2004	Club Brugge	433	(0)
Total		637	(0)

International career
1998	Belgium	1	(0)

Managerial career
- 2004–2012: Club Brugge (goalkeeper coach)
- 2013–2014: Club Africain (goalkeeper coach)
- * Club domestic league appearances and goals

Daniël 'Dany' Verlinden (born 15 August 1963) is a Belgian retired professional footballer who played as a goalkeeper.

Often referred to as De Muur ("the wall"), he spent most of his career at Club Brugge, having played into his 40s. Dany is the father of Thibaud Verlinden, who is also a professional footballer.

== Club career ==
Verlinden was born in Aarschot, Flemish Brabant. Having arrived at Club Brugge K.V. from Lierse S.K. in 1988, he gained first-choice status in his second year and, except for one season, never lost it again. He ranked the second most-capped player for the club in the Belgian Pro League, trailing only Franky Van der Elst, and was instrumental in the side's five league conquests (with the addition of as many cups and nine supercups).

In December 2003, Verlinden became the oldest footballer ever to play in the UEFA Champions League, aged 40 years and 116 days. Alessandro Costacurta of A.C. Milan took over the record on 21 November 2006, when the Italian played in a 1–0 group stage away defeat against AEK Athens aged 40 years and 211 days. Verlinden, however, held the European record for longest time spent in goal without conceding, managing to keep a clean sheet a total of 1,390 minutes in the Belgian league between 3 March and 26 September 1990.

== International career ==
Verlinden played once for Belgium, and was called up for the squad at the 1994 and 1998 FIFA World Cups. His sole cap was obtained on 25 March 1998, as he played the full 90 minutes in a 2–2 friendly home draw to Norway.

== Coaching career ==
After his playing career Verlinden remained with Club Brugge, as a goalkeeping coach, until his unceremonious dismissal in 2012.

From the season 2018–19 on he was the goalkeeper coach of Cercle Brugge.

== Honours ==
Club Brugge

- Belgian First Division: 1989–90, 1991–92, 1995–96, 1997–98, 2002–03
- Belgian Cup: 1990–91, 1994–95, 1995–96, 2001–02, 2003–04
- Belgian Supercup: 1988, 1990, 1991, 1992, 1994, 1996, 1998
- Bruges Matins: 1990, 1992, 1993, 1995, 1996, 1998, 2000, 2001
- Amsterdam Tournament: 1990
- Jules Pappaert Cup: 1991, 1995

Individual

- Belgian Professional Goalkeeper of the Year: 1992–93, 2002–03
