= Franky Van der Elst =

Belgian footballer

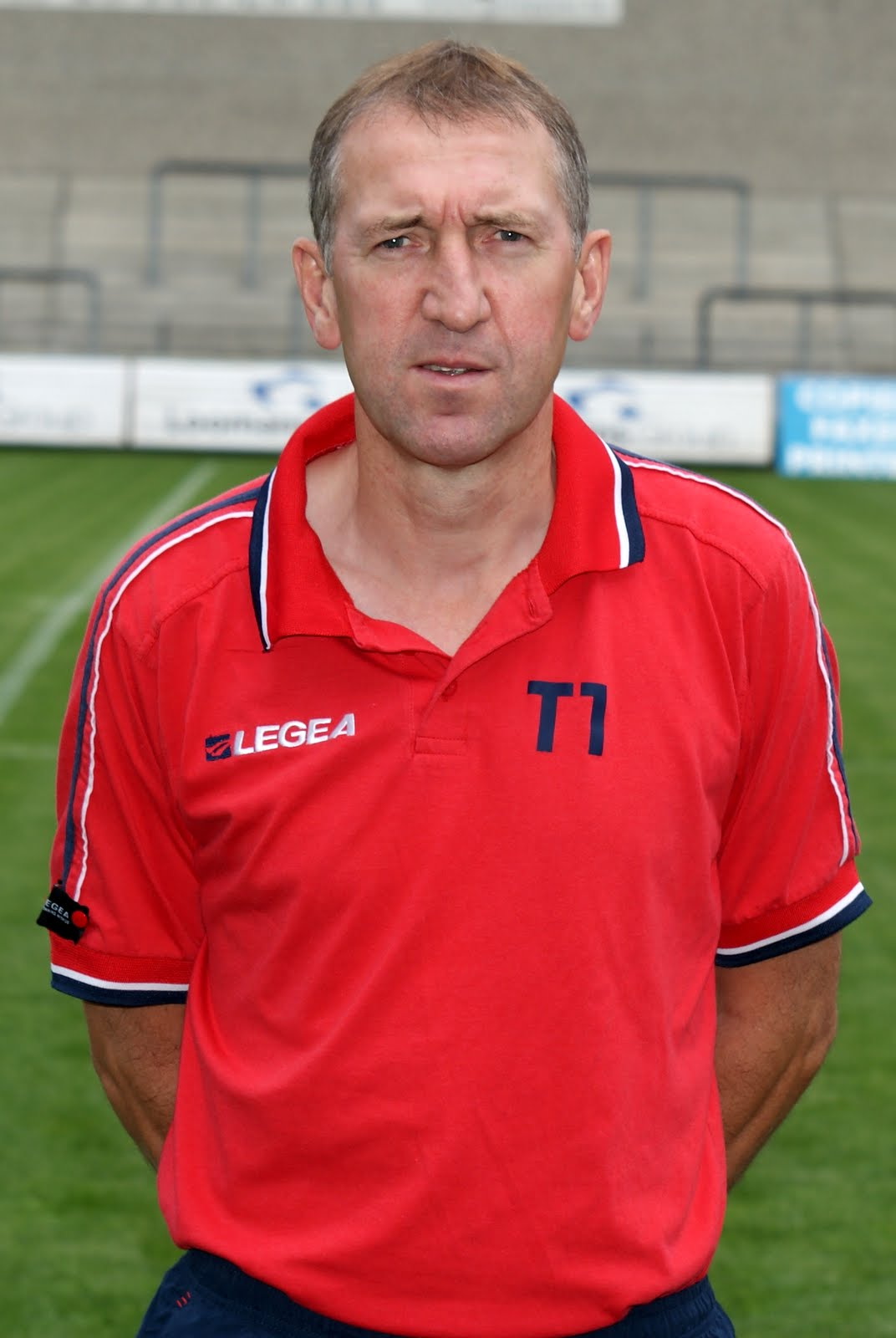
- Van der Elst in 2010

Personal information
- Date of birth: 30 April 1961 (age 65)
- Place of birth: Ninove, Belgium
- Height: 1.84 m (6 ft 0 in)
- Position: Defensive midfielder

Youth career
- Blauw-Wit Lombeek

Senior career*
Years	Team	Apps	(Gls)
1978–1984	Molenbeek	103	(5)
1984–1999	Club Brugge	466	(15)
Total		569	(20)

International career
1984–1998	Belgium	86	(1)

Managerial career
- 1999–2003: Germinal Beerschot
- 2003–2004: Lokeren
- 2005–2007: Club Brugge (assistant)
- 2008: FC Brussels
- 2009–2011: Lommel United
- 2011–2012: Sint-Truiden
- 2014–2016: Roeselare
- 2018: Oostende (assistant)
- 2019: Oostende (caretaker)
- * Club domestic league appearances and goals

Franky Van der Elst (born 30 April 1961) is a Belgian retired professional footballer who played as a defensive midfielder. He later worked as a manager.

During a 21-year professional career he played mainly with Club Brugge, being regarded as a legend there and briefly coaching the team in the 2000s. Also, he was named by Pelé as one of the top 125 greatest living footballers, in March 2004.

Van der Elst won 86 caps for the Belgium national team, representing the country in four World Cups and retiring at nearly 40 years of age.

== Playing career ==
Born in Ninove, Van der Elst started his professional career at R.W.D. Molenbeek, earning his first call-up for Belgium in 1982. Two years later, he moved to Club Brugge KV.

=== Club Brugge ===
Franky Van der Elst stayed with the club until he finished his career in 1999 with the club runners up in the league. He went on to total over 500 overall appearances with the side (466 in the league alone); during four seasons, he often partnered in midfield his namesake Leo – no relation.

Van der Elst won the Golden Shoe twice in his career, an accomplishment for an eminently defensive-minded player. He also appeared in four FIFA World Cups from 1986 to 1998, only scoring once for his country in nearly 90 matches, in a 2–2 friendly draw against Norway on 25 March 1998.

== Coaching career ==
After retiring at the age of 38, Van der Elst was appointed as manager at K.F.C. Germinal Beerschot. After four relatively successful years he was replaced by Marc Brys, and subsequently joined K.S.C. Lokeren Oost-Vlaanderen.

In 2005, Van der Elst returned to 'his' Club Brugge, as an assistant, joining former teammates – both in club and country – Jan Ceulemans, Marc Degryse, Dany Verlinden and René Verheyen. He remained with the team when Verheyen and Ceulemans were fired in 2006, but was eventually shown the door the following year, with head coach Emilio Ferrera.

After a very short spell with FC Brussels, Van der Elst moved to K.V.S.K. United Overpelt-Lommel, both clubs in the second level.

== Career statistics ==
=== Club ===
Appearances and goals by club, season and competition
Club	Season	League			National cup (Note: Includes Belgian Cup)		Other		Europe		Total	
Club	Season	Division	Apps	Goals	Apps	Goals	Apps	Goals	Apps	Goals	Apps	Goals
Molenbeek	1978–79	Belgian Pro League	1	0	0	0	—		—		1	0
Molenbeek	1979–80	Belgian Pro League	0	0	0	0	—		—		0	0
Molenbeek	1980–81	Belgian Pro League	6	0	0	0	—		—		6	0
Molenbeek	1981–82	Belgian Pro League	33	1	1	0	—		1 (Note: Appearances in UEFA Intertoto Cup)	0	35	1
Molenbeek	1982–83	Belgian Pro League	32	1	1	0	—		—		35	2
Molenbeek	1983–84	Belgian Pro League	31	3	1	0	—		—		32	2
Molenbeek	Total		103	5	5	0	0	0	1	0	109	5
Club Brugge	1984–85	Belgian Pro League	33	1	4 (Note: Appearances in UEFA Cup)	0	—		4	0	41	1
Club Brugge	1985–86	Belgian Pro League	34	2	9	0	—		4	1	47	3
Club Brugge	1986–87	Belgian Pro League	34	0	4	0	1 (Note: Appearances in Belgian Super Cup)	0	2 (Note: Appearances in UEFA Cup Winners' Cup)	0	43	1
Club Brugge	1987–88	Belgian Pro League	32	0	2	0	—		10	0	44	1
Club Brugge	1988–89	Belgian Pro League	34	1	6	0	1	0	4 (Note: Appearances in UEFA Champions League)	0	45	1
Club Brugge	1989–90	Belgian Pro League	34	1	2	0	—		4	0	40	1
Club Brugge	1990–91	Belgian Pro League	34	3	8	0	1	0	4	0	47	3
Club Brugge	1991–92	Belgian Pro League	29	3	3	0	1	0	7	0	40	3
Club Brugge	1992–93	Belgian Pro League	32	1	2	0	1	0	8	0	43	1
Club Brugge	1993–94	Belgian Pro League	20	0	5	0	—		—		25	0
Club Brugge	1994–95	Belgian Pro League	29	0	6	0	1	0	6	0	42	0
Club Brugge	1995–96	Belgian Pro League	30	0	6	1	1	0	4	0	41	2
Club Brugge	1996–97	Belgian Pro League	29	2	1	0	—		8 (Note: 6 appearances in UEFA Cup, 2 appearances in UEFA Champions League qualification)	0	38	2
Club Brugge	1997–98	Belgian Pro League	32	0	6	0	1	0	5	1	44	1
Club Brugge	1998–99	Belgian Pro League	30	1	1	0	2 (Note: 1 appearance in Belgian Super Cup, 1 appearance in Belgian League Cup)	0	9 (Note: 5 appearances in UEFA Cup, 4 appearances in UEFA Champions League qualification)	0	42	1
Club Brugge	Total		468	17	65	1	10	0	79	3	622	21
Career total			571	22	70	1	10	0	80	3	731	26

== Honours and awards ==
Club Brugge

- Belgian First Division: 1987–88, 1989–90, 1991–92, 1995–96, 1997–98
- Belgian Cup: 1985–86, 1990–91, 1994–95, 1995–96
- Belgian Supercup: 1986, 1988, 1990, 1991, 1992, 1994, 1996, 1998
- Bruges Matins: 1984, 1990, 1992, 1993, 1995, 1996, 1998
- Amsterdam Tournament: 1990
- Jules Pappaert Cup: 1991, 1995

Belgium

- FIFA World Cup: fourth place 1986

Individual

- FIFA World Cup participations: 1986, 1990, 1994, 1998
- Belgian Golden Shoe: 1990, 1996
- Belgian Fair Play Award: 1997
- FIFA 100: 2004
- The Best Golden Shoe Team: 2011
- Honorary citizen of Roosdaal: 2019
- Pro League Hall of Fame: 2024
