= R.F.C. Seraing =

R.F.C. Seraing may refer to:

- R.F.C. Seraing (1904), a defunct football club in Belgium
- R.F.C. Seraing (1922), an active football club in Belgium
