= Marc Degryse =

Belgian footballer

- Degryse with Anderlecht in 1992

Personal information
- Full name: Marc Gabriel Degryse
- Date of birth: 4 September 1965 (age 61)
- Place of birth: Roeselare, Belgium
- Height: 1.72 m (5 ft 8 in)
- Position: Forward

Youth career
- VC Ardooie

Senior career*
Years	Team	Apps	(Gls)
1983–1989	Club Brugge	179	(95)
1989–1995	Anderlecht	170	(66)
1995–1996	Sheffield Wednesday	34	(8)
1996–1998	PSV	31	(4)
1998–1999	Gent	29	(10)
1999–2002	Germinal Beerschot	97	(26)
Total		540	(209)

International career
1981	Belgium U16	10	(2)
1981	Belgium U17	3	(0)
1982–1984	Belgium U18	9	(2)
1983–1984	Belgium U19	7	(6)
1985–1987	Belgium U21	4	(0)
1984–1996	Belgium	63	(23)
- * Club domestic league appearances and goals

Marc Gabriel Degryse (born 4 September 1965), nicknamed Le Lutin d'Ardooie ("The Lutin/Imp of Ardooie") and The Little One, is a Belgian retired professional footballer who played as a forward.

In a 19-year professional career he played mainly for Club Brugge and Anderlecht (six seasons apiece), making his senior debuts at 17 and scoring nearly 200 official goals both clubs combined to win a total of ten major titles. He also competed briefly in England for Sheffield Wednesday.

A Belgium international for 12 years, Degryse represented the nation in two World Cups.

== Club career ==
Born in Roeselare, West Flanders, Degryse played with equal success in the Belgian Pro League with giants Club Brugge and Anderlecht, moving to the latter in 1989 for a then-record €2.25 million and proceeding to win five national championships combined, three in a row.

He moved for £1.5 million to Sheffield Wednesday in the 1995 summer, but left after just one season as an important unit in helping the English club's eventual escape from relegation, after a 15th-place finish. During his time in South Yorkshire, he and teammate Orlando Trustfull had a cameo role in Sheffield-based film The Full Monty, but the scenes did not make the final cut.

In the following two campaigns Degryse played in the Netherlands with PSV Eindhoven, where he often struggled with injuries. He retired in 2002 at the age of nearly 37, after spells back in his country with K.A.A. Gent and Germinal Beerschot, having played 540 professional matches and scored 209 goals.

Degryse returned to Club Brugge as a technical director the following year, before he eventually resigned due to bad results in late January 2007, alongside longtime former teammate, coach Franky Van der Elst.

== International career ==
On the international level, Degryse played 63 matches with the Belgium national team and scored 23 goals. He was summoned for the squads at two FIFA World Cups: 1990 and 1994, netting twice in seven games.

Degryse's debut came just one day after his 19th birthday, in a friendly with Argentina.

== Career statistics ==
=== Club ===
Appearances and goals by club, season and competition
Club	Season	League		Cup		League Cup		Continental		Other		Total		Ref
Club	Season	Apps	Goals	Apps	Goals	Apps	Goals	Apps	Goals	Apps	Goals	Apps	Goals	Ref
Club Brugge	1983–84	20	9	2	0	—		—		—		22	9	
Club Brugge	1984–85	34	21	4	0	—		4	1	—		42	22	
Club Brugge	1985–86	31	16	8	4	—		3	0	—		42	20	
Club Brugge	1986–87	32	15	4	0	—		2	0	—		38	15	
Club Brugge	1987–88	34	22	3	2	—		10	0	—		47	24	
Club Brugge	1988–89	28	12	5	1	—		2	0	—		35	13	
Club Brugge	Total	179	95	26	7	—		21	1	—		226	103	
Anderlecht	1989–90	31	18	5	4	—		9	4	—		45	26	
Anderlecht	1990–91	32	12	3	2	—		7	0	—		42	14	
Anderlecht	1991–92	28	5	2	0	—		9	4	—		39	9	
Anderlecht	1992–93	32	11	4	1	—		5	2	—		41	14	
Anderlecht	1993–94	19	9	3	2	—		3	0	—		25	11	
Anderlecht	1994–95	28	11	5	2	—		4	0	—		37	13	
Anderlecht	Total	170	66	22	11	—		37	10	—		229	87	
Sheffield Wednesday	1995–96	34	8	1	0	3	4	—		—		38	12	
PSV	1996–97	23	3	—		—		3	0	1	2	27	5	
PSV	1997–98	8	1	2	0	—		3	0	1	0	14	1	
PSV	Total	31	4	2	0	—		6	0	2	2	41	6	
Gent	1998–99	29	10	—		—		—		—		29	10	
Germinal Beerschot	1999–2000	31	10	—		—		—		—		31	10	
Germinal Beerschot	2000–01	33	8	—		—		—		—		33	8	
Germinal Beerschot	2001–02	33	8	—		—		—		—		33	8	
Germinal Beerschot	Total	97	26	—		—		—		—			26	
Career total		540	209	51	18	3	4	64	11	2	2		244	

=== International ===
Country	Season	Competitive		Friendlies		Total		Ref
Country	Season	Apps	Goals	Apps	Goals	Apps	Goals	Ref
Belgium	1984–85	1	0	1	0	2	0	
Belgium	1985–86	1	0	—		1	0	
Belgium	1986–87	—		—		—		
Belgium	1987–88	3	1	4	1	7	2	
Belgium	1988–89	3	2	2	1	5	3	
Belgium	1989–90	7	2	6	3	13	5	
Belgium	1990–91	3	1	2	0	5	1	
Belgium	1991–92	4	1	2	0	6	1	
Belgium	1992–93	6	1	—		6	1	
Belgium	1993–94	3	1	3	4	6	5	
Belgium	1994–95	6	4	—		6	4	
Belgium	1995–96	2	0	1	0	3	0	
Belgium	1996–97	3	1	—		3	1	
Career total		42	14	21	9	63	23	

Scores and results list Belgium's goal tally first, score column indicates score after each Degryse goal.

List of international goals scored by Marc Degryse
No.	Date	Venue	Opponent	Score	Result	Competition	Ref.
1	11 November 1987	Heysel Stadium, Brussels, Belgium	Luxembourg	2–0	3–0	Euro 1988 qualifying	
2	19 January 1988	Ramat Gan Stadium, Ramat Gan, Israel	Israel	1–0	3–2	Friendly	
3	29 April 1989	Heysel Stadium, Brussels, Belgium	Czechoslovakia	1–0	2–1	1990 World Cup qualification	
4	29 April 1989	Heysel Stadium, Brussels, Belgium	Czechoslovakia	2–1	2–1	1990 World Cup qualification	
5	8 June 1989	Terry Fox, Ottawa, Canada	Canada	2–0	2–0	Friendly	
6	23 August 1989	Olympiastadion, Bruges, Belgium	Denmark	1–0	3–0	Friendly	
7	11 October 1989	St. Jakob, Basel, Switzerland	Switzerland	1–1	2–2	1990 World Cup qualification	
8	2 June 1990	Heysel Stadium, Brussels, Belgium	Mexico	1–0	3–0	Friendly	
9	2 June 1990	Heysel Stadium, Brussels, Belgium	Mexico	2–0	3–0	Friendly	
10	12 June 1990	Marcantonio Bentegodi, Verona, Italy	South Korea	1–0	2–0	1990 FIFA World Cup	
11	27 March 1991	Constant Vanden Stock, Brussels, Belgium	Wales	1–0	1–1	Euro 1992 qualifying	
12	11 September 1991	Neie Stadium, Luxembourg, Luxembourg	Luxembourg	2–0	2–0	Euro 1992 qualifying	
13	18 November 1992	Constant Vanden Stock, Brussels, Belgium	Wales	2–0	2–0	1994 World Cup qualification	
14	4 June 1994	Heysel Stadium, Brussels, Belgium	Zambia	3–0	9–0	Friendly	
15	4 June 1994	Heysel Stadium, Brussels, Belgium	Zambia	4–0	9–0	Friendly	
16	4 June 1994	Heysel Stadium, Brussels, Belgium	Zambia	8–0	9–0	Friendly	
17	8 June 1994	Heysel Stadium, Brussels, Belgium	Hungary	2–0	3–1	Friendly	
18	19 June 1994	Citrus Bowl, Orlando, United States	Morocco	1–0	1–0	1994 World Cup	
19	7 September 1994	Constant Vanden Stock, Brussels, Belgium	Armenia	2–0	2–0	Euro 1996 qualifying	
20	12 October 1994	Parken Stadium, Copenhagen, Denmark	Denmark	1–0	1–3	Euro 1996 qualifying	
21	17 December 1994	Constant Vanden Stock, Brussels, Belgium	Spain	1–0	1–4	Euro 1996 qualifying	
22	29 March 1995	Ramón Sánchez Pizjuán, Seville, Spain	Spain	1–1	1–1	Euro 1996 qualifying	
23	31 August 1996	King Baudouin, Brussels, Belgium	Turkey	1–0	2–1	1998 World Cup qualification	

== Honours ==
Club Brugge

- Belgian First Division: 1987–88
- Belgian Cup: 1985–86
- Belgian Super Cup: 1986
- Bruges Matins: 1984

Anderlecht

- Belgian First Division: 1990–91, 1992–93, 1993–94, 1994–95
- Belgian Cup: 1993–94
- Belgian Super Cup: 1993
- European Cup Winners' Cup: runner-up 1989–90

PSV

- Eredivisie: 1996–97
- Johan Cruyff Shield: 1996, 1997
- KNVB Cup: runner-up 1997–98

Individual

- Man of the Season (Belgian First Division): 1987–88, 2000–01
- Belgian Golden Shoe: 1991
- Belgian Professional Footballer of the Year: 1987–88, 1989–90, 1994–95, 1999–2000
- Sheffield Wednesday F.C. Player of the Year: 1995–96
- Belgian Fair Play Award: 2000–01, 2001–02
- Goal of the Season: 2000
- Golden Shoe Lifetime Achievement Award: 2001
- Platina Eleven (Best Team in 50 Years of Golden Shoe Winners) (2003)
