= Gilbert Bodart =

Belgian football manager and former player

Personal information
- Date of birth: 2 September 1962 (age 64)
- Place of birth: Ougrée, Belgium
- Height: 1.81 m (5 ft 11 in)
- Position: Goalkeeper

Youth career
- 1972–1976: CS Verlaine
- 1976–1981: Standard Liège

Senior career*
Years	Team	Apps	(Gls)
1981–1996	Standard Liège	445	(10)
1996–1997	Bordeaux	38	(0)
1997–1998	Standard Liège	25	(4)
1998–2000	Brescia	55	(0)
2000–2001	Ravenna	13	(0)
2001–2002	Beveren	11	(0)
Total		587	(14)

International career
1985–1995	Belgium	12	(0)

Managerial career
- 2002–2003: CS Visé
- 2003–2005: KV Oostende
- 2005: Eendracht Aalst
- 2005–2006: La Louvière
- 2006–200?: KSK Wevelgem City
- 2008: RJ Rochefort
- * Club domestic league appearances and goals

Gilbert Bodart (born 2 September 1962) is a Belgian football manager and former player.

== Playing career ==
Bodart was born in Ougrée, Belgium. A goalkeeper, he played a long time with Standard Liège. Bodart also played 12 times with Belgium from 1986 to 1995. In 1996 the goalkeeper moved to the French team of Girondins de Bordeaux.

He played few matches with the national team as he was in competition with Jean-Marie Pfaff and then with Michel Preud'homme. Bodart was nevertheless part of the team in the 1986 World Cup of which Belgium reached the semifinals. He collected 12 caps in 55 selections.

== Managerial career ==
He worked as a manager for La Louvière in the Jupiler League from 2005 until 21 February 2006.

== Personal life ==
Bodart is the uncle of the Belgian goalkeeper and youth international Arnaud Bodart.

In August 2008, Bodart was arrested for his involvement in a robbery at the Caves of Han where he had been working in the marketing team since July. Het Laatste Nieuws reported he had been the informant of the robber. It was revealed Bodart had financial problems due a gambling habit. He was also suspected of counterfeiting.

In June 2018 Bodart was reported to have made death threats against former teammate Eric Gerets after Gerets had started a relationship with his former girlfriend.

On 11 March 2024, Bodart made a suicide attempt by jumping in the river Meuse. He had posted on Facebook that "he could not cope with life any longer".

== Honours ==
Standard Liège

- Belgian First Division: 1981–82, 1982–83
- Belgian Cup: 1980–81, 1992–93
- European Cup Winners' Cup: runner-up 1981–82

Belgium

- FIFA World Cup: fourth place 1986

Individual

- Belgian Goalkeeper of the Year: 1985, 1986, 1992, 1995
