= R.F.C. Seraing (1904) =

Belgian football club

- Full name: Royal Football Club Seraing
- Nickname: Les Métallos (The Metalworkers)
- Founded: 1904
- Dissolved: 1996
- Ground: Stade du Pairay, Seraing
- Capacity: 8,207
Home colours	Away colours

R.F.C. Seraing was a Belgian football club from the municipality of Seraing, province of Liège, founded in 1904.

== History ==
It was created in 1904 (122 years ago) as F.C. Sérésien and registered to the FA in 1906 receiving matricule n°17. The club received the "Royal" designation upon 25 years of existence, becoming RFC Sérésien. From 1930 until 1952, the club was playing steadily at the second level of Belgian football, however the following thirty years, the club would hover between the second, third and fourth level of Belgian Football, moving up or down a level roughly every three or four seasons, before finally reaching the Belgian First Division in the 1982–83 season. The club was able to stay at the top level for five seasons and briefly even dropped back to the third level, before returning to the highest level for the 1993–94 season, immediately finishing in third position, qualifying for the 1994–95 UEFA Cup where the club lost in the first round on away goals to FC Dynamo Moscow.

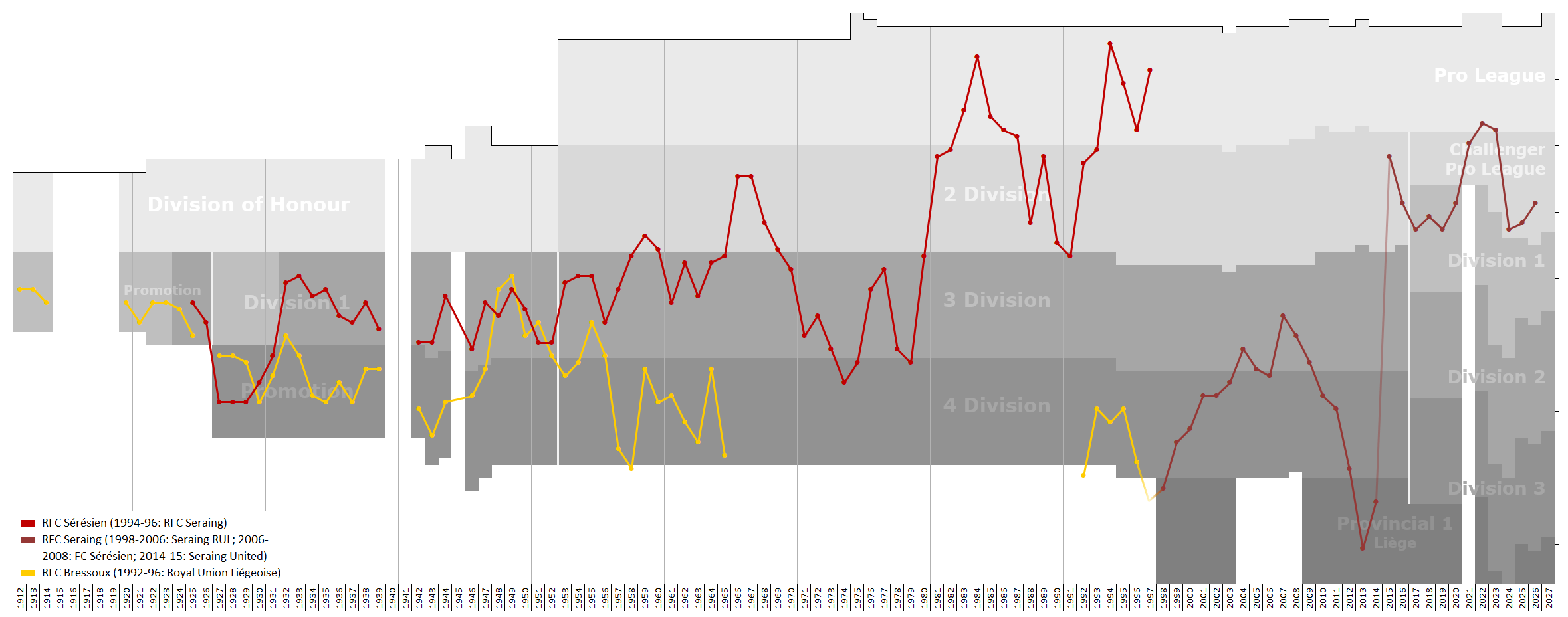
Historical chart of RFC Seraing league performance

The club name changed in 1994 to RFC Seraing and two years later, the club was forced to merge with neighbours Standard Liège (matricule n°16) due to financial difficulties. Officially, the club matricule was terminated and the club ceased to exist in 1996 (30 years ago).

At that same time, another club from the city, called Royale Union Liégeoise (matricule 23, founded in 1922 and formerly known as RFC Bressoux), renamed itself to Seraing RUL and started playing at the Stade du Pairay where RFC Seraing played until its default, but it is an entirely different club and is entirely distinct from the former RFC Seraing. Seraing RUL was at that level playing at the fourth level of Belgian football. But there's no link and no fusion between these two clubs. This new club would remain at the lower levels of Belgian football, never higher than the third level. It 2006, this club changed its name to RFC Seraing to recapture the past of the club whose place it took, but dropped further, even sinking to the fifth level in 2014, at which point it bought the rights (and place) of another club (Boussu Dour Borinage) to swap places. As a result, the club was able to immediately jump three levels and started the 2014–15 season in the Belgian Second Division. It started in the Second Division under the new name Seraing United, but reverted to RFC Seraing one season later.
