= 2005–06 Belgian First Division =

103rd season of top-tier football in Belgium

Belgian First Division
- Season: 2005–06
- Champions: Anderlecht
- Relegated: La Louvière
- Champions League: Anderlecht; Standard Liège
- UEFA Cup: Club Brugge; Zulte Waregem
- Matches: 306
- Goals: 769 (2.51 per match)
- Top goalscorer: Tosin Dosunmu (18 goals)

The 2005–06 season of the Belgian Jupiler League began on August 5, 2005 and ended on May 5, 2006. Anderlecht won the title on the last day of competition.

== Promoted teams ==
Location of teams in Belgian First Division 2005–06

These teams were promoted from the second division at the start of the season:

- S.V. Zulte-Waregem (second division champion)
- K.S.V. Roeselare (playoff winner)

== Relegated teams ==
This team was relegated to the second division at the end of the season:

- R.A.A. Louviéroise

== Final league table ==
Pos	Team	Pld	W	D	L	GF	GA	GD	Pts	Qualification or relegation
1	Anderlecht (C)	34	20	10	4	72	27	+45	70	Qualification to Champions League group stage
2	Standard Liège	34	19	8	7	51	28	+23	65	Qualification to Champions League third qualifying round
3	Club Brugge	34	18	10	6	51	33	+18	64	Qualification to UEFA Cup second qualifying round
4	Gent	34	18	7	9	48	34	+14	61	Qualification to Intertoto Cup third round
5	Genk	34	16	9	9	52	38	+14	57	
6	Germinal Beerschot	34	14	7	13	50	45	+5	49	
7	Zulte Waregem (W)	34	14	7	13	51	49	+2	49	Qualification to UEFA Cup first round
8	Lokeren	34	12	11	11	48	49	−1	47	
9	Westerlo	34	13	7	14	42	48	−6	46	
10	FC Brussels	34	12	10	12	30	30	0	46	
11	Charleroi	34	11	12	11	39	39	0	45	
12	Roeselare	34	10	11	13	44	42	+2	41	Qualification to UEFA Cup first qualifying round
13	Cercle Brugge	34	10	8	16	38	56	−18	38	
14	Mouscron	34	11	4	19	43	43	0	37	
15	Sint-Truiden	34	8	10	16	36	49	−13	34	
16	Beveren	34	9	6	19	35	55	−20	33	
17	Lierse (O)	34	8	8	18	22	52	−30	32	Qualification to the Relegation play-offs
18	La Louvière (R)	34	4	14	16	26	56	−30	26	Relegation to 2006–07 Belgian Second Division

(C) Champions; (O) Play-off winners; (R) Relegated; (W) Cup winners

== Relegation/Promotion play-off ==
Pos	Team	Pld	W	D	L	GF	GA	GD	Pts	Qualification
1	Lierse (O)	6	4	0	2	13	7	+6	12	Retained place in 2006–07 Belgian First Division
2	Lommel	6	3	1	2	11	9	+2	10	
3	VW Hamme	6	3	0	3	8	9	−1	9	
4	Geel	6	1	1	4	8	15	−7	4	

(O) Play-off winners

== Results ==
Home \ Away	AND	GBA	BEV	CER	CLU	CHA	GNK	GNT	LIE	LOK	LOU	BRU	MOU	ROE	STV	STA	WES	ZWA
Anderlecht		3–1	4–0	2–2	2–2	3–1	4–1	3–0	3–0	1–1	6–0	2–0	3–1	5–1	3–0	2–0	5–0	3–0
Germinal Beerschot	2–0		3–1	5–0	1–1	0–1	2–2	2–1	4–0	2–1	1–1	0–1	1–0	2–2	4–0	2–2	0–1	2–0
Beveren	0–1	0–0		5–1	0–1	1–1	0–2	0–1	4–1	1–3	1–0	0–2	1–0	1–1	1–1	0–2	4–1	2–1
Cercle Brugge	0–2	3–0	1–1		0–1	2–0	1–1	1–2	3–0	2–0	1–0	0–1	1–1	2–2	2–1	0–3	2–2	2–4
Club Brugge	0–2	2–0	1–0	2–0		2–1	3–0	2–1	3–1	0–1	4–0	3–0	2–0	1–0	2–1	1–1	2–1	2–1
Charleroi	1–1	2–0	4–0	0–1	3–3		2–1	2–0	0–1	3–1	0–2	1–0	1–0	1–1	0–1	0–0	2–1	2–0
Genk	3–3	1–0	2–0	3–1	2–2	0–0		2–1	1–0	2–2	5–0	1–0	1–0	4–1	2–0	0–1	2–0	3–1
Gent	0–0	2–1	3–0	1–0	4–1	2–2	2–0		1–1	1–2	3–0	2–1	0–0	1–2	1–0	2–1	0–1	1–3
Lierse	0–0	0–2	2–0	0–4	1–1	0–0	1–2	1–3		2–0	0–0	1–1	2–0	1–0	1–0	0–2	2–1	0–2
Lokeren	2–2	1–2	1–1	2–1	2–0	4–2	1–1	1–2	1–0		3–2	1–0	1–1	2–2	1–2	0–0	3–2	2–3
La Louvière	0–0	1–1	2–0	0–0	0–1	2–2	2–3	1–1	1–0	1–1		0–3	0–0	0–0	0–2	2–3	0–3	2–2
Brussels	1–1	0–1	3–1	1–2	1–1	2–2	1–0	0–1	2–1	1–1	0–0		0–1	1–0	0–0	3–1	1–0	1–1
Mouscron	0–1	4–1	1–3	6–0	0–1	0–1	1–0	1–2	5–0	0–2	2–1	1–1		0–1	3–0	2–1	1–0	0–1
Roeselare	0–2	5–1	1–0	1–0	1–1	2–0	1–2	1–1	2–0	4–0	4–1	0–1	5–0		1–1	0–0	0–2	0–3
Sint-Truiden	3–0	1–2	1–0	1–1	2–2	1–1	2–2	1–1	1–1	1–2	1–3	0–1	3–6	1–0		0–0	0–1	2–0
Standard Liège	2–0	3–1	1–3	7–1	2–0	1–0	1–0	0–2	3–1	2–1	1–1	1–0	2–1	0–0	2–0		1–0	1–2
Westerlo	2–1	1–3	4–1	2–0	0–0	1–1	1–1	0–1	0–0	1–1	2–1	3–0	0–5	3–2	2–1	0–2		2–2
Zulte Waregem	1–2	2–1	2–2	3–1	2–1	3–0	1–0	1–2	0–1	1–1	0–0	0–0	4–1	2–1	1–5	1–2	1–2	

Legend: Blue = home team win; Yellow = draw; Red = away team win.

== Top goal scorers ==
Scorer	Goals	Team
(Nigeria) Tosin Dosunmu	18	Germinal Beerschot
(Burundi) Mohammed Tchité	16	Standard Liège
(Burkina Faso) Aristide Bancé	15	Lokeren
(Croatia) Boško Balaban	13	Club Brugge
(Belgium) Kevin Vandenbergh	12	Racing Genk
(Haiti) Wagneau Eloi	11	Roeselare
(Belgium) Mbo Mpenza	11	Anderlecht

== Attendances ==
No.	Club	Average
1	Club Brugge	25,329
2	Anderlecht	24,095
3	Standard	23,263
4	Genk	21,968
5	Charleroi	12,080
6	Gent	8,228
7	Beerschot	7,511
8	STVV	7,441
9	Lierse	7,358
10	Cercle Brugge	5,945
11	Zulte Waregem	5,908
12	Lokeren	5,847
13	Westerlo	5,629
14	Roeselare	5,521
15	Mouscron	5,461
16	Brussels	4,809
17	RAAL	4,549
18	Beveren	4,338

== See also ==
- 2005–06 in Belgian football
