= Eric Viscaal =

Dutch footballer

Personal information
- Full name: Eric Viscaal
- Date of birth: 20 March 1968 (age 58)
- Place of birth: Eindhoven, Netherlands
- Height: 1.80 m (5 ft 11 in)
- Position: Striker

Senior career*
Years	Team	Apps	(Gls)
1986–1988	PSV Eindhoven	24	(8)
1988–1989	K.S.K. Beveren	34	(17)
1989–1990	Lierse S.K.	29	(14)
1990–1995	K.A.A. Gent	153	(57)
1995–1996	Grasshopper	13	(7)
1996–2001	De Graafschap	165	(56)
2001–2003	KV Mechelen	52	(10)
2003–2006	Dilbeek Sport	65	(16)
2007–2009	VK Weerde		
Total		535	(185)

International career
1992	Netherlands	5	(0)
- * Club domestic league appearances and goals

Eric Viscaal (born 20 March 1968) is a former football player from the Netherlands, who played much of his career as a forward in Belgium (Beveren, KAA Gent, KV Mechelen). He earned five caps for the Netherlands national team and was part of their squad at UEFA Euro 1992. Viscaal won the Young Professional Footballer of the Year award for the 1988–89 season.

== Honours ==
=== Club ===
PSV

- Eredivisie (2): 1986–87, 1987–88
- KNVB Cup (1): 1987–88
- European Cup (1): 1987–88

Grasshopper

- Swiss Super League (1): 1995–96

== Notes ==
- In 1989 he was chosen Young Professional of the Year.
- In the 1992–93-season during the match Cercle Brugge - KAA Gent the goalkeeper of Gent was sent off the pitch with a red card. Cercle Brugge was granted a penalty kick. Gent was without any substitutes so Viscaal was sent to the goal and stopped the penalty kicked by Josip Weber. A minute later a penalty kick was given to Gent. Viscaal walked to the other end of the pitch and scored the equalizer. The final score being in the final seconds: 1 - 1.
