= 1995–96 Belgian Cup =

Tournament details
- Country: Belgium

Final positions
- Champions: Club Brugge
- Runners-up: Cercle Brugge

Tournament statistics
- Matches played: 33
- Goals scored: 96 (2.91 per match)
- Top goal scorer: Christophe Lauwers (5 goals)

The 1995–96 Belgian Cup was the 41st season of the main knockout competition in Belgian association football, the Belgian Cup.

== Final rounds ==
For the first time, the final phase started in the round of 32 when all clubs from the first division entered the competition (18 clubs plus 14 clubs from the qualifications). All rounds were played in one leg except for the semifinals. The final game was played at the Heysel Stadium in Brussels and won by Club Brugge against Cercle Brugge.

=== Bracket ===
Round of 32
Beveren	3
Mouscron	1
Club Brugge	1
Poederlee	0
Westerlo	0(0)
Tilleur FC Liège	0(3)
Molenbeek	2
Herentals	1
Anderlecht	2*
Lierse	1
Denderleeuw	1
Genk	2
Deinze	1(4)
Sérésien	1(5)
Sint-Truidense	3
Wavre	0
KV Mechelen	1
Antwerp	3*
Germinal Ekeren	1
Oostende	0
Boom	0
Waregem	3
R Charleroi SC	0
Standard Liège	1
Cercle Brugge	2
Lommelse	1
Lokeren	2
Gent	1
Harelbeke	0
Aalst	1
Beerschot	3
Kortrijk	0

Round of 16
Beveren	1
Club Brugge	4
Tilleur FC Liège	2(4)
Molenbeek	2(3)
Anderlecht	3*
Genk	0
Sérésien	1
Sint-Truidense	4
Antwerp	3*
Germinal Ekeren	2
Waregem	1
Standard Liège	0
Cercle Brugge	4
Lokeren	1
Aalst	0(2)
Beerschot	0(4)

Quarter-finals
Club Brugge	2*
Tilleur FC Liège	1
Anderlecht	0
Sint-Truidense	1
Antwerp	3
Waregem	0
Cercle Brugge	2*
Beerschot	1

Semifinals
Club Brugge	3	3
Sint-Truidense	1	1
Antwerp	0	3
Cercle Brugge	3	3

Final
Club Brugge	2
Cercle Brugge	1

* after extra time

=== Final ===
26 May 1996
16:00

Club Brugge	2–1	Cercle Brugge
Stanić 27', 41'	Report	Torma 5'

King Baudouin Stadium, Brussels
Attendance: 30,000
Referee: Robert Jeurissen
