= 1993–94 Belgian First Division =

91st season of top-tier football in Belgium

Belgian First Division
- Season: 1993–94
- Champions: R.S.C. Anderlecht
- Relegated: K.S.V. Waregem; K.R.C. Genk

R.S.C. Anderlecht won the title of the 1993–94 season.

== Relegated teams ==
Location of teams in Belgian First Division 1993–94

These teams were relegated to the second division at the end of the season:

- K.S.V. Waregem
- K.R.C. Genk

== Final league table ==
Pos	Team	Pld	W	D	L	GF	GA	GD	Pts	Qualification or relegation
1	R.S.C. Anderlecht	34	24	7	3	79	31	+48	55	Qualified for 1994–95 UEFA Champions League
2	Club Brugge	34	20	13	1	54	19	+35	53	Qualified for 1994–95 UEFA Cup Winners' Cup
3	R.F.C. Seraing	34	15	13	6	50	27	+23	43	Qualified for 1994–95 UEFA Cup
4	R. Charleroi S.C.	34	18	5	11	61	49	+12	41	Qualified for 1994–95 UEFA Cup
5	R. Antwerp F.C.	34	14	13	7	44	38	+6	41	Qualified for 1994–95 UEFA Cup
6	Standard Liège	34	13	12	9	43	22	+21	38	
7	K.V. Oostende	34	10	16	8	45	41	+4	36	
8	Y.R. K.V. Mechelen	34	10	15	9	40	40	0	35	
9	K.S.K. Beveren	34	11	11	12	42	40	+2	33	
10	K.F.C. Germinal Beerschot	34	11	10	13	49	48	+1	32	
11	K.F.C. Lommel S.K.	34	10	10	14	42	50	−8	30	
12	Cercle Brugge K.S.V.	34	9	11	14	52	63	−11	29	
13	R.F.C. de Liège	34	9	11	14	40	59	−19	29	
14	Lierse S.K.	34	7	14	13	30	42	−12	28	
15	K.A.A. Gent	34	7	13	14	43	57	−14	27	
16	R.W.D. Molenbeek	34	7	11	16	32	49	−17	25	
17	K.S.V. Waregem	34	6	7	21	32	62	−30	19	Relegated to Belgian Second Division
18	K.R.C. Genk	34	4	10	20	38	79	−41	18	Relegated to Belgian Second Division

== Results ==
Home \ Away	AND	ANT	BEV	CER	CLU	CHA	EKE	GNK	GNT	RCL	LIE	LOM	MEC	MOL	OST	SER	STA	WAR
Anderlecht		2–0	3–2	2–0	0–3	3–1	5–2	6–2	2–1	6–0	1–0	1–0	1–1	0–0	2–0	0–2	0–0	6–1
Antwerp	0–0		2–0	0–3	0–1	2–1	1–1	3–1	1–1	1–1	0–0	4–0	0–0	1–0	0–4	2–1	1–1	2–0
Beveren	0–2	0–0		4–2	1–1	1–1	3–1	3–1	3–1	3–0	1–1	2–1	1–1	0–0	3–3	1–1	0–2	3–0
Cercle Brugge	1–1	2–4	1–0		2–4	0–1	1–1	1–1	2–2	3–3	4–2	3–0	0–1	1–0	0–0	1–1	1–1	2–1
Club Brugge	0–0	0–0	2–1	2–0		2–1	0–0	2–1	1–2	3–0	1–0	4–1	2–1	5–1	1–0	0–0	1–0	3–1
Charleroi	1–5	3–2	2–1	5–3	0–1		0–0	2–1	4–2	6–4	1–0	3–0	1–0	3–2	2–1	3–1	1–0	2–1
Germinal Ekeren	2–4	1–3	0–0	4–1	0–1	1–0		1–1	2–0	4–1	2–0	4–1	0–2	4–1	1–2	1–2	1–1	1–0
Genk	0–2	0–2	2–0	2–2	2–4	0–4	1–3		3–3	2–2	0–3	1–3	2–0	1–4	2–2	0–0	0–2	2–1
Gent	1–2	1–2	2–3	2–0	0–4	0–0	1–1	2–3		4–1	0–0	1–0	3–1	1–1	1–2	0–0	0–0	2–2
Liége	1–2	0–0	0–2	2–1	0–0	2–1	0–0	4–0	0–0		3–0	1–1	3–2	1–0	1–2	0–0	0–2	1–0
Lierse	1–4	1–1	1–0	3–2	1–1	2–2	3–2	3–1	1–2	0–1		1–1	0–0	1–1	0–1	1–1	1–0	1–2
Lommel	1–1	5–0	2–0	5–1	0–0	2–0	2–1	1–1	1–3	1–2	0–0		3–0	3–1	1–2	0–3	1–0	3–0
Mechelen	1–0	1–1	1–0	0–4	1–1	1–3	3–1	2–2	4–1	2–2	0–0	1–1		3–1	2–0	2–1	1–1	1–1
Molenbeek	3–4	0–1	0–1	1–3	0–0	2–4	1–3	1–1	2–0	2–2	0–0	0–0	0–2		2–1	0–1	1–0	1–0
Oostende	1–3	2–4	1–1	1–1	2–2	1–0	2–2	4–0	2–2	2–0	2–2	1–1	0–0	1–1		0–0	2–0	1–1
Seraing	1–2	4–2	3–0	1–1	1–1	2–2	1–0	3–1	3–0	2–0	2–0	1–0	1–0	0–0	3–0		2–2	5–2
Standard Liège	0–3	0–0	0–0	4–0	0–0	2–0	3–0	2–0	2–0	3–1	3–0	7–0	2–2	0–1	0–0	1–0		2–0
Waregem	2–4	1–2	0–2	2–3	0–1	2–1	0–2	2–1	2–2	2–1	0–1	0–0	1–1	1–2	0–0	2–1	2–0	

Legend: Blue = home team win; Yellow = draw; Red = away team win.

== Top goal scorers ==
Scorer	Goals	Team
(Croatia) Josip Weber	31	Cercle Brugge
(Belgium) Luc Nilis	25	Anderlecht
(Netherlands) John Bosman	20	Anderlecht
(Slovenia) Sašo Udovič	20	Beveren
(Federal Republic of Yugoslavia) Nebojša Malbaša	18	Charleroi
(Brazil) Paulo da Silva Edmilson	15	Seraing
(Cameroon) Jean-Jacques Missé Missé	15	Charleroi
(Nigeria) Daniel Amokachi	14	Club Brugge
(Netherlands) Eric Viscaal	14	Gent

== Attendances ==
#	Club	Average
1	Anderlecht	18,265
2	Standard	12,959
3	Charleroi	10,500
4	Club Brugge	10,235
5	Lommel	8,029
6	Mechelen	8,006
7	Gent	7,829
8	Oostende	7,000
9	Seraing	6,441
10	Liège	6,424
11	Antwerp	6,353
12	Waregem	5,618
13	Lierse	5,559
14	Beveren	5,118
15	RWDM	5,059
16	Genk	4,912
17	Ekeren	4,012
18	Cercle	3,718
