= 1989–90 Belgian First Division =

87th season of top-tier football in Belgium

Belgian First Division
- Season: 1989–90

The 1989–90 edition of the Belgian League was the 87th since its establishment: Which played from September 1989 to May 1990 involved 18 teams, and Club Brugge K.V. won the championship, while K.S.K. Beveren and K.R.C. Mechelen were relegated.

Location of teams in Belgian First Division 1989–90

== League standings ==
Pos	Team	Pld	W	D	L	GF	GA	GD	Pts	Qualification or relegation
1	Club Brugge K.V.	34	25	7	2	76	19	+57	57	Qualified for 1990–91 European Cup
2	R.S.C. Anderlecht	34	24	5	5	76	21	+55	53	Qualified for 1990–91 UEFA Cup
3	KV Mechelen	34	19	12	3	65	14	+51	50	Qualified for 1990–91 UEFA Cup
4	Royal Antwerp FC	34	15	13	6	63	32	+31	43	Qualified for 1990–91 UEFA Cup
5	Standard Liège	34	16	10	8	54	33	+21	42	
6	K.A.A. Gent	34	12	12	10	46	38	+8	36	
7	K.V. Kortrijk	34	13	7	14	39	46	−7	33	
8	K. Beerschot V.A.C.	34	11	10	13	34	47	−13	32	
9	Cercle Brugge K.S.V.	34	12	7	15	46	47	−1	31	
10	Lierse S.K.	34	11	6	17	42	66	−24	28	
11	K.S.C. Lokeren Oost-Vlaanderen	34	9	10	15	34	66	−32	28	
12	R.F.C. de Liège	34	8	12	14	35	45	−10	28	Qualified for 1990–91 European Cup Winners' Cup
13	Germinal Ekeren	34	10	7	17	38	52	−14	27	
14	R. Charleroi S.C.	34	9	9	16	41	56	−15	27	
15	K. Sint-Truidense V.V.	34	8	11	15	25	45	−20	27	
16	K.S.V. Waregem	34	8	9	17	35	64	−29	25	
17	K.S.K. Beveren	34	8	8	18	31	57	−26	24	Relegated to Belgian Second Division
18	K.R.C. Mechelen	34	5	11	18	29	61	−32	21	Relegated to Belgian Second Division

== Results ==
Home \ Away	AND	ANT	BEE	BEV	CER	CLU	CHA	EKE	GNT	KOR	RCL	LIE	LOK	KVM	RCM	STV	STA	WAR
Anderlecht		0–1	2–0	1–0	4–0	0–0	5–0	2–0	0–1	3–0	4–2	2–1	7–0	0–3	1–0	3–0	1–0	6–0
Antwerp	2–2		4–0	0–0	1–1	0–4	3–0	4–1	2–2	2–0	1–1	4–1	5–0	1–1	1–0	2–0	2–1	4–0
Beerschot	1–3	1–1		4–1	0–0	0–0	2–0	1–0	2–0	0–2	1–0	0–0	2–3	0–0	2–1	0–0	0–3	2–0
Beveren	1–1	3–1	0–0		1–4	0–1	4–0	0–3	1–0	4–1	2–1	0–0	0–2	1–3	3–4	0–0	0–1	1–0
Cercle Brugge	1–2	2–0	0–2	0–1		0–2	3–3	1–1	1–0	1–2	1–0	1–2	3–1	0–0	4–1	2–1	3–1	3–1
Club Brugge	3–0	0–2	3–0	2–0	2–1		1–0	4–0	4–1	1–1	2–0	2–0	3–1	3–0	4–0	3–0	2–1	3–0
Charleroi	0–0	3–3	4–0	1–1	2–1	0–1		4–0	2–1	0–0	2–0	3–1	3–1	0–3	3–0	0–1	0–2	0–2
Germinal Ekeren	3–1	1–3	0–1	3–0	2–1	2–2	1–0		0–1	2–0	0–0	4–1	2–2	0–1	2–0	1–0	1–4	3–1
Gent	1–2	1–1	2–0	2–1	1–1	2–2	3–1	2–1		0–0	3–0	1–1	0–0	0–0	4–1	2–1	5–1	2–2
Kortrijk	0–2	0–6	3–1	4–0	0–3	0–3	3–2	3–1	1–0		1–0	5–0	0–1	0–0	6–2	2–1	0–1	1–2
Liège	0–1	1–1	3–1	3–2	0–0	0–0	0–1	2–0	2–2	3–1		4–2	4–0	0–0	0–0	2–0	0–0	2–0
Lierse	0–4	2–1	3–2	4–0	1–3	1–5	2–1	2–1	0–1	3–0	2–1		4–3	1–1	0–0	1–3	0–4	2–0
Lokeren	1–3	0–0	0–2	0–3	2–1	0–3	3–1	2–1	1–1	0–1	1–1	1–3		0–0	0–0	2–0	0–0	1–1
KV Mechelen	0–0	0–0	2–2	4–0	3–0	3–1	1–1	3–0	3–0	1–0	7–0	2–0	3–0		5–1	4–0	4–0	2–0
K.R.C. Mechelen	0–3	0–0	1–3	1–0	1–2	1–2	1–1	1–1	2–0	0–0	1–1	1–1	3–4	0–4		3–0	1–0	0–0
Sint-Truiden	0–4	1–0	1–1	1–1	1–0	1–4	0–0	0–0	2–1	1–1	1–1	2–0	0–1	1–0	0–0		1–1	1–1
Standard Liège	0–2	2–1	1–1	1–1	4–1	1–1	5–1	2–0	1–1	0–0	2–0	2–0	5–0	2–0	2–1	2–1		1–1
Waregem	0–5	1–4	4–0	4–0	2–1	1–3	2–2	1–1	0–2	0–1	3–1	2–1	1–1	0–2	2–1	0–3	1–1	

Legend: Blue = home team win; Yellow = draw; Red = away team win.

== Topscorers ==
Scorer	Goals	Team
(Australia) Frank Farina	24	Club Brugge
(Belgium) Marc Degryse	18	Anderlecht
(Netherlands) John Bosman	16	Mechelen
(Belgium) Nico Claesen	16	Royal Antwerp
(Belgium) Marc Van Der Linden	15	Royal Antwerp
(Belgium) Jan Ceulemans	15	Club Brugge
(Netherlands) Eric Viscaal	14	Lierse

== Attendances ==
No.	Club	Average attendance	Change	Highest
1	Anderlecht	17,912	18,9%	30,000
2	Club Brugge	14,882	28,8%	28,000
3	Standard	12,706	11,9%	25,000
4	Charleroi	10,294	-11,4%	21,000
5	KV Mechelen	9,447	-11,8%	12,500
6	Gent	8,441	44,7%	16,000
7	Liège	7,824	-27,1%	25,000
8	STVV	7,706	-18,6%	13,000
9	Antwerp	7,588	-13,9%	15,000
10	Kortrijk	6,435	-1,2%	12,000
11	Lierse	6,265	-18,4%	11,000
12	Beveren	5,829	1,6%	9,500
13	Cercle	5,618	34,5%	20,000
14	Beerschot	4,971	-8,2%	12,000
15	Lokeren	4,971	-5,6%	10,000
16	Ekeren	4,971	53,7%	9,000
17	Waregem	4,676	-4,2%	11,000
18	KRC Mechelen	3,512	-14,3%	8,500
