= 1997–98 Belgian First Division =

95th season of top-tier football in Belgium

Belgian First Division
- Season: 1997–1998
- Dates: 8 August 1997 - 10 May 1998
- Champions: Club Brugge
- Runner up: K.R.C. Genk
- Relegated: RWDM; Antwerp
- Champions League: Club Brugge
- Cup Winners' Cup: Racing Genk
- UEFA Cup: Beerschot AC; Anderlecht
- Intertoto Cup: RC Harelbeke; Lommel
- Matches: 306
- Goals: 904 (2.95 per match)
- Top goalscorer: Branko Strupar (22)

The 1997–98 season of the Jupiler League was held between 8 August 1997 and 10 May 1998. Club Brugge became champions.

== Promoted teams ==
Location of teams in Belgian First Division 1997–98

These teams were promoted from the second division at the start of the season:

- Beveren (second division champions)
- Westerlo (playoff winner)

== Relegated teams ==
These teams were relegated to the second division at the end of the season:

- RWDM
- Antwerp

== Brugge's title success ==
Club Brugge ended in first place 18 points ahead of Racing Genk.

== Battle for Europe ==
Sporting Anderlecht finally qualified for the UEFA Cup by ending in 4th place as Genk (2nd) and Brugge (1st) played the Cup final. The third team to qualify for the UEFA Cup was Germinal Ekeren (3rd).

== The relegation dog fight ==
RWDM was relegated following a 1-1 draw at Charleroi as the newcomer Beveren managed to draw against Germinal Ekeren on the 33rd matchday. With 4 points more than RWDM the club from Waasland then lost to Anderlecht on the last matchday whereas RWDM easily beat Lokeren by 5-1.

== Final league table ==
Pos	Team	Pld	W	D	L	GF	GA	GD	Pts	Qualification or relegation
1	Club Brugge	34	26	6	2	78	29	+49	84	Qualified for 1998–99 UEFA Champions League (Note: Club Brugge competed in the UEFA Cup after losing their Champions League Second Qualifying Round tie.)
2	K.R.C. Genk	34	20	6	8	65	40	+25	66	Qualified for 1998–99 UEFA Cup Winners' Cup
3	K.F.C. Germinal Beerschot	34	17	7	10	60	48	+12	58	Qualified for 1998–99 UEFA Cup
4	R.S.C. Anderlecht	34	16	9	9	53	37	+16	57	Qualified for 1998–99 UEFA Cup
5	Racing Club Harelbeke	34	15	10	9	50	31	+19	55	Qualified for 1998 UEFA Intertoto Cup
6	K.S.C. Lokeren Oost-Vlaanderen	34	16	4	14	68	68	0	52	
7	Lierse S.K.	34	14	8	12	54	45	+9	50	
8	K.A.A. Gent	34	11	14	9	50	44	+6	47	
9	Standard Liège	34	11	10	13	53	50	+3	43	
10	R.E. Mouscron	34	11	8	15	39	45	−6	41	
11	K.F.C. Lommel S.K.	34	10	11	13	46	50	−4	41	Qualified for 1998 UEFA Intertoto Cup
12	K.V.C. Westerlo	34	9	14	11	52	56	−4	41	
13	R. Charleroi S.C.	34	9	12	13	46	57	−11	39	
14	K. Sint-Truidense V.V.	34	8	13	13	32	45	−13	37	
15	K.S.C. Eendracht Aalst	34	9	9	16	51	66	−15	36	
16	K.S.K. Beveren	34	7	11	16	30	48	−18	32	
17	R.W.D. Molenbeek	34	8	7	19	39	74	−35	31	Relegated to Division II
18	R. Antwerp F.C.	34	6	7	21	38	71	−33	25	Relegated to Division II

== Results ==
Home \ Away	AAL	AND	ANT	BEV	CLU	CHA	EKE	GNK	GNT	HAR	LIE	LOK	LOM	MOL	MOU	STV	STA	WES
Eendracht Aalst		2–3	2–0	3–0	1–4	7–2	1–3	1–1	2–0	3–2	1–3	1–5	2–1	0–2	1–3	3–2	1–1	2–3
Anderlecht	3–1		2–2	2–0	0–1	3–1	4–0	0–2	2–2	1–0	2–0	5–0	2–0	0–2	1–2	1–0	2–0	1–0
Antwerp	1–1	0–1		1–0	0–1	2–4	3–2	2–1	0–0	0–2	3–2	1–2	2–1	1–0	1–2	0–4	3–5	0–0
Beveren	0–0	0–1	0–2		1–2	1–0	0–1	0–2	1–1	1–0	1–2	3–0	2–2	1–0	1–1	1–1	2–3	2–0
Club Brugge	4–1	2–1	3–2	3–1		3–2	1–3	2–0	2–1	2–1	2–1	5–0	2–0	4–1	1–0	6–0	0–0	3–1
Charleroi	1–1	3–0	2–1	0–0	2–2		3–2	1–2	1–1	3–3	3–0	2–0	1–2	1–1	3–0	0–0	2–1	1–1
Germinal Ekeren	2–3	1–0	2–0	1–1	2–2	5–0		4–3	1–3	0–2	1–1	4–2	1–0	3–1	2–2	1–0	0–3	1–0
Genk	3–2	2–1	1–1	3–0	3–0	4–0	4–2		2–1	1–0	1–3	1–0	3–0	3–0	0–2	0–0	1–1	5–5
Gent	0–0	1–1	0–0	3–2	0–4	3–1	0–2	1–2		0–0	1–0	1–1	2–0	3–4	0–0	1–1	4–1	6–0
Harelbeke	2–1	1–1	3–1	1–1	0–1	0–0	3–1	2–0	3–0		0–2	3–2	1–1	4–1	5–1	3–1	2–0	0–0
Lierse	1–1	0–1	2–1	2–0	2–4	1–1	1–1	1–2	1–2	1–1		3–0	1–4	1–1	2–0	1–0	3–1	3–1
Lokeren	4–1	2–1	5–0	1–2	1–1	3–2	1–3	1–5	3–2	1–0	4–2		2–1	5–0	2–1	0–2	1–3	3–0
Lommel	2–2	2–2	5–2	3–1	1–1	2–1	1–1	3–1	0–1	0–0	1–2	1–5		3–1	1–0	1–1	2–2	2–1
Molenbeek	1–1	2–2	2–0	1–1	0–2	1–2	0–4	1–1	0–2	0–1	0–3	5–1	1–2		2–1	2–0	1–4	1–2
Mouscron	2–0	2–2	2–0	1–1	0–1	0–0	0–1	0–2	1–1	1–0	2–0	1–3	2–1	4–0		1–3	3–2	0–2
Sint-Truiden	2–0	1–1	1–0	0–0	0–2	2–0	2–0	0–2	3–3	1–2	0–5	2–2	0–0	1–1	1–0		0–0	0–0
Standard Liège	3–0	1–2	2–2	1–2	0–3	2–0	0–2	3–0	3–3	0–1	0–0	1–3	1–0	4–0	1–1	2–0		2–2
Westerlo	0–3	2–2	5–2	3–0	2–2	1–1	1–1	0–2	0–1	2–2	1–1	3–3	1–1	5–1	2–1	4–1	2–0	

Legend: Blue = home team win; Yellow = draw; Red = away team win.

== Top goal scorers ==
Scorer	Goals	Team
(Croatia) Branko Strupar	22	Racing Genk
(Canada) Tomasz Radzinski	19	Germinal Ekeren
(Denmark) Peter Lässen	15	Eendracht Aalst
(Belgium) Gunther Hofmans	15	Germinal Ekeren
(Guinea) Souleymane Oularé	14	Racing Genk

== Attendances ==
No.	Club	Average attendance	Change	Highest
1	Anderlecht	21,353	10,3%	28,161
2	Club Brugge	12,706	-3,4%	16,000
3	Standard de Liège	12,088	-2,1%	20,000
4	Genk	10,629	20,1%	17,000
5	Lierse	8,118	-5,8%	14,000
6	Mouscron	7,476	-4,1%	9,000
7	STVV	7,382	-11,0%	13,500
8	Gent	7,294	-0,9%	16,000
9	Eendracht Aalst	6,982	4,5%	9,000
10	Lommel	6,529	-5,1%	12,500
11	Westerlo	6,312	109,2%	10,500
12	Charleroi	6,088	4,3%	14,000
13	Beveren	5,512	71,9%	9,000
14	Lokeren	5,265	-9,6%	13,000
15	Harelbeke	5,176	-3,3%	9,000
16	Germinal Beerschot	4,912	16,8%	8,000
17	Molenbeek	4,647	-15,1%	8,000
18	Antwerp	3,941	-38,5%	7,000

== See also ==
- 1997–98 in Belgian football
