= 1991–92 Belgian First Division =

89th season of top-tier football in Belgium

Belgian First Division
- Season: 1991–92

Club Brugge K.V. won the title of the 1991–92 season.

== Relegated teams ==
Location of teams in Belgian First Division 1991–92

These teams were relegated to the second division at the end of the season:

- K.V. Kortrijk
- Eendracht Aalst

== Final league table ==
Pos	Team	Pld	W	D	L	GF	GA	GD	Pts	Qualification or relegation
1	Club Brugge	34	21	11	2	68	29	+39	53	Qualified for 1992–93 UEFA Champions League
2	RSC Anderlecht	34	21	7	6	65	26	+39	49	Qualified for 1992–93 UEFA Cup
3	R. Standard de Liège	34	16	14	4	59	28	+31	46	Qualified for 1992–93 UEFA Cup
4	KV Mechelen	34	15	13	6	47	23	+24	43	Qualified for 1992–93 UEFA Cup
5	Antwerp FC	34	18	5	11	47	39	+8	41	Qualified for 1992–93 European Cup Winners' Cup
6	AA Gent	34	16	9	9	54	44	+10	41	
7	Lierse SK	34	14	9	11	53	50	+3	37	
8	Germinal Ekeren	34	13	11	10	55	45	+10	37	
9	Cercle Brugge	34	10	14	10	57	57	0	34	
10	KSV Waregem	34	11	8	15	47	55	−8	30	
11	RWDM	34	11	7	16	37	48	−11	29	
12	KSK Beveren	34	9	11	14	42	52	−10	29	
13	R. Charleroi SC	34	9	9	16	32	43	−11	27	
14	KSC Lokeren	34	8	11	15	38	51	−13	27	
15	Club Liégeois	34	7	13	14	33	47	−14	27	
16	KRC Genk	34	8	10	16	32	44	−12	26	
17	KV Kortrijk	34	5	10	19	31	72	−41	20	Relegated to Belgian Second Division
18	Eendracht Aalst	34	4	8	22	18	62	−44	16	Relegated to Belgian Second Division

== Results ==
Home \ Away	AAL	AND	ANT	BEV	CER	CLU	CHA	EKE	GNK	GNT	KOR	RCL	LIE	LOK	MEC	MOL	STA	WAR
Eendracht Aalst		0–4	0–3	0–0	0–1	0–1	2–0	0–1	1–0	1–3	0–1	0–2	0–0	2–3	1–1	1–0	1–1	0–4
Anderlecht	4–1		2–0	1–2	4–3	1–1	2–0	2–0	0–0	1–3	6–0	5–1	0–0	2–1	1–0	3–0	0–0	7–3
Antwerp	3–0	1–0		2–1	3–2	2–1	2–1	2–8	0–0	3–1	4–1	2–0	2–1	0–2	2–1	2–1	1–2	2–1
Beveren	1–1	0–1	1–1		5–1	0–0	0–0	4–1	0–3	3–1	3–0	0–4	3–2	2–3	3–1	1–1	1–1	1–1
Cercle Brugge	1–3	1–1	3–1	2–2		5–5	3–0	1–1	3–1	1–1	1–0	0–0	2–1	5–0	0–0	2–2	1–4	5–1
Club Brugge	2–0	2–0	0–0	3–1	1–1		1–1	0–0	3–0	5–1	6–2	4–0	4–1	3–1	3–2	3–1	0–0	2–1
Charleroi	4–0	0–0	0–1	1–0	1–0	1–2		3–1	3–0	0–1	3–1	1–1	0–0	1–1	1–2	2–0	0–2	1–2
Germinal Ekeren	2–0	0–4	1–0	0–0	1–0	0–1	2–2		1–1	3–0	3–0	0–0	4–2	3–1	0–1	0–0	2–2	1–1
Genk	0–0	2–0	0–2	1–0	0–2	0–0	3–0	0–4		0–1	3–0	0–0	1–2	5–0	0–1	4–1	0–3	1–0
Gent	1–0	1–3	1–0	4–0	2–2	1–1	0–0	1–0	2–0		2–2	3–1	1–1	0–0	1–1	3–2	1–0	3–0
Kortrijk	2–1	1–4	0–3	4–2	1–0	0–3	2–1	1–1	2–2	2–4		0–0	1–1	0–1	0–0	0–2	1–1	1–1
Liége	4–1	0–1	1–1	4–0	2–2	0–1	0–1	2–7	2–0	0–2	1–1		2–3	1–1	0–2	1–1	0–0	0–0
Lierse	6–0	0–1	0–1	3–2	2–0	3–2	3–0	5–1	2–1	1–0	2–1	1–0		2–1	0–3	3–1	1–1	0–0
Lokeren	1–1	0–1	2–0	0–1	2–2	2–3	2–2	1–2	0–0	1–1	3–1	0–0	2–0		1–4	1–2	1–1	3–0
Mechelen	2–0	0–0	0–0	3–1	6–0	0–0	2–0	1–1	0–0	2–1	1–0	5–1	0–0	1–1		3–0	0–1	0–0
Molenbeek	2–0	2–1	1–0	1–0	2–3	0–1	1–0	0–3	4–0	2–3	1–1	0–1	2–2	1–0	0–2		1–0	2–0
Standard Liège	0–0	1–2	2–0	0–0	0–0	1–2	4–1	4–1	3–2	4–2	2–0	1–0	8–2	1–0	0–0	1–1		6–3
Waregem	2–1	0–1	2–1	1–2	2–2	1–2	0–1	2–0	2–2	2–1	4–2	1–2	3–1	1–0	4–0	1–0	1–2	

Legend: Blue = home team win; Yellow = draw; Red = away team win.

== Top goal scorers ==
Scorer	Goals	Team
(Croatia) Josip Weber	26	Cercle Brugge
(Norway) Kjetil Rekdal	21	Lierse
(Netherlands) Foeke Booy	20	Club Brugge
(Belgium) Gunther Hofmans	18	Germinal Ekeren
(Belgium) Luc Nilis	16	Anderlecht
(Netherlands) John Bosman	16	Anderlecht
(Belgium) Alex Czerniatynski	16	Royal Antwerp
(Netherlands) Eric Viscaal	15	Gent

== Attendances ==
#	Club	Average
1	Anderlecht	17,412
2	Standard	15,706
3	Club Brugge	11,765
4	Charleroi	9,824
5	Mechelen	8,735
6	Gent	7,412
7	Genk	6,706
8	Liège	6,559
9	Lierse	6,059
10	RWDM	6,000
11	Beveren	5,859
12	Antwerp	5,606
13	Aalst	5,188
14	Lokeren	4,794
15	Cercle	4,647
16	Waregem	4,588
17	Kortrijk	4,529
18	Ekeren	4,376
