= Gabriel N'Galula =

Belgian footballer (born 1982)

Junior
Personal information
- Full name: Gabriel N'Galula Mbuyi
- Date of birth: 1 June 1982 (age 44)
- Place of birth: Kinshasa, Zaire
- Height: 1.82 m (6 ft 0 in)
- Position: Midfielder

Youth career
- 2000–2001: Anderlecht

Senior career*
| Years | Team | Apps | (Gls) |
| 2001–2006 | Anderlecht | 25 | (1) |
| 2004–2005 | → Mons (loan) | 15 | (0) |
| 2005–2006 | → Stoke City (loan) | 22 | (0) |
| 2006–2007 | Standard Liège | 0 | (0) |
| 2007–2008 | Roeselare | 5 | (0) |
| Total | | 67 | (1) |
- * Club domestic league appearances and goals

Gabriel N'Galula Mbuyi (born 1 June 1982), sometimes referred to as Junior, is a Belgian former professional footballer who played as a midfielder.

== Career ==
Junior began his career at Anderlecht where he showed promise in his 28 games, but a long injury saw him lose his place to Yves Vanderhaeghe and Besnik Hasi. In the 2004–05 season, he was loaned to Mons, where he played 15 times as Mons suffered relegation to the Second Division at the end of the season. He was loaned again to Stoke City in England for the 2005–06 season, where former Anderlect manager Johan Boskamp had been appointed manager. He played 24 matches for Stoke and left at the end of the season along with Boskamp.

Boskamp was made Standard Liège manager and he signed Junior on a permanent deal, as part of the Mohammed Tchité transfer to Anderlecht in the 2006–07 season. He played one match for Standard, in a UEFA Cup qualification match. He spent the 2007–08 season with Roeselare, before deciding to retire from professional football and pursue a different career.

In 2013, he began working at BX Brussels as a sporting director.

== Personal life ==
His brother Floribert N'Galula was also a professional footballer.

== Career statistics ==
Appearances and goals by club, season and competition
| Club | Season | League | | | National cup | | League cup | | Europe | | Total | |
| Club | Season | Division | Apps | Goals | Apps | Goals | Apps | Goals | Apps | Goals | Apps | Goals |
|---|---|---|---|---|---|---|---|---|---|---|---|---|
| Anderlecht | 2001–02 | Belgian First Division | 12 | 0 | | | | | – | | 12 | 0 |
| Anderlecht | 2002–03 | Belgian First Division | 4 | 1 | | | | | – | | 4 | 1 |
| Anderlecht | 2003–04 | Belgian First Division | 3 | 0 | | | | | – | | 3 | 0 |
| Anderlecht | 2004–05 | Belgian First Division | 6 | 0 | | | | | – | | 6 | 0 |
| Anderlecht | Total | | 25 | 1 | | | | | 0 | 0 | 25 | 1 |
| Mons (loan) | 2004–05 | Belgian First Division | 15 | 0 | | | | | – | | 15 | 0 |
| Stoke City (loan) | 2005–06 | Championship | 22 | 0 | 2 | 0 | 0 | 0 | – | | 24 | 0 |
| Standard Liège | 2006–07 | Belgian First Division | 0 | 0 | | | | | 1 | 0 | 1 | 0 |
| Roeselare | 2007–08 | Belgian First Division | 5 | 0 | | | | | – | | 5 | 0 |
| Career total | | | 67 | 0 | 2 | 0 | 0 | 0 | 1 | 0 | 70 | 1 |
