= 2005–06 Stoke City F.C. season =

Stoke City
2005–06 season
- Chairman: Gunnar Gíslason
- Manager: Johan Boskamp
- Stadium: Britannia Stadium
- Championship: 13th (58 Points)
- FA Cup: Fifth Round
- League Cup: First Round
- Top goalscorer: League: Paul Gallagher (11); All: Paul Gallagher (12)
- Highest home attendance: 20,408 vs Leeds United (28 December 2005)
- Lowest home attendance: 10,121 vs Crystal Palace (13 March 2006)
- Average home league attendance: 14,738
Home colours

The 2005–06 season was Stoke City's 99th season in the Football League, and the 39th in the second tier.

In June 2005 Tony Pulis was sacked by Stoke's Icelandic board and Dutch manager Johan Boskamp was appointed. He went about changing Stoke's style of play to a more European passing style which also meant a decent number of foreign players were signed by the club. The change in style had mixed success whilst Stoke did play good attacking football the defensive qualities by Pulis's side went missing and Stoke suffered some poor defeats particularly at home. Stoke were far too inconsistent to be anything other than a mid-table side and they finished in 13th position. At the end of the season Boskamp left the club and Icelandic chairman Gunnar Gíslason put the club up for sale. Former chairman Peter Coates bought the club back and re-appointed Tony Pulis as manager.

== Season review ==
=== League ===
On 28 June 2005 manager Tony Pulis was sacked by Gunnar Gíslason for "failing to exploit the foreign transfer market". The next day Dutch manager Johan Boskamp was named as Pulis' successor. Boskamp went about changing Stoke's style of play to be more attacking and possession based during pre-season and he brought in a number of foreign players. Most came from the Belgian Pro League and mainly his old club Anderlecht. In came Carl Hoefkens, Hannes Sigurðsson, Junior N'Galula and Martin Kolář whilst Marlon Broomes, Paul Gallagher Mamady Sidibé, Peter Sweeney and Luke Chadwick the domestic based players to join the club.

The first match of the 2005–06 season saw City come up against newly promoted Sheffield Wednesday and Stoke struggled to a goalless draw after Gerry Taggart had been sent-off after just 10 minutes. In the next match Stoke lost 4–2 away at Leicester City to set the defensive tone for the season. The club record fee was broken with the £950,000 signing of Sambégou Bangoura on transfer deadline day but three bad home defeats by Watford, Wolverhampton Wanderers and Cardiff City saw supporters begin to ask questions. Bangoura then went on a good run of form scoring seven goals in six matches as Stoke won six matches in November and December to give them a platform to build on going into the new year. But in one of those wins away at Coventry City Boskamp and his assistant Jan de Koning and director of football John Rudge were involved in an argument which led to Boskamp almost resigning.

Stoke began 2006 in terrible form winning just one match in ten and scoring a mere six goals in that time. Bangoura had been away on international duty with Guinea and failed to return to the club at the agreed date which caused the shortage of goals and with Stoke's season fizzling out with no chance of promotion Boskamp was not offered a new contract by Gunnar Gíslason. Stoke ended the season with an emphatic 5–1 win at relegated Brighton & Hove Albion and young striker Adam Rooney scored a hat-trick becoming Stoke's youngest scorer of a hat-trick.

With the Icelandic board failing to gain promotion to the Premier League and with debts now at around £5million chairman Gunnar Gíslason put the club up for sale and he sold the club back to former chairman Peter Coates. Coates then re-appointed Tony Pulis as manager who had spent the season with Plymouth Argyle.

=== FA Cup ===
Stoke had three ties against Birmingham opposition in this seasons FA Cup firstly beating plucky non-league Tamworth on penalties in a replay and then a 2–1 win against Walsall before losing 1–0 to Birmingham City.

=== League Cup ===
Stoke continued their poor showing against lower league sides in the first round this time losing 3–0 on penalties to Mansfield Town.

== Final league table ==
Pos	Team	Pld	W	D	L	GF	GA	GD	Pts
11	Cardiff City	46	16	12	18	58	59	−1	60
12	Southampton	46	13	19	14	49	50	−1	58
13	Stoke City	46	17	7	22	54	63	−9	58
14	Plymouth Argyle	46	13	17	16	39	46	−7	56
15	Ipswich Town	46	14	14	18	53	66	−13	56

Updated to match(es) played on 2 December 2011. Source: RSSSF
Rules for classification: 1) points; 2) goal difference; 3) number of goals scored.

== Results ==
Stoke City's score comes first

=== Legend ===
Win	Draw	Loss

=== Pre-season friendlies ===
Match	Date	Opponent	Venue	Result	Scorers
1	10 July 2005	Newcastle Town	A	7–0	Sidibé (2), Taggart, Russell, Neal, Paterson (2)
2	13 July 2005	Chester City	A	1–1	Sidibé
3	16 July 2005	Shrewsbury Town	A	0–1	
4	20 July 2005	VfL Osnabrück	A	4–2	Russell, Guðjónsson, Duberry, Paterson
5	25 July 2005	Hannover 96	A	0–1	
6	28 July 2005	Stockport County	A	1–2	Dyer
7	31 July 2005	Manchester City	H	1–2	Dyer

=== Football League Championship ===
Match	Date	Opponent	Venue	Result	Attendance	Scorers	Report
1	6 August 2005	Sheffield Wednesday	H	0–0	18,744		Report
2	9 August 2005	Leicester City	A	2–4	20,519	Broomes 64', Halls 89'	Report
3	13 August 2005	Millwall	A	1–0	8,668	Halls 38'	Report
4	20 August 2005	Luton Town	H	2–1	18,653	Broomes 63', Brammer 90+2'	Report
5	27 August 2005	Crystal Palace	A	0–2	17,637		Report
6	29 August 2005	Norwich City	H	3–1	14,249	Kolář 9', Harper 45', Sidibé 69'	Report
7	10 September 2005	Watford	H	0–3	14,565		Report
8	13 September 2005	Hull City	A	1–0	18,692	Gallagher 74'	Report
9	16 September 2005	Preston North End	A	1–0	12,453	Gallagher 76'	Report
10	24 September 2005	Wolverhampton Wanderers	H	1–3	18,181	Buxton 90+1'	Report
11	27 September 2005	Cardiff City	H	0–3	12,240		Report
12	1 October 2005	Plymouth Argyle	A	1–2	12,604	Chadwick 47'	Report
13	15 October 2005	Derby County	A	1–2	22,229	Hoefkens 59'	Report
14	18 October 2005	Crewe Alexandra	H	2–0	14,080	Bangoura 41', Duberry 64'	Report
15	22 October 2005	Reading	H	0–1	13,484		Report
16	29 October 2005	Southampton	A	0–2	24,095		Report
17	2 November 2005	Coventry City	A	2–1	16,617	Taggart 37', Gallagher 55'	Report
18	5 November 2005	Brighton & Hove Albion	H	3–0	15,274	Bangoura (2) 35', 75', Russell 68'	Report
19	19 November 2005	Crewe Alexandra	A	2–1	8,942	Bangoura 16', Gallagher 89'	Report
20	22 November 2005	Derby County	H	1–2	13,205	Bangoura 33'	Report
21	26 November 2005	Sheffield Wednesday	A	2–0	21,970	Bangoura 17', Sidibé 86'	Report
22	3 December 2005	Queens Park Rangers	H	1–2	15,367	Bangoura 26'	Report
23	9 December 2005	Leicester City	H	3–2	11,125	Gallagher 36' (pen), Sidibé 75', Bangoura 78'	Report
24	17 December 2005	Luton Town	A	3–2	8,296	Gallagher (2) 45+1', 83', Coyne 90+3', (o.g.)	Report
25	26 December 2005	Burnley	A	0–1	17,912		Report
26	28 December 2005	Leeds United	H	0–1	20,408		Report
27	31 December 2005	Sheffield United	A	1–2	21,279	Sidibé 57'	Report
28	2 January 2006	Ipswich Town	H	2–2	14,493	Russell 27', Sidibé 73'	Report
29	14 January 2006	Watford	A	0–1	12,247		Report
30	21 January 2006	Hull City	H	0–3	13,444		Report
31	4 February 2006	Preston North End	H	0–0	13,218		Report
32	11 February 2006	Cardiff City	A	0–3	10,780		Report
33	14 February 2006	Plymouth Argyle	H	0–0	10,242		Report
34	25 February 2006	Millwall	H	2–1	11,340	Hoefkens 15' (pen), Gallagher 57'	Report
35	4 March 2006	Norwich City	A	1–2	24,223	Gallagher 58'	Report
36	7 March 2006	Wolverhampton Wanderers	A	0–0	22,439		Report
37	13 March 2006	Crystal Palace	H	1–3	10,121	Skoko 47'	Report
38	18 March 2006	Burnley	H	1–0	12,082	Gallagher 52'	Report
39	25 March 2006	Leeds United	A	0–0	21,452		Report
40	29 March 2006	Queens Park Rangers	A	2–1	10,918	Hoefkens 73' (pen), Sigurðsson 79'	Report
41	1 April 2006	Sheffield United	H	1–1	17,544	Skoko 16'	Report
42	8 April 2006	Ipswich Town	A	4–1	23,592	Wilnis 51' (o.g.), Bangoura 82', Chadwick 90', Russell 90+4'	Report
43	15 April 2006	Southampton	H	1–2	16,501	Gallagher 83'	Report
44	17 April 2006	Reading	A	1–3	22,119	Rooney 59'	Report
45	22 April 2006	Coventry City	H	0–1	13,385		Report
46	30 April 2006	Brighton & Hove Albion	A	5–1	5,859	Rooney (3) 6', 22', 63', Sidibé 40', Sweeney 82'	Report

=== FA Cup ===
Round	Date	Opponent	Venue	Result	Attendance	Scorers	Report
R3	7 January 2006	Tamworth	H	0–0	9,366		Report
R3 Replay	17 January 2006	Tamworth	A	1–1 (5–4 pens)	3,812	Gallagher 80'	Report
R4	28 January 2006	Walsall	H	2–1	8,834	Sidibé 45', Chadwick 49'	Report
R5	19 February 2006	Birmingham City	H	0–1	18,768		Report

=== League Cup ===
Round	Date	Opponent	Venue	Result	Attendance	Scorers	Report
R1	23 August 2005	Mansfield Town	A	1–1 (0–3 pens)	2,799	Brammer 11' (pen)	Report

== Squad statistics ==
No.	Pos.	Name	League		FA Cup		League Cup		Total		Discipline	
No.	Pos.	Name	Apps	Goals	Apps	Goals	Apps	Goals	Apps	Goals	Yellow card	Red card
1	GK	(England) Steve Simonsen	45	0	4	0	1	0	50	0	2	1
2	DF	(Belgium) Carl Hoefkens	44	3	4	0	1	0	49	3	6	0
3	DF	(England) Marlon Broomes	36(1)	2	4	0	1	0	41(1)	2	7	1
4	MF	(England) John Eustace	0	0	0	0	0	0	0	0	0	0
5	DF	(England) Michael Duberry	41	1	3	0	1	0	45	1	6	1
6	DF	(England) Clint Hill	12(1)	0	1	0	0	0	13(1)	0	0	0
7	FW	(Guinea) Sambégou Bangoura	23(1)	9	1	0	0	0	24(1)	9	6	0
8	MF	(England) Dave Brammer	38(2)	1	4	0	1	1	43(2)	2	7	0
9	FW	(Mali) Mamady Sidibé	37(5)	6	4	1	1	0	42(5)	7	3	0
10	FW	(Iceland) Hannes Sigurðsson	10(13)	1	0(3)	0	0	0	10(16)	1	1	0
11	MF	(Scotland) Kevin Harper	5(9)	1	1(1)	0	1	0	7(10)	1	2	0
12	MF	(Scotland) Peter Sweeney	8(9)	1	2(1)	0	0	0	10(10)	1	1	0
14	MF	(Iceland) Þórður Guðjónsson	0	0	0	0	0(1)	0	0(1)	0	0	0
15	GK	(Netherlands) Ed de Goey	1(1)	0	0(1)	0	0	0	1(2)	0	0	0
16	FW	(England) Bruce Dyer	2(9)	0	0	0	1	0	3(9)	0	1	0
17	MF	(England) Darel Russell	35(2)	3	1	0	0(1)	0	36(3)	3	7	1
18	MF	(Belgium) Junior N'Galula	16(6)	0	1(1)	0	0	0	17(7)	0	2	1
19	MF	(England) Luke Chadwick	33(3)	2	4	1	0	0	37(3)	3	5	0
20	MF	(Czech Republic) Martin Kolář	12(2)	1	0	0	1	0	13(2)	1	1	0
20	MF	(Australia) Josip Skoko	9	2	0	0	0	0	9	2	1	0
21	MF	(England) John Halls	13	2	0	0	1	0	14	2	2	1
22	DF	(England) Lewis Buxton	25(7)	1	3	0	0(1)	0	28(8)	1	6	0
23	MF	(England) Karl Henry	11(13)	0	3	0	1	0	15(13)	0	2	0
24	FW	(Scotland) Paul Gallagher	32(5)	11	3	1	0	0	35(5)	12	10	0
25	MF	(Finland) Peter Kopteff	3(3)	0	1(2)	0	0	0	4(5)	0	0	0
26	MF	(Wales) Anthony Pulis	0	0	0	0	0	0	0	0	0	0
28	DF	(England) Andy Wilkinson	4(2)	0	0	0	0	0	4(2)	0	1	0
30	FW	(Northern Ireland) Martin Paterson	2(1)	0	0	0	0	0	2(1)	0	0	0
31	DF	(England) Carl Dickinson	4(1)	0	0	0	0	0	4(1)	0	0	0
32	DF	(Northern Ireland) Gerry Taggart	3	1	0	0	0	0	3	1	0	1
33	GK	(Republic of Ireland) Robert Duggan	0	0	0	0	0	0	0	0	0	0
34	FW	(Republic of Ireland) Adam Rooney	2(3)	4	0(2)	0	0	0	2(5)	4	1	0
35	MF	(Northern Ireland) Robert Garrett	0(2)	0	0	0	0	0	0(2)	0	0	0
36	MF	(Northern Ireland) Matthew Hazley	0(1)	0	0	0	0	0	0(1)	0	0	0
–	–	Own goals	–	2	–	0	–	0	–	2	–	–
