= Mamady Sidibé =

Malian footballer (born 1979)

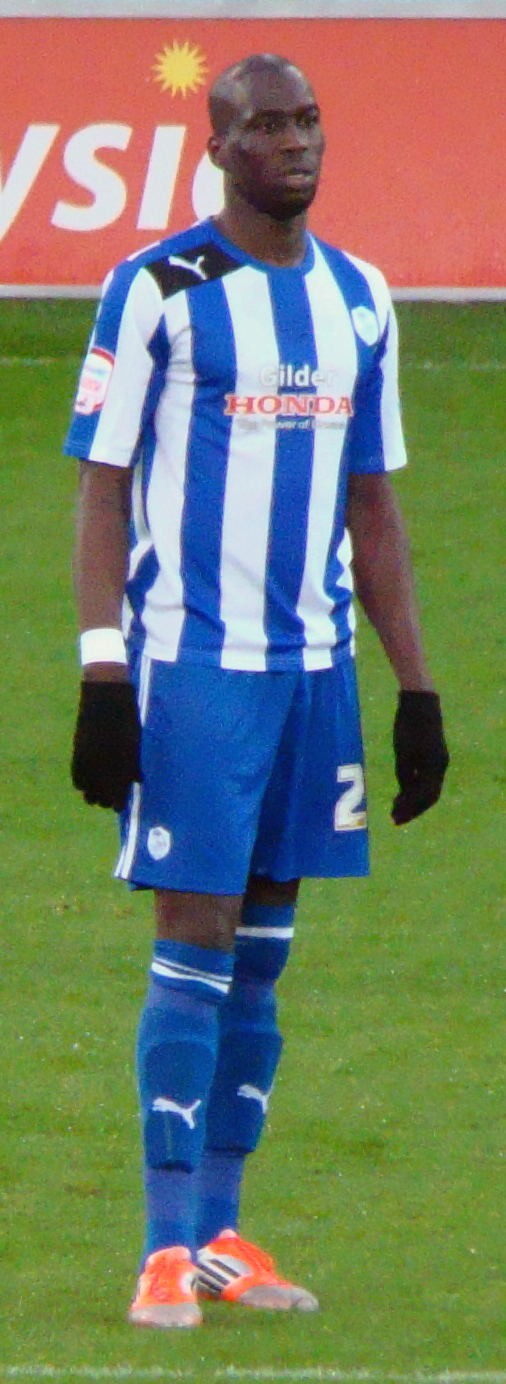
- Sidibé playing for Sheffield Wednesday in 2012

Personal information
- Full name: Mamady Sidibé
- Date of birth: 18 December 1979 (age 46)
- Place of birth: Kremis, Mali
- Height: 1.93 m (6 ft 4 in)
- Position: Forward

Youth career
- 1995–1997: Bagneux
- 1997–1998: Massy Palaiseau

Senior career*
Years	Team	Apps	(Gls)
1998–2000	Red Star 93		
2000–2001	CA Paris-Charenton		
2001–2002	Swansea City	31	(7)
2002–2005	Gillingham	106	(10)
2005–2013	Stoke City	168	(24)
2012–2013	→ Sheffield Wednesday (loan)	9	(1)
2013	→ Tranmere Rovers (loan)	10	(0)
2013	CSKA Sofia	11	(1)
Total		335	(43)

International career
2002–2008	Mali	14	(0)
- * Club domestic league appearances and goals

Mamady Sidibé (born 18 December 1979) is a Malian former professional footballer who played as a forward.

Sidibé moved from his native Mali to France when he was two years old. After playing football for a number of lower French league sides he joined Swansea City in 2001. He spent a single season at the Welsh club before signing for Gillingham. After three and a half years in Kent Sidibé rejected an offer of a new contract and joined Stoke City in July 2005 on a free transfer.

He went on to become a key member of Tony Pulis's first team and helped the club gain promotion to the Premier League in 2008. His career at Stoke was disrupted from 2010 by a serious Achilles tendon injury, which recurred after his return and was then compounded by a knee dislocation, in total keeping him out of first-team football for more than two years. After his return, Sidibé spent time out on loan at Sheffield Wednesday and Tranmere Rovers before his contract at Stoke ended in May 2013. He then briefly joined Bulgarian side CSKA Sofia, before retiring from professional football in 2015.

== Club career ==
=== Early life in France ===
Sidibé was born in Kremis, Kayes Region in Mali before his family migrated to France when he was two years old. He lived in Pantin before moving to Bagneux, Hauts-de-Seine where he joined the local under thirteen football team. At the age of 15 he joined Massy Palaiseau, a youth team in the 91st district where he played for a whole season as a defender. He impressed watching scouts and was signed by local team Red Star 93 where he played along with Fousseni Diawara, Samba Diawara, Diomansy Kamara and Abdoulaye Méïté. On the last day of the 1999–2000 season, the coach decided to play him as a striker and he scored his first goal of the season while playing what was his last game for Red Star. The following season, he joined CA Paris-Charenton as a result of Red Star's financial demise which led to the club almost filing for bankruptcy. He left for the United Kingdom when he was 21 years old to join Swansea City.

=== Swansea City ===
Sidibé was signed by Swansea City on 25 August 2001 after a successful trial. He scored on his League debut for The Swans in a 3–1 win over Macclesfield Town on the opening day of the 2001–02 season. He continued his impressive form and produced a man of the match display against Queens Park Rangers in the FA Cup. This prompted interest from other clubs. He held talks with Barnsley over a £200,000 transfer in December. However, he could not agree personal terms.

After picking up an ankle injury in December Sidibé returned to France however he failed to return on the agreed date and was disciplined by the club. He returned to the club in February 2002 and was offered a new contract which Sidibé rejected.

=== Gillingham ===
In August 2002 he joined Gillingham, for whom he scored 13 goals in 115 matches. When Gillingham were relegated at the end of the 2004–05 season, Sidibé declined the offer of a new contract.

=== Stoke City ===
Sidibé joined Stoke City on a two-year contract on a free transfer in June 2005. Tony Pulis, who brought Sidibé to Stoke, was sacked just four days later. He performed as a lone striker for the early stages of the 2005–06 season, keeping Bruce Dyer on the bench. Eventually, new Stoke manager Johan Boskamp signed Sambégou Bangoura to play alongside him in attack. He scored his first goal for City in a 3–1 win against Norwich City in August 2005. However, he did not score again for another 15 games.

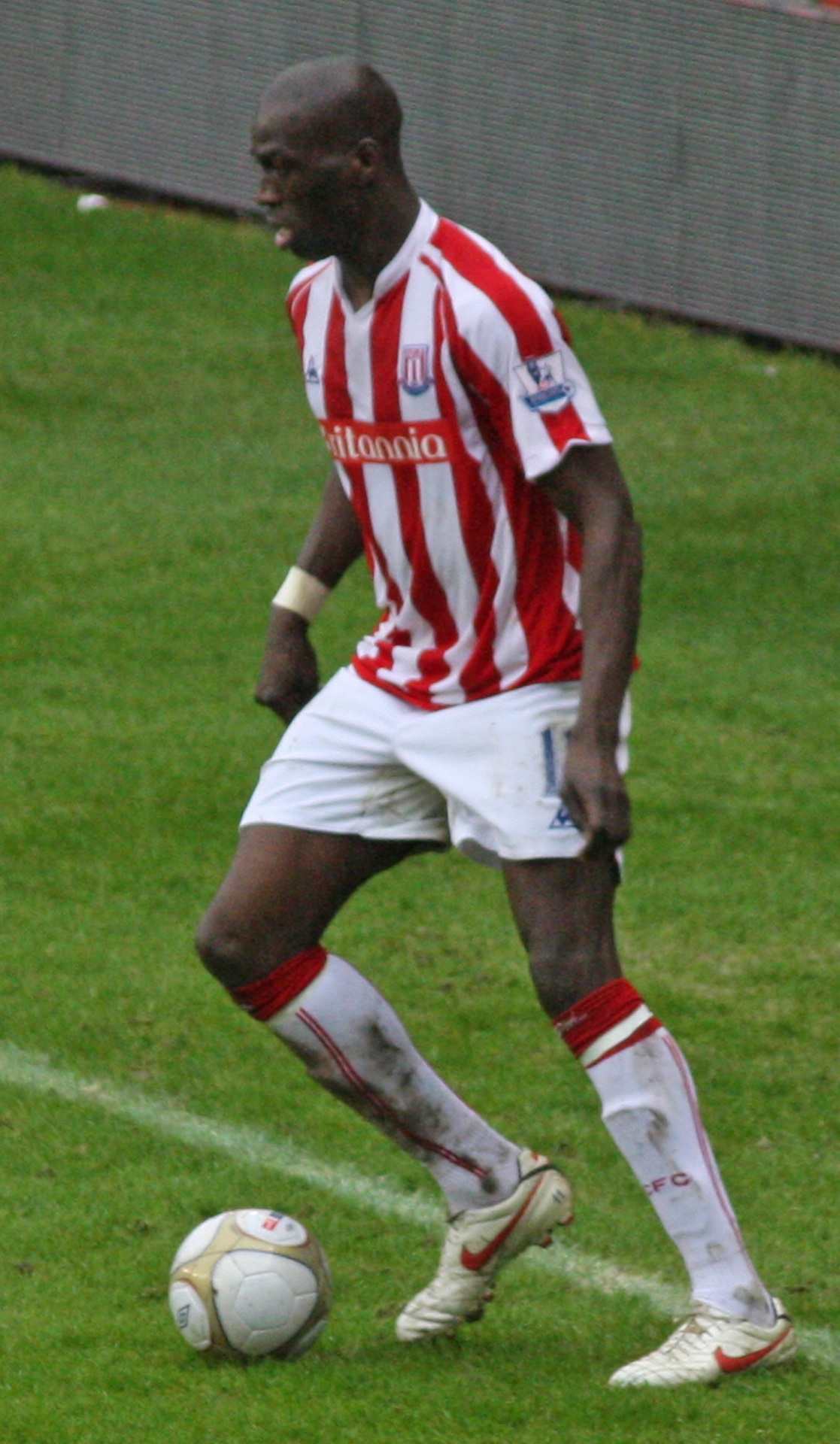
Sidibé in action at the Britannia Stadium for Stoke City.

He went on to make 47 appearances during the 2005–06 season scoring seven goals. Sidibé was more prolific during the 2006–07 season scoring nine goals as Stoke narrowly missed out on a play-off place.

Sidibé made 33 appearances for Stoke City in the 2007–08 season, scoring four goals including a vital brace against Bristol City as Stoke were promoted to the Premier League. On 23 August 2008, Sidibé scored the third goal in Stoke City's 3–2 home win against Aston Villa, when Rory Delap's long throw was headed home by Sidibé. This was Stoke's first ever win in the Premier League. Sidibé has since gone on to score his second Premier League goal of his career and season against West Bromwich Albion in a 1–0 win against their fellow newly promoted rivals. On 6 December, Sidibé netted his third goal at Newcastle United, to start the fightback from Stoke losing 2–0 to eventually draw 2–2, putting them 13th place in the league. On 12 December, Sidibé suffered a knee injury whilst playing for Stoke City against Fulham at the Britannia Stadium. The injury kept Sidibé out for two months but he injured the same knee again during the warm up for a reserve game against Aston Villa Reserves. It was revealed that he needed surgery.

Sidibé made his return from injury coming on as a second-half substitute in a 2–2 draw with Wolverhampton Wanderers. The decision by the management to rush Sidibé back from injury has come under heavy criticism from supporters. Sidibé thought he scored in a 1–0 defeat at Aston Villa however referee Lee Probert deemed it to be a foul on Stephen Warnock. He made his 150th appearance for City against Fulham on 6 January 2010 when he scored the third goal in a 3–2 win for Stoke. Sidibé signed a new contract at Stoke in February 2010, extending his stay at the Britannia Stadium until June 2012.

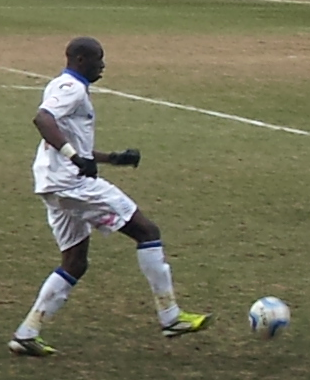
Sidibé playing on loan for Tranmere Rovers.

Sidibé snapped his achilles tendon against Tottenham Hotspur which ruled him out the rest of 2010. He returned to first team training in January 2011. He marked his return to the side by scoring in a reserve game against Burton Albion on 8 February. However two days later in a training session Sidibé again snapped his Achilles tendon ending his season. Sidibé admitted he broke down in tears when he snapped his right Achilles tendon for a second time in six months.

After 14 months out Sidibé made his comeback from his injury in a reserve match against Nottingham Forest. However, in his next reserve match against Port Vale Sidibé suffered more injury woe as he was carried off in the second half with a dislocated knee. After suffering his third serious injury in two years Sidibé admitted that he had considered retiring from football. On 22 November 2012 Sidibé joined Sheffield Wednesday on a months loan. His loan spell at Hillsborough was extended until 19 January 2013. He scored his first goal for the "Owls" in a 1–0 win away at Bolton Wanderers. In February 2013 Sidibé joined League One side Tranmere Rovers on loan until the end of the 2012–13 season. His loan spell at Prenton Park was cut short due to an abductor injury. He left Stoke at the end of the 2012–13 season after scoring 26 goals in 186 appearances for the club in an eight-year spell.

=== CSKA Sofia ===
On 29 July 2013 Sidibé joined Scottish League One side Rangers on trial. He then joined Bulgarian side CSKA Sofia on trial. On 28 August 2013, Sidibé signed a one-year contract with CSKA Sofia. He made his league debut on 13 September, in a 1–0 away win against Pirin Gotse Delchev, playing the full 90 minutes. Four days later, Sidibé scored his first goal in Bulgaria, netting fifth in a 6–2 home win over Haskovo in the Bulgarian Cup. Sidibé had a difficult time settling in Bulgaria and was released from the club in December 2013.

=== Later career ===
Sidibe had a trial at Southend United in October 2014. He retired from professional football in February 2015 due to family and business commitments, and began playing Sunday League football.

== International career ==
Sidibé played at international level for Mali. He was first called up to the national team shortly after his debut for Gillingham, featuring in two unofficial friendlies in the south of France against Istres and Monaco, scoring against the latter.

His first official cap came in a qualifier for the African Cup of Nations against the Seychelles in 2002. He was part of Mali's squads for the 2004 and 2008 African Cup of Nations, but made only one substitute appearance in each tournament.

In October 2007 he was stabbed by a spectator during an international match with Togo and suffered what was described as a "horrific injury".

== Personal life ==
Sidibé has a younger brother, Lassana, who in 2009 signed for Dover Athletic, who were managed by the elder Sidibé's former Gillingham teammate Andy Hessenthaler. In July 2009, Lassana played a pre-season friendly for Stoke's rivals Port Vale, in an attempt to follow Mamady into the Football League. However Lassana was not offered a contract and returned to Dover. His cousin Moussa Sidibé is also a footballer.

Sidibé's son Sol was born in 2007 and signed a professional contract with Stoke in July 2023, before moving to PSV Eindhoven in 2025 to play for their reserve side, Jong PSV.

Despite growing up in Paris Sidibé supported their great rivals Marseille. He released his autobiography in 2013 entitled The Luckiest Man in Football. On 12 July 2014, Sidibe and his wife, Bineta, opened a pâtisserie in the Potteries Shopping Centre called Melice.

== Career statistics ==
=== Club ===
Appearances and goals by club, season and competition
Club	Season	League			Cup		League Cup		Other		Total	
Club	Season	Division	Apps	Goals	Apps	Goals	Apps	Goals	Apps	Goals	Apps	Goals
Swansea City	2001–02	Third Division	31	7	2	1	1	0	1 (Note: Appearances in Football League Trophy)	0	35	8
Gillingham	2002–03	First Division	30	3	3	1	1	0	—		34	4
Gillingham	2003–04	First Division	41	5	1	1	3	0	—		45	6
Gillingham	2004–05	Championship	35	2	0	0	1	1	—		36	3
Gillingham	Total		106	10	4	2	5	1	0	0	115	13
Stoke City	2005–06	Championship	42	6	4	1	1	0	—		47	7
Stoke City	2006–07	Championship	43	9	2	0	1	0	—		46	9
Stoke City	2007–08	Championship	35	4	1	0	1	0	—		37	4
Stoke City	2008–09	Premier League	22	3	0	0	2	1	—		24	4
Stoke City	2009–10	Premier League	24	2	5	0	1	0	—		30	2
Stoke City	2010–11	Premier League	2	0	0	0	0	0	—		2	0
Stoke City	2011–12	Premier League	0	0	0	0	0	0	—		0	0
Stoke City	2012–13	Premier League	0	0	0	0	0	0	—		0	0
Stoke City	Total		168	24	12	1	6	1	0	0	186	26
Sheffield Wednesday (loan)	2012–13	Championship	9	1	1	0	0	0	—		10	1
Tranmere Rovers (loan)	2012–13	League One	10	0	0	0	0	0	—		10	0
CSKA Sofia	2013–14	A PFG	11	1	4	1	—		—		15	2
Career total			335	43	23	5	12	2	1	0	371	50

=== International ===
Appearances and goals by national team and year
National team	Year	Apps	Goals
Mali	2002	1	0
Mali	2003	4	0
Mali	2004	2	0
Mali	2005	1	0
Mali	2006	2	0
Mali	2007	1	0
Mali	2008	3	0
Total		14	0

== Honours ==
Stoke City

- Football League Championship runner-up: 2007–08
