= Carl Hoefkens =

Belgian footballer (born 1978)

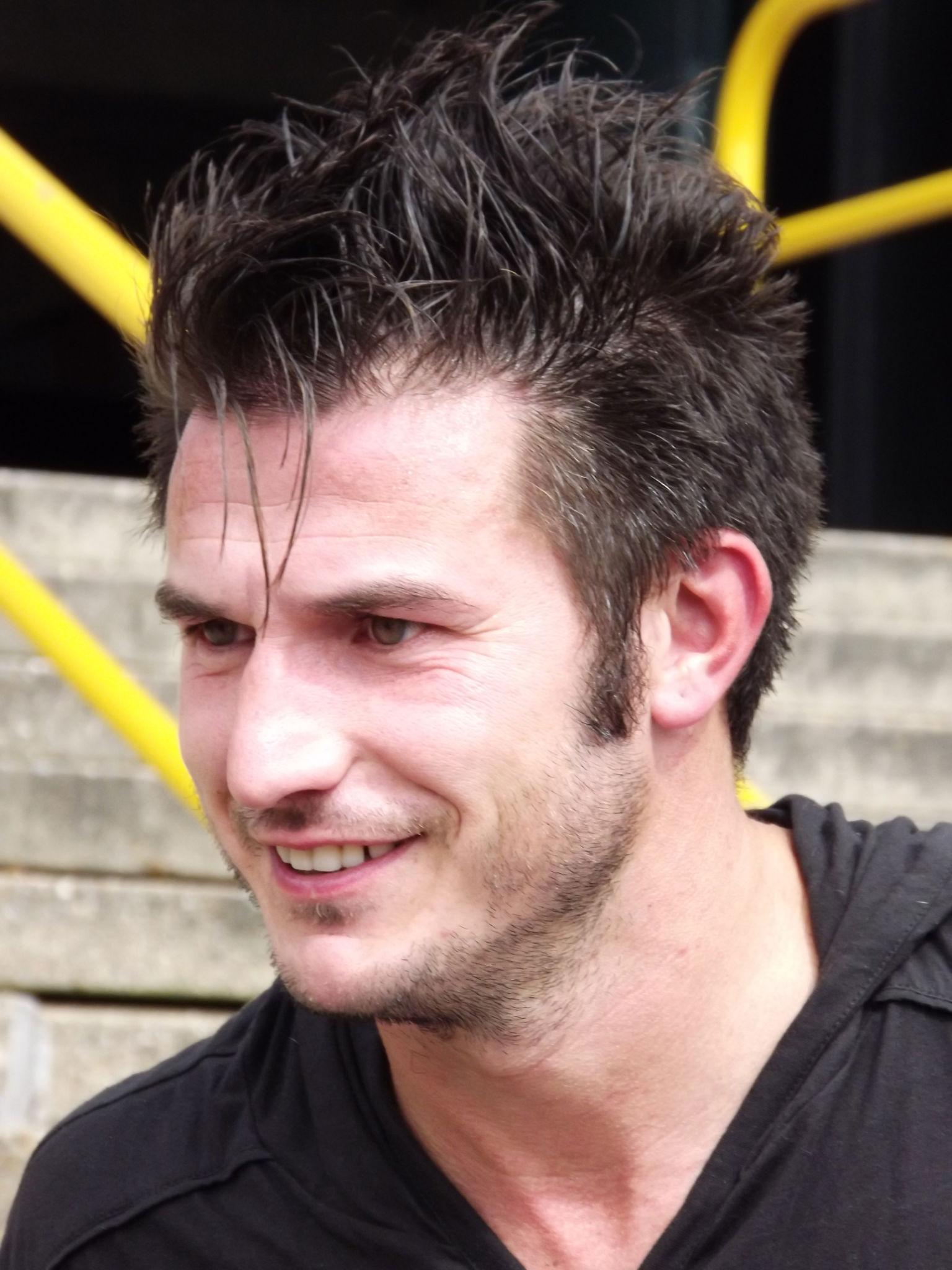
- Hoefkens in 2012

Personal information
- Full name: Carl Hoefkens
- Date of birth: 6 October 1978 (age 48)
- Place of birth: Lier, Belgium
- Height: 1.85 m (6 ft 1 in)
- Position: Defender

Senior career*
Years	Team	Apps	(Gls)
1996–2001	Lierse	129	(1)
2001–2003	Lommel	54	(4)
2003	Westerlo	7	(0)
2003–2005	Germinal Beerschot	62	(2)
2005–2007	Stoke City	89	(5)
2007–2009	West Bromwich Albion	52	(0)
2009–2013	Club Brugge	127	(4)
2013–2014	Lierse	20	(0)
2014–2015	Oostende	18	(1)
2015–2016	Manchester 62	19	(2)
Total		577	(19)

International career
1992–1993	Belgium U15	2	(0)
1994–1995	Belgium U16	6	(1)
1994–1995	Belgium U17	6	(1)
1995–2000	Belgium U18	20	(1)
1995–1996	Belgium U19	7	(0)
1997	Belgium U20	4	(0)
1997–1999	Belgium U21	16	(2)
1999–2008	Belgium	22	(1)

Managerial career
- 2018: Knokke (scout)
- 2018–2019: Club Brugge (youth)
- 2019–2022: Club Brugge (staff)
- 2022: Club Brugge
- 2023: Standard Liège
- 2024–2026: NAC Breda
- * Club domestic league appearances and goals

Carl Hoefkens (born 6 October 1978) is a Belgian football manager and former professional footballer who played as a defender.

== Club career ==
=== Early career ===
Born in Lier, Hoefkens started his career at Lierse and played there for six years. He made his breakthrough with Lierse in first division and won the Belgian Cup in 1999, beating Standard Liège in the final with 3–1. Afterwards, he made a move to Lommel but Lommel went bankrupt in 2003. In the summer of 2003, he came to Germinal Beerschot, a first division team in Antwerp. There, he became one of the pillars of the team. In his second season at Germinal Beerschot, he won the cup in the final against Club Brugge, then champions of Belgium. Hoefkens is still appreciated by Beerschot fans; a group of fans from the club have travelled to England on numerous occasions to watch him play.

=== Stoke City ===
In July 2005, Stoke City manager Johan Boskamp signed Hoefkens on a two-year contract, for an undisclosed fee. He made his debut for the club in a 0–0 draw against Sheffield Wednesday on 6 August 2005. Hoefkens became an ever-present in the Stoke line-up and wore the number 2 shirt. He was named 'Fans' Player of the year (2005–06).

During the January 2007 transfer window, he was linked with a return to Belgium, with Club Brugge reportedly interested in him. He was also penalty taker for Stoke before the arrival of Danny Higginbotham; however, he still maintained a 100% record for the club. In the 2006–07 season, he operated as a winger or a central midfielder on occasions in the latter stages of the season.

=== West Bromwich Albion ===
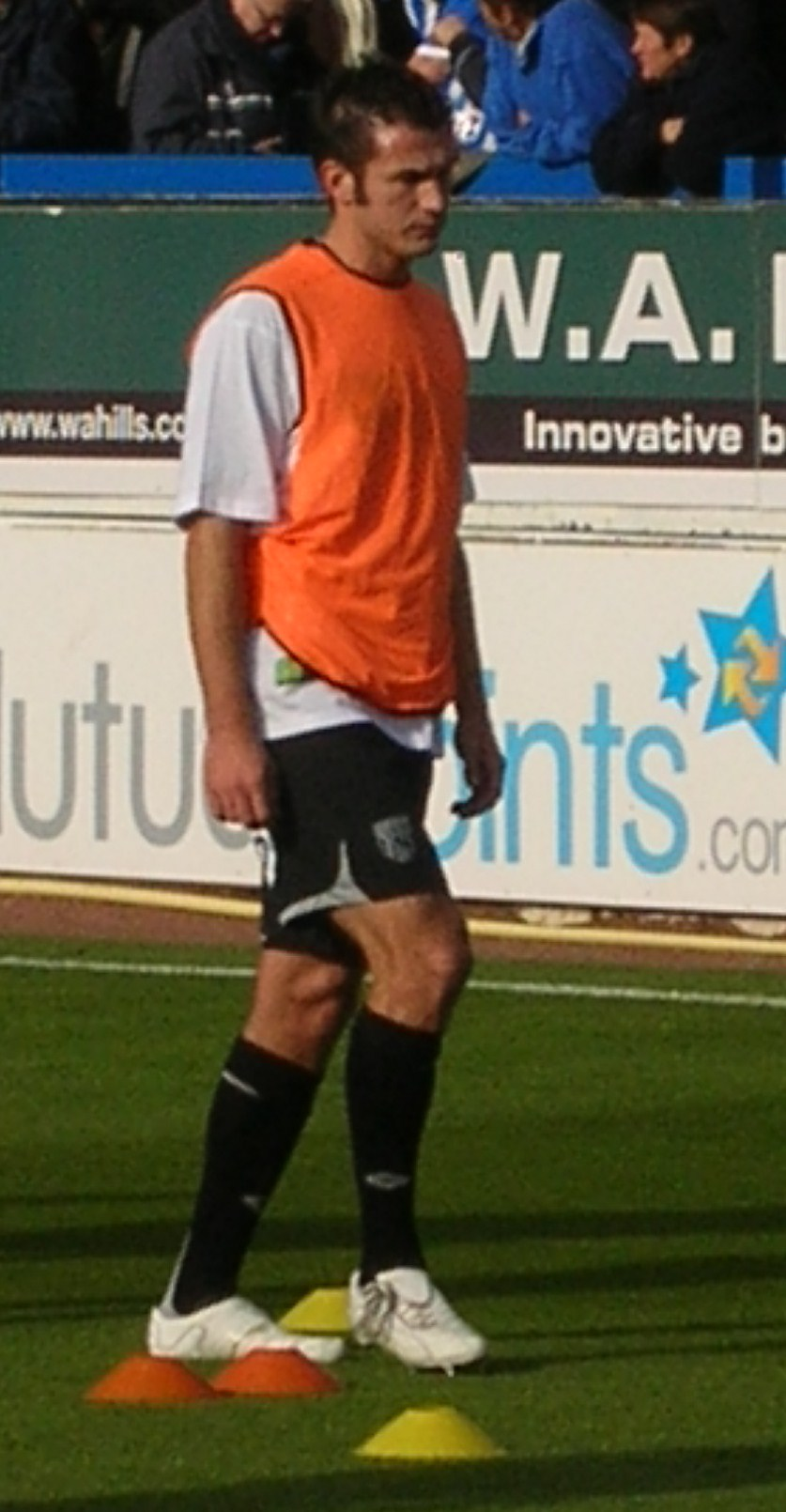
Hoefkens with West Bromwich Albion in 2007

Stoke accepted a bid for Hoefkens from West Bromwich Albion on 4 August 2007. He joined Albion on 7 August 2007 in a £750,000 deal and was offered a two-year contract plus a further one-year as an option. Hoefkens made his Albion debut in a 2–1 defeat away at Burnley on the opening day of the 2007–08 season. One week later, Hoefkens was named in the Championship Team of the Week, following his performance in the 2–0 home win over Preston North End. He is known by his West Brom teammates as "Wolverine", due to his resemblance to the comic book hero from X-Men.

Hoefkens was released in the summer of 2009.

=== Return to Belgium ===
On 25 August 2009, Club Brugge signed the former West Bromwich Albion's Belgian right-back on a two-year deal. He became captain in the season 2010–11. After the season ended, he signed for an extra year with the club. After four years and 127 appearances for the club, Hoefkens moved to Lierse in 2013, spending a season there before a move to Oostende.

=== Gibraltar and retirement ===
In August 2015, after his release from Oostende, Hoefkens signed for Gibraltar Premier Division side Manchester 62, who beat off competition from reigning champions Lincoln Red Imps for his signature. He signed undisclosed semi-professional terms for the side and aided in the development of David Ochello's young side, making his debut on 26 September in a 1–0 victory over Glacis United. After 19 league games and two goals, as the Red Devils of Gibraltar finished sixth in the league, he retired at the end of the 2015–16 season.

== International career ==
Hoefkens played 22 times for the Belgium national team, scoring once. He also represented Belgium in the 1997 FIFA World Youth Championship.

Hoefkens' one international goal came on 24 May 2006, in a friendly with Turkey in Genk. His last-minute goal secured a 3–3 draw. It was feared that Hoefkens had broken a bone in his foot in a Euro 2008 qualifier against Portugal in March 2007, however a scan revealed that there was no damage.

== Coaching and later career ==
At the end of January 2018, Hoefkens was hired as a scout for Knokke.

On 28 May 2018, it was confirmed that Hoefkens would return to Club Brugge from the upcoming season, where he would function as assistant coach and talent coach for the U21 and U18 teams. In June 2019, Hoefkens was placed in a new role as a part of the first team staff, where he would have the specific task of guiding young talents and provide the link between the academy and the first team. In May 2022, Hoefkens took over as head coach of Club Brugge, signing a contract with indefinite duration. In the 2022–23 UEFA Champions League, he led Club Brugge to the knockout phase for the first time in the Champions League era. On 28 December 2022, Club Brugge announced the termination of his contract.

Hoefkens was named as manager of Standard Liège on 16 June 2023, on a three-year deal. He replaced Ronny Deila, who went to Brugge. Hoefkens named Yaya Touré as part of his coaching staff. Later that year, on 31 December, he was dismissed by the club due to disappointing results.

Hoefkens was then announced as NAC Breda manager on the 6 June 2024 for the 2024–25 season in the Eredivisie, which was NAC's first season in the division since 2018–19. Despite the club getting relegated at the end of the 2025–26 season, Hoefkens remained in charge. He was dismissed on 7 September 2026, following a mediocre start to the 2026–27 Eerste Divisie season.

== Personal life ==
Hoefkens married model Vanessa D'Hooghe in 2001.

== Career statistics ==
=== Club ===
Appearances and goals by club, season and competition
Club	Season	League			National cup		League cup		Total	
Club	Season	Division	Apps	Goals	Apps	Goals	Apps	Goals	Apps	Goals
Lierse	1996–97	Belgian First Division	17	0			—		17	0
Lierse	1997–98	Belgian First Division	27	1			—		27	1
Lierse	1998–99	Belgian First Division	30	0			—		30	0
Lierse	1999–2000	Belgian First Division	28	0			—		28	0
Lierse	2000–01	Belgian First Division	27	0			—		27	0
Lierse	Total		129	1			—		129	1
Lommel	2001–02	Belgian First Division	33	3			—		33	3
Lommel	2002–03	Belgian First Division	21	1			—		21	1
Lommel	Total		54	4			—		54	4
Westerlo	2002–03	Belgian First Division	7	0			—		7	0
Germinal Beerschot	2003–04	Belgian First Division	32	4			—		32	4
Germinal Beerschot	2004–05	Belgian First Division	30	3			—		30	3
Germinal Beerschot	Total		62	7			—		62	7
Stoke City	2005–06	Championship	44	3	4	0	1	0	49	3
Stoke City	2006–07	Championship	45	2	2	0	0	0	47	2
Stoke City	Total		89	5	6	0	1	0	96	5
West Bromwich Albion	2007–08	Championship	42	0	5	0	0	0	47	0
West Bromwich Albion	2008–09	Premier League	10	0	4	0	1	0	15	0
West Bromwich Albion	Total		52	0	9	0	1	0	62	0
Club Brugge	2009–10	Belgian Pro League	31	0	3	0	—		34	0
Club Brugge	2010–11	Belgian Pro League	38	2	2	0	—		40	2
Club Brugge	2011–12	Belgian Pro League	34	2	1	0	—		35	2
Club Brugge	2012–13	Belgian Pro League	24	0	1	0	—		25	2
Club Brugge	Total		127	4	7	0	—		134	4
Lierse	2013–14	Belgian Pro League	20	0	2	0	—		22	0
Oostende	2014–15	Belgian Pro League	18	1	0	0	—		18	1
Career total			558	22	24	0	2	0	584	22

=== International ===
Appearances and goals by national team and year
National team	Year	Apps	Goals
Belgium	1999	4	0
Belgium	2005	3	0
Belgium	2006	8	1
Belgium	2007	5	0
Belgium	2008	2	0
Total		22	1

Score and result list Belgium's goal tally first, score column indicates score after Hoefkens goal.

International goal scored by Carl Hoefkens
No.	Date	Venue	Opponent	Score	Result	Competition
1	24 May 2006	Cristal Arena, Genk, Belgium	Turkey	3–3	3–3	Friendly

=== Manager ===
As of 4 September 2026

Managerial record by team and tenure
Team	Nat.	From	To	Record							
Team	Nat.	From	To	G	W	D	L	GF	GA	GD	Win %
Club Brugge	(Belgium)	1 July 2022	28 December 2022	27	15	6	6	46	29	+17	55.56
Standard Liège	(Belgium)	1 July 2023	31 December 2023	22	6	8	8	24	31	−7	27.27
NAC Breda	(Netherlands)	6 June 2024	7 September 2026	75	16	21	38	80	133	−53	21.33
Career total				124	37	35	52	150	193	−43	29.84

== Honours ==
=== Player ===
Lierse

- Belgian First Division A: 1996–97
- Belgian Cup: 1998–99
- Belgian Super Cup: 1997, 1999

Beerschot A.C.

- Belgian Cup: 2004–05

West Bromwich Albion

- Football League Championship: 2007–08

Individual

- Stoke City Player of the Year: 2006

=== Manager ===
Club Brugge

- Belgian Super Cup: 2022
