= Johan Boskamp =

Dutch footballer and manager

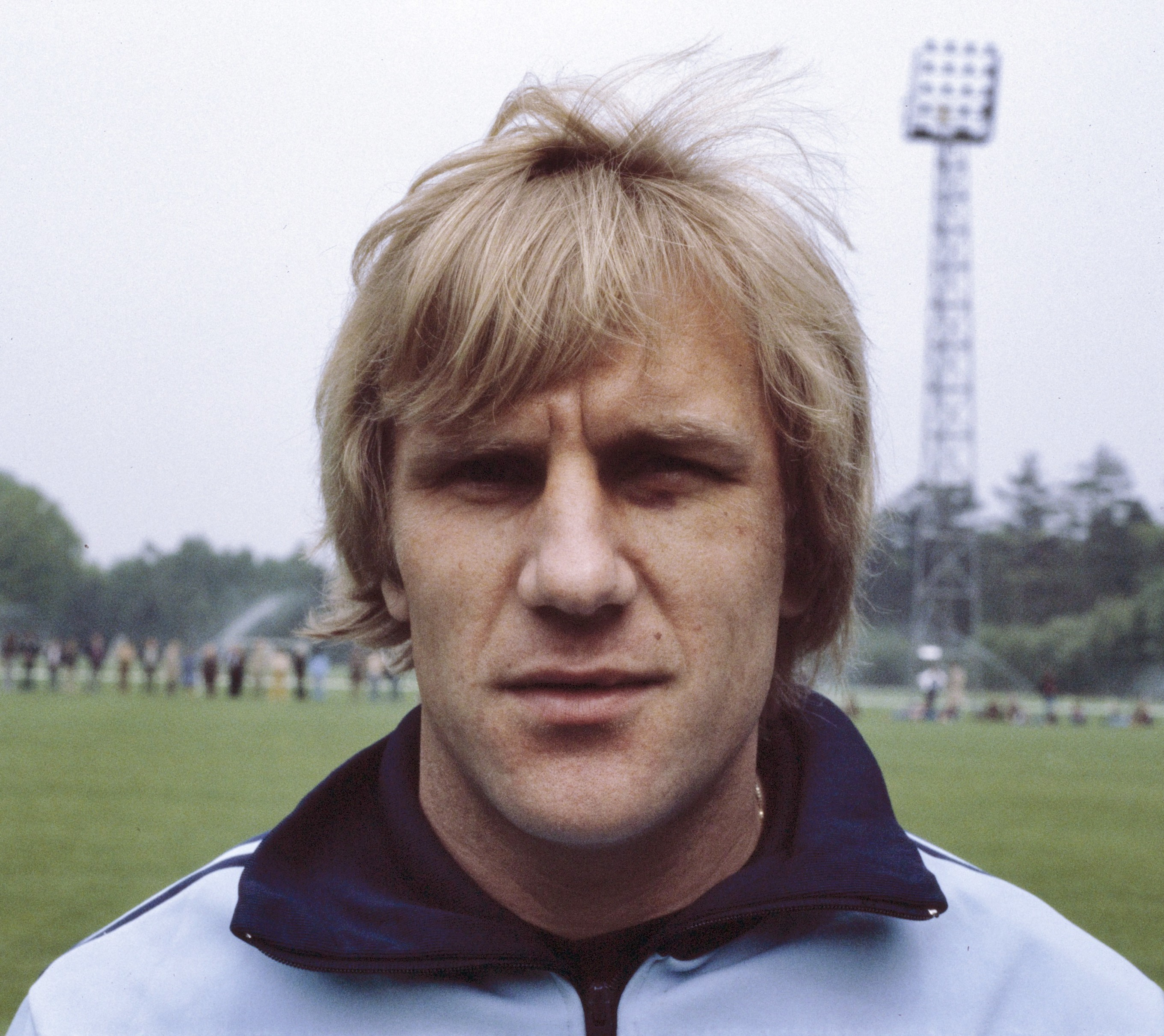
- Boskamp in 1978

Personal information
- Full name: Johannes Boskamp
- Date of birth: 21 October 1948 (age 78)
- Place of birth: Rotterdam, Netherlands
- Height: 1.78 m (5 ft 10 in)
- Position: Midfielder

Youth career
- 1955–1965: RVV HOV
- 1965–1966: Feyenoord

Senior career*
| Years | Team | Apps | (Gls) |
| 1966–1974 | Feyenoord | 102 | (14) |
| 1969–1970 | → Holland Sport (loan) | 31 | (7) |
| 1974–1982 | RWD Molenbeek | 238 | (36) |
| 1982–1984 | Lierse | 60 | (3) |
| Total | | 431 | (60) |

International career
| 1978 | Netherlands | 2 | (0) |

Managerial career
- 1981: RWDM
- 1984–1987: Lierse
- 1988–1989: Verbr. Denderhoutem
- 1989–1992: Beveren
- 1992–1993: Kortrijk
- 1993–1997: Anderlecht
- 1997–1998: Gent
- 1999: Dinamo Tbilisi
- 1999: Georgia
- 2000–2001: Genk
- 2001–2002: Al Wasl
- 2004–2005: Kazma
- 2005–2006: Stoke City
- 2006: Standard Liège
- 2007–2009: Dender
- 2009: Beveren
Medal record
Representing Netherlands
FIFA World Cup
| Runner-up | 1978 Argentina |
- * Club domestic league appearances and goals

Johannes "Johan/Jan" Boskamp (born 21 October 1948) is a Dutch former football player and manager.

He played the majority of his career for hometown club Feyenoord and Belgian side RWDM, and managed primarily in the Belgian leagues. Currently, he is a regular sports commentator on two Dutch and Belgian football television programs. He is commonly addressed as "Jan" in the Netherlands and "Johan" in Belgium.

== Playing career ==
=== Club ===
His former clubs as a player include RVV HOV, Feyenoord, Holland Sport, RWD Molenbeek (with whom he won the Belgian First Division in 1975) and Lierse. He also won the 1970 Intercontinental Cup with Feyenoord.

Boskamp was voted Belgian Golden Shoe winner in 1975.

=== International ===
He was part of the Dutch team for the 1978 FIFA World Cup, making one substitute appearance against Scotland.

== Coaching career ==
Later, Boskamp became a manager, and coached Belgian clubs Lierse, Dender, Beveren, Kortrijk, Anderlecht and Gent. He then moved to Georgia in 1999 to manage Dinamo Tbilisi, as well as the Georgia national team. After a return to Belgium with Genk, he moved to the Middle East and managed the United Arab Emirates side Al Wasl, and the Kuwaiti club Kazma.

He became manager of English side Stoke City for the 2005–06 season. Stoke's Icelandic board wanted the club to start mounting a serious attempt at gaining promotion to the Premier League, and so decided a change in style was required, with Boskamp replacing Tony Pulis. He brought in a number of foreign players, which included Carl Hoefkens, Hannes Sigurðsson, Junior N'Galula and Martin Kolář, as well as domestically-based players such as Marlon Broomes, Paul Gallagher, Mamady Sidibe, Peter Sweeney and Luke Chadwick. He also broke the club record transfer fee with a £950,000 signing of Standard Liège striker Sambégou Bangoura. However, results were often poor, and after a number of heavy home defeats to Watford, Wolverhampton Wanderers and Cardiff City, supporters began asking questions. Bangoura then went on a good run of form scoring seven goals in six matches, as Stoke won six matches in November and December to give them a platform to build on going into the new year. But, in one of those wins away at Coventry City, Boskamp and his assistant Jan de Koning and director of football John Rudge were involved in an argument, which led to Boskamp almost resigning.

Stoke began 2006 in terrible form, winning just one match in ten, and scoring a mere six goals in that time. Bangoura had been away on international duty with Guinea, and failed to return to the club at the agreed date, which caused the shortage of goals; with Stoke's season fizzling out, with no chance of promotion, Boskamp was not offered a new contract by Gunnar Gíslason. With the Icelandic board failing to gain promotion to the Premier League, and with debts now at around £5 million, chairman Gunnar Gíslason put the club up for sale, and he sold the club back to former chairman Peter Coates. Coates then re-appointed Tony Pulis as manager, who had spent the season with Plymouth Argyle.

Boskamp was then briefly manager at Standard Liège in 2006. In November 2007, he became coach of another Belgian club: Dender. On 19 May 2009, he quit Dender after an argument with his coaching assistant Patrick Asselman, who was subsequently named as his replacement.

In June 2009, Boskamp signed with Beveren, but was sacked in December 2009 after poor results.

In June 2024, Boskamp put an end to his career as an analyst and Standaard Uitgeverij published in collaboration with Boskamp's partner the autobiography Boskamp - Mijn leven (Boskamp - My Life).

== Career statistics ==
=== Club ===
Appearances and goals by club, season and competition
| Club | Season | League | | |
| Club | Season | Division | Apps | Goals |
|---|---|---|---|---|
| Feyenoord | 1966–67 | Eredivisie | 1 | 0 |
| Feyenoord | 1967–68 | Eredivisie | 15 | 2 |
| Feyenoord | 1968–69 | Eredivisie | 10 | 0 |
| Feyenoord | 1969–70 | Eredivisie | 0 | 0 |
| Feyenoord | 1970–71 | Eredivisie | 22 | 2 |
| Feyenoord | 1971–72 | Eredivisie | 21 | 4 |
| Feyenoord | 1972–73 | Eredivisie | 5 | 1 |
| Feyenoord | 1973–74 | Eredivisie | 28 | 5 |
| Feyenoord | Total | | 102 | 14 |
| Holland Sport (loan) | 1969–70 | Eredivisie | 31 | 7 |
| RWD Molenbeek | 1974–75 | Belgian First Division | 33 | 5 |
| RWD Molenbeek | 1975–76 | Belgian First Division | 32 | 6 |
| RWD Molenbeek | 1976–77 | Belgian First Division | 28 | 4 |
| RWD Molenbeek | 1977–78 | Belgian First Division | 30 | 7 |
| RWD Molenbeek | 1978–79 | Belgian First Division | 32 | 6 |
| RWD Molenbeek | 1979–80 | Belgian First Division | 28 | 2 |
| RWD Molenbeek | 1980–81 | Belgian First Division | 26 | 3 |
| RWD Molenbeek | 1981–82 | Belgian First Division | 29 | 3 |
| RWD Molenbeek | Total | | 238 | 36 |
| Lierse | 1982–83 | Belgian First Division | 29 | 2 |
| Lierse | 1983–84 | Belgian First Division | 31 | 1 |
| Lierse | Total | | 60 | 3 |
| Career total | | | 431 | 60 |

=== International ===
| National team | Year | Apps | Goals |
|---|---|---|---|
| Netherlands | 1978 | 2 | 0 |
| Total | | 2 | 0 |

== Managerial statistics ==
Managerial record by team and tenure
| Team | From | To | Record | | | | |
| Team | From | To | P | W | D | L | Win % |
|---|---|---|---|---|---|---|---|
| Stoke City | 29 June 2005 | 1 May 2006 | 51 | 18 | 10 | 23 | 35.3 |

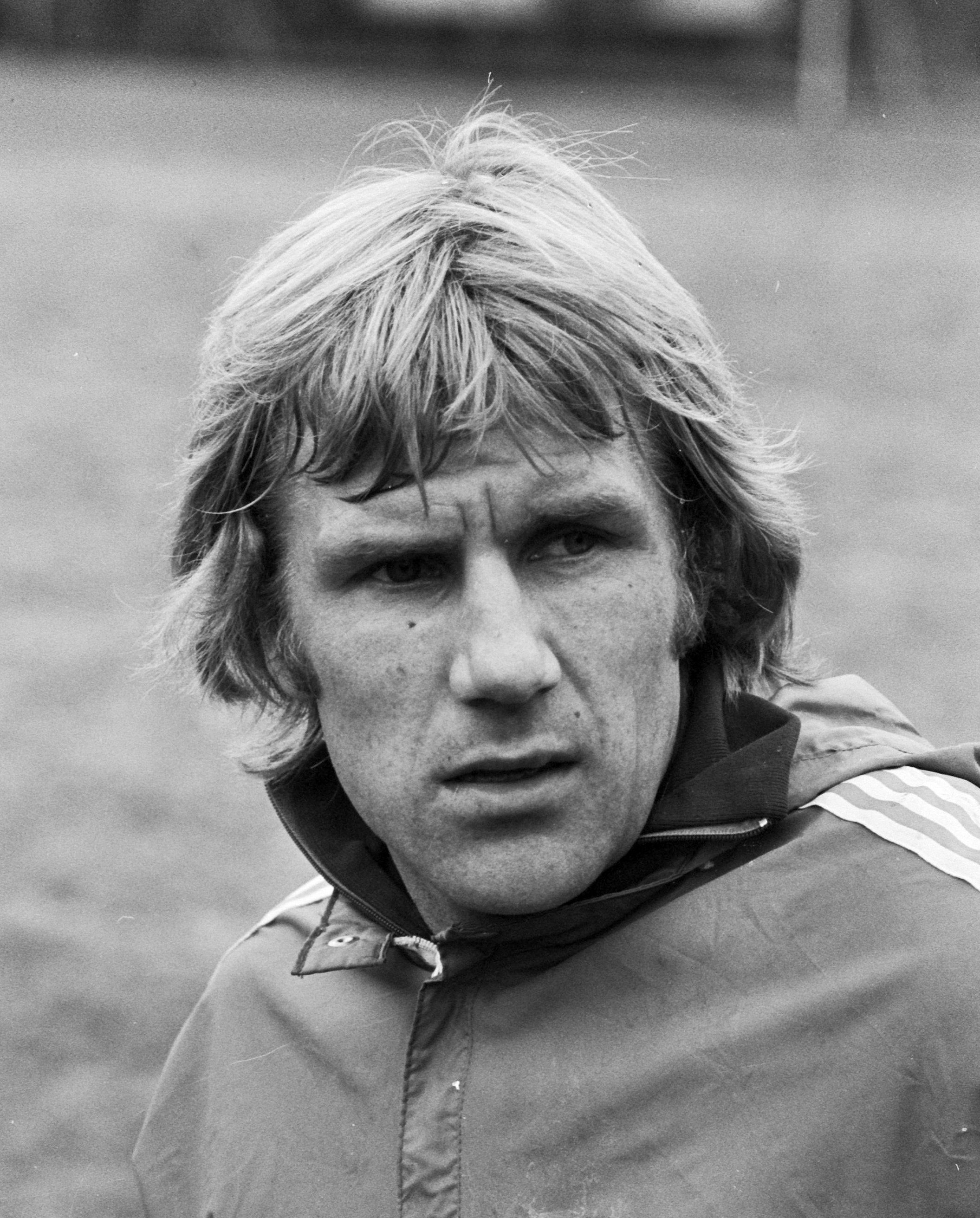
Johan Boskamp in 1977

== Honours ==
=== Player ===
Feyenoord

- Eredivisie: 1968–69, 1970–71, 1973–74
- KNVB Cup: 1968-69
- Intercontinental Cup: 1970
- UEFA Cup: 1974
- Intertoto Cup: 1967, 1968, 1973

RWD Molenbeek

- Belgian First Division: 1974–75
- Jules Pappaert Cup: 1975
- Amsterdam Tournament: 1975

=== International ===
==== Netherlands ====
- FIFA World Cup: 1978 (runners-up)

=== Individual ===
- Man of the Season (Belgian First Division): 1974-75, 1977-78
- Belgian Golden Shoe: 1975

=== Manager ===
SK Beveren

- Second Division: 1990-91

RSC Anderlecht

- Belgian First Division: 1992–93, 1993–94, 1994–95

Dinamo Tbilisi

- Umaglesi Liga: 1998–99

Racing Genk

- Belgian Cup: 1999–2000
