= 2006–07 Stoke City F.C. season =

Stoke City
2006–07 season
- Chairman: Peter Coates
- Manager: Tony Pulis
- Stadium: Britannia Stadium
- Championship: 8th (73 Points)
- FA Cup: Fourth Round
- League Cup: First Round
- Top goalscorer: League: Ricardo Fuller (10); All: Ricardo Fuller (11)
- Highest home attendance: 23,017 vs Southend United (3 February 2007)
- Lowest home attendance: 11,626 vs Plymouth Argyle (26 August 2006)
- Average home league attendance: 15,749
Home colours	Away colours

The 2006–07 season was Stoke City's 100th in the Football League, and the 40th in the second tier.

With the return of Peter Coates and Tony Pulis the objective was to now gain a return to the top flight of English football. Pulis was not a popular choice of manager amongst Stoke supporters and that feeling failed to be improved after a poor start to the season. But Coates provided Pulis with funds to spend on Danny Higginbotham, Ricardo Fuller and several high-profile loan arrivals including Lee Hendrie, Liam Lawrence, Rory Delap, Salif Diao, Andy Griffin and Patrik Berger. Stoke marked a turn around in the direction of the club with a 4–0 win away at Leeds United.

From then on Stoke produced a number of impressive performances as the side began to climb up the table. Stoke went into the final month of the season looking to claim a play-off spot but despite beating the likes of Leicester City and West Bromwich Albion frustrating draws against Cardiff City and Hull City meant that Stoke needed to win their final match away at Queens Park Rangers to have a chance of finishing 6th. It was not to be as a 1–1 was the result and City missed out on the play-offs by two points but it was a very positive season for the club.

== Season review ==
=== League ===
With Peter Coates and Tony Pulis back at the Britannia Stadium the main objective was to challenge for a place in the Premier League. The first act Pulis was since returning as manager was to bring in French forward Vincent Péricard from the club he just left Plymouth Argyle. Despite Pulis expecting big things from him, Péricard failed to impress and is considered one of the worst players to play for the club by supporters. A more successful signing was that of Southampton defender Danny Higginbotham for £225,000. Stoke lost their first match of the season away at newly promoted Southend United but won their first home match 2–0 against a Derby County side tipped to be promoted. But after a woefully boring draw at home to Plymouth, Pulis was booed by the Stoke supporters. On transfer deadline Stoke completed the signing of Jamaican striker Ricardo Fuller for a fee of £500,000 and he would go on to have an eventful six-year career with the club. Pulis again took stick from supporters after seeing their side throw away a two-goal lead at Barnsley. However, despite the poor start to the season Coates remained in full support of Pulis.

To address the problem Stoke signed Aston Villa winger Lee Hendrie, Liverpool midfielder Salif Diao and Sunderland midfielder Rory Delap whilst Andy Griffin extended his loan deal. And in their first match away at crisis club Leeds United Stoke produced a fine display winning 4–0 which signalled a change in the direction of the club. Stoke won their next match against top of the table Sunderland but suffered a blow as Rory Delap broke his leg in two places. Stoke then beat Norwich City 5–0 and signed Sunderland winger Liam Lawrence. This combined with a five match winning run pushed Stoke up the table and after a 1–0 win against Queens Park Rangers goalkeeper Steve Simonsen made history by keeping seven successive clean sheets. But Stoke were brought back down to Earth with a bump, losing 3–0 away at Colchester United.

In the January transfer window, Stoke signed Lee Martin, Dominic Matteo, Gabriel Zakuani and Jonathan Fortune whilst captain Michael Duberry left for Reading leaving Higginbotham to take over as club captain. Stoke then went through a tough run of form winning just two from ten until the end of March before beating Leicester City to get their promotion push back on track. Stoke then beat West Bromwich Albion and Crystal Palace before frustrating draws against Cardiff City and Hull City prevented Stoke closing the gap on 6th place Southampton. Stoke won their penultimate match of the season 3–1 against Colchester United to set up a decisive encounter away at Queens Park Rangers. However Stoke produced a disappointing performance and could only draw 1–1 meaning that they missed out on a play-off place by two points. Despite failing to reach the play-offs the feeling was greatly improved around the club for quite a while and there were high hopes Stoke could go one better in 2007–08 and finally gain promotion back to the top tier.

=== League Cup ===
Stoke kept up their poor showing in the first round of the League Cup this time in a truly woeful defeat against League Two Darlington. Stoke, at home, took the lead through Vincent Péricard after half an hour before Darlington were reduced to ten men. With a man advantage against poor opposition the expectation was to see out a routine win but Darlington scored twice without replay leaving Stoke and manager Pulis embarrassed.

=== FA Cup ===
Two late goals saw Stoke see off League One Millwall in the third round to set up an away match against Fulham but Stoke were easily beaten 3–0.

== Final league table ==
Pos	Team	Pld	W	D	L	GF	GA	GD	Pts	Promotion, qualification or relegation
6	Southampton	46	21	12	13	77	53	+24	75	Qualification for Championship play-offs
7	Preston North End	46	22	8	16	64	53	+11	74	
8	Stoke City	46	19	16	11	62	41	+21	73	
9	Sheffield Wednesday	46	20	11	15	70	66	+4	71	
10	Colchester United	46	20	9	17	70	56	+14	69	

Source: RSSSF
Rules for classification: In the Football League goals scored (F) takes precedence over goal difference (GD).

== Results ==
Stoke's score comes first

=== Legend ===
Win	Draw	Loss

=== Pre-season friendlies ===
Match	Date	Opponent	Venue	Result	Attendance	Scorers
1	9 July 2006	Newcastle Town	A	2–0		Sidibé, Nathan Blake
2	12 July 2006	Chester City	A	2–0		Sigurðsson, Kopteff
3	16 July 2006	FC Gratkorn	A	1–2		Brammer
4	18 July 2006	Manisaspor	A	1–1		Hoefkens (pen)
5	25 July 2006	PSV Eindhoven	H	0–0	4,175	
6	28 July 2006	Grimsby Town	A	1–0	867	Russell 65'

=== Football League Championship ===
Match	Date	Opponent	Venue	Result	Attendance	Scorers	Report
1	5 August 2006	Southend United	A	0–1	8,971		Report
2	8 August 2006	Derby County	H	2–0	20,013	Péricard 18', Russell 58'	Report
3	12 August 2006	Birmingham City	H	0–0	12,347		Report
4	19 August 2006	Luton Town	A	2–2	7,727	Sweeney 10', Chadwick 70'	Report
5	26 August 2006	Plymouth Argyle	H	1–1	11,626	Sidibé 39'	Report
6	9 September 2006	Barnsley	A	2–2	10,464	Hill 3', Chadwick 23'	Report
7	12 September 2006	Sheffield Wednesday	A	1–1	19,966	Paterson 34'	Report
8	16 September 2006	Burnley	H	0–1	12,247		Report
9	23 September 2006	Wolverhampton Wanderers	A	0–2	19,489		Report
10	30 September 2006	Preston North End	H	1–1	14,342	Fuller 41'	Report
11	14 October 2006	Leeds United	A	4–0	18,173	Hendrie 7', Griffin 58', Higginbotham 62', Fuller 88'	Report
12	17 October 2006	Sunderland	H	2–1	14,482	Hendrie 50', Péricard 54'	Report
13	21 October 2006	Southampton	A	0–1	20,531		Report
14	28 October 2006	Norwich City	H	5–0	13,444	Hendrie 22', Fuller 38', Higginbotham 74' (pen), Chadwick 79', Russell 90+2'	Report
15	31 October 2006	Leicester City	A	1–2	21,107	Fuller 42'	Report
16	6 November 2006	Coventry City	H	1–0	19,055	Griffin 60'	Report
17	11 November 2006	Crystal Palace	A	1–0	18,868	Russell 38'	Report
18	18 November 2006	Hull City	A	2–0	16,940	Higginbotham 2', Russell 80'	Report
19	25 November 2006	West Bromwich Albion	H	1–0	18,282	Higginbotham 40' (pen)	Report
20	28 November 2006	Cardiff City	H	3–0	15,309	Fuller 60', Lawrence 63', Sidibé 65'	Report
21	2 December 2006	Coventry City	A	0–0	19,073		Report
22	9 December 2006	Queens Park Rangers	H	1–0	16,487	Higginbotham 17' (pen)	Report
23	16 December 2006	Colchester United	A	0–3	5,345		Report
24	23 December 2006	Ipswich Town	A	1–0	20,369	Lawrence 71'	Report
25	26 December 2006	Sheffield Wednesday	H	1–2	23,003	Sidibé 60'	Report
26	30 December 2006	Leeds United	H	3–1	18,128	Sidibé 12', Ehiogu 54' (o.g.), Fuller 77'	Report
27	13 January 2007	Wolverhampton Wanderers	H	1–1	15,882	Hill 85'	Report
28	20 January 2007	Preston North End	A	2–3	15,151	Lawrence 2', Sidibé 7'	Report
29	23 January 2007	Burnley	A	1–0	12,109	Sidibé 24'	Report
30	30 January 2007	Ipswich Town	H	0–0	11,182		Report
31	3 February 2007	Southend United	H	1–1	23,017	Fuller 31'	Report
32	11 February 2007	Birmingham City	A	0–1	15,854		Report
33	17 February 2007	Luton Town	H	0–0	12,375		Report
34	21 February 2007	Derby County	A	2–0	24,897	Higginbotham 15' (pen), Matteo 26'	Report
35	26 February 2007	Barnsley	H	0–1	13,114		Report
36	3 March 2007	Plymouth Argyle	A	1–1	12,539	Russell 55'	Report
37	10 March 2007	Southampton	H	2–1	13,404	Fortune 34', Martin 72'	Report
38	13 March 2007	Sunderland	A	2–2	31,358	Russell 22', Hoefkens 45+3'	Report
39	24 March 2007	Norwich City	A	0–1	24,293		Report
40	31 March 2007	Leicester City	H	4–2	13,303	Parkin 18', Fuller 29' (pen), Sidibé 79', Lawrence 90+3'	Report
41	7 April 2007	West Bromwich Albion	A	3–1	20,386	Fuller 14', Greening 21' (o.g.), Parkin 22'	Report
42	9 April 2007	Crystal Palace	H	2–1	13,616	Parkin 20', Fuller 27'	Report
43	14 April 2007	Cardiff City	A	1–1	11,664	Hoefkens 30'	Report
44	21 April 2007	Hull City	H	1–1	17,109	Lawrence 45+4'	Report
45	28 April 2007	Colchester United	H	3–1	20,108	Russell 53', Sidibé 57', Higginbotham 62'	Report
46	6 May 2007	Queens Park Rangers	A	1–1	16,741	Sidibé 84'	Report

=== FA Cup ===
Round	Date	Opponent	Venue	Result	Attendance	Scorers	Report
R3	5 January 2007	Millwall	H	2–0	8,024	Elliott 84' (o.g.), Fuller 87'	Report
R4	27 January 2007	Fulham	A	0–3	11,059		Report

=== League Cup ===
Round	Date	Opponent	Venue	Result	Attendance	Scorers	Report
R1	22 August 2006	Darlington	H	1–2	3,573	Péricard 29'	Report

== Squad statistics ==
No.	Pos.	Name	League		FA Cup		League Cup		Total		Discipline	
No.	Pos.	Name	Apps	Goals	Apps	Goals	Apps	Goals	Apps	Goals	Yellow card	Red card
1	GK	(England) Steve Simonsen	46	0	2	0	1	0	49	0	3	0
2	DF	(Belgium) Carl Hoefkens	42(3)	2	2	0	0	0	44(3)	2	3	0
3	DF	(England) Marlon Broomes	0	0	0	0	0	0	0	0	0	0
4	MF	(England) John Eustace	7(8)	0	1	0	0(1)	0	8(9)	0	1	0
5	DF	(England) Michael Duberry	29	0	2	0	1	0	32	0	7	0
5	DF	(England) Jonathan Fortune	14	1	0	0	0	0	14	1	2	0
6	DF	(England) Clint Hill	15(3)	2	1	0	1	0	17(3)	1	5	1
7	FW	(Guinea) Sambégou Bangoura	1(3)	0	0	0	0	0	1(3)	0	1	0
8	MF	(England) Dave Brammer	11(11)	0	0(1)	0	0	0	11(12)	0	4	0
8	MF	(England) Jon Parkin	5(1)	3	0	0	0	0	5(1)	3	1	0
9	FW	(Mali) Mamady Sidibé	42(1)	9	2	0	1	0	45(1)	9	2	0
10	FW	(Iceland) Hannes Sigurðsson	0(2)	0	0	0	0(1)	0	0(3)	0	0	0
10	FW	(Jamaica) Ricardo Fuller	25(5)	10	1(1)	1	0	0	26(6)	11	9	2
11	MF	(Scotland) Kevin Harper	0(3)	0	0	0	0(1)	0	0(4)	0	0	0
12	MF	(Scotland) Peter Sweeney	10(3)	1	1	0	1	0	12(3)	1	0	0
14	DF	(England) Danny Higginbotham	44	7	2	0	0	0	46	7	3	0
15	FW	(France) Vincent Péricard	17(12)	2	1	0	1	1	19(12)	3	1	0
16	MF	(England) Lee Hendrie	26(2)	3	0	0	0	0	26(2)	3	7	0
17	MF	(England) Darel Russell	40(3)	7	2	0	1	0	43(3)	7	7	0
18	MF	(Senegal) Salif Diao	27	0	1(1)	0	0	0	28(1)	0	10	0
19	MF	(England) Luke Chadwick	13(2)	3	0	0	0	0	13(2)	3	1	0
19	DF	(Scotland) Dominic Matteo	9	1	1	0	0	0	10	1	1	0
20	DF	(England) Andy Griffin	32(1)	2	1	0	0	0	33(1)	2	10	1
21	MF	(England) Lee Martin	4(9)	1	1	0	0	0	5(9)	1	2	0
22	DF	(England) Lewis Buxton	1	0	0	0	0	0	1	0	0	0
23	MF	(Republic of Ireland) Liam Lawrence	27	5	1	0	0	0	28	5	3	0
24	MF	(Republic of Ireland) Rory Delap	2	0	0	0	0	0	2	0	0	0
25	GK	(England) Russell Hoult	0	0	0	0	0	0	0	0	0	0
26	MF	(Wales) Anthony Pulis	0(1)	0	0	0	1	0	1(1)	0	0	0
27	MF	(Czech Republic) Patrik Berger	1(6)	0	0	0	0	0	1(6)	0	0	0
27	DF	(Democratic Republic of the Congo) Gabriel Zakuani	9	0	0	0	0	0	9	0	1	0
28	DF	(England) Andy Wilkinson	2(2)	0	0(1)	0	0	0	2(3)	0	1	0
29	MF	(Northern Ireland) Jeff Whitley	0(3)	0	0	0	1	0	1(3)	0	1	0
30	FW	(Northern Ireland) Martin Paterson	0(9)	1	0	0	0(1)	0	0(10)	1	0	0
31	DF	(England) Carl Dickinson	5(8)	0	0	0	1	0	6(8)	0	1	0
32	MF	(Hungary) Ádám Vass	0	0	0	0	0	0	0	0	0	0
33	GK	(Republic of Ireland) Robert Duggan	0	0	0	0	0	0	0	0	0	0
34	FW	(Republic of Ireland) Adam Rooney	0(10)	0	0(2)	0	0	0	0(12)	0	0	0
35	MF	(Northern Ireland) Robert Garrett	0	0	0	0	0	0	0	0	0	0
36	MF	(Northern Ireland) Matthew Hazley	0	0	0	0	0	0	0	0	0	0
37	FW	(England) Keith Thomas	0	0	0	0	0	0	0	0	0	0
–	–	Own goals	–	2	–	1	–	0	–	3	–	–
