= Dave Brammer =

English footballer (born 1975)

Personal information
- Full name: David Brammer
- Date of birth: 28 February 1975 (age 51)
- Place of birth: Bromborough, England
- Height: 5 ft 10 in (1.78 m)
- Position: Midfielder

Youth career
- Wrexham

Senior career*
Years	Team	Apps	(Gls)
1993–1999	Wrexham	137	(12)
1999–2001	Port Vale	73	(3)
2001–2004	Crewe Alexandra	87	(4)
2004–2007	Stoke City	105	(2)
2007–2009	Millwall	40	(1)
2008	→ Port Vale (loan)	3	(0)
2009	Port Vale	10	(0)
Total		455	(22)
- * Club domestic league appearances and goals

David Brammer (born 28 February 1975) is an English former footballer. A midfielder, in a 16-year career, he scored 22 goals in 455 games in the Football League.

Starting his career at Wrexham in 1993, he lifted the Welsh Cup and FAW Premier Cup with the club. He moved on to Port Vale for an initial £350,000 fee in March 1999. In 2001, he lifted the Football League Trophy and was also made the club's Player of the Year. Following this success, he was sold to Crewe Alexandra for £500,000. He helped the "Alex" win promotion out of the Second Division in 2002–03. After three years with Crewe, he switched to Stoke City in 2007, becoming one of a few players to have played for the three local rivals of Crewe, Stoke and Vale. He spent 2007 to 2009 at Millwall before finishing his career at Vale Park later in 2009.

== Career ==
Brammer started his career at Welsh side Wrexham in 1993, under the management of Brian Flynn. He was on the fringes of the first-team in 1993–94 and 1994–95, as Wrexham lifted the Welsh Cup after a 2–1 win over Cardiff City at Cardiff Arms Park. He was again a much used squad member in 1995–96 and 1996–97. He played 34 games in 1997–98, as the club missed out on the Second Division play-offs due to their inferior goal difference. He did, however, win the FAW Premier Cup with the club in 1998 after a 2–1 win over Cardiff. Following 41 appearances in 1998–99, he moved Port Vale on transfer deadline day for an initial fee of £350,000 – one of Brian Horton's first signings as Vale manager. The fee would late rise by £100,000 due to appearances clauses.

Brammer, whose father was born in Burslem, helped Vale to escape relegation from the First Division in 1998–99, as the "Valiants" finished above Bury on goal difference. He was handed the club captaincy for the 1999–2000 season; however, he was unable to prevent Vale from being relegated. He had a poor start to his Vale Park career but soon won around his detractors after some improved performances and some long-range strikes on goal.

Brammer remained an important part of the Vale side in 2000–01. He scored 4 goals in 44 appearances, and all of his strikes were key: he got the only goal at Colchester United in the league and salvaged a point against Millwall, and also helped save the club's blushes by scoring at non-League Canvey Island in a 4–4 FA Cup tie. Most significantly, he saved the Vale from defeat in the 2001 Potteries derby at the Britannia Stadium with an 81st-minute equaliser. He also led the team to Football League Trophy glory, in the final he was the man of the match, inspiring a 2–1 victory over Brentford at the Millennium Stadium. Fans voted him Port Vale F.C. Player of the Year at the end of the campaign.

In August 2001, he made the short journey to Crewe Alexandra, who paid Vale £500,000 for his services; manager Dario Gradi described him as "probably the biggest [signing] in our history." The sale was highly criticised by Vale fans. He suffered with hernia trouble towards the end of the 2001–02 season, though by July 2002 the club were relegated and he was appointed club captain. After close to fifty games in the 2002–03 Second Division promotion season, he struggled with injury the next season. In October 2003, he was hit with a groin problem, which required corrective surgery the next month. In all his pelvic trouble caused him to miss five months of the season, though he was offered a new contract upon his recovery. Gradi had hoped Brammer would sign a new contract with the "Alex", but after weeks of speculation, in July 2004 he chose a return to the Potteries to join Championship club Stoke City.

Brammer scored three spectacular goals in his time at the Britannia Stadium and was a key player for manager Tony Pulis in 2004–05, making 44 appearances. He made 45 more appearances in 2005–06, though the new manager Johan Boskamp complained that Brammer was less than prolific in front of the goal. Pulis returned for the 2006–07 campaign. However, Brammer played half of his 22 league games from the bench and, in January 2007, was allowed to sign for Millwall on a free transfer. He was instrumental in saving Millwall from relegation out of League One due to his steadying influence in midfield, however, fell out of favour for the 2008–09 season.

He started training with his former club, Port Vale, on 27 October 2008 to stay fit. He impressed manager Dean Glover, and four days later, Vale signed Brammer on a month's loan. On 27 November, the club announced that they would be extending Brammer's loan until January. After recovering from a knee injury, he was released by Millwall in January 2009, at which point he signed with Vale. He then tore cartilage in his knee and was sidelined for three weeks. He made 14 appearances in 2008–09, however, Vale chairman Bill Bratt informed him by voicemail that he would not be offered a new contract for the 2009–10 season. The 34-year-old intended to find another club, but never did.

== Later life ==
Brammer became a football agent after retiring as a player.

== Career statistics ==
Appearances and goals by club, season and competition
Club	Season	League			FA Cup		League Cup		Other		Total	
Club	Season	Division	Apps	Goals	Apps	Goals	Apps	Goals	Apps	Goals	Apps	Goals
Wrexham	1992–93	Third Division	2	0	0	0	0	0	0	0	2	0
Wrexham	1993–94	Second Division	22	2	1	0	0	0	2	0	25	2
Wrexham	1994–95	Second Division	14	1	0	0	2	0	2	0	18	1
Wrexham	1995–96	Second Division	11	2	2	0	1	0	2	0	16	2
Wrexham	1996–97	Second Division	21	1	2	0	1	0	1	0	25	1
Wrexham	1997–98	Second Division	33	4	0	0	1	0	1 (Note: Appearance(s) in the EFL Trophy.)	0	35	4
Wrexham	1998–99	Second Division	34	2	5	1	2	0	6	1	47	5
Wrexham	Total		137	12	10	1	7	0	14	1	168	14
Port Vale	1998–99	First Division	9	0	—		—		—		9	0
Port Vale	1999–00	First Division	29	0	0	0	2	0	—		31	0
Port Vale	2000–01	Second Division	35	3	2	1	0	0	7	0	44	4
Port Vale	Total		73	3	2	1	2	0	7	0	84	4
Crewe Alexandra	2001–02	First Division	30	2	4	0	2	1	—		36	3
Crewe Alexandra	2002–03	Second Division	41	1	4	1	2	0	2	0	49	2
Crewe Alexandra	2003–04	First Division	16	1	0	0	2	0	—		18	1
Crewe Alexandra	Total		87	4	8	1	6	1	2	0	103	6
Stoke City	2004–05	Championship	43	1	0	0	1	0	—		44	1
Stoke City	2005–06	Championship	40	1	4	0	1	1	—		45	2
Stoke City	2006–07	Championship	22	0	1	0	0	0	—		23	0
Stoke City	Total		105	2	5	0	2	1	—		112	3
Millwall	2006–07	League One	17	1	0	0	0	0	0	0	17	1
Millwall	2007–08	League One	23	0	2	0	0	0	0	0	25	0
Millwall	Total		40	1	2	0	0	0	0	0	42	1
Port Vale	2008–09	League Two	13	0	1	0	—		—		14	0
Career total			455	22	28	3	17	2	23	1	523	28

== Honours ==
Wrexham

- Welsh Cup: 1995
- FAW Premier Cup: 1998

Port Vale

- Football League Trophy: 2000–01

Crewe Alexandra

- Football League Second Division second-place promotion: 2002–03

Individual

- Port Vale Player of the Year: 2001
