= Martin Kolář =

Czech association football player

Personal information
- Full name: Martin Kolář
- Date of birth: 18 September 1983 (age 43)
- Place of birth: Prague, Czechoslovakia
- Height: 1.78 m (5 ft 10 in)
- Position: Left winger

Youth career
- 1996–1997: TJ Sokol Stodůlky
- 1997–2001: Bohemians 1905

Senior career*
Years	Team	Apps	(Gls)
2001–2002	Bohemians 1905	11	(1)
2002–2007	Anderlecht	42	(2)
2005	→ Stoke City (loan)	14	(1)
2006	→ Westerlo (loan)	13	(1)
2006–2007	→ Ajaccio (loan)	23	(0)
2007–2008	Helsingborgs IF	10	(0)
2009–2010	AEP Paphos	21	(0)
2010–2012	Apollon Limassol	39	(0)
2012–2014	Bohemians 1905	19	(1)
2014–2019	Elseremo Brumov		
Total		192	(6)

International career
2003–2005	Czech Republic U-21	8	(1)
- * Club domestic league appearances and goals

Martin Kolář (born 18 September 1983) is a Czech former professional footballer who played as a winger.

== Career ==
Kolář played with AC Ajaccio in Ligue 2, with Stoke City in The Championship (on loan, scoring once against Norwich City), with R.S.C. Anderlecht and K.V.C. Westerlo in the Belgian First Division A and with Helsingborgs IF in Allsvenskan.

== Career statistics ==
Appearances and goals by club, season and competition
Club	Season	League			National Cup		League Cup		Other		Total	
Club	Season	Division	Apps	Goals	Apps	Goals	Apps	Goals	Apps	Goals	Apps	Goals
Bohemians 1905	2001–02	Czech First League	11	1	0	0	—		—		11	1
Anderlecht	2002–03	Belgian First Division	24	1	1	0	—		2 (Note: Appearances in UEFA Cup)	0	27	1
Anderlecht	2003–04	Belgian First Division	18	1	5	0	—		5 (Note: Appearances in UEFA Champions League)	0	28	1
Anderlecht	2004–05	Belgian First Division	0	0	0	0	—		0	0	0	0
Anderlecht	Total		42	2	6	0	—		7	0	55	2
Stoke City (loan)	2005–06	Championship	14	1	0	0	1	0	—		15	1
Westerlo (loan)	2005–06	Belgian First Division	13	1	1	0	—		—		14	1
Ajaccio (loan)	2006–07	Ligue 2	23	0	0	0	0	0	—		23	0
Helsingborgs IF	2007	Allsvenskan	6	0	0	0	—		4	0	10	0
Helsingborgs IF	2008	Allsvenskan	4	0	0	0	—		—		4	0
Helsingborgs IF	Total		10	0	0	0	—		4	0	14	0
AEP Paphos	2009–10	Cypriot First Division	21	0	0	0	—		—		21	0
Apollon Limassol	2010–11	Cypriot First Division	21	0	0	0	—		2 (Note: Appearances in UEFA Europa League)	0	23	0
Apollon Limassol	2011–12	Cypriot First Division	18	0	0	0	—		—		18	0
Apollon Limassol	Total		39	0	0	0	—		2	0	41	0
Bohemians 1905	2012–13	Czech 2. Liga	7	1	0	0	—		—		7	1
Bohemians 1905	2013–14	Czech First League	12	0	0	0	—		—		12	0
Bohemians 1905	Total		19	1	0	0	—		—		19	1
Career total			192	6	7	0	1	0	13	0	213	6
