= Robert Garrett (footballer) =

Northern Irish footballer

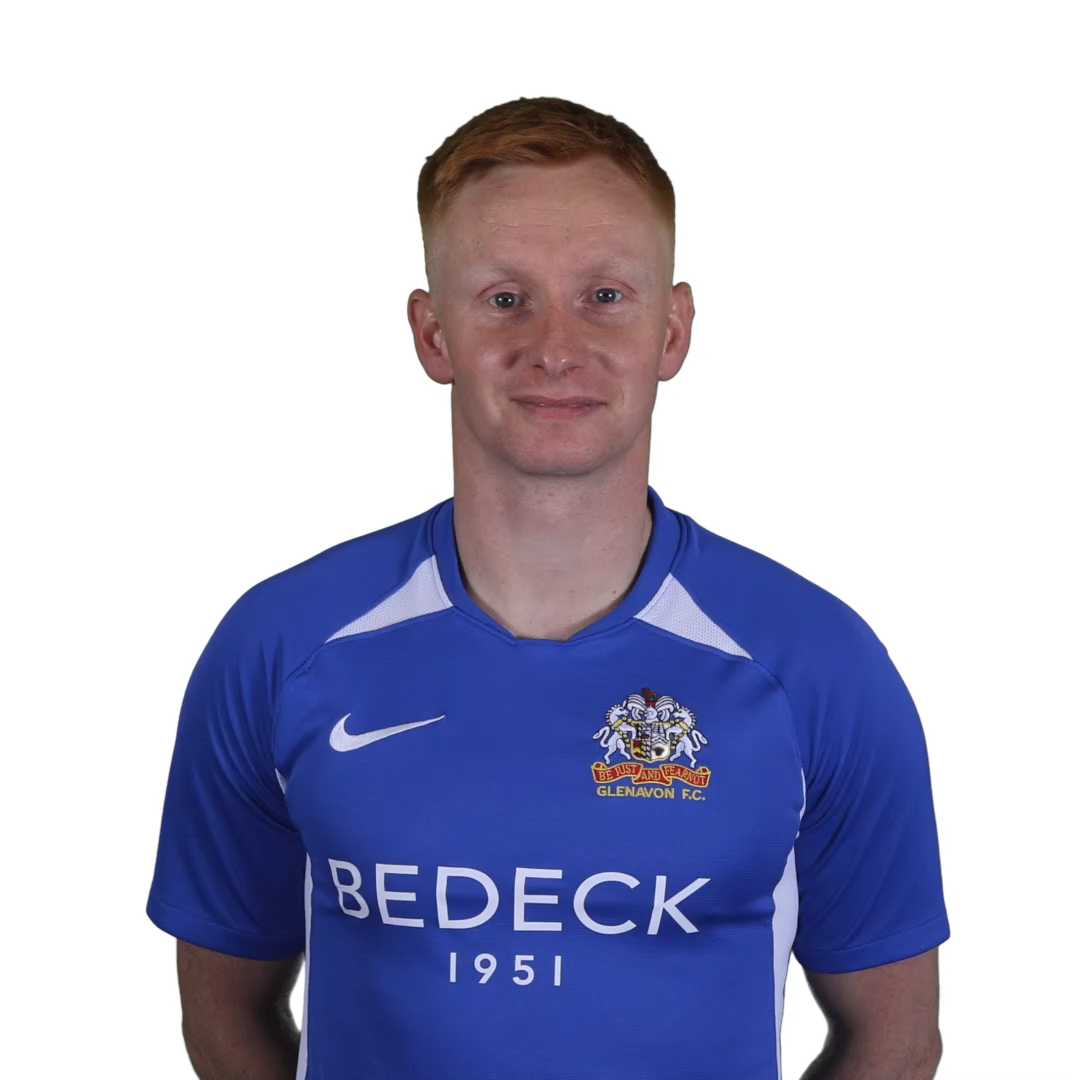
- Robert Garrett, Glenavon FC Robert Garrett with Glenavon in 2020

Personal information
- Full name: Robert Garrett
- Date of birth: 5 May 1988 (age 38)
- Place of birth: Belfast, Northern Ireland
- Position: Defensive midfielder

Youth career
- 2002–2004: Stoke City

Senior career*
Years	Team	Apps	(Gls)
2004–2007	Stoke City	2	(0)
2007	→ Wrexham (loan)	10	(0)
2007–2008	→ Wrexham (loan)	12	(0)
2008–2014	Linfield	149	(16)
2013	→ FC Edmonton (loan)	21	(1)
2014–2017	Portadown	100	(5)
2017–2019	Linfield	36	(2)
2019–2024	Glenavon	155	(7)
2024–2026	Bangor	52	(2)
Total		539	(33)

International career
	Northern Ireland U21	14	(3)
2008–2010	Northern Ireland U23	3	(1)
2009–2011	Northern Ireland	5	(0)
- * Club domestic league appearances and goals as of 29 April 2026

Robert Garrett (born 5 May 1988) is a Northern Irish former footballer who played as a defensive midfielder. During his career, he played for Stoke City, Wrexham, Linfield, FC Edmonton, Portadown, Glenavon & Bangor before announcing his retirement in April 2026.

== Club career ==
Garrett joined Stoke City in 2002 and played just twice for the club both coming as a substitute in games towards the end of the 2005–06 season. In the 2006–07 season, Garrett enjoyed a loan spell at Football League Two side Wrexham. He returned to Wrexham again on loan in the 2007–08 season. In the summer of 2007 Garrett returned to Belfast and joined Linfield and became one of their most important players. As Linfield added more quality to their midfield Robert's first team chances dried up, at which stage he had to consider his future.

On 16 April 2013 Garrett followed fellow Linfield men Daryl Fordyce and Albert Watson joining NASL club FC Edmonton on loan for their 2013 season.

On 2 May 2014, it was confirmed that Garrett had signed for Portadown. Garrett captained the Ports for the first time in a 2–2 draw with Glenavon in 2016.

It was announced in May 2017 that Garrett would be returning to Linfield.

On 16 January 2019, it was announced that Garrett had joined Glenavon on a 2 1/2-year deal. After playing 150 league games in five years with the club, Garrett departed Glenavon at the end of the 2023-24 season. He signed for Bangor on 20 May 2024.

== International career ==
In May 2009, Garrett received his first call up to the Northern Ireland squad for a friendly with Italy in Pisa. He was one of five Irish League players called up, one of which was former Linfield teammate Alan Mannus.

== Career statistics ==
=== Club ===
As of 29 April 2024

Club	Season	League			FA Cup		League Cup		Europe		Total	
Club	Season	Division	Apps	Goals	Apps	Goals	Apps	Goals	Apps	Goals	Apps	Goals
Stoke City	2005–06	Championship	2	0	0	0	0	0	—		2	0
Stoke City	2006–07	Championship	0	0	0	0	0	0	—		0	0
Stoke City	2007–08	Championship	0	0	0	0	0	0	—		0	0
Stoke City	Total		2	0	0	0	0	0	—		2	0
Wrexham (loan)	2006–07	League Two	10	0	0	0	0	0	—		10	0
Wrexham (loan)	2007–08	League Two	12	0	1	0	0	0	—		13	0
Wrexham (loan)	Total		22	0	1	0	0	0	—		23	0
Linfield	2008–09	NIFL Premiership	30	4	0	0	0	0	—		30	4
Linfield	2009–10	NIFL Premiership	27	2	0	0	0	0	2	0	29	2
Linfield	2010–11	NIFL Premiership	35	6	0	0	1	0	2	0	38	6
Linfield	2011–12	NIFL Premiership	30	4	2	0	1	0	2	0	35	4
Linfield	2012–13	NIFL Premiership	20	0	0	0	1	0	4	1	25	1
Linfield	2013–14	NIFL Premiership	7	0	0	0	0	0	1	0	8	0
Linfield	Total		149	16	2	0	3	0	11	1	165	17
FC Edmonton (loan)	2013	North American Soccer League	21	1	2	0	0	0	—		23	1
Portadown	2014–15	NIFL Premiership	33	1	3	0	2	0	—		38	1
Portadown	2015–16	NIFL Premiership	32	1	2	0	0	0	—		34	1
Portadown	2016–17	NIFL Premiership	35	3	2	0	1	0	—		38	3
Portadown	Total		100	5	7	0	3	0	—		110	5
Linfield	2017–18	NIFL Premiership	26	2	1	0	0	0	—		27	2
Linfield	2018–19	NIFL Premiership	10	0	0	0	0	0	—		10	0
Linfield	Total		36	2	1	0	0	0	—		37	2
Glenavon	2018–19	NIFL Premiership	11	1	0	0	0	0	—		11	1
Glenavon	2019–20	NIFL Premiership	24	3	0	0	0	0	—		24	3
Glenavon	2020–21	NIFL Premiership	33	2	0	0	0	0	—		33	2
Glenavon	2021–22	NIFL Premiership	30	0	0	0	2	0	—		32	0
Glenavon	2022–23	NIFL Premiership	22	1	1	0	1	0	—		24	1
Glenavon	2023–24	NIFL Premiership	30	0	2	0	3	0	—		35	0
Glenavon	Total		150	7	3	0	5	0	—		158	7
Career Total			480	31	15	0	11	0	11	1	518	32

=== International ===
National team	Year	Apps	Goals
Northern Ireland	2009	1	0
Northern Ireland	2010	2	0
Northern Ireland	2011	2	0
Total		5	0
