= Kremis =

- Commune and small town
- Location in Mali
- Coordinates: 15°21′02″N 10°20′45″W
- Country: Mali
- Region: Kayes Region
- Cercle: Yélimané Cercle

Population (2009 census)
  - Total: 10,467
- Time zone: UTC+0 (GMT)

Kremis is a small town and commune in the Cercle of Yélimané in the Kayes Region of south-western Mali. In 2009 the commune had a population of 10,467.
