= Jan de Koning (footballer) =

Dutch footballer, scout and manager

Personal information
- Full name: Jan de Koning
- Date of birth: 7 October 1949 (age 77)
- Place of birth: Amsterdam, Netherlands
- Position: Forward

Senior career*
Years	Team	Apps	(Gls)
1968–1970	Ajax	0	(0)
1970–1971	→ Vitesse (loan)	18	(0)
1971–1973	Ajax	0	(0)
1973–1978	Lokeren	97	(17)
1978–1980	Cercle Brugge	32	(6)
- * Club domestic league appearances and goals

Jan de Koning (born October 7, 1949, in Amsterdam, Netherlands) is a Dutch footballer, scout and manager. He played as a forward. After working as assistant technical director at Liverpool F.C.'s Academy, he now scouts for Portsmouth F.C. in Europe.

== Player ==
In his playing career, de Koning played for Ajax, Vitesse Arnhem, Lokeren, and Cercle Brugge. De Koning also regularly played for the Netherlands U18 and U21 national teams. During his career de Koning played with many of renowned players such as Johan Cruyff, Ruud Krol, Johan Neeskens, Arie Haan and Johnny Rep.

After his playing career de Koning spent time in his family’s scrap metal business while achieving his coaching qualifications in the Netherlands. In 1990, after receiving all of his coaching qualifications, de Koning was asked to join Ajax by Louis van Gaal to develop young talent. During his time at Ajax he trained some internationally known players such as Wesley Sneijder, Rafael van der Vaart, Johnny Heitinga and Dave Van den Bergh. Van der Vaart later stated in a Dutch TV interview that de Koning was the best coach he ever had.

== Scout ==
De Koning also is renowned for his eye for talent. In 1994, #10 of Top Sport Group, and later ISM International brought him in as a talent scout. During the following eight years de Koning oversaw the transfer of several big-name players between clubs, notably Cristian Chivu. Chivu was bought by Ajax on de Koning's recommendation for 2.5 million euros and later sold to AS Roma for 20 million euros. In 2002, de Koning scouted for Premier League clubs in England, working with Sunderland, Newcastle United, and for Ray Clarke at Southampton.

== Manager ==
Later in 2003, de Koning was yet again asked for help, this time from ex-Ajax footballer Piet Hamberg. Over the next two years, Hamberg and de Koning managed Al Jazira Club (United Arab Emirates) and Ettifaq FC (Saudi Arabia).

In 2005, the Stoke City F.C. board appointed Arnor Gudjohnsen to find a new manager. His nomination was Jan de Koning, but he did not want to be No 1, so suggested his friend, the former Holland midfielder Johan Boskamp. de Koning served as assistant manager under Boskamp. De Koning was twice suspended by Stoke due to disagreements within the management team. He was sacked by Stoke in April 2006.

During 2006 de Koning once again worked with Ray Clarke, serving as head scout for Celtic, until 2007 when he joined Piet Hamburg at Liverpool's Academy. He is now scouting for Portsmouth, concentrating on Holland, Belgium and Germany.
