= Peter Kopteff =

Finnish footballer (born 1979)

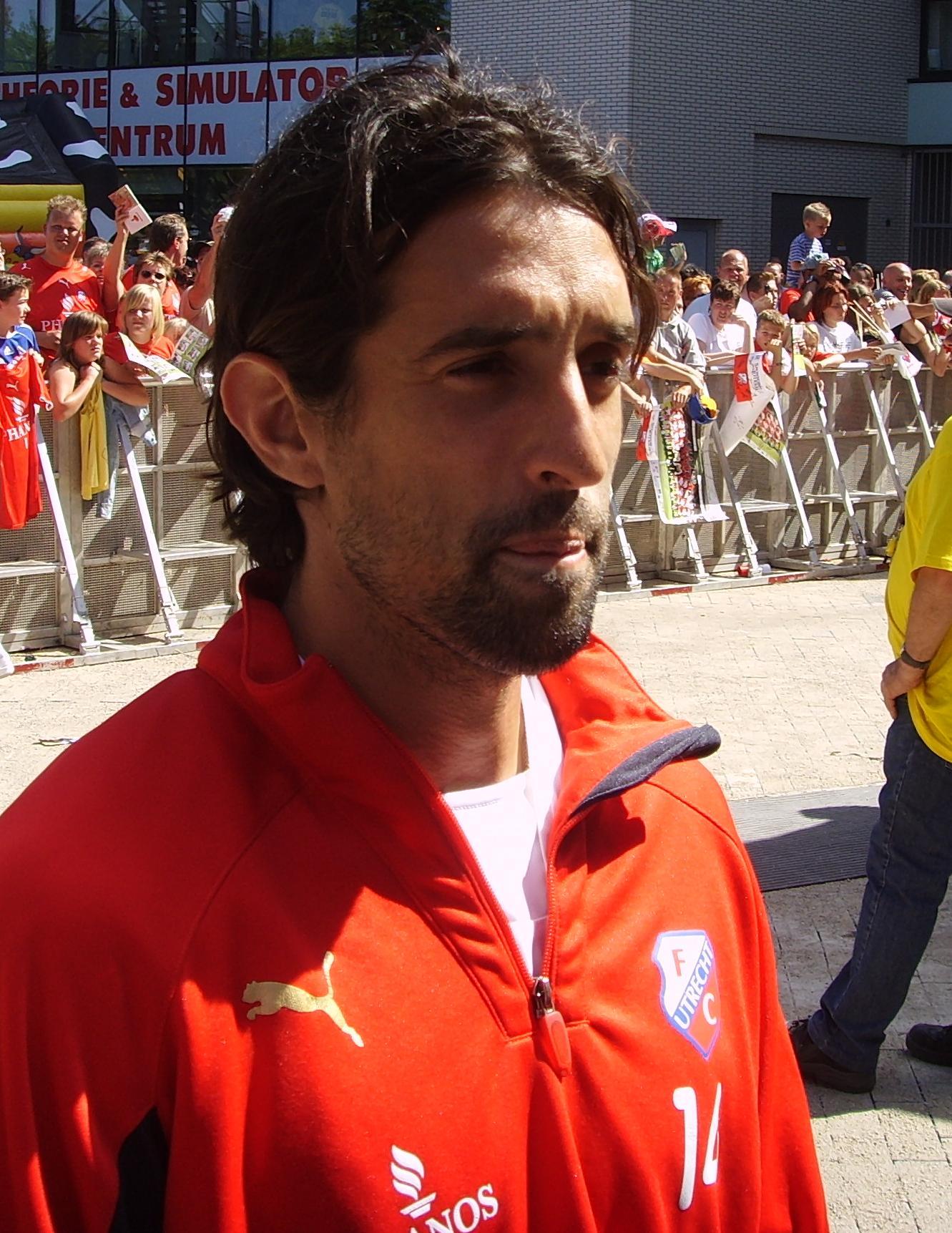

Personal information
- Date of birth: 10 April 1979 (age 47)
- Place of birth: Helsinki, Finland
- Height: 1.80 m (5 ft 11 in)
- Position: Winger

Senior career*
Years	Team	Apps	(Gls)
1998–2001	HJK Helsinki	66	(4)
1998	→ Jazz Pori (loan)	10	(2)
2001–2005	Viking	101	(12)
2005–2006	Stoke City	6	(0)
2006–2008	Utrecht	33	(4)
2008–2009	Aalesund	18	(4)
Total		234	(25)

International career
2002–2009	Finland	39	(1)
- * Club domestic league appearances and goals

Peter Kopteff (born 10 April 1979) is a Finnish former professional footballer who played as a left winger.

== Club career ==
Kopteff was born in Helsinki and began his career with HJK Helsinki and Jazz Pori in Finnish Veikkausliiga, and appeared in five UEFA Champions League group stage matches during HJK's 1998 campaign. He spent four years at Stavanger making over 100 Tippeligaen appearances. Whilst at Viking he scored one of the goals as they famously defeated Chelsea in the UEFA Cup in 2002. He joined English club Stoke City in December 2005. Kopteff failed to make any impact at Stoke making nine appearances in 2005–06 and was released at the end of the season. He then joined Dutch side FC Utrecht where he spent two years and on 31 August 2008 Kopteff signed a short-term contract to play for Aalesund for the remainder of the 2008 season. The contract was later extended for the 2009 season at the end of which he decided to retire.

== International career ==
Kopteff used to be a regular squad member of the Finland national football team. Due to his lack of first-team football caused by an injury during his second season in Utrecht, he has not played international football since 2007, only limiting him to occasional call-ups. He has been capped 39 times and scored once. He was recalled to the national team in April 2009 against Norway.

== Career statistics ==
=== Club ===
Club	Season	League			FA Cup		League Cup		Total	
Club	Season	Division	Apps	Goals	Apps	Goals	Apps	Goals	Apps	Goals
HJK Helsinki	1997	Veikkausliiga	4	1	—		—		4	1
HJK Helsinki	1998	Veikkausliiga	6	0	—		—		6	0
HJK Helsinki	1999	Veikkausliiga	10	0	—		—		10	0
HJK Helsinki	2000	Veikkausliiga	17	1	—		—		17	1
HJK Helsinki	2001	Veikkausliiga	29	2	—		—		29	2
HJK Helsinki	Total		66	4	—		—		66	4
Jazz Pori (loan)	1999	Veikkausliiga	10	1	—		—		10	1
Viking	2002	Tippeligaen	25	3	—		—		25	3
Viking	2003	Tippeligaen	26	3	—		—		26	3
Viking	2004	Tippeligaen	24	3	—		—		24	3
Viking	2005	Tippeligaen	26	3	—		—		26	3
Viking	Total		101	12	—		—		101	12
Stoke City	2005–06	Championship	6	0	3	0	0	0	9	0
FC Utrecht	2006–07	Eredivisie	30	4	—		—		30	4
FC Utrecht	2007–08	Eredivisie	3	0	—		—		3	0
FC Utrecht	Total		33	4	—		—		33	4
Aalesunds FK	2008	Tippeligaen	6	1	—		—		6	1
Aalesunds FK	2009	Tippeligaen	12	3	—		—		12	3
Aalesunds FK	Total		18	4	—		—		18	4
Career Total			234	25	3	0	0	0	237	25

=== International ===
National team	Year	Apps	Goals
Finland	2002	3	0
Finland	2003	14	0
Finland	2004	8	1
Finland	2005	9	0
Finland	2006	0	0
Total		34	1
