= Gunnar Gíslason (businessman) =

Icelandic businessman

Gunnar Þór Gíslason is an Icelandic businessman who was the chairman of Stoke City F.C. between November 1999 and May 2006. At the time he was the youngest chairman in the Football League.

== Chairman of Stoke City ==
In November 1999 Gunnar Þór Gíslason led an Icelandic consortium of businessman to take over English football club Stoke City from Peter Coates. He appointed his own choice of manager, Guðjón Þórðarson who led to club to the Division One in 2002. But he was sacked by Gunnar after a contract dispute. Steve Cotterill was appointed but quickly left and Tony Pulis was given the role to keep Stoke in the second tier. He succeeded but after a poor 2004–05 season Pulis was sacked for "failing to exploit the foreign transfer market" and in his place came Dutch manager Johan Boskamp. He was in charge for just a season and in May 2006 Gunnar Gíslason was resigned as chairman of Stoke City, selling control of the club back to Peter Coates who re-appointed Tony Pulis.
