= Hannes Sigurðsson =

Icelandic footballer (born 1983)

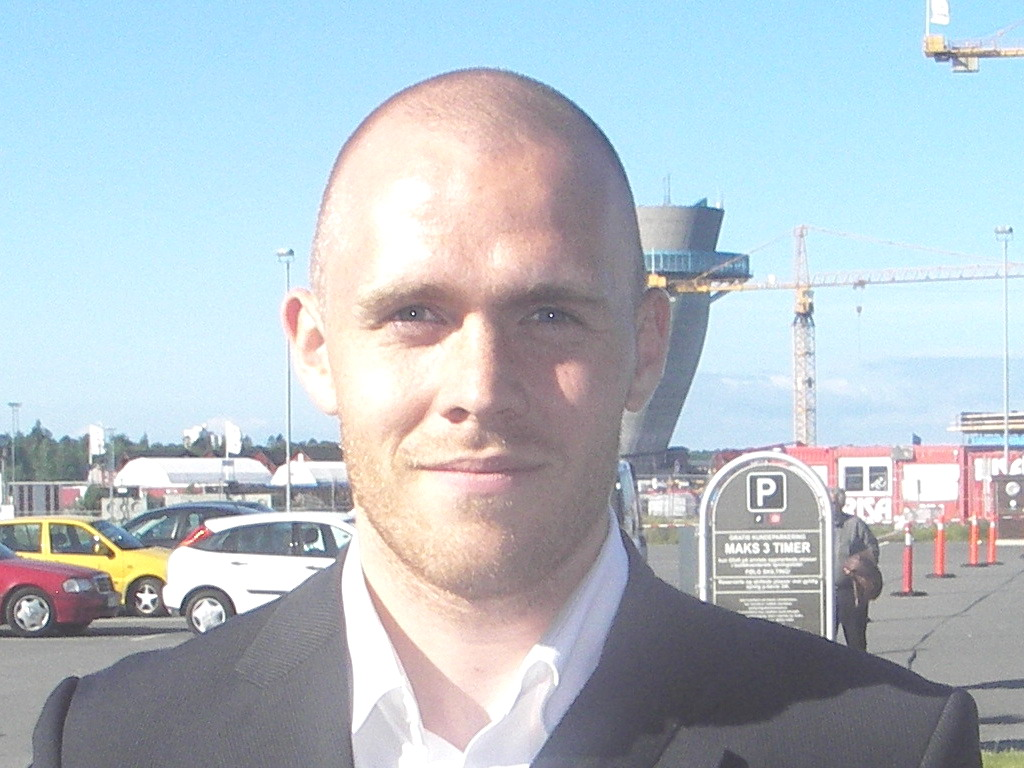
- Hannes in 2007

Personal information
- Full name: Hannes Þorsteinn Sigurðsson
- Date of birth: 10 April 1983 (age 43)
- Place of birth: Reykjavík, Iceland
- Height: 1.90 m (6 ft 3 in)
- Position: Forward

Team information
- Current team: SV Wacker Burghausen (manager)

Senior career*
Years	Team	Apps	(Gls)
2000–2001	FH	12	(2)
2002–2005	Viking	65	(15)
2005–2006	Stoke City	25	(1)
2006–2007	Brøndby IF	9	(2)
2007–2008	Viking	25	(4)
2008–2011	GIF Sundsvall	71	(26)
2011	FH	12	(3)
2011	Spartak Nalchik	6	(0)
2012	Atyrau	15	(3)
2013	Mjällby	10	(0)
2013–2014	SV Grödig	14	(1)
2014	Sandnes Ulf	10	(0)
2015	Jahn Regensburg	3	(0)
2016	Egersund	9	(0)

International career
1999	Iceland U-17	2	(0)
2001	Iceland U-19	4	(6)
2002–2005	Iceland U-21	14	(7)
2005–2008	Iceland	13	(1)

Managerial career
- 2018–2022: FC Deisenhofen
- 2022–: SV Wacker Burghausen
- * Club domestic league appearances and goals

Hannes Þorsteinn Sigurðsson (born 10 April 1983) is an Icelandic football manager and former player who played as a forward. He is the manager of German club SV Wacker Burghausen.

== Playing career ==
Hannes started his professional career with FH Hafnarfjordur in 2000, scoring on his debut and scoring one goal in eleven matches in 2001.

He moved to Norway to play for Viking FK in 2002, and although he came on as a substitute to score twice on his debut, he spent the best part of his first three seasons in Norway on the substitutes' bench. While he played in 55 matches during these three years, he only started in six of these. However, Hannes emerged as a super-sub, racking up twelve goals to make him the most efficient player in the Norwegian League with one goal every 72 minutes in 2002 and 2003. He emerged as a regular starter in 2005, when he also got his Iceland national team debut against Italy in March.

In July 2005, he signed for English club Stoke City on a Bosman transfer, and he joined his new club in October 2005. He scored his only goal for Stoke in a 2–1 victory over Queens Park Rangers in March 2006. When ownership of the club changed in the Summer 2006, and Boskamp left and Tony Pulis returned to the club, Hannes was deemed surplus to requirements and was released at the end of August.

On 30 August 2006, Hannes signed a deal with Danish Superliga runners-up Brøndby IF. He was a first-team regular throughout the autumn season, though injuries caused him to miss several games. He fell out of favour when manager René Meulensteen was replaced by Tom Køhlert ahead of the spring season, and Hannes looked to leave Brøndby.

Hannes returned to his former club Viking in February 2007, but his registration for the Norwegian club was delayed by the FIFA ruling that a player may only represent two clubs during one year. After a lengthy appeals process, Hannes was finally cleared to play for Viking on 30 March 2007 – one day before the closure of the Norwegian transfer window.

In March 2008, Hannes signed for Swedish club GIF Sundsvall, becoming the club's most expensive signing to date, Hannes was the club's top scorer in 2008, 2009, and 2010, even though he missed out on many games through injury. Following three successful years in Sweden, Hannes returned to Iceland to recover from a broken bone in his right foot that kept him sidelined for five months.

He then signed a short-term contract with his parent club FH Hafnarfjordur, where he played 13 games, scoring four goals.

In August 2011 Hannes joined PFC Spartak Nalchik in the Russian Premier League on a short-term contract. Hannes' style of play was not suitable for the Russian side, so his contract was not extended in January.

Hannes chose to stay in Eastern Europe, and in February 2012 he signed a one-year contract for FC Atyrau in Kazakhstan. Hannes finished the season as top scorer for the struggling FC Atyrau side and was voted as foreign player of the year by Westside.kz which is a fanclub for FC Atyrau.

Hannes signed a short-term contract with Swedish club Mjällby in 2013 and a two-year contract with recently promoted Austrian Bundesliga club SV Grödig in July 2013.

In 2015, he went on to SSV Jahn Regensburg. Ahead of the 2016 season he joined Norwegian third-tier side Egersunds IK as playing assistant to Maurice Ross.

== Managerial career ==
In 2018, Hannes was appointed manager of German sixth tier club FC Deisenhofen. The club earned promotion to the fifth tier Bayernliga Süd in his first season.

In April 2022, Hannes was hired by SV Wacker Burghausen in the fourth-tier Regionalliga Bayern.

== Career statistics ==
=== Club ===
Appearances and goals by club, season and competition
Club	Season	League			National cup		League cup		Europe		Other		Total	
Club	Season	Division	Apps	Goals	Apps	Goals	Apps	Goals	Apps	Goals	Apps	Goals	Apps	Goals
FH Hafnarfjörður	2000	1. deild karla	1	1	0	0	0	0	—		—		1	1
FH Hafnarfjörður	2001	Úrvalsdeild	11	1	3	0	0	0	—		—		14	1
FH Hafnarfjörður	Total		12	2	3	0	0	0	—		—		15	2
Viking	2002	Tippeligaen	12	4	2	2	—		1	1	—		15	7
Viking	2003	Tippeligaen	23	5	4	2	—		—		—		27	7
Viking	2004	Tippeligaen	16	3	4	2	—		—		—		20	5
Viking	2005	Tippeligaen	14	3	4	3	—		3	0	—		21	6
Viking	Total		65	15	14	9	—		4	1	—		83	25
Stoke City	2005–06	Championship	23	1	3	0	0	0	—		—		26	1
Stoke City	2006–07	Championship	2	0	0	0	1	0	—		—		3	0
Stoke City	Total		25	1	3	0	1	0	—		—		29	1
Brøndby IF	2006–07	Danish Superliga	9	2	0	0	—		2	0	3 (Note: Appearances in Royal League.)	2	14	4
Viking	2007	Tippeligaen	25	4	5	4	—		—		—		30	8
GIF Sundsvall	2008	Allsvenskan	25	6	0	0	—		—		—		25	6
GIF Sundsvall	2009	Superettan	22	10	2	1	—		—		—		24	11
GIF Sundsvall	2010	Superettan	24	10	1	0	—		—		2 (Note: Appearances in promotion play-offs.)	0	27	10
GIF Sundsvall	Total		71	26	3	1	—		—		2	0	76	27
FH Hafnarfjörður	2011	Úrvalsdeild	12	3	2	1	0	0	2	0	1 (Note: Appearance in Icelandic Super Cup.)	1	17	5
Spartak Nalchik	2011–12	Russian Premier League	6	0	0	0	—		—		—		6	0
Atyrau	2012	Kazakhstan Premier League	15	3	0	0	—		—		—		15	3
Mjällby	2013	Allsvenskan	10	0	0	0	—		—		—		10	0
SV Grödig	2013–14	Austrian Bundesliga	14	1	0	0	—		—		—		14	1
Sandnes Ulf	2014	Tippeligaen	10	0	0	0	—		—		—		10	0
Jahn Regensburg	2014–15	3. Liga	3	0	0	0	—		—		—		3	0
Egersund	2016	2. divisjon	9	0	0	0	—		—		—		9	0
Career total			286	57	30	15	1	0	8	1	6	3	331	76

=== International ===
Appearances and goals by national team and year
National team	Year	Apps	Goals
Iceland	2005	4	1
Iceland	2006	5	0
Iceland	2007	3	0
Iceland	2008	1	0
Total		13	1
