= Sambégou Bangoura =

Guinean footballer (born 1982)

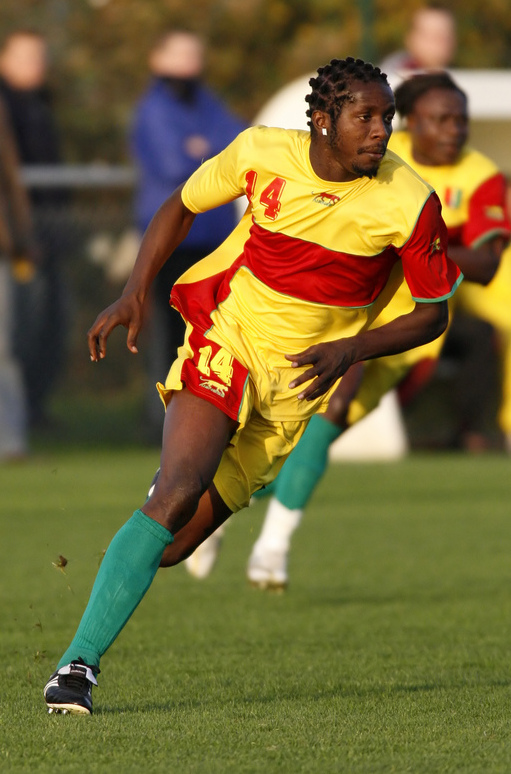

Personal information
- Date of birth: 3 April 1982 (age 44)
- Place of birth: Conakry, Guinea
- Position: Striker

Youth career
- 1999: Gangan
- 2000: AS Kaloum Star

Senior career*
Years	Team	Apps	(Gls)
2000–2003	Lokeren	85	(42)
2003–2005	Standard Liège	53	(21)
2005–2007	Stoke City	28	(9)
2007	→ Brussels (loan)	12	(3)
2007–2009	Boavista	13	(1)
2008	→ Cádiz (loan)	10	(1)
2009–2013	Panserraikos	73	(24)
2011	→ Al-Ahly Tripoli (loan)	0	(0)
2013–2015	AS Kaloum Star		
2015–2016	RFC Tournai		
Total		274	(101)

International career
2000-2013	Guinea	32	(9)
- * Club domestic league appearances and goals

Sambégou Bangoura (born 3 April 1982) is a Guinean former footballer who played as a striker.

== Career ==
Bangoura started his footballing career in Belgium with Lokeren and then Standard Liège before leaving to play in The Championship with Stoke City. transferred for £900,000 in August 2005, a club record fee at that time. He began the 2005–06 season well scoring eight goals in ten matches but was hampered after he failed to return to the club after playing in the Africa Cup of Nations.

In June 2006, he did not return to pre-season training for the 2006–07 season and a club statement confirmed that Bangoura would be fined on his eventual return. On 4 August 2006, one day before club's first game against Southend United, he returned to The Potters. He claimed the reason for his late arrival was that he could not get a passport for his young daughter, who had to remain in Guinea. Bangoura was handed his first start of the season against Burnley, however he lasted only 43 minutes before limping off due to injury. He failed to cement a starting place, and speculations for a loan or permanent move arose.

Bangoura joined FC Brussels on a 6-month loan on 11 January 2007, in the hope to get first team action. The personal problems he had experienced in England continued in Belgium. On 13 August 2007, Bangoura signed for Portuguese club Boavista F.C. for a fee of £270,000. He would not last long, as he joined Spain's Cádiz CF on loan, during the January transfer window. He then joined Greek side Panserraikos in 2009 where he stayed until March 2013.

In April 2013, he joined AS Kaloum Star.

== International career ==
He was part of the Guinean 2004 African Nations Cup team, who finished second in their group in the first round of competition, before losing 2–1 in the quarter finals to Mali. Bangoura played again in the 2006 African Nations Cup, with a prominent role in the country's three group wins before the team was knocked out in the quarter finals by Senegal in a match which ended 3–2. He failed to turn up at Stoke City after the tournament, as he stayed in Guinea due to family problems.

== Career statistics ==
=== Club ===
Club	Season	League			FA Cup		League Cup		Total	
Club	Season	Division	Apps	Goals	Apps	Goals	Apps	Goals	Apps	Goals
Lokeren	2000–01	Belgian First Division	30	13	—		—		30	13
Lokeren	2001–02	Belgian First Division	26	12	—		—		26	12
Lokeren	2002–03	Belgian First Division	29	17	—		—		29	17
Lokeren	Total		85	42	—		—		85	42
Standard Liège	2003–04	Belgian First Division	20	5	—		—		20	5
Standard Liège	2004–05	Belgian First Division	30	15	—		—		30	15
Standard Liège	2005–06	Belgian First Division	3	1	—		—		3	1
Standard Liège	Total		53	21	—		—		53	21
Stoke City	2005–06	Championship	24	9	1	0	0	0	25	9
Stoke City	2006–07	Championship	4	0	0	0	0	0	4	0
Stoke City	Total		28	9	1	0	0	0	29	9
Brussels (loan)	2006–07	Belgian First Division	12	3	—		—		12	3
Boavista	2007–08	Primeira Liga	13	1	—		—		13	1
Cádiz (loan)	2007–08	Segunda División	10	1	—		—		10	1
Panserraikos	2008–09	Super League Greece	17	3	—		—		17	3
Panserraikos	2009–10	Beta Ethniki	15	5	—		—		15	5
Panserraikos	2010–11	Super League Greece	1	0	—		—		1	0
Panserraikos	2011–12	Football League	19	10	—		—		19	10
Panserraikos	2012–13	Football League	21	6	—		—		21	6
Panserraikos	Total		73	24	—		—		73	24
Career Total			274	101	1	0	0	0	275	101

=== International ===
National team	Year	Apps	Goals
Guinea	2000	2	0
Guinea	2001	2	1
Guinea	2002	2	0
Guinea	2003	4	4
Guinea	2004	4	0
Guinea	2005	4	2
Guinea	2006	3	1
Guinea	2007	1	0
Guinea	2009	3	1
Guinea	2013	2	0
Total		27	9
