= 2004–05 Belgian First Division =

102nd season of top-tier football in Belgium

Belgian First Division
- Season: 2004–05
- Champions: Club Brugge
- Relegated: Oostende; Mons
- Champions League: Club Brugge; Anderlecht
- UEFA Cup: Genk; Germinal Beerschot
- Matches: 306
- Goals: 845 (2.76 per match)
- Top goalscorer: Nenad Jestrović (18 goals)

The 2004–05 season of the Belgian First Division began on August 6, 2004 and ended on May 23, 2005. Club Brugge became champions on May 15, 2005 after a decisive game against long-time rivals Anderlecht. The season was full of suspense as the champions and the relegated teams were only known on the 33rd (on 34) matchday. Furthermore, the 3rd place (qualifying for UEFA Cup) had to be decided on a test-match, a fact that had not occurred recently.

== Promoted teams ==
Location of teams in Belgian First Division 2004–05

These teams were promoted from the second division at the start of the season:

- FC Brussels (second division champion)
- Oostende (playoff winner)

== Relegated teams ==
These teams were relegated to the second division at the end of the season:

- Oostende
- Mons

== Battle for the 1st place ==
As usual, the two giants (Sporting Anderlecht and Club Brugge) were occupying the first two places after 5 matches. Brugge was already 1st and actually stayed on top until the end. The Brussels side has indeed failed to show consistency under the management of Hugo Broos who was fired after a 0-0 draw at Gent. Under new coach (Franky Vercauteren), Anderlecht had a run of good form (after the initial 0-1 defeat against Oostende). Linked to the poor results of rivals Brugge, this situation led to a 6-point difference between the two clubs after 32 matches. The Brugge-Anderlecht game (33rd matchday) was thus decisive for both clubs. It ended with a 2-2 draw that was sufficient for the West Flemish.

Brugge title is due to its exceptional regularity against smaller teams as is shown on the following table (showing points gained by a top 4 team against the other top 4 teams) :

1. Anderlecht 6 13
2. Standard 6 8
3. Brugge 6 6
4. Genk 6 5

== Battle for Europe ==
As Anderlecht and Brugge rapidly ran away with the first two places, the battle for Europe was mainly consisted in the battle for UEFA Cup spots (or battle for the third place). Four teams were serious candidates: Standard, Genk, Charleroi and Gent. The latter two were soon dismissed. Before the last matchday, Standard was two points ahead of Genk but they lost their advantage after a 1-1 draw at Ostend while Genk earned a 3-1 win at Cercle Brugge. As both teams now had the same number of points and wins, a test-match had to be played (in two legs). Standard won the first match 3-1 but lost the away match 0-3 and lost the European ticket for next season.

== The relegation dog fight ==
After their poor early results, five teams were predicted to fight against relegation: Sint-Truiden, Mouscron and especially newcomers FC Brussels and Oostende along with Mons. Beveren joined the list after a very poor final run. Before the 33rd matchday, the table read:

12. Lierse 32 35
13. Sint-Truiden 32 33
14. Beveren 32 31
15. Mouscron 32 30
16. Brussels 32 30
17. Mons 32 26
18. Oostende 32 26

Lierse and Sint-Truiden were already saved. Mons and Oostende had to win or draw to maintain suspense but they finally both lost (2-0 respectively against Mouscron and at La Louvière).

== Final league table ==
Pos	Team	Pld	W	D	L	GF	GA	GD	Pts	Qualification or relegation
1	Club Brugge (C)	34	24	7	3	83	25	+58	79	Qualification to Champions League third qualifying round
2	Anderlecht	34	23	7	4	75	34	+41	76	Qualification to Champions League second qualifying round
3	Genk	34	21	7	6	59	37	+22	70	Qualification to UEFA Cup second qualifying round
4	Standard Liège	34	21	7	6	64	30	+34	70	
5	Charleroi	34	19	7	8	47	34	+13	64	Qualification to Intertoto Cup second round
6	Gent	34	18	5	11	46	36	+10	59	Qualification to Intertoto Cup first round
7	La Louvière	34	12	8	14	43	43	0	44	
8	Sporting Lokeren	34	11	11	12	36	38	−2	44	Qualification to Intertoto Cup first round
9	Germinal Beerschot	34	12	6	16	36	45	−9	42	Qualification to UEFA Cup first round
10	Lierse	34	12	5	17	57	60	−3	41	
11	Cercle Brugge	34	12	5	17	45	74	−29	41	
12	Westerlo	34	11	6	17	34	54	−20	39	
13	Mouscron	34	10	6	18	40	43	−3	36	
14	Sint-Truiden	34	10	6	18	40	58	−18	36	
15	Molenbeek Brussels Strombeek	34	10	3	21	32	60	−28	33	
16	Beveren	34	8	8	18	43	59	−16	32	
17	Oostende (R)	34	6	9	19	31	62	−31	27	Relegation to 2005–06 Belgian Second Division
18	Mons (R)	34	7	5	22	39	58	−19	26	Relegation to 2005–06 Belgian Second Division

(C) Champions; (R) Relegated

== Results ==
Home \ Away	AND	GBA	BEV	CER	CLU	CHA	GNK	GNT	LIE	LOK	LOU	BRU	MON	MOU	OST	STV	STA	WES
Anderlecht		3–0	5–2	5–2	2–1	3–0	4–2	2–0	5–1	2–0	2–1	3–0	2–1	2–0	0–1	2–1	3–2	4–0
Germinal Beerschot	0–1		3–1	2–3	0–1	0–1	3–1	0–0	2–2	1–2	1–1	2–0	2–0	3–1	4–0	3–1	1–0	1–0
Beveren	0–1	1–0		5–1	1–1	1–2	0–2	1–2	2–1	0–2	0–2	0–1	0–4	2–2	2–2	3–1	2–3	4–1
Cercle Brugge	1–3	2–1	1–1		1–2	0–4	1–3	2–1	2–2	2–2	2–2	1–2	2–0	1–0	2–0	5–1	1–3	0–0
Club Brugge	2–2	6–0	3–1	5–0		1–1	1–1	5–0	1–0	0–0	2–0	4–1	3–1	3–0	7–3	5–1	1–1	2–0
Charleroi	2–1	1–0	2–1	5–1	0–1		2–0	3–2	1–0	2–1	2–5	1–2	1–0	2–0	1–0	0–0	0–0	0–1
Genk	2–4	2–1	2–1	2–1	2–1	2–0		1–1	3–0	2–1	1–0	3–1	2–2	0–0	2–2	1–0	1–1	3–2
Gent	0–0	5–0	1–0	1–2	0–1	3–1	0–1		1–0	3–1	2–1	3–0	2–1	1–0	2–1	2–1	1–1	1–0
Lierse	1–1	2–0	1–3	2–0	0–2	1–1	1–5	3–2		2–0	7–0	5–1	4–1	0–1	3–1	0–1	1–1	3–0
Lokeren	2–2	0–1	1–1	4–0	0–2	1–1	1–3	0–1	0–2		1–0	1–0	0–0	1–1	1–0	4–3	0–0	3–1
La Louvière	1–1	1–1	3–0	2–1	0–2	0–0	2–0	0–1	3–2	0–0		1–0	4–0	3–1	2–0	1–0	0–1	1–2
Brussels	0–1	2–1	1–3	2–1	1–6	1–2	0–1	1–1	3–2	1–2	1–1		2–1	2–1	2–2	0–1	0–1	0–1
Mons	1–2	0–1	2–2	1–3	0–0	0–1	1–2	1–0	4–1	0–1	4–1	1–2		0–2	2–0	4–1	2–3	3–2
Mouscron	2–0	0–1	1–0	6–0	0–1	0–1	1–2	0–2	1–3	1–1	1–1	2–0	5–1		1–1	4–0	0–3	3–0
Oostende	1–3	0–0	1–1	0–1	1–2	1–2	1–3	1–2	2–3	0–2	2–1	1–0	1–0	1–0		1–0	1–1	3–3
Sint-Truiden	2–2	1–1	0–1	0–1	3–2	2–2	0–2	0–2	4–0	2–0	2–1	2–0	0–0	3–2	0–0		4–1	1–0
Standard Liège	1–0	3–0	3–0	4–0	1–4	1–2	1–0	3–0	4–1	1–0	1–0	1–3	2–0	2–0	5–0	4–1		2–0
Westerlo	2–2	1–0	1–1	1–2	1–3	2–1	0–0	2–1	2–1	1–1	0–2	1–0	2–1	0–1	2–0	2–1	1–3	

Legend: Blue = home team win; Yellow = draw; Red = away team win.

== Top goal scorers ==
Scorer	Goals	Team
(Serbia and Montenegro) Nenad Jestrović	18	Anderlecht
(Belgium) Kevin Vandenbergh	17	Genk
(Guinea) Sambégou Bangoura	15	Standard Liège
(Norway) Rune Lange	15	Club Brugge
(Nigeria) Mohammed Aliyu Datti	14	Mons
(Ivory Coast) Aruna Dindane	14	Anderlecht
(Ivory Coast) Moussa Sanogo	14	Beveren
(Australia) Archie Thompson	14	Lierse
(Poland) Marcin Żewłakow	14	Mouscron

== Awards ==
=== Individual awards ===
Award	Winner	Club
Belgian Professional Footballer of the Year	(Belgium) Vincent Kompany	Anderlecht
Belgian Young Footballer of the Year	(Belgium) Vincent Kompany	Anderlecht
Manager of the Year	(Belgium) Hugo Broos	Club Brugge

Team of the Season
Goalkeeper	(Belgium) Silvio Proto (La Louvière)			
Defenders	(Belgium) Vincent Kompany (Anderlecht)	(Belgium) Philippe Clement (Club Brugge)	(Czech Republic) David Rozehnal (Club Brugge)	(Belgium) Olivier Deschacht (Anderlecht)
Midfielders	(Slovenia) Nastja Čeh (Club Brugge)	(Belgium) Timmy Simons (Club Brugge)	(Portugal) Sérgio Conceição (Standard Liège)	(Belgium) Walter Baseggio (Anderlecht)
Forwards	(Serbia) Nenad Jestrovic (Anderlecht)	(Croatia) Boško Balaban (Club Brugge)		

== Attendances ==
No.	Club	Average attendance	Change	Highest
1	Club Brugge	24,432	3,0%	27,734
2	Anderlecht	23,689	-1,9%	25,693
3	Genk	22,650	-4,1%	24,128
4	Standard de Liège	16,882	0,0%	27,000
5	Charleroi	10,713	17,9%	19,710
6	Gent	7,744	-7,3%	10,840
7	Lierse	7,476	3,1%	10,800
8	STVV	7,471	-2,5%	12,000
9	Germinal Beerschot	7,278	-2,0%	10,500
10	Mouscron	6,722	-12,8%	10,000
11	Brussels	5,869	137,5%	15,266
12	Sporting Lokeren	5,712	2,5%	10,500
13	Westerlo	5,265	-0,3%	8,500
14	Cercle Brugge	5,156	1,0%	12,450
15	RAAL	4,816	12,0%	9,017
16	RAEC	4,665	1,8%	9,000
17	Beveren	4,382	-11,3%	7,500
18	Oostende	3,951	138,9%	10,000

== See also ==
- 2004-05 in Belgian football
