= 2002–03 Belgian First Division =

100th season of top-tier football in Belgium

Belgian First Division
- Season: 2002–03
- Champions: Club Brugge
- Relegated: Mechelen; Lommel
- Champions League: Club Brugge; Anderlecht
- UEFA Cup: Lokeren; La Louvière
- Matches: 306
- Goals: 868 (2.84 per match)
- Top goalscorer: Cédric Roussel; Wesley Sonck (22 each)

The 2002–03 season of the Jupiler League began on August 9, 2002, and ended on May 25, 2003. Club Brugge became champion.

== Promoted teams ==
Location of teams in Belgian First Division 2002–03

These teams were promoted from the second division at the start of the season:

- K.V. Mechelen (second division champion)
- R.A.E.C. Mons (playoff winner)

== Relegated teams ==
These teams were relegated to the second division at the end of the season:

- K.V. Mechelen
- K.F.C. Lommel S.K. (withdrew before the end of the season)

== Final league table ==
Pos	Team	Pld	W	D	L	GF	GA	GD	Pts	Qualification or relegation
1	Club Brugge (C)	32	25	4	3	96	33	+63	79	Qualification to Champions League third qualifying round
2	Anderlecht	32	23	2	7	72	33	+39	71	Qualification to Champions League second qualifying round
3	Sporting Lokeren	32	18	6	8	69	51	+18	60	Qualification to UEFA Cup qualifying round
4	Sint-Truiden	32	16	8	8	63	44	+19	56	Qualification to Intertoto Cup second round
5	Lierse	32	16	8	8	51	41	+10	56	Qualification to Intertoto Cup first round
6	Genk	32	16	7	9	73	52	+21	55	
7	Standard Liège	32	14	8	10	53	39	+14	50	
8	Gent	32	15	2	15	49	55	−6	47	
9	Mons	32	13	4	15	45	45	0	43	
10	Westerlo	32	12	4	16	39	46	−7	40	
11	Beveren	32	12	2	18	52	69	−17	38	
12	Antwerp	32	9	7	16	44	55	−11	34	
13	Mouscron	32	9	5	18	42	72	−30	32	
14	Germinal Beerschot	32	8	7	17	49	57	−8	31	
15	La Louvière	32	7	9	16	34	44	−10	30	Qualification to UEFA Cup first round
16	Charleroi	32	6	9	17	39	66	−27	27	
17	Mechelen (R)	32	4	6	22	18	86	−68	18	Relegation to 2003–04 Belgian Third Division (Note: Y.R. K.V. Mechelen were relegated to the Third Division after going into liquidation; they reformed as Geel Red KV Mechelen, starting the season on -9 points.)
18	Lommel (R)	0	0	0	0	0	0	0	0	Withdrew (Note: K.F.C. Lommel S.K. withdrew after 26 games as they only had 13 players remaining. All results were voided and the club was relegated to the Third Division after going into liquidation, where they merged with KVV Overpelt Fabriek to begin the 2003-04 season as KVSK United.)

(C) Champions; (R) Relegated

== Results ==
Home \ Away	AND	ANT	GBA	BEV	CLU	CHA	GNK	GNT	LIE	LOK	LOM	LOU	MEC	MON	MOU	STV	STA	WES
Anderlecht		4–1	4–0	7–1	5–1	2–0	1–1	2–2	1–2	2–0	2–1	1–0	4–1	2–1	6–3	2–0	2–1	0–2
Antwerp	2–1		5–3	3–1	2–2	3–1	2–4	1–4	2–2	1–2	FFT	2–1	2–0	0–1	3–1	1–3	1–1	1–2
Germinal Beerschot	1–2	1–1		2–1	1–3	1–1	2–1	2–1	1–2	0–1	3–0	2–0	2–2	4–0	0–2	3–2	0–1	1–1
Beveren	5–0	3–1	3–1		2–7	3–0	1–4	0–3	7–1	0–1	0–0	0–3	6–0	3–0	3–0	2–1	1–3	2–1
Club Brugge	2–1	1–0	1–1	3–0		1–2	4–0	1–0	3–0	5–0	3–0	3–0	4–0	4–2	5–0	1–1	4–2	3–0
Charleroi	1–3	1–1	1–6	0–0	2–3		0–0	1–2	0–1	4–3	FFT	1–1	3–0	2–1	5–0	2–2	3–3	1–0
Genk	0–1	2–0	5–2	4–0	0–3	3–0		3–1	5–2	2–3	4–1	1–0	9–0	2–0	5–4	2–2	1–5	1–1
Gent	0–2	0–0	1–0	2–1	1–4	2–1	2–0		1–3	2–3	3–1	3–2	2–0	2–1	2–0	3–0	0–5	3–2
Lierse	0–1	3–1	2–1	5–0	1–1	2–1	1–1	2–1		2–1	2–1	1–1	3–0	1–1	1–0	0–2	2–0	0–1
Lokeren	0–5	2–1	3–1	1–2	2–5	4–1	4–1	5–1	1–1		5–0	1–1	5–0	4–0	3–2	0–0	3–3	4–0
Lommel	FFT	0–2	2–1	3–2	FFT	1–1	1–3	FFT	1–2	2–0		0–1	4–1	0–1	FFT	1–3	1–0	5–1
La Louvière	1–2	1–1	1–1	2–1	1–2	2–2	2–2	0–1	0–3	2–4	1–0		1–1	1–0	2–0	1–2	0–2	0–0
Mechelen	0–2	0–2	2–0	0–2	0–8	1–0	2–6	1–0	0–2	2–3	5–1	0–1		0–0	3–2	0–0	1–1	0–4
Mons	1–2	3–0	2–1	4–1	1–2	4–1	1–2	0–1	2–1	0–0	FFT	1–3	2–0		2–0	3–0	1–0	2–1
Mouscron	1–0	1–0	1–6	0–0	0–4	6–0	3–3	2–1	1–1	1–1	2–0	1–0	3–1	0–5		1–2	0–1	0–4
Sint-Truiden	3–1	1–0	1–1	6–1	5–2	2–2	0–1	6–4	2–1	2–0	0–0	2–1	5–1	3–4	2–2		0–1	1–0
Standard Liège	0–2	1–3	2–1	2–0	1–2	3–0	0–1	4–1	1–1	1–2	4–0	1–0	0–0	0–0	0–3	2–2		3–0
Westerlo	0–2	2–1	2–1	2–0	0–2	1–1	3–1	1–0	1–2	1–3	1–2	0–3	2–0	2–0	1–2	0–3	2–3	

Legend: Blue = home team win; Yellow = draw; Red = away team win.

== Top goal scorers ==
Scorer	Goals	Team
(Belgium) Cédric Roussel	22	Mons
(Belgium) Wesley Sonck	22	Genk
(Serbia and Montenegro) Nenad Jestrović	20	Anderlecht
(Norway) Ole Martin Årst	19	Standard Liège
(Sierra Leone) Paul Kpaka	18	Germinal Beershot
(Guinea) Sambegou Bangoura	17	Lokeren
(Iceland) Arnar Grétarsson	17	Lokeren
(Belgium) Stein Huysegems	15	Lierse
(Rwanda) Désiré Mbonabucya	15	Sint-Truiden

== Attendances ==
No.	Club	Average attendance	Change	Highest
1	Genk	23,851	14,7%	24,749
2	Anderlecht	23,653	0,1%	26,516
3	Club Brugge	20,976	17,5%	27,000
4	Standard de Liège	14,743	15,8%	19,755
5	Charleroi	9,980	2,5%	14,367
6	Gent	8,733	-2,6%	11,023
7	Lierse	8,265	23,6%	12,300
8	Mouscron	8,182	-3,7%	11,145
9	STVV	7,912	8,5%	12,500
10	Germinal Beerschot	7,562	-10,0%	10,000
11	Antwerp	7,172	25,6%	16,500
12	Sporting Lokeren	6,218	17,8%	10,500
13	Mechelen	6,204	31,8%	8,500
14	RAEC	6,150	166,7%	8,500
15	Westerlo	5,618	5,5%	9,000
16	Lommel	5,462	-9,7%	10,000
17	RAAL	5,182	2,4%	8,000
18	Beveren	4,518	6,4%	7,000

== See also ==
- 2002–03 in Belgian football
