= List of Belgian Cup finals =

Belgian Cup finals

The Belgian Cup is a knockout competition for football clubs in Belgian football, organized by the Royal Belgian Football Association. It was first unofficially organized in 1908 as a tournament between teams representing the various Provinces of Belgium, with players from the various clubs reallocated into teams based on their province of origin, with the team representing West Flanders defeating the Antwerp team in the first edition final. The first club edition of the Belgian Cup occurred during the 1911–12 season.

The tournament is currently open to all clubs registered in the Belgian football league system, although clubs outside the top five levels, playing in the regional Belgian Provincial Leagues can only qualify through regional cup tournaments. The competition culminates at the end of the league season (usually in May) with the Belgian Cup Final, although in recent years it has sometimes taken place in March or April ahead of the end of season playoffs.

The vast majority of Belgian Cup Final matches have been in Brussels: most of these were played at the King Baudouin Stadium, which has been the location since 1996. The other venues used for the final before 1996 were the Stade Maurice Dufrasne (1994), the Constant Vanden Stock Stadium (1985, 1987, 1993 and 1995), Olympiastadion (1986 and 1992), the Stade Joseph Marien (1927 and 1935), the Stade du Vivier d'Oie (1914), the former Rue du Forest Stadium (1913) and the temporary pitch of Daring Club de Bruxelles located in Jette (1912).

As of 2026, the record for the most wins is held by Club Brugge with 12 titles. The cup has been won by the same team in two or more consecutive years on six occasions, with only Anderlecht winning consecutive finals more than once. The cup is currently held by Union Saint-Gilloise, who defeated Anderlecht 3–1 after extra time in the 2026 final.

== Results ==
Key to list of winners
| (R) | Replay |
| * | Match went to extra time |
| † | Match decided by a penalty shoot-out after extra time |
| ‡ | Winning team won the Double (league title and cup) |
| Italics | Team from outside the top level of Belgian football |

- The "Season" column refers to the season the competition was held, and wikilinks to the article about that season.
- The wikilinks in the "Score" column point to the article about that season's final game.

Belgian Cup finals
| Final No. | Season | Winners | Score | Runners–up | Venue | Attendance |
|---|---|---|---|---|---|---|
| 1st | 1911–12 | RC Bruxelles | 1–0 | RC Gand | Unnamed temporary pitch of Daring Club de Bruxelles | 600 |
| 2nd | 1912–13 | Union SG ‡ | 3–2 * | CS Brugeois | Rue du Forest Stadium | 900 |
| 3rd | 1913–14 | Union SG | 2–1 | FC Brugeois | Stade du Vivier d'Oie | 4,000 |
1914 to 1926: Not held
| 4th | 1926–27 | CS Brugeois ‡ | 2–1 | Tubantia | Dudenpark | 1,500 |
1927 to 1934: Not held
| 5th | 1934–35 | Daring Bruxelles | 3–2 | Lyra | Stade Joseph Marien | 5,000 |
1935 to 1953: Not held
| 6th | 1953–54 | Standard Liège | 3–1 | RC Mechelen | Heysel Stadium | 18,000 |
| 7th | 1954–55 | Antwerp | 4–0 | Waterschei | Heysel Stadium | 20,000 |
| 8th | 1955–56 | Tournai | 2–1 | Verviers | Heysel Stadium | 10,000 |
1956 to 1963: Not held
| 9th | 1963–64 | Gent | 4–2 * | Diest | Heysel Stadium | 6,000 |
| 10th | 1964–65 | Anderlecht ‡ | 3–2 * | Standard Liège | Heysel Stadium | 35,000 |
| 11th | 1965–66 | Standard Liège | 1–0 | Anderlecht | Heysel Stadium | 32,452 |
| 12th | 1966–67 | Standard Liège | 3–1 * | Mechelen | Heysel Stadium | 32,003 |
| 13th | 1967–68 | Club Brugge | 1–1 † (Note: Score was 1–1 after 90 minutes and extra time. Club Brugge won the penalty shoot-out 7–6.) | Beerschot | Heysel Stadium | 34,000 |
| 14th | 1968–69 | Lierse | 2–0 | Racing White | Heysel Stadium | 26,000 |
| 15th | 1969–70 | Club Brugge | 6–1 | Daring Bruxelles | Heysel Stadium | 42,000 |
| 16th | 1970–71 | Beerschot | 2–1 * | Sint-Truiden | Heysel Stadium | 37,715 |
| 17th | 1971–72 | Anderlecht ‡ | 1–0 | Standard Liège | Heysel Stadium | 51,303 |
| 18th | 1972–73 | Anderlecht | 2–1 | Standard Liège | Heysel Stadium | 43,900 |
| 19th | 1973–74 | Waregem | 4–1 | Tongeren | Heysel Stadium | 30,700 |
| 20th | 1974–75 | Anderlecht | 1–0 | Antwerp | Heysel Stadium | 47,700 |
| 21st | 1975–76 | Anderlecht | 4–0 | Lierse | Heysel Stadium | 40,000 |
| 22nd | 1976–77 | Club Brugge ‡ | 4–3 | Anderlecht | Heysel Stadium | 55,000 |
| 23rd | 1977–78 | Beveren | 2–0 | Charleroi | Heysel Stadium | 34,082 |
| 24th | 1978–79 | Beerschot | 1–0 | Club Brugge | Heysel Stadium | 42,000 |
| 25th | 1979–80 | Waterschei | 2–1 | Beveren | Heysel Stadium | 32,700 |
| 26th | 1980–81 | Standard Liège | 4–0 | Lokeren | Heysel Stadium | 46,035 |
| 27th | 1981–82 | Waterschei | 2–0 | Waregem | Heysel Stadium | 23,032 |
| 28th | 1982–83 | Beveren | 3–1 | Club Brugge | Heysel Stadium | 45,000 |
| 29th | 1983–84 | Gent | 2–0 | Standard Liège | Heysel Stadium | 35,000 |
| 30th | 1984–85 | Cercle Brugge | 1–1 † (Note: Score was 1–1 after 90 minutes and extra time. Cercle Brugge won the penalty shoot-out 5–4.) | Beveren | Constant Vanden Stock Stadium | |
| 31st | 1985–86 | Club Brugge | 3–0 | Cercle Brugge | Olympiastadion | 28,000 |
| 32nd | 1986–87 | Mechelen | 1–0 | RFC Liège | Constant Vanden Stock Stadium | 26,117 |
| 33rd | 1987–88 | Anderlecht | 2–0 | Standard Liège | Heysel Stadium | 35,000 |
| 34th | 1988–89 | Anderlecht | 2–0 | Standard Liège | Heysel Stadium | 32,300 |
| 35th | 1989–90 | RFC Liège | 2–1 | Germinal Ekeren | Heysel Stadium | |
| 36th | 1990–91 | Club Brugge | 3–1 | Mechelen | Heysel Stadium | 25,000 |
| 37th | 1991–92 | Antwerp | 2–2 † (Note: Score was 2–2 after 90 minutes and extra time. Antwerp won the penalty shoot-out 9–8.) | Mechelen | Olympiastadion | 20,000 |
| 38th | 1992–93 | Standard Liège | 2–0 | Charleroi | Constant Vanden Stock Stadium | |
| 39th | 1993–94 | Anderlecht ‡ | 2–0 | Club Brugge | Stade Maurice Dufrasne | 17,660 |
| 40th | 1994–95 | Club Brugge | 3–1 | Germinal Ekeren | Constant Vanden Stock Stadium | 18,500 |
| 41st | 1995–96 | Club Brugge ‡ | 2–1 | Cercle Brugge | King Baudouin Stadium | 30,000 |
| 42nd | 1996–97 | Germinal Ekeren | 4–2 * | Anderlecht | King Baudouin Stadium | 21,520 |
| 43rd | 1997–98 | Genk | 4–0 | Club Brugge | King Baudouin Stadium | 35,000 |
| 44th | 1998–99 | Lierse | 3–1 | Standard Liège | King Baudouin Stadium | 40,000 |
| 45th | 1999–2000 | Genk | 4–1 | Standard Liège | King Baudouin Stadium | 50,000 |
| 46th | 2000–01 | Westerlo | 1–0 | Lommel | King Baudouin Stadium | 20,000 |
| 47th | 2001–02 | Club Brugge | 3–1 | Excelsior Mouscron | King Baudouin Stadium | 32,881 |
| 48th | 2002–03 | La Louvière | 3–1 | Sint-Truiden | King Baudouin Stadium | 32,000 |
| 49th | 2003–04 | Club Brugge | 4–2 | Beveren | King Baudouin Stadium | 40,000 |
| 50th | 2004–05 | Germinal Beerschot | 2–1 | Club Brugge | King Baudouin Stadium | 40,000 |
| 51st | 2005–06 | Zulte Waregem | 2–1 | Excelsior Mouscron | King Baudouin Stadium | 24,000 |
| 52nd | 2006–07 | Club Brugge | 1–0 | Standard Liège | King Baudouin Stadium | 45,380 |
| 53rd | 2007–08 | Anderlecht | 3–2 | Gent | King Baudouin Stadium | 50,000 |
| 54th | 2008–09 | Genk | 2–0 | Mechelen | King Baudouin Stadium | 48,000 |
| 55th | 2009–10 | Gent | 3–0 | Cercle Brugge | King Baudouin Stadium | 36,000 |
| 56th | 2010–11 | Standard Liège | 2–0 | Westerlo | King Baudouin Stadium | 39,000 |
| 57th | 2011–12 | Lokeren | 1–0 | Kortrijk | King Baudouin Stadium | 35,000 |
| 58th | 2012–13 | Genk | 2–0 | Cercle Brugge | King Baudouin Stadium | 40,000 |
| 59th | 2013–14 | Lokeren | 1–0 | Zulte Waregem | King Baudouin Stadium | 40,000 |
| 60th | 2014–15 | Club Brugge | 2–1 | Anderlecht | King Baudouin Stadium | 45,000 |
| 61st | 2015–16 | Standard Liège | 2–1 | Club Brugge | King Baudouin Stadium | 44,379 |
| 62nd | 2016–17 | Zulte Waregem | 3–3 † (Note: Score was 3–3 after 90 minutes and extra time. Zulte Waregem won the penalty shoot-out 4–2.) | Oostende | King Baudouin Stadium | 35,000 |
| 63rd | 2017–18 | Standard Liège | 1–0 * | Genk | King Baudouin Stadium | 44,807 |
| 64th | 2018–19 | Mechelen | 2–1 | Gent | King Baudouin Stadium | 44,771 |
| 65th | 2019–20 | Antwerp | 1–0 | Club Brugge | King Baudouin Stadium | 0 (Note: The 2020 final was played behind closed doors due to the COVID-19 pandemic in Belgium.) |
| 66th | 2020–21 | Genk | 2–1 | Standard Liège | King Baudouin Stadium | 0 (Note: The 2021 final was played behind closed doors due to the COVID-19 pandemic in Belgium.) |
| 67th | 2021–22 | Gent | 0–0 † (Note: Score was 0–0 after 90 minutes and extra time. Gent won the penalty shoot–out 4–3.) | Anderlecht | King Baudouin Stadium | 42,500 |
| 68th | 2022–23 | Antwerp ‡ | 2–0 | Mechelen | King Baudouin Stadium | 42,000 |
| 69th | 2023–24 | Union SG | 1–0 | Antwerp | King Baudouin Stadium | 47,000 |
| 70th | 2024–25 | Club Brugge | 2–1 | Anderlecht | King Baudouin Stadium | 40,861 |
| 71st | 2025–26 | Union SG | 3–1 * | Anderlecht | King Baudouin Stadium | 45.000 |

== Results by team ==
Teams shown in italics and with red background are no longer in existence.

Results by team
| Club | Wins | First final won | Last final won | Runners-up | Last final lost | Total final appearances |
|---|---|---|---|---|---|---|
| Club Brugge | 12 | 1968 | 2025 | 8 | 2020 | 20 |
| Anderlecht | 9 | 1965 | 2008 | 7 | 2026 | 16 |
| Standard Liège | 8 | 1954 | 2018 | 10 | 2021 | 18 |
| Genk | 5 | 1998 | 2021 | 1 | 2018 | 6 |
| Gent | 4 | 1964 | 2022 | 2 | 2019 | 6 |
| Antwerp | 4 | 1955 | 2023 | 2 | 2024 | 6 |
| Union SG | 4 | 1913 | 2026 | 0 | — | 4 |
| Cercle Brugge | 2 | 1927 | 1985 | 5 | 2013 | 7 |
| KV Mechelen | 2 | 1987 | 2019 | 5 | 2023 | 7 |
| Beveren | 2 | 1978 | 1983 | 3 | 2004 | 5 |
| Germinal Beerschot (Note: Germinal Beerschot's total includes one win and two defeats under the earlier name of Germinal Ekeren, but does not include the results of Beerschot which are listed separately, as despite both referring to themselves as Beerschot these were distinct teams.) | 2 | 1997 | 2005 | 2 | 1995 | 4 |
| Zulte Waregem | 2 | 2006 | 2017 | 1 | 2014 | 3 |
| Lokeren | 2 | 2012 | 2014 | 1 | 1981 | 3 |
| Lierse | 2 | 1969 | 1999 | 1 | 1976 | 3 |
| Waterschei | 2 | 1980 | 1982 | 1 | 1955 | 3 |
| Beerschot (Note: Beerschot's total does not include the results of Germinal Beerschot which are listed separately, as despite both referring to themselves as Beerschot these were distinct teams.) | 2 | 1971 | 1979 | 1 | 1968 | 3 |
| Westerlo | 1 | 2001 | | 1 | 2011 | 2 |
| RFC Liège | 1 | 1990 | | 1 | 1987 | 2 |
| Waregem | 1 | 1974 | | 1 | 1982 | 2 |
| Daring Bruxelles | 1 | 1935 | | 1 | 1970 | 2 |
| La Louvière | 1 | 2003 | | 0 | — | 1 |
| Tournai | 1 | 1956 | | 0 | — | 1 |
| Racing Bruxelles | 1 | 1912 | | 0 | — | 1 |
| Excelsior Mouscron | 0 | — | | 2 | 2006 | 2 |
| Sint-Truiden | 0 | — | | 2 | 2003 | 2 |
| Charleroi | 0 | — | | 2 | 1993 | 2 |
| Oostende | 0 | — | | 1 | 2017 | 1 |
| Kortrijk | 0 | — | | 1 | 2012 | 1 |
| Lommel | 0 | — | | 1 | 2001 | 1 |
| Tongeren | 0 | — | | 1 | 1974 | 1 |
| Racing White | 0 | — | | 1 | 1969 | 1 |
| Diest | 0 | — | | 1 | 1964 | 1 |
| Verviers | 0 | — | | 1 | 1956 | 1 |
| KRC Mechelen | 0 | — | | 1 | 1954 | 1 |
| Lyra | 0 | — | | 1 | 1935 | 1 |
| Tubantia Borgerhout | 0 | — | | 1 | 1927 | 1 |
| RC Gand | 0 | — | | 1 | 1912 | 1 |

== Repeated final pairings ==
A total of 10 final pairings have been repeated on 17 occasions. 6 of these pairings (8 repeated occasions) have included Club Brugge as a finalist. Three of these pairings have been played more than twice. The most common final is Anderlecht v Standard Liège, having occurred on six occasions. This is also the only final pairing to have been played in consecutive seasons, and this is on three occasions. The longest span between repeated finals is Anderlecht v Club Brugge, occurring 48 years apart in 1977 and 2025.

Pairings shown in italics and with red background can no longer occur due to one or both teams no longer existing.

| Rank | Pairing | Occasions | Years | No. won by teams |
|---|---|---|---|---|
| 1 | Anderlecht v Standard Liège | 6 | 1965, 1966, 1972, 1973, 1988, 1989 | Anderlecht: 5 wins (1965, 1972, 1973, 1988, 1989); Standard Liège: 1 win (1966) |
| 2 | Anderlecht v Club Brugge | 4 | 1977, 1994, 2015, 2025 | Anderlecht: 1 win (1994); Club Brugge: 3 wins (1977, 2015, 2025) |
| 3 | Genk v Standard Liège | 3 | 2000, 2018, 2021 | Genk: 2 wins (2000, 2021); Standard Liège: 1 win (2018) |
| 4 | Anderlecht v Gent | 2 | 2008, 2022 | Anderlecht: 1 win (2008); Gent: 1 win (2022) |
| 4 | Antwerp v KV Mechelen | 2 | 1992, 2023 | Both won by Antwerp |
| 4 | Beerschot AC v Club Brugge (Note: Both matches between Beerschot AC and Club Brugge were played by the predecessor teams of Beerschot, namely, under the name Germinal Ekeren in 1995 and as Germinal Beerschot in 2005, the team eventually became known as Beerschot but has dissolved in 2013.) | 2 | 1995, 2005 | Beerschot: 1 win (2005); Club Brugge: 1 win (1995) |
| 4 | Beerschot VAC v Club Brugge | 2 | 1968, 1979 | Beerschot: 1 win (1979); Club Brugge: 1 win (1968) |
| 4 | Beveren v Club Brugge | 2 | 1983, 2004 | Beveren: 1 win (1983); Club Brugge: 1 win (2004) |
| 4 | Cercle Brugge v Club Brugge | 2 | 1986, 1996 | Both won by Club Brugge |
| 4 | Club Brugge v Standard Liège | 2 | 2007, 2016 | Club Brugge: 1 win (2007); Standard Liège: 1 win (2016) |
