= List of Belgian Cup winning managers =

This is a list of Belgian Cup winning football managers.

Urbain Braems won the tournament on no less than three occasions, as he led Anderlecht to success in the 1975 final and won both the 1978 and 1983 Belgian Cup Finals with Beveren; fourteen other managers have won the title on two occasions.

Only four managers have been able to win two consecutive cups, namely Hugo Broos, Raymond Goethals, Georg Keßler and Milorad Pavić. Eight managers have won the title with two sides: Urbain Braems, Johan Boskamp, Hans Croon, Ernst Happel, Ariël Jacobs, Georges Leekens, Walter Meeuws and Michel Preud'homme.

== Winning managers ==
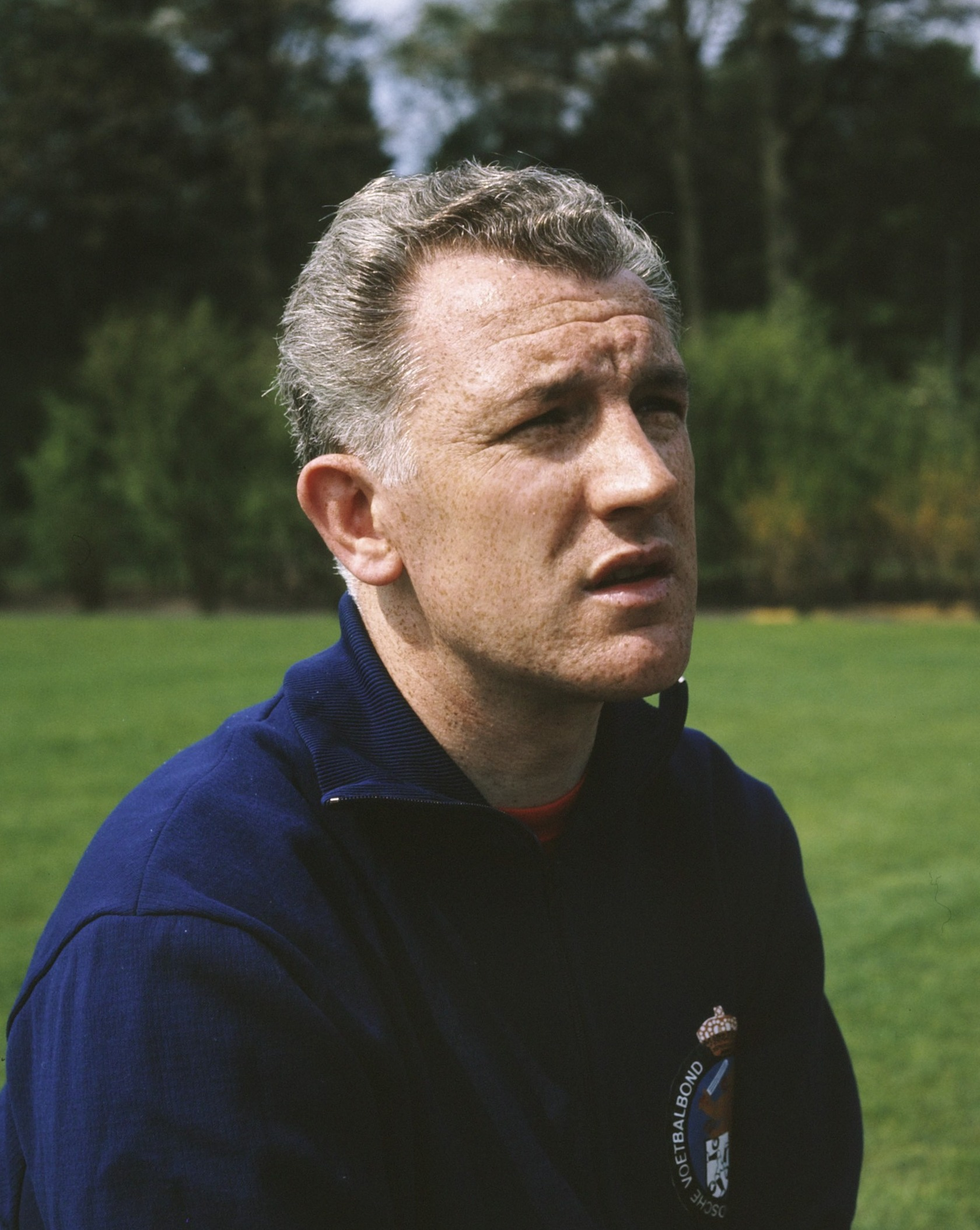
Georg Keßler, winning manager in 1972 and 1973

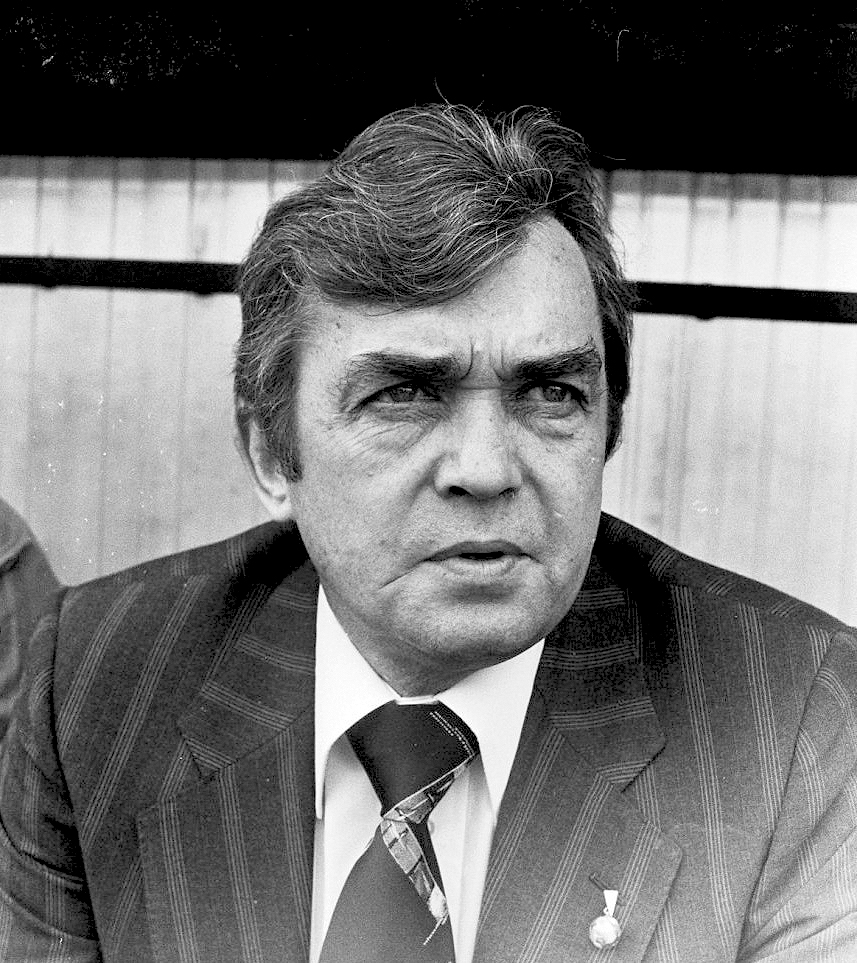
Ernst Happel, winning manager in 1977 and 1981

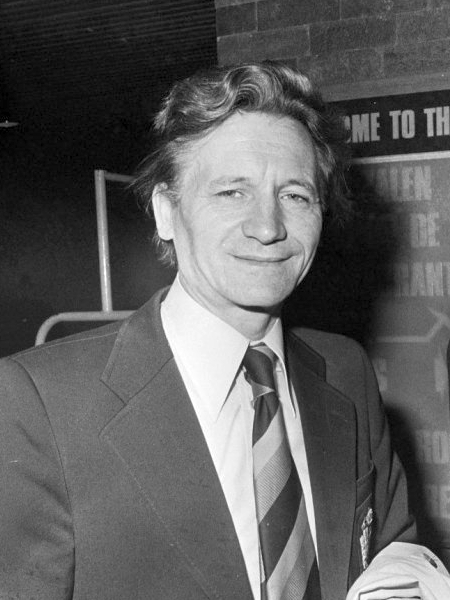
Raymond Goethals, winning manager in 1988 and 1989

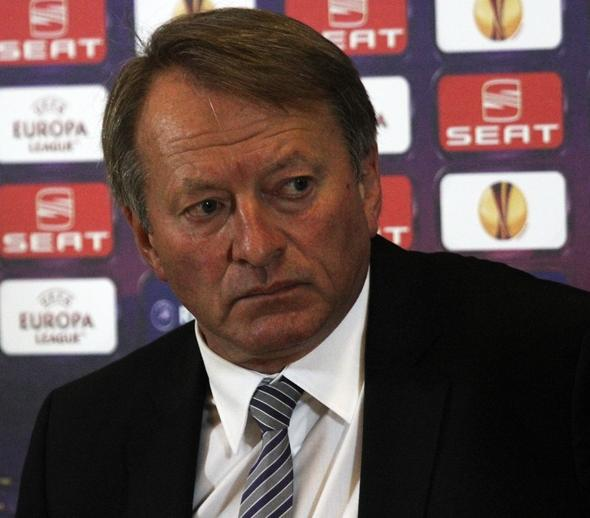
Ariël Jacobs, winning manager in 2003 and 2008

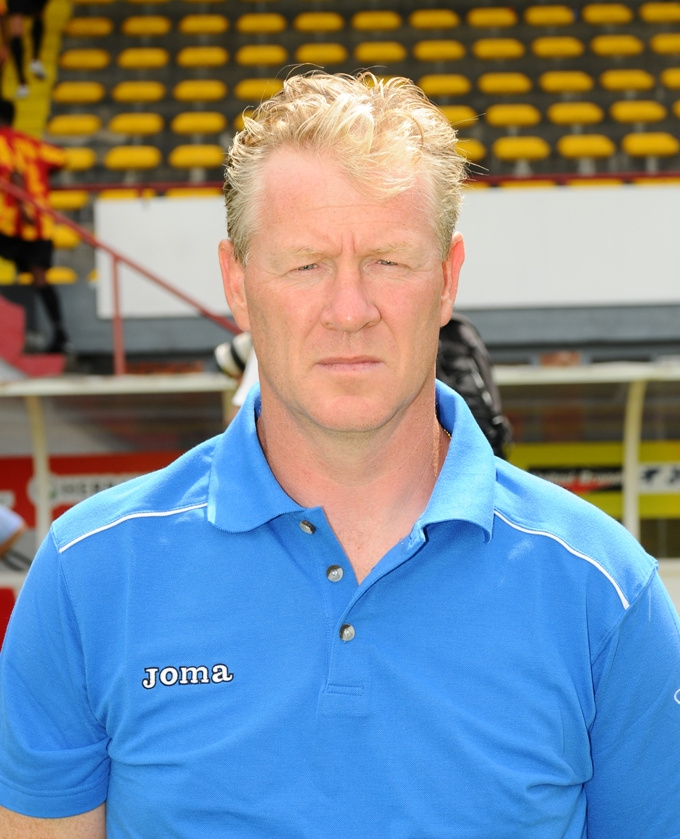
Peter Maes, winning manager in 2012 and 2014

Final	Manager	Nationality	Club	Ref
1912			Racing Club Bruxelles	
1913			Union SG	
1914			Union SG	
1927	Louis Saeys	Belgium	Cercle Brugge	
1935			Daring Club Bruxelles	
1954	André Riou	France	Standard Liège	
1955	Harry Game	England	Antwerp	
1956			Tournai	
1964	Louis Verstraeten	Belgium	Gent	
1965	Pierre Sinibaldi	France	Anderlecht	
1966	Milorad Pavić	Yugoslavia	Standard Liège	
1967	Milorad Pavić	Yugoslavia	Standard Liège	
1968	Norberto Höfling	Romania	Club Brugge	
1969	Staf Van den Bergh	Belgium	Lierse	
1970	Frans de Munck	Netherlands	Club Brugge	
1971	András Béres	Hungary	Beerschot	
1972	Georg Keßler	Germany	Anderlecht	
1973	Georg Keßler	Germany	Anderlecht	
1974	Hans Croon	Netherlands	Waregem	
1975	Urbain Braems	Belgium	Anderlecht	
1976	Hans Croon	Netherlands	Anderlecht	
1977	Ernst Happel	Austria	Club Brugge	
1978	Urbain Braems	Belgium	Beveren	
1979	George Knobel	Netherlands	Beerschot	
1980	Cor Brom	Netherlands	Waterschei	
1981	Ernst Happel	Austria	Standard Liège	
1982	Ernst Künnecke	Germany	Waterschei	
1983	Urbain Braems	Belgium	Beveren	
1984	Robert Goethals	Belgium	Gent	
1985	Georges Leekens	Belgium	Cercle Brugge	
1986	Henk Houwaart	Netherlands	Club Brugge	
1987	Aad de Mos	Netherlands	KV Mechelen	
1988	Raymond Goethals	Belgium	Anderlecht	
1989	Raymond Goethals	Belgium	Anderlecht	
1990	Robert Waseige	Belgium	RFC Liège	
1991	Georges Leekens	Belgium	Club Brugge	
1992	Walter Meeuws	Belgium	Antwerp	
1993	Arie Haan	Netherlands	Standard Liège	
1994	Johan Boskamp	Netherlands	Anderlecht	
1995	Hugo Broos	Belgium	Club Brugge	
1996	Hugo Broos	Belgium	Club Brugge	
1997	Herman Helleputte	Belgium	Germinal Ekeren	
1998	Aimé Anthuenis	Belgium	Genk	
1999	Walter Meeuws	Belgium	Lierse	
2000	Johan Boskamp	Netherlands	Genk	
2001	Jan Ceulemans	Belgium	Westerlo	
2002	Trond Sollied	Norway	Club Brugge	
2003	Ariël Jacobs	Belgium	La Louvière	
2004	Trond Sollied	Norway	Club Brugge	
2005	Marc Brys	Belgium	Germinal Beerschot	
2006	Francky Dury	Belgium	Zulte Waregem	
2007	Čedomir Janevski	Macedonia	Club Brugge	
2008	Ariël Jacobs	Belgium	Anderlecht	
2009	Pierre Denier	Belgium	Genk	
2010	Michel Preud'homme	Belgium	Gent	
2011	Dominique D'Onofrio	Belgium	Standard Liège	
2012	Peter Maes	Belgium	Lokeren	
2013	Mario Been	Netherlands	Genk	
2014	Peter Maes	Belgium	Lokeren	
2015	Michel Preud'homme	Belgium	Club Brugge	
2016	Yannick Ferrera	Belgium	Standard Liège	
2017	Francky Dury	Belgium	Zulte Waregem	
2018	Ricardo Sá Pinto	Portugal	Standard Liège	
2019	Wouter Vrancken	Belgium	KV Mechelen	
2020	Ivan Leko	Croatia	Antwerp	
2021	John van den Brom	Netherlands	Genk	
2022	Hein Vanhaezebrouck	Belgium	Gent	
2023	Mark van Bommel	Netherlands	Antwerp	
2024	Alexander Blessin	Germany	Union SG	
2025	Nicky Hayen	Belgium	Club Brugge	
2026	David Hubert	Belgium	Union SG	

=== By individual ===
Rank	Name	Winners	Club(s)	Winning years
1	(Belgium) Urbain Braems	3	Anderlecht, Beveren	1975, 1978, 1983
2	(Netherlands) Johan Boskamp	2	Anderlecht, Genk	1994, 2000
=	(Belgium) Hugo Broos	2	Club Brugge	1995, 1996
=	(Netherlands) Hans Croon	2	Anderlecht, Waregem	1974, 1976
=	(Belgium) Francky Dury	2	Zulte Waregem	2006, 2017
=	(Belgium) Raymond Goethals	2	Anderlecht	1988, 1989
=	(Austria) Ernst Happel	2	Anderlecht, Standard Liège	1977, 1981
=	(Belgium) Ariël Jacobs	2	Anderlecht, La Louvière	2003, 2008
=	(Germany) Georg Keßler	2	Anderlecht	1972, 1973
=	(Belgium) Georges Leekens	2	Cercle Brugge, Club Brugge	1985, 1991
=	(Belgium) Peter Maes	2	Lokeren	2012, 2014
=	(Belgium) Walter Meeuws	2	Antwerp, Lierse	1992, 1999
=	(Socialist Federal Republic of Yugoslavia) Milorad Pavić	2	Standard Liège	1966, 1967
=	(Belgium) Michel Preud'homme	2	Club Brugge, Gent	2010, 2015
=	(Norway) Trond Sollied	2	Club Brugge	2002, 2004

=== By nationality ===
Country	Managers	Total
Belgium	25	35
Netherlands	11	13
Germany	3	4
France	2	2
Yugoslavia	2	2
Austria	1	2
Norway	1	2
Croatia	1	1
England	1	1
Hungary	1	1
North Macedonia	1	1
Portugal	1	1
Romania	1	1
