= 1999 Belgian Cup final =

- Event: 1998–99 Belgian Cup
| Lierse | Standard Liège |
| 3 | 1 |
- Date: 30 May 1999
- Venue: King Baudouin Stadium, Brussels
- Referee: Fernand Meese

The 1999 Belgian Cup final, took place on 30 May 1999 between Lierse and Standard Liège. It was the 44th Belgian Cup final and was won by Lierse.

== Route to the final ==
| Lierse | | | | Standard Liège |
|---|---|---|---|---|---|---|
| Opponent | Result | Legs | Round | Opponent | Result | Legs |
| RWD Molenbeek (II) | 8–1 | 8–1 home | Sixth round | La Louvière (II) | 4–3 | 4–3 away |
| Denderhoutem (III) | 2–0 | 2–0 home | Seventh round | Eendracht Aalst | 3–0 | 3–0 away |
| Kortrijk | 6–0 | 6–0 away | Quarter-finals | Ingelmunster (III) | 3–1 | 3–1 away |
| Genk | 5–3 | 4–2 away, 1–1 home | Semi-finals | Lokeren | 5–0 | 2–0 away; 3–0 home |

== Match ==
=== Details ===
30 May 1999

| Lierse | 3–1 | Standard Liège |
|---|---|---|
| Spiteri 16'; Cavens 52', 89' | | Lukunku 63' |

King Baudouin Stadium, Brussels
Referee: Fernand Meese

| Lierse | Standard Liège |

| GK | (Netherlands) Stanley Menzo |
| RB | (Belgium) David Brocken (c) |
| CB | (Belgium) Carl Hoefkens |
| CB | (Belgium) Eric Van Meir |
| LB | (Belgium) Filip Daems | (substituted off) 84' |
| RM | (Belgium) Steve Laeremans |
| CM | (Belgium) Frank Leen |
| CM | (Poland) Tomasz Zdebel |
| LM | (Belgium) Jerry Poorters |
| RF | (Belgium) Jurgen Cavens |
| LF | (Australia) Joe Spiteri | (substituted off) 76' |
Substitutes:
| CB | (Georgia (country)) Gela Shekiladze | (substituted on) 84' |
| CF | (Belgium) Robby Van de Weyer | (substituted on) 76' |
Manager:
(Belgium) Walter Meeuws

| GK | (Croatia) Vedran Runje |
| RB | (Belgium) Didier Ernst | (yellow card) (yellow-red card) 88' |
| CB | (Brazil) André Cruz |
| CB | (Nigeria) Rabiu Afolabi |
| LB | (Belgium) Pascal Renier |
| RM | (Belgium) Gauthier Remacle | | (substituted off) 60' |
| CM | (Belgium) Bernd Thijs | | (substituted off) 75' |
| CM | (Luxembourg) Guy Hellers |
| LM | (Portugal) António Folha |
| CF | (Belgium) Mbo Mpenza |
| CF | (Democratic Republic of the Congo) Ali Lukunku | | (substituted off) 77' |
Substitutes:
| CF | (Belgium) Manu Godfroid | | (substituted on) 77' |
| CM | (Belgium) Dimitri de Condé | | (substituted on) 60' |
| CB | (Ghana) George Blay | | (substituted on) 75' |
Manager:
(Croatia) Tomislav Ivić

Match rules

- 90 minutes.
- 30 minutes of extra time if necessary.
- Penalty shoot-out if scores still level.
- Seven named substitutes.
- Maximum of three substitutions.
