= Kris Temmerman =

Belgian footballer

Personal information
- Date of birth: 2 February 1973 (age 53)
- Height: 1.79 m (5 ft 10 in)
- Position: Midfielder

Senior career*
Years	Team	Apps	(Gls)
2001–2002	RWDM		
1991–2001	Eendracht Aalst		
2002–2004	Denderleeuw		
2004–2007	Verbroedering Meldert		

International career
1995	Belgium U21		
- * Club domestic league appearances and goals

Kris Temmerman (born 2 February 1973) is a Belgian football midfielder.
