= Collins Fai =

Cameroonian footballer (born 1992)

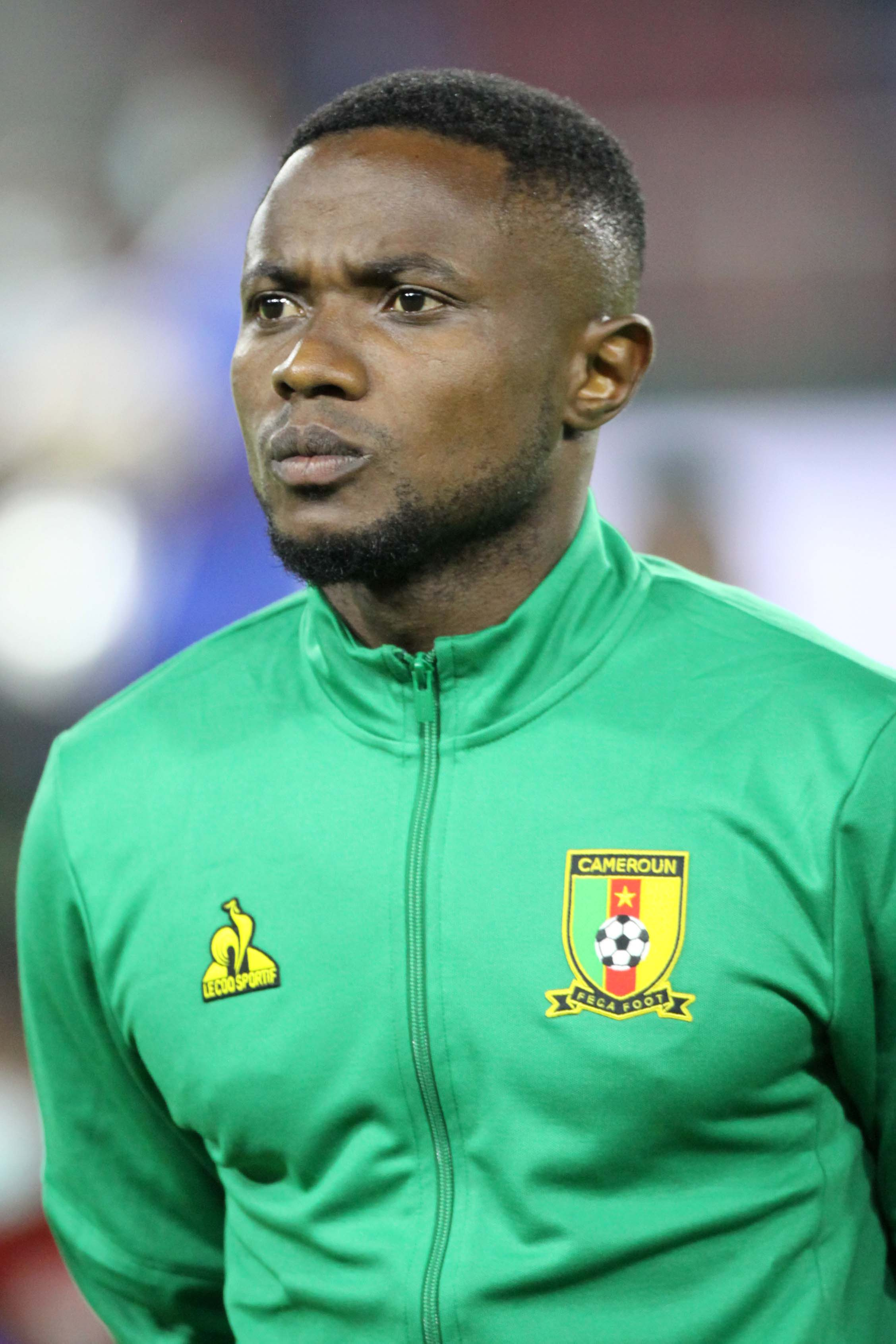
- Fai with Cameroon at the 2021 Africa Cup of Nations

Personal information
- Full name: Collins Ngoran Suiru Fai
- Date of birth: 13 August 1992 (age 34)
- Place of birth: Bamenda, Cameroon
- Height: 1.65 m (5 ft 5 in)
- Positions: Right back; left back

Youth career
- 2005–2011: FC Bamenda

Senior career*
Years	Team	Apps	(Gls)
2011–2013	Union Douala	40	(0)
2013	→ NQSA (loan)	6	(1)
2013–2016	Dinamo București	56	(0)
2016–2022	Standard Liège	125	(3)
2022–2023	Al-Tai	34	(0)
2023–2024	Radnički Niš	7	(0)
2025	Sloboda Tuzla	6	(0)

International career^{‡}
- Cameroon U21
- Cameroon U23
2012–2023	Cameroon	56	(0)
Medal record
Men's football
Representing Cameroon
Africa Cup of Nations
Winner	2017 Gabon
Third place	2021 Cameroon
- * Club domestic league appearances and goals as of 27 June 2025 ‡ National team caps and goals as of 7 April 2024

Collins Ngoran Fai (born 13 August 1992) is a Cameroonian professional footballer who plays for the Cameroon national team. Mainly a right back, he can also operate as a left back.

== Early life ==
Collins Fai was born on 13 August 1992 in Bamenda, a city in the English-speaking part of Cameroon. He spent his entire youth career at local FC Bamenda.

== Club career ==
=== Union Douala and NQSA ===
Fai joined the Cameroonian top team Union Douala in 2011, aged 19. He played 18 matches during the 2011–12 season to help the team win the title. In 2013, he went to play on loan for NQSA.

=== Dinamo București ===
In 2013, Fai began playing European football when he signed with Romanian club Dinamo București. He made his Liga I debut on 19 July 2013, when coach Gheorghe Mulțescu sent him in the 72nd minute to replace Steliano Filip in a 2–0 away loss to ACS Poli Timișoara. In November 2013, Fai suffered a rupture of the lateral collateral ligament in his left knee during a 2–1 loss to Astra Giurgiu. After more than seven months of absence from the field, he played again on 10 May 2014 in a 1–1 draw against Gaz Metan Mediaș. During the first half of the 2015–16 season, Fai was teammates with compatriots Marcel Essombé, Antonio Ghomsi and Patrice Feussi.

=== Standard Liège ===
In January 2016, Fai was transferred from Dinamo to Standard Liège for a €150,000 fee. He made his Belgian Pro League debut on 20 February 2016 in a 3–0 victory against Charleroi, managed by Yannick Ferrera. Fai played the full 90 minutes under Ferrera in the 2016 Belgian Cup final, helping Standard to a 2–1 victory against Club Brugge. He scored his first league goal, which proved to be the winner, in a 3–2 win over Oostende on 11 March 2018. Six days later, Fai played the entire match with Ricardo Sá Pinto coaching the side as Standard defeated Genk 1–0 in extra time to win the 2018 Belgian Cup final. During his years at Standard, Fai made 23 appearances in European competitions, of which 18 matches were in the Europa League group stage across four seasons, including victories against Panathinaikos, Sevilla, Eintracht Frankfurt and Lech Poznań.

=== Late career ===
On 29 January 2022, Fai joined Saudi Arabian club Al-Tai, which paid a €300,000 transfer fee to Standard. He made his Saudi Pro League debut on 12 February 2022, when coach José Luis Sierra sent him at halftime to replace Abdullah Hassoun in a 3–1 home victory against Al Batin. In December 2023, Fai went to play for Radnički Niš. He debuted in the Serbian SuperLiga on 11 February 2024, playing as a starter before coach Nikola Trajković replaced him with Filip Frei in the 3–2 loss to Radnički 1923. In February 2025, Fai signed a contract with Bosnian side Sloboda Tuzla. He made his league debut on 18 April under coach Denis Karić in a 3–2 loss to Radnik Bijeljina. He made six appearances until the end of the season but could not help the club avoid relegation.

== International career ==
Fai made his debut for Cameroon under coach Jean-Paul Akono on 16 November 2012 in a 0–0 friendly draw against Indonesia. Coach Hugo Broos selected him in the squad for the 2017 Africa Cup of Nations, using him in five matches, as the team reached the final, where Fai played the entire match in the 2–1 victory against Egypt. Subsequently, he played under Broos in all three games during the 2017 Confederations Cup which were a draw against Australia and losses to Chile and Germany, as his side failed to progress from their group.

During the 2019 Africa Cup of Nations, Fai played three matches under coach Clarence Seedorf, as Cameroon reached the round of 16 where they were defeated 3–2 by Nigeria. Afterwards, he played seven games in the 2021 Africa Cup of Nations under coach Toni Conceição to help the team reach the semifinals, where they lost to Egypt. He also helped Cameroon qualify for the 2022 World Cup. There, he played under coach Rigobert Song in the 1–0 loss to Switzerland, the 3–3 draw against Serbia, and the 1–0 win over Brazil, but they did not get past the group stage. Fai's last appearance for the national team took place on 10 June 2023 in a 2–2 friendly draw against Mexico, totaling 56 matches for The Indomitable Lions.

== Career statistics ==
=== Club ===
Appearances and goals by club, season and competition
Club	Season	League			National Cup		League Cup		Continental		Other		Total	
Club	Season	Division	Apps	Goals	Apps	Goals	Apps	Goals	Apps	Goals	Apps	Goals	Apps	Goals
Dinamo București	2013–14	Liga I	11	0	1	0	—		—		—		12	0
Dinamo București	2014–15	Liga I	24	0	1	0	3	0	—		—		28	0
Dinamo București	2015–16	Liga I	21	0	3	0	2	0	—		—		26	0
Dinamo București	Total		56	0	5	0	5	0	—		—		66	0
Standard Liège	2015–16	Belgian Pro League	7	0	1	0	—		—		—		8	0
Standard Liège	2016–17	Belgian First Division A	18	0	0	0	—		5	0	1	0	24	0
Standard Liège	2017–18	Belgian First Division A	32	1	6	0	—		—		—		38	1
Standard Liège	2018–19	Belgian First Division A	30	1	0	0	—		7	0	1	0	38	1
Standard Liège	2019–20	Belgian First Division A	8	0	2	1	—		3	0	—		13	1
Standard Liège	2020–21	Belgian First Division A	19	0	1	0	—		8	0	—		28	0
Standard Liège	2021–22	Belgian First Division A	11	1	2	0	—		—		—		13	1
Standard Liège	Total		125	3	12	1	—		23	0	2	0	162	4
Al-Tai	2021–22	Saudi Pro League	9	0	0	0	—		—		—		9	0
Al-Tai	2022–23	Saudi Pro League	25	0	0	0	—		—		—		25	0
Al-Tai	Total		34	0	0	0	—		—		—		34	0
Radnički Niš	2023–24	Serbian SuperLiga	7	0	0	0	—		—		0	0	7	0
Sloboda Tuzla	2024–25	Premier League of Bosnia and Herzegovina	6	0	0	0	—		—		—		6	0
Career total			228	3	17	1	5	0	23	0	2	0	275	4

=== International ===
Appearances and goals by national team and year
National team	Year	Apps	Goals
Cameroon	2012	1	0
Cameroon	2013	0	0
Cameroon	2014	0	0
Cameroon	2015	1	0
Cameroon	2016	1	0
Cameroon	2017	15	0
Cameroon	2018	6	0
Cameroon	2019	9	0
Cameroon	2020	1	0
Cameroon	2021	6	0
Cameroon	2022	15	0
Cameroon	2023	1	0
Total		56	0

== Honours ==
Union Douala

- Cameroon Premiere Division: 2011–12

Standard Liège

- Belgian Cup: 2015–16, 2017–18

Cameroon

- Africa Cup of Nations: 2017; third place: 2022
