= 1997 Belgian Cup final =

- Event: 1996–97 Belgian Cup
Germinal Ekeren	Anderlecht
4	2
- After extra time
- Date: 1 June 1997
- Venue: King Baudouin Stadium, Brussels
- Referee: Marnix Sandra
- Attendance: 21,520

The 1998 Belgian Cup final, took place on 1 June 1997 between Germinal Ekeren and Anderlecht. It was the 42nd Belgian Cup final. Germinal Ekeren came back from a 0-2 deficit to force extra time and eventually came out 4-2 winners.

== Route to the final ==
Germinal Ekeren				Anderlecht
Opponent	Result	Legs	Round	Opponent	Result	Legs
Verbroedering Geel (II)	4–0	4–0 home	Sixth round	Oostende (II)	4–1	4–1 home
Lokeren	4–3 (a.e.t.)	4–3 (a.e.t.) home	Seventh round	Poederlee (III)	6–0	6–0 home
Standard Liège	1–1	1–1 away	Quarter-finals	Gent	3–1	3–1 away
Standard Liège	3–0	3–0 home	Quarter-finals replay
Eendracht Aalst	3–3 (away goals)	0–0 home, 3–3 away	Semi-finals	Tielen (II)	4–2	1–0 away; 3–2 home

== Match ==
=== Details ===
1 June 1997
16:00

Germinal Ekeren	4–2 (a.e.t.)	Anderlecht
Johnson 65' (o.g.); Kinet 85'; Radzinski 93'; Hofmans 96'		Iachtchouk 32'; Johnson 57'

King Baudouin Stadium, Brussels
Attendance: 21,520
Referee: Marnix Sandra

Germinal Ekeren	Anderlecht

GK	1	(Belgium) Philippe Vande Walle (c)
RB	7	(Belgium) Rudy Janssens
CB	6	(Belgium) Mike Verstraeten
CB	8	(Hungary) Flórián Urbán
CB	2	(Belgium) Bernard Wégria		(substituted off) 56'
LB	9	(Belgium) Didier Dheedene
CM	15	(Belgium) Marc Schaessens		(substituted off) 80'
CM	10	(Belgium) Gunther Hofmans
CM	14	(Belgium) Christophe Kinet
CF	12	(Netherlands) Edwin van Ankeren		(substituted off) 46'
CF	13	(Canada) Tomasz Radzinski	Booked
Substitutes:
CF	11	(Belgium) Alex Czerniatynski		(substituted on) 80'
CB	5	(Hungary) Ervin Kovács		(substituted on) 56'
CM	17	(Federal Republic of Yugoslavia) Cvijan Milošević		(substituted on) 46'
Manager:
(Belgium) Herman Helleputte

GK	1	(Belgium) Geert De Vlieger
RB	12	(Belgium) Olivier Doll
CB	18	(Bosnia and Herzegovina) Suvad Katana
CB	14	(Ghana) Samuel Johnson		(substituted off) 84'
LB	4	(Nigeria) Celestine Babayaro
RM	11	(Belgium) Danny Boffin
CM	10	(Sweden) Pär Zetterberg (c)		(substituted off) 63'
CM	5	(Belgium) Johan Walem
LM	2	(Romania) Tibor Selymes	Booked
RF	22	(Ukraine) Oleg Iachtchouk
LF	13	(Belgium) Bruno Versavel		(substituted off) 46'
Substitutes:
RB	30	(Belgium) Stéphane Stassin		(substituted on) 46'
CM	28	(Belgium) Walter Baseggio		(substituted on) 63'
CF	8	(Ghana) Yaw Preko		(substituted on) 84'
Manager:
(Netherlands) Johan Boskamp

Match rules

- 90 minutes.
- 30 minutes of extra time if necessary.
- Penalty shoot-out if scores still level.
- Seven named substitutes.
- Maximum of three substitutions.
