= Ervin Kovács =

Hungarian footballer (born 1967)

Personal information
- Full name: Ervin Kovács
- Date of birth: 24 January 1967 (age 59)
- Place of birth: Hungary
- Height: 1.82 m (6 ft 0 in)
- Position: Defender

Senior career*
| Years | Team | Apps | (Gls) |
| 1986–1990 | Újpest FC | | |
| 1990–1993 | Budapest Honvéd FC | 79 | (15) |
| 1993–2000 | K.F.C. Germinal Beerschot | 122 | (11) |

International career
| 1987–1995 | Hungary | 24 | (1) |
- * Club domestic league appearances and goals

Ervin Kovács (born 24 January 1967) is a Hungarian former football player.

== FIFA Youth World Cup ==
In 1985, Kovács was a member of the Hungarian Squad that participated in the FIFA Under-20 World Cup.

He's now trainer of Maria Ter-Heide, a club in Belgium.

== Honours ==
Germinal Ekeren

- Belgian Cup: 1996–97
