= Bernd Thijs =

Belgian footballer (born 1978)

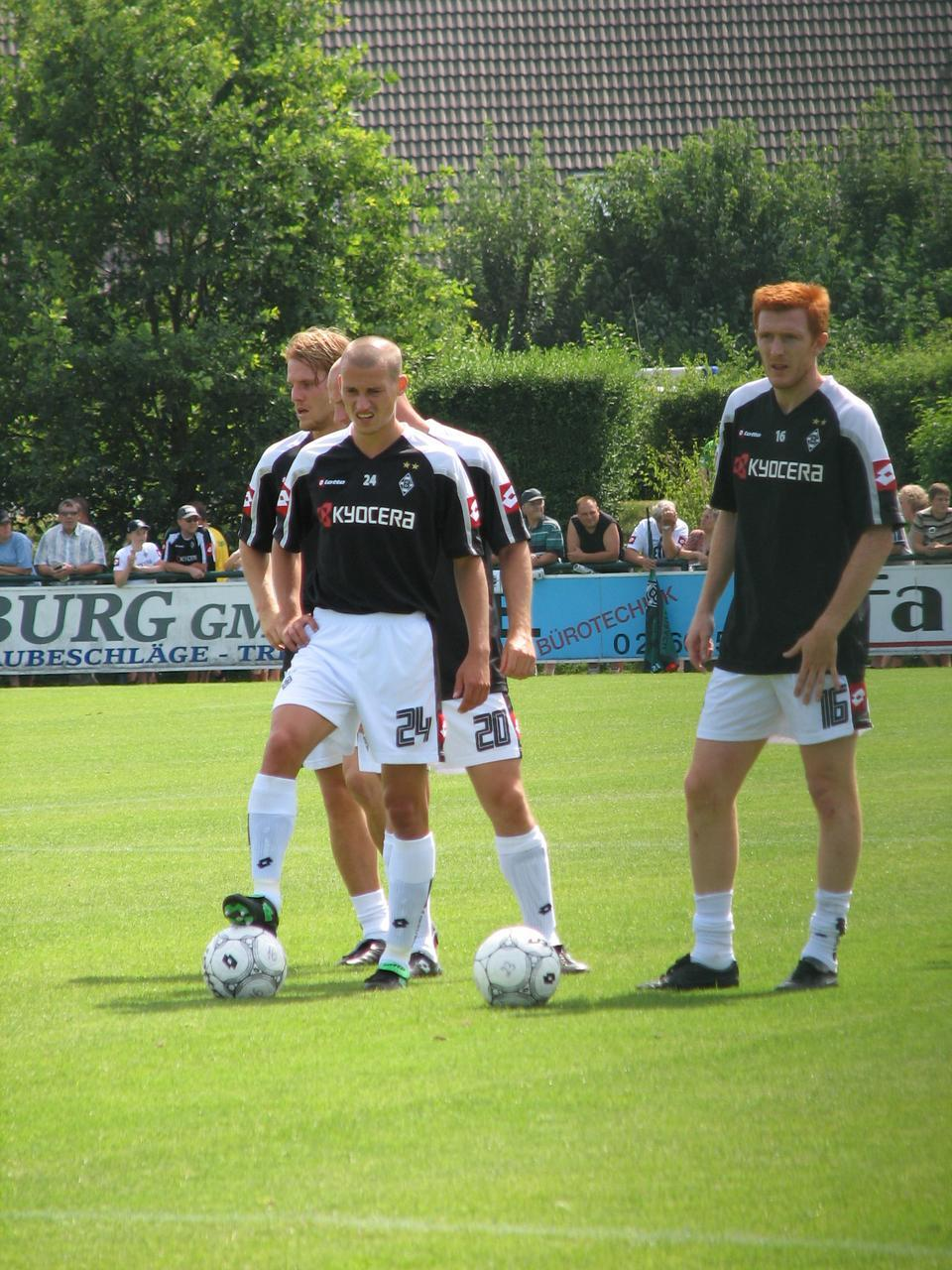

Personal information
- Date of birth: 28 June 1978 (age 48)
- Place of birth: Hasselt, Belgium
- Height: 1.86 m (6 ft 1 in)
- Position: Defensive midfielder

Senior career*
Years	Team	Apps	(Gls)
1995–2000	Standard Liège	102	(15)
2000–2004	Racing Genk	113	(35)
2004	Trabzonspor	11	(0)
2005–2007	Borussia Mönchengladbach	44	(0)
2007–2014	K.A.A. Gent	137	(27)
Total		407	(77)

International career
1993–1994	Belgium U16	4	(0)
1994	Belgium U17	1	(0)
1995–1996	Belgium U18	5	(1)
1995	Belgium U19	5	(0)
1999	Belgium U21	3	(0)
2002–2010	Belgium	6	(0)
- * Club domestic league appearances and goals

Bernd Thijs (Dutch pronunciation: [ˈbɛr(ə)n ˈtɛis]; born 28 June 1978) is a Belgian former footballer who played as a midfielder. His former clubs include Borussia Mönchengladbach, Standard Liège, Genk, KAA Gent and Trabzonspor. Thijs played five times with Belgium and was in the team for the 2002 World Cup.

Thijs is well known because of his sober style, his ballhandling with both feet and his targeted long shots. He usually played as a defensive midfielder, but was also capable of playing one row further up front. Sometimes he was also posted (as an emergency solution) in defense. At Gent, he was the captain of the team.

== Honours ==
Standard Liège

- Belgian Cup: runner-up 1998–1999, 1999–2000
- UEFA Intertoto Cup: runner-up 1996

RC Genk

- Belgian First Division: 2001–02

K.A.A. Gent

- Belgian Cup: 2009–10

Belgium

- FIFA Fair Play Trophy: 2002 World Cup

Individual

- Best Gent-Player of the Season: 2011–12
