= Trond Sollied =

Norwegian footballer and manager (born 1959)

Personal information
- Full name: Trond Johan Sollied
- Date of birth: 29 April 1959 (age 67)
- Place of birth: Mo i Rana, Norway
- Position: Defender

Senior career*
Years	Team	Apps	(Gls)
1976–1981	Mo	?	(?)
1982–1984	Vålerenga	63	(9)
1985–1991	Rosenborg	133	(12)
1992–1993	Bodø/Glimt	66	(1)
Total		262	(22)

International career
1985–1987	Norway	15	(1)

Managerial career
- 1992–1996: Bodø/Glimt
- 1997: Rosenborg (assistant)
- 1998: Rosenborg
- 1999–2000: Gent
- 2000–2005: Club Brugge
- 2005–2006: Olympiacos
- 2007–2008: Gent
- 2008–2009: Heerenveen
- 2010: Al-Ahli Jeddah
- 2011: Lierse
- 2011–2012: Gent
- 2013: Elazığspor
- 2018–2019: Sporting Lokeren
- * Club domestic league appearances and goals

Trond Johan Sollied (born 29 April 1959) is a Norwegian football manager and former player. He last managed Lokeren.

During his playing career, Sollied was a defender who won the Norwegian top flight five times. He also played for Norway's national team.

He began his managerial career with Bodø/Glimt, and has also been in charge of Rosenborg, Gent (on three occasions), Club Brugge, Olympiacos, Heerenveen, Al-Ahli, Lierse and Elazığspor. As of 2012, teams under his leadership have won 12 titles.

== Playing career ==
During his career as an active player, Sollied played for Mo IL, Vålerenga, Rosenborg and finally Bodø/Glimt as player-manager. He earned fifteen caps for the Norwegian national team, scoring one goal.

== Managerial career ==
He has education from the Norwegian School of Sport Sciences. Sollied started his career as a manager in 1992 at Bodø/Glimt where he was player/manager in the 1. divisjon (second tier). Sollied and Bodø/Glimt won the league, and were thus promoted to the Tippeligaen. In 1993, Bodø/Glimt, as a newly promoted team, won silver in the Tippeligaen as well as winning the Norwegian Cup. After that season, Sollied retired as player and focused on the coaching job. Bodø/Glimt also finished third in the top division in 1995, and lost the cup final against Tromsø in 1996.

Sollied was dismissed from Bodø/Glimt after a disagreement with the players and the club board. He went on to Rosenborg where he served as the assistant manager under legendary coach Nils Arne Eggen in the 1997 season. That year Rosenborg won the championship. During the 1998 season Eggen took a year off, placing Sollied in the manager seat. With him in charge, Rosenborg – once again – won the league and qualified for the UEFA Champions League.

In 1999, Sollied wanted a new challenge and therefore left the Norwegian League to try his luck in the Belgian League. His first team there was Gent. In 2000, he was offered a job at Club Brugge and stayed there until 2005. In six seasons, Sollied won everything: two championships (2003 and 2005), two cups (2002, 2004) and two Supercups (2002, 2004).

After the Norwegian national coach Nils Johan Semb retired in 2003, Sollied was mentioned as a replacement, but Sollied stated that he was only interested if he could combine the national team with his club position. This was not accepted by the Norwegian Football Association and Åge Hareide, Rosenborg coach at that time, became the new national manager.

In 2005, one year before the end of Sollied's contract with Club Brugge, a video message was leaked to the Belgian press, in which Sollied stated that he left Brugge for Olympiacos. Sollied disputed that this video was released without his permission. It was only meant to be published after he had signed a contract, which was not yet the case according to him. In Belgium, this affair was seen as a trick to force Brugge to suspend his contract, to prevent Olympiacos from paying a hefty compensation. In a press release, Club Brugge stated that they had taken note of Sollied's decision to suspend his contract. Sollied was officially presented by Olympiacos chairman Socrates Kokkalis as the club's new manager. In his debut season, he won the league title and the Greek Cup, and was ranked ninth in Europe on UEFA's list of top coaches in 2006. He also achieved winning the league title in three different countries. In December 2006, after two disappointing Champions League seasons, with Olympiakos finishing fourth (last) at group stage on both occasions, chairman Kokkalis decided to sack Sollied, despite the club being at the top of the table of Super League Greece. Former Skoda Xanthi manager, Takis Lemonis, was his replacement, returning to the club after 4 years.

In June 2007, Gent confirmed the return (after seven years) of Sollied as club manager. He led the team to the Belgian cup final in 2008. On 15 March 2008, it was confirmed that Sollied had signed a two-year deal with Dutch club Heerenveen. As per 9 December 2008, the press stated that Sollied was a strong candidate to coach the national Norwegian team. On 31 August 2009, Heerenveen announced Sollied's dismissal.

On 19 November 2009, MKE Ankaragücü made an official statement that they hired the Norwegian manager however Sollied publicly stated that he has not signed a contract with the Turkish club. Instead he signed for Al-Ahli, where he was fired after only three matches in 2010. On 3 January 2011, Sollied signed a contract with the Belgian First Division-team Lierse to save the club from relegation. With one point against his old club, Club Brugge, in the decisive round, Lierse was saved from relegation. On 6 June 2011, he announced that he had signed a contract in Gent once again, the third time in his career. He got fired from Gent on 23 October 2012, with the team positioned 7th in the league.

In June 2013, he was signed as manager for the Turkish Süper Lig side Elazığspor. With the team positioned in 16th place after nine matches, and five straight losses, Sollied resigned as manager in October 2013.

=== Managerial style ===
His preferred formation, 4–3–3, is not changed under almost any circumstances. He uses a zonal four-man defence, a holding midfielder behind two central midfielders, two wingers left and right and finally a powerful striker. He loves and adopts attacking football in all of his teams. This style is similar to that of Nils Arne Eggen.

== Honours ==
=== Manager ===
Bodø/Glimt

- 1. divisjon: 1992
- Norwegian Cup: 1993
- Tippeligaen runner up: 1993

Rosenborg

- Tippeligaen: 1998
- Norwegian Cup runner up: 1998

Club Brugge

- Belgian First Division: 2002–03, 2004–05
- Belgian Cup: 2001–02, 2003–04
- Belgian Supercup: 2002, 2003, 2004, 2005

Olympiacos

- Super League Greece: 2005–06
- Greek Football Cup: 2005–06

Gent

- Belgian Cup runner-up: 2007–08

Heerenveen

- KNVB Cup: 2009

=== Player ===
Vålerenga

- 1. divisjon (2): 1983, 1984

Rosenborg

- Norwegian top flight (3): 1985, 1988, 1990
- Norwegian Cup (2): 1988, 1990

Bodø/Glimt

- 1. divisjon: 1992
- Norwegian Cup: 1993
