= 1996–97 Belgian Cup =

Tournament details
- Country: Belgium

Final positions
- Champions: Germinal Ekeren
- Runners-up: Anderlecht

Tournament statistics
- Matches played: 35
- Goals scored: 112 (3.2 per match)
- Top goal scorer: Oleg Iachtchouk (5 goals)

The 1996–97 Belgian Cup was the 42nd season of the main knockout competition in Belgian association football, the Belgian Cup.

== Final rounds ==
The final phase started in the round of 32 when all clubs from the first division entered the competition (18 clubs plus 14 clubs from the qualifications). All rounds were played in one leg except for the semifinals. For the first time, a replay was introduced for teams drawing in the quarter-finals only. The final game was played at the Heysel Stadium in Brussels and won by Germinal Ekeren against Anderlecht.

=== Bracket ===
Round of 32
Charleroi	1
Louviéroise	0
Standard Liège	3
Patro Eisden	2
Germinal Ekeren	4
Geel	0
Sint-Truidense	1
Lokeren	2
Heirnis Gent	1(8)
Antwerp	1(7)
Aalst	3
Mouscron	0
Denderleeuw	2
Lommelse	0
Genk	0
Kortrijk	1
KV Mechelen	3
Hemptinne-Eghezée	0
Tielen	2*
Sint-Niklase	1
Club Brugge	2
Lierse	3*
Cercle Brugge	2(6)
Tilleur	2(7)
Hamme	3
Beerschot	0
Gent	1
Molenbeek	0
Oostende	0
Anderlecht	2
Poederlee	1
Harelbeke	0

Round of 16
Charleroi	2(3)
Standard Liège	2(4)
Germinal Ekeren	4*
Lokeren	3
Heirnis Gent	1
Aalst	2
Denderleeuw	1(5)
Kortrijk	1(4)
KV Mechelen	1(4)
Tielen	1(5)
Lierse	2
Tilleur	1
Hamme	2
Gent	5
Anderlecht	6
Poederlee	0

Quarter-finals
Standard Liège	1/0
Germinal Ekeren	1/3+
Aalst	2/1+
Denderleeuw	2/0
Tielen	2
Lierse	1
Gent	1
Anderlecht	3

Semifinals
Germinal Ekeren	0	3
Aalst	0	3
Tielen	0	2
Anderlecht	1	3

Final
Germinal Ekeren	4*
Anderlecht	2

* after extra time + after replay

=== Final ===
1 June 1997
16:00

Germinal Ekeren	4–2 (a.e.t.)	Anderlecht
Johnson 65' (o.g.); Kinet 85'; Radzinski 93'; Hofmans 96'		Iachtchouk 32'; Johnson 57'

King Baudouin Stadium, Brussels
Attendance: 21,520
Referee: Marnix Sandra
