= Joe Spiteri =

Australian soccer player

Personal information
- Full name: Joseph Spiteri
- Date of birth: 6 May 1973 (age 53)
- Height: 1.84 m (6 ft 1/2 in)
- Position: Striker

Senior career*
Years	Team	Apps	(Gls)
1992–1993	Albion Rovers	46	(17)
1993–1994	Parramatta Eagles	25	(5)
1994–1996	Melbourne Knights	53	(20)
1996–1998	Sturm Graz	35	(4)
1998–2001	Lierse	35	(7)
2001	IFK Norrköping	8	(1)
2001–2002	Sydney Olympic	4	(0)
2002–2004	Marconi Stallions	38	(12)
2004–2006	Kingston City	45	(27)
2007–2008	Melbourne Knights	48	(8)
2009–2011	Werribee City		(27)
2013–2016	Point Cook	51	(54)
Total		388	(155)

International career
1995–1997	Australia	8	(2)
Medal record
Representing Australia
Men's Association football
OFC Nations Cup
Winner	1996 Oceania
- * Club domestic league appearances and goals

Joseph Spiteri (born 6 May 1973) is an Australian former soccer player who played at both professional and international levels as a striker.

== Personal life ==
Spiteri is of Maltese descent and lives in a Maltese neighbourhood of a Victorian suburb.

== Career ==
Spiteri played at club level in Australia, Austria, Belgium and Sweden for Albion Rovers, Parramatta Eagles, Melbourne Knights, Sturm Graz, Lierse, IFK Norrköping, Sydney Olympic, Marconi Stallions and Kingston City. While at Lierse he helped them win the 1998–99 Belgian Cup, scoring in the final against Standard Liège. During his time in Belgium, he was known as "Joe The Kangaroo".

He also earned eight caps for Australia, and participated at the 1996 Summer Olympics.

=== International goals ===
Scores and results list Australia's goal tally first.

No	Date	Venue	Opponent	Score	Result	Competition
1.	15 November 1995	Breakers Stadium, Newcastle, Australia	New Zealand	3–0	3–0	1995 Trans-Tasman Cup
2.	14 February 1996	Bob Jane Stadium, Melbourne, Australia	Japan	2–0	3–0	Friendly

== Honours ==
Lierse SK

- Belgian Cup: 1998–99

Australia

- OFC Nations Cup: 1996
