= Jürgen Cavens =

Belgian footballer

Personal information
- Full name: Jürgen Cavens
- Date of birth: 19 August 1978 (age 48)
- Place of birth: Broechem, Belgium
- Height: 1.88 m (6 ft 2 in)
- Position: Striker

Youth career
- FC Broechem
- Lierse

Senior career*
Years	Team	Apps	(Gls)
1995–2001	Lierse	115	(33)
2001–2003	Standard Liège	22	(3)
2002	→ Marseille (loan)	5	(1)
2002–2003	→ Twente (loan)	25	(6)
2004	Gent	12	(1)
2004–2007	Germinal Beerschot	71	(18)
2008–2011	Lierse	121	(50)
2012–2013	Waasland-Beveren	35	(5)
2013–2014	Cappellen	14	(3)
2014	Beerschot Wilrijk	12	(9)

International career
1999–2000	Belgium	5	(1)
- * Club domestic league appearances and goals

Jürgen Cavens (born 19 August 1978 in Broechem) is a Belgian retired footballer. He is also a former Belgian international.

== Career statistics ==
=== International ===
Appearances and goals by national team and year
National team	Year	Apps	Goals
Belgium	1999	4	0
Belgium	2000	1	1
Total		5	1

Scores and results list Belgium's goal tally first, score column indicates score after each Cavens goal.

List of international goals scored by Jürgen Cavens
No.	Date	Venue	Opponent	Score	Result	Competition
1	7 October 2000	Skonto Stadium, Riga, Latvia	Latvia	3–0	4–0	2002 FIFA World Cup qualification

== Honours ==
=== Club ===
Lierse

- Belgian First Division A: 1996–97
- Belgian Cup: 1998–99
- Belgian Super Cup: 1997, 1999

Beerschot A.C.

- Belgian Cup: 2004–05
