= K.F.C. Denderleeuw Eendracht Hekelgem =

Belgian football club

K.F.C. Denderleeuw Eendracht Hekelgem is a Belgian former association football club based in Denderleeuw. They used to play their home games at the Florent Beeckmanstadion. Their home colours were striped blue-black shirts and black shorts. Their highest league finish was a 4th place in the second division in 1997–98. Their best cup result was a qualification for the round of 16 by beating Anderlecht in 1998–99. They lost to Lokeren in the next round.

FC Denderleeuw was founded in 1952 and registered to the Royal Belgian Football Association in 1953. In 1973, they first reached the third division, where they remained only two seasons before going down to the lower levels of football. They were back at this level though in 1993 and then they first qualified for the second division in 1996. The club qualified for the final round the next season but they failed to promote in the first division, finishing at the third place. The next season they also qualified for the final round, by finishing 4th in the second division, their highest ranking in the Belgian leagues ever. However, they ended second in the final round, 3 points behind Kortrijk, and missed the promotion to the first division again. At the end of the 2000–01 season, FC Denderleeuw merged with neighbour FC Eendracht Hekelgem to form FC Denderleeuw EH. In 2002–03, Denderleeuw reached again the second final round, but finished 4th. At the end of the next season, Denderleeuw was relegated to the third division. After one season at that level, Denderleeuw merged with Verbroedering Denderhoutem to form FC Verbroedering Dender EH.
