= 2018 Belgian Cup final =

- Event: 2017–18 Belgian Cup
Genk	Standard Liège
0	1
- After extra time
- Date: 17 March 2018
- Venue: King Baudouin Stadium, Brussels
- Man of the Match: Renaud Emond
- Referee: Jonathan Lardot
- Attendance: 44,807

The 2018 Belgian Cup final, named Croky Cup after the sponsor, was the 63rd Belgian Cup final and took place on 17 March 2018. The match was played between Genk, who qualified on 6 February 2018, and Standard Liège who qualified two days later. In a dull match without many chances, Standard Liège won after extra time with the only goal coming from Renaud Emond at the beginning of extra time. As a result, Standard Liège qualified for the 2018–19 UEFA Europa League Group stage.

Standard had already won the cup seven times (out of 16 finals), with their last win in 2016 against Club Brugge. Genk made its fifth appearance in the Belgian Cup Final and had won on all four previous occasions. The 2000 Belgian Cup Final also featured Genk and Standard, with Genk overcoming an early deficit to win by four goals to one.

== Route to the final ==
Genk					Standard Liège
Opponent	Result	Legs	Scorers	Round	Opponent	Result	Legs	Scorers
Cercle Brugge (II)	1–0	1–0 away	Pozuelo	Sixth round	Heist (III)	4–0	4–0 home	Carlinhos, Marin, Sá, Čop
Mechelen (I)	1–1 (a.e.t.) (5–4 p)	1–1 away	Ingvartsen	Seventh round	Anderlecht (I)	1–0	1–0 away	Carlinhos
Waasland-Beveren (I)	3–3 (a.e.t.) (4–2 p)	3–3 home	Malinovskyi (2), Trossard	Quarter-finals	Oostende (I)	3–2	3–2 away	Sá, Marin, Emond
Kortrijk (I)	3–3 (a.g.)	2–3 away; 1–0 home	Ingvartsen, Buffel; Seck	Semi-finals	Club Brugge (I)	6–4	4–1 home; 2–3 away	Emond (3), Edmilson; Sá, Emond

== Match ==
=== Summary ===
On an ice cold evening, both teams offered a very meagre display as the match started with many fouls and fierce duels, but without any chances. About 15 minutes into the match, a header from Renaud Emond that landed on top of the goal was the first meaningful event. As both teams did not succeed to set up successful combinations, they started trying long range shots, but neither Răzvan Marin nor Ibrahima Seck managed to keep their shots on target. Nikos Karelis did, but his shot was correctly disallowed for offside. Key players Alejandro Pozuelo and Mehdi Carcela were nowhere to be seen and only set pieces some small chances in the remainder of the first half, with both Christian Luyindama and Joseph Aidoo putting their headers off target.

The second half did not prove to be much better, Standard Liège started best with dangerous long distance kicks from Edmilson Junior and Collins Fai but still the match remained without a single effort on target. Alejandro Pozuelo was very much invisible, but almost benefited from a mistake from Luis Pedro Cavanda, before his assist was snatched away by Jean-François Gillet just before Nikos Karelis could get to it. A deflected shot from Răzvan Marin caused some minor excitement at the other end of the pitch. It took until the very end of the second half before a first attempt on target was made, Joseph Aidoo almost headed in the winner on a corner kick, but a stunning reflex from Jean-François Gillet denied his effort.

In the extra-time, Standard Liège started furiously, with a back-heel pass from Paul-José M'Poku setting up Mehdi Carcela to give a perfect assist for Renaud Emond who headed in the ball past Danny Vukovic. Genk now had to advance quickly and almost got lucky as a cross from Bojan Nastić nearly landed in goal. A free-kick from Ruslan Malinovskyi just missed the goal. In the second half of the extra-time, Genk was not able to get past Gillet, despite efforts from Leandro Trossard. The game had also become extra fierce, forcing referee Jonathan Lardot to give several yellow cards, eventually even sending off Bojan Nastić just minutes before time.

=== Details ===
17 March 2018
20:45

Genk	0–1 (a.e.t.)	Standard Liège
	report	Emond 92'

King Baudouin Stadium, Brussels
Attendance: 44,807
Referee: Jonathan Lardot

Genk	Standard Liège

GK	1	(Australia) Danny Vukovic
RB	27	(Angola) Clinton Mata	(yellow card) 82'
CB	45	(Ghana) Joseph Aidoo
CB	15	(The Gambia) Omar Colley
LB	3	(Serbia) Bojan Nastić	(yellow card) 90' (yellow-red card) 120+1'
DM	17	(Senegal) Ibrahima Seck
CM	24	(Spain) Alejandro Pozuelo
CM	18	(Ukraine) Ruslan Malinovskyi		(substituted off) 110'
RW	19	(Belgium) Thomas Buffel	(yellow card) 109'
LW	77	(Democratic Republic of the Congo) Dieumerci Ndongala	(yellow card) 62'	(substituted off) 64'
CF	7	(Greece) Nikos Karelis		(substituted off) 74'
Substitutes:
DF	4	(Belgium) Dries Wouters		(substituted on) 110'
DF	6	(Belgium) Sébastien Dewaest
FW	10	(Tanzania) Mbwana Samatta	(yellow card) 90+1'	(substituted on) 74'
FW	14	(Belgium) Leandro Trossard		(substituted on) 64'
FW	22	(Belgium) Siebe Schrijvers
GK	30	(Belgium) Nordin Jackers
DF	31	(Denmark) Joakim Mæhle
Manager:
(Belgium) Philippe Clement

GK	1	(Belgium) Jean-François Gillet
RB	29	(Belgium) Luis Pedro Cavanda
CB	26	(Democratic Republic of the Congo) Christian Luyindama	(yellow card) 105'
CB	24	(Greece) Georgios Koutroumpis
LB	21	(Cameroon) Collins Fai	(yellow card) 82'
CM	6	(Bosnia and Herzegovina) Gojko Cimirot
CM	18	(Romania) Răzvan Marin	(yellow card) 103'
RW	22	(Belgium) Edmilson Junior		(substituted off) 97'
AM	10	(Morocco) Mehdi Carcela	(yellow card) 105'	(substituted off) 105'
LW	40	(Democratic Republic of the Congo) Paul-José M'Poku	(yellow card) 67'
CF	9	(Belgium) Renaud Emond		(substituted off) 120+2'
Substitutes:
DF	2	(Haiti) Réginal Goreux
FW	7	(Croatia) Duje Čop		(substituted on) 97'
GK	13	(Mexico) Guillermo Ochoa
DF	15	(Belgium) Sébastien Pocognoli		(substituted on) 120+2'
MF	19	(Mali) Moussa Djenepo	(yellow card) 116'	(substituted on) 105'
FW	25	(Brazil) Carlinhos
MF	30	(Albania) Lindon Selahi
Manager:
(Portugal) Ricardo Sá Pinto

Match rules

- 90 minutes.
- 30 minutes of extra time if necessary.
- Penalty shoot-out if scores still level.
- Seven named substitutes.
- Maximum of three substitutions.
