= 1998 Belgian Cup final =

- Event: 1997–98 Belgian Cup
Genk	Club Brugge
4	0
- Date: 16 May 1998
- Venue: King Baudouin Stadium, Brussels
- Referee: Armand Ancion

The 1998 Belgian Cup final, took place on 16 May 1998 between Genk and Club Brugge. It was the 43rd Belgian Cup final. Genk played their first Cup final ever and took a convincing victory, by four goals to nil.

== Route to the final ==
Genk				Club Brugge
Opponent	Result	Legs	Round	Opponent	Result	Legs
Lebbeke (IV)	2–1	2–1 home	Sixth round	Oostende (II)	4–1	4–1 home
Lierse	3–1	3–1 home	Seventh round	Patro Eisden (II)	6–0	6–0 home
Sint-Truiden	3–1	3–1 home	Quarter-finals	Standard Liège	5–1	5–1 home
Germinal Ekeren	2–2 (away goals)	2–2 away, 0–0 home	Semi-finals	Mouscron	3–2	1–1 home; 2–1 away

== Match ==
=== Details ===
16 May 1998
20:00

Genk	4–0	Club Brugge
Oularé 26', 27'; Guðjónsson 39'; Peeters 59'	Report

King Baudouin Stadium, Brussels
Attendance: 35,000
Referee: Armand Ancion

Genk	Club Brugge

GK	(Hungary) István Brockhauser
SW	(Belgium) Domenico Olivieri (c)	(substituted off) 88'
RB	(Belgium) Jacky Peeters
CB	(Belgium) Wilfried Delbroek
CB	(Belgium) Marc Vangronsveld
LB	(Belgium) Davy Oyen
CM	(Belgium) Andy Stroy
CM	(Belgium) Philippe Clement	(substituted off) 87'
RW	(Iceland) Þórður Guðjónsson
LW	(Belgium) Marc Hendrikx
CF	(Ghana) Souleymane Oularé	(substituted off) 86'
Substitutes:
RW	(Senegal) Salif Keïta	(substituted on) 86'
CM	(Democratic Republic of the Congo) Ngoy Nsumbu	(substituted on) 87'
CF	(Poland) Ernest Konon	(substituted on) 88'
Manager:
(Belgium) Aimé Anthuenis

GK	(Belgium) Dany Verlinden
SW	(Belgium) Lorenzo Staelens		(substituted off) 84'
RB	(Belgium) Tjörven De Brul
CB	(Federal Republic of Yugoslavia) Milan Lešnjak
LB	(Federal Republic of Yugoslavia) Aleksandar Ilić
CM	(Ghana) Eric Addo
CM	(Belgium) Franky Van der Elst (c)		(substituted off) 63'
RW	(Belgium) Gert Verheyen
AM	(Senegal) Khalilou Fadiga	Booked
LW	(Federal Republic of Yugoslavia) Darko Anić
CF	(Lithuania) Edgaras Jankauskas		(substituted off) 46'
Substitutes:
RB	(Belgium) Olivier De Cock		(substituted on) 46'
CM	(Belgium) Sven Vermant		(substituted on) 63'
RB	(Belgium) Eric Deflandre		(substituted on) 84'
Manager:
(Belgium) Eric Gerets

Match rules

- 90 minutes.
- 30 minutes of extra time if necessary.
- Penalty shoot-out if scores still level.
- Seven named substitutes.
- Maximum of three substitutions.
