= 2022 Belgian Cup final =

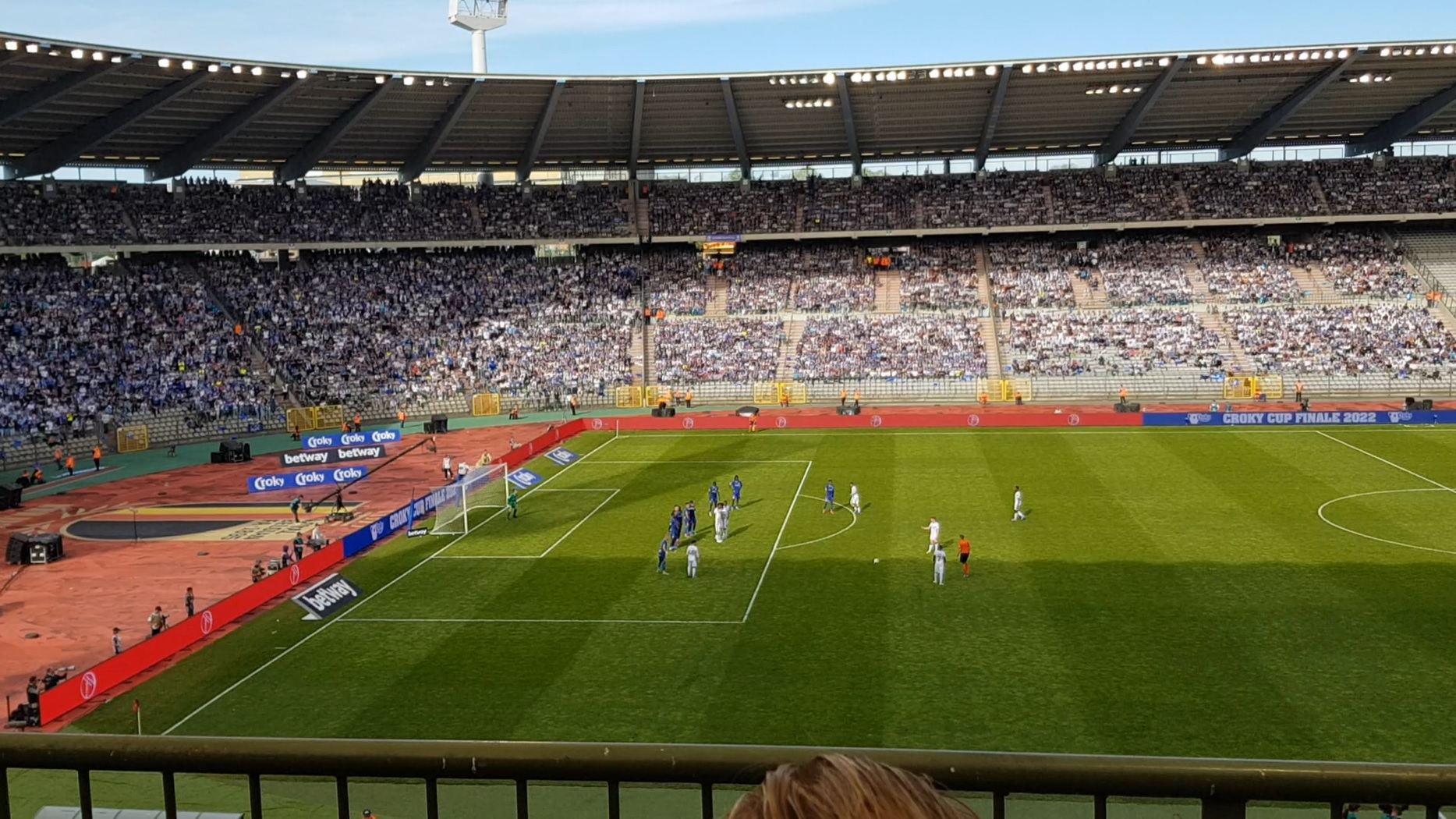
- Gent giving a free kick in the extra time
- Event: 2021–22 Belgian Cup
Gent	Anderlecht
0	0
- After extra time Gent won 4–3 on penalties
- Date: 18 April 2022
- Venue: King Baudouin Stadium, Brussels
- Referee: Lawrence Visser

The 2022 Belgian Cup final, named Croky Cup after the sponsor, was the 67th Belgian Cup final. On 2 March 2022, Gent qualified for their 6th final, losing 2 and winning 3. Anderlecht qualified one day later, reaching their fourteenth final, having won nine times before, the last time of which occurred in 2008, when they also faced Gent in the 2008 Belgian Cup Final. After a tense 0–0 draw after extra time, Gent won 4–3 on penalties.

== Route to the final ==
Gent					Anderlecht
Opponent	Result	Legs	Scorers	Round	Opponent	Result	Legs	Scorers
Belisia (IV)	4–0	4–0 home	Odjidja-Ofoe, Okumu, Mboyo, Chakvetadze	Sixth round	La Louvière (IV)	7–1	7–1 away	Zirkzee (2), Hoedt (2), Refaelov (2), Raman
Lommel (II)	2–0	2–0 away	De Sart (2)	Seventh round	Seraing (I)	3–3	3–3 away (a.e.t.) (4–3 p)	Kouamé (2), Refaelov
Standard Liège (I)	3–1	3–1 home	Kums, Tissoudali (2)	Quarter-finals	Kortrijk (I)	3–0	3–0 home	Kouamé (2), Gómez
Club Brugge (I)	3–1	0–1 home; 3–0 away	none; Odjidja-Ofoe, Castro-Montes, Depoitre	Semi-finals	Eupen (I)	5–3	2–2 away; 3–1 home	Refaelov (2); Murillo, Magallán, Kouamé

== Pre-match ==
From a personnel perspective, both clubs seemingly started in full force, as they saw several players return from injury just in time for the final. Gent recuperated captain Vadis Odjidja-Ofoe, who previously played for Anderlecht, while at Anderlecht both Sergio Gómez and Yari Verschaeren were able to start the match, while Majeed Ashimeru started on the bench as he was not deemed ready for a full match yet. Just before the match however, Gent suffered a set back as striker Laurent Depoitre got injured and was unable to play.

Looking at the results going into the match, Gent had reached the last 16 of the UEFA Europa Conference League and ended the regular season scoring 25 out of 27 points, nevertheless, despite their strong run and comeback in the league standings, they had only finished 5th, thus missing out on the Champions' Playoffs on the final matchday. Their winning streak did however include a 1–0 victory over Anderlecht in the third week of March. Anderlecht from their side had been relieved to just reach the Champions' Playoffs after finishing third in the league. The winner of the final would be assured of a place in the play-off round of the 2022–23 UEFA Europa League. In case of a loss, Gent would only be able to reach European football through winning Play-Off II and the European competition play-offs (although the latter might be canceled in case Anderlecht would qualify for the UEFA Champions League through finishing 1st or 2nd in the league). Anderlecht knew a loss in the cup final would mean they would need to finish top three in the league to be certain of European football, in case they dropped to fourth, they would however need to win the European competition play-offs.

== Match ==
=== Summary ===
Even without their targetman Laurent Depoitre, who dropped out during the warmup, Gent started strongly as Hendrik Van Crombrugge only narrowly reached the header by Michael Ngadeu-Ngadjui in the opening minutes, after which they took control of the match. While Anderlecht was suffering, they did create a big chance, with the deviation of Yari Verschaeren rolling straight into Davy Roef. It would be their only real dangerous opportunity of the first half, with other minor chances coming through an overhead kick by Lior Refaelov, a volley by Verschaeren and a blocked shot by Kristoffer Olsson. On the other side of the pitch, Gent remained much more threatening. Tarik Tissoudali dribbled his way around Lisandro Magallán, but the latter was able to stay close, not allowing Tissoudali a clean shot on goal. Then, sloppy defending by Michael Amir Murillo gave Vadis Odjidja-Ofoe an opportunity to shoot but his attempt went just wide. Five minutes before the break, Roman Bezus seemingly opened the score, but his header on a cross by Joseph Okumu was disallowed for offside.

In the second half Gent immediately continued where it left off, through a header from Julien De Sart and a blistering shot from Vadis Odjidja-Ofoe, but they did not manage to score. Anderlecht manager Vincent Kompany tried to turn things around by bringing in Francis Amuzu, Majeed Ashimeru and Benito Raman around the hour mark to allow a more direct style of play, which indeed restored the balance of play, but did not result in any chances created. The game became more fierce, with both Ashimeru and Andrew Hjulsager having to leave the pitch injured after being substituted on earlier in the second half, and play was often stopped due to players receiving treatment. On top of this, an environmental activist had tied himself to one of the goalposts, causing a further few minutes of pause. All of this resulted in a dull second half after the initial chances.

As such, it came as a surprise when at the start of extra time the game burst open again, Núrio Fortuna missing a huge chance for Gent, heading wide, while just after that Matisse Samoise could only narrowly intercept Anouar Ait El Hadj who had broken through for Anderlecht. At that point it seemed the Anderlecht players were more energetic while Gent needed willpower to keep up, they could only breathe a sigh of relief when Christian Kouamé recklessly shot over the bar. The final chance of the match was for Gent however, as Darko Lemajić hit the underside of the bar from close range in minute 116, but the game stayed goalless. In the penalty kick sequence, Davy Roef became the hero for Gent, saving the penalty kicks by Josh Cullen and Michael Amir Murillo, while Van Crombrugge had only been able to keep out the effort of Michael Ngadeu-Ngadjui, allowing Gent to take their first trophy since their league title in 2015, while Anderlecht continued its period without silverware, last winning the 2017 Belgian Super Cup.

=== Details ===
18 April 2022
15:00 CEST

Gent	0–0 (a.e.t.)	Anderlecht
	Report
Penalties
De Sart (penalty scored); Hanche-Olsen (penalty scored); Castro-Montes (penalty scored); Lemajić (penalty scored); Ngadeu-Ngadjui (penalty missed)	4–3	(penalty scored) Gómez; (penalty scored) Raman; (penalty scored) Kana; (penalty missed) Cullen; (penalty missed) Murillo

King Baudouin Stadium, Brussels
Referee: Lawrence Visser

Gent	Anderlecht

GK	33	(Belgium) Davy Roef
CB	20	(Nigeria) Jordan Torunarigha
CB	5	(Cameroon) Michael Ngadeu-Ngadjui
CB	2	(Kenya) Joseph Okumu
MF	18	(Belgium) Matisse Samoise		(substituted off) 106'
MF	24	(Belgium) Sven Kums		(substituted off) 106'
MF	8	(Belgium) Vadis Odjidja-Ofoe		(substituted off) 69'
MF	13	(Belgium) Julien De Sart
MF	14	(Belgium) Alessio Castro-Montes
CF	9	(Ukraine) Roman Bezus		(substituted off) 88'
CF	34	(Morocco) Tarik Tissoudali		(substituted off) 91'
Substitutes:
GK	1	(Turkey) Sinan Bolat
MF	6	(Ghana) Elisha Owusu	(substituted on) 106'	(yellow card) 114'
FW	11	(Serbia) Darko Lemajić	(substituted on) 88'
MF	17	(Denmark) Andrew Hjulsager	(substituted on) 69'	(substituted off) 90+2'
DF	21	(Norway) Andreas Hanche-Olsen	(substituted on) 106'
FW	23	(Israel) Yonas Malede	(substituted on) 91'
DF	25	(Angola) Núrio Fortuna	(substituted on) 90+2'
Manager:
(Belgium) Hein Vanhaezebrouck

GK	30	(Belgium) Hendrik Van Crombrugge
RB	62	(Panama) Michael Amir Murillo	(yellow card) 90+4'
CB	2	(Argentina) Lisandro Magallán	(yellow card) 95'
CB	4	(Netherlands) Wesley Hoedt
LB	17	(Spain) Sergio Gómez
MF	10	(Belgium) Yari Verschaeren		(substituted off) 58'
MF	20	(Sweden) Kristoffer Olsson	(yellow card) 33'	(substituted off) 58'
MF	8	(Republic of Ireland) Josh Cullen
MF	11	(Israel) Lior Refaelov		(substituted off) 91'
CF	99	(Ivory Coast) Christian Kouamé	(yellow card) 118'
CF	23	(Netherlands) Joshua Zirkzee		(substituted off) 58'
Substitutes:
MF	7	(Belgium) Francis Amuzu	(substituted on) 58'
FW	9	(Belgium) Benito Raman	(substituted on) 58'
DF	14	(Ukraine) Bohdan Mykhaylichenko
GK	16	(Netherlands) Bart Verbruggen
MF	18	(Ghana) Majeed Ashimeru	(substituted on) 58'	(substituted off) 76'
MF	46	(Belgium) Anouar Ait El Hadj	(substituted on) 91'
DF	55	(Belgium) Marco Kana	(substituted on) 76'
Manager:
(Belgium) Vincent Kompany

Assistant referees:
Rien Vanzyere
Thibaud Nijssen
Fourth official:
Christof Dierick

Match rules

- 90 minutes.
- 30 minutes of extra time if necessary.
- Penalty shoot-out if scores still level.
- Seven named substitutes.
- Maximum of three substitutions.
