= 2016 Belgian Cup final =

- Event: 2015–16 Belgian Cup
Club Brugge	Standard Liège
1	2
- Date: 20 March 2016
- Venue: King Baudouin Stadium, Brussels
- Referee: Johan Verbist
- Attendance: 50,093

The 2016 Belgian Cup final, named Croky Cup after the sponsor, was the 61st Belgian Cup final and took place on 20 March 2016 between Club Brugge and Standard Liège. It was the first time the two teams met in the final since the 2006–07 Belgian Cup Final. Standard Liège won the match by 2 goals to 1, with the final goal coming two minutes from time.

== Route to the final ==
Standard Liège				Club Brugge
Opponent	Result	Legs	Round	Opponent	Result	Legs
Coxyde (II)	3–2	3–2 away	Sixth round	Patro Eisden Maasmechelen (II)	4–0	4–0 away
Sint-Truiden	2–0	2–0 home	Seventh round	Lokeren	1–0	1–0 home
Kortrijk	2–0	2–0 home	Quarter-finals	Westerlo	2–0	2–0 away
Genk	3–1	2–0 home; 1–1 away	Semi-finals	Gent	2–2	1–2 away; 1–0 home

== Match ==
=== Details ===
20 March 2016
16:00

Club Brugge	1–2	Standard Liège
Refaelov 27'	Report	Dompé 17'; Santini 88'

King Baudouin Stadium, Brussels
Attendance: 50,093
Referee: Johan Verbist

Club Brugge	Standard Liège

GK	1	(France) Ludovic Butelle
RB	19	(Belgium) Thomas Meunier
CB	40	(Belgium) Björn Engels
CB	5	(France) Benoît Poulain
LB	28	(Belgium) Laurens De Bock
MF	25	(Netherlands) Ruud Vormer		(substituted off) 90'
MF	20	(Belgium) Hans Vanaken	(yellow card) 20'	(substituted off) 90'
MF	3	(Belgium) Timmy Simons (c)	(yellow card) 9'
MF	8	(Israel) Lior Refaelov
FW	10	(Mali) Abdoulay Diaby	(red card) 51'
FW	22	(Colombia) José Izquierdo		(substituted off) 61'
Substitutes:
DF	2	(Belgium) Davy De fauw
MF	6	(Brazil) Claudemir
FW	9	(Belgium) Jelle Vossen		(substituted on) 90'
GK	16	(Belgium) Sébastien Bruzzese
MF	18	(Brazil) Felipe Gedoz	(yellow card) 90'	(substituted on) 90'
CB	44	(Belgium) Brandon Mechele
FW	55	(Belgium) Tuur Dierckx		(substituted on) 61'
Manager:
(Belgium) Michel Preud'homme

GK	1	(Spain) Víctor Valdés	(yellow card) 90+4'
RW	33	(Cameroon) Collins Fai
CB	13	(Denmark) Alexander Scholz
CB	33	(Serbia) Miloš Kosanović
LB	27	(Colombia) Darwin Andrade	(yellow card) 39'
CM	7	(Greece) Giannis Maniatis
CM	17	(Togo) Mathieu Dossevi
CM	23	(France) Adrien Trebel (c)	(yellow card) 7'	(substituted off) 74'
LW	10	(France) Jean-Luc Dompé
CF	18	(Croatia) Ivan Santini		(substituted off) 90+2'
CF	22	(Belgium) Edmilson Junior	(yellow card) 57'	(substituted off) 90'
Substitutes:
DF	2	(Haiti) Réginal Goreux
FW	9	(Belgium) Renaud Emond		(substituted on) 74'
FW	11	(Ghana) Benjamin Tetteh
FW	15	(Uganda) Farouk Miya
GK	28	(Belgium) Guillaume Hubert
MF	30	(Belgium) Jonathan Legear		(substituted on) 90+2'
DF	36	(Belgium) Dino Arslanagić		(substituted on) 90'
Manager:
(Belgium) Yannick Ferrera

Match rules

- 90 minutes.
- 30 minutes of extra time if necessary.
- Penalty shoot-out if scores still level.
- Seven named substitutes.
- Maximum of three substitutions.
