= Pickx+ Sports =

Belgian sports television network

Pickx+ Sports is a Belgian sports television network owned by Proximus Group subsidiary Proximus Media House. The channel launched as Belgacom 11 in 2005 to coincide with its surprise acquisition of the broadcast rights of the Belgian football league and has since grown its scope to include other sports.

The channels are available in Belgium on the Proximus Pickx platform and in Luxembourg on the Proximus-owned Tango.

== History ==
In May 2005, Belgacom bought the exclusivity rights to air the Jupiler Pro League. The telecommunications company paid €36 million per season, while sublicensing the rights to the highlights to VRT, as well as a match on Canvas for free. The remaining matches would air as part of an encrypted add-on exclusive to Belgacom. To this end Belgacom entrusted Flemish producer Woestijnvis to make the television production of the matches, employing teams in both Dutch and French languages.

On 27 July 2012, Belgacom launched Belgacom 11+, dedicated to international football events they had the rights to, as well as overflow for the Jupiler Pro League. The channel was created as a result of the acquisition of the rights to the UEFA Champions League and the Spanish and Portuguese leagues. The first match broadcast on the new channel was the 2012 Eusébio Cup. It also started Belgacom 5 for the coverage of the Belgian basketball league the same year. The channel closed on 30 June 2015.

In July 2019, coinciding with changes to Proximus TV's subscription sports package, Proximus 11 was renamed Proximus Sports. The channels adopted the current name in 2021, becoming Pickx+ Sports.
