= Samuel Johnson (footballer, born 1973) =

Ghanaian footballer

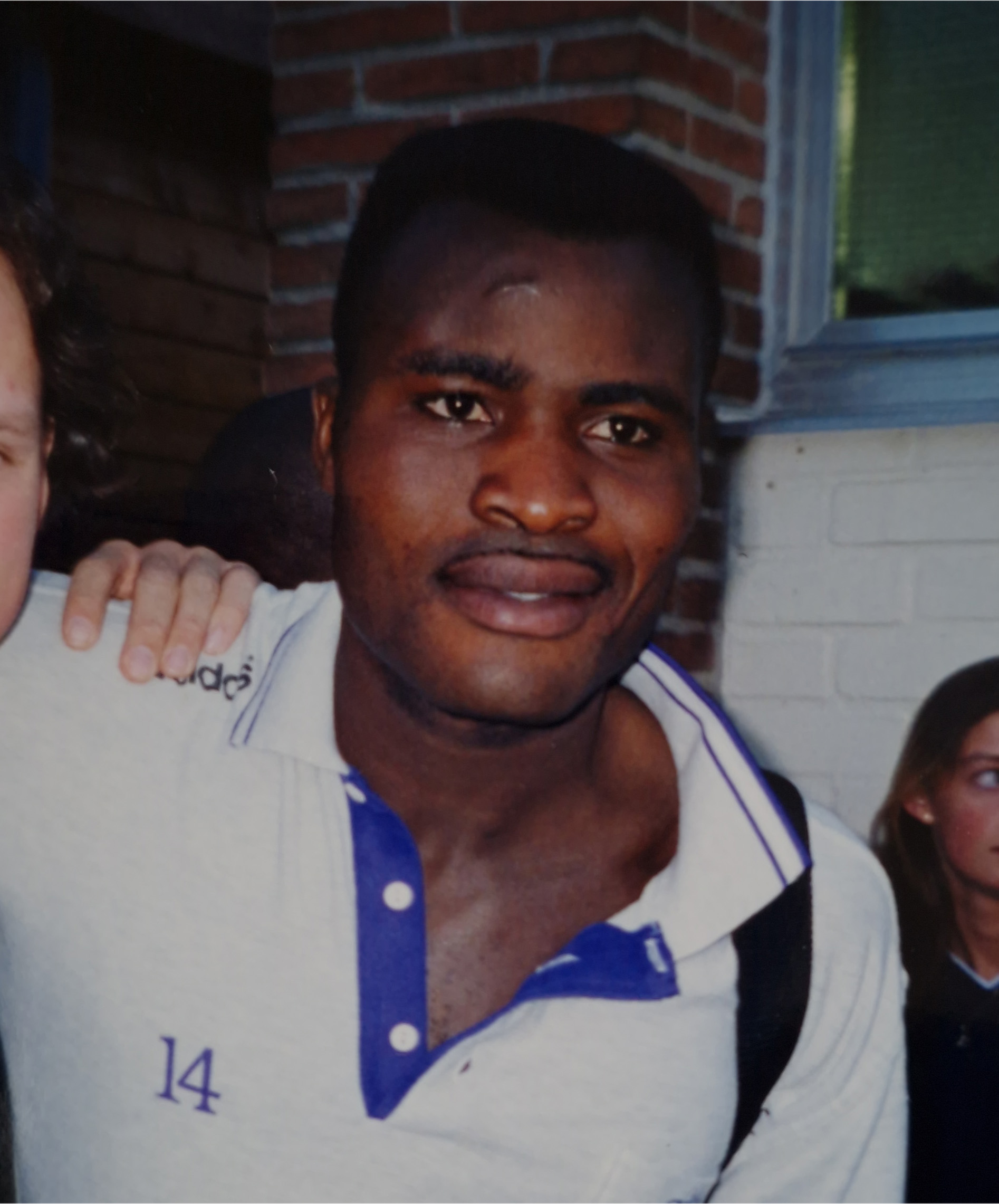
- Johnson with Anderlecht in 1997

Personal information
- Date of birth: 25 July 1973 (age 53)
- Place of birth: Accra, Ghana
- Height: 1.82 m (6 ft 0 in)
- Position: Midfielder

Senior career*
Years	Team	Apps	(Gls)
1991–1995	Hearts of Oak		
1995–1996	Kalamata	20	(6)
1996–1998	Anderlecht	37	(2)
1998–1999	Gaziantepspor	33	(2)
1999–2003	Fenerbahçe	151	(24)
2003–2004	Gaziantepspor	30	(3)
2004–2006	Kayserispor	62	(6)
Total		353+	(43+)

International career
1994–2003	Ghana	50	(5)
- * Club domestic league appearances and goals

Samuel Johnson (born 25 July 1973) is a Ghanaian former professional footballer who played as a midfielder.

== Career ==
Johnson was born in Accra. He played for Kayserispor, Gaziantepspor and Fenerbahçe SK in Turkey, Anderlecht in Belgium and Kalamata in Greece.

== Career statistics ==
=== International ===
Scores and results list Ghana's goal tally first, score column indicates score after each Johnson goal.

List of international goals scored by Samuel Johnson
No.	Date	Venue	Opponent	Score	Result	Competition
1	29 December 1995	Cairo International Stadium, Cairo, Egypt	Egypt	?–?	2–1	Friendly
2	17 June 1996	Kumasi Sports Stadium, Kumasi, Ghana	Tanzania	1–0	2–1	1998 FIFA World Cup qualification
3	12 January 1997	Kumasi Sports Stadium, Kumasi, Ghana	Morocco	1–2	2–2	1998 FIFA World Cup qualification
4	12 February 1998	Stade du 4 Août, Ouagadougou, Burkina Faso	Togo	1–1	1–2	1998 Africa Cup of Nations
4	4 October 1998	Reunification Stadium, Douala, Cameroon	Cameroon	2–1	3–1	2000 Africa Cup of Nations qualification

== Honours ==
Hearts of Oak

- Ghanaian FA Cup: 1993–94

Fenerbahçe

- Süper Lig: 2000–01
