= 1998–99 Belgian Cup =

Tournament details
- Country: Belgium

Final positions
- Champions: Lierse
- Runners-up: Standard Liège

Tournament statistics
- Matches played: 33
- Goals scored: 135 (4.09 per match)
- Top goal scorer: Jurgen Cavens (9 goals)

The 1998–99 Belgian Cup was the 44th season of the main knockout competition in Belgian association football, the Belgian Cup.

== Final rounds ==
The final phase started in the round of 32 when all clubs from the first division entered the competition (18 clubs plus 14 clubs from the qualifications). All rounds were played in one leg except for the semifinals. The final game was played at the Heysel Stadium in Brussels and won by Lierse against Standard Liège.

=== Bracket ===
Round of 32
Lommelse	3
Cappellen	1
Sint-Truidense	1(3)
Deinze	1(1)
Genk	6
Zultse	2
Tongeren	2
Mouscron	3
Cercle Brugge	2
SK Roeselare	1
Kortrijk	5
Gent	2
Lierse	8
Molenbeek	1
Denderhoutem	2
Waregem	1
Germinal Ekeren	1
Lokeren	2
Denderleeuw	3(4)
Anderlecht	3(2)
Beveren	0(3)
Westerlo	0(4)
Harelbeke	3*
Oostende	1
Maasland Maasmechelen	0
Ingelmunster	4
Tilleur FC Liège	3
Club Brugge	2
Aalst	4
OC Charleroi	3
Louviéroise	3
Standard Liège	4

Round of 16
Lommelse	2
Sint-Truidense	3
Genk	4
Mouscron	3
Cercle Brugge	0
Kortrijk	0
Lierse	2
Denderhoutem	0
Lokeren	2
Denderleeuw	0
Westerlo	2(3)
Harelbeke	2(2)
Ingelmunster	4
Tilleur FC Liège	0
Aalst	0
Standard Liège	3

Quarter-finals
Sint-Truidense	0
Genk	1
Kortrijk	0
Lierse	6
Lokeren	3
Westerlo	0
Ingelmunster	1
Standard Liège	3

Semifinals
Genk	2	1
Lierse	4	1
Lokeren	0	0
Standard Liège	2	3

Final
Lierse	3
Standard Liège	1

* after extra time

=== Final ===
30 May 1999

Lierse	3–1	Standard Liège
Spiteri 16'; Cavens 52', 89'		Lukunku 63'

King Baudouin Stadium, Brussels
Referee: Fernand Meese
