= 2008 Belgian Cup final =

- Event: 2007–08 Belgian Cup
Gent	Anderlecht
2	3
- Date: 18 May 2008
- Venue: King Baudouin Stadium, Brussels
- Referee: Serge Gumienny
- Attendance: 50,000

The 2008 Belgian Cup final, named Cofidis Cup after the sponsor, was played on Sunday, 18 May 2008 between Gent and Anderlecht, won by Anderlecht. It is the 53rd Belgian Cup Final.

== Road to the Final ==
Gent		Round	Anderlecht	
Tienen [D2] H 2–0	Marić 7'; Thijs 47'	Round Six	Hamme [D2] H 2–1	Legear 31'; Mpenza 71'
Mons [D1] A 1–0 (AET)	Vermuth 122'	Round Seven	Waasland [D2] H 2–0	Akın 60'; Boussoufa 62'
Kortrijk [D2] A 1–5	Ruiz 72'	Quarter Finals; First Leg	Dender [D1] H 3–0	Vlček 1', 46'; Mpenza 87'
Kortrijk [D2] H 4–0	Marić 12', 20'; Mutavdžić 82'; Ljubijankič 93'	Quarter Finals; Second Leg	Dender [D1] A 1–1	Goor 17'
Standard Liège [D1] A 2–2	Azofeifa 70'; Ruiz 90'	Semi-finals; First Leg	Germinal Beerschot [D1] H 1–0	Dheedene 87' (OG)
Standard Liège [D1] H 4–0	Foley 45+2'; Ruiz 68'; Moia 70'; Vermuth 82'	Semi-finals; Second Leg	Germinal Beerschot [D1] A 1–1	Vlček 54'

- Both clubs received a bye to round six.
- In square brackets is a letter that represents the opposition's division
  - [D1] = Belgian First Division
  - [D2] = Belgian Second Division

== Match details ==
18 May 2008
16:30 CET

Gent	2–3	Anderlecht
Foley 7'; Olufadé 34'		Polák 8'; Boussoufa 70'; Gillet 71'

King Baudouin Stadium, Brussels
Attendance: 50,000
Referee: Serge Gumienny

Gent	Anderlecht

GENT:
GK	29	(Serbia) Bojan Jorgacević
RB	17	(Venezuela) Roberto Rosales
CB	27	(Belgium) Jonas De Roeck		(substituted off) 86'
CB	3	(Slovenia) Marko Šuler
LB	24	(Serbia) Aleksandar Mutavdžić
CM	8	(Belgium) Bernd Thijs	(yellow card) 12'
CM	28	(Serbia) Miloš Marić	(yellow card) 89'
CM	99	(Senegal) Khalilou Fadiga		(substituted off) 75'
RW	15	(Togo) Adékambi Olufadé		(substituted off) 75'
CF	18	(Republic of Ireland) Dominic Foley (c)
LW	20	(Costa Rica) Bryan Ruiz
Substitutes:
MF	11	(Israel) Gil Vermuth		(substituted on) 75'
FW	30	(Slovenia) Zlatan Ljubijankič		(substituted on) 75'
MF	10	(Costa Rica) Randall Azofeifa		(substituted on) 86'
Manager:
(Norway) Trond Sollied

ANDERLECHT:
GK	13	(Belgium) Silvio Proto
RB	27	(Poland) Marcin Wasilewski		(substituted off) 64'
CB	26	(Argentina) Nicolás Pareja
CB	6	(Belgium) Jelle Van Damme
LB	3	(Belgium) Olivier Deschacht (c)	(yellow card) 75'
DM	5	(Argentina) Lucas Biglia
AM	30	(Belgium) Guillaume Gillet
CM	8	(Czech Republic) Jan Polák
RW	7	(Czech Republic) Stanislav Vlček		(substituted off) 46'
LW	11	(Morocco) Mbark Boussoufa	(yellow card) 83'
CF	29	(Argentina) Nicolás Frutos		(substituted off) 91'
Substitutes:
GK	1	(Czech Republic) Daniel Zítka
MF	14	(Belgium) Bart Goor		(substituted on) 91'
LW	36	(Belgium) Jonathan Legear
RW	12	(Belgium) Thomas Chatelle		(substituted on) 46'
MF	10	(Egypt) Ahmed Hassan	(yellow card) 73'	(substituted on) 64'
Manager:
(Belgium) Ariel Jacobs

Match rules

- 90 minutes
- 30 minutes of extra-time if necessary
- Penalty shoot-out if scores still level
- Five named substitutes
- Maximum of 3 substitutions
