= 2007 Belgian Cup final =

- Event: 2006–07 Belgian Cup
Club Brugge	Standard Liège
1	0
- Date: 26 May 2007
- Venue: King Baudouin Stadium, Brussels
- Referee: Peter Vervecken
- Attendance: 45,380

The 2007 Belgian Cup final, took place on 26 May 2007 between Club Brugge and Standard Liège. It was the 52nd Belgian Cup final and was won by Club Brugge with a goal by Manasseh Ishiaku.

== Route to the final ==
Club Brugge				Standard Liège
Opponent	Result	Legs	Round	Opponent	Result	Legs
Union SG	2–0	2–0 home	Sixth round	Eupen	6–1	6–1 home
Westerlo	1–0	1–0 home	Seventh round	Hamme	5–0	5–0 home
Kortrijk	3–2	2–1 home; 1–1 away	Quarter-finals	Antwerp	5–0	1–0 away; 4–0 home
Gent	3–3 (away goals)	1–3 away; 2–0 home	Semi-finals	Anderlecht	3–1	1–0 away; 2–1 home

== Match ==
=== Details ===
26 May 2007
20:45 CEST

Club Brugge	1–0	Standard Liège
Ishiaku 85'	Report

King Baudouin Stadium, Brussels
Attendance: 43,000
Referee: Peter Vervecken

Club Brugge	Standard Liège

GK	1	(Belgium) Stijn Stijnen	Booked
RB	24	(Denmark) Brian Priske
CB	26	(Belgium) Birger Maertens
CB	4	(Belgium) Joos Valgaeren
LB	5	(Canada) Michael Klukowski
RM	8	(Belgium) Gaëtan Englebert
CM	6	(Belgium) Philippe Clement (c)
CM	11	(Belgium) Jonathan Blondel	Booked
LM	18	(Croatia) Ivan Leko
CF	9	(Nigeria) Manasseh Ishiaku		(substituted off) 84'
CF	10	(Croatia) Boško Balaban		(substituted off) 89'
Substitutes:
GK	13	(Belgium) Glenn Verbauwhede
DF	17	(Serbia) Ivan Gvozdenović
MF	21	(Belgium) Jorn Vermeulen		(substituted on) 89'
FW	34	(Belgium) Jeanvion Yulu-Matondo		(substituted on) 84'
Manager:
(North Macedonia) Čedomir Janevski

GK	16	(Belgium) Olivier Renard
RB	2	(Belgium) Eric Deflandre		(substituted off) 74'
CB	19	(Senegal) Mohamed Sarr
CB	4	(Brazil) Dante	Booked
LB	14	(Morocco) Mustapha Oussalah		(substituted off) 46'
RW	7	(Portugal) Sérgio Conceição
CM	8	(Belgium) Steven Defour	Booked
CM	27	(Belgium) Marouane Fellaini	Booked
LW	28	(Belgium) Axel Witsel
RF	10	(Belgium) Igor de Camargo
LF	23	(Serbia) Milan Jovanović (c)
Substitutes:
FW	25	(Democratic Republic of the Congo) Ali Lukunku		(substituted on) 74'
DF	6	(Belgium) Frédéric Dupré		(substituted on) 46'
Manager:
(Belgium) Michel Preud'homme

Match rules

- 90 minutes.
- 30 minutes of extra time if necessary.
- Penalty shoot-out if scores still level.
- Seven named substitutes.
- Maximum of three substitutions.
