= 2019 Belgian Cup final =

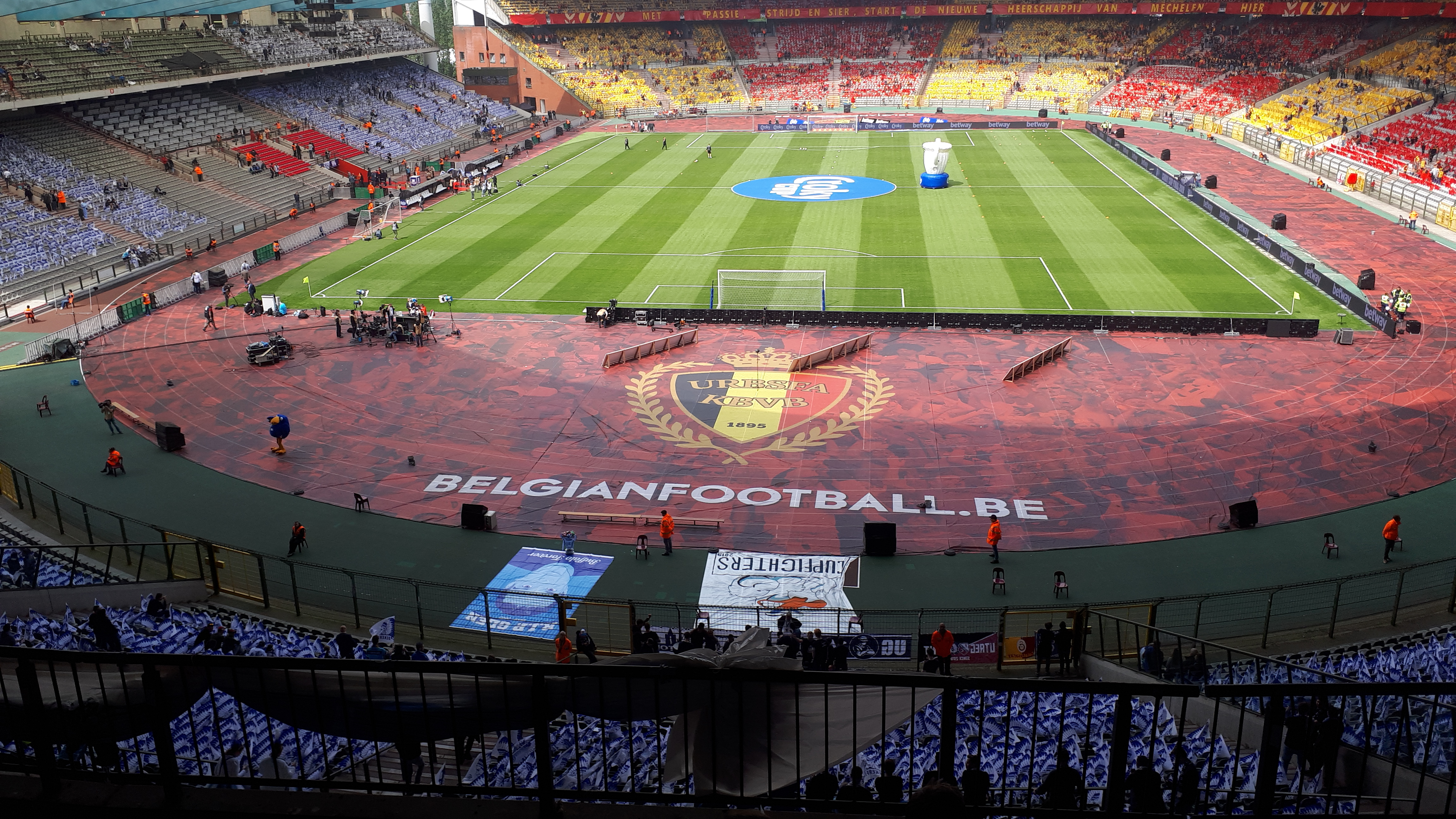
- Image before the kickoff
- Event: 2018–19 Belgian Cup
AA Gent	KV Mechelen
1	2
- Date: 1 May 2019
- Venue: King Baudouin Stadium, Brussels
- Man of the Match: Michael Verrips
- Referee: Erik Lambrechts
- Attendance: 44,771
- Weather: sunny

The 2019 Belgian Cup final, named Croky Cup after the sponsor, was the 64th Belgian Cup final and took place on 1 May 2019 between Gent and KV Mechelen. KV Mechelen was the first team from outside the top division to qualify for the cup final since the 2001 Belgian Cup Final when Belgian Second Division champions Lommel lost to Westerlo. KV Mechelen won the cup by two goals to one.

KV Mechelen qualified on 29 January 2019 and played its sixth final, losing on all previous occasions except for the 1987 Belgian Cup Final, where they beat RFC Liège by 1–0. Gent qualified one day later following a win on penalty kicks against Oostende. Gent played their fifth final, winning already on three occasions, most recently they won the 2010 Belgian Cup Final against Cercle Brugge with a convincing 3–0 result.

== Pre-match ==
=== Football fraud investigation ===
In the weeks prior the match, the 2017–18 Belgian football fraud investigation had come into full focus as KV Mechelen was being accused of match fixing, causing the Royal Belgian Football Association to penalise the team by not allowing them to promote (despite becoming champions in the 2018–19 Belgian First Division B just a few weeks earlier), prohibiting them to play European football for the coming season and deducting 12 points from the start of the 2019–20 season.

As the winner of the 2019 Belgian Cup Final qualifies for the group stage of the 2019–20 UEFA Europa League, a win by KV Mechelen would also impact the European places distribution and cause a scheduling problem, as in this case the third-placed team in the Championship play-offs would enter at this stage instead with all other European places shifting down accordingly. As a result, the fifth- rather than fourth-placed team from the Championship play-offs will have to play the Europa League play-off final against the winner of the Europa League play-offs, a match which is scheduled for 26 May 2019. The final ruling on the fraud investigation however is only scheduled for 27 and 28 May 2019, which could overturn the decision to prohibit KV Mechelen from playing in Europe.

=== Bad form ===
Besides the negative impact of the football fraud investigation, both teams went into the final in bad spell. KV Mechelen had not played a competitive match for over six weeks as their season had already ended mid-March when winning the promotion play-offs against Beerschot Wilrijk. On top of that their central midfielder Onur Kaya was unavailable due to yellow card suspension. Gent on the other hand was still active in the Championship play-offs, but had only obtained one single point out of their last six matches at the time of the cup final. Gent players Roman Yaremchuk (suspension) and Giorgi Chakvetadze (injury) were unavailable for the match.

== Route to the final ==
Gent					KV Mechelen
Opponent	Result	Legs	Scorers	Round	Opponent	Result	Legs	Scorers
bye				Fifth round	Albert Quévy-Mons (V)	2–0	2–0 home	Tainmont (2)
Virton (III)	4–2	4–2 away	Awoniyi (2), Limbombe (2)	Sixth round	Antwerp (I)	3–1	3–1 home	De Witte, Engvall, Van Damme
Beerschot Wilrijk (II)	3–0	3–0 home	Yaremchuk, Rosted, Chakvetadze	Seventh round	Lokeren (I)	2–0	2–0 home	Engvall, de Camargo
Sint-Truiden (I)	3–1	3–1 away	Dompé (2), Yaremchuk	Quarter-finals	Kortrijk (I)	3–0	3–0 home	Cocalić, Storm, de Camargo
Oostende (I)	4–4	2–2 home; 2–2 away (a.e.t.) (4–3 p)	Yaremchuk, Bronn; Sørloth, Bezus	Semi-finals	Union SG (II)	2–1	0–0 home; 2–1 away	de Camargo, Tainmont

== Match ==
=== Summary ===
Despite a sunny afternoon and a packed stadium, both clubs looked uninspired in the early stages of the match, with the first opportunity coming only after fifteen minutes as Jonathan David's shot tested KV Mechelen goalkeeper Michael Verrips a first time. With just over half an hour on the clock the match opened up, starting with a long range free kick by Nikola Storm, who surprised everyone by aiming straight for goal. His shot hit the post, with replays showing Gent goalkeeper Thomas Kaminski had deflected the ball with his fingertips first. Referee Erik Lambrechts had not noticed and thus did not award a corner kick, allowing Gent to launch a counter-attack from which they scored. Initial shots by Nana Asare and Birger Verstraete were blocked causing a scramble in front of the KV Mechelen goal before Jean-Luc Dompé was able to benefit and open the score. KV Mechelen, who were deemed underdogs, did not give up and managed to score just a few minutes later through Storm who volleyed in the equaliser, shooting the ball between the legs of Kaminski. Rob Schoofs had the opportunity to give KV Mechelen the lead just before the half-time break, but this time Kaminski was able to make a save.

In the second half, Gent had more possession of the ball but failed to created any chances. On the hour mark, Kaminksi misjudged a free-kick by Storm, allowing Germán Mera to score through a header to put KV Mechelen in the lead. Gent took the match in control from that point on, crossing many balls into the box, with Verrips required to make several key saves, blocking shots from Vadis Odjidja-Ofoe, Roman Bezus and Alexander Sørloth. Several players of KV Mechelen started suffering from cramps as they had not played any competitive match for over six weeks and the team came under severe pressure. With just minutes on the clock however, a breakaway ended in a one-on-one situation between Tim Matthys and Kaminski, but Matthys' shot was saved, handing Gent a lifeline. Odjidja-Ofoe however placed a large opportunity wide just before the final whistle, handing KV Mechelen a second Belgian Cup win.

With KV Mechelen on trial for alleged match-fixing as part of the 2017–18 Belgian football fraud investigation, it remained uncertain whether they would be allowed to take part in the 2019–20 UEFA Europa League group stage for which they would normally qualify by virtue of winning the cup. The club was eventually found guilty and the European ticket moved to the third-placed finisher in the 2018–19 Belgian First Division A Championship play-offs, Standard Liège.

=== Details ===
1 May 2019
14:30

Gent	1–2	KV Mechelen
Dompé 32'	report	Storm 38'; Mera 62'

King Baudouin Stadium, Brussels
Referee: Erik Lambrechts

Gent	Mechelen

GK	1	(Belgium) Thomas Kaminski
RB	2	(France) Arnaud Souquet		(substituted off) 64'
CB	28	(Tunisia) Dylan Bronn
CB	76	(Belgium) Timothy Derijck
LB	21	(Ghana) Nana Asare (c)	(yellow card) 90+3'
MF	10	(Norway) Alexander Sørloth
MF	8	(Belgium) Vadis Odjidja-Ofoe
FW	16	(Canada) Jonathan David		(substituted off) 68'
MF	6	(Belgium) Birger Verstraete	(yellow card) 43'
CF	11	(France) Jean-Luc Dompé
LW	13	(Georgia (country)) Giorgi Kvilitaia
Substitutes:
DF	4	(Norway) Sigurd Rosted
DF	5	(Ukraine) Ihor Plastun
FW	9	(Belgium) Stallone Limbombe
MF	18	(Ukraine) Roman Bezus		(substituted on) 68'
MF	19	(Belgium) Brecht Dejaegere		(substituted on) 64'
GK	20	(Belgium) Yannick Thoelen
DF	44	(Nigeria) Anderson Esiti
Manager:
(Denmark) Jess Thorup

GK	34	(Netherlands) Michael Verrips
RW	23	(France) Thibault Peyre	(yellow card) 69'	(substituted off) 71'
CB	5	(Netherlands) Arjan Swinkels
CB	6	(Colombia) Germán Mera
LB	3	(Netherlands) Lucas Bijker
CM	4	(Belgium) Seth De Witte (c)
CM	16	(Belgium) Rob Schoofs		(substituted off) 83'
CM	13	(Belgium) Joachim Van Damme	(yellow card) 81'
LW	11	(Belgium) Nikola Storm		(substituted off) 71'
CF	10	(Belgium) Igor de Camargo
RW	21	(France) Clément Tainmont
Substitutes:
GK	1	(Belgium) Bram Castro
MF	7	(Belgium) Tim Matthys		(substituted on) 83'
DF	19	(Belgium) Alec Van Hoorenbeeck
FW	20	(Sweden) Gustav Engvall		(substituted on) 71'
DF	22	(Belgium) Alexander Corryn		(substituted on) 71'
FW	29	(Ivory Coast) William Togui
FW	36	(Belgium) Mathieu Cornet
Manager:
(Belgium) Wouter Vrancken

Match rules

- 90 minutes.
- 30 minutes of extra time if necessary.
- Penalty shoot-out if scores still level.
- Seven named substitutes.
- Maximum of three substitutions.
