= Belgian Cup =

- Organiser(s): Royal Belgian Football Association; Pro League
- Founded: 1911; 115 years ago
- Region: Belgium
- Teams: c. 350
- Qualifier for: UEFA Europa League
- Domestic cup: Belgian Super Cup
- Current champions: Union Saint-Gilloise (4th title)
- Most championships: Club Brugge (12 titles)
- Broadcaster(s): Belgium; Play (Dutch); RTBF (French); Pickx+ Sports; Worldwide; DAZN
- Website: rbfa.be/cup
- 2026–27 Belgian Cup

The Belgian Cup (French: Coupe de Belgique; (Note: French pronunciation: [kup də bɛlʒik].) Dutch: Beker van België; (Note: Dutch pronunciation: [ˈbeːkər vɑm ˈbɛlɣijə].) German: Belgischer Fußballpokal (Note: German pronunciation: [ˈbɛlɡɪʃɐ ˈfuːsbalpoˌkaːl].)) is the main knockout football competition in Belgium, run by the Royal Belgian FA. The competition started in 1908 with provincial selections as the "Belgian Provinces Cup". Starting from 1912 only actual clubs were allowed to partake. As of 1964, the Belgian Cup has been organised annually. Since the 2015–16 edition, the Belgian Cup is called the Croky Cup, for sponsorship purposes. The final traditionally takes place at the King Baudouin Stadium in Brussels.

The most successful cup club is Club Brugge with 12 Belgian Cups in their possession. The current holders are Union Saint-Gilloise, having beaten Anderlecht 3–1 after extra time in the 2026 final. The winners are awarded a challenge cup and qualify for the UEFA Europa League and the Belgian Supercup.

== History ==
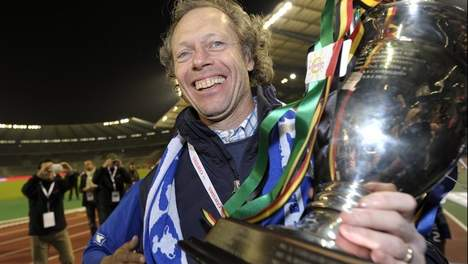
Michel Preud'homme holding the Belgian Cup after winning it with KAA Gent in 2010.

=== First national cup competitions ===
The first cup competition ever in Belgium was held in 1907–08 but the teams were not actual teams but were provincial selections. The winner would be awarded a silver trophy by prince Albert. Football was especially played in Brussels and Antwerp. In West and East Flanders, notably Bruges and Ghent, football was also becoming more and more loved. In Wallonia, football was adored around the city of Liège. The province of West Flanders won to that of Antwerp by 6–2. The next year, the province of Antwerp beat that of Brabant by 5–2. The cup was then suspended after two years.

In 1912, the Belgian Cup made a first return. This time only actual clubs from the two highest levels were allowed to partake. 16 clubs would fight for the Kings' Cup in a knockout competition. Racing Club de Bruxelles won the first Belgian Cup for clubs, after beating RC de Gand in the final. The competition would return the next year. This time, preliminary rounds would be organised so regional could partake as well. Union Saint-Gilloise would go on and win this edition's final after extra time. Having already won the national league three weeks before, the team became the first double winners in Belgian football history. They would end up winning the cup the following year as well.

During the First World War, no organised association football was played in Belgium. It would take until 1926–27 for the Belgian Cup to make its comeback. t's also the first time the competition is officially named the Belgian Cup. This edition would be won by R Cercle Sportif Brugeois, the first Flemish team to achieve this. They also won the national league, which made them the second team to win the Belgian double. Unfortunately, the cup fell into disgrace among the leading clubs at the time. During the interbellum the competition would only be organised one more time, in 1935–36. The 1944 edition was never finished.

In 1953, the Belgian Cup made another comeback. This edition of the cup would be won by Standard Liège, the first Walloon team to do so. Three years later, a poll was organized after which the Belgian cup was stopped once again.

=== Gateway to Europe ===
The foundation of the European Cup Winners' Cup is the main reason an annual cup tournament was brought back to life in 1963-1964. The first four editions of this European Cup had no Belgian participants due to the absence of a national cup.

Since 1964, the Belgian Cup winner would be qualified for the European Cup Winners' Cup, until its discontinuation in 1999. From then on, the cupholders would get a place in the UEFA cup, which became the UEFA Europa League in ten years later. Since 2021, the winner will enter the European competition in the play-off round. Because teams have to play a fewer number of games compared to the national league to get a European ticket, the Belgian Cup was nicknamed 'The quickest way to Europe'. This meant the top teams grew more interest in the national cup, which increased the prestige of the competition. Due to all of this, the traditional big three of Belgian football (FC Bruges, Anderlecht and Standard Liège) would win the cup the most times. The most successful cup club is Club Brugge KV with 12 cups followed by Anderlecht with 9 and Standard Liège with 8. Bruges would go on and win the double twice, in 1976–77 and 1995–96. Anderlecht has won one more, in 1964–65, 1971–72 and 1993–94. If the cup winner secures an equivalent or better (Champions League) European ticket through the league, the next available ticket in the league standings will be upgraded. In such a case, all subsequent tickets will also move up by one position.

KV Mechelen won the cup in 2019 as well as becoming champions in the First Division B, winning the small double. It was the second time a team from the second level won the cup and the first time it came with a European ticket. Due to being involved in a fraud scandal, the club wasn't allowed to enter the European competitions for a year. Their European ticket was passed on to Standard Liège based on the standings in the Jupiler Pro League. All the lower tickets were passed on as well. This meant that, of all teams, losing finalists KAA Gent got into the UEFA Europa League at the very last minute.

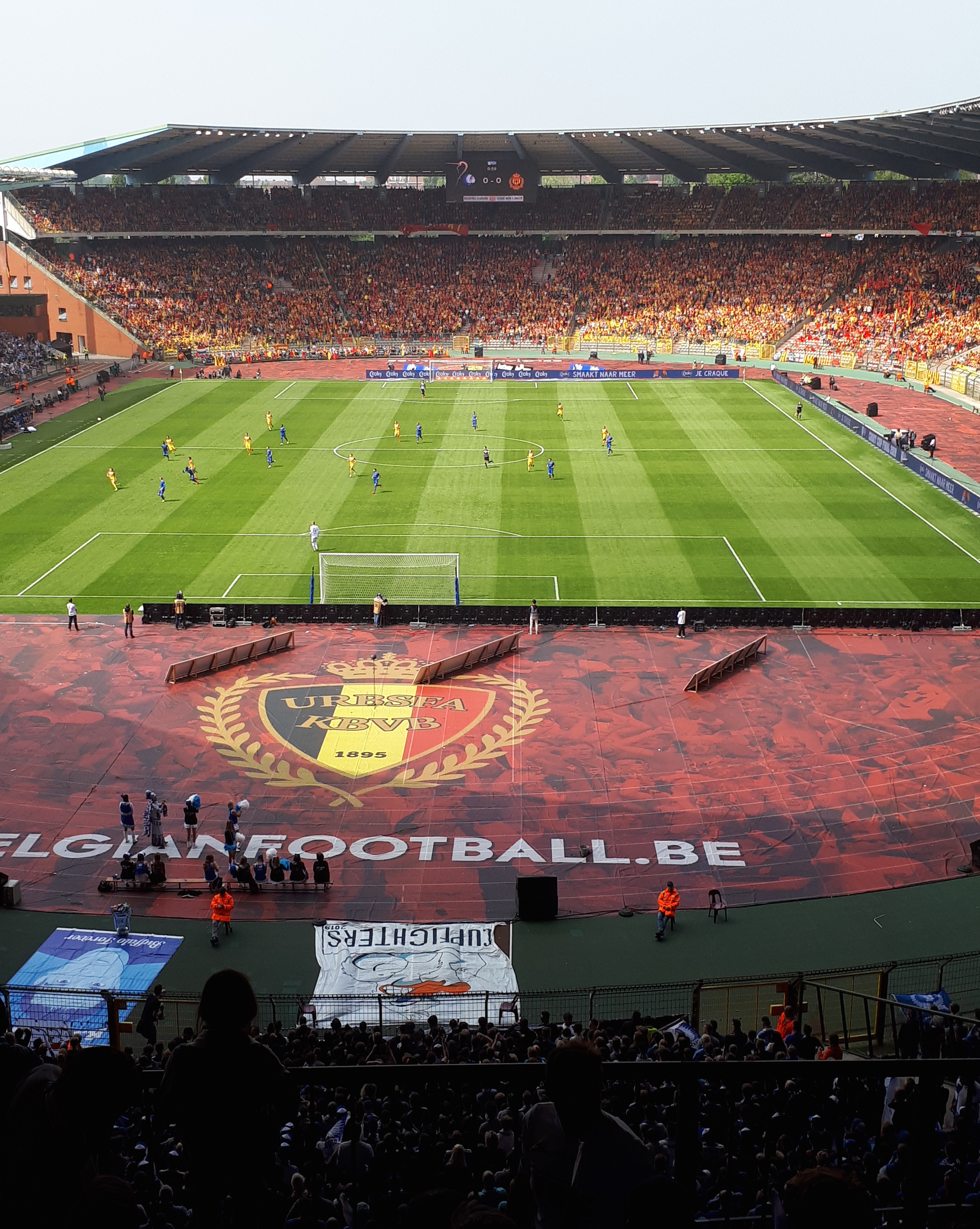
Picture taken during the 2019 final between Mechelen and Ghent.

=== Venues ===
The cup final is traditionally played in or around the capital. The editions before WWII were played in Jette, Uccle and Forest. The three finals in the 1950s were played in the Heysel Stadium in Brussels. Since the competitions annual return in 1964, this stadium has hosted the final. The only exceptions were between 1985 and 1987 and 1992–1995. During these years, the final was played four times in the Constant Vanden Stock Stadium in Anderlecht, twice in the Olympiastadion in Bruges and once in the Stade Maurice Dufrasne in Liège.

Venue	City	Finals
Heysel Stadium / King Baudouin Stadium	Brussels	1954–1956, 1964–1984, 1988–1991, 1996–present
Constant Vanden Stock Stadium	Anderlecht	1985, 1987, 1993, 1995
Maurice Dufrasne Stadium	Liège	1994
Olympic Stadium / Jan Breydel Stadium	Bruges	1986, 1992
Duden Park / Joseph Mariën Stadium	Forest	1927, 1935
Goose Pond Stadium	Uccle	1914
Joseph Bensstraat 124 (home of Union SG)	Uccle	1913
Jetsesteenweg 501 (home of Daring CB)	Jette	1912

=== Trophy ===
The first design was used for the three editions in the 1950s. Since 1964, a second design has been given to the cup winner. The ceremony takes place solely on the pitch and not on the grandstand. The winning team are entitled to keep the trophy for 11 months, until it's returned to the RBFA. This means the trophy is a real challenge cup and has gotten some bumps and scratches along the years. Every player and member of staff of the winning side is awarded a medal. Until the 2022 final, they got a minitature version of the trophy. The referees and losing side receive medals.

The current trophy features a silver loving-cup design. Ribbons in the victors' colors are tied along the ears. There's no real front or rear side, but a Dutch and French side. The Dutch side reads "Beker van België wisseltrofee aangeboden door dagblad Les Sports", the French side "Coupe de Belgique challenge offert par le journal Les Sports". Both statements have the same meaning and translate to "Belgian Cup challenge offered by newspaper Les Sports". Every victor since 1964 and the corresponding year are engraved on the cup as well.

Design used since 1964.

=== Naming ===
The first two editions of the Belgian Cup were played with provincial sides. During this time, the competition was called Belgian Provinces Cup (Beker der Belgische Provincies in Dutch, Coupe des Provinces Belges in French). The editions before World War 1 were known as the Kings' Cup (Beker van de Koning in Dutch, Coupe du Roi in French). Every edition of the cup after 1918 was called the Belgian Cup (Beker van België in Dutch, Coupe de Belgique in French).

In the 1995–96 season, a sponsored name was first introduced. Coca-Cola had bought the naming rights for five seasons, and named the competition the Coca-Cola Cup. There was no sponsored name between 2001 and 2007. In January 2008, the Belgian FA announced Cofidis had bought the naming rights for 300,000 euros. Eight editions of the Cofidis Cup would be played. After Club Bruges won their 11th cup in 2015, Croky became the new main sponsor of the tournament. The Belgian cup is called the Croky Cup to date.

Sponsored logo used between 2016 and 2022.

Year	Name
1908–1909	Belgian Provinces Cup
1912–1914	King's Cup
1927– now	Belgian Cup
Sponsored names
1996–2001	Coca-Cola Cup
2008–2015	Cofidis Cup
2016–present	Croky Cup

== Competition format ==
=== Overview ===
Beginning in July or August, the competition proceeds as a knockout tournament throughout, consisting of eight rounds, a semi-final and then a final. All teams playing at the national level of football (Levels 1 through 5) are expected to participate, together with the top teams from the Belgian Provincial Leagues. The provinces each receive a number of entries depending on their number of inhabitants. To determine which teams from each province can participate, each province can devise their own ruling, but commonly tickets are awarded to the best performing teams in each respective provincial cup tournament of the prior season, with any remaining tickets awarded to the highest finishing teams not already qualified in the highest provincial league. As a result, most teams from the Provincial Leagues participating in the Belgian Cup are playing in the top two provincial divisions, although each season a few teams from the lower divisions succeed in qualifying.

A system of byes ensures clubs above Level 5 enter the competition at later stages. In round 1 only, teams are grouped geographically prior to the draw to reduce travel costs for smaller teams. The clubs active in European football only enter the competition in round 7. Youth teams, active in level 4 to 2, are not allowed to compete. No seeding occurs. In rounds five through seven, in case an amateur team (Level 3 or below) is drawn against a professional team (Level 2 or above), the amateur team will always receive home advantage if their ground meets the regulation specifications. The final is played at the King Baudouin Stadium.

In the first three rounds, fixtures ending in a tie are decided by penalty kicks immediately, extra time is only played from round four onwards and possibly followed by penalty kicks if necessary. The semi-final round is the only round played over two legs; as such, extra time and penalty kicks can only occur in the return match. The away-goal-rule is not applied in the semi-finals.

=== Schedule ===
Qualified entrants from the provincial leagues (levels 6 through 9) begin the competition in the first round together with teams from the Belgian Third Amateur Division (level 5). Clubs from higher levels are then added in later rounds, as per the table below. The months in which rounds are played are traditional, with exact dates subject to each year's calendar.

Round	New entrants in this round	Month
Preliminary round	Level 6 through 9 clubs	July
Main tournament
First round	Level 5 through 9 clubs	August
Second round	Level 4 clubs	August
Third round	Level 3 clubs	August
Fourth round	none	August
Fifth round	Level 2 clubs	September
Round of 32	Level 1 clubs	October
Round of 16	Teams active in a European competition	November
Quarter-finals	none	December
Semi-finals	none	February or March (single leg)
Final	none	April

== Performance by club ==
Club	Wins	Last final won	Runners-up	Last final lost
Club Brugge	12	2025	8	2020
Anderlecht	9	2008	7	2026
Standard Liège	8	2018	10	2021
Genk	5	2021	1	2018
Gent	4	2022	2	2019
Antwerp	4	2023	2	2024
Union Saint-Gilloise	4	2026	0	—
Cercle Brugge	2	1985	5	2013
Mechelen	2	2019	5	2023
Beveren	2	1983	3	2004
Zulte Waregem	2	2017	1	2014
KSC Lokeren	2	2014	1	1981
Lierse	2	1999	1	1976
SV Thor Waterschei	2	1982	1	1955
K Beerschot VAC	2	1979	1	1968
Germinal Ekeren	1	1997	2	1995
KVC Westerlo	1	2001	1	2011
Liégeois	1	1990	1	1987
KSV Waregem	1	1974	1	1982
Daring Bruxelles	1	1935	1	1970
Germinal Beerschot	1	2005	0	—
La Louvière	1	2003	0	—
Racing Tournai	1	1956	0	—
Racing Bruxelles	1	1912	0	—
Excelsior Mouscron	0	—	2	2006
Sint-Truiden VV	0	—	2	2003
R Charleroi SC	0	—	2	1993
KV Oostende	0	—	1	2017
KV Kortrijk	0	—	1	2012
Lommel SK	0	—	1	2001
KSK Tongeren	0	—	1	1974
Racing White	0	—	1	1969
KFC Diest	0	—	1	1964
RCS Verviers	0	—	1	1956
KRC Mechelen	0	—	1	1954
K Lyra	0	—	1	1935
K Tubantia Borgerhout	0	—	1	1927
Racing Gand	0	—	1	1912

- italic clubs dissolved or merged

== Media coverage ==
=== Domestic coverage ===
The broadcasting rights for the Croky Cup are held by Eleven Sports. Due to the RBFA's obligation for cup games to be broadcast for free, Eleven does not air the matches on its own platforms. DPG Media selects and buys games to air on Flemish television (on VTM 2), and RTL does the same for the French Community (on Club RTL). DPG Media sells some games to Dutch-language public broadcaster VRT, which broadcasts these games on Sporza. The final is always broadcast on VTM 2 in Flanders.

Teams whose games have not been chosen for broadcasting are allowed to broadcast these games themselves. Regional broadcasters often try to buy the broadcasting rights to games between sides from that region, if DPG Media or RTL did not select those games..

From 2025–26, the FTA coverage of the tournament is broadcast by Dutch-language commercial television Play and French-language public broadcaster RTBF.

=== International coverage ===
Eleven Sports holds the rights for the First Division A, First Division B, Supercup and Women's Super League as well. This means that the international broadcasters are almost identical for the Belgian Cup.
