= 1995 Belgian Cup final =

- Event: 1994–95 Belgian Cup
Club Brugge	Germinal Ekeren
3	1
- Date: 28 May 1995
- Venue: Constant Vanden Stock Stadium, Anderlecht
- Referee: Guy Goethals
- Attendance: 18,500

The 1995 Belgian Cup final, took place on 28 May 1995 between Club Brugge and Germinal Ekeren. Club Brugge were the favorites and won its sixth Belgian Cup comfortably, by a score of 3–1. Germinal Ekeren appeared only for the second time, after first reaching the 1990 Belgian Cup final, which was also lost.

== Route to the final ==
Club Brugge				Germinal Ekeren
Opponent	Result	Legs	Round	Opponent	Result	Legs
RFC Liège (I)	5–0	5–0 home	Sixth round	Sint-Truiden (I)	0–0 (9–8 pen.)	0–0 away (9–8 pen.)
Gent (I)	4–0	4–0 home	Seventh round	Lierse (I)	2–0	2–0 home
Seraing (I)	2–1	2–1 away	Quarter-finals	Beveren (I)	2–0	2–0 away
Eendracht Aalst (I)	3–0	0–0 away, 3–0 home	Semi-finals	Anderlecht (I)	4–2	0–2 home, 4–0 away

== Match ==
=== Details ===
28 May 1995
16:00

Club Brugge	3–1	Germinal Ekeren
Claessens 26'; Vermant 41'; De Brul 84'		M'Ghoghi 68'

Constant Vanden Stock Stadium, Anderlecht
Attendance: 18,500
Referee: Guy Goethals

Club Brugge	Germinal Ekeren

GK	1	(Belgium) Dany Verlinden		(substituted off) 58'
RB	12	(Belgium) Tjörven De Brul
CB	7	(Australia) Paul Okon
CB	11	(Belgium) Pascal Renier
LB	5	(Belgium) Vital Borkelmans	Booked
RM	4	(Belgium) Gert Verheyen
CM	3	(Belgium) Franky Van der Elst (c)
CM	9	(Belgium) Lorenzo Staelens
LM	14	(Belgium) Gert Claessens		(substituted off) 76'
AM	8	(Belgium) Sven Vermant		(substituted off) 87'
CF	10	(Netherlands) René Eijkelkamp
Substitutes:
GK	13	(Belgium) Jürgen Belpaire		(substituted on) 58'
DF	15	(Belgium) Rudi Cossey		(substituted on) 87'
MF	6	(Belgium) Stéphane van der Heyden		(substituted on) 76'
Manager:
(Belgium) Hugo Broos

GK	1	(Belgium) Philippe Vande Walle (c)
RB	7	(Belgium) Rudy Janssens
CB	6	(Belgium) Mike Verstraeten
CB	5	(Hungary) Ervin Kovács
CB	9	(Belgium) Didier Dheedene
LB	2	(Belgium) Nick Descamps	(substituted off) 46'
CM	10	(Belgium) Gunther Hofmans
CM	8	(Morocco) Karim M'Ghoghi
CM	14	(Belgium) Simon Tahamata	(substituted off) 64'
CF	11	(Belgium) Jean-Marie Abeels
CF	13	(Canada) Tomasz Radzinski
Substitutes:
CF	12	(Belgium) Geert Berrevoets	(substituted on) 64'
CB	4	(Belgium) Patrick Ghislain	(substituted on) 46'
Manager:
(Belgium) Herman Helleputte

Match rules

- 90 minutes.
- 30 minutes of extra time if necessary.
- Penalty shoot-out if scores still level.
- Seven named substitutes.
- Maximum of three substitutions.
