= 1994 Belgian Cup final =

- Event: 1993–94 Belgian Cup
Anderlecht	Club Brugge
2	0
- Date: 22 May 1994
- Venue: Stade Maurice Dufrasne, Liège
- Referee: Léon Schelings
- Attendance: 17,660

The 1994 Belgian Cup final took place on 22 May 1994 between Anderlecht and Club Brugge. Anderlecht defeated Club Brugge 2–0. It was the 39th Belgian Cup final, and the second final in which Club Brugge and Anderlecht met each other. In 1977, Club Brugge defeated Anderlecht 4–3.

== Route to the final ==
Anderlecht				Club Brugge
Opponent	Result	Legs	Round	Opponent	Result	Legs
Gent	2–1	2–1 away	Round of 32	KV Mechelen	4–2	4–2 home
Harelbeke	3–1 (a.e.t.)	3–1 away	Round of 16	Standard Liège	3–2 (a.e.t.)	3–2 home
Beerschot	3–1	3–1 home	Quarter-finals	Antwerp	3–0	3–0 away
RWD Molenbeek	2–2 (a.g.)	0–0 home; 2–2 away	Semi-finals	Germinal Ekeren	7–1	4–0 home; 3–1 away

== Match ==
=== Summary ===
After a long battle with Club Brugge, Anderlecht had managed to win the 1993–94 Belgian First Division on the penultimate matchday. Club Brugge was left without a trophy but had a chance for revenge and a consolation prize with the cup final only a week after the end of the league. In the league, Club Brugge had not lost against Anderlecht (0-0 and 0–3) and was deemed slight favorite before the match.

Due to construction at the King Baudouin Stadium, the game was exceptionally played at the Stade Maurice Dufrasne in Liège.

Anderlecht, who were mainly dangerous on counterattacks, managed to score during the first half following a bad pass from Dirk Medved. Bruno Versavel rounded goalkeeper Dany Verlinden to open the scoring. After half time Lorenzo Staelens, who had scored a hattrick against Anderlecht in the league, scored an equalizer which was disallowed after an earlier foul by a teammate. Immediately thereafter Luc Nilis scored the 2–0 on assist from Bruno Versavel. No further goals were scored, allowing Anderlecht to win both league and cup for the third time in their history

=== Details ===
22 May 1994
16:00 CET

Anderlecht	2–0	Club Brugge
Versavel 36'; Nilis 74'

Stade Maurice Dufrasne, Liège
Attendance: 17,660
Referee: Léon Schelings

Anderlecht	Club Brugge

GK	1	(Belgium) Filip De Wilde
RB	2	(Belgium) Philip Haagdoren
CB	3	(Netherlands) Graeme Rutjes
CB	4	(Belgium) Philippe Albert	Booked
LB	5	(Belgium) Michel De Wolf
MF	11	(Belgium) Danny Boffin		(substituted off) 35'
MF	6	(Belgium) Marc Emmers
MF	8	(Belgium) Johan Walem
MF	7	(Belgium) Bruno Versavel
FW	9	(Netherlands) John Bosman		(substituted off) 86'
FW	10	(Belgium) Luc Nilis (c)
Substitutes:
GK		(Belgium) Peter Maes
CB		(Belgium) Bertrand Crasson	(substituted on) 35'
MF		(Sweden) Pär Zetterberg	(substituted on) 86'
MF		(Belgium) Frédéric Peiremans
FW		(Ghana) Yaw Preko
Manager:
(Netherlands) Johan Boskamp

GK	1	(Belgium) Dany Verlinden
RB	2	(Belgium) Dirk Medved		(substituted off) 72'
CB	3	(Belgium) Pascal Plovie
CB	4	(Australia) Paul Okon	Booked
LB	6	(Belgium) Pascal Renier
MF	5	(Belgium) Vital Borkelmans
MF	7	(Belgium) Gert Verheyen
MF	8	(Belgium) Franky Van der Elst (c)
MF	10	(Belgium) Lorenzo Staelens
FW	11	(Nigeria) Daniel Amokachi
FW	9	(Netherlands) René Eijkelkamp
Substitutes:
MF		(Belgium) Sven Vermant		(substituted on) 72'
Manager:
(Belgium) Hugo Broos

Linesmen:
(Belgium) Jean-Pierre Wauthelet
(Belgium) Marc Van den Broeck Assistant referee:
(Belgium) Robert Jeurissen

Match rules

- 90 minutes.
- 30 minutes of extra time if necessary.
- Penalty shoot-out if scores still level.
- Maximum of three substitutions.

== See also ==
- R.S.C. Anderlecht–Club Brugge KV rivalry
