= Belgium national football team results (2000–2009) =

- Win Draw Loss

In the 2000s, the Belgium national football team played at Euro 2000 (which Belgium co-hosted with The Netherlands) and at the 2002 World Cup. They did not qualify for any other major tournaments.

The overall match balance is positive with 39 wins versus 34 losses (and 25 draws).

== Results ==
Legend for encounters
| W.C. | FIFA World Cup |
| EURO | UEFA European Football Championship |
| Q | Qualification rounds |
| GS | Group Stage |
| 1/8 | Round of 16 (eighth-finals) |

98 official matches were played.

=== 2000 ===
| 23 February 2000 Friendly | Belgium | 1–1 | Portugal | Charleroi, Belgium |
| 20:45 UTC+1 | Strupar 56' | Report | Sá Pinto 80' | Stadium: Stade du Pays de Charleroi; Attendance: 24,000; Referee: Knud Erik Fisker (Denmark) |

| 29 March 2000 Friendly | Belgium | 2–2 | Netherlands | Brussels, Belgium |
| 20:30 UTC+2 | Verheyen 14'; Mpenza 26' | Report | Kluivert 33', 82' | Stadium: King Baudouin Stadium; Attendance: 46,400; Referee: Stefano Braschi (Italy) |

| 26 April 2000 Friendly | Norway | 0–2 | Belgium | Oslo, Norway |
| 19:45 UTC+2 | | Report | Verheyen 55', 90' | Stadium: Ullevaal Stadion; Attendance: 11,927; Referee: Mike McCurry (Scotland) |

| 3 June 2000 Friendly | Denmark | 2–2 | Belgium | Copenhagen, Denmark |
| 19:15 UTC+2 | Tomasson 36'; Schmeichel 61' (pen.) | Report | Staelens 52'; Wilmots 73' | Stadium: Telia Parken; Attendance: 26,993; Referee: Hellmut Krug (Germany) |

| 10 June 2000 2000 EURO GS | Belgium | 2–1 | Sweden | Brussels, Belgium |
| 20:45 UTC+2 | Goor 43'; Mpenza 46' | Report | Mjällby 52' | Stadium: King Baudouin Stadium; Attendance: 46,700; Referee: Markus Merk (Germany) |

| 14 June 2000 2000 EURO GS | Belgium | 0–2 | Italy | Brussels, Belgium |
| 20:45 UTC+2 | | Report | Totti 6'; Fiore 66' | Stadium: King Baudouin Stadium; Attendance: 44,500; Referee: José María García-Aranda (Spain) |

| 19 June 2000 2000 EURO GS | Belgium | 0–2 | Turkey | Brussels, Belgium |
| 20:45 UTC+2 | | Report | Şükür 45+2', 70' | Stadium: King Baudouin Stadium; Attendance: 43,000; Referee: Kim Milton Nielsen (Denmark) (Note: Nielsen suffered an injury in the 39th minute and was replaced by fourth official Günter Benkö (Austria).) |

| 16 August 2000 Friendly | Bulgaria | 1–3 | Belgium | Sofia, Bulgaria |
| 21:45 UTC+3 | Verheyen 16', 60'; Mpenza 29' | Report | Iliev 65' | Stadium: Georgi Asparuhov Stadium; Attendance: 1,500; Referee: Kyros Vassaras (Greece) |

| 2 September 2000 2002 W.C. Q | Belgium | 0–0 | Croatia | Brussels, Belgium |
| 20:00 UTC+2 | | Report | | Stadium: King Baudouin Stadium; Attendance: 27,510; Referee: Nikolay Levnikov (Russia) |

| 7 October 2000 2002 W.C. Q | Latvia | 0–4 | Belgium | Riga, Latvia |
| 20:15 UTC+3 | | Report | Wilmots 5'; Peeters 13'; Cavens 82'; Verheyen 90' | Stadium: Skonto Stadium; Attendance: 7,311; Referee: Leslie Irvine (Northern Ireland) |

=== 2001 ===
| 28 February 2001 2002 W.C. Q | Belgium | 10–1 | San Marino | Brussels, Belgium |
| 20:15 UTC+1 | Vanderhaeghe 10', 50'; Mpenza 13'; Goor 26', 60'; Baseggio 64'; Wilmots 72'; Peeters 76', 84', 88' | Report | Selva 90' | Stadium: King Baudouin Stadium; Attendance: 40,104; Referee: Sten Kaldma (Estonia) |

| 24 March 2001 2002 W.C. Q | Scotland | 2–2 | Belgium | Glasgow, Scotland |
| 20:15 UTC±0 | Dodds 2', 27' | Report | Wilmots 58'; Deflandre (red card) 27'; Van Buyten 90' | Stadium: Hampden Park; Attendance: 37,480; Referee: Kim Milton Nielsen (Denmark) |

| 25 April 2001 Friendly | Czech Republic | 1–1 | Belgium | Prague, Czech Republic |
| 20:30 UTC+2 | Baroš 82' | Report | Mpenza 10' | Stadium: Generali Arena; Attendance: 4,887; Referee: Darko Čeferin (Slovenia) |

| 2 June 2001 2002 W.C. Q | Belgium | 3–1 | Latvia | Brussels, Belgium |
| 20:00 UTC+2 | Wilmots 1', 50'; Mpenza 21' | Report | Pahars 51' | Stadium: King Baudouin Stadium; Attendance: 30,000; Referee: Ivan Dobrinov (Bulgaria) |

| 6 June 2001 2002 W.C. Q | San Marino | 1–4 | Belgium | Serravalle, San Marino |
| 20:30 UTC+2 | Selva 11' | Report | Wilmots 10', 90'; Verheyen 61' | Stadium: San Marino Stadium; Attendance: 1,538; Referee: Haim Jakov (Israel) |

| 15 August 2001 Friendly | Finland | 4–1 | Belgium | Helsinki, Finland |
| 19:00 UTC+3 | Forssell 2'; Kolkka 14'; Litmanen 30' (pen.); Tihinen 2' | Report | Goor 37' | Stadium: Finnair Stadium; Attendance: 9,250; Referee: Hartmut Strampe (Germany) |

| 5 September 2001 2002 W.C. Q | Belgium | 2–0 | Scotland | Brussels, Belgium |
| 20:15 UTC+2 | Van Kerckhoven 28'; Goor 90+3' | Report | | Stadium: King Baudouin Stadium; Attendance: 48,500; Referee: Manuel Enrique Mejuto Gonzáles (Spain) |

| 6 October 2001 2002 W.C. Q | Croatia | 1–0 | Belgium | Zagreb, Croatia |
| 18:00 UTC+2 | Bokšić 75' | Report | | Stadium: Stadion Maksimir; Attendance: 36,077; Referee: Hellmut Krug (Germany) |

| 10 November 2001 2002 W.C. Q PO | Belgium | 1–0 | Czech Republic | Brussels, Belgium |
| 20:15 UTC+2 | Verheyen 28' | Report | | Stadium: King Baudouin Stadium; Attendance: 42,000; Referee: Urs Meier (Switzerland) |

| 14 November 2001 2002 W.C. Q PO | Czech Republic | 0–1 (0–2 agg.) | Belgium | Prague, Czech Republic |
| 20:15 UTC+2 | | Report | Verheyen 28' | Stadium: Generali Arena; Attendance: 18,996; Referee: Anders Frisk (Sweden) |

=== 2002 ===
| 13 February 2002 Friendly | Belgium | 1–0 | Norway | Brussels, Belgium |
| 20:15 UTC+2 | Tanghe 82' | Report | | Stadium: King Baudouin Stadium; Attendance: 17,0000; Referee: Joaquim Paulo Paraty da Silva (Portugal) |

| 27 March 2002 Friendly | Greece | 3–2 | Belgium | Patras, Greece |
| 19:15 UTC+2 | Tsiartas 61' (pen.); Vryzas 80', 87' | Report | Goor 29'; Sonck 55' | Stadium: Kostas Davourlis Stadium; Attendance: 11,500; Referee: Costas Kapitanis (Cyprus) |

| 17 April 2002 Friendly | Belgium | 1–1 | Slovakia | Brussels, Belgium |
| 20:15 UTC+2 | Goor 55' | Report | Janocko 83' | Stadium: King Baudouin Stadium; Attendance: 18,000; Referee: Bruno Coué (France) |

| 14 May 2002 Friendly | Belgium | 0–0 | Algeria | Brussels, Belgium |
| 20:15 UTC+2 | | Report | | Stadium: King Baudouin Stadium; Attendance: 20,000; Referee: René Rogalla (Switzerland) |

| 18 May 2002 Friendly | France | 1–2 | Belgium | Saint-Denis, France |
| 20:45 UTC+2 | Leboeuf 39' | Report | De Boeck 20'; Wilmots 90' | Stadium: Stade de France; Attendance: 79,056; Referee: Valentin Ivanov (Russia) |

| 26 May 2002 Friendly | Belgium | 1–0 | Costa Rica | Kumamoto, Japan |
| 14:00 UTC+9 | Goor 23' | Report | | Stadium: Umakana Yokana Stadium; Attendance: 20,769; Referee: Matsuzaki Yasuhiro (Japan) |

| 4 June 2002 2002 W.C. GS | Japan | 2–2 | Belgium | Saitama, Japan |
| 18:00 UTC+9 | Suzuki 59'; Inamoto 67' | Report | Wilmots 57'; Van der Heyden 75' | Stadium: Saitama Stadium 2002; Attendance: 55,256; Referee: William Mattus (Costa Rica) |

| 10 June 2002 2002 W.C. GS | Tunisia | 1–1 | Belgium | Ōita, Japan |
| 18:00 UTC+9 | Bouzaiene 17' | Report | Wilmots 13' | Stadium: Ōita Stadium Big Eye; Attendance: 39,700; Referee: Mark Shield (Australia) |

| 14 June 2002 2002 W.C. GS | Belgium | 3–2 | Russia | Fukuroi, Japan |
| 15:30 UTC+9 | Walem 7'; Sonck 78'; Wilmots 82' | Report | Beschastnykh 52'; Sychev 88' | Stadium: Shizuoka Stadium Ecopa; Attendance: 46,640; Referee: Kim Milton Nielsen (Denmark) |

| 17 June 2002 2002 W.C. 1/8 | Brazil | 2–0 | Belgium | Kobe, Japan |
| 20:30 UTC+9 | Rivaldo 67'; Ronaldo 87' | Report | | Stadium: Kobe Wing Stadium; Attendance: 40,440; Referee: Peter Prendergast (Jamaica) |

| 21 August 2002 Friendly | Poland | 1–1 | Belgium | Szczecin, Poland |
| 20:00 UTC+2 | Żurawski 4' | Report | Sonck 41' | Stadium: Stadion Miejski; Attendance: 19,000; Referee: Martin Ingvarsson (Sweden) |

| 7 September 2002 2004 EURO Q | Belgium | 0–2 | Bulgaria | Brussels, Belgium |
| 20:00 UTC+2 | | Report | Janković 16'; Petrov 63' | Stadium: King Baudouin Stadium; Attendance: 25,000; Referee: Terje Hauge (Norway) |

| 12 October 2002 2004 EURO Q | Andorra | 0–1 | Belgium | Andorra la Vella, Andorra |
| 20:00 UTC+2 | | Report | Sonck 61' | Stadium: Estadi Comunal d'Andorra la Vella; Attendance: 700; Referee: Karen Nalbandyan (Armenia) |

| 16 October 2002 2004 EURO Q | Estonia | 0–1 | Belgium | Tallinn, Estonia |
| 20:30 UTC+2 | | Report | Sonck 2' | Stadium: A. Le Coq Arena; Attendance: 3,900; Referee: Mike Riley (England) |

=== 2003 ===
| 12 February 2003 Friendly | Algeria | 1–3 | Belgium | Annaba, Algeria |
| 18:30 UTC±0 | Belmadi 89' | Report | Mpenza 2', 57'; Sonck 7' | Stadium: Stade 19 Mai 1956; Attendance: 40,000; Referee: Jamel Baraket (Tunisia) |

| 29 March 2003 2004 EURO Q | Croatia | 4–0 | Belgium | Zagreb, Croatia |
| 18:30 UTC+1 | Srna 9'; Pršo 53'; Marić 68'; Leko 76' | Report | | Stadium: Stadion Maksimir; Attendance: 18,117; Referee: Herbert Fandel (Germany) |

| 30 April 2003 Friendly | Belgium | 3–1 | Poland | Brussels, Belgium |
| 20:30 UTC+2 | Sonck 28'; Buffel 55'; Soetaers 85' | Report | Krzynówek 80' | Stadium: King Baudouin Stadium; Attendance: 27,000; Referee: Douglas McDonald (Scotland) |

| 7 June 2003 2004 EURO Q | Bulgaria | 2–2 | Belgium | Sofia, Bulgaria |
| 19:15 UTC+1 | Berbatov 52'; Todorov 71' (pen.) | Report | Petrov 31' (o.g.); Clement 56' | Stadium: Vasil Levski National Stadium; Attendance: 42,099; Referee: Pierluigi Collina (Italy) |

| 11 June 2003 2004 EURO Q | Belgium | 3–0 | Andorra | Ghent, Belgium |
| 20:15 UTC+2 | Goor 21', 69'; Sonck 44' | Report | | Stadium: Jules Ottenstadion; Attendance: 12,500; Referee: Syarhey Shmolik (Belarus) |

| 20 August 2003 Friendly | Belgium | 1–1 | Netherlands | Brussels, Belgium |
| 20:15 UTC+2 | Sonck 40' | Report | Makaay 52' | Stadium: King Baudouin Stadium; Attendance: 32,000; Referee: Herbert Fandel (Germany) |

| 10 September 2003 2004 EURO Q | Belgium | 2–1 | Croatia | Brussels, Belgium |
| 20:15 UTC+2 | Sonck 34', 42' | Report | Šimić 37' | Stadium: King Baudouin Stadium; Attendance: 30,000; Referee: Graham Poll (Poland) |

| 11 October 2003 2004 EURO Q | Belgium | 2–0 | Estonia | Liège, Belgium |
| 20:15 UTC+2 | Reinumäe 45' (o.g.); Buffel 60' | Report | | Stadium: Stade Maurice Dufrasne; Attendance: 20,000; Referee: Massimo Busacca (Switzerland) |

=== 2004 ===
| 18 February 2004 Friendly | Belgium | 0–2 | France | Brussels, Belgium |
| 20:15 UTC+1 | | Report | Govou 45+1'; Saha 76' | Stadium: King Baudouin Stadium; Attendance: 43,160; Referee: Mark Halsey (England) |

| 31 March 2004 Friendly | Germany | 3–0 | Belgium | Cologne, Germany |
| 20:30 UTC+2 | Kurányi 45'; Hamann 55'; Ballack 81' | Report | | Stadium: RheinEnergieStadion; Attendance: 46,143; Referee: Jan Wegereef (Germany) |

| 28 April 2004 Friendly | Belgium | 2–3 | Turkey | Brussels, Belgium |
| 20:15 UTC+2 | Sonck 33'; Dufer 85' | Report | Baştürk 43'; Seyhan 68'; Karadeniz 90' | Stadium: King Baudouin Stadium; Attendance: 20,000; Referee: Dick van Egmond (Netherlands) |

| 29 May 2004 Friendly | Netherlands | 0–1 | Belgium | Eindhoven, Netherlands |
| 20:30 UTC+2 | | Report | Goor 78' (pen.) | Stadium: Philips Stadion; Attendance: 34,000; Referee: Claude Colombo (France) |

| 18 August 2004 Friendly | Norway | 2–2 | Belgium | Oslo, Norway |
| 19:00 UTC+2 | Buffel 25', 34' | Report | Johnsen 32'; Riseth 59' | Stadium: Ullevaal Stadion; Attendance: 16,669; Referee: Krzysztof Słupik (Poland) |

| 4 September 2004 2006 W.C. Q | Belgium | 1–1 | Lithuania | Charleroi, Belgium |
| 20:15 UTC+2 | Sonck 61' | Report | Jankauskas 72' | Stadium: Stade du Pays de Charleroi; Attendance: 19,218; Referee: Loizos Loizou (Cyprus) |

| 9 October 2004 2006 W.C. Q | Spain | 2–0 | Belgium | Santander, Spain |
| 21:15 UTC+2 | Luque 58'; Raúl 81' | Report | | Stadium: Estadio El Sardinero; Attendance: 17,000; Referee: Kim Milton Nielsen (Denmark) |

| 17 November 2004 2006 W.C. Q | Belgium | 0–2 | Serbia and Montenegro | Brussels, Belgium |
| 20:15 UTC+1 | | Report | Vukić 10'; Kežman 60' | Stadium: King Baudouin Stadium; Attendance: 28,350; Referee: Peter Fröjdfeldt (Sweden) |

=== 2005 ===
| 9 February 2005 Friendly | Egypt | 4–0 | Belgium | Cairo, Egypt |
| 20:45 UTC+2 | Moteab 40', 51'; Malek 53'; Hosny 80' | Report | | Stadium: Cairo Military Academy Stadium; Attendance: 5,000; Referee: Reda El Beltagy (Egypt) |

| 26 March 2005 2006 W.C. Q | Belgium | 4–1 | Bosnia and Herzegovina | Brussels, Belgium |
| 20:15 UTC+1 | E. Mpenza 15', 54'; Daerden 44'; Buffel 76' | Report | Bolić 40' | Stadium: King Baudouin Stadium; Attendance: 36,700; Referee: Vladimír Hriňák (Slovakia) |

| 30 March 2005 2006 W.C. Q | San Marino | 1–2 | Belgium | Serravalle, San Marino |
| 20:30 UTC+2 | Selva 41' | Report | Simons 18' (pen.); Van Buyten 63' | Stadium: Stadio Olimpico; Attendance: 871; Referee: Giorgos Kasnaferis (Greece) |

| 4 June 2005 2006 W.C. Q | Serbia and Montenegro | 0–0 | Belgium | Belgrade, Serbia and Montenegro |
| 20:15 UTC+2 | | Report | | Stadium: Stadion Crvene Zvezde; Attendance: 16,662; Referee: Valentin Ivanov (Russia) |

| 17 August 2005 Friendly | Belgium | 2–0 | Greece | Brussels, Belgium |
| 20:15 UTC+2 | E. Mpenza 19'; M. Mpenza 63' | Report | | Stadium: King Baudouin Stadium; Attendance: 20,000; Referee: Espen Berntsen (Norway) |

| 3 September 2005 2006 W.C. Q | Bosnia and Herzegovina | 1–0 | Belgium | Zenica, Bosnia and Herzegovina |
| 20:15 UTC+2 | Barbarez 19' | Report | | Stadium: Bilino Polje Stadium; Attendance: 12,000; Referee: Olegário Benquerença (Portugal) |

| 7 September 2005 2006 W.C. Q | Belgium | 8–0 | San Marino | Antwerp, Belgium |
| 20:30 UTC+2 | Simons 34'; Daerden 39', 67'; Buffel 44'; Mbo Mpenza 52', 71'; Vandenbergh 53'; Van Buyten 83' | Report | | Stadium: Olympisch Stadion; Attendance: 8,207; Referee: Ian Stokes (Republic of Ireland) |

| 8 October 2005 2006 W.C. Q | Belgium | 0–2 | Spain | Brussels, Belgium |
| 20:45 UTC+2 | | Report | Torres 56', 59' | Stadium: King Baudouin Stadium; Attendance: 40,300; Referee: Ľuboš Micheľ (Slovakia) |

| 12 October 2005 2006 W.C. Q | Lithuania | 1–1 | Belgium | Vilnius, Lithuania |
| 21:30 UTC+3 | Deschacht 82' (o.g.); Semberas (red card) 83' | Report | Geraerts 20' | Stadium: Vėtra Stadium; Attendance: 1,500; Referee: Mike Riley (England) |

=== 2006 ===
| 1 March 2006 Friendly | Luxembourg | 0–2 | Belgium | Luxembourg City, Luxembourg |
| 20:15 UTC+1 | | Report | Vandenbergh 43'; Pieroni 62' | Stadium: Stade Josy Barthel; Attendance: 1,500; Referee: Thomas Einwaller (Austria) |

| 11 May 2006 Friendly | Saudi Arabia | 1–2 | Belgium | Sittard, Netherlands |
| 20:15 UTC+2 | Goor 31' (o.g.) | Report | Caluwé 3'; Vanden Borre 55' | Stadium: Wagner & Partners Stadion; Attendance: 3,283; Referee: Ruud Bossen (Netherlands) |

| 20 May 2006 Friendly | Slovakia | 1–1 | Belgium | Trnava, Slovakia |
| 19:00 UTC+2 | Hološko 65' | Report | Geraerts 77' | Stadium: Štadión Antona Malatinského; Attendance: 4,174; Referee: Viktor Kassai (Hungary) |

| 24 May 2006 Friendly | Belgium | 3–3 | Turkey | Genk, Belgium |
| 20:30 UTC+2 | Toraman 28' (o.g.); Sonck 43'; Hoefkens 88' | Report | Ateş 2'; Kabze 27'; Şanlı 75' | Stadium: Fenix Stadion; Attendance: 8,000; Referee: Fritz Stuchlik (Austria) |

| 16 August 2006 2008 EURO Q | Belgium | 0–0 | Kazakhstan | Anderlecht, Belgium |
| 19:45 UTC+2 | | Report | | Stadium: Constant Vanden Stock Stadium; Attendance: 15,495; Referee: Mark Courtney (Northern Ireland) |

| 6 September 2006 2008 EURO Q | Armenia | 0–1 | Belgium | Yerevan, Armenia |
| 21:00 UTC+5 | | Report | Van Buyten 41' | Stadium: Vazgen Sargsyan Republican Stadium; Attendance: 4,122; Referee: Gerald Lehner (Austria) |

| 7 October 2006 2008 EURO Q | Serbia | 1–0 | Belgium | Belgrade, Serbia |
| 20:15 UTC+2 | Žigić 54' | Report | | Stadium: Red Star Stadium; Attendance: 16,901; Referee: Domenico Messina (Italy) |

| 11 October 2006 2008 EURO Q | Belgium | 3–0 | Azerbaijan | Anderlecht, Belgium |
| 20:45 UTC+2 | Simons 24' (pen.); Vandenbergh 47'; Dembélé 82' | Report | | Stadium: Constant Vanden Stock Stadium; Attendance: 11,917; Referee: Romans Lajuks (Latvia) |

| 15 November 2006 2008 EURO Q | Belgium | 0–1 | Poland | Brussels, Belgium |
| 20:30 UTC+1 | | Report | Matusiak 19' | Stadium: King Baudouin Stadium; Attendance: 37,578; Referee: Stuart Dougal (Scotland) |

=== 2007 ===
| 7 February 2007 Friendly | Belgium | 0–2 | Czech Republic | Brussels, Belgium |
| 20:45 UTC+1 | | Report | Koller 6'; Kulič 75' | Stadium: King Baudouin Stadium; Attendance: 26,000; Referee: Jacek Granat (Poland) |

| 24 March 2007 2008 EURO Q | Portugal | 4–0 | Belgium | Lisbon, Portugal |
| 21:00 UTC+0 | Nuno Gomes 53'; Ronaldo 55', 75'; Quaresma 68' | Report | | Stadium: Estádio José Alvalade; Attendance: 47,009; Referee: Kyros Vassaras (Greece) |

| 2 June 2007 2008 EURO Q | Belgium | 1–2 | Portugal | Brussels, Belgium |
| 20:45 UTC+2 | Fellaini 55' | Report | Nani 43'; Postiga 64' | Stadium: King Baudouin Stadium; Attendance: 45,383; Referee: Martin Hansson (Sweden) |

| 6 June 2007 2008 EURO Q | Finland | 2–0 | Belgium | Helsinki, Finland |
| 20:15 UTC+3 | Johansson 27'; A. Eremenko 71' | Report | | Stadium: Helsinki Olympic Stadium; Attendance: 34,818; Referee: Mike Riley (England) |

| 22 August 2007 2008 EURO Q | Belgium | 3–2 | Serbia | Brussels, Belgium |
| 20:45 UTC+2 | Dembélé 10', 88'; Mirallas 30' | Report | Kuzmanović 73', 90+1' | Stadium: King Baudouin Stadium; Attendance: 19,202; Referee: Terje Hauge (Norway) |

| 12 September 2007 2008 EURO Q | Kazakhstan | 2–2 | Belgium | Almaty, Kazakhstan |
| 21:00 UTC+6 | Byakov 39'; Smakov 77' (pen.) | Report | Geraerts 13'; Mirallas 24' | Stadium: Almaty Central Stadium; Attendance: 18,100; Referee: Alexandru Tudor (Romania) |

| 13 October 2007 2008 EURO Q | Belgium | 0–0 | Finland | Brussels, Belgium |
| 20:45 UTC+2 | | Report | | Stadium: King Baudouin Stadium; Attendance: 21,393; Referee: Costas Kapitanis (Cyprus) |

| 17 October 2007 2008 EURO Q | Belgium | 3–0 | Armenia | Brussels, Belgium |
| 20:45 UTC+2 | Sonck 63'; Dembélé 69'; Geraerts 76' | Report | | Stadium: King Baudouin Stadium; Attendance: 14,812; Referee: Johannes Valgeirsson (Iceland) |

| 17 November 2007 2008 EURO Q | Poland | 2–0 | Belgium | Chorzów, Poland |
| 20:30 UTC+1 | Smolarek 45', 49' | Report | | Stadium: Silesian Stadium; Attendance: 41,450; Referee: Claus Bo Larsen (Denmark) |

| 21 November 2007 2008 EURO Q | Azerbaijan | 0–1 | Belgium | Baku, Azerbaijan |
| 21:00 UTC+4 | | Report | Pieroni 52' | Stadium: Tofiq Bahramov Republican Stadium; Attendance: 7,000; Referee: Asaf Kenan (Israel) |

=== 2008 ===
| 26 March 2008 Friendly | Belgium | 1–4 | Morocco | Brussels, Belgium |
| 20:45 UTC+2 | Witsel 50' | Report | Alloudi 14'; Sektioui 34'; El Zhar 85'; Benjelloun 89' | Stadium: King Baudouin Stadium; Attendance: 24,000; Referee: Bas Nijhuis (Netherlands) |

| 30 May 2008 Friendly | Italy | 3–1 | Belgium | Florence, Italy |
| 20:50 UTC+2 | Di Natale 9', 41'; Camoranesi 49' | Report | Sonck 90+2' | Stadium: Stadio Artemio Franchi; Attendance: 12,500; Referee: Martin Atkinson (England) |

| 20 August 2008 Friendly | Germany | 2–0 | Belgium | Nuremberg, Germany |
| 21:00 UTC+2 | Schweinsteiger 59' (pen.); Marin 77' | Report | | Stadium: easyCredit-Stadion; Attendance: 34,117; Referee: Thomas Vejlgaard (Denmark) |

| 6 September 2008 2010 W.C. Q | Belgium | 3–2 | Estonia | Liège, Belgium |
| 20:45 UTC+2 | Sonck 39', 81'; Defour 75' | Report | Zenjov 57'; Oper 90+2' | Stadium: Stade Maurice Dufrasne; Attendance: 17,992; Referee: Mike Dean (England) |

| 10 September 2008 2010 W.C. Q | Turkey | 1–1 | Belgium | Istanbul, Turkey |
| 21:00 UTC+3 | Belözoğlu 74' (pen.) | | Sonck 32' | Stadium: Şükrü Saracoğlu Stadium; Attendance: 34,097; Referee: Stéphane Lannoy (France) |

| 11 October 2008 2010 W.C. Q | Belgium | 2–0 | Armenia | Brussels, Belgium |
| 20:45 UTC+2 | Sonck 21'; Fellaini 37' | Report | | Stadium: King Baudouin Stadium; Attendance: 20,949; Referee: Peter Rasmussen (Denmark) |

| 15 October 2008 2010 W.C. Q | Belgium | 1–2 | Spain | Brussels, Belgium |
| 20:45 UTC+2 | Sonck 7' | Report | Iniesta 36'; Villa 88' | Stadium: King Baudouin Stadium; Attendance: 45,888; Referee: Tom Henning Øvrebø (Norway) |

| 19 November 2008 Friendly | Luxembourg | 1–1 | Belgium | Luxembourg City, Luxembourg |
| 20:30 UTC+1 | Mutsch 46' | Report | Mirallas 22' | Stadium: Stade Josy Barthel; Attendance: 4,172; Referee: Mike Riley (England) |

=== 2009 ===
| 11 February 2009 Friendly | Belgium | 2–0 | Slovenia | Genk, Belgium |
| 20:45 UTC+1 | Van Buyten 20', 85' | Report | | Stadium: Cristal Arena; Attendance: 13,135; Referee: Sascha Kever (Switzerland) |

| 28 March 2009 2010 W.C. Q | Belgium | 2–4 | Bosnia and Herzegovina | Genk, Belgium |
| 20:45 UTC+1 | Dembélé 66'; Sonck 85' (pen.) | Report | Džeko 7'; Jahić 75'; Bajramović 77'; Misimović 81' | Stadium: Fenix Stadion; Attendance: 20,041; Referee: Nikolai Ivanov (Russia) |

| 1 April 2009 2010 W.C. Q | Bosnia and Herzegovina | 2–1 | Belgium | Zenica, Bosnia and Herzegovina |
| 20:45 UTC+2 | Džeko 12', 14' | | Swerts 88' | Stadium: Bilino Polje Stadium; Attendance: 13,800; Referee: Vladimír Hriňák (Slovakia) |

| 29 May 2009 Kirin Cup | Chile | 1–1 | Belgium | Chiba, Japan |
| 19:00 UTC+9 | Medel 23' | Report | Roelandts 17' | Stadium: Fukuda Denshi Arena; Attendance: 6,050; Referee: Minoru Tōjō (Japan) |

| 31 May 2009 Kirin Cup | Japan | 4–0 | Belgium | Tokyo, Japan |
| 19:20 UTC+9 | Nagatomo 21'; K. Nakamura 23'; Okazaki 60'; Yano 70' | Report | | Stadium: National Stadium; Attendance: 42,520; Referee: Rob Styles (England) |

| 12 August 2009 Friendly | Czech Republic | 3–1 | Belgium | Teplice, Czech Republic |
| 17:20 UTC+2 | Hubník 27'; Baroš 42' (pen.); Rozehnal 78' | Report | Vertonghen 12' | Stadium: Na Stínadlech; Attendance: 13,890; Referee: Peter Sippel (Germany) |

| 5 September 2009 2010 W.C. Q | Spain | 5–0 | Belgium | A Coruña, Spain |
| 22:00 UTC+2 | Silva 41', 67'; Villa 49', 85'; Piqué 50' | Report | | Stadium: Estadio Riazor; Attendance: 30,441; Referee: Bertrand Layec (France) |

| 9 September 2009 2010 W.C. Q | Armenia | 2–1 | Belgium | Yerevan, Armenia |
| 21:00 UTC+5 | Goharyan 23'; Hovsepyan 50' | Report | Van Buyten 90+2' | Stadium: Hanrapetakan Stadium; Attendance: 2,300; Referee: Ljubomir Krstevski (Macedonia) |

| 10 October 2009 2010 W.C. Q | Belgium | 2–0 | Turkey | Brussels, Belgium |
| 20:45 UTC+2 | Mpenza 8', 84' | Report | | Stadium: King Baudouin Stadium; Attendance: 30,131; Referee: Matteo Trefoloni (Italy) |

| 14 October 2009 2010 W.C. Q | Estonia | 2–0 | Belgium | Tallinn, Estonia |
| 21:30 UTC+3 | Piiroja 30'; Vassiljev 67' | Report | | Stadium: Lilleküla Stadium; Attendance: 4,680; Referee: Nicolai Vollquartz (Denmark) |

| 14 November 2009 Friendly | Belgium | 3–0 | Hungary | Ghent, Belgium |
| 20:45 UTC+1 | Fellaini 38'; Vermaelen 56'; Mirallas 61' (pen.) | Report | | Stadium: Jules Ottenstadion; Attendance: 8,000; Referee: Hervé Piccirillo (France) |

| 17 November 2009 Friendly | Qatar | 0–2 | Belgium | Sedan, France |
| 20:00 UTC+1 | | Report | Witsel 20'; Sonck 54' | Stadium: Stade Louis Dugauguez; Attendance: 3,000; Referee: Ruddy Buquet (France) |
