= Adékambi Olufadé =

Togolese footballer

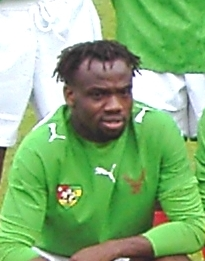

Personal information
- Full name: Adékambi Olufadé
- Date of birth: 7 January 1980 (age 46)
- Place of birth: Lomé, Togo
- Height: 1.70 m (5 ft 7 in)
- Position: Forward

Senior career*
Years	Team	Apps	(Gls)
1998–2000	Dynamic Togolais	?	(?)
2000	Satellite FC	?	(?)
2000–2001	KSC Lokeren	13	(7)
2001–2002	OSC Lille	11	(1)
2002–2003	OGC Nice	18	(2)
2003–2004	R. Charleroi S.C.	24	(7)
2004–2005	OSC Lille	0	(0)
2005–2006	Al-Siliya		
2006	Emirates Club		
2006–2010	K.A.A. Gent	70	(33)
2010–2011	R. Charleroi S.C.	5	(0)

International career^{‡}
1997–2010	Togo	38	(9)
- * Club domestic league appearances and goals as of 2 April 2011 ‡ National team caps and goals as of 1 December 2010

Adékambi Olufadé (born 7 January 1980) is a Togolese former professional footballer who played as a forward.

He played in several countries, including Guinea, Belgium, France, Qatar, and the United Arab Emirates, gaining experience in a variety of leagues. He was particularly notable for his performances in the Belgian Pro League and also made appearances in Ligue 1. He played a key role for his teams with his attacking ability and game management.

Olufadé was a prominent member of the Togo national team and represented the country at the 2006 FIFA World Cup, helping Togo reach its first-ever FIFA World Cup finals.

His first name is sometimes written Adekanmi or Adekamni, but it should normally be Adékambi.

== Club career ==
Olufade began his professional career in 1998 with Dynamic Togolais in Togo. After playing for Guinea's Satellite FC in 2000, he moved to Belgium's KSC Lokeren, making his debut in European football. After making 13 appearances and scoring 7 goals for Lokeren, he moved to France's Lille in 2001.

At Lille, he made 11 Ligue 1 appearances and scored 1 goal during the 2001–02 season. He also made 5 appearances in the UEFA Champions League, scoring 1 goal. He was then loaned to Nice for the 2002–03 season, where he scored 2 goals in 18 league appearances. In 2003, he was loaned to Sporting Charleroi, scoring 7 goals in 24 appearances.

He returned to Lille in 2004 but did not make any league appearances. He subsequently played for Qatar's Al-Sailiya and the United Arab Emirates' Emirates Club.

In 2006, he joined Belgian club Gent. He enjoyed the most successful period of his career at Gent, scoring 15 goals in 27 league appearances during the 2006–07 season. He continued to perform well in subsequent seasons, scoring 9 goals in the 2007–08 season and another 9 goals in the 2008–09 season. In four seasons with Gent, he made 70 league appearances and scored 33 goals.

In 2010, he left Gent and returned to Sporting Charleroi. He made 5 league appearances during the 2010–11 season before retiring from professional football in 2011.

== International career ==
Olufade was first called up to the Togo national team in 1997 and began regularly appearing in international matches from 2000. He participated in the 2002 Africa Cup of Nations and the 2006 Africa Cup of Nations, and scored his first international goal against Senegal during the African qualifiers for the 2006 FIFA World Cup.

Olufade was one of the players who helped Togo qualify for the FIFA World Cup for the first time in its history, and he participated in the 2006 FIFA World Cup. Togo were drawn in a group with South Korea, Switzerland, and France. Olufade did not play against South Korea or Switzerland, but on 23 June, he made his World Cup debut in the final group-stage match against France, coming on as a substitute for Chérif Touré Mamam in the 59th minute. The match ended in a 2–0 defeat for Togo.

=== International goals ===
Scores and results list Togo's goal tally first.

No	Date	Venue	Opponent	Score	Result	Competition
1.	18 June 2005	Stade Léopold Sédar Senghor, Dakar, Senegal	Senegal	1–0	2–2	2006 FIFA World Cup qualification
2.	11 January 2006	Stade Mustapha Ben Jannet, Monastir, Tunisia	Ghana	1–0	1–0	Friendly
3.	7 February 2007	Stade de Kégué, Lomé, Togo	Cameroon	1–0	2–2	Friendly
4.	24 March 2007	Stade de Kégué, Lomé, Togo	Sierra Leone	2–0	3–1	2008 Africa Cup of Nations qualification
5.	17 June 2007	Stade de l'Amitié, Cotonou, Benin	Benin	1–4	1–4	2008 Africa Cup of Nations qualification
6.	22 August 2007	Stade de Kégué, Lomé, Togo	Zambia	1–3	1–3	Friendly
7.	31 May 2008	Ohene Djan Stadium, Accra, Ghana	Zambia	1–0	1–0	2010 FIFA World Cup qualification
8.	8 June 2008	Somhlolo National Stadium, Lobamba, Swaziland	Swaziland	1–2	1–2	2010 FIFA World Cup qualification
9.	11 October 2008	Ohene Djan Stadium, Accra, Ghana	Swaziland	3–0	6–0	2010 FIFA World Cup qualification
