= 1994–95 Belgian Cup =

Tournament details
- Country: Belgium

Final positions
- Champions: Club Brugge
- Runners-up: Germinal Ekeren

Tournament statistics
- Top goal scorer: Edwin van Ankeren (7)

The 1994–95 Belgian Cup was the 40th season of the main knockout competition in Belgian association football, the Belgian Cup.

== Bracket ==
This chart shows the 16 remaining clubs and the matches from the Round of 16 onwards. Only the semi-finals were played over two legs. The final was played as a single match at a neutral venue.

Round of 16
1	Eendracht Aalst	8
16	FC Rita Berlaar (III)	1
8	Antwerp FC	7
9	SK Deinze (II)	4
5	RFC Seraing	1 (6)
12	KV Oostende	1 (5)
4	Club Brugge	4
13	KAA Gent	0
6	KSC Lokeren (II)	0
11	KSK Beveren	7
3	Germinal Ekeren	2
14	Lierse SK	0
7	Cercle Brugge	2
10	RSC Anderlecht	4
2	KV Mechelen	1
15	Excelsior Moeskroen (II)	0

Quarter-finals
Eendracht Aalst	4
Antwerp FC	1
RFC Seraing	1
Club Brugge	2
KSK Beveren	0
Germinal Ekeren	2
RSC Anderlecht	2
KV Mechelen	0

Semifinals
Eendracht Aalst	0 0
Club Brugge	0 3
Germinal Ekeren	0 4
RSC Anderlecht	2 0

Final
Club Brugge	3
Germinal Ekeren	1

=== Final ===
28 May 1995
16:00

Club Brugge	3–1	Germinal Ekeren
Claessens 26'; Vermant 41'; De Brul 84'		M'Ghoghi 68'

Constant Vanden Stock Stadium, Anderlecht
Attendance: 18,500
Referee: Guy Goethals
