= Dirk Medved =

Belgian footballer

Personal information
- Date of birth: 15 September 1968 (age 58)
- Place of birth: Genk, Belgium
- Height: 1.84 m (6 ft 0 in)
- Position: Defender

Youth career
- Zwartberg

Senior career*
Years	Team	Apps	(Gls)
1985–1988	Waterschei	51	(2)
1988–1989	Genk	0	(0)
1989–1993	Gent	127	(6)
1993–1997	Club Brugge	123	(2)
1997–1999	Standard Liège	15	(0)
Total		316	(10)

International career
1991–1997	Belgium	26	(0)
- * Club domestic league appearances and goals

Dirk Medved (born 15 September 1968) is a Belgian retired footballer who played as a defender (right or central).

== Football career ==
During his professional career, Genk-born Medved played for K. Waterschei S.V. Thor Genk, K.R.C. Genk, K.A.A. Gent, Club Brugge K.V. – where he was instrumental in the conquest of five domestic trophies, namely the double in 1995–96 – and Standard Liège, totalling 316 games in 14 seasons (ten goals).

He gained 26 caps for Belgium, being chosen for the squad at the 1994 FIFA World Cup, where he played two matches out of four (the national side exited in the round-of-16).

== Honours ==
Club Brugge

- Belgian First Division: 1995–96
- Belgian Cup: 1994–95, 1995–96; runner-up 1993–94
- Belgian Super Cup: 1994, 1996; runner-up 1995

Standard Liège

- Belgian Cup: runner-up 1998–99
