= Belpaire =

Belpaire is a surname, notably in Belgium. Notable people with this surname include:

- Alfred Belpaire (1820–1893), Belgian locomotive engineer
- Jurgen Belpaire (born 1973), Belgian footballer
- Marie-Elisabeth Belpaire (1853–1948), Belgian writer and activist

== See also ==
- Belpaire firebox, invented by Alfred Belpaire
