= 1998 Belgian Super Cup =

1998 Belgian Supercup
Club Brugge	Genk
2	1
- Date: 8 August 1998
- Venue: Jan Breydel Stadium, Bruges
- Referee: Eric Blareau
- Attendance: 1,700

The 1998 Belgian Supercup was a football match between the winners of the previous season's 1997–98 Belgian First Division and 1997–98 Belgian Cup competitions: cup winners Genk and league champions Club Brugge.

The match took place on 8 August 1998 at the ground of the league winners Club Brugge, the Jan Breydel Stadium. Club Brugge won the match, holding on to their lead despite a late consolation goal by Souleymane Oularé.

== Details ==
8 August 1998

Club Brugge	2–1	Genk
De Brul 19'; Schockaert 71'	Report	Oularé 78'

Jan Breydel Stadium, Bruges
Attendance: 1,700
Referee: Eric Blareau

Club Brugge	Genk

GK	1	(Belgium) Dany Verlinden
SW	3	(Federal Republic of Yugoslavia) Aleksandar Ilić
RB	2	(Belgium) Eric Deflandre
CB	12	(Belgium) Tjörven De Brul	Booked	(substituted off) 71'
LB	5	(Belgium) Vital Borkelmans
CM	19	(Ghana) Eric Addo
CM	6	(Belgium) Franky Van der Elst (c)		(substituted off) 46'
RM	15	(Belgium) Gunter Verjans		(substituted off) 84'
AM	10	(Federal Republic of Yugoslavia) Darko Anić		(substituted off) 63'
LM	14	(Belgium) Sven Vermant	Booked
CF	8	(Democratic Republic of the Congo) Elos Elonga-Ekakia	Booked
Substitutes:
FW	20	(The Gambia) Ebou Sillah		(substituted on) 84'
FW	22	(Belgium) Koen Schockaert		(substituted on) 63'
MF	21	(Belgium) Olivier De Cock		(substituted on) 46'
DF	16	(Democratic Republic of the Congo) Hervé Nzelo-Lembi		(substituted on) 71'
Manager:
(Belgium) Eric Gerets

GK	1	(Hungary) István Brockhauser
SW	6	(Belgium) Domenico Olivieri (c)		(substituted off) 71'
RB	7	(Belgium) Marc Hendrikx
CB	13	(Belgium) Marc Vangronsveld	Booked
CB	3	(Belgium) Daniel Kimoni
LB	22	(Brazil) Rogério	Booked	(substituted off) 62'
CM	5	(Belgium) Wilfried Delbroek	(red card) 90+2'
CM	8	(Albania) Besnik Hasi		(substituted off) 46'
AM	10	(Iceland) Þórður Guðjónsson
CF	18	(Hungary) Ferenc Horváth		(substituted off) 58'
CF	9	(Guinea) Souleymane Oularé
Substitutes:
FW	15	(Senegal) Salif Keita		(substituted on) 71'
MF	14	(Democratic Republic of the Congo) Ngoy Nsumbu		(substituted on) 46'
DF	12	(Iceland) Arnar Viðarsson (Note: Defender Viðarsson was only on trial at Genk at the time of the match but allowed to participate according to the rules of the Belgian Super Cup at that time. Eventually he would not sign for Genk but stay with Lokeren where he was contracted at the time of the match.)		(substituted on) 62'
FW	20	(Brazil) Edmílson		(substituted on) 58'
Manager:
(Belgium) Aimé Anthuenis

== See also ==
- 1998–99 Belgian First Division
- 1998–99 Belgian Cup
