= Frédéric Peiremans =

Belgian footballer

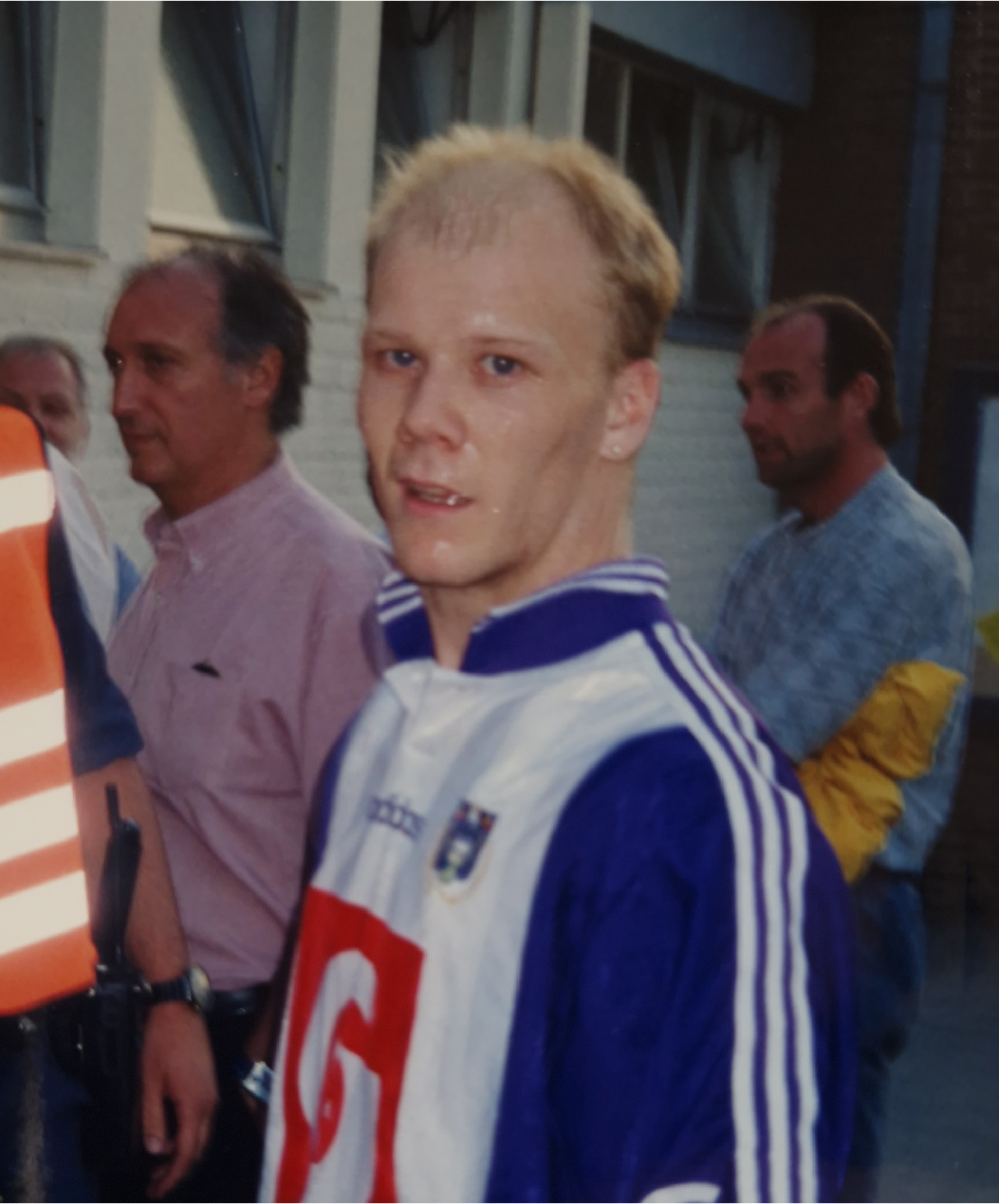
- Peiremans with Anderlecht in 1997

Personal information
- Date of birth: 3 September 1973 (age 53)
- Place of birth: Nivelles, Belgium
- Position: Midfielder

Youth career
- CS La Forestoise
- Anderlecht

Senior career*
Years	Team	Apps	(Gls)
1993–1998	Anderlecht	69	(4)
1998–1999	Charleroi	24	(1)
1999–2000	FC Twente	23	(5)
2000–2001	Real Sociedad	0	(0)
2001–2002	SD Eibar	0	(0)

International career
1996	Belgium	3	(0)
- * Club domestic league appearances and goals

Frédéric Peiremans (born 3 September 1973) is a Belgian former footballer who played for Anderlecht, Charleroi, FC Twente, Real Sociedad and SD Eibar, as well as the Belgium national team.

== Honours ==
Anderlecht

- Belgian First Division: 1993–94, 1994–95
- Belgian Cup: 1993–94
- Belgian Super Cup: 1993, 1995
