= 2002 FIFA World Cup qualification – UEFA Group 6 =

Football tournament qualification stage

The five teams in this group played against each other on a home-and-away basis. The group winner Croatia qualified for the 17th FIFA World Cup held in South Korea and Japan. The runner-up Belgium advanced to the UEFA Play-off and played against the Czech Republic. The group had seen a very close three-way battle between Croatia, Scotland and Belgium, with several draws between the top three sides: ultimately it was only decided towards the end when Belgium's defeat of Scotland put paid to all but the mathematical goal-difference chances of the Scots, and left Belgium in first place in the group, only to be defeated by Croatia in the final match, with Croatia thus overtaking them for first place in the group and finishing unbeaten.

== Standings ==
Pos	Team	Pld	W	D	L	GF	GA	GD	Pts	Qualification	Croatia national football team	Belgium national football team	Scotland national football team	Latvia national football team	San Marino national football team
1	Croatia	8	5	3	0	15	2	+13	18	Qualification to 2002 FIFA World Cup	—	1–0	1–1	4–1	4–0
2	Belgium	8	5	2	1	25	6	+19	17	Advance to UEFA play-offs	0–0	—	2–0	3–1	10–1
3	Scotland	8	4	3	1	12	6	+6	15		0–0	2–2	—	2–1	4–0
4	Latvia	8	1	1	6	5	16	−11	4		0–1	0–4	0–1	—	1–1
5	San Marino	8	0	1	7	3	30	−27	1		0–4	1–4	0–2	0–1	—

== Matches ==
2 September 2000
20:00 UTC+2

Belgium	0–0	Croatia
	Report

King Baudouin Stadium, Brussels
Attendance: 27,510
Referee: Nikolai Levnikov (Russia)
2 September 2000
18:00 UTC+3

Latvia	0–1	Scotland
	Report	McCann 89'

Skonto stadions, Riga
Attendance: 9,200
Referee: Andreas Schluchter (Switzerland)

7 October 2000
20:15 UTC+3

Latvia	0–4	Belgium
	Report	Wilmots 5'; B. Peeters 13'; Cavens 83'; G. Verheyen 90'

Skonto stadions, Riga
Attendance: 7,311
Referee: Leslie Irvine (Northern Ireland)
7 October 2000
19:45 UTC+2

San Marino	0–2	Scotland
	Report	Elliott 71'; Hutchison 73'

Stadio Olimpico, Serravalle
Attendance: 4,377
Referee: Gylfi Thor Orrason (Iceland)

11 October 2000
20:00 UTC+2

Croatia	1–1	Scotland
Bokšić 16'	Report	K. Gallacher 24'

Stadion Maksimir, Zagreb
Attendance: 17,995
Referee: Gilles Veissiere (France)

15 November 2000
20:30 UTC+1

San Marino	0–1	Latvia
	Report	Jeļisejevs 9'

Stadio Olimpico, Serravalle
Attendance: 517
Referee: Darko Čeferin (Slovenia)

28 February 2001
21:00 UTC+1

Belgium	10–1	San Marino
Vanderhaeghe 10', 50'; É. Mpenza 13'; Goor 26', 60'; Baseggio 64'; Wilmots 72'; B. Peeters 76', 84', 88'	Report	Selva 90'

King Baudouin Stadium, Brussels
Attendance: 40,104
Referee: Sten Kaldma (Estonia)

24 March 2001
18:00 UTC+1

Croatia	4–1	Latvia
Balaban 8', 42', 45'; Vugrinec 89'	Report	Štolcers 60'

Stadion Gradski vrt, Osijek
Attendance: 13,345
Referee: Martin Ingvarsson (Sweden)
24 March 2001
15:00 UTC±0

Scotland	2–2	Belgium
Dodds 2', 27' (pen.)	Report	Wilmots 58'; Van Buyten 90'

Hampden Park, Glasgow
Attendance: 37,480
Referee: Kim Milton Nielsen (Denmark)

28 March 2001
20:00 UTC+1

Scotland	4–0	San Marino
Hendry 22', 33'; Dodds 34'; Cameron 63'	Report

Hampden Park, Glasgow
Attendance: 27,313
Referee: Petteri Kari (Finland)

25 April 2001
18:30 UTC+3

Latvia	1–1	San Marino
Pahars 1'	Report	Albani 59'

Skonto stadions, Riga
Attendance: 4,000
Referee: Karen Nalbandyan (Armenia)

2 June 2001
20:15 UTC+2

Croatia	4–0	San Marino
Vlaović 3'; Balaban 29'; Šuker 54' (pen.); Vugrinec 89'	Report

Stadion Varteks, Varaždin
Attendance: 15,000
Referee: Oleg Timofeyev (Estonia)
2 June 2001
20:00 UTC+2

Belgium	3–1	Latvia
Wilmots 2'; É. Mpenza 12'; Zemļinskis 50' (o.g.)	Report	Pahars 52'

King Baudouin Stadium, Brussels
Attendance: 32,000
Referee: Ivan Dobrinov (Bulgaria)

6 June 2001
18:00 UTC+3

Latvia	0–1	Croatia
	Report	Balaban 40'

Skonto stadions, Riga
Attendance: 5,000
Referee: John McDermott (Republic of Ireland)
6 June 2001
20:30 UTC+2

San Marino	1–4	Belgium
Selva 11'	Report	Wilmots 10', 89' (pen.); G.Verheyen 60'; Sonck 68'

Stadio Olimpico, Serravalle
Attendance: 1,538
Referee: Haim Yakov (Israel)

1 September 2001
15:00 UTC+1

Scotland	0–0	Croatia
	Report

Hampden Park, Glasgow
Attendance: 47,584
Referee: Ľuboš Micheľ (Slovakia)

5 September 2001
20:15 UTC+2

San Marino	0–4	Croatia
	Report	N. Kovač 40'; Prosinečki 48' (pen.), 90'; Soldo 77'

Stadio Olimpico, Serravalle
Attendance: 1,387
Referee: Knud Stadsgaard (Denmark)
5 September 2001
20:15 UTC+2

Belgium	2–0	Scotland
N. Van Kerckhoven 28'; Goor 90'	Report

King Baudouin Stadium, Brussels
Attendance: 43,500
Referee: Manuel Mejuto González (Spain)

6 October 2001
18:00 UTC+2

Croatia	1–0	Belgium
Bokšić 75'	Report

Stadion Maksimir, Zagreb
Attendance: 36,077
Referee: Hellmut Krug (Germany)
6 October 2001
17:00 UTC+1

Scotland	2–1	Latvia
Freedman 44'; D. Weir 53'	Report	Rubins 21'

Hampden Park, Glasgow
Attendance: 23,228
Referee: Terje Hauge (Norway)

== Goalscorers ==
There were 60 goals scored in 20 matches, for an average of 3 goals per match.

6 goals

- (Belgium) Marc Wilmots

5 goals

- (Croatia) Boško Balaban

4 goals

- (Belgium) Bob Peeters

3 goals

- (Belgium) Bart Goor
- (Scotland) Billy Dodds

2 goals

- (Belgium) Émile Mpenza
- (Belgium) Yves Vanderhaeghe
- (Belgium) Gert Verheyen
- (Croatia) Alen Bokšić
- (Croatia) Robert Prosinečki
- (Croatia) Davor Vugrinec
- (Latvia) Marians Pahars
- (San Marino) Andy Selva
- (Scotland) Colin Hendry

1 goal

- (Belgium) Walter Baseggio
- (Belgium) Jurgen Cavens
- (Belgium) Wesley Sonck
- (Belgium) Daniel Van Buyten
- (Belgium) Nico Van Kerckhoven
- (Croatia) Niko Kovač
- (Croatia) Zvonimir Soldo
- (Croatia) Davor Šuker
- (Croatia) Goran Vlaović
- (Latvia) Aleksandrs Jeļisejevs
- (Latvia) Andrejs Rubins
- (Latvia) Andrejs Štolcers
- (San Marino) Nicola Albani
- (Scotland) Colin Cameron
- (Scotland) Matt Elliott
- (Scotland) Dougie Freedman
- (Scotland) Kevin Gallacher
- (Scotland) Don Hutchison
- (Scotland) Neil McCann
- (Scotland) David Weir

1 own goal

- (Latvia) Mihails Zemļinskis (against Belgium)
