= Tjörven De Brul =

Belgian footballer

Personal information
- Date of birth: 22 June 1973 (age 53)
- Place of birth: Aalst, Belgium
- Position: Defender

Team information
- Current team: Berlare (Head coach)

Senior career*
| Years | Team | Apps | (Gls) |
| 1991–1994 | Lokeren | 45 | (8) |
| 1994–2003 | Club Brugge | 195 | (21) |
| 2003–2005 | Gent | 31 | (6) |
| 2005–2007 | Zulte Waregem | 46 | (2) |
| 2007–2009 | Ronse | 57 | (17) |
| 2009–2012 | Berlare | 60 | (2) |
| Total | | 434 | (56) |

International career
- Belgium U-21
| 1998–1999 | Belgium | 11 | (0) |

Managerial career
- 2011–2012: KRC Gent
- 2013–2014: KVC Jong Lede
- 2020–: Berlare
- * Club domestic league appearances and goals

Tjörven De Brul (born 22 June 1973) is a retired Belgian football defender and current head coach of SK Berlare.

== Career ==
=== Coaching career ===
After retiring in the summer 2011, De Brul was hired as head coach of Belgian fourth division club K.R.C. Gent in October 2011. He was fired on 27 December 2012 due to poor results. In April 2013, he was appointed head coach of KVC Jong Lede. He left the club at the end of the 2013-14 season.

At the end of December 2019, he was appointed head coach of his former club, SK Berlare.

current career

LO Teacher at the school DvmHtbAalst

== Honours ==
Club Brugge

- Belgian Cup: 1994–95, 1995–96
- Belgian First Division: 1995–96, 1997–98, 2002–03
- Belgian Super Cup: 1998

Zulte Waregem

- Belgian Cup: 2005–06
