= Jean-Marie Abeels =

Belgian footballer

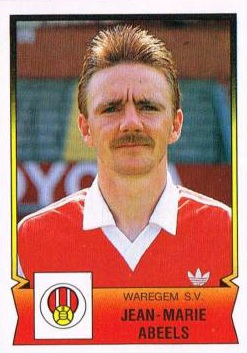

Personal information
- Date of birth: 18 November 1962 (age 63)
- Position: Forward

Senior career*
Years	Team	Apps	(Gls)
1981–1983	Stade Waremmien		
1983–1986	Tongeren		
1986–1989	Kortrijk		
1989–1990	Germinal Ekeren		
1990–1993	Waregem		
1993–1995	Germinal Ekeren		
1995–1996	Sint-Truiden		
1996–1998	Verviers		
1998–1999	Herentals		
1999–2000	Vorselaar		
2000–2002	Verviers		
2002	Sprimont Comblain		
2003	Montegnée		
2004	Vorselaar		
- * Club domestic league appearances and goals

Jean-Marie Abeels (born 18 November 1962) is a Belgian former football player and manager who played as a forward.

He amassed over 200 games in the Belgian Pro League for Kortrijk, Germinal Ekeren, Waregem and Sint-Truiden.

In the later stages of his career he was allegedly involved in illegal birdcatching and trading.

Abeels married a Kenyan woman. Together they started a football academy in Kenya named JMJ Sport Academy, bringing such players to Europe such as Victor Wanyama and Ayub Timbe.
