= Koen Schockaert =

Belgian footballer

Personal information
- Date of birth: 13 February 1978 (age 48)
- Height: 1.81 m (5 ft 11 1/2 in)
- Position: Forward

Senior career*
Years	Team	Apps	(Gls)
1996–1998	Lokeren		
1998–2003	Club Brugge		
2001	→ Tromsø (loan)		
2002	→ Sint-Truiden (loan)		
2003–2004	Germinal Beerschot		
2004	Verbroedering Dender		
2004–2006	Standaard Wetteren		
2006–2007	Sint-Niklaas		
2007–2008	Standaard Wetteren		
2008–2009	Cappellen		
- * Club domestic league appearances and goals

Koen Schockaert (born 13 February 1978) is a retired Belgian football striker.
