= Walter Baseggio =

Belgian footballer (born 1978)

Personal information
- Full name: Walter Baseggio
- Date of birth: 19 August 1978 (age 48)
- Place of birth: Clabecq, Belgium
- Height: 1.84 m (6 ft 0 in)
- Position: Midfielder

Youth career
- 1985–1991: SC Clabecq
- 1991–1996: Anderlecht

Senior career*
Years	Team	Apps	(Gls)
1996–2005	Anderlecht	244	(42)
2006	Treviso	28	(1)
2007	Anderlecht	10	(0)
2008–2010	Mouscron	41	(6)
2010–2011	Tubize	15	(1)
Total		338	(50)

International career
1999–2005	Belgium	27	(1)
- * Club domestic league appearances and goals

Walter Baseggio (pronounced [ˈvalter baˈzeddʒo]; born 19 August 1978) is a retired Belgian professional footballer who played as a central midfielder.

He spent most of his 15-year professional career with Anderlecht, amassing Belgian Pro League totals of 285 games and 48 goals and also representing in the competition Mouscron. He won major nine titles with his main club, including five national championships.

== Club career ==
Born in Clabecq, Wallonia, Baseggio made an impressive debut for R.S.C. Anderlecht aged 17, against old rivals Standard Liège, and scored his first goal in the same game. At the time a hot prospect for the future, he was in direct competition with Enzo Scifo and Pär Zetterberg, two players whose talent was already confirmed; eventually he became a first-team regular, and then the maestro of the team after the departures of the pair in the late 1990s.

With the return of Zetterberg in the summer of 2003, Anderlecht coach Hugo Broos decided that there was no room for both players, and Baseggio found himself with few game opportunities, until the manager was fired in February 2005. After a disappointing end of season, he also played second-choice for new coach Franky Vercauteren; the owner of an extremely powerful shot, he scored the 1–1 equalizer in an eventual 2–1 win against R.A.A. Louviéroise in mid-November 2004, hitting the ball with such power that it burst.

In the 2005 summer Baseggio was transfer listed, joining Italy's Treviso F.B.C. 1993 in January 2006 and being relegated from Serie A in his first year. However, in the mid-season interval of the next season, he returned to Anderlecht: in his two stints with the Brussels club, he won four leagues, although he was only a fringe player in the last conquest.

After only three matches in the first part of the 2007–08 campaign, Baseggio moved again in January, joining R.E. Mouscron for an undisclosed fee, with a contract due to expire in June 2010. On 20 May of that year, the 31-year-old signed a three-year deal with A.F.C. Tubize in the second division, being a free agent since late in the previous year after the former side had folded due to serious financial problems. He played the remainder of his career in amateur football, representing Patro Lensois and ETSP Brainoise.

== International career ==
Baseggio made his Belgium debut on 27 March 1999 (aged 20) in a 1–0 friendly loss in Bulgaria, going on to collect a further 26 caps. He did not take part, however, in any major international tournament, being injured for both the UEFA Euro 2000 and 2002 FIFA World Cup competitions.

== Illness ==
Baseggio was diagnosed with thyroid cancer in June 2009. After being given the all-clear by doctors in 2010, he announced in May 2012 the cancer had returned.

== Career statistics ==
=== International ===
Appearances and goals by national team and year
National team	Year	Apps	Goals
Belgium	1999	3	0
Belgium	2000	1	0
Belgium	2001	4	1
Belgium	2002	6	0
Belgium	2003	7	0
Belgium	2004	5	0
Belgium	2005	1	0
Total		27	1

Scores and results list Belgium's goal tally first, score column indicates score after each Baseggio goal.

List of international goals scored by Walter Bassegio
No.	Date	Venue	Opponent	Score	Result	Competition
1	28 February 2001	King Baudouin Stadium, Brussels, Belgium	San Marino	6–1	10–1	2002 FIFA World Cup qualification

== Honours ==
Anderlecht

- Belgian First Division: 1999–00, 2003–04, 2006–07
- Belgian Cup: runner-up 1996–97
- Belgian Supercup: 2000, 2001, 2007
- Belgian League Cup: 2000
- Belgian Sports Team of the Year: 2000

Individual

- Belgian Young Professional Footballer of the Year: 1998–99, 1999–2000
- Belgian Professional Footballer of the Year: 2000–01
