= Nicola Albani =

Sammarinese footballer (born 1981)

Personal information
- Full name: Nicola Albani
- Date of birth: April 15, 1981 (age 45)
- Place of birth: San Marino
- Position: Defender

Senior career*
Years	Team	Apps	(Gls)
2000–2003	S.S. Murata	7+	(1+)
2002–2003	A.C. Tropical Coriano		
2003–2005	S.S. Murata		
2005–2006	A.C. Juvenes/Dogana		
2006–2007	Saludecio Calcio		
2007–2009	Olympia Secchiano		
2009–2014	S.S. Murata	32	(0)
2014–2018	S.S. Pennarossa	56	(0)
2018–2020	S.S. Murata	29	(0)

International career
2001–2011	San Marino	40	(1)
- * Club domestic league appearances and goals

Nicola Albani (born 15 April 1981) is a retired San Marinese footballer who last played for S.S. Murata and formerly the San Marino national football team. He scored in the 1–1 draw with Latvia. He is maybe best known for being elbowed by Colin Hendry in an incident which would see the Scotland defender retire from international football.

== International goals ==
Scores and results list. San Marino's goal tally first.

#	Date	Venue	Opponent	Score	Result	Competition
1.	25 April 2001	Skonto Stadions, Riga, Latvia	Latvia	1–1	1–1	2002 FIFA World Cup Qualifying
