= Daniel Kimoni =

Belgian footballer

Personal information
- Full name: Daniel Mark Kimoni
- Date of birth: 22 August 1971 (age 55)
- Place of birth: Belgium
- Height: 1.78 m (5 ft 10 in)
- Position: Defender

Senior career*
| Years | Team | Apps | (Gls) |
| -1993 | R.F.C. Tilleur | | |
| 1993-1996 | Standard Liège | 34 | (0) |
| 1996-2000 | K.R.C. Genk | 124 | (2) |
| 2000-2001 | Standard Liège | | |
| 2001-2002 | Grazer AK | 3 | (0) |
| 2002/2003 | FC Augsburg | 3 | (0) |
| 2002/03-2004 | C.S. Visé | | |
| 2005-2006 | R.R.F.C. Montegnée | | |

International career
| 1999 | Belgium | 3 | (0) |
- * Club domestic league appearances and goals

Daniel Kimoni (born 22 August 1971 in Belgium) is a Belgian retired footballer.

== Honours ==
Genk

- Belgian First Division: 1998–99
- Belgian Cup: 1999–2000
