= Mike Verstraeten =

Belgian footballer and politician

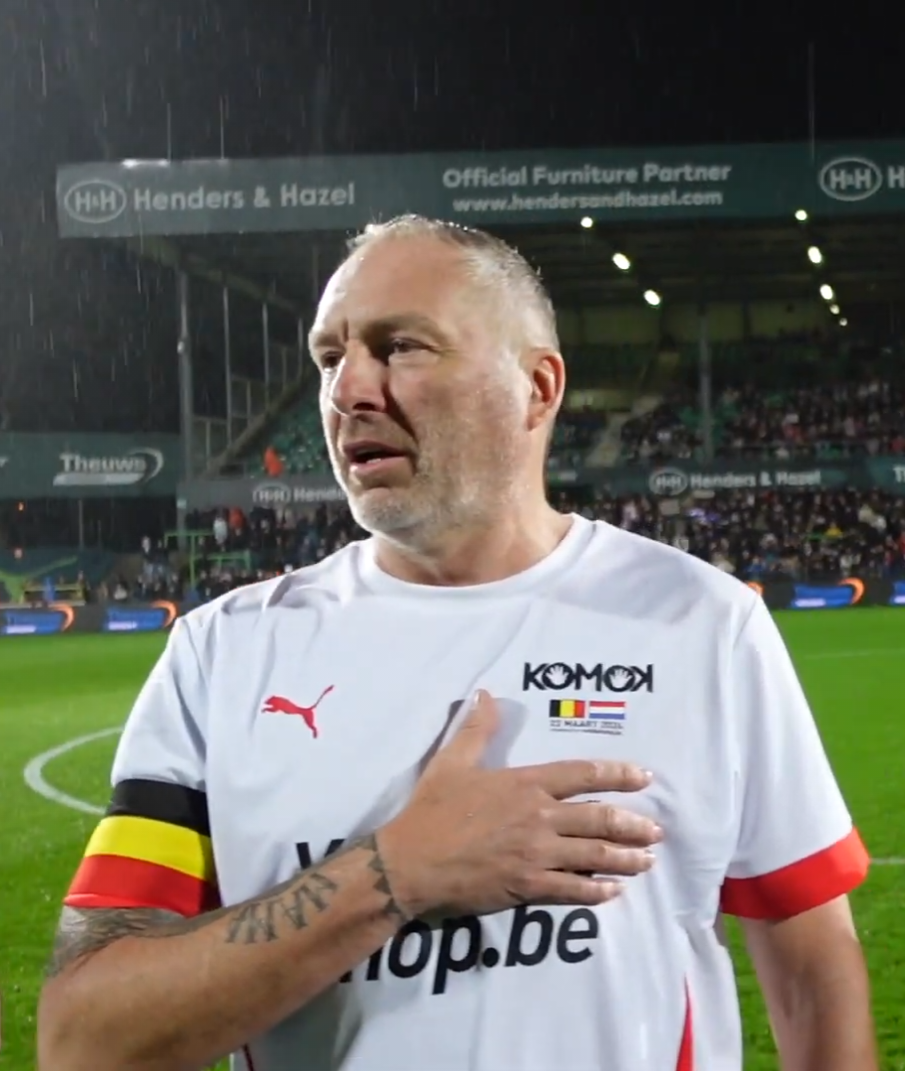
- Verstraeten at a charity football match in Lommel, Belgium in 2024

Personal information
- Full name: Michaël Johan Stefan Verstraeten
- Date of birth: 12 August 1967 (age 59)
- Place of birth: Mechelen, Belgium
- Height: 1.92 m (6 ft 3 1/2 in)
- Position: Defender

Senior career*
Years	Team	Apps	(Gls)
1984–1989	K.V. Mechelen	4	(0)
1989–1990	K. Beerschot V.A.C.	30	(1)
1990–1999	Germinal Ekeren	243	(21)
1999–2001	R.S.C. Anderlecht	8	(0)

International career
1997–1998	Belgium	6	(0)
- * Club domestic league appearances and goals

Michaël Johan Stefan "Mike" Verstraeten (Dutch: [ˈmɑik fərˈstraːtə(n)]; (Note: In isolation, Verstraeten is pronounced [vərˈstraːtə(n)].) born 12 August 1967) is a Belgian politician and a former football player. His former clubs include Germinal Ekeren and R.S.C. Anderlecht. Capped for the Belgium national team, Verstraeten played one game at the 1998 FIFA World Cup.

== Honours ==
Germinal Ekeren

- Belgian Cup: 1996–97
