= Pascal Renier =

Belgian footballer

Personal information
- Date of birth: 3 August 1971 (age 55)
- Place of birth: Waremme, Belgium
- Height: 1.83 m (6 ft 0 in)
- Positions: Centre-back; left-back

Youth career
- 1979–1983: Berloz BW FC
- 1983–1989: R.F.C. Seraing
- 1989–1990: R.F.C. de Liège

Senior career*
Years	Team	Apps	(Gls)
1990–1992	RFC Liège	31	(0)
1992–1998	Club Brugge	110	(2)
1998–1999	Standard Liège	20	(1)
1999–2002	Troyes	20	(0)
2002–2003	Mouscron	7	(0)
2003–2004	Westerlo	19	(0)
2004–2005	Zulte Waregem		

International career
1994–1996	Belgium	13	(0)
- * Club domestic league appearances and goals

Pascal Renier (born 3 August 1971) is a former Belgian football defender. His former clubs include Club Brugge and R.E. Mouscron. He also played for Troyes AC in French Division 1.

Renier was in the Belgium squad for the 1994 World Cup, albeit without playing.

== Career statistics ==
=== International ===
Appearances and goals by national team and year
National team	Year	Apps	Goals
Belgium	1994	1	0
Belgium	1995	6	0
Belgium	1996	6	0
Total		13	0
