= Gert Verheyen =

Belgian football manager and former player

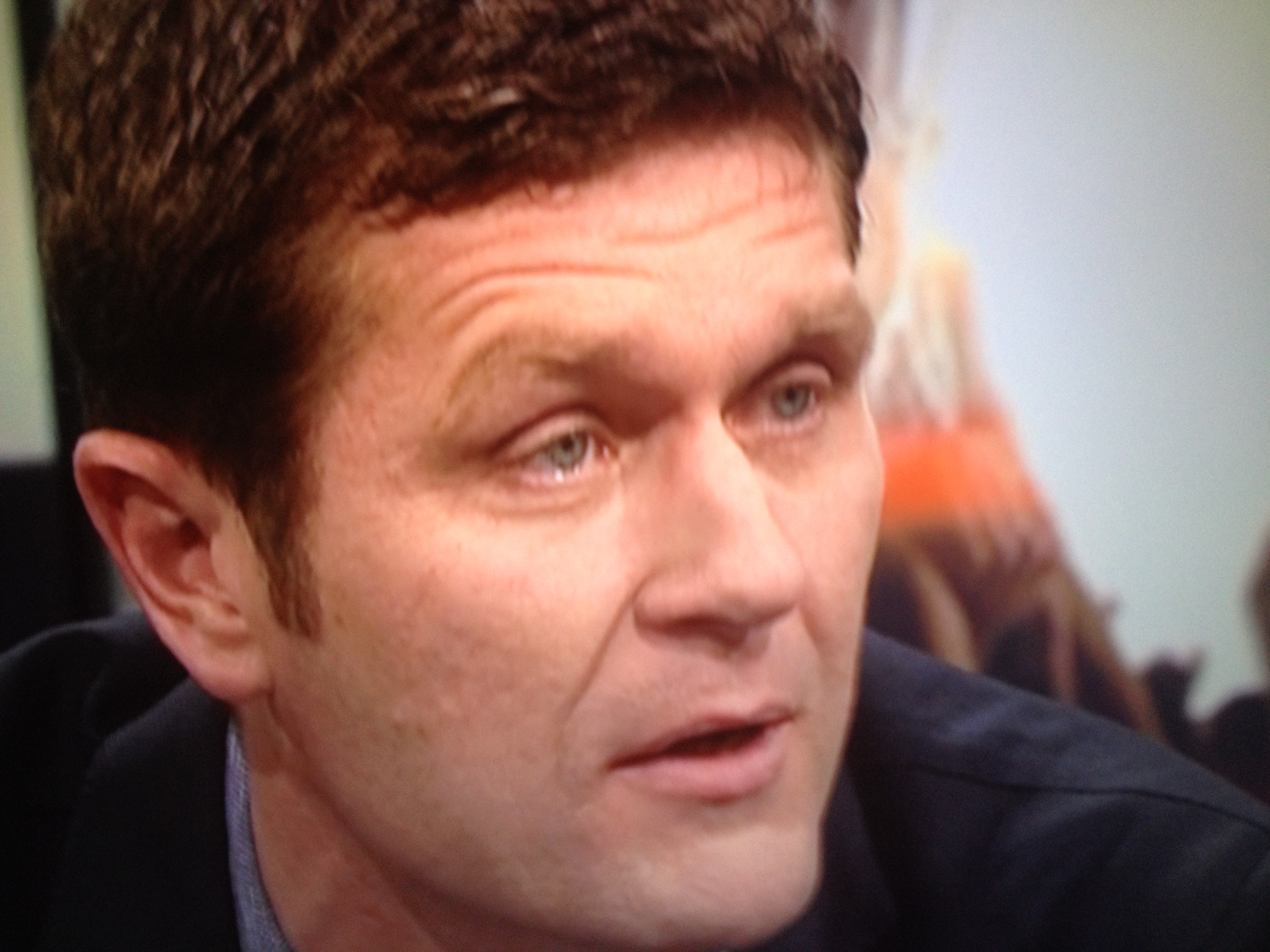
- Verheyen in 2017

Personal information
- Date of birth: 20 September 1970 (age 56)
- Place of birth: Hoogstraten, Belgium
- Height: 1.88 m (6 ft 2 in)
- Position: Forward

Youth career
- 1978–1986: Hoogstraten VV

Senior career*
Years	Team	Apps	(Gls)
1986–1988	Lierse	39	(10)
1988–1992	Anderlecht	64	(3)
1992–2006	Club Brugge	480	(157)
Total		583	(170)

International career
1994–2002	Belgium	50	(10)

Managerial career
- 2006–2007: Club Brugge (youth)
- 2013–2018: Belgium U19
- 2018–2019: Oostende
- * Club domestic league appearances and goals

Gert Verheyen (Dutch pronunciation: [ˈɣɛrt fərˈɦɛiə(n)]; (Note: In isolation, Verheyen is pronounced [vərˈɦɛiə(n)]}.) also spelled Verheijen; born 20 September 1970) is a Belgian former footballer and manager, who was last in charge of Oostende.

In a 20-year professional career, he was mainly associated with Anderlecht and Club Brugge (especially the latter), scoring over 200 official goals for both clubs combined; he was known to have rather few technical skills, relying on a hard-working approach.

Verheyen represented Belgium in two World Cups and one European Championship. His father Jan was also a player and international for Belgium from 1965 till 1976.

== Club career ==
Born in Hoogstraten, Antwerp, Verheyen started playing professionally with Lierse, scoring ten Belgian Second Division goals in his two season-spell, as he was not yet aged 18. In the 1988 summer he moved to Anderlecht, where he did not have a good scoring record, also appearing rarely in his first two years.

In 1992, Verheyen signed with Club Brugge, where he would remain for the next 14 years, rarely missing a game and netting in double digits in ten of those campaigns, with the side collecting four leagues and two cups. In October 2000 he was expected to move to England with Ipswich Town, but the deal eventually fell through.

After more than 500 overall appearances for Brugge (with 195 goals), Verheyen retired on 5 May 2006, becoming a reserve team trainer at the club in 2006–07 and quitting football subsequently at the season's end.

== International career ==
Verheyen earned exactly 50 caps for the Belgium national team during eight years, scoring ten times. He was selected for the 1998 and 2002 FIFA World Cups as well as UEFA Euro 2000, the latter played on home soil.

Verheyen's was controversially sent off at the 1998 World Cup in France, as the Red Devils led 2–0 against Mexico. The foul resulted in a penalty, and the match ended a 2–2 draw; despite the incident, he continued to be a regular in the next few years.

== International goals ==
No.	Date	Venue	Opponent	Score	Result	Competition
1.	16 November 1994	Brussels, Belgium	Macedonia	1–0	1–1	UEFA Euro 1996 qualifying
2.	9 October 1996	Serravalle, San Marino	San Marino	1–0	3–0	1998 FIFA World Cup qualification
3.	29 March 2000	Brussels, Belgium	Netherlands	1–0	2–2	Friendly
4.	26 April 2000	Oslo, Norway	Norway	1–0	2–0	Friendly
5.	26 April 2000	Oslo, Norway	Norway	2–0	2–0	Friendly
6.	16 August 2000	Sofia, Bulgaria	Bulgaria	1–0	3–1	Friendly
7.	16 August 2000	Sofia, Bulgaria	Bulgaria	3–0	3–1	Friendly
8.	7 October 2000	Brussels, Belgium	Latvia	4–0	4–0	2002 FIFA World Cup qualification
9.	6 June 2001	Serravalle, San Marino	San Marino	2–1	4–1	2002 FIFA World Cup qualification
10.	10 November 2001	Brussels, Belgium	Czech Republic	1–0	1–0	2002 FIFA World Cup qualification

== Honours ==
=== Player ===
Anderlecht

- Belgian First Division: 1990–91
- Belgian Cup: 1988–89
- European Cup Winners' Cup: runners-up 1989–90
- Bruges Matins: 1988

Club Brugge

- Belgian First Division: 1995–96, 1997–98, 2002–03, 2004–05
- Belgian Cup: 1994–95, 1995–96, 2001–02, 2003–04; runners-up: 1997–98, 2004–05
- Belgian Supercup: 1992, 1994, 1996, 1998, 2002, 2003, 2004, 2005
- Bruges Matins: 1992, 1993, 1995, 1996, 1998, 2000, 2001, 2004, 2006
- Jules Pappaert Cup: 1995, 2005

Belgium

- FIFA Fair Play Trophy: 2002 World Cup
