= Gert Claessens =

Belgian footballer (born 1972)

Personal information
- Date of birth: 21 February 1972 (age 54)
- Place of birth: Tongeren, Belgium
- Height: 1.89 m (6 ft 2 in)
- Position: Midfielder

Youth career
- FC Membruggen

Senior career*
Years	Team	Apps	(Gls)
19??–1992	RFC Liège	9	(0)
1992–1994	Genk	59	(12)
1994–1999	Club Brugge	108	(39)
1999–2000	Oviedo	8	(0)
2001–2003	Vitesse	75	(15)
2004–2006	Genk	42	(3)
2007	Lierse		

International career
1997–1998	Belgium	4	(1)
- * Club domestic league appearances and goals

Gert Claessens (born 21 February 1972 in Tongeren) is a Belgian retired professional footballer who played as a midfielder.
