= Jurgen Belpaire =

Belgian footballer (born 1973)

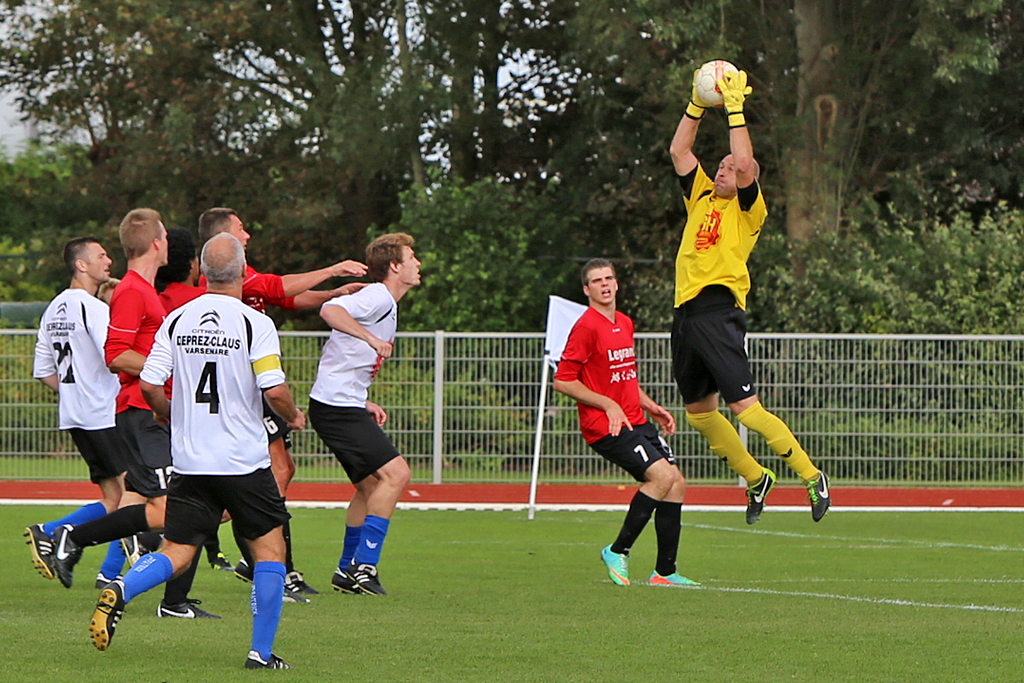
- Jurgen Belpaire in 2014

Personal information
- Date of birth: 3 January 1973 (age 53)
- Position: Goalkeeper

Senior career*
Years	Team	Apps	(Gls)
1993–1999	Club Brugge KV		
1999–2001	RBC Roosendaal		

International career
- Belgium U-21
- * Club domestic league appearances and goals

Jurgen Belpaire (born 3 January 1973) is a retired Belgian football goalkeeper.
