= KSC Lokeren =

KSC Lokeren may refer to:

- KSC Lokeren Oost-Vlaanderen, a defunct football club in Belgium.
- KSC Lokeren (2025), an active football club in Belgium, formerly called KSC Lokeren-Temse.
