= 1993–94 Belgian Cup =

Tournament details
- Country: Belgium

Final positions
- Champions: Anderlecht
- Runners-up: Club Brugge

Tournament statistics
- Matches played: 33
- Goals scored: 127 (3.85 per match)
- Top goal scorer(s): Johnny Bosman; Gunther Hofmans; Gábor Halmai; Frank Berghuis (4 goals)

The 1993–94 Belgian Cup was the 39th season of the main knockout competition in Belgian association football, the Belgian Cup.

== Final rounds ==
For the first time, the final phase started in the round of 32 when all clubs from the first division entered the competition (18 clubs plus 14 clubs from the qualifications). All rounds were played in one leg except for the semifinals. The final game was played at the Stade de Sclessin in Liège and won by Anderlecht against Club Brugge on 22 May 1994.

=== Bracket ===
Round of 32
Beveren	1
Beerschot	2
Waregem	3
Overpelt Fabriek	0
Harelbeke	3
Aalst	2
Gent	1
Anderlecht	2
Molenbeek	1
Cercle Brugge	0
Mouscron	1
Oostende	2
RRC Heirnis Gent	4
Kortrijk	3
Lommelse	5
Lierse	3
Antwerp	4
Tilleur-Saint-Nicolas	0
Genk	2
Lokeren	3
Club Brugge	4
KV Mechelen	2
Standard Liège	3
RFC Liège	2
R.U. Saint-Gilloise	0
Germinal Ekeren	6
Sérésien	3
Deinze	0
ROC Charleroi	2
R Charleroi SC	4
Geel	2(4)
Sint-Truidense	2(3)

Round of 16
Beerschot	2*
Waregem	1
Harelbeke	0
Anderlecht	3
Molenbeek	1(4)
Oostende	1(2)
RRC Heirnis Gent	1
Lommelse	2
Antwerp	3
Lokeren	0
Club Brugge	3*
Standard Liège	2
Germinal Ekeren	4
Sérésien	1
R Charleroi SC	5
Geel	1

Quarter-finals
Beerschot	1
Anderlecht	3*
Molenbeek	2
Lommelse	0
Antwerp	0
Club Brugge	3
Germinal Ekeren	2
R Charleroi SC	0

Semifinals
Anderlecht	0	2
Molenbeek	0	2
Club Brugge	4	3
Germinal Ekeren	0	1

Final
Anderlecht	2
Club Brugge	0

* after extra time

=== Final ===
22 May 1994
16:00 CET

Anderlecht	2–0	Club Brugge
Versavel 36'; Nilis 74'

Stade Maurice Dufrasne, Liège
Attendance: 17,660
Referee: Léon Schelings
